= Eastern Counties 1 =

English level 9 Rugby Union League

- Current season or competition: 2019–20 Eastern Counties 1
- Sport: Rugby union
- Instituted: 1987; 39 years ago
- Number of teams: 24 (8 per divisional league)
- Country: England
- Holders: Beccles (2nd title) (2018–19) (promoted to London 3 Eastern Counties)
- Most titles: Thetford (3 titles)
- Website: englandrugby.com

Eastern Counties 1 was an English level 9 Rugby Union League. From the 2017-18 promoted teams move up to the newly created London 3 Eastern Counties with the league champions going up automatically, while relegated teams drop down to Eastern Counties 2 (split into three regional divisions - north, south, west). Teams in this league tend to be based in Cambridgeshire, Norfolk or Suffolk. In the past teams from Essex used to take part until the 2003–04 season when they formed a new league - with Essex 1 being the top division.

The division was split across three geographic areas (North, South & West) for the 2017-18 as part of an RFU reorganization of the London & South East regional league. The top two teams from each Area Division shall enter the Championship Phase (Shield) to determine the final rankings for promotion to London 3 Eastern Counties. Other teams will play in the Plate, Bowl and Salver competitions, depending on league position, with clubs finishing bottom of the Salver being relegated to Eastern Counties 2.

== Participating Clubs 2021-22 ==
=== North ===
- Beccles
- Diss II
- Lowestoft & Yarmouth
- North Walsham II
- Norwich II
- Southwold II
- Watton
- Wymondham II

=== South ===
- Braintree II
- Brightlingsea
- Colchester III
- Hadleigh
- Mistley
- Ipswich II
- Stowmarket II
- Sudbury II

=== West ===
- Bury St Edmunds III
- Cambridge III
- Cantabrigian II
- Cottenham Renegades
- Haverhill and District
- Mildenhall & Red Lodge
- Shelford III

== Season 2020–21 ==
On 30 October the RFU announced that a decision had been taken to cancel Adult Competitive Leagues (National League 1 and below) for the 2020/21 season meaning Eastern Counties 1 was not contested.

== Participating Clubs 2019-20 ==
=== North ===
- Diss II
- Holt
- North Walsham II
- Norwich II
- Norwich Medics
- Norwich Union
- Watton
- Wymondham II

=== South ===
- Braintree II
- Colchester III
- Hadleigh
- Halstead Templars
- Mersea Island
- Ipswich II
- Stowmarket II
- Sudbury II

=== West ===
- Bury St Edmunds III
- Cambridge III
- Cantabrigian II
- Cottenham Renegades
- Newmarket
- Saffron Walden II
- Shelford III

== Participating Clubs 2018-19 ==
=== North ===
- Beccles
- Diss II
- Lowestoft & Yarmouth
- North Walsham II
- Norwich II
- Norwich Medics
- Norwich Union
- Wymondham II

=== South ===
- Brightlingsea
- Bury St Edmunds III
- Colchester III
- Hadleigh
- Halstead Templars
- Harwich & Dovercourt II
- Ipswich II
- Sudbury II

=== West ===
- Cambridge III
- Cantabrigian II
- Cottenham Renegades
- Ely II
- March Bears
- Newmarket
- Saffron Walden II
- Shelford III

== Participating Clubs 2017-18 ==
- Beccles (North)
- Brightlingsea (South)
- Bury St. Edmunds III (West)
- Cambridge Adventurers (West)
- Cantabrigian II (West)
- Colchester III (South)
- Cottenham Renegades (West)
- Diss II (North)
- Fakenham (North)
- Great Yarmouth-Broadland (North)
- Hadleigh (South)
- Haverhill & District (West)
- Ipswich Magpies (South)
- Ipswich Y.M. (South)
- Mistley (South)
- North Walsham II (North)
- Norwich Medics (North)
- Norwich Union (North)
- Saffron Walden II (West)
- Shelford III (West)
- Stowmarket II (South)
- Sudbury Talbots (South)
- Swaffham (North)
- Thurston (West)

== Participating Clubs 2016-17 ==
- Beccles (relegated from London 3 North East)
- Bury St Edmunds 3rd XV
- Colchester III
- Crusaders
- Ipswich Y.M.
- Newmarket
- Thetford
- Thurston
- Wisbech
- Woodbridge
- Wymondham

== Participating Clubs 2015-16 ==
- Crusaders
- Ely
- Ipswich Y.M.
- Mersea Island
- Newmarket
- Swaffham
- Thetford
- Thurston
- Wisbech
- Woodbridge
- Wymondham

== Participating Clubs 2014-15 ==
- Crusaders
- Ely
- Ipswich Y.M.
- Mersea Island
- Newmarket
- Southwold
- Swaffham
- Thetford (promoted from Eastern Counties 2)
- Thurston (promoted from Eastern Counties 2)
- Wisbech (relegated from London 3 North East)
- Woodbridge
- Wymondham (relegated from London 3 North East)

== Participating Clubs 2013-14 ==
- Broadland - Great Yarmouth (promoted from Eastern Counties 2)
- Crusaders
- Ely
- Harwich & Dovercourt
- Ipswich Y.M.
- Mersea Island
- Newmarket
- Swaffham (promoted from Eastern Counties 2)
- West Norfolk
- Woodbridge

== Participating Clubs 2012-13 ==
- Crusaders
- Ely
- Hadleigh
- Harwich & Dovercourt
- Ipswich Y.M.
- Mersea Island
- Newmarket
- Southwold
- Thurston
- West Norfolk
- Woodbridge
- Wymondham

== Original teams ==
When league rugby began in 1987 this division contained the following teams:

- Cambridge
- Crusaders
- Ely
- Harlow
- Lowestoft & Yarmouth
- Met Police Chigwell
- Redbridge
- Rochford Hundred
- Romford & Gidea Park
- Shelford
- Thetford

== Eastern Counties 1 honours ==
=== Eastern Counties 1 (1987–1993) ===
The original Eastern Counties 1 was a tier 8 league with promotion up to London 3 North East and relegation down to Eastern Counties 2.

Eastern Counties 1
Season	No of Teams	Champions	Runners–up	Relegated Teams
1987–88	11	Met Police Chigwell	Cambridge	Thetford
1988–89	11	Harlow	Romford & Gidea Park	Lowestoft & Yarmouth
1989–90	11	Canvey Island	Old Edwardians	Ipswich YMCA
1990–91	11	Chelmsford	Basildon	Redbridge
1991–92	11	Rochford Hundred	Campion (Note: 3rd place Braintree also promoted.)	No relegation (Note: As the league was due to increase from 11 to 13 teams for the following season, there was no relegation.)
1992–93	13	Bury St Edmunds	Shelford	Met Police Chigwell, Crusaders
Green backgrounds are promotion places.

=== Eastern Counties 1 (1993–1996) ===
The creation of National 5 South meant that Eastern Counties 1 dropped from a tier 8 league to a tier 9 league for the years that National 5 South was active. Promotion and relegation continued to London 3 North East and Eastern Counties 2 respectively.

Eastern Counties 1
Season	No of Teams	Champions	Runners–up	Relegated Teams
1993–94	13	Maldon	West Norfolk	Wanstead, Cantabrigian
1994–95	13	Lowestoft & Yarmouth	Canvey Island	Westcliff, Ravens
1995–96	13	Diss	Woodbridge	Loughton, Bancroft
Green backgrounds are promotion places.

=== Eastern Counties 1 (1996–2000) ===
The cancellation of National 5 South at the end of the 1995–96 season meant that Eastern Counties 1 reverted to being a tier 8 league. Promotion and relegation continued to London 3 North East and Eastern Counties 2 respectively.

Eastern Counties 1
Season	No of Teams	Champions	Runners–up	Relegated Teams
1996–97	13	Basildon	Campion (Note: Due to restructuring of the London & South East leagues for the following season, seven clubs were promoted including Upminster, Holt, Wymondham, Newmarket and Shelford.)	No relegation (Note: Due to restructuring of the London & South East leagues for the following season, there was no relegation.)
1997–98	10	Hadleigh	Bancroft	Harwich & Dovercourt
1998–99	10	Thetford	Ely	Wanstead, Ilford Wanderers, Met Police Chigwell
1999–00	9	Saffron Walden	Woodbridge	Old Cooperians, Westcliff
Green backgrounds are promotion places.

=== Eastern Counties 1 (2000–2009) ===
The introduction of London 4 North East ahead of the 2000–01 season meant Eastern Counties 1 dropped to become a tier 9 league with promotion to this new division. Relegation continued to Eastern Counties 2 - split into north and south regional divisions between 2000 and 2003.

Eastern Counties 1
Season	No of Teams	Champions	Runners–up	Relegated Teams
2000–01	10	Eton Manor	Upminster	Bancroft, Wanstead, Cantabrigian
2001–02	10	Mersea Island	Beccles	Old Edwardians, Newmarket
2002–03	10	Colchester	Ely	No relegation (Note: The creation of Essex 1 ahead of the 2003–04 season would see six Essex teams, including Canvey Island, Stanford Le Hope, Epping Upper Clapton, Billericay, Wanstead and Maldon, transfer from Eastern Counties 1 into Essex 1 for the following season, meaning that there was no relegation.)
2003–04	9	Thetford	Stowmarket	No relegation (Note: No relegation as league increased from 9 to 10 teams for the following season.)
2004–05	10	Wisbech	Crusaders	Woodbridge, Southwold, Ely
2005–06	10	Beccles	Mersea Island	Thetford, Ipswich Y.M., Cantabrigian
2006–07	10	Mersea Island	Thurston	Dereham, Newmarket
2007–08	11	Wymondham	West Norfolk	Ely
2008–09	10	Lowestoft & Yarmouth	Wisbech	No relegation (Note: No relegation as league increased from 10 to 11 teams for the following season.)
2009–10	11	Newmarket	Stowmarket	Thetford, Fakenham
Green backgrounds are promotion places.

=== Eastern Counties 1 (2009–2017) ===
Eastern Counties 1 remained a tier 9 league despite national restructuring by the RFU. Promotion was to London 3 North East (formerly London 4 North East) and relegation to Eastern Counties 2, which split into three regional divisions - north, south, west - from the 2014–15 season onward.

Eastern Counties 1
Season	No of Teams	Champions	Runners–up	Relegated Teams
2010–11	10	Stowmarket	Holt	Thurston
2011–12	11	Cantabrigian	Wisbech	Broadland - Great Yarmouth
2012–13	12	Wymondham	Ipswich Y.M.	Thurston, Hadleigh, Southwold
2013–14	12	West Norfolk	Newmarket	Broadland - Great Yarmouth, Harwich & Dovercourt
2014–15	12	Southwold	Ely	Woodbridge
2015–16	11	Ely	Wymondham	No relegation (Note: No relegation as league increased from 11 to 12 teams for the following season.)
2016–17	12	Thetford	Wymondham (Note: Due to London 3 North East being split into London 3 Eastern Counties and London 3 Essex, six teams would be promoted this season instead of the usual 1 or 2, including Thetford, Wymondham, Crusaders, Newmarket, Woodbridge and Wisbech.)	Swaffham
Green backgrounds are promotion places.

=== Eastern Counties 1 (2017–present) ===
The cancellation of London 3 North East and subsequent introduction of London 3 Eastern Counties ahead of the 2017–18 meant that Eastern Counties 1 remained a tier 9 league with promotion to this new division. Relegation continued to the regionalised Eastern Counties 2 (north, south, west).

Eastern Counties 1
Season	No of Teams	Champions	Runners–up	Relegated Teams
2017–18	24 (Note: Divided into 3 regional divisions (north/south/west) with 8 teams in each.)	Fakenham	Ipswich Y.M. (Note: 3rd placed Thurston also promoted.)	Broadland-Great Yarmouth, Stowmarket II, Haverhill & District (Note: Broadland - Great Yarmouth were relegated from the north division, Stowmarket II from the south division, and Haverhill & District from the west division.)
2018–19	24	Beccles (Note: Beccles were winners of the Eastern Counties 1 Shield - the final promotion stage of the Eastern Counties 1 competition.)	Hadleigh	Ely II, Harwich & Dovercourt II (Note: Ely II and Harwich & Dovercourt Rugby Club II were the two lowest ranked sides in the Eastern Counties 1 Salver - the final relegation stage of the Eastern Counties 1 competition.)
2019–20	24			
2020–21	24			
Green backgrounds are promotion places.

== Promotion play-offs ==
Between 2004 and 2017 there was a play-off between the runners-up of Eastern Counties 1 and Essex 1 for the third and final promotion place to London 3 North East. The team with the superior league record had home advantage in the tie. At the end of the 2016–17 season the Essex 1 teams had been the most successful with seven wins to the Eastern Counties 1 teams five; and the home team has won promotion on eight occasions compared to the away teams four. Since the introduction of London 3 Eastern Counties and London 3 Essex at the end of the 2016–17 season the playoff has been cancelled.

Eastern Counties 1 v Essex Canterbury Jack promotion play-off results
Season	Home team	Score	Away team	Venue	Attendance
2004-05	Crusaders (EC)	41-24	Upminster (EX)	Beckhithe, Little Melton, Norfolk	
2005–06	Canvey Island (EX)	31-18	Mersea Island (EC)	Tewkes Creek, Canvey Island, Essex	
2006–07	Thurston (EC)	22-33	South Woodham Ferrers (EX)	Robinson Field, Thurston, Suffolk	
2007–08	Maldon (EX)	15-20	West Norfolk (EC)	Drapers Farm Playing Fields, Heybridge, Essex	
2008–09	Wisbech (EC)	38-14	Campion (EX)	Chapel Road, Wisbech, Cambridgeshire	
2009–10	Bancroft (EX)	37-29	Stowmarket (EC)	Buckhurst Way, Buckhurst Hill, Essex	
2010–11	Holt (EC)	HWO (Note: Holt were promoted as Millwall did not manage to raise a team for the 2010-11 play-off game.)	Millwall (EX)	Bridge Road, Holt, Norfolk	
2011–12	Wisbech (EC)	38-12	Maldon (EX)	Chapel Road, Wisbech, Cambridgeshire	
2012–13	Ipswich Y.M. (EC)	20-27	Old Cooperians (EX)	The Street, Rushmere St Andrew, Ipswich, Suffolk	
2013–14	Newmarket (EC)	17-18	Clacton (EX)	The NSDA Pavilion, Newmarket, Suffolk	
2014–15	Epping Upper Clapton (EX)	36-22	Ely (EC)	Upland Road, Thornwood, Essex	400
2015–16	Ilford Wanderers (EX)	66-17	Wymondham (EC)	Ilford Wanderers Sports Ground, Barkingside, Greater London	
2016–17	No promotion playoff this season due to restructuring of Eastern Counties and Essex leagues.				
Green background is the promoted team. EC = Eastern Counties 1 and EX = Essex Canterbury Jack (formerly Essex 1)

== Number of league titles ==
- Thetford (3)
- Beccles (2)
- Lowestoft & Yarmouth (2)
- Mersea Island (2)
- Wymondham (2)
- Basildon (1)
- Bury St Edmunds (1)
- Cantabrigian (1)
- Canvey Island (1)
- Chelmsford (1)
- Colchester (1)
- Diss (1)
- Ely (1)
- Eton Manor (1)
- Fakenham (1)
- Hadleigh (1)
- Harlow (1)
- Maldon (1)
- Met Police Chigwell (1)
- Newmarket (1)
- Rochford Hundred (1)
- Saffron Walden (1)
- Southwold (1)
- Stowmarket (1)
- West Norfolk (1)
- Wisbech (1)

== See also ==
- London & SE Division RFU
- Eastern Counties RU
- Essex RFU
- English rugby union system
- Rugby union in England
