= Eastern Counties 3 =

Rugby Union league

- Current season or competition: 2019–20 Eastern Counties 3
- Sport: Rugby union
- Instituted: 1987; 39 years ago
- Number of teams: 20
- Holders: Southwold II (North – 1st title); Aldeburgh & Thorpeness (South – 1st title) (2018–19) (promoted to Eastern Counties 2)
- Most titles: Multiple teams (1 title)
- Website: ecrurugby.com

Eastern Counties 3 is an English level 11 Rugby Union league, currently divided into 3 regional leagues (north, south, west). Promoted teams moved up to the relevant regional divisions in Eastern Counties 2 while since the abolition of Eastern Counties 4 at the end of the 2016–17 season there has been no relegation. For most of its history, Eastern Counties 3 was divided into two regional divisions – north and south – with teams from Cambridgeshire, Norfolk, Suffolk and Essex taking part. A breakaway of Essex teams at the end of the 2002–03 to form a new league would lead to Eastern Counties 3 being abolished by the end of 2003–04 only to return due to a league restructure to cater for more 2nd and 3rd teams.

== Original teams ==
When league rugby began in 1987 this division contained the following teams:

- Beccles
- Harwich & Dovercourt
- Holt
- Lakenham Hewett
- Maldon
- Newmarket
- Old Edwardians
- South Woodham Ferrers
- Southwold
- Wisbech
- Wymondham

== Eastern Counties 3 honours ==
=== Eastern Counties 3 (1987–1993) ===
The original Eastern Counties 3 was a tier 10 league with promotion up to Eastern Counties 2 and relegation down to Eastern Counties 4.

Eastern Counties 3
Season	No of Teams	Champions	Runners–up	Relegated Teams
1987–88	11	Old Edwardians	South Woodham Ferrers	Southwold
1988–89	11	Campion	Maldon	Wisbech
1989–90	11	Bancroft	Holt	Thetford
1990–91	11	Newmarket	Wanstead	Ilford Wanderers
1991–92	11	Wymondham	Thames Sports (Note: League restructuring in the Eastern Counties meant that eight teams would be promoted including Old Bealonians, Thetford, Lakenham Hewett, Ipswich YMCA, Old Palmerians and Harwich & Dovercourt.)	No relegation (Note: No relegation as league was to increase from 11 to 13 teams for the following season.)
1992–93	13	Loughton	Clacton	Dereham, Wisbech
Green backgrounds are promotion places.

=== Eastern Counties 3 (1993–96) ===
The creation of National 5 South meant that Eastern Counties 3 dropped from a tier 10 league to a tier 11 league for the years that National 5 South was active. Promotion and relegation continued to Eastern Counties 2 and Eastern Counties 4 respectively.

Eastern Counties 3
Season	No of Teams	Champions	Runners–up	Relegated Teams
1993–94	13	Old Cooperians	Ilford Wanderers	London Hospital, Old Brentwoods
1994–95	13	Fakenham	Southwold	Redbridge, Beccles
1995–96	13	Hadleigh	Felixstowe	Clacton, Haverhill & District
Green backgrounds are promotion places.

=== Eastern Counties 3 (1996–1997) ===
The cancellation of National 5 South at the end of the 1995–96 season meant that Eastern Counties 3 reverted to being a tier 10 league. Promotion continued to Eastern Counties 2, while relegation was to Eastern Counties 4.

Eastern Counties 3
Season	No of Teams	Champions	Runners–up	Relegated Teams
1996–97	12	South Woodham Ferrers	Mersea Island	Wisbech
Green backgrounds are promotion places.

=== Eastern Counties 3: North / South (1997–2000) ===
Ahead of the 1997–98 season Eastern Counties 3 was split into two regional divisions - north and south - with both divisions remaining as tier 10 leagues. Promotion and relegation continued to Eastern Counties 2, while relegation was to Eastern Counties 4 - now split into two regional divisions (north and south).

Eastern Counties 3: North / South
Season	No of Teams	Champions	Runners–up	Relegated Teams	League Name
1997–98	9	Beccles	Crusaders	Brightlingsea	East Counties 3 North
1997–98	8	Billericay	East London	Haverhill & District	East Counties 3 South
1998–99	9	Wisbech	Crusaders	March Bears, Stowmarket	East Counties 3 North
1998–99	8	East London	Stanford Le Hope	Witham	East Counties 3 South
1999–00	9	Ipswich Y.M.	Lakenham Hewett	No relegation (Note: No relegation as Eastern Counties 4 was abolished for the next season.)	East Counties 3 North
1999–00	9	Stanford Le Hope	Old Brentwoods	No relegation (Note: No relegation as East Counties tier 4 was abolished for the next season.)	East Counties 3 South
Green backgrounds are promotion places.

=== Eastern Counties 3: North / South (2000–2004) ===
the introduction of London 4 North East ahead of the 2000–01 season meant that Eastern Counties North and South dropped to once again become tier 11 leagues. The regionalisation of Eastern Counties 2 meant that promotion was now to either Eastern Counties 2 North or Eastern Counties 2 South, while the cancellation of Eastern Counties 4 at the end of the 1999–00 season meant there was no longer relegation. The creation of Essex 1, Essex 2 and Essex 3 ahead of the 2003–04 season, meant that Essex based sides left the Eastern Counties leagues. This in turn would lead to the cancellation of Eastern Counties 3 North and South at the end of the 2003–04 season, with all teams transferred to relevant divisions in Eastern Counties 2.

Eastern Counties 3: North / South
Season	No of Teams	Champions	Runners–up	Relegated Teams	League Name
2000–01	9	Stowmarket	Haverhill & District	No relegation	East Counties 3 North
2000–01	11	May & Baker	Millwall	No relegation	East Counties 3 South
2001–02	9	Southwold	Norwich Union	No relegation	East Counties 3 North
2001–02	10	Burnham-On-Crouch	Dagenham	No relegation	East Counties 3 South
2002–03	8	Broadland – Great Yarmouth	Harwich & Dovercourt	No relegation	East Counties 3 North (Note: This was the last season for East Counties 3 North due to the restructuring of the Eastern Counties league. A new Essex league would be introduced leading to teams from East Counties 3 South breaking away to join it. Teams from the East Counties 3 North division would move into either Eastern Counties 2 or Eastern Counties 3 for the next year depending on league position, asides from Witham who joined Essex 3.)
2002–03	9	Ravens (Note: Transferred to Essex 1.)	Runwell Wyverns	No relegation	East Counties 3 South (Note: This was the last season for East Counties 3 South as a new Essex league was introduced. The teams in this division would split away and move into either Essex 2 or Essex 3 depending on league position.)
2003–04	6	Swaffham	Clacton	No relegation	East Counties 3 (Note: East Counties 3 was only operational as a single division for one season. When the season finished most teams were promoted to Eastern Counties 2 asides from Clacton who transferred to Essex 3.)
Green backgrounds are promotion places.

=== Eastern Counties 3: North / South / West (2014—present) ===
After an absence of nine years, Eastern Counties 3 was re-introduced as a tier 11 league ahead of the 2014–15 season, this time split into three regional divisions - north, south and west. Promotion was to the respective regional division in Eastern Counties 2, and relegation was to Eastern Counties 4 - north or south - until that league was cancelled at the end of the 2016–17 season

Eastern Counties 3: North / South / West
Season	No of Teams	Champions	Runners–up	Relegated Teams	League Name
2014–15	10	Beccles II	Wymondham II	Wisbech II	Eastern Counties 3 North
2014–15	9	Colchester III	Sudbury II	Woodbridge II	Eastern Counties 3 South
2014–15	8	Ely II	Cantabrigian III	No relegation	Eastern Counties 3 West
2015–16	11	North Walsham II	Norwich Union	Lakenham Hewett	Eastern Counties 3 North
2015–16	9	Brightlingsea	Colchester IV	Mersea Island II	Eastern Counties 3 South
2015–16	10	Sawston	Shelford IV	No relegation	Eastern Counties 3 West
2016–17	11	Diss III (Note: Despite being champions Diss III were not promoted as Diss II were in division above.)	Holt II	Crusaders II	Eastern Counties 3 North
2016–17	9	Thurston II	Harwich II	University of Essex	Eastern Counties 3 South
2016–17	11	March Bears	St Ives II	No relegation	Eastern Counties 3 West
2017–18	12	Dereham	Norwich III	No relegation	Eastern Counties 3 North
2017–18	9	Woodbridge II	Mersea Island II	No relegation	Eastern Counties 3 South
2017–18	4	Shelford V (Note: Champions Shelford V not promoted as Shelford IV in division above.)	Cantabrigian III	No relegation	Eastern Counties 3 South
2018–19	12	Southwold II	Crusaders II	No relegation	Eastern Counties 3 North
2018–19	8	Aldeburgh & Thorpeness	Maldon II	No relegation	Eastern Counties 3 South
2019–20	12			No relegation	Eastern Counties 3 South
2019–20	8			No relegation	Eastern Counties 3 South
2020–21	12			No relegation	Eastern Counties 3 South
2020–21	8			No relegation	Eastern Counties 3 South
Green backgrounds are promotion places.

== Number of league titles ==
- Aldeburgh & Thorpeness (1)
- Bancroft (1)
- Beccles (1) (Note: As a club Beccles has won 2 titles - 1 by the 1st XV, 1 by the 2nd XV.)
- Beccles II (1)
- Billericay (1)
- Brightlingsea (1)
- Broadland – Great Yarmouth (1)
- Burnham-On-Crouch (1)
- Campion (1)
- Colchester III (1)
- Dereham (1)
- Diss III (1)
- East London (1)
- Ely II
- Fakenham (1)
- Hadleigh (1)
- Ipswich Y.M. (1)
- Loughton (1)
- March Bears (1)
- May & Baker (1)
- Newmarket (1)
- North Walsham (1)
- Old Cooperians (1)
- Old Edwardians (1)
- Ravens (1)
- Sawston (1)
- Shelford V (1)
- South Woodham Ferrers (1)
- Southwold (1) (Note: As a club Southwold has won 2 titles - 1 by the 1st XV, 1 by the 2nd XV.)
- Southwold II (1)
- Stanford Le Hope (1)
- Stowmarket (1)
- Swaffham (1)
- Thurston II (1)
- Wisbech (1)
- Woodbridge II (1)
- Wymondham (1)

== See also ==
- London & SE Division RFU
- Eastern Counties RU
- Essex RFU
- English rugby union system
- Rugby union in England
