= Counties 2 Eastern Counties =

English rugby union league

- Current season or competition: 2024-25 Counties 2 Eastern Counties
- Sport: Rugby union
- Instituted: 2017; 9 years ago
- Number of teams: 11
- Country: England
- Most titles: Stowmarket, West Norfolk, Wymondham (1 title)
- Website: englandrugby.com

Counties 2 Eastern Counties (formerly London 3 Eastern Counties) is an English rugby union league that is at the eighth level of the English rugby union system and is available to club sides based in Cambridgeshire, Norfolk, Suffolk (Eastern Counties) along with clubs in Essex which are members of Eastern Counties Rugby Union.

The division was created for the 2017–18 as part of an RFU reorganization of the London & South East regional league. Originally there had been a London 3 North East league which had involved teams from the Eastern Counties as well as Essex and parts of north-east London. Due to the distances involved for teams travelling potentially from London to Norfolk and vice versa, at the end of the 2016–17 season, this league was discontinued. Teams in Cambridgeshire, Norfolk and Suffolk who had played in London 3 North East were transferred into the new look London 3 Eastern Counties along with additional promoted teams from Eastern Counties 1, while the Essex and London sides went into another new division called London 3 Essex. Following the RFU's Adult Competition Review, from season 2022-23 it adopted its current name Counties 2 Eastern Counties.

Promoted teams move up to Counties 1 Eastern Counties, while demoted teams drop down to their local merit leagues.

== Participating teams 2026-27 ==
Departing were Cantabrigian and Woodbridge both promoted to Counties 1 Eastern Counties while Thurston (10th) and Thorney (11th) were relegated back to merit league competition. Mersea Island (9th) left on a level transfer to Counties 2 Essex.

Team	Ground	Capacity	City/Area	Previous season
Diss	Mackenders		Roydon, South Norfolk	4th
Ely	Cambridge Commodities Park		Ely, Cambridgeshire	Relegated from Counties 1EC
Fakenham	Eckersley Drive		Fakenham, Norfolk	6th
Hadleigh	Layham Road Sports Ground		Hadleigh, Suffolk	New entry
Ipswich Y.M.	The Street		Ipswich, Suffolk	Relegated from Counties 1EC
Lowestoft & Yarmouth	Gunton Park		Lowestoft , Norfolk	New entry
March Bears	Elm Road		March, Cambridgeshire	Re-entry
Mistley	Furze Hill Playing Fields		Mistley, Essex	3rd
North Walsham II	Norwich Road	1,600	Scottow, Norfolk	Relegated from Counties 1EC
Sudbury II	Whittome Field		Great Cornard, Sudbury, Suffolk	5th
Wisbech	Chapel Road		Wisbech, Cambridgeshire	7th
Wymondham II	The Foster Harrison Memorial Ground		Wymondham, Norfolk	8th

Locations of the 2026-27 Counties 2 Eastern Counties teams

== Participating teams 2025–26 ==
Departing were West Norfolk and Ipswich Y.M., both promoted to Counties 1 Eastern Counties while Bedford Athletic II (7th) were relegated to Counties 3 Midlands East (South South). March Bears (11th) did not return for the new season.

Joining the league were Lakenham Union, a club formed in 2023 by the merger of Lakenham Hewett and Norwich Union. In December the club withdrew from the league leaving eleven sides to contest the remaining fixtures

Team	Ground	Capacity	City/Area	Previous season
Cantabrigian	Sedley Taylor Road		Cambridge, Cambridgeshire	Relegated from Counties 1EC (12th)
Diss	Mackenders		Roydon, South Norfolk	Relegated from Counties 1EC (11th)
Fakenham	Eckersley Drive		Fakenham, Norfolk	5th
~~Lakenham Union~~	Norwich Sports Ground		Norwich, Norfolk	New entry
Mersea Island	Glebe Pavilion		West Mersea, Essex	8th
Mistley	Furze Hill Playing Fields		Mistley, Essex	3rd
Sudbury II	Whittome Field		Great Cornard, Sudbury, Suffolk	New entry
Thorney	Ron Jacobs Playing Fields		Thorney, Cambridgeshire	New entry
Thurston	Robinson Field		Thurston, Suffolk	10th
Wisbech	Chapel Road		Wisbech, Cambridgeshire	6th
Woodbridge	Hatchley Barn		Woodbridge, Suffolk	4th
Wymondham II	The Foster Harrison Memorial Ground		Wymondham, Norfolk	9th

Locations of the 2025-26 Counties 2 Eastern Counties teams

== Participating teams 2024–25 ==
Departing were Colchester II and Newmarket, both promoted to Counties 1 Eastern Counties. Sudbury II (9th), Shelford III (10th) Cotttenham Renegades (11th) were relegated.

Joining were Wisbech, West Norfolk and Ipswich Y.M., all relegated from Counties 1 Eastern Counties, together with Wyndonham II, Mistley and March Bears.

Crusaders (8th in 2023–24) withdrew from the league.

Team	Ground	Capacity	City/Area	Previous season
Bedford Athletic II	Putnoe Woods	500	Bedford, Bedfordshire	3rd
Fakenham	Eckersley Drive		Fakenham, Norfolk	6th
Ipswich Y.M.	The Street		Ipswich, Suffolk	Relegated from Counties 1 EC (10th)
March Bears	Elm Road		March, Cambridgeshire	
Mersea Island	Glebe Pavilion		West Mersea, Essex	5th
Mistley	Furze Hill Playing Fields		Mistley, Essex	
Thurston	Robinson Field		Thurston, Suffolk	7th
West Norfolk	Gatehouse Lane		North Wootton, King's Lynn, Norfolk	Relegated from Counties 1EC (11th)
Wisbech	Chapel Road		Wisbech, Cambridgeshire	Relegated from Counties 1 EC (12th)
Woodbridge	Hatchley Barn		Woodbridge, Suffolk	4th
Wymondham II	The Foster Harrison Memorial Ground		Wymondham, Norfolk	

Locations of the 2024–25 Counties 2 Eastern Counties teams

== Participating teams 2023–24 ==
Departing were Wisbech and North Walsham II, both promoted to Counties 1 Eastern Counties. Norwich Union (9th), Cambridge III (10th) Ipswich II (11th) were relegated.

Joining were Thurston (relegated from Counties 1 Eastern Counties) together with Bedford Athletic II, Crusaders, Shelford III and Mersea Island.

Team	Ground	Capacity	City/Area	Previous season
Bedford Athletic II	Putnoe Woods	500	Bedford, Bedfordshire	
Colchester II	Raven Park		Colchester, Essex	5th
Cotttenham Renegades	High Street		Cottenham, Cambridgeshire	8th
Crusaders	Little Melton Road		Hethersett, Norfolk	
Fakenham	Eckersley Drive		Fakenham, Norfolk	3rd
Mersea Island	Glebe Pavilion		West Mersea, Essex	
Newmarket	NSDA Pavilion		Newmarket, Suffolk	4th
Shelford III	The Davey Field	2,000 (150 seats)	Great Shelford, Cambridgeshire	
Sudbury II	Whittome Field		Great Cornard, Sudbury, Suffolk	7th
Thurston	Robinson Field		Thurston, Suffolk	Relegated from Counties 1 EC
Woodbridge	Hatchley Barn		Woodbridge, Suffolk	6th

Locations of the 2023–24 Counties 2 Eastern Counties teams

== Participating teams 2022–23 ==
This was the first season following the RFU Adult Competition Review with the league adopting its new name of Counties 2 Eastern Counties.

Departing were Holt, Ely, Ipswich Y.M. and Thurston, all promoted to Counties 1 Eastern Counties. Thetford, 9th the previous season, did not return.

Joining were lower teams from Cambridge III, Sudbury II, Colchester II, North Walsham II and Ipswich II together with Cottenham Renegades.

Team	Ground	Capacity	City/Area	Previous season
Cambridge III	Grantchester Road		Cambridge, Cambridgeshire	New entry
Colchester II	Raven Park		Colchester, Essex	New entry
Cotttenham Renegades	High Street		Cottenham, Cambridgeshire	New entry
Fakenham	Eckersley Drive		Fakenham, Norfolk	7th
Ipswich II	Humber Doucy Lane		Ipswich, Suffolk	New entry
Newmarket	NSDA Pavilion		Newmarket, Suffolk	6th
North Walsham II	Norwich Road	1,600	Scottow, Norfolk	New entry
Norwich Union	Barkers Lane		Norwich, Norfolk	8th
Sudbury II	Whittome Field		Great Cornard, Sudbury, Suffolk	New entry
Wisbech	Chapel Road		Wisbech, Cambridgeshire	5th
Woodbridge	Hatchley Barn		Woodbridge, Suffolk	10th

Locations of the 2022–23 Counties 2 Eastern Counties teams

== Participating teams 2021–22 ==
The teams competing in 2021-22 achieved their places in the league based on performances in 2019-20, the 'previous season' column in the table below refers to that season not 2020-21.

Ahead of the new season Crusaders, who finished 6th in 2019-20 withdrew from the league (and will instead participate in Eastern Counties Greene King Division Two North) meaning London 3 EC will run with 10 teams for this season.

Team	Ground	Capacity	City/Area	Previous season
Ely	Cambridge Commodities Park		Ely, Cambridgeshire	3rd
Fakenham	Eckersley Drive		Fakenham, Norfolk	7th
Holt	Bridge Road		Holt, Norfolk	Relegated from London 2NE (11th)
Ipswich Y.M.	The Street		Ipswich, Suffolk	5th
Newmarket	NSDA Pavilion		Newmarket, Suffolk	Promoted via EC Shield (3rd) from Eastern Counties 1 (West) (2nd)
Norwich Union	Barkers Lane		Norwich, Norfolk	Promoted via EC Shield (1st) from Eastern Counties 1 (North) (1st)
Thetford	Mundford Road		Thetford, Norfolk	10th
Thurston	Robinson Field		Thurston, Suffolk	8th
Wisbech	Chapel Road		Wisbech, Cambridgeshire	9th
Woodbridge	Hatchley Barn		Woodbridge, Suffolk	4th

Locations of the 2021–22 London 3 Eastern Counties teams

== Season 2020–21 ==
On 30 October the RFU announced that a decision had been taken to cancel Adult Competitive Leagues (National League 1 and below) for the 2020/21 season meaning London 3 Eastern Counties was not contested.

== Participating teams 2019–20 ==
Team	Ground	Capacity	City/Area	Previous season
Beccles	Beef Meadow		Beccles, Suffolk	Promoted from Eastern Counties 1 (champions)
Cantabrigian	Sedley Taylor Road		Cambridge, Cambridgeshire	Relegated from London 2 North East (10th)
Crusaders	Beck Hythe		Little Melton, Norwich, Norfolk	8th
Ely	Downham Road		Ely, Cambridgeshire	3rd
Fakenham	Eckersley Drive		Fakenham, Norfolk	5th
Ipswich Y.M.	The Street		Ipswich, Suffolk	11th (not relegated)
Thetford	Mundford Road		Thetford, Norfolk	6th
Thurston	Robinson Field		Thurston, Suffolk	10th
West Norfolk	Gatehouse Lane		North Wootton, King's Lynn, Norfolk	4th
Wisbech	Chapel Road		Wisbech, Cambridgeshire	7th
Woodbridge	Hatchley Barn		Woodbridge, Suffolk	9th

Locations of the 2019–20 London 3 Eastern Counties teams

== Participating teams 2018–19 ==
Team	Ground	Capacity	City/Area	Previous season
Crusaders	Beck Hythe		Little Melton, Norwich, Norfolk	9th
Ely	Downham Road		Ely, Cambridgeshire	3rd
Fakenham	Eckersley Drive		Fakenham, Norfolk	Promoted from Eastern Counties 1 (champions)
Holt	Bridge Road		Holt, Norfolk	5th
Ipswich Y.M.	The Street		Ipswich, Suffolk	Promoted from Eastern Counties 1 (runners up)
Thetford	Mundford Road		Thetford, Norfolk	4th
Thurston	Robinson Field		Thurston, Suffolk	Promoted from Eastern Counties 1 (3rd)
West Norfolk	Gatehouse Lane		North Wootton, King's Lynn, Norfolk	8th
Wisbech	Chapel Road		Wisbech, Cambridgeshire	10th
Woodbridge	Heatherlands		Woodbridge, Suffolk	7th
Wymondham	The Foster Harrison Memorial Ground		Wymondham, Norfolk	6th

Locations of the 2018–19 London 3 Eastern Counties teams

== Participating teams 2017–18 ==
Team	Ground	Capacity	City/Area	Previous season
Crusaders	Beck Hythe		Little Melton, Norwich, Norfolk	Promoted from Eastern Counties 1 (3rd)
Ely	Downham Road		Ely, Cambridgeshire	5th (London 3 North East)
Holt	Bridge Road		Holt, Norfolk	Relegated from London 2 North East (11th)
Newmarket	NSDA Pavilion		Newmarket, Suffolk	Promoted from Eastern Counties 1 (4th)
Southwold	The Common		Southwold, Suffolk	4th (London 3 North East)
Stowmarket	Chilton Fields		Stowmarket, Suffolk	6th (London 3 North East)
Thetford	Mundford Road		Thetford, Norfolk	Promoted from Eastern Counties 1 (champions)
West Norfolk	Gatehouse Lane		North Wootton, King's Lynn, Norfolk	9th (London 3 North East)
Wisbech	Chapel Road		Wisbech, Cambridgeshire	Promoted from Eastern Counties 1 (6th)
Woodbridge	Heatherlands		Woodbridge, Suffolk	Promoted from Eastern Counties 1 (5th)
Wymondham	The Foster Harrison Memorial Ground		Wymondham, Norfolk	Promoted from Eastern Counties 1 (runners up)

Locations of the 2017–18 London 3 Eastern Counties teams

== London 3 Eastern Counties honours ==
London 3 Eastern Counties is a tier 8 league with promotion up to London 2 North East and relegation down to Eastern Counties 1.

London 3 Eastern Counties
Season	No of teams	Champions	Runners–up	Relegated Teams
2017–18	11	Stowmarket	Southwold	Newmarket
2018–19	11	Wymondham	Holt	No relegation
2019–20	11	West Norfolk	Cantabrigian	Beccles
2020–21	11			
Green backgrounds are promotion places.

== Promotion play-offs ==
Since the 2017–18 season there has been a play-off between the runners-up of London 3 Eastern Counties and London 3 Essex for the third and final promotion place to London 2 North East. The team with the superior league record has home advantage in the tie. At the end of the 2019–20 season the London 3 Eastern Counties have been the most successful with two wins to the London 3 Essex teams none; and the home team has won promotion on two occasions compared to the away teams none.

London 3 (Eastern Counties v Essex) promotion play-off results
Season	Home team	Score	Away team	Venue	Attendance
2017–18	Southwold (EC)	49-3	Millwall (EX)	The Common, Southwold, Suffolk	300
2018–-19	Holt (EC)	31-22	East London (EX)	Bridge Road, Holt, Norfolk	
2019–20	Cancelled due to COVID-19 pandemic in the United Kingdom. Best ranked runner up - Cantabrigian (EC) - promoted instead.				
2020–21					
Green background is the promoted team. EC = London 3 Eastern Counties and EX = London 3 Essex

== Number of league titles ==
- Stowmarket (1)
- West Norfolk (1)
- Wymondham (1)

== See also ==
- London & SE Division RFU
- Eastern Counties RFU
- English rugby union system
- Rugby union in England
