= Eastern Counties 4 =

English rugby union league

- Current season or competition: 2016–17 Eastern Counties 4
- Sport: Rugby union
- Instituted: 1987; 39 years ago
- Ceased: 2017; 9 years ago
- Number of teams: 18 (across 2 regional divisions)
- Country: England
- Holders: Thetford II (North - 1st title); Hadleigh II (South - 1st title) (2016–17) (promoted to East Counties 3)
- Most titles: Haverhill & District (2 titles)
- Website: ecrurugby.com

Eastern Counties 4 was an English level 12 Rugby Union league that was divided into two regional divisions - north and south - with teams from Cambridgeshire, Norfolk, Suffolk and Essex taking part. Promoted teams used to move up to the relevant division in Eastern Counties 3 and relegation was to Eastern Counties 5 until that division was cancelled at the end of the 1996–97 season. The league was originally abolished in 1999–00 due to East Counties restructuring and teams moved up to higher divisions, only to be reinstated in 2014-15 due to further league restructuring that allowed more 2nd and 3rd teams to take part. It was abolished again at the end of the 2016–17 season.

== Original teams ==
When league rugby began in 1987 this division contained the following teams:

- Campion
- Clacton
- Fakenham
- Felixstowe
- Gothic
- Mayfield Old Boys
- NELPOB
- Old Bealonians
- Old Palmerians
- Rayleigh
- Stowmarket

== East Counties 4 honours ==
=== Eastern Counties 4 (1987–1993) ===
The original Eastern Counties 4 was a tier 11 league with promotion up to Eastern Counties 3 and relegation down to Eastern Counties 5.

Eastern Counties 4
Season	No of Teams	Champions	Runners–up	Relegated Teams
1987–88	11	Campion	Old Bealonians	Rayleigh
1988–89	11	Bancroft	Old Brentwoods	Chigwell
1989–90	11	London Hospital	Old Palmerians	Wisbech
1990–91	11	Thames Sports	Thetford	Felixstowe
1991–92	11	Haverhill & District	Loughton (Note: Due to Eastern Counties league restructuring ten teams were promoted from the division including Stowmarket, Old Cooperians, Ilford Wanderers, Fakenham. Southwold, Dereham, Clacton and Wisbech.)	No relegation (Note: No relegation as league was to increase from 11 to 13 teams for the following season.)
1992–93	13	Felixstowe	Thurston	Stanford Le Hope, Norwich Union
Green backgrounds are promotion places.

=== Eastern Counties 4 (1993–1996) ===
The creation of National 5 South meant that Eastern Counties 4 dropped from a tier 11 league to a tier 12 league for the years that National 5 South was active. Promotion and relegation continued to Eastern Counties 3 and Eastern Counties 5 respectively.

Eastern Counties 4
Season	No of Teams	Champions	Runners–up	Relegated Teams
1993–94	13	Hadleigh	Broadland	Swaffham, Essex Police
1994–95	13	Billericay	Burnham-on-Crouch	Mayfield Old Boys
1995–96	13	Beccles	Mersea Island	May & Baker, Rayleigh
Green backgrounds are promotion places.

=== Eastern Counties 4 (1996–1997) ===
The cancellation of National 5 South at the end of the 1995–96 season meant that Eastern Counties 4 reverted to being a tier 11 league. Promotion continued to Eastern Counties 3, while the cancellation of Eastern Counties 5 at the end of the 1996–97 meant there would be no relegation.

Eastern Counties 4
Season	No of Teams	Champions	Runners–up	Relegated Teams
1996–97	12	March	Burnham-on-Crouch	No relegation (Note: No relegation due to the cancellation of Eastern Counties 5 at the end of the season.)
Green backgrounds are promotion places.

=== Eastern Counties 4 (1997–2000) ===
Ahead of the 1997–98 season Eastern Counties 4 was split into two regional divisions - north and south - with both divisions remaining as tier 11 leagues. Promotion continued to Eastern Counties 3 - now also regionalised into north and south divisions - while the cancellation of Eastern Counties 5 at the end of the 1996–97 season meant there was no relegation. At the end of the 1999–00 season Eastern Counties 4 was cancelled and the majority of teams transferred into Eastern Counties 3.

Eastern Counties 4: North / South
Season	No of Teams	Champions	Runners–up	Relegated Teams	League Name
1997–98	9	Wisbech	Swaffham	No relegation	East Counties 4 North
1997–98	8	Old Brentwoods	Witham	No relegation	East Counties 4 South
1998–99	5	Brightlingsea	Norwich Union	No relegation	East Counties 4 North
1998–99	7	Millwall	May & Baker	No relegation	East Counties 4 South
1999-00	6	Haverhill & District	Clacton	No relegation	East Counties 4 North (Note: This would be the last season for East Counties 4 North and South. The majority of teams from this division would move up into East Counties 3 North for the following season.)
1999-00	6	Witham (Note: Promoted to East Counties 3 North.)	Old Bealonians Vets	No relegation	East Counties 4 South (Note: This would be the last season for East Counties 4 North and South. The majority of teams from this division (asides from champions Witham) would move up into East Counties 3 South for the following season.)
Green backgrounds are promotion places.

=== Eastern Counties 4 (2014–2017) ===
After an absence of thirteen years, Eastern Counties 4 was re-introduced as a tier 12 league ahead of the 2014–15 season, split into two regional divisions - north and south. Promotion was to one of the regional divisions in Eastern Counties 3 - north, south or west - and there was no relegation. Eastern Counties 4 was cancelled for the second time at the end of the 2016–17 season.

Eastern Counties 4
Season	No of Teams	Champions	Runners–up	Relegated Teams	League Name
2014–15	11	Swaffham II	Thetford 2	No relegation	Eastern Counties 4 North
2014–15	8	Colchester IV	University of Essex	No relegation	Eastern Counties 4 South
2015–16	8	Fakenham II	Broadland - Great Yarmouth II	No relegation	Eastern Counties 4 North
2015–16	8	Southwold II	Bury St Edmunds IV	No relegation	Eastern Counties 4 South
2016–17	9	Thetford II	Norwich III	No relegation	Eastern Counties 4 North
2016–17	9	Hadleigh II	Maldon III	No relegation	Eastern Counties 4 South
Green backgrounds are promotion places.

== Number of league titles ==
- Haverhill & District (2)
- Bancroft (1)
- Beccles (1)
- Billericay (1)
- Brightlingsea (1)
- Campion (1)
- Colchester IV (1)
- Fakenham II (1)
- Felixstowe (1)
- Hadleigh (1) (Note: As a club Hadleigh has won 2 titles - 1 by the 1st XV, 1 by the 2nd XV.)
- Hadleigh II (1)
- London Hospital (1)
- March (1)
- Millwall (1)
- Old Brentwoods (1)
- Southwold II (1)
- Swaffham II (1)
- Thames Sports (1)
- Thetford II (1)
- Wisbech (1)
- Witham (1)

== See also ==
- London & SE Division RFU
- Eastern Counties RU
- Essex RFU
- English rugby union system
- Rugby union in England
