= Eastern Counties 6 =

English rugby union league

- Sport: Rugby union
- Instituted: 1988; 38 years ago
- Ceased: 1992; 34 years ago
- Number of teams: 10
- Country: England
- Holders: Witham (1st title) (1991–92) (promoted to Eastern Counties 4)
- Website: ecrurugby.com

Eastern Counties 6 was an English level 13 Rugby Union league with teams from Cambridgeshire, Essex, Norfolk and Suffolk taking part. Promoted teams used to move up to Eastern Counties 5 and, as this was the lowest tier league in the Eastern Counties divisions, there was no relegation. After just four seasons Eastern Counties 6 was cancelled at the end of the 1991–92 campaign.

== Original teams ==
When the division was created in 1988 it contained the following teams:

- Billericay
- Brightlingsea
- Hadleigh
- Old Cooperians
- Ongar
- Orwell
- Thames Sports (Note: Currently known as Thames RFC.)
- Witham

== Eastern Counties 6 honours ==
Eastern Counties 6
Season	No of Teams	Champions	Runners–up	Relegated Teams
1988–89	8	Thames Sports	Ongar (Note: 3rd place Billericay also promoted.)	No relegation
1989–90	10	Old Cooperians	Essex Police	No relegation
1990–91	10	Hadleigh	Brightlingsea (Note: 3rd place Stanford Le Hope also promoted.)	No relegation
1991–92	10	Witham (Note: Due to the cancellation of Eastern Counties 6 at the end of the season, champions Witham were promoted two divisions up to Eastern Counties 4.)	Burnham-on-Crouch (Note: Due to the cancellation of Eastern Counties 6 at the end of the season, runners up Burnham-on-Crouch were also promoted two divisions up to Eastern Counties 4. The other eight teams in the division went into Eastern Counties 5.)	No relegation
Green backgrounds are promotion places.

== Number of league titles ==
- Hadleigh (1)
- Old Cooperians (1)
- Thames Sports (1)
- Witham (1)

== See also ==
- London & SE Division RFU
- Eastern Counties RU
- Essex RFU
- English rugby union system
- Rugby union in England
