= Eastern Counties 2 =

English level 10 Rugby Union League

- Current season or competition: 2019–20 Eastern Counties 2
- Sport: Rugby union
- Instituted: 1987; 39 years ago
- Number of teams: 29 (across 3 regional divisions)
- Country: England
- Holders: Holt II (North - 1st title); Stowmarket (South - 1st title); Shelford IV (West - 1st title) (2018–19) (promoted to Eastern Counties 1)
- Most titles: Cantabrigian, Hadleigh, Ipswich Y.M., Thetford, Wanstead (2 titles)
- Website: ecrurugby.com

Eastern Counties 2 is an English level 10 Rugby Union League - currently divided into 3 regional divisions (north, south, west). Promoted teams move up to Eastern Counties 1 with teams in this league tending to be from Cambridgeshire, Norfolk or Suffolk. Currently a three divisions, Eastern Counties 2 has previously been divided into North and South divisions with teams from Essex taking part, and had relegation to Eastern Counties 3. In 2003-04 the Essex teams broke away, forming a new league - with Essex 2 being the equivalent division to Eastern Counties 2.

In 2014-15 Eastern Counties 2 split into three regional divisions - north, south and west to allow for more 2nd and 3rd teams to take part. Due to the reorganization of the divisions, relegation is now possible to Eastern Counties 3.

== Participating Clubs 2013-14 ==
- Fakenham
- Felixstowe
- Hadleigh (relegated from Eastern Counties 1)
- Haverhill & District
- Mildenhall Red Lodge
- Mistley
- Norwich Medics
- Norwich Union
- Thetford
- Thurston (relegated from Eastern Counties 1)

== Participating Clubs 2012–13 ==
- Broadland – Great Yarmouth
- Felixstowe
- Haverhill & District
- Mildenhall Red Lodge
- Mistley
- Norwich Medics
- Norwich Union
- Sawston
- Swaffham
- Thetford

== Original teams ==
When league rugby began in 1987 this division contained the following teams:

- Basildon
- Braintree
- Canvey Island
- Chelmsford
- Diss
- East London
- Ilford Wanderers
- Port of London Authority (Note: Runners up and promoted side Port of London Authority would be renamed as Ravens for the following season when they competed in Eastern Counties 1.)
- Upminster
- Wanstead
- Woodbridge

== Eastern Counties 2 Honours ==
=== Eastern Counties 2 (1987–1993) ===
The original Eastern Counties 2 was a tier 9 league with promotion up to Eastern Counties 1 and relegation down to Eastern Counties 3.

Eastern Counties 2
Season	No of Teams	Champions	Runners–up	Relegated Teams
1987–88	11	Basildon	Canvey Island	Ilford Wanderers
1988–89	11	Old Edwardians	Braintree	Thetford
1989–90	11	Chelmsford	Woodbridge	Wanstead
1990–91	11	Campion	Port of London Authority (Note: Runners up and promoted side Port of London Authority would be renamed as Ravens for the following season when they competed in Eastern Counties 1.)	Ipswich YMCA
1991–92	11	Maldon	Upminster (Note: 3rd place Lowestoft & Yarmouth also promoted.)	No relegation (Note: There was no relegation as the league was to increase from 11 to 13 teams for the following season.)
1992–93	13	Wymondham	Harwich & Dovercourt	Redbridge, South Woodham Ferrers
Green backgrounds are promotion places.

=== Eastern Counties 2 (1993–96) ===
The creation of National 5 South meant that Eastern Counties 2 dropped from a tier 9 league to a tier 10 league for the years that National 5 South was active. Promotion and relegation continued to Eastern Counties 1 and Eastern Counties 3 respectively.

Eastern Counties 2
Season	No of Teams	Champions	Runners–up	Relegated Teams
1993–94	13	Diss	Holt	Ipswich YMCA, Crusaders
1994–95	12	Ilford Wanderers	Loughton	East London
1995–96	13	Cantabrigian	Wanstead	Old Bealonians, Lakenham Hewett
Green backgrounds are promotion places.

=== Eastern Counties 2 (1996–2000) ===
The cancellation of National 5 South at the end of the 1995–96 season meant that Eastern Counties 2 reverted to being a tier 9 league. Promotion continued to Eastern Counties 1, while relegation was to Eastern Counties 3, which would split into two regional divisions - north and south - ahead of the 1997–98 season.

Eastern Counties 2
Season	No of Teams	Champions	Runners–up	Relegated Teams
1996–97	13	Hadleigh	Bancroft (Note: League restructuring meant that four clubs were promoted including Felixstowe and Westcliff.)	Ravens
1997–98	10	Met Police Chigwell	Thetford	Loughton, Fakenham
1998–99	9	Billericay	Old Cooperians	Southwold, Old Palmerians
1999–00	9	Wanstead	Mersea Island	Harwich & Dovercourt
Green backgrounds are promotion places.

=== Eastern Counties 2: North / South (2000–2003) ===
East Counties 2 was split into two regional divisions - north and south - and the introduction of London 4 North East ahead of the 2000–01 season meant the divisions dropped to become tier 10 leagues. Promotion was to Eastern Counties 1 and relegation to Eastern Counties 3 - north or south.

Eastern Counties 2: North / South
Season	No of Teams	Champions	Runners–up	Relegated Teams	League Name
2000–01	10	Beccles	Ipswich Y.M.	Brightlingsea, Norwich Union, Southwold	East Counties 2 North
2000–01	9	Stanford Le Hope	Epping Upper Clapton	Old Cooperians	East Counties 2 South
2001–02	10	Colchester	Stowmarket	Harwich & Dovercourt	East Counties 2 North
2001–02	10	Wanstead	East London	May & Baker, Millwall	East Counties 2 South
2002–03	10	Ipswich Y.M.	Southwold (Note: 3rd and 4th place Thurston and Cantabrigian were also promoted.)	No relegation	East Counties 2 North (Note: This was the last season for East Counties 2 North due to restructuring of the Eastern Counties league as a new Essex league was introduced. Teams from East Counties 2 North would stay in the league and would move into either Eastern Counties 1 or Eastern Counties 2 for the next season depending on league position.)
2002–03	10	Westcliff (Note: Westcliff transferred to Essex 1 for next season.)	East London (Note: East London transferred to Essex 1 for next season.)	No relegation	East Counties 2 South (Note: This was the last season for East Counties 2 South due to re-structuring of the Eastern Counties league. A new Essex league would be introduced for the next season with teams from East Counties 2 south joining either Essex 1 or Essex 2 for the next year depending on league position.)
Green backgrounds are promotion places.

=== Eastern Counties 2 (2003–2009) ===
Eastern Counties 2 re-merged into a single division ahead of the 2003–04 season, continuing to be a tier 10 league. Promotion continued to Eastern Counties 1 and after the cancellation of Eastern Counties 3 at the end of the 2003–04 season, there was no relegation.

Eastern Counties 2
Season	No of Teams	Champions	Runners–up	Relegated Teams
2003–04	8	Crusaders	Wisbech	No relegation
2004–05	9	Newmarket	Fakenham	No relegation
2005–06	11	Woodbridge	Dereham	No relegation
2006–07	11	Cantabrigian	Ely	No relegation
2007–08	11	Thetford	Newmarket	No relegation
2008–09	10	Southwold	Ely	No relegation
Green backgrounds are promotion places.

=== Eastern Counties 2 (2009–2014) ===
Eastern Counties 2 remained a tier 10 league despite national restructuring by the RFU. Promotion continued to Eastern Counties 1 and there was no relegation.

Eastern Counties 2
Season	No of Teams	Champions	Runners–up	Relegated Teams
2009–10	10	Harwich & Dovercourt	Haverhill & District	No relegation
2010–11	10	Ipswich Y.M.	Broadland - Great Yarmouth	No relegation
2011–12	9	Hadleigh	Thurston	No relegation
2012–13	9	Swaffham	Broadland - Great Yarmouth	No relegation
2013–14	10	Thetford	Thurston	No relegation
Green backgrounds are promotion places.

=== Eastern Counties 2: North / South / West (2014–present) ===
Eastern Counties 2 was once again restructured - this time into three regional divisions - north, south and west. It remained a tier 10 league with promotion to Eastern Counties 1 and the reintroduction of Eastern Counties 3 meant there was once again relegation to one of its regional divisions - north, south or west.

Eastern Counties 2: North / South / West
Season	No of Teams	Champions	Runners–up	Relegated Teams	League Name
2014–15	10	Diss II	Broadland-Great Yarmouth	Watton	Eastern Counties 2 North
2014–15	10	Colchester II	Harwich & Dovercourt	Brightlingsea	Eastern Counties 2 South
2014–15	10	Cantabrigian II	Bury St Edmunds III	Sawston	Eastern Counties 2 North
2015–16	10	Broadland - Great Yarmouth	Norwich Medics	Beccles II	Eastern Counties 2 North
2015–16	10	Colchester III	Harwich & Dovercourt	Aldeburgh & Thorpeness	Eastern Counties 2 South
2015–16	10	Bury St Edmunds III	Cantabrigian II	March Bears	Eastern Counties 2 West
2016–17	10	Fakenham	Diss II	Dereham	Eastern Counties 2 North
2016–17	9	Mersea Island	Ipswich II	Felixstowe	Eastern Counties 2 South
2016–17	9	Cottenham Renegades	Shelford III	Ely II	Eastern Counties 2 West
2017–18	11	Wymondham II	Norwich II	Broadland - Great Yarmouth II	Eastern Counties 2 North
2017–18	9	Halstead Templars	Colchester IV	Ipswich Y.M. II	Eastern Counties 2 South
2017–18	6	March Bears	St Ives II	No relegation	Eastern Counties 2 West
2018–19	10	Holt II	Watton	West Norfolk II	Eastern Counties 2 North
2018–19	9	Stowmarket	Braintree II	Mersea Island II	Eastern Counties 2 South
2018–19	10	Shelford IV (Note: Champions Shelford IV cannot be promoted as Shelford III in Eastern Counties 1.)	Haverhill & District	Sawston	Eastern Counties 2 West
2019–20	10				Eastern Counties 2 North
2019–20	9				Eastern Counties 2 South
2019–20	10				Eastern Counties 2 West
2020–21	10				Eastern Counties 2 North
2020–21	9				Eastern Counties 2 South
2020–21	10				Eastern Counties 2 West
Green backgrounds are promotion places.

== Promotion play-offs ==
From 2000 to 2002 there was a playoff between the runners-up of Eastern Counties 2 North and Eastern Counties 2 South for the third and final promotion place to Eastern Counties 1 with the team with the superior league record has home advantage in the tie. The promotion playoffs were discontinued when a single Eastern Counties 2 division was created for the 2002–03 season.

Eastern Counties 2 North v Eastern Counties 2 North promotion play-off results
Season	Home team	Score	Away team	Venue	Attendance
2000-01	Epping Upper Clapton (S)	21-15	Ipswich Y.M. (N)	Upland Road, Thornwood, Essex	
2001-02	Stowmarket (N)	21-12	East London (S)	Chilton Fields, Stowmarket, Suffolk	
Green background is the promoted team. N = Eastern Counties 2 North and S = Eastern Counties 2 South

== Number of league titles ==
- Cantabrigian (2) (Note: As a club Cantabrigian has won 3 titles - 2 by the 1st XV, 1 by the 2nd XV.)
- Hadleigh (2)
- Ipswich Y.M. (2)
- Thetford (2)
- Wanstead (2)
- Basildon (1)
- Beccles (1)
- Billericay (1)
- Broadland - Great Yarmouth (1)
- Bury St Edmunds III (1)
- Campion (1)
- Cantabrigian II (1)
- Chelmsford (1)
- Colchester (1) (Note: As a club Colchester has won 3 titles - 1 each by the 1st XV, 2nd XV and 3rd XV.)
- Colchester II (1)
- Colchester III (1)
- Cottenham Renegades (1)
- Crusaders (1)
- Diss (1) (Note: As a club Diss has won 2 titles - 1 by the 1st XV, the other by the 2nd XV.)
- Diss II (1)
- Fakenham (1)
- Halstead Templars (1)
- Harwich & Dovercourt (1)
- Holt II (1)
- Ilford Wanderers (1)
- Maldon (1)
- March Bears (1)
- Mersea Island (1)
- Met Police Chigwell (1)
- Newmarket (1)
- Old Edwardians (1)
- Shelford IV (1)
- Southwold (1)
- Stanford Le Hope (1)
- Stowmarket (1)
- Swaffham (1)
- Westcliff (1)
- Woodbridge (1)
- Wymondham (1) (Note: As a club Wymondham has won 2 titles - 1 by the 1st XV, the other by the 2nd XV.)
- Wymondham II (1)

== See also ==
- London & SE Division RFU
- Eastern Counties RU
- Essex RFU
- English rugby union system
- Rugby union in England
