= Essex 3 =

Disused English Rugby Union league

- Sport: Rugby Union
- Instituted: 2003; 23 years ago
- Ceased: 2009; 17 years ago
- Number of teams: 7
- Country: England
- Holders: Pegasus Palmerians (1st title) (2008–09) (promoted to Essex 2)
- Website: clubs.rfu.com

Essex 3 (also known as Essex Oranjeboom League 3 for sponsorship reasons) was an English Rugby Union league which was at the eleventh tier of the domestic competition. It was formerly the basement division of club rugby in Essex and promoted teams moved up to Essex 2. Originally formed in 2003 by breakaway Essex clubs from East Counties 3 South the division ran for six seasons before being abolished at the end of the 2008–09 campaign.

== Original teams ==
When Essex 3 was introduced in 2003 it contained the following teams:

- Kings Cross Steelers - transferred from Eastern Counties 3 South (8th)
- May & Baker - transferred from Eastern Counties 3 South (4th)
- Millwall - N/A (joined league)
- Pegasus Palmerians - transferred from Eastern Counties 3 South (6th)
- Old Cooperians - transferred from Eastern Counties 3 South (5th)
- Ongar - transferred from Eastern Counties 3 South (7th)
- Witham - transferred from Eastern Counties 3 North (8th)

== Essex 3 honours ==
Essex 3
| Season | No of Teams | Champions | Runners–up | Relegated Teams |
| 2003–04 | 7 | Millwall | May & Baker | No relegation |
| 2004–05 | 7 | Writtle Wanderers | Clacton | No relegation |
| 2005–06 | 8 | Old Cooperians | Pegasus Palmerians | No relegation |
| 2006–07 | 7 | Witham | Kings Cross Steelers | No relegation |
| 2007–08 | 6 | Runwell Wyverns | May & Baker | No relegation |
| 2008–09 | 7 | Pegasus Palmerians | Brightlingsea (Note: As this was the last season of Essex 3 all teams in the league would be promoted to Essex 2 aside from Ravens who would join the Essex Merit League Division 6 and Witham who had to withdraw from the league due to financial difficulties.) | No relegation |
Green backgrounds are promotion places.

== Number of league titles ==
- Millwall (1)
- Old Cooperians (1)
- Pegasus Palmerians (1)
- Runwell Wyverns (1)
- Witham (1)
- Writtle Wanderers (1)

== See also ==
- Essex RFU
- English rugby union system
- Rugby union in England
