= Counties 2 Essex =

Rugby union league in Essex

- Current season or competition: 2024-25Counties 2 Essex
- Sport: Rugby union
- Instituted: 2003; 23 years ago
- Number of teams: 9
- Country: England
- Most titles: Billericay, Campion, Dagenham, East London, Upminster, Wanstead (2 titles)
- Website: englandrugby.com

Counties 2 Essex (formerly known as Essex/Canterbury Jack 1 for sponsorship reasons) is an English rugby union league at the ninth tier of the domestic competition and features teams from Essex and parts of north-east London. Promoted clubs tend to move up to Counties 1 Essex. As of season 2026-27 relegated clubs drop into the newly (re)formed Counties 3 Essex.

The division was created in 2003 by Essex-based teams who left Eastern Counties 1 and Eastern Counties 2. Following the RFU's Adult Competition Review, from season 2022–23 it adopted its current name Counties 2 Essex.

Each year some of the clubs in this division also take part in the RFU Junior Vase - a level 9-12 national competition.

For the 2016–17 season the league was divided into two parallel divisions - Essex 1A and Essex 1B - divided on geographical lines with teams in Essex 1A typically based in the north and east of the county, while teams in Essex 1B are predominantly London based. Each division plays 14 home and away games from September until February. From February the top 4 teams from each division go into the Essex 1 Premiership and play for the title and promotion, while the bottom 4 sides from each group would play for the Essex 1 Shield. For the 2018–19 season Essex 1 would revert to being a single division of 11 teams.

== Participating clubs 2026-27 ==
Departing were Burnham-on-Crouch and Old Brentwoods, both promoted to Counties 1 Essex while Witham (7th), Millwall (8th), Clacton (9th) and Writtle Wanderers (10th) were all demoted to the newly (re)formed Counties 3 Essex. Harwich & Dovercourt (11th) returned to merit league competition.

Team	Ground	Capacity	City/Area	Previous season
Basildon	Gardiners Close		Basildon, Essex	4th
Canvey Island	Tewkes Creek		Canvey Island, Essex	3rd
Chelmsford II	Coronation Park		Chelmsford, Essex	New entry
Dagenham	Central Park		Dagenham, London	6th
Kings Cross Steelers	Memorial Park		Plaistow, London	5th
Mersea Island	The Glebe		West Mersea, Mersey Island, Essex	Level transfer from Counties 2 Eastern Counties (9th)
Upminster	Hall Lane		Upminster, London	Relegated from Counties 1 Essex (10th)
Wanstead II	Centenary Fields		Wanstead, London	New entry
Westcliff II	The Gables	1,000	Eastwood, Essex	New entry
Woodford II	Highams		Woodford, London	New entry

Locations of the 2026-27 Counties 2 Essex teams

== Participating clubs 2025–26 ==
Departing were Stanford-le-Hope and Billericay, both promoted to Counties 1 Essex.

Dagenham re-entered the RFU league pyramid having withdrawn from Regional 2 Anglia before the start of the 2024-25 season citing ""...a combination of unforeseen circumstances within the club and a significant shortage of players...".

Kelvedon & Feering (8th in 2024-25) started the season but withdrew in early 2026 leaving eleven clubs to contest the outstanding fixtures.

Team	Ground	Capacity	City/Area	Previous season
Basildon	Gardiners Close		Basildon, Essex	Relegated from Counties 1 Essex
Burnham-on-Crouch	Dengie Hundred Sports Centre		Burnham-on-Crouch, Essex	Relegated from Counties 1 Essex
Canvey Island	Tewkes Creek		Canvey Island, Essex	3rd
Clacton	Valley Road		Clacton-on-Sea, Essex	11th
Dagenham	Central Park		Dagenham, London	Promoted from Div 2 Essex merit leagues
Harwich & Dovercourt	Wick Lane		Harwich, Essex	7th
Kings Cross Steelers	Memorial Park		Plaistow, London	5th
Millwall	Millwall Park		Isle of Dogs, London	4th
Old Brentwoods	Ashwell Road		Pilgrims Hatch, Brentwood, Essex	6th
Witham	Witham Town Football & Social Club		Witham, Essex	9th
Writtle Wanderers	Paradise Road, Writtle		Writtle, Chelmsford, Essex	10th

Locations of the 2025-26 Counties 2 Essex teams

== Participating clubs 2024–25 ==
The experiment of dividing the league was abandoned and North and South divisions reunited.

Departing were Burnham-on-Crouch and Basildon, both promoted to Counties 1 Essex. Meanwhile Barking (7th (South)) were relegated to the Essex RFU merit leagues.

Joining were Stanford-le-Hope, relegated from Counties 1 Essex.

South Woodham Ferrers (7th (North) in 2023-24) started the season but withdrew from the league in December 2024.

Team	Ground	Capacity	City/Area	Previous season
Billericay	Willowbrook	1,000	Billericay, Essex	3rd (South)
Canvey Island	Tewkes Creek		Canvey Island, Essex	5th (South)
Clacton	Valley Road		Clacton-on-Sea, Essex	3rd (North)
Harwich & Dovercourt	Wick Lane		Harwich, Essex	2nd (North)
Kelvedon & Feering	Rye Mill Lane		Feering, Essex	4th (North)
Kings Cross Steelers	Memorial Park		Plaistow, London	4th (South)
Millwall	Millwall Park		Isle of Dogs, London	6th (South)
Old Brentwoods	Ashwell Road		Pilgrims Hatch, Brentwood, Essex	2nd (South)
Stanford-le-Hope	Stanford Recreation Ground		Stanford-le-Hope, Essex	Relegated from Counties 1 Essex
Witham	Witham Town Football & Social Club		Witham, Essex	6th (North)
Writtle Wanderers	Fox Burrows Lane		Writtle, Chelmsford, Essex	5th (North)

Locations of the 2024-25 Counties 2 Essex teams

== Participating clubs 2023–24 ==
Ahead of the new season the decision was taken to split the league into parallel North and South divisions as had previously happened in 2016–17.

Departing were Maldon (champions) and Stanford-le-Hope (runners-up), promoted to Counties 1 Essex.

Pegasus Palmerians (12th in 2022-23) did not return for the new season.

Joining the North league were South Woodham Ferrers (relegated from Counties 1 Essex), Kelvedon & Feering, Witham and Burnham-on-Crouch.

=== North ===
Team	Ground	Capacity	City/Area	Previous season
Burnham-on-Crouch	Dengie Hundred Sports Centre		Burnham-on-Crouch, Essex	Re-entry
Clacton	Valley Road		Clacton-on-Sea, Essex	4th
Harwich & Dovercourt	Wick Lane		Harwich, Essex	7th
Kelvedon & Feering	Rye Mill Lane		Feering, Essex	New entry
South Woodham Ferrers	Saltcoats Playing Field		South Woodham Ferrers, Essex	Relegated from Counties 1 Essex
Witham	Witham Town Football & Social Club		Witham, Essex	Re-entry
Writtle Wanderers	Fox Burrows Lane		Writtle, Chelmsford, Essex	11th

Locations of the 2023-24 Counties 2 Essex (North) teams

=== South ===
Team	Ground	Capacity	City/Area	Previous season
Barking	Goresbrook	1,000	Becontree, London	13th
Basildon	Gardiners Close		Basildon, Essex	8th
Billericay	Willowbrook	1,000	Billericay, Essex	5th
Canvey Island	Tewkes Creek		Canvey Island, Essex	10th
Kings Cross Steelers	Memorial Park		Plaistow, London	3rd
Millwall	Millwall Park		Isle of Dogs, London	6th
Old Brentwoods	Ashwell Road		Pilgrims Hatch, Brentwood, Essex	9th

Locations of the 2023-24 Counties 2 Essex (South) teams

== Participating clubs 2022–23 ==
This was the first season following the RFU Adult Competition Review with the league adopting its new name of Counties 2 Essex.

Returning were nine teams took part in Essex 1 in 2021–22: Barking, Basildon, Billericay, Clacton, Harwich & Dovercourt, Maldon, Millwall, Old Brentwoods and Writtle Wanderers. Bancroft (8th) did not return.

Joining were Canvey Island (12th) and Kings Cross Steelers (11th) relegated from London 3 Essex together with Pegasus Palmerians and Stanford le Hope who both re-joined the league.

Team	Ground	Capacity	City/Area	Previous season
Barking	Goresbrook	1,000	Becontree, London	10th
Basildon	Gardiners Close		Basildon, Essex	5th
Billericay	Willowbrook	1,000	Billericay, Essex	2nd
Canvey Island	Tewkes Creek		Canvey Island, Essex	Relegated from London 3 Essex (12th)
Clacton	Valley Road		Clacton-on-Sea, Essex	3rd
Harwich & Dovercourt	Wick Lane		Harwich, Essex	6th
Kings Cross Steelers	Memorial Park		Plaistow, London	Relegated from London 3 Essex (11th)
Maldon	Drapers Farm Playing Fields		Heybridge, Essex	1st
Millwall	Millwall Park		Isle of Dogs, London	7th
Old Brentwoods	Ashwell Road		Pilgrims Hatch, Brentwood, Essex	9th
Pegasus Palmerians	St Cleres School		Stanford-le-Hope, Essex	Re-entry
Stanford-le-Hope	Stanford Recreation Ground		Stanford-le-Hope, Essex	Re-entry
Writtle Wanderers	Fox Burrows Lane		Writtle, Chelmsford, Essex	4th

Locations of the 2022-23 Counties 2 Essex teams

== Participating clubs 2021–22 ==
The teams competing in 2021-22 achieved their places in the league based on performances in 2019–20, the 'previous season' column in the table below refers to that season not 2020–21.

Ilford Wanderers, who had been relegated from London 3 Essex in 11th place in season 2019–20, withdrew from the league in Autumn 2021 meaning it was completed with eleven teams.

Team	Ground	Capacity	City/Area	Previous season
Bancroft	Buckhurst Way		Buckhurst Hill, Essex	New Entry
Barking	Goresbrook	1,000	Becontree, London	Relegated from London 3 Essex (12th)
Basildon	Gardiners Close		Basildon, Essex	Relegated from London 3 Essex (10th)
Billericay	Willowbrook	1,000	Billericay, Essex	6th
Clacton	Valley Road		Clacton-on-Sea, Essex	5th
Harwich & Dovercourt	Wick Lane		Harwich, Essex	7th
Maldon	Drapers Farm Playing Fields		Heybridge, Essex	3rd
Millwall	Millwall Park		Isle of Dogs, London	4th
Old Brentwoods	Ashwell Road	500	Pilgrims Hatch, Brentwood, Essex	9th
Writtle Wanderers	Fox Burrows Lane		Writtle, Chelmsford, Essex	8th

Locations of the 2021-22 Essex Canterbury Jack 1 teams

== Season 2020–21 ==
On 30 October the RFU announced that a decision had been taken to cancel Adult Competitive Leagues (National League 1 and below) for the 2020/21 season meaning Essex 1 was not contested.

== Participating clubs 2019–20 ==
Team	Ground	Capacity	City/Area	Previous season
Billericay	Willowbrook	1,000	Billericay, Essex	6th
Canvey Island	Tewkes Creek		Canvey Island, Essex	Relegated from London 3 Essex (10th)
Clacton	Valley Road		Clacton-on-Sea, Essex	4th
Dagenham	Central Park		Dagenham, London	3rd
Harwich & Dovercourt	Wick Lane		Harwich, Essex	5th
Maldon	Drapers Farm Playing Fields		Heybridge, Essex	Relegated from London 3 Essex (11th)
Millwall	Millwall Park		Isle of Dogs, London	Relegated from London 3 Essex (12th)
Old Brentwoods	Ashwell Road	500	Pilgrims Hatch, Brentwood, Essex	8th
Writtle Wanderers	Fox Burrows Lane		Writtle, Chelmsford, Essex	7th

Locations of the 2019-20 Essex Canterbury Jack 1 teams

== Participating clubs 2018–19 ==
Team	Ground	Capacity	City/Area	Previous season
Billericay	Willowbrook	1,000	Billericay, Essex	6th (Prem)
Clacton	Valley Road		Clacton-on-Sea, Essex	Relegated from London 3 Essex (8th)
Dagenham	Central Park		Dagenham, London	3rd (Shield)
Harwich & Dovercourt	Wick Lane		Harwich, Essex	1st (Shield)
Mavericks	Warley Playing Field		Warley, Brentwood, Essex	Relegated from London 3 Essex (10th)
Mersea Island	The Glebe		West Mersea, Mersey Island, Essex	4th (Prem)
Old Brentwoods	Ashwell Road	500	Pilgrims Hatch, Brentwood, Essex	7th (Prem)
Thames	Garron Lane		South Ockendon, Essex	N/A
Upminster	Hall Lane		Upminster, London	Relegated from London 3 Essex (9th)
Writtle Wanderers	Fox Burrows Lane		Writtle, Chelmsford, Essex	5th (Prem)

Locations of the 2018-19 Essex Canterbury Jack 1 teams

== Participating clubs 2017–18 ==
=== Essex Canterbury Jack League 1A ===
Team	Ground	Capacity	City/Area	Previous season
Billericay	Willowbrook	1,000	Billericay, Essex	8th (Prem)
Burnham-on-Crouch	Dengie Hundred Sports Centre		Burnham-on-Crouch, Essex	7th (Shield)
Harwich & Dovercourt	Wick Lane		Harwich, Essex	2nd (Shield)
Mersea Island	The Glebe		West Mersea, Mersey Island, Essex	Transferred from Eastern Counties 2 (South) (champions)
Stanford-le-Hope	Stanford Recreation Ground		Stanford-le-Hope, Essex	6th (Prem)
Witham	Witham Town Football & Social Club		Witham, Essex	8th (Shield)
Writtle Wanderers	Fox Burrows Lane		Writtle, Chelmsford, Essex	1st (Shield)

Locations of the 2017-18 Essex Canterbury Jack 1A teams

=== Essex Canterbury Jack League 1B ===
Team	Ground	Capacity	City/Area	Previous season
Bancroft	Buckhurst Way		Buckhurst Hill, Essex	3rd (Shield)
Dagenham	Central Park		Dagenham, London	5th (Shield)
Ilford Wanderers	Ilford Wanderers Sports Ground		Ilford, London	Transferred from London 3 North East (11th)
Kings Cross Steelers	Memorial Park	500	Plaistow, London	6th (Shield)
May & Baker	M&B Eastbrook Community Club		Dagenham, London	N/A
Old Brentwoods	Ashwell Road	500	Pilgrims Hatch, Brentwood, Essex	7th (Prem)
Pegasus Palmerians	St Cleres School		Stanford-le-Hope, Essex	4th (Shield)

Locations of the 2017-18 Essex Canterbury Jack 1B teams

== Participating clubs 2016–17 ==
=== Essex 1A ===
- Bancroft
- Billericay
- Dagenham
- Kings Cross Steelers
- Millwall
- Old Brentwoods (relegated from London 3 North East)
- Pegasus Palmerians
- Stanford Le Hope

=== Essex 1B ===
- Braintree
- Burnham-on-Crouch
- Canvey Island
- Clacton
- Harwich & Dovercourt
- Maldon
- Writtle Wanderers
- Witham

== Participating clubs 2015–16 ==
- Bancroft
- Billericay (relegated from London 3 North East)
- Braintree
- Canvey Island
- Clacton (relegated from London 3 North East)
- East London
- Ilford Wanderers
- Kings Cross Steelers
- Maldon
- Millwall
- Pegasus Palmerians
- Stanford Le Hope
- Writtle Wanderers

== Participating clubs 2014–15 ==
- Bancroft
- Burnham-on-Crouch
- Canvey Island (relegated from London 3 North East)
- Dagenham
- East London
- Epping Upper Clapton
- Ilford Wanderers
- Maldon
- May & Baker
- Millwall
- Pegasus Palmerians
- Writtle Wanderers

== Original teams ==
When Essex 1 was introduced in 2003 it contained the following teams:

- Billericay - transferred from Eastern Counties 1 (7th)
- Canvey Island - transferred from Eastern Counties 1 (9th)
- East London - transferred from Eastern Counties 2 South (runners up)
- Epping Upper Clapton - transferred from Eastern Counties 1 (8th)
- Ilford Wanderers II - transferred from Eastern Counties 2 South (3rd)
- Maldon - transferred from Eastern Counties 1 (3rd)
- Stanford Le Hope - transferred from Eastern Counties 1 (10th)
- Upminster - relegated from London 4 North East (9th)
- Wanstead - transferred from Eastern Counties 1 (4th)
- Westcliff - transferred from Eastern Counties 2 South (champions)

== Essex 1 honours ==
=== Essex 1 (2004–2009) ===
The original Essex 1 was a tier 9 league with promotion up to London 4 North East and relegation down to Essex 2.

Essex 1
Season	No of Teams	Champions	Runners–up	Relegated Teams
2003–04	10	Westcliff	Wanstead	Canvey Island
2004–05	10	Wanstead	Upminster	Stanford Le Hope
2005–06	10	Upminster	Canvey Island	Thames
2006–07	10	Billericay	South Woodham Ferrers	Ilford Wanderers II (Note: Ilford Wanderers II were relegated despite finishing 7th as Ilford Wanderers 1st team was demoted to the league for the following season.)
2007–08	10	Dagenham	Maldon	East London, Millwall
2008–09	10	Wanstead	Campion	Writtle Wanderers, Epping Upper Clapton
Green backgrounds are promotion places.

=== Essex 1 (2009–2017) ===
Essex 1 remained a tier 9 league despite national restructuring by the RFU. Promotion was to London 3 North East (formerly London 4 North East) and relegation was to Essex 2 until that division was disbanded at the end of the 2013–14 season.

Essex 1
Season	No of Teams	Champions	Runners–up	Relegated Teams
2009–10	10	Campion	Bancroft	Ilford Wanderers
2010–11	11	East London	Millwall	Dagenham, Thames, Brightlingsea
2011–12	10	Old Brentwoods	Maldon	Writtle Wanderers, Pegasus Palmerians
2012–13	10	Campion	Old Cooperians	Burnham-On-Crouch, Millwall
2013–14	9	Billericay	Clacton	No relegation (Note: No relegation as Essex 2 cancelled at the end of the season.)
2014–15	11	May & Baker	Epping Upper Clapton	No relegation
2015–16	13	East London	Ilford Wanderers	No relegation
2016–17	16	Braintree	Canvey Island (Note: Due to London 3 North East being split into London 3 Eastern Counties and London 3 Essex, five teams would be promoted this season instead of the usual 1 or 2, including Maldon, Clacton and Millwall.)	No relegation
Green backgrounds are promotion places.

=== Essex 1 (2017–present) ===
The cancellation of London 3 North East and subsequent introduction of London 3 Essex ahead of the 2017–18 meant that Essex 1 remained a tier 9 league with promotion to this new division, and as it was the lowest division for clubs in Essex, there was no relegation.

Essex 1
Season	No of Teams	Champions	Runners–up	Relegated Teams
2017–18	16	Kings Cross Steelers	Ilford Wanderers	No relegation
2018–19	10	Upminster	Mavericks	No relegation
2019–20	9	Dagenham	Canvey Island	No relegation
2020–21	9			No relegation
2021-22	10	Maldon	Billericay	
Green backgrounds are promotion places.

== Promotion play-offs ==
From 2004 to 2016 there was a play-off between the runners-up of Eastern Counties 1 and Essex 1 for the third and final promotion place to London 3 North East. The team with the superior league record had home advantage in the tie. At the end of the 2015–16 season the Essex 1 teams had been the most successful with seven wins to the Eastern Counties 1 teams five; and the home team had won promotion on eight occasions compared to the away teams four. Since the introduction of London 3 Eastern Counties and London 3 Essex at the start of the 2017–18 season the playoff has been cancelled.

Eastern Counties 1 v Essex 1 promotion play-off results
Season	Home team	Score	Away team	Venue	Attendance
2004-05	Crusaders (EC)	41-24	Upminster (EX)	Beckhithe, Little Melton, Norfolk	
2005–06	Canvey Island (EX)	31-18	Mersea Island (EC)	Tewkes Creek, Canvey Island, Essex	
2006–07	Thurston (EC)	22-33	South Woodham Ferrers (EX)	Robinson Field, Thurston, Suffolk	
2007–08	Maldon (EX)	15-20	West Norfolk (EC)	Drapers Farm Playing Fields, Heybridge, Essex	
2008–09	Wisbech (EC)	38-14	Campion (EX)	Chapel Road, Wisbech, Cambridgeshire	
2009–10	Bancroft (EX)	37-29	Stowmarket (EC)	Buckhurst Way, Buckhurst Hill, Essex	
2010–11	Holt (EC)	HWO (Note: Holt were promoted as Millwall did not manage to raise a team for the 2010-11 play-off game.)	Millwall (EX)	Bridge Road, Holt, Norfolk	
2011–12	Wisbech (EC)	38-12	Maldon (EX)	Chapel Road, Wisbech, Cambridgeshire	
2012–13	Ipswich Y.M. (EC)	20-27	Old Cooperians (EX)	The Street, Rushmere St Andrew, Ipswich, Suffolk	
2013–14	Newmarket (EC)	17-18	Clacton (EX)	The NSDA Pavilion, Newmarket, Suffolk	
2014–15	Epping Upper Clapton (EX)	36-22	Ely (EC)	Upland Road, Thornwood, Essex	400
2015–16	Ilford Wanderers (EX)	66-17	Wymondham (EC)	Ilford Wanderers Sports Ground, Barkingside, Greater London	
Green background is the promoted team. EC = Eastern Counties 1 and EX = Essex Canterbury Jack (formerly Essex 1)

== Number of league titles ==
- Billericay (2)
- Campion (2)
- East London (2)
- Upminster (2)
- Wanstead (2)
- Braintree (1)
- Dagenham (1)
- Kings Cross Steelers (1)
- Maldon (1)
- May & Baker (1)
- Old Brentwoods (1)
- Westcliff (1)

== See also ==
- London & SE Division RFU
- Essex RFU
- English rugby union system
- Rugby union in England
