= Eastern Counties 5 =

English rugby union league

- Sport: Rugby union
- Instituted: 1987; 39 years ago
- Ceased: 1997; 29 years ago
- Number of teams: 9
- Country: England
- Holders: Millwall (1st title) (1996–97) (promoted to East Counties 4 South)
- Website: ecrurugby.com

Eastern Counties 5 was an English level 13 Rugby Union league with teams from Cambridgeshire, Essex, Norfolk and Suffolk taking part. Promoted teams used to move up to Eastern Counties 4 and relegation was to Eastern Counties 6 until that division was cancelled at the end of the 1991–92 season. After ten seasons Eastern Counties 5 was cancelled at the end of the 1996–97 campaign.

== Original teams ==
When league rugby began in 1987 this division contained the following teams:

- Bancroft
- Dereham
- Haverhill & District
- London Hospital (Note: Since 1995 have been known as St Barts and The Royal London RFC.)
- Loughton
- March (Note: Currently known as March Bears RUFC.)
- Norwich Union
- Old Brentwoods
- Orwell
- Sawston
- Swaffham
- Thurston

== Eastern Counties 5 honours ==
=== Eastern Counties 5 (1987–1993) ===
The original Eastern Counties 5 was a tier 12 league with promotion up to Eastern Counties 4 and relegation down to Eastern Counties 6 until that division was cancelled at the end of the 1991–92 season.

Eastern Counties 5
Season	No of Teams	Champions	Runners–up	Relegated Teams
1987–88	12	Bancroft	Old Brentwoods	Orwell
1988–89	9	London Hospital	Loughton	Sawston
1989–90	10	Haverhill & District	Thames Sports	Chigwell
1990–91	9	Dereham	Old Cooperians	No relegation (Note: No relegation as league was to increase from 9 to 11 teams for the following season.)
1991–92	11	Ongar	Hadleigh (Note: Restructuring of the Eastern Counties leagues due to the cancellation of Eastern Counties 6 at the end of the season, meant that all eleven teams were promoted from the division into Eastern Counties 4.)	No relegation (Note: No relegation due to cancellation of Eastern Counties 6 at the end of the season.)
1992–93	11	May & Baker	Broadland	No relegation
Green backgrounds are promotion places.

=== Eastern Counties 5 (1993–1996) ===
The creation of National 5 South meant that Eastern Counties 5 dropped from a tier 12 league to a tier 13 league for the years that National 5 South was active. Promotion continued to Eastern Counties 4 and there was no relegation.

Eastern Counties 5
Season	No of Teams	Champions	Runners–up	Relegated Teams
1993–94	12	Mersea Island	Mayfield Old Boys	No relegation
1994–95	7	Sawston	Rayleigh	No relegation
1995–96	6	Norwich Union	Stanford Le Hope	No relegation
Green backgrounds are promotion places.

=== Eastern Counties 5 (1996–1997) ===
The cancellation of National 5 South at the end of the 1995–96 season meant that Eastern Counties 5 once more became a tier 12 league. Promotion continued to Eastern Counties 4 and there was no relegation. At the end of the 1996–97 Eastern Counties 5 was discontinued and all teams transferred into Eastern Counties 4.

Eastern Counties 5
Season	No of Teams	Champions	Runners–up	Relegated Teams
1996–97	9	Millwall	Swaffham (Note: The cancellation of Eastern Counties 5 at the end of the season meant that all clubs were promoted into Eastern Counties 4.)	No relegation
Green backgrounds are promotion places.

== Number of league titles ==
- Bancroft (1)
- Dereham (1)
- Haverhill & District (1)
- London Hospital (1)
- May & Baker (1)
- Mersea Island (1)
- Millwall (1)
- Norwich Union (1)
- Ongar (1)
- Sawston (1)

== See also ==
- London & SE Division RFU
- Eastern Counties RU
- Essex RFU
- English rugby union system
- Rugby union in England
