= London 3 North East =

English rugby union league

- Current season or competition: 2016–17 London 3 North East
- Sport: Rugby union
- Instituted: 2000; 26 years ago (as London 4 North East)
- Ceased: 2017; 9 years ago
- Number of teams: 12
- Country: England
- Holders: Harlow (1st title) (2016–17) (promoted to London 2 North East)
- Most titles: Braintree, Campion, Saffron Walden (2 titles)
- Website: englandrugby.com

London 3 North East was an English rugby union league that was the eighth level of club rugby union in England and was available to sides from north east London, Essex, Cambridgeshire, Norfolk and Suffolk. Promoted clubs move into London 2 North East. Relegated teams tended to drop to Eastern Counties 1 or Essex 1 depending on geographical location, with new teams also coming from these leagues.

The league was discontinued at the end of the 2016–17 season as the RFU decided to instead create two new leagues - London 3 Eastern Counties and London 3 Essex - to reduce travelling times for teams involved. The teams from London 3 North East were transferred to either London 3 Eastern Counties or London 3 Essex depending on geography, along with additional teams being promoted from regional leagues if needed.

== Participating teams 2016-17 ==
- Basildon
- East London (promoted from Essex 1)
- Ely (promoted from Eastern Counties 1)
- Harlow
- Ilford Wanderers
- Lowestoft & Great Yarmouth
- May & Baker
- Southwold
- Stowmarket
- Upminster RFC
- Wanstead
- West Norfolk

== Participating teams 2015-16 ==
- Beccles
- Epping Upper Clapton (promoted from Essex 1)
- Harlow
- Lowestoft & Great Yarmouth
- May & Baker (promoted from Essex 1)
- Old Brentwoods
- Old Cooperians (relegated from London 2 North East)
- Southwold (promoted from Eastern Counties 1)
- Stowmarket
- Upminster
- Wanstead
- West Norfolk

== Participating teams 2014-15 ==
- Beccles
- Billericay (promoted from Essex 1)
- Cantabrigian
- Clacton (promoted from Essex 1)
- Harlow
- Lowestoft & Great Yarmouth (relegated from London 2 North East)
- Old Brentwoods
- Stowmarket (relegated from London 2 North East)
- Sudbury
- Upminster
- Wanstead
- West Norfolk (promoted from Eastern Counties 1)

== Participating teams 2013-14 ==
- Beccles
- Campion (promoted from Eastern Counties 1)
- Cantabrigian
- Canvey Island
- Harlow
- Old Brentwoods
- Old Cooperians (promoted from Essex 1)
- Sudbury
- Upminster
- Wansted
- Wisbech
- Wymondham (promoted from Eastern Counties 1)

== Participating teams 2012-13 ==
- Beccles
- Cantabrigian
- Canvey Island
- East London
- Harlow
- Norwich
- Old Brentwoods
- South Woodham Ferrers
- Sudbury
- Upminster
- Wanstead
- Wisbech

== Original teams ==
When this division as introduced in 2000 (as London 4 North East) it contained the following teams:

- Bury St Edmunds - relegated from London 3 North East (8th)
- Canvey Island - relegated from London 3 North East (9th)
- Ely - relegated from London 3 North East (12th)
- Hadleigh - relegated from London 3 North East (10th)
- Holt - relegated from London 3 North East (13th)
- Newmarket - relegated from London 3 North East (14th)
- Saffron Walden - promoted from Eastern Counties 1 (champions)
- Thetford - relegated from London 3 North East (7th)
- West Norfolk - relegated from London 3 North East (11th)
- Woodbridge - promoted from Eastern Counties 1 (runners up)

== London 3 North East honours ==
=== London 4 North East (2000–2009) ===
Originally known as London 4 North East, this division was a tier 8 league with promotion up to London 3 North East and relegation down to Eastern Counties 1 and (from 2003 to 2004) Essex 1.

London 4 North East
Season	No of teams	Champions	Runners–up	Relegated Teams
2000–01	10	Bury St Edmunds	Hadleigh	Holt, Newmarket, Ely
2001–02	10	Saffron Walden	West Norfolk	Canvey Island
2002–03	10	Braintree	Eton Manor	Woodbridge, Upminster
2003–04	10	Campion	Chelmsford	Ely
2004–05	10	Rochford Hundred	Westcliff	Thetford, Beccles, Mersea Island
2005–06	10	Braintree	Colchester	West Norfolk, Wanstead, Wymondham
2006–07	10	Saffron Walden	Chelmsford	Stowmarket, Wisbech
2007–08	10	Mersea Island	Sudbury	Campion
2008–09	12	Colchester	Ipswich	Crusaders
Green backgrounds are promotion places.

=== London 3 North East (2009–2017) ===
League restructuring by the RFU ahead of the 2009–10 season saw London 4 North East renamed as London 3 North East. Remaining as a tier 8 league, promotion was to London 2 North East (formerly London 3 North East), while relegation continued to either Eastern Counties 1 or Essex 1. The division was cancelled at the end of the 2016–17 season, with all non-promoted teams moving into the newly introduced London 3 Eastern Counties and London 3 Essex.

London 3 North East
Season	No of teams	Champions	Runners–up	Relegated Teams
2009–10	12	Beccles	Canvey Island	Billericay, Dagenham, West Norfolk
2010–11	12	Basildon	Lowestoft & Yarmouth	Mersea Island, Bancroft, Wisbech
2011–12	12	Holt	Stowmarket	Newmarket, Wymondham, Campion
2012–13	12	South Woodham Ferrers	Norwich	East London, Sudbury
2013–14	12	Campion	Old Cooperians	Canvey Island, Wymondham, Wisbech
2014–15	12	Sudbury	Cantabrigian	Billericay, Clacton
2015–16	11	Old Cooperians	Epping Upper Clapton	Beccles, Old Brentwoods
2016–17	11	Harlow	Wanstead	No relegation (Note: Due to the RFU reorganizing splitting teams from London 3 North East into London 3 Eastern Counties and London 3 Essex for the 2017-18 season, no teams were relegated, although 11th place Ilford Wanderers would decide to join Essex 1.)
Green backgrounds are promotion places.

== Number of league titles ==
- Braintree (2)
- Campion (2)
- Saffron Walden (2)
- Basildon (1)
- Beccles (1)
- Bury St Edmunds (1)
- Colchester (1)
- Harlow (1)
- Mersea Island (1)
- Old Cooperians (1)
- Rochford Hundred (1)
- South Woodham Ferrers (1)
- Sudbury (1)

== See also ==
- Eastern Counties RFU
- English rugby union system
- Rugby union in England
