= Diss RFC =

English rugby union club, based in Norfolk

(England) Diss
- Full name: Diss Rugby Club
- Union: Eastern Counties RFU
- Founded: 1958; 68 years ago
- Location: Roydon, Norfolk, England
- Ground: Mackenders
- Chairman: Andy Jeremy
- President: Harry Bowden
- Coach: Clive Bell
- Captain: Nick Garnham
- League: Counties 1 Eastern Counties
- 2024–25: 11th (relegated to Counties 2 Eastern Counties)

Official website
- www.pitchero.com/clubs/dissrugby/

Diss Rugby Club is an English rugby union team based in Diss in Norfolk. The club runs three senior teams, a veterans side, a ladies team called Diss Vixens and a full range of junior teams. The first XV play in Counties 2 Eastern Counties – a league at tier 8 in the English rugby union system – following their relegation from Counties 1 Eastern Counties at the end of the 2024–25 season.

== History ==
The club was formed in 1958.

== Honours ==
1st team:

- Eastern Counties 2 champions: 1993–94
- Eastern Counties 1 champions: 1995–96
- London 2 North East champions (2): 1996–97, 2016–17
- London 2 (north-east v north-west) promotion play-off winner: 2007–08
- London Division 2 North champions: 2008–09

2nd team:

- Greene King IPA Eastern Counties 2 North champions: 2014–15

3rd team

- Greene King IPA Eastern Counties 3 North champions: 2016–17
