= Bury St Edmunds RUFC =

English rugby union club, based in Bury St Edmunds, Suffolk

(England) Bury St Edmunds RUFC
- Full name: Bury St Edmunds Rugby Union Football Club
- Union: Eastern Counties RFU
- Founded: 1925; 101 years ago
- Location: Bury St Edmunds, Suffolk
- Ground: The Haberden (Capacity: 3,000)
- Chairman: Andrew Speed
- President: Heidi Tilbrook
- Director of Rugby: James Shanahan
- Coach(es): James Shanahan; Ben Penfold
- Captain(s): George Grigg-Pettitt; Ben Cooper
- League: National League 2 East
- 2025–26: 1st (promoted to National League 1)
Team kit

Official website
- www.bserugby.co.uk

Bury St Edmunds RUFC is a rugby union club based in Bury St Edmunds in Suffolk. Founded in 1925 as Bury and West Suffolk Rugby Football Club, the Men's 1st XV currently play in English rugby union system, National League 1. The Women's side who play in the second tier of the RFU system, Championship North 1. There are a total of 4 senior men's teams, and 2 women's teams, as well as youth boys and youth girls.

== History ==
Bury St Edmunds RUFC played their first match as "Bury and West Suffolk Rugby Football Club" in 1925, with post-war practice taking place at Culford School. In 2001, the first team was promoted to London 3 North East, winning the league six years later to be promoted to London 2 North in 2007. Promotion to National League 3 London & SE followed in 2013 after they won London Division 1 North, winning all 26 games during the season.

In 2025, the women's side were crowned Champions of Women's Championship Midlands 2 (2024–25), winning 9 out of the 10 games and were promoted into the 2nd tier of rugby, Championship North 1, for the 2025–26 season. In 2026, the men’s side were crowned Champions of National League 2 East (2025-26), winning 20 out of the 26 games and were promoted to National League 1.

In 1974, 18 members of the team were killed when Turkish Airlines Flight 981 crashed outside Paris. In September 2024, a 50th anniversary memorial cycle ride was held to commemorate the tragedy. The ride was led by stakeholders Jules Arthur, Austin Cornish and Roydon Turner, with around 60 cyclists travelling approximately 354 miles (570 km) from Ermenonville Forest in France to Bury St Edmunds over six days. It raised more than £203,000, with the proceeds shared between the club and St Nicholas Hospice.

== Honours ==
1st team:

- Eastern Counties 1 champions: 1992–93
- London Division 4 North East champions: 2000–01
- London Division 3 North East champions: 2006–07
- London Division 1 North champions: 2012–13
- National League 3 London & SE champions: 2014–15
- National League 2 East champions: 2025–26

2nd team:

- Counties 1 Eastern Counties champions: 2025–26

3rd team:

- Greene King IPA Eastern Counties 2 West champions: 2015–16

== Facilities ==
Bury St Edmunds RUFC is based at The Haberden ground in the eastern side of Bury St Edmunds. The club has one all-weather pitch. Parking at the ground is used by medical staff at the nearby West Suffolk Hospital during the week. The club-house has seating capacity for 135 with standing space surrounding the pitch, bringing total capacity to around 3,000.

== Current standings ==
2026–27 National League 1 table
Pos	Team	Pld	W	D	L	PF	PA	PD	TB	LB	Pts	Qualification
1	Plymouth Albion	8	8	0	0	436	130	+306	8	0	40	Promotion place
2	Tonbridge Juddians	8	7	0	1	327	289	+38	8	0	36	Promotion play-off
3	Camborne	8	7	0	1	312	237	+75	7	0	35	Promotion play-off
4	Leeds Tykes	8	5	0	3	291	220	+71	6	3	29	
5	Sale FC	8	5	0	3	330	224	+106	6	2	28	
6	Rosslyn Park	8	4	0	4	277	266	+11	7	1	24	
7	London Scottish	8	4	0	4	290	299	−9	6	1	23	
8	Birmingham Moseley	8	4	0	4	230	279	−49	6	1	23	
9	Bishop's Stortford	8	3	0	5	287	296	−9	7	2	21	
10	Rams	8	2	1	5	208	269	−61	6	2	18	
11	Bury St Edmunds	8	3	0	5	210	313	−103	5	0	17	Relegation play-off
12	Dings Crusaders	8	1	1	6	288	355	−67	7	3	16	Relegation place
13	Sheffield	8	2	0	6	190	291	−101	5	2	15	Relegation place
14	Cambridge	8	0	0	8	219	427	−208	5	3	8	Relegation place

Updated to match(es) played on 31 October 2026. Source: National League Rugby
Rules for classification: If teams are level at any stage, tiebreakers are applied in the following order:
1. Number of matches won
2. Number of matches drawn
3. Difference between points for and against
4. Total number of points for
5. Aggregate number of points scored in matches between tied teams
6. Number of matches won excluding the first match, then the second and so on until the tie is settled

== See also ==
- Bury Titans
