= London 3 Essex =

English rugby union league

- Sport: Rugby union
- Instituted: 2017; 9 years ago
- Number of teams: 12
- Country: England
- Holders: Chelmsford (1st title) (2019–20) (promoted to London 2 North East)
- Most titles: Basildon, Chelmsford, Epping Upper Clapton (1 title)
- Website: englandrugby.com

London 3 Essex was an English rugby union league at the eighth level of the English rugby union system and was available to club sides based in Essex and north-east London. Promoted teams moved up to London 2 North East with league champions going up automatically and the runners up playing a playoff against the runners up from London 3 Eastern Counties, while demoted teams usually dropped down to Essex Canterbury Jack 1, with new teams also coming up from this league. Each year all clubs in the division also took part in the RFU Senior Vase – a level 8 national competition.

The division was created for the 2017–18 season as part of an RFU reorganization of the London & South East regional league. Originally there had been a London 3 North East league which had involved teams from Essex and north-east London along with teams from the Eastern Counties (Cambridgeshire, Norfolk and Suffolk). Due to the distances involved for teams travelling potentially from London to Norfolk and vice versa, at the end of the 2016–17 season this league was discontinued. Teams in Essex and north-east London who had played in London 3 North East were transferred into the new look London 3 Essex along with additional promoted teams from the Essex regional leagues, while the Eastern Counties sides went into another new division called London 3 Eastern Counties.

Following the Rugby Football Union's Adult Competition Review, the league's place in the English rugby union system was taken by Counties 1 Essex, with the teams placed 1st to 10th in 2021–22 London 3 Essex making up the new league.

== Teams for 2021–22 ==
The teams competing in 2021-22 achieved their places in the league based on performances in 2019–20, the 'previous season' column in the table below refers to that season not 2020–21.

Team	Ground	Capacity	City/Area	Previous season
Braintree	Robbswood		Braintree, Essex	4th
Campion	Cottons Park		Romford, London	8th
Canvey Island	Tewkes Creek		Canvey Island, Essex	Promoted from Essex 1 (runners up)
Dagenham	Central Park		Dagenham, London	Promoted from Essex 1 (champions)
East London	Memorial Park		West Ham, London	5th
Epping Upper Clapton	Upland Road		Thornwood, Epping, Essex	Relegated from London 2 NE (12th)
Harlow	Latton Park		Harlow, Essex	2nd
Kings Cross Steelers	Memorial Park	500	Plaistow, London	7th
Mavericks	Warley Playing Field		Warley, Brentwood, Essex	9th
Old Cooperians	Coopers' Company & Corborn School		Upminster, London	6th
Romford & Gidea Park	Crowlands		Romford, London	Relegated from London 2 NE (10th)
Upminster	Hall Lane		Upminster, London	3rd

Locations of the 2021–22 London 3 Essex teams in Essex
Locations of the 2021–22 London 3 Essex teams in Greater London

== Season 2020–21 ==
On 30 October the RFU announced that a decision had been taken to cancel Adult Competitive Leagues (National League 1 and below) for the 2020–21 season meaning London 3 Essex was not contested.

== Teams for 2019–20 ==
Team	Ground	Capacity	City/Area	Previous season
Barking	Goresbrook	1,000	Becontree, London	9th
Basildon	Gardiners Close		Basildon, Essex	Relegated from London 2 NE (12th)
Braintree	Robbswood		Braintree, Essex	3rd
Campion	Cottons Park		Romford, London	8th
Chelmsford	Coronation Park		Chelmsford, Essex	4th
East London	Memorial Park		West Ham, London	Runners up (lost playoff)
Harlow	Latton Park		Harlow, Essex	Relegated from London 2 NE (11th)
Ilford Wanderers	Ilford Wanderers Sports Ground		Ilford, London	5th
Kings Cross Steelers	Memorial Park	500	Plaistow, London	6th
Mavericks	Warley Playing Field		Warley, Brentwood, Essex	Promoted from Essex 1 (runners up)
Old Cooperians	Coopers' Company & Corborn School		Upminster, London	7th
Upminster	Hall Lane		Upminster, London	Promoted from Essex 1 (champions)

Locations of the 2019–20 London 3 Essex teams

== Teams for 2018–19 ==
Team	Ground	Capacity	City/Area	Previous season
Barking	Goresbrook	1,000	Becontree, London	Relegated from London 2 SE (12th)
Braintree	Robbswood		Braintree, Essex	3rd
Campion	Cottons Park		Romford, London	7th
Canvey Island	Tewkes Creek		Canvey Island, Essex	5th
Chelmsford RFC	Coronation Park		Chelmsford, Essex	Relegated from London 2 NE (10th)
East London	Memorial Park		West Ham, London	4th
Epping Upper Clapton	Upland Road		Thornwood, Epping, Essex	Relegated from London 2 NE (11th)
Ilford Wanderers	Ilford Wanderers Sports Ground		Ilford, London	Promoted from Essex 1 (runners up)
Kings Cross Steelers	Memorial Park	500	Plaistow, London	Promoted from Essex 1 (champions)
Maldon	Drapers Farm Playing Fields		Heybridge, Essex	6th
Millwall	Millwall Park		Isle of Dogs, London	Runners up (lost playoff)
Old Cooperians	Coopers' Company & Corborn School		Upminster, London	Relegated from London 2 NE (12th)

Locations of the 2018–19 London 3 Essex teams

== Teams for 2017–18 ==
Team	Ground	Capacity	City/Area	Previous season
Basildon	Gardiners Close		Basildon, Essex	8th (London 3 North East)
Braintree	Robbswood		Braintree, Essex	Promoted from Essex 1 (champions)
Campion	Cottons Park		Romford, Havering, London	Relegated from London 2 North East (12th)
Canvey Island	Tewkes Creek		Canvey Island, Essex	Promoted from Essex 1 (runners up)
Clacton	Valley Road		Clacton-on-Sea, Essex	Promoted from Essex Jack 1 (4th)
East London	Memorial Park		West Ham, London	3rd (London 3 North East)
Maldon	Drapers Farm Playing Fields		Heybridge, Essex	Promoted from Essex 1 (3rd)
Mavericks	Warley Playing Field		Warley, Brentwood, Essex	Invited from Essex Merit Leagues
Millwall	Millwall Park		Isle of Dogs, London	Promoted from Essex 1 (5th)
Upminster	Hall Lane		Upminster, London	7th (London 3 North East)

Locations of the 2017–18 London 3 Essex teams

== London 3 Essex honours ==
London 3 Essex was a tier 8 league with promotion to London 2 North East and relegation to Essex 1.

London 3 Essex
Season	No of teams	Champions	Runners–up	Relegated Teams
2017–18	10	Basildon	Millwall	Mavericks, Upminster, Clacton
2018–19	12	Epping Upper Clapton	East London	Millwall, Maldon, Canvey Island
2019–20	12	Chelmsford	Harlow	Barking, Ilford, Basildon
2020–21	12			
Green backgrounds are promotion places.

== Promotion play-offs ==
From the 2017–18 season there was a play-off between the runners-up of London 3 Eastern Counties and London 3 Essex for the third and final promotion place to London 3 North East. The team with the superior league record had home advantage in the tie. At the end of the 2019–20 season the London 3 Eastern Counties were the most successful with two wins to the London 3 Essex teams none; and the home team won promotion on two occasions compared to the away teams none.

London 3 (Eastern Counties v Essex) promotion play-off results
Season	Home team	Score	Away team	Venue	Attendance
2017–18	Southwold (EC)	49-3	Millwall (EX)	The Common, Southwold, Suffolk	300
2018–19	Holt (EC)	31-22	East London (EX)	Bridge Road, Holt, Norfolk	
2019–20	Cancelled due to COVID-19 pandemic in the United Kingdom. Best ranked runner up - Cantabrigian (EC) - promoted instead.				
2020–21					
Green background is the promoted team. EC = London 3 Eastern Counties and EX = London 3 Essex

== Number of league titles ==
- Chelmsford (1)
- Basildon (1)
- Epping Upper Clapton (1)

== See also ==
- Essex RFU
- English rugby union system
- Rugby union in England
