= Kings Cross Steelers =

English rugby union club, based in West Ham, London

(England) Kings Cross Steelers RFC
- Full name: Kings Cross Steelers RFC
- Union: Essex RFU
- Nickname: Steelers
- Founded: 1 November 1995; 30 years ago
- Location: West Ham, Newham, London
- Ground: Memorial Park "Steelers Stadium" (Capacity: 500)
- Chairman: Gus Fraser
- President: Richard Freeman
- Coach: Matt Rozier
- Captain: Ryan Wise
- League: Counties 2 Essex
- 2042/25: 5th
1st kit	2nd kit

First match
- Orleans Former Pupils 1–0 Kings Cross Steelers

Official website
- www.kxsrfc.com

The Kings Cross Steelers are a British rugby union team, based in London. Founded in 1995, it was the world's first gay-inclusive rugby union club. Its founding sparked the beginning of a much larger gay-inclusive rugby movement which to date includes over 60 clubs across the world.

== History ==
=== Foundation and name ===
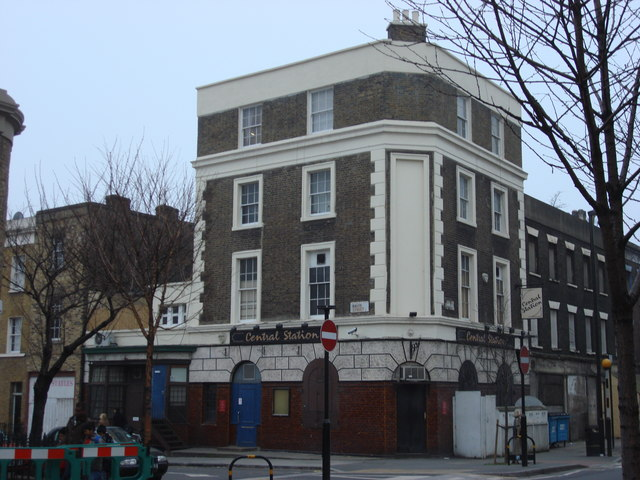
The Central Station pub

The Kings Cross Steelers were founded in London on 1 November 1995, in the Central Station gay pub, which was (and is) located a street or so away from London's King's Cross Station.

The club's name reflects a combination of its geographical roots, and the sporting affiliations of some of its founding members. Geographically, King's Cross was the area of Central London where the club was founded. Note that since it was not named after the eponymous railway station, there is no apostrophe in the club's name.

The "Steelers" is a homage to the Pittsburgh Steelers, an American football team, of which numerous of the founding members of the Kings Cross Steelers were fans. The Pittsburgh Steelers are so named because Pittsburgh, Pennsylvania was, during the decade of that club's founding and renaming, the centre of the American steel industry (and remains the headquarters of U.S. Steel).

Whilst naming sports teams after existing teams is a relatively common phenomenon (for example, the Texan rugby team Dallas Harlequins RFC draws its inspiration from England's more famous Harlequin F.C.), the Kings Cross Steelers are one of the few such sports teams to be named through inspiration from a team which competes in a different sport.

=== Subsequent chronology ===
In the summer of 1996 the club joined the Surrey County Union. They played their first game on 21 September 1996, which they lost by 92–10 to Orleans Former Pupils at Strawberry Hill.

In June 1999 the Steelers become full members of the English Rugby Football Union (RFU) and at the same time joined Surrey County League Four.

In August 1999 the Steelers played a match against the newly formed Manchester gay team, the Village Spartans. This was the world's first match between two gay/bi rugby teams. The Steelers won 22–15.

In July 2000 the Steelers took part in the Rugby Sevens competition at the UK Gay Sports Festival held at Waltham Forest. Visiting US team, the Washington Renegades, and the Manchester Village Spartans also fielded teams.

In 2001 the Steelers grew to be large enough to field a second squad. The 2nd XVs played their first match in February.

In June 2002, the club were runners up in the Mark Kendall Bingham Memorial Tournament. In May 2004 the Steelers hosted the 2004 Bingham Cup in Esher, Surrey.

In February 2007 the club celebrated its first "gay marriage" between two Steelers. The club travelled to Copenhagen for the Union Cup, the biennial tournament for European inclusive rugby clubs in May, winning the cup. In May, the club was promoted to the Essex League 2. In Dublin in 2008 the Steelers were the tournament runners-up, losing to the Sydney Convicts in the final.

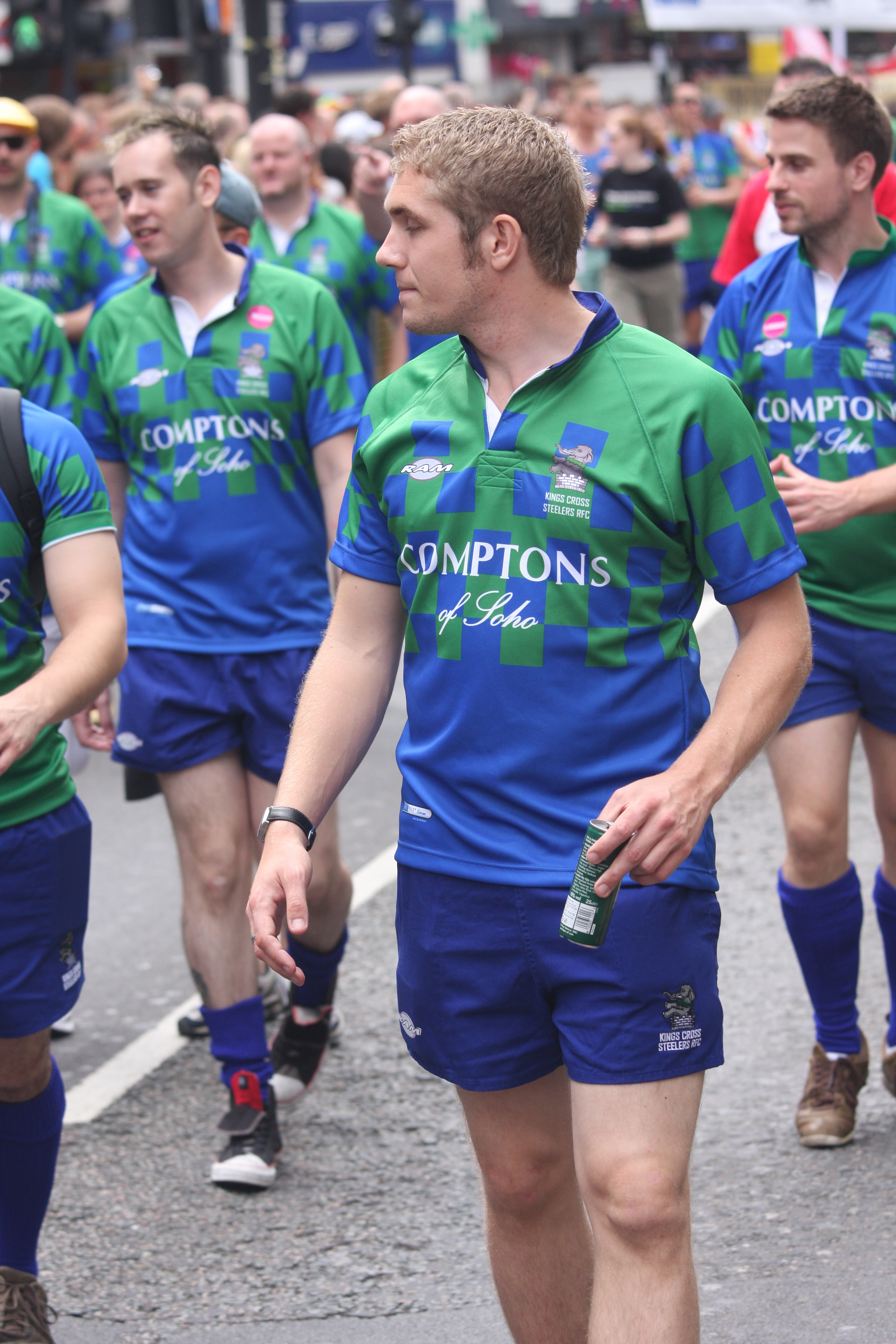
Steelers players at Pride in London 2009

In 2009, the club hosted, and won, the Union Cup. In 2011, the club successfully defended its Union Cup title in Amsterdam after a final against the Manchester Village Spartans. In the same year, the club won the Hadrian Cup, a yearly tournament held in Newcastle and organised by the Newcastle Ravens.

In May 2013, the club again successfully retained the Union Cup in Bristol, after a final against Ireland's Emerald Warriors. The club won without conceding a single try throughout the tournament.

In 2014 the club travelled to Sydney for the Bingham Cup in August. The club narrowly lost out in the semi-final match.

In May 2015, the Steelers successfully defended the Union Cup.

In May 2016, the club took four full teams to the Bingham Cup in Nashville, Tennessee.

April 2017 saw the club take four teams to the Union Cup 2017 in Madrid, Spain, with the 1st XV winning the cup for the sixth successive tournament.

At the end of the 2017–18 season the club finished as champions of Essex Canterbury Jack 1 and were promoted to London 3 Essex.The 1st XV went the entirety of the league without losing a game for the first time in the club's history.

2018 saw the club head to Amsterdam to compete in the Bingham Cup when it was hosted by the ARC Lowlanders. The Steelers were followed by an injured player who is a documentary filmmaker and the club is the subject of an independent documentary film called Steelers.

The Emerald Warriors were the hosts of the 2019 Union Cup in Dublin where once again the 1st XV defended the Union Cup title.

Both the 2020 Bingham Cup (Ottawa, Canada) and the 2021 Union Cup (Birmingham, UK) were postponed to 2022 and 2023 respectively due to COVID-19.

The Kings Cross Steelers 1XV won the 2022 Ottawa Bingham Cup, overcoming the Sydney Convicts in the semi-final (having never defeated them before) and the New York Gotham Knights in the final. In the entirety of the tournament the Kings Cross Steelers allowed only five points against them, marking one of the most dominant Bingham victory runs in history. The 2nd XV won the Hoagland Cup marking a double victory for the club in its most successful outing at the Bingham tournament ever.

The Birmingham Bulls were the hosts of the (delayed) 2021 Union Cup (held over the final weekend in April 2023) in Birmingham where once again the 1st XV defended the Union Cup title. With victory in the final coming against Toulouse Tou'Win by a score of 15 points to 3. These three points were the only conceded by the Steelers 1st XV during this tournament. This tournament also marked the first time the Steelers or any IGR club has taken 6 teams to a Union Cup Tournament.

In August 2026, the club won the Bingham Cup which was hosted by the Brisbane Hustlers in Brisbane Australia, defeating the Sydney Convicts 12-5 in a rugged final.

== Composition ==
As a sports club explicitly founded with the intention of fielding a gay team, the club's players are mostly homosexual, bisexual, and/or transgender. None of the four standing teams currently fielded by the club compete in women's rugby, so there are no lesbians.

From 2014 to 2018, the head coach of the Kings Cross Steelers was Nic Evans, a woman.

== Recent sporting position ==
For the 2018/19 season, the Kings Cross Steelers 1st XV play in London 3 Essex with the 2nd XV playing in Merit Table Division 6 (West) and the 3rd XV playing in Merit Table Division 6 (East). Previously the 1st XV have played in Essex 2 & Essex 3, with the promotion to Essex 2 during the 2006/07 season. The 3rd XV entered league rugby for the first time in 2016/17 playing in the Merit Table Division 7.

The 4th XV, primarily made up of new members joining through the club's Pathway to Rugby programme, have played the Turing Cup against other inclusive rugby teams from around the country as well as friendlies between newly formed teams.

== Logo, kit, and sponsorship ==
The logo is of an elephant in a castle. The logo is based on the crest of Marquess Camden, and forms part of the crest of the London Borough of Camden (which covers the King's Cross area). Or to give it the correct description "On a Wreath of the Colours issuant from a Mural Crown Argent a demi Elephant Sable armed or about the neck a Wreath of Holly fructed proper". The elephant in the club badge is affectionately known as "Nelly".

For kit, the 2017/18 jerseys for the Steelers 1st XV and 2nd XV are green and blue striped with grey panels on the sides. The jerseys for the 3rd XV are blue and grey striped, while the jerseys for the 4th XV are salmon and turquoise striped. Shorts and socks in all cases are blue.

As of June 2022 the Kings Cross Steelers were sponsored by, amongst others:

- UBS investment bank (who sponsor the front of the matchday shirts);
- McGill and Partners, an insurance broker
- 2Brewers, a gay-friendly cabaret bar in Clapham
- Gayle, Australia's first and only independently-owned gay beer and cider company
- Canterbury of New Zealand, the sports brand, as kit supplier have featured the Steelers in ad campaigns and have worked with the club on several events.

== Film ==
The documentary film Steelers: The World's First Gay Rugby Club, directed by Australian TV journalist and amateur rugby player Eammon Ashton-Atkinson, premiered online at the Glasgow Film Festival in 2021. The film went on to screen at a number of major film festivals, including BFI Flare London, the Boston Globe's GlobeDocs, and the New Zealand International Film Festival, and was generally well received by critics, although not all agreed. Benjamin Lee called it a "moving documentary" in The Guardian, but only gave the film 2 out of 5 stars; Louis Wise, also writing in The Guardian, called it "a timely study of LGBTQ+ sport". The film scores 71% on review aggregator site Rotten Tomatoes

Ashton-Atkinson was inspired to make the film after an injury put him out of play for the Bingham Cup, and Australian rugby star Israel Folau said in January 2020 that "hell awaits" gay people. The film features coach Nic Evans; players Steve Brockman and Simon Jones; and coach-player and part-time drag queen Andrew McDowell, aka Drewalicious.

== See also ==
- Essex Rugby Football Union
- International Gay Rugby
- Robert Hayward, Baron Hayward
