= Chelmsford R.F.C. =

English rugby union club, based in Chelmsford, Essex

(England) Chelmsford R.F.C
- Full name: Chelmsford Rugby Football Club
- Union: Essex RFU
- Nickname: Blue Boys
- Founded: 1920; 106 years ago
- Location: Chelmsford, Essex, England
- Ground: Coronation Park
- Coach: Matt Searle
- Captain: Will Cooper
- League: Regional 2 Anglia
- 2025–26: 9th
1st kit	2nd kit	3rd kit

Official website
- www.chelmsfordrugby.com

Chelmsford Rugby Football Club is a rugby union team based in Chelmsford, Essex that currently play in Regional 2 Anglia -- a league at tier 6 in the English rugby union system.

== History ==
Chelmsford RFC were founded in 1920. At present, there are around 620 members and the club fields up to four senior teams each week. Chelmsford currently play in Regional 2 Anglia. In addition to the senior teams, there are 300 Mini/Youth members providing teams from under 6's to under 17's. The team play at Coronation Park in Timpsons Lane, Springfield, Chelmsford where they have played for more than 40 years.

== Honours ==
- Eastern Counties 2 champions: 1989–90
- Eastern Counties 1 champions: 1990–91
- London 2 North East champions (2): 1998–99, 2014–15
- London 3 Essex champions: 2019–20

== See also ==
- Essex RFU
