= Eastern Counties Rugby Union =

(England) Eastern Counties RFU
- Full name: Eastern Counties Rugby Union
- Union: RFU
- Founded: 1877; 149 years ago
- Region: Cambridgeshire, Norfolk, Suffolk
Team kit

Official website
- www.ecrurugby.com

The Eastern Counties Rugby Union (ECRU) is the governing body for the sport of rugby union in the counties of Cambridgeshire, Norfolk and Suffolk in England. Clubs in the old Huntingdonshire and the Soke of Peterborough are affiliated to the East Midlands Rugby Football Union. The union is the constituent body of the Rugby Football Union (RFU) for those counties. The ECRU administers and organises rugby union clubs and competitions in those three counties and administers the Eastern Counties county rugby representative teams.

== History ==
The Eastern Counties Rugby Union was founded in 1890 and originally organised rugby union in Essex, Suffolk and Norfolk. Cambridgeshire became part of the ECRU in 1952 and the Essex Rugby Football Union eventually split off from ECRU to form its own body in 2003.

== Men's senior county team honours ==
County Championship runners-up: 1948, 1975
County Championship Plate runners-up: 2015
County Championship Shield runners-up: 2007

== Games played against international opposition ==
Year	Date	Opponent	Venue	Result	Score	Tour
1990	30 October	Argentina	Cambridge	Loss	15-28	1990 Argentina rugby union tour of British Isles

== Affiliated clubs ==
There are currently 53 clubs affiliated with the Eastern Counties RU, most of which have teams at both senior and junior level. Each club is in turn affiliated with a sub-county rugby football union, either Cambridgeshire, Norfolk or Suffolk, and are mostly based in those three counties except several cases where they are instead based in Essex or Hertfordshire.

- Beccles (Norfolk)
- Brightlingsea (Suffolk)
- Broadland-Great Yarmouth (Norfolk)
- Bury St Edmunds (Suffolk)
- Cambridge (Cambridgeshire)
- Cambourne Exiles (Cambridgeshire)
- Cantabrigan (Cambridgeshire)
- Clacton (Essex/Suffolk) (Note: Clacton are based in Essex but are joint members of both Essex RFU and Suffolk RFU.)
- Colchester (Essex/Suffolk) (Note: Colchester are based in Essex but are members of the Suffolk RFU.)
- Cottenham Renegades (Cambridgeshire)
- Crusaders (Norfolk)
- Dereham (Norfolk)
- Diss (Norfolk)
- Ely (Cambridgeshire)
- Fakenham (Norfolk)
- Felixstowe (Suffolk)
- Hadleigh (Suffolk)
- Harwich & Dovercourt (Suffolk)
- Haverhill & District (Suffolk)
- Holt (Norfolk)
- Ipswich (Suffolk)
- Ipswich YM (Suffolk)
- Lakenham Hewett (Norfolk)
- Lowestoft & Yarmouth (Norfolk)
- March Bears (Cambridgeshire)
- Mersea Island (Essex/Suffolk) (Note: Mersea Island are based in Essex but are members of the Suffolk RFU.)
- Mildenhall Red Lodge (Cambridgeshire)
- Mistley (Suffolk)
- Newmarket (Cambridgeshire)
- North Walsham (Norfolk)
- Norwich (Norfolk)
- Norwich Medics (Norfolk)
- Norwich Union (Norfolk)
- Saffron Walden (Hertfordshire/Cambridgeshire) (Note: Saffron Walden are based in Hertfordshire but are members of the Cambridgeshire RFU.)
- Sawston (Cambridgeshire)
- Shelford (Cambridgeshire)
- Southwold (Suffolk)
- Stowmarket (Suffolk)
- Sudbury (Suffolk)
- Suffolk College (Suffolk)
- Swaffham (Norfolk)
- Thetford (Norfolk)
- The Gents (Suffolk)
- Thorpeness (Suffolk)
- Thurston (Suffolk)
- UEA Trojans (Norfolk)
- Watton (Norfolk)
- Wendens Ambo (Cambridgeshire)
- West Norfolk (Norfolk)
- West Suffolk College (Suffolk)
- Wisbech (Cambridgeshire)
- Woodbridge (Suffolk)
- Wymondham (Norfolk)

== County Club Competitions ==
The Eastern Counties RU currently helps run the following competitions for clubs from Cambridgeshire, Norfolk, Suffolk and occasionally Essex:

=== Leagues ===
The Eastern Counties allows 2nd and 3rd teams to play alongside 1st teams providing they are not from the same club. Divisions include:

- Eastern Counties 1 - league at tier 9 of the English rugby union system, divided into three regional divisions with end of season play-offs
- Eastern Counties 2 - tier 10 league, divided into three regional divisions
- Eastern Counties 3 - tier 11 league, divided into three regional divisions

Discontinued

- Eastern Counties 4 - tier 11-12 league, discontinued in 2017
- Eastern Counties 5 - tier 12-13 league, discontinued in 1997
- Eastern Counties 6 - tier 13 league, discontinued in 1992

=== Cups ===
There is no Eastern Counties cup competition. Instead, each sub-county organizes its own cup competitions for local teams.

Cambridgeshire

- Cambridgeshire County Cup - premier cup competition in Cambridgeshire which features clubs from tiers 6-9 of the English rugby union system as well as invitee development teams from the Zoo Leagues
- Cambridgeshire Intermediate Cup - clubs from tiers 10–11
- Cambridgeshire Junior Cup - clubs from tiers 11

Norfolk

- Norfolk Senior Cup - premier cup competition in Norfolk which features clubs from tiers 6-7 of the English rugby union system
- Norfolk Cup - clubs at tiers 8–10
- Norfolk Bowl - 2nd teams only

Suffolk

- Suffolk Chadacre Cup - premier cup competition in Suffolk which features clubs from tiers 8-9 of the English rugby union system
- Suffolk Plate - clubs from tiers 10–11

== See also ==
- London & SE Division
- English rugby union system
