= North Walsham R.F.C. =

Rugby union club in Norfolk, England

(England) North Walsham RFC
- Full name: North Walsham Rugby Football Club
- Union: Eastern Counties RFU
- Founded: 1962; 64 years ago
- Location: The Clubhouse, Norwich Road, Scottow
- Ground: Norwich Road (Capacity: 1,600)
- Coach: (England) Will Cotterill
- Captain: (England)
- League: Regional 1 South East
- 2025–26: 6th
Team kit

Official website
- www.walshamvikings.club

North Walsham R.F.C. is a rugby union club representing the market town of North Walsham in Norfolk. Between 1990 and 2008, the club competed in National Division Three South, making it Norfolk's only national League rugby team. However, the team was relegated to London Division One for the 2008–09 season after a defeat against Lydney on 19 April 2008. They currently play in Regional 1 South East.

== Honours ==
1st team:

- London 1 North champions (2): 1987–88, 2019–20
- London Division 2 North East champions: 2012–13

2nd team:

- Eastern Counties Greene King Division 3 North champions: 2015–16

== Notable former players ==
- Ben Pienaar
- Calum Green
- Jacques Potgieter
- Toby Salmon
- Jack van Poortvliet

== Notable former internationals ==
- (England) Ben Youngs
- (England) Tom Youngs

== Teams ==
Minis: Boys and Girls play together: U6 U7 U8 U9 U10 U11

Youth: U11 U12 U13 U14 U15 U16 U17 Colts

Girls: U12 (Yrs 6, 7) U14 (Yrs 8, 9) U16 (Yrs 10, 11) U18 (Yrs 12, 13)
