= Colchester RFC =

English rugby union club, based in Colchester

Colchester
- Full name: Colchester Rugby Football Club
- Union: Eastern Counties RFU
- Nickname: Col
- Founded: 1925; 101 years ago
- Location: Colchester, Essex, England
- Ground(s): Raven Park, Cuckoo Farm Way, Colchester, CO4 5YX
- Coach: Mikey Haywood
- League: Regional 1 South East
- 2025/26: 1st (promoted to National League 2 East)

Official website
- www.colchesterrugby.co.uk

Colchester Rugby Football Club is an English rugby union club based in Colchester, Essex. The first XV team play in National League 2 East, at level 4 in the English rugby union system, following their promotion from Regional 1 South East at the end of 2025/26 season.

== Ground ==
Colchester play their home games at Raven Park. The ground is situated on the northern edge of the city, just off the A12. The complex consists of two AGP pitches, seven grass pitches and a clubhouse with a covered balcony. The main capacity is around 1,200, with 1,000 standing pitch side plus 200 in the clubhouse. The club moved to Raven Park in 2021, having previously been based at Mill Road which was sold off for housing.

== Honours ==
- London 3 North East
  - Champions: 1994/95
- Eastern Counties 2
  - Champions: 2001/02
- Eastern Counties 1
  - Champions: 2002/03
- London 2 (north-east v north-west)
  - Promotion play-off winner: 2009/10
- London 1 North
  - Champions: 2014/15
- London 1 North
  - Third (promoted): 2021/22
- Regional 1 South East
  - Champions: 2023/24, 2025/26
