= Maldon RFC =

English rugby union club, based in Essex

(England) Maldon RUFC
- Full name: Maldon Rugby Union Football Club
- Union: Essex RFU
- Nickname(s): 2nd XV Men - 'Vikings', 3rd XV Men - 'Abbotts'
- Founded: 1947; 79 years ago
- Ground: Drapers Farm
- Chairman: Dan Doherty
- President: Matt Ager
Main kit	Alt kit

Official website
- maldonrfc.rfu.club

Maldon Rugby Football Club is a rugby union club based in Heybridge, Maldon District, Essex. The 1st XV Men's team currently competes in Counties 1 Essex, which sits at the seventh tier of the English rugby union league system. The club colours are royal blue and white hoops.

== History ==
The first attempt to establish Rugby in Maldon was spearheaded by Mancunian Leslie Dexter between 1944 and 1946. His idea was to help servicemen get weekly recreation and to raise money for the Red Cross, by running seven-aside competitions against other teams.

The club was founded in the summer of 1947, by Welshman Tommy Harries, who was the landlord of The King's Head Hostelry (public house) on Maldon High Street. He called together a group of mainly ex-servicemen, many of Welsh origin, who played rugby. The inaugural meeting was held on 28 August at the Blue Boar Hotel. In September, the first game was played against Ipswich RFC.

In 1984 the club moved to its present headquarters at Drapers Farm; at this stage the league systems, which are still in place, were introduced. The 1990's was a particularly transformative time for Maldon RFC; with organised coaching and regular training, the club swiftly climbed the ranks from Eastern Counties 3 up to London 3 North East.

== Honours ==
=== 1st XV ===
- Unbeaten Essex 1 League Champions: 2021 - 2022
- Essex President's Shield Winners 2021 - 2022: postponed victory in 2023
- Unbeaten Counties 2 Essex League Champions: 2022 - 2023
- Essex Intermediate Cup Winners 2025 - 2026

=== 2nd XV ===
- John Adler Trophy Winners: 2022 - 2023
