= Billericay RFC =

English rugby union club, based in Billericay

(England) Billericay
- Full name: Billericay Rugby Union Football Club
- Union: Essex RFU
- Nickname(s): Bees, Black & Golds
- Founded: 1959; 67 years ago
- Location: Billericay
- Ground(s): Willowbrook, Stock Road (Capacity: 1,000)
- Chairman: Neil Jarvis
- Coach: Scott Last
- Captain: Tom Warr
- League: Counties 2 Essex
- 2024–25: 2nd (promoted to Counties 1 Essex
1st kit	2nd kit

Official website
- www.billericayrugby.com

Billericay Rugby Football Club is a rugby football club based in Billericay. The club runs three teams on a Saturday with the first XV competing in Counties 1 Essex. To support the club's long term ambitions and sustainability the club is building a youth section and welcome youngsters to come along and take up the game with us. These ambitions are set out within the Whole Club Development Plan, available to any member or interested party upon request.

== History ==
Billericay Rugby Football Club (BRFC) was formed in late 1959 by members of the St Johns Cricket Club with whom BRFC still share the Willowbrook Sports Ground. BRFCs first full fixture took place in February 1960 versus a Brentwood XV and since then the club has built steadily, maintaining an enjoyable but highly competitive outlook both on and off the pitch.

Extracts from a letter from Stan Ball, an early Club President:

"The person who originally had the idea to set up the club (which as you probably know was a section of the St.John's Sports Association Ltd) was Michael Price, uncle of the one and only Frank Price. I am fairly sure that it all started in 1959 and early records show that our first full fixture was against a Brentwood team on 27 February 1960, followed by a game against Billericay School pupils and staff on 19 March 1960. The team sheet from the Brentwood game includes my good self and I have a fixture list for the 1960-61 season.

One piece of useless information that might be of interest is that at one point Billericay RFC had a Barbarian who played occasionally. One of our regular players, John Cousins, had been at Trinity College Cambridge and had befriended a Cambridge blue by the name of Robin Jolliffe. Robin had been picked for the Barbarians on the wing whilst at Cambridge and was persuaded by John to turn out for Billericay on a couple of occasions!

Please give my best wishes to those ageing members of the club who might know me, and I extend an invitation to any Billericay members who might be in Jersey to come and enjoy a drink or two with me.

Kind regards,

Stan Ball Ex-President BRFC"

=== Recent history ===
On 17 April 1999, the rugby club became the first Eastern Counties side to play in a cup final at the home of English Rugby, Twickenham. Billericay took on Silhillians of the Midlands and won 19-3 through a try by John Bailey and the boot of player/coach Kevin Harman. Billericay were supported by approx. 10,000 people on finals day. Billericay amazingly repeated this feat in 2007 and played Hartpury College, a feeder club to Premiership side Gloucester, in a final at Twickenham on 12 May 2007. Losing 75-12 and becoming the only team to score more than 6 points against them all season.

The following excerpts are taken from letters written to current President (Keith Young) to help build his opening speech at our 50th Anniversary celebration which took place in May 2009. The club's origins give the reader a clear indication of the nostalgia and warmth with which each and every BRFC member, past and present, regards a very special club.

A Short history of Billericay Rugby Football Club - by A. J. Noquet.

"I moved to Billericay in the autumn of 1960. I was then 40 years old and promised my wife not to play any more rugby having played for Upper Clapton and Old Tottonians for some 14 years. My promise was soon broken as I met Bill Thorne in the Crown Pub one evening and he told me the club had just been formed and that my experience of small clubs was badly needed. Flattery gets you anywhere!

The club's origins trace to St. John's Cricket Club, which sold its ground in the Newlands Road area and used the proceeds to purchase seven acres at Willowbrook. The site was large enough to accommodate both a cricket square and one or two rugby pitches. Two cricketers, Richard Shipton and Stan Ball, also played rugby, and with the support of Bill Greenwood — a local businessman and former Yorkshire-level cricket player — Billericay Rugby Club was established. The first captain was a Scot from Melrose who also captained the City of London Police XV. Greenwood died of a heart attack later that year. The club continued and gradually developed a regular fixture list alongside a social programme.

The Club gathered pace in the sixties and both sides were run at the same time despite challenges. Along with the emigration of Ian Wilson (to New Zealand) and Bill Thorne (to Canada), the club welcomed Jack Angell from Costorphine, Edinburgh to Billericay.

I played until I was 45 and then refereed the A team games until I was 50."

A.J. Noquet Early BRFC Member

For the new 2013-14 season Billericay RFC is coached by the former Southend player David Hyett and Essex youth county coach Andy Goldsmith and led off the field by the returning chairman Andy Beck.

Off the field the club is led by President Keith Young and Chairman Neil Jarvis and together with the rest of the committee organise various events throughout the season. The most popular being their own rugby sevens tournament. Held on the last weekend of April, it is open to twelve invited teams and is played out alongside the weekend Beer Festival and BBQ. The teams play for the Cup, Shield and Plate competitions.

== Honours ==
- Eastern Counties 4 champions: 1994–95
- East Counties South champions: 1997–98
- Eastern Counties 2 champions: 1998–99
- Tetley Bitter Vase winners: 1999
- Essex Floodlight champions: 2006
- Essex Canterbury Jack 1 champions (2): 2006–07, 2013–14

== See also ==
- Essex RFU
