= English rugby union system =

League system for the sport of Rugby Union in England

Rugby union in England is organised as a multi-tier league pyramid linking fully professional national divisions to regional community competitions, with promotion and relegation connecting most levels. Since 2022–23, the RFU has operated a revised competition framework across the community game, and from 2023–24 promotion and relegation at the top has been conducted via a two-legged play-off between the Premiership’s bottom club and the RFU Championship winners, subject to minimum standards criteria. In the women’s game, Premiership Women’s Rugby (PWR) sits at the top of a pyramid administered under RFU competition regulations.

Men’s rugby union operates a tiered system from Premiership Rugby and the RFU Championship through National League 1 and National League 2 (East/West/North) to regional divisions, with promotion and relegation linking the tiers. League sizes and formats are set in RFU Regulation 6 and reviewed on a multi-year cycle.

Women’s rugby union follows a similar pyramid headed by Premiership Women’s Rugby (PWR), a semi-professional national competition run under RFU regulations. Entry and exit to PWR are managed by licence rather than automatic promotion and relegation; below the top tier are Championship 1 North and South and regional leagues.

== History ==
Historically, there were no leagues allowed as these were seen as a sign of professionalism. In the 1970s, the RFU allowed the creation of regional merit leagues with the most significant ones being the North, Midlands, South West and London merit leagues. In 1984, the RFU approved the creation of two national merit tables where clubs had to play a minimum of eight games against the clubs in their division. 1985 saw the creation of a third national merit league. In 1987, this was formed into a true national league system.

=== Previous restructures ===
The format and competitiveness of the leagues has changed greatly since the leagues were first formed and a widespread and global restructuring of the leagues was announced in November 2008, for implementation from the 2009–10 season. Under this new structure, the top league remained the 12-team Gallagher Premiership. The second tier league was rebranded and restructured as the RFU Championship, which replaced the old National Division One. This league also had 12 teams, and like the Premiership, is professional. Beneath the two professional leagues, the National Leagues were restructured to include a new 16 team National League 1, 16 team National League 2 South and 16 team National League 2 North. The four top regional leagues became part of National League 3 at level five.

For the 2017-18 season, the National League 3 leagues were renamed to have Premier as part of their title in order to make a distinction between regional rugby union and the National Leagues above. Other changes that season saw London 3 North East replaced by two new leagues - London 3 Eastern Counties and London 3 Essex - with teams transferred depending on location.

=== Recent restructures ===
==== Community game ====
In 2020, it was announced that a new league structure would be implemented in the community game from 2022–23. The new structure, which was partly in response to the COVID-19 pandemic, will be reviewed every three years and saw the following changes:

- The size of leagues at levels 3 and 4 are capped at 14 teams (down from 16).
- The size of leagues at level 5 and below are capped at 12 teams (down from 14).
- Level 4 will consist of three leagues (up from 2).
- Level 5 will consist of six leagues (up from 4).
- Level 6 will consist of twelve leagues (up from 8).
- A shortened season and protected breaks over Christmas and at specified other times for player welfare.
- Leagues largely regional based to reduce travel.
- An optional cup competition introduced for level 5 and below.

Below level 6, league sizes will depend on the number of teams and geographical location.

==== Professional game ====
In February 2021, the RFU approved a moratorium on relegation from both the Premiership and Championship in response to uncertainty caused by the COVID-19 pandemic. It was also confirmed that league structure and minimum standards criteria for promotion were being reviewed. The moratorium only covered relegation and did not include promotion from the Championship meaning the Premiership expanded to 13 teams with the Championship reduced to 11 in 2021–22 with the promotion of Saracens.

In June 2021, as part of the wider review, the moratorium was extended by a further two years in the Premiership and also included relegation from the Championship in 2021–22 and promotion from the Championship following the 2022–23 season. This means the Premiership may be further expanded to 14 teams in 2022–23 and the Championship may be reduced to 10. A summary of changes is outlines below:

- Premiership expanded to 13 teams in 2021–22; Championship reduced to 11
- Premiership may expand to 14 teams in 2022–23; Championship may reduce to 10. No team relegated from Premiership or promoted from Championship
- Introduction of a play-off between the bottom placed team in Premiership and top placed team in Championship in 2023–24 with the winner playing in the Premiership the following season.

Promotion remains subject to minimum standards, which have been reviewed and include several factors.

== Level 1: Premiership Rugby ==
Premiership Rugby is the top level league in England, containing the best 10 professional clubs. The premiership still includes strict ground criteria and a salary cap that must be met by all participants. Promotion from the Championship remains (subject to eligibility); however, the bottom sides have not been relegated since the end of the 2019–20 season. The club seeking promotion must meet the minimum standards criteria. The champion is the top team in the RFU Championship after the league season. A play-off system was previously in place to decide which team were crowned champions. It was hoped this would bring to an end a select number of clubs bouncing between the leagues. (For example, each season between 2005–06 and 2008–09 saw the club relegated to National Division One earning promotion to the Premiership the following season, and also either the promotion or relegation of Leeds Carnegie). Debate still continues over the question of promotion and relegation, but with the strict criteria fears are reduced. From 2023–24, the last placed team from the Premiership will playoff against the Championship winner (subject to promotion eligibility) for a place in the following season's Premiership.

== Level 2: RFU Championship ==
The new RFU Championship was formed in 2009–10 to provide a second tier of professional competition. The former National Division One was decreased from 16 clubs to 12 to accommodate the new fixture structure. For the first three seasons this included:

- a first phase of 22 regular season games
- for the top eight teams, a second group phase, with the teams split into two groups; the top two teams in each group advanced to promotion play-offs, with the winner earning promotion provided they met Premiership entry standards
- for the bottom four teams, a separate group phase, without a play-off, to determine the relegation place
- participation in a new British and Irish Cup with Irish, Scottish and Welsh clubs
- a minimum of 32 games per season

Starting with the 2012–13 season, the second group stage was discontinued. The top four teams at the end of the home-and-away season entered play-offs to determine the league champion, which earned promotion providing Premiership entry standards were met. The bottom team at the end of home-and-away season was relegated to, and replaced by the champions of, the third tier National League 1.

From 2017–18 through to 2019–20 and from 2021–22, the championship play-off was eliminated. The league-season champions earned automatic promotion (again, assuming that they meet Premiership standards). Relegation criteria did not change. However, there was a moratorium placed on relegation in both 2020–21 and 2021–22. From 2023–24, the winner (subject to eligibility) will contest a playoff with the bottom placed team in the Premiership for a place in the next season's Premiership.

== Levels 3-4: National Leagues ==
The new National League structure includes:

=== Level 3: National League 1 ===
The National League 1 was decreased from 16 to 14 teams. This resulted in a 26-game season on a home and away basis. The champions are promoted to the level 2 RFU Championship, and the bottom three sides are relegated to the level 4 National League 2 East, National League 2 West or National League 2 North depending on geographical location.

=== Level 4: National League 2 East, National League 2 West and National League 2 North ===
The fourth tier is increased to three leagues of 14 teams each. The three league champions are promoted, with the bottom two in each league relegated to their respective regional division.

== Regional leagues ==
With the restructuring, levels 5–6 became the new regional system. There are now six Regional 1 leagues and twelve Regional 2 leagues, which are connected to each other, the national leagues and the county leagues by promotion and relegation.

== The system ==
The table below shows the current structure of the system. For each division, its official name, sponsorship name (which differs from its historic name) and number of clubs is given. At levels 1–3, each division promotes to the national division(s) that lie directly above it and relegates to the national division(s) that lie directly below it. Below that level, clubs relegate to the nearest local league.

Level	League(s)/Division(s)																		
1	Prem Rugby; 10 clubs																		
2	Champ Rugby; 14 clubs																		
3	National League 1; 14 clubs																		
4	National League 2 North; 14 clubs				National League 2 East; 14 clubs							National League 2 West; 14 clubs							
5	Regional 1 North East; 12 clubs		Regional 1 North West; 12 clubs		Regional 1 South East; 12 clubs				Regional 1 South Central; 12 clubs			Regional 1 South West; 12 clubs				Regional 1 Midlands; 12 clubs			
6	Regional 2 North; 12 clubs		Regional 2 North East; 12 clubs	Regional 2 North West; 12 clubs	Regional 2 Anglia; 12 clubs		Regional 2 South East; 12 clubs		Regional 2 South Central; 12 clubs	Regional 2 Thames; 12 clubs		Regional 2 Severn; 12 clubs		Regional 2 South West; 12 clubs		Regional 2 Midlands West; 12 clubs		Regional 2 Midlands North; 12 clubs	Regional 2 Midlands East; 12 clubs
7	Counties 1 Cumbria; 12 clubs	North East Counties 1; 12 clubs	Counties 1 Yorkshire; 12 clubs	Counties 1 ADM Lancashire & Cheshire; 12 clubs	Counties 1 Eastern Counties; 12 clubs	Counties 1 Essex; 12 clubs	Counties 1 Kent; 12 clubs	Counties 1 Surrey/Sussex; 12 clubs	Counties 1 Hampshire; 12 clubs	Counties 1 Hertfordshire; 10 clubs	Counties 1 Middlesex; 10 clubs	Counties 1 Southern (North); 12 clubs	Counties 1 Southern (South); 12 clubs	Counties 1 Western (West); 12 clubs	Counties 1 Western (North); 12 clubs	Counties 1 Midlands West (South); 12 clubs	Counties 1 Midlands West (North); 12 clubs	Counties 1 Midlands East (North); 12 clubs	Counties 1 Midlands East (South); 12 clubs
8	Counties 2 Cumbria; Counties 2 ADM Lancashire & Cheshire; North East Counties 2 (North); North East Counties 2 (South); Counties 2 Yorkshire (A); Counties 2 Yorkshire (B)				Counties 2 Eastern Counties; Counties 2 Essex; Counties 2 Kent; Counties 2 Hampshire; Counties 2 Hertfordshire; Counties 2 Middlesex; Counties 2 Surrey; Counties 2 Sussex							Counties 2 Cornwall; Counties 2 Devon; Counties 2 Gloucestershire; Counties 2 Somerset; Counties 2 Berks/Bucks & Oxon (West); Counties 2 Berks/Bucks & Oxon (East); Counties 2 Dorset & Wilts (North); Counties 2 Dorset & Wilts (South)				Counties 2 Midlands West (West); Counties 2 Midlands West (East); Counties 2 Midlands East (North); Counties 2 Midlands East (South)			
9	Counties 3 ADM Lancashire & Cheshire; North East Counties 3 (North); North East Counties 3 (South); Counties 3 Yorkshire (A); Counties 3 Yorkshire (B)				Counties 3 Essex; Counties 3 Kent; Counties 3 Hampshire; Counties 3 Hertfordshire; Counties 3 Surrey							Counties 3 Cornwall; Counties 3 Devon (North & East); Counties 3 Devon (South & West); Counties 3 Gloucestershire (North); Counties 3 Gloucestershire (South); Counties 3 Somerset (North); Counties 3 Somerset (South); Counties 3 Berks/Bucks & Oxon (North); Counties 3 Berks/Bucks & Oxon (South); Counties 3 Dorset & Wilts (North); Counties 3 Dorset & Wilts (Central); Counties 3 Dorset & Wilts (South)				Counties 3 Midlands West (North); Counties 3 Midlands West (South); Counties 3 Midlands West (East); Counties 3 Midlands East (North West); Counties 3 Midlands East (North East); Counties 3 Midlands East (South North); Counties 3 Midlands East (South South)			
10	Counties 4 Yorkshire (A); Counties 4 Yorkshire (B); Counties 4 Yorkshire (C)				Counties 4 Kent; Counties 4 Hampshire; Counties 4 Surrey							Counties 4 Gloucestershire (North); Counties 4 Gloucestershire (South); Counties 4 Somerset (North); Counties 4 Somerset (South); Counties 4 Berks/Bucks & Oxon (North); Counties 4 Berks/Bucks & Oxon (South)				Counties 4 Midlands West (North); Counties 4 Midlands West (Central); Counties 4 Midlands West (South West); Counties 4 Midlands West (South East); Counties 4 Midlands East (North West); Counties 4 Midlands East (North East)			
11	n/a				Counties 5 Kent; Counties 5 Surrey							n/a				n/a			

== See also ==
- Rugby union in England
