= List of English rugby union teams =

The English men's rugby union league pyramid is topped by the Premiership. Below this are the Championship and National Leagues 1 to 3. Below this, the structure is split geographically into four regions: Midlands, North, London and South East, and South West. With the exception of the Midlands leagues, which only has regional splits, below these regional leagues are county leagues (e.g. Sussex, Kent, Hampshire). The county leagues are the lowest levels in the English game.

The English women's rugby union league pyramid is topped by Premiership Women's Rugby. Below this are Championship 1 & 2 and National Challenge 1 to 3.

== Men's Structure ==
Level	League(s)/Division(s)																		
1	Prem Rugby; 10 clubs																		
2	Champ Rugby; 14 clubs																		
3	National League 1; 14 clubs																		
4	National League 2 North; 14 clubs				National League 2 East; 14 clubs							National League 2 West; 14 clubs							
5	Regional 1 North East; 12 clubs		Regional 1 North West; 12 clubs		Regional 1 South East; 12 clubs				Regional 1 South Central; 12 clubs			Regional 1 South West; 12 clubs				Regional 1 Midlands; 12 clubs			
6	Regional 2 North; 12 clubs		Regional 2 North East; 12 clubs	Regional 2 North West; 12 clubs	Regional 2 Anglia; 12 clubs		Regional 2 South East; 12 clubs		Regional 2 South Central; 12 clubs	Regional 2 Thames; 12 clubs		Regional 2 Severn; 12 clubs		Regional 2 South West; 12 clubs		Regional 2 Midlands West; 12 clubs		Regional 2 Midlands North; 12 clubs	Regional 2 Midlands East; 12 clubs
7	Counties 1 Cumbria; 12 clubs	North East Counties 1; 12 clubs	Counties 1 Yorkshire; 12 clubs	Counties 1 ADM Lancashire & Cheshire; 12 clubs	Counties 1 Eastern Counties; 12 clubs	Counties 1 Essex; 12 clubs	Counties 1 Kent; 12 clubs	Counties 1 Surrey/Sussex; 12 clubs	Counties 1 Hampshire; 12 clubs	Counties 1 Hertfordshire; 10 clubs	Counties 1 Middlesex; 10 clubs	Counties 1 Southern (North); 12 clubs	Counties 1 Southern (South); 12 clubs	Counties 1 Western (West); 12 clubs	Counties 1 Western (North); 12 clubs	Counties 1 Midlands West (South); 12 clubs	Counties 1 Midlands West (North); 12 clubs	Counties 1 Midlands East (North); 12 clubs	Counties 1 Midlands East (South); 12 clubs
8	Counties 2 ADM Lancashire & Cheshire; North East Counties 2 (North); North East Counties 2 (South); Counties 2 Yorkshire (A); Counties 2 Yorkshire (B)				Counties 2 Eastern Counties; Counties 2 Essex; Counties 2 Kent; Counties 2 Hampshire; Counties 2 Hertfordshire; Counties 2 Middlesex; Counties 2 Surrey; Counties 2 Sussex							Counties 2 Cornwall; Counties 2 Devon; Counties 2 Gloucestershire; Counties 2 Somerset; Counties 2 Berks/Bucks & Oxon (West); Counties 2 Berks/Bucks & Oxon (East); Counties 2 Dorset & Wilts (North); Counties 2 Dorset & Wilts (South)				Counties 2 Midlands West (West); Counties 2 Midlands West (East); Counties 2 Midlands East (North); Counties 2 Midlands East (South)			
9	Counties 3 ADM Lancashire & Cheshire; North East Counties 3 (North); North East Counties 3 (South); Counties 3 Yorkshire (A); Counties 3 Yorkshire (B)				Counties 3 Essex; Counties 3 Kent; Counties 3 Hampshire; Counties 3 Hertfordshire; Counties 3 Surrey							Counties 3 Cornwall; Counties 3 Devon (North & East); Counties 3 Devon (South & West); Counties 3 Gloucestershire (North); Counties 3 Gloucestershire (South); Counties 3 Somerset (North); Counties 3 Somerset (South); Counties 3 Berks/Bucks & Oxon (North); Counties 3 Berks/Bucks & Oxon (South); Counties 3 Dorset & Wilts (North); Counties 3 Dorset & Wilts (Central); Counties 3 Dorset & Wilts (South)				Counties 3 Midlands West (North); Counties 3 Midlands West (South); Counties 3 Midlands West (East); Counties 3 Midlands East (North West); Counties 3 Midlands East (North East); Counties 3 Midlands East (South North); Counties 3 Midlands East (South South)			
10	Counties 4 Yorkshire (A); Counties 4 Yorkshire (B); Counties 4 Yorkshire (C)				Counties 4 Kent; Counties 4 Hampshire; Counties 4 Surrey							Counties 4 Gloucestershire (North); Counties 4 Gloucestershire (South); Counties 4 Somerset (North); Counties 4 Somerset (South); Counties 4 Berks/Bucks & Oxon (North); Counties 4 Berks/Bucks & Oxon (South)				Counties 4 Midlands West (North); Counties 4 Midlands West (Central); Counties 4 Midlands West (South); Counties 4 Midlands West (East); Counties 4 Midlands East (North West); Counties 4 Midlands East (North East)			
11	n/a				Counties 5 Kent; Counties 5 Surrey							n/a				n/a			

=== Premiership ===
- Bath
- Bristol Bears
- Exeter Chiefs
- Gloucester
- Harlequins
- Leicester Tigers
- Newcastle Falcons
- Northampton Saints
- Sale Sharks
- Saracens

=== RFU Championship ===
- Ampthill
- Bedford Blues
- Caldy
- Cambridge
- Chinnor
- Cornish Pirates (formerly Penzance and Newlyn)
- Coventry
- Doncaster Knights
- Ealing Trailfinders
- Hartpury University
- London Scottish
- Nottingham
- Richmond
- Worcester

=== National League 1 ===
- Birmingham Moseley
- Bishop's Stortford
- Blackheath
- Clifton
- Dings Crusaders
- Leeds Tykes
- Leicester Lions
- Plymouth Albion
- Rams
- Rosslyn Park
- Rotherham Titans
- Rosslyn Park
- Sale FC
- Sedgley Park
- Tonbridge Juddians

=== National League 2 ===
==== National League 2 North ====
- Billingham
- Chester
- Fylde
- Harrogate
- Hull
- Hull Ionians
- Leeds Tykes
- Lymm
- Otley
- Preston Grasshoppers
- Sheffield
- Sheffield Tigers
- Tynedale
- Wharfedale

==== National League 2 East ====
- Barnes
- Bury St Edmunds
- Canterbury
- Colchester
- Dorking
- Guernsey Raiders
- Havant
- Henley Hawks
- Old Albanians
- Oxford Harlequins
- Sevenoaks
- Tonbridge Juddians
- Westcombe Park
- Wimbledon
- Worthing Raiders

==== National League 2 West ====
- Bournville
- Camborne
- Cinderford
- Clifton
- Devonport Services
- Dudley Kingswinford
- Exeter University
- Hinckley
- Hornets
- Loughborough Students
- Luctonians
- Macclesfield
- Old Redcliffians
- Redruth
- Taunton Titans

=== Regional 1 ===
==== Regional 1 North East ====
- Alnwick
- Blaydon
- Cleckheaton
- Doncaster Phoenix
- Driffield
- Heath
- Ilkley
- Pontefract
- Sandal
- Scunthorpe
- York

==== Regional 1 North West ====
- Anselmians
- Blackburn
- Kendal
- Leek
- Manchester
- Northwich
- Penrith
- Rossendale
- Sandbach
- Stockport
- Wirral

==== Regional 1 Midlands ====
- Banbury
- Bridgnorth
- Broadstreet
- Bromsgrove
- Burton
- Derby
- Kenilworth
- Old Halesonians
- Stoke-on-Trent
- Stourbridge
- Syston

==== Regional 1 South West ====
- Barnstaple
- Brixham
- Chew Valley
- Exmouth
- Ivybridge
- Launceston
- Lydney
- Matson
- Okehampton
- St Austell
- Weston-super-Mare

==== Regional 1 South Central ====
- Bournemouth
- Bracknell
- Brighton
- Camberley
- CS Rugby 1863
- Hammersmith & Fulham
- Horsham
- London Welsh
- Marlborough
- Tunbridge Wells

==== Regional 1 South East ====
- Bedford Athletic
- Harpenden
- Hertford
- Letchworth
- Old Northamptonians
- Oundle
- Rochford Hundred
- Shelford
- Sudbury
- Tring
- Westcliff

=== Regional 2 ===
==== Regional 2 North ====
- Aspatria
- Cockermouth
- Consett
- Durham City
- Keswick
- Middlesbrough
- Morpeth
- Northern
- Percy Park
- Stockton
- Upper Eden
- West Hartlepool

==== Regional 2 North East ====
- Bridlington
- Dronfield
- Glossop
- Malton and Norton
- Moortown
- Morley
- Old Brodleians
- Old Crossleyans
- Rochdale
- Scarborough
- Selby

==== Regional 2 North West ====
- Altrincham Kersal
- Birkenhead Park
- Bowden
- Burnage
- Crewe & Nantwich
- Douglas
- Firwood Waterloo
- Kirkby Lonsdale
- Liverpool St Helens
- Vale of Lune
- Whitchurch
- Winnington Park

==== Regional 2 Anglia ====
- Brentwood
- Chelmsford
- Dagenham
- Eton Manor
- Harlow
- Holt
- Norwich
- Saffron Walden
- Southend Saxons
- Stowmarket
- Thurrock
- Woodford

==== Regional 2 South East ====
- Battersea Ironsides
- Beckanham
- Cobham
- Gravesend
- London Cornish
- Medway
- Old Alleynians
- Old Colfeians
- Old Reigatians
- Reeds Weybridge
- Sidcup
- Sutton & Epsom

==== Regional 2 Thames ====
- Amersham & Chiltern
- Aylesbury
- Belsize Park
- Chobham
- Fullerians
- Grasshoppers
- H.A.C.
- Hemel Hempstead
- Marlow
- Old Haberdashers
- Old Priorians

==== Regional 2 South Central ====
- Chichester
- Farnham
- Guildford
- Jersey
- London Irish Wild Geese
- Newbury Blues
- Reading
- Salisbury
- Tottonians
- Wimborne
- Winchester
- Witney

==== Regional 2 South West ====
- Burnham-on-Sea
- Chard
- Crediton
- Cullompton
- Newton Abbot
- North Petherton
- Sidmouth
- Teignmouth
- Truro
- Wadebridge Camels
- Wellington

==== Regional 2 Severn ====
- Chippenham
- Chosen Hill Former Pupils
- Devizes
- Drybrook
- Gordano
- Keynsham
- Old Centralians
- Royal Wootton Bassett
- Swindon
- Thornbury
- Trowbridge
- Winscombe

==== Regional 2 West Midlands ====
- Berkswell & Balsall
- Cheltenham
- Hereford
- Ludlow
- Malvern
- Moseley Oak
- Newent
- Shipston on Stour
- Silhilians
- Stow-on-the-Wold
- Stratford upon Avon
- Worcester

==== Regional 2 North Midlands ====
- Lichfield
- Long Eaton
- Matlock
- Melbourne
- Melish
- Newark
- Paviors
- Walsall
- West Bridgford
- Wolverhampton

==== Regional 2 East Midlands ====
- Kettering
- Leicester Forest
- Lutterworth
- Market Harborough
- Newbold on Avon
- Northampton Old Scouts
- Nuneaton
- Oadby Wyggestonians
- Olney
- Peterborough
- Towcestrians
- Wellingborough

== Women's Structure ==
=== Premiership Women's Rugby ===
- Bristol Bears
- Exeter Chiefs
- Gloucester-Hartpury
- Harlequins
- Leicester Tigers
- Loughborough Lightning
- Northampton Saints
- Sale Sharks
- Saracens
- Trailfinders

=== Championship 1 ===
==== Championship North 1 ====
- Barnsley
- Blaydon Red Kites
- Buckingham Swans
- Bury St Edmunds
- Cheltenham Tigers
- Kenilworth
- Lichfield
- Novocastrians
- Sale FC
- West Park Leeds

==== Championship South 1 ====
- Bath
- Exeter Athletic Dakota
- Henley Hawks
- London Irish
- North Bristol
- Old Albanian Saints
- Richmond
- Sutton & Epsom
- Thurrock
- Trojans

=== Championship 2 ===
==== Championship North 2 ====
- Bishop Auckland
- Birkenhead Park
- Chester Devas
- Driffield
- Halifax
- Kendal Wasps
- Liverpool St Helens
- Manchester
- Sefton
- Sheffield

==== Championship Midlands 2 ====
- Bridgnorth
- Cannock Lionesses
- Long Eaton
- Old Albanian Saints (2nd XV)
- Peterborough
- Shelford
- Sudbury
- Sutton Coldfield

==== Championship South East 2 ====
- Battersea Ironsides
- Beckenham
- Blackheath
- Dartford Valley
- Hackney
- Hammersmith & Fulham
- Hampstead
- Heathfield & Waldron
- Old Alleynians
- Thurrock (2nd XV)

==== Championship South West 2 ====
- Cheltenham Tigers (2nd XV)
- Cullompton
- Guildford Gazelles
- Havant
- Ivybridge
- Launceston
- Newbury
- Oxford Harlequins
- Reading Abbey

=== National Challenge 1 ===
==== National Challenge 1 North ====
- Carlisle Cougars
- Harrogate
- Keswick
- Lancaster Lionesses
- Peterlee & Horden
- Ryton
- Workington

==== National Challenge 1 North (South) ====
- Broughton Park
- Doncaster Demons
- Eccles
- Leigh
- Lincoln
- Sheffield Tigers
- Southport
- Trafford MV

==== National Challenge 1 Midlands (West) ====
- Aston Old Edwardians
- Birmingham Moseley
- Bournville
- Buckingham Swans (2nd XV)
- Coalville
- Derby
- Handsworth
- Lichfield (2nd XV)
- Old Leamingtonians
- West Bridgford

==== National Challenge 1 East ====
- Bedford Blues
- Colchester Iceni
- Harpenden
- Hitchin
- Ipswich
- Stamford
- West Norfolk Warriors
- Wymondham Wasps

==== National Challenge 1 South East (North) ====
- Barnes
- Battersea Ironsides (2nd XV)
- Bec Belles
- Belsize Park
- East London Vixens
- Eton Manor
- Thamesians
- Wasps FC
- Welwyn
- Westcliff

==== National Challenge 1 South East (South) ====
- Aylesford Bulls
- Canterbury
- Dorking
- Horsham
- Hove
- Jersey
- Medway
- Portsmouth Valkyries

==== National Challenge 1 South West (West) ====
- Avonmouth
- Crediton
- Dings Crusaders Mavericks
- Hornets
- Okehampton
- Penryn
- Winscombe
- Yeovil

==== National Challenge 1 South West (East) ====
- Amesbury
- Bath (2nd XV)
- Chinnor Kites
- Drybrook
- Ellingham & Ringwood
- Hucclecote
- Melksham
- North Bristol (2nd XV)
- Reading Kites
- Supermarine
