= London 1 North =

Defunct English rugby union league

- Sport: Rugby union
- Instituted: 1987; 39 years ago (as London 2 North)
- Number of teams: 14
- Country: Englandle)
- Holders: Shelford (2nd in (2021–22) promoted to Regional 1 South East)
- Most titles: Cheshunt (3 titles)
- Website: englandrugby.com

London 1 North was an English level 6, rugby union league for clubs in London and the south-east of England including sides from Bedfordshire, Buckinghamshire, Cambridgeshire, Essex, north Greater London, Hertfordshire, Norfolk, Suffolk. When this division began in 1987 it was known as London 2 North, changing to its final name ahead of the 2009–10 season.

The fourteen teams played home and away matches from September through to April. The first placed team in the league won promotion to London & South East Premier while the league runner-up played the second placed team from London 1 South in a play-off for promotion. Relegated teams dropped to either London 2 North East or London 2 North West depending on the location of the club.

The Rugby Football Union reorganised the level six leagues for season 2022–23, with an increase from eight to twelve leagues, and a reduction of the teams in each from fourteen to twelve. The teams in this league were transferred to either Regional 2 Anglia, Regional 2 Thames or Regional 2 East Midlands.

== 2021–22 (final season) ==
The teams competing in 2021–22 achieved their places in the league based on performances in 2019–20, the 'previous season' column in the table below refers to that season not 2020–21.

Ten of the fourteen teams from 2021 to 2022 were placed into one of the new level six leagues for 2022–23. Amersham & Chiltern, Belsize Park and Old Haberdashers were placed into Regional 2 Thames, while Brentwood, Chingford, Eton Manor, Norwich, Southend Saxons and Thurrock were placed into Regional 2 Anglia. Leighton Buzzard were placed into Regional 2 East Midlands. The top four teams in 2021–22, Colchester, Harpenden, Shelford and Sudbury, were promoted to the level five league Regional 1 South East. No teams were relegated to level seven.

Team	Ground	Capacity	City/Area	Previous season
Amersham & Chiltern	Weedon Lane		Amersham, Buckinghamshire	11th
Belsize Park	Regent's Park		Belsize Park, London	Level transfer from London 1 South (6th)
Brentwood	King George's Playing Fields	3,000	Brentwood, Essex	8th
Chingford	Lea Valley Playing Fields		Chingford, London	10th
Colchester	Raven Park	1,200	Colchester, Essex	Runners up (Westcombe Park promoted from London 1 South on points)
Eton Manor	The New Wilderness		Wanstead, London	5th
Harpenden	Redbourn Lane		Harpenden, Hertfordshire	4th
Leighton Buzzard	Wright's Meadow		Leighton Buzzard, Bedfordshire	Promoted from Midlands 2 East (South) (Champions)
Norwich	Beeston Hyrne		Norwich, Norfolk	Promoted from London 2 North East (Champions)
Old Haberdashers	Croxdale Road		Borehamwood, Hertfordshire	3rd
Shelford	The Davey Field	2,000 (150 seats)	Great Shelford, Cambridgeshire	9th
Southend Saxons	Warners Park	1,500 (150 seats)	Southend-on-Sea, Essex	6th
Sudbury	Whittome Field		Great Cornard, Sudbury, Suffolk	7th
Thurrock	Oakfield		Grays, Essex	Level transfer from London 1 South (10th)

Locations of the 2021–22 London 1 North teams in Beds, Herts, Essex, Suffolk & Norfolk
Location of 2021–22 London 1 North teams in London

== 2020–21 ==
On 30 October 2020 the RFU announced that due to the coronavirus pandemic a decision had been taken to cancel Adult Competitive Leagues (National League 1 and below) for the 2020–21 season meaning London 1 North was not contested.

== Teams 2019–20 ==
Team	Ground	Capacity	City/Area	Previous season
Amersham & Chiltern	Weedon Lane		Amersham, Buckinghamshire	7th
Brentwood	King George's Playing Fields	3,000	Brentwood, Essex	Relegated from LSE Premier (13th)
Chingford	Lea Valley Playing Fields		Chingford, London	Relegated from LSE Premier (12th)
Colchester	Mill Road Playing Fields		Colchester, Essex	Runners up (lost playoff)
Eton Manor	The New Wilderness		Wanstead, London	9th
Harpenden	Redbourn Lane		Harpenden, Hertfordshire	Promoted from London 2 NW (playoff)
North Walsham	Norwich Road	1,600	Scottow, Norfolk	3rd
Old Haberdashers	Croxdale Road		Borehamwood, Hertfordshire	4th
Old Priorians	Perivale		Greenford, London	8th
Ruislip	West End Road		Ruislip, London	11th
Shelford	The Davey Field	2,000 (150 seats)	Great Shelford, Cambridgeshire	Relegated from LSE Premier (14th)
Southend Saxons	Warners Park	1,500 (150 seats)	Southend-on-Sea, Essex	6th
Sudbury	Whittome Field		Great Cornard, Sudbury, Suffolk	10th
Woodford	Highams		Woodford, London	Promoted from London 2 NE (champions)

Locations of the 2019–20 London 1 North teams
Location of 2019–20 London 1 North teams in London

== Teams 2018–19 ==
Team	Ground	Capacity	City/Area	Previous season
Amersham & Chiltern	Weedon Lane		Amersham, Buckinghamshire	4th
Colchester	Mill Road Playing Fields		Colchester, Essex	3rd
Diss	Mackenders		Roydon, Norfolk	11th
Eton Manor	The New Wilderness		Wanstead, London	5th
Fullerians	Coningsby Drive		Watford, Hertfordshire	9th
H.A.C.	Artillery Ground		Finsbury, London	Promoted from London 2 NW (champions)
Luton	Newlands Road		Luton, Bedfordshire	Promoted from Midlands 2 East (South) (playoff & level transfer)
North Walsham	Norwich Road	1,600	Scottow, Norfolk	6th
Old Haberdashers	Croxdale Road		Borehamwood, Hertfordshire	7th
Old Priorians	Perivale		Greenford, London	8th
Rochford Hundred	The Rugby Park	1,000	Hawkwell, Rochford, Essex	Promoted from London 2 NE (champions)
Ruislip	West End Road		Ruislip, London	10th
Southend Saxons	Warners Park	1,500 (150 seats)	Southend-on-Sea, Essex	Relegated from LSE Premier (13th)
Sudbury	Whittome Field		Great Cornard, Sudbury, Suffolk	Promoted from London 2 NE (playoff)

Locations of the 2018–19 London 1 North teams
Location of 2018–19 London 1 North teams in London

== Teams 2017–18 ==
Team	Ground	Capacity	City/Area	Previous season
Amersham & Chiltern	Weedon Lane		Amersham, Buckinghamshire	Relegated from National 3 London & SE (14th)
Brentwood	King George's Playing Fields	3,000	Brentwood, Essex	3rd
Chingford	Lea Valley Playing Fields		Chingford, London	2nd (lost playoff)
Colchester	Mill Road Playing Fields		Colchester, Essex	Relegated from National 3 London & SE (13th)
Diss	Mackenders		Roydon, Norfolk	Promoted from London 2 North East (champions)
Eton Manor	The New Wilderness		Wanstead, London	5th
Fullerians	Coningsby Drive		Watford, Hertfordshire	11th
Letchworth Garden City	Baldock Road		Letchworth, Hertfordshire	9th
North Walsham	Norwich Road	1,600	Scottow, Norfolk	4th
Old Haberdashers	Croxdale Road		Borehamwood, Hertfordshire	Promoted from London 2 North West (champions)
Old Priorians	Perivale		Greenford, London	10th
Ruislip	West End Road		Ruislip, London	7th
Saffron Walden	Chickney Road		Henham, Essex	8th
South Woodham Ferrers	Saltcoats Playing Field		South Woodham Ferrers, Essex	Promoted from London 2 North East (playoffs)

Locations of the 2018–19 London 1 North teams
Location of 2017–18 London 1 North teams in London

== Teams 2016–17 ==
- Barking
- Brentwood
- Chelmsford (promoted from London 2 North East)
- Chingford
- Eton Manor (relegated from National League 3 London & SE)
- Fullerians (promoted from London 2 North West)
- Letchworth Garden City
- North Walsham
- Old Priorians
- Ruislip
- Saffron Walden (promoted from London 2 North East)
- Sudbury (promoted from London 2 North East)
- Thurrock
- Tring

== Teams 2015–16 ==
Amersham & Chiltern, the champions, are promoted to National League 3 London & SE for next season. There are only two relegated clubs (Harrow and Luton) as East Grinstead took voluntary relegation from the National League 3 London & SE to the Sussex Leagues.

- Amersham & Chiltern (relegated from National League 3 London & SE)
- Barking
- Brentwood
- Chelmsford (promoted from London 2 North East)
- Chingford
- CS Rugby 1863 (relegated from National League 3 London & SE)
- Harrow (promoted from London 2 North West)
- Letchworth Garden City
- Luton
- North Walsham
- Old Priorians
- Ruislip
- Thurrock
- Tring (relegated from National League 3 London & SE)

== Teams 2014–15 ==
- Barking (relegated from National League 3 London & SE)
- Brentwood
- Chingford
- Colchester
- Eton Manor
- Ipswich (promoted from London 2 North East)
- Letchworth Garden City
- Luton
- North Walsham
- Old Priorians (promoted from London 2 North West)
- Romford & Gidea Park
- Ruislip
- Thurrock (relegated from National League 3 London & SE)
- Woodford

== Teams 2013–14 ==
- Brentwood
- Chingford
- Colchester
- Diss
- Eton Manor
- Letchworth Garden City
- Luton
- North Walsham
- Old Haberdashers
- Romford & Gidea Park
- Ruislip
- Tabard (promoted from London 2 North West)
- Westcliff (relegated from National League 3 London & SE)
- Woodford (promoted from London 2 North East)

== Teams 2012–13 ==
- Basildon
- Beaconsfield
- Brentwood
- Bury St Edmunds
- Chingford
- Colchester
- Diss
- Eton Manor
- Letchworth Garden City
- Luton (relegated from National League 3 London & SE)
- Old Haberdashers
- Rochford Hundred
- Romford & Gidea Park
- Ruislip

== Teams 2011–12 ==
- Braintree
- Brentwood
- Bury St Edmunds
- Chingford
- Colchester
- Diss (relegated from National League 3 London & SE)
- Eton Manor
- Hammersmith & Fulham
- Letchworth Garden City
- North Walsham (relegated from National League 3 London & SE)
- Old Colfeians
- Rochford Hundred
- Ruislip
- Thurrock

== Teams 2009–10 ==
- Braintree
- Brentwood
- Bury St Edmunds
- Chingford
- Colchester
- Eton Manor
- Hammersmith & Fulham
- Letchworth Garden City
- North Walsham
- Old Colfeians
- Rochford Hundred
- Ruislip
- Thurrock

== Original teams ==
When league rugby began in 1987 this division (known as London 2 North) and contained the following teams:

- Cheshunt
- Grasshoppers
- Hertford
- North Walsham
- Norwich
- Old Albanian
- Old Merchant Taylors'
- St. Mary's Hospital (Note: In 1997 St. Mary's Hospital become part of Imperial Medicals Rugby Club.)
- Thurrock
- Woodford

== London 1 North honours ==
=== London 2 North (1987–1993) ===
In the first season of the English rugby union league pyramid, sponsored by Courage, there was six, tier six leagues. The initial name was London 2 North and was for teams based in London and the counties of Hertfordshire, Middlesex, Essex, Cambridgeshire, Suffolk and Norfolk. There was eleven teams in the league and each team played one match against each of the other teams, giving each team five home matches and five away matches. The winning team was awarded two points, and there was one point for each team in a drawn match.

The original London 2 North was a tier 6 league with promotion to London 1 and relegation to either London 3 North East or London 3 North West.

London 2 North
Season	No of teams	No of matches	Champions	Runners-up	Relegated teams	Reference
1987–88	10 (Note: League reduced from 11 to 10 teams after West London Institute withdrew.)	9	North Walsham	Grasshoppers	St. Mary's Hospital	
1988–89	11	10	Cheshunt	Bishop's Stortford	Hertford, Upper Clapton	
1989–90	11	10	Thurrock	Eton Manor	Grasshoppers	
1990–91	11	10	Eton Manor	Bishop's Stortford	Old Albanian	
1991–92	11	10	Tabard	Barking	Old Merchant Taylor's, Letchworth Garden City	
1992–93	13	12	Harlow	Cheshunt	No relegation	

=== London 2 North (1993–1996) ===
At the end of the 1992–93 season the top six teams from London Division 1 and the top six from South West Division 1 were combined to create National 5 South. This meant that London 2 North dropped from a tier 6 league to a tier 7 league for the years that National 5 South was active. Promotion continued to London 1 and relegation to either London 3 North East or London 3 North West.

London 2 North
Season	No of teams	No of matches	Champions	Runners-up	Relegated teams	Reference
1993–94	13	12	Ruislip	Verulamians	Old Edwardians, Upper Clapton	
1994–95	13	12	Staines	Verulamians	Old Gaytonians, Chingford	
1995–96	13	12	Norwich	Thurrock	Eton Manor, Hertford	

=== London 2 North (1998–2009) ===
The cancellation of National 5 South at the end of the 1995–96 season meant that London 2 North reverted to being a tier 6 league. Promotion continued to London 1 and relegation to either London 3 North East or London 3 North West (renamed to London 2 North East and London 2 North West from the 2000–01 season onward).

London Division 2 North
Season	No of teams	Champions	Runners–up	Relegated teams	Reference
1996–97	12	Cheshunt	Bishop's Stortford	No relegation (Note: There would be no relegation due to the league increased from 12 to 17 teams for the following season.)	
1997-98	17	Woodford	Bishop's Stortford	Ealing	
1998–99	17	Cambridge	Ipswich	Chingford, Colchester	
1999–00	17	London Nigerian	Bishop's Stortford	Multiple teams (Note: Lowestoft & Yarmouth, Braintree, Finchley, Southend, Brentwood and Barnet Elizabethans were the relegated teams this year. The reason for so many relegated teams was due to the creation of a new division 4 for the next season in the London league which would lead to a restructure of the whole league including a downsizing of this division from 17 teams to 12 teams.)	
2000–01	12	Cheshunt	London Nigerian	Chelmsford, Romford & Gidea Park, Ruislip	
2001–02	12	Hertford	Southend	Metropolitan Police, Verulamians	
2002–03	12	Bishop's Stortford	Old Albanian	Sudbury, Ipswich, Shelford	
2003–04	12	London Scottish	Cambridge	Cheshunt, Romford & Gidea Park, Bank of England	
2004–05	12	Ealing Trailfinders	Staines	Harlow, Diss, Woodford	
2005–06	12	Shelford	CS Rugby 1863	Bank of England, Hadleigh	
2006–07	12	CS Rugby 1863	Tring	Twickenham, St Albans, Norwich	
2007–08	12	Tring	Staines	Tabard, Thurrock, London Nigerian	
2008–09	12	Diss	Staines	No relegation due to league restructure (Note: The division would be renamed London Division 1 North for the next season and along with the whole national restructure of the league system by the RFU lead to mass changes at all levels.)	
Green backgrounds are promotion places.

=== London 1 North ===
London 2 North was renamed to London 1 North from the 2009–10 season onward. It continued as a tier 6 league with promotion to National League 3 London & South East (formerly London 1 and currently known as London & South East Premier) and relegation to London 2 North East and London 2 North West (formerly London 3 North East and London 3 North West).

London Division 1 North
Season	No of teams	Champions	Runners–up	Relegated teams	Reference
2009–10	14	Staines	CS Rugby 1863	Welwyn, Harpenden, Rochford Hundred	
2010–11	14	Westcliff	Sidcup	Woodford, Tabard, Stevenage Town	
2011–12	14	Thurrock	Colchester	Braintree, Hammersmith & Fulham, North Walsham	
2012–13	14	Bury St Edmunds	Eton Manor	Basildon, Rochford Hundred, Beaconsfield	
2013–14	14	Westcliff	Eton Manor	Old Haberdashers, Diss, Tabard	
2014–15	14	Colchester	Eton Manor	Woodford, Romford & Gidea Park, Ipswich	
2015–16	14	Amersham & Chiltern	Tring	Luton, Harrow (Note: After finishing 12th, Barking were due to be relegated but due to East Grinstead's voluntary relegation from National League 3 London & SE (all the way to level 10), the club were granted a reprieve from relegation and would remain in London 1 North for the 2016-17 season.)	
2016–17	14	Tring	Chingford	Barking, Chelmsford, Sudbury	
2017–18	14	Brentwood	Chingford	South Woodham Ferrers, Letchworth Garden City, Saffron Walden	
2018–19	14	Rochford Hundred	Colchester	Diss, Luton, Fullerians	
2019–20	14	North Walsham	Colchester	Ruislip, Woodford, Old Priorians	
2020–21	14	Cancelled due to the COVID-19 pandemic in the United Kingdom.			
2021–22	14	Shelford	Sudbury	No relegation	
Green backgrounds are promotion places.

== Promotion play-offs ==
Between 2000 and 2001 season and 2019–20 there was a play-off between the runners-up of London 1 North and London 1 South for the third and final promotion place to London & South East Premier. The team with the superior league record had home advantage in the tie. At the end of the 2019–20 season the London 1 South teams have been the most successful with eleven wins to the London 1 North teams eight; and the home team has won promotion on thirteen occasions compared to the away teams six.

London 1 (north v south) promotion play-off results
Season	Home team	Score	Away team	Venue	Attendance
2000-01	Canterbury (S)	21-27	London Nigerian (N)	Merton Lane, Canterbury, Kent	
2001-02	Southend (N)	37-15	Portsmouth (S)	Warners Park, Southend-on-Sea, Essex	
2002-03	Old Albanian (2nd XV) (N)	28-12	Portsmouth (S)	Woollam Playing Fields, St Albans, Hertfordshire	
2003-04	Cambridge (N)	21-19	Barnes (S)	Grantchester Road, Cambridge, Cambridgeshire	
2004-05	Staines (N)	55-12	Portsmouth (S)	The Reeves, Hanworth, Greater London	
2005-06	Guildford (S)	27-14	CS Rugby 1863 (N)	Broadwater Sports Club, Farncombe, Surrey	
2006-07	Tring (N)	7-20	Thanet Wanderers (S)	Cow Lane, Tring, Hertfordshire	
2007-08	Jersey (S)	15-0	Staines (S)	St. Peter, Saint Peter, Jersey	
2008-09	Staines (N)	7-11	Dorking (S)	The Reeves, Hanworth, Greater London	
2009-10	CS Rugby 1863 (N)	31-14	Dover (S)	King's House Sports Ground, Chiswick, Greater London	
2010-11	London Irish Wild Geese (S)	21-14	Sidcup (N)	Hazelwood, Sunbury-on-Thames, Surrey	1,000
2011-12	Old Elthamians (S)	16-8	Colchester (N)	Foxbury Avenue, Chislehurst, Greater London	600
2012-13	Basingstoke (S)	27-3	Eton Manor (N)	Down Grange, Basingstoke, Hampshire	
2013-14	Chichester (S)	25-16	Eton Manor (N)	Oaklands Park, Chichester, West Sussex	
2014-15	Eton Manor (N)	17-14	Chobham (S)	The New Wilderness, Redbridge, London	400
2015-16	Tring (N)	21-26	Guildford (S)	Cow Lane, Tring, Hertfordshire	700
2016–17	Chingford (N)	33-35	Tunbridge Wells (S)	Lea Valley Playing Fields, Chingford, London	500
2017-18	Chingford (N)	21-17	Medway (S)	Lea Valley Playing Fields, Chingford, London	500
2018-19	Colchester (N)	26-33	Brighton (S)	Mill Road Playing Fields, Colchester, Essex	
2019–20	Cancelled due to COVID-19 pandemic in the United Kingdom. Best ranked runner up - Westcombe Park (S) - promoted instead.				
2020–21	Cancelled due to the COVID-19 pandemic in the United Kingdom.				
2021–22	Cancelled due to the reorganisation of the league				
Green background is the promoted team. N = London 1 North (formerly London 2 North) and S = London 1 South (formerly London 2 South).

== Number of league titles ==
- Cheshunt (3)
- North Walsham (2)
- Shelford (2)
- Staines (2)
- Thurrock (2)
- Tring (2)
- Westcliff (2)
- Amersham & Chiltern (1)
- Bishop's Stortford (1)
- Brentwood (1)
- Bury St Edmunds (1)
- Cambridge (1)
- Colchester (1)
- CS Rugby 1863 (1)
- Diss (1)
- Ealing Trailfinders (1)
- Eton Manor (1)
- Harlow (1)
- Hertford (1)
- London Nigerian (1)
- London Scottish (1)
- Norwich (1)
- Rochford Hundred (1)
- Ruislip (1)
- Tabard (1)
- Woodford (1)

== See also ==
- London & SE Division RFU
- Eastern Counties RFU
- Essex RFU
- Hertfordshire RFU
- Middlesex RFU
- English rugby union system
- Rugby union in England
