= Essex 2 =

Defunct rugby union league in Essex

- Current season or competition: 2013-14 Essex Spitfire 2
- Sport: Rugby union
- Instituted: 2003; 23 years ago
- Ceased: 2014; 12 years ago
- Number of teams: 9
- Country: England
- Holders: May & Baker (1st title) (2013–14) (promoted to Essex 1)
- Most titles: Millwall, Writtle Wanderers (2 titles)
- Website: southeastrugby.co.uk

Counties 3 Essex (formerly known as Essex 2 or Essex Spitfire 2 for sponsorship reasons) is an English Rugby Union league at the ninth tier of the domestic competition.

It was the basement division of club rugby in Essex with promoted teams moving up to Essex 1 and no relegation (up until 2008-09 relegated teams dropped to Essex 3 but this division has since been abolished). Essex 2 was created in 2003 by Essex-based teams who left East Counties 3 South. At the end of the 2013–14 season the division was abolished with teams either moving up into Essex 1 or into various Essex Merit leagues.

However, ahead of season 2026-27 the league was reinstated under the new name Counties 3 Essex with promotion to Counties 2 Essex.

== Participating clubs 2026-27 ==
This was the first season of the newly reinstated league with four clubs joining from Counties 2 Essex and the remainder joining the RFU leagues for the first time or rejoining after a period of absence.

Initially Thames RFC were due to join the league but they withdrew before the season began to be replaced by Runwell Wyverns.

Team	Ground	Capacity	City/Area	Previous season
Brentwood II	King George's Playing Fields	3,000	Brentwood, Essex	New entry
Clacton	Valley Road		Clacton-on-Sea, Essex	Demoted from Counties 2 Essex (9th)
Eton Manor III	The New Wilderness		Wanstead, London	New entry
Kelvedon & Feering	Rye Mill Lane		Feering, Essex	Re-entry
Millwall	Millwall Park		Isle of Dogs, London	Demoted from Counties 2 Essex (8th)
Old Cooperians	Coopers' Company & Corborn School		Upminster, London	Re-entry
Rochford Hundred II	The Rugby Park	1,000	Hawkwell, Rochford, Essex	New entry
Runwell Wyverns	Runwell Sports and Social Club		Wickford, Essex	New entry
Witham	Witham Town Football & Social Club		Witham, Essex	Demoted from Counties 2 Essex (7th)
Writtle Wanderers	Paradise Road, Writtle		Writtle, Chelmsford, Essex	Demoted from Counties 2 Essex (10th)

Locations of the 2026-27 Counties 3 Essex teams

== 2014-26 ==
Not contested

== Original teams ==
When Essex 2 was introduced in 2003 it contained the following teams:

- Bancroft - transferred from Eastern Counties 2 South (4th)
- Burnham-On-Crouch - transferred from Eastern Counties 2 South (7th)
- Dagenham - transferred from Eastern Counties 2 South (8th)
- Loughton - transferred from Eastern Counties 3 South (3rd)
- Old Brentwoods - transferred from Eastern Counties 2 South (5th)
- Old Edwardians - transferred from Eastern Counties 2 South (10th)
- Ravens - transferred from Eastern Counties 3 South (champions)
- Runwell Wyverns - transferred from Eastern Counties 3 South (runners up)
- South Woodham Ferrers - transferred from Eastern Counties 2 South (6th)
- Thames - transferred from Eastern Counties 2 South - transferred from Eastern Counties 2 South (9th)

== Essex 2 honours ==
=== Essex 2 (2003–2009) ===
The original Essex 2 was a tier 9 league with promotion up to Essex 1 and relegation down to Essex 3.

Essex 2
Season	No of Teams	Champions	Runners–up	Relegated Teams
2003–04	10	Thames	South Woodham Ferrers	Old Edwardians, Runwell Wyverns
2004–05	9	Canvey Island	Bancroft	Ravens
2005–06	9	Writtle Wanderers	Dagenham	Stanford Le Hope
2006–07	9	Millwall	Old Brentwoods	May & Baker
2007–08	8	Clacton	Thames	Witham, Pegasus Palmerians
2008–09	8	Millwall	Old Cooperians	No relegation (Note: There was no relegation as Essex 3 was cancelled the following season.)
Green backgrounds are promotion places.

=== Essex 2 (2009–2014) ===
Essex 2 remained a tier 10 league despite national restructuring by the RFU. Promotion was to Essex 1 and there was no relegation since the cancellation of Essex 3 at the end of the 2008–09 season. Essex 2 was itself disbanded at the end of the 2013–14 season with all teams either promoted to Essex 1 or transferred to the Essex Merit Leagues.

Essex 2
Season	No of Teams	Champions	Runners–up	Relegated Teams
2009–10	11	Pegasus Palmerians	Brightlingsea	No relegation
2010–11	9	Epping Upper Clapton	Writtle Wanderers	No relegation
2011–12	9	Dagenham	Burnham-On-Crouch	No relegation
2012–13	9	Writtle Wanderers	Ilford Wanderers	No relegation
2013–14	9	May & Baker	Millwall (Note: 3rd place Pegasus Palmerians also promoted.)	No relegation
Green backgrounds are promotion places.

== Number of league titles ==
- Millwall (2)
- Writtle Wanderers (2)
- Canvey Island (1)
- Clacton (1)
- Dagenham (1)
- Epping Upper Clapton (1)
- May & Baker (1)
- Pegasus Palmerians (1)
- Thames (1)

== See also ==
- London & SE Division RFU
- Essex RFU
- English rugby union system
- Rugby union in England
