= London 2 North East =

English level 7 Rugby Union League

Counties 1 Eastern Counties
- Current season or competition: 2025–26 Counties 1 Eastern Counties
- Sport: Rugby union
- Instituted: 1987; 39 years ago 1987; 39 years ago (as London 3 North East)
- Number of teams: 12
- Country: England
- Holders: Norwich (2024–25)
- Most titles: Rochford Hundred (4 titles)
- Website: englandrugby.com

Counties 1 Eastern Counties (formerly London 2 North East) is an English level 7 Rugby Union League. When this division began in 1987 it was known as London 3 North East, changing to its current name ahead of the 2009–10 season. Following the RFU's Adult Competition Review, from season 2022–23 it adopted its current name Counties 1 Eastern Counties.

The current champions are Norwich.

== Format ==
The champions are promoted to Regional 2 Anglia. The number of teams relegated depends on feedback following promotion and relegation in the leagues above, but is usually to Counties 2 Eastern Counties.

The season runs from September to April and comprises twenty-two rounds of matches, with each club playing each of its rivals, home and away. The results of the matches contribute points to the league as follows:

- 4 points are awarded for a win
- 2 points are awarded for a draw
- 0 points are awarded for a loss, however
- 1 losing (bonus) point is awarded to a team that loses a match by 7 points or fewer
- 1 additional (bonus) point is awarded to a team scoring 4 tries or more in a match.

== 2026-27 ==
Departing were Bury St Edmunds II promoted to Regional 2 Anglia while Ely (10th), Ipswich (11th) and North Walsham II (12th) were relegated to Counties 2 Eastern Counties.

Team	Ground	Capacity	City/Area	Previous season
Cantabrigian	Sedley Taylor Road		Cambridge, Cambridgeshire	Promoted from Counties 2 Eastern Counties (champions)
Colchester II	Raven Park		Colchester, Essex	9th
Holt	Bridge Road		Holt, Norfolk	Relegated from Regional 2 Anglia (12th)
Ipswich	Humber Doucy Lane		Ipswich, Suffolk	7th
Newmarket	Scaltback Pavilion		Newmarket, Suffolk	8th
Norwich	Beeston Hyrne		Norwich, Norfolk	Relegated from Regional 2 Anglia (11th)
Saffron Walden	Chickney Road		Henham, Essex	3rd
Shelford II	The Davey Field	2,000 (150 seats)	Great Shelford, Cambridgeshire	6th
Southwold	The Common		Southwold, Suffolk	4th
Stowmarket	Chilton Fields		Stowmarket, Suffolk	2nd
West Norfolk	Gatehouse Lane		North Wootton, King's Lynn, Norfolk	5th
Woodbridge	Hatchley Barn		Woodbridge, Suffolk	Promoted from Counties 2 Eastern Counties (champions)

Locations of the 2026-27 Counties 1 Eastern Counties teams

== 2025–26 ==
=== Participating clubs and locations ===
Departing were Norwich promoted to Regional 2 Anglia while Cantabrigian (12th) and Diss (11th) were relegated to Counties 2 Eastern Counties.

Team	Ground	Capacity	City/Area	Previous season
Bury St Edmunds II	The Haberden	3,000 (135 seats)	Bury St Edmunds, Suffolk	9th
Colchester II	Raven Park		Colchester, Essex	10th
Ely	Cambridge Commodities Park		Ely, Cambridgeshire	7th
Ipswich	Humber Doucy Lane		Ipswich, Suffolk	4th
Ipswich Y.M.	The Street		Ipswich, Suffolk	Promoted from Counties 2 Eastern Counties (2nd)
Newmarket	Scaltback Pavilion		Newmarket, Suffolk	2nd
North Walsham II	Norwich Road	1,600	Scottow, Norfolk	8th
Saffron Walden	Chickney Road		Henham, Essex	5th
Shelford II	The Davey Field	2,000 (150 seats)	Great Shelford, Cambridgeshire	6th
Southwold	The Common		Southwold, Suffolk	3rd
Stowmarket	Chilton Fields		Stowmarket, Suffolk	Relegated from Regional 2 Anglia (12th)
West Norfolk	Gatehouse Lane		North Wootton, King's Lynn, Norfolk	Promoted from Counties 2 Eastern Counties (champions)

Locations of the 2025–26 Counties 1 Eastern Counties teams

== 2024–25 ==
=== Participating clubs and locations ===
Departing were the champons Wymondham, promoted to Regional 2 Anglia while Ipswich Y.M. (10th), West Norfolk (11th) and Wisbech (12th) were relegated to Counties 2 Eastern Counties. Joining were Saffron Walden (11th) and Norwich (12th) both relegated from Regional 2 Anglia, while the champions Colchester II and the runner-up Newmarket were both promoted from Counties 2 Eastern Counties.

Team	Ground	Capacity	City/Area	Previous season
Bury St Edmunds II	The Haberden	3,000 (135 seats)	Bury St Edmunds, Suffolk	3rd
Cantabrigian	Sedley Taylor Road		Cambridge, Cambridgeshire	7th
Colchester II	Raven Park		Colchester, Essex	Promoted from Counties 2 Eastern Counties (champions)
Diss	Mackenders		Roydon, Norfolk	8th
Ely	Cambridge Commodities Park		Ely, Cambridgeshire	6th
Ipswich	Humber Doucy Lane		Ipswich, Suffolk	2nd
Newmarket	Scaltback Pavilion		Newmarket, Suffolk	Promoted from Counties 2 Eastern Counties (2nd)
North Walsham II	Norwich Road	1,600	Scottow, Norfolk	9th
Norwich	Beeston Hyrne		Norwich, Norfolk	Relegated from Regional 2 Anglia (12th)
Saffron Walden	Chickney Road		Henham, Essex	Relegated from Regional 2 Anglia (11th)
Shelford II	The Davey Field	2,000 (150 seats)	Great Shelford, Cambridgeshire	4th
Southwold	The Common		Southwold, Suffolk	5th

Locations of the 2024–25 Counties 1 Eastern Counties teams

=== League table ===
Counties 1 Eastern Counties 2024–25
	Team	Played	Won	Drawn	Lost	Points for	Points against	Points diff	Try bonus	Loss bonus	Points
1	Norwich (P)	22	22	0	0	1038	351	687	21	0	109
2	Newmarket	22	15	2	5	668	515	153	13	2	79
3	Southwold	22	15	1	6	742	491	251	13	2	77
4	Ipswich	22	13	0	9	748	511	237	15	4	71
5	Saffron Walden	22	10	0	12	539	608	−69	10	7	57
6	Shelford II	22	10	0	12	530	694	−164	9	5	54
7	Ely	22	9	0	13	535	689	−154	11	5	52
8	North Walsham II	22	9	1	12	461	632	−171	11	2	51
9	Bury St Edmunds II	22	8	0	14	604	629	−25	12	7	51
10	Colchester II	22	7	0	15	644	689	−45	16	6	50
11	Diss (R)	22	6	0	16	418	617	−199	6	7	37
12	Cantabrigian (R)	22	6	0	16	404	905	−501	8	3	35
If teams are level at any stage, tiebreakers are applied in the following order: 1. Number of matches won 2. Difference between points for and against 3. Total number of points for 4. Aggregate number of points scored in matches between tied teams 5. Number of matches won excluding the first match, then the second and so on until the tie is settled
Green background is the promotion place. Pink background are the relegation places Updated: 5 January 2026; Source:

== 2023–24 ==
=== Participating clubs and location ===
Departing were Saffron Walden and Holt, promoted to Regional 2 Anglia as champions and runner-up respectively, while Thurston (12th) was relegated to Counties 2 Eastern Counties.

Team	Ground	Capacity	City/Area	Previous season
Bury St Edmunds II	The Haberden	3,000 (135 seats)	Bury St Edmunds, Suffolk	8th
Cantabrigian	Sedley Taylor Road		Cambridge, Cambridgeshire	7th
Diss	Mackenders		Roydon, Norfolk	11th
Ely	Cambridge Commodities Park		Ely, Cambridgeshire	5th
Ipswich	Humber Doucy Lane		Ipswich, Suffolk	Relegated from Regional 2 Anglia (11th)
Ipswich Y.M.	The Street		Ipswich, Suffolk	9th
North Walsham II	Norwich Road	1,600	Scottow, Norfolk	Promoted from Counties 2 Eastern Counties (2nd)
Shelford II	The Davey Field	2,000 (150 seats)	Great Shelford, Cambridgeshire	4th
Southwold	The Common		Southwold, Suffolk	6th
West Norfolk	Gatehouse Lane		North Wootton, King's Lynn, Norfolk	10th
Wisbech	Chapel Road		Wisbech, Cambridgeshire	Promoted from Counties 2 Eastern Counties (champions)
Wymondham	The Foster Harrison Memorial Ground		Wymondham, Norfolk	3rd

Locations of the 2023–24 Counties 1 Eastern Counties teams

=== League table ===
Counties 1 Eastern Counties 2023–24
	Team	Played	Won	Drawn	Lost	Points for	Points against	Points diff	Try bonus	Loss bonus	Points	Points deducted
1	Wymondham (P)	22	19	0	3	797	338	459	13	2	91	
2	Ipswich	22	16	0	6	625	392	233	15	4	85	+2
3	Bury St Edmunds II	22	16	0	6	799	455	344	15	2	81	
4	Shelford II	22	16	0	6	638	468	170	16	0	81	+1
5	Southwold	22	14	0	8	585	410	175	12	4	73	+1
6	Ely	22	14	0	8	705	369	336	12	2	65	+5
7	Cantabrigian	22	11	0	11	688	724	−36	12	0	56	
8	Diss	22	8	0	14	349	683	−344	3	3	40	+2
9	North Walsham II	22	5	0	17	387	780	−393	6	1	27	
10	Ipswich Y M (R)	22	4	1	17	382	612	−230	5	3	27	+1
11	West Norfolk (R)	22	6	0	16	285	697	−412	4	2	25	−5
12	Wisbech (R)	22	2	1	19	318	630	−312	5	3	8	−10
If teams are level at any stage, tiebreakers are applied in the following order: 1. Number of matches won 2. Difference between points for and against 3. Total number of points for 4. Aggregate number of points scored in matches between tied teams 5. Number of matches won excluding the first match, then the second and so on until the tie is settled
Green background is the promotion place. Pink background are the relegation places Updated: 4 January 2026; Source:

== 2022–23 ==
=== Participating clubs and location ===
This was the first season following the RFU Adult Competition Review with the league adopting its new name of Counties 1 Eastern Counties. Six teams returned and the league was supplemented with the top four teams from London 3 Eastern Counties and two reserve sides. Essex and London teams transferred to Counties 1 Essex or were promoted to Regional 2 Anglia.

Team	Ground	Capacity	City/Area	Previous season
Bury St Edmunds II	The Haberden	3,000 (135 seats)	Bury St Edmunds, Suffolk	Raging Bull Shield Div 2 (3rd)
Cantabrigian	Sedley Taylor Road		Cambridge, Cambridgeshire	5th
Diss	Mackenders		Roydon, Norfolk	10th
Ely	Cambridge Commodities Park		Ely, Cambridgeshire	L3EC (2nd)
Holt	Bridge Road		Holt, Norfolk	L3EC (1st)
Ipswich Y.M.	The Street		Ipswich, Suffolk	L3EC (3rd)
Saffron Walden	Chickney Road		Henham, Essex	7th
Shelford II	The Davey Field	2,000 (150 seats)	Great Shelford, Cambridgeshire	Essex Merit League Div 1 (2nd)
Southwold	The Common		Southwold, Suffolk	9th
Thurston	Robinson Field		Thurston, Suffolk	L3EC (4th)
West Norfolk	Gatehouse Lane		North Wootton, King's Lynn, Norfolk	11th
Wymondham	The Foster Harrison Memorial Ground		Wymondham, Norfolk	6th

Locations of the 2022–23 Counties 1 Eastern Counties teams

=== League table ===
Counties 1 Eastern Counties 2022–23
	Team	Played	Won	Drawn	Lost	Points for	Points against	Points diff	Try bonus	Loss bonus	Points	Points deducted
1	Saffron Walden (P)	22	22	0	0	831	239	592	17	0	106	+1
2	Holt (P)	22	18	0	4	771	508	263	17	0	90	+1
3	Wymondham	22	13	1	8	554	413	141	11	5	70	
4	Shelford II	22	12	1	9	657	581	76	10	1	61	
5	Ely	22	12	0	10	574	504	70	9	2	59	
6	Southwold	22	10	1	11	487	505	−18	7	4	54	+1
7	Cantabrigian	22	9	1	12	493	719	−226	11	0	49	
8	Bury St Edmunds II	22	9	1	12	545	485	60	9	3	45	−5
9	Ipswich Y M	22	6	2	14	400	597	−197	7	7	42	
10	West Norfold	22	7	0	15	448	730	−282	10	2	41	−1
11	Diss	22	5	0	17	505	755	−250	10	4	34	
12	Thurston (R)	22	5	1	16	370	599	−229	3	4	29	
If teams are level at any stage, tiebreakers are applied in the following order: 1. Number of matches won 2. Difference between points for and against 3. Total number of points for 4. Aggregate number of points scored in matches between tied teams 5. Number of matches won excluding the first match, then the second and so on until the tie is settled
Green background is the promotion place. Pink background are the relegation places Updated: 3 January 2026; Source:

== Teams for 2021–22 ==
The teams competing in 2021-22 achieved their places in the league based on performances in 2019–20, the 'previous season' column in the table below refers to that season not 2020–21.

Team	Ground	Capacity	City/Area	Previous season
Cantabrigian	Sedley Taylor Road		Cambridge, Cambridgeshire	Promoted from London 3 EC (runners-up)
Chelmsford	Coronation Park		Chelmsford, Essex	Promoted from London 3 Essex (champions)
Diss	Mackenders		Roydon, Norfolk	5th
Ipswich	Humber Doucy Lane		Ipswich, Suffolk	3rd
Saffron Walden	Chickney Road		Henham, Essex	7th
South Woodham Ferrers	Saltcoats Playing Field		South Woodham Ferrers, Essex	8th
Southwold	The Common		Southwold, Suffolk	2nd
Stowmarket	Chilton Fields		Stowmarket, Suffolk	6th
Wanstead	Centenary Fields		Wanstead, London	9th
West Norfolk	Gatehouse Lane		North Wootton, King's Lynn, Norfolk	Promoted from London 3 EC (champions)
Woodford	Highams		Woodford, London	Relegated from London 1 North (14th)
Wymondham	The Foster Harrison Memorial Ground		Wymondham, Norfolk	4th

Locations of the 2021–22 London 2 North East teams

== Season 2020–21 ==
On 30 October the RFU announced that a decision had been taken to cancel Adult Competitive Leagues (National League 1 and below) for the 2020/21 season meaning London 2 North East was not contested.

== Teams for 2019–20 ==
Team	Ground	Capacity	City/Area	Previous season
Diss	Mackenders		Roydon, Norfolk	Relegated from London 1 North (14th)
Epping Upper Clapton	Upland Road		Thornwood, Epping, Essex	Promoted from London 3 Essex (champions)
Holt	Bridge Road		Holt, Norfolk	Promoted from London 3 EC (playoff)
Ipswich	Humber Doucy Lane		Ipswich, Suffolk	7th
Norwich	Beeston Hyrne		Norwich, Norfolk	4th
Romford & Gidea Park	Crowlands		Romford, London	Runners up (lost playoff)
Saffron Walden	Chickney Road		Henham, Essex	5th
South Woodham Ferrers	Saltcoats Playing Field		South Woodham Ferrers, Essex	9th
Southwold	The Common		Southwold, Suffolk	8th
Stowmarket	Chilton Fields		Stowmarket, Suffolk	3rd
Wanstead	Centenary Fields		Wanstead, London	6th
Wymondham	The Foster Harrison Memorial Ground		Wymondham, Norfolk	Promoted from London 3 EC (champions)

Locations of the 2019–20 London 2 North East teams

== Teams for 2018–19 ==
Team	Ground	Capacity	City/Area	Previous season
Basildon	Gardiners Close		Basildon, Essex	Promoted from London 3 Essex (champions)
Cantabrigian	Sedley Taylor Road		Cambridge, Cambridgeshire	8th
Harlow	Latton Park		Harlow, Essex	5th
Ipswich	Humber Doucy Lane		Ipswich, Suffolk	6th
Norwich	Beeston Hyrne		Norwich, Norfolk	3rd
Romford & Gidea Park	Crowlands		Romford, London	7th
Saffron Walden	Chickney Road		Henham, Essex	Relegated from London 1 North (12th)
South Woodham Ferrers	Saltcoats Playing Field		South Woodham Ferrers, Essex	Relegated from London 1 North (14th)
Southwold	The Common		Southwold, Suffolk	Promoted from London 3 EC (playoff)
Stowmarket	Chilton Fields		Stowmarket, Suffolk	Promoted from London 3 EC (champions)
Wanstead	Roding Lane North		Wanstead, London	4th
Woodford	Highams		Woodford, London	9th

Locations of the 2018–19 London 2 North East teams
Location of 2018–19 London 2 North East clubs in London

== Teams for 2017–18 ==
Team	Ground	Capacity	City/Area	Previous season
Cantabrigian	Sedley Taylor Road		Cambridge, Cambridgeshire	3rd
Chelmsford	Coronation Park		Chelmsford, Essex	Relegated from London 1 North (13th)
Epping Upper Clapton	Upland Road		Thornwood, Epping, Essex	5th
Harlow	Latton Park		Harlow, Essex	Promoted from London 3 North East (champions)
Ipswich	Humber Doucy Lane		Ipswich, Suffolk	10th
Norwich	Beeston Hyrne		Norwich, Norfolk	9th
Old Cooperians	Coopers' Company & Corborn School		Upminster, London	6th
Rochford Hundred	The Rugby Park	1,000	Hawkwell, Rochford, Essex	8th
Romford & Gidea Park	Crowlands		Romford, London	4th
Sudbury	Whittome Field		Great Cornard, Sudbury, Suffolk	Relegated from London 1 North (12th)
Wanstead	Roding Lane North		Wanstead, London	Promoted from London 3 North East (runners up)
Woodford	Highams		Woodford, London	7th

Locations of the 2017–18 London 2 North East teams
Location of 2017–18 London 2 North East clubs in London

== Teams for 2016–17 ==
- Campion
- Cantabrigian
- Diss
- Epping Upper Clapton (promoted from London 3 North East)
- Holt
- Ipswich
- Norwich
- Old Cooperians (promoted from London 3 North East)
- Rochford Hundred
- Romford & Gidea Park
- South Woodham Ferrers
- Woodford (transferred from London 2 North West)

== Teams for 2015–16 ==
- Basildon
- Campion
- Cantabrigian (promoted from London 3 North East)
- Diss
- Holt
- Ipswich (relegated from London 1 North)
- Norwich
- Rochford Hundred
- Romford & Gidea Park (relegated from London 1 North)
- Saffron Walden
- South Woodham Ferrers
- Sudbury (promoted from London 3 North East)

== Teams for 2014–15 ==
- Basildon
- Braintree
- Campion (promoted from London 3 North East)
- Chelmsford
- Diss (relegated from London 1 North)
- Enfield Ignatians
- Holt
- Norwich
- Old Cooperians (promoted from London 3 North East)
- Rochford Hundred
- Saffron Walden
- South Woodham Ferrers

== Teams for 2013–14 ==
- Basildon (relegated from London 1 North)
- Braintree
- Chelmsford
- Enfield Ignatians
- Holt
- Ipswich
- Lowestoft & Yarmouth
- Norwich (promoted from London 3 North East)
- Rochford Hundred
- Saffron Walden
- South Woodham Ferrers
- Stowmarket

== Teams for 2012–13 ==
- Braintree
- Chelmsford
- Enfield Ignatians
- Holt
- Ipswich
- Lowestoft & Yarmouth
- North Walsham
- Old Streetonians
- Saffron Walden
- Stevenage Town
- Stowmarket
- Woodford

== Teams for 2009–10 ==
- Beccles
- Braintree
- Canvey Island
- Chelmsford
- Enfield Ignatians
- Harlow
- Ipswich
- Old Streetonians
- Rochford Hundred
- Romford & Gidea Park
- Saffron Walden
- Sudbury

== Original teams ==
When league rugby began in 1987 this division (known as London 3 North East) contained the following teams:

- Barking
- Brentwood
- Bury St Edmunds
- Chingford
- Colchester
- Eton Manor
- Ipswich YMCA
- Old Cantabrigian (Note: Currently known as Cantabrigian RUFC.)
- Old Westcliffians (Note: Currently known as Westcliff RFC.)
- Saffron Walden

== London 2 North East honours ==
=== London 3 North East (1987–1993) ===
Originally known as London 3 North East, this division was a tier 7 league with promotion to London 2 North and relegation to Eastern Counties 1.

London 3 North East
Season	No of teams	Champions	Runners–up	Relegated teams
1987–88	11	Barking	Eton Manor	Bury St Edmunds
1988–89	11	Eton Manor	Chingford	Ipswich YMCA
1989–90	11	Chingford	Harlow	Metropolitan Police (Chigwell)
1990–91	11	Harlow	Romford & Gidea Park	West Norfolk
1991–92	11	Cambridge	Old Edwardians	No relegation
1992–93	13	Brentwood	Rochford Hundred	Old Cantabrigian, Canvey Island
Green backgrounds are promotion places.

=== London 3 North East (1993–1996) ===
At the end of the 1992–93 season, the top six teams from London 1 and the top six from South West 1 were combined to create National 5 South. This meant that London 3 North East dropped from a tier 7 league to a tier 8 league for the years that National 5 South was active. Promotion and relegation continued to London 2 North and Eastern Counties 1 respectively.

London 3 North East
Season	No of teams	Champions	Runners-up	Relegated teams
1993–94	13	Romford & Gidea Park	Ipswich	Saffron Walden, Westcliff
1994–95	13	Colchester	Rochford Hundred	Woodbridge, Basildon
1995–96	13	Ipswich	Lowestoft & Yarmouth	Shelford, Campion
Green backgrounds are promotion places.

=== London 3 North East (1996–2000) ===
The cancellation of National 5 South at the end of the 1995–96 season meant that London 3 North East reverted to being a tier 7 league. Promotion and relegation continued to London 2 North and Eastern Counties 1 respectively.

London 3 North East
Season	No of teams	Champions	Runners-up	Relegated teams	Ref
1996–97	13	Diss	Chingford (Note: 3rd place Braintree also promoted.)	No relegation (Note: No relegation as league was set to expand from 13 to 17 teams for the following season.)	
1997–98	17	Lowestoft & Yarmouth	Bury St Edmunds	Upminster	
1998–99	17	Chelmsford	Shelford	Bancroft, Old Edwardians and Woodbridge	
1999–00	17	Rochford Hundred	Basildon	Multiple teams (Note: The creation of London 4 North East for the following season meant that eleven teams were relegated. Maldon, Colchester and Eton Manor dropped two divisions to Eastern Counties 1, while Newmarket, Holt, Ely, West Norfolk, Hadleigh, Canvey Island, Bury St Edmunds and Thetford went into the new London 4 North East division.)	
Green backgrounds are promotion places.

=== London 3 North East (2000–2009) ===
London 3 North East continued to be a tier 7 league with promotion to London 2 North. However, the introduction of London 4 North East ahead of the 2000–01 season meant that clubs were now relegated into this new division instead of into Eastern Counties 1.

London 3 North East
Season	No of teams	Champions	Runners-up	Relegated teams	Ref
2000–01	10	Southend	Rochford Hundred	Lowestoft & Yarmouth, Braintree and Campion	
2001–02	10	Shelford	Basildon	Chelmsford	
2002–03	10	Romford & Gidea Park	Saffron Walden	Basildon, Wymondham, West Norfolk and Rochford Hundred	
2003–04	10	Shelford	Hadleigh	No relegation (Note: Due to league restructure from 10 to 12 teams for the 2004–05 season there was no relegation.)	
2004–05	12	Chingford	Romford & Gidea Park	Braintree, Chelmsford	
2005–06	12	Eton Manor	Diss	Sudbury, Saffron Walden	
2006–07	12	Bury St Edmunds	Harlow	Campion	
2007–08	12	Westcliff	Diss	Colchester, Ipswich	
2008–09	12	Rochford Hundred	Brentwood	No relegation (Note: There was no relegation this year as the division was renamed London Division 2 North East for the 2009–10 season and along with the whole national restructure of the league system by the RFU lead to mass changes at all levels.)	
Green backgrounds are promotion places.

=== London 2 North East (2009–2017) ===
Nationwide league restructuring by the RFU ahead of the 2009–10 season saw London 3 North East renamed as London 2 North East. It remained at level 7 with promotion to London 1 North (formerly London 2 North) and relegation to London 3 North East (formerly London 4 North East).

London 2 North East
Season	No of teams	Champions	Runners-up	Relegated teams	Ref
2009–10	12	Thurrock	Colchester	Mersea Island and Norwich	
2010–11	12	Rochford Hundred	Braintree	Harlow and Sudbury	
2011–12	12	Romford & Gidea Park	Basildon	Canvey Island and Beccles	
2012–13	12	North Walsham	Woodford	Stevenage Town and Old Streetonians	
2013–14	12	Ipswich	Saffron Walden	Lowestoft & Yarmouth and Stowmarket	
2014–15	11	Chelmsford	Diss	Old Cooperians (Note: Only one team went down this season due to league returning to 12 teams for the following season.)	
2015–16	12	Saffron Walden	Sudbury	Basildon (Note: Only one team went down this season as 11th placed Campion were given a reprieve due to East Grinstead dropping out of National League 3 London & SE due to financial difficulties.)	
2016–17	12	Diss	South Woodham Ferrers	Campion and Holt	
Green backgrounds are promotion places.

=== London 2 North East (2017–present) ===
Further restructuring ahead of the 2017–18 season, which included the cancellation of London 3 North East and introduction of London 3 Eastern Counties or London 3 Essex, meant that relegation was now to either of these new leagues. Overwise, London 2 North East was unchanged, remaining as a tier 7 division with promotion continuing to London 1 North. Following league restructuring in 2022, four teams were promoted to Regional 2 Anglia.

London 2 North East
Season	No of teams	Champions	Runners-up	Relegated teams	Ref
2017–18	12	Rochford Hundred	Sudbury	Old Cooperians, Epping Upper Clapton, Chelmsford	
2018–19	12	Woodford	Romford & Gidea Park	Basildon, Harlow, Cantabrigian	
2019–20	12	Norwich	Southwold	Epping, Holt, Romford & Gidea Park	
2020–21	12	Cancelled due to the COVID-19 pandemic in the United Kingdom.			
2021–22	12	Woodford	Ipswich	Stowmarket (3rd) and Chelmsford (4th), (also promoted). South Woodham (12th) relegated to Counties 1 Essex.	
Green backgrounds are promotion places.

=== Counties 1 Eastern Counties (2022– ) ===
Following league reorganisation, London 2 North East is renamed Counties 1 Eastern Counties and continues to be a tier 7 league. Promotion is to Regional 2 Anglia and relegation to Counties 2 Eastern Counties

Counties 1 Eastern Counties
Season	No of teams	No of matches	Champions	Runners-up	Relegated team(s)	Ref
2022–23	12	22	Saffron Walden	Holt	Thurston (12th)	
2023–24	12	22	Wymondham	Ipswich	Ipswich Y M (10th), West Norfolk (11th) and Wisbech (12th)	
2024–25	12	22	Norwich	Newmarket	Diss (11th) and Cantabrigian (12th)	
Green background is the promotion place.

== Promotion play-offs ==
Since the 2000–01 season there has been a play-off between the runners-up of London 2 North East and London 2 North West for the third and final promotion place to London 1 North. The team with the superior league record has home advantage in the tie. At the end of the 2018–19 season, the London 2 North East teams had ten wins to London 2 North West nine, and the home team won promotion on thirteen occasions compared to the away teams six.

London 2 (north-east v north-west) promotion play-off results
Season	Home team	Score	Away team	Venue	Att/Ref
2000–01	Twickenham (NW)	44–8	Rochford Hundred (NE)	Parkfields, Hampton, Greater London	
2001–02	Letchworth Garden City (NW)	31–22	Basildon (NE)	Baldock Road, Letchworth Garden City, Hertfordshire	
2002–03	Ealing Trailfinders (NW)	36–12	Saffron Walden (NE)	Trailfinders Sports Ground, Ealing, London	
2003–04	St Albans (2nd XV) (NW)	5–22	Hadleigh (NE)	Oaklands Land, St Albans, Hertfordshire	
2004–05	Bank of England (NW)	39–0	Romford and Gidea Park (NE)	Bank Lane, Roehampton, Greater London	
2005–06	Tring (NW)	19–5	Diss (NE)	Cow Lane, Tring, Hertfordshire	
2006–07	Welwyn (NW)	19–6	Harlow (NE)	Hobbs Way, Welwyn Garden City, Hertfordshire	
2007–08	Diss (NE)	50–15	Imperial Medicals (NW)	Mackenders, Roydon, Norfolk	
2008–09	Brentwood (NE)	23–15	Hampstead (NW)	King George's Playing Fields, Brentwood, Essex	
2009–10	Hammersmith & Fulham (NW)	22–29	Colchester (NE)	Hurlingham Park, Fulham, London	
2010–11	Braintree (NE)	24–14	Harpenden (NW)	Robbs Wood, Braintree, Essex	300
2011–12	Basildon (NE)	38–13	Stevenage (NW)	Gardiners Close, Basildon, Essex	
2012–13	Hemel Hempstead (NW)	13–16 (aet)	Woodford (NE)	Chaulden Lane, Hemel Hempstead, Hertfordshire	500
2013–14	Twickenham (NW)	44–43	Saffron Walden (NE)	Parkfields, Hampton, Greater London	
2014–15	Diss (NE)	13–16	Chiswick (NW)	Mackenders, Roydon, Norfolk	
2015–16	Sudbury (NE)	22–18	Hammersmith & Fulham (NW)	Whittham Field, Sudbury, Suffolk	
2016–17	H.A.C. (NW)	48–7 (Note: The initial result of the 2016–17 play-off was overturned by the RFU after HAC were found guilty of fielding an ineligible player. South Woodham Ferrers were promoted instead.)	South Woodham Ferrers (NE)	Artillery Ground, Finsbury, London	
2017–18	Hampstead (NW)	7–37	Sudbury (NE)	Parliament Hill Fields, Highgate, Camden, London	
2018–19	Harpenden (NW)	60–6	Romford and Gidea Park (NE)	Redbourn Lane, Harpenden, Hertfordshire	
2019–20	Cancelled due to COVID-19 pandemic in the United Kingdom. Best ranked runner-up – Hammersmith & Fulham (NW) – promoted.				
2020–21	No play-off due to league reorganisation				
Green background is the promoted team.(NE) = London 2 North East (formerly London 3 North East) and (NW) = London 2 North West (formerly London 3 North West)

== Number of league titles ==
- Rochford Hundred (4)
- Romford & Gidea Park (3)
- Chingford (2)
- Chelmsford (2)
- Diss (2)
- Eton Manor (2)
- Ipswich (2)
- Norwich (2)
- Saffron Walden (2)
- Shelford (2)
- Woodford (2)
- Barking (1)
- Brentwood (1)
- Bury St Edmunds (1)
- Cambridge (1)
- Colchester (1)
- Harlow (1)
- Lowestoft & Yarmouth (1)
- North Walsham (1)
- Southend (1)
- Thurrock (1)
- Westcliff (1)
- Wymondham (1)
- (Updated to 2025)

== See also ==
- London & SE Division RFU
- Eastern Counties RFU
- Essex RFU
- English rugby union system
- Rugby union in England
