= Regional 2 Anglia =

English Rugby Union Regional League

- Current season or competition: 2026–27 Regional 2 Anglia
- Sport: Rugby union
- Instituted: 2022; 4 years ago
- Number of teams: 12
- Country: England
- Holders: Eton Manor (1st title) (2025–26)
- Most titles: Letchworth Garden City, Southend Saxons, Westcliff, Eton Manor (1 title)

Regional 2 Anglia is an English level 6 rugby union regional league for rugby clubs in London and the south-east of England including sides from Essex, Greater London, Hertfordshire, Norfolk and Suffolk. It was created as a product of 2022 Adult Competition Review. Eton Manor are the current champions.

== Structure and format ==
The twelve teams play home and away matches from September through to April, making a total of twenty-two matches each. The results of the matches contribute points to the league as follows:

- 4 points are awarded for a win
- 2 points are awarded for a draw
- 0 points are awarded for a loss, however
- 1 losing (bonus) point is awarded to a team that loses a match by 7 points or fewer
- 1 additional (bonus) point is awarded to a team scoring 4 tries or more in a match

There is one automatic promotion place and two relegation places. The first-placed team at the end of season wins promotion to Regional 1 South East. The last three placed clubs are usually relegated to either Counties 1 Eastern Counties, Counties 1 Essex or Counties 1 Herts/Middlesex depending on location.

== 2026–27 ==
=== Participating teams and locations ===
Departing were the champions Eton Manor, promoted to Regional 1 South East, while Norwich (11th) and Holt (12th) were relegated to Counties 1 Eastern Counties. Also departing were HAC (Honourable Artillery Company) (runners-up) on a level transfer to Regional 2 Thames.

Team	Ground	Capacity	City/Area	Previous season
Braintree	Robbswood		Braintree, Essex	10th
Brentwood	King George's Playing Fields	3,000	Brentwood, Essex	3rd
Bury St Edmunds II	The Haberden	3,000 (135 seats)	Bury St Edmunds, Suffolk	Promoted from Counties 1EC (champions)
Chelmsford	Coronation Park		Chelmsford, Essex	9th
Cheshunt	Rosedale Sports Club		Cheshunt, Hertfordshire, Hertfordshire	Promoted from Counties 1 Hertfordshire (champions)
Finchley	Summers Lane	1,000	Finchley, London	Promoted from Counties 1 Middlesex (2nd)
Harlow	Latton Park		Harlow, Essex	6th
Rochford Hundred	The Rugby Park	1,000	Hawkwell, Rochford, Essex	7th
Thurrock	Oakfield		Grays, Essex	Promoted from Counties 1 Essex (champions)
Wanstead	Centenary Fields		Wanstead, London	5th
Woodford	Highams		Woodford, London	8th
Wymondham	The Foster Harrison Memorial Ground		Wymondham, Norfolk	4th

Locations of the 2026–27 Regional 2 Anglia teams in Essex, Suffolk & Norfolk
Location of 2026–27 Regional 2 Anglia teams in London

== 2025–26 ==
=== Participating teams and locations ===
Departing were the champions Westcliff, promoted to Regional 1 South East, while Stowmarket was relegated to Counties 1 Eastern Counties. Braintree and Norwich are promoted from Counties 1 Essex and Counties 1 Eastern Counties respectively. HAC (Honourable Artillery Company) were level transferred from Regional 2 Thames, restoring the league to twelve clubs.

Team	Ground	Capacity	City/Area	Previous season
Braintree	Robbswood		Braintree, Essex	Promoted from Counties 1 Essex (champions)
Brentwood	King George's Playing Fields	3,000	Brentwood, Essex	3rd
Chelmsford	Coronation Park		Chelmsford, Essex	7th
Eton Manor	The New Wilderness		Wanstead, London	2nd
H.A.C.	Artillery Ground		Finsbury, London	Level transfer from Regional 2 Thames (2nd)
Harlow	Latton Park		Harlow, Essex	4th
Holt	Bridge Road		Holt, Norfolk	10th
Norwich	Beeston Hyrne		Norwich, Norfolk	Promoted from Counties 1EC (champions)
Rochford Hundred	The Rugby Park	1,000	Hawkwell, Rochford, Essex	8th
Wanstead	Centenary Fields		Wanstead, London	6th
Woodford	Highams		Woodford, London	9th
Wymondham	The Foster Harrison Memorial Ground		Wymondham, Norfolk	5th

Locations of the 2025–26 Regional 2 Anglia teams in Essex, Suffolk & Norfolk
Location of 2025–26 Regional 2 Anglia teams in London

=== Final league table ===
Regional 2 Anglia 2025–26
	Team	Played	Won	Drawn	Lost	Points for	Points against	Points diff	Try bonus	Loss bonus	Points	Points deducted
1	Eton Manor (P)	22	20	0	2	1006	453	553	20	2	102	
2	H.A.C.	22	20	0	2	902	400	502	19	1	100	
3	Brentwood	22	16	1	5	891	454	437	18	2	86	
4	Wymondham	22	14	0	8	743	542	201	17	3	76	
5	Wanstead	22	11	0	11	614	673	−59	13	2	59	
6	Harlow	22	10	0	12	595	678	−83	13	3	58	+2
7	Rochford Hundred	22	9	2	11	582	653	−71	13	4	57	
8	Woodford	22	9	1	12	629	711	−82	11	1	50	
9	Chelmsford	22	8	0	14	555	689	−134	11	6	50	−1
10	Braintree	22	7	0	15	603	702	−99	10	4	42	
11	Norwich (R)	22	6	0	16	513	934	−421	9	3	36	
12	Holt (R)	22	0	0	22	322	1066	−744	5	1	−4	−10
If teams are level at any stage, tiebreakers are applied in the following order: 1. Number of matches won 2. Difference between points for and against 3. Total number of points for 4. Aggregate number of points scored in matches between tied teams 5. Number of matches won excluding the first match, then the second and so on until the tie is settled
Mint background is the promotion place (1st); Green background are the promotion play-off places (2nd–5th); Pink background are the relegation play-off places (10th–11th); Salmon background is the relegation place (12th); Updated: 16 June 2026; Source:

== 2024–25 ==
=== Participating teams and locations ===
Departing were Southend Saxons promoted to Regional 1 South East. Norwich and Saffron Walden were relegated to Counties 1 Eastern Counties. Joining the league were Wanstead from Counties 1 Essex, Wymondham promoted from Counties 1 Eastern Counties together with Rochford Hundred and Westcliff, both relegated from Regional 1 South East. Thurrock finished 4th in the previous season but were level transferred to Regional 2 South East for the new season.

Two weeks before the season started Dagenham, 9th in 2023–24, withdrew from the league citing ""...a combination of unforeseen circumstances within the club and a significant shortage of players..." and instead were placed in Division 2 of the Essex RFU merit leagues. Consequently, the league will be completed with eleven sides in 2024–25.

Team	Ground	Capacity	City/Area	Previous season
Brentwood	King George's Playing Fields	3,000	Brentwood, Essex	5th
Chelmsford	Coronation Park		Chelmsford, Essex	7th
Eton Manor	The New Wilderness		Wanstead, London	2nd
Harlow	Latton Park		Harlow, Essex	3rd
Holt	Bridge Road		Holt, Norfolk	8th
Rochford Hundred	The Rugby Park	1,000	Hawkwell, Rochford, Essex	Relegated from Regional 1SE (11th)
Stowmarket	Chilton Fields		Stowmarket, Suffolk	10th
Wanstead	Centenary Fields		Wanstead, London	Promoted from Counties 1 Essex (champions)
Westcliff	The Gables	1,000	Eastwood, Essex	Relegated from Regional 1SE (12th)
Woodford	Highams		Woodford, London	6th
Wymondham	The Foster Harrison Memorial Ground		Wymondham, Norfolk	Promoted from Counties 1EC (champions)

Locations of the 2024–25 Regional 2 Anglia teams in Essex, Suffolk & Norfolk
Location of 2024–25 Regional 2 Anglia teams in London

=== Final league table ===
Regional 2 Anglia 2024–25
	Team	Played	Won	Drawn	Lost	Points for	Points against	Points diff	Try bonus	Loss bonus	Points
1	Westcliff (P)	20	18	2	0	949	294	655	17	0	93
2	Eton Manor	20	15	1	4	877	392	485	16	2	80
3	Brentwood	20	14	0	6	591	442	149	12	2	70
4	Harlow	20	13	0	7	751	443	308	12	2	66
5	Wymondham	20	12	0	8	627	549	78	10	3	61
6	Wanstead	20	11	1	8	571	430	141	11	1	58
7	Chelmsford	20	8	0	12	615	668	−53	10	4	46
8	Rochford Hundred	20	7	0	13	481	825	−144	9	3	40
9	Woodford	20	8	0	12	446	680	−234	4	0	36
10	Holt	20	2	0	18	375	938	−563	5	1	14
11	Stowmarket (R)	20	0	0	20	289	1111	−822	5	1	6
If teams are level at any stage, tiebreakers are applied in the following order: 1. Number of matches won 2. Difference between points for and against 3. Total number of points for 4. Aggregate number of points scored in matches between tied teams 5. Number of matches won excluding the first match, then the second and so on until the tie is settled
Green background is the promotion place. Pink background are the relegation places Updated: 21 April 2025; Source:

== 2023–24 ==
=== Participating teams and locations ===
Departing were Chingford and Ipswich, relegated to Counties 1 Essex and Counties 1 Eastern Counties repspectively whilst Letchworth Garden City were promoted to Regional 1 South East. Joining were Holt and Saffron Walden, both promoted from Counties 1 Eastern Counties as were Harlow and Dagenham from Counties 1 Essex.

H.A.C. left on a level transfer to Regional 2 Thames.

Team	Ground	Capacity	City/Area	Previous season
Brentwood	King George's Playing Fields	3,000	Brentwood, Essex	5th
Chelmsford	Coronation Park		Chelmsford, Essex	10th
Dagenham	Central Park		Dagenham, London	Promoted from Counties 1 Essex (2nd)
Eton Manor	The New Wilderness		Wanstead, London	3rd
Harlow	Latton Park		Harlow, Essex	Promoted from Counties 1 Essex (champions)
Holt	Bridge Road		Holt, Norfolk	Promoted from Counties 1EC (2nd)
Norwich	Beeston Hyrne		Norwich, Norfolk	8th
Saffron Walden	Chickney Road		Henham, Essex	Promoted from Counties 1EC (champions)
Southend Saxons	Warners Park	1,500 (150 seats)	Southend-on-Sea, Essex	4th
Stowmarket	Chilton Fields		Stowmarket, Suffolk	9th
Thurrock	Oakfield		Grays, Essex	6th
Woodford	Highams		Woodford, London	7th

Locations of the 2023–24 Regional 2 Anglia teams in Essex, Suffolk & Norfolk
Location of 2023–24 Regional 2 Anglia teams in London

=== Final league table ===
Regional 2 Anglia 2023–24
	Team	Played	Won	Drawn	Lost	Points for	Points against	Points diff	Try bonus	Loss bonus	Points
1	Southend Saxons (P)	22	21	0	1	969	349	620	18	1	103
2	Eton Manor	22	18	0	4	1008	375	633	18	3	93
3	Harlow	22	18	0	4	875	486	389	16	2	90
4	Thurrock	22	14	0	8	701	544	157	13	1	70
5	Brentwood	22	12	0	10	655	537	118	13	6	67
6	Woodford	22	12	0	10	629	590	39	11	4	63
7	Chelmsford	22	7	1	14	492	802	−310	8	2	40
8	Holt	22	7	0	15	488	835	−347	9	1	38
9	Dagenham	22	6	0	16	558	748	−190	9	4	37
10	Stowmarket	22	6	1	15	418	809	−391	8	2	36
11	Saffron Walden (R)	22	6	0	16	473	850	−377	7	3	34
12	Norwich (R)	22	4	0	18	521	862	−341	10	5	31
If teams are level at any stage, tiebreakers are applied in the following order: 1. Number of matches won 2. Difference between points for and against 3. Total number of points for 4. Aggregate number of points scored in matches between tied teams 5. Number of matches won excluding the first match, then the second and so on until the tie is settled
Green background is the promotion place. Pink background are the relegation places Updated: 24 December 2024; Source:

== 2022–23 ==
=== Participating teams and locations ===
This was the first season following the RFU Adult Competition Review. The league had similarities to London 2 North East but was a level higher in the English rugby pyramid being at level 6 not 7. Some of the teams joining previously played in London 2 North West being Herts Rugby or Middlesex Rugby affiliated clubs.

Team	Ground	Capacity	City/Area	Previous season
Brentwood	King George's Playing Fields	3,000	Brentwood, Essex	7th London 1 North
Chelmsford	Coronation Park		Chelmsford, Essex	4th L2NE
Chingford	Lea Valley Playing Fields		Chingford, London	14th London 1 North
Eton Manor	The New Wilderness		Wanstead, London	6th London 1 North
H.A.C.	Artillery Ground		Finsbury, London	Champions L2NW
Ipswich	Humber Doucy Lane		Ipswich, Suffolk	2nd L2NE
Letchworth Garden City	Baldock Road		Letchworth, Hertfordshire	2nd L2NW
Norwich	Beeston Hyrne		Norwich, Norfolk	12th London 1 North
Southend Saxons	Warners Park	1,500 (150 seats)	Southend-on-Sea, Essex	5th London 1 North
Stowmarket	Chilton Fields		Stowmarket, Suffolk	3rd L2NE
Thurrock	Oakfield		Grays, Essex	11th London 1 North
Woodford	Highams		Woodford, London	Champions L2NE

Locations of the 2022–23 Regional 2 Anglia teams in Hertfordshire, Essex, Suffolk & Norfolk
Location of 2022–23 Regional 2 Anglia teams in London

=== Final league table ===
Regional 2 Anglia 2022–23
	Team	Played	Won	Drawn	Lost	Points for	Points against	Points diff	Try bonus	Loss bonus	Points	Points deducted
1	Letchworth Garden City (P)	22	21	1	0	712	339	373	14	0	101	
2	H.A.C.	22	17	1	4	578	285	293	12	4	87	
3	Eton Manor	22	16	1	5	973	292	681	15	4	85	
4	Southend Saxons	22	15	0	7	723	441	282	16	5	82	
5	Brentwood	22	15	1	6	571	452	119	11	1	75	
6	Thurrock	22	12	0	10	604	608	−4	14	2	65	
7	Woodford	22	7	0	15	487	688	−201	10	5	43	
8	Norwich	22	7	1	14	544	630	−86	9	3	42	
9	Stowmarket	22	7	1	14	433	696	−263	8	3	42	
10	Chelmsford	22	7	0	15	411	684	−273	9	3	41	
11	Ipswich (R)	22	4	0	18	318	793	−475	3	3	23	
12	Chingford (R)	22	1	0	21	134	580	−446	0	2	−19	−25
If teams are level at any stage, tiebreakers are applied in the following order: 1. Number of matches won 2. Difference between points for and against 3. Total number of points for 4. Aggregate number of points scored in matches between tied teams 5. Number of matches won excluding the first match, then the second and so on until the tie is settled
Green background is the promotion place. Pink background are the relegation places Updated: 23 December 2024; Source:

== Regional 2 Anglia honours ==
Regional 2 Anglia
Season	No of teams	No of matches	Champions	Runners-up	Relegated teams	Reference
2022–23	12	22	Letchworth Garden City	H.A.C.	Ipswich (11th) and Chingford (12th)	
2023–24	12	22	Southend Saxons	Eton Manor	Saffron Walden (11th) and Norwich (12th)	
2024–25	11 (Note: Due to Dagenham's withdrawal in August 2024, the league was only contested by eleven teams and subsequently only one team was relegated.)	20	Westcliff	Eton Manor	Stowmarket (11th)	
2025–26	12	20	Eton Manor	H.A.C.	Norwich (11th) and Holt (12th)	
Green background is the promotion place.

Team	Champions	Season	Runner-up	Season
Eton Manor	1	2025–26	2	2023–24, 2024–25
Letchworth Garden City	1	2022–23	–	–
Southend Saxons	1	2023–24	–	–
Westcliff	1	2024–25	–	–
H.A.C.	–	–	2	2022–23, 2025–26
