= TRFC =

TRFC may refer to:

== Association football (soccer) ==
- Tampines Rovers FC
- Tandragee Rovers F.C.
- Threave Rovers F.C.
- Tobermore United F.C.
- Tolka Rovers F.C.
- Tranmere Rovers F.C.
- Tullyvallen Rangers F.C.

== Rugby union ==
- Taunton R.F.C.
- Teignmouth R.F.C.
- Thurrock Rugby Football Club
- Tynedale R.F.C.
