= Counties 1 Essex =

English Rugby Union Regional League

- Current season or competition: 2025–26 Counties 1 Essex
- Sport: Rugby union
- Instituted: 2022; 4 years ago
- Number of teams: 12
- Country: England
- Holders: Braintree (2024–25)
- Website: Counties 1 Essex

Counties 1 Essex is an English level 7 rugby union regional league for rugby clubs in London and the south-east of England including sides from Essex and Greater London. Administration of the leagues is divided between Essex Rugby and the London & SE RFU.

Braintree are the current champions.

== Structure and format ==
The twelve teams play home and away matches from September through to April, making a total of twenty-two matches each. The results of the matches contribute points to the league as follows:

- 4 points are awarded for a win.
- 2 points are awarded for a draw.
- 0 points are awarded for a loss.

In addition:

- 1 losing (bonus) point is awarded to a team that loses a match by 7 points or fewer
- 1 additional (bonus) point is awarded to a team scoring 4 tries or more in a match

There is one automatic promotion place and two relegation places. The first-placed team at the end of season wins promotion to Regional 2 Anglia. The last two placed clubs are typically relegated to Counties 2 Essex.

== 2026–27 ==
Departing were Thurrock, promoted to Regional 2 Anglia while Upminster were relegated to Counties 2 Essex.

Team	Ground	Capacity	City/Area	Previous season
Billericay	Willowbrook	1,000	Billericay, Essex	7th
Burnham-on-Crouch	Dengie Hundred Sports Centre		Burnham-on-Crouch, Essex	Promoted from Counties 2 Essex
Campion	Cottons Park		Romford, London	5th
Chingford	Lea Valley Playing Fields		Chingford, London	8th
East London	Memorial Park		West Ham, London	6th
Epping Upper Clapton	Upland Road		Thornwood, Epping, Essex	2nd
Eton Manor II	The New Wilderness		Wanstead, London	Level transfer from Counties 1 Hertfordshire (5th)
Maldon	Drapers Farm Playing Fields		Heybridge, Essex	4th
Old Brentwoods	Ashwell Road		Pilgrims Hatch, Brentwood, Essex	Promoted from Counties 2 Essex
Romford & Gidea Park	Crowlands		Romford, London	3rd
Southend Priors	Warners Bridge Park		Southend, Essex	Level transfer from Counties 1 Hertfordshire (9th)
Stanford-le-Hope	Stanford Recreation Ground		Stanford-le-Hope, Essex	9th

Locations of the 2026–27 Counties 1 Essex teams in Essex
Locations of the 2026-27 Counties 1 Essex teams in Greater London

== 2025–26 ==
=== Participating clubs and locations ===
Departing were Braintree, promoted to Regional 2 Anglia while Burnham-on-Crouch (11th) and Basildon (12th) were relegated to Counties 2 Essex.

In October 2025 Old Cooperians (8th in '24–25) withdrew from the league with Mavericks (10th in '24–25) doing likewise in December leaving ten clubs to contest the outstanding fixtures.

Team	Ground	Capacity	City/Area	Previous season
Billericay	Willowbrook	1,000	Billericay, Essex	Promoted from Counties 2 Essex
Campion	Cottons Park		Romford, London	4th
Chingford	Lea Valley Playing Fields		Chingford, London	9th
East London	Memorial Park		West Ham, London	6th
Epping Upper Clapton	Upland Road		Thornwood, Epping, Essex	7th
Maldon	Drapers Farm Playing Fields		Heybridge, Essex	4th
Romford & Gidea Park	Crowlands		Romford, London	3rd
Stanford-le-Hope	Stanford Recreation Ground		Stanford-le-Hope, Essex	Promoted from Counties 2 Essex
Thurrock	Oakfield		Grays, Essex	Relegated from Regional 2SE
Upminster	Hall Lane		Upminster, London	5th

Locations of the 2025–26 Counties 1 Essex teams in Essex
Locations of the 2025–26 Counties 1 Essex teams in Greater London

== 2024–25 ==
=== Participating clubs and locations ===
Departing were Wanstead, promoted to Regional 2 Anglia and Stanford-le-Hope relegated to Counties 2 Essex. In their place came Burnham-on-Crouch (promoted from Counties 2 Essex (North)) and Basildon (promoted from Counties 2 Essex (South)).

Team	Ground	Capacity	City/Area	Previous season
Basildon	Gardiners Close		Basildon, Essex	Promoted from Counties 2 Essex (South) (champions)
Braintree	Robbswood		Braintree, Essex	2nd
Burnham-on-Crouch	Dengie Hundred Sports Centre		Burnham-on-Crouch, Essex	Promoted from Counties 2 Essex (North) (champions)
Campion	Cottons Park		Romford, London	9th
Chingford	Lea Valley Playing Fields		Chingford, London	11th
East London	Memorial Park		West Ham, London	4th
Epping Upper Clapton	Upland Road		Thornwood, Epping, Essex	3rd
Maldon	Drapers Farm Playing Fields		Heybridge, Essex	7th
Mavericks	Warley Playing Field		Warley, Brentwood, Essex	5th
Old Cooperians	Coopers' Company & Corborn School		Upminster, London	10th
Romford & Gidea Park	Crowlands		Romford, London	6th
Upminster	Hall Lane		Upminster, London	8th

Locations of the 2024–25 Counties 1 Essex teams in Essex
Locations of the 2024–25 Counties 1 Essex teams in Greater London

=== League table ===
Counties 1 Essex 2024–25
	Team	Played	Won	Drawn	Lost	Points for	Points against	Points diff	Try bonus	Loss bonus	Points	Points deducted
1	Braintree (P)	22	18	0	4	756	298	458	17	2	92	
2	Romford and Gidea Park	22	17	0	5	646	366	280	15	0	84	
3	Maldon	22	16	1	5	776	538	238	14	3	83	
4	Campion	22	16	0	6	719	462	257	17	1	82	
5	Upminster	22	13	0	9	686	474	212	13	7	72	
6	East London	22	12	0	10	625	523	102	11	4	63	
7	Epping Upper Clapton	22	10	0	12	398	524	−126	8	3	53	
8	Old Cooperians	22	7	2	13	375	580	−205	4	4	40	
9	Chingford	22	6	0	16	370	670	−300	6	1	31	
10	Mavericks	22	8	0	14	424	528	−104	10	2	29	−15
11	Burnham-on-Crouch (R)	22	4	0	18	329	788	−459	5	3	25	
12	Basildon (R)	22	3	1	18	357	710	−353	4	6	24	
If teams are level at any stage, tiebreakers are applied in the following order: 1. Number of matches won 2. Difference between points for and against 3. Total number of points for 4. Aggregate number of points scored in matches between tied teams 5. Number of matches won excluding the first match, then the second and so on until the tie is settled
Green background is the promotion place. Pink background are the relegation places. Updated: 10 January 2026; Source:

== 2023–24 ==
=== Participating clubs and locations ===
Departing were Dagenham and Harlow, promoted to Regional 2 Anglia, and South Woodham Ferrers relegated to Counties 2 Essex (North). In their place came Chingford (relegated from Regional 2 Anglia, Stanford-le-Hope and Maldon promoted from Counties 2 Essex.

Team	Ground	Capacity	City/Area	Previous season
Braintree	Robbswood		Braintree, Essex	4th
Campion	Cottons Park		Romford, London	6th
Chingford	Lea Valley Playing Fields		Chingford, London	relegated from Regional 2 Anglia (12th)
East London	Memorial Park		West Ham, London	5th
Epping Upper Clapton	Upland Road		Thornwood, Epping, Essex	7th
Maldon	Drapers Farm Playing Fields		Heybridge, Essex	Promoted from Counties 2 Essex (champions)
Mavericks	Warley Playing Field		Warley, Brentwood, Essex	9th
Old Cooperians	Coopers' Company & Corborn School		Upminster, London	10th
Romford & Gidea Park	Crowlands		Romford, London	8th
Stanford-le-Hope	Stanford Recreation Ground		Stanford-le-Hope, Essex	Promoted from Counties 2 Essex (runners-up)
Upminster	Hall Lane		Upminster, London	11th
Wanstead	Centenary Fields		Wanstead, London	3rd

Locations of the 2023–24 Counties 1 Essex teams in Essex
Locations of the 2023–24 Counties 1 Essex teams in Greater London

=== League table ===
Counties 1 Essex 2023–24
	Team	Played	Won	Drawn	Lost	Points for	Points against	Points diff	Try bonus	Loss bonus	Points	Points deducted
1	Wanstead (P)	22	20	1	1	745	159	586	13	1	99	+3
2	Braintree	22	17	0	5	797	362	435	16	3	88	+1
3	Epping Upper Clapton	22	15	1	6	575	440	135	13	2	78	+1
4	East London	22	13	0	9	575	453	122	12	2	66	
5	Mavericks	22	11	1	10	458	463	−5	7	2	55	
6	Romford and Gidea Park	22	10	0	12	494	581	−87	9	5	55	+1
7	Maldon	22	9	0	13	546	574	−28	9	4	49	
8	Upminster	22	9	1	12	470	686	−216	7	3	48	
9	Campion	22	9	0	13	467	487	−20	9	5	45	−5
10	Old Cooperians	22	6	0	16	401	550	−149	7	7	38	
11	Chingford	22	7	0	15	336	684	−348	4	3	35	
12	Stanford Le Hope (R)	22	4	0	18	413	838	−425	2	4	22	
If teams are level at any stage, tiebreakers are applied in the following order: 1. Number of matches won 2. Difference between points for and against 3. Total number of points for 4. Aggregate number of points scored in matches between tied teams 5. Number of matches won excluding the first match, then the second and so on until the tie is settled
Green background is the promotion place. Pink background is the relegation place. Updated: 9 January 2026; Source:

== 2022–23 ==
=== Participating clubs and locations ===
This was the first season following the RFU Adult Competition Review. The league was substantially similar to London 3 Essex with the teams finishing 1st–10th returning. Kings Cross Steelers and Canvey Island, who finished 11th and 12th respectively, were placed in Counties 2 Essex. The line-up was supplemented by the addition of Wanstead and South Woodham Ferrers (who finished 10th and 12th in London 2 North East respectively).

Team	Ground	Capacity	City/Area	Previous season
Braintree	Robbswood		Braintree, Essex	8th London 3 Essex
Campion	Cottons Park		Romford, London	5th London 3 Essex
Dagenham	Central Park		Dagenham, London	1st London 3 Essex
East London	Memorial Park		West Ham, London	7th London 3 Essex
Epping Upper Clapton	Upland Road		Thornwood, Epping, Essex	9th London 3 Essex
Harlow	Latton Park		Harlow, Essex	2nd London 3 Essex
Mavericks	Warley Playing Field		Warley, Brentwood, Essex	8th London 3 Essex
Old Cooperians	Coopers' Company & Corborn School		Upminster, London	4th London 3 Essex
Romford & Gidea Park	Crowlands		Romford, London	3rd London 3 Essex
South Woodham Ferrers	Saltcoats Playing Field		South Woodham Ferrers, Essex	12th London 2 North East
Upminster	Hall Lane		Upminster, London	10th London 3 Essex
Wanstead	Centenary Fields		Wanstead, London	10th London 2 North East

Locations of the 2022–23 Counties 1 Essex teams in Essex
Locations of the 2022–23 Counties 1 Essex teams in Greater London

=== League table ===
Counties 1 Essex 2022–23
	Team	Played	Won	Drawn	Lost	Points for	Points against	Points diff	Try bonus	Loss bonus	Points	Points deducted
1	Harlow (P)	22	22	0	0	1007	100	907	16	0	107	+3
2	Dagenham (P)	22	19	0	3	926	289	637	17	1	95	+1
3	Wanstead	22	16	1	5	570	309	261	9	1	77	+1
4	Braintree	22	13	1	8	539	497	42	9	3	67	+1
5	East London	22	12	1	9	630	664	−34	14	2	66	
6	Campion	22	13	0	9	427	571	−144	8	3	63	
7	Epping Upper Clapton	22	8	2	12	604	511	93	11	5	52	
8	Romford and Gidea Park	22	6	0	16	412	554	−142	6	5	36	+1
9	Mavericks	22	8	0	14	331	563	−232	3	2	32	−5
10	Old Cooperians	22	8	0	14	344	539	−195	5	0	27	−5
11	Upminster	22	3	1	18	356	988	−632	3	2	19	
12	South Woodham Ferrers (R)	22	1	0	21	195	756	−561	1	2	−8	-15
If teams are level at any stage, tiebreakers are applied in the following order: 1. Number of matches won 2. Difference between points for and against 3. Total number of points for 4. Aggregate number of points scored in matches between tied teams 5. Number of matches won excluding the first match, then the second and so on until the tie is settled
Green background are the promotion places. Pink background is the relegation places. Updated: 8 January 2026; Source:

== Counties 1 Essex honours (2022–present) ==
Following the RFU Adult Competition Review, ten teams were transferred from London 3 Essex (a level eight league) to Counties 1 Essex.a level seven league. Promotion is to Regional 2 Anglia and relegation to Counties 2 Essex

Counties 1 Essex
Season	No of teams	Champions	Runner-up	Relegated teams	Ref
2022–23	12	Harlow	Dagenham	South Woodham Ferrers (12th)	
2023–24	12	Wanstead	Braintree	Stanford Le Hope (12th)	
2024–25	12	Braintree	Romford and Gidea Park	Burnham-on-Crouch (11th) and Basildon (12th)	
Green background is the promotion place(s).

== See also ==
- Essex RFU
- London & SE Division RFU
- English rugby union system
- Rugby union in England
