= Barking RFC =

English rugby union club, based in Becontree, Dagenham

Coordinates: 51.532°N 0.129°E

(England) Barking
- Full name: Barking Rugby Union Football Club
- Union: Essex RFU
- Founded: 1930; 96 years ago
- Location: Becontree, Dagenham, London, England
- Captain(s): Thom McCaffrey, Harrison Reed
- 2025/2026: www.pitchero.com/clubs/barkingrufc/
Team kit

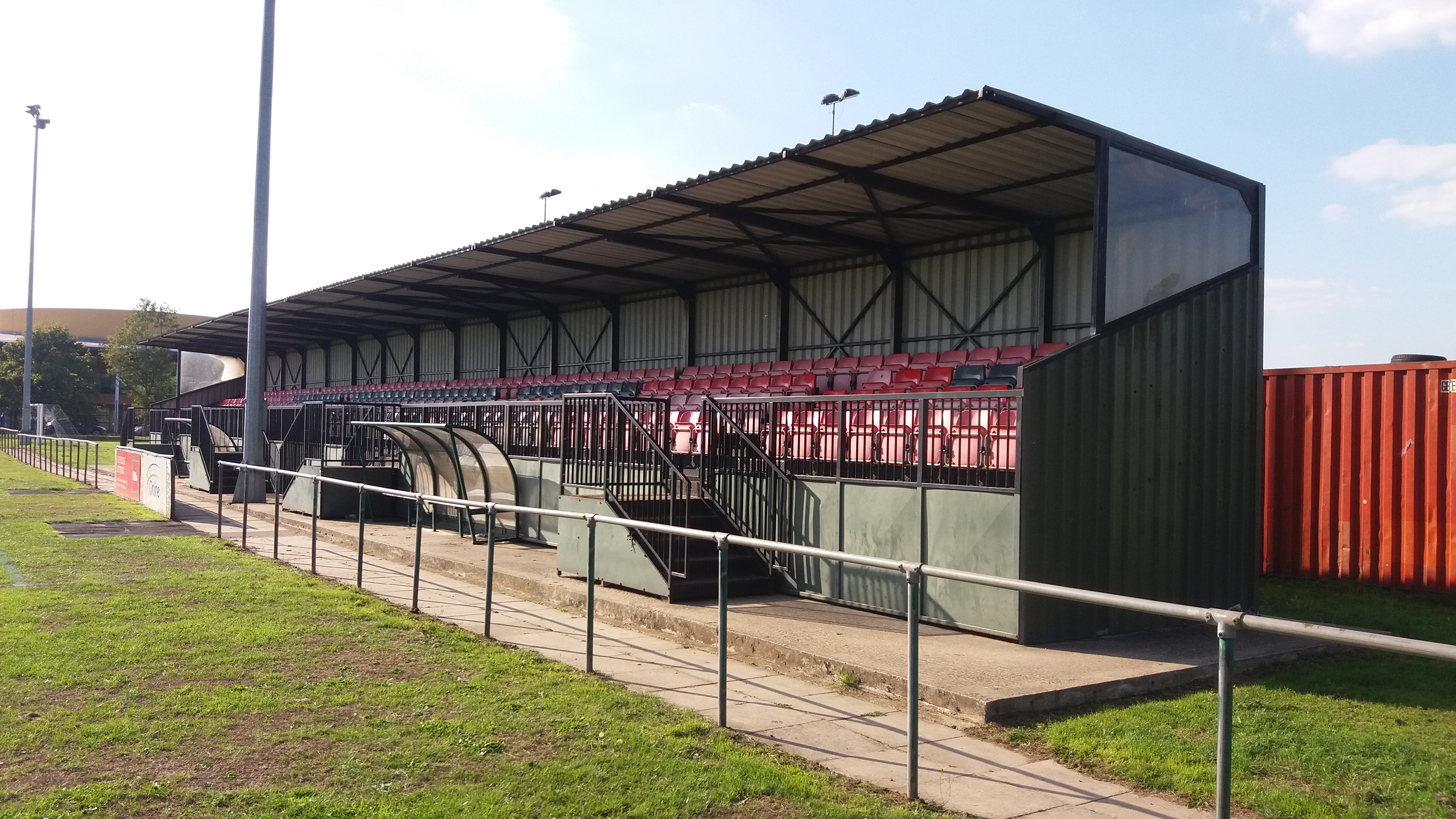
The main stand at Goresbrook

Barking RFC is an English rugby union team based in Barking, East London. The 1XV currently play in the Essex RFU merit leagues.

== History ==
=== Park Modern Old Boys ===
The club was founded in 1930, under the name of Park Modern Old Boys. In 1926 the Park Modern School in Barking was founded and the headmaster decided that the school would play rugby, despite football being the most popular sport in the area. As a result, the Old Boys team was created four years later and won 16 out of 19 games in its inaugural season.

=== Barking RFC ===
Old Boys continued to prosper after the Second World War. In 1974 they were declared no longer an Old Boys team, and so were obliged to change their name to Barking Park RFC, which became Barking RFC in 1976.

Barking were successful upon the introduction of leagues and moved slowly up the league ladder. Jason Leonard, whose total of 119 caps as a prop was the world record from 2004 to 2006, began his club career at Barking. In 1989 Barking opened their current ground at Goresbrook, Dagenham and have remained there since. They reached the National Leagues in 1994. After winning National Division Three South in the 2004–05 season, Barking enjoyed two seasons in National Division Two before being relegated in 2007. The season began with a crushing 63–10 defeat at the hands of newly promoted Mounts Bay, who were eventually crowned champions. This set the tone for a season in which the Eastenders were constantly staving off the threat of relegation. However, Barking survived by the narrowest of margins after defeating the very team who had destroyed them on the opening day and finished the league as champions. The 16–14 win at Goresbrook was enough to send Bristol-based Clifton down by a single point and secure another season of National League rugby for Barking.

In the 2010-11 National One season the club came within a few minutes of promotion to the 2011–12 RFU Championship when they faced London Scottish in the title decider, settled by a last-minute interception try that saw London Scottish win 17-13. This marked the beginning of a difficult time for the club with relegation from National League 1 in 2011-12 followed by relegation from National League 2 South in 2012-13, relegation from National League 3 London & SE in 2013-14 before consolidating with a 5th place finish in London 1 North in 2014-15. The club was relegated from that league in 2016-17, relegated from London 2 South East in 2017-18, relegated from London 3 Essex in 2019-20 then spending three seasons in Essex 1 (subsequently rebranded Counties 2 Essex) before being relegated out of the RFU pyramid and into the Essex RFU merit leagues at the end of the 2024-25 campaign.

Comedian and actor Nick Frost, known for his many film and television collaborations with Simon Pegg, is an ex-player.

== Honours ==
- London 3 North East champions: 1987–88
- London 1 champions: 1993–94
- National League 2 South (formerly known as National League 3 South) champions: 2004–05, 2009–10

== See also ==
- Essex RFU
