= Rochford Hundred RFC =

English rugby union club, based in Essex

(England) Rochford Hundred
- Full name: Rochford Hundred Rugby Club
- Union: Essex RFU
- Founded: 1962; 64 years ago
- Location: Hawkwell, Rochford, Essex
- Ground: The Rugby Park (Capacity: 1,250 (107 seats))
- Chairman: Steve Maguire
- President: Ray Stephenson
- Captain: Ben Thomas
- League: Regional 2 Anglia
- 2025–26: 7th

Official website
- www.rochfordrugby.com

Rochford Hundred Rugby Club is an English rugby union club based in Hawkwell near Rochford in Essex. The first XV team currently play in Regional 2 Anglia, having been relegated from the Regional 1 South East in season 2023–24. The club also operates other adult teams and a full academy set-up of junior teams for both boys and girls.

== History ==
=== Foundation ===
The foundations of Rochford Hundred date back to November 1961 when two rugby players, John Roden and Ernie Mills, met at the White Hart in Hawkwell to discuss plans for setting up a local rugby side, having both played for other Essex and London based clubs. The club held its inaugural meeting at the Bull Inn on the 4 January 1962. Further meetings secured the use of disused Rocheway School as its first ground, while the club name 'Rochford Hundred' was thought up by John Roden after he saw a poster advertising the Rochford Hundred Licensed Victuallers Association. Later that year the club had its first ever competitive fixture against Billericay.

=== Move to Magnolia Road ===
By the end of the 1960s performances on the pitch started to improve and the club started to consider moving to a new ground. In 1968 a potential location on Magnolia Road was found where there was a large field with sufficient room for a club-house and pitches. Originally Southend Manor Football Club had been looking at the same site but were unable to raise the money to purchase it, leaving it available for the rugby club. In March 1969 Rochford Hundred bought the land for £3,200 – part of which was funded by a loan from the Rugby Football Union. Further grants from a variety of sources enabled building work to begin at Magnolia Road in 1971, and the club-house was officially opened in April 1974 with Rochford Hundred facing an Eastern Counties XV.

=== League rugby ===
The introduction of the leagues in 1987 saw Rochford Hundred placed in the London and South East regional leagues. In 1992 the club their first ever league silverware, winning Eastern Counties 1 and gaining promotion into London 3 North East. Towards the end of the 1990s the club won the Essex Senior Cup in 1999, followed up by the London 3 North East league title in 2000, although the club was denied promotion due to RFU restructuring of the leagues. The new millennium saw the club denied promotion for the second year running, finishing second in the league but being outclassed by London 3 North West runners up Twickenham in the promotion playoff.

In 2003 Rochford Hundred won the Essex Senior Cup for the second time, sharing the trophy with Brentwood after the sides played out a 9–9 draw after extra time. League results that year were not so good and the club were relegated from London 3 North East after finishing 7th out of the 10 teams – victims of an unusual high number of relegations due to further RFU reshuffling. The club's relegation was short-lived as it finished as champions of London 4 North East at the end of the 2004–05 season to book an instant return to London 3 North East. The 2008–09 season would be a great success for the club as they won the double; firstly claiming the London 3 North East title and promotion to London 2 North, and then going on to win the Essex Intermediate Cup with a resounding 44–7 win over Romford.

Rochford Hundred would spend the next few years bouncing back and forth between levels 6 and 7, with relegation from the newly named London 1 North in 2010 followed by promotion from London 2 North West as champions in 2011, and then a further relegation from London 1 North in 2013. During this period the club also experienced success on the county scene, winning the Essex Intermediate Cup for the second time in 2014. Rochford Hundred would remain at level 7 until the 2017–18 season when it won London 2 North East for the fourth time. The club's winning form continued into the next season as it won a league and cup double, firstly claiming the 2018–19 London 1 North title and promotion to London & South East Premier – then they reached National League 2 east which at level 4 is the highest they have attained – and then going on to win the Essex Senior Cup for third time with a resounding victory over Brentwood.

== Ground ==
Rochford Hundred play at The Rugby Park on Magnolia Road in the parish of Hawkwell on the north-west outskirts of the town of Rochford. The ground consists of a club-house, three full-size rugby pitches and on-site parking. Capacity around the main pitch is approximately 1,250, including a 107 seater covered stand. Access to The Rugby Park is best served by car but there is the possibility of catching a train into Rochford railway station and walking the 1.5 miles to the ground, alternatively Hockley railway station and walking 1 mile to ground.

== Honours ==
- Eastern Counties 1 champions: 1991–92
- London 2 North East champions (4): 1999–00, 2008–09, 2010–11, 2017–18
- Essex Senior Cup winners (3): 1999, 2003 (Note: 2003 cup win shared with Brentwood after 9–9 draw.), 2019
- London 3 North East champions: 2004–05
- Essex Intermediate Cup (2): 2009, 2014
- London 1 North champions: 2018–19
- London & South East Premier champions: 2019–20
