= Harlow Rugby Club =

English rugby union club, based in Harlow, Essex

Harlow
- Full name: Harlow Rugby Club
- Union: Essex RFU
- Founded: 1955; 71 years ago
- Location: Harlow, Essex, England
- Ground(s): Ram Gorse 1959–2017; Latton Park 2017–
- Coach: Michael Weston
- Captain: Luke Bowering
- League: Regional 2 Anglia
- 2025–26: 6th

Official website
- www.harlow-rugby.co.uk

Harlow Rugby Club is a rugby union club based in Harlow, Essex, England. Harlow Rugby Club currently fields three mens teams and a ladies team. The first XV currently compete in Regional 2 Anglia – a league at tier 6 of the English rugby union system – following their relegation from London 2 North East at the end of the 2018–19 season, while the Rams (2nd XV) and Saints (3rd XV) compete in the Essex Shepherds Neame Clubs Leagues.

== History ==
The club came into existence on 8 December 1955 at a meeting in the Essex Skipper pub in Harlow. Founder members included; Alexander J McCowan, Dr John Huntley, Ron Bracewell, Ron Strudwick, Ron Parkin, Derek Jennings and Eric Jones. Harlow initially played in a white and green striped strip. The New Town Development Corporation provided grounds for the club at a token rent of £15 per annum. This ground wasn't usable to begin with so the club played rugby on a local farmer's field for the interim.

The Ram Gorse Club House was opened by Sir Richard Costain in 1959. Over the years, membership grew as Harlow attracted members from all over the UK, and especially from Wales. Harlow fielded more and more teams on match days. During the 1980/81 season Harlow were able to field seven different teams on a Saturday. During these years one of Harlow's cornerstone teams was the Saints. The Saints have had two unbeaten seasons during their time, 1975/76 and 1982/83.

Harlow's strength in depth continued over several decades after Gwynne Harris, the PE Advisor for West Essex Education Authority, for a number of years encouraged many high quality P.E. teachers from the Cardiff and other Welsh colleges to transfer their rugby skills and enhance their educational careers in the town and from this environment promising students were encouraged to join the club; the club built one of the highest quality junior rugby set-ups in the UK.

When leagues were formed in 1987–88, Harlow were placed in the Eastern Counties Division One. Thereafter, they were promoted every two years until finally reaching the London Division One in 1993. Harlow have never won the Essex Cup, however, Harlow has won the Eastern Counties Cup twice; first, in 1995 and second, in 1997; in 1999 a Harlow Sevens squad reached the Middlesex 7s finals at Twickenham Stadium beating Richmond in their last tournament as a professional club.

In July 2017 the club completed a move to a facility in the centre of Harlow named Latton Park.

== Colts rugby ==
Harlow Colts won 100 matches in a row from 1979 to 1981. Wasps, Saracens, Leicester, and Bristol were first-class teams Harlow Colts played. During this period, a number of Harlow players - Dave Hurley, Jonathan Locke and Wayne Kearns, were selected to play first-class rugby for Saracens and London Irish. Jonathan Locke and Wayne Kearns achieved junior international honours for England and Ireland U21s respectively. More recently, Harlow junior, Steven Pope, has represented London Wasps, Blackheath R.C., London Welsh and Swansea RFC rugby clubs and he has also represented England Divisions against South Africa.

== Honours ==
- Eastern Counties 1 champions: 1988–89
- London 3 North East champions: 1990–91
- London 3 North East champions: 2016–17
- Essex RFU Intermediate Cup champions: 2017–18
- Counties 1 Essex champions: 2022–23

== See also ==
- Essex RFU
