= Romford and Gidea Park Rugby Club =

English rugby union club, based in Romford, London

Romford and Gidea Park
- Full name: Romford and Gidea Park Rugby Club
- Founded: 1929; 97 years ago
- Location: Romford, Havering, London, England
- Ground(s): Crowlands, Crow Lane
- President: Dai Davies
- Captain: Ben Wrigg
- League: Counties 1 Essex
- 2024–25: 2nd

Official website
- www.pitchero.com/clubs/romfordgideapark

Romford and Gidea Park Rugby Club is a rugby union club in Romford, East London, England. They currently play in London & SE Division, Counties 1 Essex – a league at the seventh tier of the English rugby union system.

== Honours ==
- London Division 2 North East champions (3): 1993–94, 2002–03, 2011–12
- Essex Cup winners (4): 1990–91, 1993–94, 2011–12, 2013–14
- Essex 7’s winners (2) 1984–85, 1993–94.
- Essex Colts Cup winners (2) 1992–93, 1994–95.
- Ravens-National Cup winners 2013, 2014

== See also ==
- Essex RFU
