= Chingford RFC =

English rugby union club, based in Chingford, London

- Union: Essex RFU
- Founded: 1928; 98 years ago
- Location: Chingford, London, England
- Ground: Lea Valley Playing Fields
- League: Counties 1 Essex
- 2024–25: 9th

Chingford Rugby Club is an English rugby union club based in Chingford, London. The first XV team currently play in Counties 1 Essex. The club has had many ties with players playing for notable counties/clubs such as Eastern Counties, Essex, Saracens, London Irish, Northampton Saints, England U21's and Brive.

== History ==
The club was founded in 1928 by members of Chingford congregational church the club was originally known as “Chingford Guild Rugby Club”. A ground was loaned by a local milkman named Mr Soper adjacent to the reservoirs at Lee Valley. Members of the club then built a changing building with two changing rooms, plunge bath and water heating stove. A double Decker bus was acquired for the spectators and the players washed in a local piggery. In 1930, the club was renamed Chingford Rugby Club and in 1945 the club was reformed using an old army hut. The original building had been destroyed during the 2nd World War on VE night. This hut was used until 1947 when the “Rendezvous Café” was used for changing. During the fifties the club moved to its previous site. The clubhouse was extended in 1960, again in 1968, and finally in 2012 by contributors to it present size.

In 2018, the club reached the highest level in its history, obtaining promotion after winning the London 1 North/London 1 South promotion play-off.

== Honours ==
- London 2 North East champions (2): 1989–90, 2004–05
- London 1 (north v south) promotion play-off winner: 2017–18

== See also ==
- Essex RFU
