= Westcliff RFC =

English rugby union club, based in Essex

(England) Westcliff
- Full name: Westcliff Rugby Football Club
- Union: Essex RFU
- Nickname: The Lions
- Founded: 1922; 104 years ago
- Location: Eastwood, Southend-on-Sea, England
- Region: Essex
- Ground(s): The Gables, Cherry Orchard Way (Capacity: 2,000)
- Chairman: James Evans
- President: Nick Crowe
- Coach: Danny Johnston
- Captain: Greg Bannister
- League: Regional 1 South East
- 2025–26: 9th

Official website
- www.westcliffrfc.co.uk

Westcliff Rugby Football Club is an English rugby union team based in Eastwood, a suburb of Southend-on-Sea in Essex. The club was formed in 1922 as Old Westcliffians Rugby Football Club, for ex-pupils of Westcliff High School and took the current name of Westcliff Rugby Club in the 1990s. They run four senior teams and the full range of junior teams. The men's 1st XV currently play in Regional 1 South East, level 5 of the English rugby pyramid, having experienced successive relegations from National League 2 East (2022–23) and Regional 1 South East (2023–24) and promotion from Regional 2 Anglia in 2024–25.

== Honours ==
- Eastern Counties 2 South champions: 2002–03
- Essex 1 champions: 2003–04
- London Division 3 North East champions: 2007–08
- London Division 1 North champions (2): 2010–11, 2013–14
- LSE Premier v SW Premier promotion play-off winners: 2018–19
- Regional 2 Anglia champions: 2024–25

== See also ==
- Essex RFU
