= Thurrock RFC =

English rugby union club, based in Grays, Essex

(England) Thurrock RFC
- Full name: Thurrock Rugby Football Club
- Union: Rugby Football Union
- Founded: 1928; 98 years ago
- Location: Grays, Essex, England
- Ground: Oakfield
- Chairman: Andy Stanford
- President: Brian Howells
- Coach: Andy Yarrow
- Captain: Caolan Watts-Adams
- Most caps: Nathaniel Farrell (207)
- Top scorer: Jake Barrand
- League: Counties 1 Essex
- 2025–26: 1st (promoted to Regional 2 Anglia)

Official website
- www.thurrockrfc.com

Thurrock Rugby Football Club is an English rugby union team based in Grays, Essex. The club runs four senior sides, a colts side and the full range of junior teams. The club also operates women's teams in both union and league. The senior side is called T-Birds with the two youth sides called T-Chicks. The first XV currently play in Regional 2 Anglia following their promotion from Counties 1 Essex at the end of the 2025–26 season.

== History ==
Thurrock Rugby Football Club was formed in 1928 as Grays Rugby Football Club and adopted their present identity after World War II to reflect the wider area from where players were drawn from. The club saw plenty of success during the 1970s, including completing the Eastern Counties Cup and the Essex Cup Double three years in a row from 1974 to 76. Four years later the club reached the final rounds of the Middlesex 7s. The introduction of the league system in 1987 saw the club placed in London 2 North and won promotion to London 1 three seasons later. The 1991–92 season saw the club win another promotion, this time to National 4 South but were relegated back into London 1 the following season. The club returned to the National Leagues in 2012 following promotion from what was by now London 1 North.

== Honours ==
- London 1 North champions (2): 1989–90, 2011–12 (Note: London 1 North was formerly known as London 2 North when Thurrock first won the league title back in 1989–90.)
- London Division 2 North East champions: 2009–10
- Papa Johns Trophy winners 2024-2025
- Counties 1 Essex (level 7 champions: 2025–26

== See also ==
- Thurrock T-Birds – women's side
