= Essex Rugby Football Union =

Essex RFU
- Full name: Essex Rugby Football Union
- Union: RFU
- Founded: 1885; 141 years ago (Note: Although formed in 1885, Essex had to wait until 2003 to gain full RFU constituent body status.)
- Region: Essex, parts of London
- Chairman: Alan Brooking
- President: Mick Eyres
Team kit

Official website
- essexcountyrfucb.rfu.club

The Essex Rugby Football Union is the governing body for the sport of rugby union in the county of Essex in England. The union is the constituent body of the Rugby Football Union (RFU) for Essex, and administers and organises rugby union clubs and competitions in the county. It also administers the Essex county rugby representative teams.

== History ==
The Essex RFU was established in 1885. The first recorded match played by an Essex representative team was actually held a year before the union was created, when they lost to a representative team from neighbouring Suffolk at Chelmsford in 1884. In December 1890 Essex would join with Suffolk and Norfolk to form the Eastern Counties Rugby Union, with Cambridgeshire joining later in 1920 and would participate in the County Championship. Essex would try and leave the Eastern Counties and gain constituent body status but were refused by the Rugby Football Union three times in 1972, 1975 and 1977. Finally in 2003 the county were awarded full status and would compete in the County Championship as an Essex side.

== Senior county team ==
The Essex senior men's team currently play in Division 3 of the County Championship. The 2018 competition also marked the county's first appearance at Twickenham Stadium when they reached the Shield final, losing 22-24 to Dorset & Wilts.

== Affiliated clubs ==
There are currently 45 clubs affiliated with the Essex RFU, with teams at both senior and junior level.

- Bancroft
- Barking
- Basildon
- Benfleet Vikings
- Billericay
- Braintree
- Brentwood
- Burnham-On-Crouch
- Clacton (Note: Clacton are joint members of both Essex RFU and Suffolk RFU.)
- Campion
- Canvey Island
- Chelmsford
- Chingford
- Dagenham
- East London
- Epping Upper Clapton (Note: Epping Upper Clapton are members of both the and Essex RFU and Middlesex RFU.)
- Eton Manor
- Harlow
- Harwich & Dovercourt
- Ilford Wanderers
- Kelvedon and Feering RUFC
- Kings Cross Steelers
- Loughton
- Maldon
- Mavericks
- May & Baker
- Millwall (Note: Millwall are members of both the and Essex RFU and Middlesex RFU.)
- Old Brentwoods
- Old Cooperians
- Ongar
- Pegasus Palmerians
- Ravens
- Rochford Hundred
- Romford & Gidea Park
- Runwell Wyverns
- South Woodham Ferrers
- Southend
- Stanford-le-Hope
- Thames
- Upminster
- Wanstead
- Westcliff
- Witham
- Woodford
- Writtle Wanderers

== County club competitions ==
The Essex RFU currently helps run the following club competitions:

=== Leagues ===
- Regional 1 South East - formally known as 'National 3 and London & SE Premier', this league is formed of teams from the Anglia and South East regions. This league is ranked at level 5 English rugby union system.
- Regional 2 Anglia - formally known as 'London 1', this league is formed of 12 teams from Eastern Counties and Essex. This league is ranked at level 6.
- Counties 1 Essex - formally known as 'London 2', league ranked at level 7.
- Counties 2 Essex - formally known as 'London 3', league ranked at level 8.
- Essex Merit Tables - 6 divisions outside the league system mostly involving reserve team rugby (2nd to 5th XV) with the occasional 1st XV side

=== Cups ===
1st team:

- Essex Senior Cup
- Essex Intermediate Cup
- Essex Senior Shield

2nd team:

- Essex 2nd XV Cup
- John Adler Trophy

=== Discontinued competitions ===
- Essex 1 (Canterbury Jack) - tier 9, this league was merged to Counties 1 & 2 for the 2022-2023 season,
- Essex 2 (Spitfire) - tier 10 league that ran between 2003 and 2014
- Essex 3 - tier 11 league that ran between 2003 and 2009

== See also ==
- London & SE Division
- English rugby union system
