= Brentwood RFC =

English rugby union club, based in Brentwood, Essex

Brentwood
- Union: Essex RFU
- Location: Brentwood, Essex
- Ground: King George's Playing Fields (Capacity: 3,000)
- League: Regional 2 Anglia
- 2025–26: 3rd
Team kit

Brentwood Rugby Football Club is an English rugby union club based in Brentwood, Essex. The first XV team currently plays in Regional 2 Anglia, having been relegated from London & South East Premier at the end of the 2018–19 season.

== Honours ==
- London 3 North East champions: 1992–93
- Essex Senior Cup winners: 2003 (Note: 2003 cup win shared with Rochford Hundred after 9–9 draw.)
- London 3 (north-east v north-west) promotion play-off winner: 2008–09
- London 1 North champions 2017–18

== See also ==
- Essex RFU
