= Roydon, South Norfolk =

Coordinates: 52.381°N 1.081°E

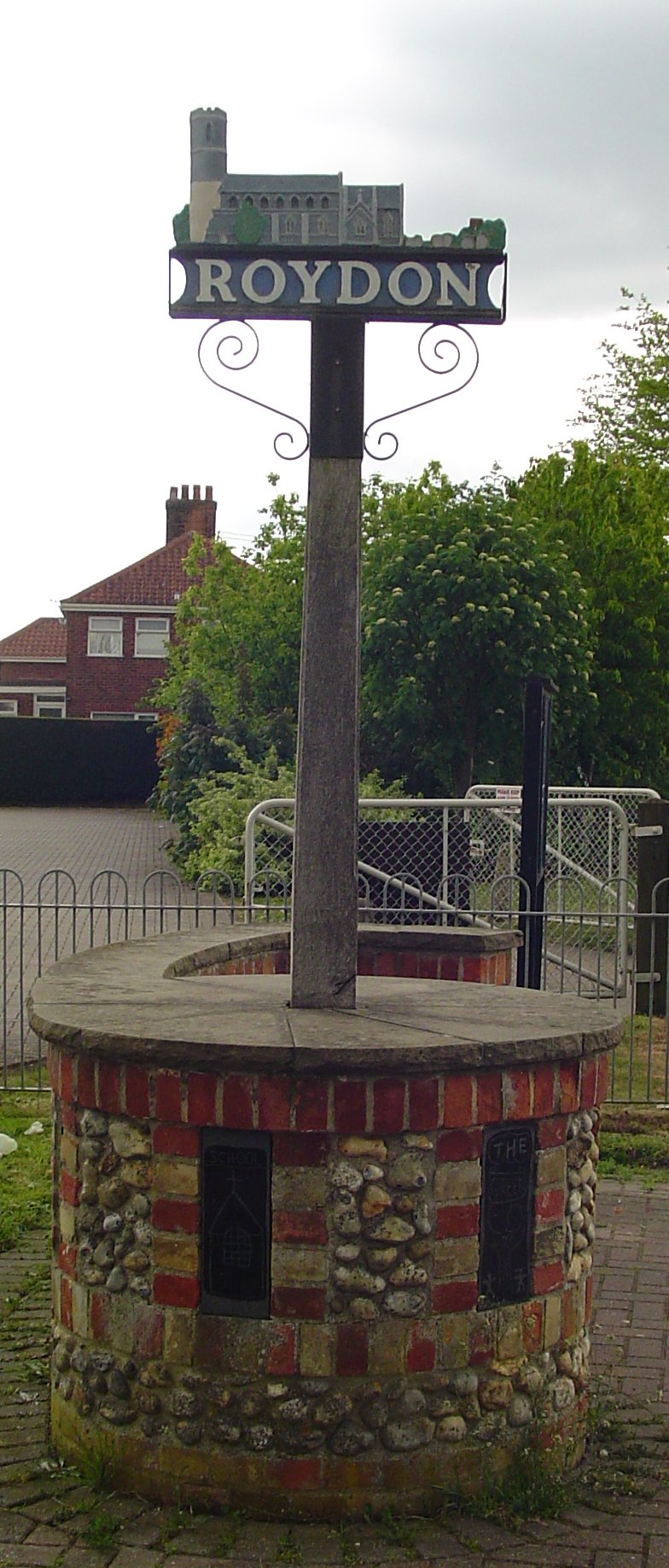
- Signpost in Roydon

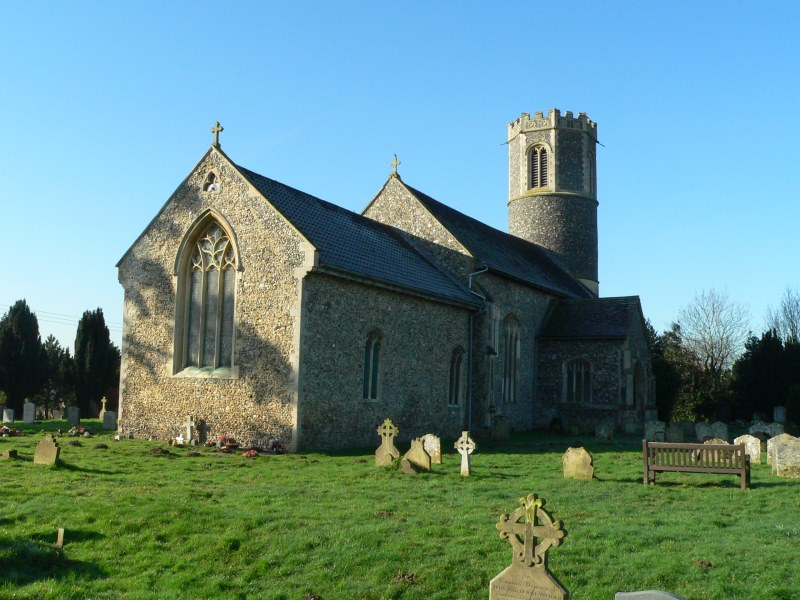
- St Remigius church

- Location within Norfolk
- Area: 5.54 km^{2} (2.14 sq mi)
- Population: 2,457
  - Density: 444/km^{2} (1,150/sq mi)
- OS grid reference: TM097803
  - London: 102.6 mi
- Civil parish: Roydon, South Norfolk
- District: South Norfolk
- Shire county: Norfolk
- Region: East
- Country: England
- Sovereign state: United Kingdom
- Post town: DISS
- Postcode district: IP22
- Dialling code: 01379
- Police: Norfolk
- Fire: Norfolk
- Ambulance: East of England

Roydon is a small village, parish and electoral ward in the county of Norfolk, England, about a mile west of Diss. It lies on a rise above the flood plain north of the River Waveney, which also acts as the county boundary with Suffolk. The parish covers an area of 5.54 km^{2} (2.14 sq mi) and had a population of 2,358 in 981 households at the 2001 census, the population of both parish and ward increasing to 2,457 at the 2011 Census.

The main part of the village is centred on the High Road, the A1066. Here there are 20th century residential estates to the north and a ribbon of development to the south side dating from the 1930s. The hamlet of Snow Street lies further north, composed of several thatched homes and more recent developments. There are further small clusters of housing at Roydon Fen, Brewers Green and Baynards Green.

== History ==
Roydon means 'rye hill' in Old English. It is mentioned in 1035 as Rygedune, and as Regadona and Regheduna in the Domesday Book, and later in 1242 as Reydon. However, there was settlement in the area long before with worked flint having been found in the area from the Paleolithic and Neolithic periods.

In 1603 there were 124 communicants, and in 1736 there were 60 families, totalling 240 souls. In 1736 it was assessed for tax at 630 and a half pounds.

The Roydon Riots were sparked in 1893 by the decision of the Lord of the Manor, John Tudor Frere, to fence off the last remaining sections of common land in the parish, including at Brewers Green. While several offenders were convicted of offences related to the riots, villages were considered to have won a moral victory in that the punishments were considered light and Brewers Green remains open land to this day.

== Buildings ==
The church, St Remigius, is one of 124 existing round-tower churches in Norfolk and the oldest building in the village. The structure dates mostly from the 12-14th centuries although the interior is mostly Victorian. There is a 15th-century font and a 17th-century pulpit. The dedication day was kept on the first of October, being the day of his translation. Next to the church is the White Hart public house.

The largest single house is Roydon Hall, a Grade II listed red-brick mansion to the west of the parish. In the 18th century the Hall was home to the pioneering antiquary and archaeologist John Frere.

Roydon's current village hall, on the High Road, was built in 1988 on the site of a previous building. The exterior wall hosts a relief carving relocated from Aldrich Brothers brush factory, in Factory Lane, which was demolished in 1972.

The village primary school, Roydon Primary, teaches more than 200 pupils from ages 4 to 11, Reception to Year 6.

== Governance ==
Roydon has a Parish Council consisting of nine members. It is currently within South Norfolk District Council and Norfolk County Council but is expected to fall under the new, unitary East Norfolk Council when this replaces the district and county councils in 2028.

== Open spaces ==
Roydon Fen is a 49-acre wetland nature reserve to the south of the parish, managed by Suffolk Wildlife Trust. Flint tools dating back 10,000 years were found on the site, which was once cut by villagers for sedge and peat.

Brewers Green is a County Wildlife Site managed by volunteers with the help of Norfolk Wildlife Trust and features grassland, a small wood and several ponds.

Quaker Wood on Factory Lane is a 5.5 acre open space managed by Diss Community Woodland Project. It was established in 2010 and features mostly young woodland, a pond, meadow and paths.
