= Southend RFC =

English rugby union football club

(England) Southend RFC
- Full name: Southend Rugby Football Club
- Union: Essex RFU
- Nickname: Saxons
- Founded: 1870; 156 years ago
- Ground: Warners Park (Capacity: 1,500 (150 seats))
- Chairman: David Short & Ken Baynes
- President: David Ridler
- Captain(s): Matt Wagstaff & Ben Lloyd
- League: Regional 1 South East
- 2025–26: 4th
Team kit

Official website
- www.southendrugby.com

Southend Rugby Club (also known as Southend Saxons) is an English rugby union football club based in Southend-on-Sea, Essex. The club currently plays in the fifth tier of English club rugby, participating in Regional 1 South East following their promotion from Regional 2 Anglia at the end of the 2023–24 season. The club runs six senior sides, including a women's team (the Saints) and a full range of age grade teams.

== History ==
Southend RFC was formed in 1870 and was originally called Southend Foot Ball Club. The club moved to its current location in 1978 and this heralded a golden period for the club, including three county cup victories in the decade before club rugby was introduced. The club was placed in Area 4 South but relegations saw the club relegated to London North East 3 by the turn of the millennium. However, a major turnaround saw the club back in the national leagues by 2003 and the club has remained at that level ever since, having returned to the level in which the club when the leagues were founded in 1987. In 2014, the first team name was changed to Southend Saxons.

== Honours ==
- London Division 3 North East champions: 2000–01
- London 2 (north v south) promotion playoff winners: 2001–02
- London Division 1 champions: 2002–03
- National League Division 3 South champions: 2006–07
- Essex Senior Cup winners: 2003–04
- Regional 2 Anglia champions: 2023–24

== See also ==
- Essex RFU
- English rugby union system
