= Eton Manor RFC =

English rugby union club, based in Wanstead, London

(England) Eton Manor
- Full name: Eton Manor Rugby Club
- Union: Essex RFU
- Nickname(s): Blue&Blue
- Founded: 1928; 98 years ago
- Location: Wanstead, Redbridge, London, England
- Ground: The New Wilderness Nutter Lane (Capacity 104 + Standing)
- Chairman: Dave Dennis
- President: Martin Pearl
- Captain: George Cosma
- League: Regional 2 Anglia
- 2025–26: 1st (promoted to Regional 1 South East)

Eton Manor Rugby Club is an English rugby union club based in the London Borough of Redbridge. The first XV team currently play in Regional 2 South East following their promotion from Regional 2 Anglia at the end of 2025–26 season.

The club spent a single season in National League 3 London & SE (in 2015–16) but was immediately relegated back to London 1 North. The 2nd XV are on their debut season in Counties 1 Hertford as "Eton Manor 1928's" and the clubs 3rd XV Play in Essex Merit 2. The 4th XV form part of a combined 4's/Vets side that play occasional friendlies. 2025–26 season also saw the debut of Eton Manor Women's 2nd XV.

== Honours ==
- London 2 North East champions (2): 1988–89, 2005–06
- London 2 North champions: 1990–91
- Eastern Counties 1 champions: 2000–01
- London 1 (north v south) promotion play–off winner: 2014–15
- Regional 2 Anglia (level 6) champions: 2025–26

== See also ==
- Essex RFU
