= Hawkwell =

Village in Essex, England

Coordinates: 51.592085°N 0.673722°E

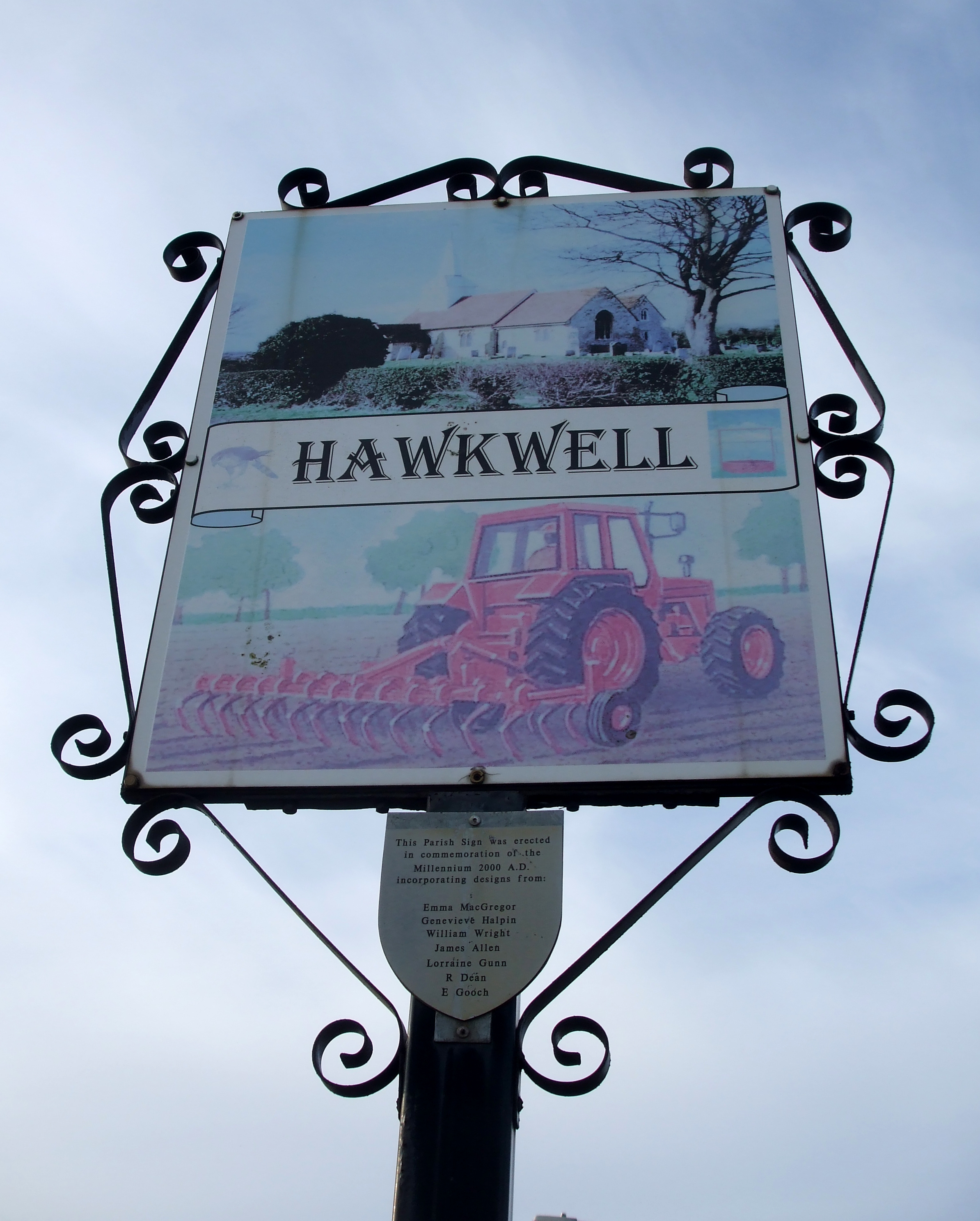
- One of the village signs

- Location within Essex
- Population: 12,061 (Parish, 2021)
- OS grid reference: TQ853915
- Civil parish: Hawkwell
- District: Rochford
- Shire county: Essex
- Region: East
- Country: England
- Sovereign state: United Kingdom
- Post town: HOCKLEY
- Postcode district: SS5
- Dialling code: 01702
- Police: Essex
- Fire: Essex
- Ambulance: East of England
- UK Parliament: Rayleigh and Wickford

Hawkwell is a village and civil parish in the Rochford district of Essex, England. The main part of the village is contiguous with Hockley to the west. On the eastern side of the parish it also includes part of the built up area of Rochford. At the 2021 census the parish had a population of 12,061.

== History ==
=== Name ===
Over the course of history Hawkwell has been referred to by several different terms and various spellings, it appears in the Domesday Book of 1086 as Hacuuella or Hechuuella. It has also been called 'Hawkeswell' in the 16th century.

== Settlement ==
The main part of Hawkwell village, to the west of the railway line, forms part of the "Hockley and Hawkwell" built up area as defined by the Office for National Statistics. Hawkwell parish east of the railway is also mostly developed and forms parts of the Rochford and Ashingdon built up areas.

The White Hart public house at the corner of Main Road and White Hart Lane was historically in Hawkwell parish, but was transferred to Hockley parish in 1994. Since then, the only public house within Hawkwell parish is the Victory Inn on Ashingdon Road at the eastern end of the parish.

== Church ==
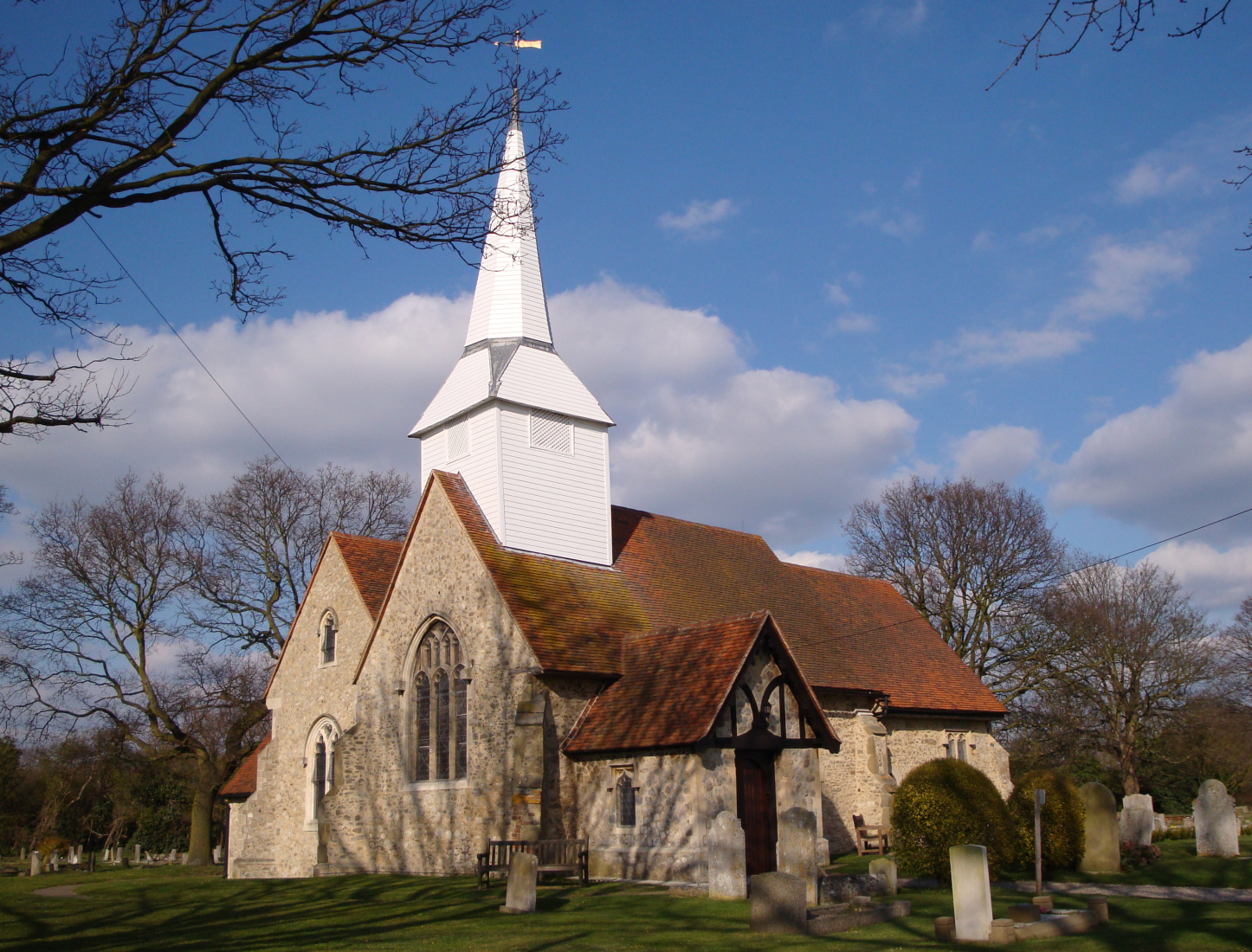
St Mary's Church, Hawkwell

The parish church of St Mary the Virgin is located amidst fields between the two centres of population. The building is Grade II* listed building, and is largely from the fourteenth century, with the addition of a fifteenth-century bell turret and some other alterations. It was restored in the nineteenth century, and includes twentieth-century stained glass in the south and east windows. The building was damaged during a bombing raid on 15 September 1940. The concrete and asbestos vestry on the north side was removed in the 1990s, and was replaced by a north aisle, vestry and office constructed in a style to match the rest of the building. The extension nearly doubled the size of the building, and was opened in July 1996.

== Amenities ==
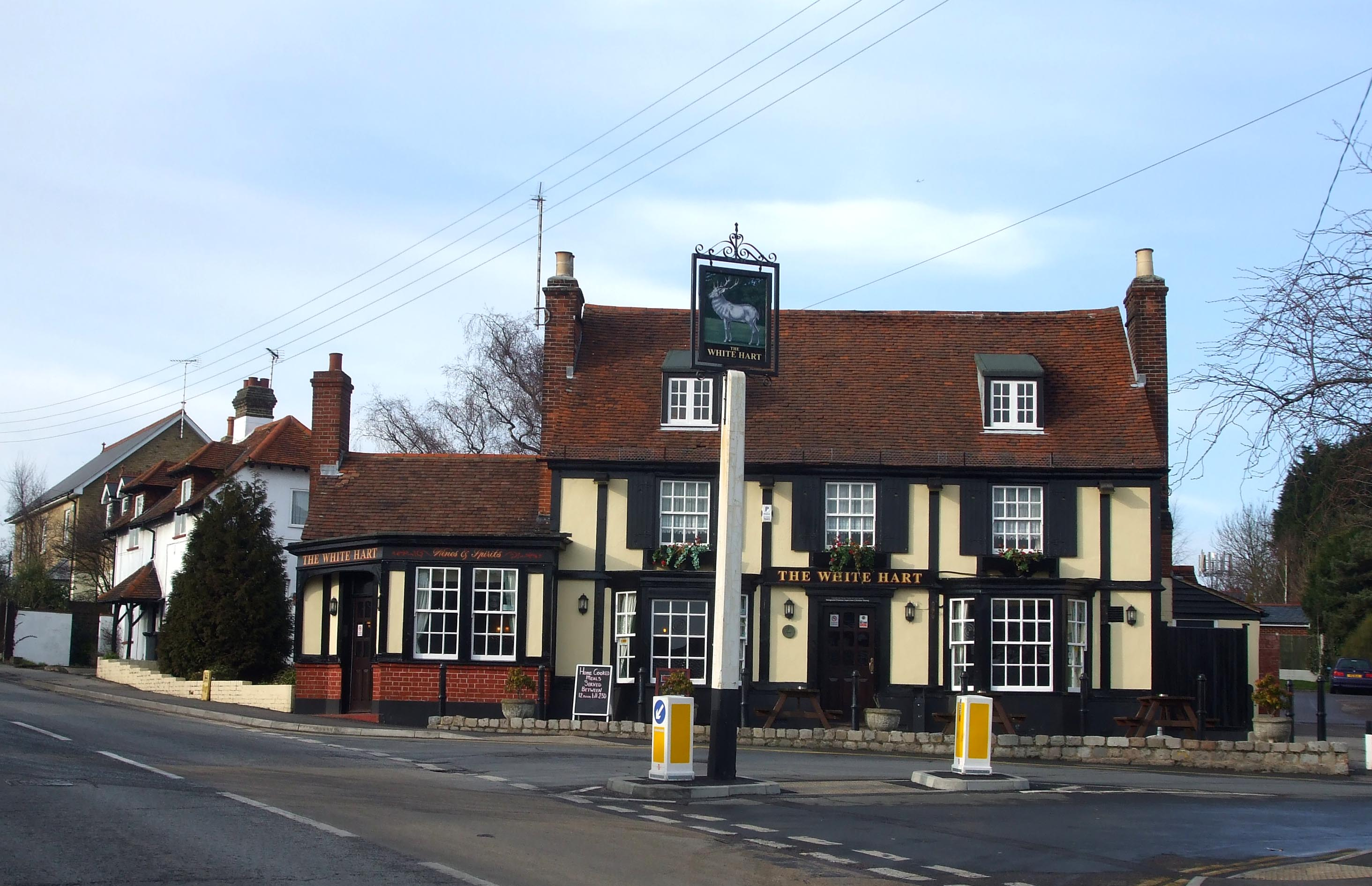
The White Hart public house

The village has a primary school, leisure centre, pub and other amenities.
