= 2017–18 London & South East Premier =

- Countries: England; Guernsey
- Date: 2 September 2017 – April 2018

The 2017–18 London & South East Premier season is the 31st season of level 5 in the London and South East region of English rugby union. It consists of thirteen teams from England and one from the Channel Island of Guernsey. It will be the first season organised under the London & South East Premier title following the rename from "National League 3 London & SE" during the off-season. This decision was made by the Rugby Football Union because it was felt that the league title was misleading as it was not a nationwide league but was instead the highest level of rugby in the London and South East region.

The winners are promoted to National League 2 South with the runners-up entering a play-off against the runner-up of South West Premier. The bottom three are relegated to either London 1 North or London 1 South.

== Teams ==
Fourteen teams will compete in the 2017–18 London & South East Premier season. Nine of the teams competing made up the previous year's National League 3 London & SE league. Leaving the league were Tonbridge Juddians who were promoted to National League 2 South as champions of the previous year. Wimbledon were also promoted from the league after winning a play-off against National League 3 South West runners-up, Dings Crusaders. Amersham and Chiltern, Chichester and Colchester were all relegated from the league due to finishing in the relegation places.

Promoted into the league are Tring as champions of London 1 North and Sidcup as winners of London 1 South. The final promoted team is Tunbridge Wells who finished second in London 1 South and defeated Chingford in a promotion play-off to earn back-to-back promotions and play at Level 5 for the first time in their history. Barnes also joined the league after being relegated from 2016–17 National League 2 South. Owing to an imbalance in the leagues between the regions, Towcestrians were level transferred into London & South East Premier from Midlands Premier.

=== Locations ===
Locations of the 2017–18 London & South East Premier teams

Team	Ground	Capacity	City/Area	Previous season
Barnes	Barn Elms		Barnes, London	Relegated from National League 2 South (15th)
Dorking	The Big Field		Dorking, Surrey	8th
Guernsey	Footes Lane	5,000	Saint Peter Port, Guernsey	5th
Guildford	Broadwater Sports Club		Farncombe, Surrey	9th
Hertford	Highfields		Ware, Hertfordshire	3rd
Shelford	The Davey Field		Great Shelford, Cambridgeshire	6th
Sidcup	Crescent Farm		Sidcup, London	Promoted from London 1 South (champions)
Southend Saxons	Warners Bridge Park		Southend, Essex	11th
Sutton & Epsom	Rugby Lane		Cheam, London	10th
Towcestrians	Greens Norton Road		Towchester, Northamptonshire	Level transfer from Midlands Premier (10th)
Tring	Pendley Sports Centre		Tring, Hertfordshire	Promoted from London 1 North (champions)
Tunbridge Wells	St Mark's Recreation Ground	3,000	Royal Tunbridge Wells, Kent	Promoted from London 1 South (play-off)
Westcliff	The Gables		Eastwood, Southend-on-Sea, Essex	7th
Westcombe Park	Goddington Dene		Orpington, London	4th

== Table ==
2017–18 London & South East Premier table
Pos	Team	Pld	W	D	L	PF	PA	PD	TB	LB	Pts	Qualification
1	Barnes (P)	26	22	0	4	944	380	+564	20	3	111	Promotion place
2	Guernsey (P)	26	22	0	4	962	446	+516	19	3	110	Play-off place
3	Tring	26	21	1	4	783	414	+369	16	3	105	
4	Hertford	26	20	1	5	896	484	+412	20	3	105	
5	Tunbridge Wells	26	14	0	12	681	557	+124	16	5	77	
6	Westcliff	26	14	0	12	816	555	+261	15	4	75	
7	Shelford	26	11	0	15	672	688	−16	12	3	59	
8	Sidcup	26	11	0	15	654	790	−136	11	4	59	
9	Dorking	26	10	1	15	646	725	−79	11	4	57	
10	Sutton & Epsom	26	10	0	16	634	875	−241	13	4	57	
11	Guildford	26	7	1	18	604	834	−230	15	7	52	
12	Westcombe Park (R)	26	9	1	16	511	759	−248	8	3	49	Relegation place
13	Southend Saxons (R)	26	5	0	21	458	1052	−594	6	4	30	Relegation place
14	Towcestrians (R)	26	3	1	22	386	1088	−702	5	1	20	Relegation place

Updated to match(es) played on 07 June 2018. Source: "London & South East Premier". RFU.
Rules for classification: If teams are level at any stage, tiebreakers are applied in the following order:
1. Number of matches won
2. Difference between points for and against
3. Total number of points for
4. Aggregate number of points scored in matches between tied teams
5. Number of matches won excluding the first match, then the second and so on until the tie is settled
