= Regional 1 South East =

Level five league in the English rugby union system

- Current season or competition: 2025–26 Regional 1 South East
- Sport: Rugby union
- Instituted: 1987; 39 years ago (as London 1)
- Number of teams: 12
- Country: England
- Holders: Colchester (2nd title) (2025–26 (promoted to National League 2 East))
- Most titles: Barnes, Basingstoke, Canterbury, Colchester, Havant and Westcombe Park (2 titles)
- Website: clubs.rfu.com

Regional 1 South East (formerly known as London & South East Premier and National League 3 London & South East) is a level five league in the English rugby union system. It is one of six leagues at this level. When this division began in 1987 it was known as London Division 1. The format of the league was changed at the beginning of the 2009–10 season following re-organisation by the Rugby Football Union while the name change from National League 3 to Premier was introduced for the 2017–18 season to make it more obvious that it is a regional league. London & South East Premier was the highest regional rugby union league covering London and south east England. Following the RFU Adult Competition Review the league was decreased from 14 to 12 and the name changed to Regional 1 South East. Part of the area formerly covered by London & South East Premier is now covered by a new league Regional 1 South Central.

Colchester are the 2025–26 champions.

== Format ==
The twelve teams play home and away matches from September through to March, making a total of twenty-two matches each. The results of the matches contribute points to the league as follows:

- 4 points are awarded for a win
- 2 points are awarded for a draw
- 0 points are awarded for a loss, however
- 1 losing (bonus) point is awarded to a team that loses a match by 7 points or fewer
- 1 additional (bonus) point is awarded to a team scoring 4 tries or more in a match

The first-placed team at the end of season win promotion to National League 2 East. Two teams are relegated to either Regional 2 South East, Regional 2 Anglia or Regional 2 Thames depending on location.

== 2026–27 ==
Departing were Colchester, promoted to National 2 East whilst Amersham & Chiltern (10th - play-off losers), Medway (11th) and Shelford (12th) were relegated to Regional 2 Thames, Regional 2 South East and Regional 2 Midlands East respectively.

=== Participating teams and locations ===
Team	Ground	Capacity	City/Area	Previous season
Eton Manor	The New Wilderness		Wanstead, London	Promoted from Regional 2 Anglia (champions)
Hertford	Highfields		Ware, Hertfordshire	7th
Letchworth Garden City	Legends Lane, Baldock Road		Letchworth, Hertfordshire	2nd
Northampton Old Scouts	Rushmere Road		Northampton, Northamptonshire	Promoted from Regional 2 Midlands East (champions)
North Walsham	Norwich Road	1,200	Scottow, Norfolk	6th
Old Colfeians	Horn Park		Lee, London	Promoted from Regional 2 South East (5th - play-off winner)
Old Northamptonians	Sir Humphrey Cripps Pavilion		Northampton, Northamptonshire	8th
Sidcup	Crescent Farm		Sidcup, Kent	Promoted from Regional 2 South East (champions)
Southend Saxons	Warners Park	1,500 (150 seats)	Southend, Essex	4th
Sudbury	Whittome Field		Great Cornard, Sudbury, Suffolk	5th
Tring	Pendley Sports Centre	750	Tring, Hertfordshire	3rd
Westcliff	The Gables	1,000	Eastwood, Essex	9th

Locations of the 2026–27 Regional 1 South East teams

== 2025–26 ==
Departing were Oundle, promoted to National 2 East whilst Harpenden (11th) and Bedford Athletic (12th) were relegated to Regional 2 Thames and Regional 2 Midlands East respectively.

Team	Ground	Capacity	City/Area	Previous season
Amersham & Chiltern	Weedon Lane		Amersham, Buckinghamshire	10th
Colchester	Raven Park	1,200	Colchester, Essex	Relegated from National 2 East (12th)
Hertford	Highfields		Ware, Hertfordshire	6th
Letchworth Garden City	Legends Lane, Baldock Road		Letchworth, Hertfordshire	2nd
Medway	Priestfields		Rochester, Kent	Promoted from Regional 2 South East (champions)
North Walsham	Norwich Road	1,200	Scottow, Norfolk	5th
Old Northamptonians	Sir Humphrey Cripps Pavilion		Northampton, Northamptonshire	4th
Shelford	The Davey Field	2,000 (150 seats)	Great Shelford, Cambridgeshire	8th
Southend Saxons	Warners Park	1,500 (150 seats)	Southend, Essex	9th
Sudbury	Whittome Field		Great Cornard, Sudbury, Suffolk	3rd
Tring	Pendley Sports Centre	750	Tring, Hertfordshire	7th
Westcliff	The Gables	1,000	Eastwood, Essex	Promoted from Regional 2 Anglia (champions)

Locations of the 2025–26 Regional 1 South East teams

=== League table ===
Regional 1 South East 2025–26
Pos	Team	Pld	W	D	L	PF	PA	PD	TB	LB	Pts	Qualification
1	Colchester (P)	22	21	0	1	909	461	+448	19	0	103	Promoted
2	Letchworth Garden City	22	17	1	4	874	554	+320	21	3	94	Promotion play-off
3	Tring	22	14	2	6	743	629	+114	16	2	78	Promotion play-off
4	Southend Saxons	22	12	0	10	666	762	−96	15	3	66	
5	Sudbury	22	10	0	12	691	677	+14	15	4	59	
6	North Walsham	22	11	1	10	563	619	−56	11	1	58	
7	Hertford	22	8	1	13	651	775	−124	17	3	54	
8	Old Northamptonians	22	7	0	15	640	648	−8	15	8	51	
9	Westcliff	22	9	0	13	611	617	−6	9	5	50	Relegation play-off
10	Amersham & Chiltern (R)	22	7	0	15	514	648	−134	10	5	43	Relegation play-off
11	Medway (R)	22	7	0	15	525	702	−177	13	2	43	Relegation place
12	Shelford (R)	22	6	1	15	508	803	−295	8	1	35	Relegation place

Updated to match(es) played on 11 April 2026. Source:
Rules for classification: If teams are level at any stage, tiebreakers are applied in the following order:
1. Number of matches won
2. Difference between points for and against
3. Total number of points for
4. Aggregate number of points scored in matches between tied teams
5. Number of matches won excluding the first match, then the second and so on until the tie is settled
  (P) Promoted; (R) Relegated

=== Play-offs ===
The champions are promoted to National 2 East while the winner of the Regional 1 South East promotion play-off meets the winner of the Regional 1 South Central promotion play-off in round 2. The winner of this match plays the 12th placed team of the National League 2 East with the winning team playing in next seasons National 2 East. In each match the highest placed team play at home.

Promotion play-offs
Round 1

25 April 2026

Letchworth Garden City (2nd)	41 – 36	Tring (3rd)
	Report

Legends Lane, Baldock Road, Letchworth

25 April 2026

London Scottish Lions (2nd)	33 – 40	Tunbridge Wells (3rd)
	Report

King's House Sports Ground, Chiswick

Round 2

2 May 2026

Letchworth Garden City (2nd)	32 – 43	Tunbridge Wells (3rd)
	Report

Legends Lane, Baldock Road, Letchworth

NLR Accession Final

9 May 2026

Henley Hawks	43 – 7	Tunbridge Wells
	Report

Dry Leas, Henley-on-Thames
Attendance: 810
Referee: Daniel Woods,

- Henley remain in National League 2 East.

Relegation play-off

25 April 2026

Westcliff (9th)	31 – 30	Amersham & Chiltern (10th)
	Report

The Gables, Eastwood

Regional 1 Accession Final

9 May 2026

Amersham & Chiltern (10th)	24 – 27	Old Colfeians
	Report

Weedon Lane, Amersham

- Amersham & Chiltern are relegated.

== Season 2024–25 ==
Departing were Colchester, promoted to National League 2 East whilst Rochford Hundred and Westcliff were relegated to Regional 2 Anglia. Joining were North Walsham, relegated from National League 2 East, together with Amersham & Chiltern and Southend Saxons, promoted from Regional 2 Thames and Regional 2 Anglia respectively.

=== Participating teams and locations ===
Team	Ground	Capacity	City/Area	Previous season
Amersham & Chiltern	Weedon Lane		Amersham, Buckinghamshire	Promoted from Regional 2 Thames (1st)
Bedford Athletic	Putnoe Woods	500	Bedford, Bedfordshire	10th
Harpenden	Redbourn Lane		Harpenden, Hertfordshire	3rd
Hertford	Highfields		Ware, Hertfordshire	7th
Letchworth Garden City	Legends Lane, Baldock Road		Letchworth, Hertfordshire	4th
North Walsham	Norwich Road	1,200	Scottow, Norfolk	Relegated from National League 2 East (14th)
Old Northamptonians	Sir Humphrey Cripps Pavilion		Northampton, Northamptonshire	9th
Oundle	Occupation Road	1,000	Oundle, Northamptonshire	6th
Shelford	The Davey Field	2,000 (150 seats)	Great Shelford, Cambridgeshire	5th
Southend Saxons	Warners Park	1,500 (150 seats)	Southend, Essex	Promoted from Regional 2 Anglia (1st)
Sudbury	Whittome Field		Great Cornard, Sudbury, Suffolk	2nd
Tring	Pendley Sports Centre	750	Tring, Hertfordshire	8th

Locations of the 2024–25 Regional 1 South East teams

=== League table ===
Regional 1 South East 2024–25
Pos	Team	Pld	W	D	L	PF	PA	PD	TB	LB	Pts	Qualification
1	Oundle (P)	22	22	0	0	1078	215	+863	21	0	109	Promoted
2	Letchworth Garden City	22	18	0	4	769	460	+309	19	2	93	
3	Sudbury	22	13	0	9	644	573	+71	14	3	69	
4	Old Northamptonians	22	12	1	9	584	663	−79	12	3	65	
5	North Walsham	22	10	2	10	576	502	+74	6	4	54	
6	Hertford	22	9	0	13	574	668	−94	13	4	53	
7	Tring	22	9	2	11	596	677	−81	10	2	52	
8	Shelford	22	9	1	12	507	487	+20	8	5	51	
9	Southend Saxons	22	9	0	13	571	736	−165	12	3	51	
10	Amersham & Chiltern	22	7	1	14	489	702	−213	10	3	43	
11	Harpenden (R)	22	5	1	16	507	861	−354	10	3	35	Relegated
12	Bedford Athletic (R)	22	5	0	17	538	889	−351	11	3	34	Relegated

Updated to match(es) played on 5 April 2025. Source:
Rules for classification: If teams are level at any stage, tiebreakers are applied in the following order:
1. Number of matches won
2. Difference between points for and against
3. Total number of points for
4. Aggregate number of points scored in matches between tied teams
5. Number of matches won excluding the first match, then the second and so on until the tie is settled
  (P) Promoted; (R) Relegated

== Season 2023–24 ==
Departing were Westcombe Park, promoted to National League 2 East whilst Medway and Sidcup were relegated to Regional 2 South East.

Joining were Rochford Hundred, relegated from National League 2 East, together with Letchworth Garden City and Old Northamptonians, promoted from Regional 2 Anglia and Regional 2 East Midlands respectively. Also coming in were Oundle on a level transfer from Regional 1 Midlands.

=== Participating teams and locations ===
Locations of the 2023–24 Regional 1 South East teams

Team	Ground	Capacity	City/Area	Previous season
Bedford Athletic	Putnoe Woods	500	Bedford, Bedfordshire	7th
Colchester	Raven Park	1,200	Colchester, Essex	3rd
Harpenden	Redbourn Lane		Harpenden, Hertfordshire	4th
Hertford	Highfields		Ware, Hertfordshire	9th
Letchworth Garden City	Legends Lane, Baldock Road		Letchworth, Hertfordshire	Promoted from Regional 2 Anglia (1st)
Old Northamptonians	Sir Humphrey Cripps Pavilion		Northampton, Northamptonshire	Promoted from Regional 2 East Midlands (1st)
Oundle	Occupation Road	1,000	Oundle, Northamptonshire	Transferred from Regional 1 Midlands (7th)
Rochford Hundred	The Rugby Park	1,000	Hawkwell, Rochford, Essex	Relegated from National League 2 East (13th)
Shelford	The Davey Field	2,000 (150 seats)	Great Shelford, Cambridgeshire	2nd
Sudbury	Whittome Field		Great Cornard, Sudbury, Suffolk	8th
Tring	Pendley Sports Centre	750	Tring, Hertfordshire	5th
Westcliff	The Gables	1,000	Eastwood, Essex	Relegated from National League 2 East (14th)

=== League table ===
Regional 1 South East 2023–24
Pos	Team	Pld	W	D	L	PF	PA	PD	TB	LB	Pts	Qualification
1	Colchester (C)	22	20	0	2	864	412	+452	21	1	102	Promoted
2	Sudbury	22	17	1	4	813	431	+382	15	2	87	
3	Harpenden	22	14	1	7	651	606	+45	11	1	70	
4	Letchworth Garden City	22	13	1	8	635	633	+2	14	1	69	
5	Shelford	22	12	0	10	654	596	+58	11	5	64	
6	Oundle	22	11	1	10	544	466	+78	9	4	59	
7	Hertford	22	9	1	12	515	603	−88	11	3	52	
8	Tring	22	10	0	12	600	626	−26	6	5	51	
9	Old Northamptonians	22	9	0	13	550	556	−6	10	5	51	
10	Bedford Athletic	22	6	0	16	549	776	−227	8	6	38	
11	Rochford Hundred (R)	22	5	0	17	482	842	−360	8	1	29	Relegated
12	Westcliff (R)	22	3	1	18	508	818	−310	6	3	23	Relegated

Updated to match(es) played on 6 April 2024. Source:
Rules for classification: If teams are level at any stage, tiebreakers are applied in the following order:
1. Number of matches won
2. Difference between points for and against
3. Total number of points for
4. Aggregate number of points scored in matches between tied teams
5. Number of matches won excluding the first match, then the second and so on until the tie is settled
  (C) Champion; (R) Relegated

=== Results ===
Home \ Away	BED	COL	HAR	HER	LET	OLN	OUN	ROC	SHE	SUD	TRI	WCL
Bedford Athletic	—	30–34	26–17	29–10	20–26	25–26	9–43	45–28	34–54	24–31	12–45	36–14
Colchester	31–13	—	43–19	43–12	38–36	36–10	46–10	46–10	38–10	52–12	57–39	57–15
Harpenden	62–32	27–26	—	35–17	38–29	24–14	27–20	49–28	32–27	12–40	20–17	52–16
Hertford	33–22	34–35	18–18	—	6–27	33–40	29–26	30–7	27–23	20–36	35–13	32–19
Letchworth Garden City	17–42	13–51	29–20	27–16	—	39–36	45–29	57–10	50–18	20–54	24–22	38–38
Old Northamptonians	32–7	27–40	13–22	36–6	26–35	—	28–26	31–37	34–29	29–33	17–19	45–21
Oundle	27–24	12–27	24–19	24–3	30–15	7–26	—	41–17	7–29	19–20	39–25	35–6
Rochford Hundred	25–27	7–66	34–45	47–40	15–25	26–15	17–27	—	20–37	21–31	31–55	27–18
Shelford	37–33	28–30	21–36	20–29	46–13	44–30	26–17	50–20	—	19–18	35–27	39–17
Sudbury	90–7	16–7	58–12	17–32	31–13	17–3	17–17	57–7	43–22	—	62–12	60–17
Tring	39–20	13–35	33–18	38–21	21–23	18–15	20–24	28–15	14–20	39–34	—	27–22
Westcliff	55–32	14–48	41–47	21–32	26–34	12–17	13–35	22–33	27–20	27–36	47–36	—

Updated to match(es) played on 6 April 2024. Source: Regional 1 South East
Legend: Blue = home team win; Yellow = draw; Red = away team win.

== 2022–23 ==
Six of the twelve teams participated in the 2021–22 competition. They are joined by Shelford, Sudbury, Colchester and Harpenden, all promoted from London 1 North, together with Medway and Bedford Athletic promoted from London 1 South and Midlands 1 East respectively. Sutton & Epsom, Maidenhead, Havant, Wimbledon and Brighton were level transferred to Regional 1 South Central. Other teams leaving the division were Dorking, Sevenoaks and North Walsham who were promoted to National League 2 East. There was no relegation from the league at the end of last season.

=== Participating teams and locations ===
Locations of the 2022–23 Regional 1 South East teams

Team	Ground	Capacity	City/Area	Previous season
Bedford Athletic	Putnoe Woods	500	Bedford, Bedfordshire	Promoted from Midlands 1 East (champions)
Colchester	Raven Park	1,200	Colchester, Essex	Promoted from London 1 North (3rd)
CS Rugby 1863	King's House Sports Ground		Chiswick, London	14th
Harpenden	Redbourn Lane		Harpenden, Hertfordshire	Promoted from London 1 North (4th)
Hertford	Highfields		Ware, Hertfordshire	4th
Medway	Priestfields		Rochester, Kent	Promoted from London 1 South (3rd)
Shelford	The Davey Field	2,000 (150 seats)	Great Shelford, Cambridgeshire	Promoted from London 1 North (champions)
Sidcup RFC	Crescent Farm		Sidcup, London	9th
Sudbury	Whittome Field		Great Cornard, Sudbury, Suffolk	Promoted from London 1 North (2nd)
Tring	Pendley Sports Centre	750	Tring, Hertfordshire	10th
Tunbridge Wells	St Marks Recreation Ground	3,000	Royal Tunbridge Wells, Kent	13th
Westcombe Park	Goddington Dene	3,200 (200 seats)	Orpington, London	6th

=== Final league table ===
Regional 1 South East 2022–23
Pos	Team	Pld	W	D	L	PF	PA	PD	TB	LB	Pts	Qualification
1	Westcombe Park (C)	22	18	0	4	814	385	+429	16	2	90	Promoted
2	Shelford	22	15	1	6	493	455	+38	7	3	72	
3	Colchester	22	12	1	9	576	508	+68	14	5	69	
4	Harpenden	22	12	2	8	558	478	+80	9	4	65	
5	Tring	22	12	1	9	532	528	+4	7	5	62	
6	Tunbridge Wells	22	12	0	10	503	487	+16	7	5	60	
7	Bedford Athletic	22	9	1	12	627	621	+6	8	6	52	
8	Sudbury	22	9	0	13	546	590	−44	10	4	50	
9	Hertford	22	9	0	13	446	513	−67	7	5	48	
10	CS Rugby 1863	22	9	0	13	468	575	−107	8	7	46 (Note: 5 points deducted)	
11	Sidcup	22	7	0	15	413	644	−231	2	5	35	Relegated
12	Medway	22	5	0	17	347	539	−192	0	6	26	Relegated

Updated to match(es) played on 3 May 2023. Source:
Rules for classification: If teams are level at any stage, tiebreakers are applied in the following order:
1. Number of matches won
2. Difference between points for and against
3. Total number of points for
4. Aggregate number of points scored in matches between tied teams
5. Number of matches won excluding the first match, then the second and so on until the tie is settled
  (C) Champion
  Notes:

=== Results ===
Home \ Away	BED	COL	CSR	HAR	HER	MED	SHE	SID	SUD	TRI	TUN	WCP
Bedford Athletic	—	24–50	30–23	24–23	101–21	45–15	29–15	40–22	22–10	22–28	10–12	29–62
Colchester	20–17	—	31–13	24–24	31–19	22–19	18–34	34–12	28–22	34–38	34–0	27–31
CS Rugby 1863	27–22	12–47	—	10–31	22–7	30–7	23–25	26–27	29–24	11–13	15–12	10–83
Harpenden	26–26	25–24	27–36	—	30–12	22–20	27–29	29–18	34–20	22–35	55–7	19–5
Hertford	35–30	43–12	18–19	22–15	—	19–7	21–14	51–15	40–24	29–5	10–28	3–24
Medway	15–20	16–23	29–24	20–21	20–15	—	21–38	12–27	22–12	6–14	22–17	15–33
Shelford	20–15	3–27	24–23	20–19	15–10	27–12	—	28–19	35–12	24–24	27–47	17–15
Sidcup	24–29	14–18	17–19	14–34	14–10	10–6	19–24	—	22–17	29–30	18–9	0–47
Sudbury	47–27	31–9	42–32	17–19	35–30	19–5	19–15	45–31	—	45–33	10–30	26–43
Tring	38–17	23–20	18–13	31–32	20–7	26–33	22–26	15–25	29–20	—	28–27	15–19
Tunbridge Wells	48–24	28–24	0–44	24–12	14–3	30–15	8–14	55–17	17–21	38–34	—	37–19
Westcombe Park	40–24	60–19	41–17	40–12	18–21	45–10	25–19	66–19	38–28	29–13	31–15	—

Updated to match(es) played on 25 March 2023. Source: Regional 1 South East
Legend: Blue = home team win; Yellow = draw; Red = away team win.
For upcoming matches, an "a" indicates there is an article about the rivalry between the two participants.

== 2021–22 ==
Nine of the fourteen teams participated in the 2019–20 competition. They are joined by Sutton & Epsom who were relegated from National League 2 South, along with three promoted sides; Havant, North Walsham and Westcombe Park. Maidenhead who played in South West Premier in 2019-20 were level transferred into London & South East Premier as the nearest club geographically to address an imbalance of teams in the league. Teams leaving the division included Rochford Hundred who were promoted into National League 2 South as champions along with Guernsey Raiders who won the virtual promotion play-off against Weston-super-Mare RFC, while teams relegated from the league included Bedford Athletic (Midlands 1 East), Guildford (London 1 South) and London Irish Wild Geese (London 1 South).

The teams competing in 2021–22 achieved their places in the league based on performances in 2019–20, the 'previous season' column in the table below refers to that season not 2020-21.

=== Participating teams and locations ===
Locations of the 2021–22 London & South East Premier teams

Team	Ground	Capacity	City/Area	Previous season
Brighton	Waterhall Playing Fields		Brighton, East Sussex	9th
CS Rugby 1863	King's House Sports Ground		Chiswick, London	11th
Dorking	The Big Field	1,000+	Dorking, Surrey	5th
Havant	Hook's Lane	1,500	Havant, Hampshire	Promoted from London 1 South (champions)
Hertford	Highfields		Ware, Hertfordshire	4th
Maidenhead	Braywick Park	1,750 (250 seats)	Maidenhead, Berkshire	Level transfer from South West Premier (3rd)
North Walsham	Norwich Road	1,200	Scottow, Norfolk	Promoted from London 1 North (champions)
Sevenoaks	Knole Paddock	1,000	Sevenoaks, Kent	7th
Sidcup	Crescent Farm		Sidcup, London	8th
Sutton & Epsom	Rugby Lane		Cheam, London	Relegated from National 2 South (14th)
Tring	Pendley Sports Centre	750	Tring, Hertfordshire	10th
Tunbridge Wells	St Marks Recreation Ground	3,000	Royal Tunbridge Wells, Kent	6th
Westcombe Park	Goddington Dene	3,200 (200 seats)	Orpington, London	Promoted from London 1 South (2nd)
Wimbledon	Beverley Meads	1,000	Raynes Park, London	3rd

=== Final league table ===
London & South East Premier 2021–22
Pos	Team	Pld	W	D	L	PF	PA	PD	TB	LB	Pts	Qualification
1	Sevenoaks (C)	26	23	0	3	862	318	+544	17	2	111	Promoted
2	Dorking	26	21	0	5	958	322	+636	18	4	107	Promoted
3	North Walsham	26	21	0	5	858	423	+435	18	2	104	Promoted
4	Hertford	26	19	1	6	797	406	+391	14	3	96	
5	Havant	26	18	0	8	685	473	+212	13	3	89	
6	Westcombe Park	26	15	0	11	720	603	+117	14	4	78	
7	Wimbledon	26	13	2	11	682	538	+144	10	3	69	
8	Maidenhead	26	10	0	16	613	709	−96	10	4	54	
9	Sidcup	26	11	1	14	502	772	−270	6	0	52	
10	Tring	26	9	1	16	560	792	−232	7	6	47 (Note: 5 points deducted)	
11	Sutton & Epsom	26	8	1	17	384	735	−351	5	3	44	
12	Brighton	26	6	0	20	456	849	−393	7	4	35	
13	Tunbridge Wells	26	4	0	22	405	898	−493	2	7	25	
14	CS Rugby 1863	26	1	0	25	252	896	−644	2	3	−11 (Note: 20 points deducted)	

Updated to match(es) played on 2 June 2022. Source:
Rules for classification: If teams are level at any stage, tiebreakers are applied in the following order:
1. Number of matches won
2. Difference between points for and against
3. Total number of points for
4. Aggregate number of points scored in matches between tied teams
5. Number of matches won excluding the first match, then the second and so on until the tie is settled
  (C) Champion
  Notes:

== 2020–21 ==
On 30 October the RFU announced that due to the coronavirus pandemic a decision had been taken to cancel Adult Competitive Leagues (National League 1 and below) for the 2020/21 season meaning London & South East Premier was not contested.

== 2019–20 ==
Nine of the fourteen teams participated in last season's competition. They are joined by Guernsey and London Irish Wild Geese who were relegated from National League 2 South, along with three promoted sides; Brighton, Rochford Hundred and Sevenoaks. Teams leaving the division included Sutton & Epsom who were promoted into National League 2 South as champions and Westcliff who won the promotion playoff, while teams relegated from the league included Brentwood, Chingford and Shelford (all London 1 North).

=== Participating teams ===
Locations of the 2019–20 London & South East Premier teams

Team	Ground	Capacity	City/Area	Previous season
Bedford Athletic	Putnoe Woods	500	Bedford, Bedfordshire	6th
Brighton	Waterhall Playing Fields		Brighton, East Sussex	Promoted from London 1 South (playoff)
CS Stags 1863	King's House Sports Ground		Chiswick, London	10th
Dorking	The Big Field	1,000+	Dorking, Surrey	9th
Guernsey Raiders	Footes Lane	5,000 (720 seats)	Saint Peter Port, Guernsey	Relegated from National 2 South (15th)
Guildford	Broadwater Sports Club		Farncombe, Surrey	11th
Hertford	Highfields		Ware, Hertfordshire	5th
London Irish Wild Geese	Hazelwood	2,000	Sunbury-on-Thames, Surrey	Relegated from National 2 South (16th)
Rochford Hundred	The Rugby Park	1,000	Hawkwell, Rochford, Essex	Promoted from London 1 North (champions)
Sevenoaks	Knole Paddock	1,000	Sevenoaks, Kent	Promoted from London 1 South (champions)
Sidcup	Crescent Farm		Sidcup, London	8th
Tring	Pendley Sports Centre	750	Tring, Hertfordshire	4th
Tunbridge Wells	St Marks Recreation Ground	3,000	Royal Tunbridge Wells, Kent	7th
Wimbledon	Beverley Meads	1,000	Raynes Park, London	3rd

=== Final league table ===
2019–20 London & South East Premier (to the date when play stopped due to COVID-19)
Pos	Team	Pld	W	D	L	PF	PA	PD	TB	LB	Pts
1	Guernsey (P)	22	20	0	2	753	305	+448	17	1	98
2	Rochford Hundred (C)	22	20	0	2	652	274	+378	16	2	98
3	Wimbledon	22	19	0	3	753	369	+384	18	1	95
4	Hertford	22	12	1	9	438	389	+49	8	5	63
5	Dorking	22	12	1	9	549	445	+104	7	3	60
6	Sevenoaks	22	10	3	9	362	421	−59	5	4	55
7	Tunbridge Wells	21	10	2	9	473	469	+4	8	2	54
8	Sidcup	22	10	0	12	466	600	−134	7	1	48
9	Brighton	22	8	2	12	429	521	−92	6	3	45
10	Tring	21	6	1	14	403	530	−127	5	5	36
11	CS Stags 1863	22	6	1	15	370	660	−290	6	3	35
12	London Irish Wild Geese (R)	22	6	0	16	404	491	−87	4	4	32
13	Bedford Athletic (R)	22	4	0	18	419	727	−308	6	5	27
14	Guildford (R)	22	4	1	17	326	596	−270	2	4	24

Updated to match(es) played on 28 July 2020. Source:

Final positions (with adjusted points)
Pos	Team	Pts^{*} (Note: On 4 April, the Rugby Football Union confirmed the final table for the season.)	Promotion or relegation
1	Rochford Hundred (C)	116.13	Promotion place
2	Guernsey (P) (Note: Due to the COVID-19 pandemic in the United Kingdom the promotion playoff game was cancelled and the winners were determined on final points tally.)	115.82	Promotion place
3	Wimbledon	112.29	
4	Hertford	74.45	
5	Dorking	70.85	
6	Tunbridge Wells	67.25	
7	Sevenoaks	66.30	
8	Sidcup	56.73	
9	Brighton	52.65	
10	Tring	44.79	
11	CS Stags 1863	41.36	
12	London Irish Wild Geese (R)	37.82	Relegation place
13	Bedford Athletic (R)	31.91	Relegation place
14	Guildford (R)	28.36	Relegation place

Updated to match(es) played on 28 July 2020. Source: "L&SE Premier" (PDF). England Rugby. Archived from the original (PDF) on 13 July 2020.

== 2018–19 ==
Nine of the fourteen teams participated in last season's competition. They are joined by Wimbledon who were relegated from National League 2 South, along with four promoted sides; Bedford Athletic, Brentwood, Chingford and CS Rugby 1863. Bedford Athletic had initially been promoted into Midlands Premier but were level transferred into London & South East Premier as the nearest club geographically to address an imbalance of teams in the league. Teams leaving the division included Barnes who were promoted into National League 2 South as champions along with Guernsey who won the promotion playoff, while teams relegated from the league included Southend Saxons (London 1 North), Towcestrians (Midlands 1 East) and Westcombe Park (London 1 South).

=== Participating teams ===
Locations of the 2018–19 London & South East Premier teams

Team	Ground	Capacity	City/Area	Previous season
Bedford Athletic	Putnoe Woods	500	Bedford, Bedfordshire	Promoted from Midlands 1 East (champions & level transfer)
Brentwood	King George's Playing Fields	3,000	Brentwood, Essex	Promoted from London 1 North (champions)
Chingford	Lea Valley Playing Fields		Chingford, London	Promoted from London 1 North (play-off)
CS Rugby 1863	King's House Sports Ground		Chiswick, London	Promoted from London 1 South (champions)
Dorking	The Big Field	1,000+	Dorking, Surrey	9th
Guildford	Broadwater Sports Club		Farncombe, Surrey	11th
Hertford	Highfields		Ware, Hertfordshire	4th
Shelford	The Davey Field	2,000 (150 seats)	Great Shelford, Cambridgeshire	7th
Sidcup	Crescent Farm		Sidcup, London	8th
Sutton & Epsom	Rugby Lane		Cheam, London	10th
Tring	Pendley Sports Centre	750	Tring, Hertfordshire	3rd
Tunbridge Wells	St Marks Recreation Ground	3,000	Royal Tunbridge Wells, Kent	5th
Westcliff	The Gables	1,000	Eastwood, Essex	6th
Wimbledon	Beverley Meads	1,000	Raynes Park, London	Relegated from National 2 South (15th)

=== Promotion play-off ===
Each season, the runners-up in the London & South East Premier (National League 3 London & South East) and South West Premier (formerly National League 3 South West) participate in a play-off for the third promotion place to National League 2 South. The team with the best playing record, in this case Westcliff, hosted the match and beat their opponents Barnstaple 44 – 5 to win promotion to National League 2 South for the first time. This was Westcliff's first appearance in the play-offs and Barnstaple's second; in 2016 Barnstaple beat Tonbridge Juddians 31 – 30 at Tonbridge. The home team have won fifteen out of nineteen play-off matches and the south-east team have won the play-off thirteen times.

Team	Pld	W	D	L	PF	PA	PD	TB	LB	Pts
Westcliff (P)	26	19	0	7	808	425	+383	17	5	98
Barnstaple	26	19	1	6	747	541	+206	12	1	91

27 April 2019

Westcliff	44 – 5	Barnstaple
	Westcliff

The Gables, Eastwood
Attendance: 750

== 2017–18 ==
Nine of the fourteen teams participated in last season's competition. They are joined by Barnes who were relegated from National League 2 South along with three promoted teams Sidcup, Tring and Tunbridge Wells. Tonbridge Juddians were promoted into National League 2 South as champions along with Wimbledon who won the promotion playoff. Teams relegated from the league included Amersham & Chiltern and Colchester (London 1 North) and Chichester (London 1 South). To address an imbalance of teams, Towcestrians were level transferred into the league from the Midlands Premier, as they were the nearest team geographically.

=== Participating teams ===
Locations of the 2017–18 London & South East Premier teams

Team	Ground	Capacity	City/Area	Previous season
Barnes	Barn Elms		Barnes, London	Relegated from National League 2 South (15th)
Dorking	The Big Field	1,000+	Dorking, Surrey	8th
Guernsey	Footes Lane	5,000 (720 seats)	Saint Peter Port, Guernsey	5th
Guildford	Broadwater Sports Club		Farncombe, Surrey	9th
Hertford	Highfields		Ware, Hertfordshire	3rd
Shelford	The Davey Field	2,000 (150 seats)	Great Shelford, Cambridgeshire	6th
Sidcup	Crescent Farm		Sidcup, London	Promoted from London 1 South (champions)
Southend Saxons	Warners Park	1,500 (150 seats)	Southend, Essex	11th
Sutton & Epsom	Rugby Lane		Cheam, London	10th
Towcestrians	Greens Norton Road		Towchester, Northamptonshire	Level transfer from Midlands Premier (10th)
Tring	Pendley Sports Centre	750	Tring, Hertfordshire	Promoted from London 1 North (champions)
Tunbridge Wells	St Marks Recreation Ground	3,000	Royal Tunbridge Wells, Kent	Promoted from London 1 South (playoffs)
Westcliff	The Gables	1,000	Eastwood, Southend-on-Sea, Essex	7th
Westcombe Park	Goddington Dene	3,200 (200 seats)	Orpington, London	4th

=== Final league table ===
2017–18 London & South East Premier
Pos	Team	Pld	W	D	L	PF	PA	PD	TB	LB	Pts	Promotion or relegation
1	Barnes (P)	26	22	0	4	944	380	+564	20	3	111	Promotion place
2	Guernsey (P)	26	22	0	4	962	446	+516	19	3	110	Play-off place
3	Tring	26	21	1	4	783	414	+369	16	3	105	
4	Hertford	26	20	1	5	896	484	+412	20	3	105	
5	Tunbridge Wells	26	14	0	12	681	557	+124	16	5	77	
6	Westcliff	26	14	0	12	816	555	+261	15	4	75	
7	Shelford	26	11	0	15	672	688	−16	12	3	59	
8	Sidcup	26	11	0	15	654	790	−136	11	4	59	
9	Dorking	26	10	1	15	646	725	−79	11	4	57	
10	Sutton & Epsom	26	10	0	16	634	875	−241	13	4	57	
11	Guildford	26	7	1	18	604	834	−230	15	7	52	
12	Westcombe Park (R)	26	9	1	16	511	759	−248	8	3	49	Relegation place
13	Southend Saxons (R)	26	5	0	21	458	1052	−594	6	4	30	Relegation place
14	Towcestrians (R)	26	3	1	22	386	1088	−702	5	1	20	Relegation place

Updated to match(es) played on 07 June 2018. Source: 2017-2018

=== Promotion play-off ===
Each season, the runners-up in the London & South East Premier, and South West Premier participate in a play-off for promotion to National League 2 South. The team with the best playing record, in this case Guernsey RFC, hosted the match and beat their opponents Bournemouth 38 – 23 to win promotion.

Team	Pld	W	D	L	PF	PA	PD	TB	LB	Pts
Guernsey (P)	26	22	0	4	962	446	+516	19	3	110
Bournemouth	26	17	1	8	761	635	+126	9	4	83

28 April 2018
15:00

Guernsey	38 – 23	Bournemouth
	Guernsey; Bournemouth

Footes Lane

== 2016–17 ==
Nine of the fourteen teams participated in last season's competition. They are joined by Dorking and Southend Saxons who were relegated from National 2 South while three promoted teams, Amersham & Chiltern, Guildford and Sutton & Epsom were promoted into the league. London Irish Wild Geese were promoted to National League 2 South as champions while Eton Manor and Gravesend were relegated to London 1 North and London 1 South respectively. Originally, Westcliff were supposed to go down as the 14th placed team, but they were granted a reprieve when East Grinstead (who had finished 3rd) decided to take voluntary relegation, due to the loss of a key sponsor and dropped five leagues to Sussex Spitfire 1. Finally Bracknell were level transferred back to National League 3 South West after just one season to address an imbalance in teams after having finished 11th.

Current results see:- National League 3 London & South East results

=== Participating teams ===
Locations of the 2016–17 London & South East Premier teams

Team	Ground	Capacity	City/Area	Previous season
Amersham & Chiltern	Weedon Lane		Amersham, Buckinghamshire	promoted from London 1 North (champions)
Chichester	Oaklands Park		Chichester, West Sussex	10th
Colchester	Mill Road Playing Fields		Colchester, Essex	9th
Dorking	The Big Field	1,000+	Dorking, Surrey	relegated from National League 2 South (14th)
Guernsey	Footes Lane	5,000 (720 seats)	Saint Peter Port, Guernsey	6th
Guildford	Broadwater Sports Club		Farncombe, Surrey	promoted from London 1 South (play-off)
Hertford	Highfields		Ware, Hertfordshire	4th
Shelford	The Davey Field	2,000 (150 seats)	Great Shelford, Cambridgeshire	7th
Southend Saxons	Warners Park	1,500 (150 seats)	Southend, Essex	relegated from National League 2 South (15th)
Sutton & Epsom	Rugby Lane		Cheam, London	promoted from London 1 South (champions)
Tonbridge Juddians	The Slade	1,500	Tonbridge, Kent	2nd (lost play-off)
Westcliff	The Gables	1,000	Eastwood, Southend-on-Sea, Essex	12th
Westcombe Park	Goddington Dene	3,200 (200 seats)	Orpington, London	5th
Wimbledon	Beverley Meads	1,000	Raynes Park, Merton, London	8th

=== Final league table ===
National League 3 London & South East 2016–17
Pos	Team	Pld	W	D	L	PF	PA	PD	TB	LB	Pts	Qualification
1	Tonbridge Juddians (P)	26	25	0	1	887	352	+535	20	0	120	Promotion place
2	Wimbledon (P)	26	23	0	3	936	399	+537	21	2	115	Play-off place
3	Hertford	26	17	0	9	726	471	+255	13	4	85	
4	Westcombe Park	26	17	0	9	719	392	+327	11	5	84	
5	Guernsey	26	15	0	11	756	618	+138	14	5	74	
6	Shelford	26	14	1	11	622	642	−20	8	1	67	
7	Westcliff	26	11	0	15	539	613	−74	7	6	57	
8	Dorking	26	11	1	14	553	663	−110	6	4	56	
9	Guildford	26	11	0	15	533	689	−156	7	3	54	
10	Sutton & Epsom	26	10	0	16	547	707	−160	5	6	51	
11	Southend	26	13	0	13	509	626	−117	6	2	50	
12	Chichester (R)	26	9	0	17	528	683	−155	9	7	47	Relegation place
13	Colchester (R)	26	4	0	22	465	791	−326	5	7	28	Relegation place
14	Amersham & Chiltern (R)	26	1	0	25	370	1045	−675	1	2	7	Relegation place

Updated to match(es) played on 26 April 2017. Source:

=== Promotion play-off ===
Each season, the runners-up in the National League 3 London and SE, and National League 3 South West participate in a play-off for promotion to National League 2 South. The team with the best playing record, in this case Wimbledon RFC, hosted the match and beat their opponents Dings Crusaders RFC 55 – 5 to win promotion.

Team	Pld	W	D	L	PF	PA	PD	TB	LB	Pts
Wimbledon (P)	26	23	0	3	936	399	+537	21	2	115
Dings Crusaders	26	19	0	7	676	448	+228	8	3	87

Updated to match(es) played on unknown. Source:

29 April 2017
15:00

Wimbledon	55 – 5	Dings Crusaders
	Wimbledon; Dings

Beverley Meads
Attendance: 350

== 2015–16 ==
=== Participating clubs ===
- Bracknell (from 3rd (National League 3 South-West)
- Chichester
- Colchester (promoted from London 1 North (champions))
- East Grinstead
- Eton Manor (promoted from London 1 North (play-off))
- Gravesend
- Guernsey
- Hertford
- London Irish Wild Geese
- Shelford (relegated from 2014–15 National League 2 South)
- Tonbridge Juddians
- Westcliff
- Westcombe Park
- Wimbledon (promoted from London 1 South (champions))

=== Final league table ===
2015–16 National League 3 London & SE Table
Pos	Team	Pld	W	D	L	PF	PA	PD	B	Pts	Qualification
1	London Irish Wild Geese (C)	26	21	4	1	791	442	+349	16	108	Promotion place
2	Tonbridge Juddians	26	21	1	4	833	395	+438	21	102	Play-off place
3	East Grinstead (R) (Note: Despite finishing 3rd in the league, East Grinstead decided to take voluntary relegation due to being left insolvent after their director (and financial backer) pulled out of the club. They will be relegated all the way down to level 10 (Sussex Intermediate League) giving a reprieve to Westcliff who would have been relegated in 12th position had it not been for East Grinstead's demotion.)	26	20	1	5	687	337	+350	17	99	Relegation place
4	Hertford	26	18	1	7	749	431	+318	15	89	
5	Westcombe Park	26	17	1	8	738	421	+317	17	87	
6	Guernsey	26	15	0	11	666	592	+74	16	76	
7	Shelford	26	14	0	12	597	542	+55	17	73	
8	Wimbledon	26	13	0	13	635	492	+143	12	64	
9	Colchester	26	12	0	14	567	616	−49	11	59	
10	Chichester	26	10	0	16	484	609	−125	12	52	
11	Bracknell	26	9	0	17	478	702	−224	10	46	
12	Westcliff (Note: Following East Grinsteads voluntary relegation, 12th placed Westcliff were granted a reprieve and would not be relegated this season.)	26	5	0	21	427	814	−387	8	28	
13	Gravesend (R)	26	3	0	23	378	809	−431	8	20	Relegation place
14	Eton Manor (R)	26	0	0	26	277	1105	−828	5	5	Relegation place

Updated to match(es) played on 23 April 2016. Source: 2015-16

=== Promotion play-off ===
The runners-up in the National League 3 London and SE, and National League 3 South West participate in a play-off for promotion to National League 2 South. The team with the best playing record, in this case Tonbridge Juddian, host the match and their opponents are Barnstaple. Juddians lost the match 31 – 30 to a penalty in the last minute of the match and will stay in National 3 London and SE for next season.

Team	Pld	W	D	L	PF	PA	PD	TB	LB	Pts
Tonbridge Juddian	26	21	1	4	833	395	+438	13	2	102
Barnstaple (P)	26	20	2	4	715	378	+337	12	2	98

Updated to match(es) played on unknown. Source:

30 April 2016
15:00

Tonbridge Juddian	30 – 31	Barnstaple
	Juddians; Barnstaple

The Slade
Attendance: 600

== 2014–15 ==
=== Participating clubs ===
- Amersham & Chiltern (transferred from National 3 South West)
- Barnes
- Bury St Edmunds
- Chichester (promoted from London 1 South)
- CS Rugby 1863
- East Grinstead
- Gravesend (promoted from London 1 South)
- Guernsey
- Hertford
- London Irish Wild Geese (relegated from National 2 South)
- Tonbridge Juddians
- Tring
- Westcliff (promoted from London 1 North)
- Westcombe Park

=== Final league table ===
2014–15 National League 3 London & SE Table
Pos	Team	Pld	W	D	L	PF	PA	PD	B	Pts	Qualification
1	Bury St Edmunds (C)	26	20	0	6	800	401	+399	18	98	Promotion place
2	Barnes (P)	26	19	0	7	638	492	+146	15	91	Play-off place
3	London Irish Wild Geese	26	19	0	7	681	524	+157	14	90	
4	East Grinstead	26	16	0	10	599	429	+170	14	73	
5	Westcombe Park	26	14	0	12	630	473	+157	22	78	
6	Hertford	26	14	0	12	615	565	+50	12	68	
7	Chichester	26	12	1	13	547	612	−65	13	63	
8	Tonbridge Juddians	26	11	1	14	582	591	−9	15	61	
9	Gravesend	26	11	1	14	509	614	−105	9	55	
10	Guernsey	26	11	0	15	617	650	−33	14	53	
11	Westcliff	26	9	0	17	516	681	−165	12	48	
12	Tring (R)	26	9	1	16	500	695	−195	10	48	Relegation place
13	Amersham & Chiltern (R)	26	9	0	17	489	610	−121	11	47	Relegation place
14	CS Rugby 1863 (R)	26	6	0	20	481	867	−386	11	35	Relegation place

Updated to match(es) played on 7 October 2015. Source: 2014-15

=== Promotion play-off ===
The runners-up in the National League 3 London and SE, and National League 3 South West participate in a play-off for promotion to National League 2 South. The team with the best playing record, in this case Exmouth, hosts the match; their opponents were Barnes and the match was played on 25 April 2015. At the end of full-time the match score was 22 – 22, and Barnes scored the only points in extra-time, to win the match 27– 22.

Team	Pld	W	D	L	PF	PA	PD	TB	LB	Pts
Exmouth	26	21	0	5	820	426	+394	13	2	99
Barnes (P)	26	19	0	7	638	492	+146	13	2	91

25 April 2015
14:30

Exmouth	22 – 27	Barnes

Imperial Recreation Ground
Attendance: 1,000

After extra time (80 mins: 22 – 22)

== 2013–14 ==
=== Participating clubs ===
- Barking (relegated from National League 2 South)
- Barnes
- Basingstoke (promoted from London 1 South)
- Bury St Edmunds (promoted from London 1 North)
- CS Rugby 1863
- Dorking
- East Grinstead (promoted from London 1 South)
- Guernsey
- Hertford
- Old Elthamians
- Thurrock
- Tonbridge Juddians
- Tring
- Westcombe Park

=== Final league table ===
2013–14 National League 3 London & SE Table
Pos	Team	Pld	W	D	L	PF	PA	PD	B	Pts	Promotion or relegation
1	Dorking (C)	26	22	1	3	1048	384	+664	21	111	Promotion place
2	Old Elthamians (P)	26	22	2	2	961	376	+585	19	111	Play-off place
3	East Grinstead	26	19	1	6	792	379	+413	17	95	
4	Tonbridge Juddian	26	17	2	7	712	583	+129	13	85	
5	Guernsey	26	15	1	10	733	487	+246	17	79	
6	Tring	26	14	0	12	667	574	+93	14	70	
7	Bury St Edmunds	26	13	1	12	729	687	+42	16	70	
8	Hertford	26	13	1	12	645	557	+88	14	68	
9	CS Rugby 1863	26	10	3	13	622	695	−73	14	60	
10	Westcombe Park	26	11	0	15	611	649	−38	11	55	
11	Barnes	26	9	0	17	519	790	−271	15	51	
12	Basingstoke (R)	26	7	1	18	583	838	−255	13	43	Relegation place
13	Thurrock (R)	26	3	1	22	441	1016	−575	6	20	Relegation place
14	Barking (R)	26	0	0	26	329	1377	−1048	6	6	Relegation place

Updated to match(es) played on 20 May 2014. Source:

== 2012–13 ==
=== Participating clubs ===
- Barnes (relegated from National League 2 South)
- Bishop's Stortford
- CS Rugby 1863
- Dorking
- Gravesend
- Guernsey (promoted from London 1 South)
- Hertford
- Old Elthamians (promoted from London 1 South)
- Staines
- Thurrock (promoted from London 1 North)
- Tonbridge Juddians
- Tring
- Westcliff
- Westcombe Park

=== Results ===
- 1 Bishop's Stortford Promoted
- 2 Dorking
- 3 Westcombe Park
- 4 Barnes
- 5 Tonbridge Juddians
- 6 Old Elthamians
- 7 CS Rugby 1863
- 8 Guernsey
- 9 Hertford
- 10 Tring
- 11 Thurrock
- 12 Gravesend Relegated
- 13 Westcliff Relegated
- 14 Staines Relegated

== 2011–12 ==
=== Participating clubs ===
- Ampthill
- Bishop's Stortford
- Bracknell
- Canterbury (relegated from National League 2 South)
- CS Rugby 1863
- Dorking
- Gravesend
- Havant
- London Irish Amateur (promoted from London 1 South)
- Luton
- Staines
- Tonbridge Juddian (promoted from London 1 South)
- Tring
- Westcliff (promoted from London 1 North)

=== Results ===
- 1 Canterbury Promoted
- 2 Tonbridge Juddian
- 3 Ampthill Transferred
- 4 Bishop's Stortford
- 5 Dorking
- 6 CS Rugby 1863
- 7 Tring
- 8 Staines
- 9 London Irish Amateur
- 10 Westcliff
- 11 Gravesend
- 12 Bracknell Relegated
- 13 Luton Relegated
- 14 Havant Relegated

== 2010–11 ==
=== Participating clubs ===
- Ampthill
- Barnes (relegated from National League 2 South)
- Basingstoke
- Bishop's Stortford
- Bracknell
- Civil Service (promoted from London 1 North)
- Diss
- Dorking
- Gravesend (promoted from London 1 South)
- Havant
- Hertford
- North Walsham
- Staines (promoted from London 1 North)
- Tring

== 2009–10 ==
=== Participating clubs ===
First season as a national league

- Basingstoke
- Bishop's Stortford
- Bracknell
- Diss
- Dorking
- Havant
- Haywards Heath
- Hertford
- Jersey
- North Walsham
- Old Albanians
- Portsmouth
- Sutton & Epson
- Tring

== Original teams ==
When league rugby began in 1987 this division (known as London 1) contained the following teams:

- Dartfordians
- Ealing
- Esher
- Guildford & Godalming (Note: Guildford & Godalming would merge with Old Guildfordians in 2003 to form Guildford Rugby Club.)
- Ipswich
- Lewes
- Old Gaytonians (Note: Gaytonians would later merge with Kingsburians and Roxeth Manor to form West London RFC.)
- Ruislip
- Sutton & Epsom
- Upper Clapton (Note: Upper Clapton are currently known as Epping Upper Clapton RFC.)
- United Services Portsmouth

== Regional 1 South East honours ==
In the first season of the English rugby union league pyramid, sponsored by Courage, there was four, tier five leagues. These were London Division 1, Midland Division 1, North Division 1 and South West Division 1. In 1987 the geographical area for teams in the south-east of England was known as the London and South East Division and covered the counties of Essex, Hampshire, Kent, Middlesex, Norfolk, Suffolk, Surrey and Sussex. The league was also known as London League 1 and London 1. There were eleven teams in the league and they played each team once, giving each team ten matches. This system prevailed for five seasons, and in 1992–93 the number of teams increased from eleven to thirteen. The following season (1993–94) the league was reorganised and the four tier five leagues became two; National 5 North and National 5 South. After three seasons, in 1996–97, a further reorganisation occurred, and there was a return to four, tier five leagues; with London Division One covering the same area as before. This system prevailed until 2009–10 when the number of teams was increased from twelve to fourteen and renamed National League Three London & South East. The league name changed once more for the 2017–18, when it was renamed to London & South East Premier.

=== London Division One (1987–93) ===
The original London Division One was a tier five league with promotion up to Area League 2 South and relegation down to either London 2 North or London 2 South.

London Division One
Season	No of teams	No of matches	Champions	Runners-up	Relegated teams	Reference
1987–88	11	10	Ealing	Ruislip	Esher, Upper Clapton	
1988–89	11	10	Basingstoke	Sutton & Epsom	Guildford & Godalming, Dartfordians	
1989–90	11	10	North Walsham	Ealing	No relegation	
1990–91	11	10	Sidcup	Cheshunt	US Portsmouth	
1991–92	11	10	Thurrock	Eton Manor	Cheshunt, Ruislip, Lewes	
1992–93	13	12	Tabard	Ealing	Barking, Old Colfeians, Old Mid-Whitgiftian, Old Alleynian, Dorking, Old Gaytonians, Sidcup	

=== London Division One ===
The top six teams from London Division One and the top six from South West Division One were combined to create National 5 South. London Division 1 was now the name of a tier six league and was one of two feeder leagues for National 5 South.

London 1
Season	No of teams	No of matches	Champions	Runners-up	Relegated teams	Reference
1993–94	13	12	Barking	Ealing	Thurrock, Dorking, Old Alleynian	
1994–95	13	12	Camberley	Esher	Streatham-Croydon, Eton Manor, Maidstone	
1995–96	13	12	Charlton Park	Southend	Ealing	

=== London Division One ===
For the end of the 1995–96 season National 5 South was discontinued and London Division One returned to being a tier five league. Promotion was to National 4 South (renamed to National 3 South in 2000–01), while relegation continued to London 2 North and London 2 South.

London Division One
Season	No of teams	No of matches	Champions	Runners-up	Relegated teams	Reference
1996–97	14	13	Esher	Norwich	Southend, Thurrock	
1997–98	17	16	Norwich	Staines	Askeans	
1998–99	17	16	Westcombe Park	Staines	Southend, Charlton Park	
1999–00	17	16	Basingstoke	Staines	Cheshunt, Sudbury, Old Mid-Whitgiftian, Wimbledon, Ruislip, Woodford	(Note: The reduction of this division from 17 teams to 12 resulted in more relegation places than is usual.)
2000–01	11	20	Old Colfeians	Havant	Guildford & Godalming, Thurrock	(Note: Metropolitan Police withdrew and their fixtures and results expunged.)
2001–02	12	22	Havant	Basingstoke	Cambridge	
2002–03	12	22	Southend	Haywards Heath	Cheshunt, Northwich, Winchester	
2003–04	12	22	Havant	Hertford	Harlow, Camberley, Staines	
2004–05	12	22	Cambridge	Worthing	Thanet Wanderers, Sutton & Epsom, London Nigerian	
2005–06	12	22	Canterbury	Richmond	Tabard, Old Colfeians	
2006–07	12	22	London Scottish	Ealing Trailfinders	Guildford, Haywards Heath, Staines	
2007–08	12	22	Richmond	Worthing	Thanet Wanderers, Basingstoke, CS Rugby 1863	
2008–09	12	22	Shelford	Barnes	No relegation	

=== National League 3 London & SE ===
The division was renamed National League 3 London & SE following a restructuring of the national leagues which led to changes at all levels. It continued as a tier 5 league with promotion to National League 2 South (formerly National 3 South) and relegation to either London 1 North or London 1 South (formerly London 2 North and London 2 South).

National League 3 London & South East
Season	No of teams	No of matches	Champions	Runners-up	Relegated teams	Reference
2009–10	14	26	Jersey	Old Albanian	Haywards Heath, Portsmouth, Sutton & Epsom	
2010–11	14	26	Barnes	Hertford	Diss, North Walsham, Basingstoke	
2011–12	14	26	Canterbury	Tonbridge Juddian	Havant, Luton, Bracknell	
2012–13	14	26	Bishop's Stortford	Dorking	Staines, Westcliff, Gravesend	
2013–14	14	26	Dorking	Old Elthamians	Barking, Thurrock, Basingstoke	
2014–15	14	26	Bury St Edmunds	Barnes	CS Rugby 1863, Amersham & Chiltern, Tring	
2015–16	14	26	London Irish Wild Geese	Tonbridge Juddians	Eton Manor, Gravesend, East Grinstead (Note: Despite finishing 3rd in the league, East Grinstead decided to take voluntary relegation due to being left insolvent after their director (and financial backer) pulled out of the club. The will be relegated all the way down to level 10 (Sussex Intermediate League) giving a reprieve to Westcliff who would have been relegated in 12th position had it not been for East Grinstead's demotion.)	
2016–17	14	26	Tonbridge Juddians	Wimbledon	Amersham & Chiltern, Colchester, Chichester	
Green background are the promotion places.

=== London & South East Premier ===
The division was renamed London & South East Premier in order to make it more obvious that it was a regional league and the pinnacle of the London & South East region. It continued to be a tier 5 league with promotion to National League 2 South and relegation to London 1 North or London 1 South.

London & South East Premier
Season	No of teams	No of matches	Champions	Runners-up	Relegated teams	Reference
2017–18	14	26	Barnes	Guernsey	Towcestrians, Southend Saxons, Westcombe Park	
2018–19	14	26	Sutton & Epsom	Westcliff	Shelford, Brentwood, Chingford	
2019–20	14	22 (Note: Due to the COVID-19 pandemic in the United Kingdom the RFU cancelled all rugby below the Premiership with most clubs in London & South East Premier having played 22 games, and a best playing record formula was used to decide the final table.)	Rochford Hundred	Guernsey	Guildford, Bedford Athletic, London Irish Wild Geese	
2020–21	14	26	Cancelled due to the COVID-19 pandemic in the United Kingdom.			
2021–22	14	26	Sevenoaks	Dorking	North Walsham (also promoted). No relegation due to league reorganisation.	
Green background are the promotion places.

=== Regional 1 South East ===
Following a reorganisation of the league structure by the RFU, this league is now one of six at tier 5. Promotion is to National League 2 East and relegation to either Regional 2 Anglia, Regional 2 South East or Regional 2 Thames depending on location.

Regional 1 South East
Season	No of teams	No of matches	Champions	Runners-up	Relegated teams	Reference
2022–23	12	22	Westcombe Park	Shelford	CS Rugby 1863, Sidcup and Medway	
2023–24	12	22	Colchester	Sudbury	Rochford Hundred and Westcliff	
2024–25	12	22	Oundle	Letchworth Garden City	Harpenden and Bedford Athletic	
2024–25	12	22	Colchester	Letchworth Garden City	to be confirmed	
Green background is the promotion place.

== Promotion play-offs ==
Between seasons 2000–01 and 2018–19 there has been a play-off between the runners-up of London & South East Premier and South West Premier for the third and final promotion place to National League 2 South. The team with the superior league record has home advantage. At the end of the 2019–20 season the London and south-east teams have been the most successful with thirteen wins to the south-west teams six; and the home team has won promotion on fifteen occasions compared to the away teams four.

London & South East Premier v South West Premier promotion play-off results
Season	Home team	Score	Away team	Venue	Attendance	Reference
2000–01	Cinderford (SW)	26–10	Havant (LSE)	Dockham Road, Cinderford, Gloucestershire		
2001–02	Basingstoke (LSE)	29–13	Dings Crusaders (SW)	Down Grange, Basingstoke, Hampshire		
2002–03	Haywards Heath (LSE)	34–21	Reading (SW)	Whiteman's Green, Cuckfield, West Sussex		
2003–04	Hertford (LSE)	25–14	Cinderford (SW)	Highfields, Ware, Hertfordshire		
2004–05	Worthing Raiders (LSE)	26–30	Bridgwater & Albion (SW)	Roundstone Lane, Angmering, West Sussex	1,200	
2005–06	Richmond (LSE)	3–12	Clifton (SW)	Athletic Ground, Richmond, Greater London	1,100	
2006–07	Ealing Trailfinders (LSE)	48–16	Cleve (SW)	Trailfinders Sports Ground, Ealing, Greater London		
2007–08	Worthing Raiders (LSE)	18–5	Bracknell (SW)	Roundstone Lane, Angmering, West Sussex		
2008–09	Barnes (LSE)	39–18	Bracknell (SW)	Barn Elms, Barnes, Greater London		
2009–10	Old Albanian (LSE)	15–0	Old Patesians (SW)	Woollam Playing Fields, St Albans, Hertfordshire		
2010–11	Hertford (LSE)	23–22	Bournemouth (SW)	Highfields, Ware, Hertfordshire	1,000	
2011–12	Chinnor (SW)	19–8	Tonbridge Juddians (LSE)	Kingsey Road, Thame, Oxfordshire		
2012–13	Exmouth (SW)	21–20	Dorking (LSE)	Imperial Recreation Ground, Exmouth, Devon		
2013–14	Old Elthamians (LSE)	17–10	Redingensians (SW)	Foxbury Avenue, Chislehurst, Kent	1,350	
2014–15	Exmouth (SW)	22–27 (aet)	Barnes (LSE)	Imperial Recreation Ground, Exmouth, Devon	1,000	
2015–16	Tonbridge Juddians (LSE)	30–31	Barnstaple (SW)	The Slade, Tonbridge, Kent	600	
2016–17	Wimbledon (LSE)	55–5	Dings Crusaders (SW)	Beverley Meads, Raynes Park, Greater London	350	
2017–18	Guernsey (LSE)	38–23	Bournemouth (SW)	Footes Lane, Saint Peter Port, Guernsey		
2018–19	Westcliff (LSE)	44–5	Barnstaple (SW)	The Gables, Eastwood, Essex	750	
2019–20	Cancelled due to COVID-19 pandemic in the United Kingdom. Best ranked runner up – Guernsey (LSE) – promoted instead.					
2020–21	Cancelled due to the COVID-19 pandemic in the United Kingdom.					
2021–22	Cancelled due to the reorganisation of the league					
Green background is the promoted team. (LSE = London & South East teams while SW = South West teams).

== Number of league titles ==
- Barnes (2)
- Basingstoke (2)
- Canterbury (2)
- Colchester (2)
- Havant (2)
- Westcombe Park (2)
- Barking (1)
- Bishop's Stortford (1)
- Bury St Edmunds (1)
- Camberley (1)
- Cambridge (1)
- Charlton Park (1)
- Dorking (1)
- Ealing (1)
- Esher (1)
- Jersey (1)
- London Irish Wild Geese
- London Scottish (1)
- London Welsh (1) (Note: London Welsh's league title was won during the period when tier 5 was divided into 2 regional divisions - National 5 North and National 5 South (1993-96).)
- North Walsham (1)
- Norwich (1)
- Old Colfeians (1)
- Richmond (1)
- Rochford Hundred (1)
- Sevenoaks (1)
- Shelford (1)
- Sidcup (1)
- Southend (1)
- Sutton & Epsom (1)
- Tabard
- Thurrock (1)
- Tonbridge Juddians (1)

== See also ==
- London & SE Division RFU
- English rugby union system
- Rugby union in England
