= Shelford =

Shelford may refer to:

Places

- Shelford, Nottinghamshire, village in Nottinghamshire, England
- Shelford, Victoria, Australia
- Shelford, Warwickshire, location in England
- Great Shelford, village in Cambridgeshire, England
- Little Shelford, village in Cambridgeshire, England
- Shelford Priory, priory in Nottinghamshire, England
- Shelford railway station, in Cambridgeshire, England
- Shelford Girls' Grammar, a private school for girls in Caulfield, Victoria, Australia

Sports teams

- Shelford Rugby Club, rugby union side based in Great Shelford, Cambridgeshire

Given names

- Shelford Bidwell (1848–1909), English physicist and inventor

Family names:

- Adrian Shelford, New Zealand rugby league footballer
- Angus Shelford (b. 1976), New Zealand boxer
- Buck Shelford (b. 1957), New Zealand rugby player
- Cyril Morley Shelford (1921 - 2001), Canadian politician, Minister of Agriculture of British Columbia
- Kelly Shelford, New Zealand rugby league footballer
- Robert Walter Campbell Shelford (1872–1912), British entomologist, museum administrator, and naturalist
- Victor Ernest Shelford (1877–1968), American zoologist

== See also ==
- Scalford
- Shalford (disambiguation)
