= Chadwell, Leicestershire =

Village in England

Coordinates: 52.8132160°N 0.8408313°W

Chadwell
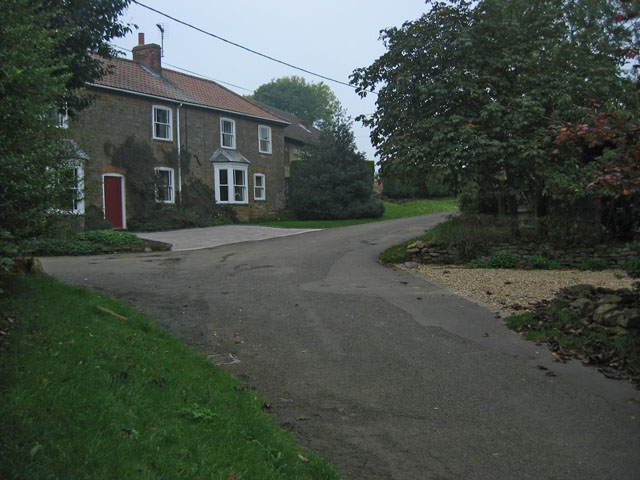
- Chadwell, Leicestershire

- Location within Leicestershire
- Population: 34 (2011)
- OS grid reference: SK781246
  - London: 109.3 mi (175.9 km)
- Civil parish: Scalford
- District: Melton
- Shire county: Leicestershire
- Region: East Midlands
- Country: England
- Sovereign state: United Kingdom
- Post town: Melton Mowbray
- Postcode district: LE14
- Dialling code: 01664
- Police: Leicestershire
- Fire: Leicestershire
- Ambulance: East Midlands
- UK Parliament: Melton and Syston
- Website: Scalford Parish Council

Chadwell is a small village in the district of Melton, which is approximately 4 miles (6.4 km) northeast of Melton Mowbray in Leicestershire, and is part of the civil parish of Scalford, which also includes the neighbouring hamlet of Wycomb. Until 1 April 1936 it was in the parish of Wycomb and Chadwell. The village name (originally recorded as Caudwell) means 'spring/stream which is cold'. Chadwell is half a mile east of Wycomb, and they share the Church of St. Mary in the same ecclesiastical parish. The Church of St Mary is a Grade II* listed building.

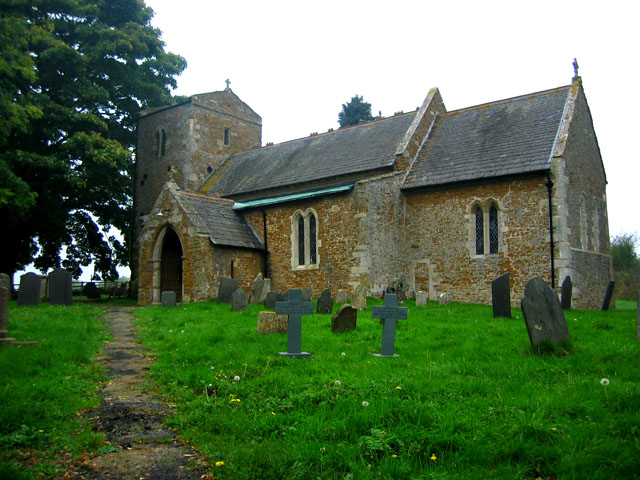
St Mary's Church at Chadwell

== History ==
Mentioned in the Domesday Book Survey of 1086, Chadwell was a settlement in the Hundred of Framland, Leicestershire. It had an estimate recorded population of 23 households in 1086. The Church of St Mary, started out as a chapel, with parts of the structure dating back to the 12th century. Not long after the Inclosure Act 1773, it was recorded that 750 acres of land in and around "Caudwell and Wykeham" belonged to the "Parish of Rodeley". Among the parish landowners, influential figures included the lord of the manor, Thomas Babington, esq., the Bishop of Ely and the Brethren of Wigston's Hospital. in 1790, the Church of St Mary was still listed as a chapel, but the two settlements, and their surrounding 750 acres, were considered an outlier of East-Goscote Hundred, within the Hundred of Framland. By 1879, the Waltham branch of the Great Northern Railway ran between the two settlements, adding a railway station on the western end of the village. It was by this point, the Church of St Mary was identified as a church. Other listed buildings and structures in the village include: Spring Cottage, Manor Farmhouse, and two Chest Tomb's located a few metres south of the southern porch of the Church of St Mary; all are Grade II Listed.

== Geography ==
The village is situated on Oadby Member Till that is underpinned by three bands of Middle Jurassic bedrock geology formations; from the approach into the village from the west is Whitby Mudstone (pale-grey mudstone, 174-183 million years old), followed by Marlstone Rock (Iron-grainstone, 174-191 million years old), then after the church it is Dyrham Formation (grey siltstone, 183-191 million years old). The superficial deposits of the Oadby Member Till give way to colluvium and alluvial river deposits as you head down towards the stream.
