= Wycomb =

Village in United Kingdom

Coordinates: 52.8160508°N 0.8529732°W

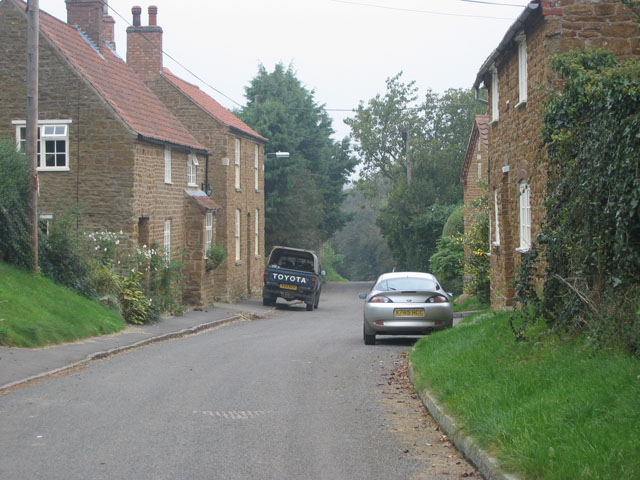
- Pickards Lane, Wycomb (2005)

- Location within Leicestershire
- Population: 55 (2011)
- OS grid reference: SK774248
  - London: 109 mi (175 km)
- Civil parish: Scalford
- District: Melton
- Shire county: Leicestershire
- Region: East Midlands
- Country: England
- Sovereign state: United Kingdom
- Post town: Melton Mowbray
- Postcode district: LE14
- Dialling code: 01664
- Police: Leicestershire
- Fire: Leicestershire
- Ambulance: East Midlands
- UK Parliament: Melton and Syston
- Website: Scalford Parish Council

Wycomb is a small hamlet in the district of Melton, which is approximately 4 miles (6.4 km) northeast of Melton Mowbray in Leicestershire, and is part of the civil parish of Scalford, which also includes the neighbouring village of Chadwell. Until 1 April 1936 it was in the parish of Wycomb and Chadwell.

The settlement name (originally recorded as Wykeham) means 'wīc-hām (Old English) A settlement associated with a Roman 'vicus'. Wycomb is half a mile west of Chadwell, and Wycomb has traditionally used Chadwell's church. The Church of St Mary is a Grade II* Listed building.

== History ==
Mentioned in the Domesday Book Survey of 1086, Wycomb was a settlement in the Hundred of Framland, Leicestershire. It had an estimated population of 23 households in 1086. Not long after the Inclosure Act 1773, it was recorded that the 750 acres of land in and around "Caudwell and Wykeham" belonged to the "Parish of Rodeley". Among the parish landowners, influential figures included the lord of the manor, Thomas Babington, esq., the Bishop of Ely and the Brethren of Wigston's Hospital. In 1795, the two settlements, and their surrounding 750 acres of farmland, were considered to be part of East-Goscote Hundred, making it an outlier within the surrounding Hundred of Framland. By 1879, the Waltham branch of the Great Northern Railway ran between the two settlements, adding a railway station on the eastern road out towards Chadwell. Listed buildings in Wycomb include: The Homestead – an 18th century Ironstone built cottage, and Stowleigh – a former farmhouse built in 1850. Both buildings are Grade II Listed.

== Geography ==
Wycomb is situated on two Middle Jurassic bedrock geology Formations. Most of the settlement is on Marlstone Rock (Iron-grainstone, 174-191 million years old), and as you go down the valley towards the northeast, it gives way to Dyrham Formation (grey siltstone, 183-191 million years old) with bands of Sandrock. Colluvial and alluvial river deposits overlie the bedrock along ancient watercourses, as you head towards the stream.
