= Scalford =

Village in Leicestershire, England

Coordinates: 52.80971°N 0.869884°W

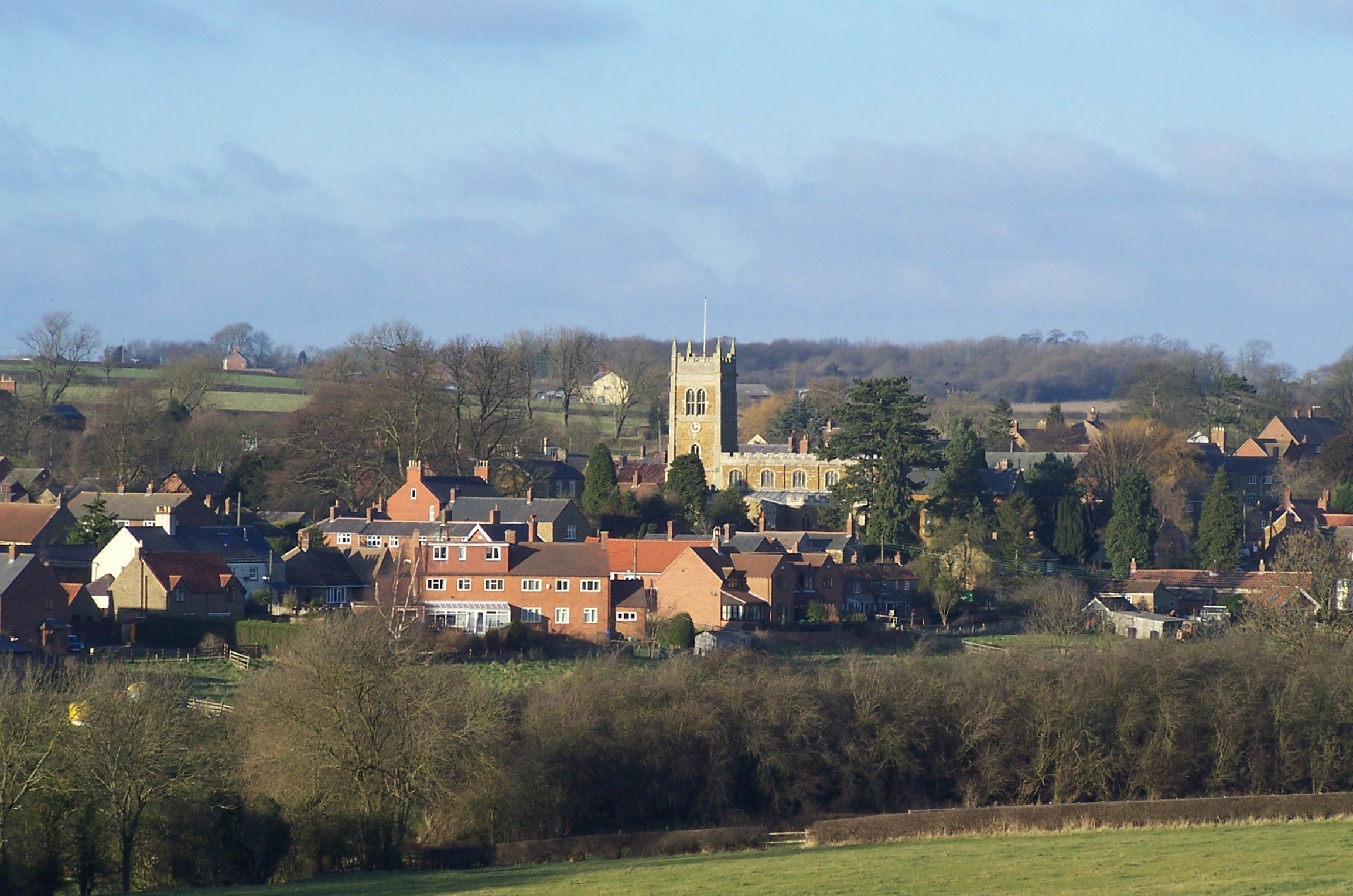
- Scalford from the South

- Location within Leicestershire
- Population: 608 (2011)
- OS grid reference: SK762241
  - London: 109 mi (175 km)
- Civil parish: Scalford
- District: Melton
- Shire county: Leicestershire
- Region: East Midlands
- Country: England
- Sovereign state: United Kingdom
- Post town: Melton Mowbray
- Postcode district: LE14
- Dialling code: 01664
- Police: Leicestershire
- Fire: Leicestershire
- Ambulance: East Midlands
- UK Parliament: Melton and Syston
- Website: Scalford Parish Council

Scalford is a village and civil parish in the Melton borough of Leicestershire, England. It lies 4 miles (6.4 km) to the north of Melton Mowbray at the southern end of the Vale of Belvoir. In the 2011 census the parish (including Chadwell and Wycomb) had a population of 608.

== Etymology ==
The name of the village is derived from Old English and originally meant shallow ford. It has retained its current spelling for at least 440 years, being shown as 'Scalford' on the map of Warwickshire and Leicestershire produced (in Latin) in 1576 by Christopher Saxton as part of his Atlas of England and Wales. The name is partly due to Old Norse influence, as the village lies in the former Danelaw; it is identical in meaning to Shalford and Shelford.

== Churches ==
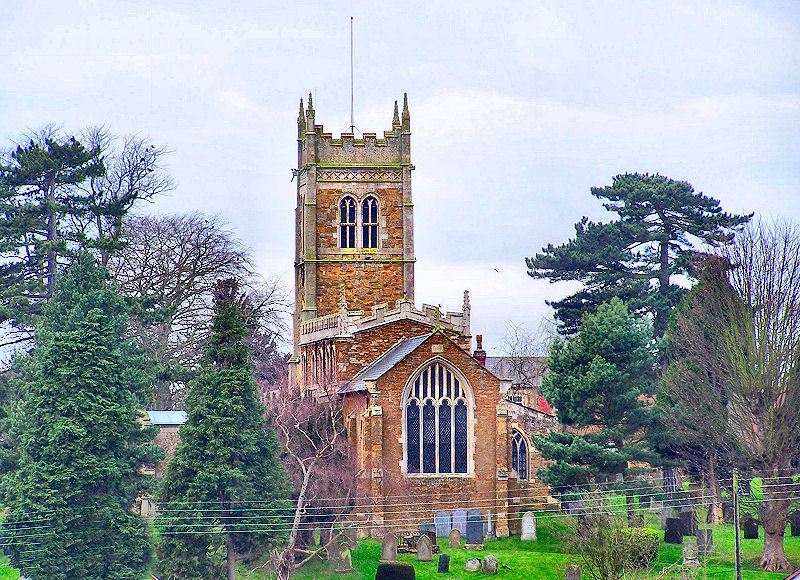
Scalford parish church of St Egelwin

The Scalford parish church, which is on a small hill in the centre of the village, is named after St Egelwin the Martyr (alias St Ethelwin) and is believed to be the only one in the country dedicated to this saint. It was built circa 1100 AD. The organ of 1859 is by Lloyd & Valentine of Nottingham. The Grade II* listed building was refurbished internally in 2014 to include a kitchen and toilet area, improved heating and better lighting. During the renovation the original pews were cleaned and restored and the old tile floor was uncovered, cleaned and repaired. The church is used for services on the first and third Sundays of the month, the nearest alternative places of Church of England worship being the churches in Eastwell and Waltham on the Wolds. The Rector is responsible for six other churches in addition to Scalford.

In addition to Scalford village, the civil parish includes the hamlet of Wycomb and the village of Chadwell. The latter has a tiny Church of England church, St Mary's, which was damaged in the 17th century and later restored in a smaller form. It is a Grade II* listed building but is in poor condition and is currently closed.

The Scalford Methodist Church, built in 1844, closed in October 2019 due to the cost of necessary repairs. Its closure led to a loss of community groups including a pre-school group which had been in existence for over 40 years.

== Amenities ==
Like many villages, Scalford has lost a number of industries and amenities over the years. There used to be a dairy which produced Stilton cheese, three bakers, a blacksmith, stonemasons, builders, a shoemender, a range of shops (one incorporating the post office), a garage and a second pub, The Plough, all now gone. There were also flourishing brickyards around 1875 to 1930 and bricks with the Scalford imprint burned in can still be found. The master's house remains and is called Lion House after the company name.

Currently (2017) there is one public house and restaurant in the village, the Kings Arms, along with a school and a post office (in a kitchen) which also sells a limited range of groceries. There is also a garden centre and landscape developer. This local company has won gold awards for garden design at the nationally recognised competition at the Sandringham Estate, Norfolk since 2008.

In the 21st century, new housing has been restricted to in-fill and a small development on the site of the old stilton cheese factory and dairy. There is a modern village hall surrounded by a playing field, which hosts a range of community activities.

In addition to the established farming community, the village is home to many professionals who work in Leicester, Nottingham and even further afield. In the past decade there have been a number of recipients of MBEs for services to the community, sport and geological study.

In times gone by, the village was entirely surrounded by a triangle of railways. Scalford station was on the GNR and LNWR Joint Line from Market Harborough to Bottesford, while a number of mineral lines, attracted by the iron-ore mining which used to take place in this part of the Vale of Belvoir, completed the triangle. Before 1939 the lines were often used for transporting horses to local races and point to point meetings. Regular passenger services ended in 1953 but the lines survived for freight and summer specials until final closure came in 1962. Some of the railway infrastructure still exists in the form of various cuttings and embankments, which have largely become incorporated into the countryside but leaving in place a few bridges and footpaths.

Scalford is situated on the Jubilee Way footpath from Melton Mowbray to Belvoir Castle, and is a 'stop off' for walkers between Melton and the Vale of Belvoir. Scalford can be reached from Melton or the Vale by bus and there is parking at the village hall, which is overlooked by nearby houses, and quiet roads suitable for cycling.

Scalford Hall, on the outskirts of the village, is an Edwardian mansion house which was later used as a hotel and wedding venue but is now disused. In the 1940s it was the home of Colonel Colman, of the Colman's mustard company. The Colonel was a friend of the Prince of Wales, later King Edward VIII, and throughout their much publicised courtship, Edward and American divorcee Wallis Simpson regularly stayed at Scalford Hall.
