= HMS Shalford =

History

United Kingdom
- Name: HMS Shalford
- Builder: Yarrow
- Launched: 29 October 1951
- Completed: 21 August 1952
- Identification: Pennant number: P3101
- Fate: Sold 8 September 1967 to Singapore for break up

General characteristics
- Class & type: Ford-class seaward defence boat
- Displacement: 120 tons standard; 160 tons full load
- Length: 117 ft 3 in (35.74 m)
- Beam: 20 ft (6.1 m)
- Draught: 6 ft 6 in (1.98 m)
- Propulsion: 1 × Foden diesel (centre shaft); 2 × Paxman 12YHAX 550 hp (410 kW) diesels (outer shafts)
- Speed: 20 knots (37 km/h; 23 mph)
- Complement: 19
- Armament: 1 × 40 mm anti-aircraft gun; 2 × 20 mm anti aircraft guns

HMS Shalford was one of 20 boats of the Ford class of patrol boats built for the Royal Navy in the 1950s.

Their names were all chosen from villages ending in -ford. This boat was named after Shalford.
