= Shalford =

Shalford may refer to:

Places in England

- Shalford, Essex
- Shalford, Somerset
- Shalford, Surrey

Other

- HMS Shalford, a Ford class seaward defence boat of the Royal Navy

== See also ==
- Scalford
- Shelford (disambiguation)
