= Shelford Rugby Club =

English rugby union club, based in Great Shelford

- Union: Eastern Counties RFU
- Nickname: Peacocks
- Founded: 1933; 93 years ago
- Location: Great Shelford, Cambridgeshire, England
- Ground: The Davey Field (Capacity: 2,000 (150 seated))
- Chairman: Anthony Roberts
- President: Rory Finlayson
- Coach: Will Cotterill
- Captain: Charlie Baker
- League: Regional 1 South East
- 2025−26: 12th (relegated to Regional 2 East Midlands)
Team kit

Official website
- www.shelfordrugby.co.uk

Shelford Rugby Club is an English rugby union football club based in Great Shelford, Cambridgeshire. The club currently play in Regional 2 East Midlands – at the sixth tier of the English rugby union league system – following their relegation from Regional 1 South East at the end of the 2025–26 season. Shelford run five men's sides, two women's sides and fifteen junior teams for boys and girls. They are members of the Eastern Counties Rugby Football Union.

== History ==
Shelford Rugby Club was formed in 1933 following the formation of a rugby section of Shelford Amateur Sports Association. The announcement was first published in the Cambridge Independent Press which also decreed that the club's colours would be claret shirts with white collars. They first played on land loaned to them by a Mrs Goldsmith near Shelford railway station and changed in the nearby pub. The land was given to them by P. J. Davey who donated the land to them, which was named Davey Field in his honour. It was officially opened in 1966 with a match against Northampton Saints. The club moved to its present ground in 1965. Since the leagues began in 1987, Shelford have reached as high a level as the fourth tier (National League 2 South). In 2009, they were promoted to National League 2 South. They played in this division between 2009 and 2015 when they were eventually relegated back to National League 3 London & South East., having finished in 15th place.

In 2016, Davey Field was renovated and transformed from a grass pitch to a 3G pitch with floodlights and perimeter barriers installed. This £1 million project was funded by the Rugby Football Union as a part of an initiative to increase the number of community 3G pitches following the 2015 Rugby World Cup. Shelford also agreed a new ten year lease allowing them twelve guaranteed hours a week on the pitch. They avoided relegation during the 2017-18 London & South East Premier season with a win against Tunbridge Wells. However, the following season they were relegated to London 1 North.

== Honours ==
- London 3 North East champions (2): 2001–02, 2003–04
- London Division 1 champions: 2008–09
- London 1 North champions: 2021–22
