= 2016–17 National League 2 South =

Rugby union competition in England

- Countries: England
- Date: September 2016 – May 2017
- Champions: Bishop's Stortford (1st title)
- Runners-up: Old Elthamians (also promoted)
- Relegated: Exmouth, Barnes
- Matches played: 240
- Attendance: 91,074 (average 379 per match)
- Highest attendance: 1,664; Bishop's Stortford v Barnes; 29 April 2017
- Lowest attendance: 45; Barnes v Worthing Raiders; 17 December 2016
- Top point scorer: (England) Tom Banks (Bishop's Stortford); 323
- Top try scorer: (Guyana) Dominic Lespierre (Old Elthamians); 36

The 2016–17 National League 2 South was the eighth season (30th overall) of the fourth tier (south) of the English domestic rugby union competitions since the professionalised format of the second division was introduced. New teams to the division include Henley Hawks and Cinderford (both relegated from National League 1) while Exmouth (champions) and Barnstaple were promoted from National League 3 South West along with London Irish Wild Geese who won National League 3 London & SE. The league system is 4 points for a win, 2 points for a draw and additional bonus points being awarded for scoring 4 or more tries and/or losing within 7 points of the victorious team. In terms of promotion the league champions are promoted to National League 1 while the second-placed team play-off against the second-placed team from National League 2 North (at the home ground of the club with the superior league record) for the final promotion place.

At the end of the season Bishop's Stortford were crowned champions on 22 April 2017 after beating Exmouth 60-7 away - reaching the highest level in the clubs' history. It was a worthy reward for Bishop's Stortford who finished 3rd the previous season and lost the playoff the season before that. A further highlight for Bishop's Stortford was the club record attendance of 1,664 that attending Silver Leys for the final league match of the season - a figure that was also the highest in National League 2 South that year. Although Bishop's Stortford's won the league with a game to spare it had been a very close battle for promotion as they faced strong competition from Chinnor and Old Elthamians up until the penultimate game. Chinnor had looked likely champions during the first half of the season but in the end missed out on promotion altogether, as despite finishing dead level on points with Old Elthamians they had one less win than the Kent side.

As runners up Old Elthamians would have to head north for their promotion playoff as the 2016–17 National League 2 North second placed side, Sale, had finished with more 2 more league points (124 to 122). On 6 May 2017 Old Elthamians beat Sale 19-14 at Heywood Road to clinch promotion to join Bishop's Stortford in the 2017–18 National League 1 - and just like the Hertfordshire side it would the highest level Old Elthamians had ever reached in the club's history.

The liquidation of London Welsh in January 2017, and their expulsion from the RFU Championship, meant that there were only 5 teams instead of the usual 6 relegated from National League 2 South and National League 2 North this season - meaning that one league would have 3 teams going down and the other having just 2 depending on league points gained. Newly promoted Exmouth were the first team to be relegated on 8 April 2017 when they lost 20-36 away to Clifton, way adrift of the teams above them. The other spots were much more keenly contested with 4 teams facing possible relegation on the last day of the season in what was one of the most exciting relegation battles for years. In the end it was Barnes who went down - a final round try bonus point defeat not enough despite tying them with relegation rivals, Barnstaple, who had a superior win record. Any other season Barnstaple would have gone down as they finished in 14th place but they ended up having more than the equivalent side Harrogate had in the 2016–17 National League 2 North - 51 points to 47 - condemning the Yorkshire side to the drop instead. The final league table shows how close this season was at both ends of the table. Only 5 points separate the top 3 sides, while just 3 points separate 12th placed Worthing Raiders from 15th placed Barnes. Exmouth would fall down to National League 3 South West while Barnes would drop to National League 3 London & SE.

Other points to consider for the season was that despite falling attendances in leagues such as the RFU Championship, National League 2 South actually recorded an increase in overall attendances - up to 91,074 (or 379 per game) from 88,674 (369 per game) the previous year. This was helped by record club attendances for both Bishop's Stortford and Chinnor (both over 1,500), while promoted side Barnstaple also did well. Redruth, who struggled towards the end of the season, were once again the best supported side in the division, averaging over 800 supporters per game. This was despite losing the Cornish derby with Launceston who were relegated the previous season.

== Structure ==
The league consists of sixteen teams with all the teams playing each other on a home and away basis to make a total of thirty matches each. There is one automatic promotion place, one play-off place and three relegation places. The champions are promoted to the 2017–18 National League 1 and the runners-up play the second-placed team in the 2016–17 National League 2 North with the winner being promoted. The last three teams are relegated to either National League 3 London & SE or National League 3 South West depending on the geographical location of the team (in some cases teams may join the Midlands regional leagues).

== Participating teams and locations ==
Eleven of the teams listed below participated in the 2015–16 National League 2 South season; Henley Hawks and Cinderford were relegated from the 2015–16 National League 1 while London Irish Wild Geese were promoted as champions of National League 3 London & SE and Exmouth (champions) and Barnstaple (playoffs) from National League 3 South West. This season would also see Old Elthamians move from the 500 capacity Queen Mary Sports Ground in Chislehurst to College Meadow in Eltham.

Locations of the 2016–17 National League 2 South teams

Team	Stadium	Capacity	City/Area	Previous season
Barnes	Barn Elms	500	Barnes, London	13th
Barnstaple	Pottington Road	2,000 (575 seats)	Barnstaple, Devon	Promoted from National League 3 South West (playoffs)
Bishop's Stortford	Silver Leys	1,600	Bishop's Stortford, Hertfordshire	3rd
Bury St Edmunds	The Haberden	3,000 (135 seats)	Bury St Edmunds, Suffolk	7th
Canterbury	The Marine Travel Ground	1,500 (75 seats)	Canterbury, Kent	10th
Chinnor	Kingsey Road	2,000	Thame, Oxfordshire	6th
Cinderford	Dockham Road	2,500	Cinderford, Gloucestershire	Relegated from National League 1 (15th)
Clifton	Station Road	2,200 (200 seats)	Cribbs Causeway, Patchway, Bristol	12th
Exmouth	Imperial Recreation Ground	1,250 (250 stand)	Exmouth, Devon	Promoted from National League 3 South West (champions)
Henley Hawks	Dry Leas	4,000	Henley-on-Thames, Oxfordshire	Relegated from National League 1 (16th)
London Irish Wild Geese	Hazelwood	2,000	Sunbury-on-Thames, Surrey	Promoted from National League 3 London & SE (champions)
Old Elthamians	College Meadow	1,800	Eltham, Greenwich, London	9th
Redingensians Rams	Old Bath Road	1,250	Sonning, Reading, Berkshire	8th
Redruth	The Recreation Ground	3,500 (580 seats)	Redruth, Cornwall	4th
Taunton Titans	Hyde Park	2,000 (198 seats)	Taunton, Somerset	5th
Worthing Raiders	Roundstone Lane	1,500 (100 seats)	Angmering, West Sussex	11th

== League table ==
2016–17 National League 2 South table
Pos	Team	Pld	W	D	L	PF	PA	PD	TB	LB	Pts	Qualification
1	Bishop's Stortford (C, P)	30	25	0	5	1053	549	+504	25	4	129	Promoted
2	Old Elthamians (P)	30	25	0	5	1071	533	+538	19	3	122	Promotion play-off
3	Chinnor	30	24	2	4	1111	546	+565	21	1	122	
4	Taunton Titans	30	19	3	8	901	735	+166	19	4	105	
5	Redruth	30	19	1	10	824	609	+215	18	5	101	
6	Redingensians Rams	30	16	1	13	756	618	+138	12	9	87	
7	Cinderford	30	16	2	12	746	725	+21	16	5	84 (Note: Cinderford were deducted 5 points for fielding unregistered players against Canterbury on 3 September 2016.)	
8	Canterbury	30	15	0	15	720	732	−12	11	7	78	
9	Henley Hawks	30	13	1	16	775	840	−65	14	7	75	
10	Clifton	30	14	0	16	683	843	−160	11	4	71	
11	Bury St Edmunds	30	11	1	18	675	818	−143	11	7	64	
12	Worthing Raiders	30	9	0	21	657	938	−281	9	8	53	
13	London Irish Wild Geese	30	8	0	22	664	960	−296	14	6	52	
14	Barnstaple	30	9	1	20	532	886	−354	6	7	51	
15	Barnes (R)	30	6	3	21	599	817	−218	12	9	51	Relegated
16	Exmouth (R)	30	3	1	26	554	1172	−618	9	6	29	Relegated

Updated to match(es) played on 29 April 2017. Source: "National League 2 South". NCA Rugby.
Rules for classification: If teams are level at any stage, tiebreakers are applied in the following order:
1. Number of matches won
2. Difference between points for and against
3. Total number of points for
4. Aggregate number of points scored in matches between tied teams
5. Number of matches won excluding the first match, then the second and so on until the tie is settled
  (C) Champion; (P) Promoted; (R) Relegated
  Notes:

== Results ==
=== Round 1 ===
3 September 2016
14:30

Barnstaple	8 - 31	Old Elthamians
	Report

Pottingham Road
Attendance: 350
Referee: Alexander Thomas

3 September 2016
14:30

Exmouth	10 - 22	Worthing Raiders
	Report

Imperial Recreation Ground
Attendance: 250
Referee: Shane Lewis

3 September 2016
14:30

Redingensians Rams	22 - 39	Taunton Titans (BP)
	Report

Old Bath Road
Attendance: 96
Referee: Daniel Collins

3 September 2016
15:00

(BP) Barnes	13 - 20	Bishop's Stortford (BP)
	Report

Barn Elms
Attendance: 120
Referee: Robert Teare

3 September 2016
15:00

Bury St Edmunds	30 - 10	Clifton
	Report

The Haberden
Attendance: 252
Referee: James Clarke

3 September 2016
15:00

(BP) Chinnor	47 - 10	London Irish Wild Geese
	Report

Kingsey Road
Attendance: 241
Referee: David Clarkson

3 September 2016
15:00

Cinderford	14 - 7	Canterbury (BP)
	Report

Dockham Road
Attendance: 243
Referee: Philip Davies

3 September 2016
15:00

Redruth	23 - 18	Henley Hawks (BP)
	Report

The Recreation Ground
Attendance: 695
Referee: Calum Howard

=== Round 2 ===
10 September 2016
14:30

(2BP) Clifton	25 – 31	Cinderford (BP)
	Report

Station Road
Attendance: 157
Referee: Philip Davies

10 September 2016
15:00

(BP) Bishop's Stortford	36 – 7	Bury St Edmunds
	Report

Silver Leys
Attendance: 275
Referee: Anthony Woodthorpe

10 September 2016
15:00

(BP) Canterbury	15 – 17	Old Elthamians
	Report

The Marine Travel Ground
Attendance: 300
Referee: Luis Caviglia

10 September 2016
15:00

Henley Hawks	13 – 22	Chinnor
	Report

Dry Leas
Attendance: 313
Referee: David Conway

10 September 2016
15:00

London Irish Wild Geese	13 – 28	Redingensians Rams
	Report

Hazelwood
Attendance: 100
Referee: Thomas Davis

10 September 2016
15:00

(BP) Redruth	48 – 12	Barnstaple
	Report

The Recreation Ground
Attendance: 650
Referee: James Leal

10 September 2016
15:00

(BP) Taunton Titans	59 – 10	Exmouth
	Report

Hyde Park
Attendance: 350
Referee: Karl Steven Dickson

10 September 2016
15:00

Worthing Raiders	20 – 17	Barnes (BP)
	Report

Roundstone Lane
Attendance: 361
Referee: Andrew MacNeaney

=== Round 3 ===
17 September 2016
14:30

(BP) Barnstaple	26 – 43	Canterbury (BP)
	Report

Pottingham Road
Attendance: 550
Referee: Sara Cox

17 September 2016
14:30

Exmouth	20 – 40	London Irish Wild Geese (BP)
	Report

Imperial Recreation Ground
Attendance: 200
Referee: Adam Leal

17 September 2016
14:30

(BP) Redingensians Rams	22 – 26	Henley Hawks
	Report

Old Bath Road
Attendance: 429
Referee: Andrew MacNeaney

17 September 2016
15:00

(BP) Barnes	27 – 35	Taunton Titans (BP)
	Report

Barn Elms
Attendance: 265
Referee: David Conway

17 September 2016
15:00

Bury St Edmunds	20 – 10	Worthing Raiders
	Report

The Haberden
Attendance: 308
Referee: Alexis Manley

17 September 2016
15:00

Chinnor	21 – 5	Redruth
	Report

Kingsey Road
Attendance: 296
Referee: Alexander Thomas

17 September 2016
15:00

Cinderford	15 – 23	Bishop's Stortford
	Report

Dockham Road
Attendance: 289
Referee: Luke Haskins

17 September 2016
15:00

(BP) Old Elthamians	46 – 19	Clifton
	Report

College Meadow
Attendance: 420
Referee: Thomas Davis

=== Round 4 ===
24 September 2016
14:30

(BP) Bishop's Stortford	19 – 22	Old Elthamians
	Report

Silver Leys
Attendance: 610
Referee: David Clarkson

24 September 2016
14:30

Clifton	25 – 20	Canterbury (BP)
	Report

Station Road
Attendance: 109
Referee: Shane Lewis

24 September 2016
15:00

(BP) Chinnor	76 – 5	Barnstaple
	Report

Kingsey Road
Attendance: 271
Referee: Calum Howard

24 September 2016
15:00

(BP) Henley Hawks	43 – 38	Exmouth (2BP)
	Report

Dry Leas
Attendance: 285
Referee: Daniel Collins

24 September 2016
15:00

(BP) London Irish Wild Geese	31 – 17	Barnes
	Report

Hazelwood
Attendance: 250
Referee: Alexis Manley

24 September 2016
15:00

Redruth	10 – 8	Redingensians Rams (BP)
	Report

The Recreation Ground
Attendance: 720
Referee: Anthony Woodthorpe

24 September 2016
15:00

(BP) Taunton Titans	30 – 26	Bury St Edmunds (BP)
	Report

Hyde Park
Attendance: 525
Referee: Ben Russell

24 September 2016
15:00

Worthing Raiders	21 – 15	Cinderford (BP)
	Report

Roundstone Lane
Attendance: 538
Referee: David Conway

=== Round 5 ===
1 October 2016
14:30

Exmouth	17 – 60	Redruth (BP)
	Report

Imperial Recreation Ground
Attendance: 220
Referee: Andrew MacNeaney

1 October 2016
14:30

(BP) Old Elthamians	37 – 17	Worthing Raiders
	Report

College Meadow
Attendance: 275
Referee: James Clarke

1 October 2016
14:30

Redingensians Rams	17 – 32	Chinnor (BP)
	Report

Old Bath Road
Attendance: 309
Referee: Jack Lewars

1 October 2016
15:00

(BP) Barnes	36 – 14	Henley Hawks
	Report

Barn Elms
Attendance: 155
Referee: Anthony Woodthorpe

1 October 2016
15:00

Barnstaple	24 – 22	Clifton (BP)
	Report

Pottingham Road
Attendance: 550
Referee: Daniel Parrott

1 October 2016
15:00

(BP) Bury St Edmunds	39 – 15	London Irish Wild Geese
	Report

The Haberden
Attendance: 404
Referee: Gareth Holsgrove

1 October 2016
15:00

(BP) Canterbury	38 – 34	Bishop's Stortford (2BP)
	Report

The Marine Travel Ground
Attendance: 187
Referee: Robert Bourke

1 October 2016
15:00

(2BP) Cinderford	29 – 34	Taunton Titans (BP)
	Report

Dockham Road
Attendance: 175
Referee: Sara Cox

=== Round 6 ===
8 October 2016
14:30

(BP) Redingensians Rams	31 – 20	Barnstaple
	Report

Old Bath Road
Attendance: 243
Referee: Luke Haskins

8 October 2016
15:00

(BP) Bishop's Stortford	55 – 0	Clifton
	Report

Silver Leys
Attendance: 375
Referee: David Conway

8 October 2016
15:00

(BP) Chinnor	83 – 7	Exmouth
	Report

Kingsey Road
Attendance: 420
Referee: Thomas Davis

8 October 2016
15:00

(BP) Henley Hawks	41 – 36	Bury St Edmunds (2BP)
	Report

Dry Leas
Attendance: 355
Referee: Calum Howard

8 October 2016
15:00

(BP) London Irish Wild Geese	24 – 35	Cinderford (BP)
	Report

Hazelwood
Attendance: 95
Referee: Andrew MacNeaney

8 October 2016
15:00

(BP) Redruth	26 – 20	Barnes (BP)
	Report

The Recreation Ground
Attendance: 630
Referee: Shane Lewis

8 October 2016
15:00

Taunton Titans	14 – 44	Old Elthamians (BP)
	Report

Hyde Park
Attendance: 425
Referee: Adam Leal

8 October 2016
15:00

Worthing Raiders	30 – 12	Canterbury
	Report

Roundstone Lane
Attendance: 455
Referee: Sara Cox

=== Round 7 ===
15 October 2016
14:00

Bury St Edmunds	22 – 35	Redruth (BP)
	Report

The Haberden
Attendance: 470
Referee: Alexis Manley

15 October 2016
14:30

Barnstaple	8 – 47	Bishop's Stortford (BP)
	Report

Pottingham Road
Attendance: 450
Referee: Ben Russell

15 October 2016
14:30

Clifton	33 – 22	Worthing Raiders
	Report

Station Road
Attendance: 210
Referee: Louis Caviglia

15 October 2016
14:30

Exmouth	7 – 7	Redingensians Rams
	Report

Imperial Recreation Ground
Attendance: 191
Referee: Shane Lewes

15 October 2016
14:30

(BP) Old Elthamians	38 – 17	London Irish Wild Geese
	Report

College Meadow
Attendance: 450
Referee: Anthony Woodthorpe

15 October 2016
15:00

(BP) Barnes	28 – 61	Chinnor (BP)
	Report

Barn Elms
Attendance: 120
Referee: Calum Howard

15 October 2016
15:00

(BP) Canterbury	22 – 25	Taunton Titans (BP)
	Report

The Marine Travel Ground
Attendance: 337
Referee: Thomas Davis

15 October 2016
15:00

(BP) Cinderford	30 – 23	Henley Hawks (BP)
	Report

Dockham Road
Attendance: 320
Referee: Robert Bourke

=== Round 8 ===
22 October 2016
14:30

(BP) Exmouth	38 – 20	Barnstaple
	Report

Imperial Recreation Ground
Attendance: 287
Referee: Sam Brown

22 October 2016
14:30

Redingensians Rams	33 – 12	Barnes
	Report

Old Bath Road
Attendance: 270
Referee: Jack Lewars

22 October 2016
15:00

(BP) Chinnor	45 – 14	Bury St Edmunds
	Report

Kingsey Road
Attendance: 346
Referee: Andrew MacNeaney

22 October 2016
15:00

Henley Hawks	20 – 30	Old Elthamians (BP)
	Report

Dry Leas
Attendance: 342
Referee: Robert Teare

22 October 2016
15:00

(BP) Redruth	54 – 11	Cinderford
	Report

The Recreation Ground
Attendance: 765
Referee: Gareth Holsgrove

22 October 2016
15:00

(2BP) Taunton Titans	30 – 32	Clifton (BP)
	Report

Hyde Park
Attendance: 600
Referee: Robert Bourke

22 October 2016
15:00

(2BP) Worthing Raiders	30 – 36	Bishop's Stortford (BP)
	Report

Roundstone Lane
Attendance: 625
Referee: Calum Wilson

22 October 2016
15:00

(BP) London Irish Wild Geese	34 – 29	Canterbury (BP)
	Report

Hazelwood
Attendance: 258
Referee: David Conway

=== Round 9 ===
29 October 2016
14:30

(BP) Barnes	33 – 28	Exmouth (2BP)
	Report

Barn Elms
Attendance: 75
Referee: Benjamin Russell

29 October 2016
14:30

Barnstaple	9 – 7	Worthing Raiders (BP)
	Report

Pottingham Road
Attendance: 790
Referee: Robert Teare

29 October 2016
14:30

(BP) Clifton	27 – 15	London Irish Wild Geese
	Report

Station Road
Attendance: 171
Referee: Shane Lewis

29 October 2016
14:30

(BP) Old Elthamians	43 – 25	Redruth
	Report

College Meadow
Attendance: 578
Referee: David Clarkson

29 October 2016
15:00

(BP) Bishop's Stortford	50 – 21	Taunton Titans
	Report

Silver Leys
Attendance: 550
Referee: Luis Caviglia

29 October 2016
15:00

Bury St Edmunds	17 – 37	Redingensians Rams (BP)
	Report

The Haberden
Attendance: 334
Referee: Ryan Smith

29 October 2016
15:00

(BP) Canterbury	51 – 17	Henley Hawks
	Report

The Marine Travel Ground
Attendance: 269
Referee: Luke Haskins

29 October 2016
15:00

Cinderford	9 – 26	Chinnor (BP)
	Report

Dockham Road
Attendance: 310
Referee: Anthony Woodthorpe

=== Round 10 ===
5 November 2016
14:00

(BP) Redingensians Rams	41 – 24	Cinderford
	Report

Old Bath Road
Attendance: 206
Referee: Ben Rayner

5 November 2016
14:30

Barnes	24 – 24	Barnstaple
	Report

Barn Elms
Attendance: 148
Referee: Luis Caviglia

5 November 2016
14:30

(2BP) Exmouth	26 – 29	Bury St Edmunds (BP)
	Report

Imperial Recreation Ground
Attendance: 250
Referee: Daniel Collins

5 November 2016
14:30

(BP) Redruth	26 – 34	Canterbury (BP)
	Report

The Recreation Round
Attendance: 870
Referee: Shane Lewis

5 November 2016
15:00

(BP) Chinnor	40 – 22	Old Elthamians
	Report

Kingsey Road
Attendance: 837
Referee: Gareth Holsgrove

5 November 2016
15:00

Henley Hawks	13 – 23	Clifton
	Report

Dry Leas
Attendance: 365
Referee: Alexander Thomas

5 November 2016
15:00

(2BP) London Irish Wild Geese	31 – 36	Bishop's Stortford (BP)
	Report

Hazelwood
Attendance: 326
Referee: Robbie Bourke

5 November 2016
15:00

(BP) Taunton Titans	59 – 19	Worthing Raiders
	Report

Hyde Park
Attendance: 425
Referee: Phillip Davies

=== Round 11 ===
12 November 2016
14:00

Barnstaple	22 – 19	Taunton Titans (BP)
	Report

Pottingham Road
Attendance: 575
Referee: David Conway

12 November 2016
14:00

Old Elthamians	5 – 22	Redingensians Rams
	Report

College Meadow
Attendance: 163
Referee: Thomas Davis

12 November 2016
14:00

Worthing Raiders	26 – 22	London Irish Wild Geese (2BP)
	Report

Roundstone Lane
Attendance: 405
Referee: Andrew MacNeaney

12 November 2016
14:30

(BP) Bishop's Stortford	27 – 17	Henley Hawks
	Report

Silver Leys
Attendance: 327
Referee: Jack Lewars

12 November 2016
14:30

Clifton	20 – 28	Redruth (BP)
	Report

Station Road
Attendance: 187
Referee: Claire Hodnett

12 November 2016
15:00

Bury St Edmunds	12 – 10	Barnes (BP)
	Report

The Haberden
Attendance: 201
Referee: Daniel Parrott

12 November 2016
15:00

Canterbury	16 – 12	Chinnor (BP)
	Report

The Marine Travel Ground
Attendance: 247
Referee: Alexis Manley

12 November 2016
15:00

(BP) Cinderford	27 – 12	Exmouth
	Report

Dockham Road
Attendance: 190
Referee: Shane Lewis

=== Round 12 ===
19 November 2016
14:00

(BP) Barnes	22 – 22	Cinderford
	Report

Barn Elms
Attendance: 121
Referee: Luke Haskins

19 November 2016
14:00

(BP) Redingensians Rams	27 – 31	Canterbury (BP)
	Report

Old Bath Road
Attendance: 265
Referee: Andrew MacNeaney

19 November 2016
14:30

Exmouth	8 – 29	Old Elthamians (BP)
	Report

Imperial Recreation Ground
Attendance: 327
Referee: Daniel Parrott

19 November 2016
14:30

Redruth	24 – 13	Bishop's Stortford
	Report

The Recreation Ground
Attendance: 620
Referee: Alexis Manley

19 November 2016
15:00

(BP) Bury St Edmunds	33 – 27	Barnstaple (BP)
	Report

The Haberden
Attendance: 299
Referee: Robert Bourke

19 November 2016
15:00

(BP) Chinnor	58 – 17	Clifton
	Report

Kingsey Road
Attendance: 400
Referee: Alexander Thomas

19 November 2016
15:00

Henley Hawks	30 – 22	Worthing Raiders
	Report

Dry Leas
Attendance: 320
Referee: David Clarkson

19 November 2016
15:00

(BP) London Irish Wild Geese	24 – 49	Taunton Titans (BP)
	Report

Hazelwood
Attendance: 148
Referee: Luis Caviglia

=== Round 13 ===
26 November 2016
14:00

(BP) Barnstaple	27 – 10	London Irish Wild Geese
	Report

Pottingham Road
Attendance: 550
Referee: Anthony Woodthorpe

26 November 2016
14:30

(BP) Bishop's Stortford	30 – 22	Chinnor (BP)
	Report

Silver Leys
Attendance: 438
Referee: Phillip Davies

26 November 2016
14:00

(BP) Old Elthamians	49 – 3	Barnes
	Report

College Meadow
Attendance: 292
Referee: Jack Lewars

26 November 2016
14:00

(2BP) Worthing Raiders	27 – 29	Redruth (BP)
	Report

Roundstone Lane
Attendance: 611
Referee: David Conway

26 November 2016
14:30

Clifton	25 – 19	Redingensians Rams (BP)
	Report

Station Road
Attendance: 78
Referee: Benjamin Russell

26 November 2016
15:00

(BP) Canterbury	48 – 38	Exmouth (BP)
	Report

The Marine Travel Ground
Attendance: 227
Referee: Calum Howard

26 November 2016
15:00

(BP) Cinderford	29 – 26	Bury St Edmunds (2BP)
	Report

Dockham Road
Attendance: 182
Referee: Luke Haskins

26 November 2016
16:30

(BP) Taunton Titans	38 – 27	Henley Hawks
	Report

Hyde Park
Attendance: 475
Referee: Ryan Smith

=== Round 14 ===
3 December 2016
14:00

Barnes	8 – 38	Canterbury (BP)
	Report

Barn Elms
Attendance: 53
Referee: Adam Wookey

3 December 2016
14:00

Exmouth	21 – 34	Clifton (BP)
	Report

Imperial Recreation Ground
Attendance: 210
Referee: Luis Caviglia

3 December 2016
14:00

(BP) Redingensians Rams	24 – 25	Bishop's Stortford (BP)
	Report

Old Bath Road
Attendance: 161
Referee: Daniel Collins

3 December 2016
14:00

(BP) Redruth	18 – 22	Taunton Titans
	Report

The Recreation Ground
Attendance: 870
Referee: Luke Haskins

3 December 2016
14:30

(BP) Chinnor	57 – 10	Worthing Raiders
	Report

Kingsey Road
Attendance: 354
Referee: David Clarkson

3 December 2016
15:00

Bury St Edmunds	21 – 31	Old Elthamians (BP)
	Report

The Haberden
Attendance: 331
Referee: Thomas Davis

3 December 2016
15:00

(BP) Cinderford	29 – 10	Barnstaple
	Report

Dockham Road
Attendance: 170
Referee: Clare Hodnett

3 December 2016
15:00

(BP) Henley Hawks	25 – 24	London Irish Wild Geese (BP)
	Report

Dry Leas
Attendance: 345
Referee: Andrew MacNeaney

=== Round 15 ===
10 December 2016
14:00

(BP) Barnstaple	31 – 24	Henley Hawks (2BP)
	Report

Pottingham Road
Attendance: 425
Referee: Adam Wookey

10 December 2016
14:00

(BP) Bishop's Stortford	38 – 7	Exmouth
	Report

Silver Leys
Attendance: 404
Referee: Calum Howard

10 December 2016
14:00

Old Elthamians	25 – 24	Cinderford (2BP)
	Report

College Meadow
Attendance: 272
Referee: Jack Lewars

10 December 2016
14:00

(BP) Worthing Raiders	24 – 29	Redingensians Rams (BP)
	Report

Roundstone Lane
Attendance: 435
Referee: Luis Caviglia

10 December 2016
14:30

Clifton	21 – 12	Barnes
	Report

Station Road
Attendance: 117
Referee: Sara Cox

10 December 2016
15:00

(BP) Canterbury	31 – 15	Bury St Edmunds
	Report

The Marine Travel Ground
Attendance: 364
Referee: Richard Timbrell

10 December 2016
15:00

(BP) London Irish Wild Geese	29 – 21	Redruth
	Report

Hazelwood
Attendance: 132
Referee: Daniel Collins

10 December 2016
15:00

Taunton Titans	13 – 13	Chinnor
	Report

Hyde Park
Attendance: 551
Referee: Gareth Holsgrove

=== Round 16 ===
17 December 2016
14:00

Barnes	20 – 8	Worthing Raiders
	Report

Barn Elms
Attendance: 45
Referee: Jack Lewars

17 December 2016
14:00

Barnstaple	15 – 46	Redruth (BP)
	Report

Pottingham Road
Attendance: 735
Referee: Charlie Gayther

17 December 2016
14:00

Exmouth	15 – 40	Taunton Titans (BP)
	Report

Imperial Recreation Ground
Attendance: 300
Referee: Daniel Parott

17 December 2016
14:00

Old Elthamians	18 – 14	Canterbury (BP)
	Report

College Meadow
Attendance: 276
Referee: Ryan Smith

17 December 2016
14:00

(BP) Redingensians Rams	39 – 24	London Irish Wild Geese
	Report

Old Bath Road
Attendance: 271
Referee: Shane Lewis

17 December 2016
14:30

(BP) Chinnor	29 – 29	Henley Hawks (BP)
	Report

Kingsey Road
Attendance: 850
Referee: Daniel Collins

17 December 2016
15:00

Bury St Edmunds	16 – 33	Bishop's Stortford (BP)
	Report

The Haberden
Attendance: 539
Referee: Andrew MacNeaney

17 December 2016
15:00

(BP) Cinderford	35 – 17	Clifton
	Report

Dockham Road
Attendance: 262
Referee: Chris Bennett

=== Round 17 ===
7 January 2017
14:00

(2BP) Bishop's Stortford	29 – 30	Cinderford (BP)
	Report

Silver Leys
Attendance: 401
Referee: Daniel Collins

7 January 2017
14:00

(BP) Redruth	29 – 12	Chinnor
	Report

The Recreation Ground
Attendance: 830
Referee: Sara Cox

7 January 2017
14:00

(BP) Worthing Raiders	20 – 23	Bury St Edmunds
	Report

Roundstone Lane
Attendance: 543
Referee: Adam Leal

7 January 2017
14:30

Clifton	17 – 33	Old Elthamians (BP)
	Report

Station Road
Attendance: 138
Referee: Shane Lewis

7 January 2017
15:00

(BP) Canterbury	38 – 32	Barnstaple (2BP)
	Report

The Marine Travel Ground
Attendance: 423
Referee: Daniel Parrott

7 January 2017
15:00

Henley Hawks	17 – 12	Redingensians Rams (BP)
	Report

Dry Leas
Attendance: 845
Referee: Philip Davies

7 January 2017
15:00

(BP) London Irish Wild Geese	59 – 34	Exmouth (BP)
	Report

Hazelwood
Attendance: 455
Referee: Claire Hodnett

7 January 2017
15:00

(BP) Taunton Titans	31 – 31	Barnes (BP)
	Report

Hyde Park
Attendance: 325
Referee: Benjamin Russell

=== Round 18 ===
14 January 2017
14:00

(BP) Barnes	26 – 16	London Irish Wild Geese
	Report

Barn Elms
Attendance: 250
Referee: Luis Caviglia

14 January 2017
14:00

(BP) Barnstaple	15 – 17	Chinnor
	Report

Pottingham Road
Attendance: 675
Referee: Claire Hodnett

14 January 2017
14:00

Exmouth	20 – 16	Henley Hawks (BP)
	Report

Imperial Recreation Ground
Attendance: 150
Referee: David Clarkson

14 January 2017
14:00

(BP) Old Elthamians	14 – 16	Bishop's Stortford
	Report

College Meadow
Attendance: 473
Referee: James Clarke

14 January 2017
14:00

Redingensians Rams	14 – 28	Redruth (BP)
	Report

Old Bath Road
Attendance: 168
Referee: Thomas Davis

14 January 2017
15:00

Bury St Edmunds	8 – 22	Taunton Titans
	Report

The Haberden
Attendance: 398
Referee: Neil Chivers

14 January 2017
15:00

(BP) Canterbury	25 – 42	Clifton (BP)
	Report

The Marine Travel Ground
Attendance: 331
Referee: Daniel Collins

14 January 2017
15:00

(BP) Cinderford	53 – 18	Worthing Raiders
	Report

Dockham Road
Attendance: 177
Referee: Luke Haskins

=== Round 19 ===
21 January 2017
14:00

Bishop's Stortford	P – P	Canterbury

- Postponed as Canterbury RFC felt that the pitch was unplayable due to recent cold weather. Game rescheduled to 25 February 2017.

21 January 2017
14:00

(BP) Redruth	33 – 32	Exmouth (2BP)
	Report

The Recreation Ground
Attendance: 780
Referee: Shane Lewis

21 January 2017
14:00

Worthing Raiders	P – P	Old Elthamians

- Postponed due to frozen pitch. Game rescheduled to 25 February 2017.

21 January 2017
14:30

Chinnor	16 – 10	Redingensians Rams (BP)
	Report

Kingsey Road
Attendance: 420
Referee: Luis Caviglia

21 January 2017
14:30

Clifton	24 – 22	Barnstaple (BP)
	Report

Station Road
Attendance: 213
Referee: Calum Howard

21 January 2017
15:00

Henley Hawks	P – P	Barnes

- Postponed due to frozen pitch. Game rescheduled to 25 February 2017.

21 January 2017
15:00

(BP) London Irish Wild Geese	36 – 24	Bury St Edmunds (BP)
	Report

Hazelwood
Attendance: 450
Referee: Alexis Manley

21 January 2017
15:00

(BP) Taunton Titans	20 – 27	Cinderford (BP)
	Report

Hyde Park
Attendance: 475
Referee: Claire Hodnett

=== Round 20 ===
28 January 2017
14:00

Barnes	0 – 33	Redruth (BP)
	Report

Barn Elms
Attendance: 180
Referee: James Clarke

28 January 2017
14:00

(BP) Barnstaple	7 – 14	Redingensians Rams
	Report

Pottingham Road
Attendance: 550
Referee: David Conway

28 January 2017
14:00

Exmouth	20 – 37	Chinnor (BP)
	Report

Imperial Recreation Ground
Attendance: 200
Referee: Luke Haskins

28 January 2017
14:00

(BP) Old Elthamians	16 – 22	Taunton Titans (BP)
	Report

College Meadow
Attendance: 308
Referee: Luis Caviglia

28 January 2017
14:30

Clifton	11 – 43	Bishop's Stortford (BP)
	Report

Station Road
Attendance: 173
Referee: Robbie Bourke

28 January 2017
15:00

(BP) Bury St Edmunds	21 – 27	Henley Hawks (BP)
	Report

The Haberden
Attendance: 404
Referee: Jack Lewars

28 January 2017
15:00

Canterbury	13 – 7	Worthing Raiders (BP)
	Report

The Marine Travel Ground
Attendance: 279
Referee: Daniel Parrott

28 January 2017
15:00

(BP) Cinderford	43 – 0	London Irish Wild Geese
	Report

Dockham Road
Attendance: 243
Referee: Shane Lewis

=== Round 21 ===
4 February
14:00

(BP) Bishop's Stortford	35 – 12	Barnstaple
	Report

Silver Leys
Attendance: 407
Referee: Alexis Manley

4 February
15:00

London Irish Wild Geese	14 – 43	Old Elthamians (BP)
	Report

Hazelwood
Attendance: 150
Referee: Daniel Collins

4 February
14:00

Redruth	10 – 3	Bury St Edmunds (BP)
	Report

The Recreation Ground
Attendance: 635
Referee: Banjamin Russell

4 February
14:00

(BP) Worthing Raiders	11 – 15	Clifton
	Report

Roundstone Lane
Attendance: 385
Referee: Alex Thomas

4 February
14:30

(BP) Henley Hawks	17 – 20	Cinderford
	Report

Dry Leas
Attendance: 265
Referee: Calum Howard

4 February
14:30

(BP) Redingensians Rams	43 – 21	Exmouth
	Report

Old Bath Road
Attendance: 284
Referee: Robert Bourke

4 February
15:00

(BP) Chinnor	24 – 17	Barnes (BP)
	Report

Kingsey Road
Attendance: 350
Referee: Andrew MacNeaney

4 February
15:00

(BP) Taunton Titans	30 – 5	Canterbury
	Report

Hyde Park
Attendance: 300
Referee: Jack Lewars

=== Round 22 ===
11 February 2017
14:00

(BP) Barnes	22 – 36	Redingensians Rams (BP)
	Report

Barn Elms
Attendance: 103
Referee: Jack Lewars

11 February 2017
14:00

Barnstaple	13 – 6	Exmouth (BP)
	Report

Pottingham Road
Attendance: 725
Referee: Ben Russell

11 February 2017
14:00

(BP) Bishop's Stortford	52 – 14	Worthing Raiders
	Report

Silver Leys
Attendance: 328
Referee: Luis Caviglia

11 February 2017
14:00

(BP) Old Elthamians	39 – 20	Henley Hawks
	Report

College Meadow
Attendance: 245
Referee: Robert Bourke

11 February 2017
14:30

Clifton	5 – 25	Taunton Titans
	Report

Station Road
Attendance: 153
Referee: Andrew MacNeaney

11 February 2017
15:00

Bury St Edmunds	20 – 50	Chinnor (BP)
	Report

The Haberden
Attendance: 252
Referee: Daniel Collins

11 February 2017
15:00

Canterbury	21 – 17	London Irish Wild Geese (BP)
	Report

The Marine Travel Ground
Attendance: 187
Referee: David Conway

11 February 2017
15:00

Cinderford	23 – 21	Redruth (BP)
	Report

Dockham Road
Attendance: 237
Referee: Claire Hodnett

=== Round 23 ===
18 February 2017
14:00

(BP) Exmouth	32 – 25	Barnes (2BP)
	Report

Imperial Recreation Ground
Attendance: 200
Referee: Shane Lewis

18 February 2017
14:00

(BP) Worthing Raiders	32 – 28	Barnstaple (2BP)
	Report

Roundstone Lane
Attendance: 478
Referee: David Conway

18 February 2017
14:30

Redingensians Rams	25 – 21	Bury St Edmunds (BP)
	Report

Old Bath Road
Attendance: 307
Referee: Graham Cooper

18 February 2017
14:30

(BP) Redruth	17 – 20	Old Elthamians
	Report

The Recreation Ground
Attendance: 830
Referee: Calum Howard

18 February 2017
15:00

(BP) Chinnor	42 – 17	Cinderford
	Report

Kingsey Road
Attendance: 843
Referee: Philip Davies

18 February 2017
15:00

(BP) Henley Hawks	33 – 22	Canterbury
	Report

Dry Leas
Attendance: 415
Referee: Andrew MacNeaney

18 February 2017
15:00

London Irish Wild Geese	12 – 34	Clifton (BP)
	Report

Hazelwood
Attendance: 150
Referee: Alexis Manley

18 February 2017
15:00

Taunton Titans	10 – 39	Bishop's Stortford (BP)
	Report

Hyde Park
Attendance: 625
Referee: Veryan Boscawen

=== Round 19 (rescheduled games) ===
25 February 2017
14:00

(BP) Bishops Stortford	46 – 30	Canterbury
	Report

Silver Leys
Attendance: 443
Referee: Thomas Davies

- Game rescheduled from 21 January 2017.

25 February 2017
14:00

Worthing Raiders	21 – 51	Old Elthamians (BP)
	Report

Roundstone Lane
Attendance: 330
Referee: Phil Davies

- Game rescheduled from 21 January 2017.

25 February 2017
15:00

Henley Hawks	18 – 16	Barnes (BP)
	Report

Dry Leas
Attendance: 215
Referee: Robert Teare

- Game rescheduled from 21 January 2017.

=== Round 24 ===
4 March 2017
14:00

Barnstaple	10 – 3	Barnes (BP)
	Report

Pottingham Road
Attendance: 550
Referee: Alexander Thomas

4 March 2017
14:30

(BP) Bishop's Stortford	53 – 3	London Irish Wild Geese
	Report

Silver Leys
Attendance: 543
Referee: James Clark

4 March 2017
14:30

(2BP) Clifton	27 – 29	Henley Hawks (BP)
	Report

Station Road
Attendance: 129
Referee: David Conway

4 March 2017
14:30

(2BP) Old Elthamians	31 – 34	Chinnor
	Report

College Meadow
Attendance: 667
Referee: Gareth Holsgrove

4 March 2017
15:00

(BP) Bury St Edmunds	33 – 28	Exmouth (2BP)
	Report

The Haberden
Attendance: 331
Referee: Luis Caviglia

4 March 2017
15:00

Canterbury	18 – 29	Redruth (BP)
	Report

The Marine Travel Ground
Attendance: 287
Referee: Alexis Manley

4 March 2017
15:00

Cinderford	12 – 25	Redingensians Rams (BP)
	Report

Dockham Road
Attendance: 215
Referee: Adam Wookey

4 March 2017
15:00

(BP) Worthing Raiders	36 – 33	Taunton Titans (2BP)
	Report

Roundstone Lane
Attendance: 423
Referee: Calum Howard

=== Round 25 ===
11 March 2017
14:00

(BP) Henley Hawks	28 – 38	Bishop's Stortford (BP)
	Report

Dry Leas
Attendance: 285
Referee: Gareth Holsgrove

11 March 2017
14:00

Redingensians Rams	7 – 20	Old Elthamians
	Report

Old Bath Road
Attendance: 174
Referee: Alexis Manley

11 March 2017
14:00

(BP) Redruth	26 – 7	Clifton
	Report

The Recreation Ground
Attendance: 795
Referee: Jack Lewars

11 March 2017
14:00

Taunton Titans	22 – 21	Barnstaple (BP)
	Report

Hyde Park
Attendance: 325
Referee: Adam Wookey

11 March 2017
14:30

(BP) Barnes	31 – 43	Bury St Edmunds (BP)
	Report

Barn Elms
Attendance: 173
Referee: David Clarkson

11 March 2017
14:30

Exmouth	12 – 36	Cinderford (BP)
	Report

Imperial Recreation Ground
Attendance: 212
Referee: Phillip Davies

11 March 2017
15:00

(BP) Chinnor	47 – 3	Canterbury
	Report

Kingsey Road
Attendance: 384
Referee: Robert Bourke

11 March 2017
15:00

(2BP) London Irish Wild Geese	34 – 39	Worthing Raiders (BP)
	Report

Hazelwood
Attendance: 120
Referee: David Conway

=== Round 26 ===
25 March 2017
14:00

Barnstaple	3 – 29	Bury St Edmunds (BP)
	Report

Pottingham Road
Attendance: 550
Referee: Daniel Collins

25 March 2017
14:00

(BP) Bishop's Stortford	32 – 7	Redruth
	Report

Silver Leys
Attendance: 728
Referee: Philip Davies

25 March 2017
14:30

(BP) Clifton	33 – 17	Chinnor
	Report

Station Road
Attendance: 163
Referee: Luis Caviglia

25 March 2017
14:30

(BP) Old Elthamians	97 – 7	Exmouth
	Report

College Meadow
Attendance: 335
Referee: Neil Chivers

25 March 2017
15:00

Canterbury	0 – 15	Redingensians Rams
	Report

The Marine Travel Ground
Attendance: 250
Referee: David Clarkson

25 March 2017
15:00

Cinderford	24 – 14	Barnes
	Report

Dockham Road
Attendance: 205
Referee: David Conway

25 March 2017
15:00

(BP) Taunton Titans	39 – 20	London Irish Wild Geese
	Report

Hyde Park
Attendance: 325
Referee: Shane Lewis

25 March 2017
15:00

(BP) Worthing Raiders	24 – 47	Henley Hawks (BP)
	Report

Roundstone Lane
Attendance: 565
Referee: Robert Bourke

=== Round 27 ===
1 April 2017
14:30

Exmouth	8 – 22	Canterbury
	Report

Imperial Recreation Ground
Attendance: 235
Referee: Adam Wookey

1 April 2017
14:30

(BP) Redingensians Rams	41 – 26	Clifton (BP)
	Report

Old Bath Road
Attendance: 232
Referee: Karl Dickson

1 April 2017
15:00

(BP) Barnes	27 – 50	Old Elthamians (BP)
	Report

Barn Elms
Attendance: 275
Referee: Thomas Davis

1 April 2017
15:00

(BP) Bury St Edmunds	29 – 29	Cinderford (BP)
	Report

The Haberden
Attendance: 502
Referee: Alexis Manley

1 April 2017
15:00

Chinnor	27 – 25	Bishop's Stortford (BP)
	Report

Kingsey Road
Attendance: 1,580
Referee: Gareth Holsgrove

1 April 2017
15:00

(2BP) Henley Hawks	24 – 25	Taunton Titans
	Report

Dry Leas
Attendance: 355
Referee: Jack Lewars

1 April 2017
15:00

(BP) London Irish Wild Geese	5 – 12	Barnstaple
	Report

Hazelwood
Attendance: 200
Referee: Philip Davies

1 April 2017
15:00

(BP) Redruth	33 – 29	Worthing Raiders (2BP)
	Report

The Recreation Ground
Attendance: 780
Referee: Shane Lewis

=== Round 28 ===
8 April 2017
14:30

Barnstaple	21 – 13	Cinderford
	Report

Pottingham Road
Attendance: 740
Referee: Shane Lewis

8 April 2017
14:30

(BP) Clifton	36 – 20	Exmouth
	Report

Station Road
Attendance: 143
Referee: Andrew Wigley

- Exmouth are relegated.

8 April 2017
15:00

(BP) Bishop's Stortford	36 – 33	Redingensians Rams (2BP)
	Report

Silver Leys
Attendance: 886
Referee: Geoffrey Blackburn

8 April 2017
15:00

(BP) Canterbury	11 – 17	Barnes
	Report

The Marine Travel Ground
Attendance: 278
Referee: Jack Lewars

8 April 2017
15:00

(BP) London Irish Wild Geese	41 – 35	Henley Hawks (2BP)
	Report

Hazelwood
Attendance: 140
Referee: David Conway

8 April 2017
15:00

(BP) Old Elthamians	47 – 12	Bury St Edmunds
	Report

College Meadow
Attendance: 360
Referee: Claire Hodnett

8 April 2017
15:00

(BP) Taunton Titans	33 – 33	Redruth (BP)
	Report

Hyde Park
Attendance: 689
Referee: Charlie Gayther

8 April 2017
15:00

Worthing Raiders	14 – 70	Chinnor (BP)
	Report

Roundstone Lane
Attendance: 475
Referee: Daniel Collins

=== Round 29 ===
22 April 2017
14:30

Exmouth	7 – 60	Bishop's Stortford (BP)

Imperial Recreation Ground
Attendance: 368
Referee: Shane Lewis

- Bishop's Stortford are champions.

22 April 2017
14:30

(BP) Redingensians Rams	43 – 27	Worthing Raiders (BP)

Old Bath Road
Attendance: 183
Referee: Daniel Collins

22 April 2017
15:00

(BP) Barnes	47 – 19	Clifton

Barn Elms
Attendance: 253
Referee: Daniel Parrott

22 April 2017
15:00

(BP) Bury St Edmunds	13 – 14	Canterbury

The Haberden
Attendance: 752
Referee: Philip Davies

22 April 2017
15:00

(BP) Chinnor	38 – 29	Taunton Titans (BP)

Kingsey Road
Attendance: 793
Referee: Veryan Boscawen

22 April 2017
15:00

Cinderford	12 – 55	Old Elthamians (BP)

Dockham Road
Attendance: 312
Referee: James Clarke

22 April 2017
15:00

(BP) Henley Hawks	52 – 27	Barnstaple (BP)

Dry Leas
Attendance: 325
Referee: David Conway

22 April 2017
15:00

(BP) Redruth	21 – 22	London Irish Wild Geese (BP)

The Recreation Ground
Attendance: 810
Referee: Jack Lewars

=== Round 30 ===
29 April 2017
15:00

Bishop's Stortford	28 – 21	Barnes (BP)

Silver Leys
Attendance: 1,664
Referee: Alexis Manley

- Barnes are relegated.

29 April 2017
15:00

(BP) Canterbury	33 – 30	Cinderford (2BP)

The Marine Travel Ground
Attendance: 354
Referee: Charles Gayther

29 April 2017
15:00

(2BP) Clifton	30 – 33	Bury St Edmunds (BP)

Station Road
Attendance: 117
Referee: Jack Sutton

29 April 2017
15:00

(BP) Henley Hawks	32 – 26	Redruth (2BP)

Dry Leas
Attendance: 430
Referee: Ian Davies

29 April 2017
15:00

(BP) London Irish Wild Geese	22 – 33	Chinnor (BP)

Hazelwood
Attendance: 200
Referee: Philip Davies

29 April 2017
15:00

(BP) Old Elthamians	68 – 21	Barnstaple

College Meadow
Attendance: 854
Referee: Shane Lewis

29 April 2017
15:00

(BP) Taunton Titans	33 – 32	Redingensians Rams (2BP)

Hyde Park
Attendance: 450
Referee: David Conway

29 April 2017
15:00

(BP) Worthing Raiders	50 – 5	Exmouth

Roundstone Lane
Attendance: 750
Referee: Adam Leal

== Promotion play-off ==
Each season, the runners-up in the National League 2 North and National League 2 South participate in a play-off for promotion to National Division 1. Sale were runners-up in the 2016–17 National League 2 North and because they had a better record than the 2016–17 National League 2 South runners-up, Old Elthamians, they hosted the play-off match.

Team	Pld	W	D	L	PF	PA	PD	TB	LB	Pts
Sale	30	26	0	4	997	487	+510	18	2	124
Old Elthamians (P)	30	25	0	5	1071	533	+538	19	3	122

(P) Promoted

6 May 2017
14:30

Sale	14 – 19	Old Elthamians

Heywood Road
Attendance: 1,297
Referee: Calum Howard

== Attendances ==
- Does not include promotion play-off.

Club	Home Games	Total	Average	Highest	Lowest	% Capacity
Barnes	15	2,336	156	275	45	31%
Barnstaple	15	8,765	584	790	350	29%
Bishop's Stortford	15	8,379	559	1,664	275	35%
Bury St Edmunds	15	5,777	385	752	201	13%
Canterbury	15	4,320	288	423	187	19%
Chinnor	15	8,385	559	1,580	241	28%
Cinderford	15	3,530	235	320	170	9%
Clifton	15	2,258	151	213	78	7%
Exmouth	15	3,600	240	368	150	19%
Henley Hawks	15	5,460	364	845	215	12%
London Irish Wild Geese	15	3,174	212	455	95	11%
Old Elthamians	15	5,968	398	854	163	22%
Redingensians Rams	15	3,598	240	429	96	19%
Redruth	15	11,280	752	870	620	21%
Taunton Titans	15	6,865	458	689	300	23%
Worthing Raiders	15	7,379	492	750	330	33%

== Individual statistics ==
- Note that points scorers includes tries as well as conversions, penalties and drop goals. Appearance figures also include coming on as substitutes (unused substitutes not included). Does not include promotion playoff.

=== Top points scorers ===
Rank	Player	Team	Appearances	Points
1	(England) Tom Banks	Bishop's Stortford	30	323
2	(England) Gary Kingdom	Taunton Titans	30	291
3	(England) Tom White	Old Elthamians	29	290
4	(England) James Moffat	Cinderford	29	257
5	(Wales) Matthew McLean	Worthing Raiders	30	249
6	(England) Jacob Atkins	Redingensians Rams	22	218
6	(England) Tom O'Toole	Barnes	30	214
8	(England) George Jackson	Henley Hawks	24	199
9	(England) Jordan Petherbridge	Barnstaple	27	197
10	(Guyana) Dominic Lespierre	Old Elthamians	30	180

=== Top try scorers ===
Rank	Player	Team	Appearances	Tries
1	(Guyana) Dominic Lespierre	Old Elthamians	30	36
2	(England) George Owen	London Irish Wild Geese	26	25
3	(England) Alex Ducker	Redruth	21	24
4	(England) Nick Hankin	Bishop's Stortford	30	22
5	(England) Guy Hilton	Canterbury	23	18
5	(England) Dan Frost	Taunton Titans	27	18
5	(England) Will Simmonds	Bishop's Stortford	27	18
6	(England) Shaun Buzza	Redruth	25	15
6	(England) James Golledge	Old Elthamians	26	15
6	(England) Jack Rossiter	Redingensians	27	15
6	(England) James Rea	Bishop's Stortford	28	15

== Season records ==
=== Team ===
Largest home win — 76 points

90 - 7 Old Elthamians at home to Exmouth on 25 March 2017

Largest away win — 56 points

70 - 14 Redruth away to Worthing Raiders on 8 April 2017

Most points scored — 90 points

90 - 7 Old Elthamians at home to Exmouth on 25 March 2017

Most tries in a match — 15

90 - 7 Old Elthamians at home to Exmouth on 25 March 2017

Most conversions in a match — 11

Old Elthamians at home to Exmouth on 25 March 2017

Most penalties in a match — 5 (x6)

Exmouth at home to London Irish Wild Geese on 17 September 2016
Cinderford away to Worthing Raiders on 24 September 2016
Canterbury away to London Irish Wild Geese on 22 October 2016
Redingensians Rams away to Old Elthamians on 12 November 2016
Cinderford at home to Worthing Raiders on 14 January 2017
Bury St Edmunds away to Barnes on 11 March 2017

Most drop goals in a match — 1

N/A - multiple teams

=== Player ===
Most points in a match — 29

(England) Gary Kingdom for Taunton Titans at home to Exmouth on 10 September 2016

Most tries in a match — 5

(Guyana) Dominic Lespierre for Old Elthamians at home to Barnstaple on 29 April 2017

Most conversions in a match — 9 (x2)

(England) Bertie Hopkin for Chinnor at home to Exmouth on 8 October 2016
(England) Tom White for Old Elthamians at home to Barnstaple on 29 April 2017

Most penalties in a match — 5 (x6)

(England) George Meadows for Exmouth at home to London Irish Wild Geese on 17 September 2016
(England) James Moffat for Cinderford away to Worthing Raiders on 24 September 2016
(England) Ollie Best for Canterbury away to London Irish Wild Geese on 22 October 2016
(England) Jacob Atkins for Redingensians Rams away to Old Elthamians on 12 November 2016
(England) James Moffat for Cinderford at home to Worthing Raiders on 14 January 2017
(England) Glyn Hughes for Bury St Edmunds away to Barnes on 11 March 2017

Most drop goals in a match — 1

N/A - multiple players

=== Attendances ===
Highest — 1,664

Bishop's Stortford at home to Barnes on 29 April 2017

Lowest — 45

Barnes at home to Worthing Raiders on 17 December 2016

Highest Average Attendance — 752

Redruth

Lowest Average Attendance — 151

Clifton

== See also ==
- English rugby union system
- Rugby union in England
