= Towcestrians Sports Club =

British sports club

Towcestrians
- Full name: Towcestrians Sports Club
- Nicknames: Tows
- Sport: Cricket; Field hockey; Netball; Rugby union; Softball; Tennis
- Founded: 1933; 93 years ago
- Location: Towcester, Northamptonshire, England
- Colors: (Maroon, Gold)
- Website: towcestrians.co.uk

Towcestrians Sports Club (Towcestrians) is an English sports club based in Towcester, Northamptonshire. It was founded in 1933 as a rugby union club, and subsequently extended its scope to cricket, field hockey, netball, tennis, and softball.

The club's colours are maroon and gold.

== History ==
The "Old Towcestrians Rugby Club" was founded in 1933 by old boys of Towcester Grammar School (now Sponne School Technology College). In the following summer, "Old Towcestrians Cricket Club" was formed and included many members from the rugby club in the market town of Towcester.

The two clubs operated independently until the mid-1960s with rugby being played in the centre of Towcester whilst cricket used the school pitch, pavilion, and canteen for teas. In 1967 negotiations were begun with Hesketh Estates regarding the availability of land, and the rugby and cricket committees began work on the constitution for a combined open club.

In February 1968, the joint committees agreed a 30-year lease with Hesketh Estates for 9 acres of land ground off the Greens Norton Road. In March of the same year a special meeting approved the amalgamation of the two clubs into Towcestrians Rugby and Cricket Club under the chairmanship of Colin Waklelin. Although Old Towcestrians Tennis Club originally started in 1925, they joined the new club later in the summer of 1968.

In August 1969, planning approval was granted for the development of the new facilities, and construction work began on the clubhouse and ground. One year later, in August 1970, the new ground was opened.

The Hockey club joined in 1982 and played on a grass pitch till new Hockey rules forced them to play on artificial pitches in Northampton.

As a hub for sports in the South Northamptonshire area, the sports club continues to grow its offering with Towcestrians Softball started in 2014 as Towcester Tigers, and as of 2020, the Sports Club became the home of Towcester Archers.

== Sports ==
=== Rugby ===
Towcestrians
- League: Counties 1 Midlands East (South)
- 2024–25: 3rd

Towcestrians senior rugby consists of Towcestrians 1st XV, 2nds and 3rds with a Mini and Junior Section.

Towcestrians 1st XV play in Counties 1 Midlands East (South). In 2016, Towcestrians 1st XV won the Lewis Shield on 19 April 2016 with a 34–19 win over Bletchley RFC at Franklins Gardens, Northampton.

Up until 2023, Towcester had a ladies' team. Towcester Roses spearheaded women's rugby in the local area, but lost out to other clubs that invested more heavily in the women's game, like local rivals, Buckingham Swans. The team played in the NC3 South Midlands League.

The Mini & Junior Section at Towcestrians caters for young players from the ages of 6 up to 17, organised into year groups with some year groups having more than one team. As one of the biggest in terms of player numbers in Northamptonshire, they are active in player development. This is also supported by being a Northampton Saints affiliate club. Coaching sessions are held on Sunday mornings (10am - 12 noon), games/matches are scheduled throughout the year according to the structured season.

=== Tennis ===
Towcestrians Tennis has three flood-lit all-weather tennis courts offering playing facilities all year round.

The Tennis section of Towscestrians Sports Club has 8 teams playing in both the Northampton and Banbury Leagues, covering a wide range of abilities and ages. With 3 women's teams, 2 men's teams, and 3 mixed teams, there is a strong community.

Towcestrians Tennis Club is affiliated with the Lawn Tennis Association.

=== Cricket ===
Towcestrians Cricket Club was formed in 1934 with many of the original players of the newly formed rugby club. The club moved to the present Greens Norton Road site in 1971 and amalgamated with Greens Norton Cricket Club in 2023. As a successful club, players have gone on to have success in other areas of the sport, including playing with notable players such as Graeme Swann.

The club's outdoor season runs from late April until September, with senior and junior teams competing in local Northamptonshire leagues. Indoor practice is held in January at the County Ground and Sponne School, Towcester.

Facilities include outdoor nets and an artificial wicket.

Towcestrians Cricket Club is affiliated to English and Wales Cricket Board, Steelbacks In The Community, and Northampton & District Youth Cricket League.

=== Hockey ===
Towcestrians Hockey currently have 2 men, 5 lady, juniors and a mixed team.

=== Softball ===
Towcester Tigers backed up by GB player Alex Reynolds. Other notable success for the team was, Laura Simpson has tried for Softball Academy and has been accepted into High Performance Academy, and Youth Sports Trust National Talent Camp as a softball player. She has also been asked to represent GB in the Netherlands in January 2016 at an Indoor softball tournament and selected as eligible for trials for the GB women’s team to play at the world championships in Canada in July.

=== Netball ===
The Netball section at Towcestrians Sports Club is a mixed-ability recreational team that plays in the Towcester Netball League, Wellingborough Netball League, and is affiliated to England Netball.

=== Archery ===
Towcester Archers is a target archery club formed in the summer of 2020.

The section is made up of members of all ages from 8 years old and above, shooting several bow styles. The main ones being Olympic style Recurve, Recurve Barebow, Compound, and traditional bow styles such as Longbow or Flatbow.

Towcester Archers run archery beginners courses run by Archery GB registered coaches and designed to teach the important safety rules and good basic shooting technique.
