= Framland =

Former district of Leicestershire, England

Coordinates: 52°50′N 00°48′W

Framland was a hundred in north-east Leicestershire, England, roughly corresponding to today's borough of Melton. It was recorded in the Domesday Book as one of Leicestershire's four wapentakes.

The name remains in use as a deanery of the Diocese of Leicester in the Church of England.

The original meeting place of the hundred was at Great Framland.
