= List of accidents and incidents involving the English Electric Lightning =

Accidents and incidents involving the English Electric Lightning
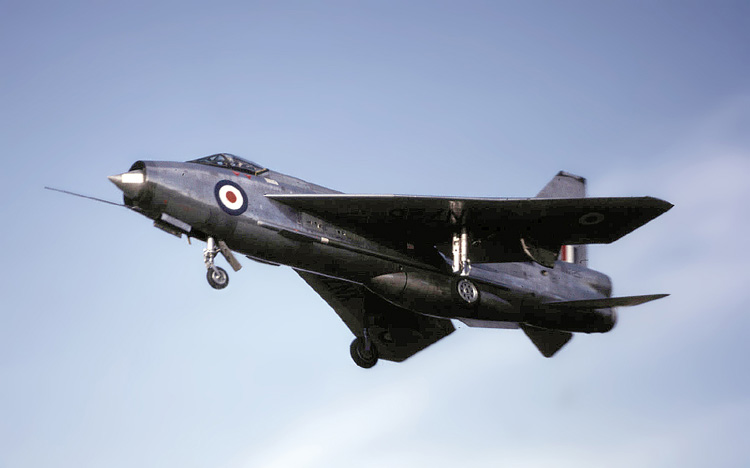

This is a list of accidents and incidents involving the English Electric Lightning twin-engined interceptor and multi-role fighter. The main operator of the Lightning was the Royal Air Force but it was also operated by the Royal Saudi Air Force and the Kuwait Air Force.

== 1950s ==
1959

- 1 October 1959 – Prototype Lightning T4 serial number XL628 was abandoned (Note: To abandon a military aircraft like the Lighting is to leave the aircraft using an ejection seat.) over the Irish Sea after control was lost when the fin collapsed. The test pilot ejected and was initially reported missing until he and his dinghy drifted ashore 28 hours later.

== 1960s ==
1960

- 5 March 1960 – Pre-production Lightning XG334 of the Air Fighting Development Squadron was abandoned when the landing gear jammed and it crashed off Wells-next-the-Sea, Norfolk.
- 16 December 1960 – Royal Air Force Lightning F1 XM138 of the Air Fighting Development Squadron was damaged beyond repair by fire after landing at RAF Coltishall when a fire bottle exploded.

1961

- 28 June 1961 – Lightning F1A XM185 of No. 111 Squadron RAF was abandoned near Lavenham, Suffolk when the landing gear and air brakes jammed.

1962

- 13 September 1962 – pre-production Lightning XG332 operated by de Havilland was abandoned near Hatfield after it caught fire on approach.
- 12 December 1962 – Royal Air Force Lightning T4 XM994 of the Lightning Conversion Flight was destroyed by fire after the landing gear collapsed on landing at RAF Middleton St. George.

1963

- 26 April 1963 – Lighting F1 XM142 of No. 74 Squadron RAF was abandoned off Cromer, Norfolk following hydraulic failure.
- 6 June 1963 – Lighting F1A XM179 of No. 56 Squadron RAF was abandoned after it collided with XM181 over Great Bricett, Suffolk.
- 18 July 1963 – Lightning F1A XM186 of No. 111 Squadron RAF was abandoned in a spin during an aerobatic display near RAF Wittering. The pilot was killed.
- 31 July 1963 – Pre-production Lightning XG311 operated by the Aircraft & Armament Experimental Establishment crashed on a test flight in the Ribble Estuary.

1964

- 25 March 1964 – Lightning F2 XN823 being operated by Rolls-Royce was abandoned after it caught fire on a test flight near Keyham, Leicestershire.
- 27 April 1964 – Lightning F2 XN785 of No. 92 Squadron RAF crashed landed five miles North of RAF Leconfield after running out of fuel. The pilot was killed.
- 9 June 1964 – Lighting F1A XM191 of No. 111 Squadron RAF landed safely but was damaged beyond repair when the engine caught fire on approach to RAF Wattisham.
- 28 August 1964 – Lightning F3 XP704 of No. 74 Squadron RAF stalled and spun into the ground at RAF Leuchars, Fife following an aerobatic display practice. The pilot was killed.
- 11 September 1964 – Lightning F1 XM134, the first production aircraft, of No. 226 Operational Conversion Unit RAF abandoned 30 miles east of Happisburgh, Norfolk when the landing gear leg stuck up.

1965

- 11 January 1965 – Pre-production Lightning XG335 operated by the Aircraft & Armament Experimental Establishment was abandoned and crashed near Woodborough, Wiltshire after the landing gear jammed.
- 26 June 1965 – Lightning F3 XR712 of No. 111 Squadron RAF was abandoned near Watergate Bay, Cornwall after the engine blew up during a display at Exeter.
- 22 July 1965 – Lightning T4 XM966 operated by makers on a test flight crashed into the Irish Sea.
- 29 September 1965 – Lightning F3 XP739 of No. 111 Squadron RAF was abandoned after a double engine flame out near Needham Market, Suffolk.

1966

- 5 January 1966 – Lightning F3 XR721 of No. 56 Squadron RAF belly landed and hit a wall at Helmingham, Suffolk after the engine flamed out. The ejection seat fired but the pilot was killed.
- 15 March 1966 – Lighting F1A XM190 of No. 226 Operational Conversion Unit RAF abandoned following a fire warning north of Cromer, Norfolk.
- 6 May 1966 – Lightning F1A XM213 of No. 226 Operational Conversion Unit RAF veered of runway at RAF Coltishall and hit a fence when the landing gear retracted prematurely during take-off.
- 1 July 1966 – Lightning T5 XS453 of No. 226 Operational Conversion Unit RAF was abandoned near to Happisburgh, Norfolk after the landing gear jammed.
- 22 July 1966 – Lightning F1 XM135, the second production aircraft, took off inadvertently when Walter "Taffy" Holden, an engineer in command of No. 33 Maintenance Unit RAF with limited experience flying small single-engine trainer aircraft, engaged the afterburner by mistake during ground testing. Unable to disengage the afterburner, Holden ran down the runway narrowly missing a crossing fuel truck and a de Havilland Comet taking off, before taking off himself. Flying without a helmet or canopy, the ejection seat and landing gear disabled, Holden aborted a couple of attempted landings. He landed on his third approach, striking the runway with the aircraft's tail as he adopted in his flare the attitude of a taildragger aircraft. The aircraft subsequently returned to service, and was subsequently acquired by the Imperial War Museum Duxford.
- 24 August 1966 – Lightning F3 XP760 of No. 23 Squadron RAF was abandoned after the engine would not relight and the elevators jammed off Seahouses, Northumberland.

1967

- 2 January 1967 – Lightning T4 XM971 of No. 226 Operational Conversion Unit RAF was abandoned two miles east of RAF Coltishall when the loose radar fairing was ingested by the engine.
- 3 March 1967 – Lightning F3 XP699 was abandoned following a fire warning two miles north of Wethersfield.
- 7 March 1967 – Prototype Lightning T55 55–710 for the Royal Saudi Air Force was damaged beyond repair after a landing accident following a test flight at Warton.
- 17 April 1967 – Lightning F1A XM184 of No. 226 Operational Conversion Unit RAF caught fire on landing at RAF Coltishall and was not repaired.
- 7 September 1967 - Lightning F6 XR766 of No. 23 Squadron RAF from RAF Leuchars was abandoned in North Sea, 51 miles ENE of RAF Leuchars official report gives the exact location as being at co-ordinates 56'45".00N, 1'30".00W, pilot successfully ejected and was recovered by a Westland Whirlwind (helicopter) of No. 202 Squadron RAF
- 13 September 1967 – Royal Air Force Lightning F1 XM136 of the Wattisham Target Facilities Flight was abandoned on approach to RAF Coltishall after engine power was lost and the tailplane control jammed.
- 27 September 1967 – Lightning F3 XR714 of No. 111 Squadron RAF hit the runway when the landing gear retracted early on take-off from RAF Akrotiri, Cyprus. The aircraft was not repaired.

1968

- 24 January 1968 – Lightning F6 XS900 of No. 5 Squadron RAF was abandoned six miles south-east of RAF Lossiemouth, Moray when controls jammed following engine fire.
- 29 April 1968 – Lightning F6 XS924 of No. 5 Squadron RAF dived into the ground four miles south-west of RAF Binbrook when controls jammed after take off formating on a Victor tanker with another Lightning for a flypast at RAF Scampton to simulate flight refuelling. The pilot was killed.
- 21 June 1968 – Lightning F1A XM188 of No. 226 Operational Conversion Unit RAF hit a hangar when throttles jammed open while taxiing at RAF Coltishall.
- 4 September 1968 – Lightning F53 53–690 for the Royal Saudi Air Force was abandoned and crashed in the village of Pilling, Lancashire after it caught fire on take-off from Warton.
- 12 September 1968 – Lightning F6 XS896 of No. 74 Squadron RAF caught fire and spun into the ground on approach to RAF Tengah, Singapore. The pilot was killed.
- 29 November 1968 – Royal Air Force Lightning F1A XM174 of the Leuchars Target Facilities Flight was abandoned over the sea following a fire. It crashed at Balmullo Quarry, two miles west of RAF Leuchars.

1969

- 22 September 1969 – Lightning F6 XS926 of No. 5 Squadron RAF was abandoned 75 miles east of Whitby, Yorkshire following loss of control.

== 1970s ==
1970

- 4 March 1970 – Lighting F6 XS918 of No. 11 Squadron RAF was abandoned following a fire nine miles east of RAF Lossiemouth, Moray. The pilot was killed.
- 7 May 1970 – Lightning F3 XP742 of No. 111 Squadron RAF was abandoned off Great Yarmouth, Norfolk after the engine caught fire.
- 26 May 1970 – Lightning F6 XR767 of No. 74 Squadron RAF flew into the sea 50 miles north-west of Singapore. The pilot was killed.
- 27 July 1970 – Lightning F6 XS930 of No. 74 Squadron RAF spun into the ground on take-off from RAF Tengah, Singapore. The pilot and two people on the ground were killed.
- 12 August 1970 – Lightning F6 XS893 of No. 74 Squadron RAF was abandoned 19 miles east of Changi after landing gear jammed.
- 8 September 1970 – Lightning F6 XS894 of No. 5 Squadron RAF flew into the sea six miles north-north-east of Flamborough Head, Yorkshire. The United States Air Force pilot William Schaffner was killed.
- 19 September 1970 – Lighting T4 XM990 of No. 226 Operational Conversion Unit RAF was abandoned after control was lost during a display at Little Plumstead, Norfolk.

1971

- 25 January 1971 – Lightning F3 XP756 of No. 29 Squadron RAF was abandoned after a fire warning off Great Yarmouth, Norfolk.
- 28 January 1971 – Lightning F2 XN772 of No. 92 Squadron RAF was abandoned in a spin near Diepholz, West Germany.
- 28 April 1971 – Lightning F6 XS938 of No. 23 Squadron RAF was abandoned 12 miles east of RAF Leuchars after it caught fire on take-off.
- 3 May 1971 – Lightning F3 XP752 of No. 111 Squadron RAF collided with a French Air Force Dassault Mirage IIIE near Colmar, France. The aircraft landed safely but was relegated to ground training use.
- 10 May 1971 – Lightning F3 XP744 of No. 56 Squadron RAF was abandoned after a fire warning 15 miles west of RAF Akrotiri, Cyprus.
- 26 May 1971 – Lightning F6 XS902 of No. 5 Squadron RAF was abandoned following an engine fire 15 miles north-east of Grimsby, Lincolnshire.
- 8 July 1971 – Lightning F3 XP705 of No. 29 Squadron RAF was abandoned after an engine fire 35 miles south of RAF Akrotiri, Cyprus.
- 22 September 1971 – Lightning F3 XP736 of No. 29 Squadron RAF dived into the sea 40 miles from Great Yarmouth, Norfolk. The pilot was killed and the cause of the crash is not known.
- 30 September 1971 – Lightning F6 XR764 of No. 56 Squadron RAF was abandoned 35 miles south-east of RAF Akrotiri, Cyprus following an engine fire.
- 29 October 1971 – Lightning F3 XR711 of No. 111 Squadron RAF. Reheat was disabled as a fault had occurred on the previous sortie. A "Red Line" entry was made in the F700 indicating a disabled reheat. As it was the last sortie of the day, requiring three aircraft, the aircraft was flown. The other two aircraft took off with reheat. XR711 became airborne briefly but sank back onto the runway with the undercarriage retracted. It is thought that the nozzles opened fully resulting in loss of thrust. It slid down the rest of the Wattisham runway with the ventral tank on fire and engaged the arrester barrier. It came to a halt in a ploughed field at the 06 end of the runway. The pilot Flt Lt Eric Steenson emerged from the aircraft unscathed. The aircraft was declared Cat5 and not repaired.

1972

- 16 February 1972 – Lightning F3s XP698 and XP747 of No. 29 Squadron RAF collided. XP698 crashed into the sea and XP747 was abandoned 60 miles east of Harwich, Essex. The pilot of XP698 was killed.
- 7 August 1972 – Lightning F3 XP700 of No. 29 Squadron RAF caught fire on take-off from RAF Wattisham and crashed at Great Waldingfield, Suffolk. The pilot ejected.
- 6 September 1972 – Lightning T5 XS455 of No. 5 Squadron RAF was abandoned 10 miles north of Spurn Head, Yorkshire following lack of control due to hydraulics failure.
- 14 December 1972 – Lightning T4 XM974 of No. 226 Operational Conversion Unit RAF was abandoned off Happisburgh, Norfolk following engine failure and fire.

1973

- 3 April 1973 – Lightning F6 XS934 of No. 56 Squadron RAF was abandoned 20 miles east of RAF Akrotiri, Cyprus following a fire.
- 5 June 1973 – Lightning T4 XM988 of No. 226 Operational Conversion Unit RAF was abandoned in a spin 23 miles off Great Yarmouth, Norfolk.
- 5 June 1973 – Lightning F3 XR719 of No. 226 Operational Conversion Unit RAF was damaged in a heavy landing at RAF Coltishall, Norfolk and was not repaired.
- 10 December 1973 – Lightning F3 XP738 of No. 111 Squadron RAF made a wheels-up landing at RAF Wattisham and was not repaired.

1974

- 13 February 1974 – Lightning F3 XR715 of No. 29 Squadron RAF was abandoned following a fire warning near Southwold, Suffolk.
- 29 March 1974 – Lighting F3 XP763 of No. 29 Squadron RAF was damaged on the ground and not repaired.
- 3 May 1974 – Lightning T4 of No. 19 Squadron RAF caught fire on the ground at RAF Gutersloh, West Germany.
- 24 June 1974 – Lightning F3 XR748 of No. 111 Squadron RAF was abandoned five miles east of Great Yarmouth, Norfolk following engine failure.
- 29 September 1974 – Lightning F2 XN780 of No. 92 Squadron RAF caught fire on the ground at RAF Gutersloh, West Germany and was not repaired.
- 29 October 1974 – Lightning F6 XR768 of No. 5 Squadron RAF was abandoned 13 miles east of Saltfleet, Lincolnshire following an engine flame out and fire.

1975

- 7 April 1975 – Lightning F3 XR762 of No. 11 Squadron RAF spun into the sea off RAF Akrotiri, Cyprus during a tailchase. The pilot was killed.

1976

- 30 July 1976 – Lightning F6 XS937 of No. 11 Squadron RAF was abandoned off Flamborough Head, Yorkshire after the landing gear jammed.
- 4 August 1976 – Lightning F2 XN786 was damaged by an engine fire at RAF Gutersloh, West Germany and was not repaired.
- 7 September 1976 – Lighting F4 XR766 of No. 23 Squadron RAF was abandoned in a spin 51 miles from RAF Leuchars, Scotland.

1977

- 24 February 1977 – Lightning T4 XM968 of No. 92 Squadron RAF was abandoned following hydraulic failure near RAF Gutersloh.

1979

- 25 May 1979 – Lightning F6 XS931 of No. 5 Squadron RAF crashed into the sea off Flamborough Head, Yorkshire after the controls jammed.
- 17 August 1979 – Lightning F3 XP737 of No. 5 Squadron RAF was abandoned near RAF Valley, Wales after the landing gear jammed in the up position.
- 18 September 1979 – Lightning F3 XR723 of No. 5 Squadron RAF was abandoned 15 miles South of RAF Akrotiri, Cyprus after the engine caught fire.

== 1980s ==
1981

- 23 July 1981 – Lightning F6 XR765 of No. 5 Squadron RAF was abandoned 30 miles east of Spurn Head, Yorkshire after control was lost following an engine fire.

1983

- 26 August 1983 – Royal Air Force Lightning F3 XP753 of the Lightning Training Flight dived into the sea during a flypast at Scarborough, Yorkshire. The pilot was killed.

1984

- 13 July 1984 – Lightning F6 XS920 of No. 5 Squadron RAF hit high tension cables 15 miles north of Hemslingen, Germany during combat practice with a United States Air Force A-10 Thunderbolt. The pilot was killed.
- 8 November 1984 – Lightning F6 XR761 of No. 5 Squadron RAF was abandoned ten miles off Spurn Head, Yorkshire following an engine fire.

1985

- 6 March 1985 – Royal Air Force Lightning F6 XR772 from RAF Binbrook spun into the sea following a loss of control 20 miles north-east of Skegness, Lincolnshire. The pilot was killed.
- 19 September 1985 – Lightning F6 XS921 of No. 11 Squadron RAF was abandoned 50 miles east of Flamborough Head after control failed.

1986

- 15 July 1986 – Lightning F6 XR760 of No. 11 Squadron RAF was abandoned seven miles off Whitby, Yorkshire following an engine fire. Investigation concluded a fuel leak had ignited causing catastrophic damage.

1987

- 19 March 1987 – Royal Air Force Lightning F3 XP707 of the Lightning Training Flight was abandoned in an inverted spin at RAF Binbrook during an aerobatic practice.
- 1 July 1987 – Lightning F6 XR763 of No. 5 Squadron RAF was abandoned on approach to RAF Akrotiri following engine failure after it had ingested a target drogue.

1988

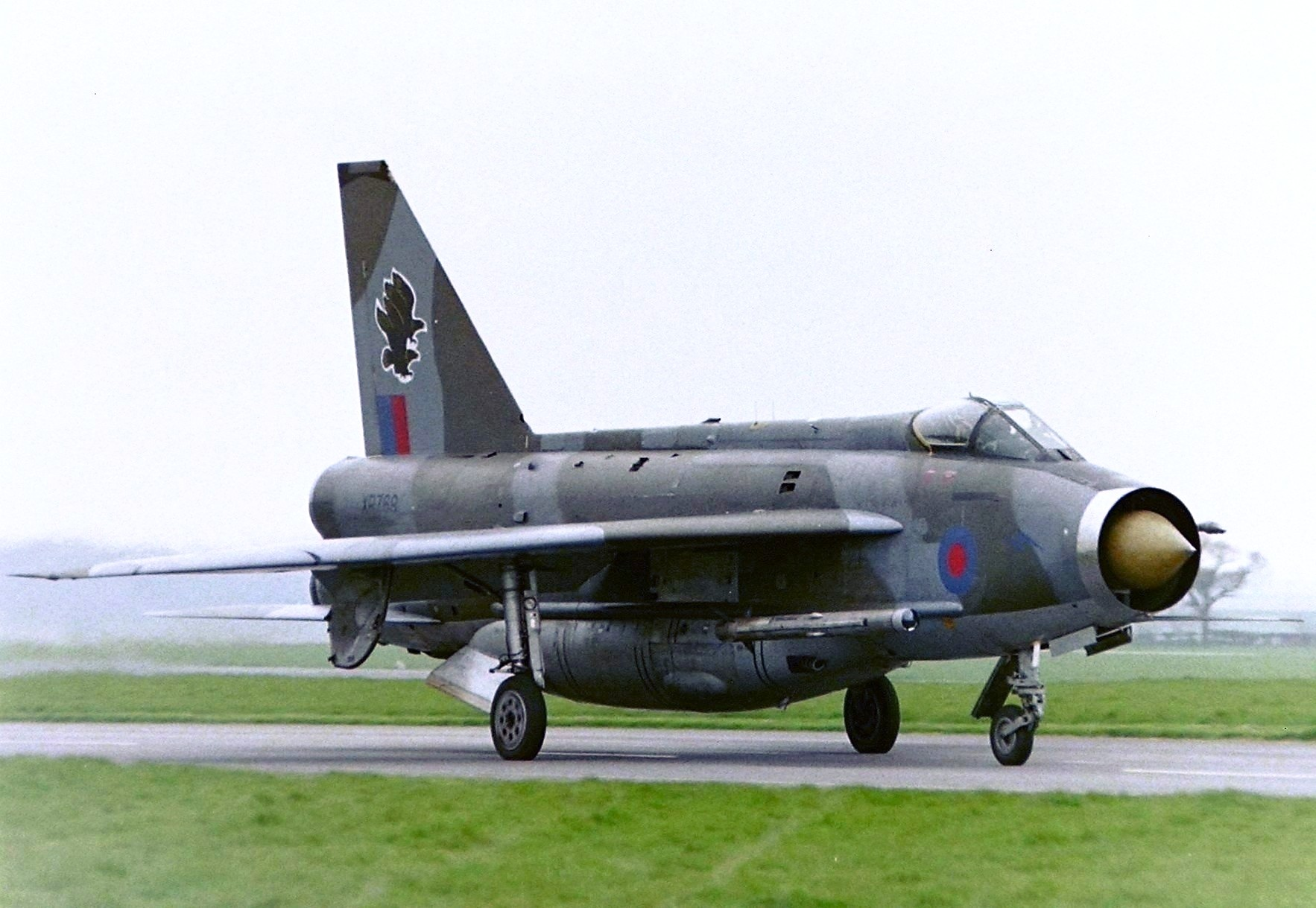
XR769 last taxi on 11 April 1988

- 11 April 1988 – Lightning F6 XR769 of No. 5 Squadron RAF was abandoned five miles off Spurn Head after an engine fire.

== 2000s ==
2009

- 14 November 2009 – Lightning T5 XS451 (registration: ZU-BEX), operated by Thunder City, crashed after an in-flight fire caused a failure of both hydraulic systems during its display at the biennial South African Air Force Overberg Airshow held at AFB Overberg, near Bredasdorp. The pilot Dave Stock was killed due to one of the two canopy front retaining latches failing to release during ejection preventing emergency canopy jettison and inhibiting subsequent firing of the ejection seat. The CAA accident investigation found major shortcomings in the maintenance regime of the aircraft.
