= HM Prison Bure =

Prison in Norfolk, England

Coordinates: 52°45′34″N 1°20′46″E

HMP Bure
- Interactive map of HMP Bure
- Location: Scottow, Norfolk
- Status: Active
- Security class: Adult Male/Category C
- Capacity: 624
- Opened: 30 November 2009
- Managed by: HM Prison Services
- Governor: Simon Rhoden
- Website: Bure at justice.gov.uk

His Majesty's Prison Bure, more commonly known as HM Prison Bure, and often abbreviated to HMP Bure, is a Category C men's prison, located in the parish of Scottow in Norfolk, England. The prison is operated by His Majesty's Prison Service, and became operational in November 2009.

== History ==
Bure Prison was established on part of the domestic site of the former RAF Coltishall. Built during the Second World War, RAF Coltishall was used for night fighters, and then ground attack aircraft. In its latter years, the base was home to the 'Jaguar Force', its pink-painted Jaguars playing a major role in the 1991 Gulf War as part of Operation Granby. Due to defence cuts and reorganisation of the Royal Air Force, the station was formally closed on 30 November 2006.

During January 2007, the Home Office expressed an interest in using the former RAF base. Initially earmarking the site for a new immigration detention facility, by the end of the year media reports suggested the Home Office were planning to establish a new prison at the site. In January 2009, North Norfolk District Council approved plans to establish a Category C prison at the former airbase. In August 2009, it was revealed that the new prison would be used primarily to hold sex offenders, with capacity for around 500 prisoners.

The Ministry of Justice (MoJ) took temporary control of the entire site of the base whilst building works were underway. Most of the prison is housed at part of the domestic site – in the former airmen's H-blocks, along with the junior ranks mess and NAAFI social club of the airbase. New dual perimeter fences have been constructed. Phase one of construction was completed in November 2009, and enabled the prison to hold 259 offenders. Phase two of construction was completed in March 2010, and increased the capacity of the prison to 523.

A new wing Res 7 opened in November 2013 which provides accommodation for an additional 101 offenders increasing the capacity, yet again, to 624. In addition to this increase in accommodation a Regimes area is being built to provide additional activity places.

=== Name ===
The prison's name is taken from the nearby River Bure, and was selected in preference to the names of local towns, such as Aylsham, Coltishall and Wroxham after expressions of concern from parish councils and local government.

== The prison today ==
HMP Bure opened in November 2009. The prison is largely used to hold Category C adult males from the East of England, convicted of sex offences. Residential units for prisoners consist of mainly single-cell accommodation.

Bure's Learning Resource Centre offers various education courses to prisoners, as does the prison's horticulture and recycling departments. Vocational work offered to prisoners includes painting and decorating and industrial cleaning. Other services and organisations which offer support to inmates at the prison include Nacro, Citizens Advice Bureau, Jobcentre Plus and Alcoholics Anonymous.

There is a Prison Visitor Centre operated by the Ormiston Children and Families Trust.

== Notable inmates ==
- John Alford, actor jailed for child sex offences who died whilst a prisoner at HMP Bure in March 2026.
