= Scottow =

Village in Norfolk, England

Coordinates: 52.76100°N 1.37626°E

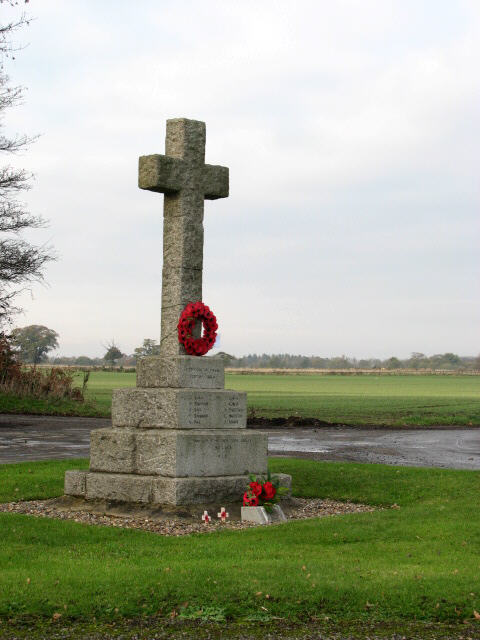
- Scottow War Memorial

- Location within Norfolk
- Area: 8.59 km^{2} (3.32 sq mi)
- Population: 1,424 (2011)
  - Density: 166/km^{2} (430/sq mi)
- OS grid reference: TG279235
- Civil parish: Scottow
- District: North Norfolk
- Shire county: Norfolk
- Region: East
- Country: England
- Sovereign state: United Kingdom
- Post town: NORWICH
- Postcode district: NR10
- Dialling code: 01692
- Police: Norfolk
- Fire: Norfolk
- Ambulance: East of England

Scottow is a village and civil parish in the English county of Norfolk. It is located some 2.5 miles north of Coltishall and 5 miles south of North Walsham.

== Correct pronunciation ==
"Scotter"

== History ==
The villages name means 'Scots' hill-spur'.

The civil parish has an area of 8.59 km^{2} (3.32 sq mi) and in 2001 had a population of 1,774 in 357 households, the population decreasing to 1,424 at the 2011 Census. For the purposes of local government, the parish falls within the district of North Norfolk.

Most of the former Royal Air Force Coltishall military airbase lay within the parish boundaries of Scottow. Today, part of the RAF base has been converted into HMP Bure, a prison for adult males, and the rest has been used to create Scottow Enterprise Park, which is focused on helping businesses to grow through providing space in the form of offices and workshops, as well as business support.

== Governance ==
An electoral ward of the same name exists. This ward stretches east with a total population of 2,934 at the 2011 Census.

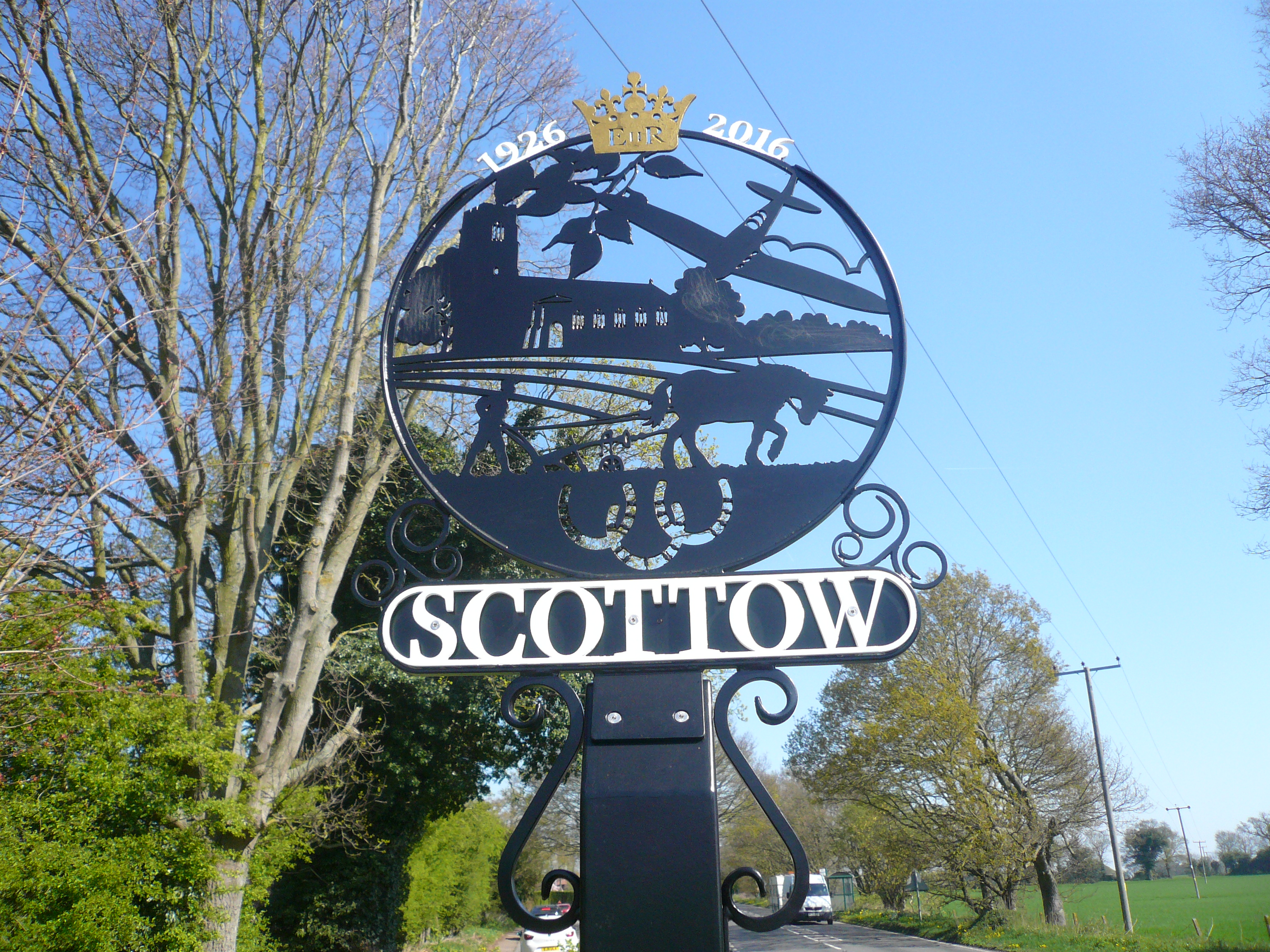
Scottow village sign

== Notes ==
http://kepn.nottingham.ac.uk/map/place/Norfolk/Scottow
