= William Schaffner =

United States Air force officer

Captain William Schaffner (September 11, 1941 – September 8, 1970) was a pilot in the United States Air Force. He disappeared, presumed dead, flying a BAC Lightning over the North Sea while on exchange with the Royal Air Force.

== September 1970 incident ==
In September 1970, Captain Schaffner was an American exchange pilot flying BAC Lightnings with No. 5 Squadron RAF at RAF Binbrook in Lincolnshire, England. Binbrook was one of the bases, along with RAF Coningsby (which flew Phantoms), that was on Quick Reaction Alert. On the evening of September 8, 1970, an object was spotted over the North Sea by radar and he was on duty so he took off to follow the object. His callsign was 'Foxtrot 94'.

The object was then tracked by the early warning station at RAF Fylingdales and by the USAF radar station at Thule Air Base in Greenland and the Cheyenne Mountain Complex radar base in Colorado Springs, Colorado, USA. The Lightning planes were asked to return to their base in Leuchars, and the Phantom planes patrolled the area. At 21.30, the object was picked up on radar again heading south-west over the north of Denmark.

Two Lightning planes were scrambled from RAF Leuchars, to patrol to the north-east of Aberdeen, and two Lightning planes were scrambled from RAF Coltishall. The Strategic Air Command headquarters at Offutt Air Force Base near Omaha, Nebraska was informed of the incident as well as NORAD at Cheyenne Mountain. A Shackleton maritime plane that had been patrolling the Firth of Forth then circled the area around Flamborough Head.

Captain Schaffner took off from Binbrook in the Lightning plane XS894 at 22.06. He had boarded the plane whilst its fuel tanks were still being filled. The plane was armed with two Red Top air-to-air missiles. The object was flying east of Whitby and parallel to the coast. It was tracked by RAF Staxton Wold in North Yorkshire.

=== Retrieval of the crashed Lightning ===
On October 7, 1970, Royal Navy divers located the plane on the sea bed. The plane was recovered from the sea three months later and was remarkably intact. The canopy was closed but the body of Captain Schaffner was not found. The wreckage was taken back to RAF Binbrook for investigation. Normally this would have happened at the MOD Crash Investigation Branch, part of the Royal Aircraft Establishment (now the Air Accidents Investigation Branch) at Farnborough.

=== September 2014 magazine contribution ===
In a letter to the aviation magazine FlyPast a retired RAF Sqn Ldr states that his aircraft (Avro Shackleton Mk.III WR981) was the 'Object' tracked by the various radar stations, and the incident was part of a much larger TACEVAL (station TACtical EVALuation) exercise. Two Lightnings were involved. The first made four approaches on the Shackleton, before departing the area while the second started an approach (flown by Capt Schaffner), before breaking off to starboard. It never re-established contact and the Shackleton crew assumed that it had returned to base, until they were alerted by Uxbridge Centre on the guard frequency, requesting that they begin a search and rescue operation using the call sign Playmate 51.
