= No. 226 Operational Conversion Unit RAF =

No. 226 Operational Conversion Unit RAF

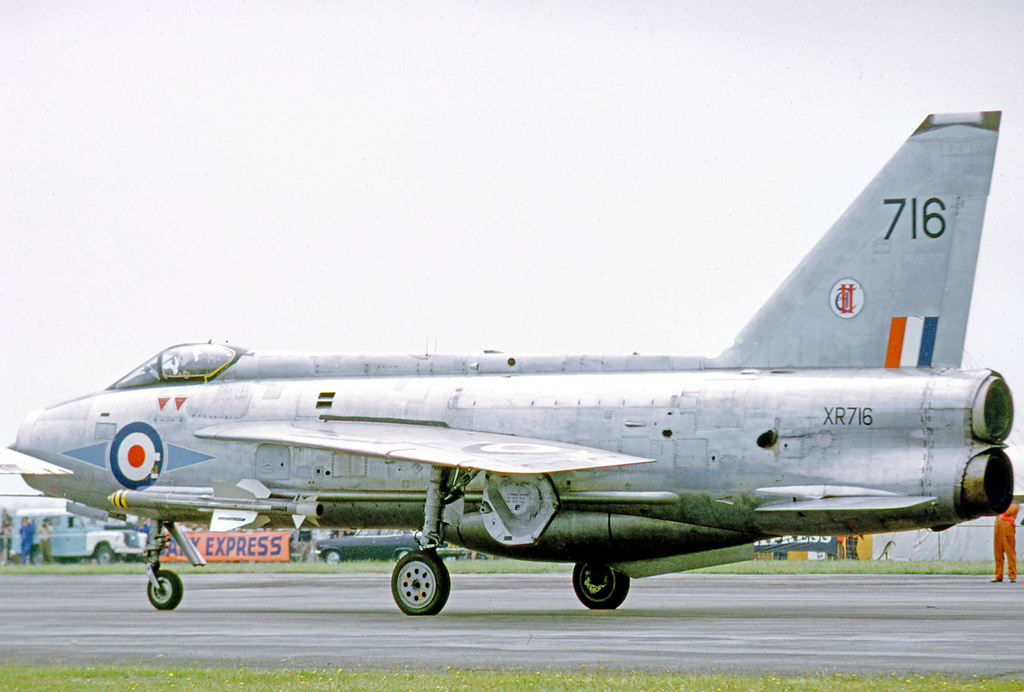
- English Electric Lightning F.3 of 226 OCU at Woodford Airfield, Cheshire, in June 1973
- Active: 1946-1949; 1949-1955; 1963-1974; 1974-1991 (Last Formation)
- Disbanded: 11 September 1991
- Country: United Kingdom
- Branch: Royal Air Force
- Type: Operational Conversion Unit
- Role: Fighter training
- Last base: RAF Lossiemouth

No. 226 Operational Conversion Unit was a Royal Air Force Operational Conversion Unit which was active between 1946 and 1991.

== Operational history ==
It was first formed on 15 August 1946 at RAF Molesworth under No. 11 Group of Fighter Command by redesignation of No. 1335 Conversion Unit with the mission of training fighter pilots. The unit operated a variety of aircraft, as befitted its general fighter pilot training mission. Those aircraft included the Gloster Meteor, Hawker Tempest, de Havilland Hornet and de Havilland Vampire.

226 OCU then relocated to RAF Bentwaters, Suffolk on 10 October 1946, training pilots for day fighter and fighter-reconnaissance roles consisting of four flights of de Havilland Hornet F.1, Hawker Tempest II, de Havilland Vampire FB.1 and Gloster Meteor F.3 and F.4. Later Meteor two seat F.8 trainers were added. Students trained on only one type during the course and did not fly other aircraft other than the Avro Anson I for twin engine familiarisation and the squadron North American Harvard I. At that time it was directed from Fighter Command Headquarters, Bentley Priory, via 11 Fighter Group at Hillingdon.

On 31 August 1949 220 OCU moved to RAF Driffield in Yorkshire where it disbanded for the first time by being redesignated as No. 203 Advanced Flying School.

The following month, On 1 September 1949, the unit was resurrected at RAF Stradishall and No. 226 OCU's service began a new chapter. In No. 12 Group, again in Fighter Command, the unit had the more specific mission of training Meteor pilots. This lasted until 3 June 1955 when the unit was disbanded for a second time while under 11 Group command.

Continuing the tradition of training fighter pilots, the OCU reformed on 1 June 1963 at RAF Middleton St George, flying the English Electric Lightning with the merging of the Lightning Conversion Squadron and the Fighter Command Instrument Rating Squadron. It moved to RAF Coltishall on 20 April 1964. During 1968 and 1969, the OCU was involved in the training of pilots of the Royal Saudi Air Force in flying their newly acquired Lightnings. On 30 September 1974, it was disbanded at RAF Coltishall.

The next area where 226 OCU saw service was Scotland. Shifting to strike aircraft, 226 OCU reformed at RAF Lossiemouth the day after disbandment from the Jaguar Conversion Unit, originally established in June 1974. Its peacetime role was training pilots for the SEPECAT Jaguar. Less well known was 226 OCU's wartime emergency role as a 'shadow squadron' or reserve unit made up principally of the squadron's instructors. From 1975 until 1991 the unit's wartime role was as an operational squadron in the front line assigned to Supreme Allied Commander Europe (SACEUR) with twelve Jaguar aircraft, eight WE.177 nuclear bombs, and a variety of conventional weapons. In a high-intensity European war the unit's role was to support land forces on the Continent, first with conventional weapons and secondly with tactical nuclear weapons as required, should a conflict escalate to that stage. The apparent mismatch between aircraft numbers and nuclear bombs was a consequence of RAF staff planners concluding that there would be one-third attrition of aircraft in an early conventional phase, leaving the remaining survivors numerically strong enough to deliver the unit's entire stockpile of eight nuclear bombs.

With the post-Cold War drawdown of the RAF the OCU fell victim to defence cuts in 1991 and was disbanded for the last time by redesignation to No. 16 (Reserve) Squadron on 11 September 1991, although the redesignated unit continued with both its peacetime and wartime roles exactly as before, in its new guise as No. 16 (Reserve) Squadron until retirement of the WE.177 weapon.

== See also ==
- List of conversion units of the Royal Air Force
