= Holden's Lightning flight =

Unintended aircraft takeoff

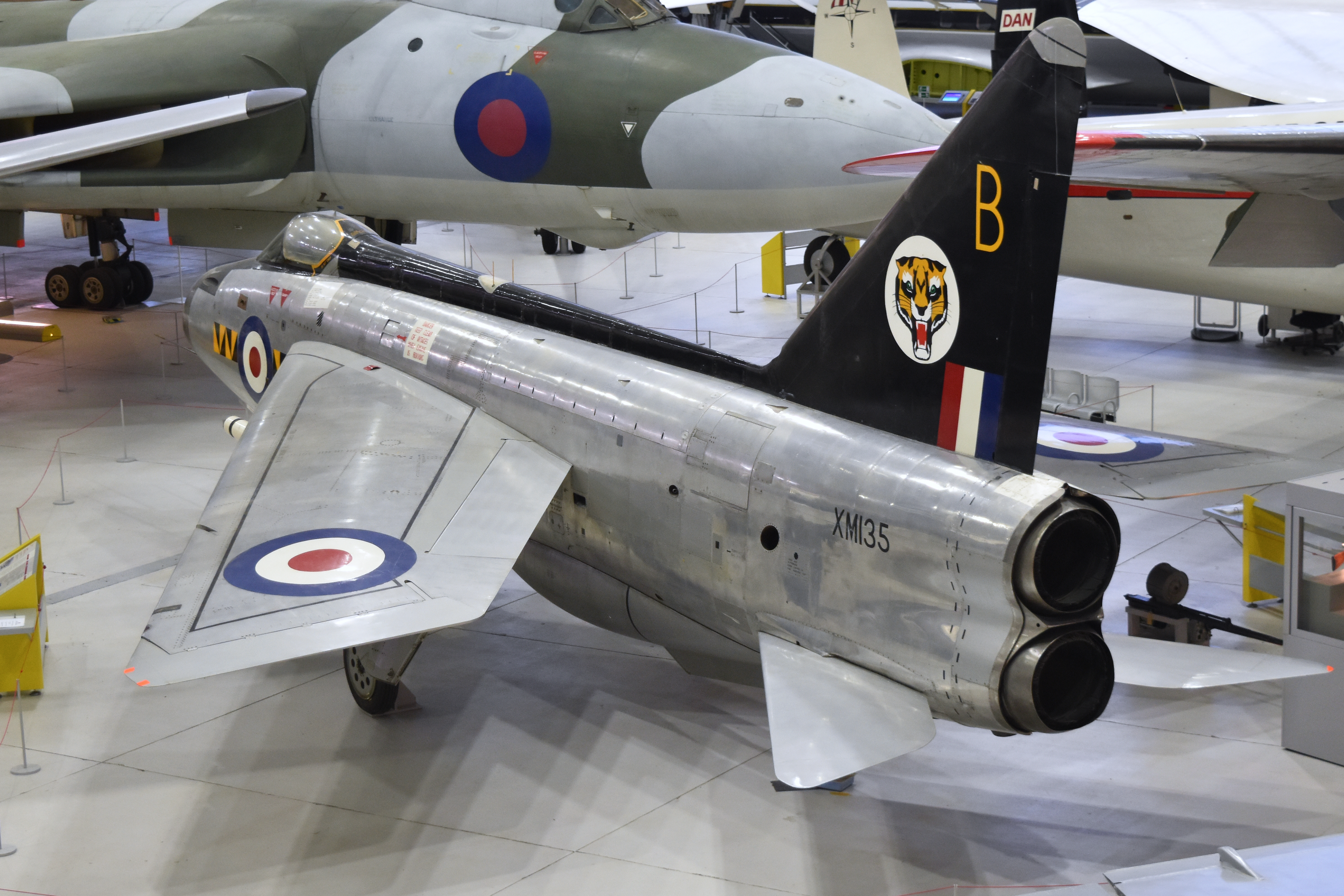
- XM135 at Imperial War Museum Duxford

Incident
- Date: 22 July 1966
- Summary: Unqualified person takes off after engaging afterburner by mistake during ground test
- Site: RAF Lyneham

Aircraft
- Aircraft type: English Electric Lightning F.1
- Operator: RAF Maintenance Command
- Registration: XM.135
- Flight origin: RAF Lyneham
- Destination: RAF Lyneham
- Occupants: 1
- Crew: 1
- Fatalities: 0
- Survivors: 1

On 22 July 1966, Walter "Taffy" Holden, a 39-year-old engineer in command of No. 33 Maintenance Unit RAF with limited experience flying small single-engine trainer aircraft, inadvertently engaged the afterburner of a Mach 2.0–capable English Electric Lightning during ground testing at RAF Lyneham. Unable to disengage the afterburner, Holden ran down the runway, narrowly missing a crossing fuel bowser and a de Havilland Comet taking off, before taking off himself. Flying without a helmet or canopy, the ejection seat disabled, and the landing gear locked down, Holden aborted his first two landing attempts. He landed on his third approach, striking the runway with the aircraft's tail as he adopted the landing technique of a taildragger aircraft. The aircraft returned to service, and was subsequently acquired by the Imperial War Museum Duxford.

== Aircraft ==
The English Electric Lightning was a high-performance short-range interceptor aircraft. The Lightning had a max takeoff weight of 20 tons, and could reach Mach 2.0. The aircraft involved in the incident was the second production Lightning, designated XM135. XM135 was suffering from an electrical fault that would only manifest during acceleration for takeoff; the electrical inverter supplying power to flight instruments would cut out during the first yards of the takeoff, and the standby inverter would switch in.

== Crew ==
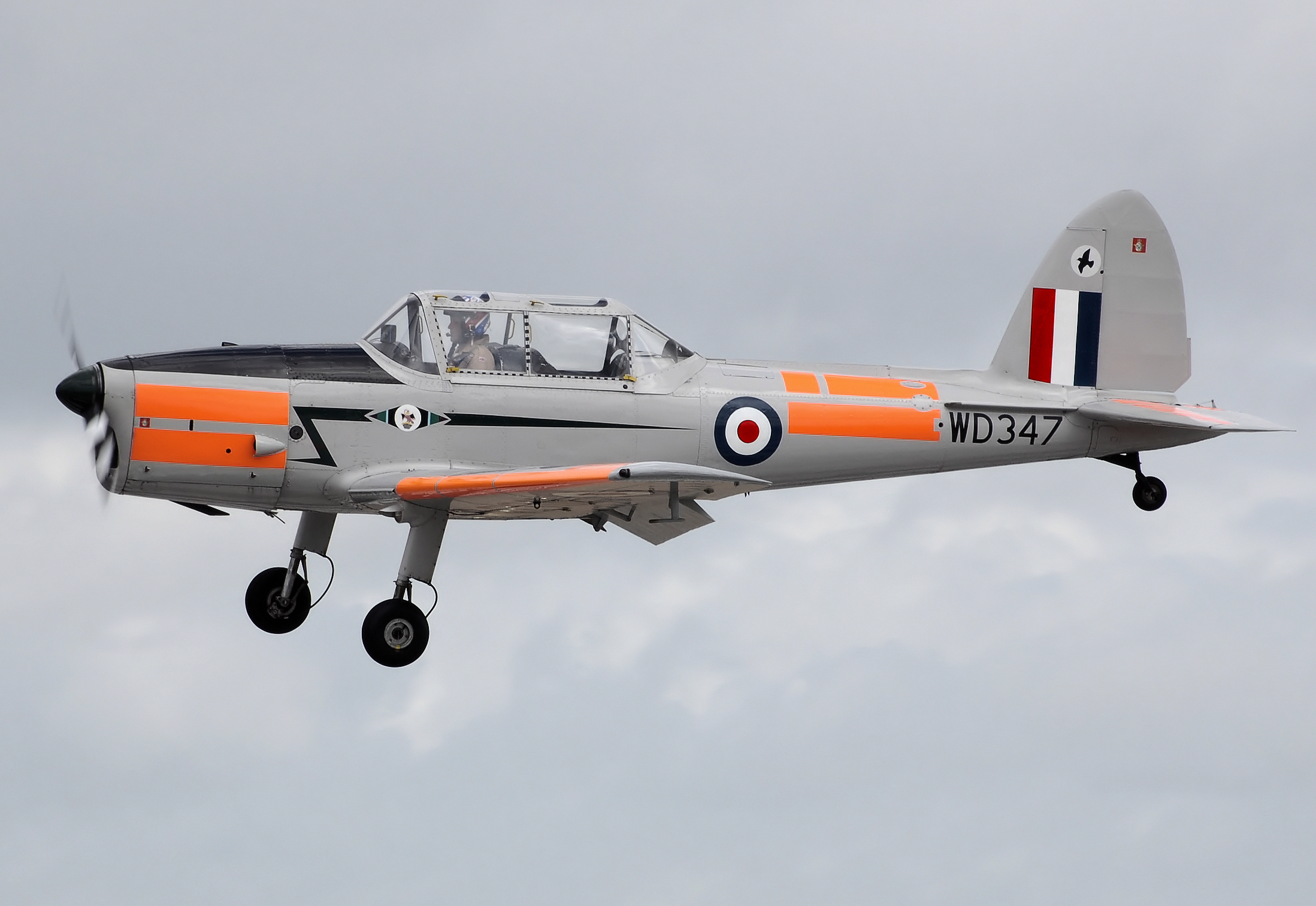
A de Havilland Canada DHC-1 Chipmunk similar to that in which Holden had some practice flights

Wing Commander Walter "Taffy" Holden enlisted in 1943, gaining a cadetship to a university. Studying mechanical engineering, Holden also learnt to fly on the de Havilland Tiger Moth biplane. Holden pursued an engineering career with the RAF who qualified him with pilot wings after training on the Harvard. He subsequently practised on the de Havilland Canada DHC-1 Chipmunk during his early career.

In 1966, Holden was in command of No. 33 Maintenance Unit RAF at RAF Lyneham who maintained Gloster Meteors, English Electric Canberras, and English Electric Lightnings. At the time, the unit was in the process of winding down and was disposing of its last aircraft. The unit had a test pilot on staff for its Canberras and Meteors, but that pilot was not qualified for the Lightning. For Lightning flights, Holden had to locate RAF test pilots with a current rating who could usually be found within 24 to 36 hours.

== Flight history ==
The troubles with aircraft XM135 were holding up the closure of the unit, and at the time of the incident, no test pilot was available for another week. A pilot from RAF Boscombe Down, who was involved in previous tests, suggested Holden perform the test himself because it involved only ground taxiing for 30 to 40 yards (27 to 37 m) at a time. For each test, Holden was to test a different electrical configuration, rev up the engine to high RPMs, then cut the engine and apply the brakes. Holden was to communicate by hand signals with his support crew on a Land Rover, which would coordinate the next test with the control tower.

Holden was not wearing a helmet and had no radio. The canopy of the aircraft was removed for the electrical wires running out of the cockpit. The landing gear was locked in a down position in a test mode.

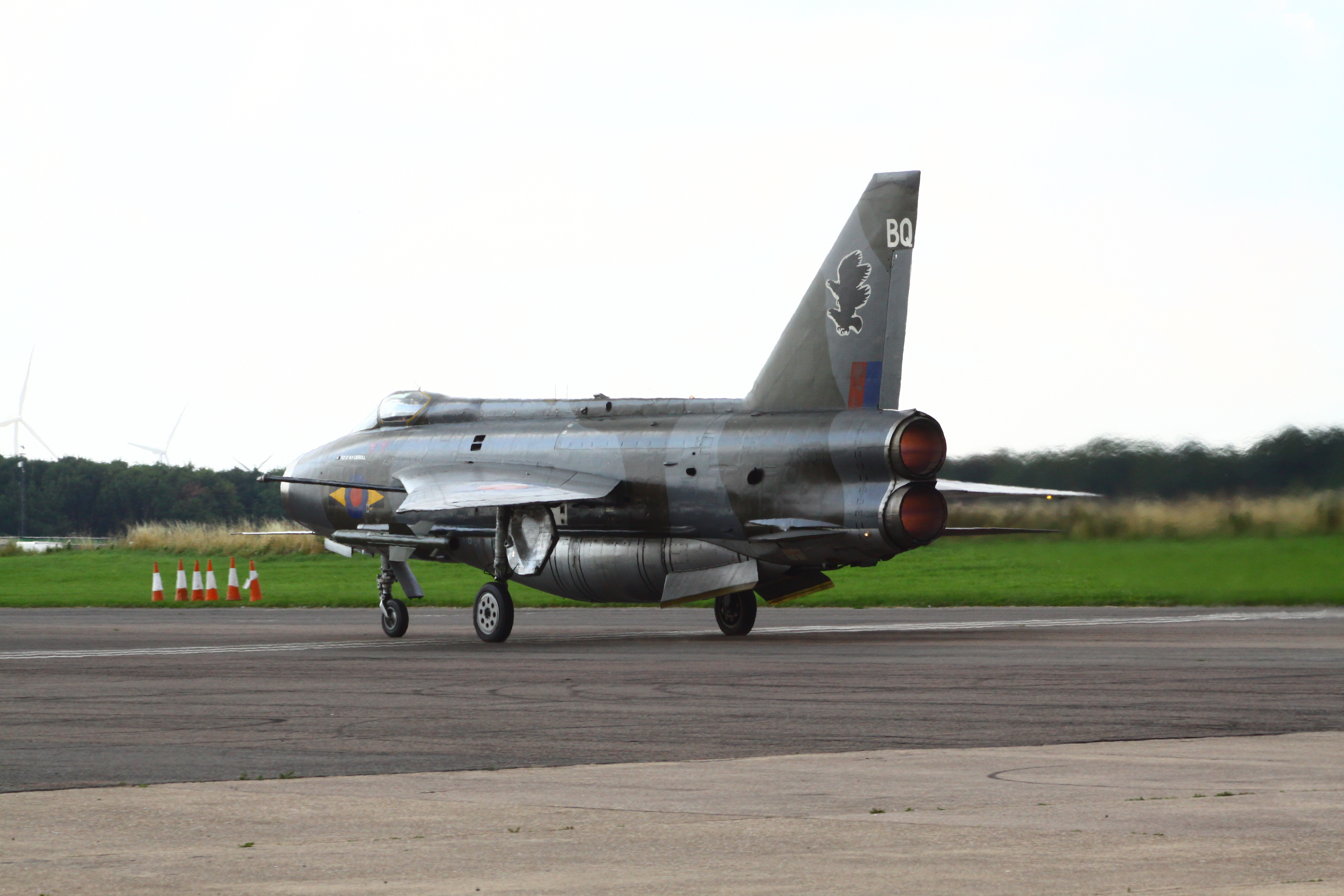
Lightning with afterburners engaged

After the Lightning was in position, Holden carried out the first test as expected, moving the aeroplane 30–40 yards. However, in a subsequent test, Holden unintentionally pushed the throttle past the afterburner gate. Once the afterburner was engaged, disengaging it required pushing the gate keys behind the throttle, which Holden was inexperienced in operating. The Lightning gained speed quickly and just missed a fuel tanker that was crossing the runway in front of Holden. The Lightning crossed the main runway as a mid-takeoff de Havilland Comet passed over the Lightning. Holden was then running out of runway, so he pulled the stick back and took off.

Following takeoff, Holden managed to disengage the afterburner after feeling for the gate keys. Holden considered ejecting; however, that was not possible because the ejection seat was in inert ground mode. On his first two landing attempts, his speed and height were wrong and Holden aborted both. Holden, who vaguely recalled that the landing speed for the Lightning was 150 knots (280 km/h; 170 mph), took a wide circuit around Lyneham and attempted to land in the opposite direction of the runway, running away from the village. In Holden's final flare, he adopted the attitude used in a taildragger aircraft of his earlier training. This resulted in a tailstrike, the rubber tail bumper of the Lightning hitting the concrete, breaking, and detaching the cable of the drogue parachute used for assisting braking. Braking hard, Holden managed to bring the Lightning to a stop about one hundred yards (91 m) before the end of the runway. Holden was airborne for 12 minutes.

== Aftermath ==
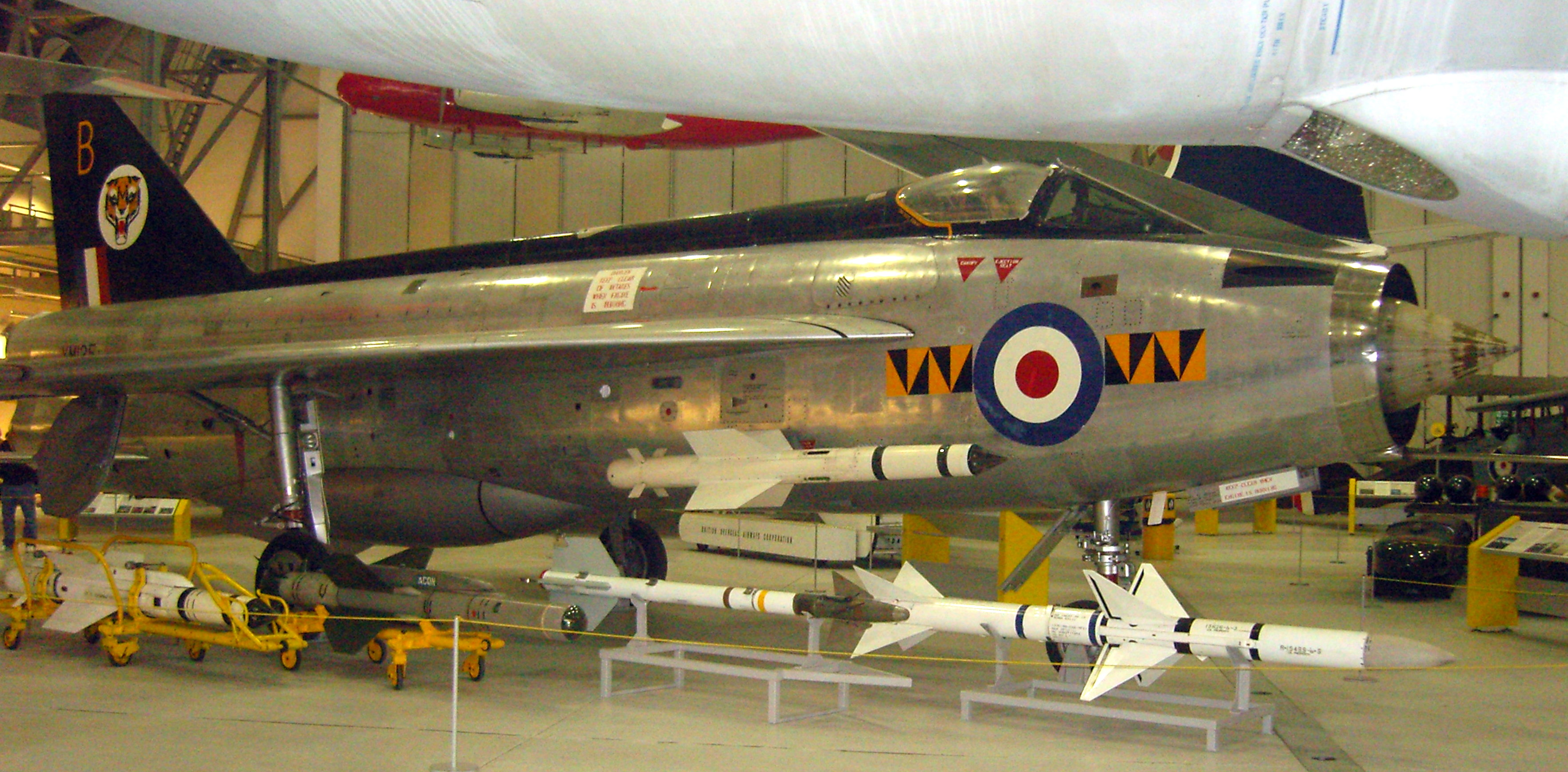
XM135 at Imperial War Museum Duxford

The aircraft was repaired and returned to service. The electrical fault was determined to be caused by wires left in place from a deleted ground test button for the standby inverter, which shorted into the UHF radio which moved on its trunnions during the takeoff run. After flying for 1343 hours, XM135 was acquired in 1974 by the Imperial War Museum Duxford, where it is on display.

The inadvertent flight was impossible to hide from the press since the base was filled with civilian contractors. Holden was sent to Italy on leave when the news broke; however, he was recognised there as well. An inquiry confirmed that Holden had not acted against any orders in the Flight Order Book (though these orders were subsequently amended) and that Holden had saved himself and the aircraft. According to Holden, in a review before Air Marshal Kenneth Porter, he was asked whether he agreed that "With the limited flying experience I had, the test would have been better left to an experienced and current Lightning test pilot", which he answered in the affirmative, following which Porter related some of his own unfortunate flying incidents. Holden remained in RAF service and retired in the late 1970s / early 1980s.

Holden died in 2016, aged 90.
