= No. 5 Squadron RAF =

Defunct flying squadron of the Royal Air Force

No. V (AC) Squadron RAF
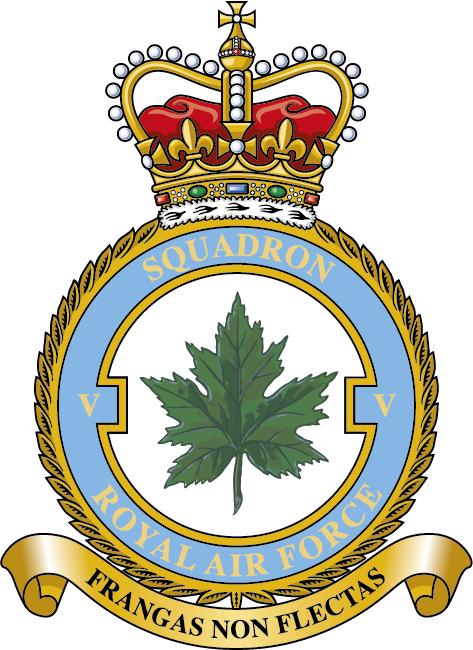
- Squadron badge
- Active: 1913–1918 (RFC); 1918–1920; 1920–1947; 1949–1951; 1952–1957; 1959–1965; 1965–2002; 2001–2021
- Disbanded: 31 March 2021
- Country: United Kingdom
- Branch: Royal Air Force
- Type: Flying squadron
- Mottos: Frangas non flectas (Latin for 'Thou mayst break, but shall not bend me')

Insignia
- Roundel
- Tail codes: QN (Apr 1939 – allocated but possibly not used); OQ (Sep 1939 – Feb 1941, Mar 1946 – Aug 1947); B (Mar 1952 – 1955); A (Aug 1986 – Dec 1987); CA–CZ (Tornado F3)

Number 5 (Army Co-operation) Squadron also known as No. V (Army Cooperation) Squadron is a dormant squadron of the Royal Air Force. It most recently operated the Raytheon Sentinel R1 Airborne Stand-Off Radar (ASTOR) aircraft from RAF Waddington, Lincolnshire, between April 2004 until March 2021.

First formed in July 1913, the squadron served throughout the First World War, holding the distinction of gaining the first loss and kill for the Royal Flying Corps. No. 5 Squadron relocated to India in 1920 where it remained during the Second World War. During the Cold War, No. 5 (Fighter) Squadron operated in the interceptor role, flying the English Electric Lightning and later the Panavia Tornado F3.

== History ==
=== Formation and First World War (1913–1919) ===
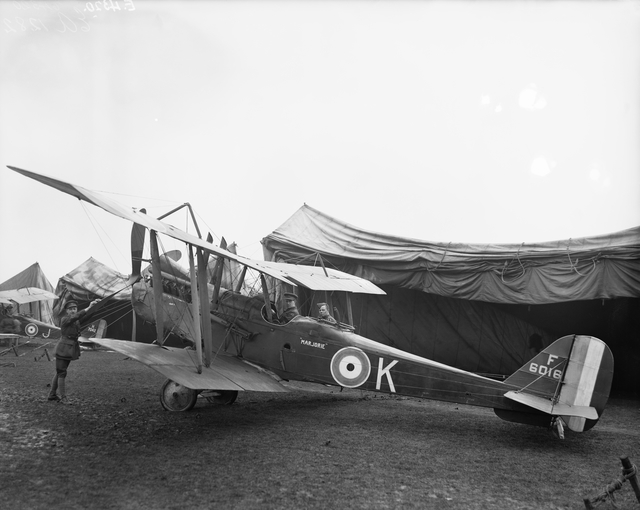
A Royal Aircraft Factory R.E.8, similar to what No. V Squadron flew between May 1917 and March 1918

No. 5 Squadron of the Royal Flying Corps (RFC) was formed at Farnborough, Hampshire on 26 July 1913, from members of No. 3 Squadron. The squadron moved to Netheravon on 28 May, Fort Grange, Gosport on 6 July, then Swingate Down on 14 August. Following the outbreak of the First World War, No. 5 Squadron deployed to France on 15 August 1914, equipped with a variety of aircraft to carry out reconnaissance for the British Expeditionary Force. It flew its first missions on 21 August and on the next day, an Avro 504 of No. 5 Squadron was the first British aircraft to be shot down, its crew of pilot Second Lieutenant Vincent Waterfall and navigator Lieutenant Charles George Gordon Bayly being killed over Belgium. On 24 August, the squadron became the first unit in the RFC to shoot down an enemy aircraft with gunfire when Lieutenant Wilson and Lieutenant Rabagliati shot down a German Etrich Taube near Le Cateau-Cambrésis in France.

From 24 March until 7 April 1917, the squadron was based at La Gorgue in northern France.

No. 5 Squadron standardised on the Royal Aircraft Factory B.E.2, specialising as observers for artillery, re-equipping with the Royal Aircraft Factory R.E.8 in May 1917, and working closely with the Canadian Corps, through to the end of the war and into 1919, when it moved into Germany as part of the Army of Occupation. Its association with the Canadian Corps led to the incorporation of a maple leaf in the squadron's badge when it was approved in June 1937.

=== Interwar years (1919–1938) ===
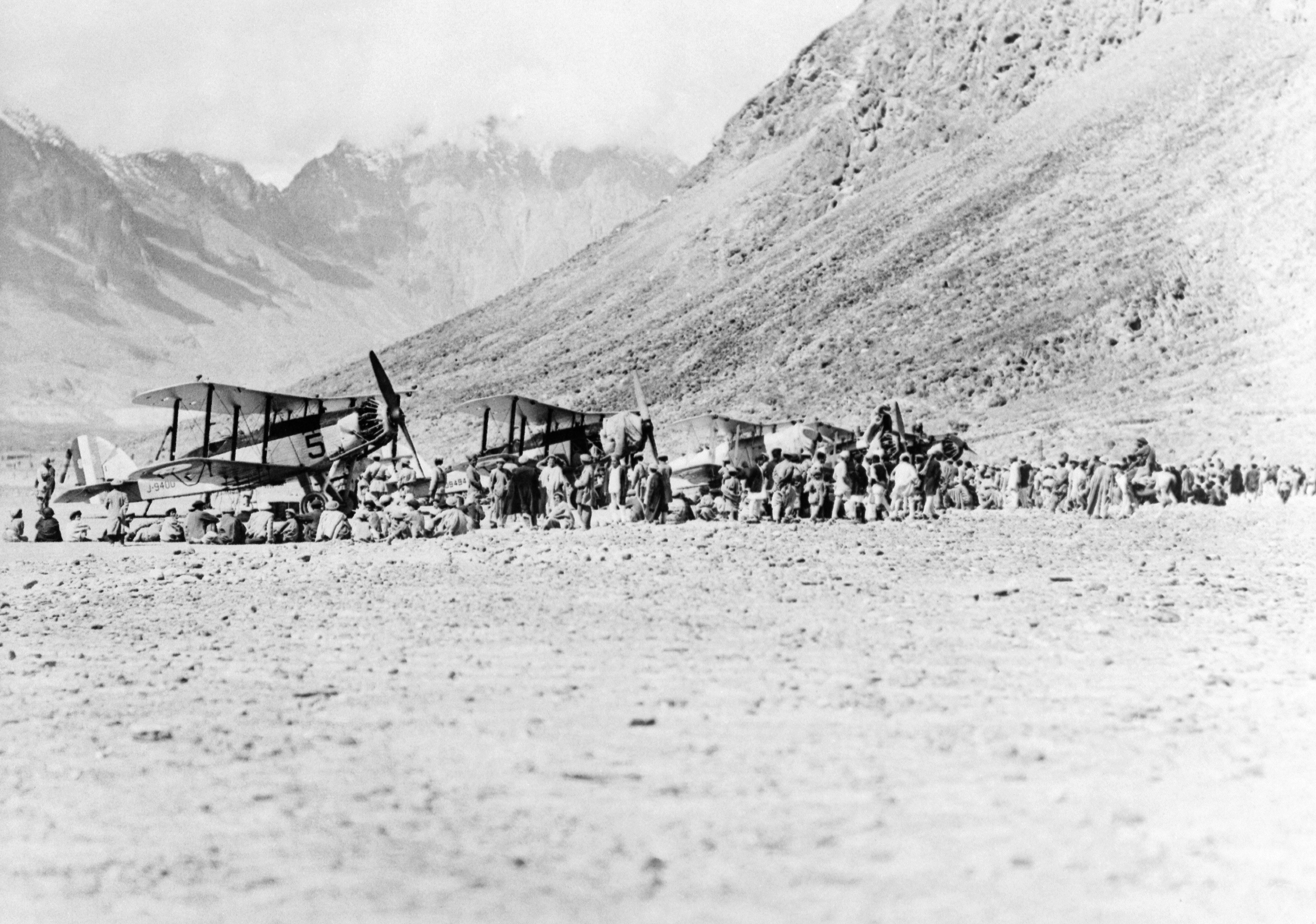
Westland Wapiti Mk.IIas, similar to what No. 5 Squadron operated in India between May 1931 and June 1940

The squadron returned to the UK in September 1919, before disbanding on 20 January 1920. It reformed at Quetta, British India (now part of Pakistan) on 1 April 1920, when No. 48 Squadron was renumbered. There it continued working in Army Air Cooperation for operations on the North West Frontier. Upon reformation, the unit was equipped with the Bristol F.2B Fighter which were flown up until 1931. In May 1931, No. 5 Squadron began to convert to the Westland Wapiti Mk.IIa.

=== Second World War (1939–1945) ===
At the outbreak of Second World War in September 1939, No. 5 Squadron were based at Fort Sandeman in Pakistan, still equipped with the Westland Wapiti biplane. The squadron became a light bomber unit when it converted to the Hawker Hart in June 1940. No. 5 Squadron converted again to the Hawker Audax in February 1941, using it as a fighter. In December 1941, the squadron relocated to RAF Dum Dum, Calcutta, and began to receive their first monoplane – the American-built Curtiss Mohawk Mk.IV. Posted to RAF Dinjan, Assam, in May 1942, No. 5 Squadron were tasked with escorting Bristol Blenheim bombers over north west Burma.

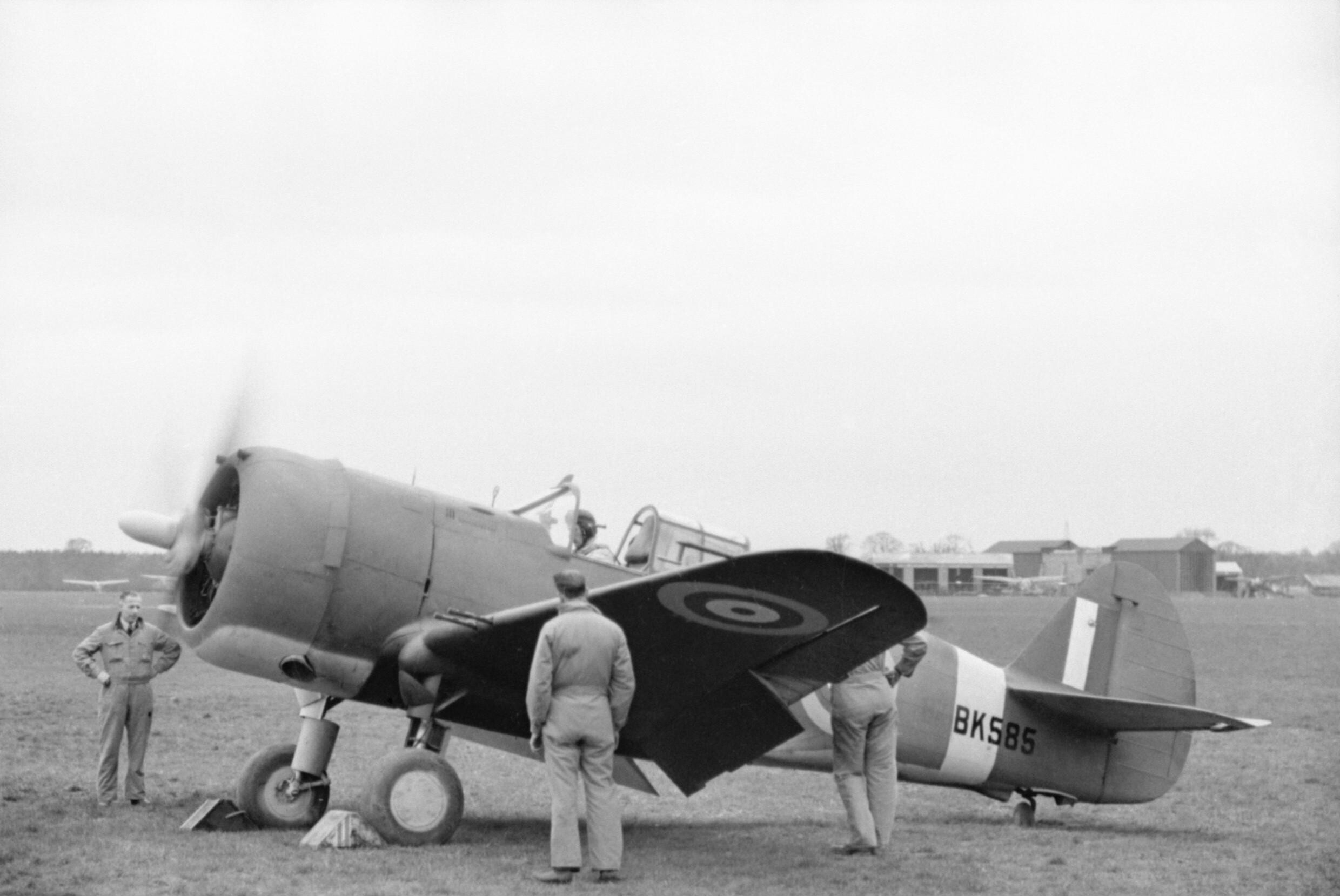
A Curtiss Mohawk Mk.IV at A&AEE Boscombe Down which later joined No. 5 Squadron in 1941

The Mohawks were replaced by the Hawker Hurricane Mk.IIc and Mk.IId in June 1943 while the squadron was based at RAF Kharagpur. In September 1944, No. 5 Squadron converted to the Republic Thunderbolt Mk.I and Mk.II. In May 1945, the squadron was withdrawn from the front line in preparation for the liberation of Malaya from Japanese occupation, however this was never carried out due to the Japanese Empire surrendering on 15 August 1945.

=== Cold War (1946–1965) ===
Remaining in India, No. 5 Squadron converted to Hawker Tempest F.2 in February 1946, but disbanded on 1 August 1947 due to the Partition of India. On 11 February 1949, the squadron reformed at RAF Pembrey in Wales for target-towing duties when No. 595 Squadron was renumbered, however the squadron was shortly disbanded on 25 September 1951. The squadron was reformed at RAF Wunstorf, West Germany, on 1 March 1952, and were equipped with the de Havilland Vampire F.5. No. 5 Squadron converted over to the de Havilland Venom FB.1 in December 1952. The 1957 Defence White Paper saw the disbandment of the squadron on 12 October 1957 while operating the Venom FB.5.

On 20 January 1959, the squadron was reformed as a night fighter unit at RAF Laarbruch, West Germany, flying the Gloster Meteor NF.11. No. 5 Squadron began converting to the delta winged Gloster Javelin FAW.5 in January 1960. When No. 33 Squadron was disbanded on 17 December 1962, No. V Squadron was allocated the former unit's Javelin FAW.9, along with crew members. No. 5 Squadron itself was disbanded on 7 October 1965 at RAF Geilenkirchen.

=== Lightning and Tornado (1965–2003) ===
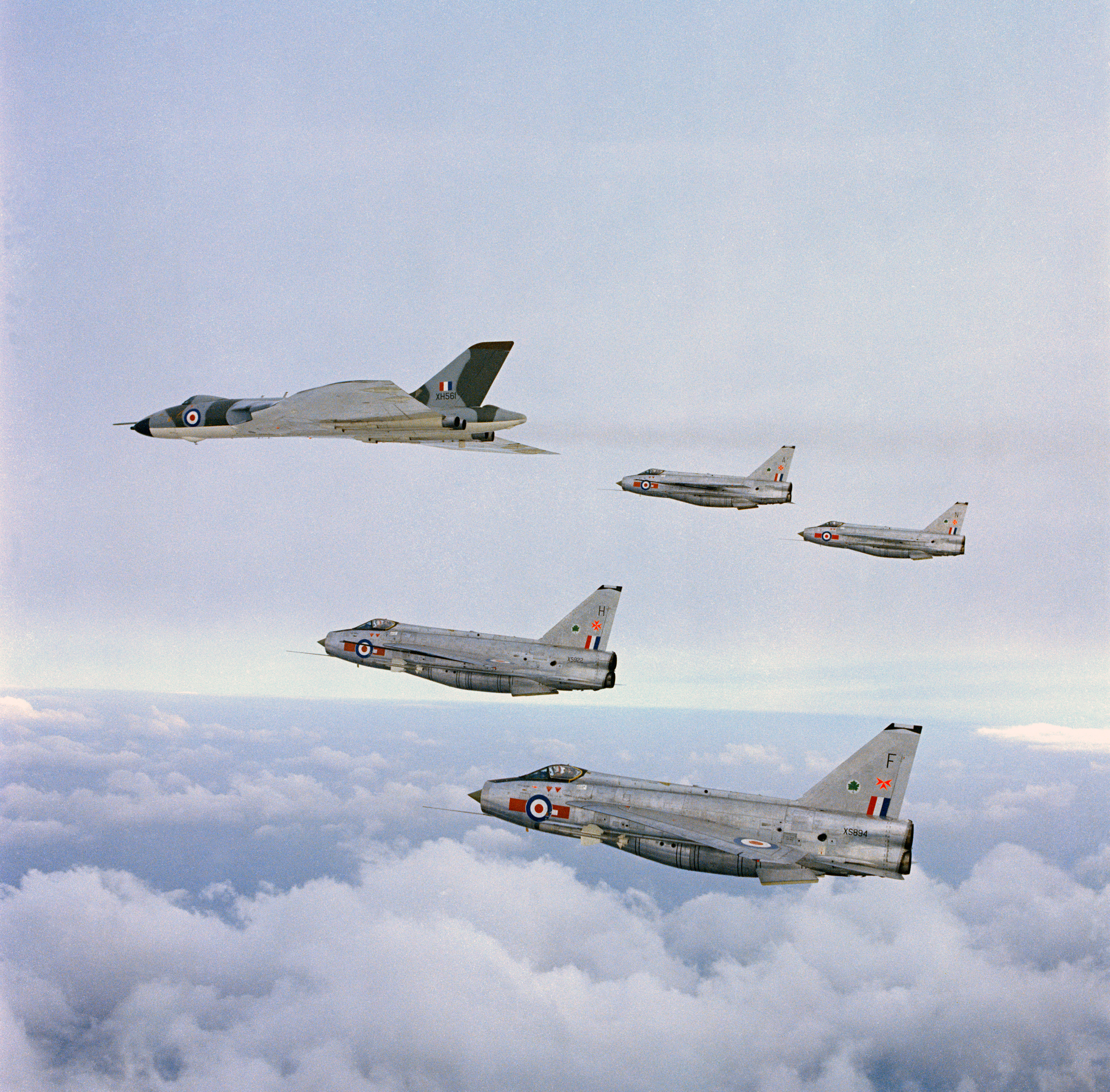
Four No. 5 (Fighter) Squadron Lightning F.6s in formation with an Avro Vulcan B.2, April 1968. (Note the Maltese cross zaps on the tails from an APC deployment to RAF Luqa in October 1967).

The squadron reformed at RAF Binbrook, Lincolnshire, on 8 October 1965 with the English Electric Lightning interceptor. However, upon reformation the unit did not initially operate a Lightning, with the squadron first flying Hawker Hunter T.7A WV318 fitted with Lightning instruments. The squadron's first Lightning (a twin seat T.5) was delivered to RAF Binbrook on 19 November. The squadron's first single seat Lightnings arrived on 10 December 1965, when two Lightning F.3 were delivered. The first production Lightning F.6 was received on 3 January 1967. Between 6 and 25 October 1967, the squadron deployed to RAF Luqa, Malta, with nine Lightning F.6 and a single Lighting T.5 for an Air Defence Exercise against Avro Vulcan B.2 of No. 50 Squadron. The squadron deployed to RAF Luqa once again between 1 and 8 August 1968 for Exercise Nimble.

Over Christmas 1969, No. 5 Squadron deployed on reinforcement Exercise Ultimacy to RAF Tengah, Singapore using in flight refuelling and stopping only once en route at RAF Masirah in Oman. Long-distance route proving with the new over-wing tanks had taken place previously in 1968 with a limited non stop deployment to RAF Muharraq in Bahrain.

In 1970, the squadron received a pair of Lightning F.1A, which were used as targets for the Lightning F.6 due to them being lighter and more nimble (these were later replaced with the Lightning F.3). On 8 September 1970, the squadron lost Lightning F.6 XS894 when it crashed near Flamborough Head, Yorkshire, killing the pilot William Schaffner, a Captain in the US Air Force. The squadron deployed a pair of Lighting F.3, seven Lightning F.6 and a single two-seat T.5 to RAF Luqa between 18 November and 13 December 1974, to take part in Exercise Sunfinder, alongside Avro Shackleton AEW.2 of No. 8 Squadron and English Electric Canberra B.2 of No. 85 Squadron. Between 5 April and 7 May 1976, the squadron deployed to RAF Luqa with ten Lightning F.6 for an Armament Practice Camp (APC). No. 5 Squadron's last APC deployment to Luqa was between 31 March and 5 May 1977.

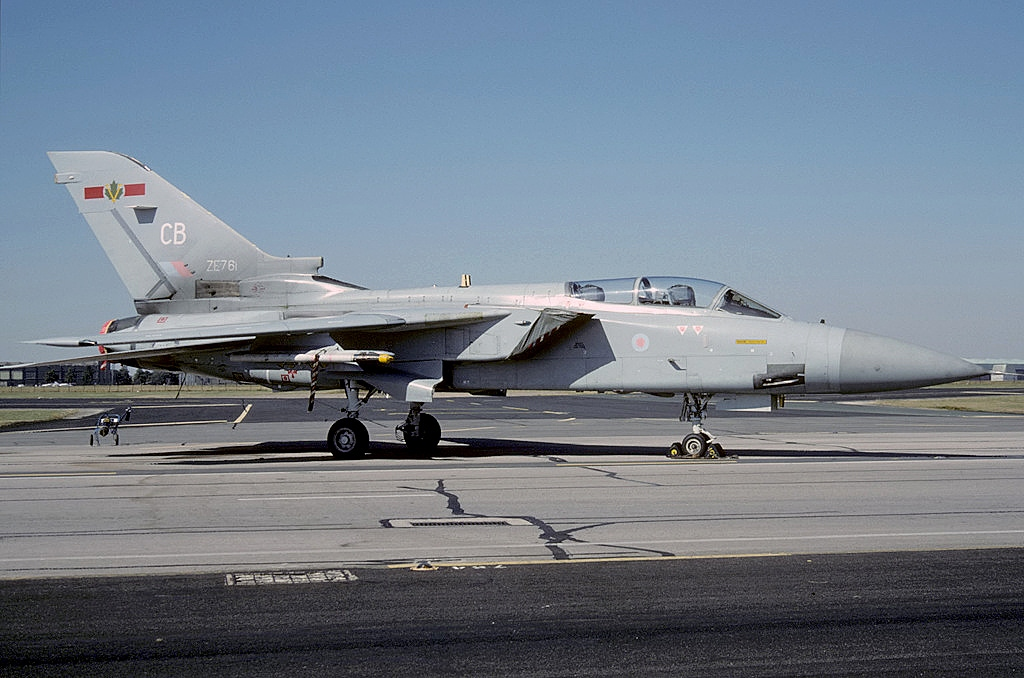
A Panavia Tornado F3 in No. 5 Squadron markings during 1991

In November 1987, the squadron put up a nine-ship of Lightning F.6 to mark the type's impending withdrawal after 22 years of service. The last Lightnings were withdrawn by December 1987, with the squadron relocating to RAF Coningsby in preparation for converting to the Panavia Tornado F3,with the squadron received its first aircraft in January 1988.

In August 1990, No. 5 Squadron was the first RAF squadron (accompanied by No. 29 (F) Squadron) to be deployed as part the UK's contribution to the Gulf War, with the first six Tornado F3 arriving on 11 August at Dhahran Airfield, Saudi Arabia. Between 1993 and 1995, the squadron participated Operation Deny Flight, enforcing the no-fly zone over Bosnia and Herzegovina. The squadron disbanded on 30 September 2002, with personnel being reassigned to other units.

=== Sentinel R1 (2004–2021) ===
The squadron reformed on 1 April 2004 as No. 5 (Army Co-operation) Squadron at RAF Waddington to operate the Raytheon Sentinel R1, which made its maiden flight on 26 May 2004. The radar-equipped aircraft provided battlefield and ground surveillance for the British Army in a similar role to the American Northrop Grumman E-8 Joint STARS aircraft. The Sentinel officially entered service with the No. 5 (AC) Squadron on 1 December 2008. The fifth and last aircraft was delivered to the squadron in February 2009. Full operating capability was achieved at the end of 2010. In 2011, Sentinels from the squadron participated in Operation Ellamy over Libya, which were later described as pivotal by RAF Air Chief Marshal Sir Stephen Dalton.

Between 2009 and 2011, No. 5 Squadron also briefly operated four Hawker Beechcraft Shadow R1, an intelligence gathering aircraft based on the Beechcraft King Air 350. The first Shadow R1 was delivered to the squadron in May 2009. These were transferred over to the newly reformed No. 14 Squadron in October 2011.

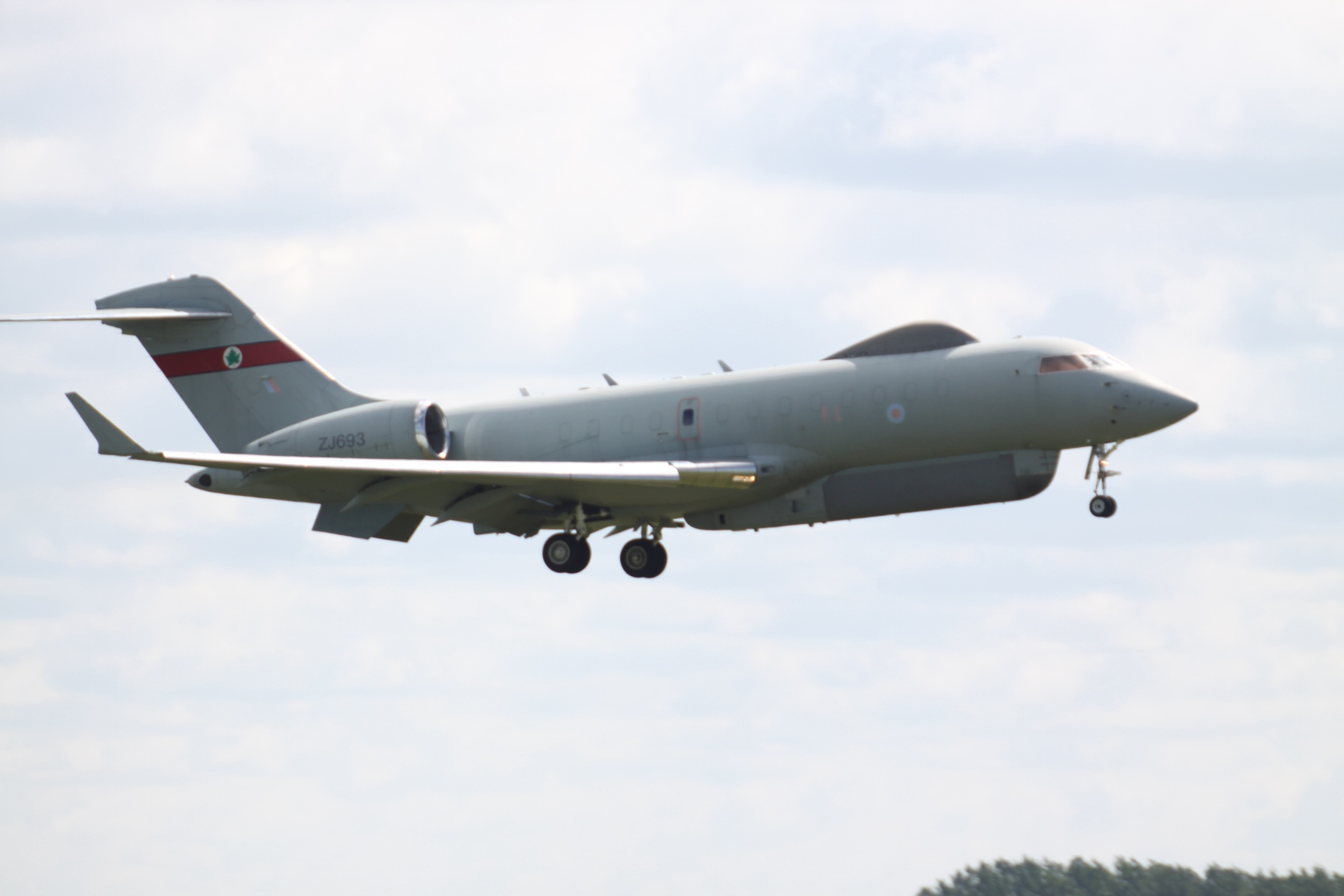
A Raytheon Sentinel R1 operated by No. 5 Squadron, seen during 2012

On 25 January 2013, a Sentinel R1 deployed to Dakar-Ouakam Air Base, Senegal, to assist with France's Operation Serval in Mali. Over the course of a four-month long detachment, Sentinels flew a total of 697 hours across 66 sorties. On 18 May 2014, the squadron deployed a Sentinel to Kotoka International Airport, Ghana, in order to assist with searching for 223 schoolgirls who had been kidnapped by Boko Haram in Nigeria. In September 2014, the squadron temporarily relocated to RAF Cranwell along with No. 14 Squadron due to the resurfacing of RAF Waddington's runway which took over a year to complete. The squadron sent a single Sentinel R1 to Exercise Red Flag 15–1 at Nellis AFB, Nevada, between 26 January and 13 February 2015. On 26 March 2015, two Sentinel R1 were deployed to RAF Akrotiri, Cyprus, in support of Operation Shader, the British military intervention in Iraq and Syria.

In July 2017, one Sentinel R1 was withdrawn from use, whilst the remaining four continued operating until their out-of-service date of March 2021. On 25 February 2021, ZJ694 carried out No. 5 Squadron's last Sentinel operational sortie. Across the Sentinel's 14 years of service, the squadron flew 32,000 hours across 4,870 sorties. The squadron was subsequently disbanded on 31 March 2021, with the Sentinel's role being provided other aircraft, such as the Poseidon MRA1 and Protector RG1.

== Aircraft operated ==
Aircraft operated by No. 5 Squadron include:

- Avro Type E (July 1913 – July 1914)
- Farman MF.7 Longhorn (July 1913 – July 1914)
- Farman HF.20 (July 1913 – July 1914)
- Farman MF.7 Longhorn (July 1913 – March 1915)
- Royal Aircraft Factory S.E.2a (January 1914 – March 1914)
- Sopwith Three-seater (February 1914 – August 1914)
- Royal Aircraft Factory B.E.1 (1914 – August 1914)
- Sopwith Tabloid (June 1914–Aug 1914)
- Avro 504 (July 1914 – August 1915)
- Royal Aircraft Factory B.E.8 (August 1914 – September 1914)
- Farman HF.27 (September 1914 – September 1914)
- Bristol Scout (September 1914 – October 1914; 1915 – March 1915)
- Martinsyde S.1 (January 1915 – August 1915)
- Voisin LA (February 1915 – March 1915)
- Blériot Parasol (March 1915 – May 1915)
- Vickers F.B.5 (March 1915 – January 1916)
- Caudron G.3 (April 1915 – May 1915)
- Airco DH.2 (July 1915 – August 1915; January 1916 – May 1916)
- Royal Aircraft Factory B.E.2c (August 1915 – April 1917)
- Royal Aircraft Factory F.E.8 (December 1915 – May 1916)
- Royal Aircraft Factory B.E.2d (June 1916 – June 1917)
- Royal Aircraft Factory B.E.2e (January 1917 – June 1917)
- Royal Aircraft Factory B.E.2f (January 1917 – June 1917)
- Royal Aircraft Factory B.E.2g (January 1917 – June 1917)
- Royal Aircraft Factory R.E.8 (May 1917 – March 1918)
- Bristol F.2B (March 1919 – September 1919; April 1920 – May 1931)
- Westland Wapiti Mk.IIa (May 1931 – June 1940)
- Hawker Hart (June 1940 – February 1941)
- Hawker Audax (February 1941 – September 1942)
- Curtiss Mohawk Mk.IV (December 1941 – June 1943)
- Hawker Hurricane Mk.IIc (June 1943 – September 1944)
- Hawker Hurricane Mk.IId (June 1943 – September 1944)
- Republic Thunderbolt Mk.I (September 1944 – February 1946)
- Republic Thunderbolt Mk.II (September 1944 – February 1946)
- Hawker Tempest F.2 (March 1946 – August 1947)
- Supermarine Spitfire LF.16e (February 1949 – February 1951)
- Miles Martinet TT.1 (February 1949 – February 1951)
- Airspeed Oxford T.1 (February 1949 – February 1951)
- Bristol Beaufighter TT.10 (February 1949 – February 1951)
- de Havilland Vampire F.3 (August 1950 – September 1951)
- de Havilland Vampire FB.5 (March 1952 – December 1952)
- de Havilland Venom FB.1 (December 1952 – July 1955)
- de Havilland Venom FB.4 (July 1955 – October 1957)
- Gloster Meteor NF.11 (January 1959 – August 1960)
- Gloster Javelin FAW.5 (January 1960 – November 1962)
- Gloster Javelin FAW.9 (November 1962 – October 1965)
- Hawker Hunter T.7A (October 1965 – 196?)
- English Electric Lightning T.5 (November 1965 – 1987)
- English Electric Lightning F.3 (December 1965 – January 1967; October 1972 – September 1987)
- English Electric Lightning F.6 (December 1966 – December 1987)
- English Electric Lightning F.1A (June 1970 – September 1972)
- Panavia Tornado F3 (January 1988 – September 2002)
- Raytheon Sentinel R1 (2006 – March 2021)
- Hawker Beechcraft Shadow R1 (May 2009 – October 2011)

== Heritage ==
=== Badge and motto ===
The squadron's badge features the maple leaf, the national symbol of Canada. It commemorates the squadron's close links with the Canadian Corps during the First World War and was approved by King George VI in June 1937. An earlier unauthorised version included Roman numeral 'V' in the centre of the leaf.

The squadron's motto is Frangas non flectas (Latin for 'Thou mayst break, but shall not bend me').

== Battle honours ==
No. 5 Squadron has received the following battle honours. Those marked with an asterisk (*) may be emblazoned on the squadron standard.

- Western Front (1914–1918)
- Mons (1914)*
- Neuve Chappelle (1915)
- Ypres (1917)*
- Loos (1915)*
- Arras (1917)*
- Somme (1918)*
- Amiens (1918)*
- Hindenburg Line (1918)
- Waziristan (1920–1925)
- Mohmand (1927)
- North West Frontier (1930–1931)
- North West Frontier (1935–1939)
- Arakan (1942–1944)*
- Manipur (1944)
- Burma (1944–1945)*
- Afghanistan (2001-14)
- Libya (2011)

== See also ==
- List of Royal Air Force aircraft squadrons
