= RAF Coltishall =

Former RAF station in Norfolk, England

RAF Coltishall
- Coltishall, Norfolk in England
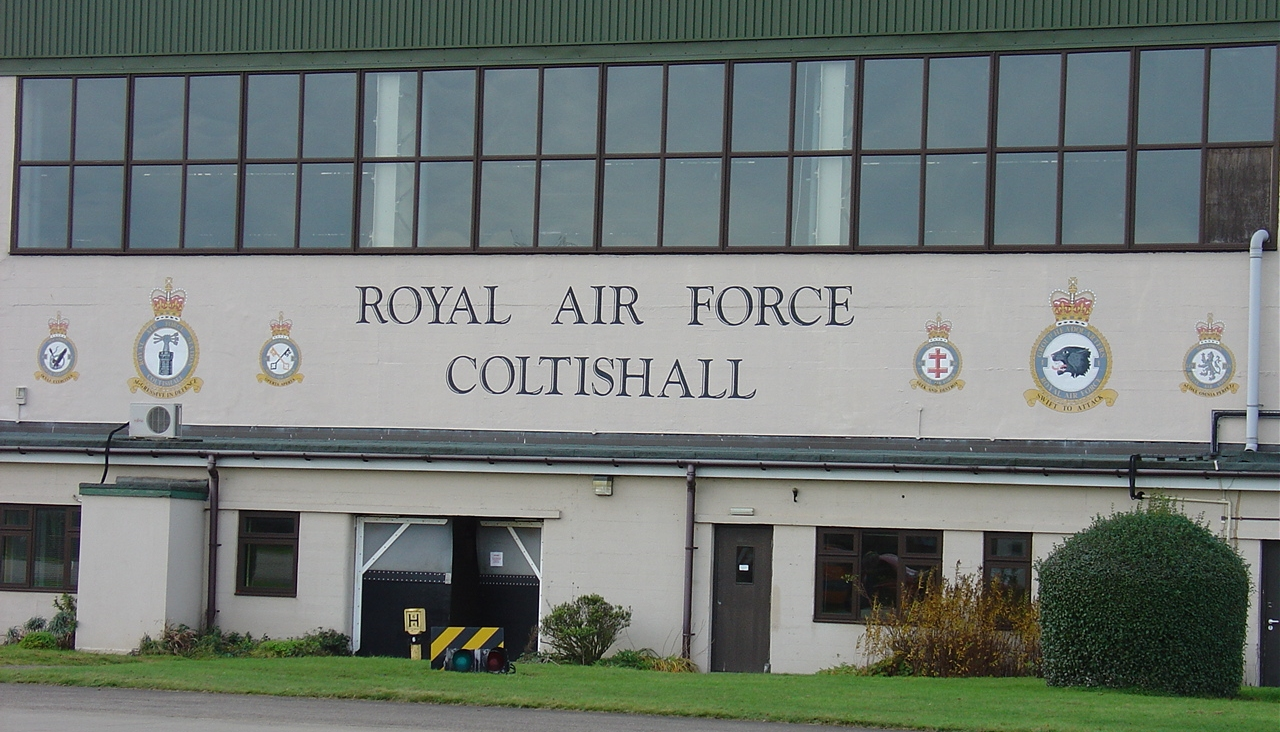
- Image of the various badges painted on the central aircraft hangar. These depict the final full capacity status of RAF Coltishall. From left to right: No.6 Sqn, RAF Coltishall station badge, No.16 Sqn – No.41 Sqn, No.1 Group Headquarters RAF, No.54 Sqn.

- Aggressive in Defence

Site information
- Type: Royal Air Force station
- Code: CS
- Owner: Ministry of Defence
- Operator: Royal Air Force
- Controlled by: RAF Fighter Command 1940- * No. 12 Group RAF; RAF Strike Command
- Condition: closed

Location
- Location within Norfolk RAF Coltishall (the United Kingdom)
- Coordinates: 52°45′17″N 001°21′26″E
- Grid reference: TG270225

Site history
- Built: February 1939–1940
- In use: 29 May 1940 – 30 November 2006
- Fate: Site sold for civilian uses including HM Prison Bure, a solar farm and Scottow Enterprise Park
- Battles/wars: European theatre of World War II; Cold War

Airfield information
- Identifiers: IATA: CLF, ICAO: EGYC, WMO: 03495
- Elevation: 17 metres (56 ft) AMSL
Runways
| Direction | Length and surface |
|---|---|
| 04/22 | 2,286 metres (7,500 ft) grooved asphalt |
- Data relevant to operational period

UK Conservation Area
- Official name: RAF Coltishall
- Designated: September 2010

Scheduled monument
- Official name: World War II fighter pen, Cold War blast walls and associated remains
- Designated: 7 March 2008
- Reference no.: 1021425

Listed Building – Grade II
- Official name: Officer's Mess, Former RAF Coltishall, Norfolk
- Designated: 16 October 2017
- Reference no.: 1424475

Royal Air Force Coltishall more commonly known as RAF Coltishall (IATA: CLF, ICAO: EGYC) is a former Royal Air Force station located 10 miles (16 kilometres) north-north-east of Norwich, in the English county of Norfolk, East Anglia, which operated from 1939 to 2006.

It was a fighter airfield in the Second World War and afterwards, a station for night fighters, then ground attack aircraft until closure.

After longstanding speculation, the future of the station was sealed once the Ministry of Defence announced that the Eurofighter Typhoon, a rolling replacement aircraft, displacing the ageing SEPECAT Jaguar, would not be located there. The last of the Jaguar squadrons left on 1 April 2006, and the station finally closed, one month early and £10 million under budget, on 30 November 2006; 19 years ago.

The station motto was Aggressive in Defence. The station badge was a stone tower surmounted by a mailed fist grasping three bind-bolts (blunt arrows), which symbolised a position of strength in defence of the homeland, indicative of the aggressive spirit which Coltishall fighter aircraft were prepared to shoot down the enemy.

== History ==
=== Second World War ===
Work on RAF Coltishall was started in February 1939; 87 years ago. The airfield, then known as Scottow Aerodrome, was initially built as a bomber station, on land near Scottow Hall. Following the established tradition, the station would have been named after the nearest railway station, which would have made it RAF Buxton, but to avoid possible confusion with the town of Buxton in Derbyshire, it was named after the local village of Coltishall instead. The airfield was completed and entered service in May 1940; 86 years ago as a fighter base. The first aircraft movement at Coltishall was a Bristol Blenheim IV L7835 flown by Sergeant RG Bales and Sergeant Barnes.

During the Second World War, Coltishall operated the Hawker Hurricane. A notable Coltishall fighter pilot was Douglas Bader, appointed as leader of No. 242 Squadron, a mainly Canadian Hurricane squadron. They had suffered significant losses in the recent Battle of France, and he was credited with restoring their morale.

Coltishall later became home to night fighters. At the same time, the Royal Navy Fleet Air Arm operated aircraft from RAF Coltishall over the North Sea. From 10 February to 7 April 1945, it was the airfield for No. 124 Squadron, at that time a fighter-bomber squadron flying Supermarine Spitfire IX.HF's, whilst the squadron was bombing V-2 launch sites in the Netherlands. At the end of the war, Coltishall was briefly given over to Polish squadrons until they returned home.

=== Cold War ===
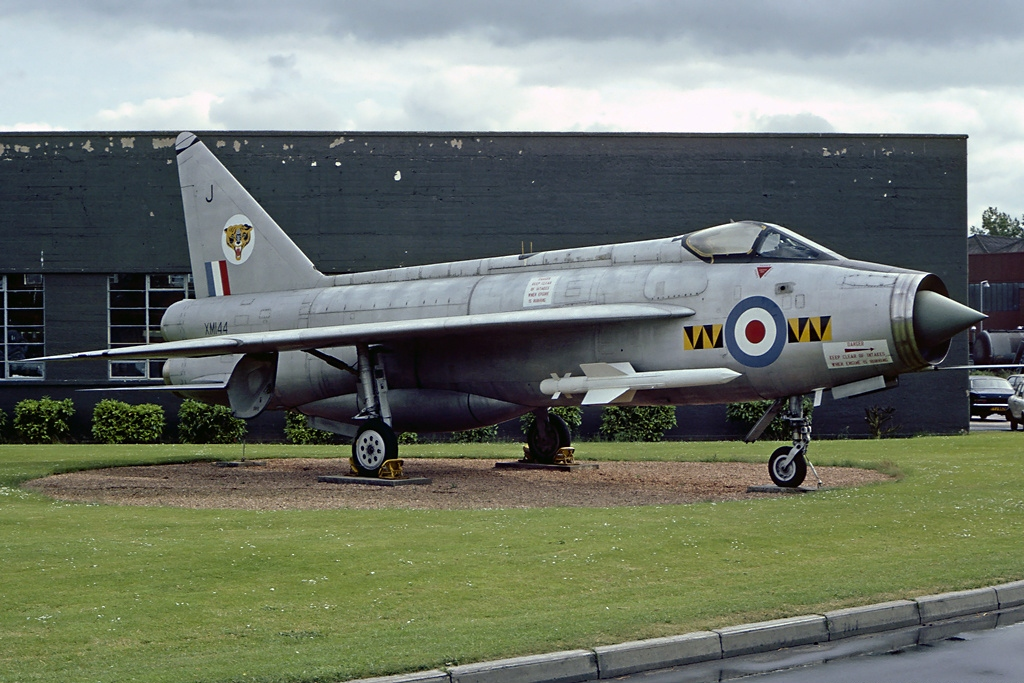
English Electric Lightning F.1 XM144 of No. 74 (Fighter) Squadron, the Lightning entered service with the squadron at Coltishall in June 1960.

In the 1950s, RAF Coltishall was a designated a 'V-bomber dispersal airfield', which V bombers tasked with delivery of the British nuclear deterrent; the Avro Vulcan, Handley Page Victor, and Vickers Valiant, could use in the event of their home station being damaged by enemy action.

Postwar, the station was home to a variety of units and aircraft, including de Havilland Mosquitos, Gloster Javelins and, from 1963, the Historic Aircraft Flight (now known as the Battle of Britain Memorial Flight or BBMF). RAF Coltishall became home to the RAF's first English Electric Lightning F.1s when No. 74 (Fighter) Squadron began to receive the jet in June 1960, after arriving the year before. No. 74 (F) Squadron relocated to RAF Leuchars in Scotland on 2 March 1964. No. 226 Operational Conversion Unit (OCU) arrived at the base on 12 April 1964, tasked with training new pilots how to fly the Lightning. The last Lightnings left Coltishall in September 1974 when No. 266 OCU departed.

The Lightnings were replaced by the Anglo-French SEPECAT Jaguar GR.1, with the first Jaguar unit, No. 54 (F) Squadron, arriving at Coltishall on 8 August 1974. They were soon joined by No. 6 Squadron who arrived at the base in November 1974, making the station exclusively home to the Jaguar in terms of fixed wing aircraft.

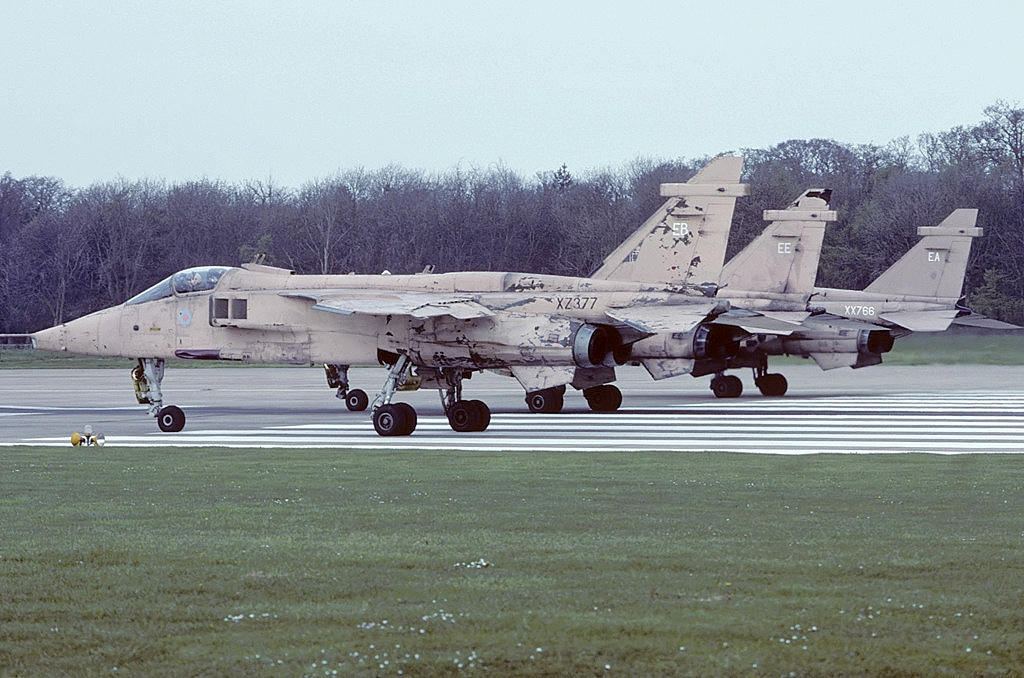
Trio of No. 6 Squadron SEPECAT Jaguar GR.1As at Coltishall in Op GRANBY livery, April 1991.

No. 41 (Designate) Squadron formed at RAF Coltishall on 1 October 1976, and worked up as a Jaguar unit until officially standing up on 1 April 1977, when the No. 41 Squadron operating the McDonnell Douglas Phantom FGR.2 at RAF Coningsby disbanded the previous day.

In 1991, elements of all three based Jaguar units; Nos. 6, 41 and 54 Squadrons, along with associated support personnel deployed to Muharraq Airfield, Bahrain, in preparation for Operation Granby due to Saddam Hussein's invasion of Kuwait.

Coltishall played host to several United States Air Force Coronet deployments during the Cold War:

- Coronet Heron – 12 to 23 June 1978 saw the deployment of 12 McDonnell Douglas RF-4C Phantom IIs from the 62nd Tactical Reconnaissance Squadron.
- Coronet Joust – 23 June to 7 July 1983 saw the deployment of 12 RF-4C Phantom IIs from the 106th Tactical Reconnaissance Squadron (Alabama Air National Guard).
- Coronet Mobile – 13 to 26 September 1986 saw the deployment of 11 RF-4C Phantom IIs from the 106th Tactical Reconnaissance Squadron (Alabama Air National Guard).

=== 1991 to closure ===
The Jaguars deployed again, this time to Incirlik Air Base, Turkey, to participate in Operation Warden which set up a no-fly zone over Iraq. Between 1993 and 1995, the Jaguars deployed to Gioia del Colle Air Base, Italy, as part of Operation Deny Flight to enforce a no-fly zone over the Balkans. In 1997, No. 54 Squadron deployed to Italy once more in support of Operation Deliberate Guard. No. 6 Squadron deployed once again to Incirlik in 1998 as part of Operation Resinate.

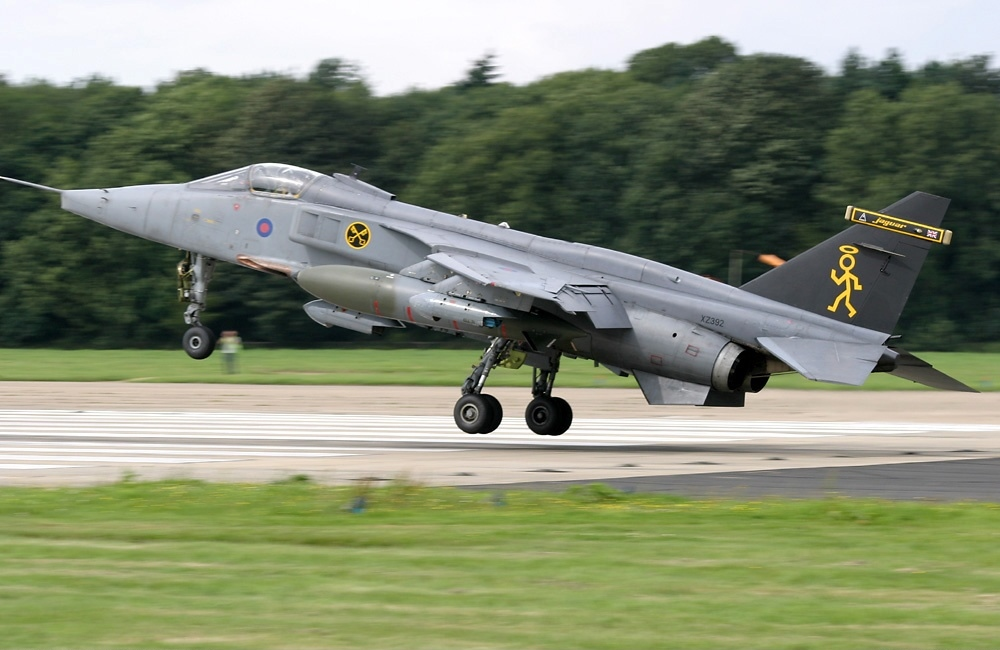
SEPECAT Jaguar GR.3A XZ392 of No. 16 (Reserve) Squadron landing at RAF Coltishall, August 2004.

On 21 July 2000, No. 16 (Reserve) Squadron, the Jaguar OCU, arrived at RAF Coltishall from RAF Lossiemouth, Scotland. In December 2000, five Jaguars from No. 41 (F) Squadron deployed to Luleå Airport, Sweden, to train alongside Saab 37 Viggens of the Norrbotten Wing.

Coltishall was also home to the yellow search and rescue (SAR) helicopters of No. 202 Squadron tasked with conducting air-sea rescue operations (Westland Sea King), and latterly No. 22 Squadron (Westland Wessex), but under subsequent reorganisation, the SAR operations were moved to RAF Wattisham, in Suffolk where they remained until 15 July 2015, following the privatisation (and thus disbandment) of the entire UK military search and rescue operations.

Coltishall eventually became the last surviving operational RAF fighter airfield involved in the Battle of Britain (other than RAF Northolt), and a visible remnant in the form of a Second World War revetment still stands adjacent to the north-west taxiway and, together with one of the two sets of 1950s Cold War blast walls, is now a scheduled monument.

With the anticipated arrival of the Eurofighter Typhoon in the RAF, the gradual retirement of the Jaguar force began. Coltishall was not chosen as a future Typhoon airfield for a number of reasons, and so, with no future RAF role for Coltishall, the station was earmarked for closure.

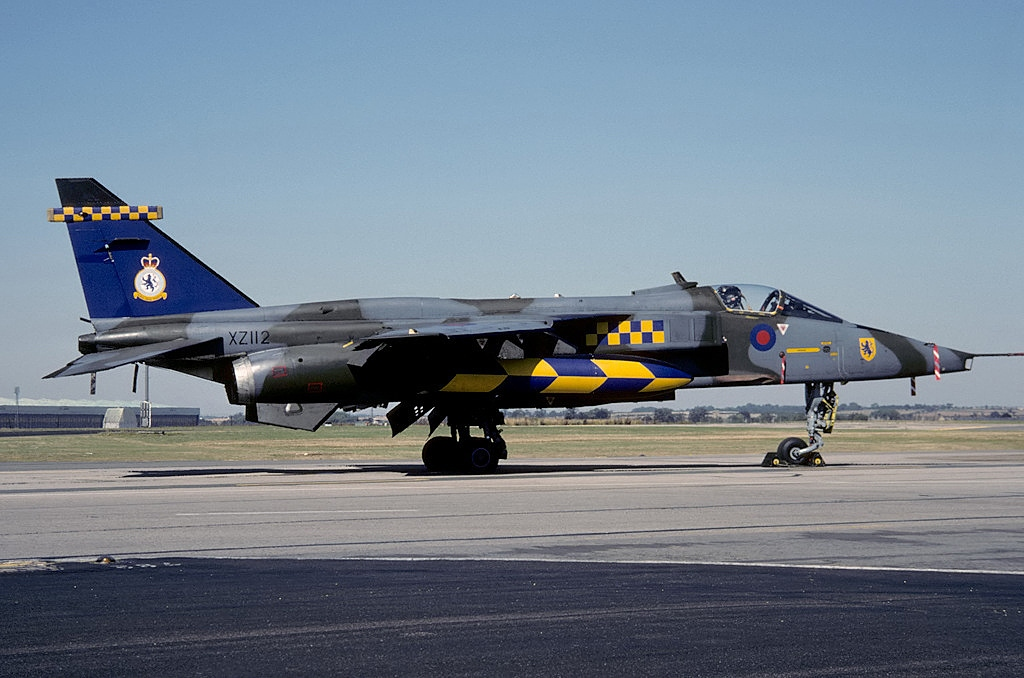
SEPECAT Jaguar GR.1A XZ112 of No. 54 (Fighter) Squadron at RAF Brize Norton in 1991. This Jaguar was the last to leave RAF Coltishall on 3 April 2006.

The UK's Ministry of Defence, in the 'Delivering Security in a Changing World' review, announced that the station would close by December 2006. The first two Jaguar squadrons to disband, No. 16 (R) Squadron and No. 54 (F) Squadron, did so on 11 March 2005. The final Jaguar squadrons departed on 1 April 2006, when No. 6 Squadron transferred to RAF Coningsby, however, this was subsequently disbanded on 31 May 2007 (to await delivery of the Eurofighter Typhoon at RAF Leuchars), and No. 41 (F) Squadron transferred to RAF Coningsby in OCU role. The final front line RAF movement from the station was by Jaguar XZ112, piloted by Jim Luke, on 3 April 2006.

Of the final gate guardians, the replica Hawker Hurricane (dedicated to Douglas Bader) was transferred to RAF High Wycombe, and the Jaguar was formally named the Spirit of Coltishall, and was subsequently transferred to the grounds of Norfolk County Council where she is dedicated to the memory of all those who served at Coltishall. RAF Coltishall is commemorated at the RAF Air Defence Radar Museum at Neatishead (which Coltishall formerly parented).

Some limited flying from light aircraft, including those of the Coltishall Flying Club, did continue after the end of RAF flying operations, until October 2006. While 1 April 2006 saw the disbandment parade for the station, it did not actually disband and finally close until 30 November 2006. Associated facilities such as the Douglas Bader Primary School for military dependents were also closed. On the final day of the station, the gates were opened to the public; anybody with photographic ID was welcomed onto the station to have a look around and view the final closing ceremony and parade, which saw a flypast by four RAF Jaguars, and a solitary Hawker Hurricane from the Imperial War Museum Duxford.

On 30 November 2006, RAF Coltishall was officially handed over to Defence Estates (the then MoD agency responsible for all UK Military sites) who were to handle the disposal of the site; it was then formally known as MoD Coltishall until its ultimate disposal.

The site was sold to Norfolk County Council for £4 million.

== Station commanders ==
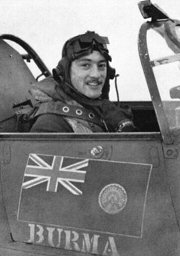
Robert 'Bob' Stanford Tuck c.1941, later to become Commanding Officer of RAF Coltishall

Note: The ranks shown are the ranks held at the time of holding the appointment of commanding officer, Royal Air Force Coltishall.

RAF Coltishall station commanders
| date from | date to | rank | name |
|---|---|---|---|
| 15 May 1940 | 9 January 1941 | Wing Commander | W K Beisiegal |
| 9 January 1941 | 11 September 1942 | Group Captain | Ronald Lees |
| 11 September 1942 | 20 April 1943 | Group Captain | George D Harvey |
| 20 April 1943 | 10 December 1943 | Group Captain | Arthur V Harvey |
| 10 December 1943 | 25 May 1945 | Group Captain | A H Donaldson |
| 25 May 1945 | 9 August 1945 | Group Captain | A H Dunn |
| 9 August 1945 | 27 February 1946 | Group Captain | T H Rolski |
| 27 February 1946 | 13 February 1947 | Group Captain | Aleksander Gabszewicz |
| 13 February 1947 | 22 January 1948 | Wing Commander | Robert Stanford Tuck |
| 22 January 1948 | 6 March 1950 | Wing Commander | Denis Spotswood |
| 6 March 1950 | 1 February 1951 | Wing Commander | E L Colbeck-Welch |
| 1 February 1951 | 8 May 1953 | Group Captain | A H Smythe |
| 8 May 1953 | 12 December 1955 | Group Captain | P P Hanks |
| 12 December 1955 | 25 November 1958 | Group Captain | John Clayton Sisson CBE DFC |
| 25 November 1958 | 1 June 1959 | Wing Commander | W Laing |
| 1 June 1959 | 15 November 1961 | Group Captain | Harold A C Bird-Wilson |
| 15 November 1961 | 1 November 1963 | Group Captain | L H Malins |
| 1 December 1963 | 3 June 1966 | Group Captain | R L Topp |
| 4 June 1966 | 3 January 1969 | Group Captain | M E Hobson |
| 3 January 1969 | 20 November 1969 | Group Captain | W J Stacey |
| 20 November 1969 | 18 November 1971 | Group Captain | J T Jennings |
| 18 November 1971 | 28 December 1973 | Group Captain | J A Gilbert |
| 28 December 1973 | 6 August 1976 | Group Captain | L Swart |
| 6 August 1976 | 6 September 1978 | Group Captain | J H Honey |
| 6 September 1978 | 15 October 1980 | Group Captain | T H Stonor |
| 15 October 1980 | 3 December 1982 | Group Captain | T J Nash |
| 3 December 1982 | 8 February 1985 | Group Captain | G R Profit |
| 8 February 1985 | 4 June 1987 | Group Captain | M R French |
| 4 June 1987 | 2 August 1989 | Group Captain | F J Hoare |
| 3 August 1989 | 16 August 1991 | Group Captain | M J Abbott |
| 16 August 1991 | 5 July 1993 | Group Captain | J P Dacre |
| 5 July 1993 | 28 July 1995 | Group Captain | N C Rusling |
| 28 July 1999 | 5 September 1997 | Group Captain | T C Hewlett |
| 5 September 1997 | 5 September 1999 | Group Captain | Stephen G G Dalton |
| 6 September 1999 | 5 October 2001 | Group Captain | Chris N Harper |
| 6 October 2001 | 28 November 2003 | Group Captain | R D Cobelli |
| 28 November 2003 | 2006 | Group Captain | Graham A Wright, OBE |
| 2006 | 13 October 2006 | Wing Commander | Paul Robins |
| 13 October 2006 | 30 November 2006 | Squadron Leader | Jason Hughes |

== Coltishall squadrons ==
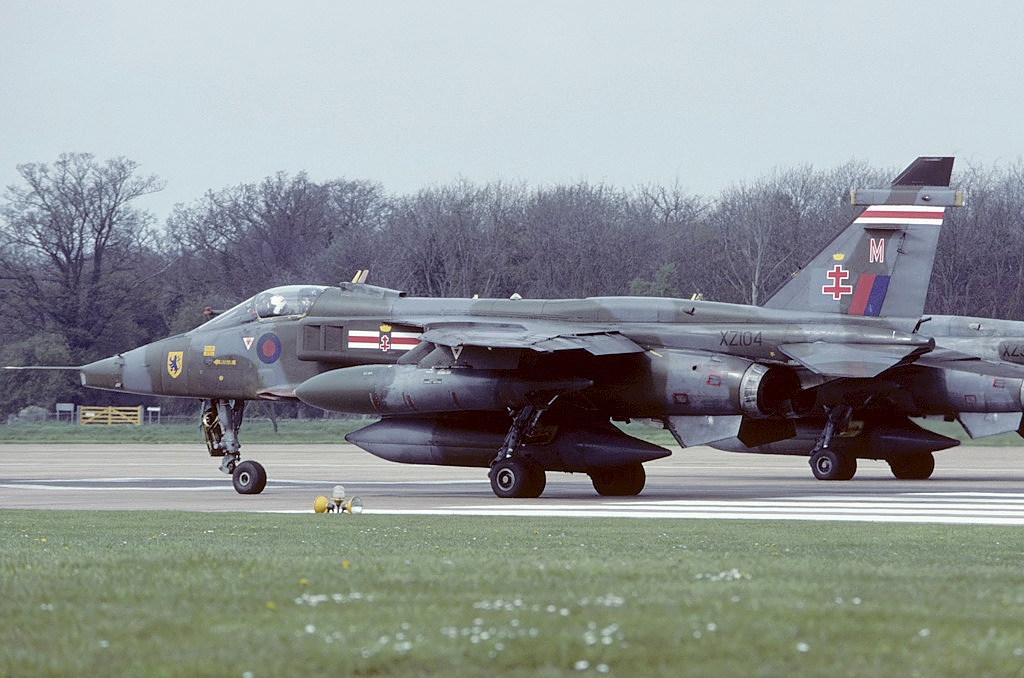
A SEPECAT Jaguar GR1A of No. 41 Squadron in its original green-grey camouflage livery at RAF Coltishall

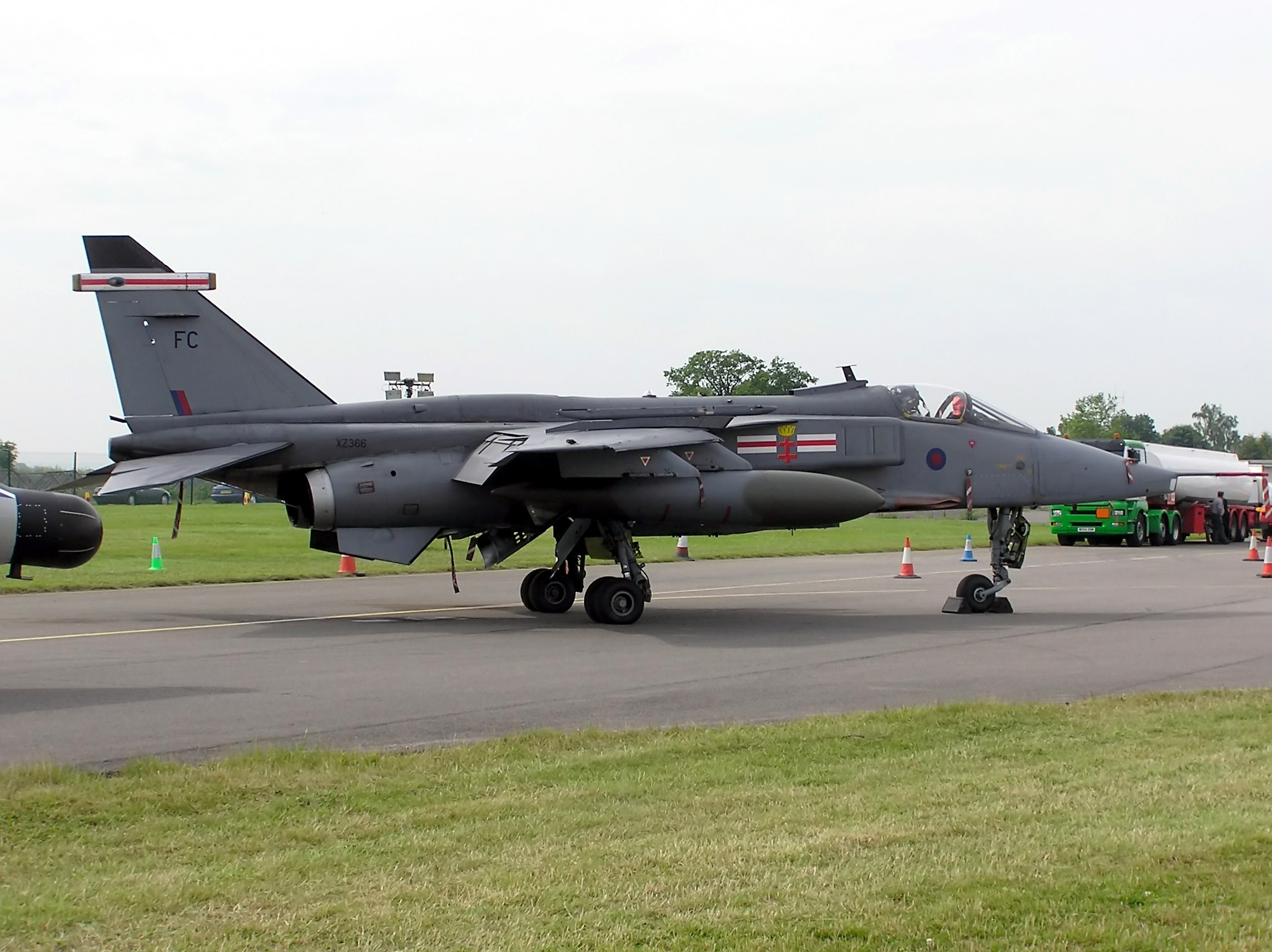
Jaguar GR3A of 41 Squadron in the subsequent low-visibility grey scheme, in 2005 at Kemble Airfield, Gloucestershire

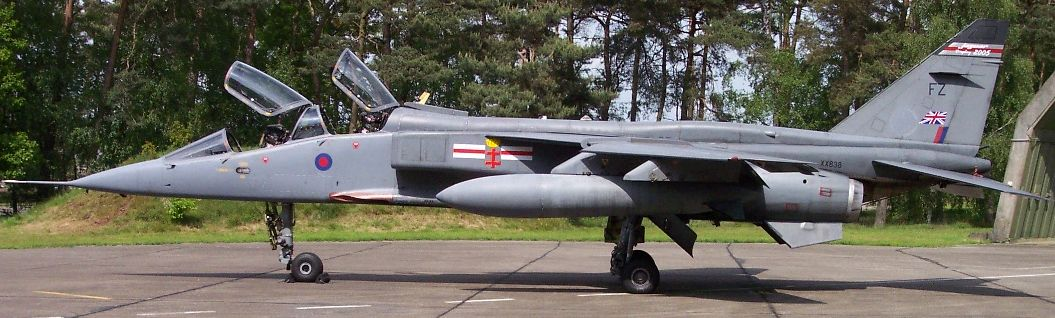
A 41 Sqn Jaguar T4A 2-seat trainer on detachment to RAF Germany

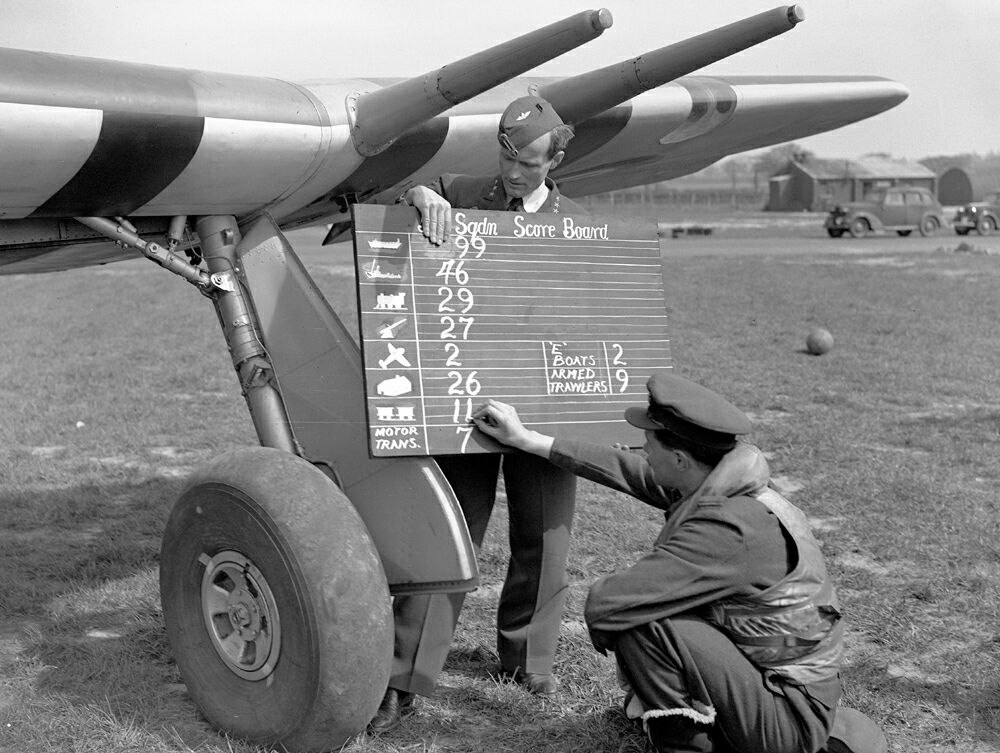
56 Sqn 'scoreboard'

- No. 1 Squadron RAF; Spitfire LFIXb, F21
- No. 6 Squadron RAF; Jaguar GR1/1A/1B, T2/T2A, GR3/3A, T4/T4A (November 1974 – April 2006)
- No. 16 Squadron RAF (? – March 2005) (Squadron Standard now laid up in Notre-Dame Cathedral Saint-Omer, France)
- No. 22 Squadron RAF; Beaufort I, II, Whirlwind HAR2, HAR10, Wessex HAR2
- No. 23 Squadron RAF; Mosquito NF36, Vampire NF10, Venom NF2, NF3, Javelin FAW4, FAW7, FAW9R
- No. 25 Squadron RAF; Mosquito VI, XVII, NFXXX
- No. 26 Squadron RAF
- No. 29 Squadron RAF; Beaufighter IF, VIF
- No. 41 Squadron RAF; Javelin FAW4, Jaguar GR1/1A/1B, T2/T2A, GR3/3A, T4/T4A (1976 – April 2006)
- No. 42 Squadron RAF; Beaufort I, II
- No. 54 Squadron RAF; Jaguar GR1/1A/1B, T2/T2A, GR3/3A, T4/T4A (August 1974 – March 2005) (Squadron Standard now laid up in Norwich Cathedral)
- No. 64 Squadron RAF; Spitfire I, Vb, LEVc
- No. 66 Squadron RAF; Spitfire I
- No. 68 Squadron RAF; Beaufighter IF, VI, Mosquito XVII, XIX, XXX
- No. 72 Squadron RAF; Spitfire I
- No. 74 Squadron RAF 'Tigers'; Spitfire IIa, Hunter F6, Lightning F1, F3 (1940, 1960–1966)
- No. 80 Squadron RAF; Tempest V
- No. 93 Squadron RAF; Havoc I
- No. 109 Squadron RAF
- No. 118 Squadron RAF; Spitfire Vb
- No. 124 Squadron RAF; Spitfire XI
- No. 125 Squadron RAF; Mosquito XIV, XXX
- No. 133 Squadron RAF; one of the American-piloted Eagle Squadrons formed 1941, Hurricane IIb
- No. 137 Squadron RAF; Whirlwind I
- No. 141 Squadron RAF; Mosquito NF36, Meteor NF11, Venom NF3, Javelin FAW4
- No. 151 Squadron RAF; Hurricane I, IIb, IIc, Defiant I
- No. 152 Squadron RAF; Spitfire IIa
- No. 154 Squadron RAF; Spitfire Va, Vb
- No. 195 Squadron RAF; Typhoon Ib
- No. 202 Squadron RAF; Whirlwind HAR10, Sea King HAR3
- No. 222 Squadron RAF; Spitfire Ia, IIa, IIb
- No. 226 Squadron RAF OCU; Lightning F1, F1A, F3, T4, T5, T55
- No. 228 Squadron RAF; Whirlwind HAR10
- No. 228 Squadron RAF OCU; Mosquito (various), Meteor (various)
- No. 229 Squadron RAF; Spitfire XI, XVI
- No. 234 Squadron RAF; Spitfire Vb, Vc
- No. 242 Squadron RAF; Hurricane I
- No. 255 Squadron RAF; Beaufighter IIF
- No. 257 Squadron RAF; Hurricane I, IIa, IIb, IIc
- No. 264 Squadron RAF; Mosquito NF36
- No. 266 Squadron RAF; Typhoon Ia, Ib
- No. 274 Squadron RAF; Tempest V
- No. 275 Squadron RAF; Sycamore HR13, HR14
- No. 278 Squadron RAF; Lysander IIa, Walrus I, II, Anson I
- No. 288 Squadron RAF; Hurricane I, Defiant TT II/III
- No. 303 Polish Fighter Squadron; Spitfire IX, Mustang IV (1944, 1945)
- No. 306 Polish Fighter Squadron; Mustang III
- No. 307 Polish Night Fighter Squadron; Mosquito XXX
- No. 309 (Polish) Squadron; Mustang III, IV
- No. 312 (Czechoslovak) Squadron RAF; Spitfire XI
- No. 315 (Polish) Squadron; Mustang III
- No. 316 (Polish) Squadron; Mustang III
- No. 318 (Polish) Squadron RAF; Spitfire IX
- No. 409 Squadron RCAF; Beaufighter VI
- No. 453 Squadron RAAF; Spitfire IX
- No. 488 Squadron RNZAF; Beaufighter II
- No. 602 Squadron RAF; Spitfire IX, XVI
- No. 603 Squadron RAF; Spitfire XVI (1945)
- No. 604 Squadron RAF; Beaufighter I
- No. 610 Squadron RAF; Spitfire Vb, Vc
- No. 611 Squadron RAF; Spitfire IX
- No. 616 Squadron RAF; Spitfire I
- 809 Naval Air Squadron, Fleet Air Arm; Sea Hornet F20, NF21
- 819 Naval Air Squadron, Fleet Air Arm;
- 841 Naval Air Squadron, Fleet Air Arm; Albacore I, Swordfish I, II
- 849 Naval Air Squadron, Fleet Air Arm; Gannett AEW3, COD4, T5

=== Units ===
The following units were here at some point:

- Battle of Britain Memorial Flight (June 1969 - March 1976)
- Air Fighting Development Squadron (September 1959 - October 1962)
- US 346th Fighter Squadron;
- US 17th Night Fighter Squadron
- No. 11 Fighter Command Servicing Unit
- No. 12 Group Target Towing Flight (August - October 1941)
- No. 13 Fighter Command Servicing Unit
- No. 1489 (Target Towing) Flight (December 1941 - May 1942) became No. 1489 (Fighter) Gunnery Flight (May 1942 - April 1943)
- No. 2719 Squadron RAF Regiment
- No. 2725 Squadron RAF Regiment
- No. 2735 Squadron RAF Regiment
- No. 2812 Squadron RAF Regiment
- No. 2885 Squadron RAF Regiment
- No. 3206 Servicing Commando
- No. 3210 Servicing Commando
- Eastern Sector HQ (January 1947 - July 1958)
- Fighter Command Navigation Radio Conversion Flight
- Jaguar Training Flight
- Lightning Conversion Squadron RAF (January 1960 - August 1961)
- Lightning Special Engineering Project Team (April 1972 - April 1974)

== Redevelopment ==
The former married quarters were transferred to the MoD's preferred property agents, Annington Homes, who started a lengthy process of upgrading the former military housing into civilian houses for sale on the open market.

During January 2007, the Home Office expressed an interest in the site, and in early February earmarked it for potential use as an immigration detention facility, but this was subsequently ruled out.

In July 2007, a petition was set up on the 10 Downing Street website to campaign for Coltishall to be reopened as a civil airfield.

In December 2007, fresh reports in the media suggested the site would be used as a prison, but this angered local residents who had not been informed of the disposal progress.

In January 2009, plans to build a Category C prison at the site was approved by North Norfolk District Council (NNDC). The entire technical site then became under the control of the Ministry of Justice (MoJ), and building works to convert all of the former male single-persons living accommodation H-blocks and the Junior Ranks Mess and NAAFI social club, along with the completion of the dual perimeter fences, and a new access road began in 2009. This new establishment became known as HM Prison Bure, named after the nearby River Bure, can house over 500 male sex offenders.

On 19 July 2010, North Norfolk District Council proposed that the entire site should be designated as a conservation area (United Kingdom) because of its historical and architectural interest.

In 2013, the remainder of the former RAF Coltishall technical site became known as the Scottow Enterprise Park, taking up approximately 600 acres of the former RAF base. Its repurposed military buildings are now home to tenants in industries from construction to film.

In April 2015, Scottow Moor Solar Limited built a 32 megawatts (43,000 electric horsepower) solar farm on the site. In April 2016, another 18 megawatts (24,000 electric horsepower) of solar panels were added, bringing the solar farm's total capacity to 50 megawatts (67,000 electric horsepower).

In June 2019, a British aircraft manufacturer became established at the airfield. Swift Aircraft have been allowed to produce up to 98 aircraft a year, and use its runway for up to eight flights per day by the local government. This will employ roughly 100 local people.

The main guardroom has been turned into a Heritage Centre documenting the history of the site.

== Heritage ==
=== Station badge and motto ===
RAF Coltishall's badge, awarded in January 1953, features a fortified tower with a clenched gauntlet holding three blue arrows (bind bolts). The tower relates to the strength in defence of the station. The gauntlet and arrows represent the fighter aircraft based at the station and their aggressive nature.

The station's motto is 'Aggressive in Defence'.

=== Gate guardians ===
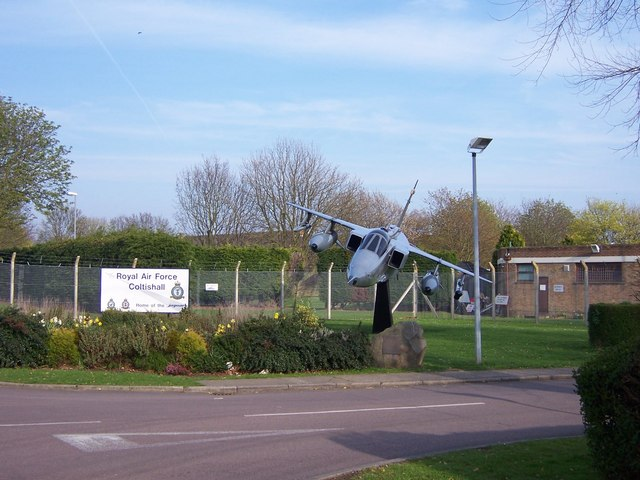
SEPECAT Jaguar S on display outside the main gate to the station

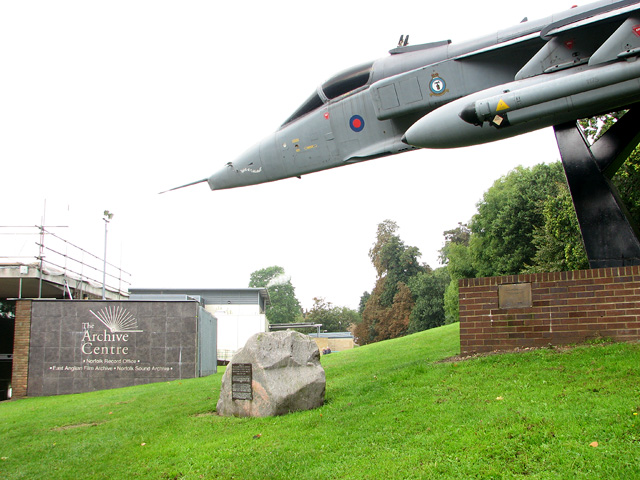
Spirit of Coltishall, the former RAF Coltishall SEPECAT Jaguar S gate guardian now on display in the grounds of County Hall, Norfolk County Council

Prior to closure, Coltishall had two gate guardians. The first (on display outside the main gate and security fence) was a Jaguar S which was an airframe formed from various Jaguars, including the front fuselage of XW563. It arrived from RAF Brüggen in 2001 and was on display at the main gate until February 2007 when it was relocated to Norfolk County Hall.

A replica fibreglass Hawker Hurricane was on display on the roundabout in front of Station Headquarters from 1989, until it was relocated to RAF High Wycombe in October 2006.

=== Built heritage ===
In September 2010, the former RAF Coltishall site was designated as a conservation area by North Norfolk District Council and Broadland District Council.

Parts of the airfield were designated as scheduled monuments in March 2008. The designation covers a single Second World War era aircraft dispersal point (labeled as a 'fighter pen') and eight pairs of Cold War era dispersal revetment blast walls dating from the 1950s. Historic England describes the blast walls as rare and outstandingly well preserved.

The former Officers' Mess was designated as a grade II listed building in October 2017. The neo-Georgian style building was built between 1939 and 1940.

On July 18, 2024, Jaguar XZ384 left storage RAF Cosford arriving on July 19 at the former RAF Coltishall, where it has been placed as an exhibit next to the Java Bean Cafe and Coffee Roasters on site.

== See also ==
- List of Battle of Britain airfields
- List of former Royal Air Force stations
