= Surrey Trophy =

English rugby union competition

- Sport: Rugby Union
- Instituted: 2009; 17 years ago
- Number of teams: 8
- Country: England
- Holders: Chipstead (1st title) (2021-22)
- Most titles: Chobham (3 titles)
- Website: Surrey RFU

The Surrey Trophy is an annual rugby union knock-out club competition organized by the Surrey Rugby Football Union. It was introduced in 2009 and the inaugural winners were London Irish Wild Geese. It is the second most important rugby union cup competition in Surrey, behind the Surrey Cup but ahead of the Surrey Shield and Surrey Bowl.

The Surrey Trophy is currently open to club sides based in Surrey and parts of south London, that play in tier 6 (London 1 South), tier 7 (London 2 South West) and tier 8 (London 3 South West) of the English rugby union league system. The current format is a knockout cup with a quarter-final, semi-finals and a final to be held at Molesey Road (Esher's home ground) in May on the same date and same venue as the other Surrey finals.

== Surrey Trophy winners ==
Surrey Trophy Finals
Season	Winner	Score	Runners–up	Venue
2009-10	London Irish Wild Geese	11-6	Cobham	Imber Court Sports Ground, East Moseley
2010-11	London Irish Wild Geese	15-14	Sutton & Epsom	Imber Court Sports Ground, East Moseley
2011-12	Cobham	20-15	Sutton & Epsom	Imber Court Sports Ground, East Moseley
2012-13	Chobham		Sutton & Epsom	Molesey Road, Hersham
2013-14	Guildford	43-5	Old Reigatians	Molesey Road, Hersham
2014-15	Guildford	22-19	KCS Old Boys	Molesey Road, Hersham
2015-16	Camberley	8-5	Battersea Ironsides	Molesey Road, Hersham
2016-17	Chobham	38-7	Battersea Ironsides	Molesey Road, Hersham
2017-18	Chobham	24-19	Effingham & Leatherhead	Molesey Road, Hersham
2021-22	Chipstead	24-20	Effingham & Leatherhead	Molesey Road, Hersham
2022-23				
2023-24	KCS Old Boys	48-28	Old Tiffinians	Grist Memorial Ground, Hampton Court

D

== Number of wins ==
- Chobham (3)
- Guildford (2)
- London Irish Wild Geese (2)
- Camberley (1)
- Cobham (1)
- KCS Old Boys (1)
- Chipstead (1)

== See also ==
- Surrey RFU
- Surrey Cup
- Surrey Shield
- Surrey Bowl
