= KCS Old Boys RFC =

English rugby team

KCS Old Boys
- Full name: King's College School Old Boys Rugby Football Club
- Union: Surrey RFU
- Founded: 1907; 119 years ago
- Location: Motspur Park, Kingston, London, England
- Ground(s): Dornan Fields, Motspur Park
- League: Counties 2 Surrey
- 2025-26: 11th (r)
Home kit

Official website
- www.pitchero.com/clubs/kcsoldboysrfc/

King's College School Old Boys RFC is a rugby union club founded in 1907 for the alumni of King's College School, Wimbledon. These days the club is widely referred to as 'King's Rugby' which reflects the open nature of the club. The 1XV currently compete in Counties 2 Surrey at level 8 of the RFU pyramid whilst the 2XV, U22s and veterans play in the Surrey Rugby reserve leagues.

The club's constituent bodies are L&SE RFU and Surrey RFU to which the club has provided numerous administrators including two Presidents – John Hamilton (1999–2001) and Darryl Druckman (2018–19).

== Club location ==
For a long time the club operated out of a modest wooden clubhouse situated close to Robin Hood Way on the A3, but that burnt down in the late 1980s and after a brief homeless period King's arrived at their current location in Motspur Park, the new clubhouse opening on 11 September 1993. The building was unusual in that it was constructed in such a way that two identical halves were built – King's occupying one and Old Blues RFC (Christ's Hospital old boys) the other. That arrangement remains to this day.

In 2020 efforts began to raise the means to add a balcony to the clubhouse the fundraising for which was a great success with the club going on to win the Canterbury Club of the Month for June 2021 in recognition of the achievement and profiling the club and its history more generally. The building work was substantially completed in 2021 and the balcony officially opened by club president Tony Allen on 16 February 2022.

== Senior section ==
Until the advent of the RFU league system the club's fixture calendar was made up of a series of friendly games against other local old boys' sides including Old Paulines, Old Cranleighan, Old Whitgiftian and many others. When the leagues started in the 1990s King's were placed in Surrey 1 where they remained until 2003 when the 1XV were promoted to London 4 South West and three seasons later promoted again to London 3 South West. In the years that followed he club remained predominantly in that league (which from 2009 to 2022 was known as London 2 South West).

Finally, in 2018–19 King's won London 2SW in a record breaking season which saw the 1XV record an unprecedented 22 wins from 22 games with 22 try bonus points and achieve a maximum tally of 110 points – a first for London 2SW (previously London Cornish had gone undefeated in 2016–17 but drew two games including one versus King's). The achievement earned the club recognition in the national rugby press with coverage in Rugby World Magazine, Rugby Club Magazine, The Rugby Paper and on the 5 Live Sport Rugby Union Weekly podcast. King's 1XV were the first team in the country to be promoted in 2018–19 as confirmed league winners, doing so in mid-February.

The club's player base was originally drawn predominantly from alumni of KCS but with the passing of the years has become increasingly diverse with representation from throughout the UK and a notable contingent from South Africa and Zimbabwe in the 1990s and 2000s. The club has seen a number of senior players achieve international honours for minor rugby nations including Zimbabwe, Hungary, Denmark, Norway, Slovenia, Gibraltar and Jamaica 7s.

Historically the club has maintained a good relationship with Harlequins and a number of Quins players have begun their coaching careers at King's alongside their playing commitments including George Robson, Joe Gray, Charlie Matthews and Will Evans.

== Cup competitions and 7s ==
The club regularly competes in the Surrey Cup – and were winners in 1983 beating Guildford & Godalming then runners-up in 1984 to Sutton & Epsom. Indeed, the late 1970s and early 1980s was a stellar period for the club and even saw them compete in the national RFU Knockout Cup. More recently, in 2015, the 1XV finished as runners-up in the Surrey Cup narrowly defeated by Guildford (the successor club to Guildford & Godalming) in the first Surrey Cup final to be settled by a 'golden score' in extra-time.

In 2023–24 King's won the L&SE section of the RFU Papa John's Community Counties 1 Championship Cup defeating Dartfordians, Old Tiffinians and Teddington to progress to a national semi-final away against Longlevens, winners of the RFU SW Division section. In a high-scoring match the home side won 56–40 to progress to a final at Twickenham against Widnes who were also defeated as the Gloucestershire club were crowned champions.

The club has had periodic success in 7s competitions over the years including a 1963 appearance at Twickenham when the club reached the finals of the Middlesex Sevens. More recently in 2017 a club side, the 'King Prawns', won the 2017 Surrey Sevens.

== Mini and Junior section ==
Since 1993, King’s has maintained Mini and Junior sections comprising children of various age groups who train weekly and participate in festivals across southeast England and beyond. Many participants have progressed to higher levels of competition. Notable former players include Mark Tampin and Hayden Hyde from the Junior section; and from the Mini section Jake Murray and most famously Alex Corbisiero. Corbisiero later became an international prop forward earning 31 caps for England and two for the British & Irish Lions. He was part of the 2013 tour to Australia which the Lions a series they won 2–1, and scored a try in the third Test.

== Honours ==
- London 2 South West – champions 2018–19
- Surrey 1 – champions 2002–2003; runners-up 1999–2000, 2001–02 (lost promotion play-off final)
- Surrey Cup – winners 1982–83; runners-up 1983–84, 2014–2015
- Surrey Trophy – winners 2023–24
- Surrey Shield – winners 2000–01, 2001–02; runners-up 2002–03
- Surrey 7s – winners 2017
- Middlesex Sevens – finalists 1963

== Notable Former Mini & Junior players ==
- Alex Corbisiero – London Irish, Northampton Saints, England, British & Irish Lions
- / Jake Hennessey – Harlequins Academy, Scotland U19, Kent, Cambridge University, Cambridge, Blackheath, England 7s
- (Republic of Ireland) / Hayden Hyde – Ulster Academy, Ireland U20, Harlequins, London Scottish (dual-reg), Ealing Trailfinders, England 7s
- (England) Jake Murray – Harlequins Senior Academy, Rams (dual-reg), Exeter Chiefs
- (England) Mark Tampin – Leeds Tykes, Rotherham Titans, Jersey Reds, Ealing Trailfinders, Newcastle Falcons
