= Surrey Cup =

English rugby union competition

- Sport: Rugby Union
- Instituted: 1890; 136 years ago
- Number of teams: 2
- Country: England
- Holders: Weybridge Vandals RFC (1st title) (2018-19)
- Most titles: Sutton & Epsom (10 titles)
- Website: Surrey RFU

The Surrey Cup is an annual rugby union knock-out club competition organized by the Surrey Rugby Football Union. The original cup competition was first played for back in 1890, the inaugural winners being Lennox, but was discontinued in 1909, having been held intermittently over 20 seasons, due to cup competitions being considerable 'undesirable'. The cup was reintroduced around 50 years later for the 1970–71 season, with the first winners of the modern competition being Guildford & Godalming. It is the most important rugby union cup competition in Surrey, ahead of the Surrey Trophy, Surrey Shield and Surrey Bowl.

At present the Surrey Cup is a much smaller competition than it used to be with only a few clubs based in tier 5 (National League 3 London & SE) of the English rugby union league system taking part along with 2nd teams of teams in tiers 3-4 (National League 1 and National League 2 South). The final is held at Molesey Road, Hersham (home of Esher RFC) in May - on the same date and venue as the other Surrey finals.

== Surrey Cup winners ==
Surrey Cup Finals
Season	Winner	Score	Runners–up	Venue
1889-90	Lennox			
1891-92	No competition			
1893-94	Streatham			
1894-95	Streatham			
1895-96	Streatham			
1896-97	Sutton			
1897-98	Sutton			
1898-99	Battersea			
1899-1900	Surbiton			
1901-02	No competition			
1902-03	Streatham			
1903-04	Kingston			
1904-05	Old Whitgiftian			
1905-06	Customs Sports			
1906-07	London Devonians			
1907-08	London Devonians			
1908-09	Sutton			
1910-69	No competition			
1970-71	Guildford & Godalming		Old Reigatian	
1971-72	Guildford & Godalming		Old Alleynians	
1972-73	Camberley		Guildford & Godalming	
1973-74	Streatham-Croydon		Esher	
1974-75	Streatham-Croydon		Esher	
1975-76	Esher		Old Surbitonians	
1976-77	Esher		Old Whitgiftian	
1977-78	Esher		Old Reigatian	
1978-79	Esher		Old Walcountians	
1979-80	Guildford & Godalming		Sutton & Epsom	
1980-81	London Irish		Streatham-Croydon	
1981-82	London Irish		Old Emanuel	
1982-83	KCS Old Boys		Guildford & Godalming	
1983-84	Sutton & Epsom		KCS Old Boys	
1984-85	Old Mid-Whitgiftian		Guildford & Godalming	
1985-86	London Irish		Old Reigatian	
1986-87	London Irish		Old Alleynians	
1987-88	Old Mid-Whitgiftian		Guildford & Godalming	
1988-89	Old Alleynians		Streatham-Croydon	
1989-90	Sutton & Epsom		Old Mid-Whitgiftians	
1990-91	Sutton & Epsom		Old Mid-Whitgiftians	
1991-92	Old Alleynians		Old Blues	
1992-93	Old Mid-Whitgiftian		Dorking	
1993-94	Esher		Sutton & Epsom	
1994-95	Camberley		Old Blues	
1995-96	Esher		Sutton & Epsom	
1996-97	Sutton & Epsom		Wimbledon	
1997-98	Camberley		Wimbledon	
1998-99	Effingham & Leatherhead	23-9	Dorking	Rugby Lane, Cheam, London
1999-2000	Sutton & Epsom		Camberley	
2000-01	Richmond		Dorking	The Avenue, Sunbury-on-Thames
2001-02	Richmond		Sutton & Epsom	
2002-03	Richmond		Sutton & Epsom	
2003-04	Richmond		Esher	
2004-05	Rosslyn Park		Guildford	
2005-06	Richmond		Guildford	
2006-07	Richmond		Sutton & Epsom	
2007-08	Sutton & Epsom		Chobham	Imber Court Sports Club, East Molesey
2008-09	Sutton & Epsom	41-27	Dorking	Imber Court Sports Club, East Molesey
2009-10	Dorking	32-10	Richmond	Imber Court Sports Club, East Molesey
2010-11	Esher	26-12	Dorking	Imber Court Sports Club, East Molesey
2011-12	Esher	24-17	Dorking	Imber Court Sports Club, East Molesey
2012-13	London Irish Wild Geese	33-12	Dorking	Molesey Road, Hersham
2013-14	Dorking	22-8	Esher	Molesey Road, Hersham
2014-15	Guildford	22-19	KCS Old Boys	Molesey Road, Hersham
2015-16	No competition			
2016-17	Dorking	32-5	Guildford	Molesey Road, Hersham
2017-18	Wimbledon II	19-17	Esher II	Molesey Road, Hersham
2018-19	Weybridge Vandals	31-25	Old Mid-Whifgiftian	Molesey Road, Hersham

== Number of wins ==
- Sutton & Epsom (10) (Note: Includes 3 titles won by Sutton FC.)
- Esher (8)
- Richmond (6)
- Streatham-Croydon (6) (Note: Includes 4 titles won by Streatham RFC.)
- Guildford (4) (Note: Includes 3 titles won when known as Guildford & Godalming.)
- London Irish (4)
- Camberley (3)
- Dorking (3)
- Old Mid-Whitgiftians (3)
- London Devonians (2)
- Old Alleynians (2)
- Battersea (1)
- Customs Sports (1)
- Effingham & Leatherhead (1)
- Kingston (1)
- KCS Old Boys (1)
- Lennox (1)
- London Irish Wild Geese (1)
- Old Whitgiftian (1)
- Rosslyn Park (1)
- Surbiton (1)
- Wimbledon II (1)
- Weybridge Vandals (1)

== See also ==
- Surrey Bowl
- Surrey RFU
- Surrey Shield
- Surrey Trophy
