= Surrey Shield =

English rugby union competition

- Sport: Rugby Union
- Instituted: 1998; 28 years ago
- Number of teams: 11
- Country: England
- Holders: Old Freemen's (5th title) (2016–17)
- Most titles: Old Freemen's (5 titles)
- Website: Surrey RFU

The Surrey Shield is an annual rugby union knock-out club competition organised by the Surrey Rugby Football Union. It was introduced in 1998 and the inaugural winners were Cobham. It is the third most important rugby union cup competition in Surrey, behind the Surrey Cup and Surrey Trophy but ahead of the Surrey Bowl.

The Surrey Shield is currently open to club sides based in Surrey and parts of south London, that play in tier 9 (Surrey 1) and tier 10 (Surrey 2) of the English rugby union league system. The format is a knockout cup with a first round, quarter-final, semi-finals and final to be held at Molesey Road (Esher's home ground) in May on the same date and same venue as the other Surrey finals.

== Surrey Shield winners ==
Surrey Shield Finals
Season	Winner	Score	Runners–up	Venue
1998–99	Cobham		Chobham	
1999-00	Chobham		Merton	
2000–01	KCS Old Boys		Kingston	
2001–02	KCS Old Boys	21–3	Old Whitgiftian	Croham Road, South Croydon, London
2002–03	Old Whitgiftian	24–12	KCS Old Boys	Arthur Road, Motspur Park, London
2003–04	Cranleigh		Old Reigatian	
2004–05	Old Freemen's		Chipstead	
2005–06	Old Freemen's		Old Haileyburians	
2006–07	Old Whitgiftian	13–12	Cranleigh	Imber Court Sports Ground, East Molesey
2007–08	Kingston		Old Emanuel	Imber Court Sports Ground, East Molesey
2008–09	Old Walcountians	27–24	Old Whitgiftian	Imber Court Sports Ground, East Molesey
2009–10	Chipstead	27–12	Cranleigh	Imber Court Sports Ground, East Molesey
2010–11	Old Freemen's	43–5	Old Blues	Imber Court Sports Ground, East Molesey
2011–12	Old Wimbledonians	31–17	Old Whitgiftian	Imber Court Sports Ground, East Molesey
2012–13	Battersea Ironsides	39–26	Old Freemen's	Molesey Road, Hersham
2013–14	Old Wimbledonians	18–17	Old Walcountians	Molesey Road, Hersham
2014–15	Battersea Ironsides	26–20	Camberley	Molesey Road, Hersham
2015–16	Old Whitgiftian	53–33	Cranleigh	Molesey Road, Hersham
2016–17	Old Freemen's	27–10	Old Walcountians	Molesey Road, Hersham
2017–18	Old Freemen's	30–24	Old Mid-Whitgiftian	Molesey Road, Hersham
2018–19				

== Number of wins ==
- Old Freemen's (5)
- Old Whitgiftian (3)
- Battersea Ironsides (2)
- KCS Old Boys (2)
- Old Wimbledonians (2)
- Chipstead (1)
- Chobham (1)
- Cobham (1)
- Cranleigh (1)
- Kingston (1)
- Old Walcountians (1)

== See also ==
- Surrey RFU
- Surrey Cup
- Surrey Trophy
- Surrey Bowl
