= Surrey 1 =

English Rugby Union League

- Current season or competition: 2021-22 Surrey 1
- Sport: Rugby union
- Instituted: 1987; 39 years ago
- Number of teams: 10
- Country: England
- Holders: Kingston RFC (1st title) (2021-22) (promoted to London 3 South West)
- Most titles: Kingston RFC Cranleigh, Farnham, Old Guildfordians, Old Wellingtonians, Old Whitgiftian, Reeds Weybridge (2 titles)
- Website: englandrugby.com

Surrey 1 is a level 9 English Rugby Union League. It is made up of teams predominantly from Surrey and south-west London. Teams play home and away matches from September through to April. Promoted teams move up to London 3 South West with the league winners going straight up and the runners up playing against the runners up from Hampshire Premier. Relegated teams drop to Surrey 2.

Each year some of the clubs in this division also take part in the RFU Junior Vase - a level 9-12 national competition.

== Teams for 2021-22 ==
The teams competing in 2021-22 achieved their places in the league based on performances in 2019–20, the 'previous season' column in the table below refers to that season not 2020–21.

Team	Ground	Capacity	City/Area	Previous season
Effingham & Leatherhead	King George V Playing Fields		Effingham, Surrey	Relegated from London 3 South West (12th)
Kingston	Hook Road		Chessington, London	3rd
Law Society	King's College Sportsground		New Malden, London	2nd
Old Amplefordians	Dornan Fields		Motspur Park, London	Promoted from Surrey 2 (champions)
Old Haileyburians	Ruxley Lane		Epsom, Surrey	7th
Old Rutlishians	Old Rutlishians' Sports Ground		Merton Park, London	Promoted from Surrey 2 (runners up)
Old Whitgiftian	Whitgift Sports Club		South Croydon, London	6th
Purley John Fisher	Parsons Pightle		Old Coulsdon, London	8th
Teddington	Udney Park Sports Ground		Teddington, London	5th
Trinity	Trinity Sanderstead Sports & Social Club		Sanderstead, London	4th

Locations of the 2021-22 Surrey 1 teams in Greater London
Locations of the 2021-22 Surrey 1 teams in Surrey

== Season 2020–21 ==
On 30 October the RFU announced that a decision had been taken to cancel Adult Competitive Leagues (National League 1 and below) for the 2020/21 season meaning Surrey 1 was not contested.

== Teams for 2019-20 ==
Team	Ground	Capacity	City/Area	Previous season
Chipstead	Chipstead Meads Recreation Ground		Chipstead, Surrey	6th
Kingston	Hook Road		Chessington, London	Promoted from Surrey 2 (runners up)
Law Society	King's College Sportsground		New Malden, London	4th
Old Freemens	Ashtead Park		Ashtead, Surrey	8th
Old Haileyburians	Ruxley Lane		Epsom, Surrey	5th
Old Walcountians	Clockhouse Ground		Woodmansterne, Surrey	3rd
Old Whitgiftian	Whitgift Sports Club		South Croydon, London	Relegated from London 3 SW (10th)
Purley John Fisher	Parsons Pightle		Old Coulsdon, London	Promoted from Surrey 2 (champions)
Teddington	Udney Park Sports Ground		Teddington, London	Relegated from London 3 SW (12th)
Trinity (Note: Trinity were until the 2018-19 season known as Old Mid-Whitgiftian.)	Trinity Sanderstead Sports & Social Club		Sanderstead, London	7th

Locations of the 2019-20 Surrey 1 teams in Greater London
Locations of the 2019-20 Surrey 1 teams in Surrey

== Teams for 2018-19 ==
Team	Ground	Capacity	City/Area	Previous season
Chipstead	Chipstead Meads Recreation Ground		Chipstead, Surrey	5th
Law Society	King's College Sportsground		New Malden, London	8th
Old Amplefordians	Dornan Fields		Motspur Park, London	9th (not relegated)
Old Freemens	Ashtead Park		Ashtead, Surrey	4th
Old Haileyburians	Ruxley Lane		Epsom, Surrey	Promoted from Surrey 2 (runners up)
Old Mid-Whitgiftian	Trinity Sanderstead Sports & Social Club		Sanderstead, London	3rd
Old Walcountians	Clockhouse Ground		Woodmansterne, Surrey	6th
Old Wimbledonians	Old Wimbledonians & Donhead Sports Ground		Raynes Park, London	7th
Reeds Weybridge	North Avenue		Whiteley Village, Surrey	Promoted from Surrey 2 (champions)
Weybridge Vandals	Brownacres		Walton-on-Thames, Surrey	Relegated from London 3 SW (10th)

Locations of the 2018-19 Surrey 1 teams in Greater London
Locations of the 2018-19 Surrey 1 teams in Surrey

== Teams for 2017-18 ==
Team	Ground	Capacity	City/Area	Previous season
Chipstead	Chipstead Meads Recreation Ground		Chipstead, Surrey	8th
Law Society	King's College Sportsground		New Malden, London	9th
Old Amplefordians	Dornan Fields		Motspur Park, London	6th
Old Blues	Dornan Fields		Motspur Park, London	Promoted from Surrey 2 (champions)
Old Freemens	Ashtead Park		Ashtead, Surrey	3rd
Old Georgians	St George's College		Addlestone, Surrey	5th
Old Mid-Whitgiftian	Trinity Sanderstead Sports & Social Club		Sanderstead, London	7th
Old Walcountians	Clockhouse Ground		Woodmansterne, Surrey	Promoted from Surrey 2 (runners up)
Old Whitgiftian	Whitgift Sports Club		South Croydon, London	2nd (lost play-off)
Old Wimbledonians	Old Wimbledonians & Donhead Sports Ground		Raynes Park, London	4th

Locations of the 2017-18 Surrey 1 teams in Greater London
Locations of the 2017-18 Surrey 1 teams in Surrey

== Teams for 2016-17 ==
- Chipstead
- Law Society
- Old Amplefordians (promoted from Surrey 2)
- Old Emanuel
- Old Freemans
- Old Georgians (promoted from Surrey 2)
- Old Mid-Whitgiftian
- Old Wellingtonians
- Old Whitgiftian
- Old Wimbledonians
- Purley John Fisher (relegated from London 3 South West)

== Teams for 2015-16 ==
- Chipstead
- Kingston
- Law Society
- Old Cranleighans
- Old Emanuel (promoted from Surrey 2)
- Old Freemans (promoted from Surrey 2)
- Old Paulines
- Old Wellingtonians
- Old Whitgiftian
- Old Wimbledonians

== Teams for 2014-15 ==
- Battersea Ironsides
- Camberley (relegated from London 3 South West)
- Chipstead (promoted from Surrey 2)
- Kingston
- Law Society (promoted from Surrey 2)
- Old Cranleighans (relegated from London 3 South West)
- Old Paulines
- Old Wellingtonians (relegated from London 3 South West)
- Old Whitgiftian
- Old Wimbledonians

== Teams for 2013-14 ==
- Battersea Ironsides
- Kingston
- Old Blues
- Old Freemens
- Old Paulines
- Old Tiffinians
- Old Tonbridgians
- Old Walcountians
- Old Whitgiftian
- Old Wimbledonians

== Teams for 2012-13 ==
- Cranleigh
- Croydon
- Farnham
- Kingston
- Old Cranleighans
- Old Freemens
- Old Tiffinians
- Old Walcountians
- Old Whitgiftian
- Old Wimbledonians

== Original teams ==
When league rugby began in 1987 this division contained the following teams:

- Cranleigh
- Dorking
- Old Guildfordians (Note: Old Guildfordians would merge with Guildford & Godalming in 2003 to form Guildford Rugby Club.)
- Old Blues
- Old Cranleighans
- Old Rutlishians
- Old Surbitonians (Note: Old Surbitonians would be renamed as Cobham RFC in 1989.)
- Old Tiffinians
- Old Wimbledonians
- John Fisher Old Boys (Note: John Fisher Old Boys would merge with Purley RFC in 1997 to form Purley John Fisher RFC.)

== Surrey 1 honours ==
=== Surrey 1 (1987–1993) ===
The original Surrey 1 was tier 8 league with promotion up to London 3 South West and relegation down to Surrey 2.

Surrey 1
Season	No of Teams	Champions	Runners–up	Relegated Teams
1987–88	10	Old Guildfordians	Dorking	John Fisher Old Boys (Note: John Fisher Old Boys would drop to Surrey 2B.)
1988–89	11	Dorking	Old Blues	Old Surbitonians (Note: Relegated Old Surbitonians would rename as Cobham RFC for the following season, playing in Surrey 2.)
1989–90	11	Old Blues	Old Wimbledonians	Old Cranleighans, Old Tiffinians
1990–91	11	Cranleigh	Wimbledon	Merton, Harrodians
1991–92	11	Old Wimbledonians	Warlingham	No relegation (Note: No relegation as Surrey 1 due to increase from 11 to 13 seasons for the following season.)
1992–93	13	Old Guildfordians	Wimbledon	Cobham
Green backgrounds are promotion places.

=== Surrey 1 (1993–1996) ===
The creation of National 5 South meant that Surrey 1 dropped from a tier 8 league to a tier 9 league for the years that National 5 South was active. Promotion and relegation continued to London 3 South West and Surrey 2 respectively.

Surrey 1
Season	No of Teams	Champions	Runners–up	Relegated Teams
1993–94	13	Wimbledon	Weybridge Vandals	Mitcham
1994–95	13	Old Whitgiftian	Barnes	Raynes Park, Old Rutlishians
1995–96	13	Barnes	Old Reedonians	Farnham, Shirley Wanderers
Green backgrounds are promotion places.

=== Surrey 1 (1996–2000) ===
The cancellation of National 5 South at the end of the 1995–96 season meant that Surrey 1 reverted to being a tier 8 league. Promotion and relegation continued to London 3 South West and Surrey 2 respectively.

Surrey 1
Season	No of Teams	Champions	Runners–up	Relegated Teams
1996–97	13	Old Reedonians	Effingham (Note: 3rd place Weybridge Vandals also promoted.)	No relegation (Note: Although there was no relegation, John Fisher Old Boys would drop out of the Surrey leagues to merge with Purley RFC to form Purley John Fisher RFC, playing in London 3 South West.)
1997–98	13	Cranleigh	Chobham	Kingston, Battersea Ironsides
1998–99	13	Cobham	Chobham	Wandsworthians, Chipstead
1999–00	13	Chobham	KCS Old Boys	No relegation (Note: No relegation due to league restructuring for the following season as Surrey 4 abolished and extra teams added to Surrey 1 (and other divisions) as a result.)
Green backgrounds are promotion places.

=== Surrey 1 (2000–2009) ===
The introduction of London 4 South West ahead of the 2000–01 season meant Surrey 1 dropped to become a tier 9 league with promotion to this new division. Relegation continued to Surrey 2.

Surrey 1
Season	No of Teams	Champions	Runners–up	Relegated Teams
2000–01	17	Farnham	Kingston	Streatham-Croydon, Woking
2001–02	17	London Irish Amateur	KCS Old Boys	Old Walcountians, Raynes Park, Old Alleynians
2002–03	17	KCS Old Boys	Old Paulines	Merton, Kingston
2003–04	17	Old Amplefordians	Old Reigatian	Reeds Weybridge
2004–05	16	Old Wellingtonians	London Cornish	Multiple teams (Note: Streatham-Croydon, Old Cranleighans, Old Rutlishians, Old Haileyburians, Old Freemens and Old Whitgiftian were the relegated teams this season. The reason for the many relegations was the reinstatement of Surrey 4 for the 2005-06 season, meaning that teams dropped into Surrey 2 to replace teams that had in turn dropped to Surrey 3 and in turn to the new Surrey 4.)
2005–06	10	Warlingham	Old Caterhamians	Old Blues
2006–07	11	Old Wellingtonians	London South Africa	Law Society, Old Emanuel
2007–08	10	Kingston	Old Alleynians	Old Amplefordians, Cranleigh
2008–09	10	Old Paulines	Old Whitgiftian	Old Caterhamians
Green backgrounds are promotion places.

=== Surrey 1 (2009–present) ===
Surrey 1 remained a tier 9 league despite national restructuring by the RFU. Promotion was to London 3 South West (formerly London 4 South West) and relegation to Surrey 2.

Surrey 1
Season	No of Teams	Champions	Runners–up	Relegated Teams
2009–10	10	Teddington	Old Whitgiftian	Farnham, Battersea Ironsides
2010–11	11	Old Freemens	Old Blues	Chipstead, Bec Old Boys
2011–12	10	London Exiles	Old Paulines	CL London
2012–13	10	Farnham	Old Cranleighans	Croydon, Cranleigh
2013–14	10	Old Tiffinians	Old Tonbridgians	Old Freemens, Old Blues, Old Walcountians
2014–15	10	Battersea Ironsides	Camberley	Old Wellingtonians, Chipstead
2015–16	10	Old Cranleighans	Old Freemens	Old Paulines, Kingston
2016–17	11	Old Emanuel	Old Whitgiftian	Purley John Fisher, Old Wellingtonians
2017–18	10	Old Whitgiftian	Old Georgians	Old Blues
2018–19	10	Reeds Weybridge	Weybridge Vandals	Old Wimbledonians, Old Amplefordians
2019–20	10	Old Walcountians	Law Society	Chipstead, Old Freemens
2020–21	10			
Green backgrounds are promotion places.

== Promotion play-offs ==
Since the 2000–01 season there has been a play-off between the runners-up of Hampshire Premier and Surrey 1 for the third and final promotion place to London 3 South West. The team with the superior league record has home advantage in the tie. At the end of the 2019–20 season the Surrey 1 teams have been the most successful with twelve wins to the Hampshire Premier teams seven; and the home team has won promotion on eleven occasions compared to the away teams eight.

Hampshire Premier v Surrey 1 promotion play-off results
Season	Home team	Score	Away team	Venue	Attendance
2000–01	Trojans (H)	15-14	Kingston (S)	Stoneham Lane, Eastleigh, Hampshire	
2001–02	Southampton (H)	27-18	KCS Old Boys (S)	Test Park Playing Fields, Southampton, Hampshire	
2002–03	Farnborough (H)	5-63	Old Paulines (S)	Oak Farm Playing Fields, Farnborough, Hampshire	
2003–04	Trojans (H)	14-46	Old Reigatian (S)	Stoneham Lane, Eastleigh, Hampshire	
2004–05	London Cornish (S)	27-14	Sandown & Shanklin (H)	Richardson Evans Memorial Playing Fields, Roehampton, London	
2005–06	United Services Portsmouth (H)	20-28	Old Caterhamians (S)	United Services Recreation Ground, Portsmouth, Hampshire	
2006–07	London South Africa (S)	71-10	Ellingham & Ringwood (H)	Wimbledon Park Athletics Stadium, Wimbledon, London	
2007–08	Sandown & Shanklin (H)	15-16	Old Alleynians (S)	The Fairway Ground, Sandown, Isle of Wight	
2008–09	Sandown & Shanklin (H)	17-10	Old Whitgiftian (S)	The Fairway Ground, Sandown, Isle of Wight	
2009–10	Petersfield (H)	19-15	Old Whitgiftian (S)	Penn's Place, Petersfield, Hampshire	
2010–11	Eastleigh (H)	30-10	Old Blues (S)	The Hub, Eastleigh, Hampshire	
2011–12	Fordingbridge (H)	11-29	Old Paulines (S)	The Recreation Ground, Fordingbridge, Hampshire	
2012–13	Old Cranleighans (S)	21-19	Fordingbridge (H)	The Old Cranleighan Club, Thames Ditton, Surrey	
2013–14	Fordingbridge (H)	6-36	Old Tonbridgians (S)	The Recreation Ground, Fordingbridge, Hampshire	
2014–15	Camberley (S)	49-10	Millbrook (H)	Watchetts Recreation Ground, Camberley, Surrey	
2015–16	Bognor (H)	HWO (Note: Bognor were promoted as Old Freemens did not manage to raise a team for the 2015-16 play-off game.)	Old Freemens (S)	Hampshire Avenue, Bognor Regis, West Sussex	
2016–17	New Milton & District (H)	41-17	Old Whitgiftian (S)	Normans Way, Ashley, Hampshire	
2017–18	Bognor (H)	7-52	Old Georgians (S)	Hampshire Avenue, Bognor Regis, West Sussex	
2018–19	Sandown & Shanklin (H)	18-22	Weybridge Vandals (S)	The Fairway Ground, Sandown, Isle of Wight	
2019–20	Cancelled due to COVID-19 pandemic in the United Kingdom. Best ranked runner up - Alton (H) - promoted instead.				
2020–21					
Green background is the promoted team. H = Hampshire Premier and S = Surrey 1

== Number of league titles ==
- Cranleigh (2)
- Farnham (2)
- Old Guildfordians (2) (Note: Old Guildfordians are currently known as Guildford Rugby Club.)
- Old Wellingtonians (2)
- Old Whitgiftian (2)
- Reeds Weybridge (2) (Note: one of Reeds Weybridge titles includes when club was known as Old Reedonians.)
- Barnes (1)
- Battersea Ironsides (1)
- Chobham (1)
- Cobham (1)
- Dorking (1)
- KCS Old Boys (1)
- Kingston (1)
- London Exiles (1)
- London Irish Amateur (1)
- Old Amplefordians (1)
- Old Blues (1)
- Old Cranleighans (1)
- Old Emanuel (1)
- Old Freemens (1)
- Old Paulines (1)
- Old Tiffinians (1)
- Old Walcountians (1)
- Old Wimbledonians (1)
- Teddington (1)
- Warlingham (1)
- Wimbledon (1)

== See also ==
- London & SE Division RFU
- Surrey RFU
- English rugby union system
- Rugby union in England
