= London 3 South West =

English rugby union league

- Current season or competition: 2019–20 London 3 South West
- Sport: Rugby union
- Instituted: 2000; 26 years ago (as London 4 South West)
- Number of teams: 11
- Country: England
- Holders: Reeds Weybridge (1st title) (2019–20) (promoted to London 2 South West)
- Most titles: Farnham, Winchester (2 titles)
- Website: englandrugby.com

London 3 South West is an English rugby union league at the eighth level of club rugby union in England involving sides based in Hampshire, Surrey and south-west London. Promoted clubs move into London 2 South West. Relegated clubs move into either Surrey 1 or Hampshire Premier depending on their location, with sides coming up from these divisions, although only 1st XV clubs are allowed in London 3 South West. Each year all clubs in the division also take part in the RFU Senior Vase - a level 8 national competition.

== Teams for 2021–22 ==
The teams competing in 2021-22 achieved their places in the league based on performances in 2019-20, the 'previous season' column in the table below refers to that season not 2020-21.

Team	Ground	Capacity	City/Area	Previous season
Alton	Antsey Park		Alton, Hampshire	Promoted from Hampshire Premier (runners-up)
Andover	Foxcotte Lane		Andover, Hampshire	8th
Basingstoke	Down Grange	2,500 (250 seats)	Basingstoke, Hampshire	7th
Old Cranleighan	Old Cranleighan Sports Club		Thames Ditton, Surrey	Relegated from London 2 SW (12th)
Old Emanuel	Blagdons Sports Ground		New Malden, London	Relegated from London 2 SW (11th)
Old Georgians	St George's College		Addlestone, Surrey	3rd
Old Walcountians	Clockhouse Ground		Woodmansterne, Surrey	Promoted from Surrey 1 (champions)
Petersfield	Penn's Place		Petersfield, Hampshire	Promoted from Hampshire Premier (champions)
Portsmouth	The Rugby Camp		Portsmouth, Hampshire	6th
Trojans	Stoneham Lane		Eastleigh, Hampshire	9th
Warlingham	Limpsfield Road		Warlingham, Surrey	4th
Weybridge Vandals	Brownacres		Walton-on-Thames, Surrey	5th

Locations of the 2021-22 London 3 South West teams in London & Surrey
Locations of the 2021–22 London 3 South West teams in Hampshire

== Season 2020–21 ==
On 30 October the RFU announced that a decision had been taken to cancel Adult Competitive Leagues (National League 1 and below) for the 2020/21 season meaning London 3 South West was not contested.

== Teams for 2019–20 ==
United Services Portsmouth who finished 5th in 2018-19 were unable to fulfil their fixtures in and withdrew from the league in November 2019.

Team	Ground	Capacity	City/Area	Previous season
Andover	Foxcotte Lane		Andover, Hampshire	8th
Basingstoke	Down Grange	2,500 (250 seats)	Basingstoke, Hampshire	Promoted from Hampshire 1 (champions)
Effingham & Leatherhead	King George V Playing Fields		Effingham, Surrey	Relegated from London 2 SW (12th)
Gosport & Fareham	Gosport Park		Gosport, Hampshire	Relegated from London 2 SW (11th)
Old Georgians	St George's College		Addlestone, Surrey	6th
Old Tiffinians	Grists Memorial Ground		East Molesey, Surrey	4th
Portsmouth	The Rugby Camp		Portsmouth, Hampshire	3rd
Reeds Weybridge	North Avenue		Whiteley Village, Surrey	Promoted from Surrey 1 (champions)
Trojans	Stoneham Lane		Eastleigh, Hampshire	7th
Warlingham	Limpsfield Road		Warlingham, Surrey	9th
Weybridge Vandals	Brownacres		Walton-on-Thames, Surrey	Promoted from Surrey 1 (playoff)

Locations of the 2019-20 London 3 South West teams in Surrey
Locations of the 2019–20 London 3 South West teams in Hampshire

== Teams for 2018–19 ==
Team	Ground	Capacity	City/Area	Previous season
Andover	Foxcotte Lane		Andover, Hampshire	Relegated from London 2 SW (12th)
Battersea Ironsides	Burntwood Lane		Earlsfield, London	4th
Old Georgians	St George's College		Addlestone, Surrey	Promoted from Surrey 1 (playoff)
Old Whitgiftian	Whitgift Sports Club		South Croydon, London	Promoted from Surrey 1 (champions)
Old Tiffinians	Grists Memorial Ground		East Molesey, Surrey	8th
Petersfield	Penn's Place		Petersfield, Hampshire	9th
Portsmouth	The Rugby Camp		Portsmouth, Hampshire	3rd
Teddington	Udney Park Sports Ground		Teddington, London	6th
Trojans	Stoneham Lane		Eastleigh, Hampshire	5th
United Services Portsmouth	Burnaby Road	8,000	Portsmouth, Hampshire	Promoted from Hampshire 1 (champions)
Warlingham	Limpsfield Road		Warlingham, Surrey	7th
Winchester	North Walls Park		Winchester, Hampshire	Relegated from London 2 SW (11th)

Locations of the 2018-19 London 3 South West teams in London & Surrey
Locations of the 2018-19 London 3 South West teams in Hampshire

== Teams for 2017–18 ==
Team	Ground	Capacity	City/Area	Previous season
Basingstoke	Down Grange	2,500 (250 seats)	Basingstoke, Hampshire	5th
Battersea Ironsides	Burntwood Lane		Earlsfield, London	7th
New Milton & District	Ashley Recreation Ground		Ashley, New Milton, Hampshire	Promoted from Hampshire 1 (playoff)
Old Cranleighans	Old Cranleighan Sports Club		Thames Ditton, Surrey	4th
Old Emanuel	Blagdons Sports Ground		New Malden, London	Promoted from Surrey 1 (champions)
Old Tiffinians	Grists Memorial Ground		East Molesey, Surrey	3rd
Petersfield	Penn's Place		Petersfield, Hampshire	Promoted from Hampshire 1 (champions)
Portsmouth	The Rugby Camp		Portsmouth, Hampshire	Relegated from London 2 South West (11th)
Teddington	Udney Park Sports Ground		Teddington, London	8th
Trojans	Stoneham Lane		Eastleigh, Hampshire	6th
Warlingham	Limpsfield Road		Warlingham, Surrey	Relegated from London 2 South West (12th)
Weybridge Vandals	Brownacres		Walton-on-Thames, Surrey	9th

Locations of the 2017-18 London 3 South West teams in London & Surrey
Locations of the 2017-18 London 3 South West teams in Hampshire

== Participating Clubs 2016-17 ==
- Battersea Ironsides
- Basingstoke (relegated from London 2 South West)
- Bognor (promoted from Hampshire 1)
- Eastleigh
- Farnham
- Milbrook (promoted from Hampshire 1)
- Old Cranleighans (promoted from Surrey 1)
- Old Tiffinians
- Teddington
- Trojans
- United Services Portsmouth
- Weybridge Vandals (relegated from London 2 South West)

== Participating Clubs 2015-16 ==
- Battersea Ironsides (promoted from Surrey 1)
- Camberley (promoted from Surrey 1)
- Eastleigh
- Farnham (relegated from London 2 South West)
- New Milton & District
- Old Tiffinians
- Old Mid-Whitgiftian
- Old Tonbridgians
- Purley John Fisher
- Teddington
- Trojans
- United Services Portsmouth (promoted from Hampshire 1 (winners))

== Participating Clubs 2014-15 ==
- Andover (promoted from Hampshire 1)
- Eastleigh
- Ellingham & Ringwood
- London Exiles
- New Milton & District
- Old Tiffinians (promoted from Surrey 1)
- Old Mid-Whitgiftian
- Old Tonbridgians (promoted from Surrey 1)
- Purley John Fisher
- Sandown & Shanklin
- Teddington (relegated from London 2 South West)
- Trojans (relegated from London 2 South West)

== Participating Clubs 2013-14 ==
- Camberley (relegated from London 2 South West)
- Eastleigh
- Ellingham & Ringwood
- Farnham (promoted from Surrey 1 (winners))
- KCS Old Boys (relegated from London 2 South West)
- London Exiles
- New Milton & District (promoted from Hampshire 1 (winners))
- Old Cranleighans (promoted from Surrey 1 (play-off winners)
- Old Mid-Whitgiftian
- Old Wellingtonian
- Purley John Fisher
- Sandown & Shanklin

== Participating Clubs 2012-13 ==
- Bognor (relegated from London 2 South West)
- Eastleigh (promoted from Hampshire 1 (winners))
- Ellingham & Ringwood
- London Exiles (promoted from Surrey 1 (winners))
- Old Blues
- Old Mid-Whitgiftian (relegated from London 2 South East)
- Old Paulines (promoted from Surrey 1 (play-off winners))
- Old Wellingtonians
- Purley John Fisher
- Sandown & Shanklin
- Weybridge Vandals
- Winchester

== Participating Clubs 2011-12 ==
- Alton
- Andover (promoted from Hampshire 1 (winners)
- Ellingham & Ringwood
- KCS Old Boys (relegated from London 2 South West)
- Old Alleynian
- Old Blues (promoted from Surrey 1 (play-off winners))
- Old Freemans (promoted from Surrey 1 (winners))
- Old Wellingtonians
- Purley John Fisher (relegated from London 2 South East)
- Sandown & Shanklin
- Weybridge Vandals (relegated from London 2 South West)
- Winchester

== Participating Clubs 2010-11 ==
- Alton (Promoted from Hampshire 1 (winners))
- Camberley
- Ellingham & Ringwood
- Fordingbridge
- London South Africa (relegated from London 2 South West)
- Old Alleynian
- Old Wellingtonians
- Old Wimbledonians
- Petersfield (Promoted from Hampshire 1 (play-off winners))
- Sandown & Shanklin
- Teddington (Promoted from Surrey 1 (winners))
- Winchester (relegated from London 2 South West)

== Participating Clubs 2009-10 ==
- Andover
- Camberley
- Ellingham & Ringwood
- Fordingbridge (promoted from Hampshire 1 (winners))
- Gosport & Fareham
- Kingston
- Old Alleynian
- Old Mid-Whitgiftian
- Old Paulines (promoted from Surrey 1 (winners)
- Old Wellingtonians
- Old Wimbledonians
- Sandown & Shanklin (promoted from Hampshire 1 (play-off winners))

== Original teams ==
When this division was introduced in 2000 (as London 4 South West) it contained the following teams:

- Barnes - relegated from London 3 South West (8th)
- Chobham - promoted from Surrey 1 (champions)
- Cobham - relegated from London 3 South West (7th)
- Cranleigh - relegated from London 3 South West (9th)
- Fawley - relegated from London 3 South West (14th)
- Old Alleynians - relegated from London 3 South West (15th)
- Purley John Fisher - relegated from London 3 South West (13th)
- Reeds Weybridge - relegated from London 3 South West (10th)
- Southampton - relegated from London 3 South West (11th)
- Tottonians - relegated from London 3 South West (12th)
- United Services Portsmouth - promoted from Hampshire 1 (champions)

== London 3 South West honours ==
=== London 4 South West (2000–2009) ===
Originally known as London 4 South West, this division was a tier 8 league with promotion up to London 3 South West and relegation down to either Hampshire 1 or Surrey 1.

London 4 South West
Season	No of teams	Champions	Runners–up	Relegated Teams
2000–01	11	Chobham	Cobham	Fawley, Old Alleynians, Southampton
2001–02	12	Richmond	Barnes	Farnborough, Warlingham, Reeds Weybridge
2002–03	10	Tottonians	London Irish Amateur	Trojans, Cranleigh
2003–04	10	Purley John Fisher	Farnham	United Services Portsmouth
2004–05	10	Old Reigatian	Guernsey	Romsey, Southampton, Old Emanuel
2005–06	10	Dorking	KCS Old Boys	Old Wellingtonians, Alton, Trojans
2006–07	10	Cobham	London Cornish	Old Amplefordians, Sandown & Shanklin, Old Caterhamians
2007–08	10	Warlingham	London South Africa	Farnham, Old Paulines, Petersfield
2008–09	12	Weybridge Vandals	Trojans	Petersfield
Green backgrounds are promotion places.

=== London 3 South West (2009–present) ===
League restructuring by the RFU ahead of the 2009–10 season saw London 4 South West renamed as London 3 South West. Remaining as a tier 8 league promotion was to London 2 South West (formerly London 3 South West), while relegation continued to either Hampshire 1 or Surrey 1.

London 3 South West
Season	No of teams	Champions	Runners–up	Relegated Teams
2009–10	12	Gosport & Fareham	Old Mid-Whitgiftian	Kingston, Old Paulines, Andover
2010–11	12	Teddington	Camberley	London South Africa, Old Wimbledonians, Fordingbridge
2011–12	12	Old Alleynians	KCS Old Boys	Alton, Andover, Old Freemens
2012–13	12	Winchester	Weybridge Vandals	Old Blues, Bognor, Old Paulines
2013–14	12	Farnham	KCS Old Boys	Old Wellingtonians, Camberley, Old Cranleighans
2014-15	12	London Exiles	Andover	Ellingham & Ringwood, Sandown & Shanklin
2015–16	12	Camberley	Old Tonbridgians	Purley John Fisher, New Milton & District
2016–17	12	Farnham	Eastleigh	Bognor, Millbrook, United Services Portsmouth
2017–18	12	Old Cranleighans	Old Emanuel	Basingstoke, New Milton & District, Weybridge
2018–19	12	Winchester	Battersea Ironsides	Old Whitgiftian, Petersfield, Teddington
2019–20	11 (Note: Only 11 teams this season after United Services Portsmouth dropped out of the league.)	Reeds Weybridge	Old Tiffinians	Effingham & Leatherhead, Gosport & Fareham
2020–21	12			
Green backgrounds are promotion places.

== Number of league titles ==
- Farnham (2)
- Winchester (2)
- Camberley (1)
- Chobham (1)
- Cobham (1)
- Dorking (1)
- Gosport & Fareham (1)
- London Exiles (1)
- Old Alleynians (1)
- Old Cranleighans (1)
- Old Reigatian (1)
- Purley John Fisher (1)
- Reeds Weybridge (1)
- Richmond (1)
- Teddington (1)
- Tottonians (1)
- Warlingham (1)
- Weybridge Vandals (1)

== See also ==
- English rugby union system
- Rugby union in England
