= London 2 South West =

English rugby union league

- Current season or competition: 2019–20 London 2 South West
- Sport: Rugby union
- Instituted: 1987; 39 years ago (as London 3 South West)
- Number of teams: 12
- Country: England
- Holders: Battersea Ironsides (1st title) (2019–20) (promoted to London 1 South)
- Most titles: Guildford (3 titles)
- Website: englandrugby.com

London 2 South West is an English level 7 Rugby Union League. When this division began in 1987 it was known as London 3 South West, changing to its current name ahead of the 2009–10 season. The division is made up of teams predominantly from south-west London, Surrey, and Hampshire. The 12 teams play home and away matches from September through to April. Each year all clubs in the division are also invited to take part in the RFU Intermediate Cup - a level 7 national competition.

Promoted teams move up to London 1 South with league champions going up automatically and the runners up playing a playoff against the runners up from London 2 South East while demoted teams usually drop down to London 3 South West.

== Teams for 2021–22 ==
The teams competing in 2021-22 achieved their places in the league based on performances in 2019-20, the 'previous season' column in the table below refers to that season not 2020-21.

Old Tonbridgians who finished 10th in 2019-20 were unable to fulfil their fixtures in and withdrew from the league in November 2021. Later the same month London Exiles, who finished 9th in 2019-20, also withdrew from the league having played only one match.

Team	Ground	Capacity	City/Area	Previous season
Chiswick	Dukes Meadows		Chiswick, London	Level transfer from London 2 NW (3rd)
Chobham	Fowlers Well		Chobham, Surrey	6th
Eastleigh	The Hub		Eastleigh, Hampshire	3rd
Hove	Hove Recreation Ground		Hove, East Sussex	Level transfer from London 2 SE (7th)
Old Reigatian	Geoffrey Knight Fields		Reigate, Surrey	5th
Old Tiffinians	Grist's Memorial Ground		Thames Ditton, Surrey	Promoted from London 3 SW (runners up)
Reeds Weybridge	Whiteley Village		Hersham, Surrey	Promoted from London 3 SW (champions)
Tottonians	Water Lane		Totton, Hampshire	7th
Twickenham	Parkfields		Hampton, London	8th
Winchester	North Walls Park		Winchester, Hampshire	4th

Locations of the 2021–22 London 2 South West teams in Greater London
Locations of the 2021–22 London 2 South West teams in Hampshire, Surrey & East Sussex

== Season 2020–21 ==
On 30 October the RFU announced that a decision had been taken to cancel Adult Competitive Leagues (National League 1 and below) for the 2020/21 season meaning London 2 South West was not contested.

== Teams for 2019–20 ==
Departing were KCS Old Boys promoted as champions to London 1 South whilst Gosport & Fareham (11th) and Effingham & Leatherhead (12th) were relegated to London 3 South West.

Team	Ground	Capacity	City/Area	Previous season
Battersea Ironsides	Burntwood Lane		Earlsfield, London	Promoted from London 3 SW (runners up)
Chobham	Fowlers Well		Chobham, Surrey	Relegated from London 1 South (13th)
Eastleigh	The Hub		Eastleigh, Hampshire	5th
Farnham	Wilkinson Way		Farnham, Surrey	Runners up (lost playoff)
London Exiles	Barn Elms		Barnes, London	10th
Old Cranleighans	Old Cranleighan Sports Club		Thames Ditton, Surrey	9th
Old Emanuel	Blagdons Sports Ground		New Malden, London	7th
Old Reigatian	Geoffrey Knight Fields		Reigate, Surrey	8th
Old Tonbridgians	Athletic Ground		Richmond, London	3rd
Tottonians	Water Lane		Totton, Hampshire	Relegated from London 1 South (12th)
Twickenham	Parkfields		Hampton, London	6th
Winchester	North Walls Park		Winchester, Hampshire	Promoted from London 3 SW (champions)

Locations of the 2019-20 London 2 South West teams in Greater London
Locations of the 2019–20 London 2 South West teams

== Teams for 2018–19 ==
Team	Ground	Capacity	City/Area	Previous season
Eastleigh	The Hub		Eastleigh, Hampshire	10th
Effingham & Leatherhead	King George V Playing Fields		Effingham, Surrey	8th
Farnham	Wilkinson Way		Farnham, Surrey	5th
Gosport & Fareham	Gosport Park		Gosport, Hampshire	7th
KCS Old Boys	Dornan Fields		New Malden, London	4th
London Exiles	Barn Elms		Barnes, London	6th
Old Alleynian	Dulwich Common		Dulwich, London	Level transfer from London 2 SE (8th)
Old Cranleighans	Old Cranleighan Sports Club		Thames Ditton, Surrey	Promoted from London 3 SW (champions)
Old Emanuel	Blagdons Sports Ground		New Malden, London	Promoted from London 3 SW (runners up)
Old Reigatian	Geoffrey Knight Fields		Reigate, Surrey	Runners up (lost playoff)
Old Tonbridgians	Athletic Ground		Richmond, London	9th
Twickenham	Parkfields		Hampton, London	3rd

Locations of the 2018-19 London 2 South West teams in Greater London
Locations of the 2018–19 London 2 South West clubs in Hampshire & Surrey

== Teams for 2017–18 ==
Team	Ground	Capacity	City/Area	Previous season
Andover	Foxcotte Lane		Andover, Hampshire	9th
Camberley	Watchetts Recreation Ground		Camberley, Surrey	2nd (lost playoff)
Eastleigh	The Hub		Eastleigh, Hampshire	Promoted from L3SW (runners up)
Effingham & Leatherhead	King George V Playing Fields		Effingham, Surrey	10th
Farnham	Wilkinson Way		Farnham, Surrey	Promoted from L3SW (champions)
Gosport & Fareham	Gosport Park		Gosport, Hampshire	Relegated from London 1 South (14th)
KCS Old Boys	Dornan Fields		New Malden, London	8th
London Exiles	Barn Elms		Barnes, London	6th
Old Reigatian	Geoffrey Knight Fields		Reigate, Surrey	4th
Old Tonbridgians	Athletic Ground		Richmond, London	3rd
Twickenham	Parkfields		Hampton, London	5th
Winchester	North Walls Park		Winchester, Hampshire	7th

Locations of the 2017-18 London 2 South West teams in Greater London
Locations of the 2017–18 London 2 South West teams

== Teams for 2016-17 ==
- Andover
- Camberley (promoted from London 3 South West)
- Effingham & Leatherhead
- KCS Old Boys
- London Cornish
- London Exiles
- Old Reigatian
- Old Tonbridgians (promoted from London 3 South West)
- Portsmouth
- Twickenham (relegated from London 1 South)
- Warlingham
- Winchester

== Teams for 2015-16 ==
- Andover (promoted from London 3 South West)
- Basingstoke (relegated from London 1 South)
- Cobham (relegated from London 1 South)
- Effingham & Leatherhead
- KCS Old Boys
- London Cornish
- London Exiles (promoted from London 3 South West)
- Old Reigatian
- Portsmouth
- Warlingham
- Weybridge Vandals
- Winchester

== Teams for 2014-15 ==
- Effingham & Leatherhead
- Farnham (promoted from London 3 South West)
- KCS Old Boys(promoted from London 3 South West)
- London Cornish
- Old Alleynian
- Old Reigatian
- Portsmouth
- Tadley
- Tottonians
- Warlingham
- Weybridge Vandals
- Winchester

== Teams for 2013-14 ==
- Effingham & Leatherhead
- Gosport & Fareham
- Guildford
- London Cornish
- Old Alleynian
- Old Reigatian
- Portsmouth
- Teddington
- Tottonians
- Trojans (relegated from London 1 South)
- Weybridge Vandals
- Winchester (promoted from London 3 South West)

== Teams for 2012-13 ==
1 Chobham 87

2 Sutton & Epsom 85

3 Guildford 80

4 Tottonians 71

5 Effingham & Leatherhead 59

6 Old Reigatian 50

7 Portsmouth 50

8 London Cornish 38

9 Teddington 37

10 Old Alleynian 35

11 KCS Old Boys 35

12 Camberley 15

== Teams for 2011-12 ==
1 Gosport & Fareham 97

2 Wimbledon 88

3 Guildford 67

4 London Cornish 59

5 Tottonians 55

6 Old Reigatian 54

7 Camberley 48

8 Effingham & Leatherhead 45

9 Chobham 43

10 Teddington 39

11 Twickenham 38

12 Bognor 15

== Teams for 2010-11 ==
- Bognor
- Effingham and Leatherhead
- Guernsey
- Guildford
- Gosport & Fareham
- KCS Old Boys
- London Cornish
- Old Reigatians
- Tottonians
- Trojans
- Twickenham
- Weybridge Vandals

== Teams for 2009-10 ==
- Bognor
- Effingham and Leatherhead
- Guernsey
- Guildford
- London Cornish
- London Irish Amateur
- London South Africa
- Tottonians
- Trojans
- Twickenham
- Weybridge Vandals
- Winchester

== Original teams ==
When league rugby began in 1987 this division (known as London 3 South West) contained the following teams:

- Alton
- Eastleigh
- Guy's Hospital
- Jersey
- Old Emanuel
- Old Whitgiftian
- Old Walcountians
- Purley (Note: Purley would merge with John Fisher Old Boys RFC on 1997 to form Purley John Fisher RFC.)
- Trojans
- Warlingham
- Winchester

== London 2 South West Honours ==
=== London 3 South West (1987–1993) ===
Originally known as London 3 South West, this division was a tier 7 league with promotion up to London 2 South and relegation down to either Hampshire 1 or Surrey 1.

London 3 South West Honours
Season	No of teams	Champions	Runners–up	Relegated Teams
1987–88	11	Purley	Alton	Trojans, Warlingham
1988–89	11	Alton	Old Guildfordians	Jersey, Winchester
1989–90	11	Dorking	Purley	Gosport
1990–91	11	Old Blues	Old Reigatian	Old Whitgiftian
1991–92	11	KCS Old Boys	Old Reigatian	No relegation (Note: As the league was due to increase from 11 to 13 teams for the follow season, there was no relegation.)
1992–93	13	Old Wimbledonians	Warlingham	Jersey, Millbrook
Green backgrounds are promotion places.

=== London 3 South West (1993–1996) ===
At the end of the 1992–93 season, the top six teams from London 1 and the top six from South West 1 were combined to create National 5 South. This meant that London 3 South West dropped from a tier 7 league to a tier 8 league for the years that National 5 South was active. Promotion continued to London 2 South, and relegation to either Hampshire 1 or Surrey 1.

London 3 South West Honours
Season	No of teams	Champions	Runners–up	Relegated Teams
1993–94	13	Portsmouth	Old Guildfordians	United Services Portsmouth, Winchester
1994–95	12	Wimbledon	Alton	Eastleigh, Southampton
1995–96	13	Old Guildfordians	Portsmouth	Cranleigh, Old Alleynians
Green backgrounds are promotion places.

=== London 3 South West (1996–2000) ===
The cancellation of National 5 South at the end of the 1995–96 season meant that London 3 South West reverted to being a tier 7 league. Promotion continued to London 2 South and relegation to either Hampshire 1 or Surrey 1.

London 3 South West Honours
Season	No of teams	Champions	Runners–up	Relegated Teams
1996–97	13	Winchester	Warlingham (Note: 3rd place Portsmouth also promoted.)	No relegation (Note: No relegation as league was set to expand from 13 to 17 teams for the following season.)
1997–98	17	Alton	Jersey	Guy's Hospital, Old Walcountians, Esso
1998–99	16	Effingham & Leatherhead	Jersey	Streatham-Croydon, Farnborough
1999–00	17	Gosport & Fareham	Jersey	Multiple teams (Note: The introduction of London 4 South West for the following season meant that eleven clubs would be relegated. Old Reigatian and Old Whitgiftian dropped two levels to Surrey 1, while Old Alleynian, Fawley, Purley John Fisher, Tottonians, Southampton, Reeds Weybridge, Cranleigh, Barnes and Cobham went into the new London 4 South West division.)
Green backgrounds are promotion places.

=== London 3 South West (2000–2009) ===
London 3 South West continued to be a tier 7 league with promotion up to London 2 South. However, the introduction of London 4 South West ahead of the 2000–01 season meant that clubs were relegated into this new division instead of into Hampshire 1 or Surrey 1.

London 3 South West Honours
Season	No of teams	Champions	Runners–up	Relegated Teams
2000–01	10	Portsmouth	Gosport & Fareham	Old Emanuel
2001–02	10	Andover	Cobham	Weybridge Vandals
2002–03	10	Richmond	Barnes	Dorking
2003–04	10	Guildford	Old Wimbledonians	Old Blues
2004–05	12	Jersey	Effingham & Leatherhead	Alton
2005–06	12	Andover	London Irish Amateur	Weybridge Vandals, Farnham
2006–07	12	Chobham	Dorking	Gosport & Fareham, Camberley, Old Mid-Whitgiftian
2007–08	12	Cobham	Purley John Fisher	Old Wimbledonians, Andover
2008–09	12	Chichester	Wimbledon (Note: Both Wimbledon and the runners up from London 2 East, Aylesford Bulls, were promoted to London 2 South this year.)	No relegation
Green backgrounds are promotion places.

=== London 2 South West (2009–present) ===
Nationwide league restructuring by the RFU ahead of the 2009–10 season saw London 3 South West renamed as London 2 South West. It remained at level 7 with promotion to London 1 South (formerly London 2 South) and relegation to London 3 South West (formerly London 4 South West).

London 2 South West Honours
Season	No of teams	Champions	Runners–up	Relegated Teams
2009–10	12	London Irish Amateur	Guernsey	Winchester, London South Africa
2010–11	12	Guernsey	Trojans	KCS Old Boys, Weybridge Vandals
2011–12	12	Gosport & Fareham	Wimbledon	Bognor, Twickenham
2012–13	12	Chobham	Sutton & Epsom	Camberley, KCS Old Boys
2013–14	12	Guildford	Gosport & Fareham	Teddington, Trojans
2014–15	12	Tottonians	London Cornish	Tadley, Farnham
2015–16	12	Cobham	London Cornish	Basingstoke, Weybridge Vandals
2016–17	12	London Cornish	Camberley	Warlingham, Portsmouth
2017–18	12	Camberley	Old Reigatian	Andover, Winchester
2018–19	12	KCS Old Boys	Farnham	Effingham & Leatherhead, Gosport & Fareham
2019–20	12	Battersea Ironsides	Farnham	Old Cranleighans, Old Emanuel
2020–21	12			
Green backgrounds are promotion places.

== Promotion play-offs ==
Since the 2000–01 season there has been a play-off between the runners-up of London 2 South East and London 2 South West for the third and final promotion place to London 1 South. The team with the superior league record has home advantage in the tie. At the end of the 2019–20 season the London 2 South West teams have been the most successful with ten wins to the London 2 South East teams nine, and the home team has won promotion on eleven occasions compared to the away teams eight.

Due to the COVID-19 pandemic, the season ended in March with four game rounds remaining. On 4 April 2020 the RFU announced that a "best playing record formula" would be used to determine promotion and relegation and there would be no play-offs. Consequently, Farnham RFC (84.33 adjusted points tally) were promoted to London 1 South in favour of London 2 South East runners up Old Colfeians (83.11 adjusted points tally).

London 2 (south-east v south-west) promotion play-off results
Season	Home team	Score	Away team	Venue	Attendance
2000-01	Gosport & Fareham (SW)	27-14	Sidcup (SE)	Gosport Park, Gosport, Hampshire	
2001-02	Sidcup (SE)	21-23	Cobham (SW)	Crescent Farm, Sidcup, Kent	
2002-03	Barnes (SW)	41-3	Dartfordians (SE)	Barn Elms, Barnes, London	
2003-04	Old Wimbledonians (SW)	3-24	Lewes (SE)	Somerset Avenue, Wimbledon, London	
2004-05	Sevenoaks (SE)	33-12	Effingham & Leatherhead (SW)	Knole Paddock, Sevenoaks, Kent	
2005-06	Purley John Fisher (SE)	15-23	London Irish Wild Geese (SW)	Parsons Pightle, Old Coulsdon, Greater London	
2006-07	Dorking (SW)	21-6	Purley John Fisher (SE)	The Big Field, Brockham, Surrey	
2007-08	Purley John Fisher (SW)	19-25	Dover (SE)	Parsons Pightle, Old Coulsdon, Greater London	400
2008-09	Aylesford Bulls (SE) (Note: Despite losing the playoff, Aylesford Bulls would join Wimbledon in London 1 South the following season.)	20-36	Wimbledon (SW)	Hall Road, Aylesford, Kent	
2009-10	Hove (SE)	17-14	Guernsey (SW)	Hove Recreation Ground, Hove, East Sussex	
2010-11	Aylesford Bulls (SE)	14-28	Trojans (SW)	Hall Road, Aylesford, Kent	
2011-12	Wimbledon (SW)	18-6	Charlton Park (SE)	Barham Road, Wimbledon, London	
2012-13	Charlton Park (SE)	12-15	Sutton & Epsom (SW)	Broad Walk, Kidbrooke, Greater London	
2013-14	Gosport & Fareham (SW)	14-10	Maidstone (SE)	Gosport Park, Gosport, Hampshire	
2014-15	Medway (SE)	29-12	London Cornish (SW)	Priestfields, Rochester, Kent	600
2015-16	Sevenoaks (SE)	37-31	London Cornish (SW)	Knole Paddock, Sevenoaks, Kent	234
2016-17	Camberley (SW)	17-20	Old Colfeians (SE)	Watchetts Recreation Ground, Camberley, Surrey	
2017-18	Hove (SE)	17-16	Old Reigatian (SW)	Hove Recreation Ground, Hove, East Sussex	
2018-19	Horsham (SE)	44-17	Farnham (SW)	Coolhurst Ground, Horsham, West Sussex	600
2019–20	Cancelled due to COVID-19 pandemic in the United Kingdom. Best ranked runner up - Farnham (SW) - promoted instead.				
2020–21					
Green background is the promoted team. SE = London 2 South East (formerly London 3 South East) and SW = London 2 South West (formerly London 3 South West)

== Number of league titles ==
- Guildford (3) (Note: Includes 1 title won by founder club Old Guildfordians.)
- Alton (2)
- Andover (2)
- Chobham (2)
- Cobham (2)
- Gosport & Fareham (2)
- KCS Old Boys (2)
- Portsmouth (2)
- Battersea Ironsides (1)
- Camberley (1)
- Chichester (1)
- Dorking (1)
- Effingham & Leatherhead (1)
- Guernsey (1)
- Jersey (1)
- London Cornish (1)
- London Irish Amateur (1)
- Old Blues (1)
- Old Wimbledonians (1)
- Purley (1)
- Richmond (1)
- Tottonians (1)
- Wimbledon (1)
- Winchester (1)

== See also ==
- London & SE Division RFU
- Hampshire RFU
- Surrey RFU
- English rugby union system
- Rugby union in England
