= Surrey Bowl =

English rugby union competition

- Sport: Rugby Union
- Instituted: 2006; 20 years ago
- Number of teams: 9
- Country: England
- Holders: Old Rutlishians (2nd title) (2017-18)
- Most titles: Old Glynonians (2 titles)
- Website: Surrey RFU

The Surrey Bowl is an annual rugby union knock-out club competition organized by the Surrey Rugby Football Union. It was introduced in 2006 and the inaugural winners were Merton. It is the fourth most important rugby union cup competition in Surrey, behind the Surrey Cup, Surrey Trophy and Surrey Shield.

The Surrey Bowl is currently open to club sides based in Surrey and parts of south London, that play in tier 11 (Surrey 3) and tier 12 (Surrey 4) of the English rugby union league system. The format is a knockout cup with a first round, second round, semi-finals and final to be held at Molesey Road (Esher's home ground) in May on the same date and same venue as the other Surrey finals.

== Surrey Bowl winners ==
Surrey Bowl Finals
Season	Winner	Score	Runners–up	Venue
2006-07	Merton		Raynes Park	Imber Court Sports Ground, East Molesey
2007-08	Old Glynonians		Merton	Imber Court Sports Ground, East Molesey
2008-09	Old Blues	22-0	Streatham-Croydon	Imber Court Sports Ground, East Molesey
2009-10	Old Glynonians	5-0	Mitcham	Imber Court Sports Ground, East Molesey
2010-11	Economicals	20-17	Old Rutlishians	Imber Court Sports Ground, East Molesey
2011-12	Streatham-Croydon	10-8	Economicals	Imber Court Sports Ground, East Molesey
2012-13	Old Glynonians	15-8	Merton	Molesey Road, Hersham
2013-14	Guildfordians	27-24	Old Georgians	Molesey Road, Hersham
2014-15	Merton	12-3	Reigate	Molesey Road, Hersham
2015-16	Old Haileyburian	24-10	Bec Old Boys	Molesey Road, Hersham
2016-17	Old Rutlishians	32-3	Old Haileyburian	Molesey Road, Hersham
2017-18	Old Rutlishians	41-17	Merton	Molesey Road, Hersham
2018-19				

== Number of wins ==
- Old Glynonians (3)
- Merton (2)
- Old Rutlishians (2)
- Economicals (1)
- Guildfordians (1)
- Old Blues (1)
- Old Haileyburian (1)
- Streatham-Croydon (1)

== See also ==
- Surrey RFU
- Surrey Cup
- Surrey Trophy
- Surrey Shield
