= 1937–38 Rugby Union County Championship =

English rugby union competition

1937–38 County Championship
- Countries: England
- Champions: Lancashire (3rd title)
- Runners-up: Surrey

The 1937–38 Rugby Union County Championship was the 45th edition of England's premier rugby union club competition at the time.

Lancashire won the competition for the third time after defeating Surrey in the final.

== Final ==
12 March 1938

Lancashire	24–12	Surrey
Try: Fry, Guest, Leyland, Lumby, Simpson; Con: Heaton (3)		Try: Maddocks, Hamilton-Hill; Drop: Harrison, Couchman

St Anthonys Road, Blundellsands
Referee: H R Newton

R Horne	Furness
A B Laithwaite	Waterloo
Roy Leyland	Army
Jack Heaton	Waterloo
Dickie Guest	Liverpool University
W Howarth	Fylde
J L Lumby	Waterloo
Henry Fry	Liverpool
R T Simpson	Metrovick
A N Clint	Waterloo
E W Crewe	Broughton Park
Fred Huskisson	Old Merchant Taylors
W H Leather	Harlequins
Henry Toft	Waterloo FC
A J Brock	Waterloo

C W Suter	Old Cranleighans
W G S Johnston	Richmond
K S Robinson	Harlequins
J Harrison	Army & Rosslyn Park
C E J Lambert	Old Cranleighans
G H Davies	London Welsh
J S Maddocks	London Welsh
Edward Hamilton-Hill	Harlequins
L H Garrett	Rosslyn Park
A M Reis	Metropolitan Police
G B Horsburgh	London Scottish
Stanley Couchman	Old Cranleighans
J G Jenkins	Harlequins
P W Seligman	Rosslyn Park
W M Frost	K.C.S Old Boys

== See also ==
- English rugby union system
- Rugby union in England
