= Alex Corbisiero =

English rugby union player (born 1988)

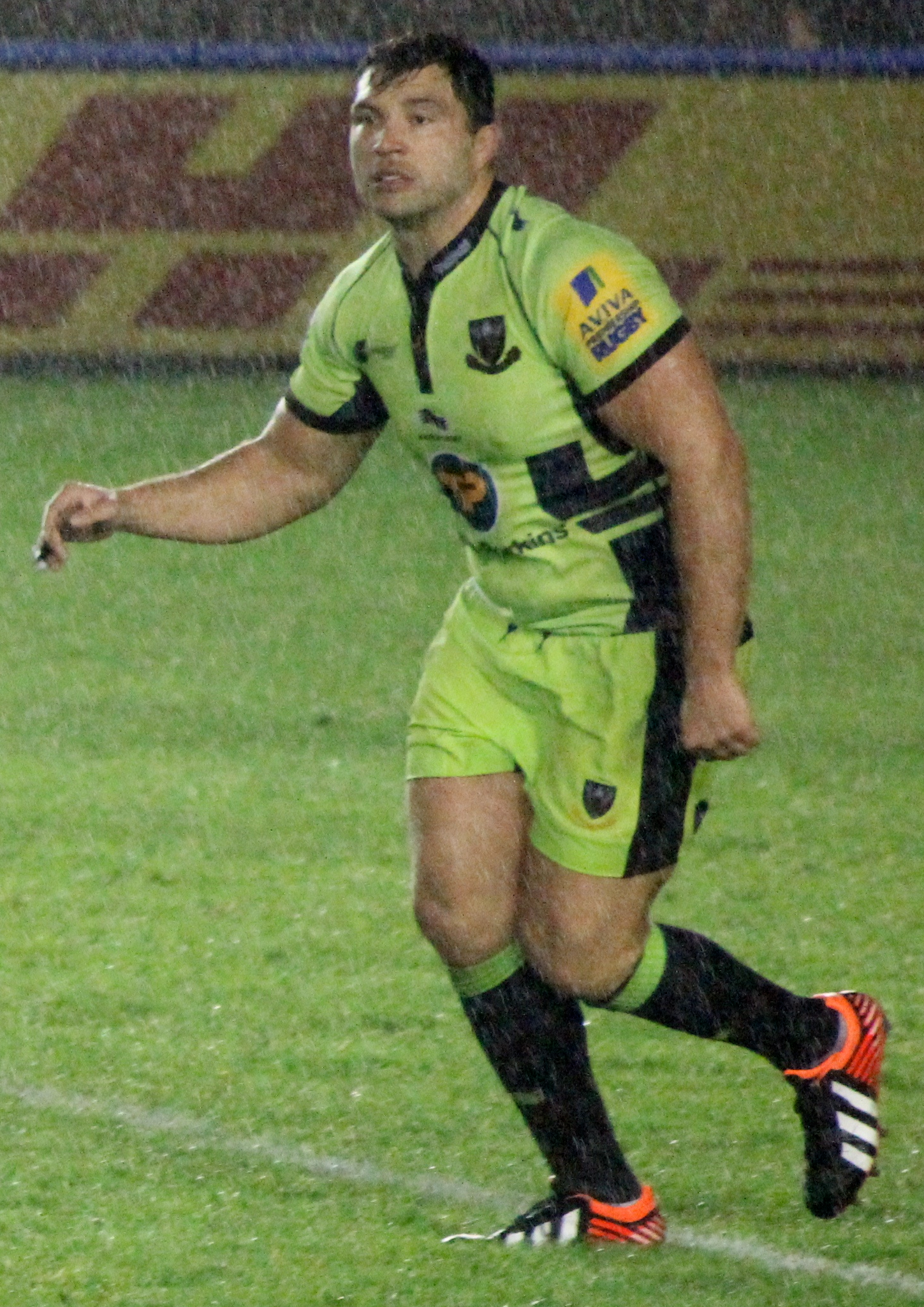
- Corbisiero playing for Northampton Saints in 2013
- Born: Alexander Richard Corbisiero; 30 August 1988 (age 38) New York City, United States
- Height: 1.86 m (6 ft 1 in)
- Weight: 124 kg (273 lb)
- School: Hall School Wimbledon Reed's School
- University: London School of Economics; Birkbeck, University of London

Rugby union career
- Position: Loosehead prop
Youth career
- KCS Old Boys RFC
- –: London Scottish F.C.
- –: Cobham RFC
Senior career
Years	Team	Apps	(Points)
2008–2013	London Irish	75	(30)
2013–2016	Northampton Saints	28	(40)
- Correct as of 17 September 2016
International career
Years	Team	Apps	(Points)
2008-2010	England U20	35	(10)
2010-2011	England Saxons	6	(5)
2011–2016	England	31	(10)
2013	British & Irish Lions	2	(5)
- Correct as of 9 November 2013

Alexander Richard Corbisiero (born 30 August 1988) is a retired rugby union player who played as a loosehead prop. Born in the United States, he represented the England national team when playing.

== Early life and education ==
Born 30 August 1988, Alexander Corbisiero is the great-grandson of Riccardo Corbisiero, who emigrated from Naples to the United States in 1923 and established Riccardo's – a restaurant known for its continental cuisine – in Astoria, Queens in the early 1950s. Alex was born in New York City to the restaurateur's grandson and his English wife Lorraine Collins. He emigrated to England with his parents shortly before his fifth birthday.

Corbisiero was first educated at Hall School Wimbledon, then Reed's School, finally graduating from ACS Cobham International School in 2006, where he was also captain of the school's Cougars rugby team. He studied at the London School of Economics. He then studied for a BA in history at Birkbeck, University of London beginning in 2009.

== Club career ==
He was introduced to rugby at KCS Old Boys RFC as a mini at the age of 5, where he stayed for seven years before going on to represent London Scottish and then Cobham before joining the London Irish Academy in August 2005, making his professional club debut against London Wasps in the 2008 London Double Header.

Corbisiero was a used replacement in the final of the 2008–09 Guinness Premiership.

On 16 January 2013, Corbisiero left London Irish to sign for Northampton Saints for the 2013/14 season. In 2014 Corbisiero played as a replacement as Northampton beat Saracens to win the Premiership final.

Corbisiero left Northampton Saints in January 2016 due to an injury plagued time at the club.

== International career ==
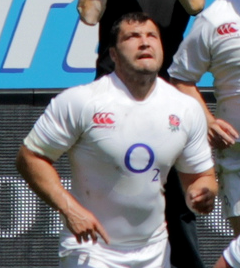
Corbisiero playing for England in 2013

Corbisiero represented England at Under-18, Under-19 and Under-20 level. He competed for England at the 2007 Under 19 Rugby World Championship.

In 2008, Corbisiero was a member of the England under-20 team that won the grand slam and reached the final of the 2008 IRB Junior World Championship.

Corbisiero was eligible to represent either England, Italy, Ireland or the US at senior level, but having been raised and educated and having played all his rugby in England, he cast his lot with England when he made his debut for the England Saxons against Russia at the 2010 Churchill Cup.

Corbisiero made his senior debut for England against Italy on 12 February 2011 after Andrew Sheridan was ruled out of the match with a back injury. He went on to feature in four of England's five tests as they won the Six Nations Championship, with injury ruling Sheridan out for the rest of the tournament. Corbisiero represented England at the Rugby World Cup 2011. He was also a regular in the team during 2012, both in the Six Nations championship (four victories and one defeat) and in the summer and autumn internationals (including two losses to South Africa and a victory over New Zealand.)

Injury ruled him out of the 2013 Six Nations championship, and seemed to have ruled him out of initial selection for the British & Irish Lions squad for the 2013 British & Irish Lions tour to Australia. However, on 5 June, he replaced Irish prop Cian Healy after Healy was injured during the second tour match against Western Force. Corbisiero started the first Test against Australia on Saturday 22 June. Corbisiero scored the Lions' first try in their victorious third test against Australia which clinched the series.

Further injuries to shoulder, neck and back dogged his career, and he played only two more international matches, against Argentina in November 2013, then one more appearance two years later, coming off the subs bench against France in August 2015, in a warm-up match for the 2015 World Cup. Recurrent injuries prevented him being part of the World Cup squad.

== Sabbatical and retirement ==
Corbisero experienced a succession of injuries in 2013-15, particularly of a knee. In December 2015 (at age 27) Corbisiero announced he would taking a year out from Rugby, saying he was 'mentally drained', but that he envisaged returning to play.

In early 2018, while guest hosting on the Rugby Pod podcast, Corbisiero acknowledged it was unlikely he would be returning to professional rugby. This decision was affected by the attractiveness of continuing his media work with NBC, and his concern about possible injury damage from an extended playing career.

== Media career and other interests ==
Corbisiero was an analyst for NBC Sports coverage of the Aviva Premiership along with Leigh Diffey.

Corbisiero also has interests in a student placement agency and in rugby coaching.

== Coaching career ==
On 27 October 2020, Corbisiero was appointed Scrum Coach for the Los Angeles Giltinis for the 2021 Major League Rugby season.

== Health issues ==
Corbisero was diagnosed with testicular cancer in November 2019 and is receiving further treatment after the cancer spread to his lymph nodes.

As of October 2022, Corbisiero announced on his Instagram profile that he had been cancer free for 2 years.
