= 2015 County Championship Plate =

English rugby union tournament

- Countries: England
- Date: 15 May 2016 - 31 May 2015
- Champions: Surrey (1st title)
- Runners-up: Eastern Counties
- Attendance: 2,310 (average 247 per match)
- Highest attendance: 640 Devon v North Midlands (16 May 2015)
- Lowest attendance: 112 North Midlands v Surrey (9 May 2015)
- Top point scorer: (England) Matt Noble; Surrey 39
- Top try scorer: (England) Ryan Jeffrey; Surrey 6

The 2015 County Championship Plate, also known as Bill Beaumont Cup Division 2, was the 14th version of the annual English rugby union, County Championship organized by the RFU for the tier 2 English counties. Each county drew its players from rugby union clubs from the third tier and below of the English rugby union league system (typically National League 1, National League 2 South or National League 2 North). The counties were divided into two regional pools (north/south) with three teams in the north division and four in the south, with the winners of each pool meeting in the final held at Twickenham Stadium. New counties to the division included North Midlands and Northumberland who were demoted from the 2014 Bill Beaumont Cup while Surrey came up from the 2014 County Championship Shield having beaten Leicestershire the previous year in the Shield final having won the competition three years in a row.

At the end of the group stage the northern division was won by Eastern Counties who edged out Northumberland while the southern division was won with ease by Surrey who steamrolled through their group. The counties went through to the final and as group winners will be promoted to the top tier with Surrey making it two promotions in a row. Surrey then defeated Eastern Counties in the early kickoff at Twickenham Stadium, winning 17 – 3, in what was their fourth consecutive Twickenham appearance. In terms of individual player performances the top try scorer was Surrey's Ryan Jeffrey who got six tries in the tournament – all coming in the one game against North Midlands.

== Competition format ==
The competition format was two regional group stages divided into north and south, with each team playing each other once. In the north group each team played one home game (there were three teams in the group) while in the south group, two teams in the group had two home games, while the other two had just the one. The top side in each group went through to the final held at Twickenham Stadium on 31 May 2015, with both teams also being promoted to the top tier for the following season. Typically there was no relegation although teams have dropped out of the division in the past.

== Participating counties and ground locations ==
Locations of the 2015 County Championship Plate county teams

County	Stadium(s)	Capacity	City/Area
East Midlands	Putnoe Woods	500	Bedford, Bedfordshire
Eastern Counties	University Football Ground	1,500	Cambridge, Cambridgeshire
Devon	Astley Park; Showground	1,800; 1,120 (120 seats)	Brixham, Devon; Okehampton, Devon
North Midlands	Stourton Park	3,500 (499 seats)	Stourbridge, West Midlands
Northumberland	Kingston Park	10,200	Newcastle upon Tyne, Tyne and Wear
Somerset	Hyde Park	2,000 (198 seats)	Taunton, Somerset
Surrey	Hazelwood	2,000	Sunbury-on-Thames, Surrey

== Group stage ==
=== Division 2 North ===
2015 County Championship Plate Division 2 North Table
	County	Played	Won	Drawn	Lost	Points For	Points Against	Points Difference	Try Bonus	Losing Bonus	Points
1	Eastern Counties (P)	2	2	0	0	64	37	27	1	0	9
2	Northumberland	2	1	0	1	55	36	19	1	1	6
3	East Midlands	2	0	0	2	28	74	−46	0	0	0
If teams are level at any stage, tiebreakers are applied in the following order: 1. Number of matches won 2. Difference between points for and against 3. Total number of points for 4. Aggregate number of points scored in matches between tied teams 5. Number of matches won excluding the first match, then the second and so on until the tie is settled
Green background means the county qualified for the final and is also promoted to the Division 1 North of the Bill Beaumont Cup for the following season. Updated: 13 May 2015; Source: "County Championships". englandrugby.com.

==== Round 1 ====
9 May 2015
15:00

East Midlands	10–36	Northumberland (BP)
	Report

Putnoe Woods, Bedford
Attendance: 152
Referee: Robbie Bourke

==== Round 2 ====
16 May 2015
15:00

(BP) Eastern Counties	38–18	East Midlands
	Report

University Football Ground, Cambridge
Attendance: 250
Referee: Veryan Boscawen

==== Round 3 ====
23 May 2015
15:00

(BP) Northumberland	19–26	Eastern Counties
	Report

Kingston Park, Newcastle upon Tyne
Attendance: 258
Referee: Mick Harris

=== Division 2 South ===
2015 County Championship Plate Division 2 South Table
	County	Played	Won	Drawn	Lost	Points For	Points Against	Points Difference	Try Bonus	Losing Bonus	Points
1	Surrey (P)	3	3	0	0	152	81	71	3	0	15
2	North Midlands	3	2	0	1	99	103	−4	2	0	10
3	Somerset	3	1	0	2	86	138	−52	2	0	6
4	Devon	3	0	0	3	86	101	−13	2	2	4
If teams are level at any stage, tiebreakers are applied in the following order: 1. Number of matches won 2. Difference between points for and against 3. Total number of points for 4. Aggregate number of points scored in matches between tied teams 5. Number of matches won excluding the first match, then the second and so on until the tie is settled
Green background means the county qualified for the final and is also promoted to the Division 1 South of the Bill Beaumont Cup for the following season. Updated: 13 May 2015; Source: "County Championships". englandrugby.com.

==== Round 1 ====
9 May 2015
15:00

North Midlands	17–60	Surrey (BP)
	Report

Stourton Park, Stourbridge
Attendance: 112
Referee: Chris Bennett

9 May 2015
15:00

(BP) Somerset	34–31	Devon (2BP)
	Report

Hyde Park, Taunton
Attendance: 203
Referee: Phil Davies

==== Round 2 ====
16 May 2015
15:00

(BP) Devon	24–34	North Midlands (BP)
	Report

Astley Park, Brixham
Attendance: 640
Referee: Benedict Wiles

16 May 2015
15:00

(BP) Surrey	59–33	Somerset (BP)
	Report

Hazelwood, Sunbury-on-Thames
Attendance: 278
Referee: John Scully

==== Round 3 ====
23 May 2015
15:00

(BP) Devon	31–33	Surrey (BP)
	Report

Showground, Okehampton
Attendance: 242
Referee: Adam Leal

23 May 2015
15:00

(BP) North Midlands	48–19	Somerset

Stourton Park, Stourbridge
Attendance: 175
Referee: Alex Thomas

== Final ==
31 May 2015
10:00

Surrey	17–3	Eastern Counties
	Report

Twickenham Stadium, London

== Total season attendances ==
- Does not include final at Twickenham which was a neutral venue and involved teams from all three county divisions on the same day

County	Home Games	Total	Average	Highest	Lowest	% Capacity
Devon	2	882	441	640	242	29%
Eastern Counties	1	250	250	250	250	17%
East Midlands	1	152	152	152	152	30%
North Midlands	2	287	144	175	112	4%
Northumberland	1	258	258	258	258	3%
Somerset	1	203	203	203	203	10%
Surrey	1	278	278	278	278	14%

== Individual statistics ==
- Note if players are tied on tries or points the player with the lowest number of appearances comes first. Also note that points scorers includes tries as well as conversions, penalties and drop goals. Appearance figures also include coming on as substitutes (unused substitutes not included). Statistics also include final.

=== Top points scorers ===
Rank	Player	County	Club Side	Appearances	Points
1	(England) Matt Noble	Surrey	Dorking	4	39
2	(England) Joe Simmons	Devon	Teignmouth	3	36
3	(England) Ryan Jeffrey	Surrey	Dorking	1	30
4	(England) Joe Hall	Somerset	Cleve	3	26
5	(England) James Stokes	Eastern Counties	Cambridge	3	22

=== Top try scorers ===
Rank	Player	County	Club Side	Appearances	Tries
1	(England) Ryan Jeffrey	Surrey	Dorking	1	6
2	(England) Will Crow	Surrey	Dorking	3	3
2	(England) Tom Goodman	Devon	Brixham	3	3
2	(England) Sam Montieri	North Midlands	Bromsgrove	3	3
5	(England) Mike Terelak	Surrey	Dorking	4	3

== See also ==
- English rugby union system
- Rugby union in England
