= Fraser Gore =

Scotland international rugby union player

- Born: Arthur Charles Fraser Gore; 10 July 1857 Ardersier, Scotland
- Died: 23 September 1914 (aged 57) Maitland, Cape Town, South Africa

Rugby union career
- Position: Forward
Amateur team(s)
| Years | Team | Apps | (Points) |
- Wasps
| – | London Scottish | | |
Provincial / State sides
| Years | Team | Apps | (Points) |
| 1880 | Surrey | | |
International career
| Years | Team | Apps | (Points) |
| 1882 | Scotland | 1 | (0) |

Fraser Gore (10 July 1857 – 23 September 1914) was a Scotland international rugby union player. His regular playing position was Forward.

== Rugby Union career ==
=== Amateur career ===
Gore played for the Wasps in 1877.

Gore then played rugby union for London Scottish. He was part of the 1883-84 side that was unbeaten by any London club.

=== Provincial career ===
Gore played for Surrey on Monday 6 December 1880, in a match against Kent. He played again for Surrey in 1882 against Middlesex.

=== International career ===
Gore was capped just the once by Scotland, against Ireland in 1882.

== Military career ==
Gore began a private in the 15th battalion of Middlesex Regiment in 1878.

Gore was a volunteer in the Auxiliary Forces, becoming a Lieutenant in the 7th battalion of Middlesex Regiment.

In 1889, Gore was in the London Scottish Rifles.

== Other sports ==
=== Rowing ===
Gore was named in the North London Rowing Club in 1878 and in the Thames Rowing Club in 1879. He rowed in the Thames Challenge Cup.

=== Wrestling ===
Gore won a wrestling event at the Scottish Athletic Gathering - a Highland Games event in London - at Stamford Bridge in 1888.

== Family ==
Gore's parents were James Arthur Gore (1827-1901) and Catherine Louise Bazalgette (1832-1921). They married in 1854, and Fraser was the eldest of their 10 children.

Fraser married Mary Ohlsson (1875-1961) in Rondesbosch, South Africa in 1897.

Gore died on 23 September 1914 and was buried in Maitland Cemetery.
