= Mark Tampin =

English rugby union player

- Born: Mark William Tampin; 20 January 1992 (age 34) Kingston upon Thames, England
- Height: 1.85 m (6 ft 1 in)
- Weight: 122 kg (19 st 3 lb)
- School: Epsom College

Rugby union career
- Position: Tighthead Prop
- Current team: Newcastle Falcons
Senior career
Years	Team	Apps	(Points)
2010-2013	Leeds Tykes	10	(0)
2013-2016	Rotherham Titans	85	(0)
2016-2017	Jersey Reds	15	(0)
2017-2019	Ealing Trailfinders	38	(0)
2019-2024	Newcastle Falcons	81	(0)
- Correct as of 11 May 2022

Mark Tampin (born 20 January 1992) is a retired English rugby union prop forward who most recently played for Newcastle Falcons in the Premiership Rugby.

Mark started his career with Leeds Carnegie in 2010 remaining there for three years, during which time he featured as a dual-registered player in the National Leagues with Wharfedale and Harrogate. In 2013 he signed for Rotherham playing in the RFU championship amassing more than 80 appearances.

A switch to Jersey followed in 2016 then another to Ealing ahead of the 2017-18 season.

He remained with Ealing for two years before agreeing a move to Newcastle in Summer 2019 where he was part of the squad which won promotion from the Championship in 2019-20 season as Falcons ended the campaign undefeated with 15 victories, the league having been curtailed and ultimately cancelled on 20 March 2020 due to the COVID-19 pandemic in the United Kingdom.

His Premiership Rugby debut came on 21 November 2020 when Mark came off the bench for Logovi'i Mulipola as Falcons defeated Bath Rugby 12-19 in the opening round of the Premiership season. On 31 May 2021 it was announced by Newcastle that he had renewed terms for a further two years. His 50th appearance for the club came in April 2022 in the EPCR Challenge Cup against Zebre. In January 2023 the club confirmed he had agreed a new contract until Summer 2025 however he decided to step away from the game to pursue a career outside rugby in Summer 2024.

Mark was invited to the initial training senior England squad for the Autumn internationals in 2022 however did not make an appearance.

Mark's grandfather was David 'Wrecker' Brooks (1924-2002) who played for Harlequins and was President of Surrey (1971–73) and later President of the RFU (1981-1982) although he is perhaps best remembered as the Tour Manager of the British Lions 1968 tour to South Africa.
