= London South Africa RFC =

Defunct rugby union club in England

London South Africa
- Full name: London South Africa Rugby Football Club
- Union: Rugby Football Union
- Branch: Surrey Rugby Football Union
- Nickname: The Boks
- Emblem: Springbok
- Founded: 2005
- Disbanded: 2014
- Location: Esher, Surrey

London South Africa Rugby Football Club was an English rugby union club based initially in Wimbledon, London before moving to Surrey. They were founded in 2005 as a rugby club for South African expatriates in England. They were dissolved in 2014.

== History ==
London South Africa was originally envisioned by Jason Smith, a South African sports agent, shortly after the Kolpak ruling. He had representations from ten South Africa national rugby union team players to establish a club in England for the South African expatriate community. There had previously been a South African expatriate team in England called London Springboks RFC who were founded in 1996 but merged with nearby Sudbury RFC three years later.

Smith's initial plan was to purchase a National League 1 club, rename the club, relocate them to London and earn their way to promotion to the English Premiership. Eventually such a move failed so Smith moved lower down the divisions and started discussions with Wimbledon RFC to purchase the club and take over their position in London 2 South in 2004. However, in light of Smith's publicised plans and a rival operation called London Tribes RFC planning a similar move, Wimbledon rejected the offer and the Rugby Football Union also prohibited the attempt. As such, London South Africa were formed as a new club and made an application to join the Surrey Rugby Football Union. Their application was successful and they started playing in the bottom tier of English rugby. They initially started playing in Wimbledon but moved to Imber Court in Esher, Surrey.

The club's name was challenged in court by a man who claimed he owned the trademark to the London South Africa name since 2000. However the claim was denied as there was no evidence of him using the name for a rugby club beyond occasional scratch teams of South Africans for rugby sevens and rugby tens competitions. During their first three years of existence, they won three consecutive promotions. In 2009, they sent a team to the international beach rugby championships, finishing fifth. Despite early success, the club folded in 2014.
