= David Brooks (rugby union) =

British Lions & England international rugby union player

David Kenneth Brooks (12 March 1924 – January 2002 (aged 77–78)) was born in Merton Park attending Rutlish School (1935–42) before embarking on wartime service with the Fleet Air Arm flying a Swordfish which he described as "an aircraft of ponderous design and purpose. Quite suitable, I thought".

After the end of the Second World War he joined the family business and combined his career with playing rugby for Harlequins who he joined in 1943, emerging in the post-war years alongside the likes of Alan Grimsdell, Hugh Forbes and Roger ‘Chalky’ Whyte who were said to have "added to the strength and flair of the side". From 1952 to 1954 'Brooky' captained Harlequins, whilst further honours were gained as he played for Surrey (captain 1950–52) and London Counties. A back-row player, in his 16 years with Harlequins he made 161 appearances for the 1XV scoring a total of 43 points including 13 tries.

During his playing career Brooks combined his playing exploits with work as the press officer for Harlequins (and Surrey RFU), and he went on to manage Quins on their 1956 tour of Romania which "would establish “Brooky’s” reputation as a tour manager who could get out of seemingly hopeless situations with the appropriate diplomatic touch". A further Quins tour, this one to South Africa, followed in 1966 with Brooks as manager which proved to be a dress-rehearsal for what was to follow two years later.

"Wrecker", as he came to be known and who was described by Roger Young as " rugby's answer to Oliver Reed...who like nothing better than a party each night..." was to manage the British & Irish Lions on their 1968 tour to South Africa where they began with 6 opening provincial wins including a 32–6 victory over Rhodesia a fixture which he was instrumental in arranging as he refused to take delivery of telegram stating the team was not to go. This promising start to the tour was not to last though as the Springboks were ready for them in Pretoria and got the better of the Lions to record a 25–20 victory in the first Test. The team went on to win 15 of their 16 provincial games but South Africa prevailed in the four match Test series 3–0 with 1 match drawn.

Later in life David would go on to be President of Surrey (1971–73) and in time became President of the RFU from 1981 to 1982 during which time he advocated the introduction of a club championship and the using sponsorship in the 'right way' for the good of the game. He never forgot that sport was something to be enjoyed maintaining that "rugby...is a leisure pursuit, not a business".

He became a Life President of Harlequins in 1990.

Away from rugby having made his living in the family fruit business he went on to become managing director of banana importer Geest Industries before, in 1976, setting up his own fruit import business; he retired in 1990. In 1950 he married Anne Jefferson (d.1996) with who he had two sons and two daughters. David's youngest grandson Mark Tampin played professional rugby for Rotherham Titans, Jersey Reds, Ealing Trailfinders and Newcastle Falcons.
