= Stanley Couchman =

- Full name: Stanley Randall Couchman
- Born: 10 August 1913 London, England
- Died: 20 November 1992 (aged 79) Greenwich, Kent, England
- School: Cranleigh School
- Notable relative: James Couchman (son)

Rugby union career
- Position: Lock
International career
Years	Team	Apps	(Points)
1938	British Lions		

Stanley Randall Couchman (10 August 1913 – 20 November 1992) was an English international rugby union player.

Couchman was born in London and attended Cranleigh School.

A second row forward, Couchman competed for Old Cranleighans and was a regular representative player with Surrey, making 45 appearances for the county. He was an England trialist and in 1938 toured with the British Lions to South Africa, where he played 11 matches. After retiring, Couchman became an administrator and served as president of Surrey RFU from 1958 to 1961, then had a term as Rugby Football Union president in 1978–79.

Couchman's son James was a Conservative member of parliament for Gillingham.

== See also ==
- List of British & Irish Lions players
