= Camberley RFC =

English rugby union club, based in Surrey

Camberley
- Full name: Camberley Rugby Football Club
- Union: Surrey RFU
- Nickname: The Squirrels
- Founded: 1931; 95 years ago
- Location: Camberley, Surrey, England
- Ground: Watchetts Recreation Ground
- League: Regional 1 South Central
- 2025–26: 12th (relegated to Regional 2 South Central)
Team kit

Official website
- www.camberleyrugbyclub.co.uk

Camberley Rugby Football Club is a sports club based in Camberley, Surrey. Camberley RFC mens 1st XV competes in Regional 2 South Central (level 6). The club also runs Kids (Under 7's to Under 11's), Youth (Under 12's to Under 16's) and a women's section.

== History ==
Camberley Rugby Football Club was founded in 1931 and played its first game at Watchetts Recreation Ground in October of that year. The club affiliated to the Surrey Rugby Union in 1933. Initially Camberley had use of the cricket pavilion as tenants of the cricket club, but constructed their own clubhouse in 1970. In March 1973, the first team won the Surrey Cup.

When league rugby was introduced in 1987, the club was placed in London 2 South.

== Men's honours ==
Men's 1st XV
League

- London 2 South champions: 1992–93
- London 3 South West runners up: 2010–11
- London 3 South West champions: 2015–16
- London 2 South West champions: 2017–18
- London 1 South champions (2): 2021–22

Cup

- Surrey Cup winners (3): 1972–73, 1994–95, 1997–98
- Surrey Trophy winners 2015–16
- RFU National Trophy winners 2017-2018

== Men's rugby ==
=== Men's 1st XV seasons ===
Season	League	Finish	Number of teams
2000–01			
2001–02			
2002–03			
2003–04	London 1	11th	12
2004–05	London 2 South	12th	12
2005–06	London 3 South West	4th	12
2006–07	London 3 South West	11th	12
2007–08	London 4 South West	7th	12
2008–09	London 4 South West	8th	12
2009–10	London 3 South West	9th	12
2010–11	London 3 South West	2nd	12
2011–12	London 2 South West	7th	12
2012–13	London 2 South West	12th	12
2013–14	London 3 South West	11th	12
2014–15	Surrey 1	2nd	10
2015–16	London 3 South West	1st	12
2016–17	London 2 South West	2nd	12
2017–18	London 2 South West	1st	12
2018–19	London 1 South	3rd	14
2019–20	London 1 South	3rd	14
2020–21	Season cancelled due to COVID-19		
2021–22	London 1 South	1st	13
2022–23	Regional 1 South Central	3rd	12
2023–24	Regional 1 South Central	2nd	12
2024–25	Regional 1 South Central	4th	12

== Women's rugby ==
=== Women's 1st XV seasons ===
Season	League	Finish	Number of teams
2020–21	align=center colspan="7" Season cancelled due to COVID-19		
2021–22	Women's NC 3 South East (South)	6th	7
2022–23	Women's NC 3 South East (South)	5th	6
2023–24	Women's NC 3 South East (West)	4th	7
2024–25	Women's NC 3 South East (West)	TBC	7
