= Lennox Football Club =

English former rugby union club, based in London

(England) Lennox Football Club
- Full name: Lennox Football Club
- Union: Rugby Football Union
- Founded: 1883
- Disbanded: between 1913 and 1920
- Location: London, England
- Ground(s): 1883 to 1885 - Clapham Common; 1885 to 1888 - Dulwich Village; 1888 to 1890s - Turney Road, Dulwich; 1890s to 1905 - London Athletic Club ground at Stamford Bridge, Chelsea; 1905 to 1907 - Cricklewood; 1907 - Wimbledon; 1910 - Northfield

Lennox Football Club was an English 19th century rugby union football club that disbanded in the early twentieth century. It is notable for producing a number of international players and for its role in the Rugby Football Union fight against professionalism.

== History ==
Lennox was founded in 1883, and as a sporting club played both rugby and cricket. The origins of its name are open to speculation, with Lennox being an area in central Scotland, and also a surname.

The club played at Clapham Common and changed at the Clapham Dining Rooms. Within two years the club had a first class fixture list and had moved from Clapham to a ground next to the Greyhound pub in Dulwich Village. At this time they changed their strip from the original dark blue with a badge to black, white and red hooped jerseys. They stayed in Dulwich throughout the rest of the 1880s and early 1890s, although in 1888 they had moved from Dulwich Village to Turney Road where they used the Crown Hotel to change. During their time in Turney Road their cricketing arm, Lennox CC, merged with Aeolian CC, also based on Turney Road, to form Dulwich Cricket Club, which still exists into the twenty-first century. From the 1890s, the home ground of the club was that of the London Athletic Club, situated in the Fulham Road, Chelsea. The original grounds were closed after the last athletics meeting on 24 September 1904, "and a new and larger track was made, partly on the same site, with a banked track for cycling and seating accommodation for 10,000 people. The new area of seventeen acres was still known as Stamford Bridge, and the L.A.C. opened with a meeting on 10 May 1905. During the winter months the ground is used by the Chelsea Football Club."

The club were affiliated to the Surrey county and won the inaugural Surrey Cup, first played for in 1891. However, they do not appear at this stage to have been considered a prominent London side having not been mentioned in Francis Marshall's 1892 publication, Football; the Rugby union game. However, in 1893 they gained more renown through the actions of H.E. Steed. On 20 September 1893, J. A. Miller of the Yorkshire county proposed at a meeting of the Rugby Football Union that players be allowed compensation for bona fide loss of time. This was seconded by his fellow Yorkshireman M. Newsome. The honorary secretary of the RFU, George Rowland Hill, opposed this and he was supported by R Whalley of Lancashire. A vote was cast and won by 282 to 136 votes in favour of declining to sanction the proposal for compensation for bona fide loss of time. Present at the meeting were an enormous amount of representatives from the north of England who had travelled to support the vote for compensation, having used two special trains for the purpose. However, H.E. Steed, of Lennox, described as a remarkable organiser, had already gained the proxies of 120 clubs against what was termed "professionalism".

The club maintained a first class fixture list into the early twentieth century but after their move from Stamford Bridge, they began to decline in favour and they became an almost nomadic side.

=== Disbandment ===
Dick Tyson, in London's Oldest Rugby Clubs suggests the club were wound up shortly after the 1910–11 season. However, the official site of surrey county rugby lists past presidents of the county reveals that Lennox produced three presidents for the county and that the third of these was R.A. Sawyer, who served from 1913 to 1920. Although his term was extended due to the First World War and no rugby took place in that time, it would seem certain that Lennox existed when he took office in 1913.

== Notable players ==
=== International honours ===
- Edward Barrett, played for England in 1903
- E. F. Walker, toured South Africa in 1903 with the Great Britain side
- Sidney Nelson Crowther, toured Australia and New Zealand in 1904 with the Great Britain side

=== Presidents of Surrey county ===
- T S T Tregallas (from 1903 to 1905)
- H E Steed (from 1905 to 1907)
- R A Sawyer (from 1913 to 1920)

== Club honours ==
- Surrey Cup winners: 1890
