= London 2 South =

London 2 South is an English league of Rugby Union teams, representing the second level in the Rugby Football Union's London & South East Division, making it a Level 6 league in the RFU's league hierarchy. The clubs come mainly from Hampshire, Kent, South London, Surrey and Sussex.

Promoted teams move up to London 1.

== Teams 2008–2009 ==
Previous league and season in brackets

- Basingstoke (L1 – Relegated)
- Beckenham (L2S – 7th)
- Chobham RFC (L2S – 3rd)
- Cobham RFC (L3SW – Promoted)
- Dorking RFC (L2S – 5th)
- Dover RFC (L3SE – Promoted)
- Gravesend RFC (L3SE – Promoted)
- Sidcup RFC (L2S – 6th)
- Maidstone FC (L2S – 8th)
- Old Colfeians (former pupils of Colfe's School) (L2S – 9th)
- Thanet Wanderers (L1 – Relegated)
- Tunbridge Wells RFC (L2S – 4th)
