= Guildford Rugby =

English rugby union club, based in Guildford

Guildford RFC
- Full name: Guildford Rugby Football Club
- Union: Surrey RFU
- Founded: September 2003; 22 years ago
- Location: Farncombe, Surrey, England
- Ground: Broadwater Sports Club (Capacity: All Standing)
- Chairman: Rob Newnes-Smith
- President: John 'Rocky' Allen
- Coach: Chris Cracknell
- Captain: Damien Kellerman
- League: Regional 2 South Central
1st kit	2nd kit

Official website
- www.guildfordrugbyclub.co.uk

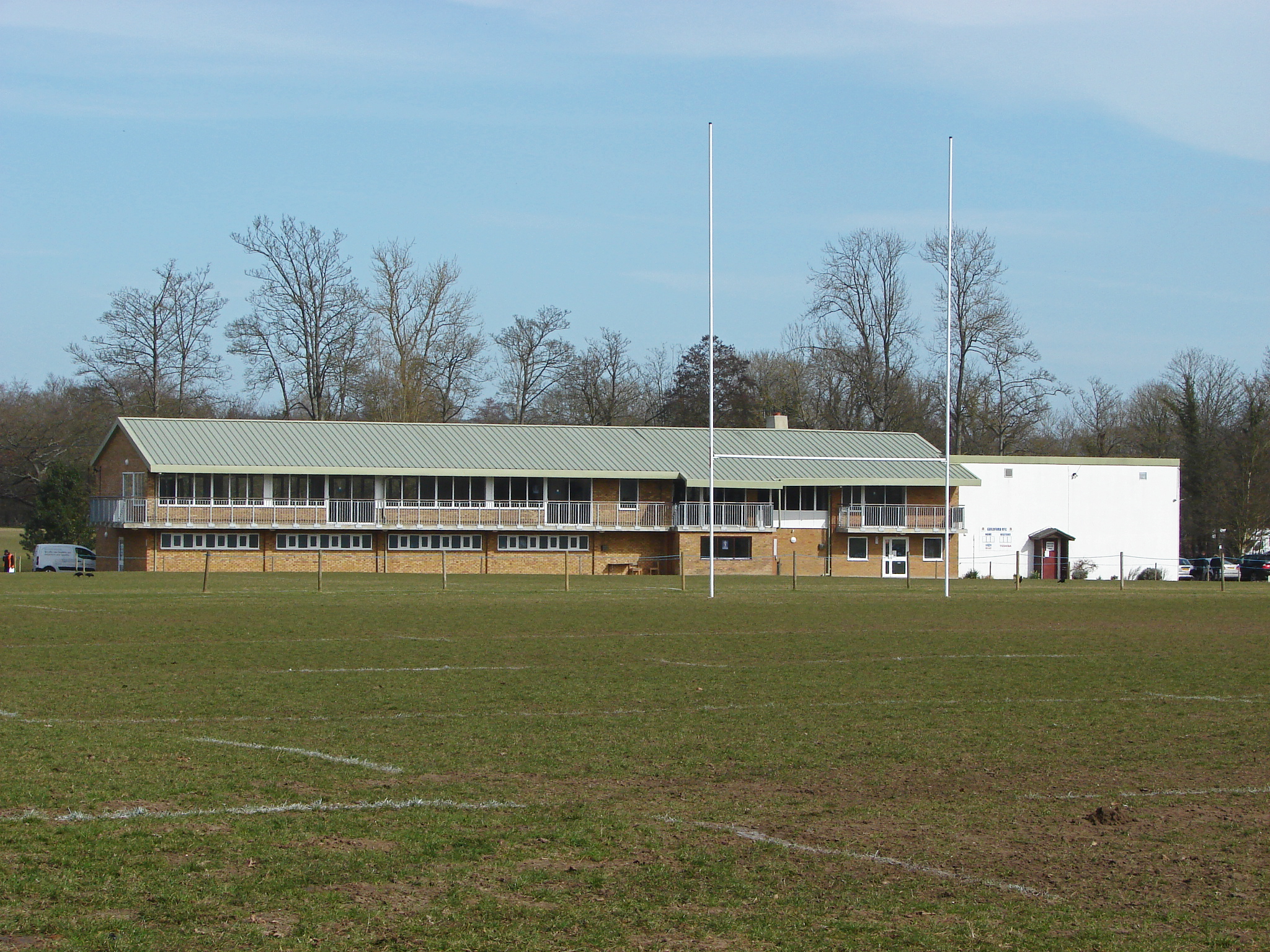
Pictured, the clubhouse in Farncombe, 2015

Guildford Rugby Club is a rugby union team that was formed in 2003 following the merger of the adult sections of Old Guildfordians RFC and Guildford & Godalming RFC. The club is based at Broadwater, which is in Farncombe, Surrey. They are currently competing in Regional 2 South East – the sixth tier of the English rugby union system.

== History ==
Guildford RFC formed in 2002 following a merger between Guildford & Godalming and Old Guildfordians rugby clubs. The first match as a single, combined team took place in September 2003 and the inaugural season was played in the then, London Division 3SW at Guildford & Godalming RFC's home in Broadwater. This is the second time that the clubs had merged, previously joining of forces in 1946. OGs broke away seven years later to form their own club and Gees – founded as Guildford Rugby Club in 1922 – switched to Broadwater simultaneously, becoming Guildford & Godalming RFC.

In addition to forming a merged men's team, the Guildford Gazelles Ladies team was also formed at this time. The Gazelles recently secured top place in the 2015-16 Women's NC South East West 1 league.

The club's 2nd XV play in Division 3 of the Zoo Sports Shield. In 2011 the clubhouse underwent an incomplete refurbishment including a new bar, function rooms, changing rooms and further plans for a gymnasium and physio rooms.

== Honours ==
=== Men's 1st XV ===
- Surrey Cup winners (4): 1971, 1972, 1980, 2015 (Note: Includes three titles won by founder club Guildford & Godalming.)
- Surrey 1 champions (2): 1987–88, 1992–93 (Note: Both titles won by founder club Old Guildfordians.)
- London 2 South West champions (3): 1995–96, 2003–04, 2013–14 (Note: Includes one title won by founder club Old Guildfordians.)
- London 1 (north v south) promotion play-off winners (2): 2005–06, 2015–16
- Surrey Trophy winners (2): 2014, 2015

=== Ladies 1st XV ===
- Women's NC South East West 1 champions: 2015–16
