= Edward Hamilton-Hill =

England international rugby union player

- Full name: Edward Alfred Hamilton-Hill
- Born: 22 November 1908 Peterborough, England
- Died: 23 October 1979 (aged 70) Shepperton, Surrey, England

Rugby union career
- Position: Wing-forward
International career
Years	Team	Apps	(Points)
1936	England	3	(0)

Commander Edward Alfred Hamilton-Hill OBE (22 November 1908 – 23 October 1979) was an English broadcasting executive, Royal Navy officer and international rugby union player.

Born in Peterborough, Hamilton-Hill was a wing-forward, capped three times for England in 1936, debuting in their historic maiden win over the All Blacks, at Twickenham. His others appearances came against Wales and Ireland in away Home Nations fixtures. He competed for Harlequins in club rugby and also played with the Royal Navy.

Hamilton-Hill served in the Royal Navy during World War II and reached the rank of Commander. He moved to Malta in 1945 to rebuild the Rediffusion radio station and became managing director of Rediffusion (Malta) Ltd. In 1961, Hamilton-Hill was made an Officer of the Order of the British Empire for his contributions to broadcasting in Malta.

== See also ==
- List of England national rugby union players
