= Wimbledon RFC =

English rugby union team, based in London

- Full name: Wimbledon Rugby Football Club
- Union: Surrey RFU
- Nickname: Dons
- Founded: 1865; 161 years ago
- Location: Raynes Park, Merton, London, England
- Ground: Beverley Meads (Capacity: 1,000)
- Chairman: Stefano D'Anna
- President: Jim Green
- Coach(es): Collin Osborne, Neil Hallett, Shawn Renwick, Marc Bertrand, James Ogilvie-Bull and William Brunt
- Captain(s): Josh Bayford
- League: Regional 1 South Central
- 2025–26: 9th
Team kit

Official website
- www.wimbledonrfc.co.uk

Wimbledon Rugby Football Club is a sports club based in Wimbledon, London. The club was a founding member of the Rugby Football Union and were at that time known as the Wimbledon Hornets. The first rugby union team currently play in Regional 1 South Central following their relegation from National League 2 East at the end of 2023–24 season. Apart from rugby, the club has a netball section.

== History ==
Wimbledon’s first recorded match was against Richmond F.C. in November 1865, making the club one of the oldest in the country, and one of just twelve surviving clubs that founded the Rugby Football Union in 1871. The club’s captain at this time was L J Maton who drafted the first laws of the game and went on to become the third president of the RFU in 1875. In the same year, two club members, J D and H J Graham, gained one and four caps respectively for England.

In 1874 the club changed its name to Wimbledon RFC. It has been suggested that the change in name was due to the club's L J Maton becoming president of the Rugby Football Union, and in order to reflect their new-found gravitas they dispensed with the Hornets for a less whimsical name.

They played on Wimbledon Common until World War I, using the Rose & Crown in Wimbledon Village as changing rooms and clubhouse. The club then went into suspended animation when the First World War started, and was only re-formed in 1927. It was at this time that the club changed colours from broad blue and white hooped jerseys, to maroon and Cambridge blue hooped jerseys. The club's celebration of its centenary with a dinner held in February 1966, was demonstrative that it perceived itself a continuation of the original Wimbledon Hornets. They moved to the current clubhouse on Barham Road, Wimbledon in the 1987–88 season, coinciding with the setting up of amateur league rugby in Britain.

== Honours ==
1st team:

- Surrey 2 champions: 1989–90
- Surrey 1 champions: 1993–94
- London 3 South West champions: 1994–95
- London 1 South champions (2): 1995–96, 2014–15
- London 2 (south-east v south-west) promotion play-off winners (2): 2008–09, 2011–12
- National League 3 (south-east v south-west) promotion play-off winners: 2016–17
- Regional 1 South Central champions: 2022–23

2nd team:

- Surrey Cup winners: 2018

== Club colours ==
Wimbledon 1st team play in maroon shirts with blue sleeves and a blue stripe on the side. They wear navy shorts and navy socks.

All other teams play in maroon and blue hooped shirts with navy shorts and navy socks.

== Teams ==
Wimbledon has four men's teams, a ladies team and a thriving youth & mini section.

The men's teams Wimbledon currently has four men's teams.

The 1st team play in London & South East Premier (Nat3SE), as a result of result of relegation from National League 2S in the 2017–18 season. The 2nd team play in the Zoo Sports Shield Division 1 having won consecutive promotions from Division 3 and 2 in the 2015–16/2016-17 seasons. The 3rds or Mavericks as they are fondly known and the 4ths Strollers (the Vets team) compete in the Surrey Leagues.

The ladies team The ladies team was founded in the 1990–91 season by Tina and John Ambler, club stewards from 1989 to 1993. Their team mascot is Alderney, one of The Wombles.

The first ladies match was against a selection of players from the men's teams. Due to a lack of playing experience the men emerged the victors. Since then, the Ladies section has grown from strength to strength with several of the players reaching national and international level.

The team currently plays in the Championship South West 2 League and has a regular squad of over thirty ladies as well as strong mini and youth section offering rugby for all ability levels from 5 to 18.

== Notable former players ==
- Madison Hughes ( (United States) ) USA Rugby Sevens (first capped 2012)
- H J Graham ( (England) ) (first capped 1875)
- J D Graham ( (England) ) (first capped 1875)
