= London Irish Amateur =

English rugby union club, based in Sunbury-on-Thames

Coordinates: 51°24′27″N 0°25′16″W

(England) London Irish Amateur
- Full name: London Irish Amateur Rugby Football Club
- Unions: Surrey RFU; Ireland RFU; Rugby Football Union
- Nickname: The Wild Geese
- Founded: 1999; 27 years ago
- Location: Sunbury-on-Thames, Surrey, England
- Ground: Hazelwood (Capacity: 2,000)
- Chairman: Paul O’Callaghan
- President: Nic Jackson
- League: Regional 2 Thames
- 2025–26: 10th

Official website
- www.liarfc.co.uk

London Irish Amateur Rugby Football Club, also known as London Irish Wild Geese, is an amateur English rugby union club based in Sunbury-on-Thames, Surrey, who play their rugby in Regional 2 Thames– a league at tier 6 of the English rugby union system – following their relegation from London & South East Premier at the end of the 2019–20 season. They are the amateur team of former professional team London Irish and play at Hazelwood.

== History ==
London Irish Amateur's former logo

The creation of London Irish Amateur was first discussed in 1995 when rugby union became professional and London Irish set aside resources for the creation of an amateur team. The club was founded in September 1999 after London Irish left The Avenue to play at the Twickenham Stoop before moving to Madejski Stadium in Reading the following year. It was formed to be the feeder club for senior and junior amateur players to then go on to play for London Irish, who until the end of the 2015–16 season played in the English Premiership. A few players such as Adrian Flavin, Tom Smallbone, Paul Burke, Kevin Barret, Justin Bishop and Kieran Campbell went on to play international rugby.

London Irish and London Irish Amateur jointly share the new Hazelwood rugby complex. Since 2012, links between London Irish and London Irish Amateur have been upgraded with the two becoming part of a joint venture in which London Irish Amateur players play for London Irish in the A League. In return, members of London Irish's Academy are entitled to play for London Irish Amateur.

The first team's official name was changed to London Irish Wild Geese after the Rugby Football Union's governance committee gave consent for the change of name. In 2011, they were promoted from London 1 into National League 3 London & SE. In 2012, they were moved into National League 3 South West. In 2013, they were promoted into National League 2 South.

London Irish Amateur is a separate legal entity to London Irish Rugby Football Club and was not part of its administration.

London Irish Amateur receives a grant from the Irish Government's Emigrant Support Programme to support Mini Rugby.

== London Irish ladies ==
London Irish Amateur Emeralds were formed in 2015 and completed in their first fixtures in season 2016 to 2017. In season 2017 to 2018 they competed in Women's NC South East West 3 and were promoted.

London Irish Ladies currently compete in the Women's Championship South 1 with home fixtures played at Hazelwood.

== Mini and youth rugby ==
London Irish Amateur have both mini (school year reception to 6) and youth sections (school year 7 to 12) based at Hazelwood (Rugby Ground). Mini Rugby is the game for all players, male and female who play together. Youth Rugby is a game for boys and girls aged 12 – 17 who play in gender based teams.

The club hold an annual International Mini and U12 Festival each year which is frequented by teams from the home nations and Europe.

The Youth Girls section host the annual Middlesex Rugby Emerald International Girls Festival.

== Walking rugby ==
Since September 2022, walking rugby has been played at the club, intended to be a simple version of rugby suitable for ex-players, injured players, and non-players of all ages, abilities and gender who enjoy an active, physical, and competitive passing game using a rugby ball.

== Honours ==
- Surrey 1 champions: 2001–02
- London 2 (south-east v south-west) promotion play-off winner: 2005–06
- London Division 2 South West champions: 2009–10
- Surrey Trophy winners (2): 2010, 2011
- London 1 (north v south) promotion play-off winner: 2010–11
- National League 3 South-West champions: 2012–13
- Surrey Cup winners: 2013
- National League 3 London & SE champions: 2015–16
- Women's NC South East Middle 2 champions: 2018–19
- Women's Championship South West 2 champions: 2021–22

== Coaching staff ==
- Chair of Men's Rugby: Joe Byrne
- Manager: Trevor Johnson
- Head Coach: Ryan Gregory
- Forwards Coach: Matthew Cornish
- Defence Coach: Hugh O'Sullivan
- Attack and Skills: Paddy Jackson
- Strength and Conditioning: Willie Lafolafo

== See also ==
- London Irish
- Hazelwood (Rugby Ground)
- London Irish Wild Geese
- London Irish Women
