= Sutton & Epsom RFC =

English rugby union club, based in London

Sutton and Epsom RFC
- Full name: Sutton and Epsom Rugby Union Football Club
- Union: Surrey RFU
- Emblem: Penny Farthing
- Founded: 1881; 145 years ago
- Location: Epsom, Cheam, Sutton, London, England
- Ground(s): Rugby Lane, Priest Hill
- Chairman: (England) Ryan Reino
- Director of Rugby: (England) Andrew Spooner
- Coach(es): (England) Paul Hodgson, (England) Alex Dombrandt, (England) Nick Harris, (England) Davinia Caitlin
- League: Regional 2 South East
- 2024–25: 4th
Team kit

Official website
- www.suttonrugby.co.uk

Sutton & Epsom Rugby Football Club is a rugby union club based in Rugby Lane, Cheam, London, having been formed in 1881. The club first played against Saracens in the 1883–84 season as one of their very early opponents and in 1901 beat Stade Francais on their home ground. They currently play in Regional 2 South East.

== Overview ==
The club has a total of twenty-five teams with 1,200 current and former playing members, plus 1,800 social members who are usually members of their families. There are currently seven adult teams for men headed by a first XV and the club was one of the first to form an adult ladies rugby squad. The club has both mini and junior rugby sections and run 60 children strong development groups for those at under 5 and under 6. The Rugby Football Union national guidelines for children of these ages were based upon this approach and that of Ealing RFC. The club run similar sized age groups for both boys and girls at each of the under-7 to under-12 age groups, at each of which they play to a nationally recognised and tailored game format. The club's record home league win, came at the start of the 2024–25 season, where they won 50 – 7 vs Old Colfeians — a game which saw a completely changed squad from that of the season prior. The side featured eight debutants, including new signing 7s International – Arun Watkins.

The club has nine senior sides:

1. First XV

2. Swallows

3. Swifts

4. Extra Bs

5. Development

6. Vets

7. Under 22's

8. Colts

9. Ladies

== The Ladies ==
Sutton and Epsom RFC Ladies team has been available for all women for ten years now, accessible for anyone over the age of 18 who wish to pursue the game of rugby. The Sutton And Epsom squad have recently been promoted into the RFUW NC South East South 2 division. Sutton and Epsom Ladies have managed to make a season of being recently promoted to a close 3rd position in the 2009–10 season. Not only are the ladies succeeding on the rugby field but also socially; with charity events and individual donations Sutton and Epsom Ladies managed to raise £1396.10 for Breast Cancer appeal. With intent this season to improve on last years donations, starting off with the 5K run on 5 September 2010 at Hyde Park and plans to complete the Palace to Palace ride on 26 September 2010.

== U22's ==
The U22’s compete in the John Douglas Cup, a Surrey Rugby competition with matches being played during the Christmas and Easter breaks allowing for the inclusion of returning University students and players in the senior squads.

Sutton have won the competitions 4 times, the joint most tied with Cobham RFC. The victories both came in back-to-back fashion, first in the 2007/08 & 2008/09 seasons and most recently in 2022/23 & 2023/24 where they achieved two unbeaten campaigns.

== Honours ==
- Surrey Cup winners (10): 1897, 1898, 1909, 1984, 1990, 1991, 1997, 2000, 2008, 2009
- London 1 South champions (2): 2006–07, 2015–16
- London 2 (south-east v south-west) promotion play-off winners: 2012–13
- London & South East Premier champions: 2018–19
