= Streatham-Croydon RFC =

English rugby union club, based in Croydon

(England) Streatham-Croydon R.F.C.
- Full name: Streatham-Croydon Rugby Football Club
- Union: Middlesex RFU, Surrey RFU
- Founded: 1871; 155 years ago as 'Streatham F.C.'
- Location: Thornton Heath, Croydon, London, England
- Ground: Frant Road (Capacity: 2,000 (200 seats))
- President: (England) F. Oresanya
- Captain: (England) L. Denney
- League: Counties 3 Surrey

Official website
- www.pitchero.com/clubs/streathamcroydonrugbyfootballclub/

The Streatham-Croydon Rugby Football Club, is a rugby union club, founded in 1871, based at Frant Road, Thornton Heath, in the London Borough of Croydon, south London. Streatham-Croydon currently play in Counties Surrey 3. The club's teams play in cardinal shirts, white shorts and cardinal and white hooped socks.

== History ==
Streatham's heyday was arguably during the late 1960s, and 70s, when 9 senior teams and 4 colts teams were active, combined with an extensive fixture list against top clubs such as Richmond, Bath, Sale, Saracens, London Welsh, London Irish and others. The professional era and the impact of the new RFU Courage League structure through the late 1980s, and 90s led to a decline in the size of the club as greater attention was paid to the needs of the 1st XV, and Streatham's membership struggle coincided with its drop down the National and then London leagues.

Streatham run three senior men's teams and a senior ladies' XV during the season, as well as a mini and junior rugby section, and own a private ground in Thornton Heath (close to the original pitches on Streatham Common), comprising two pitches (one floodlit) and a large clubhouse and grandstand, along with several squash courts, which are all in the process of refurbishment and renovation.

In the club's 140th season the Surrey 4 league title was won following only one defeat and the club were promoted to Surrey 3. As part of the 140th season, a fixture known as 'The Skull' was revived, 20 years after it was last contested. The fixture sees all Streatham-Croydon's teams play against teams from Esher RFC with the club that wins the most matches winning the trophy. The trophy is a human skull set between a pair of rugby goalposts. In the 1960s, and 70s this would have been contested by twelve teams from each club, but now Streatham's team play against Esher's similarly ranked amateur teams.

The Streatham club was featured in a book titled "London's Oldest Rugby Clubs" by Dick Tyson, published in May 2008.

The club has been a key factor in the growth of rugby league in South London, having hosted the South London Storm for many years. Frant Road now hosts the Storm's successor club, Brixton Bulls R.L.F.C. during the summer months, providing training, playing and social facilities.

== Notable players ==
John Sharland of Streatham toured with the 1904 British Lions to Australia and New Zealand, playing in seven matches. W V Butcher, capped seven times for England between 1903–05, also playing cricket for Surrey, played for the Streatham club. England prop, and later RFU committee man, Jeff Probyn played at Streatham for a number of seasons in the late 1970s before moving to Wasps and gaining his first England cap. Super League player Will Sharp, played for the 1st XV, before signing his first professional contract with Harlequins RL in 2007. Celebrity chef Antony Worrall Thompson played for the club's Colts side from 1969–71 before touring France to learn his trade. Former Prime Minister James Callaghan played at lock for Streatham in the 1939 season. Peter Horton, Colts and 1st XV, emigrated to Australia and played hooker 19 times for Australia between 1974 and 1979, gaining his first cap against New Zealand and his last one against Argentina.

- Jeff Probyn
- Maurice Colclough
- Will Sharp
- Antony Worrall Thompson
- James Callaghan
- Lamont Bryan
- Grace Moore (rugby union)
- Sadia Kabeya

== Honours ==
- Surrey Cup winners (6): 1894, 1895, 1896, 1903, 1974, 1975 (Note: Includes 4 titles won as Streatham RFC.)
- Surrey 4 champions (2): 2010–11, 2021–22
- Surrey 3 champions (2): 2011–12, 2015–16
- Surrey Bowl winners: 2012, 2022
