= Surrey Rugby Football Union =

(England) Surrey RFU
- Full name: Surrey Rugby Football Union
- Union: RFU
- Founded: 1879; 147 years ago
- Region: Surrey, parts of London
- President: Jo Fisher
Team kit

Official website
- www.surreyrugby.co.uk

The Surrey County Rugby Football Union is the union responsible for rugby union in the county of Surrey, England, and parts of London. It is one of the constituent bodies of the national Rugby Football Union having been formed in 1879.

== History ==
=== Early years of County representative team ===
The earliest recorded game played by a team purporting to represent Surrey under rugby union auspices was played before the Surrey County Club has been formed. This was played on 21 February 1878 against Middlesex and won by Surrey with a try scored by AS Trevor.

=== Formation of the County Club ===
On 22 December 1879, a meeting was held at the York Hotel, on Waterloo Road, South London (then in Surrey), at which the County Club was formed. Two fixtures were played that season. The first was against Middlesex which turned out to be an easy win for Surrey. However, their confidence was put into check when they were soundly beaten by Yorkshire. Another match with Middlesex was played at Old Deer Park on 6 December 1880 with the result of each fifteen scoring one goal, in what was described as a ″splendidly-contested game″.

== County side ==
=== Honours ===
County Championship finals (2 wins);

Year	Winners	Home team	Score	Away team	Venue	Notes
1896	Yorkshire	Surrey	4 – 16	Yorkshire	Richmond	
1938	Lancashire	Lancashire	24 – 12	Surrey	Blundellsands	
1960	Warwickshire	Warwickshire	9 – 6	Surrey	Coundon Road, Coventry	
1967	(replay)	Surrey	14 – 14	Durham County	Twickenham	
1967	(replay)	Durham County	0 – 0	Surrey	Hartlepool	title shared after a drawn replay
1971	Surrey	Gloucestershire	3 – 14	Surrey	Kingsholm	

County Championship Shield finals (4 wins);

Year	Winners	Score	Runners-up	Notes
2005	Surrey	29 - 18	Somerset	
2011	Dorset & Wilts	43 – 22	Surrey	
2012	Surrey	43 – 12	Leicestershire	
2013	Surrey	21 – 16	Cumbria	
2014	Surrey	39 – 12	Leicestershire	

County Championship Plate finals (1 win);

Year	Winners	Score	Runners-up	Notes
2015	Surrey	17 – 3	Eastern Counties	

=== Notable players for the County side ===
Many notable players have represented Surrey. The most appearances in County Championship games for the Surrey side have been by:

- Bob Hiller (Harlequins) – 68
- Bob Lloyd (Harlequins) – 46
- Stanley Couchman (Old Cranleighans) – 45
- Ted Priest (Old Alleynians) – 39

Other famous players include:

- George Doherty (former captain of Ireland)
- Jonny Wilkinson
- Fraser Gore

== Presidents ==
- 2025-2026 Mrs J Fisher (Chobham)
- 2024-2025 J Pownall (Farnham)
- 2023-2024 D Doonan (Barnes)
- 2022-2023 G Ashburn (Mitcham & Carshalton)
- 2020-2021 T Long (London Irish Amateur)
- 2019-2020 N Heslop (Chobham)
- 2018-2019 D Druckman (KCS Old Boys)
- 2017-2018 Mrs J Anastasi (Richmond)
- 2016-2017 J Collins (Warlingham)
- 2015-2016 T Sokell (Effingham & Leatherhead)
- 2014-2015 J Raywood (Sutton & Epsom)
- 2013-2014 K Heal (Egham Hollowegians)
- 2012-2013 I Thirlwall (Chipstead)
- 2011-2012 P A Agate (Warlingham)
- 2009-2011 F U Batchelor (Old Freemens)
- 2008-2009 J N Vale (Sutton & Epsom)
- 2007-2008 G Hunt (Chobham)
- 2006-2007 E C S Ivens (Dorking)
- 2005-2006 E J StJ Thomas (Sutton & Epsom)
- 2003-2005 J E Douglas (Dorking)
- 2001-2003 Dr J D Carroll (Guildford)
- 1999-2001 J D E Hamilton (KCS Old Boys)
- 1997-1999 R N Chamberlain (Camberley)
- 1995-1997 J G Kemp (Wasps)
- 1993-1995 B P Miles (University Vandals)
- 1991-1993 C M Herridge (Cobham and Harlequins)
- 1989-1991 J P Collis (Old Whitfitians)
- 1987-1989 E G Lovering (Bec Old Boys)
- 1985-1987 D S Straw (Old Whitgiftians)
- 1983-1985 D E Wood (Streatham-Croydon)
- 1981-1983 R M Bartlett (Harlequins)
- 1979-1981 B Utting (Streatham-Croydon)
- 1978-1979 M F Turner (Old Whitgiftians)
- 1977-1978 R C Finch (Old Rustlishians)
- 1975-1977 A T T Street (Guildford & Godalming)
- 1973-1975 M F Turner (Old Whitgiftians)
- 1971-1973 D K Brooks (Harlequins)
- 1968-1971 D H Frankford (Old Alleynians)
- 1967-1968 F J Monkhouse (University Vandals)
- 1964-1967 J H S Howard (Streatham-Croydon)
- 1962-1964 B E Nicholson (Old Whitgiftians)
- 1961-1962 T E Priest (Old Alleynians)
- 1958-1961 S R Couchman (Old Cranleighans)
- 1957-1958 H A Brashier (Blackheath and Esher)
- 1955-1957 E C P Whitely (Old Alleynians)
- 1950-1955 H R Frisby (Streatham)
- 1948-1950 A J Trollope (Croydon)
- 1920-1948 A D Stoop (Harlequins)
- 1913-1920 R A Sawyer (Lennox)
- 1911-1913 C T Mabey (Streatham)
- 1909-1911 H J Barclay (Sutton)
- 1907-1909 M F Waters (Old Merchant Taylors)
- 1905-1907 H E Steed (Lennox)
- 1903-1905 T S T Tregallas (Lennox)
- 1901-1903 L Mortimer (Richmond)

== Affiliated clubs ==
There are currently 70 full member mens adult clubs affiliated with the Surrey RFU, most of which have teams at both senior and junior level and are based in Surrey and parts of London. Many of the London-based sides are also members of the Middlesex RFU.

- Barnes (Note: Barnes are joint members of both the Middlesex RFU and Surrey RFU.)
- Battersea Ironsides (Note: Ironsides are joint members of both the Middlesex RFU and Surrey RFU.)
- Bec Old Boys (Note: Bec Old Boys are joint members of both the Middlesex RFU and Surrey RFU.)
- Camberley
- Chipstead
- Chobham
- Cobham
- Cranleigh RFC
- Croydon (Note: Croydon are joint members of both the Middlesex RFU and Surrey RFU.)
- Dorking
- Economicals
- Effingham & Leatherhead (Note: Effingham & Leatherhead are joint members of both the Middlesex RFU and Surrey RFU.)
- Egham Hollowegians
- Esher
- Farnham
- Guildford
- Guildfordians
- Harlequins Amateurs
- Haslemere
- KCS Old Boys
- Kew Occasionals
- Kingston
- Kingston University
- Law Society
- Lightwater
- London Exiles (Note: London Exiles are joint members of both the Middlesex RFU and Surrey RFU.)
- London Irish Wild Geese (Note: London Irish Wild Geese are joint members of both the Middlesex RFU and Surrey RFU.)
- Merton (Note: Merton are joint members of both the Middlesex RFU and Surrey RFU.)
- Met Police
- Mitcham & Carshalton
- Old Alleynians
- Old Blues
- Old Caterhamians
- Old Cranleighans
- Old Emanuel (Note: Old Emanuel are joint members of both the Middlesex RFU and Surrey RFU.)
- Old Freemen's
- Old Georgians
- Old Haileyburians (Note: Old Haileyburians are joint members of both the Middlesex RFU and Surrey RFU.)
- Old Johnian
- Old Oundelians
- Old Pauline (Note: Old Pauline are joint members of both the Middlesex RFU and Surrey RFU.)
- Old Reigatian
- Old Rutlishians
- Old Suttonians
- Old Tiffinians (Note: Old Tiffinians are joint members of both the Middlesex RFU and Surrey RFU.)
- Old Walcountians
- Old Whitgiftian (Note: Old Whitgiftian are joint members of both the Middlesex RFU and Surrey RFU.)
- Old Wimbledonians (Note: Old Wimbledonians are joint members of both the Middlesex RFU and Surrey RFU.)
- Purley John Fisher
- Raynes Park
- Reeds Weybridge
- Reigate & Horley (Note: In June 2019 Reigate RFC senior section 'absorbed' Horley RFC seniors and stated an intention to compete as Reigate & Horley in season 2019-20.)
- Richmond
- Rosslyn Park (Note: Rosslyn Park are joint members of both the Middlesex RFU and Surrey RFU.)
- Royal Holloway University
- South London Stags
- Southwark Tigers
- Streatham-Croydon (Note: Streatham-Croydon are joint members of both the Middlesex RFU and Surrey RFU.)
- Surbiton Decca (Note: Formerly Racal Decca)
- Sutton & Epsom
- Teddington (Note: Teddington are joint members of both the Middlesex RFU and Surrey RFU.)
- Trailfinders (Note: Ealing Trailfinders are joint members of both the Middlesex RFU and Surrey RFU.)
- Trinity (Note: Trinity were until the 2018-19 season known as Old Mid-Whitgiftian.)
- Wandsworthians
- Warlingham (Note: Warlingham are joint members of both the Middlesex RFU and Surrey RFU.)
- Weybridge Vandals
- Wimbledon (Note: Wimbledon are joint members of both the Middlesex RFU and Surrey RFU.)
- Woking
- Worth Old Boys

Defunct clubs

- Airoch Crusaders RFC
- Horley (Note: In June 2019 Reigate RFC senior section 'absorbed' Horley RFC seniors and stated an intention to compete as Reigate & Horley in season 2019-20.)
- Lennox
- London Irish (Note: Despite being currently based in Berkshire, London Irish are joint members of the Middlesex RFU and Surrey RFU.)
- Old Tonbridgians
- OR Serpents
- South Godstone
- Old Wellingtonians

== County club competitions ==
The Surrey RFU currently runs the following club competitions for club sides based in Surrey and parts of London:

=== Leagues ===
Post the 2022 Adult Competition Review

- Counties 1 Surrey / Sussex – league ranked at tier 7 of the English rugby union system
- Counties 2 Surrey – league ranked at tier 8
- Counties 3 Surrey – league ranked at tier 9
- Counties 4 Surrey – league ranked at tier 10
- Counties 5 Surrey – league ranked at tier 11

Prior to the 2022 Adult Competition Review

- Surrey 1 – league ranked at tier 9 of the English rugby union system
- Surrey 2 – tier 10 league
- Surrey 3 – tier 11 league
- Surrey 4 – tier 12 league
- Surrey 5 – tier 13 league that ran between 1989 and 1992

=== Cups ===
- Surrey Cup – founded in 1890, for local clubs at tier 5 of the English rugby union system
- Surrey Trophy – founded in 2009, for clubs at tiers 6–8
- Surrey Shield – founded in 1998, for clubs at tiers 9–10
- Surrey Bowl – founded in 2006, for clubs at tiers 11–12

== See also ==
- London & SE Division
- English rugby union system
