= Cobham RFC =

English rugby union football club

(England) Cobham RFC
- Full name: Cobham Rugby Football Club
- Union: Surrey RFU
- Founded: 1930; 96 years ago as Old Surbitonians RFC
- Location: Cobham, Surrey, England
- Ground: Old Surbitonians Memorial Ground
- Chairman: Steve Heard
- President: Ian Thomas
- Coach: Billy Davison
- Captain: Chris Lippiatt
- League: Counties 1 Surrey/Sussex
- 2025-26: 1st

Official website
- www.cobhamrfc.com

Cobham Rugby Football Club (formerly Old Surbitonians Rugby Football Club) is an English rugby union club, located in the village of Cobham, Surrey, who play in the London Division of the RFU. Cobham RFC is based at the Old Surbitonians Memorial Ground in Cobham and is affiliated to the English RFU via the Surrey RFU. The club was founded in 1930 by the first leavers of the Surbiton County Grammar (now Esher College). They currently play at level 7 in Counties 1 Surrey/Sussex.

== History ==
The club was formed in 1930 as Old Surbitonians RFC by the first group of school leavers from Surbiton County Grammar School for Boys. In 1949, as a memorial to those Old Boys who perished in World War II, the grounds at Fairmile Lane, Cobham, were purchased. After the school moved from its original site in Surbiton to Esher as a boys' grammar school, The Braemar Club was created to honour the old school building. The change of name of the school to Esher County Grammar School and more prominently the evolution of the old school into a mixed sixth form college had a significant and detrimental impact on the flow of young players into the Club, which was one of the driving forces behind the club being one of the first in the country to set up a Mini Rugby section, in the Golden Jubilee year of 1980. The club was placed in the first division of the new Surrey Leagues when the RFU introduced League Rugby in 1987. Prior to this, the club had enjoyed much success, including a famous unbeaten season of 1963–64, and a Surrey Cup Final appearance in 1976. The club changed its name in 1989 to Cobham Rugby Football Club, to both identify more closely with the immediate surrounding area, and to signify the change to an open membership club. Recent years have seen the clubs' steady progress through the leagues, with four promotions in six seasons in the Leagues since 1987, and success elsewhere in winning the Surrey Shield in 1999. The first team now play in London South following successive promotions. Despite its name change, it still recognises its heritage and association with the old school.

During 2007 the club raised significant funds from within, alongside a legacy from a former player, Peter Marsh, which was Sportsmatched allowing the rebuilding of the clubhouse with a two-storey sports and social facility. It announced on 9 May 2011 the acquisition of rights to double the playing areas to six pitches by utilising the derelict golf driving range behind the local Fairmile Pub. The rugby club share the facilities with Cobham Tennis, Cobham Lacrosse and Cobham Netball.

In 2015 Cobham RFC was one of only six rugby clubs to host international teams for the 2015 Rugby World Cup. In association with ACS International school Cobham and working closely with Elmbridge Borough Council the club hosted both Namibia and Italy, the only Team Base to host two international teams.

== Honours ==
- Surrey 2 champions: 1997–98
- Surrey 1 champions: 1998–99
- Surrey Shield winners: 1999
- London 2 (south-east v south-west) promotion play-off winners: 2001–02
- London Division 4 South West champions: 2006–07
- London 2 South West champions (2): 2007–08, 2015–16
- Counties 1 Surrey/Sussex champions 2025-26
- Surrey Trophy winners: 2012

== See also ==
- Surrey RFU
