= Esher RFC =

English rugby union club, based in Surrey

- Full name: Esher Rugby Football Club
- Union: Surrey RFU
- Founded: 1923; 103 years ago
- Location: Hersham, Surrey, England
- Ground: Molesey Road (Capacity: 3,500 (1,200 seated))
- Chairman: Olly Johnson
- Director of Rugby: Mike Brown
- Coach: Chris Wilkins
- Captain: Pierre Thompson
- League: National League 2 East
- 2025–26: 11th
| 1st kit | 2nd kit |

Official website
- www.esherrugby.com

Esher Rugby Football Club is an English rugby union club based in Surrey, England. Esher currently play in the fourth tier of the English league system, National League 2 East, following their relegation from the 2024–25 National League 1.

== History ==
The club was formed in 1923 when four rugby enthusiasts agreed to start a club.

When the league system was introduced in 1987 Esher were placed in London 1, but were relegated in the first season and did not win promotion back to that league until 1993. Esher were first promoted to the national leagues system for the 1997–98 season, finishing fourth in National League 2 South. They led for most of the season the following year but finished second, but won promotion in 1999–00. The club set a new points record when winning National Division Two in 2006–07 and were thus promoted. They were promoted into the second tier, the RFU Championship after winning National League 1 in 2009–10. During this season they broke the world record when they beat Manchester 148 – 0. They played in the Championship for two seasons before being relegated back into National League 1 for the 2012–13 season.

Esher suffered another relegation at the end of the 2018–19 season, dropping down to National League 2 South, their lowest league level since the end of the 1990s. They would yo yo between the leagues over the next few years, being promoted as National 2 South champions in 2021–22 and then being relegated from National League 1 at the end of 2022–23 season.

In 2020, the club announced a two-year agreement to share their ground with RFU Championship side London Scottish starting in 2021–22. However it was later confirmed that Scottish would remain at Richmond Athletic Ground.

On 13 April 2024 Esher defeated Dorking to win National League 2 East and return to National League 1 after being relegated the season before.

== Current standings ==
2025–26 National League 2 East table
| Pos | Team | Pld | W | D | L | PF | PA | PD | TB | LB | Pts | Qualification |
|---|---|---|---|---|---|---|---|---|---|---|---|---|
| 1 | Bury St Edmunds (C) | 26 | 20 | 1 | 5 | 1128 | 659 | +469 | 22 | 4 | 108 | Promotion place |
| 2 | Oundle | 26 | 20 | 2 | 4 | 940 | 713 | +227 | 21 | 1 | 106 | Promotion Play-off |
| 3 | Old Albanian | 26 | 18 | 0 | 8 | 1009 | 813 | +196 | 22 | 3 | 97 | |
| 4 | Barnes | 26 | 16 | 1 | 9 | 738 | 598 | +140 | 15 | 5 | 86 | |
| 5 | Canterbury | 26 | 16 | 0 | 10 | 851 | 644 | +207 | 16 | 6 | 86 | |
| 6 | Dorking | 26 | 14 | 2 | 10 | 798 | 598 | +200 | 13 | 6 | 79 | |
| 7 | Westcombe Park | 26 | 12 | 0 | 14 | 851 | 751 | +100 | 19 | 8 | 75 | |
| 8 | Havant | 26 | 11 | 1 | 14 | 840 | 960 | −120 | 19 | 1 | 66 | |
| 9 | London Welsh | 26 | 10 | 0 | 16 | 705 | 866 | −161 | 16 | 8 | 64 | |
| 10 | Guernsey Raiders | 26 | 11 | 1 | 14 | 690 | 875 | −185 | 13 | 3 | 62 | |
| 11 | Esher | 26 | 10 | 0 | 16 | 844 | 831 | +13 | 16 | 6 | 62 | |
| 12 | Henley Hawks | 26 | 9 | 2 | 15 | 693 | 665 | +28 | 12 | 9 | 61 | Relegation Play-off |
| 13 | Sevenoaks (R) | 26 | 8 | 0 | 18 | 743 | 900 | −157 | 12 | 5 | 49 | Relegation place |
| 14 | Oxford Harlequins (R) | 26 | 2 | 0 | 24 | 505 | 1462 | −957 | 11 | 2 | 21 | Relegation place |

Updated to match(es) played on 2 May 2026. Source: National League Rugby
Rules for classification: If teams are level at any stage, tiebreakers are applied in the following order:
1. Number of matches won
2. Number of matches drawn
3. Difference between points for and against
4. Total number of points for
5. Aggregate number of points scored in matches between tied teams
6. Number of matches won excluding the first match, then the second and so on until the tie is settled

== Honours ==
- Surrey Cup winners (8): 1976, 1977, 1978, 1979, 1994, 1996, 2011, 2012
- London Division 2 South champions: 1993–94
- London Division 1 champions: 1996–97
- National League 2 South champions: 1999–00, 2021–22
- National League 1 (formerly National League 2) champions (2): 2006–07, 2009–10
- National League 2 East champions: 2023–24

== Notable former players ==
- Neil Hallett - scored 1,301 points for Esher in all competitions between 2004–10 to become one of the most prolific points scorer in tier 3 history. Also capped by the Barbarians and England Counties XV as well as captaining Surrey.
- Ladislav Vondrasek - captain of the Czech Republic national team played for Esher between 2005–07.
