= Chobham Rugby =

English rugby union club, based in Chobham, Surrey

- Full name: Chobham Rugby Football Club
- Union: Surrey RFU
- Founded: 1967; 59 years ago
- Location: Chobham, Surrey, England
- Ground: Fowlers Wells
- League: Regional 2 South Central
- 2025–26: 9th

Chobham Rugby Football Club; founded in 1967, is a community rugby union club run by volunteers and based at Fowlers Wells in Chobham, Surrey. Chobham RFC has more than 2000 members with players in senior (men and women), boys and girls minis and juniors, walking and touch rugby teams participating in a full annual programme of fixtures; including friendly games, leagues and festivals. They also run a Mixed Ability Team – The Surrey Chargers. The 1st XV team participates in Regional 2 South Central; the sixth tier of the English rugby union system, having won Counties 1 Surrey/Sussex in 2022–23. Their highest league position finish was second in London 1 in 2014–15; tier six.

== Club colours ==
Scarlet and gold have been part of the club's playing strip for many years and taken from the Courage Brewery which helped found the club in 1967. The shirt and shorts mainly dark blue.

== Club badge ==
Martin Cutler, a playing member, designed the club badge in the mid-70s. The design was submitted to and reviewed by the committee of the College of Arms and so any replica should adhere strictly to the original registered description. Emblems on the club badge embody the club's strong local and historical links with Chobham:

- The cannon represents the gun on the Green in Chobham High Street. The original cannon was presented to the village by Queen Victoria following a review of her troops on Chobham Common to celebrate her Jubilee. The original cannon was requisitioned during WW2 and melted down. After the war the village of Chobham replaced it with the present day replica.
- The four horse shoes is the sign of the Four Horse Shoes pub on Windsor Road where the idea of a rugby club in Chobham was first discussed by the founder members.
- The trees were a noted landmark on Chobham Common, known as Chobham Clump.

== Teams ==
Chobham RFC Senior Rugby teams:

- 1st XV – play in Regional 2 Thames (level 6) RFU League.
- 2nd XV (Cannons) – play in Surrey Championship ( level 9 ) and with the 1st XV form part of our performance squad.
- 3rd XV (Crusaders/Martyrs) – play in Surrey Combination.
- Women's 1st XV – formed in 2019, they play in Women's NC 1 South East (North)

Chobham RFC Junior Rugby teams: Under 12's – Under 18's

Chobham RFC Minis Rugby teams: Under 4's – Under 11's

Girls Rugby Under 4's – U 18's girls

Mixed Ability Rugby: The Surrey Chargers – inclusive rugby for those with learning/physical disability and able bodied team mates.

== Honours ==
- Surrey Shield winners: 2000
- RFU London 2 South West – level 7 champions (2): 2006–07, 2012–13
- Surrey Trophy winners (4): 2013, 2017, 2018 and 2019
- RFU Counties 1 Surrey/Sussex – level 7 winners: 2023
