= Old Blues RFC =

English rugby union club

(England) Old Blues RFC
- Full name: Old Blues Rugby Football Club
- Union: Surrey RFU
- Founded: 1873
- Location: Motspur Park, Merton, London
- Ground: Dornan Fields
- President: Andrew ‘God’ Cosedge
- Coach(es): Ed Marsh and Terangi Maeva
- Captain: Joseph Ede
- Most caps: Dan Harding
- League: Surrey 2
- 2021-2022: 2nd
Team kit

Official website
- www.oldbluesrfc.com

Founded in 1873, Old Blues RFC is an English rugby union club. As of the 2002-23 season the 1st XV competes in RFU Surrey 2 and the 2nd XV competes in Surrey Combination 1 North. Both sides play home matches in Motspur Park, South West London.

The club welcomes players from all over London and Surrey operating three senior teams during the season and a Vets (35+) team on select weekends. During the off season the club tours annually and enters several 7's tournaments in the Surrey and South London area.

The Old Blues added new playing and social facilities, including a balcony overlooking the pitches completed in 2022. The organization is seeking to expand its membership and facilities.

Training is on Wednesdays 19:30 - 21:00. With regular guest coaches from across professional game.

== History ==
Originally composed of former pupils of Christ's Hospital (known as "Old Blues"), Old Blues Rugby was founded two years after the Rugby Football Union itself and the year after the very first Oxford University vs. Cambridge University Varsity Match was played. This makes the Club one of the oldest clubs in the World. The first match was played in November 1873 against the Christ's Hospital 1st XV, on a field in Palmer's Green. The School Won.

== Club honours ==
- Surrey 1 champions: 1989–90
- London 3 South West champions: 1990–91
- Surrey 3 champions: 2008–09
- Surrey Bowl winners: 2009
- Surrey 2 champions (2): 2009–10, 2016–17
