= Molesey Road =

Rugby union stadium in Hersham, England

Molesey Road Stadium
- Interactive map of Molesey Road Stadium
- Full name: Molesey Road Stadium
- Location: Hersham, Surrey
- Coordinates: 51°22′50.86″N 0°23′22.45″W
- Capacity: 3,500 (1,200 seated)
- Surface: grass
- Acreage: 23

Construction
- Opened: 1940s

Tenant
- Esher RFC

Molesey Road Stadium is a rugby union stadium in Hersham, Surrey, that is home to Esher RFC. The stadium contains a 1,200 seater main stand to the west of the pitch and a clubhouse in the south-east corner. The grounds also contain two practice pitches.

The ground also held a Rugby League Super League match on Thursday 28 March 2013, when the London Broncos were forced to move their game against Catalans Dragons there due to their usual home stadium Twickenham Stoop being damaged during their 18–18 draw with Hull F.C. the previous Saturday. The match ended in a 30–24 victory to Catalans.

RFU Championship side London Scottish planned to move to Molesey Road for at least two seasons from the 2021–22 season. However they later announced they would remain at Richmond Athletic Ground for the 2021–22 season and the deal was put on hold.
