= Hersham =

Village in Surrey, England

Coordinates: 51.3681°N 0.4008°W

- Location within Surrey
- Area: 10.29 km^{2} (3.97 sq mi)
- Population: 12,414 (2011 census)
  - Density: 1,206/km^{2} (3,120/sq mi)
- OS grid reference: TQ114641
- Civil parish: n/a
- District: Elmbridge
- Shire county: Surrey
- Region: South East
- Country: England
- Sovereign state: United Kingdom
- Post town: WALTON-ON-THAMES
- Postcode district: KT12
- Dialling code: 01932 and 01372
- Police: Surrey
- Fire: Surrey
- Ambulance: South East Coast
- UK Parliament: Esher and Walton

Hersham is a suburban village in Surrey, within the M25 and the Greater London Built-up Area. It has a mixture of low and high rise housing and has four technology/trading estates. Hersham is contiguous with Walton-on-Thames, its post town, to the north and northwest, and with Esher to the east.

Hersham is served by Hersham and Walton-on-Thames railway stations with a minimum of two trains per hour and differing types of services on the South West Main Line.

Two golf courses are within its bounds, Burhill Golf Club and Hersham Village Golf Club; considerable other land is wooded, used for mixed farming or Esher Rugby Club, (Note: Although based in Esher between 1923 and approximately 1939, Esher RFC have occupied land in Hersham since this date and expanded this to 23 acres (9.3 ha) and a 1,200 seater stand main pitch.) much of which is Metropolitan Green Belt.

== History ==
According to Hersham in Surrey:

Hersham began as a strip of woodland beside the River Mole. It was occupied by pre-historic folk whose flint instruments have been found in large numbers beside the River on Southwood Manor Farm (Note: The artefact-rich manor is at Burhill Road KT12 4BJ). These date mostly from the mesolithic period. Somewhere around 200 B.C. a huge defensive earthwork was erected on top of St George's Hill (ecclesiastically in Hersham, but in Weybridge post town), probably as a refuge camp against invaders coming up the Thames Valley.

That this could have been constructed at all indicates a fairly large population in the district, a chieftain of some sort, organised labour and a desperate perhaps recurring danger. Bronze and Iron Age burials have been found on the slopes of the hill which was clearly a feature of some importance in ancient times.

The Anglo-Saxons may have been the first permanent settlers here; they gave the name to the place and no older remains of actual dwellings in areas not mentioned above have been found. In the 12th century it was written Haverichesham suggesting Haeferick's hamlet or river bend settlement. By contraction the name become Haverisham, Haversham, (Note: Will of Dame Dorothye Edmondes, widow of Sir Christopher Edmondes, of 'Est Moulsey, Surrey', line 39 of her registered will; National Archives; PROB 11, proved 21 Sept 1615: 'And the lease of the Coppice called the Hurst Coppice, lying & being in Haversham, in the parish of Waltoun, in the said county' (spelling modernized)) Harsham or Hersham before finally settling only on the latter.

Hersham's first chapel of ease (Holy Trinity church, which was demolished in 1889 having been superseded) was built of yellow brick in Anglo-Norman style in 1839. Similarly congregationalists had a Round Chapel which existed from 1844 until 1961, the year in which the single dual carriageway in Hersham was created, and enabling its construction.

Instead of merely (for vestry and property owning matters such as poor relief, road maintenance, manorial ownership, land tax and tithes) being the southern hamlet of Walton, Hersham became an ecclesiastical parish in 1851. The dividing line was what then officially termed the "London and South Western Railway line" and all borders remain almost unchanged by later local government and ecclesiastical parish decisions. The present Anglican church of St. Peter was built by Mr. J. L. Pearson, R.A., in 1887 on a site was given by Lieut. Col. Terry of Burvale, Hersham. It is of brick and stone in 13th-century style, has a nave and aisles, five arcades, chancel, transepts, and a western tower and spire.

Hersham's industrial history includes companies such as ABC Motors, Air Products, Faulkners, Hackbridge & Hewittick and Vickers-Armstrongs all having factories in the village during the last century. In 1929 an aeroplane designed by Anthony Fletcher was constructed in the village by ABC Motors. Designed by Anthony Fletcher and fitted with an ABC Scorpion aero engine, this was test flown from nearby Brooklands and had could have been built in quantity but became a victim of the economic depression of 1929–1932. Other specialist Hersham firms include coachbuilders Compton & Herman Ltd based in Molesey Road in the 1920s before being renamed Compton Motor Body Builders and later moving first to Kingston and then to New Malden.

In World War II, in a daylight raid on 4 September 1940, German bombers successfully attacked the Vickers aircraft factory at Brooklands killing nearly 90 people. Four of the victims were never identified but buried in Hersham's Burvale Cemetery and another Vickers worker, 36-year-old William E Hunt, was buried close by. Luftwaffe bombers also dropped various bombs on and around Hersham and six V-1 flying bombs exploded in the parish. Besides the significant contribution of ABC Motors to the British war effort with products that included auxiliary power units for Short Sunderland flying boats), Vickers-Armstrongs had four secret production sites in the village and its surrounding parish occupied the existing Ben Stanley Ltd bus depot and workshop in Burwood Road as part of its dispersed Tinsmiths Department. Known as depot 'W15', this site supplied essential sheet metal parts for Vickers Wellington and Vickers Warwick aircraft manufactured at Brooklands. The other locations were at Burhill Golf Club ('W32'- see below) plus Corbie Wood ('W86' which included both a Bellman hangar and an Air Ministry T.2 Type hangar) and Riseholme ('W63'), both located on the St George's Hill side of Seven Hills Road.

=== Moor Hall, Syklesmore or Southwood Manor ===
Hersham contained one manor alone known as Morehall alias Sylkesmore or Southwood. Mention of a court held at Hersham in 1272 by Reginald de Imworth and Matilda his wife, may indicate that he was then lord of the manor. When Henry VIII built Nonsuch Palace in Cheam as many as eighty loads of timber were obtained from Southwood, or the South Woods, for it. In 1540 he purchased from John Carleton the "manor of Morehall or Sylkesmore" in Hersham, together with lands and woods in Burwood and Hatch in Hersham. The manor remained in the possession of the Crown, and was granted by Philip II of Spain and Mary I of England to David Vincent. In 1579 Queen Elizabeth granted to Thomas Vincent "the manor, site, and demesne lands of Morehall, and the wood called Sylkesmore coppice". In the 18th century and until 1802 at least, the estate, then known as 'the manor of Southwood and Silksmore,' appears to have been held by the Frederick family.

=== Whiteley Village ===
This private retirement village, which allocates some of its accommodation to disabled poor residents, is set in a lightly undulating, elevated, wooded part of Hersham and was created from a bequest of £1m left by a London department store pioneer William Whiteley.

== Geography ==
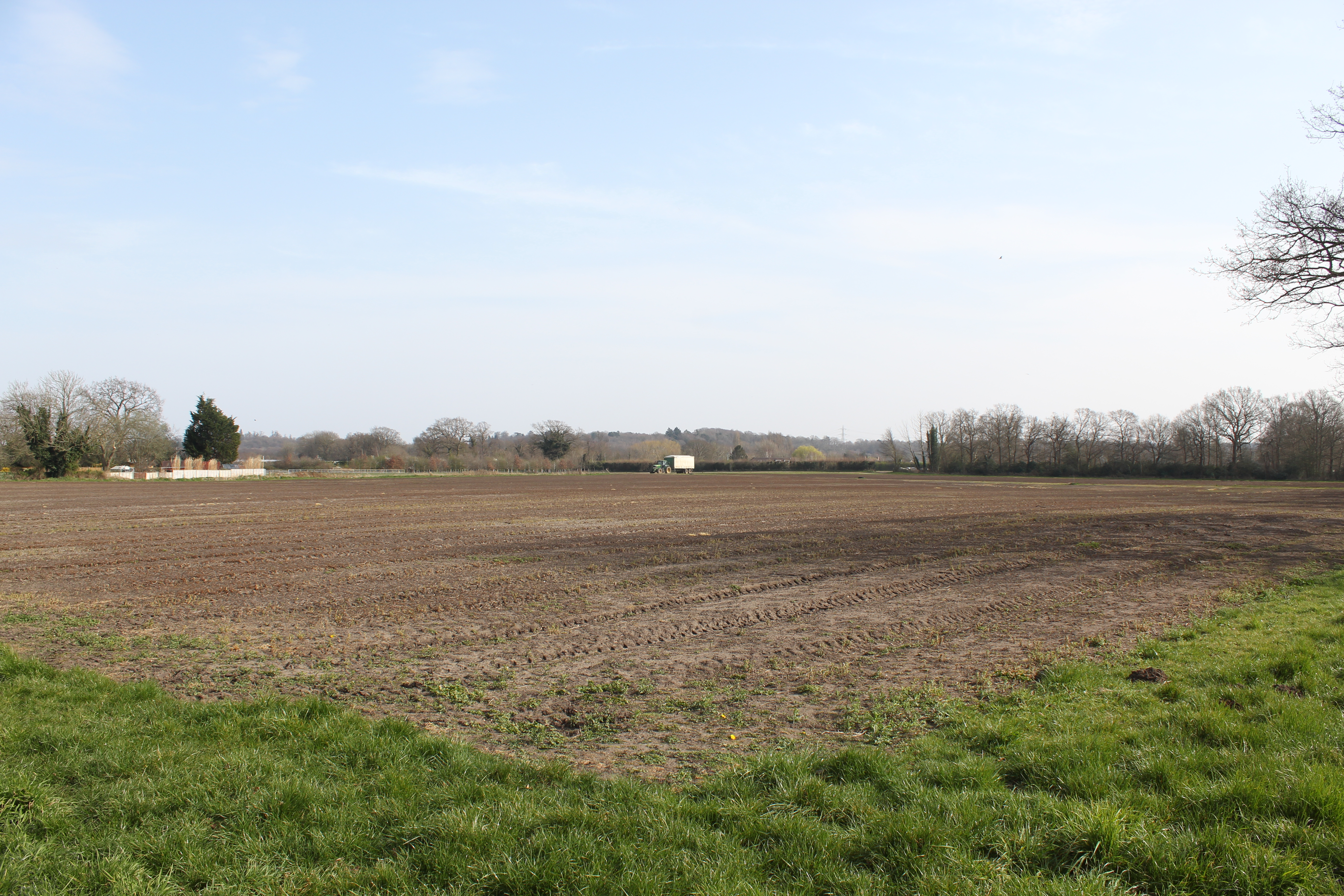
Farmland in Hersham

Hersham is in the borough of Elmbridge, in northwest Surrey and has no particular sub-localities except for Burwood Park, which alongside certain other addresses in the village is, when published for any purposes, due to its proximity to Walton-on-Thames railway station, done so under the name of Hersham's post town only, Walton on Thames. A planned community also exists in the south almost entirely for the retired, Whiteley Village.

In the nucleus of the village is Hersham Green, 3.4 acres (1.4 ha) of open space on which regular events take place throughout the year. Just across from the green is a shopping centre, consisting of multiple shops and restaurants. Within a few minutes walk of the village centre in the east are green fields and meadows alongside the River Mole and footpaths both through and by fields used for mixed farming.

The parish boundaries run from the South West Main Line railway in the north to the east and through St George's Hill in the west. Places within Hersham therefore technically include part of Saint George's Hill, all of Burwood Park and Whiteley Village.

== Notable people past and present ==
- Julie Andrews (born in Walton on Thames) speaks about her early days in Hersham in her book, Home.
- Granville Bradshaw (1887–1969), accomplished engineer and inventor, worked for ABC Motors and its earlier incarnations in the early 20th century.
- John Vincent Cain (1907–1940), aviator and minor British fraudster, lived at Hersham, where he was known as "a lavish entertainer at his home".
- Ross Davidson (b 1973), former professional footballer (defender) for Sheffield United, Chester City and Shrewsbury Town.
- Robert (Bob) C Handasyde (1908–1979), Vickers-Armstrongs test pilot and sales executive at nearby Brooklands, lived at Hershambury in Hersham in the early 1950s.
- Herbert Hoover (1874–1964), the 31st President of the United States of America, lived in Hersham briefly in 1902. Today, a blue plaque is displayed on his former home in West Grove.
- Colonel Sir William Heaton Horrocks, KCMG, CB, was buried in St Peter's Churchyard in 1941, as was his late wife, Lady Minna Horrocks in 1921.
- William Lilly, astrologer, lived in Hersham from 1652 until his death in 1681.
- Bruce McLaren (1938–1970), New Zealand-born racing driver and designer, lived in Burwood Park at the time of his death in a motoring accident when testing his new McLaren M8D at the Goodwood Motor Circuit in Sussex on 2 June 1970.
- Sarah Payne, the victim of a high-profile abduction and murder in July 2000, lived in Hersham with her family.
- John Dennis Profumo, CBE, (1915–2006), was a post-war politician who married actress Valerie Hobson (1917–1998) in 1954, but is best known for his scandalous affair with Christine Keeler in the early 1960s and also for his subsequent charity work. His and his wife's ashes were buried in his family's vault in St Peter's Churchyard and Profumo Road commemorates the family name near the village centre.
- Jimmy Pursey, lead singer with Hersham punk group Sham 69 who in 1979 celebrated Hersham in "Hersham Boys" (number six on the UK Singles Chart) — the band's biggest and most well-known hit — lived and grew up in the village.
- Lauren Rammell, member of Four of Diamonds.
- Odette Sansom GC, MBE (1912–1995), a.k.a. Odette Churchill and Odette Hallowes, was a French-born secret agent for Britain's Special Operations Executive (SOE) in France. The first woman to be awarded the George Cross by Britain, she and her third husband Geoffrey Hallowes (a former SOE officer) lived locally and are both buried in Burvale Cemetery.
- Luke Shaw, footballer for Manchester United, attended Rydens Enterprise School in Hersham.
- Hugh Trenchard, 1st Viscount Trenchard (1873–1956), Marshal of the Royal Air Force, lived at The Kings House in Burhill by 1953 and is commemorated in the village by the road name Trenchard Close.
- Tommy Trinder (1909–1989) comedian, war-time entertainer and former chairman of Fulham Football Club, lived locally and was buried in Burvale Cemetery.
- Frederick Loring Vaux (1842–1933), local resident and a significant village benefactor whose name is remembered today by Vaux Crescent off Burwood Road and Vauxmead Field opposite St Peter's Church.
- Barnes Wallis, engineer, inventor and scientist worked in the Club House at Burhill Golf Course from 1940–1946.
- Frederick Wicks (1840–1910), author and inventor, retired to the village and died there.

== Notable events ==
King George III visited Weylands farm in Hersham where he saw the first drill plough. Queen Victoria wrote in her diary how she saw her first steam train in Hersham when she was a young girl.

In more recent times the punk group Sham 69 with lead singer Jimmy Pursey, had its roots in Hersham. The band's biggest hit was Hersham Boys. Sham 69 took their name from the remnants of a piece of graffiti in the area which made reference to when Walton and Hersham Football Club secured the Athenian League title in 1969.

Due to its proximity to London and Shepperton Studios, Hersham is frequently a filming location for film and television productions including Nighty Night, The Glass, and Monty Python The second series of the TV show, Ashes to Ashes was filmed in Hersham. The Mummy was filmed in Hersham. The TV show Not Going Out is filmed in Hersham as was Never the Twain.

Hersham is also home to Britain's largest colony of parakeets, near Esher Rugby Club. This was estimated in 2004 to have consisted of around 7,000 birds.

== Education ==
Within Hersham is the mixed, secondary Three Rivers Academy. The school holds specialist Business and Enterprise College status. Its roll holds approx. 1200 students. Hersham also has three primary schools – Burhill, became primary in 2015, Bell Farm, became primary in 2014 and Cardinal Newman.

== Sport ==
=== Rugby ===
Esher RFC is a multi-pitch rugby union club in Hersham since approximately 1939 (see notes). Esher play at The Rugby Ground, 369 Molesey Road. The 1st XV play in a black-amber strip.

TV presenter John Inverdale has long been associated with the club, albeit the 2010s saw his involvement diminish.

=== Golf ===
Hersham Village Golf Club is on the south side of the village.

Hersham's large second golf club is Burhill Golf Club (with North and South courses, the latter of which has been added near Burwood Park.

== Economy ==
Four technology/trading estates exist in Hersham:

- Hersham Place Business Park
- Hersham Trading Estate
- Riverdene Industrial Estate
- Hersham Green Technology Park

A major nearby conjoined set of trading estates spans the Weybridge/Byfleet border at Brooklands and Heathrow Airport also has a range of employers, though this is across Walton-on-Thames itself and the borough of Spelthorne. Most important to the local economy is the accessibility of Central London – see Rail below, with more than 500,000 train entries and exits per annum recorded across the two stations bordering and in the village itself.

The High Street contains almost entirely only convenience and socialising stores; fashion and leisure shops are to be found less than 2 miles (3.2 km) to the north, in Walton-on-Thames. As part of the development of Hersham a new shopping centre was built in the early 1980s with a large supermarket.

== Transport ==
=== Rail ===
Hersham is served by Hersham and Walton-on-Thames railway stations with a minimum of two trains per hour even on Sundays and differing types of services on the South West Main Line. Fast trains stopping at Walton-on-Thames reach London Waterloo within 30 minutes.

=== Roads ===
Junction 10 of the M25 is four miles away. A-roads and dual carriageways connect neighbouring (but not contiguous) Esher and the almost bordering towns of Weybridge and Cobham, across a narrow strip of Walton on Thames.

== Demography and housing ==
2011 Census Homes
| Output area | Detached | Semi-detached | Terraced | Flats and apartments | Caravans/temporary/mobile homes | Shared between households |
|---|---|---|---|---|---|---|
| Hersham North (ward) | 497 | 1,084 | 436 | 451 | 1 | 0 |
| Hersham South (ward) | 973 | 928 | 348 | 405 | 10 | 0 |

The average level of accommodation in the region composed of detached houses was 28%, the average that was apartments was 22.6%.

| Output area | Population | Households | % Owned outright | % Owned with a loan | hectares |
|---|---|---|---|---|---|
| Hersham North (ward) | 5,992 | 2,469 | 27 | 41 | 230 |
| Hersham South (ward) | 6,422 | 2,664 | 35 | 35 | 799 |

The proportion of households in the settlement who owned their home outright compares to the regional average of 35.1%. The proportion who owned their home with a loan compares to the regional average of 32.5%. The remaining % is made up of rented dwellings (plus a negligible % of households living rent-free).
