= Walton-on-Thames railway station =

Railway station in Surrey, England

Walton-on-Thames
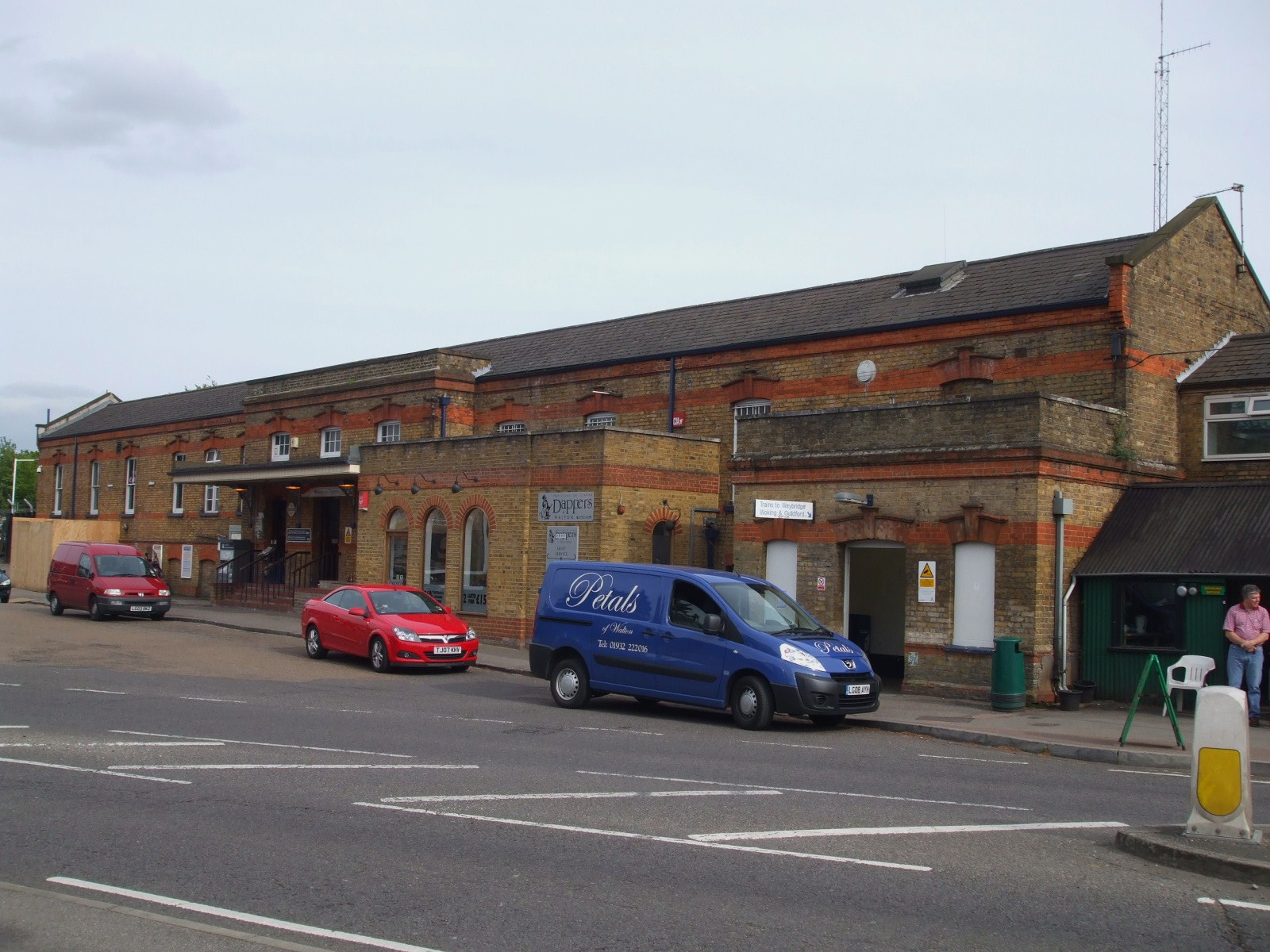

General information
- Location: Walton-on-Thames, Elmbridge; England
- Coordinates: 51°22′22″N 0°24′51″W
- Grid reference: TQ104649
- Managed by: South Western Railway
- Platforms: 4

Other information
- Station code: WAL
- Classification: DfT category C2

History
- Opened: 21 May 1838

Passengers
- 2020/21: ▼0.540 million
- 2021/22: ▲1.542 million
- 2022/23: ▲2.035 million
- 2023/24: ▲2.264 million
- 2024/25: ▲2.426 million
Location
Notes
- Passenger statistics from the Office of Rail and Road

Walton-on-Thames railway station (Note: Some signs in the station use no hyphenation in the spelling: Walton on Thames) is at the southern edge of the town of Walton-on-Thames in Surrey, England and borders Burwood Park, Hersham. It is 17 miles 6 chains (27.5 km) from London Waterloo and is situated between Hersham and Weybridge.

The station's main entrance borders the Ashley Park area of the largely residential town and features a taxi rank and pick-up apron. The station opened as Walton for Hersham in 1838 and today has rush hour services two stops from central London.

Only the two outer platforms on the slow lines are currently used. The central island platform is disused.

== Services ==
Services from Walton-on-Thames are split into rush hour (Monday - Friday, early mornings and evenings), off peak (Monday - Friday, Saturday) and Sunday.

=== Rush hour ===
- 4 trains per hour (tph) to London Waterloo, stopping to Surbiton then, non stop to London Waterloo.
- 2tph to Woking
- 2tph to Basingstoke

Rush hour services to London Waterloo only operate in the morning, and services to Woking and Guildford operate in the evening rush hour with one service running semi fast to Basingstoke.

=== Off peak ===
- 2tph to London Waterloo, stopping service
- 2tph to London Waterloo, semi fast
- 2tph to Woking, stopping service
- 2tph to Basingstoke, semi fast to Woking then stopping to Basingstoke

There are also three direct trains to Portsmouth Harbour two via Basingstoke one via Guildford per day, Mon - Sat, and one direct train to Branksome in the early morning. In the evening there are two services from Portsmouth Harbour via Basingstoke and one from Weymouth to Walton on Thames.

=== Sundays ===
- 2tph to London Waterloo, stopping service
- 1tph to London Waterloo, semi fast
- 2tph to Guildford, stopping service
- 1tph to Woking semi fast where the train divides to either Basingstoke or Alton

== History ==
The station first operated in 1838, and was one of the first stations on the South West Main Line, between Ditton Marsh (now Esher) and Weybridge. The first services ran from Nine Elms to Woking Common (now Woking).

The middle platforms were abandoned when slower services only used the outer tracks, leaving the inside tracks for non stop services to Woking.

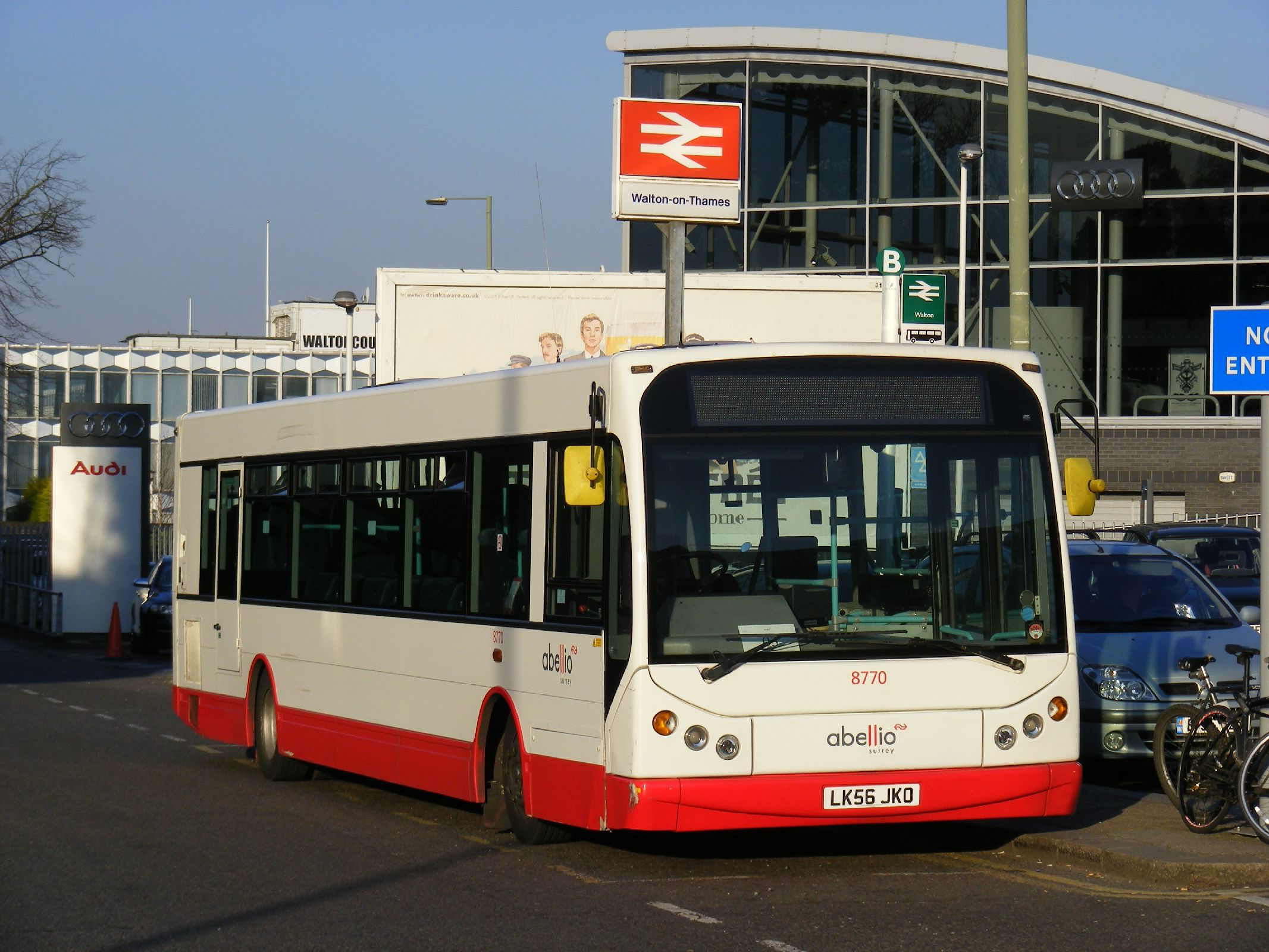
Abellio Surrey bus outside the station

== Ticket gates and accessibility ==
Walton-on-Thames railway station was one of the first stations selected by South West Trains to have automatic ticket gates installed at all of the exits to the station. These were installed and in operation on 25 June 2009. There were also smartcard validators installed, intended (in the future) for use when the barriers are unattended and open. As of June 2018, there was a digital barcode scanner installed for mobile ticketing on Platform 1.

Ramps were installed on 31 October 2009, making both platforms accessible to all from street level. Access from the Ashley Park / ticket office side of the station to the Burwood Park side requires use of the railway-owned subway which is via a short flight of steps or a detour of more than 600 m (2,000 ft) by road.

This station has a taxi rank and bus stops. Bus routes 458 and 555 serve the station, both connecting passengers to the town centre.

In 2016, a petition was started by a local resident calling for London fare zone 6 to be extended to include this station, as well as Esher and Hersham stations. In December 2022, Elmbridge Borough Council reaffirmed its commitment to lobby for Walton-on-Thames to be included in Zone 6.

A £6M station improvement programme, funded by the Department for Transport under the "Access for All" scheme, began in October 2022. Part of the project included the installation of a new footbridge connecting the two in-use platforms. The work was completed in August 2024.

== Immediate surroundings ==
The station is just north of the approximate midpoint of the medieval parish boundaries of Walton. Today it is on the southern boundary of Walton and the northern boundary of Hersham, and more particularly between two large-plot, neighbourhoods of detached homes, Burwood Park and Ashley Park. These are predominantly low rise and have avenues and greens; they are not a conservation area with no buildings which pre-date 1750 but the former has one or two listed buildings for architecture. The commercial centre of Walton is 0.6 miles (0.97 km) north.

== Notes ==
Preceding station	National Rail	Following station
Hersham	South Western Railway; Waterloo to Woking	Weybridge
Surbiton	South Western Railway; Waterloo to Basingstoke	Weybridge
