= James Fullerton (courtier) =

Scottish courtier and politician (c. 1563–1631)

Sir James Fullerton or Fullarton (c. 1563 – 7 January 1631) was a Scottish courtier and politician during the reigns of James I of England and Charles I.

== Career ==
He was probably the son of John Fullerton, and is thought to have been educated either by Andrew Melville at the University of St Andrews or at Glasgow University. Fullerton acted as a diplomat or envoy for James VI of Scotland. James VI is said to have sent a sapphire ring to Philadelphia Scrope, a lady in waiting to Elizabeth I, with Sir James Fullerton to be used as a token of Elizabeth's death. The ring was duly carried back to Scotland by Robert Carey. According to the historian Thomas Birch, Fullerton was involved with James Hamilton in the secret correspondence of James VI, carrying letters from English courtiers who worshipped James "as the rising sun". Although evidence for Fullerton's early career may be doubtful and slight, James VI certainly bought diamond rings for the use of his diplomats, including one for David Foulis in July 1595, "to be employed as we have given direction" as a gift in London.

Known as "a Scotch gentleman of great learning and very great worth", in 1611 Fullerton was proposed for a leading role in the household of Charles I of England (then known as the Duke of York), and summoned from Dublin where he is said to have been involved in the education of James Ussher at Dublin Free School, and was Clerk of the Cheque of the Army in Ireland, and in 1610 a commissioner at the conference of deputies for the Plantation of Ulster. Prince Henry supported his appointment, but the role was given to Robert Carey after the Earl of Suffolk spoke to the King in his favour. Fullerton was given other employments, and was a surveyor of Prince Henry's estates, valuing the income from his lands.

Fullerton was appointed to serve Prince Charles in other roles in 1611, as Gentleman of the Bedchamber and Keeper of the Privy Purse, and he was Surveyor of the Prince's Lands (in the North) from 1611 to 1616, When Prince Henry died in 1612, Fullerton briefly held another courtier, Sir Robert Kerr, under arrest when Kerr and Henry Gibb were suspected of disposing of the Prince's papers.

Fullerton was involved in appointments to the household of Prince Charles in 1613 including the retention of many old servants of Henry, and the appointment of George Carleton as a tutor and chaplain. He was made Groom of the Stool in 1616, when Charles became Prince of Wales, a position he retained until his death when Charles became king.

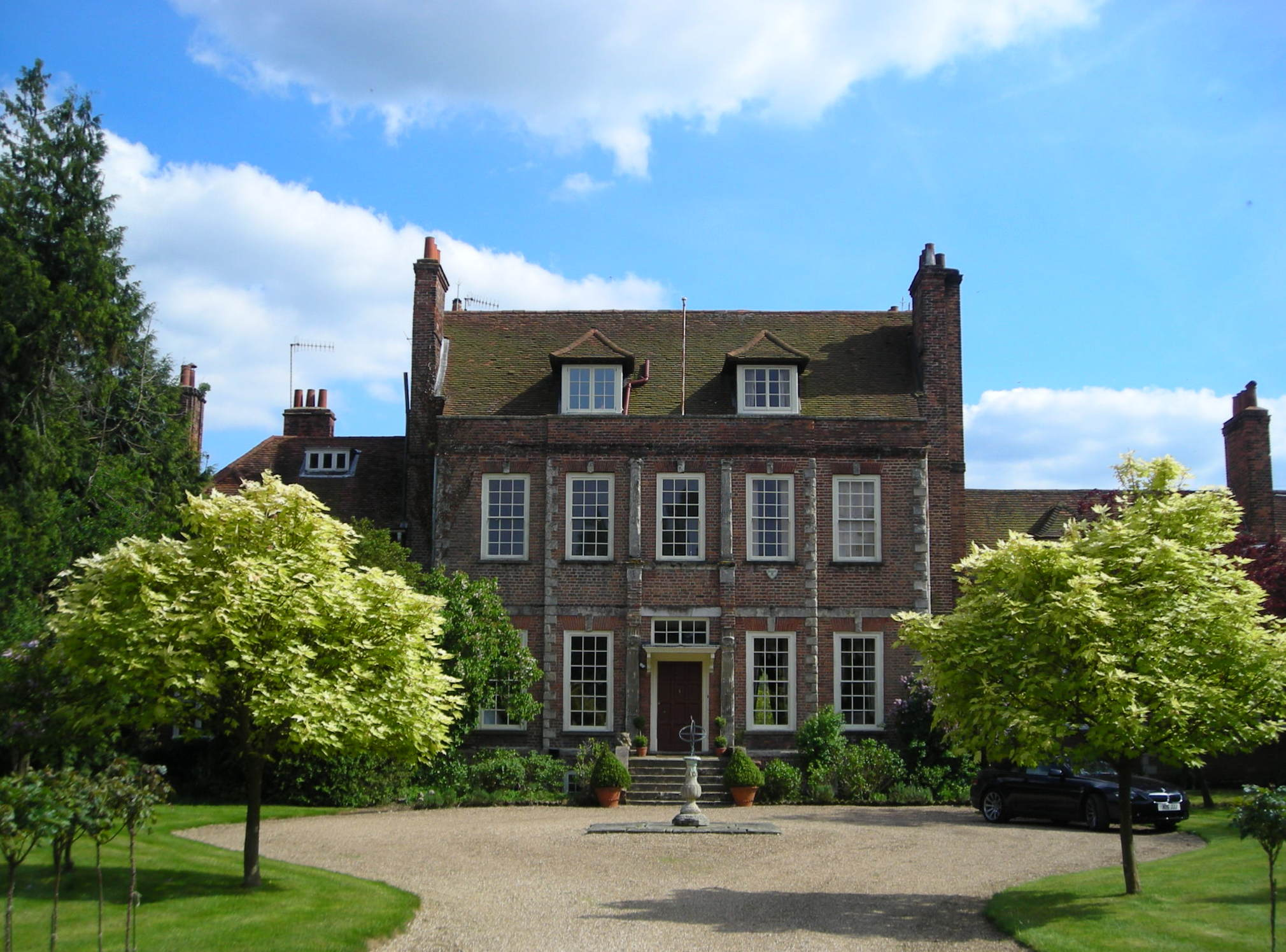
Fullerton is said to have completed a phase of building work at Byfleet Manor

A council for the administration of Charles's estates was formed and Fullerton was sworn in with others on 1 March 1617. Fullerton's signature frequently appears on surviving documents, indicating he regularly attended meetings and was involved in much of council's business. In 1623, he helped select jewels for Lord Compton to carry to Spain during the "Spanish Match". He competed unsuccessfully for the post of Provost of Eton after the death of Thomas Murray.

In 1625, he was elected to Parliament for St Mawes constituency. During the Parliament, he worked on a bill to permit coal mining in Macclesfield, and worked on a religious address and a bill to prevent secret inquisitions. He was ordered to present Parliament's protestations to King Charles setting out their position against further financial 'supply'.

He was a fellow of Trinity College Dublin, one of the first two created at its establishment. He was appointed to represent Portsmouth in 1626. Later he served as ambassador to France.

A royal gift of lands at Gillingham, Dorset, held jointly with a courtier colleague George Kirke, proved troublesome when tenants protested at their enclosures and improvements.

In 1616, at Abbots Langley, he married Magdalene Clerk Bruce, Baroness Kinloss, widow of Edward Bruce, 1st Lord Kinloss, a daughter of a Provost of Edinburgh, Alexander Clark of Balbirnie.

He died in December 1630 or January 1631. He left his property, including leases of lead mines, and the manor of Byfleet to his wife. The antiquarian John Aubrey wrote that Fullerton completed a house at Byfleet which Anne of Denmark had started to build, a "noble house of brick".

Fullerton was buried in Westminster Abbey.

Parliament of England
| Preceded by John Arundell; William Hockmere | Member of Parliament for St Mawes; 1625; With: Nathaniel Tomkins May–July 1625 | Succeeded by Sir Henry Carey; William Carr |
| Preceded by Sir Benjamin Rudyerd; Sir Daniel Norton | Member of Parliament for Portsmouth; 1626–1628; With: Thomas Whatman | Succeeded by William Towerson; Owen Jennens |
