= Burwood Park =

Private housing estate in Surrey, England

Coordinates: 51.339°N 0.426°W

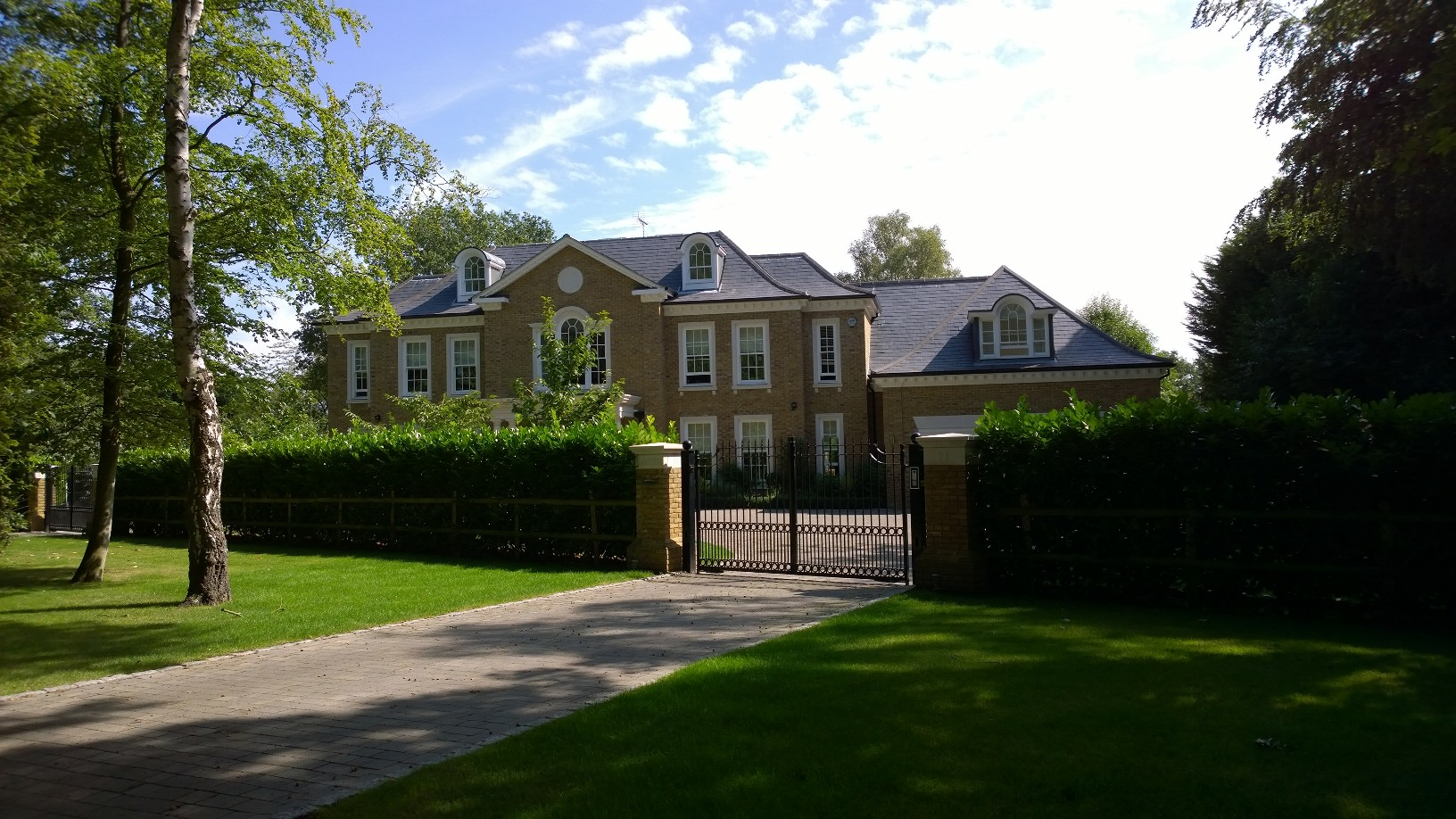
Gated neo-Georgian house in Burwood Park with private road association-managed verges and roads.

Burwood Park is a historic private estate located in Hersham, Surrey, England. Spanning six miles of road, Burwood Park is situated in a former deer park that belonged to Henry VIII. The 360 acre estate is known both for its extensive wildlife — more than 150 species of birds and mammals have been recorded in the woods and parkland around its lakes and communal areas —.as well as the high level of security and privacy provided to its residents; it is one of the few remaining residential areas in the United Kingdom never to have been filmed by Google Streetview.

Acquired by Henry Askew in 1877, the first new houses in Burwood Park were constructed in the 1920s, with major new developments arriving in the following decade. It soon became a popular destination for the British elite, owing to its semi-rural feel and commutable distance to London.

Comprising 384 properties by 2021, Burwood Park is of a geometric design within an approximate semicircle and many of its roads have entrances with automatic bollards or security buildings.

== History ==
=== Early history ===
King Henry VIII purchased what is now Burwood Park from John Carleton in 1540. He ordered Burwood as with the Ashley and Oatlands manors to be converted to a deer park or woodland for him to enjoy.

Following the death of Henry VIII in 1547 the estate passed into private hands. In 1739 the first of the Frederick baronets acquired it – Burwood Park mansion in land west of the former Burwood House (manor house) was built by Sir John Frederick (1708–1783), a wealthy city merchant and Lord Mayor of London. Frederick developed the land around the house and transformed two old gravel pits into ornamental lakes, today known as Broadwater Lake and Heart Pond. Tall Scots pine trees were planted around the lakes.

In 1877 Henry Askew purchased the estate at auction. Two of his daughters arranged for a black painted corrugated iron fence to be erected all around the Park and, according to local residents, lived in the mansion as virtual recluses. The estate "deteriorated rapidly" under the indifferent ownership of the Askew family and soon became overgrown.

=== Modern history ===
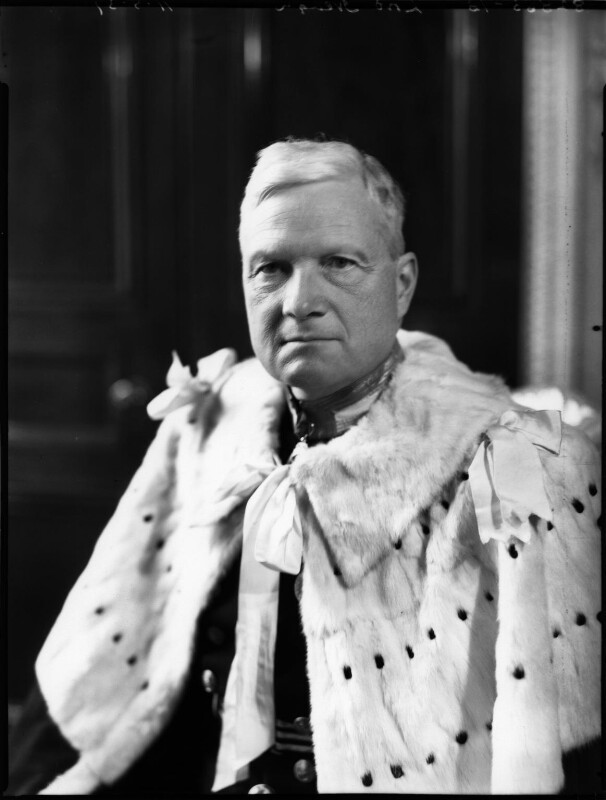
Rupert Guinness, 2nd Earl of Iveagh

The last Askew sister died in 1927 and Burwood Park was purchased by the Burhill Estates Company of Edward Guinness, 1st Earl of Iveagh. His son Rupert, the 2nd Earl, took responsibility for the development of the estate and began selling private plots. (Note: The development of Burwood Park as a residential estate by Lord Iveagh coincided with similar estate development at St George's Hill and Ashley Park, although under different ownership to Burwood Park)

Private plots could be purchased for £450 in 1927, with the cost rising to £550 by 1930. The first houses on the park were developed in the 1930s on Eriswell Road, Onslow Road, Cranley Road, Broadwater Road and Chargate Close. The rest of the park at this time was open woodland.

Plots continued to be sold post-war, with some of the original houses also changing hands. Burwood Park developed its remaining land over the following decades. To fully exploit the available space, new roads were narrower and plots smaller than the originals. The 1990s saw a switch to infill development, with older plots split and replaced with two houses; the residents association estimate this will be an "ongoing process" because a large portion of the current stock has re-development potential.

In 1955 the Guinness family allowed a property on the estate to be converted into a school for deaf boys. Despite going coeducational, the school was forced to shut in 1996 due to declining numbers, with the remaining pupils transferring to Ovingdean Hall School near Brighton. (Note: The Burwood Park Foundation, a charity supporting deaf children, was formed with residual funds from the sale of the school buildings.)

== Profile ==
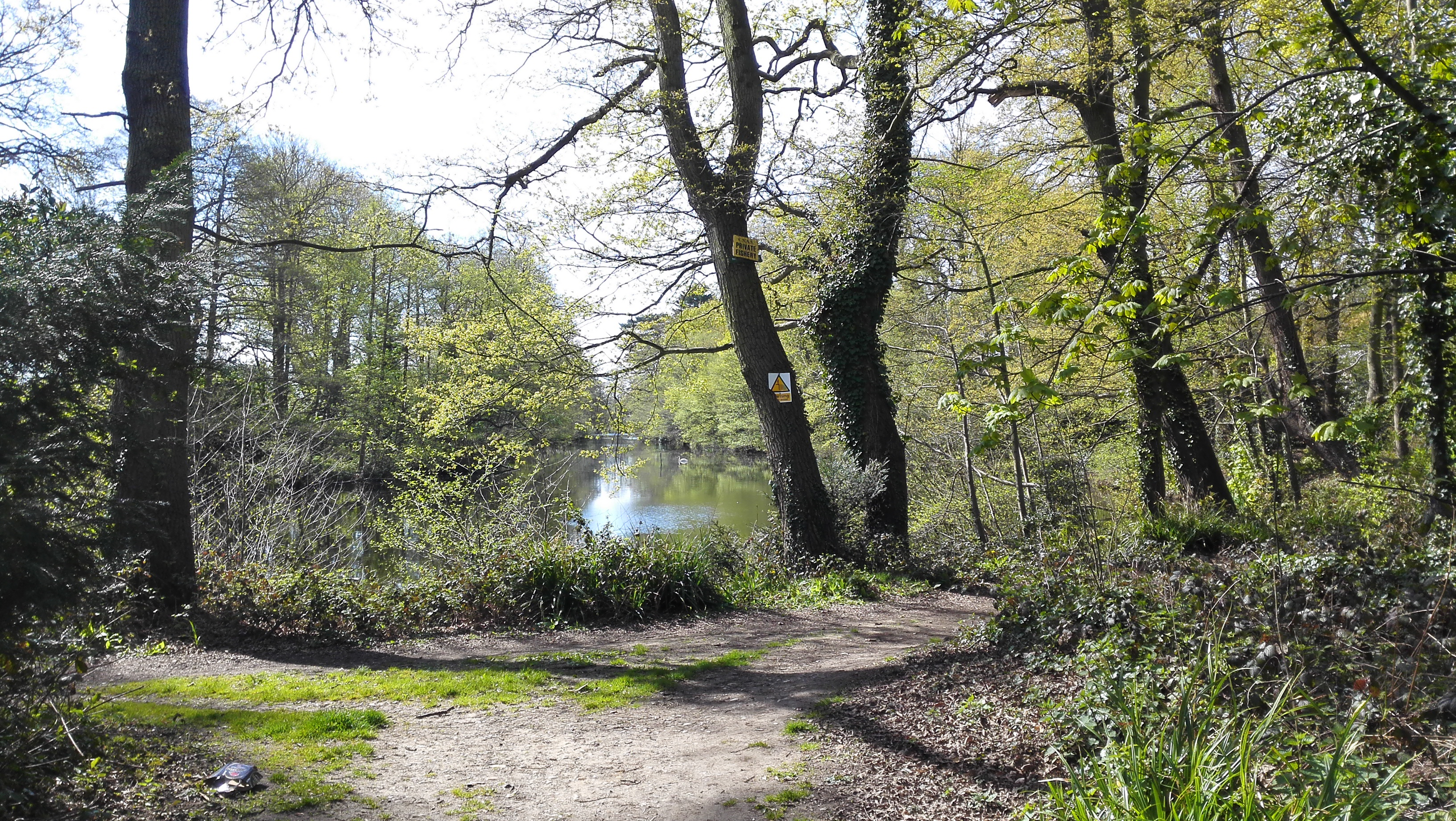
Broadwater lake

Burwood Park is one of a number of private gated estates in Surrey, among them the Wentworth Estate and St. George's Hill, known for social exclusivity and high-net-worth residents. House prices in Burwood Park typically start from around £2m and have been stimulated in recent years because of an ongoing trend for wealthy homeowners to sell London property and decamp to Surrey.

Burwood Park, along with neighbouring Ashley Park, have been described as "the most exclusive addresses" in the Walton-on-Thames area. Nevertheless, a 2014 article in The Times noted it was not part of the 'first tier' of Surrey estates in general — a distinction belonging to Wentworth and St George's Hill — and formed part of a second group where cost per square foot is lower.

In 2013, two streets on the estate, Broadwater Close and Chargate Close, were revealed to be among the most expensive places in the country to buy property.

=== Security ===
Burwood Park has four entrances: a main entrance and three which are restricted to residents only. The main entrance has automatic number-plate recognition. In 2020, a park warden was appointed to patrol the estate and a security hut was also installed at the main entrance.

Having a property "double-gated" — which refers to the practice of installing a separate gate and security system on an individual home, in addition to the security of the wider estate — is against the covenants. Nevertheless, many residents own properties with their own gates, achieved through bypassing the residents association and appealing directly to the local council. This behaviour has proved divisive within the community.

=== Location and transport ===
Burwood Park is in the borough of Elmbridge, Surrey, and is bordered by a public road to its west, with Hersham to the immediate east, and by Burhill Golf Course to the south. The Ashley Park estate lies to the north of Burwood Park.

Within a third of a mile (500 metres) is Walton-on-Thames railway station which offers fast (non-stopping) service trains to London Waterloo, Basingstoke, Woking and Surbiton. The feasibility of quick commuting is part of the appeal of the wider area. Burwood Park in particular is known to be "well-connected" yet also offer a sense of seclusion to its residents.

=== Plant and animal species ===
Over 150 species of birds and animals have been spotted within the boundaries of the estate, which also contains one of England's oldest oak trees. Residents have reported the occasional deer grazing in their gardens. Burwood Park Residents Limited was set up in 1991 to protect the park's environment and to look after members' interests.

A wildlife coordinator, a role taken up by an estate resident, is charged with the welfare of animals, both wild and domestic.

== Notable residents ==
New Zealand racing driver Bruce McLaren resided at the estate until his death in a training accident aged 32. The former publicist Max Clifford owned a property from 2006 to 2016.
