= Tarrant Tabor =

British bomber aircraft

Tabor
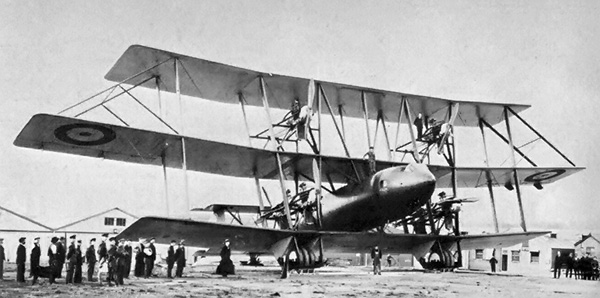

General information
- Type: Bomber
- Manufacturer: W.G Tarrant Ltd
- Designer: Walter Barling
- Primary user: RAE
- Number built: 1

History
- First flight: 26 May 1919; 107 years ago

The Tarrant Tabor was a British triplane bomber designed towards the end of the First World War and was briefly the world's largest aircraft. It crashed, with fatalities, on its first flight.

== Development ==
The Tabor was the first and only aircraft design produced by W.G Tarrant Ltd, a well-known property developer and building contractor at Byfleet, Surrey, which had been subcontracted to build aircraft components during the First World War. In late 1917 Tarrant assembled a design team, led by Walter Barling, hired from the Royal Aircraft Factory and Marcel Lobelle, hired from Martinsyde, to design a very large long-range heavy bomber, capable of bombing Berlin. Captain Percy Townley Rawlings DFC formerly of the RNAS was general manager of the department.

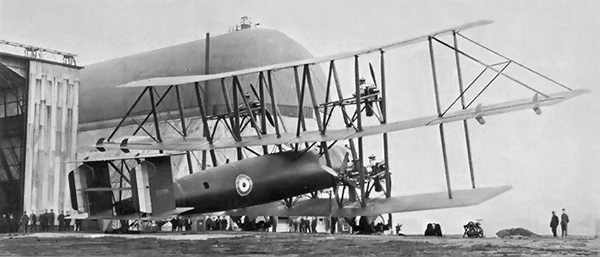
The sole Tarrant Tabor, serial F1765

Construction was primarily in wood with conventional tri-plane strut-braced wings and a monocoque fuselage built up from ply veneers. Circular Warren girders formed of wood joined with longerons formed the fuselage structure. Most of the wood construction was carried out at Byfleet.

The Tabor was originally planned as a biplane powered by four 600 hp Siddeley Tiger engines. However delays in development of the engines (Note: The Tiger would not run until 1920 and the project was cancelled) meant these would be unavailable and so the aircraft was redesigned to use six 450 hp Napier Lion engines to give a similar power/weight ratio, and a third, upper wing added.

The final design had a wingspan of over 131 ft (40 m), with the central wing of much greater span than the other two. The upper wing was 37 ft (11 m) above the ground. Four engines were mounted in push pull configuration pairs between the lower and middle wings with the other two mounted in tractor configuration between the middle and upper wings, directly above the lower pairs. The tractor engines used two-bladed propellers, the pushers four-bladed ones. Ailerons were fitted only on the middle wing, which Flight magazine commented on as possibly affecting their efficiency.

With the end of the war conversion to a passenger aircraft was planned.

The monocoque construction gave a large open space within the fuselage described as the length of a cricket pitch in Flight magazine. The pilots were situated in the nose, with a partition separating them from the engineer's station and the engine controls mounted on either side of the opening in the partition. The fuel tanks were in the top and sides of the fuselage to maintain the clear internal space.

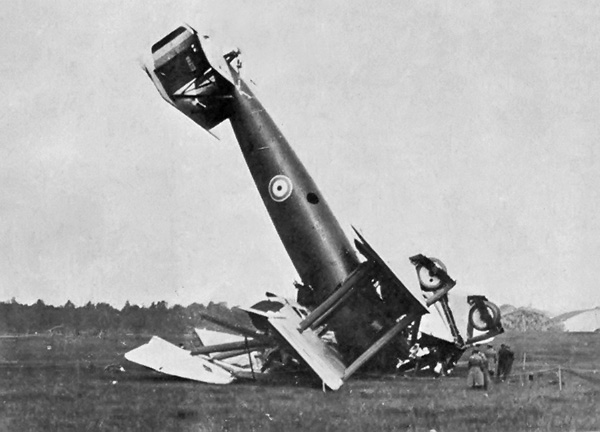
F1765 after its crash

The aircraft was built at Farnborough in a large balloon shed. Work on the aircraft had stopped at the end of the First World War, when it was no longer needed as a bomber. It was later completed with the design altered to allow it to be used as a commercial or transport aircraft.

The Admiralty Air Department was asked to check its structural strength. AAD mathematician Letitia Chitty was given this task. In her own words "Mr. Tarrant was an inspired timber merchant who dreamed of a super-Camel. It hadn't a chance. It was too big, too heavy - that wasn't its fault, but Grade A spruce had by now run out and it had to be built of American white wood (tulip wood). In my language 3,500 instead of 5,500 lb/sq in.". Tragically, her mathematical analysis was not heeded.

The Tabor's maiden flight was from the Royal Aircraft Establishment at Farnborough on 26 May 1919. Wheeled out at daybreak the Tabor, with two pilots (Captain Frederick Dunn AFC with Rawlings as his assistant pilot) and five others (Captain Wilson of the Air Ministry, Lt Adams in charge of engines (Note: Adams had flown with Rawlings in the war when Rawlings flew a Handley Page Type O and bombed the German battlecruiser Goeben at Constantinople in July 1917), superintendent of the department at the RAE Mr Grosert, and two mechanics) was taxied around the landing field in a "mile-wide circle" using only the four lower engines. Satisfied with the behaviour of the aircraft the crew decided to take-off. The tail was off the ground but it was still running on the main wheels, intermittently lifting off. When the top two engines were started the aircraft pitched forward, burying the nose into the ground and injuring all on board with the pilots severely injured. Fortunately there was no fire as someone, presumed to be one of the pilots, turned off the engines. Rawlings died after reaching hospital and Dunn died of his injuries two days later.

Later analysis suggested that the upper engines were so far above the fuselage that they forced the nose down when driven up to full power. The situation may not have been helped by the addition of 1,000 pounds (450 kg) of lead ballast in the nose against the wishes of Tarrant.

== Operators ==
United Kingdom

- Royal Aircraft Establishment

== Specifications (estimated) ==
Data from The British Bomber since 1914

General characteristics

- Crew: 6
- Capacity: 9,000 lb (4,100 kg) load as passenger aircraft
- Length: 73 ft 2 in (22.31 m)
- Wingspan: 131 ft 3 in (40.02 m)
- Height: 37 ft 3 in (11.36 m)
- Wing area: 4,950 sq ft (460 m^{2})
- Airfoil: RAF 15
- Empty weight: 24,750 lb (11,250 kg)
- Gross weight: 44,672 lb (20,305 kg)
- Fuel capacity: 10,000 lb (4,500 kg)
- Powerplant: 6 × Napier Lion W-12 water-cooled piston engine (four tractor, two pusher), 450 hp (336 kW) each

Performance

- Maximum speed: 110 mph (177 km/h, 96 kn)
- Range: 1,200 mi (1,932 km, 1,043 nmi) estimated with 10,000 lb fuel and 9,000 lb load
- Endurance: 12 hours
- Service ceiling: 13,000 ft (3,970 m)
- Time to altitude: 33 min 30 sec to 10,000 ft (3,050 m)
- Wing loading: 9.02 lb/sq ft (44.1 kg/m^{2})
- Power/mass: 0.06 hp/lb (0.099 kW/kg)

Armament

- Bombs: approximately 4,600 lb (2,100 kg) planned

== See also ==
- Witteman-Lewis XNBL-1 - a design by Barling for a similar aircraft for the US Army

== Bibliography ==
- Coles, Simon (2023). "The Tarrant Tabor: The Story of the Ill-Fatedd British Heavy Bomber`" (PDF). Journal of Aeronautical History. 4: 102–194.
- Mason, Francis K. (1994). The British Bomber since 1914. London: Putnam Aeronautical Books. ISBN 0-85177-861-5.
- Prins, François (February 2019). ""The big machine is not safe to fly"". Aeroplane. Vol. 47, no. 2. pp. 60–64. ISSN 0143-7240.
- "The Tarrant Giant Triplane". Flight. Vol. XI, no. 541. 8 May 1919. p. 592. Archived from the original on 25 October 2017.
- "The Tarrant Giant Triplane, the "Tabor"". Flight. Vol. XI, no. 542. 15 May 1919. pp. 626–632. Archived from the original on 14 January 2019.
- "The Tarrant Triplane". Flight. Vol. XI, no. 544. 29 May 1919. pp. 702–703. Archived from the original on 3 November 2012.
