= Frederick Wicks =

- Born: 23 February 1840; Stockwell, Surrey, England
- Died: 30 March 1910 (aged 70); Hersham, Surrey, England
- Occupations: Author, inventor

Frederick Wicks (23 February 1840 – 30 March 1910) was an English author and inventor, whose book The British Constitution and Government was first published in 1871 and ran to several editions. He was born in Stockwell, Surrey, the youngest son of Samuel Wicks (1790-1854), a corn dealer, & Mary Wicks (née Groves) (1797-1868).

An obituary from The Cambrian records:

"Wicks was educated at King's Collage, and began life as a journalist. In 1861 he took part in the inauguration of the first daily newspaper in Wales, the "Cambria Daily Leader." In 1863 he joined the editorial staff of the "Globe," and three years later became a member of the Gallery staff of "The Times." He left London for Glasgow in 1873 to establish the "Glasgow News," of which he subsequently became proprietor. He returned to London in 1888 to complete his invention of the rotary type-casting machine, at which he been working for many years."

In 1864 Wicks wrote of the events surrounding the trial and execution of Franz Muller.

Frederick Wicks, who in the 1870s became proprietor of the Glasgow Daily News, was in 1878 the inventor of the Wicks Rotary Typecasting Machine. It is recorded that "for many years he had been working at a machine which would cast new type so quickly and so cheaply as to do away with the old system of distribution and substitute new type every day. In 1899 his machine was practically perfect, and The Times entered into a contract with him to supply any quantity of new type every day. The difficult question of distribution was thus surmounted, and composition by machines placed on a satisfactory basis".

"Before his invention was introduced a type-casting machine which could turn out 6,000 types an hour was considered rapid; the Wicks machine produced types at the rate of 60,000 an hour, and at a very much cheaper rate than the old machines. Such rapidity and cheapness of production rendered it possible for the type to be used for printing only once and then returned straight to the melting-pot to be subsequently recast. A newspaper could thus be printed from new type every day, securing the advantage of fresh unworn letters for each issue. Mr. Wicks was also the inventor of a steel motor wheel entitled the Centipede wheel." (The Cambrian)

He was the author of several publications, including "The British Constitution and Government," and a number of novels, including Golden Lives, The Veiled Hand, and The Infant, and was a frequent correspondent of "The Times."

He retired to Hersham, Surrey, where he died on 30 March 1910, aged 70.
