= Hersham railway station =

Railway station in Surrey, England

Hersham
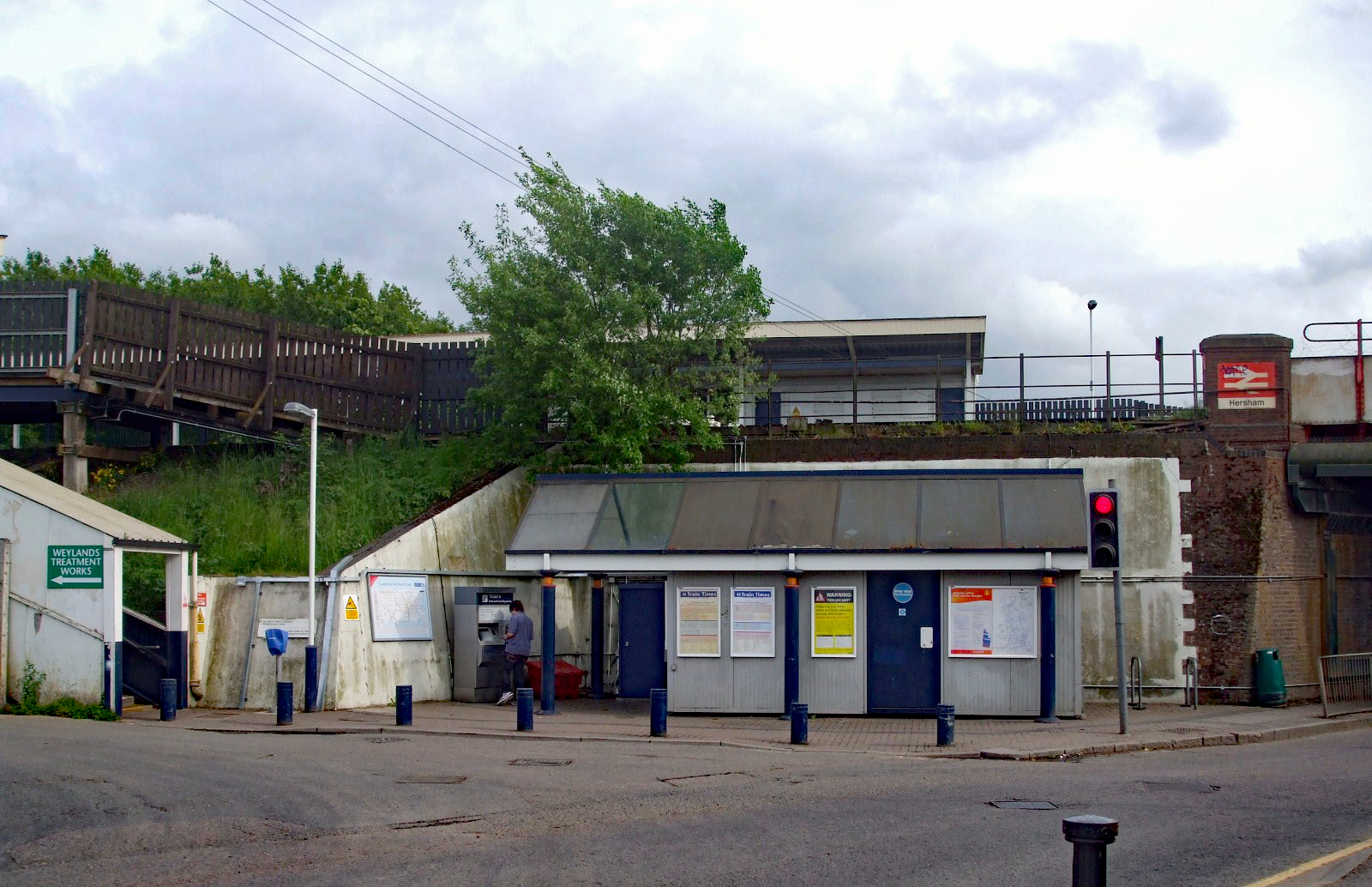

General information
- Location: Walton-on-Thames (SE part); Hersham (NE part), Elmbridge; England
- Coordinates: 51°22′36″N 0°23′23″W
- Grid reference: TQ121654
- Manager: South Western Railway
- Platforms: 2
- Tracks: 4

Other information
- Station code: HER
- Classification: DfT category D

History
- Opened: 28 September 1936

Passengers
- 2020/21: ▼0.180 million
- 2021/22: ▲0.447 million
- 2022/23: ▲0.594 million
- 2023/24: ▲0.666 million
- 2024/25: ▲0.722 million
Location
Notes
- Passenger statistics from the Office of Rail and Road

Opened on 28 September 1936, Hersham railway station is on the London to Woking line and operated by South Western Railway. The station is 0.7 miles (1.1 km) north of Hersham village centre, adjoined to one side by housing and the other by fields and a golf course. It is 15 miles 73 chains (25.6 km) from London Waterloo (Note: Railways in the United Kingdom historically are measured in miles and chains. There are 80 chains to one mile.) and is situated between Esher and Walton-on-Thames.

== Services ==
At off-peak times during weekdays are two trains per hour (tph) to London Waterloo and two tph to Woking, a large town and junction station in Surrey. During morning rush hour there are an extra two trains per hour to London Waterloo, and in the evening, south-west bound these continue to Guildford (which is also where all trains terminate on Sundays).

== Immediate surroundings ==
Entrance to the station is from either side of the railway bridge which is above street level. The station entrances are at the southern end of each platform, and at the western end (furthest from London). The station has ticket machines and an office open until 1.40 pm. The main line towards Woking and Basingstoke consists of four tracks here, but only the outer tracks have platforms, served by stopping services to/from Woking.

Bus routes 514 and 564 serve the station, stopping at nearby bus stops on Molesey Road.

It is one of two stations serving Walton on Thames and Hersham as its railway track and engineered line beneath it mark the divide between the two settlements. Adjoining to one side are housing (west) and fields with a golf course next to the River Mole (east).

== Notes ==
Preceding station	National Rail	Following station
Esher	South Western Railway; Waterloo to Woking	Walton-on-Thames
