= Walter George Tarrant =

Walter George Tarrant (8 April 1875 – 18 March 1942) was a builder born in Brockhurst in the north of the port town of Gosport, Hampshire, England. He is best known as a Surrey master builder and developer of St Georges Hill and the Wentworth Estate in Surrey.

== Biography ==
In 1895, aged 20, he set up his own building company, W G Tarrant Ltd, in the village of Byfleet, Surrey and in the early 1900s built extensively in adjoining Pyrford, West Byfleet and Woking. The company almost certainly constructed some of the first buildings at nearby Brooklands. By 1911 his premises in Byfleet covered over five acres and included workshops for joinery, wrought iron and leaded lights, a stonemason's yard, and a timber mill with drying sheds. He also owned nurseries in Addlestone and Pyrford and brickfields in Chobham and Rowlands Castle.

In 1911 he bought 964 acres (3.90 km^{2}) of Surrey scrubland from the Egertons, the family of Lord Ellesmere which he developed into the St George's Hill estate. Tarrant was subsequently responsible for constructing housing in Weybridge, Byfleet, Pyrford, Woking and also Virginia Water where he launched the Wentworth Estate in 1923.

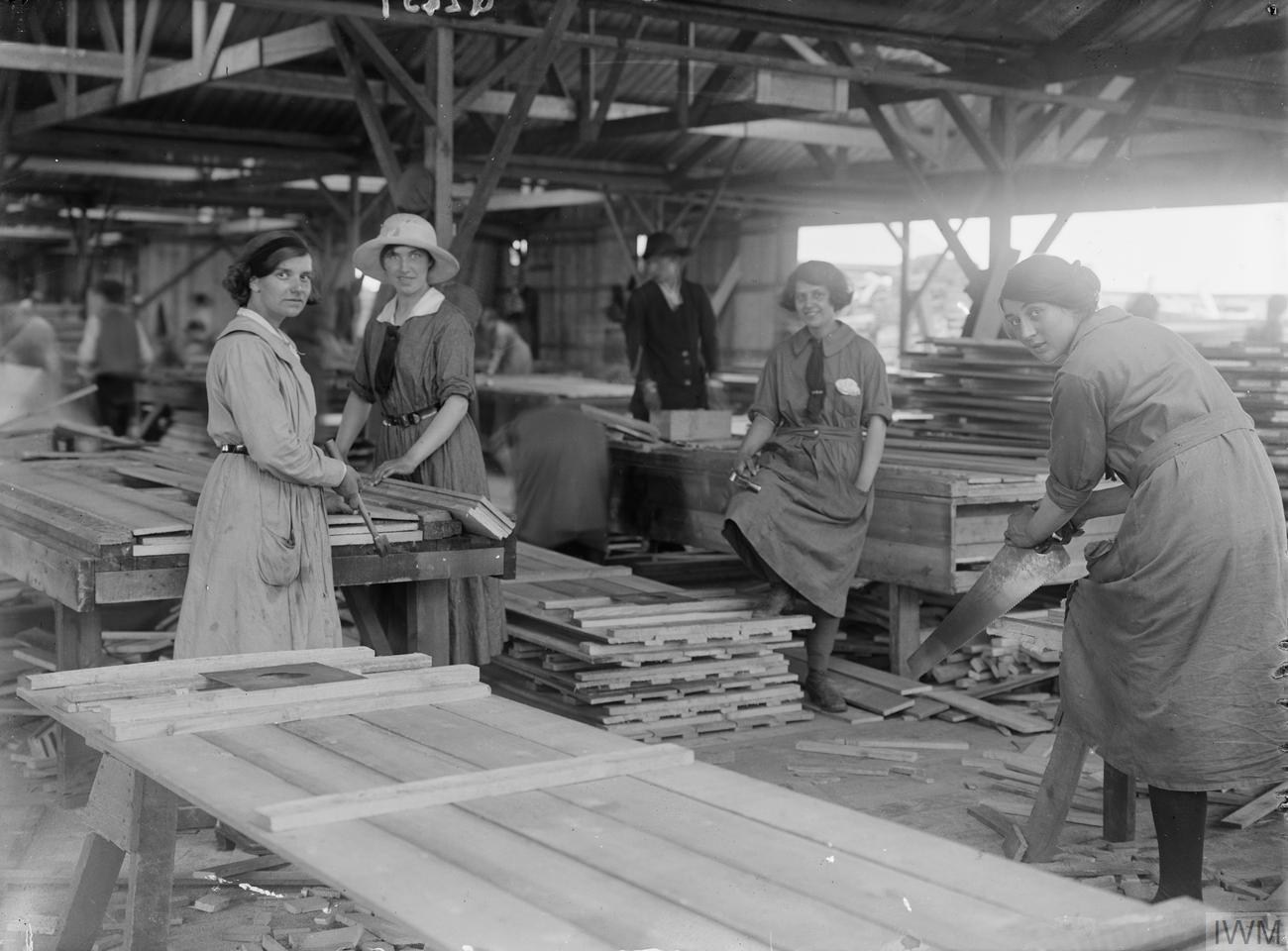
Women carpenters preparing Tarrant hut components near Calais, 1917

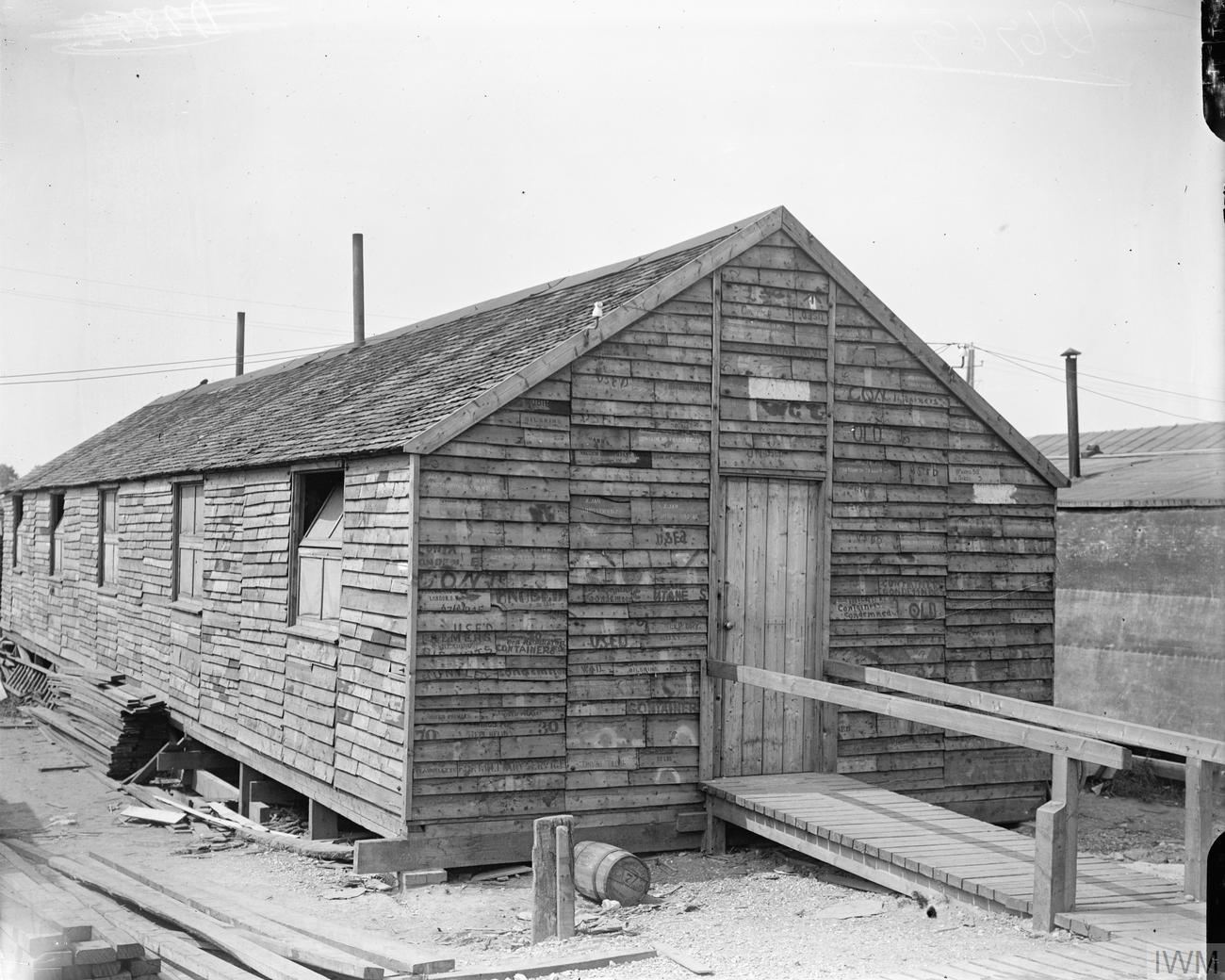
A completed Tarrant hut

During World War I, his company manufactured large numbers of prefabricated wooden huts for military use on the Western Front and also designed and constructed the Tarrant Tabor six-engined triplane bomber, which crashed at Farnborough aerodrome when attempting its first flight on 26 May 1919.

The company employed 5,000 people at Byfleet in the 1920s but towards the end of the decade the Depression reduced the demand for large expensive houses. However, Tarrant continued to win contracts for many new council houses in the Woking area.

In August 1931, W G Tarrant Ltd entered receivership but the building department survived, reforming as Tarrant Builders Ltd with Tarrant's eldest son Percy as a director. This company built many houses in Virginia Water before and after World War II and the original company's land became owned by Wentworth Estates Ltd.

Around 1940, Tarrant purchased Hafod Estate at Eglwys Newydd, near Cwmystwyth above Aberystwyth in Wales and moved to live there soon afterwards. He soon began felling trees for use as pit-props for the war-effort and also started to plan the restoration of the neglected mansion there. He died on 18 March 1942 at Hafod Mansion, as a result of a coronary thrombosis and was buried in the Hafod churchyard.

== Biographer ==
Extensive research into the housebuilding was carried out by Mavis Swenarton who in 1992 described Tarrant as 'a man of vision and enterprise... with a reputation for high quality materials and good workmanship... an imposing figure, over six ft tall and a thick beard which gave him a striking resemblance to King Edward VII'.

== Aircraft ==
- Tarrant Tabor
