= Byfleet Manor =

House in Byfleet, Surrey, England

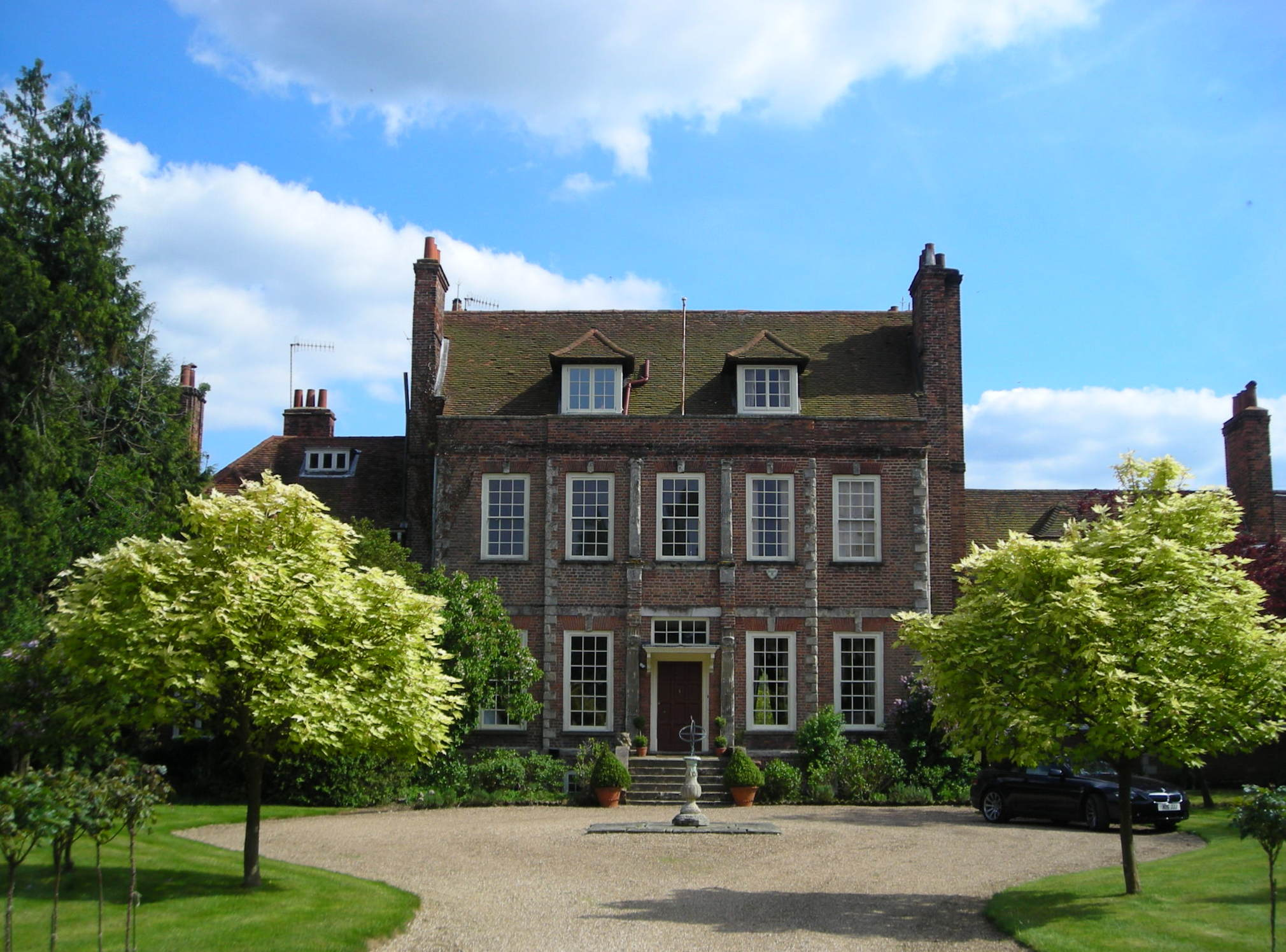
- Byfleet Manor in 2013

- Location within Surrey
- 51°19′53.6″N 0°27′49.9″W
- Location: Byfleet, Surrey
- OS grid reference: TQ 07116 60280

History
- Built: 1685

Listed Building – Grade II*
- Official name: Manor House and Manorside West
- Designated: 22 July 1953
- Reference no.: 1236613

Byfleet Manor is a Grade II* listed house in Byfleet, Surrey, England. Byfleet Manor has been used as a filming location in three television series, most notably Downton Abbey.

== History ==
Byfleet Manor's precursor was a royal hunting lodge given by Edward II to Piers Gaveston, his reputed lover. Anne of Denmark, wife of King James I, the house's last royal owner, commissioned a fresh house here in 1617. She kept horses sent by her brother Christian IV in the park, and spent at least £250 on the house. However, she died before the work was finished. According to John Aubrey, the house was completed by the courtier James Fullerton. The front walls and gate piers, which can still be seen today, date from that time.

A detailed ownership and account of royal rights is set out in sources covering this period of history, such as the Feet of Fines and the Assize Rolls kept in the royal collections and The National Archives, but which is well summarised in, for example, the Victoria County History.

A rebuilding followed in 1685 as the Jacobean house was reported to be ruinous. This change led to a much smaller building. In 1672 the lands were granted to Lord Holles and others to hold in trust for Queen Catherine of Braganza for her life, and afterwards for Charles II of England and his heirs. In 1694 Sir John Buckworth, lord of the manor of Byfleet, was accused of neglect in repairing a bridge over the Wey. It was found, however, that he was not responsible for such repair, as he was only a "termer for years" in the manor under a "lease made by the late queen mother's trustees." There is very little trace of the manor for about a century after this.

An Enclosure Award, privatising fields, was made in 1811 for 780 acres (3.2 km^{2}) in the parish, including common fields of Byfleet Manor, i.e. formerly whose profits were shared between its owner, tenants and subtenants.

The house remained virtually unaltered until 1905, when it was restored and enlarged with the addition of asymmetrical wings. The scant modern vestiges of the ancient manorial rights were sold to a firm of solicitors in that decade. In February 2013, a hidden room was found within the home. The owners have allowed the patios and front rooms to be hired to host 1920s-themed tea parties.

=== Filming location ===
Byfleet has been used as a filming location including; Downton Abbey, Agatha Christie's Poirot: After the Funeral, Cranford and Into the Woods.
