= Private road association =

Non-profit organization specialazing in private roads

A private road association is an organization, typically nonprofit, specializing in private roads.

== Sweden ==
Two-thirds of the Swedish road system is run by these organizations, which range in size from a few households to tens of thousands of households. Dues to the associations are assessed based on a legal survey of property size and road use. For instance, a business that puts many heavy trucks on the road would be assessed accordingly. Private roads associations that allow public use of their roads and meet certain other criteria can receive subsidies from the national government.

The private roads only handle 4% of the traffic and about 50% are forest roads mainly opened for commercial purposes. About two thirds of the private roads carry fewer than 100 vehicles per day.

== St. Louis ==
In St. Louis, these are referred to as "street associations." They provide not only roads but other municipal services, such as garbage collection and security. Typically these are neighborhoods where the streets were previously public but have been deeded to the street associations by the city, in exchange for the residents providing their own city services.

== See also ==
- Free market roads
- Voluntary society
