= Esher railway station =

Railway station in Surrey, England

Esher
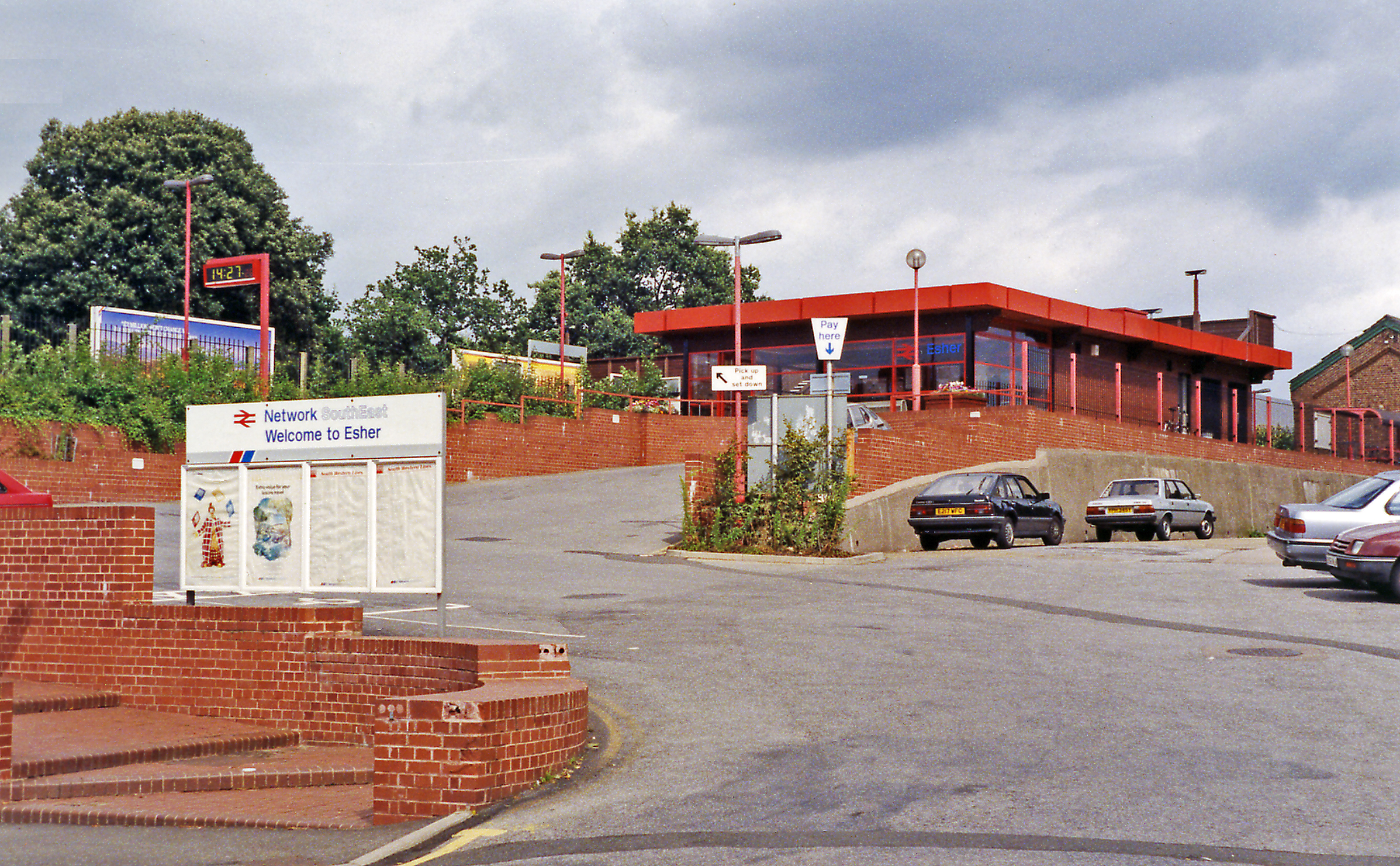

General information
- Location: Esher, Elmbridge; England
- Coordinates: 51°22′48″N 0°21′09″W
- Grid reference: TQ146658
- Managed by: South Western Railway
- Platforms: 4

Other information
- Station code: ESH
- Classification: DfT category C2

History
- Opened: 21 May 1838
- Original company: London and Southampton Railway
- Pre-grouping: London and South Western Railway
- Post-grouping: Southern Railway

Key dates
- 21 May 1838: Opened as Ditton Marsh
- c. 1840: Renamed Esher and Hampton Court
- July 1844: Renamed Esher and Claremont
- 1 June 1913: Renamed Esher

Passengers
- 2020/21: ▼0.171 million
- 2021/22: ▲0.554 million
- 2022/23: ▲0.752 million
- 2023/24: ▲0.809 million
- 2024/25: ▲0.877 million
Location
Notes
- Passenger statistics from the Office of Rail and Road

Esher railway station is a station on the South West Main Line operated by South Western Railway in Surrey, England. The station adjoins the north of Esher with two footpaths skirting Sandown Park Racecourse, the town's commercial area being 300 metres beyond the racecourse entrance. The station is situated between Surbiton and Hersham and is 14 miles 31 chains (23.2 km) from London Waterloo.

== History ==
The railway arrived here in 1838. A minor request stop was immediately opened and a station built and named Ditton Marsh, being the wetter part of Ditton Common. The common marks the boundary between what was then the west of Thames Ditton and Esher. The station was opened on 21 May 1838, and the name changed to Esher and Hampton Court about 1840. It has since been renamed twice more: to Esher and Claremont (Note: The reference from 1844 until 1913 was to Prince Leopold's Claremont House and Landscape Garden being 1.5 miles (2.4 km) south) in July 1844, and to Esher on 1 June 1913. It has also been shown as Esher for Claremont, or as Esher for Sandown Park in some timetables.

== Amenities ==
The station and track is elevated above street level.

A special gate on the platform opens directly onto Sandown Park racecourse.

== Services ==
At off-peak times two trains per hour in both directions call at Esher, the termini being London Waterloo station and the larger Surrey town of Woking.

Additional trains operate during peak hours, of which at least 4 (2 in the morning rush-hour, 2 in the evening) terminate at Guildford (which also serves as the terminus for stopping trains on Sundays).

Woking is the point of change for services to longer distance destinations to the south-west (see stations below).

Preceding station	National Rail	Following station
Surbiton	South Western Railway; Waterloo to Woking	Hersham

=== Former amenities ===
Two additional island platforms are disused and not accessible to passengers though passed by through trains.

Bus services 515 and on Sundays 715 serve the station.

== Location ==
The station is to the west of Weston Green which falls within the Esher postal district. Esher parish is close by the station and has included the Sandown Park grounds since its establishment in the early medieval period. A footpath to the west of the station skirts Sandown Park Racecourse and leads to the Lower Green area of Esher. The town's commercial area lies 300 metres beyond the racecourse entrance, followed by West End and Claremont. The station is the closest to Esher by road. Thames Ditton railway station on the branch line to Hampton Court is closest to the eastern half of Weston Green, which lies within the Thames Ditton postal district.

== See also ==
- Esher
- Weston Green
- Molesey

== Notes and references ==
Notes
