= Byfleet =

Village and parish in Surrey, England

Coordinates: 51°20′N 0°28′W

- Village
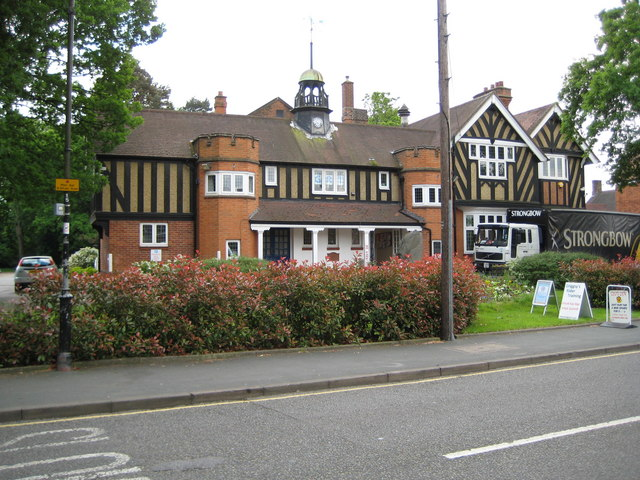
- Byfleet Village Hall

- Location within Surrey
- Area: 6.24 km^{2} (2.41 sq mi)
- Population: 7,724 (ward, 2011)
  - Density: 1,238/km^{2} (3,210/sq mi)
- OS grid reference: TQ078648
- District: Woking
- Shire county: Surrey
- Region: South East
- Country: England
- Sovereign state: United Kingdom
- Post town: West Byfleet
- Postcode district: KT14
- Dialling code: 01932
- Police: Surrey
- Fire: Surrey
- Ambulance: South East Coast
- UK Parliament: Woking

Byfleet is a village in Surrey, England. It is located in the far east of the borough of Woking, around 1.5 miles (2.4 km) east of West Byfleet, from which it is separated by the M25 motorway and the Wey Navigation.

The village is of medieval origin. Its winding main street, High Road, contains old large public houses and several timber-framed houses, as well as other 16th and 17th century houses with listed status. The former Brooklands motor racing circuit is located just to the north, while to the east, across the River Wey, is the former Silvermere estate, now a golf club.

Byfleet is served by Byfleet & New Haw railway station, on the South West Main Line. In July 2012, its northern bypass hosted the long-distance cycling road races for the 2012 Summer Olympics.

== History ==
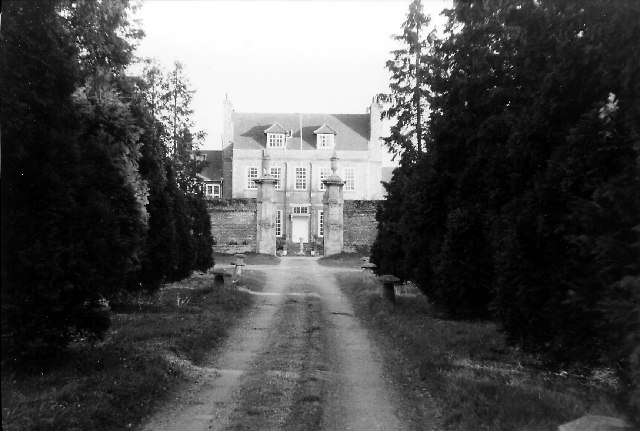
Byfleet Manor

The village was in the Godley hundred, a Saxon division for strategic and taxation purposes. Byfleet appears in Domesday Book as Byeflete. It was held by Ulwin (Wulfwin) from Chertsey Abbey. Its domesday assets were: 2 1/2 cultivated hides; 1 church, 1 mill rendering 5 shillings per year, 1 1/2 fisheries worth 325 eels (per year), 6 acres (2.4 ha) of meadow, woodland worth 10 hogs. It was taxed to render all in all £4 for the year to its overlords.

=== Industrial history ===
Byfleet expanded considerably after the opening of the Brooklands motor circuit in 1907 and when major aircraft factories opened there during World War I. A large housing estate for Vickers aircraft workers was built between Chertsey Road and Oyster Lane in World War I and although sold off by the early sixties, these houses still exist today. The Tarrant Tabor bomber, the largest aeroplane built in Britain during World War I, was constructed in Byfleet by W G Tarrant Ltd but crashed fatally at Farnborough on 26 May 1919 on its first attempted take-off. Several other aeroplanes were built in Byfleet by Glenny & Henderson Ltd in the late 1920s.

The influence of the aircraft industry on the village's development continued between the wars and during World War Two and most of the new aeroplanes built at Brooklands took off over the centre of Byfleet on their first flights – the most spectacular being the first flight of the pioneering Vickers VC10 in 1962. The urgent need to supply the Vickers Valiant V-bomber to the RAF led to the removal of the central section of the race track's Byfleet Banking when a new hard runway was built in 1951.

Various aircraft crashed in and around Byfleet during the first half of the last century; these include a Vickers Viking amphibian (on 13 April 1922, flown by record-breaking England-Australia Vickers Vimy pilot Sir Ross Macpherson Smith and Lt Bennett – both men died when they crashed behind the Byfleet Banking just after take-off), the prototype Vickers Wibault (in June 1926, flown by chief test pilot 'Tiny' Scholefield – he baled out and the aeroplane crashed on the Vickers Sports Ground), an RAF Taylorcraft Auster (on 12 March 1943, flown by Capt W Whitson who hit a barrage balloon cable on bad visibility and crashed) and an RAF North American P-51 Mustang III (on 6 April 1944, flown by S/Ldr Szawblowsky who struck a balloon cable and crashed near Oyster Lane). On 2 January 1945 a Vickers Warwick GRV, s/n PN773, flown by test pilot Bob Handasyde crashed beside Rectory Lane in Three Acre Field close to St Mary's Church and just missed road-sweeper Jack Smith with a wing-tip. A single wooden propeller blade recovered from the scene in 1945 survives today in the Brooklands Museum collection.

=== World War II ===
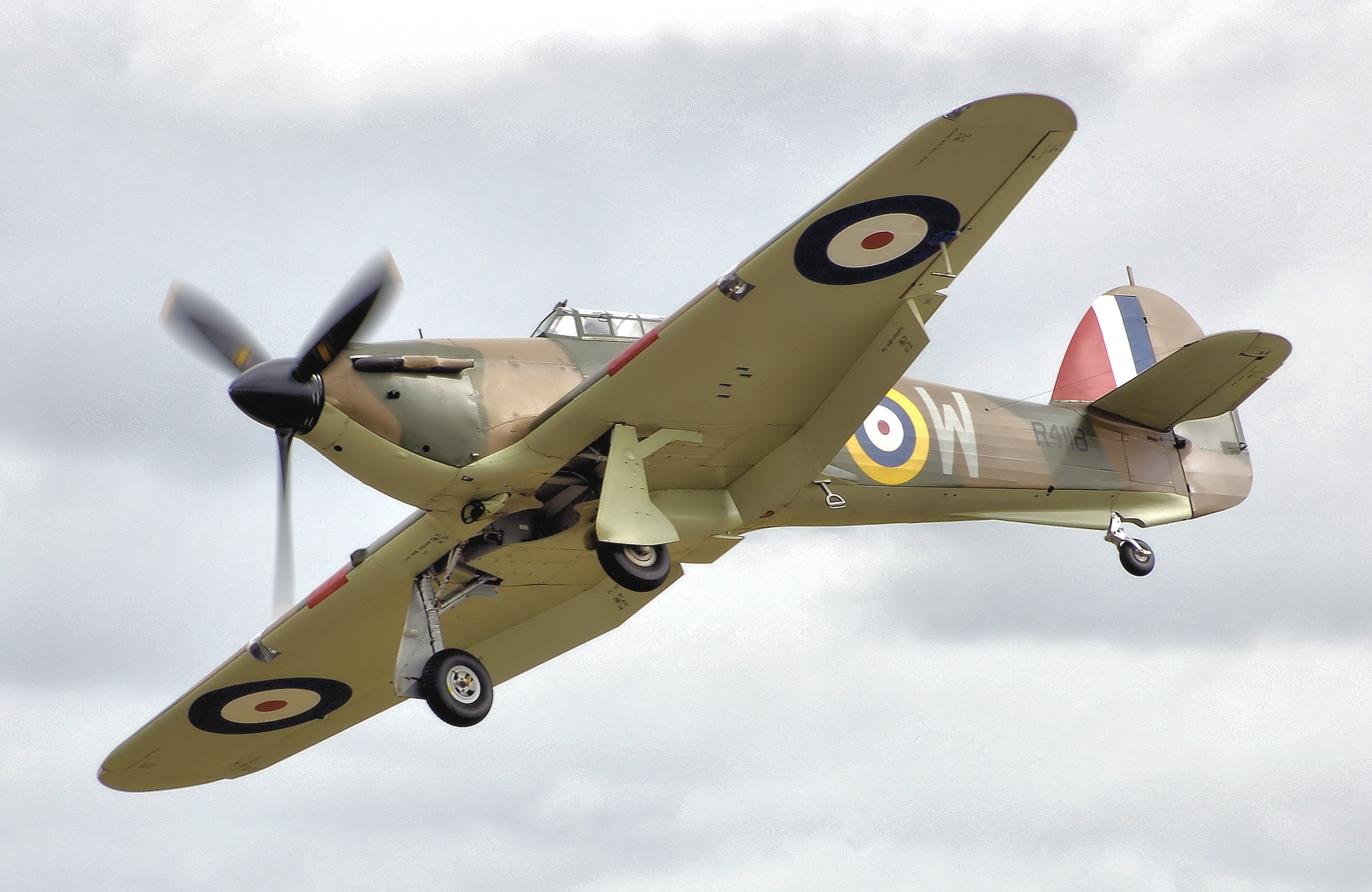
Most Hawker Hurricanes in the Battle of Britain were assembled in a major factory on the village boundary.

Great effects also took place in this part of the county: evacuees, British and Canadian soldiers and German prisoners of war were all accommodated locally and the Vickers factory on the east side of Brooklands was bombed with heavy loss of life on 4 September 1940. By 2200hrs the following day, 21 barrage balloons with rope lines and other military defences were deployed locally including along the nearby Seven Hills Road. The Hawker aircraft factory on the Byfleet side of the aerodrome was targeted two days later resulting in major damage to certain buildings but with no loss of life nor any serious disruption to Hurricane production. The importance of Brooklands to the war effort was emphasised by the construction circa 1941 of a large anti-aircraft gun tower just east of the village at Manor Farm, together with two similar structures built on the north side of Brooklands. Gun crews on each of these 'flak' towers manned a 40mm Bofors gun against further enemy air attacks.

A fatal accident in the centre of Byfleet on 24 September 1942 saw a Bren Gun Carrier operated by the Welsh Guards collide with the corner of The Plough pub killing a regular customer, Miss Edith Minnie Wyatt. She visited the pub regularly around midday and was co-owner of 'The Old Log Cabin' (a small shop opposite nearby Binfield Road). She died outside the premises having been pinned against the pub's bay window. This part of the building was then shored up with timber for a considerable period of time afterwards.

In 1944 many troops stationed locally departed for France on D-Day and older residents still recall a column of Canadian tanks and other military vehicles which passed through the village at that time with a long tail-back running for two days along High Road between the War Memorial and The Clockhouse. Byfleet also came under attack from V-1 'Doodlebug' flying bombs – two fell beside Byfleet Road on 21 August and slightly injured two people. That same year a new Vickers flight test airfield opened just south of Byfleet at Wisley.

=== Motor racing ===
Brooklands' record-breaking racing driver J G Parry-Thomas and Bert Denly, motorcycle racer, lived in Byfleet in the 1920s and the renowned race-tuner Robin Jackson lived at St George's Hill and had an engineering works in Byfleet after World War II. Also post-war, Brooklands' engineer Francis Beart had a small workshop in High Road, from 1947 to 1956/57, specialising in tuning Norton motorcycles. Beart had also been a record-breaking motorcyclist at Brooklands, holding the Test Hill record on a Grindlay Peerless.

After World War 2, the village became a greater centre for automotive-related businesses, garages, showrooms and workshops and these included post-war racing driver Duncan Hamilton's racing workshop and car showroom in the west end of High Road, the base for his successful C-type Jaguar victory at Le Mans in 1953.

=== Sporting venues ===
During July 2012 Byfleet became a host of the London 2012 Olympic Games when the road cycle races passed through the village. The races took place on 28th (men's), and 29th (women's), of July 2012. The route passed west along the A245, Parvis Road, from Weybridge towards West Byfleet.

== Landmarks ==
=== Architectural history ===
Seven buildings are listed, its watermill and two of the churchyard tombs. St Mary's Church in the village centre dates back to at least the 14th century, and medieval elements are kept in the structure of Byfleet Manor, built in 1686 – these are listed at Grade I and Grade II* (the top two categories) respectively.

In 1895, 20-year-old Hampshire-born Walter George Tarrant started a new carpentry business, W G Tarrant Ltd, in Byfleet and later expanded into housebuilding. The company built extensively in Pyrford and West Byfleet in the early 1900s. By 1911 the Tarrant Works covered c. 5 acres (2.0 ha) and included workshops for joinery, wrought iron and leaded lights, a stonemason's yard and a timber mill with drying sheds. The firm owned nurseries and brickfields elsewhere and was Byfleet's largest employer for many years.

In 1898, the village gained an impressive village hall and club, funded by Frederick C Stoop who lived at West Hall between Byfleet and West Byfleet.

In 1928 a new Wesleyan Chapel was built opposite St Mary's School on the junction of High Road and Rectory Lane and in 1939 an impressive new Byfleet Methodist Church designed by Woking architects Kenneth Wood and Charles Rose was completed on land immediately south of this. Built in typical Modernist style with a bright interior and stained glass windows designed and produced by the Thomas Camm Studio in Smethwick, this building survives in very original condition today.

In 1935, an existing vehicle garage and petrol station trading as "Byfleet Motors Ltd" in High Road was rebuilt in typical 'modern' style and featured an impressive white painted cement-rendered brick facade with a central clock tower, neon lighting and a well-equipped workshop at the rear. One of the Directors was C E C Martin who raced cars at nearby Brooklands and various racing and sports cars were serviced and repaired here for other owners and drivers too. These same premises still survive in the motor-trade today although the frontage has been modified and petrol sales ceased many years ago.

=== St. Mary's Church ===
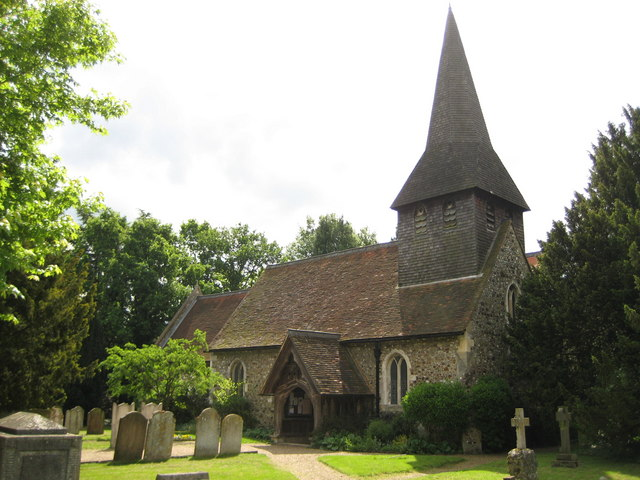
Church of St Mary the Virgin

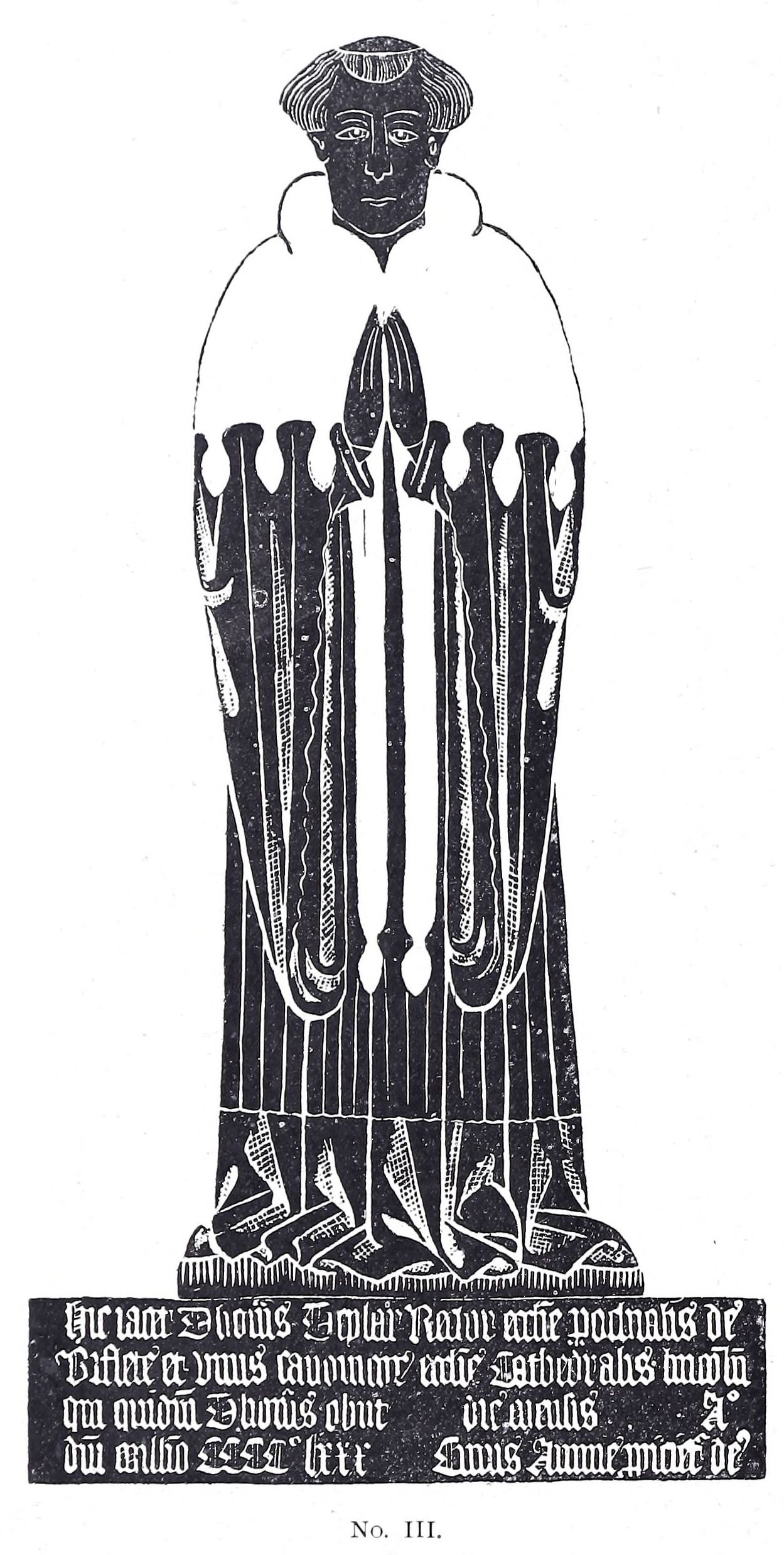
Brass of Thomas Teylar, Rector of Byfleet

The bellcote, nave and chancel were all rebuilt in the late 13th Century in a very simple Early English style. St Mary's Church interior features some very rare wooden crosses (grave markers) recovered from Europe shortly after World War I.

Graves in the churchyard include those of:

- Brooklands-based racing driver J G Parry-Thomas (see above) who died aged 42 at Pendine Sands in 1927 while attacking the world Land Speed Record.
- Record-breaking motorcyclist Bert le Vack who was killed at the age of 44 while testing a new motorcycle in the Swiss Alps in 1931.
- Gerald Napier, the first pilot to be killed in a flying accident at Brooklands, who died on 1 August 1911, aged only 19.
- Scottish aviation pioneer and Vickers' first test pilot Harold Barnwell who was killed flying a new prototype fighter at Joyce Green Aerodrome near Dartford, Kent, in 1917.
- Ebeneezer Mears, local construction business founder.
- Margaret Honor Wellby, believed to be the first British woman pilot to die flying an aeroplane, who lived with her parents at nearby St George's Hill, crash-landed Avro 504 G-EBFM (ex H2070) on take-off from Brooklands in 1928.
- Victims of the Luftwaffe's 1940 bombing of Brooklands including: 17-year-old Irene Coleman, 36-year-old Edward Eastwood and 21-year-old Gwendoline Goddard, who all worked for Vickers.
- Lt Arthur Doricourt Roberts, MC, RFC, who was killed in a flying training accident near Hanworth on 31 August 1917, aged 22.
- Captain Edward Arnold (Ted) Jones, Director of Brooklands Aviation Ltd and a popular instructor at the Brooklands School of Flying, who was accidentally killed aged 34 at Hendon after a flight from Brooklands ended with his DH60M Moth G-AAVU hitting a windsock mast then crashing while landing on 8 November 1931.
- Sir Horace Curzon Plunkett KCVO PC (Ire) JP DL FRS (24 October 1854 – 26 March 1932), an Anglo-Irish agricultural reformer, pioneer of agricultural cooperatives, Unionist MP, supporter of Home Rule, Irish Senator and author.

Locations for all of these graves can be found using an interactive map on the Byfleet Heritage Society's website.

== Sanway ==
The history of the Sanway area of Byfleet is largely unrecorded and therefore currently being researched by local historians. Among its original residents in the early 20th century was record-breaking racing motorcyclist Bert Denly who lived in Richmond Cottages.

The Sanway Laundry was a major local employer from the early 1900s until the 1960s with its distinctive green and white delivery vans. One of several late 19th century laundries established in the Sanway area of the village, it moved during World War 1 to occupy part of the former Byfleet Brewery in High Road until closed and redeveloped c.1970 as 'The Willows' housing estate. Another smaller laundry in Binfield Cottages (beside Top Field, Sanway) provided a laundry service for Byfleet Manor and was managed by Mrs Amelia Bailey (later Harling) but closed soon after she died c.1936.

== Housing developments ==
Despite many new housing developments in recent decades and a number of flats for older residents such as 'Barnes Wallis Court' opened in 2009 at the junction of Oyster Lane and Parvis Road, Byfleet Village still has character and a number of interesting old buildings today including 12 nationally designated Listed buildings. Nine others are Locally Listed and the West end of High Road is also a Conservation Area.

== 21st century ==
Byfleet is an ancient parish. It was included as a civil parish in the Chertsey Rural District in 1884; it was added to the Woking Urban District in 1933 under a County Review Order, thus extinguishing its parish council. On 1 April 1974 the parish was abolished and became part of the unparished area of Woking, on 1 April 1990 Byfleet became a parish again. In June 2005, the Office of the Deputy Prime Minister refused to abolish the parish, despite its own request. In May 2007, a group standing under an "Abolish Byfleet Parish Council" banner won election to the Parish Council and again proceeded to seek its abolition. The civil parish was abolished on 1 April 2010. In 2001 the parish had a population of 6,995. It is now in the unparished area of Woking.

The War Memorial commemorates military personnel and civilians who died in both world wars who came from the local community. The memorial includes public benches, flower beds and a stone wall with the name of each casualty.

The traditional Byfleet Parish Day is held on the recreation ground with supporting events (including local crafts and home grown produce competitions) in the nearby village hall and St Mary's Day Centre every July.

The Clock House, in High Road, is an 18th-century mansion extended and converted in the 1960s into a retirement communal home for the elderly before its latest renovation as flats for the over-fifties was completed in 2009.

The Blue Anchor Hotel was on 29 March 1924 the setting for a notorious murder. In January that year 41-year-old Mabel Theresa Jones, wife of landlord Alfred George Poynter Jones, had travelled to Biarritz to recover from a nervous breakdown. At Biarritz's Hôtel Victoria, with the aid of a French-English dictionary, she was seduced by 45-year-old French wireless operator Jean-Pierre Vaquier. When Mabel received a telegram from her husband calling her back to Byfleet, Vaquier followed, and in London the affair continued. Vaquier then took a room at the Blue Anchor and eventually killed Alfred Jones by adding strychnine to the dose of salts Jones habitually took as a hangover cure. Vaquier was hanged at Wandsworth Prison on 12 August 1924.

Parvis Road was part of the 2012 Olympics Cycle Road Race route in July 2012 and also for the practice race for 150 entrants on 14 August 2011, which was won by British team member Mark Cavendish.

In the centre of Brooklands in September 2012, Brooklands Museum installed the 40% scale model of the Concorde airliner previously displayed near the entrance to London Heathrow Airport's Central Terminal Tunnel. Repainted in authentic 1970s airline colours, the model is located beside beside the junction of Wellington Way and Sopwith Drive serves as a reference of Brooklands' aviation and industrial heritage.

== Byfleet Heritage Society ==
The Byfleet Heritage Society formed in 1996 and has detailed historical displays in Byfleet Library's Heritage Room with popular monthly meetings in the former Victorian school, now the St Mary's Centre. Recent Society projects include researching such subjects as Byfleet's numerous shops and businesses, village life in both world wars, the Stoop family and West Hall and, thanks to the support of Surrey County Council and many volunteers, finding and recording the gravestones and memorials for over 2,500 known burial locations in St Mary's Churchyard – resulting in a new interactive map and database launched and added to the Society's website on 29 March 2015. A blue plaque organised by the Society in memory of the well known early 20th century Dutch benefactors, Frederick and Agnes Stoop (who lived in nearby West Hall), was officially unveiled on front of the Village Hall by the Dutch Cultural Attache, Daphne Thissen, on 11 September 2015.

== Byfleet Fire Station ==
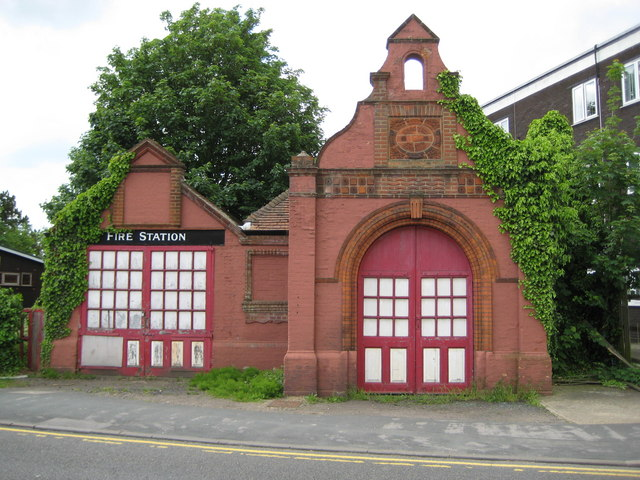
The Old Fire Station

This rare surviving example of a Victorian village fire station was built at the West end of High Road in 1885 by local MP and former Lord Mayor of London Sir John Ellis and served the village until it closed in 1963. Still owned by Surrey County Council, it was designated a Grade II Listed building in 2008. Thanks to a partnership of Brooklands Museum, the Byfleet Heritage Society and other local organisations, volunteers researched the building's history, secured grants and sponsorship, organised professional conservation and condition surveys, carried out essential repairs, staged regular public open days and improved the building's internal and external appearance. Roof repairs were made in 2012 and, with the aid of two further grants, the electrics were renewed in 2013 and all exterior doors were repaired and repainted in 2014. Since then, 'The Friends of Byfleet Fire Station' renamed the Byfleet Fire Station Trust in 2021, has continued to discuss future options for re-using the building with its owners Surrey County Council and other interested parties. As a result of these efforts, Surrey County Council appointed Croydon-based specialist contractors Knightsbridge Property Services to repair and restore the building. Work started in July 2024 and was completed on 28 March 2025.

== Immediate surroundings ==
Byfleet borders the Brooklands retail park (which includes Currys/PC World, Lidl, Marks & Spencer, Tesco and TK Maxx) on the western part of the former Brooklands motor circuit and aerodrome, the northern part of which is dominated by Mercedes-Benz World and the Brooklands Hotel. St George's Hill, Weybridge, adjoins to the north-east and West Byfleet lies to the west. On the northern edge of the Brooklands business park, Byfleet and New Haw railway station is a stopping-service station on the South West Main Line which connects the village to central London.

== Demography ==
The proportion of households in Byfleet who owned their home outright was just over 9% greater than the borough and regional average. The proportion who owned their home with a loan was 4% greater than the regional average; providing overall a lower proportion than average of rented residential property and of social housing, and close to the average in Surrey.

2011 Census Key Statistics
Output area	Population	Households	% Owned outright	% Owned with a loan	hectares
Byfleet (ward)	7,724	3,174	32.4	44.3	624

== Local government ==
At Surrey County Council, one of the 81 representatives represents the area for The Byfleets division.

At Woking Borough Council, a few wards of the borough are deemed appropriate to be represented under the current constitution of councillors by three councillors, which is the case for Byfleet.

Woking Borough Councillor
Election	Member	Ward
2021	Josh Brown	Byfleet & West Byfleet
2016	Amanda Boote	Byfleet & West Byfleet
2016	Mary Bridgeman	Byfleet & West Byfleet

Surrey County Councillor
Election	Member	Electoral Division
2018	Amanda Boote	The Byfleets

== Literature ==
Byfleet is mentioned in chapter 12 of The War of the Worlds by H. G. Wells;

Byfleet was in a tumult; people packing, and a score of hussars, some of them dismounted, some on horseback, were hunting them about. Three or four black government waggons, with crosses in white circles, and an old omnibus, among other vehicles, were being loaded in the village street. There were scores of people, most of them sufficiently sabbatical to have assumed their best clothes. The soldiers were having the greatest difficulty in making them realise the gravity of their position. We saw one shrivelled old fellow with a huge box and a score or more of flower pots containing orchids, angrily expostulating with the corporal who would leave them behind.

== Notable residents ==
- Sir George Barnes – born in Byfleet in 1904; Controller of BBC Radio and Television in the 1940s and 50s. Principal of the University College of North Staffordshire, now Keele University 1956–60.
- Albert William 'Bert' Denly (1900–1987) - lived in Sanway and worked as a delivery boy for Derisley's butcher's shop before finding fame at Brooklands as a record-breaking motorcyclist then worked for George Eyston, Cobham-based Thomson & Taylor and Castrol oil company where he retired as Chief Development Engineer.
- Harry Dodson – born in Byfleet; presenter of 1987 TV series The Victorian Kitchen Garden.
- Sir John Ellis – former Lord Mayor of London, MP and founder of Byfleet Fire Brigade, lived at Petersham House in High Road in the late 19th century.
- Robin Jackson - well-known Brooklands-based automotive engineer in the 1930s, lived on nearby St George's Hill and also had a post-war engineering business in Byfleet's Royston Road industrial estate.
- Sarah Miles – lived in Byfleet in the late 1960s – early 1970s.
- Joseph Spence – 18th Century historian.
- Walter George Tarrant – lived at Lake House, Chertsey Road.

== See also ==
- List of places of worship in Woking (borough)

== Bibliography ==
- Allen, Jim, BEM (2018) 'Byfleet in the Great War' (Byfleet Heritage Society)
- Flower, Stephen (1994) 'Raiders Overhead – The Bombing of Walton & Weybridge' (Air Research Publications, Walton on Thames)
- Gardner, Charles (1956) 'Fifty Years of Brooklands' (Heinemann).
- Gilbert, James (1975) 'The World's Worst Aircraft – A Rogue's Gallery of Flying Follies' (M & J Hobbs Ltd & Michael Joseph Ltd) – see chapter on the Byfleet-built Tarrant Tabor bomber.
- Norris, Richard (2008) 'The Life and Works of Walter George Tarrant' (self-published).
- Stevens, Leonard R (1977, Reprinted and Revised edition) The Parish Church of St Mary The Virgin Byfleet' (printed locally).
- Stevens, Leonard, E, (2nd edition reprint, 2001) 'Byfleet – A Village of England'(Byfleet Heritage Society).
- Wakeford, Iain (2000) 'Byfleet – A Heritage Walks Guide' (AK, HR & DA Wakeford, Old Woking, Surrey).
