= St George's Hill =

Gated community in Surrey, England

Coordinates: 51.352°N 0.445°W

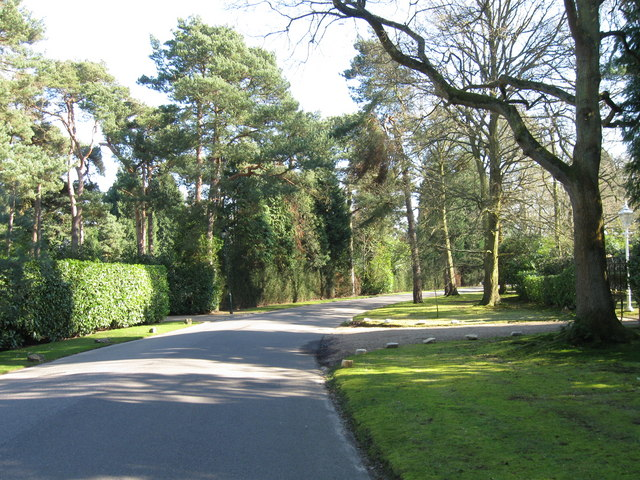
East Road (2014)

St George's Hill is a 964-acre (3.9 km^{2}) private gated community in Weybridge, Surrey, England.

Comprising more than 450 properties, the land that is now the contemporary St George's Hill estate was purchased by builder W. G. Tarrant in 1911. Over the following decades, Tarrant masterminded the development of St George's Hill into a country retreat for wealthy Londoners that promised both seclusion and natural beauty.

St George's Hill is known for its population of celebrities and high net worth individuals, and is generally considered the most prestigious of the Surrey private estates, only rivalled by nearby Wentworth. Notable residents have included John Lennon and Ringo Starr of the Beatles, golfer Nick Faldo, and F1 racing driver Jenson Button.

== Geography ==
=== Location ===
St George's Hill lies on the edge of the town of Weybridge in north Surrey, and is 23 miles southwest of central London. Its southern boundary is Byfleet Road, and its eastern side is formed of Seven Hills Road and Foxoak Hill. Its northern edge includes Queens Road and St George's Avenue, while it is bordered to the west by Brooklands Road.

=== Topography ===
The hill is the lowest in Surrey to be listed by the national database of hills of Britain and Ireland, which records claims for all Munros and other categories, ranking 36th and as a >50 tump. The easterly peak is the highest point of the three boroughs in the north-west corner of Surrey and has the highest summit to be strictly private. The summit is 255 feet (78 metres) above mean sea level (Ordnance Datum) and the minimum descent (notch/col) is 174 feet (53 metres).

== History ==
=== Early history ===
St George's Hill was once the site of an Iron Age hillfort, and the remains of the ramparts can still be seen. Erroneously referred to on many old maps as 'Caesar's camp', it was an 'unremarkable' construction, though perhaps slightly more complex than others of its type.

On 1 April 1649, a group of men and women led by Gerard Winstanley and William Everard began to 'dig and sow' St George's Hill, which they regarded as common land. They may also have begun making caves and dens. These people, soon to be known as Diggers, faced opposition from local communities, who regarded them as squatters. By September that year, the Diggers had decamped elsewhere. The dwellings they left behind were eventually destroyed.

The land was acquired by Prince Frederick, Duke of York and Albany in 1804. It came into the possession of the Egerton family during the Victorian period.

=== Modern history ===
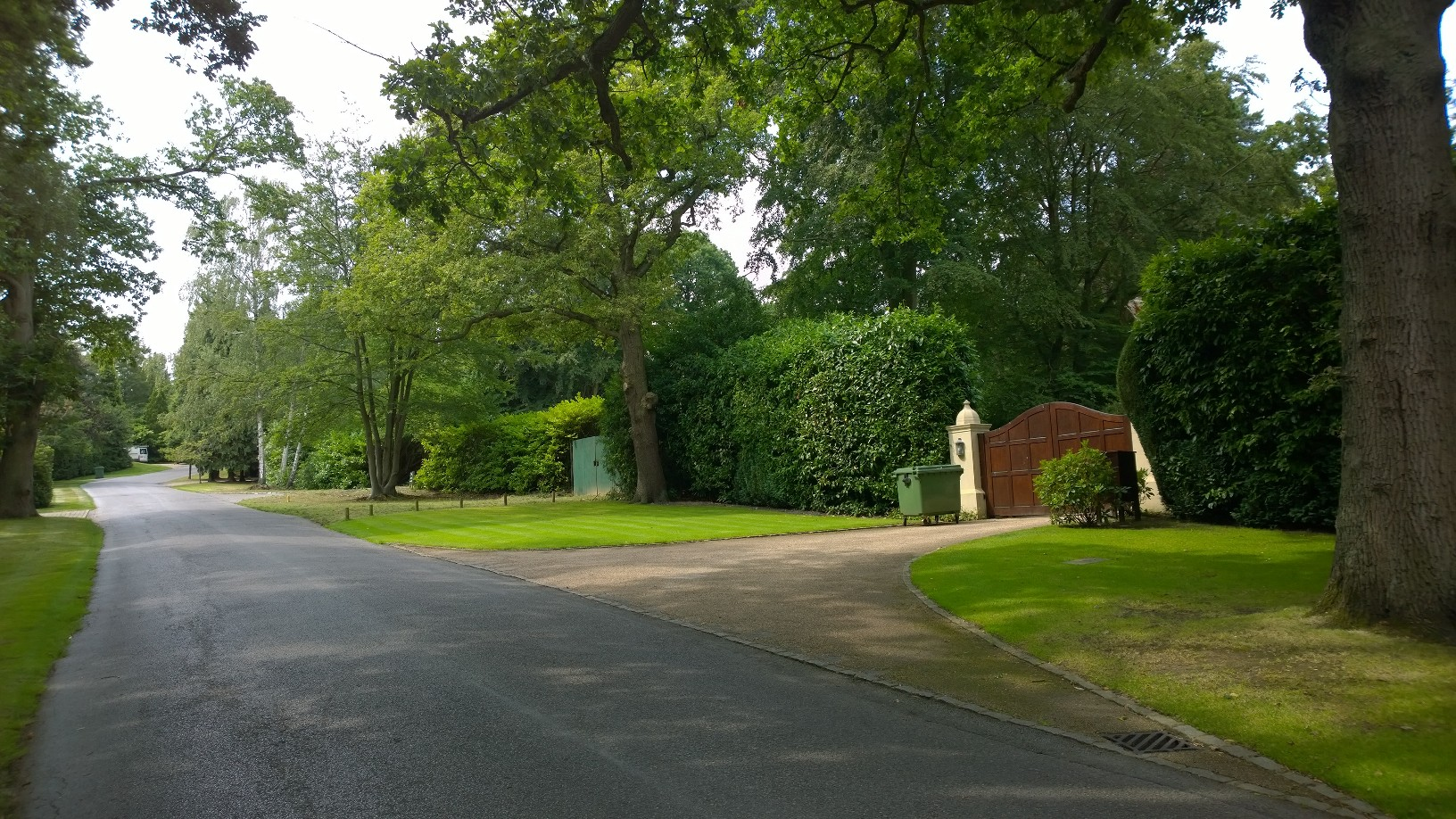
Camp End Road (2014)

In 1911, developer Walter George Tarrant purchased 964 acres of the ancient common land. His plan for the estate envisioned St George's Hill as an ideal residence for the modern professional man, offering privacy, natural beauty, and potential for sporting activities. The area developed rapidly, shifting from a 'wooded wilderness' to a 'hillside studded with mansions'.

In its early decades St George's Hill could still be accessed by visitors and picnickers, but was restricted to the public in 1928. Many of the earliest mansions were built in the then fashionable Arts and Crafts style.

The Beatles purchased a house in the 1960s, and in the following years the estate would attract a greater number of celebrity residents, to the extent that St George's Hill and the wider Elmbridge area have come to be regarded as a British Beverly Hills. The first decade of the 21st century saw an influx of wealthy Russians, and by 2022 more than a quarter of properties were owned by individuals from former Soviet states.

The radical history of St George's Hill has been commemorated by activists. Environmental campaigner George Monbiot and a group of supporters founded The Land is Ours in 1995 and squatted on the hill. They returned again in 1999 to mark the 350th anniversary of the Diggers' occupation, erecting a 'memorial stone' in the process.

== Transport ==
=== Rail ===
Weybridge railway station, managed by South Western Railway, can be accessed for rail services. It takes approximately 30 minutes to reach central London during rush hour travel to London Waterloo.

=== Road ===
St George's Hill is 3 miles from the M25 and 7 miles from the M3.

=== Air travel ===
For air travel, Heathrow is close by, and private aircraft can use nearby Fairoaks Airport.

== Amenities ==
=== Golf club ===
The course at St George's Hill Golf Club was designed in 1912 by Harry Colt and opened for play the following year. Known for its visual appeal, it has been described as one of the best examples of the 'Golden Age' of golf course design, as well as the course outside the United States that most resembles Pine Valley.

No longer a 36-hole complex, the Red and Blue nines make up the main course at St George's Hill. A third, somewhat shorter nine - the Green nine - was upgraded in 1987 by Donald Steel, with assistance from Jonathan Gaunt. In 2023, the Renaissance Golf Design firm was hired to produce a new masterplan for all holes at the club.

=== Tennis club ===
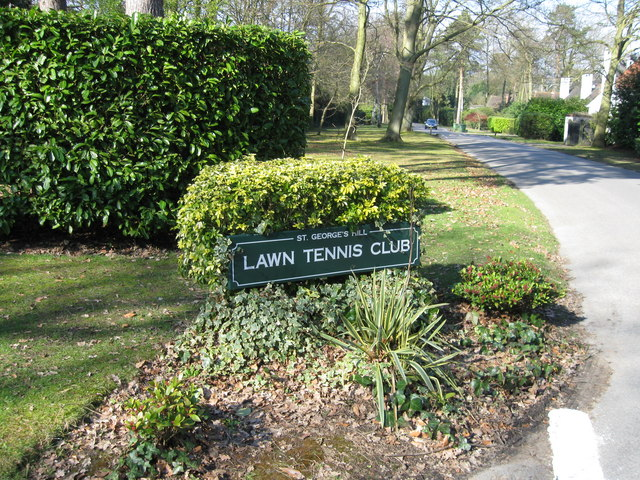
Tennis club entrance

St George's Hill Lawn Tennis Club was officially opened on 7 June 1915 by Prince Alexander of Teck and his wife Princess Alice. The club lies in the north-east corner of the estate next to Warren Pond. In common with the golf club, membership includes access to additional facilities: restaurants, gyms, swimming pools, health spas and crèches. Given the exclusive reputation of the area, the membership fee is typically lower than might be expected, which The Times compared in a 2016 article to that of David Lloyd Leisure.

There are 13 grass tennis courts, 10 artificial clay, 4 'porous acrylic', 2 artificial grass, 3 TruClay, and 2 indoor. Plans for the installation of padel courts were approved in July 2024, despite noise concerns from some residents. The club defended its plans on the basis that it could lose business from members going elsewhere for padel tennis.

== Security ==
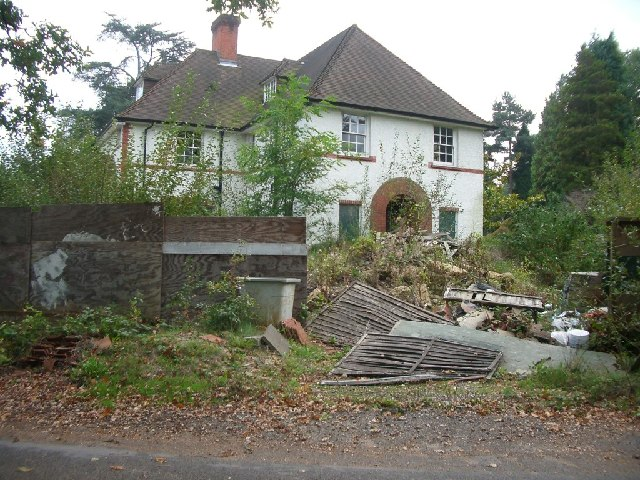
Woodlawn Cottage (2005)

The estate is accessed by a private, gated road which is controlled during the day by security personnel and is restricted at all times. Features include automatic number plate recognition technology.

The security aspect is a major draw for buyers, who want a property they know will be secure when they are travelling. A senior director of a real estate firm commented in a 2023 Country Life article that 'unless you have your own private security', there is unlikely to be a safer place in Britain to buy a home.

In 2011 there was a notable security breach when a group of squatters moved into Woodlawn Cottage, an empty property that had fallen into a state of disrepair. Estate management responded by placing 24 hour security patrols around the property while police awaited a court order to evict the squatters. Security was further tightened after the suspicious November 2012 death of resident Alexander Perepilichny.

== Notable residents ==
- Jenson Button – British racing driver
- Dick Emery – comedian
- Nick Faldo – professional golfer
- Engelbert Humperdinck – singer
- Elton John – singer
- Tom Jones – singer
- John Lennon – Beatles singer/songwriter and guitarist
- Bill Martin – songwriter
- Gordon Mills – musician, songwriter and manager
- Mian Muhammad Mansha – Forbes listed and one of the richest men in Pakistan
- Theo Paphitis – entrepreneur and Dragons Den star
- Alexander Perepilichny – allegedly poisoned Russian businessman and whistleblower
- Cliff Richard – British singer
- Shilpa Shetty – Indian actress
- Ringo Starr – Beatles singer/songwriter and drummer
- Eric Sykes – comedian
- John Terry – professional footballer and coach

== Other private estates ==
There are other estates in Elmbridge:

- Burwood Park
- Ashley Park
