= Agatha Blyth =

British Girl Guide executive (1867–1952)

- Born: Agatha Lawrence; 1867; Copse Hill, London, England
- Died: 1952 (aged 84–85); Hemel Hempstead, England
- Other name: Mrs C F T Blyth
- Occupation: Girl Guide executive
- Spouse: Charles Frederick Tolme Blyth (m. 1896)
- Children: 2
- Family: Penelope Lawrence (sister), Paul Ogden Lawrence (brother)

Agatha Blyth (1867–1952) was instrumental in the earliest years of the Guide movement. She was the founder of the Girl Guide Officers' Training School (GGOTS) in 1915.

== Personal life ==
Agatha Lawrence was born in Copse Hill, London to father, Philip Henry Lawrence, and mother, Margaret. Agatha was the eighth of 11 children and was educated at home by her mother and older sisters. Three of her sisters, including Penelope Lawrence, founded Roedean School, Brighton. In 1889 Agatha was painted by George Frederick Watts, the painting being included in a posthumous exhibition of his work at the Royal Academy of Arts in 1905.

In 1896 she married solicitor Charles Frederick Tolme Blyth (1868–1950) in Brighton. By 1901 they were living in Hampstead. They had one son and one daughter. They later moved to Boxmoor, Hemel Hempstead.

== Girl Guides ==
Blyth started one of the first Girl Guide companies, in Hemel Hempstead. In 1911 she obtained permission for them to use one of only two pools in the area, so that they could learn to swim.

Blyth was part of the first Girl Guide committee, which had been set up by Agnes Baden-Powell, the co-founder of the movement. Blyth established and ran the Girl Guide Officers' Training School, nicknamed The Goats, training leaders from a stable in Knightsbridge, then, from June 1917, at Bryanston Place, Marylebone. Trainees would also camp at Blyth's home, Windy Sayles, in Hertfordshire. Early trainees included Fflorens Roch, Clementina Anstruther Thompson and Rose Kerr.

In 1916 Blyth wrote the book The Patrol System for Girl Guides. In the same year Lord Baden-Powell inspected one of her training camps and commended her on "the right [Guide] spirit being abundantly present." Of Blyth's approach to training it was written, "To those of us who worked with her, Mrs Blyth stands for the incarnation of the real spirit of Guiding with its mixture of idealism and fun."

The following year Blyth assisted Olave Baden-Powell, Lord Baden-Powell's wife, in writing a book about Guide training. Shortly afterwards, however, Olave Baden-Powell, recently appointed as Chief Guide, took personal charge of the training department and removed Blyth from her role. She had her husband write to say that the "spirit of the [training] school was out of harmony with the movement." Olave went on to condemn Blyth at a subsequent conference, at which Blyth wasn't present. In response, Blyth and her entire training committee resigned to be replaced by Olave's close friends. Blyth's resignation was reported in the October 1918 issue of the Girl Guides' Gazette and her head of training role was given to Agnes Maynard.

Blyth remained a member of the Girl Guide Council until 1950 but was said to have become "disillusioned and bitter" about Guiding.

== Other ==
Around the time Roedean School opened, Blyth was governess to Sir Richmond and Anne Thackeray Ritchie's children. She subsequently joined the teaching staff of Roedean, specialising in art, drama and sport. A Charter Entry at the school (more commonly known as a scholarship) was created in Blyth's name.

In 1944 Blyth donated correspondence between her sister Penelope, who had died in 1932, and the education expert Alix von Cotta to the National Archives.

Blyth supported the women's suffrage, movement and was actively involved with infant welfare organisations. She was a member of the Women's Institute.

== Bibliography ==
- de Zouche, Dorothy (1955). Roedean School: 1855-1955. Brighton, England: Dolphin Press.
- Proctor, Tammy (2002). On my honour: Guides and Scouts in interwar Britain. Philadelphia, USA: American Philosophical Society. ISBN 0871699222.
