= All Clear (disambiguation) =

All Clear is a volume of Blackout/All Clear, a science fiction novel by Connie Willis.

All Clear may also refer to:

- Operation All Clear, a military operation conducted by Royal Bhutan Army forces
- All clear, a signal given by an air raid siren to indicate that a threat has passed
