= Scouting in Greater London =

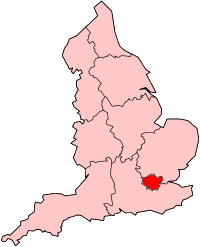

Scouting in the region of Greater London is largely represented by The Scout Association of the United Kingdom and some Groups of traditional Scouting including the Baden-Powell Scouts' Association.

The Scout Association has defined Greater London as a Scout Region with a Regional Commissioner, Richard Williams.

The Greater London Scout Region web site is londonscouts.net

There is a single member of the national Student Scout and Guide Organisation (SSAGO) covering all the universities in Greater London.

== History of Scouting in London ==
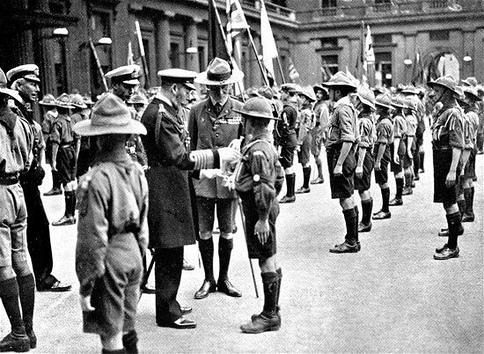
King George V and Sir Robert Baden-Powell inspect Boy Scouts at the 1909 Crystal Palace Scout Rally.

Boys from East London were amongst those invited to attend Lieutenant-General Robert Baden-Powell's experimental camp at Brownsea Island in August 1907, now regarded as the founding of the Scout Movement. Records exist of Scout Troops being started in London in late 1907, before the publication of the first installment of Baden-Powell's book, Scouting for Boys in the following January.

In March 1909, a Conference of London Scout Officials was held and at about the same time, Sir Francis Vane was appointed the first Commissioner for London of Baden-Powell Boy Scouts by Baden-Powell. Vane and Baden-Powell soon fell out over the former's antimilitarism, and he was dismissed in a dispute about renting an office for London Scouts. Vane later became the second President of the British Boy Scouts which had begun in Battersea, London. A further meeting of London Scouters in November 1909 agreed to the establishment of six Scout districts covering the County of London. Such was the size of these districts that Baden-Powell granted the commissioners in charge of them the rank of County Commissioner. This led to a degree of autonomy which prevented the formation of an effective London-wide organisation for some years, despite the appointment of an eminent London Commissioner, Sir Herbert Plumer. His successor from 1911, Major-General H B Jeffreys, had no more success in bringing the districts together, but did oversee the start of the first troops for Scouts with disabilities in London special schools.

In September 1909, the Crystal Palace Scout Rally was attended by 11,000 Scouts including a patrol of "Girl Scouts", now recognised as the founding event of Girl Guiding. London troops played a leading part in the event. In November 1909, an American publisher, William D. Boyce, was lost in a London smog, but was directed to his hotel by a Boy Scout who refused any reward; an act which led directly to the founding of the Boy Scouts of America. The Scout was never identified and is known today as the Unknown Scout.

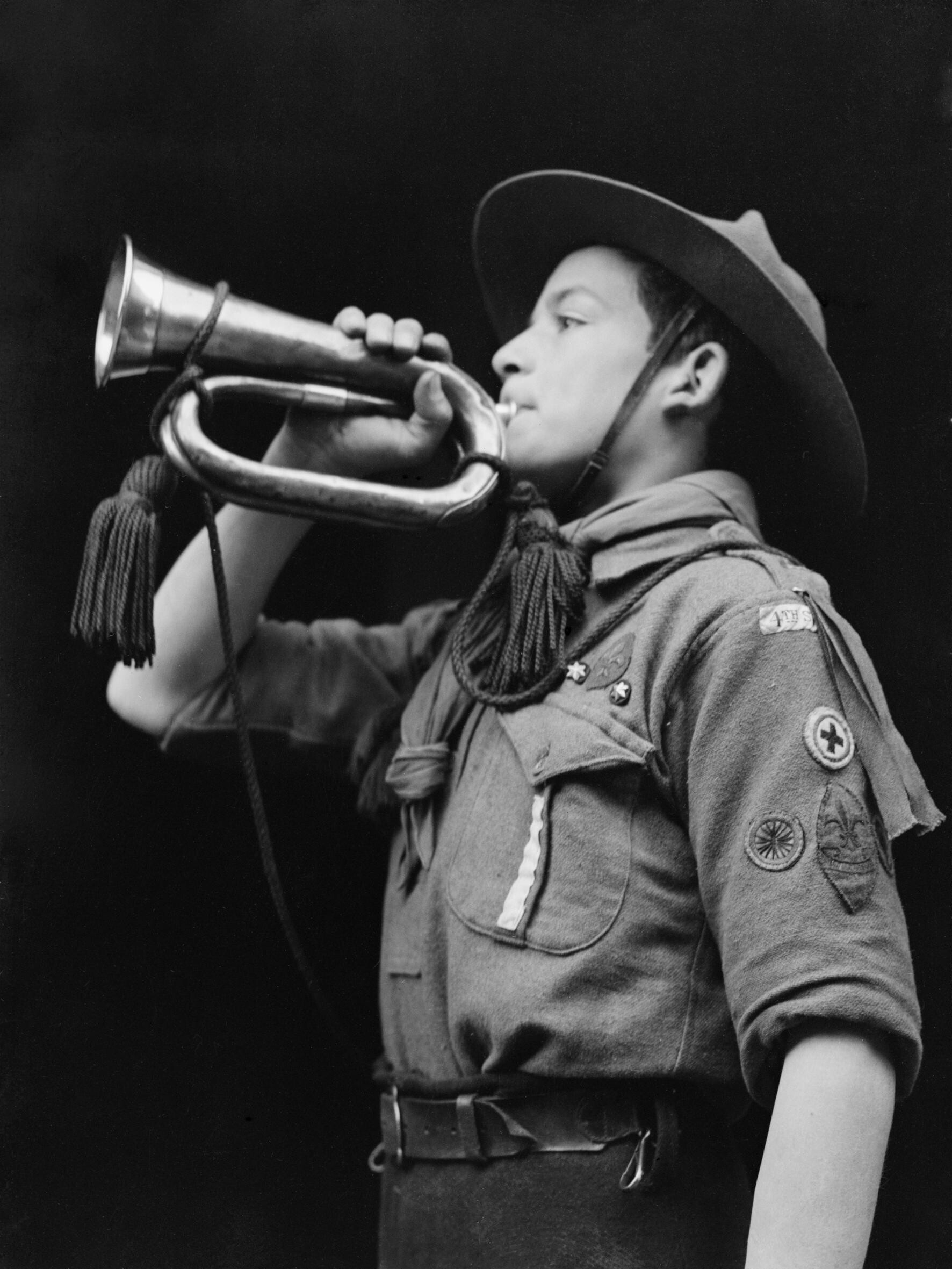
A Scout bugler sounds the "all clear" during the German bombing in the First World War.

During the First World War, London Scouts were employed in numerous roles including acting as messengers for the police and the War Office. During the German bombing of London, Scout messengers sounded the "all clear" on bugles. Sea Scouts acted as Coast Watchers.

The 1st World Scout Jamboree was held at Olympia, London in the summer of 1920. Here Baden-Powell was designated as Chief Scout of the World. In August 1924, an Imperial Jamboree was held at Wembley as part of the British Empire Exhibition. It was attended by 13,000 Scouts from many parts of the British Empire; the largest Scout camp held anywhere at that time. The event included a series of public displays inside Wembley Stadium.

In early 1932, the County Commissioner, Edward Montgomery Phillpotts, attended a revue staged by Rover Scouts from Holborn District; he suggested to the producer, Ralph Reader, that he might arrange a larger-scale production to raise funds for Scouting in London and the result was the first London Gang Show, which opened at the Scala Theatre in October of that year.

In 1939, the outbreak of the Second World War caused the evacuation of more than 21,000 London Scouts, representing more than half of the membership. The service performed by Scouts during war and particularly during air raids and the Blitz on London in World War II is recognised by their presence every year on Remembrance Day at the Cenotaph in London.

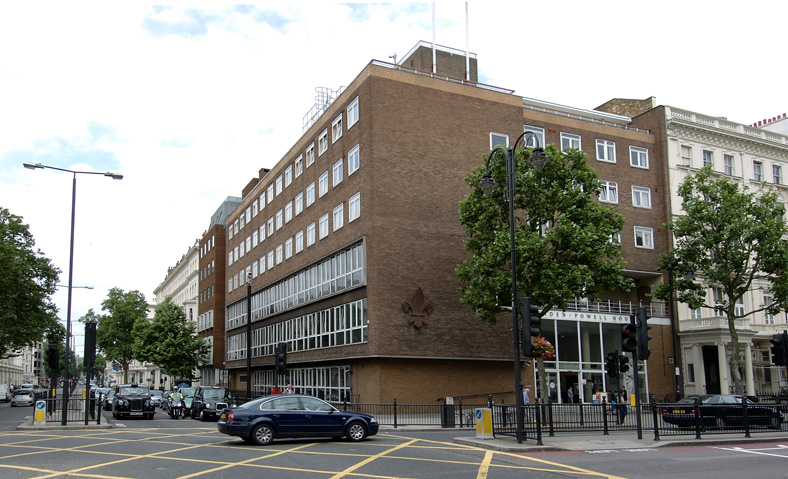
Baden-Powell House in London

In 1961, Baden-Powell House was opened in South Kensington, which included a small museum of the story of Robert Baden-Powell. In 1965, the new County of Greater London was formed; the Scout Association reorganised their boundaries accordingly, replacing the former Scout counties of London, London over the Border and Middlesex, with the seven new Scout counties (Greater London Central, North, North East, North West, South, South East and South West). Included in these new Scout counties were districts which had previously been part of the neighbouring home counties, but were now within the borders of Greater London.

London Scouts celebrated the centenary of Scouting on 1 Aug 2007 in many ways, including the New Year's Day Parade in which many Explorer Scouts were led by the Enfield District Scout Band, LIVE 07, Festival of Scouting, and a Sunrise Ceremony at the London Eye. The first UK international camp of the new Scouting century was Campdowne 2008 in July 2008, where nearly 2000 participants from the UK and 23 other countries camped at Downe Scout Activity Centre.

John May from London become the first UK Scout elected to the World Scout Committee since 1994 at the 38th World Scout Conference in Korea on 16 July 2008.

== The Scout Association Counties ==
The Scout Association in Greater London is administered through six Scout Counties.

=== Greater London Middlesex West ===
Greater London Middlesex West (GLMW), formerly known as Greater London North West, covers an area stretching from the City of Westminster in the east to Stanmore in the north, Feltham in the south and Uxbridge in the west. It serves the London Boroughs of Brent, Ealing, Harrow, Hammersmith and Fulham, Hillingdon, Hounslow, Kensington and Chelsea, and City of Westminster.

The county has 145 Scout Groups serving over 6,500 young people with 1,600 adult volunteers. It is divided into a number of districts, some of which are based approximately but not exactly around present London Borough boundaries:

- Brent
- Ealing & Hanwell
- Greenford & District
- Harrow
- Hillingdon West
- Ruislip Eastcote Northwood known as "REN"
- Thameside Grand Union, a new district which came into being in 2009, taking in the former districts of
  - Acton, Brentford and Chiswick
  - Feltham
  - Heston and Isleworth
  - The name of this district is taken from the River Thames and the Grand Union Canal, both of which flow through the area. This name was chosen rather than Hounslow district, because the Acton area falls partly in the London Borough of Ealing, although most of the district is within the London Borough of Hounslow local authority
- West London, a merger between districts that had been part of Greater London Central, a separate Scout county which was disbanded in 2004

=== Greater London North ===
Greater London North (GLN) covers an area stretching from central London directly north out to the M25. It covers the London Boroughs of Barnet, Camden, City of London, Enfield, Haringey and Islington

The county is divided into four districts with over 80 Scout Groups, as well as being responsible for the Dockland Scout Project. The 2012 census showed a total membership of 6,036 - an increase of more than 20 per cent since 2007.

- Barnet Borough - the result of a merger between three districts - Barnet, FFBGG (Finchley, Friern Barnet & Golders Green) and Hendon & Edgware
- Enfield - incorporating the previously separate Edmonton District since 2007
- North London District - formed in 2014 by the merger of Haringey with CCI (Camden, City & Islington); the latter had been part of Greater London Central until that county was disbanded in the early 2000s, with its districts being split between GLMW, GLN and GLNE.
- Southgate
- Dockland Scout Project

==== Enfield District Scout Band ====
link:http://www.edsb.org.uk

Enfield Scout District runs a traditional marching band which is open to members of the local Scout and Guide organisations.

The band was formed in 1976, and is a corps of bugles and drums. The band is a member of the Traditional Youth Marching Band Association, and competes regularly in competitions run by the Association across the UK.

Since its formation, the band has continued to lead the District as it marches through Enfield Town for the Remembrance Day and St George's Day parades which are a traditional part of the Scouting calendar.

The band is also available to play at fetes, carnivals and other parades. In recent years the band took part in the 2002, 2007, and 2008 Lord Mayor's Shows, a Royal Visit to Enfield by Her Majesty Queen Elizabeth II and Prince Philip, Duke of Edinburgh in 2003.

In 2007's Centenary of Scouting, the band took part in the London New Year's Day Parade, and played at the 21st World Scout Jamboree. In November the band formed part of the Promise Centenary Scout Band at the Lord Mayor's Show, and also played at the Scouting's Live '07 show at The O2 in Greenwich, London.

=== Greater London North East ===
Greater London North East (GLNE) covers the London boroughs of Barking and Dagenham, Hackney, Havering, Newham, Redbridge, Tower Hamlets and Waltham Forest. In 2011, the county had 8,300 members in 138 Scout Groups.

The county is divided into ten Districts:

- Barking and Dagenham
- Chingford
- East London (formerly Tower Hamlets and Hackney, which had been part of Greater London Central prior to 2004)
- Epping Forest South (covering Woodford and Wanstead)
- Hornchurch
- Ilford East
- Ilford NorthWest
- Newham
- Romford
- Waltham Forest South (formerly Leyton and Walthamstow)

=== Greater London South ===
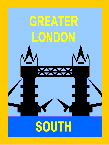
link:http://www.southlondonscouts.org.uk

Greater London South (GLS), also known as South London Scouts, covers the London Boroughs of Wandsworth, Lambeth, Southwark, Lewisham and Greenwich, an area stretching from the South Bank in the north to Thamesmead in the east, Putney in the west, to Crystal Palace in the south.

The county currently has over 4700 members + 1,900 adult volunteers, with 90 Scout Groups and 30 Explorer Scout Units, led by Darren Lodge the County Commissioner, the Deputy County Commissioners responsible for people, programme and perception and the wider County Team. The County Team is support by the County Board of Trustees.

The county is now divided into five districts which have the same boundaries as the five London Boroughs.

- Lambeth ,
- Lewisham,
- Royal Greenwich,
- Southwark
- Wandsworth

In 2024, it was announced that the GLSE and GLS Scout Counties would merge and have since been operating under the "working title" South & South East London Scouts.

The county has a centre based in Dulwich, The South London Scout Centre

=== Greater London South East ===
Greater London South East (GLSE) covers the London Boroughs of Bexley and Bromley, an area stretching from the Orpington in the southeast to Bexleyheath in the north.

From 1 October 2011 the four heritage districts of Beckenham, Bromley, Chislehurst and Orpington were merged into a new single district, called 'Bromley Scouts' (as opposed to the old 'Bromley District Scouts'). The new district is the largest Scout district (by membership) in the UK.

The county is divided into two districts:

- Bromley
- Bexley

In 2024, it was announced that the GLSE and GLS Scout Counties would merge and have since been operating under the "working title" South & South East London Scouts.

=== Greater London South West ===
Greater London South West (GLSW) covers an area stretching from Sanderstead in the South East to Hampton and Whitton in the North West.

The county is divided into five districts which have the same boundaries as the five London Boroughs:

- Croydon
- Richmond upon Thames
- Royal Kingston
- Sutton
- Wimbledon and Wandle (Merton)

The county has three Scout Bands, Kingston & Malden Scout and Guide Band, 1st Hook Scout and Guide Band and Wimbledon, Wandle and Sutton District's Scout and Guide Band.

== Activity Centres and Camp sites ==
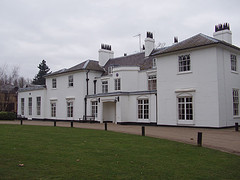
The White House at Gilwell Park

Three of the six Scout Association Activity Centres are in Greater London. Baden-Powell House is a hostel and conference centre in central London. Gilwell Park is a camp site and activity centre, as well as a training and conference centre for Scout Leaders. It is close to Chingford, London. The White House at Gilwell Park has been the headquarters of The Scout Association since 2001, although Baden-Powell House (the former headquarters) still facilitates some departments of the Scout Association. Downe Scout Activity Centre is in Kent, but was owned by the Greater London South East Scouts from 1987 to 2005, when the site became under the direct control of The Scout Association. Downe was closed during the 2020 pandemic and is now up for sale on the open market, after several community groups failed to raise enough money to save it.

Greater London Middlesex West is responsible for the PACCAR Chalfont Heights campsite 30 minutes from London at Chalfont St Peter in Buckinghamshire. Originally purchased in 1938, it was operated by Scout Headquarters until 1970 when it taken over by the Greater London Middlesex West County as its County campsite and Training Centre. The current name was adopted following major sponsorship from a charitable foundation owned by PACCAR Inc, the multi-national heavy vehicle manufacturer. Ealing & Hanwell District in GLMW own and run the Walter Davies Activity Centre near Stoke Poges, and the City of Westminster Scout District is responsible for Coombe Farm Campsite, located in Addington.

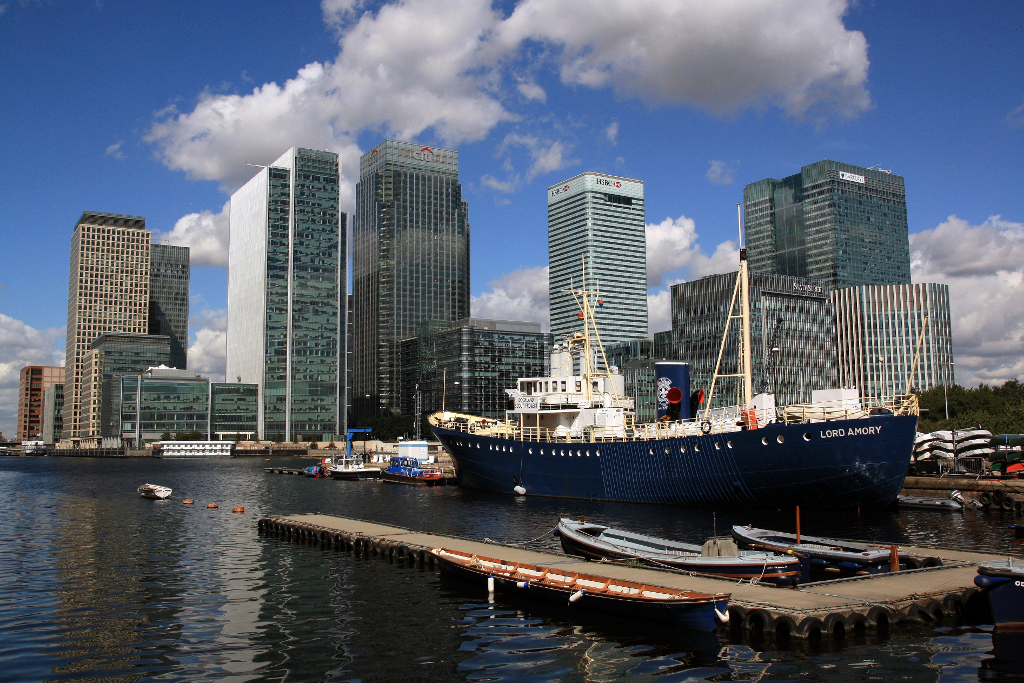
The Docklands Scout Project and HQTS Lord Amory in West India Dock.

Districts in Greater London North own or operate campsites and activity centres at: Danemead Scout Campsite near Broxbourne (Enfield District, with Chingford District of Greater London NE), Scout Park at Bounds Green (North London District) and Frith Grange near Mill Hill (Barnet Borough District). The Training ship RRS Discovery, Captain Scott's Antarctic expedition vessel, moored on Victoria Embankment near Temple Underground station, was used by London Sea Scouts between 1937 and 1979, when it was handed over to Maritime Trust and relocated in Dundee. The Dockland Scout Project was then created. Based on the Lord Amory, the only permanently moored Scout 'campsite' in the UK, the DSP is located in the West India Dock, east of the City of London and opposite Greenwich across the River Thames.

Districts in Greater London North East own or operate campsites and activity centres at: Crow Camp near Noak Hill (Romford District), Fairmead Scout Campsite near High Beach (East London District), Hargreaves Scout Campsite, Little Heath (Ilford East District), and the Michael Mallinson Centre, Highams Park (Waltham Forest South District).

Greater London South owns the South London Scout Centre, the closest camping centre to central London at Dulwich. Also known as "The Fort" it was the site of an ant-aircraft gun battery during the Second World War and has been used by Scouts since 1961. Hammerwood Scout Campsite, located in East Grinstead, is owned and operated by 6 Groups in Lewisham; it has 27 acres (110,000 m^{2}) of woodland plus a field. The forest is mostly unpartitioned with an unmanaged area for survival training weekends and is popular with Scout, Cadet and Duke of Edinburgh groups. Lewisham Scout District is responsible for Frylands Wood Scout Campsite in Croydon. Royal Greenwich District also operate 3 campsites two within the district: Avery Hill Scout Activity Centre located in the former New Eltham district and the ExNet centre named after the explorer and network sections in scouting. There is also a campsite located in the village of Downe, Kent called Eleven acres Scout Camp

Wilberforce Scout Centre in Keston is owned by Bromley Scout District, and Cudham Shaws Site (previously a Guide Association site) is run by Bexley Scout District, both of the Greater London South East Scout Association County.

Yr Hen Neuadd ('The Old Hall'), Bethesda, Gwynedd, North Wales, originally a Salvation Army Hall, was converted in 1970 by Greater London South West as an Activity Centre. Other sites owned or operated by districts within Greater London South West include the Bears Wood Training Centre in Croydon and Pinewood Campsite in Shirley (both Croydon District), also Polyapes Campsite at Stoke d'Abernon, which lies just outside the county boundaries but is managed jointly between Royal Kingston and Esher Districts and has been in continuous use since 1929.

== 21st World Scout Jamboree ==
There were 36 Scouts from Greater London North taking part in the 21st World Scout Jamboree in August 2007. The Enfield District Scout Band played at the Closing Ceremony.

The Greater London North East Scout County sent forty-five Scouts to the 21st World Scout Jamboree. Thirty six, plus four leaders, acted as a whole contingent while the remaining nine were part of another contingent with Guides from Cambridge and a Scout troop from Montserrat.

Two contingents from the Greater London South East Scout County attended.

Greater London South West (GLSW) had two full contingents (of 36 Scouts plus 4 leaders each) named Victory Unit and Nelson Unit. GLSW Additionally provided a patrol (9 Scouts) and the overall unit leader in the most diverse unit at the jamboree, consisting of 25% GLSW Scouts, 25% Scouts from Fife in Scotland, 25% Guides from Somerset and 25% Scouts from Mauritania in North Africa. This unit was named The Discovery Unit. Two of the unit were present at the Sunrise Ceremony on Brownsea Island to welcome the 2nd century of Scouting at the movement's birthplace.

Wimbledon, Wandle & Sutton District's, Kingston & Malden the 1st Hook and 2nd Hook Scout Bands played at the closing ceremony.

== Gang Shows ==
- Southwark Gang Show in Greater London South, started 1950. Originally named Bermondsey Gang Show, then Thameside Gang Show, then Albany Gang Show
- SOUWEST Gang Show in Sutton - started 1982. Greater London South West Scout County.
- ShowStoppers Gang Show. Greater London North East Scouts Gang Show. Started 2003.
- Erith and Crayford "CAPERS" Gang Show.
- Greenford Gang Show - started in 1953.
- 1st Leyton Scout Group Gang Show, started in 1947.
- Waltham Forest Gang Show - started in 1959. This was formerly Walthamstow Gang Show.
- 2nd Whitton Scout Group Gang Show - started in 1951.
- Woolwich Gang Show (known as Showtime) - started in 1954.
- Greenwich Gang Show (known as OurShow)

== See also ==
- Girlguiding London and South East England
