= Kingston Vale =

District in Kingston upon Thames, London

Coordinates: 51.4294°N 0.2513°W

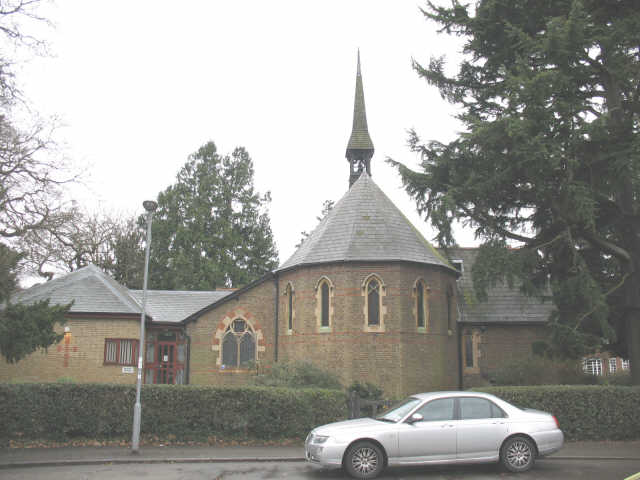
- St. John the Baptist church, built 1861, is one of the oldest buildings in the district

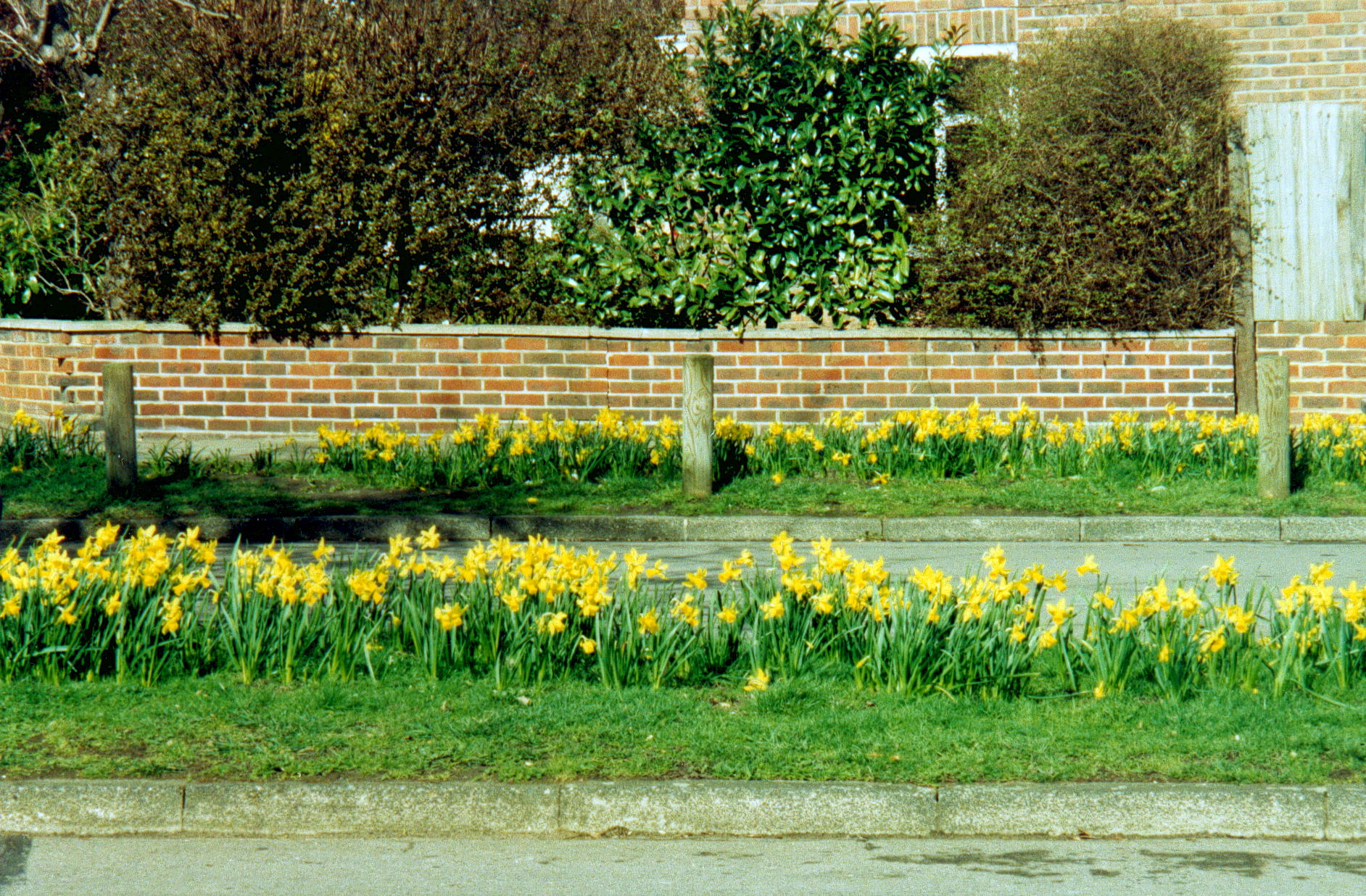
- By most roads of Kingston Vale are trees and shrubbery and in some cases daffodil-growing grass verges

- Location within Greater London
- OS grid reference: TQ215715
- London borough: Kingston
- Ceremonial county: Greater London
- Region: London
- Country: England
- Sovereign state: United Kingdom
- Post town: LONDON
- Postcode district: SW15
- Dialling code: 020
- Police: Metropolitan
- Fire: London
- Ambulance: London
- UK Parliament: Richmond Park Putney
- London Assembly: South West

Kingston Vale with Kingston Hill is a district in the Royal Borough of Kingston upon Thames in south-west London. It is a residential area between Richmond Park, the much smaller Putney Vale, Wimbledon Common, Coombe/Coombe Hill and the Norbiton part of the very old borough. The main road is the A308 (also called Kingston Vale and Kingston Hill) which is a through route for traffic passing to and from Kingston Hill to the A3 trunk road (locally known as the Kingston By-pass). Many of the branch roads are cul-de-sacs. It includes, toward the east and in the Vale, the only part of Kingston which drains eastward, that is, into Beverley Brook. The hill expanse, shared with Coombe and a golf course, has a hotel, some tall blocks overlooking Kingston, the edge of Kingston Hospital, the main campus of Kingston University London and faint remnants of dense woodland. Kingston Vale shares its SW15 postcode with neighbouring Roehampton and Putney.

== History ==
An inn, the Bald-Faced Stag, stood on the site of the present day Asda from around 1650 into the 19th century. The inn was reputedly a haunt of the highwayman Jerry Abershawe until his execution in 1795, after which his body was displayed in a gibbet at Putney Vale.

=== Etymology ===
The vale part was little-inhabited and known as Kingston Bottom until the middle of the 19th century; the name is featured in a variety of documents dating from 1791 to c. 1850. The Last Will and Testament of one Philip Cawston, dated 26 September 1791, refers to his ownership of the Robin Hood premises in Kingston Bottom; the name also features in maps and wills held by the National Archives dating from 1791 to 1856.

The earliest record of the new name Kingston Vale occurs in the 1861 Census Returns, where the area is referred to as 'Kingston Vale Hamlet'. By the time of the 1891 Census, the area is described as a 'civil parish, township or place' under the name of 'Kingston Vale'. A detailed summary of Kingston of 1848 names the recent new churches and describes the one erected in this neighbourhood as "at Robinhood-Gate".

=== Robin Hood Place Names ===
The name of Robin Hood has long been associated with the Kingston Vale area which is close to the Robin Hood Gate of Richmond Park (the name of the gate appearing in records from at least 1785, and a nearby "Robynhood Walke" and "Robyn-hodes Walke" in 1548). Maps of the areas also show Robin Hood Lane and the Robin Hood Inn (later the Robin Hood Pub until it was converted into residential property) as early as 1874. The association with Robin Hood is thought to have arisen from the Robin Hood plays and the May Day Games put on in Richmond Park for the entertainment of Henry VIII.

=== The Kingsnympton Park Estate ===
The Kingsnympton Park Estate was originally part of "The Knoll", a large house with extensive grounds along Kingston Hill next to Richmond Park. In 1881 it was the scene of the Kingston Hill Murder. The house was then owned by Harry Powys-Keck of Stoughton Grange, Leicestershire.

In 1914 Mr Crowther built his mansion, "Haygreen", named after his Yorkshire village and described "as one of the grandest of stately homes that once graced Kingston." The grounds included a golf course, lakes and Dutch gardens. Haygreen Close is named to remember the connection.

In 1927 Mr F. N. Picket purchased the house and he renamed it "Kingsnympton Hall" after his Devon village, King's Nympton.

The estate was then owned by Mr Maneckji B. Dadabhoy of Nagpur. He installed the automated wrought iron entrance gates by South Lodge; the roundels have his intertwined initials "MBD". It was leased for a time by Montague Burton.

The estate was bombed in 1940. The house was demolished and then purchased by the council for housing.

== Transport ==
=== Road ===
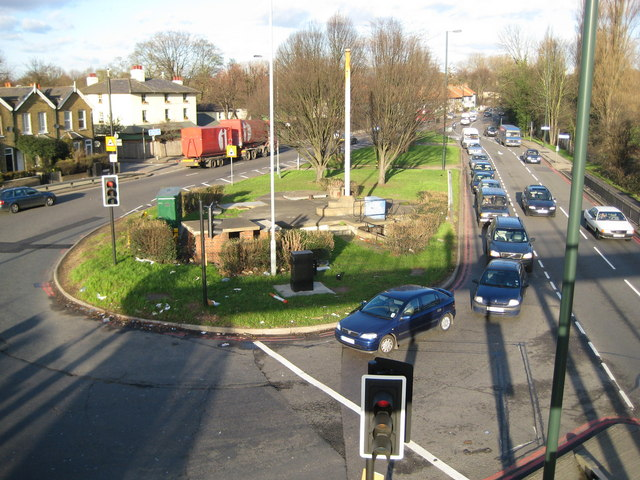
The Robin Hood roundabout

Kingston Vale is located north-east of Kingston on the A308; the village straddles both the A308 and the A3 London–Portsmouth Road. The closest junction of the A3 is the Robin Hood Roundabout, which is located at the north-eastern end of the village.

=== Bus ===
Kingston Vale is served by three local bus routes, connecting the village with New Malden and Tolworth to the south, Kingston and Surbiton to the south-west and Roehampton and Putney to the north-east. The bus routes serving Kingston Vale are as follows:

- 85 – Kingston to Putney, via Norbiton, Kingston Vale and Roehampton
- 265 – Tolworth to Putney, via New Malden, Coombe, Kingston Vale, Roehampton and Barnes
- K3 – Esher to Roehampton Vale, via Claygate, Long Ditton, Surbiton, Kingston, Norbiton and Kingston Vale

=== Rail ===
Kingston Vale is not directly accessible by rail; the nearest stations are Norbiton to the south-west, and Putney and Barnes to the north-east. Bus connections are also available within a short walk of the stations at Kingston, New Malden, Surbiton, Tolworth and Barnes.

=== Tube ===
The nearest Tube station is East Putney station on the District line to the east, with direct bus connections to Kingston Vale on routes 85 and 265. An indirect connection with South Wimbledon station on the Northern line is also possible, via New Malden, Kingston or Roehampton.

== Education ==
The vale has its own primary school, the Robin Hood Primary School. The hill hosts Kingston Hill Campus of Kingston University. The Parish Halls play host to a Montessori nursery school and a children's dancing school –the Kingston Vale Dance Academy.

== Housing ==
The bulk of the housing in Kingston Vale was built by the private sector. Most were built before the 1970s, with many houses along Kingston Hill going back to the 1840s. This older stock is typically ornate, well landscaped in small grounds, with some converted into apartments.

A Topographic Dictionary of England published in 1848 describes the area as:
...from the excellent situation of the place...from the pleasing scenery with which the neighbourhood abounds, and from the salubrity of the air, the district promises to become of some importance.

== Politics ==
Kingston Vale is within the Parliamentary Constituency of Richmond Park (UK Parliament constituency). This was won by the Liberal Democrats in the 2019 General Election, but has mainly been a Conservative and Liberal Democrat marginal seat since the seat was created in 1997.

== Religious sites ==
=== St. John the Baptist Anglican church ===
The first church in the area was built in 1839 and became the centre of its own Parish in 1847. Its replacement is the Parish Church of St. John the Baptist on Robin Hood Lane. It was consecrated on 22 July 1861, and was completed in 1886 by the addition of the Choir Vestry. It was built on land given by the Duke of Cambridge, using funds donated by Princess Mary, Duchess of Gloucester and Edinburgh (a daughter of George III) and others. It is an Anglican church in the Deanery of Kingston and the Archdiocese of Southwark. In addition to its religious functions, the church acts as a focal point for community activities, such as social clubs, table tennis and space for parties and local associations. Every year the Church holds a summer fete and a fireworks night on varying dates. The Parish Office manages the booking of four halls (three on the site at St. John's and the Village Hall).

Princess Mary Adelaide, Duchess of Teck who, as a resident in White Lodge in Richmond Park, was a frequent worshipper in the church and laid the foundation stone for the North Aisle.

A Pathé newsreel from 1935 shows a society wedding at the church between Leslie Stoll (son of Putney resident Oswald Stoll) and Gertrude Sabey who had met at the nearby riding school.

=== St. Ann's Roman Catholic Church, Kingston Hill ===
This is a 1960s neo-Georgian brick church with a brick campanile giving it an Italianate touch.

== Culture and recreation ==
=== Sports ===
Kingston Vale is almost surrounded by open spaces, much reflected in the range of local activities; the east of the village/suburbs hosts Stag Lodge Stables, for horse-riding in adjoining Richmond Park and Wimbledon Common. The Richardson Evans Memorial Playing Fields, adjacent to Wimbledon Common, hosts many sporting activities including Saturday/Sunday league football teams, as well as number of annual schools' rugby and women's football tournaments. It is the home ground of London Cornish RFC.

=== Community activities ===
An active local amenity group, the Kingston Vale Residents Association (KVRA), is a democratic body which deals with matters such as planning, conservation, transport, environment and social. The association's newsletter is called the Bottom Line, taking its name from the original Middle Ages name of the vale part of the area: Kingston Bottom.

Kingston Vale's halls are used to host a variety of community activities including an art club, the local theatre group, a coffee club, meetings of the Residents' Association and many open-door events.

The Kingston Vale Operatic Society (later Kingston Vale Operatic and Dramatic Society) was founded by local residents in 1943. Their first show was Gilbert and Sullivan's Trial by Jury at the Kingston Vale Village Hall in 1943. The group continued operating in the area until the late 2000s when the old village hall was converted to residential property but continues operating in the wider Kingston area.

The village has a self-managed allotment site, which caters to some 60 plot holders from around the Borough and organises a range of social events.

=== Museum ===
The Dorich House Museum, a museum of sculpture and Imperial Russian art, is run both as a museum and a conference centre by Kingston University.

=== Cultural events ===
The playing fields host the annual Pongu Tamil event for the London area, a community rally attracting some 30,000 members of the British Tamil community.

== Notable people ==
- George Carey – ex-Archbishop of Canterbury
- John Galsworthy – author and Nobel prize winner
- Dora Gordine – sculptor
- Vanessa Greene – screenwriter and film producer
- Rich Johnston – cartoonist and writer
- Lily Langtry – Mistress of Edward VII lived in a house on Kingston Hill.
- Ronnie Wood – member of the Rolling Stones. Between 1997-2008 he lived in the former hunting lodge of Queen Victoria on Kingston Hill.
- Florence Nightingale - nursing pioneer, was a regular visitor to her aunt's home, Coombe Hurst, now part of the Kingston University campus
