= Thomas's London Day Schools =

Group of private preparatory schools in London

Thomas's London Day Schools (also known as Thomas's Preparatory Schools and Thomas's) are four co-educational private preparatory schools and one senior School in London, United Kingdom. They are located in Kensington, Battersea, Clapham and Fulham and Richmond as well as a kindergarten in Battersea. They are a family-run establishment, and have come to be seen as a feeder for major British public schools such as Eton, Harrow, Brighton College, Marlborough, Westminster, Alleyn's School, City of London, Dulwich, Radley, and King's College School.

== History ==
Thomas's was founded in 1971 when Joanna Thomas, an actress and mother of three young children, started the Ranelagh Kindergarten in a Pimlico church hall (now Thomas's Kindergarten, Pimlico). Six years later, the success of the Kindergarten and the demand for London day schools of quality encouraged David Thomas, a former Gurkha Regiment officer, to join his wife in founding a school for older children. Following the acquisition of a building in Cadogan Gardens in 1977, the "Kensington Court Lower School" came into being with two teachers and 11 pupils. In less than four years the school, now named "Thomas's", had over 200 children. Demand for places continued to increase and, in response, Thomas's expanded in 1981 into two buildings in Cottesmore Gardens, just south of Kensington Gardens, to create Thomas's, Kensington. The buildings are of the Victorian era.

By the end of 1989 the Preparatory School at Cadogan Gardens needed more space and in August 1990 the freehold was acquired of the former Sir Walter St John's School in Battersea. The school, which became Thomas's, Battersea, moved to new premises in October 1990 and the leasehold buildings in Cadogan Gardens were sold. In September 1992 Thomas's Kindergarten, Battersea was started in the crypt of St Mary's Church. At the end of 1992, with an increasing demand for places, the freehold was secured of the former Walsingham School, previously Clapham County Girls' School, in Broomwood Road and the new Thomas's, Clapham opened in September 1993.

In September 1995, David and Joanna Thomas's two sons, Tobyn and Ben, were appointed Principals, having worked in the schools for a number of years. In June 1998, a charitable foundation was formed. The aims of the charity, Thomas's Schools Foundation, are to assist certain parents financially with the education of their children and to run local community projects. In 1999, David and Joanna Thomas retired from active management of the schools, which are now run by Tobyn and Ben. In 2000 and 2001, a £4m construction programme was carried out to enhance the facilities at Thomas's, Clapham and Thomas's, Battersea. In 2002, an opportunity arose to improve Thomas's, Kensington through the acquisition of a nearby school, Lady Eden's. Lady Eden's was closed in Summer 2002 and its buildings converted to become the Lower School of Thomas's, Kensington. The existing buildings in Cottesmore Gardens were refurbished and now house the Preparatory School. The premises of Thomas's, Kensington are freehold.

In 2004, Thomas's acquired a long lease on the buildings formerly owned by the London Institute for the Chelsea College of Art and Design in Hugon Road, Fulham. The school, which overlooks South Park, Fulham, was built from 1892 and could educate 1,200 children. The buildings have 35,000 square feet (3,300 m^{2}) and are set on a 1-acre (4,000 m^{2}) site. A £1.3m refurbishment programme by the landlords commenced in January 2005 and Thomas's, Fulham opened in September 2005 as a co-educational preparatory school for children from 4 to 11 years old.

In 2019 Thomas’s acquired a school site in Putney Vale from Hall School Wimbledon to provide further teaching space for all four Thomas’s preparatory schools. Opening in September 2021, this housed Thomas’s Senior School. Thomas's Putney Vale closed in July 2025, staff and students transferred to the new site, Thomas's College in Richmond.

In 2020 Thomas's Battersea was recognized by The Schools Index as one of the world's 100 leading schools and one of top 10 prep schools in the UK.

In April 2023, the group appointed Oakley Capital as an investor to finance developments across its sites. Oakley took a minority equity stake in the company.

== School culture ==
The school employs a team of chefs who prepare vegan, vegetarian, fish, gluten-free and dairy options. The meals are nut-free and minimise salt and sugar. Examples of lunches include chicken and chorizo jambalaya, chicken katsu curry, crushed potato and sausages, and a baked potato option available for every lunchtime. The school participates in meat-free Fridays part of the Meatless Monday campaign. The school's menus change every three weeks to reflect the seasons. In 2022, dishes served at the school by the catering company Radish were reported to include cheddar and caramelized red onion quiche, vegetable and bean jambalaya, and roast chicken served with stuffing.

== Royal connections ==
=== Students ===
On 24 March 2017, it was announced that Prince George of Cambridge would attend Thomas's Battersea from 7 September 2017. Maud Windsor, Prince George's third cousin once removed, also began attending Thomas's Battersea on the same day. They were joined by Prince George's younger sister Princess Charlotte of Cambridge on 5 September 2019.

=== Security concerns ===
A few days before Prince George began attending the school, local resident Sarah Burnett-Moore pointed out security concerns by filming herself walking into and around the school without being challenged.

In October 2017, Islamic State supporter Husnain Rashid posted a photograph of Prince George along with his school's address, a silhouette of a jihad fighter and the message: "Even the royal family will not be left alone" in a Telegram chat group. Rashid was later given a life sentence with a minimum of 25 years for his actions in July 2018.

== Notable students ==
Current:

- Miss Maud Windsor, daughter of Lord Frederick Windsor

Former:

- Princess Charlotte of Cambridge
- Prince George of Cambridge
- Cara Delevingne
- Florence Welch
