= Putney Vale =

Community in Wandsworth, London, England

Coordinates: 51.440°N 0.242°W

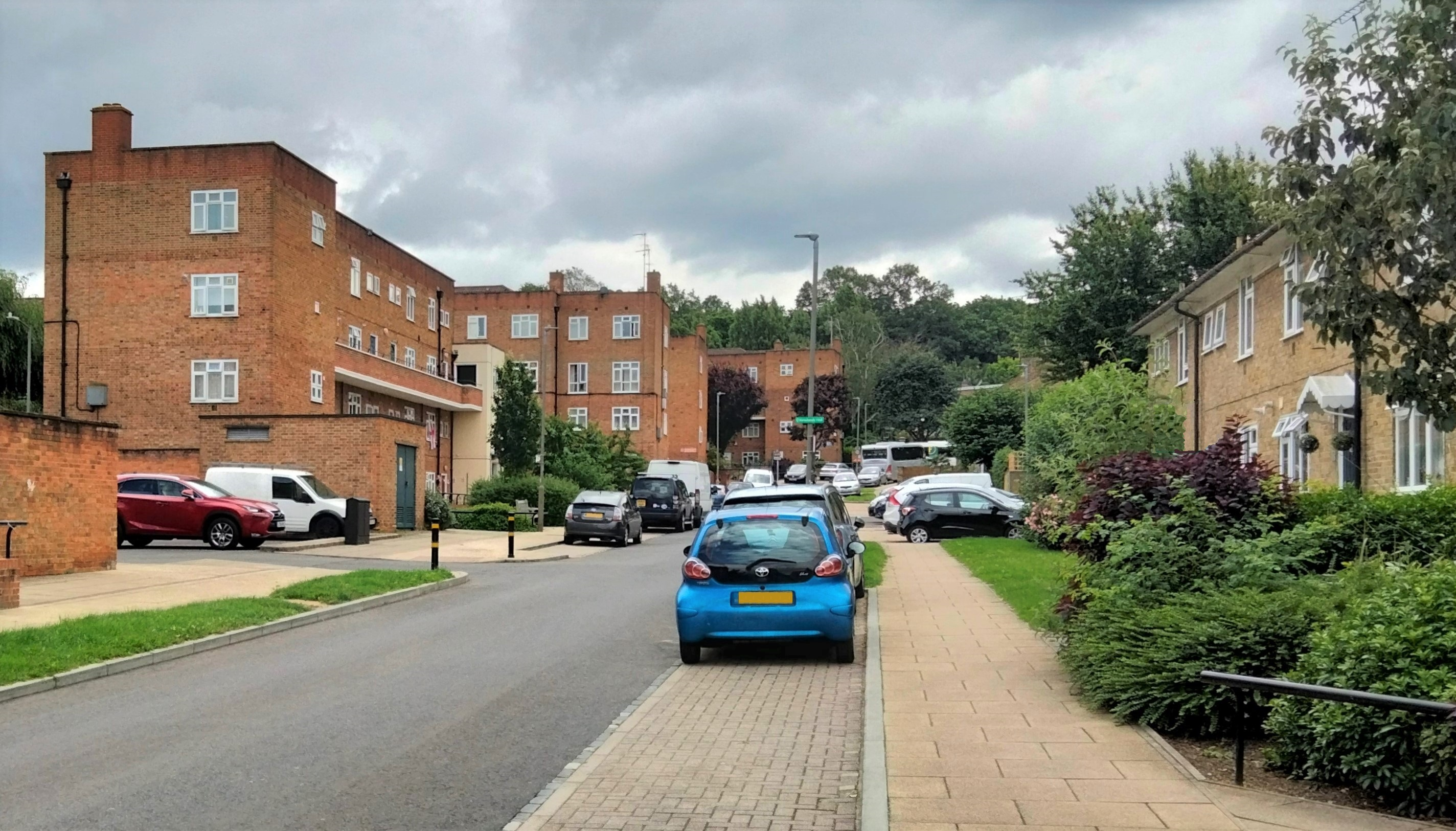
- Stroud Crescent, Putney Vale Estate. 2021

- Location within Greater London
- London borough: Wandsworth
- Ceremonial county: Greater London
- Region: London
- Country: England
- Sovereign state: United Kingdom
- Post town: LONDON
- Postcode district: SW15
- Dialling code: 020
- Police: Metropolitan
- Fire: London
- Ambulance: London
- UK Parliament: Putney
- London Assembly: Merton and Wandsworth

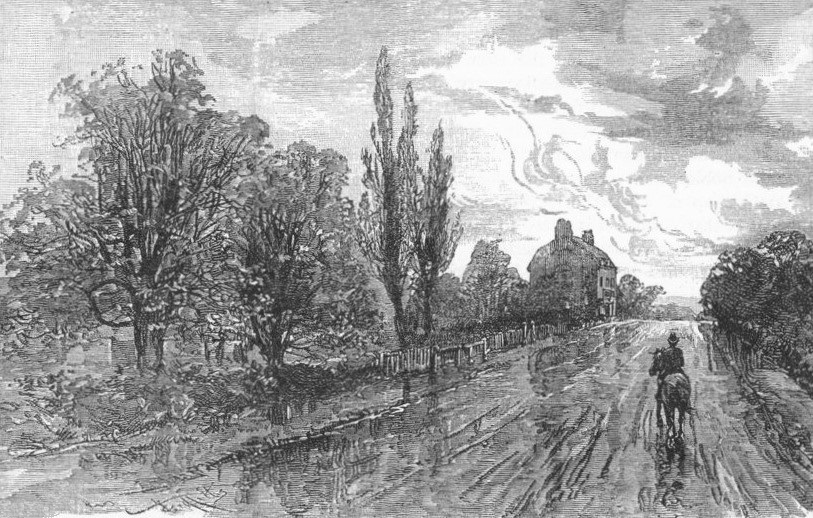
The Portsmouth Road, showing the Bald Faced Stag Inn, 1888

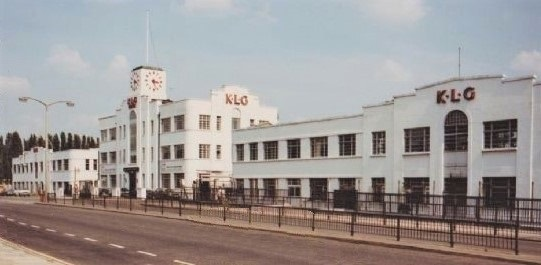
KLG factory at Putney Vale. Demolished 1989. Now an ASDA superstore.

Putney Vale is a small community in south west London. It lies between Richmond Park and Wimbledon Common, to the east of Beverley Brook and Kingston Vale. Its main features are a housing estate, a superstore and a large cemetery. The A3 dual carriageway runs through it.

== Description ==
=== Political geography ===
Putney Vale is part of the London Borough of Wandsworth and is currently within Roehampton ward and Putney Parliamentary constituency. In the Church of England, it has been a part of Roehampton parish since its separation from Putney parish in 1845.

=== Housing ===
Most of the housing is provided by an estate built in the mid-1950s, on land originally earmarked for a possible cemetery extension. It consists of local authority-built (mainly duplex, four-storey) maisonettes and short terraces. Many homes are now privately owned, with the balance owned and let by the Borough. The estate's curved access road, Stag Lane, has a row of shops.

There is further privately owned housing beside the A3, and on Friars Avenue – built in 1983 – adjacent to playing fields and Wimbledon Common.

== Amenities ==
The non-denominational Putney Vale Cemetery and Crematorium, in which a number of well-known people are buried, is north and east of the housing estate. Covering 47 acres, it was established in 1891 and the crematorium in 1938.

Beaver's Holt Primary School on the estate was closed in 1992 due to falling roll numbers. It was then sold to the private Hall School Wimbledon to house its junior branch. In 2019 the site was sold to Thomas's London Day Schools to provide further teaching space for all four of its preparatory schools.

Kingston University's Roehampton Vale campus is situated beside the A3. It has facilities for students on engineering courses.

Shortly before the First World War, 175 acres were added to Wimbledon Common, including much of Newlands Farm, which had been here since the Middle Ages. The extension also created extensive playing fields at Putney Vale named the Richardson Evans Memorial Playing Fields in honour of the scheme's sponsor, Richardson Evans. The fields host Saturday/Sunday league football teams, as well as number of annual schools' rugby and women's football tournaments. It is the home ground of London Cornish RFC.

Allotment fruit and vegetable gardens, let by the Borough, are to the south-west of the housing estate.

An Asda superstore is situated beside the A3.

== History ==
The lower part of Putney Vale, nearer Beverley Brook, was known as Putney Bottom until the mid-nineteenth century.

There are four Wimbledon Common rangers' cottages on Stag Lane and Friars Avenue. On the north east side of the playing fields, Stag Lane becomes a track called Kings Ride. The origin of the Kings Ride name is believed to date from when Henry VIII, while chasing deer from Richmond Park would pursue them onto the common before the wall to the park was built.

The first significant building in Putney Vale was the Halfway House, later the Bald Faced Stag, an Inn established about 1650 on the corner of Stags lane and the Portsmouth Road (now the A3). In the eighteenth century the road here was a well-known spot for robbers. The inn was reputedly a haunt of the highwayman Jerry Abershawe until his execution in 1795, after which his body was displayed in a gibbet at Putney Vale.

In 1912 Kenelm Lee Guinness, a member of the brewing dynasty and a motor racer, acquired the by-then disused Bald Faced Stag inn, where he developed a more efficient sparking plug for use in car and aircraft engines. Small-scale production began at the former inn, and by 1914 Guinness was producing 4,000 plugs a week. The First World War led to an increase in demand, and in 1916 the company was incorporated as KLG. In 1917 larger premises, known as the Robin Hood Engineering Works, were opened to the east of the old premises. This employed over 1,200 mainly women workers, making the factory the largest employer in the area. By 1918, the bulk of the factory's output was reserved for the Royal Air Force.

In 1919 Guinness sold the firm's distribution rights to S. Smith & Sons. In the inter-war years KLG sparking plugs made at Putney Vale were used in the majority of British cars. This included Henry Segrave's Golden Arrow and Malcolm Campbell's Blue Bird series, which set world land speed records. In 1927 Smith & Sons bought KLG and in the 1930s built a new spark plug factory, in an Art Deco style, on the Putney Vale site. The factory was demolished in 1989 and replaced by an Asda superstore. Asda donated the old factory gates, bearing the KLG logo, to the Brooklands Motor Museum.

== Surroundings ==
Beyond relatively large green buffers – playing fields, a golf course, Richmond Park, Wimbledon Common and Putney Heath – and beyond adjoining Roehampton Vale, are:

- Roehampton Village
- Putney
- Kingston Vale, with Norbiton and Kingston upon Thames beyond
- Copse Hill, associated with Raynes Park
- Coombe Hill or Coombe, associated with New Malden
- Wimbledon Park, associated with Wimbledon Village
