= East Sussex (disambiguation) =

East Sussex is a ceremonial county in South East England.

East Sussex or Sussex East may also refer to:

- East Sussex (UK Parliament constituency), 1832–1885
- Sussex East (European Parliament constituency), 1979–1994
- Sussex East, a Girlguiding county
