= Girlguiding London and South East England =

Girlguiding London and South East England is one of the nine regions and counties of Girlguiding. The region headquarters is in Wandsworth Common, London. The current Chief Commissioner is Amanda Tessel.

== Counties ==
Girlguiding London and South East England is subdivided into 19 Girlguiding counties. These do not correspond to the counties defined by the British government.

=== Sussex Central ===
Source: Girlguiding Sussex Central was formed in 1979, when the county of West Sussex was re-organised due to the expansion of Girlguiding. It was created on 1 April 1979 with Mrs. Sylvia Smith as the County Commissioner, later to become County President.

The county, which broadly covers the Mid Sussex area of South East England, consists of eight Divisions: Burgess Hill, Crawley, East Grinstead, Haywards Heath, Horsham, Parkminster, South Down, and Worth, and is part of Girlguiding London and South East England Region (LaSER).

Membership in Sussex Central is about 4,000 and supported by volunteers, many of whom are also members of the Trefoil Guild.

County ambassadors, whose role it is to actively promote guiding, are The Lord Dholakia of Waltham Brooks, Mrs. Loder of Leonardslee, Horsham, Chris Connors (Director CoCos Hair Salons/Trustee CoCos Foundation), Henry Smith MP (Crawley), Richard Spurgeon (Manager at South Lodge). Division Ambassadors are recruited locally.

Each year there are special events around the county, including the Rainbow's 25th birthday celebrations at Blackland Farm. Every four years Guides join with West Sussex Scouts and Sussex West Guides for an international camp "WS".

=== Sussex East ===
Sussex East Guide County is subdivided into 11 Divisions:

- Bexhill
- Brighton East
- Brighton West
- Eastbourne
- Hastings and St Leonards
- Hove
- Lewes
- Rother
- Rye
- Seahaven
- Weald

The county President is The Countess De La Warr, wife of Earl De La Warr

The Sussex East silk shows six gold martlets (little birds) and two gold lines on a red diamond. The six martlets represent the six "rapes" or divisions of land in Sussex: Hastings, Pevensey, Lewes, Bramber, Chichester and Arundal. The two gold lines represent the rivers Rother and Ouse which mark the East and West boundaries.

=== London Over The Border ===
This county broadly covers the London boroughs of Waltham Forest, Redbridge, Barking and Dagenham and Newham.

=== Croydon ===
Girlguiding Croydon County encompasses the London Borough of Croydon and comprises four small divisions.

- Norths
- Fairfield
- Huntingfield
- Purley

== Properties ==
=== Chigwell Row Guide Campsite ===
Chigwell Row Guide Campsite is set in 56 acres (230,000 m^{2}) of grassland near to Hainault Forest Country Park. There are large areas dedicated to camping. There are also three indoor accommodation buildings: Oaklands Lodge, Jubilee House and The Bungalow.

=== The Shaws Guide Camp Site ===
The Shaws Guide Camp Site in Kent has facilities for both camping and indoor accommodation.

=== Paxmead Riverside Base ===
Paxmead Riverside Base is the region's boating centre. It is located on the River Thames at Shepperton, Middlesex. Canoeing, kayaking, sailing and rowing equipment is available to youth organisations. Both indoor and camping accommodation is available.

=== Jordan Heights ===
Jordan Heights is a secluded campsite near Reigate. It was once a hillside garden for a member of the Royal Society. During World War II, it was used as an army pigeon loft. In 2011 the local Scout Association District of Reigate took over the site.

== 1st Buckingham Palace Company ==
The 1st Buckingham Palace Guide Company was formed to allow the then Princess Elizabeth to be a Girl Guide. It met for the first time on 9 June 1937. At this meeting, Princess Elizabeth was elected second of the Kingfisher Patrol with Patricia Mountbatten as her patrol leader. There were twenty Guides, who were children of members of the royal household and Palace employees. They met at a summerhouse in the garden. During World War II, the group went into abeyance for a short time, but was re-opened at Windsor in 1942. The captain of the Company was Violet Synge. A Brownie Pack was also opened at the same time for Princess Margaret. It had 14 members.

The 1st Buckingham Palace Company was reformed in 1959 for Princess Anne. It was active until 1963.

== Early Guiding in Sussex ==
Mrs A. Martley established a Guide company in Crawley in 1911. She also established Guiding in Seaford, with two companies opening in December 1918. These were the 1st Seaford and the 1st Blatchington companies. 1st Seaford was initially led by Martley herself, but by 1920 the Captain was Miss Croft. The first Brownie pack in Seaford was established in 1919.

== Enfield District Scout & Guide Band ==
link:http://www.edsb.org.uk

Enfield Scout District runs a traditional marching band which is open to members of the local Scout and Guide organisations. The band was formed in 1976, and is a corps of bugles and drums. The band is a member of the Traditional Youth Marching Band Association, and competes regularly in competitions run by the Association across the UK.

Since its formation, the band has led the District in marches through Enfield Town for the Remembrance Day and St George's Day parades, which form a traditional part of Enfield's Scouting & Guiding calendar. The band took part in the 2002, 2007 and 2008 Lord Mayor's Shows, a royal visit to Enfield by Queen Elizabeth II and Prince Philip, Duke of Edinburgh in 2003.

As part of the 2007 centenary of Scouting, the band took part in the London New Year's Day Parade, and played at the 21st World Scout Jamboree. In November the band formed part of the Promise Centenary Scout Band at the Lord Mayor's Show, and also played at the Scouting's Live '07 show at The O2 in Greenwich, London.
