= Cannon Hill Common =

Park in London, England

Coordinates: 51.401°N 0.220°W

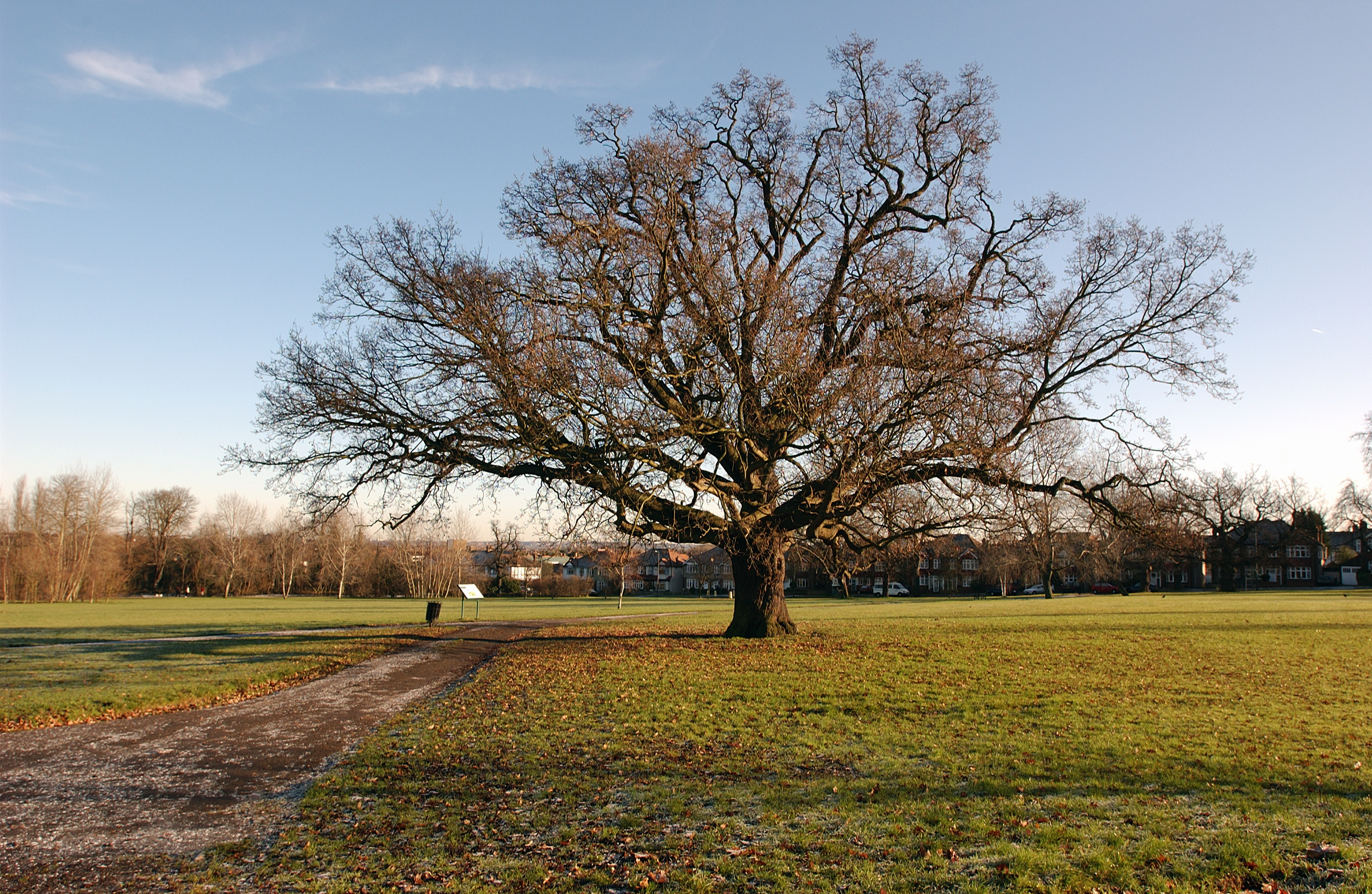
Majestic Oak

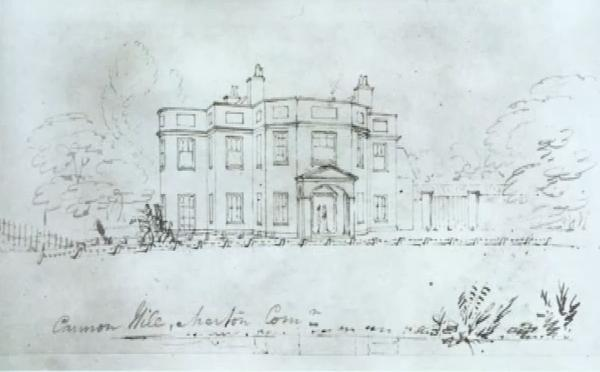
Drawing of Cannon Hill House, 1893.

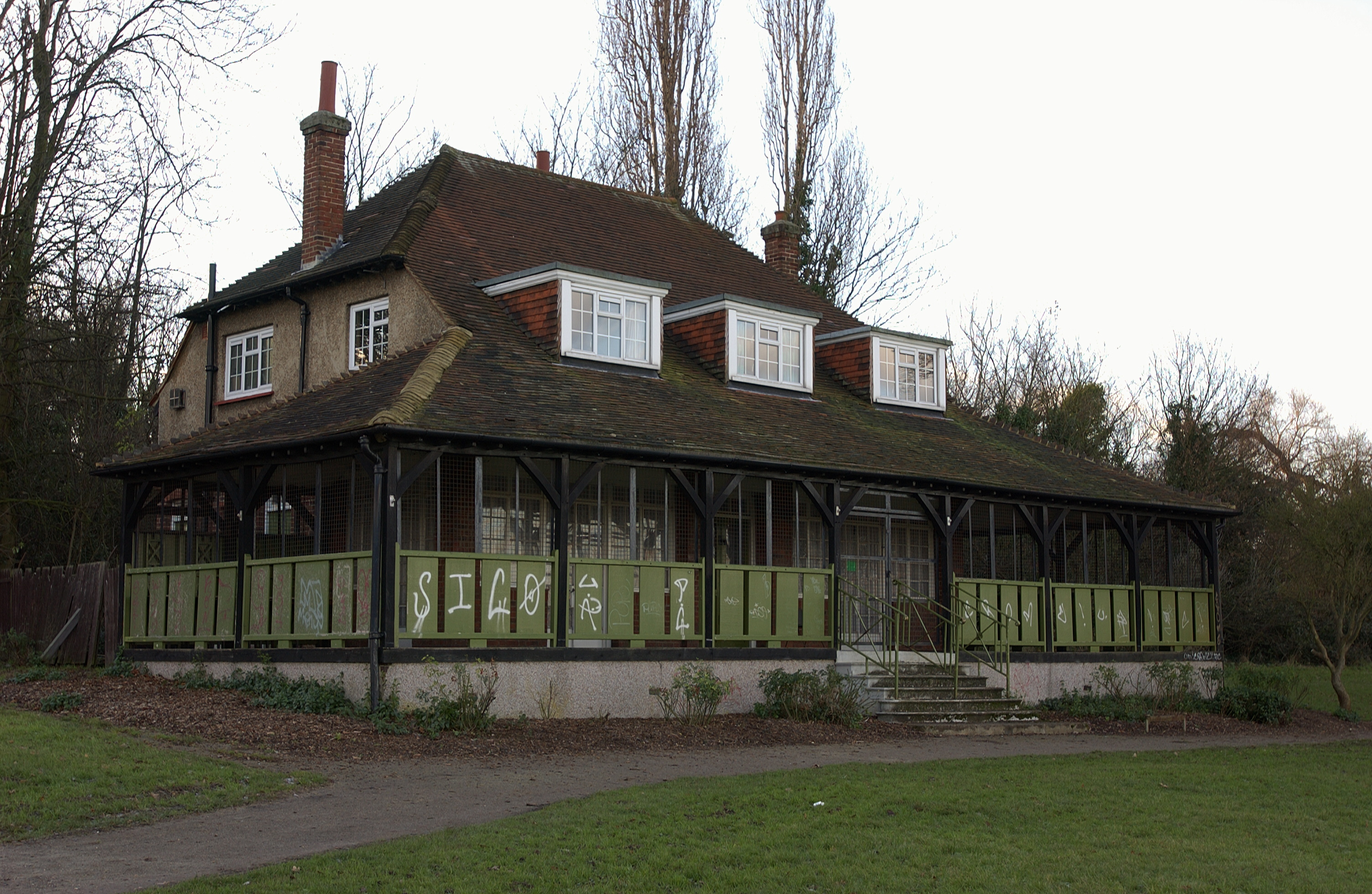
Cafe

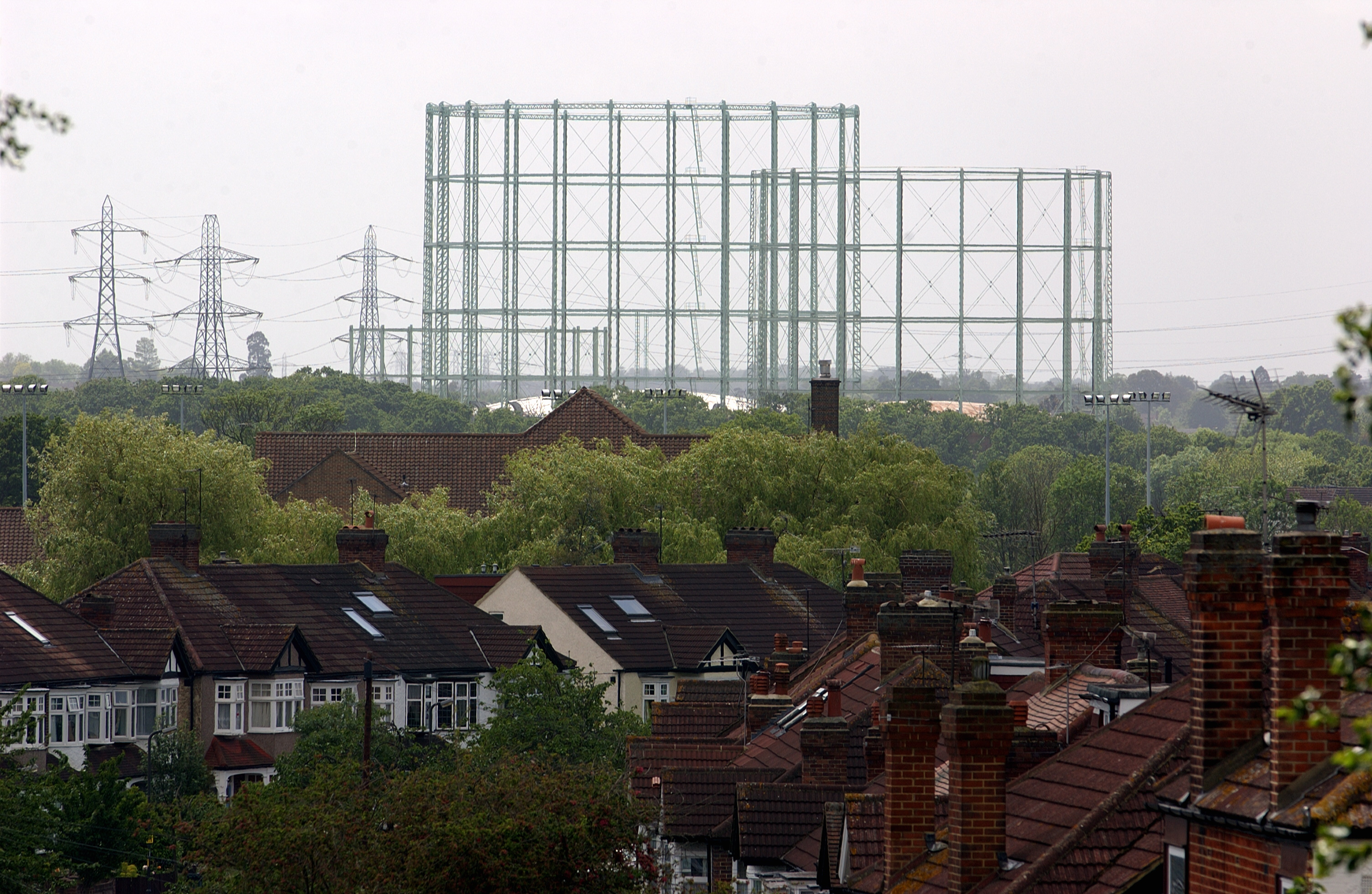
Looking towards Motspur Park

Cannon Hill Common is a public park in the London Borough of Merton. It is situated near Raynes Park and Morden. It is also the location of a Local Nature Reserve and the Paddock Allotments.

== History ==
Cannon Hill Common is not common land. It was but part of the former extensive holdings of Merton Priory, founded in the 12th century and later part of Cannon Hill Estate. The land was farmed for many centuries until Cannon Hill House was built, probably shortly after 1762. The ornamental lake was created in the 18th century and is a remnant of the former landscaped grounds of Cannon Hill House. By 1880 the house was empty and the surrounding land farmed. The house was sited at the top of the common at the edge of the pond and woodland that was first designated a bird sanctuary in 1927.

During its heyday in the nineteenth century a steeple chase of local gentry used to take place from Raynes' farm at West Barnes to Cannon Hill lake and back along what is today Blenheim Road. The Cannon Hill estate was well stocked with pheasants, partridges, hares and rabbits and entertained shooting parties.

Local house builder Mr Blay offered 60 acres (24 ha) of land to Merton and Morden Urban District Council for the creation of Cannon Hill Common. The Council agreed to purchase 53½ acres at a cost of £17,610. The Park officially opened on the 9 April 1927. The pavilion that once stood on the common housed a holiday play scheme in the early seventies and a cafe in the late 1980s. In 2008 the pavilion was destroyed in a fire started by arsonists. The remains were demolished and plans to rebuild it by Merton Council have come to nothing.
