= 1st Buckingham Palace Guide Company =

Girl Guide companies for Princess Elizabeth and Princess Margaret

The 1st Buckingham Palace Guide Company and 1st Buckingham Palace Brownie Pack were established in 1937 for Princess Elizabeth and Princess Margaret. The princesses were the first members of the British royal family to join the Girl Guide movement as children. The intention of their joining the movement was to "allow them social contacts in a wider field."

== Background ==
When Princess Elizabeth turned 11 and was old enough to become a Guide, the Queen Mother, who had been involved with the Girl Guides Association as a district commissioner at Glamis, felt that Guiding "would be a happy and normal activity for a young princess who had to learn so many difficult things." The princess's nanny, Marion Crawford, approached the Girl Guide's headquarters at 25 Buckingham Palace Road, where the chief commissioner for England, Violet Synge, was "appalled at the idea of princesses becoming Guides". However, Synge went to meet the girls at the palace and "found two polite, enthusiastic little girls", which was enough to convince her the idea was practicable after all.

== 1937 Guide Company ==
The 1st Buckingham Palace Company, part of the Westminster Division of the Girl Guides Association, first met in June 1937. Elizabeth was elected seconder of the Kingfisher patrol with Patricia Mountbatten as her patrol leader. The twenty girls making up the company were the children of members of the Royal household and palace employees. Synge became the company's captain. The princesses made their promise to become enrolled Girl Guides, on 13 December 1937. The Company met in Buckingham Palace's school room. They camped at Frogmore House, used Windsor Forest for trekking, bird watching and campfires and the corridors of Buckingham Palace for signalling. Initially, Margaret, who was too young to become a Guide, was allowed to be a Brownie attached to the Guide Company. After some time a Brownie Pack with 14 girls was opened. When Margaret turned 11 she became a Guide. When WWII broke out, the 1st Buckingham Guide Company was temporarily suspended and the princesses moved to Balmoral Castle, where Elizabeth helped to "revitalise" the local Guide Company. The 1st Buckingham Guide Company reopened at Windsor Castle in 1940, renamed as the 1st Windsor Castle Guide Company. Now including London evacuees among its members, it remained at the castle until the end of the war. Margaret joined the Guide Company in April 1942.

When Elizabeth turned 16 she joined the Youth Registration Scheme at the Ministry of Labour. She wore her Guide uniform when she enrolled. By 1945 Margaret was too old to be a Guide and the Company closed.

== 1959 Brownie Pack ==
The 1st Buckingham Palace Brownie Pack was re-formed in the summer of 1959 for Princess Anne. When she turned 11 in 1961, Queen Elizabeth gave permission for the Guide company to be re-formed, which was achieved by amalgamating the 12th Westminster Company with older members of the 1st Buckingham Palace Brownie Pack. The Queen's stated wish was "that the Pack should not be different from other Packs." Anne was patrol leader of the Robin patrol. The captain of the company was Marjorie Bayliss. When Anne had her first official photograph taken on her 13th birthday she wore her Guide uniform. The Company remained active until 1963.

== Members ==
Other members of 1st Buckingham Guide Company included:

- Ela Hilda Aline Beaumont
- Lady Mary Cambridge
- Margaret Elphinstone
- Two daughters of Alec Hardinge, 2nd Baron Hardinge of Penshurst
- Lady Elizabeth Mary Lambart
- Lady Plunket
- Mary Sheepshanks

Other members of 1st Buckingham Brownie Pack included:

- Susan Babbington Smith
- Caroline Hamilton

== Other ==
In 1970, a 75-page Kingfisher patrol logbook, written by Elizabeth, was auctioned in New York. It was believed to be the only handwritten document by Queen Elizabeth II to be ever offered for public sale.

== See also ==
- James, Paul (1990). Margaret: A woman of conflict. London, UK: Sidgwick and Jackson. ISBN 9780283999048.
- Sheepshanks, Mary (2012). Wild writing granny: A memoir. York, UK: Stone Trough Books. ISBN 9780954454272.
