= Agnes Maynard =

British Girl Guide executive (1877–1977)

Agnes Maynard OBE
- Born: Agnes Mary Maynard; 17 May 1877; Islington, London, England
- Died: 2 December 1977 (aged 100); Surrey, England
- Other name: "The Carpenter"
- Occupation: Girl Guide executive

Agnes Mary Maynard OBE (17 May 1877 – 2 December 1977) was a pioneering Girl Guide leader, establishing the 1st Wimbledon Guide Company in 1910. She received the Silver Fish Award, the movement's highest adult honour, twice. Able to turn her hand to most things, Lord Robert Baden-Powell gave her the nickname The Carpenter. She wrote Be Prepared: The official handbook for Guides in 1946.

== Personal life ==
Agnes Mary Maynard was born in Islington, London, to Charles Dudley Maynard and Emily Darell Louise, née McAdam. She had four siblings. She worked as a superintendent of a training home for children in 1908 and, "distressed by the unhappiness of some of the children", started a children's home of her own. In the 1910s and 1920s she lived near Wimbledon Common, from where she ran her Girl Guide activities.

After WWII she lived with fellow Guiders Violet Synge and Dorothy Moore in Bexhill-on-Sea, East Sussex. In 1952 the three moved to Eastbourne, Hampshire, close to the Guide training centre, Foxlease. By 1973 Maynard was living in Haslemere, Surrey where she died, aged 100, at Wilton Nursing Home. In lieu of flowers donations were made to Girl Guide's West Surrey Jubilee Camp Site Fund.

== Girl Guides ==
In 1908, while running her children's home, Maynard read Robert Baden-Powell's recent publication "Scouting for Boys." After learning about the positive impact it had on boys who followed Baden-Powell's programme, she wrote to him asking if it would be possible to have Scouting for girls. He agreed in principle, but was "too busy to help".

Maynard established 1st Wimbledon Guide company in 1910 about which she said, "We started in the same little [Wimbledon] cottage and the whole idea was different… I was their chosen leader because, after all, they didn't have to come into it if they didn't want to. I was wearing the same uniform [as the Scouts]. We had taken the same promise."

In 1916 Maynard was invited by Olave Baden-Powell to attend a conference to discuss the possibilities for creating a Brownie section. The following year, after Agatha Blyth, the founder of the Girl Guide Officers' Training School ("The Goats") was removed from her position by Olave, who gave the role to Maynard.

Maynard was given the nickname "The Carpenter" by Robert Baden-Powell because "she was always doing something, capably, with her hands." Maynard organised the second training school for Scottish Guide leaders in Liberton, Edinburgh in 1919.

In 1921 Maynard travelled to Wisconsin, USA where she ran Girl Scout leader training. She was called "perhaps the greatest scout authority on games". When she left, she was given a Corona typewriter by the captains and leaders she had worked with. She also visited America in 1924, where she ran the first Sea Scout leaders' training school with Helen Storrow, and again in 1925.

She was one of three trainers to run the second and third international training courses for Guiders and Girl Scout leaders at Our Chalet in Adelboden, Switzerland in 1933 and 1934.

Maynard was awarded an OBE for her services to Guiding in 1957. She was made vice-president of the Girl Guide Association in 1960. In 1973, at the age of 96, she was still involved in Guiding and would visit local Guide camps in Haslemere.

=== Positions ===
Maynard held the following positions with the Girl Guide Association:

- Wimbledon division commissioner
- Our Chalet, trainer
- Head of London and SE Guiders' training school, Bryanston Square
- Guide International Council, member
- Queen Mary's Hospital for Children, Carshalton, district commissioner

=== Publications ===
Maynard wrote the following Guiding books, published by the Girl Guides Association:

- An ABC of Guiding (1938)
- Be Prepared: The official handbook for Guides (1946)
- Hiking and lightweight camping (1947)

She also contributed articles to Council Fire, The Guide Scout Leader and The Guider magazines.
