= Wimbledon Chase =

Coordinates: 51°24.6′N 0°12.7′W

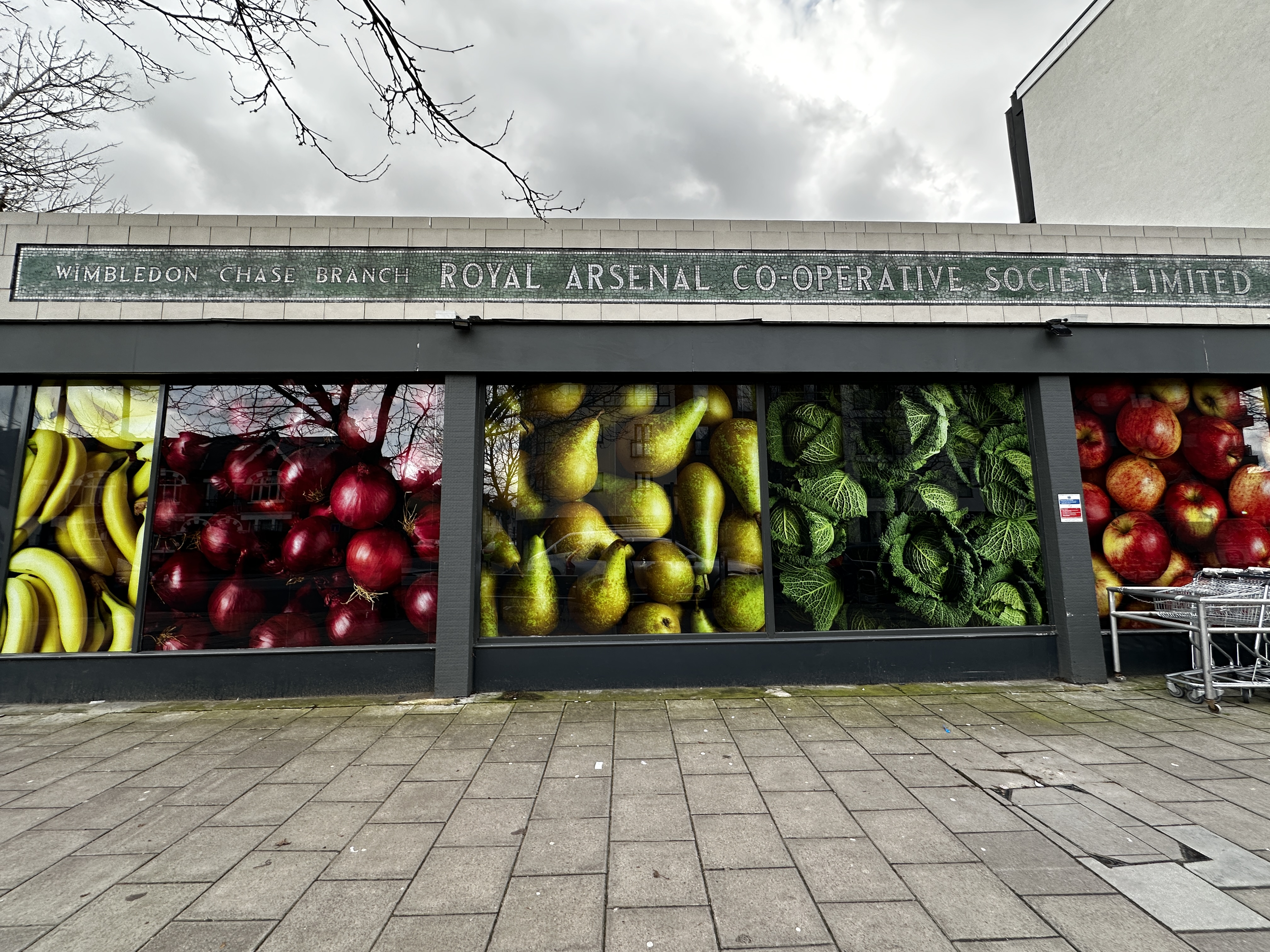
- Former Royal Arsenal Co-operative Society mosaic sign at Wimbledon Chase
- OS grid reference: TQ 24 69
- London borough: Merton
- Ceremonial county: Greater London
- Region: London
- Country: England
- Sovereign state: United Kingdom
- Post town: LONDON
- Postcode district: SW19 & SW20
- Dialling code: 020
- Police: Metropolitan
- Fire: London
- Ambulance: London
- UK Parliament: Wimbledon
- London Assembly: Merton and Wandsworth

Wimbledon Chase is a south-west London suburb part of the wider Wimbledon area. It takes its name from Wimbledon Chase railway station and thus it is an informal definition: parts vie with the definitions of Merton Park, which has a tram link stop to the east of Wimbledon Chase station. Also contemporary suburb names which compete with the definition of this modestly-sized district of Merton to the west and south are Raynes Park and South Merton, respectively.

The area contains Wimbledon Chase Primary School and is largely residential in character, with a small parade of shops on Kingston Road (including a Co-operative Food, a Tesco Express and a BP garage with an M&S concession).

== History ==
See Merton, London (parish)
