= Violet Synge =

English Girl Guide executive (1896–1971)

- Synge from a 1941 newspaper

Girl Guide Chief Commissioner for England

Personal details
- Born: Violet Montressor Synge; 16 May 1896 Hanover Square, Westminster, England
- Died: 13 April 1971 (aged 74) Haslemere, Surrey, England
- Occupation: Girl Guide executive

Violet Montressor Synge (Note: Her name was sometimes misspelt as Singe) (16 May 1896 – 13 April 1971) was an English Girl Guide executive. She held several roles within the Girlguiding movement, including chief commissioner for England and Guider-in-charge of the 1st Buckingham Palace Guide Company, which was set up in 1937 so that Princess Elizabeth and Princess Margaret could join. Synge received the Silver Fish Award, the movement's highest adult honour, for services to world Guiding.

== Personal life ==
Violet Montressor Synge was born in Surrey to an English father, Captain Francis Julian Synge and an American mother, Christobel Etrenne, from Lenox, Massachusetts. She grew up in Chelsea, London and had one surviving brother. During WWI, from 1914 to 1915, Synge worked in a hospital canteen, then drove ambulances until 1919. She was presented at court in June 1920.

By 1939 Synge was living in Rickmansworth and working for the British Red Cross. During WWII, she was a Commandant-Major in the Mechanised Transport Corps (MTC). Early in the formation of the Girls Training Corps she was made a commandant of 1st (Chelsea) Company. Established by MTC, the Corps was for females aged 14 to 20 who planned to eventually join the Women's Royal Naval Service, Auxiliary Territorial Service, Women's Auxiliary Air Force, munitions work or nursing.

After the war Synge lived in Chantry Cottage, Bexhill-on-Sea with fellow Guiders Agnes Maynard and Dorothy Moore until 1952, when the three women moved to Eastbourne, Hampshire. By 1957 she was living in Tilford, Surrey. Synge died at Holy Cross Hospital, Haslemere. She left her body for medical research.

== Girl Guides ==
Synge joined the Girl Guide movement in the late 1920s. Her Guiding qualifications included the Chief's diploma for training. Because of "her record, her ideas and her initiative" Synge was selected to establish the 1st Buckingham Palace Guide Company, so that Princess Elizabeth and Princess Margaret could experience "social contacts in a wider field." Before setting up the Company she had been Guider-in-charge of a Guide company in Westminster. Of the princesses, Synge said both "were keen to learn anything, and never shirked the common tasks of potato peeling." She retired from the position in 1945.

Between 1945 and 1950 Synge was Imperial commissioner for Guides. From 1947 to 1952 she was division commissioner for Bexhill-on-Sea. In July 1947 Synge led 1,850 Guides and Scouts in a march at The Mall, overseen by Princess Elizabeth in her first official duty after announcing her engagement to Philip Mountbatten. That November she attended the royal couple's wedding. By 1948 Synge was commissioner of Guides for the Girl Guides Association. She attended the 1948 WAGGGS World Conference at Cooperstown, New York. In 1950 she commanded a parade of 8,000 Rangers, inspected by Princess Margaret, at White City, London.

In 1951 Synge was a member of the World Guide committee. At the 1952 WAGGGS World Conference in Dombås, Norway she was appointed world advisor for Guide training. In the same year, she received the Silver Fish Award for her services to the Girlguiding movement.

The Violet Synge Memorial Fund was set up after her death, the moneys from which were used to buy equipment for Girl Guide campsite, Blackland Farm in East Grinstead.

== Publications ==
- Hints on Girl Guide Tests: Tenderfoot, Second Class, First Class and Able Sea Guide (1939) Pub. Brown, Son and Ferguson Ltd - contributor
- Royal Guides: A story of the 1st Buckingham Palace Company (1948) Pub. Girl Guides Association - author
- Synge translated the song O Vremeli, my pretty one, as published by Janet E. Tobitt.
