= Copse Hill =

Coordinates: 51.418225°N 0.233234°W

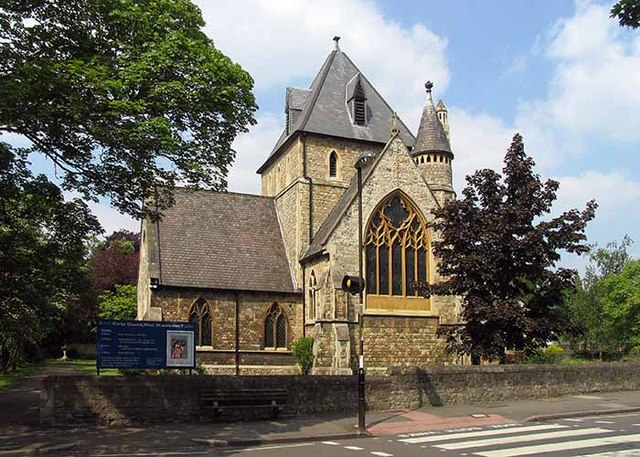
- Christ Church, Copse Hill, West Wimbledon

- Location within Greater London
- London borough: Merton
- Ceremonial county: Greater London
- Region: London
- Country: England
- Sovereign state: United Kingdom
- Post town: LONDON
- Postcode district: SW20
- Dialling code: 020
- Police: Metropolitan
- Fire: London
- Ambulance: London
- UK Parliament: Wimbledon
- London Assembly: Merton and Wandsworth

Copse Hill is a low-rise district of the London Borough of Merton to the south of Wimbledon Common, associated with Raynes Park its nearest railway station. It is on higher ground and has the largest green spaces associated with the Raynes Park/West Wimbledon area surrounding it. It was almost entirely privately developed; the nearest social housing areas are in Wimbledon, and Putney Vale.

As of 2019, a little of its undeveloped land is being built upon, in projects begun in about the year 2017 mainly in its Wimbledon Hill Park development, estate or neighbourhood by Berkeley Homes.
