= Windsor Forest and Great Park =

Protected area in Berkshire and Surrey, England

Coordinates: 51.444°N 0.632°W

- Site of Special Scientific Interest
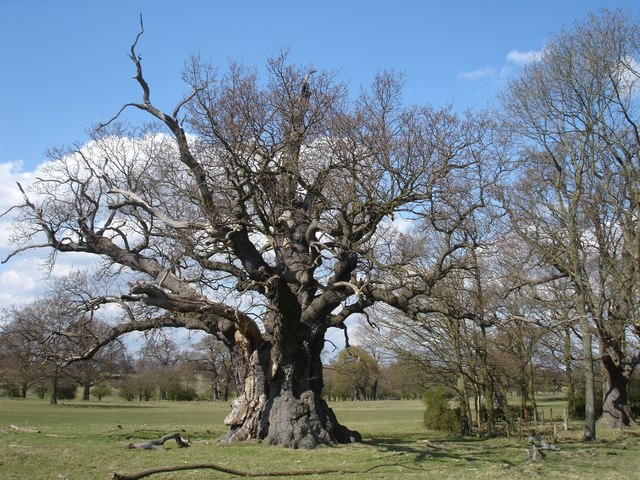
- Location of Windsor Forest and Great Park.
- Area of search: Berkshire; Surrey
- Grid reference: SU 952 725
- Interest: Biological
- Area: 1,778.9 hectares (4,396 acres)
- Notification date: 2000
- Location map: Magic Map

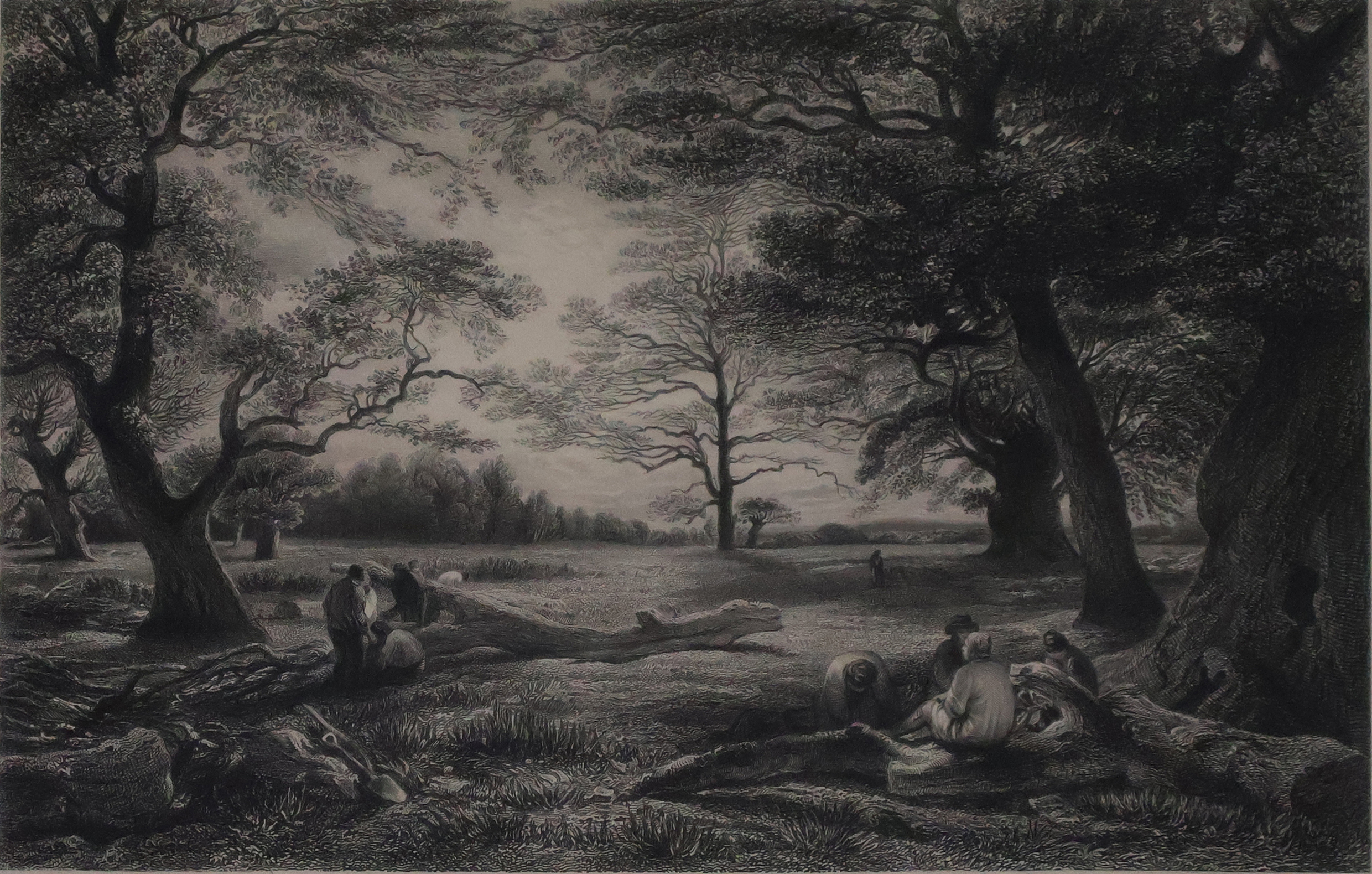
An engraving c1851, of woodcutters in Windsor Forest. The painter after whose work this was engraved was John Linnell (1792-1882). The engraver is Thomas Abiel Prior(1809–1886).

Windsor Forest and Great Park is a 1,778.9-hectare (4,396-acre) biological Site of Special Scientific Interest in Berkshire and Surrey, located south of Windsor. It is a Special Area of Conservation and Windsor Forest is a Nature Conservation Review site, Grade I. Landscaped woodland gardens are Grade I listed on the Register of Historic Parks and Gardens of Special Historic Interest. Windsor Great Park is a Royal Park of 2,020 hectares (5,000 acres), including a deer park,

This large site has woodland with many ancient trees and large areas of parkland. It is second only to the New Forest for the diversity of its invertebrates, including many Red Data Book beetles and flies. There is an internationally important population of the violet click beetle. The fungi species are very diverse, including some which are extremely rare.
