= Hall School Wimbledon =

School in Wimbledon, London

- 17 The Downs Wimbledon London SW20 8HF

Information
- Type: Private day school
- Established: 1991
- Department for Education URN: 101086 Tables
- Head of school: Mr Jack Tyson
- Gender: Mixed
- Age range: 8-18 years
- Enrollment: 227
- Colors: Green and Navy Blue
- Information: School Pillars: Learning Together, Leading Together. Intentionally Small Classes, Big Impact. Boundless Opportunity to Stretch and Shine Values: Belonging, Kindness, Collaboration, Ambition, Curiosity
- Website: https://hsw.co.uk/

Hall School Wimbledon (HSW) is a co-educational non-selective independent (private) day school in Wimbledon, London. The school was founded in 1991, by former Headmaster Timothy Hobbs, with only nine pupils. It is registered to accept students between the ages of 4 and 18, however it currently only has pupils between the ages of 8 and 18 (Year 4 – Upper Sixth).

In September 2018 Hall school Wimbledon was acquired by Chatsworth Schools. The current Headmaster is Jack Tyson.

The Junior School, which was located in Putney Vale (SW15), has now moved to 17 The Downs in Wimbledon (SW20) where the Senior School is located.

== Admissions process ==
Hall School Wimbledon admits pupils of a range of academic abilities, provided that they are judged capable of prospering within the school curriculum (mainstream academic). All prospective parents are encouraged to visit the school prior to registering. Children are not assessed for entry but applicants are interviewed by the Headmaster.

== Notable former pupils ==
- Alex Corbisiero, Rugby Union forward for London Irish, Northampton Saints and England
- Jamie Treays, Musician
