= Jerry Abershawe =

English highwayman (c.1773–1795)

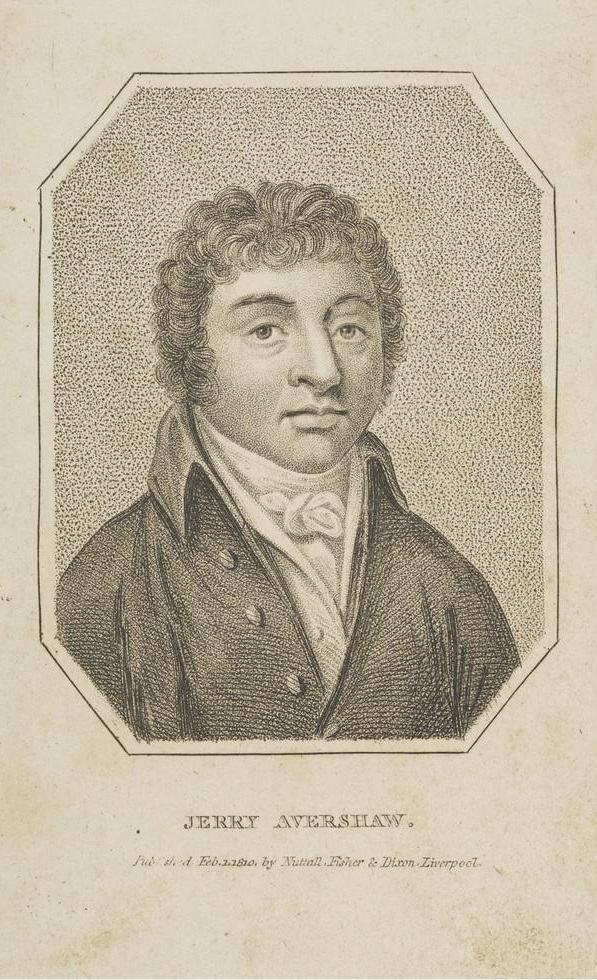
- Born: Louis Jeremiah Abershawe c. 1773; Kingston-upon-Thames, England
- Died: 3 August 1795 (aged 21–22); Kennington Common, Borough of Lambeth, England
- Occupations: Highwayman, murderer
- Known for: The last hanged highwayman to have his body put on public display after execution in England.

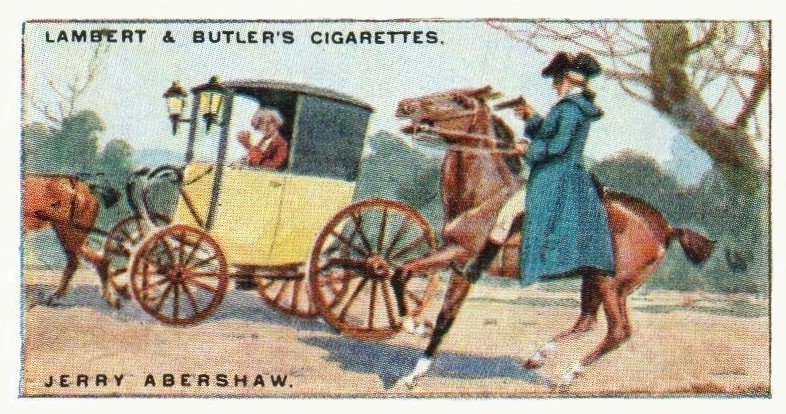
Cigarette card issued in 1926

Louis Jeremiah Abershawe (c. 1773 – 3 August 1795), better known as Jerry Abershawe, or Abershaw, was an English highwayman who terrorised travellers, mostly along the road between Kingston upon Thames and London, in the late eighteenth century.

== Biography ==
Born in Kingston upon Thames, Surrey, Abershawe started his life of crime at the age of seventeen, leading a gang of robbers based at the Bald-Faced Stag Inn at Putney Vale, on the road between Kingston and London. When in hiding he frequented a house in Clerkenwell, near Saffron Hill, known as the "Old House in West Street", which was noted for its dark closets, trap-doors and sliding panels, and had often formed the asylum of wanted criminals, including Jonathan Wild and Jack Sheppard.

All efforts to bring Abershawe to justice for a time proved futile, but in January 1795 he shot dead one of the constables sent to arrest him in Southwark, and attempted to shoot another. He was eventually arrested in London at a public house, The Three Brewers, in Southwark. For his crimes he was brought to trial at the Surrey assizes in July of the same year. Although a legal flaw in the indictment invalidated the case of murder against him, he was convicted and sentenced to death on the second charge of felonious shooting.

On Monday, 3 August 1795, Abershawe was hanged on Kennington Common; his body was afterwards set on a gallows (gibbeted) at Putney Vale — the last hanged highwayman's body to be so displayed.

The coolness with which Abershawe met his death prolonged his notoriety, and his name was commonly used as a synonym for a daring thief in the early years of the nineteenth century. He received his sentence with extraordinary sangfroid, putting on his own hat at the same moment as the judge assumed the black cap, and "observing him with contemptuous looks" while pronouncing judgment. The few days that intervened between his conviction and execution he spent in sketching with cherries on the walls of his cell scenes from his daring exploits on the road. While being driven to the gallows he "appeared entirely unconcerned, had a flower in his mouth... and he kept up an incessant conversation with the persons who rode beside the cart, frequently laughing and nodding to others of his acquaintances whom he perceived in the crowd, which was immense", according to an article in the Oracle and Public Advertiser. In a pamphlet on his career, entitled Hardened Villany Displayed, which was published soon after his death, he is described as "a good-looking young man, only 22 years of age".

Abershawe was sometimes known as "The Laughing Highwayman" (ref: "Weird Croydon"):

"Although Abershawe was far removed from the romantic image of the lovable rogue, he possessed a healthy sense of humour, often incorporating his ironic wit into his robberies. An extract from the history book Local Highwaymen reads: 'Abershaw's humour seemed to be at its best when his personal fortunes were at their worst, for instance, at the time of his trial and eventual hanging a classic example of gallows humour.'

Anecdotes of Abershawe credit him with the rude generosity commonly ascribed to men of his vocation. On one November night, it is said, after several hours spent upon the road, he was taken ill at the Bald-Faced Stag, and a doctor was sent for from Kingston. Abershawe entreated the doctor, who was in ignorance of his patient's name, to travel back under the protection of one of his own men, but the gentleman refused, declaring that he feared no one, even should he meet with Abershawe himself. The story was frequently repeated by the highwayman, as a testimony to the eminence he had gained in his profession.

== In popular culture ==
- Abershawe appears in The Romany Rye by George Borrow, alongside others such as "Galloping Dick" Ferguson.
- In the novel Jacob Faithful by Frederick Marryat, Jacob and another boy get lost on Wimbledon Common and see the hanging skeleton of Jerry Abershawe. He is a character (as Jerry Abershaw) in "The Red House" in Six Ghost Stories by Sir Thomas Graham Jackson.
- Abershaw is referred to in Georgette Heyer's Regency Buck: “and all the while they could hear Jerry Abershaw, who was hanging there in chains, creaking every time the wind caught him”.
