= Raynes Park =

Area of south London, in the borough of Merton

Coordinates: 51.4033°N 0.2321°W

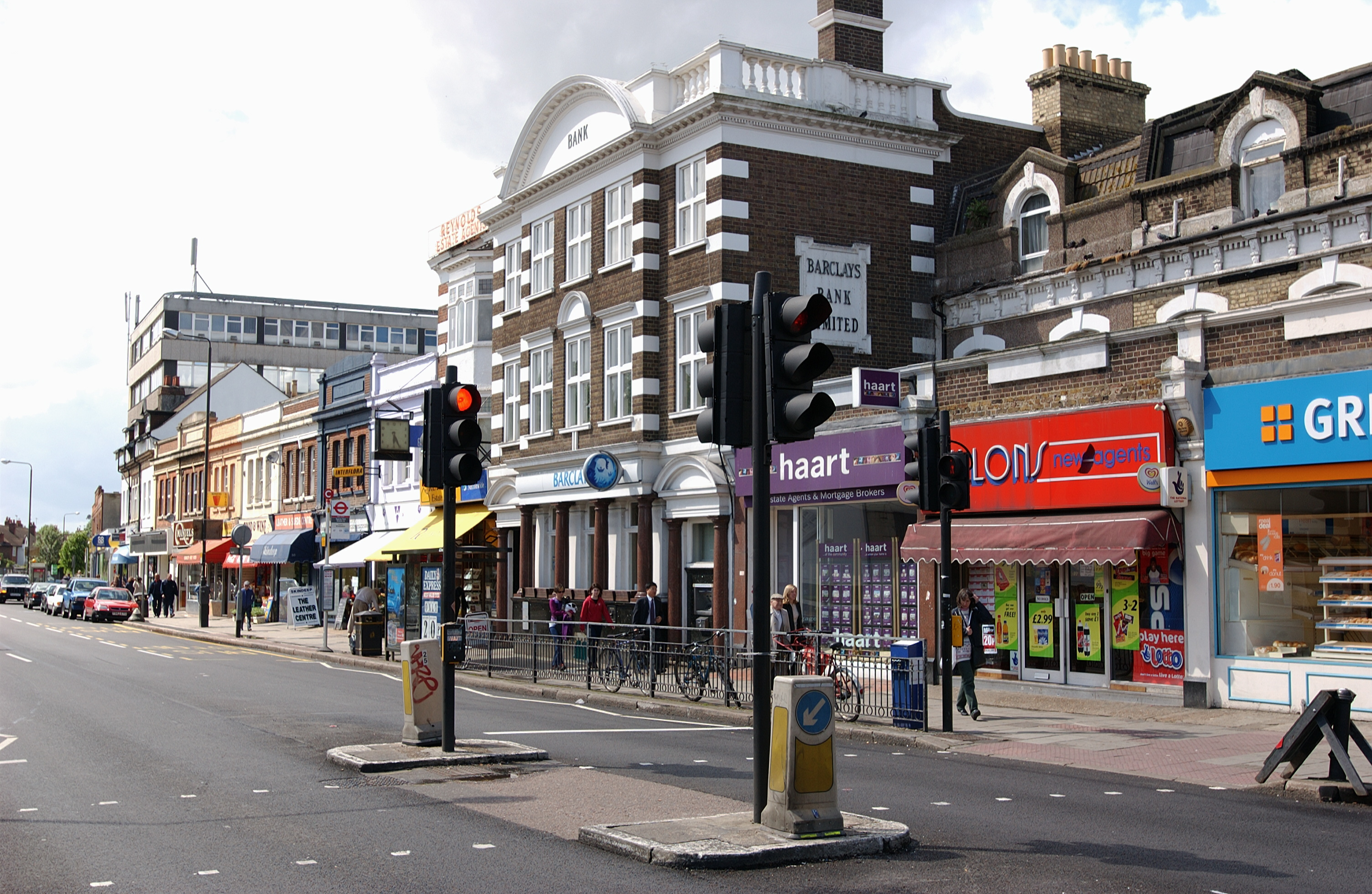
- Coombe Lane

- Location within Greater London
- Population: 9,738 (2011 Census. Ward)
- OS grid reference: TQ235685
- London borough: Merton
- Ceremonial county: Greater London
- Region: London
- Country: England
- Sovereign state: United Kingdom
- Post town: LONDON
- Postcode district: SW20
- Post town: NEW MALDEN
- Postcode district: KT3
- Dialling code: 020
- Police: Metropolitan
- Fire: London
- Ambulance: London
- UK Parliament: Wimbledon
- London Assembly: Merton and Wandsworth

Raynes Park is a residential suburb, railway station and local centre near Wimbledon, London, and is within the London Borough of Merton. It is situated southwest of Wimbledon Common, to the northwest of Wimbledon Chase and to the east of New Malden, in South West London. It is 7.8 miles (12.5 km) southwest of Charing Cross. Towards the north and west, either side of the borough boundary with the Royal Borough of Kingston upon Thames are the areas of Copse Hill and Coombe with their large detached houses, golf courses and gated lands. Raynes Park had a population of 19,619 in 2011, which refers to the populations of the wards of Raynes Park and West Barnes. The district of Raynes Park is composed of the neighbourhoods Motspur Park (West Barnes), Raynes Park itself, Shannon Corner and Grand Drive.

Nearby settlements include New Malden, Kingston, South Wimbledon, Colliers Wood, Worcester Park, Morden and Lower Morden.

== Governance ==
Raynes Park is part of the Wimbledon constituency for elections to the House of Commons of the United Kingdom.

Raynes Park is part of the Raynes Park ward for elections to Merton London Borough Council.

== Geography ==
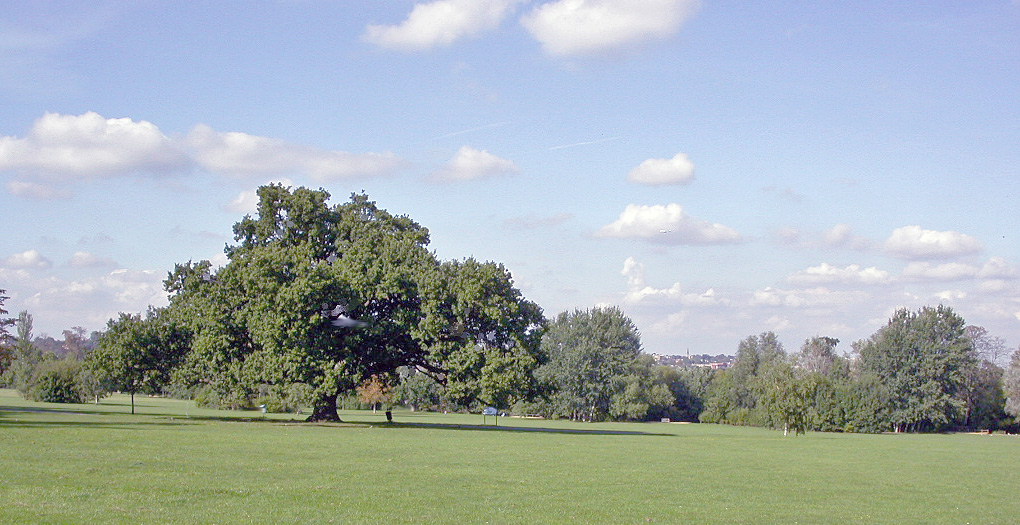
Across Cannon Hill Common to Wimbledon.

Raynes Park is 7.8 miles from Central London and has one of the largest proportions of green open space in South London. The area has a number of parks including Cottenham Park Recreation Ground, named after Charles Pepys, 1st Earl of Cottenham, and Cannon Hill Common. It lies approximately 2.5 miles (4 km) north of the Greater London border with Surrey.

Cannon Hill Common covers 21 hectares of open space, and is a site of borough importance – Grade 1 for Nature Conservation. It contains mature woodland that is over 140 years old and provides a habitat for a variety of fauna and flora.

== History ==
Historically, the area of Raynes Park south of Coombe Lane and Kingston Road was part of the parish of Merton and the area north of that line was part of the Parish of Wimbledon. The area remained rural until late into the 19th century. The first development in the area was the opening of the London & South Western Railway in May 1838 which crossed the area on a high embankment, although the station did not open until 1871.

Cottenham Park to the north of the station was the first part of the area to be laid out for development in the 1870s. It takes its name from Charles Pepys, 1st Earl of Cottenham who lived in Wimbledon until his death in 1851. The name Raynes Park was originally used in the 1870s and only applied to the area south of the railway line where the local landowner, Richard Garth, Lord of the manor of the adjacent parish of Morden, planned to develop a new garden suburb similar to that being developed by John Innes at Merton Park to the east. The name refers to the Rayne family, the previous landowners of the farmland on which Garth intended to build.

Garth laid out the northern section of Grand Drive, about as far south as Heath Drive, and Blenheim Road and persuaded the railway company to build the station. A number of detached houses were constructed, but Garth's absence as Chief Justice of Bengal slowed the development and much of the rest of the area became a golf course and cricket grounds.

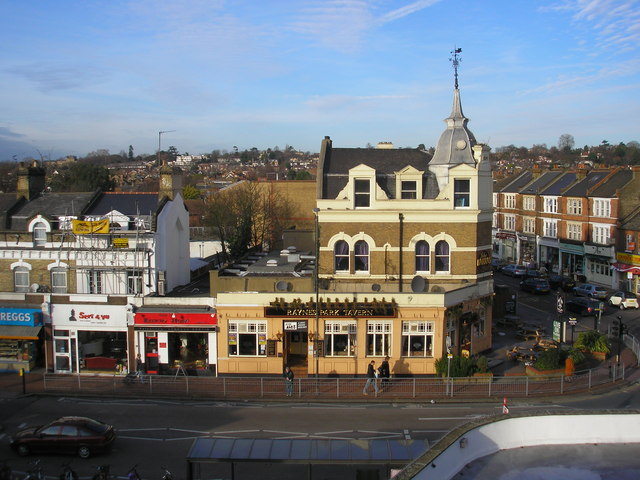
The Raynes Park Tavern from the high footbridge at the station

By the late Victorian period the residential development of Wimbledon was encroaching on the north side of the railway from the east but, apart from a few buildings including the Junction Tavern and a school, development around the station did not start until the beginning of the 20th century.

South of the railway, the twelve terraced roads known locally as "the Apostles" (although they are not named after the Apostles) were laid out over a former cricket ground starting during the Victorian period. In the 1920s, the Kingston Bypass (A3) and its spur, Bushey Road (A298), were built as dual carriageways. South of the railway, the majority of residential development occurred in the 1930s with Grand Drive being extended south into Lower Morden and new roads being developed. During the interwar period, developer George Blay was key in transforming Raynes Park into the place it is today, with his properties still known locally as "Blay houses". Much of the area remains open space.

During World War II the area suffered considerable bombing, especially in 1944 from the V-1 flying bomb.

In 2015, Raynes Park High Street was a finalist in the Great British High Street competition's London category. The competition title was eventually won by Ealing's Pitshanger Lane.

== Transport and amenities ==
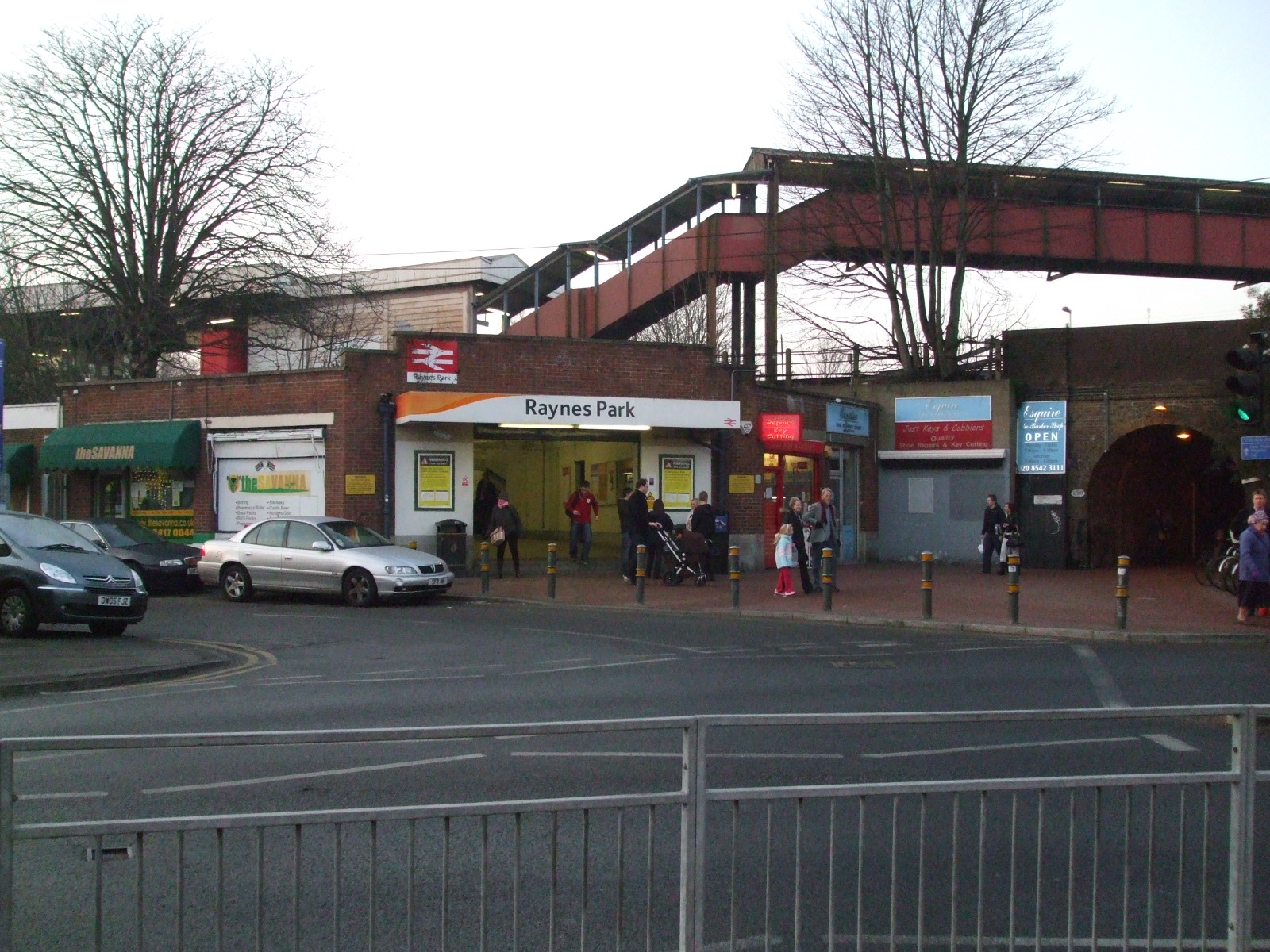
Raynes Park station, south entrance

Raynes Park station is on the National Rail network. The station is at the junction of the branch line heading towards Epsom and Dorking and has four platforms. A distinctive local landmark is the station footbridge which spans all four main running lines at an angle of about 45 degrees. Another distinctive feature of the station is that the platforms are not opposite each other. The station benefits from frequent train services to central London, with approximately 210 trains to Waterloo each day, averaging about 12 per hour during service hours. Raynes Park is effectively divided into two by the Waterloo - Southampton mainline railway.

In recent years, Raynes Park has benefitted from increased investments; this includes a large Waitrose.

Raynes Park has London bus services running through Wimbledon to Colliers Wood, Tooting, Streatham and to New Malden and Kingston upon Thames, as well as nightbus services to Wandsworth, Vauxhall, Westminster and Aldwych.

Bushey Road connects the Kingston Bypass to Wimbledon Chase and Merton Park. On the south side is Prince George's playing field which plays host to Sunday league football. The field also has other purposes and has in the past held travelling Funfairs and Hindu festival celebrations. Adjacent to the playing field is a sports and leisure centre. The area has a number of other parks and open spaces including Cottenham Park Recreation Ground and Raynes Park Sports Ground.

The nearest London Underground tube station is Wimbledon on the District line.

Table of public transport services in Raynes Park
Route number	Start	End	Operator	Frequency	Transport Type	Oyster Zone	Other Info
N/A	London Waterloo	Dorking	South Western Railway	30 mins	Heavy Rail/Railway	4	
N/A	London Waterloo	Epsom	South Western Railway	Rush Hour Only	Heavy Rail/Railway	4	
N/A	London Waterloo	Guildford	South Western Railway	30 mins via both Epsom and Surbiton	Heavy Rail/Railway	4	
N/A	London Waterloo	Richmond	South Western Railway	30 mins	Heavy Rail/Railway	4	
N/A	London Waterloo	Hampton Court	South Western Railway	30 mins	Heavy Rail/Railway	4	
N/A	London Waterloo	Shepperton	South Western Railway	30 mins	Heavy Rail/Railway	4	
N/A	London Waterloo	Chessington South	South Western Railway	30 mins	Heavy Rail/Railway	4	
57	Kingston	Clapham Park	Go-Ahead London/London General	10 mins 24/7	Bus	N/A	Via Kingston Hospital
131	Kingston	Tooting Broadway	Go-Ahead London/London General	8-12 mins Joint night bus service with route N87.	Bus	N/A	Via New Malden
N87	Kingston	Aldwych	Go-Ahead London/London General	20 mins	Bus	N/A	Via New Malden
152	Pollards Hill	New Malden	Go-Ahead London/London General	10 mins	Bus	N/A	
163	Wimbledon	Morden	Go-Ahead London/London General	10 mins	Bus	N/A	Via Lower Morden
K5	Morden	Ham	Quality Line/RATP Group	30 mins with no Sunday or Public Holidays service	Bus	N/A	Via Circle Gardens and Wimbledon Chase
655	Mitcham	Raynes Park High School	Go-Ahead London/London General	School Bus Service	Bus	N/A	
200	Mitcham	Raynes Park	Go-Ahead London/London General	10 mins	Bus	N/A	

== Sport and leisure ==
Raynes Park has a Non-League football club Raynes Park Vale F.C. who play at Prince George's Fields. Other leisure facilities in the area include the Raynes Park Residents Lawn Tennis Club, and the Malden Golf Club. The Malden Golf Club was founded in 1893 and the parkland course is set over an area of 120 acres. Wimbledon United CC have fielded a number of Sunday cricket teams with great success at their home ground at Cottenham Park for the past 90 years. Cannon Hill Common is popular for walking, cycling, recreational fishing and angling, dog walking, bird watching and represents a small piece of countryside within the city of London. Wimbledon Volleyball Club is based at Raynes Park High School.

From 2010 to 2022 the MyRaynesPark Festival took place annually for a week during the summer, providing arts and cultural events for the local community, with previous guest speakers including Yasmin Alibhai-Brown and Tim Vine.

In 2025, Raynes Park hosted its first Free Film Festival. This included feature films, as well as short films by local filmmakers including Keif Gwinn, Carmela Corbett, and Mark Lever.

== Notable residents ==
- Oliver Reed, actor
- Richard Briers, actor
- Mike Lindup, Level 42 keyboard player & vocalist
- Ted Drake, Arsenal & England footballer, Chelsea manager lived in Devas Road
- Danny Cipriani, England rugby player
- Chris Powell, footballer
- Martin Brett (Brett Martini), musician, Voice of the Beehive
- Graham Stuart, footballer
- Dave Benson-Phillips, children's television presenter, who lived in Cannon Hill Lane
- Mavis Cheek, novelist, as a child
- Tubby Hayes, jazz musician
- Jay Laga'aia, actor
- Max Clifford, former publicist
- Bella Emberg, actor and comedian
- Ed Gamble, comedian and podcaster
- Hayley Mills, actor lived on Cambridge Road
- Dane Vilas, South African cricketer and coach.
