= All clear =

Air raid siren signal

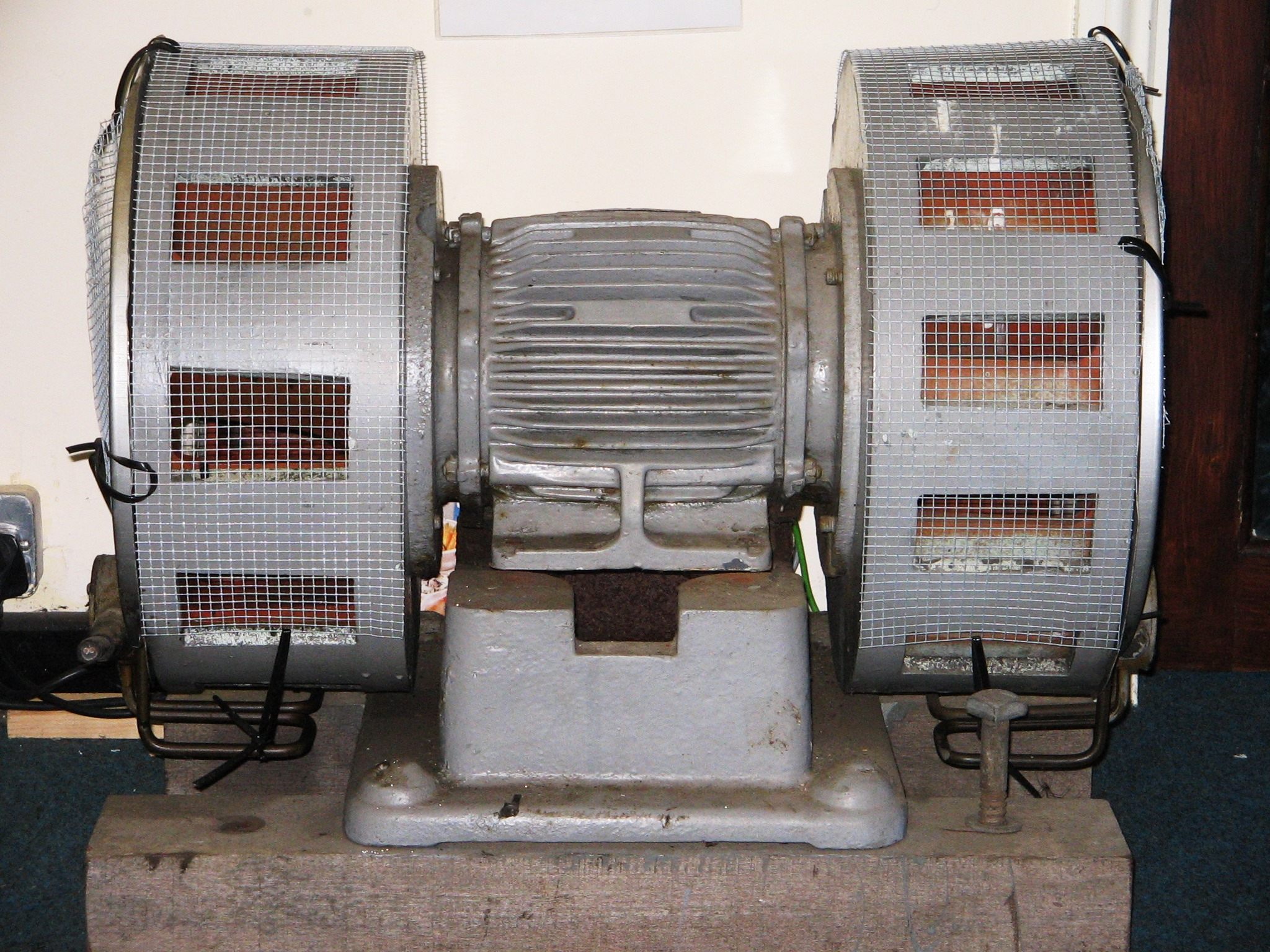
A British air raid siren from the Second World War.

All clear is the signal, generally given by an air raid siren, which indicates that an air raid or other hazard has finished and that it is safe for civilians to leave their shelters; it is commonly used in radios as well.

== United Kingdom ==
During the First World War, the Metropolitan Police introduced their first air raid warning system in London in 1917, which consisted of police officers detonating maroons (a type of loud firework) and the "all clear" was sounded by Boy Scout buglers.

Immediately before the Second World War, a network of sirens had been established in towns across the United Kingdom; the "alert" was given by a rising and falling tone and the "all clear" by a continuous tone. The sirens remained in place during the Cold War but instead of being the responsibility of local police forces, the alarms were activated by the United Kingdom Warning and Monitoring Organisation. Following an air raid, the "all clear" would only be sounded if no nuclear weapons had been used, or when any nuclear fallout was deemed by the Royal Observer Corps to have reached safe levels, which might have been up to two weeks later. The system was discontinued in 1992.

== Other countries ==
Long audio clip of a Swedish warning signal. A seven-second tone followed by a 14 second pause, then a new tone, a new break and so on for two minutes. After a long pause there is (beginning at 4m43s) a 30 second "all clear" signal.

The following is a list of some countries that use an "all clear" on sirens:

- Denmark
- Sweden
- Singapore
- Bahrain
- Saudi Arabia
- Qatar
- United Arab Emirates
- United States (some areas)
- Afghanistan (for instance, Kandahar)
- Canada
- Israel

Countries that do not use an "all clear" include:

- Netherlands
- South Korea
- China
- Kuwait
- United States (some areas)
