= Counties 3 Surrey =

Level 11 English Rugby Union League

- Sport: Rugby union
- Instituted: 1987; 39 years ago
- Number of teams: 10
- Country: England
- Holders: Old Caterhamians
- Most titles: Bec Old Boys, Worth Old Boys, Old Caterhamians (3 titles)
- Website: englandrugby.com

Counties 3 Surrey is a rugby union competition covering the English county of Surrey and parts of south-west London. It sits at the ninth tier of the English rugby union system. The teams play home and away matches from September through to April. Promoted teams move up to Counties 2 Surrey and relegated teams move down to Counties 4 Surrey.

Each year some of the clubs in this division also take part in the RFU Junior Vase - a level 9-11 national competition.

== Teams for 2026–27 ==
Leaving the league were champions Thamesians and runners-up Effingham & Leatherhead, both promoted to Counties 2 Surrey whilst Old Glynonians (11th) were relegated to Counties 4 Surrey.

Team	Ground	Capacity	City/Area	Previous season
Cranleigh	Wildwood Lane		Cranleigh, Surrey	Promoted from Counties 4 Surrey (runners-up)
Haslemere	Woolmer Hill Sports Association		Haslemere, Surrey	9th
Kingston	Hook Road		Chessington, London	7th
Law Society	King's College Sportsground		New Malden, London	8th
London Exiles	Barn Elms		Barnes, London	5th
London Media	Battersea Park		Battersea, London	Promoted from Counties 4 Surrey (3rd)
Old Cranleighan	Old Cranleighan Sports Club		Thames Ditton, Surrey	Relegated from Counties 2 Surrey (12th)
Old Emanuel	Raynes Park Sports Ground		Raynes Park, London	Promoted from Counties 4 Surrey (champions)
Old Georgians	St George's College		Addlestone, Surrey	3rd
Old Johnians	St John's School		Leatherhead, Surrey	6th
Southwark Lancers	Burgess Park		Camberwell, London	4th
Streatham-Croydon	Frant Road	2,000 (200 seats)	Thornton Heath, London	10th

Locations of the 2026–27 Counties 3 Surrey teams in Greater London
Locations of the 2026–27 Counties 3 Surrey teams in Surrey

== Teams for 2025–26 ==
Leaving the league were Worth Old Boys and Old Hamptonians, promoted to Counties 2 Surrey whilst London Media (10th) and Warlingham (11th) were relegated to Counties 4 Surrey. Economicals (9th) elected to be re-allocated to Counties 5 Surrey ahead of the new season.

Team	Ground	Capacity	City/Area	Previous season
Effingham & Leatherhead	King George V Playing Fields		Effingham, Surrey	4th
Haslemere	Woolmer Hill Sports Association		Haslemere, Surrey	Promoted from Counties 4 Surrey (champions)
Kingston	Hook Road		Chessington, London	Relegated from Counties 2 Surrey (10th)
Law Society	King's College Sportsground		New Malden, London	5th
London Exiles	Barn Elms		Barnes, London	7th
Old Georgians	St George's College		Addlestone, Surrey	3rd
Old Glynonians	Glyn School		Epsom, Surrey	Promoted from Counties 4 Surrey (runners-up)
Old Johnians	St John's School		Leatherhead, Surrey	6th
Southwark Lancers	Burgess Park		Camberwell, London	Promoted from Counties 4 Surrey (3rd)
Streatham-Croydon	Frant Road	2,000 (200 seats)	Thornton Heath, London	8th
Thamesians	Twickenham Green		Twickenham, London	Level transfer from Counties 3 Herts/Middlesex (runners-up)

Locations of the 2025-26 Counties 3 Surrey teams in Greater London
Locations of the 2025-26 Counties 3 Surrey teams in Surrey

== Teams for 2024–25 ==
Leaving the league were Bec Old Boys and Met Police, promoted to Counties 2 Surrey whilst Old Emanuel were relegated to Counties 4 Surrey. In their place came Law Society and Warlingham, relegated from Counties 2 Surrey whilst Streatham-Croydon and Old Hamptonians were promoted from Counties 4 Surrey.

Ordinarily having finished 9th London Media would have been relegated too but owing to Old Freemans suffering a double relegation from Counties 2 Surrey to Counties 4 Surrey they earned a reprieve. Consequently the league will run with eleven sides.

Team	Ground	Capacity	City/Area	Previous season
Economicals	LSE Sports Ground		New Malden, London	6th
Effingham & Leatherhead	King George V Playing Fields		Effingham, Surrey	8th
Law Society	King's College Sportsground		New Malden, London	Relegated from Counties 2 Surrey (10th)
London Exiles	Barn Elms		Barnes, London	7th
London Media	Battersea Park		Battersea, London	9th
Old Georgians	St George's College		Addlestone, Surrey	3rd
Old Hamptonians	Dean Road		Hampton, London	Promoted from Counties 4 Surrey (champions)
Old Johnians	St John's School		Leatherhead, Surrey	5th
Streatham-Croydon	Frant Road	2,000 (200 seats)	Thornton Heath, London	Promoted from Counties 4 Surrey (runners-up)
Warlingham	Limpsfield Road		Warlingham, Surrey	Relegated from Counties 2 Surrey (11th)
Worth Old Boys	North Avenue		Whiteley Village, Surrey	4th

Locations of the 2024-25 Counties 3 Surrey teams in Greater London
Locations of the 2024-25 Counties 3 Surrey teams in Surrey

== Teams for 2023-24 ==
Departing the league were Old Caterhamians and Old Wimbledonians, promoted to Counties 2 Surrey whilst Cranleigh were relegated to Counties 4 Surrey. Also departing were Old Wellingtonians (5th in 2022–23) who withdrew from league competition.

In their place came Bec Old Boys and Old Georgians, promoted from Counties 4 Surrey whilst Effingham & Leatherhead and London Exiles joined having been relegated from Counties 2 Surrey. Old Emanuel re-joined the league structure after a sabbatical having most recently competed in London 3 South West in season 2021-22. With four leaving and five joining the league was made up of 10 sides having had 9 in its inaugural year.

Team	Ground	Capacity	City/Area	Previous season
Bec Old Boys	Ashcroft Technology Academy		Earlsfield, London	Promoted from Counties 4 Surrey (champions)
Economicals	LSE Sports Ground		New Malden, London	6th
Effingham & Leatherhead	King George V Playing Fields		Effingham, Surrey	Relegated from Counties 2 Surrey (11th)
London Exiles	Barn Elms	500	Barnes, London	Relegated from Counties 2 Surrey (12th)
London Media	Battersea Park		Battersea, London	8th
Metropolitan Police	Imber Court		Molesey, Surrey	7th
Old Emanuel	Raynes Park Sports Ground		Raynes Park, London	Re-entry
Old Georgians	St George's College		Addlestone, Surrey	Promoted from Counties 4 Surrey (runners-up)
Old Johnians	St John's School		Leatherhead, Surrey	4th
Worth Old Boys	North Avenue		Whiteley Village, Surrey	3rd

Locations of the 2023-24 Counties 3 Surrey teams in Greater London
Locations of the 2023-24 Counties 3 Surrey teams in Surrey

== Teams for 2022-23 ==
This was the first season following the RFU Adult Competition Review. The league was substantially similar to Surrey 2 but while that league had been at level 10 of the English rugby pyramid the new league was at level 9.

Seven of the teams had previously competed in Surrey 2 and they were joined from the top two from Surrey 3 - Old Caterhamians and Old Johnians.

Team	Ground	Capacity	City/Area	Previous season
Cranleigh	Wildwood Lane		Cranleigh, Surrey	8th Surrey 2
Economicals	LSE Sports Ground		New Malden, London	10th Surrey 2
London Media	Battersea Park		Battersea, London	9th Surrey 2
Metropolitan Police	Imber Court		Molesey, Surrey	7th Surrey 2
Old Caterhamians	Caterham School		Caterham, Surrey	Champions Surrey 3
Old Johnians	St John's School		Leatherhead, Surrey	Runners-up Surrey 3
Old Wellingtonians	Ruxley Lane		Epsom, Surrey	6th Surrey 2
Old Wimbledonians	Old Wimbledonians & Donhead Sports Ground		Raynes Park, London	4th Surrey 2
Worth Old Boys	North Avenue		Whiteley Village, Surrey	5th Surrey 2

Locations of the 2022-23 Counties 3 Surrey teams in Greater London
Locations of the 2022-23 Counties 3 Surrey teams in Surrey

== Teams for 2021-22 ==
The teams competing in 2021-22 achieved their places in the league based on performances in 2019-20, the 'previous season' column in the table below refers to that season not 2020-21.

Raynes Park withdrew from the league in October 2021, consequently it ran with nine teams instead.

Team	Ground	Capacity	City/Area	Previous season
Bec Old Boys	Ashcroft Technology Academy		Earlsfield, London	Relegated from Surrey 2 (9th)
Croydon	Addington Road		Addington, London	Promoted from Surrey 4 (champions)
Egham Hollowegians	Keith Heal Academy of Rugby		Englefield Green, Surrey	6th
Guildfordians	Guildford Spectrum Leisure Complex		Guildford, Surrey	3rd
Merton	Morden Recreation Ground		Morden, London	8th
Old Caterhamians	Caterham School		Caterham, Surrey	Relegated from Surrey 2 (10th)
Old Glynonians	Glyn School		Epsom, Surrey	7th
Old Johnians	St John's School		Leatherhead, Surrey	4th
Old Suttonians	Walch Memorial Ground		Cheam, London	5th
Raynes Park	Dornan Fields		Motspur Park, London	Promoted from Surrey 4 (runners up)

Locations of the 2021-22 Surrey 3 teams in Greater London
Locations of the 2021-22 Surrey 3 teams in Surrey

== Season 2020–21 ==
On 30 October the RFU announced that a decision had been taken to cancel Adult Competitive Leagues (National League 1 and below) for the 2020–21 season meaning Surrey 3 was not contested.

== Teams for 2019-20 ==
Team	Ground	Capacity	City/Area	Previous season
Egham Hollowegians	Keith Heal Academy of Rugby		Englefield Green, Surrey	Promoted from Surrey 4 (runners up)
Guildfordians	Guildford Spectrum Leisure Complex		Guildford, Surrey	7th
London Media	Battersea Park		Battersea, London	4th
Merton	Morden Recreation Ground		Morden, London	5th
Metropolitan Police	Imber Court		Molesey, Surrey	Relegated from Surrey 2 (9th)
Old Glynonians	Glyn School		Epsom, Surrey	8th
Old Johnians	St John's School		Leatherhead, Surrey	3rd
Old Paulines	Old Pauline Sports Ground		Thames Ditton, Surrey	6th
Old Suttonians	Walch Memorial Ground		Cheam, London	Promoted from Surrey 4 (champions)
Streatham-Croydon	Frant Road	2,000 (200 seats)	Thornton Heath, London	Relegated from Surrey 2 (10th)

Locations of the 2019-20 Surrey 3 teams in Greater London
Locations of the 2019-20 Surrey 3 teams in Surrey

== Teams for 2018-19 ==
Team	Ground	Capacity	City/Area	Previous season
Guildfordians	Guildford Spectrum Leisure Complex		Guildford, Surrey	Promoted from Surrey 4 (runners up)
London Media	Battersea Park		Battersea, London	8th
Merton	Morden Recreation Ground		Morden, London	5th
Old Caterhamians	Caterham School		Caterham, Surrey	3rd
Old Glynonians	Glyn School		Epsom, Surrey	9th
Old Johnians	St John's School		Leatherhead, Surrey	6th
Old Paulines	Old Pauline Sports Ground		Thames Ditton, Surrey	Relegated from Surrey 2 (10th)
Woking	Recreation Ground		Byfleet, Woking, Surrey	Promoted from Surrey 4 (champions)
Worth Old Boys	North Avenue		Whiteley Village, Surrey	4th

Locations of the 2018-19 Surrey 3 teams in Greater London
Locations of the 2018-19 Surrey 3 teams in Surrey

== Teams for 2017-18 ==
Team	Ground	Capacity	City/Area	Previous season
Croydon	Addington Road		Addington, London	8th
Horley	New Defence Sports Club		Horley, Surrey	Promoted from Surrey 4 (champions)
London Media	Battersea Park		Battersea, London	7th
Merton	Morden Recreation Ground		Morden, London	6th
Metropolitan Police	Imber Court		Molesey, Surrey	3rd
Old Caterhamians	Caterham School		Caterham, Surrey	Relegated from Surrey 2 (10th)
Old Glynonians	Glyn School		Epsom, Surrey	Promoted from Surrey 4 (runners up)
Old Johnians	St John's School		Leatherhead, Surrey	5th
Old Rutlishians	Old Rutlishians' Sports Ground		Merton Park, London	4th
Worth Old Boys	North Avenue		Whiteley Village, Surrey	Relegated from Surrey 2 (9th)

Locations of the 2017-18 Surrey 3 teams in Greater London
Locations of the 2017-18 Surrey 3 teams in Surrey

== Teams for 2016-17 ==
- Croydon (relegated from Surrey 2)
- Guildfordians (relegated from Surrey 2)
- London Media
- Merton
- Metropolitan Police
- Old Haileyburians (promoted from Surrey 4)
- Old Johnians (promoted from Surrey 4)
- Old Rutlishians
- Reeds Weybridge
- Reigate

== Teams for 2015-16 ==
- Bec Old Boys
- London Media
- Merton
- Metropolitan Police
- Mitcham & Carshalton
- Old Glynonians
- Old Rutlishians
- Reeds Weybridge (promoted from Surrey 4)
- Reigate (promoted from Surrey 4)
- Streatham-Croydon

== Teams for 2014-15 ==
- Bec Old Boys (relegated from Surrey 2)
- London Media
- Merton (promoted from Surrey 4)
- Metropolitan Police
- Mitcham
- Old Georgians (promoted from Surrey 4)
- Old Glynonians
- Old Rutlishians (relegated from Surrey 2)
- Streatham-Croydon (relegated from Surrey 2)
- Worth Old Boys

== Teams for 2013-14 ==
- Guildfordians
- London Media
- Metropolitan Police
- Mitcham
- Old Caterhamians
- Old Glynonians
- Old Haileyburians
- Old Radleian
- Raynes Park
- Worth Old Boys

== Teams for 2012-13 ==
- Economicals
- Guildfordians
- London Media
- Mitcham
- Old Amplefordians
- Old Caterhamians
- Old Haileyburians
- Old Radleian
- Raynes Park
- Reigate

== Teams for 2011-12 ==
- Economicals
- Haslemere
- London Media
- Mitcham
- Old Amplefordians
- Old Caterhamians
- Old Radleian
- Old Tonbridgians
- Raynes Park
- Streatham-Croydon

== Teams for 2010-11 ==
- Economicals
- London Media
- Merton
- Mitcham
- Old Amplefordians
- Old Glynonians
- Old Radleian
- Old Rutlishians
- Old Tonbridgians
- Worth Old Boys

== Teams for 2009-10 ==
- CL London - promoted from Surrey 4 in 2009
- Haslemere
- Merton
- Mitcham
- Old Amplefordians
- Old Oundelians
- Old Radleian
- Old Tiffinians
- Streatham-Croydon
- Worth Old Boys

== Original teams ==
When league rugby began in 1987 this division contained the following teams:

- Battersea Ironsides
- BBC
- Harrodians (Note: Harrodians would be renamed Barnes RFC from the 1992–93 season onward.)
- Haslemere
- Law Society
- Lightwater
- London Fire Brigade
- Old Caterhamians
- Old Croydonians
- Racal-Decca
- Reigate & Redhill
- Surrey Police

== Surrey 3 Honours ==
=== Surrey 3 (1987–1993) ===
The original Surrey 3 was tier 10 league, with promotion up to Surrey 2 (initially Surrey 2A and Surrey 2B) and relegation down to Surrey 4.

Surrey 3
Season	No of Teams	Champions	Runners–up	Relegated Teams
1987–88	12	Harrodians	Law Society	Lightwater, Racal-Decca
1988–89	10	Battersea Ironsides (Note: Changes to the Surrey leagues for the following season, including the restructuring of Surrey 2 and creation of Surrey 5 meant that champions Battersea Ironsides were not promoted.)	Old Caterhamians (Note: The restructuring of Surrey 2 and creation of Surrey 5 meant that runners up Old Caterhamians were actually relegated into Surrey 4.)	Multiple teams (Note: The restructuring of Surrey 2 and creation of Surrey 5 meant that nine teams were relegated. Old Caterhamians, Reigate & Redhill, Surrey Police, BBC, Old Bevonians, Old Croydonians, Shene Old Grammarians and London Fire Brigade dropped to Surrey 4, while Haslemere dropped to Surrey 5.)
1989–90	11	Shirley Wanderers	Farnham	King's College Hospital, Chipstead
1990–91	11	Old Reedonians	Kingston	Old Johnians, Old Suttonians
1991–92	10	Bec Old Boys	Reigate & Redhill (Note: Due to restructuring caused by the cancellation of Surrey 5 at the end of the season, six clubs were promoted including Old Haileyburians, Chobham, Old Wandsworthians and Old Bevonians.)	No relegation (Note: Restructuring due to the cancellation of Surrey 5 at the end of the season meant there was no relegation.)
1992–93	12	Old Caterhamians	Chipstead	Shene Old Grammarians (Note: Relegated Shene Old Grammarians would drop out of the league.)
Green backgrounds are promotion places.

=== Surrey 3 (1993–1996) ===
The creation of National 5 South meant that Surrey 3 dropped from a tier 10 league to a tier 11 league for the years that National 5 South was active. Promotion and relegation continued to Surrey 2 and Surrey 4 respectively.

Surrey 3
Season	No of Teams	Champions	Runners–up	Relegated Teams
1993–94	13	Woking	London Fire Brigade	Old Freemens, King's College Hospital
1994–95	11	Old Suttonians	Battersea Ironsides	Haslemere
1995–96	11	Old Freemens	London Media	Old Johnians, Croydon
Green backgrounds are promotion places.

=== Surrey 3 (1996–2000) ===
The cancellation of National 5 South at the end of the 1995–96 season meant that Surrey 3 reverted to being a tier 10 league. Promotion and relegation continued to Surrey 2 and Surrey 4 respectively.

Surrey 3
Season	No of Teams	Champions	Runners–up	Relegated Teams
1996–97	11	Old Wellingtonians	Reigate & Redhill	No relegation
1997–98	12	London Cornish	London Fire Brigade	Old Bevonians, Old Johnians
1998–99	11	Haslemere	Mitcham	No relegation
1999–00	11	Lightwater	Old Freemens	No relegation (Note: No relegation due to the cancellation of Surrey 4 at the end of the season.)
Green backgrounds are promotion places.

=== Surrey 3 (2000–2009) ===
The introduction of London 4 South West ahead of the 2000–01 season meant Surrey 3 dropped to become a tier 11 league. Promotion was to Surrey 2, while the cancellation of Surrey 4 at the end of the 1999–00 season, meant that there was no relegation until Surrey 4 was reinstated from the 2005–06 season onward.

Surrey 3
Season	No of Teams	Champions	Runners–up	Relegated Teams
2000–01	9	Old Amplefordians	Old Abingdonians	No relegation
2001–02	9	London Cornish	Reigate	No relegation
2002–03	10	Worth Old Boys	Chipstead (Note: Bec Old Boys were also promoted along with champions Worth Old Boys and runners up Chipstead.)	No relegation
2003–04	5	Wandsworthians	London Fire Brigade	No relegation
2004–05	8	Bec Old Boys (Note: Not promoted due to restructure to Surrey league - Surrey 4 re-instated. Bec Old Boys would remain in division along with teams dropping from Surrey 2.)	London Media (Note: Despite finishing second London Media would be victims of league restructuring due to the reinstatement of Surrey 4 - dropping down to the new division.)	Multiple teams (Note: Old Suttonians, Egham Hollowegians, Woking, Old Oundelians, Haslemere and Economicals were the relegated teams this year. This was due to the reinstatement of Surrey 4 for the 2005-06 season which meant that almost all teams in this division were relegated to populate the new league.)
2005–06	9	Bec Old Boys	Old Walcountians	No relegation (Note: No relegation as league increased from 9 to 10 teams for the next season.)
2006–07	10	London Media	Teddington 2nd XV	Lightwater, Wandsworthians, Pelhamians
2007–08	10	Old Cranleighans	Old Haileyburians	Guildfordians, Woking
2008–09	10	Old Blues	Raynes Park	Reigate, Haslemere (Note: Haslemere would drop out of the league for the next season.)
Green backgrounds are promotion places.

=== Surrey 3 (2009–present) ===
Surrey 3 remained a tier 11 league despite national restructuring by the RFU. Promotion and relegation continued to Surrey 2 and Surrey 4 respectively.

Surrey 3
Season	No of Teams	Champions	Runners–up	Relegated Teams
2009–10	9	CL London	Old Tiffinians	Old Oundelians, Streatham-Croydon
2010–11	10	Worth Old Boys	Old Rutlishians	Merton, Old Glynonians, Mitcham
2011–12	9	Streatham-Croydon	Old Tonbridgians	No relegation
2012–13	10	Old Amplefordians	Economicals	Reigate, Old Radleian (Note: Old Radleian would drop out of the league for the next season.)
2013–14	9	Old Caterhamians	Guildfordians	Raynes Park, Old Haileyburians
2014–15	10	Old Georgians	Worth Old Boys	No relegation
2015–16	10	Streatham-Croydon	Bec Old Boys	Old Glynonians, Mitcham & Carshalton
2016–17	10	Old Haileyburians	Reeds Weybridge	Reigate, Guildfordians
2017–18	10	Metropolitan Police	Old Rutlishians	Croydon (Note: Despite finishing 7th, Horley also dropped down to Surrey 4.)
2018–19	9 (Note: Reduced from 10 to 9 teams after Horley dropped down to Surrey 4.)	Worth Old Boys	Old Caterhamians	Woking
2019–20	10	London Media	Metropolitan Police	Old Paulines, Streatham-Croydon
2020–21	9	Old Caterhamians	Old Johnians	
Green backgrounds are promotion places.

== Number of league titles ==
- Bec Old Boys (3)
- Old Caterhamians (3)
- Worth Old Boys (3)
- London Media (2)
- Old Amplefordians (2)
- London Cornish (2)
- Streatham-Croydon (2)
- Battersea Ironsides (1)
- CL London (1)
- Harrodians (1)
- Haslemere (1)
- Lightwater (1)
- Metropolitan Police (1)
- Old Blues (1)
- Old Cranleighans (1)
- Old Freemens (1)
- Old Georgians (1)
- Old Haileyburians (1)
- Old Reedonians (1)
- Old Suttonians (1)
- Old Wellingtonians (1)
- Shirley Wanderers (1)
- Wandsworthians (1)
- Woking (1)

== See also ==
- London & SE Division RFU
- Surrey RFU
- English rugby union system
- Rugby union in England
