= Counties 2 Surrey =

Level 8 English Rugby Union League

Counties Surrey 2
- Current season or competition: 2019–20 Surrey 2
- Sport: Rugby union
- Instituted: 1987; 39 years ago
- Number of teams: 12
- Country: England
- Holders: Chipstead RFC ( 2nd title) (2021-22) (promoted to Surrey 1)
- Most titles: Old Amplefordians (3 titles)
- Website: englandrugby.com

Counties 2 Surrey is a level 8 English Rugby Union League. It is made up of teams predominantly from Surrey and south-west London. Teams play home and away matches from September through to April. Promoted teams move up to Counties 1 Surrey/Sussex while relegated teams drop down to Counties 3 Surrey. It was previously known as Surrey 2 and a 10 team team league prior to the RFU Adult Competition Review.

Each year some of the clubs in this division also take part in the RFU Junior Vase - a level 9-12 national competition.

== Teams for 2026–27 ==
Departing were champions Old Hamptonians and runners-up Bec Old Boys, both promoted to Counties 1 Surrey/Sussex while Old Cranleighan (12th) were relegated to Counties 3 Surrey.

Team	Ground	Capacity	City/Area	Previous season
Chipstead	Chipstead Meads Recreation Ground		Chipstead, Surrey	7th
Effingham & Leatherhead	King George V Playing Fields		Effingham, Surrey	Promoted from Counties 3 Surrey (runners-up)
KCS Old Boys	Dornan Fields		Motspur Park, London	Relegated from Counties 1 Sur/Ssx (11th)
Metropolitan Police	Imber Court		Molesey, Surrey	10th
OH Exiles	Dornan Fields		Motspur Park, London	5th
Old Amplefordians	Dornan Fields		Motspur Park, London	6th
Old Blues	Dornan Fields		Motspur Park, London	11th
Old Walcountians	Clockhouse Ground		Woodmansterne, Surrey	4th
Old Whitgiftian	Whitgift Sports Club		South Croydon, London	3rd
Purley John Fisher	Parsons Pightle		Old Coulsdon, London	9th
Thamesians	Twickenham Green		Twickenham, London	Promoted from Counties 3 Surrey (champions)
Worth Old Boys	North Avenue		Whiteley Village, Surrey	8th

Locations of the 2026–27 Counties 2 Surrey teams in Greater London
Locations of the 2026–27 Counties 2 Surrey teams in Surrey

== Teams for 2025–26 ==
Departing were Old Caterhamians and Old Wimbledonians, both promoted to Counties 1 Surrey/Sussex while Kingston (12th) were relegated to Counties 3 Surrey.

Old Haileyburians joined the league having been relegated from Counties 1 Surrey/Sussex. However, in the off-season Haileyburians folded owing to financial challenges with OH Exiles forming as a phoenix club vacating the Ruxley Lane ground but inheriting the defunct club's league position.

Team	Ground	Capacity	City/Area	Previous season
Bec Old Boys	Ashcroft Technology Academy		Earlsfield, London	8th
Chipstead	Chipstead Meads Recreation Ground		Chipstead, Surrey	3rd
Metropolitan Police	Imber Court		Molesey, Surrey	7th
OH Exiles	Dornan Fields		Motspur Park, London	Relegated from Counties 1 Sur/Ssx (12th)
Old Amplefordians	Dornan Fields		Motspur Park, London	6th
Old Blues	Dornan Fields		Motspur Park, London	11th
Old Cranleighan	Old Cranleighan Sports Club		Thames Ditton, Surrey	10th
Old Hamptonians	Dean Road		Hampton, London	Promoted from Counties 3 Surrey (runners-up)
Old Walcountians	Clockhouse Ground		Woodmansterne, Surrey	9th
Old Whitgiftian	Whitgift Sports Club		South Croydon, London	5th
Purley John Fisher	Parsons Pightle		Old Coulsdon, London	4th
Worth Old Boys	North Avenue		Whiteley Village, Surrey	Promoted from Counties 3 Surrey (champions)

Locations of the 2025-26 Counties 2 Surrey teams in Greater London
Locations of the 2025-26 Counties 2 Surrey teams in Surrey

== Teams for 2024-25 ==
Leaving the league were Old Haileyburians and Old Rutlishians, both promoted to Counties 1 Surrey/Sussex; Warlingham and Law Society were relegated to Counties 3 Surrey. Also departing were Old Freemans who finished 12th in the previous season and suffered a double relegation to Counties 4 Surrey. Joining in their place were Old Walcountians, Kingston and Old Cranleighan, all relegated from Counties 1 Surrey/Sussex and Bec Old Boys and Met Police promoted from Counties 3 Surrey.

Team	Ground	Capacity	City/Area	Previous season
Bec Old Boys	Ashcroft Technology Academy		Earlsfield, London	Promoted from Counties 3 Surrey (champions)
Chipstead	Chipstead Meads Recreation Ground		Chipstead, Surrey	4th
Kingston	Hook Road		Chessington, London	Relegated from Counties 1 Sur/Ssx (11th)
Metropolitan Police	Imber Court		Molesey, Surrey	Promoted from Counties 3 Surrey (runners-up)
Old Amplefordians	Dornan Fields		Motspur Park, London	9th
Old Blues	Dornan Fields		Motspur Park, London	8th
Old Caterhamians	Caterham School		Caterham, Surrey	3rd
Old Cranleighan	Old Cranleighan Sports Club		Thames Ditton, Surrey	Relegated from Counties 1 Sur/Ssx (12th)
Old Walcountians	Clockhouse Ground		Woodmansterne, Surrey	Relegated from Counties 1 Sur/Ssx (10th)
Old Whitgiftian	Whitgift Sports Club		South Croydon, London	7th
Old Wimbledonians	Old Wimbledonians & Donhead Sports Ground		Raynes Park, London	6th
Purley John Fisher	Parsons Pightle		Old Coulsdon, London	5th

Locations of the 2024-25 Counties 2 Surrey teams in Greater London
Locations of the 2024-25 Counties 2 Surrey teams in Surrey

== Teams for 2023-24 ==
Leaving the league were Effingham and Leatherhead and London Exiles, relegated to Counties 3 Surrey, whilst Teddington were promoted to Counties 1 Surrey/Sussex. In their place came Old Wimbledonians and Old Caterhamians, promoted from Counties 3 Surrey whilst Warlingham came down from Counties 1 Surrey/Sussex.

Team	Ground	Capacity	City/Area	Previous season
Chipstead	Chipstead Meads Recreation Ground		Chipstead, Surrey	2nd
Law Society	King's College Sportsground		New Malden, London	8th
Old Amplefordians	Dornan Fields		Motspur Park, London	6th
Old Blues	Dornan Fields		Motspur Park, London	9th
Old Caterhamians	Caterham School		Caterham, Surrey	Promoted from Counties 3 Surrey (runners-up)
Old Freemens	Ashtead Park		Ashtead, Surrey	10th
Old Haileyburians	Ruxley Lane		Epsom, Surrey	7th
Old Rutlishians	Old Rutlishians' Sports Ground		Merton Park, London	3rd
Old Whitgiftian	Whitgift Sports Club		South Croydon, London	5th
Old Wimbledonians	Old Wimbledonians & Donhead Sports Ground		Raynes Park, London	Promoted from Counties 3 Surrey (champions)
Purley John Fisher	Parsons Pightle		Old Coulsdon, London	4th
Warlingham	Limpsfield Road		Warlingham, Surrey	Relegated from Counties 1 Surrey/Sussex (10th)

Locations of the 2023-24 Counties 2 Surrey teams in Greater London
Locations of the 2023-24 Counties 2 Surrey teams in Surrey

== Teams for 2022-23 ==
This was the first season following the RFU Adult Competition Review. The league was substantially similar to Surrey 1 but while that league had been at level 9 of the English rugby pyramid the new league was at level 8 with London 3 South West which had been the league Surrey, Hampshire and West Sussex clubs were promoted to out of their level 9 county leagues disappearing.

Part of the ACR adjustments meant the league was increased from 10 teams to 12. Eight of the teams had previously competed in Surrey 1 and they were joined from the top three from Surrey 2 as well as London Exiles, a re-entry having withdrawn from London 2 South West in season 2021–22.

Team	Ground	Capacity	City/Area	Previous season
Chipstead	Chipstead Meads Recreation Ground		Chipstead, Surrey	Promoted from Surrey 2 (champions)
Effingham & Leatherhead	King George V Playing Fields		Effingham, Surrey	10th Surrey 1
Law Society	King's College Sportsground		New Malden, London	9th Surrey 1
London Exiles	Barn Elms	500	Barnes, London	Re-entry
Old Amplefordians	Dornan Fields		Motspur Park, London	3rd Surrey 1
Old Blues	Dornan Fields		Motspur Park, London	Promoted from Surrey 2 (runners-up)
Old Freemens	Ashtead Park		Ashtead, Surrey	Promoted from Surrey 2 (3rd)
Old Haileyburians	Ruxley Lane		Epsom, Surrey	6th Surrey 1
Old Rutlishians	Old Rutlishians' Sports Ground		Merton Park, London	4th Surrey 1
Old Whitgiftian	Whitgift Sports Club		South Croydon, London	8th Surrey 1
Purley John Fisher	Parsons Pightle		Old Coulsdon, London	5th Surrey 1
Teddington	Udney Park Sports Ground		Teddington, London	7th Surrey 1

Locations of the 2022-23 Counties 2 Surrey teams in Greater London
Locations of the 2022-23 Counties 2 Surrey teams in Surrey

== Teams for 2021-22 ==
The teams competing in 2021-22 achieved their places in the league based on performances in 2019–20, the 'previous season' column in the table below refers to that season not 2020–21.

Team	Ground	Capacity	City/Area	Previous season
Chipstead	Chipstead Meads Recreation Ground		Chipstead, Surrey	Relegated from Surrey 1 (10th)
Cranleigh	Wildwood Lane		Cranleigh, Surrey	5th
Economicals	LSE Sports Ground		New Malden, London	8th
London Media	Battersea Park		Battersea, London	Promoted from Surrey 3 (champions)
Metropolitan Police	Imber Court		Molesey, Surrey	Promoted from Surrey 3 (runners-up)
Old Blues	Dornan Fields		Motspur Park, London	3rd
Old Freemens	Ashtead Park		Ashtead, Surrey	Relegated from Surrey 1 (9th)
Old Wellingtonians	Ruxley Lane		Epsom, Surrey	4th
Old Wimbledonians	Old Wimbledonians & Donhead Sports Ground		Raynes Park, London	7th
Worth Old Boys	North Avenue		Whiteley Village, Surrey	6th

Locations of the 2021-22 Surrey 2 teams in Greater London
Locations of the 2021-22 Surrey 2 teams in Surrey

== Season 2020–21 ==
On 30 October the RFU announced that a decision had been taken to cancel Adult Competitive Leagues (National League 1 and below) for the 2020/21 season meaning Surrey 2 was not contested.

== Teams for 2019-20 ==
Team	Ground	Capacity	City/Area	Previous season
Bec Old Boys	Ashcroft Technology Academy		Earlsfield, London	8th
Cranleigh	Wildwood Lane		Cranleigh, Surrey	4th
Economicals	LSE Sports Ground		New Malden, London	7th
Old Amplefordians	Dornan Fields		Motspur Park, London	Relegated from Surrey 1 (9th)
Old Blues	Dornan Fields		Motspur Park, London	3rd
Old Caterhamians	Caterham School		Caterham, Surrey	Promoted from Surrey 3 (runners up)
Old Rutlishians	Old Rutlishians' Sports Ground		Merton Park, London	6th
Old Wellingtonians	Ruxley Lane		Epsom, Surrey	5th
Old Wimbledonians	Old Wimbledonians & Donhead Sports Ground		Raynes Park, London	Relegated from Surrey 1 (10th)
Worth Old Boys	North Avenue		Whiteley Village, Surrey	Promoted from Surrey 3 (champions)

Locations of the 2019-20 Surrey 2 teams in Greater London
Locations of the 2019-20 Surrey 2 teams in Surrey

== Teams for 2018-19 ==
Team	Ground	Capacity	City/Area	Previous season
Bec Old Boys	Ashcroft Technology Academy		Earlsfield, London	9th (not relegated)
Cranleigh	Wildwood Lane		Cranleigh, Surrey	3rd
Economicals	LSE Sports Ground		New Malden, London	8th
Kingston	Hook Road		Chessington, London	7th
Metropolitan Police	Imber Court		Molesey, Surrey	Promoted from Surrey 3 (champions)
Old Blues	Dornan Fields		Motspur Park, London	Relegated from Surrey 1 (10th)
Old Rutlishians	Old Rutlishians' Sports Ground		Merton Park, London	Promoted from Surrey 3 (runners up)
Old Wellingtonians	Ruxley Lane		Epsom, Surrey	4th
Purley John Fisher	Parsons Pightle		Old Coulsdon, London	5th
Streatham-Croydon	Frant Road	1,400 (200 seats)	Thornton Heath, London	6th

Locations of the 2018-19 Surrey 2 teams in Greater London
Locations of the 2018-19 Surrey 2 teams in Surrey

== Teams for 2017-18 ==
Team	Ground	Capacity	City/Area	Previous season
Bec Old Boys	Ashcroft Technology Academy		Earlsfield, London	3rd
Cranleigh	Wildwood Lane		Cranleigh, Surrey	4th
Economicals	LSE Sports Ground		New Malden, London	7th
Kingston	Hook Road		Chessington, London	6th
Old Haileyburians	Ruxley Lane		Epsom, Surrey	Promoted from Surrey 3 (champions)
Old Paulines	Old Pauline Sports Ground		Thames Ditton, Surrey	8th
Old Wellingtonians	Ruxley Lane		Epsom, Surrey	Relegated from Surrey 1 (10th)
Purley John Fisher	Parsons Pightle		Old Coulsdon, London	Relegated from Surrey 1 (11th)
Reeds Weybridge	North Avenue		Whiteley Village, Surrey	Promoted from Surrey 3 (runners up)
Streatham-Croydon	Frant Road	1,400 (200 seats)	Thornton Heath, London	5th

Locations of the 2017-18 Surrey 2 teams in Greater London
Locations of the 2017-18 Surrey 2 teams in Surrey

== Teams for 2016-2017 ==
- Bec Old Boys (promoted from Surrey 3)
- Cranleigh
- Economicals
- Kingston (relegated from Surrey 1)
- Old Blues
- Old Caterhamians
- Old Paulines (relegated from Surrey 1)
- Old Walcountians
- Streatham-Croydon R.F.C. (promoted top from Surrey 3)
- Worth Old Boys

== Teams for 2015-2016 ==
- Cranleigh
- Croydon
- Economicals
- Guildfordians
- Old Amplefordians
- Old Blues
- Old Caterhamians
- Old Georgians (promoted from Surrey 3)
- Old Walcountians
- Worth Old Boys (promoted from Surrey 3)

== Teams for 2014-2015 ==
- Cranleigh
- Croydon
- Economicals
- Guildfordians (promoted from Surrey 3)
- Old Amplefordians
- Old Blues (relegated from Surrey 1)
- Old Caterhamians (promoted from Surrey 3)
- Old Emanuel
- Old Freemans (relegated from Surrey 1)
- Old Walcountians (relegated from Surrey 1)

== Teams for 2013-2014 ==
- Bec Old Boys
- Chipstead
- Croydon
- Economicals
- Law Society
- Old Amplefordians
- Old Emanuel
- Old Rutlishians
- Stretham Croydon
- Worth Old Boys

== Teams for 2012-2013 ==
- Battersea Ironsides
- Bec Old Boys
- Chipstead
- CL London
- Law Society
- Old Emanuel
- Old Rutlishians
- Old Tonbridgians
- Stretham Croydon
- Worth Old Boys

== Original teams ==
When league rugby began in 1987 this division was split into two groups (Surrey 2A and Surrey 2B) containing the following teams:

Surrey 2A

- Charing Cross & Westminster Hospitals (Note: Would merge with St Mary's Hospital in 1997 to form Imperial Medicals Rugby Club.)
- Chobham
- Effingham
- Kingston
- Old Freemens
- Old Haileyburians
- Old Reedonians (Note: Old Reedonians would later be renamed Reeds Weybridge RFC.)
- Raynes Park
- Shene Old Grammarians
- Weybridge Vandals
- Wimbledon

Surrey 2B

- Bec Old Boys
- Chipstead
- King's College Hospital
- Merton
- Mitcham
- Old Bevonians
- Old Epsomians
- Old Johnians
- Old Pelhamians
- Old Suttonians
- Old Wandsworthians
- Shirley Wanderers

== Surrey 2 honours ==
=== Surrey 2A / 2B (1987–1989) ===
The original Surrey 2 was tier 9 league, split into two groups (Surrey 2A, Surrey 2B), with promotion up to Surrey 1 and relegation down to Surrey 3.

Surrey 2A / 2B
Season	No of Teams	Champions	Runners–up	Relegated Teams	League Name
1987–88	11	Effingham	Wimbledon	Shene Old Grammarians	Surrey 2A
1987–88	12	Merton	Mitcham	Old Bevonians	Surrey 2B
1988–89	11	Harrodians	Wimbledon	Multiple teams (Note: The restructuring of Surrey 2 into a single division for the following season meant that five teams were relegated from Surrey 2A including Chobham, Farnham, Kingston, Old Freemans and Old Reedonians.)	Surrey 2A
1988–89	12	John Fisher Old Boys	Old Wandsworthians	Multiple teams (Note: The restructuring of Surrey 2 into a single division for the following season meant that six teams were relegated from Surrey 2B including Old Epsomians, Old Suttonians, King's College Hospital, Chipstead, Shirley Wanderers and Old Pelhamians.)	Surrey 2B
Green backgrounds are promotion places.

=== Surrey 2 (1989–1993) ===
Surrey 2A and 2B were merged into a single division called Surrey 2. It remained a tier 9 league, with promotion to Surrey 1 and relegation to Surrey 3.

Surrey 2
Season	No of Teams	Champions	Runners–up	Relegated Teams
1989–90	11	Wimbledon	Raynes Park	Bec Old Boys, Old Johnians
1990–91	11	Shirley Wanderers	Mitcham	Old Haileyburians, Old Wandsworthians
1991–92	11	Kingston	Old Reedonians (Note: The restructuring of the Surrey leagues meant that 3rd and 4th place Weybridge Vandals and Cobham were also promoted.)	No relegation (Note: The restructuring of the Surrey leagues meant that there was no relegation.)
1992–93	13	Harrodians (Note: Champions Harrodians would be renamed as Barnes RFC for the following season.)	Chobham	Old Bevonians
Green backgrounds are promotion places.

=== Surrey 2 (1993–1996) ===
The creation of National 5 South meant that Surrey 2 dropped from a tier 9 league to a tier 10 league for the years that National 5 South was active. Promotion and relegation continued to Surrey 1 and Surrey 3 respectively.

Surrey 2
Season	No of Teams	Champions	Runners–up	Relegated Teams
1993–94	13	Old Cranleighans	Farnham	Charing Cross & Westminster Hospitals (Note: Relegated Charing Cross & Westminster Hospitals would drop out of the Surrey leagues.)
1994–95	13	Old Caterhamians	Woking	Reigate & Redhill, London Fire Brigade
1995–96	13	Chipstead	Battersea Ironsides	Mitcham, Bec Old Boys
Green backgrounds are promotion places.

=== Surrey 2 (1996–2000) ===
The cancellation of National 5 South at the end of the 1995–96 season meant that Surrey 2 reverted to being a tier 9 league. Promotion and relegation continued to Surrey 1 and Surrey 3 respectively.

Surrey 2
Season	No of Teams	Champions	Runners–up	Relegated Teams
1996–97	13	Raynes Park	Old Wandsworthians (Note: 3rd place Farnham were also promoted.)	No relegation
1997–98	13	Cobham	Merton	Old Freemens, Old Suttonians
1998–99	13	Old Tiffinians	Kingston	London Cornish, Reigate
1999–00	13	Old Wellingtonians	Old Rutlishians	No relegation (Note: No relegation due to league restructuring for the following season as Surrey 4 abolished and extra teams added to Surrey 2 (and other divisions) as a result.)
Green backgrounds are promotion places.

=== Surrey 2 (2000–2009) ===
The introduction of London 4 South West ahead of the 2000–01 season meant Surrey 2 dropped to become a tier 10 league. Promotion and relegation continued to Surrey 1 and Surrey 3 respectively.

Surrey 2
Season	No of Teams	Champions	Runners–up	Relegated Teams
2000–01	15	Law Society	Battersea Ironsides	Wandsworthians, Worth Old Boys
2001–02	15	London Exiles	Old Freemens	Chipstead, Haslemere, London Fire Brigade
2002–03	15	Old Amplefordians	Streatham-Croydon	London Media, Woking (Note: Woking dropped out of the league at the end of the season.)
2003–04	15	London Cornish	Old Haileyburians	No relegation
2004–05	15	Croydon (Note: Neither Croydon nor runners up Chipstead promoted as Surrey 4 was reinstated for the next season leading to restructuring to all divisions.)	Chipstead	Multiple teams (Note: Teddington 2nd XV, Merton, Lightwater, Old Abingdonians, Guildfordians, London Fire Brigade, Worth Old Boys, Wandsworthians, Reigate, Old Walcountians and Raynes Park were the relegated teams this year. The reason for so many relegation's was due to reinstatement of Surrey 4 for the 2005-06 season with teams from Surrey 3 dropping to the new division and the relegated Surrey 2 teams replacing them.)
2005–06	10	Croydon	Old Alleynians	Old Cranleighans
2006–07	10	Old Whitgiftian	Old Freemens	Mitcham, Streatham-Croydon, Old Haileyburians
2007–08	10	Bec Old Boys	Chipstead	Old Tiffinians, Old Blues
2008–09	9	Teddington	Old Walcountians	Law Society
Green backgrounds are promotion places.

=== Surrey 2 (2009–present) ===
Surrey 2 remained a tier 10 league despite national restructuring by the RFU. Promotion and relegation continued to Surrey 1 and Surrey 3 respectively.

Surrey 2
Season	No of Teams	Champions	Runners–up	Relegated Teams
2009–10	10	Old Blues	Cranleigh	Old Rutlishians, London Media
2010–11	10	CL London	Old Tiffinians	Old Caterhamians, Raynes Park
2011–12	10	Old Cranleighans	Farnham	Old Haileyburians
2012–13	9	Battersea Ironsides	Old Tonbridgians	Worth Old Boys
2013–14	10	Law Society	Chipstead	Streatham-Croydon, Bec Old Boys, Old Rutlishians
2014–15	10	Old Freemens	Old Emanuel	No relegation
2015–16	10	Old Amplefordians	Old Georgians	Croydon, Guildfordians
2016–17	10	Old Blues	Old Walcountians	Old Caterhamians, Worth Old Boys
2017–18	10	Reeds Weybridge	Old Haileyburians	Old Paulines
2018–19	10	Purley John Fisher	Kingston	Streatham-Croydon, Metropolitan Police
2019–20	10	Old Amplefordians	Old Rutlishians	Old Caterhamians, Bec Old Boys
2020–21	10			
Green backgrounds are promotion places.

== Number of league titles ==
- Old Amplefordians (3)
- Croydon (2)
- Harrodians (Note: One of Harrodians titles was for Surrey 2A.)
- Law Society (2)
- Old Blues (2)
- Old Cranleighans (2)
- Purley John Fisher (2) (Note: One of Purley John Fisher's titles was won by founder club John Fisher Old Boys RFC and was for Surrey 2B.)
- Battersea Ironsides (1)
- Bec Old Boys (1)
- Chipstead (1)
- CL London (1)
- Cobham (1)
- Effingham (1) (Note: Effingham's title was for Surrey 2A.)
- Kingston (1)
- London Cornish (1)
- London Exiles (1)
- Merton (1) (Note: Merton's title was for Surrey 2B.)
- Old Caterhamians (1)
- Old Freemens (1)
- Old Tiffinians (1)
- Old Wellingtonians (1)
- Old Whitgiftian (1)
- Raynes Park (1)
- Reeds Weybridge (1)
- Shirley Wanderers (1)
- Teddington (1)
- Wimbledon (1)

== See also ==
- London & SE Division RFU
- Surrey RFU
- English rugby union system
- Rugby union in England
