= Counties 5 Surrey =

English rugby union league

- Sport: Rugby union
- Instituted: 1989; 37 years ago
- Ceased: 1992; 34 years ago
- Re-formed: 2022
- Number of teams: 9
- Country: England
- Holders: Kew Occasionals RFC (1st title) (1991–92)

Counties 5 Surrey is a rugby union competition covering the English county of Surrey and parts of south-west London. It sits at the bottom of English Rugby union system, at level 11, making it the lowest level competition still controlled by the Rugby Football Union (RFU). The winner of the league is promoted for the following season to Counties 4 Surrey. There is no relegation from the league, and no promotion into it, however new teams can apply to join.

The league was first formed in the 1989–90 season and ran for three years before its closure at the end of the 1991–1992 season. When the league was disbanded, teams were either automatically promoted to Surrey 4, moved to other leagues, or folded.

As part of a larger restructuring of the entire English rugby union pyramid, undertaken by the RFU, the league was re-formed. Beginning with the 2022–23 season, nine teams from Surrey and south-west London compete in the division.

== Teams for 2026–27 ==
Departing were Old Paulines and Economicals both promoted to Counties 4 Surrey.

Feltham (8th in 2025–26) were initially allocated a place in the league but withdrew before the season began preferring to return to the Surrey RFU reserve leagues.

Team	Ground	Capacity	City/Area	Previous season
Egham Hollowegians	Keith Heal Academy of Rugby		Englefield Green, Surrey	5th
Guildfordians	Guildford Spectrum Leisure Complex		Guildford, Surrey	4th
Harlequin Amateurs	Bushy Park		Hampton Wick, London	Re-entry
London French	Barn Elms		Barnes, London	Relegated from Counties 4 Surrey (9th)
Merton	Morden Recreation Ground		Morden, London	6th
Mitcham & Carshalton	Peterborough Road		Carshalton, London	7th
Wandsworthians	Imber Court Sports Ground		Thames Ditton, London	3rd

Locations of the 2026–27 Counties 5 Surrey teams in Greater London
Locations of the 2026–27 Counties 5 Surrey teams in Surrey

== Teams for 2025–26 ==
Departing were Staines and Woking both promoted to Counties 4 Surrey.

Croydon (8th in 2024–25) did not return for the new season instead joining Kent Rugby reserve leagues.

Harlequin Amateurs who had been demoted from Counties 4 Surrey (5th) in 2024-25 contested matches until November however after awarding several walkovers withdrew from the league in January. Around the same time Raynes Park also elected to withdraw from the league having been similarly unable to fulfil games leaving 8 clubs to contest the outstanding fixtures.

Team	Ground	Capacity	City/Area	Previous season
Economicals	LSE Sports Ground		New Malden, London	Demoted from Counties 3 Surrey (9th)
Egham Hollowegians	Keith Heal Academy of Rugby		Englefield Green, Surrey	4th
Feltham	The Airpark		Feltham, London	6th
Guildfordians	Guildford Spectrum Leisure Complex		Guildford, Surrey	3rd
Merton	Morden Recreation Ground		Morden, London	10th
Mitcham & Carshalton	Peterborough Road		Carshalton, London	5th
Old Paulines	Old Pauline Sports Ground		Thames Ditton, Surrey	Relegated from Counties 4 Surrey (10th)
Wandsworthians	Imber Court Sports Ground		Thames Ditton, London	7th

Locations of the 2025-26 Counties 5 Surrey teams in Greater London
Locations of the 2025-26 Counties 5 Surrey teams in Surrey

== Teams for 2024–25 ==
Leaving the league are Reigate and London French (promoted to Counties 4 Surrey), replaced by Guilfordians and Staines both relegated from the same league. Feltham joined for the first time having previously competed in Surrey Conference League 2023-2024.

With two leaving and three joining the league was made up of 10 sides for the first time having had 9 since its inaugural year.

Team	Ground	Capacity	City/Area	Previous season
Croydon	Addington Road		Addington, London	6th
Egham Hollowegians	Keith Heal Academy of Rugby		Englefield Green, Surrey	5th
Feltham	The Airpark		Feltham, London	New entry
Guildfordians	Guildford Spectrum Leisure Complex		Guildford, Surrey	Relegated from Counties 4 Surrey (9th)
Merton	Morden Recreation Ground		Morden, London	8th
Mitcham & Carshalton	Peterborough Road		Carshalton, London	7th
Raynes Park	Raynes Park Sports Ground		Raynes Park, London	2nd
Staines	The Reeves		Feltham, London	Relegated from Counties 4 Surrey (10th)
Wandsworthians	Old Wimbledonians & Donhead Sports Ground		Raynes Park, London	9th
Woking	Recreation Ground		Byfleet, Woking, Surrey	4th

Locations of the 2024-25 Counties 5 Surrey teams in Greater London
Locations of the 2024-25 Counties 5 Surrey teams in Surrey

== Teams for 2023–24 ==
Leaving the league were Old Hamptonians and Haslemere, both promoted to Counties 4 Surrey replaced by Croydon, relegated from Counties 4 Surrey and London French who had most recently competed in Herts & Middlesex 2 in 2021-22.

Team	Ground	Capacity	City/Area	Previous season
Croydon	Addington Road		Addington, London	Relegated from Counties 4 Surrey (8th)
Egham Hollowegians	Keith Heal Academy of Rugby		Englefield Green, Surrey	4th
London French	Barn Elms		Barnes, London	Re-entry
Merton	Morden Recreation Ground		Morden, London	6th
Mitcham & Carshalton	Peterborough Road		Carshalton, London	9th
Raynes Park	Old Wimbledonians & Donhead Sports Ground		Raynes Park, London	3rd
Reigate	Colley Lane		Reigate, Surrey	5th
Wandsworthians	Old Wimbledonians & Donhead Sports Ground		Raynes Park, London	8th
Woking	Recreation Ground		Byfleet, Woking, Surrey	7th

Locations of the 2023-24 Counties 5 Surrey teams in Greater London
Locations of the 2023-24 Counties 5 Surrey teams in Surrey

== Teams for 2022–23 ==
This was the first season following the RFU Adult Competition Review. The league was substantially similar to Surrey 4 but while that league had been at level 12 of the English rugby pyramid the new league was at level 11.

Six of the teams had previously competed in Surrey 4 and they were joined by three sides from Surrey 3 - Egham Hollowegians, Merton and Raynes Park - who remained in a level 11 league.

Team	Ground	Capacity	City/Area	Previous season
Egham Hollowegians	Keith Heal Academy of Rugby		Englefield Green, Surrey	Surrey 3 (9th)
Haslemere	Woolmer Hill Sports Association		Haslemere, Surrey	Surrey 4 (6th)
Merton	Morden Recreation Ground		Morden, London	Surrey 3 (6th)
Mitcham & Carshalton	Peterborough Road		Carshalton, London	Surrey 4 (5th)
Old Hamptonians	Dean Road		Hampton, London	Surrey 4 (4th)
Raynes Park	Old Wimbledonians & Donhead Sports Ground		Raynes Park, London	Surrey 3 (10th)
Reigate	Colley Lane		Reigate, Surrey	Surrey 4 (7th)
Wandsworthians	Old Wimbledonians & Donhead Sports Ground		Raynes Park, London	Surrey 4 (9th)
Woking	Recreation Ground		Byfleet, Woking, Surrey	Surrey 4 (8th)

Locations of the 2022-23 Counties 5 Surrey teams in Greater London
Locations of the 2022-23 Counties 5 Surrey teams in Surrey

== Original teams ==
When the competition began in 1989, the following teams played in the division:

- Economicals - relegated from Surrey 4
- Gibraltar Engineers - new to league
- Haslemere - relegated from Surrey 3
- Lightwater - relegated from Surrey 3
- Oxted - relegated from Surrey 3
- Racal-Decca - relegated from Surrey 3
- Woking - new to league

== Surrey 5 honours ==
Season	No of Teams	Champions	Runners–up	Relegated Teams
1989–90	7	Gibraltar Engineers	Racal-Decca	No relegation
1990–91	7	Woking	Shene Old Grammarians	No relegation
1991–92	10	Kew Occasionals	London Media	No relegation
2022–23	9	Old Hamptonians	Haslemere	No relegation
Green backgrounds are promotion places.

== Number of league titles ==
- Gibraltar Engineers (1)
- Woking (1)
- Kew Occasionals (1)

== See also ==
- London & SE Division RFU
- Surrey RFU
- English rugby union system
- Rugby union in England
