= Counties 4 Surrey =

Level 12 English Rugby Union League

- Sport: Rugby union
- Instituted: 1988; 38 years ago
- Number of teams: 9
- Country: England
- Holders: Streatham-Croydon (2nd title) (2021–22)
- Most titles: Haslemere; Old Bevonians; Old Glynonians; Streatham-Croydon; University of Surrey (2 titles)
- Website: englandrugby.com

Counties 4 Surrey is a rugby union competition covering the English county of Surrey and parts of south-west London. It sits at the 10th tier of the English rugby union system. The teams play home and away matches from September through to April. Promoted teams move up to Surrey 3 and relegated teams move down to Counties 5 Surrey. At the end of the 1999–2000 season, Surrey 4 was cancelled with teams automatically going up to Surrey 3 or dropping out of the league. After a hiatus of four seasons the division was reinstated.

Each year some of the clubs in this division also take part in the RFU Junior Vase – a level 9–11 national competition.

== Teams for 2026–27 ==
Departing were Old Emanuel, Cranleigh and London Media all promoted to Counties 3 Surrey whilst London French (9th) were relegated to Counties 5 Surrey.

During the off season Old Freemans rebranded as Ashstead Frees.

Team	Ground	Capacity	City/Area	Previous season
Ashstead Frees	Ashtead Park		Ashtead, Surrey	4th
Economicals	LSE Sports Ground		New Malden, London	Promoted from Counties 5 Surrey (runners-up)
Old Glynonians	Glyn School		Epsom, Surrey	Relegated from Counties 3 Surrey (11th)
Old Paulines	Old Pauline Sports Ground		Thames Ditton, Surrey	Promoted from Counties 5 Surrey (champions)
Reigate	Colley Lane		Reigate, Surrey	7th
Staines	The Reeves		Feltham, London	5th
Warlingham	Limpsfield Road		Warlingham, Surrey	6th
Woking	Recreation Ground		Byfleet, Woking, Surrey	8th

Locations of the 2026–27 Counties 4 Surrey teams in Surrey and London

== Teams for 2025–26 ==
Departing were Haslemere, Old Glynonians and Southwark all promoted to Counties 3 Surrey whilst Old Paulines (10th) were relegated to Counties 5 Surrey. Also leaving were Harlequin Amateurs (5th) who did not return, instead starting the new season in Counties 5 Surrey.

Team	Ground	Capacity	City/Area	Previous season
Cranleigh	Wildwood Lane		Cranleigh, Surrey	6th
London French	Barn Elms		Barnes, London	9th
London Media	Battersea Park		Battersea, London	Relegated from Counties 3 Surrey (10th)
Old Emanuel	Raynes Park Sports Ground		Raynes Park, London	4th
Old Freemens	Ashtead Park		Ashtead, Surrey	8th
Reigate	Colley Lane		Reigate, Surrey	7th
Staines	The Reeves		Feltham, London	Promoted from Counties 5 Surrey (champions)
Warlingham	Limpsfield Road		Warlingham, Surrey	Relegated from Counties 3 Surrey (11th)
Woking	Recreation Ground		Byfleet, Woking, Surrey	Promoted from Counties 5 Surrey (runners-up)

Locations of the 2025-26 Counties 4 Surrey teams in Greater London
Locations of the 2025-26 Counties 4 Surrey teams in Surrey

== Teams for 2024–25 ==
Departing were Old Hamptonians and Streatham-Croydon both promoted to Counties 3 Surrey whilst Staines and Guildfordians were relegated to Counties 5 Surrey. In their place came London French and Reigate, promoted from Counties 5 Surrey with Old Emanuel relegated from Counties 3 Surrey. Also joining were Old Freemans who elected to suffer a double relegation from Counties 2 Surrey.

Team	Ground	Capacity	City/Area	Previous season
Cranleigh	Wildwood Lane		Cranleigh, Surrey	4th
Harlequin Amateurs	Bushy Park		Hampton Wick, London	7th
Haslemere	Woolmer Hill Sports Association		Haslemere, Surrey	6th
London French	Barn Elms		Barnes, London	Promoted from Counties 5 Surrey (runners-up)
Old Emanuel	Raynes Park Sports Ground		Raynes Park, London	Relegated from Counties 3 Surrey (10th)
Old Freemens	Ashtead Park		Ashtead, Surrey	Relegated from Counties 2 Surrey (12th)
Old Glynonians	Glyn School		Epsom, Surrey	8th
Old Paulines	Old Pauline Sports Ground		Thames Ditton, Surrey	5th
Reigate	Colley Lane		Reigate, Surrey	Promoted from Counties 5 Surrey (champions)
Southwark Lancers	Burgess Park		Camberwell, London	3rd

Locations of the 2024-25 Counties 4 Surrey teams in Greater London
Locations of the 2024-25 Counties 4 Surrey teams in Surrey

== Teams for 2023–24 ==
Departing the league were Bec Old Boys and Old Georgians, promoted to Counties 3 Surrey whilst Croydon were relegated to Counties 5 Surrey. Old Suttonians who finished bottom (9th) 23 but declined to return in Counties 5 Surrey instead withdrawing from league rugby to return to the merit leagues.

Joining were Cranleigh, relegated from Counties 3 Surrey, Haselmere and Old Hamptonians, both promoted from Counties 5 Surrey together with Southwark Lancers who came on a level transfer from the Kent Rugby leagues. Re-entering on a level transfer from the Middlesex leagues were Staines who had most recently competed in Herts/Middlesex 2 in 2021-22.

With four leaving and five joining the league was made up of 10 sides having had 9 in its inaugural year.

Team	Ground	Capacity	City/Area	Previous season
Cranleigh	Wildwood Lane		Cranleigh, Surrey	Relegated from Counties 3 Surrey (9th)
Guildfordians	Guildford Spectrum Leisure Complex		Guildford, Surrey	7th
Haslemere	Woolmer Hill Sports Association		Haslemere, Surrey	Promoted from Counties 5 Surrey (runners-up)
Harlequin Amateurs	Bushy Park		Hampton Wick, London	4th
Old Glynonians	Glyn School		Epsom, Surrey	5th
Old Hamptonians	Dean Road		Hampton, London	Promoted from Counties 5 Surrey (champions)
Old Paulines	Old Pauline Sports Ground		Thames Ditton, Surrey	3rd
Southwark Lancers	Burgess Park		Camberwell, London	Level transfer / relegated from Counties 2 Kent (12th)
Staines	The Reeves		Feltham, London	Re-entry
Streatham-Croydon	Frant Road	2,000 (200 seats)	Thornton Heath, London	6th

Locations of the 2023-24 Counties 4 Surrey teams in Greater London
Locations of the 2023-24 Counties 4 Surrey teams in Surrey

== Teams for 2022–23 ==
This was the first season following the RFU Adult Competition Review. The league was substantially similar to Surrey 3 but while that league had been at level 11 of the English rugby pyramid the new league was at level 10.

Six of the teams had previously competed in Surrey 3 and they were joined from the top two from Surrey 4 - Old Paulines and Streatham-Croydon. Also joining were Old Georgians who elected to drop two leagues from L3SW at level 8 for the new season.

Team	Ground	Capacity	City/Area	Previous season
Bec Old Boys	Ashcroft Technology Academy		Earlsfield, London	3rd Surrey 3
Croydon	Addington Road		Addington, London	8th Surrey 3
Guildfordians	Guildford Spectrum Leisure Complex		Guildford, Surrey	4th Surrey 3
Harlequin Amateurs	Bushy Park		Hampton Wick, London	3rd Surrey 4
Old Georgians	St George's College		Addlestone, Surrey	Relegated from L3SW (6th)
Old Glynonians	Glyn School		Epsom, Surrey	7th Surrey 3
Old Paulines	Old Pauline Sports Ground		Thames Ditton, Surrey	Runners-up Surrey 4
Old Suttonians	Walch Memorial Ground		Cheam, London	5th Surrey 3
Streatham-Croydon	Frant Road	2,000 (200 seats)	Thornton Heath, London	Champions Surrey 4

Locations of the 2022-23 Counties 4 Surrey teams in Greater London
Locations of the 2022-23 Counties 4 Surrey teams in Surrey

== Teams for 2021–22 ==
The teams competing in 2021–22 achieved their places in the league based on performances in 2019-20, the 'previous season' column in the table below refers to that season.

Team	Ground	Capacity	City/Area	Previous season
Harlequin Amateurs	Bushy Park		Hampton Wick, London	New entry
Haslemere	Woolmer Hill Sports Association		Haslemere, Surrey	5th
Mitcham & Carshalton	Peterborough Road		Carshalton, London	New entry
Old Hamptonians	Dean Road		Hampton, London	3rd
Old Paulines	Old Pauline Sports Ground		Thames Ditton, Surrey	Relegated from Surrey 3 (10th)
Reigate & Horley	Colley Lane		Reigate, Surrey	4th
Streatham-Croydon	Frant Road	2,000 (200 seats)	Thornton Heath, London	Relegated from Surrey 3 (9th)
University of Surrey	Surrey Sports Park		Guildford, Surrey	New Entry
Wandsworthians	Old Wimbledonians & Donhead Sports Ground		Raynes Park, London	6th
Woking	Recreation Ground		Byfleet, Woking, Surrey	7th

Locations of the 2021-22 Surrey 4 teams in Greater London
Locations of the 2021-22 Surrey 4 teams in Surrey

== Season 2020–21 ==
On 30 October the RFU announced that a decision had been taken to cancel Adult Competitive Leagues (National League 1 and below) for the 2020–21 season meaning Surrey 4 was not contested.

== Teams for 2019–20 ==
Team	Ground	Capacity	City/Area	Previous season
Croydon	Addington Road		Addington, London	3rd
Haslemere	Woolmer Hill Sports Association		Haslemere, Surrey	8th
Old Hamptonians	Dean Road		Hampton, London	New entry
Raynes Park	Raynes Park Recreation Ground		Raynes Park, London	4th
Reigate & Horley (Note: In June 2019 Reigate RFC senior section 'absorbed' Horley RFC seniors and stated an intention to compete as Reigate & Horley in season 2019-20.)	Colley Lane		Reigate, Surrey	6th
Wandsworthians	Old Wimbledonians & Donhead Sports Ground		Raynes Park, London	5th
Woking	Recreation Ground		Byfleet, Woking, Surrey	Relegated from Surrey 3 (9th)

Locations of the 2019-20 Surrey 4 teams in Greater London
Locations of the 2019-20 Surrey 4 teams in Surrey

== Teams for 2018–19 ==
Team	Ground	Capacity	City/Area	Previous season
Croydon	Addington Road		Addington, London	Relegated from Surrey 3 (10th)
Egham Hollowegians	Keith Heal Academy of Rugby		Englefield Green, Surrey	3rd
Haslemere	Woolmer Hill Sports Association		Haslemere, Surrey	9th
Horley	New Defence Sports Club		Horley, Surrey	Relegated from Surrey 3 (7th)
Old Suttonians	Walch Memorial Ground		Cheam, London	5th
Raynes Park	Raynes Park Recreation Ground		Raynes Park, London	4th
Reigate	Colley Lane		Reigate, Surrey	6th
Wandsworthians	Old Wimbledonians & Donhead Sports Ground		Raynes Park, London	8th

Locations of the 2018-19 Surrey 4 teams in Greater London
Locations of the 2018-19 Surrey 4 teams in Surrey

== Teams for 2017–18 ==
Team	Ground	Capacity	City/Area	Previous season
Egham Hollowegians	Keith Heal Academy of Rugby		Englefield Green, Surrey	3rd
Haslemere	Woolmer Hill Sports Association		Haslemere, Surrey	9th
Guildfordians	Guildford Spectrum Leisure Complex		Guildford, Surrey	Relegated from Surrey 3 (9th)
Mitcham & Carshalton	Poulter Park		Carshalton, London	6th
Old Suttonians	Walch Memorial Ground		Cheam, London	4th
Raynes Park	Raynes Park Recreation Ground		Raynes Park, London	7th
Reigate	Colley Lane		Reigate, Surrey	Relegated from Surrey 3 (10th)
Wandsworthians	Old Wimbledonians & Donhead Sports Ground		Raynes Park, London	8th
Woking	Recreation Ground		Byfleet, Woking, Surrey	5th

Locations of the 2017-18 Surrey 4 teams in Greater London
Locations of the 2017-18 Surrey 4 teams in Surrey

== Teams for 2016–17 ==
- Egham Hollowegians
- Haslemere
- Horley
- Mitcham & Carshalton (relegated from Surrey 3)
- Old Glynonians (relegated from Surrey 3)
- Old Oundelians
- Old Suttonians
- Raynes Park
- Wandsworthians
- Woking

== Teams for 2015–16 ==
- Egham Hollowegians
- Haslemere
- Horley
- Old Haileyburians
- Old Johnians
- Old Oundelians
- Old Suttonians
- Raynes Park
- Wandsworthians
- Woking

== Teams for 2014–15 ==
- Egham Hollowegians
- Haslemere
- Horley (transfer from Sussex)
- Old Haileyburians (relegated from Surrey 3)
- Old Oundelians
- Raynes Park (relegated from Surrey 3)
- Reeds Weybridge
- Reigate
- Wandsworthians
- Woking

== Teams for 2013–14 ==
- Egham Hollowegians
- Haslemere
- Merton
- Old Georgians
- Old Oundelians
- Reeds Weybridge
- Reigate
- Wandsworthians
- Woking

== Teams for 2012–13 ==
- Egham Hollowegians
- Haslemere
- Merton
- Metropolitan Police
- Old Glynonians
- Old Oundelians
- Reeds Weybridge
- Wandsworthians
- Woking

== Teams for 2011–12 ==
- Egham Hollowegians
- Guildfordians
- Lightwater
- Merton
- Metropolitan Police
- Old Glynonians
- Old Oundelians
- Reigate
- Wandsworthians
- Woking

== Teams for 2010–11 ==
- Egham Hollowegians
- Guildfordians
- Haslemere
- Lightwater
- Old Oundelians
- Reigate
- Streatham & Croydon
- Wandsworthians
- Woking

== Teams for 2009–10 ==
- London Economicals
- Egham Hollowegians
- Guildfordians RFC
- Old Glynonians
- Lightwater RFC
- Reigate
- Wandsworthians
- Woking

== Surrey Reserve League 1st XV's ==
Below Surrey 4 there is the Surrey Reserve Leagues this is for Surrey teams 2XV's and below, there are some 1XVs playing here.

- Old Johnians
- Racal Decca
- Esher Amateurs
- Old Suttonians
- Lightwater
- South Godstone Stags

== Original teams ==
When this division was introduced in 1988 it contained the following teams:

- British Aerospace
- Economicals
- Lightwater
- Oxted
- Racal-Decca
- Royal Holloway College
- University of Surrey

== Surrey 4 honours ==
=== Surrey 4 (1988–1993) ===
The original Surrey 4 was tier 11 league with promotion to Surrey 3 and relegation to Surrey 5, until that division was cancelled at the end of the 1991–92 season.

Surrey 4
Season	No of teams	Champions	Runners–up	Relegated teams
1988–89	7	University of Surrey (Note: Restructuring of the Surrey leagues due to the introduction of Surrey 5 for the following season meant that champions University of Surrey were not promoted.)	Royal Holloway College	Multiple teams (Note: The introduction of Surrey 5 for the following season meant that four clubs were relegated including Lightwater, Racal-Decca, Economicals and Oxted. Bottom side British Aerospace would ultimately drop out of the league system.)
1989–90	11	Old Bevonians	Reigate & Redhill	Shene Old Grammarians, Old Epsomians
1990–91	11	London Fire Brigade	BBC	University of Surrey, Racal-Decca, Gibraltar Engineers (Note: Gibraltar Engineers would drop out of the league.)
1991–92	10	Old Caterhamians	King's College Hospital (Note: The restructuring of the Surrey leagues caused by the cancellation of Surrey 5 at the end of the season meant that seven clubs were promoted including Chipstead, Shene Old Grammarians, Old Suttonians, Royal Holloway College and Woking.)	No relegation (Note: The cancellation of Surrey 5 at the end of the season meant there was no relegation.)
1992–93	11	Haslemere	Lightwater (Note: 3rd place London Media were also promoted.)	No relegation
Green backgrounds are promotion places.

=== Surrey 4 (1993–1996) ===
The creation of National 5 South meant that Surrey 4 dropped from a tier 11 league to a tier 12 league for the years that National 5 South was active. Promotion was to Surrey 3 and there was no relegation as Surrey 4 was at the lowest level of the league structure.

Surrey 4
Season	No of teams	Champions	Runners–up	Relegated teams
1993–94	8	Egham	Old Johnians	No relegation
1994–95	10	Kew Occasionals	Old Wellingtonians	No relegation
1995–96	11	King's College Hospital	Worth Old Boys	No relegation
Green backgrounds are promotion places.

=== Surrey 4 (1996–2000) ===
The cancellation of National 5 South at the end of the 1995–96 season meant that Surrey 4 reverted to being a tier 11 league. Promotion continued to Surrey 3 and there was no relegation. Surrey 4 was cancelled at the end of the 1999–00 season, with the majority of teams transferring to Surrey 3 or dropping out of the league system.

Surrey 4
Season	No of teams	Champions	Runners–up	Relegated teams
1996–97	8	Haslemere	Old Johnians	No relegation
1997–98	6	University of Surrey	St George's Hospital (Note: Runners up St George's Hospital would later drop out of the league system.)	No relegation
1998–99	3	Old Bevonians	Old Johnians	No relegation
1999–00	5	Old Abingdonians	Economicals (Note: Due to the low number of teams Surrey 4 would be cancelled until the 2005-06 season. Old Abingdonian and Economicals would be promoted to Surrey 3, Kings Cross Steelers would transfer to East Counties 3 South while the remaining teams would drop out of the league altogether.)	No relegation
Green backgrounds are promotion places.

=== Surrey 4 (2005–2009) ===
Surrey 4 was reintroduced as a tier 12 league for the 2005–06 season. Promotion was to Surrey 3 and, as the division was at the lowest level of the English league system, there was no relegation.

Surrey 4
Season	No of teams	Champions	Runners–up	Relegated teams
2005–06	10	Pelhamians	Teddington 2nd XV (Note: London Media were also promoted along with champions Pelhamians and runners up Teddington 2nd XV.)	No relegation
2006–07	9	Merton	Woking	No relegation
2007–08	7	Old Oundelians	Haslemere	No relegation
2008–09	10	CL London	Old Radleian	No relegation
Green backgrounds are promotion places.

=== Surrey 4 (2009–present) ===
Surrey 4 remained a tier 12 league despite national restructuring by the RFU. Promotion continued to Surrey 3 and there was no relegation.

Surrey 4
Season	No of teams	Champions	Runners–up	Relegated teams
2009–10	8	Old Glynonians	Economicals	No relegation
2010–11	9	Streatham-Croydon	Haslemere	No relegation
2011–12	10	Guildfordians	Reigate	No relegation
2012–13	9	Old Glynonians	Metropolitan Police	No relegation
2013–14	9	Old Georgians	Merton	No relegation
2014–15	10	Reeds Weybridge	Reigate	No relegation
2015–16	10	Old Haileyburians	Old Johnians	No relegation
2016–17	9	Horley	Old Glynonians	No relegation
2017–18	9	Woking	Guildfordians	No relegation
2018–19	8 (Note: Reduced from 9 to 8 teams after Mitcham & Carshalton dropped out of the league.)	Old Suttonians	Egham Hollowegians	No relegation
2019–20	7	Croydon	Raynes Park	No relegation
2020–21	Cancelled due to the COVID-19 pandemic in the United Kingdom.			
2021–22	9	Streatham-Croydon	Old Pauline	No relegation
Green backgrounds are promotion places.

== Number of league titles ==
- Haslemere (2)
- Old Bevonians (2)
- Old Glynonians (2)
- Streatham-Croydon (2)
- University of Surrey (2)
- CL London (1)
- Croydon (1)
- Egham (1)
- Guildfordians (1)
- Horley (1)
- Kew Occasionals (1)
- King's College Hospital (1)
- London Fire Brigade (1)
- Merton (1)
- Old Abingdonians (1)
- Old Caterhamians (1)
- Old Georgians (1)
- Old Haileyburians (1)
- Old Oundelians (1)
- Old Suttonians (1)
- Pelhamians (1)
- Reeds Weybridge (1)
- Woking (1)

== See also ==
- London & SE Division RFU
- Surrey RFU
- English rugby union system
- Rugby union in England
