= London Cornish RFC =

(England) London Cornish
- Full name: London Cornish Rugby Football Club
- Union: Cornwall RFU, Middlesex RFU
- Founded: 1962; 64 years ago^{1}
- Location: Roehampton Vale, Wandsworth, London, England
- Ground(s): Richardson Evans Memorial Playing Fields, Putney Heath
- CEO: Dickon Moon
- President: Tony Lander
- Coach: Paul Spivey
- Captain: Findlay Tweedie
- League: Counties 1 Surrey/Sussex
- 2024-25: 7th

Official website
- www.pitchero.com/clubs/londoncornishrfc/

London Cornish RFC is a rugby union club which was originally formed for Cornish expats in London. It was established in 1962 by a group who met in Fleet Street's Cock Tavern, and were originally known as the ″Cornish Exiles″.

The club changed its name to ″London Cornish″ shortly thereafter and played occasional fixtures in a variety of locations until moving to the current ground, the Richardson Evans Memorial Playing Fields just off the A3 and the current venue for the Rosslyn Park 7s. These grounds have been rented to the club ever since by Wimbledon and Putney Common Conservators. The club moved their once a week training venue to Rosslyn Park FC's all weather surface at the start of the 2016–17 season, and their post match venue to the Roehampton CC Clubhouse at the same time. With no direct and sustainable sources of income, the club relies upon sponsorship and fundraising to survive.

The advent of the league system saw London Cornish join the Middlesex leagues and there they stayed until the season of 1997–98 when the club transferred to Surrey 3. After one season in the new league, London Cornish saw improvements, achieving four promotions in seven years. A decade at level 7 followed, but following two play-off defeats when finishing 2nd in London 2 South West in 2014–15 and 2015–16, London Cornish registered the league's first ever 22 match unbeaten season in 2016-17 to be promoted to Level 6 for the first time. Cornish retained their place in Level 6 for 7 seasons, first in London 1 South, then Regional 2 Thames where the club reached its highest ever placing in the league structure of 6th place in 2022-23. Relegated from Regional 2 South East in 2023-24, Cornish finished 6th in the level 7 Counties 1 Surrey/Sussex in 2025–26 season and will compete there again in 2026-27. London Cornish run two teams competing in leagues and an occasional Vets side.

The current Director of Rugby Redruth born Dickon Moon, has been in the role since 2003, having joined the club from Old Patesians RFC, making him the longest serving Director of Rugby in the English game. Dickon was voted Middlesex RFU Volunteer of the Year in 2014, was awarded the Paul Smales Medallion for 'Services to Cornwall from a Cornishman living outside Cornwall' in 2015, the citation given for 'Outstanding service to Cornish rugby’ and in 2024 was made a Bard of the Cornish Gorsedh. From December 2021 he is supported by head coach Paul Spivey.

== Honours ==
- Surrey 3 champions (2): 1997–98, 2001–02
- Surrey 2 champions: 2003–04
- Hampshire 1 v Surrey 1 promotion play-off winner: 2004–05
- London 2 South West champions: 2016–17

== See also ==
- Rugby union in London
- London Irish
- London Scottish
- London Welsh
- Middlesex RFU
- Cornwall RFU
