= Croydon RFC =

(England) Croydon Wanderers RFC
- Full name: Croydon Wanderers Rugby Football Club
- Union: Surrey RFU
- Founded: 1956 as 'Shirley Wanderers RFC'
- Location: Croydon, London, England
- Ground: Addington Road
- Chairman: (England) Peter Norton
- President: (England) Ian Golding
- Captain: 1st XV (England) Adam Doe
- League: Kent Metropolitan A
- 2019–20: Champions (promoted to Surrey 3)

Official website
- www.croydonrfc.com

Croydon Rugby Football Club, founded in 1956 as Shirley Wanderers RFC, and are based at Addington Road, West Wickham, in the London Borough of Bromley, south London. Croydon are currently playing in the Rugby Football Union Kent Metropolitan A league. They also compete in the local Surrey RFU Knockout Competitions. Croydon currently fields a senior side, a growing Tinies (3-7yrs) Rhinos (8-10yrs) groups, a junior boys section (Under 16) and also a 'walking rugby' team.

== Club history ==
Formed as Shirley Wanderers RFC in 1956, by a mixture of experienced players and those who were new to the game. After 7 years as a wandering side, the club opened a clubhouse on the present site and leased 3 pitches, of which 2 remain. In 2003, Shirley Wanderers welcomed the players of Old Croydonian RFC after the club lost its supply of youth players, and then had to rely on players relocating to the area for employment and from non-playing rugby schools, and therefore started having trouble fielding a side, leading to the renaming of the club as Croydon RFC.

== Club Honours ==
- Surrey 2 champions (2): 2004–05, 2005–06
- Surrey 4 champions: 2019–20
