= Bishop's Move =

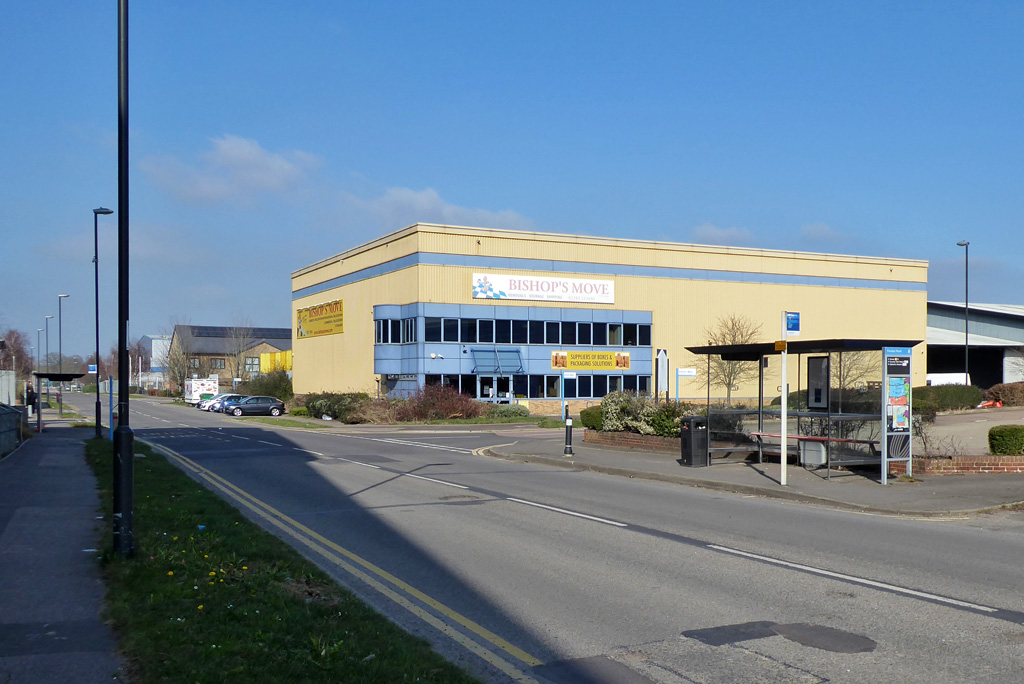
Bishop's Move, Faraday Road, Crawley

AGM Bishops Ltd, trading as Bishop's Move, is a UK-based removals, storage and international shipping company. Founded in 1854 by Joseph James Bishop, the business was built by generations of the Bishop family and has a member of the sixth generation still working within the company today. While Bishop's Move is no longer family-run, it has been part of the AGM Group since 2020 and continues to build on its long-standing heritage. Bishop's Move operates over 20 branches across the UK and Europe, including in Spain and Gibraltar.

== History ==
Joseph James Bishop, originally a farm worker from Norfolk, moved to London and briefly joined the police force under Robert Peel. He later opened a greengrocer on Elizabeth Street, London, and expanded into general cartage and haulage services. Bishop gradually developed the business to include moving and storing household furniture and effects, operating from Pimlico, SW1.

JJ maintained a farm in Morden to grow feed and rest horses used for transportation, and purchased premises on Hugh Street off Belgrave Road, SW1, taking advantage of the nearby Victoria Station. Horses were used in the company's operations until the 1930s, when motor vehicles were introduced.

The company, which is now over 170 years old, continued operating through both World Wars, providing removal services for government departments and relocating museum collections. The name “Bishop's Move” was officially registered in 1955.

== Notable moves ==
- Most recently, Bishop's Move was seen moving Keir Starmer from Downing Street in July 2026.
- In July 2024, Bishop's Move assisted outgoing Prime Minister Rishi Sunak in removing his belongings from 10 Downing Street.
- In October 2022, Bishop's Move assisted UK Prime Minister Rishi Sunak and his family in moving into the flat above 10 Downing Street, six months after previously vacating it during his tenure as Chancellor.
- In February 2020, Bishop's Move was seen moving ex-Chancellor, Sajid Javid, out of Number 10.
- In July 2019, Bishop's Move moved Boris Johnson and Carrie into Downing Street.
- In July 2016, Bishop's Move was entrusted with relocating Theresa May and her husband to Downing Street.
- In January 2013, Bishop's Move relocated the then Archbishop of Canterbury, Justin Welby, from Durham to Lambeth Palace.
