= Motspur Park =

Coordinates: 51.39°N 0.24°W

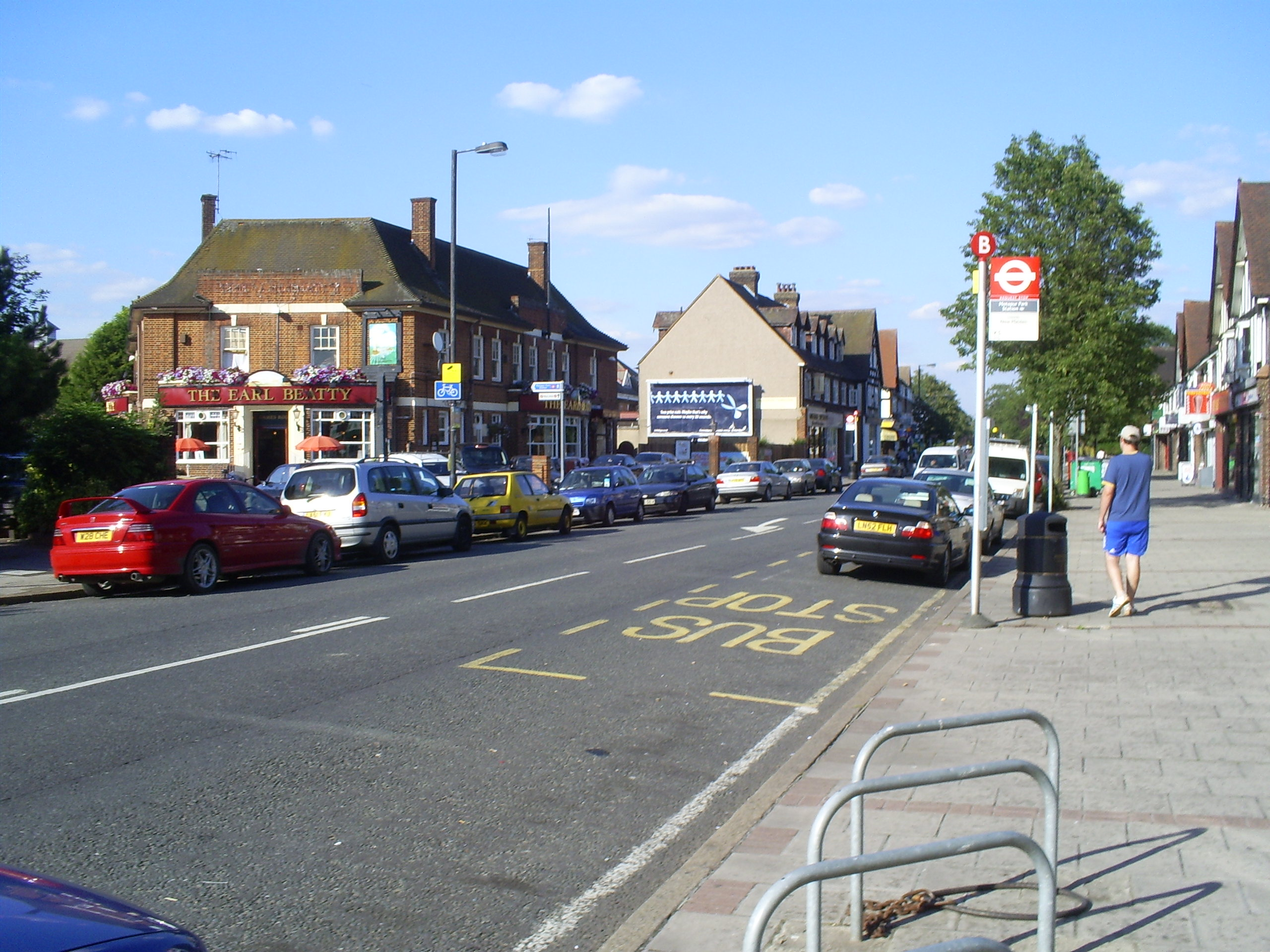
- The suburban shopping parade at Motspur Park dates from the 1930s

- Location within Greater London
- Population: 9,862 (2011 Census. West Barnes Ward)
- OS grid reference: TQ223674
- London borough: Merton; Kingston
- Ceremonial county: Greater London
- Region: London
- Country: England
- Sovereign state: United Kingdom
- Post town: NEW MALDEN
- Postcode district: KT3
- Dialling code: 020
- Police: Metropolitan
- Fire: London
- Ambulance: London
- UK Parliament: Kingston and Surbiton; Wimbledon
- London Assembly: Merton and Wandsworth; South West

Motspur Park, also known locally as West Barnes, is a residential suburb in south-west London, in the New Malden (Kingston) and Raynes Park (Merton) districts. It straddles the boroughs of Kingston upon Thames and Merton.

Motspur Park owes its identity to the railway station of the same name, opened in 1925, which has train services to London Waterloo, and to the adjacent parade of small shops. Three prominent gas holders, which were used to store the consumer gas supply for south-west London, stand just south of the shopping parade and can be seen from a wide area.

Two of London's minor natural watercourses flow through Motspur Park: Beverley Brook runs south to north through the centre and its tributary the Pyl Brook runs parallel to the east in shallow depressions in the land.

The Motspur Park athletics stadium was built by the University of London in 1928 and achieved fame when the world mile record was set there in 1938. It was sold to Fulham Football Club as their training ground in 1999.

== Name ==
The Mot family owned land in this area in the 14th century and gave their name to a farm that lay west of the Beverley Brook. In 1627, the farm was called Motes Firs, with 'Firs' being a reference to the furze or gorse that grew nearby. It had changed to Motts Spur Farm by 1823. The 1865 OS map uses a contemporary variant, Mosper.

The modern name comes from the same farm which by the twentieth century was marked as Motspur Farm. This lay between the later constructed roads of Motspur Park and Chilmark Gardens.

"Park" was an appendage added in the late nineteenth century, to mirror Worcester Park, Raynes Park and Stoneleigh Park, forming a contiguous belt of "Park" districts. Market gardening in intensive cultivation systems was the main form of agriculture of local land in these areas at the time and this intense cultivation was sometimes called a park. But the "Park" addition was deliberately promoted to suggest the area was a conversion from a landscaped garden or a wider inclosure. The word 'park' was further adopted by local government, railway operators, and house builders in promotional literature to attract capital-rich or high income residents into these new outer commuter suburbs.

== History ==
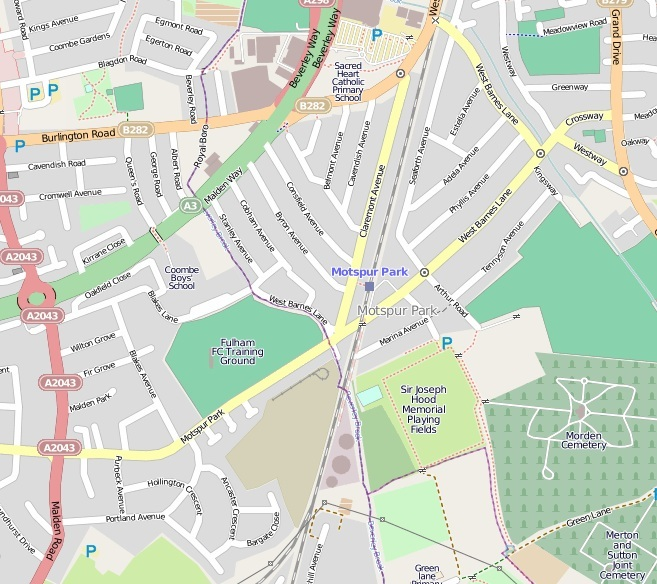
Motspur Park street map, 2012.

=== Rural origins ===
The district was historically known as West Barnes and formed part of the traditional county of Surrey. It was rural up to the end of the nineteenth century due to its lack of a railway station. Two roads hark back to this rural time, West Barnes Lane and Blakes Lane and are marked on the oldest maps. The barns referred to were those at the western end of Merton Abbey's estates and were located just north of West Barnes Lane's junction with the modern Crossway.

After the dissolution of the monasteries the abbey land was granted to the Gresham family, (descendants of Thomas Gresham) who were wealthy London merchants. They retained the estate for two generations, selling it in 1570 – a date questioned – or 1612 to John Carpenter, a local farmer. The area remained agricultural, with farms owned or farmed out to smaller tenant farmers by wealthy families. Senior owners were notably the Raynes family who gave their name to Raynes Park. In the nineteenth century two major landowners were Charles Blake of Blue House Farm (area of the modern Barnes End) and Richard Garth Lord of the manor of Morden. Both were lawyers and Garth eventually became a judge. They joined forces to agree to a bill for a railway line to Leatherhead and beyond to run across their land in order to receive valuable compensation and in a calculated long-term view to enhance future land value.

The railway's earthworks were planned and dug (largely laying a slight embankment, assisting with bridges over roads) and then laid through the locality in 1859 by the London and South Western Railway. The local station opened much later in 1925, the station name rapidly become the popular name of the district.

The 1871 map shows small farm workers cottages adjunct to farmhouses and a few mansions as the only dwellings of the area. The area east of the railway was part of Hobbald(e)s Farm owned by Garth. The mature oak woodland alongside it was planted around this time as screening from the railway; today it is a nature reserve.

The land was sold and eventually leased to J.J. Bishop (founder of the Bishops Move removal company) around 1873. In 1892 a tranche of land was sold to the Battersea Corporation for use as a cemetery; today known as Morden cemetery and the Northeast Surrey Crematorium.

=== Beginning of the suburban era ===
The area began to be developed as a proto-suburb before World War I and then fully in the Inter-War Period. First developments were streets off Burlington Road which had a tram route from about 1906: the northern ends of Belmont, Cavendish and Claremont Avenues in the west; and Seaforth, Estela and Adela Avenues in the east. Mostly these were well-serviced short terraces, typically six houses joined, each with three bedrooms and a bathroom upstairs and two living rooms and a kitchen downstairs. Motspur Park attracted its first of its characteristic playing fields at this time.

The country's first dual carriageway of the type purpose-built across green fields, the Kingston Bypass (A3), was opened in 1926. It became the de facto north-western boundary to the district. The large local junction at Shannon Corner, had a large, tall concrete Odeon cinema. The road brought speculative house building on open land from this point to Chessington, stimulating residential development on formerly agricultural land.

The principal developer who turned Motspur Park into a residential suburb between the world wars was Sidney Ernest Parkes, a boat manufacturer and constructional engineer. His company, Modern Homes and Estates Ltd, was founded in 1924 and was responsible for many of the streets. Some streets including Phyllis Avenue and Arthur Road, named after his children; Others like Byron Avenue, Tennyson Avenue and Marina Avenue after literary figures or royalty. Wates were also active builders in the area in the inter war years, building to the west of the railway line.

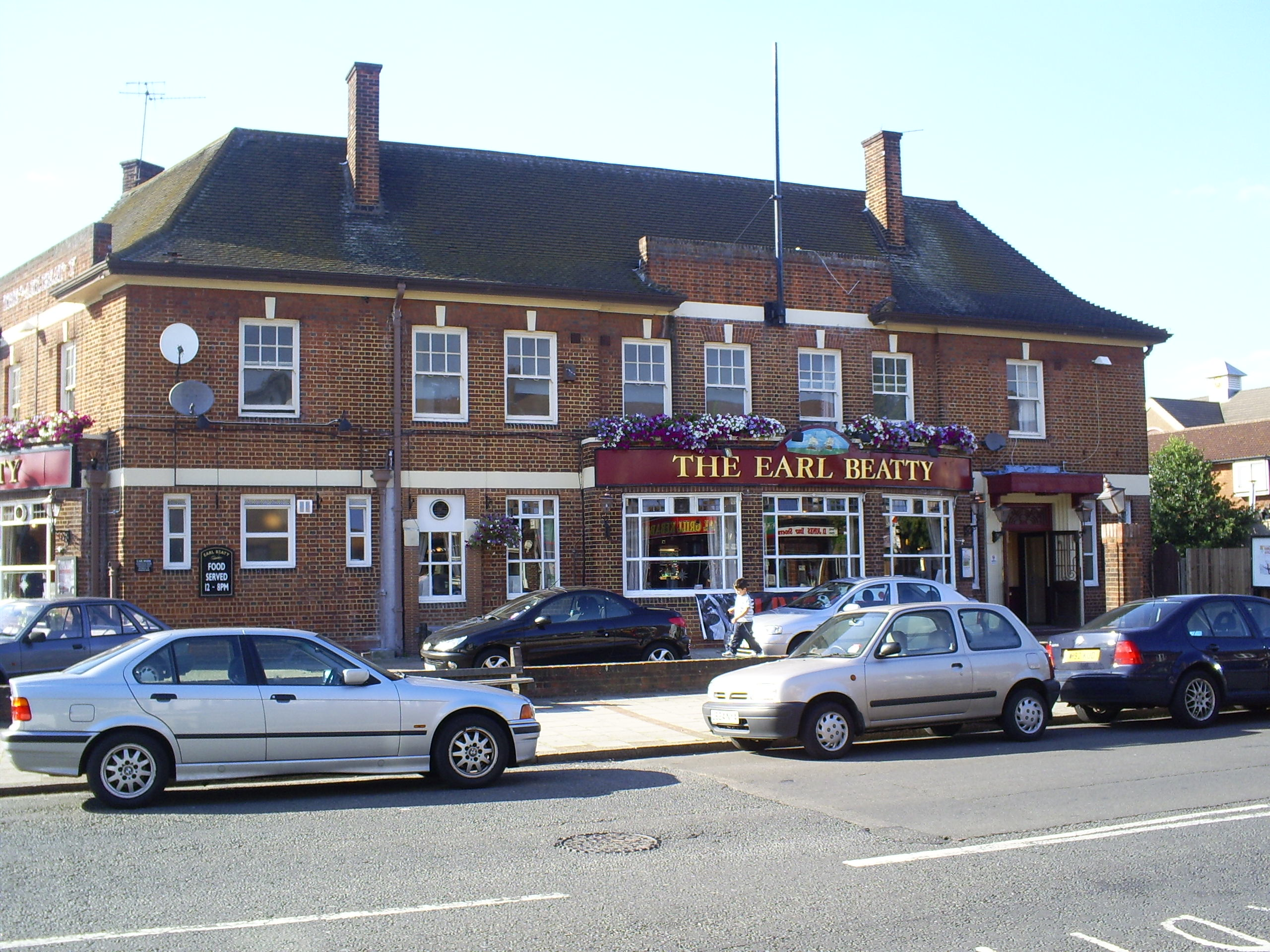
The Earl Beatty pub

The only local public house, The Earl Beatty, was built in 1938 and celebrates David Beatty, 1st Earl Beatty who commanded a large part of the British fleet at the Battle of Jutland in the First World War.

In 1931 part of Hobbald(e)s Farm was acquired by Merton and Morden Urban District to become the Sir Joseph Hood Memorial Playing Fields. One reason was to perpetuate the name of local benefactor and ex-Mayor of Wimbledon, Sir Joseph Hood. Facilities include a pavilion, football and cricket pitches, tennis courts, bowling green, putting green and children's play areas. Part of the area is now a managed local nature reserve.

The biggest local employer in the twentieth century was the Decca gramophone record company. In 1929 this was making up to 60,000 records a day at its factory in Burlington Road, New Malden. The company diversified during World War II to make radar and the Decca Navigator System. When the Odeon Cinema, adjacent to their factory, closed in 1960, Decca converted it to offices, which they used till about 1979.

The Shannon typewriter company manufactured at Shannon Corner to which it gave its name. Nearby were the Venner timeswitch company maker of Britain's first parking meters and Carter's Tested Seeds. Bradbury Wilkinson, a security printing company, designers and makers of banknotes for small country clients, is today the site of a Tesco supermarket.

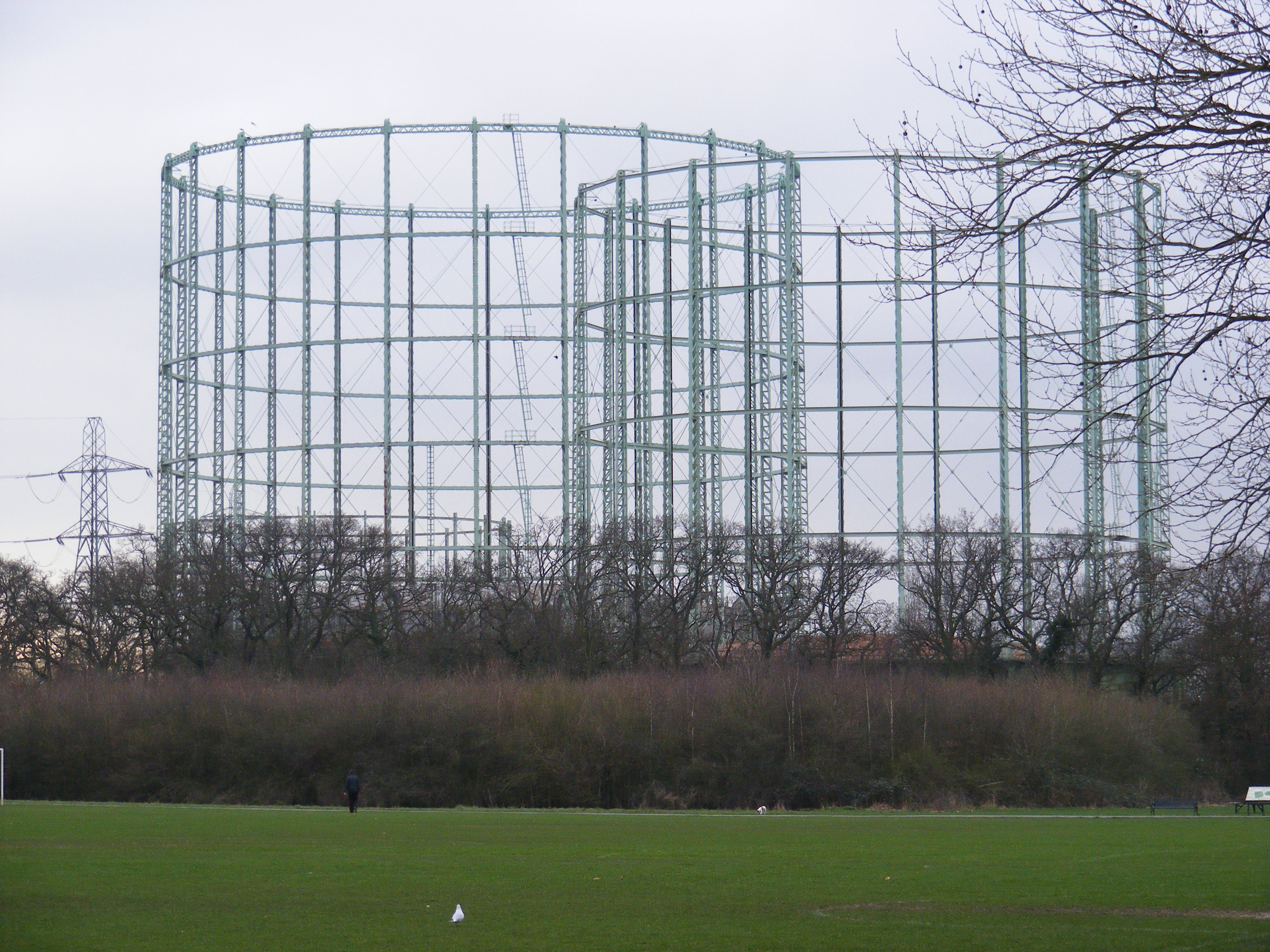
The large gasometers at Motspur Park are visible across most of SW London.

The Church of England built Holy Cross Church where the first service was held in 1908. Following its destruction during the Second World War a new building was erected on the site – the first church, replacement or new, completed after the war in the Diocese. Designed by architect Ralph Covell it was dedicated for worship in 1949. The church hall burned down in the 1980s and has since been rebuilt. Originally a mission church of St Saviour's Raynes Park, the parish of Motspur Park was created when the church grew large enough, taking some of the parish of St Saviour's Raynes Park and St James New Malden.

=== World War II ===
The University of London and BBC recreation club grounds were sites of anti-aircraft batteries. The BBC site was the home guard base. Around 30 high explosive bombs fell across the district between October 1940 and June 1941. A large community bomb shelter was built near the entrance to the Joseph Hood Playing Fields. In one incident a stick of bombs was aimed at the railway station by a German bomber but missed and destroyed houses in Marina Avenue (including the six from 63 to 73) and Claremont Avenue (166–168, and possibly 162–164, Claremont Avenue). The bomb landing in Claremont Avenue landed on a 21st birthday house party killing many. In other events a bailed-out German pilot landed on top of the gasometers but fell to his death.

On the morning of 3 July 1944, a V1 flying bomb came down close to 45 Motspur Park; seven houses were razed and no deaths reported. Several other houses close by were badly damaged. The bomb sites became "a playground" for young children in the area for a few years, pending rebuilding.

=== Post-war ===
Post-war affluence saw many houses extended, often with loft conversions and conservatories. By the 1980s most front gardens had been paved or gravelled for car parking, reflecting the rise in car ownership . The very few large Victorian houses have been mostly subdivided or demolished for new building.

An earlier small B&Q store-warehouse stood next to West Barnes Library on the site of the Victorian Ivy House, now replaced by Blossom House School. It then relocated to Burlington Retail Park, west of the area. It is now located on Shannon Corner, just east of the Burlington Retail Park and north west of the old site in West Barnes.

== Playing fields ==
Green belt planning restriction has allowed these fields to remain despite pressure from developers. The playing fields located within the Motspur Park area are:

- The King's College School Kingsway sports ground
- The Sir Joseph Hood Memorial Playing Fields, home of Motspur Park football club
- Dornan Fields, home of KCS Old Boys rugby club
- The Old Blues rugby club Dornan Fields, Arthur Road
- The Tenison's School playing field Arthur road (purchased in 1924)
- Plus one other minor ground

=== Former University of London athletics ground (now Fulham football club training ground) ===
The University of London Athletics ground was laid out in 1931, the University having spent £18,000 in 1926 to acquire what was then unspoilt countryside and almost as much again on levelling and drainage works to help establish Motspur Park as a top-class facility. The 28-acre site was opened by the university's chancellor, Lord Beauchamp William Lygon, 7th Earl Beauchamp. A pavilion and covered stand followed in 1932, and in May of that year the ground hosted the Inter-Universities sport event. It was allowed to be used as the venue for the annual ‘Laundry Sports’, staged for the capital's laundry workers during the 1930s.

The athletics track was graced by the likes of Sydney Wooderson, who set a world record for the mile on the track in 1937, and Roger Bannister winning the 1 Mile in the Inter-Hospitals Athletic Championships in 1952.

As an athletics track it served for scenes in films The Games (1970), Chariots of Fire (1981) and The Four Minute Mile (1988) (TV).

In 1996, the athletics track was grassed over. Three years later in 1999, the ground was sold to Fulham Football Club as the club's permanent training ground. It has since been extensively updated into a state-of-the-art sporting facility with over 150 members of staff.

=== Former BBC sports ground ===
The BBC Club had been introduced by John Reith, 1st Baron Reith General Manager & Director-General of the BBC in 1924 and expanded in 1929 with the development of a purpose built and extensive 21-acre sports ground at Motspur Park. By June 1930, 400 of the 600 Head Office staff were club members.

The clubhouse was built in 1929 as a colonial style pavilion complete with clock tower. The grounds were laid out with the help of Bert Lock, an English cricketer and prominent groundsman, included four football pitches, six tennis courts, one hockey pitch, one rugby pitch, two cricket squares, and a rifle range. The BBC moved from its original home at Savoy Hill off the Strand to purpose-built premises at Broadcasting House in Langham Place in 1932. The ground also hosted a Model Railway Club; a 5-inch live steam track used to run parallel to the railway line opposite to the location of the gas towers. It was later relocated behind tennis courts. The BBC would host annual summer events, and a bonfire and fireworks party in early November.

In 1948, the Cambridge university athlete John Mark (athlete) was chosen to carry the Olympic torch for the final leg of its journey into Wembley Stadium and light the flame in its specially designed bowl. He did his initial training for this event in strict secrecy at the BBC sports ground in Motspur Park.

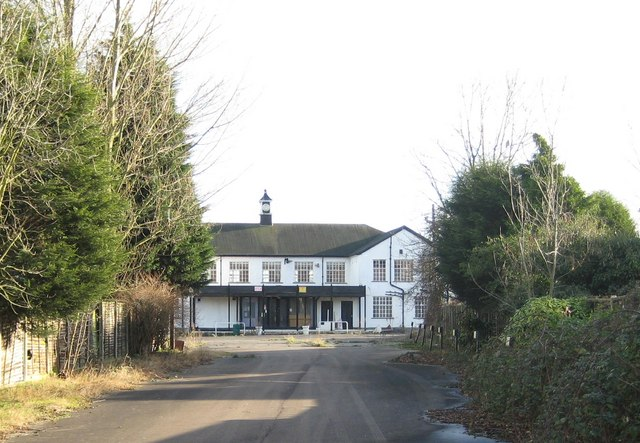
Motspur Park: Former BBC Sports Ground Clubhouse

In later days it occasionally featured in BBC comedy series such as Monty Python's Flying Circus (1969–1974) and The Two Ronnies (1971–1987).

The grounds and buildings were sold by the BBC in July 2000 to Hawkesbrook Leisure Group, who took a lease to run Motspur Park as a commercial venture, which included providing services to the BBC Club, but the company ran into financial difficulties. In July 2004, the club closed, with the loss of all facilities to club members. In 2005, it was purchased by Irishman Ben Dunne (entrepreneur) for £3 million. However, a series of planning disputes left it derelict for many years, until a devastating clubhouse fire in July 2016.

The extensive grounds were obtained by Fulham Football Club in 2018 as a satellite training ground.

== Sport ==
The area is home to a number of amateur sports clubs playing rugby union, football, cricket and Aussie Rules amongst others.

- KCS Old Boys RFC
- Old Amplefordians RFC
- Old Blues RFC
- Old Tenisonians FC
- Raynes Park Vale FC Youth
- Wimbledon Hawks (AFL)

== Politics ==
Motspur Park is part of the Wimbledon constituency for elections to the House of Commons of the United Kingdom.

Motspur Park is part of the Motspur Park and Old Malden East for elections to Kingston upon Thames London Borough Council. West Barnes is part of the West Barnes ward for elections to Merton London Borough Council.

== Notable residents ==
- Nigel Winterburn, football player.
- Caitlin Thomas, author and the widow of Welsh poet Dylan Thomas, lived for a while in Arthur Road during the 1970s.

== In popular culture ==
Motspur Park has been used as a setting in sketches for Brush Strokes, a BBC television comedy series about an amorous painter and decorator, which ran for five series between 1986 and 1991.

Douglas Adams has it that a "Motspur" (n.) is the fourth wheel of a supermarket trolley which looks identical to the other three but renders the trolley completely uncontrollable.

== Nearby places ==
- Kingston
- Old Malden
- Worcester Park
- North Cheam
- Morden
- Colliers Wood
- Merton Park
- Wimbledon
- New Malden
- Raynes Park

== Gallery ==
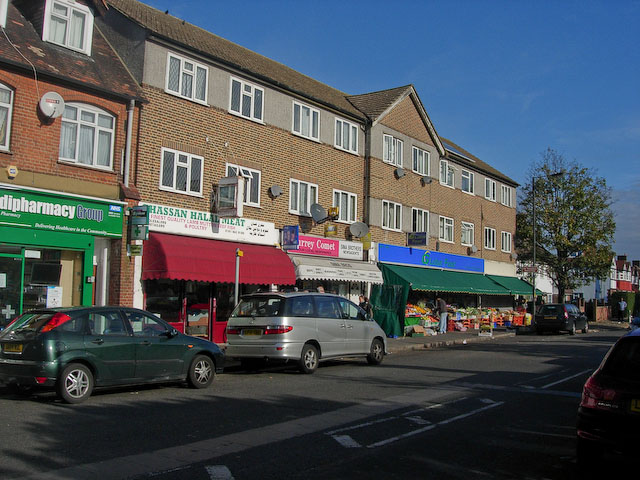
The post-war section of the shops added, completed in autumn 1958. Local residents referred to these as the "new shops".

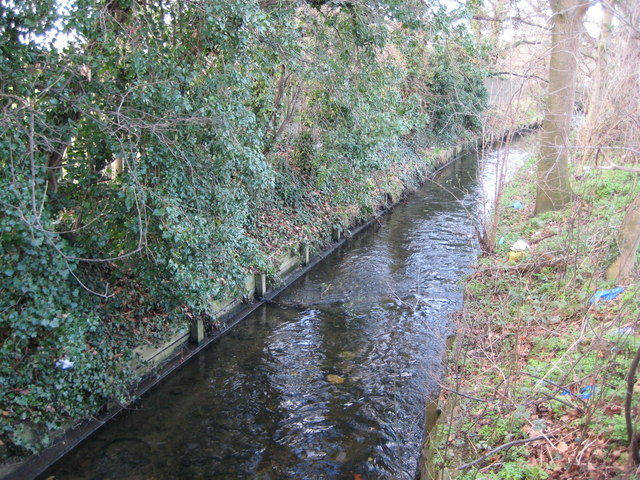
The Beverley Brook looking downstream from the Motspur Park/West Barnes Lane road bridge.

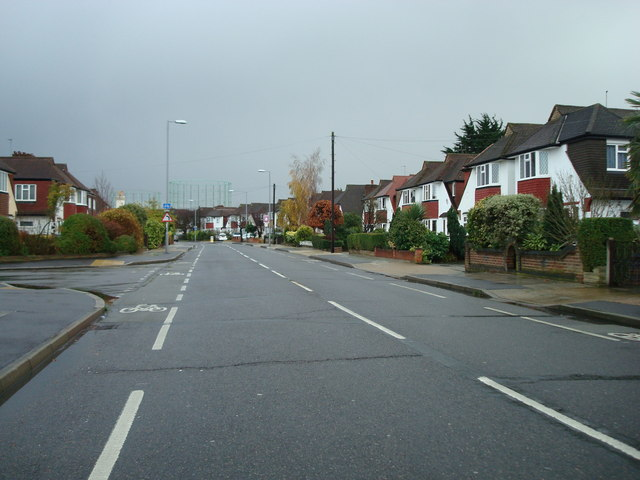
The 1930s suburban street known as Motspur Park and site of the original Mospur Farm. The houses on this side of the railway were built by Wates builders.

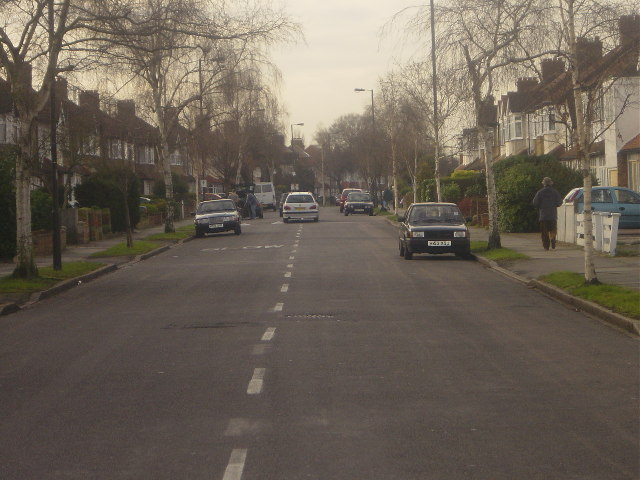
West Barnes Lane showing houses built in the 1930s by Modern Homes and Estates Ltd. A typical feature is the whitewashed pebble dashing.

== See also ==
- Motspur Park railway station

== Bibliography ==
- Jowett, Evelyn M. An Illustrated History of Merton and Morden Published Merton and Mordon Festival of Britain Local Committee (1951)
