= Harlequin Amateurs =

(England) Harlequin Amateurs
- Full name: Harlequin Amateurs Rugby Football Club
- Union: Middlesex RFU
- Nickname(s): Quins
- Founded: 2007 (1920 Lockside)
- Location: Bushy Park, London
- Chairman: (England) Myles Woodley
- President: (England) Bob Hiller
- Coach(es): (South Africa) Luke Povey
- Captain(s): (England) George Jaques
- League(s): Counties 4 Surrey
- 2024/25: 5th
Team kit

Official website
- www.harlequinrugby.co.uk

Harlequin Amateurs Rugby Football Club are a Hampton Wick-based English rugby union club who play their rugby in the RFU league system, currently in Counties 4 Surrey. They train and play in Bushy Park.

The club formed as a result of 2007 merger between the historic Lockside RFC, formerly Lensbury RFC and Harlequin Amateurs, a modern non-professional version of their namesake.

The club runs two Senior men's teams, a Vet's team and a mini and youth programme from Under 5s to Under 14s. In 2016/17, the club expanded to include a girl's youth team and in 2021/22 Harlequins Women 3XV joined the women's and girls set up to form an amateur pathway from Under 13s to a Senior Women's team.

== History ==
Harlequin Amateurs in their current guise were formed in the summer of 2007, following a friendly merger between Lockside RFC of Teddington and Harlequin Amateurs based in Roehampton. The new club is now based in Twickenham, Middlesex.

Lockside began life as Lensbury RFC (founded 1920), the rugby club being associated with Shell Oil's social club Lensbury. In 1998 Royal Dutch Shell decided that field sports and its social club were not compatible with each other, financial support for the rugby, football, hockey and cricket clubs was subsequently removed.

The rugby club rose from the ashes and was reborn as Lockside RFC. Homeless, and without a clubhouse, a relationship was formed with St Mary's University for playing pitches and along with the footballers of Weirside AFC (formerly Lensbury AFC) a slightly tired clubhouse was found overlooking the famous Teddington Lock, the club soon began to grow again.

However, across the river Harlequin Amateurs had been born, forming in approx 2000 as a result of the Harlequin FC going professional. The club started at the bottom and worked their way into Herts/Middlesex 1, where they regularly traded blows with Lockside! The club attracted players drawn by the allure of wearing one of the most iconic club rugby shirt in the world. Nonetheless, the club didn't progress as quickly as had been hoped and in 2006 began to struggle.

A mystery phone call in spring 2007 led to a less than by chance encounter in the King's Head, Teddington. Following an evening spent drinking, eating and discussing all things rugby, but particularly the two clubs, a plan was hatched for their mutual benefit and prosperity - the clubs agreed to merge.

The new club was officially formed on 1 August 2007, but retained it 87 years of Lensbury heritage and 140 years of Harlequins brand.

Quins previous experience in the RFU leagues was the 2012/13 in Herts/Middlesex 1. They could not fulfil their fixture commitments and subsequently resigned their place to join the Middlesex Merit league division 6 for the season 2013/14.

In Quins 150th year, the professional club aimed to bring together all branches of the club by allowing all teams to wear the anniversary kit from 1st XV down to minis, along with the Ladies team. In this 150th year, the 2016/17 season, the 1st XV competed in Herts/Middlesex 2, finishing in 7th position at the split in the league. In the second half of the season, an almost perfect end to the season, with the exception of a loss to Mill Hill, finished the season with plenty to look forward to for the 2017/18 season.

After a mid table finish in Herts/Middlesex 2 in the 2017/18 season, Quins ams decided to move into the merit tables once again for a rebuild with a 5-year playing plan. within the first year of this plan, the 1st XV were crowned champions of the Middlesex merit 3 table, while also securing an 18-game undefeated run in the league. The 2019/20 season wasn't a great one for Quins as injuries riddled the 1st XV meaning 2nd team members as well as vet's were brought in to the first team to front up and did so during the year. however it wasn't to be as Quins finished 9th.

With the 2020/21 Season eventually cancelled due to COVID-19, it was still a positive year for Quins. Harlequin Amateurs secured a home playing alongside Hampton Wick Royal Cricket Club, Located just over Kingston Bridge in Bushy Park.

== Club honours ==
- Herts/Middlesex 3 - League Champions 2002/03
- Herts/Middlesex 2 - League Champions 2004/05, 2007/08
- Middlesex Merit Vase - 2013/2014
- Middlesex Merit 3 - League Champions 2018/19
- Promotion to Surrey 3
- Papa Johns Community Cup Counties 3 Plate Champions 2022/3
