= Whiteley Village =

Retirement village in Hersham, Surrey, England

Coordinates: 51.35037°N 0.42747°W

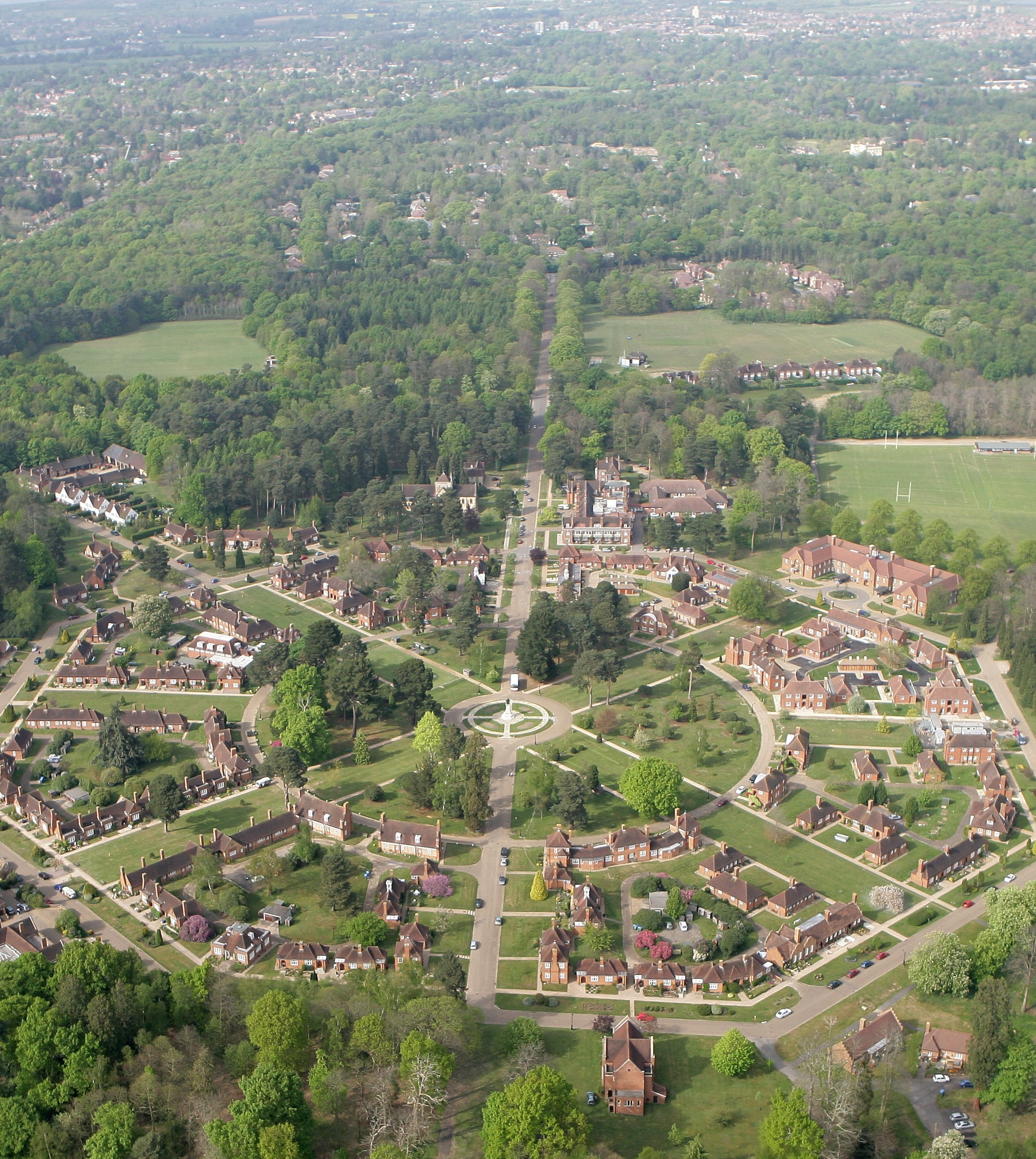
Aerial view showing the geometrical design of this purpose-built retirement village.

Whiteley Village, in Hersham, Surrey, England, is a retirement village, much of it designed architecturally by Arts and Crafts movement-influenced architect Reginald Blomfield. It is owned by the charitable Whiteley Homes Trust and is on land which was once part of Walton Firs and Walton Heath, before the parish of Hersham was created in the 19th century.

== History ==
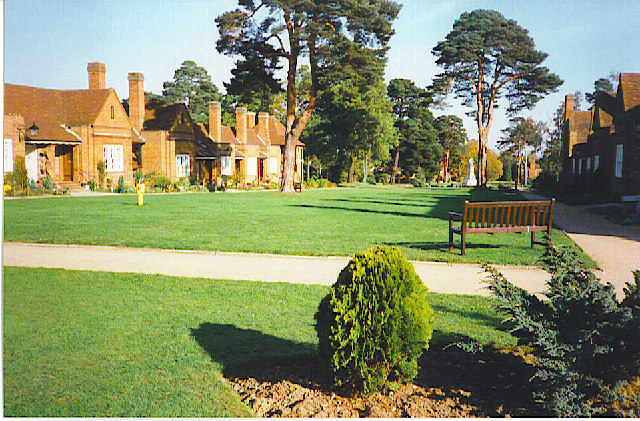
Properties within the village's urban design.

Whiteley Village formed as the result of a bequest of £1,000,000 realised in 1907 upon the death of William Whiteley (equivalent to approx. £120,000,000 in 2020). The village is owned and administered by The Whiteley Homes Trust, a charity registered in the UK, and provides over 250 almshouses for older people of limited financial means who are capable of independent living. In addition to the almshouses, the village also contains an extra-care facility (consisting of 51 self-contained flats with domiciliary care) and a new nursing and residential care home consisting of 30 care suites, completed in 2019.

The land on which the community sits is on the gravel-rich lower slopes of the much higher bank of the River Mole, Surrey, 10–15 metres above the level of the tributary. Its surrounding buffer land has remained the most wooded part of its two historic parishes, and until the 19th century was wholly part of Walton Firs and Walton Heath in Walton on Thames. Hersham is one of the most recently created chapelries and villages in Surrey, created in 1851 from the southern part of Walton-on Thames. It is, roughly, the part of the original parish south of the South West Main Line. Its first Church of England place of worship, a chapel of ease was built of yellow brick in Anglo-Norman style in 1839.

== Architecture ==
In addition to the care and housing provided, a major feature of Whiteley Village is that it consists of more than a hundred listed buildings, which together form an important collection of Arts and Crafts movement as it applies to a style of architecture. Much of the design work here was by architect Reginald Blomfield, though fellow notable architects helped with the designs including Sir Mervyn Edmund Macartney, Ernest Newton and Sir Aston Webb. This movement was particularly a main style in and around the neighbouring area to the west which is partly in the parish of Weybridge, Saint George's Hill where W.G. Tarrant was a major designer-builder and saw its early evolution in many Surrey examples of Lutyens' work. It remains a style occasionally used where building costs allow it to be implemented without forsaking its original decorative and traditional core principles.

== Amenities ==
Whiteley Village contains two churches, a museum, a village hall, shop and post office, launderette, charity store, library, therapy pool, licensed clubhouse, café, putting and bowls green, golf club. In addition to this the villagers run a variety of clubs and societies.

Whiteley Village is an example of a model village, which evolved in the UK over a short period of time, and has protected-status wooded areas and a golf course buffer zone land around it.

== See also ==
- Henry Lucas Charity

Media related to Whiteley Village at Wikimedia Commons
