= Ashcroft Technology Academy =

Coordinates: 51.456°N 0.208°W

Location
- 100 West Hill; London, SW15 2UT; United Kingdom

Information
- Type: Academy
- Established: 2007 (formerly ADT College, est. 1992)
- Trust: Prospect Education Trust
- Department for Education URN: 135316 Tables
- Ofsted: Reports
- Headmaster: Douglas Mitchell MA (Hons)
- Years offered: 7 to 13
- Gender: Mixed
- Age: 11 to 18
- Enrolment: 1120
- Colours: Blue, grey and white
- Sponsor: Lord Ashcroft
- Website: www.ashcroftacademy.org.uk

Ashcroft Technology Academy, formerly ADT College, is a state secondary school in south-west London, Putney. The school has been awarded with the Charter Mark, Investors in People and the School Achievement Award. As of September 2006, organisations involved with the school include Cisco Systems, Sport England and the Arts Council of England.

Ashcroft Technology Academy is a secondary school for students aged 11–16 (academic years 7–11). The school also offers further education for students aged 16–18 (academic years 12 and 13) in their Sixth Form. The academy has undergone a multi-million pound refurbishment programme which was completed in Summer 2010. This included a purpose-built sixth-form and an Autism Resource Centre.

The academy is named after its sponsor, Lord Ashcroft. It is a registered charity under the formal name Prospect Education (Technology) Trust Limited.

== History ==
ADT College was established in 1991 as a City Technology College, funded by donations from various organisations including ADT Security Services (whose owner at the time was Baron Michael Ashcroft), Unisys, British Gas and Young's (who sponsored the schools "music bunker"). In 2007, the school was converted into an academy and renamed Ashcroft Technology Academy after its main private benefactor. Preceding this period the Building was the site of Mayfield School, an all-girl's comprehensive.

== Results ==
GCSE results: percentage of students achieving 5 or more grades A*-C (and equivalent) including English and Mathematics

- 2008 – 68%
- 2009 – 70%
- 2010 – 79%
- 2011 – 71%
- 2012 – 68%
- 2013 – 67%
- 2014 – 65%
- 2016 – 80%+

A-Level results: average points score per student

- 2011 – 843
- 2012 – 860
- 2013 – 881
- 2014 – 874

== Admissions for Year 7 ==
The school is oversubscribed; in 2010 there were 1,390 applications for the 210 places available.

== The Sixth Form ==
Post-16 at Ashcroft provides students with a range of courses and teaching methods. The Sixth Form comprises Year 12 and 13 of around 150 students. Students need 7 A*-C in different subjects with a minimum of 4 B Grades at GCSE to progress onto Level 3 courses; however the International Baccalaureate students are required to have 8 A*-B Grades at GCSE.

== Ofsted Report ==
Ashcroft Technology Academy's Ofsted report, from 2015, gave a result of "Outstanding", the latest report in 2021 is still "Outstanding".

== Homework ==
The school issues weekly homework for each subject from years 7-11 using the Show My Homework platform. All issued homework can be found in the homework section on their website.

== Controversies ==
In 2011, the academy was criticised after it was revealed that teachers' contracts contained a clause forbidding them from taking industrial action, despite such a clause being legally unenforceable in the UK. This was in addition to union negotiation rights not being recognised by academy leaders or governors. As a result, teachers belonging to the National Union of Teachers did not take part in strikes in June 2011 due to disciplinary concerns. The contract was called "draconian" by the Times Educational Supplement.

The school attracted criticism in September 2021 when it was revealed that the school had implemented a policy prohibiting the bringing of bicycles on to the school site, and also included bicycles in a list of other prohibited items including weapons, drugs, and pornography.
