= Kent Plate =

UK rugby event

- Sport: Rugby Union
- Instituted: 1993; 33 years ago
- Number of teams: 4
- Country: England
- Holders: Westcombe Park (2nd title) (2017–18)
- Most titles: Beckenham, Tunbridge Wells (3 titles)
- Website: Kent RFU

The Kent Plate is an annual rugby union knock-out club competition organised by the Kent Rugby Football Union. It was first introduced during the 2001–02 season, with the inaugural winners being Bromley. It is the fourth most important rugby union cup competition in Kent, behind the Kent Cup, Kent Shield and Kent Vase, but ahead of the Kent Salver.

The Kent Plate is currently open to the first teams of club sides based in Kent that have been knocked out of the first round of the Kent Cup and Kent Shield. The format is a knockout cup with a first round, semi-finals and a final, typically to be held at a pre-determined ground at the end of April on the same date and venue as the Cup, Shield, Vase and Salver finals.

== Kent Plate winners ==
Kent Plate Finals
Season	Winner	Score	Runners–up	Venue
1993–94	Gravesend			
1994–95	Brockleians			
1995–96	Sidcup			
1996–97	Old Colfeians			
1997–98	Gravesend			
1998–99	Tunbridge Wells			
1999-00	Tunbridge Wells			
2000–01	Dartfordians			
2001–02	Canterbury			
2002–03	Sidcup			
2003–04	Thanet Wanderers			
2004–05	Aylesford Bulls			
2005–06	Beckenham	39–17	Old Dunstonian	
2006–07	Beckenham			
2007–08	Tunbridge Wells	37–7	Beckenham	Merton Lane, Canterbury, Kent
2008–09	Deal & Betteshanger			The Jack Williams Memorial Ground, Aylesford, Kent
2009–10	Beckenham	22–5	Canterbury	Foxbury Avenue, Chislehurst, London
2010–11	Thanet Wanderers	58–5	Tunbridge Wells	Merton Lane, Canterbury, Kent
2011–12	Tonbridge Juddians	26–18	Medway	Priestfields, Rochester, Kent
2012–13	Sevenoaks		Old Dunstonian	Canterbury Road, Ashford, Kent
2013–14	Westcombe Park		Medway	Footscray Road, New Eltham, London
2014–15	Charlton Park	52–16	Thanet Wanderers	Tomlin Ground, Cranbrook, Kent
2015–16	Maidstone	N/A (Note: Maidstone won the 2016 Plate final by default as Old Dunstonians could not raise a team.)	Old Dunstonians	The Jack Williams Memorial Ground, Aylesford, Kent
2016–17	Maidstone	58–14	Aylesford Bulls	Merton Lane, Canterbury, Kent
2017–18	Westcombe Park	65–0	Thanet Wanderers	Footscray Road, New Eltham, London
2018–19				

== Number of wins ==
- Beckenham (3)
- Tunbridge Wells (3)
- Gravesend (2)
- Maidstone (2)
- Sidcup (2)
- Thanet Wanderers (2)
- Westcombe Park (2)
- Aylesford Bulls (1)
- Brockleians (1)
- Canterbury (1)
- Charlton Park (1)
- Dartfordians (1)
- Deal & Betteshanger (1)
- Old Colfeians (1)
- Sevenoaks (1)
- Tonbridge Juddians (1)

== See also ==
- Kent RFU
- Kent Cup
- Kent Shield
- Kent Vase
- Kent Salver
- English rugby union system
- Rugby union in England
