= Kent Vase =

English rugby union competition

- Sport: Rugby Union
- Instituted: 2001; 25 years ago
- Number of teams: 21
- Country: England
- Holders: Sittingbourne (1st title) (2025-26)
- Most titles: Beccehamian (4 titles)
- Website: Kent RFU

The Kent Vase is an annual rugby union knock-out club competition organized by the Kent Rugby Football Union. It was first introduced during the 2001-02 season, with the inaugural winners being Bromley. It is the third most important rugby union cup competition in Kent, behind the Kent Cup and Kent Shield but ahead of the Kent Plate and Kent Salver.

The Kent Vase is open to the first teams of club sides based in Kent that play in tier 9 (Shepherd Neame Kent 1) and tier 10 (Shepherd Neame Kent 2) of the English rugby union league system. The format is a knockout cup with a first round, second round, third round, semi-finals and a final, typically to be held at a pre-determined ground at the end of April on the same date and venue as the Cup, Shield, Plate and Salver finals. Teams that are knocked out of the first round complete for the Kent Salver.

The current holders of the Kent Vase are Sittingbourne RFC who on the 3rd May 2026 beat Cliffe Crusaders 37-12 in the final at Canterbury Rugby Club.

== Kent Vase winners ==
Kent Vase Finals
Season	Winner	Score	Runners–up	Venue
2001-02	Bromley			
2002-03	Whitstable		Old Elthamians	Merton Lane, Canterbury, Kent
2003-04	Old Elthamians			
2004-05	Dover			
2005-06	Beccehamian		Old Gravesendians	
2006-07	Old Gravesendians			
2007-08	Old Gravesendians	20-12	Medway	Merton Lane, Canterbury, Kent
2008-09	Medway		Old Gravesendians	The Jack Williams Memorial Ground, Aylesford, Kent
2009-10	Lordswood	19-18	Cranbrook	Foxbury Avenue, Chislehurst, London
2010-11	Sheppey	53-14	Southwark Lancers	Merton Lane, Canterbury, Kent
2011-12	Gillingham Anchorians	20-9	Dartfordians	Priestfields, Rochester, Kent
2012-13	Beccehamian	37-17	Old Gravesendians	Canterbury Road, Ashford, Kent
2013-14	Cranbrook	28-26	Old Williamsonian	Footscray Road, New Eltham, London
2014-15	Cranbrook	17-10	Beccehamian	Tomlin Ground, Cranbrook, Kent
2015-16	Snowdown Colliery	31-5	Beccehamian	The Jack Williams Memorial Ground, Aylesford, Kent
2016-17	Beccehamian	84-0	King's College Hospital	Merton Lane, Canterbury, Kent
2017-18	Beccehamian	48-22	Cranbrook	Footscray Road, New Eltham, London
2018-19				
2022-23	Old Gravesendians	37-33	Faversham	Cranbrook RFC, Cranbrook, Kent
2023-24	Whitstable	25-14	Brockleians	Merton Lane, Canterbury, Kent
2024-25	Brockleians	25-24	Cliffe Crusaders	Aylesford Bulls RFC
2025-26	Sittingbourne	37-12	Cliffe Crusaders	Canterbury Rugby Club

== Number of wins ==
- Beccehamian (4)
- Old Gravesendians (3)
- Cranbrook (2)
- Whitstable (2)
- Bromley (1)
- Dover (1)
- Gillingham Anchorians (1)
- Lordswood (1)
- Medway (1)
- Old Elthamians (1)
- Sheppey (1)
- Snowdown Colliery (1)
- Sittingbourne (1)

== See also ==
- Kent RFU
- Kent Cup
- Kent Shield
- Kent Plate
- Kent Salver
- English rugby union system
- Rugby union in England
