= Kent Cup =

Annual rugby union competition

Kent Challenge Cup
- Sport: Rugby Union
- Instituted: 1890; 136 years ago
- Number of teams: 21
- Country: England
- Holders: Old Elthamians (1st title) (2018–19)
- Most titles: Blackheath (16 titles)
- Website: Kent RFU

The Kent Rugby Challenge Cup is an annual rugby union knock-out club competition organised by the Kent Rugby Football Union. It was first introduced during the 1890–91 season, with the inaugural winners being R.N.C., Greenwich. It was discontinued after the 1926–27 season, but reintroduced during the 1969–70 season, the winners in that year were Sidcup.

The cup cost fifty-two guineas (around £50 in 1890–91) and does not become the property of the winners, being a perpetual challenge cup.

In 1952, during the period the competition had been discontinued, Kent Rugby Football Union provided the Kent Rugby Challenge Cup to Gravesend Rugby Football Club, for presentation to the winners of the North Kent Seven-a-Side Rugby Tournament, an annual tournament organised and run by the club from 1935 until 1972.

The Kent Rugby Challenge Cup competition, now more generally referred to as the Kent Cup competition, is the most important rugby union cup competition in Kent, ahead of the Kent Shield, Kent Vase, Kent Plate and Kent Salver.

The Kent Cup is currently open to the first teams of club sides based in Kent that play in tier 5 (National League 3 London & SE) and tier 6 (London 1 South) of the English rugby union league system, along with the 2nd teams of local clubs that play in tier 3 (National League 1) and tier 4 (National League 2 South). The format is a knockout cup with a first round, second round, semi-finals and a final, typically to be held at a pre-determined ground at the end of April on the same date and venue as the Shield, Vase, Plate and Salver finals. Teams that are knocked out of the first round join the teams knocked out of the first round of the Kent Shield to compete for the Kent Plate.

== Kent Challenge Cup winners ==
Kent Challenge Cup Finals
| Season | Winner | Score | Runners–up | Venue |
| 1890-91 | R.N.C., Greenwich | | Thanet Wanderers | Rectory Field, Blackheath, London |
| 1891-92 | Blackheath "A" | | Chatham Garrison | Rectory Field, Blackheath, London |
| 1892-93 | Queen's | | Sidcup | Charlton |
| 1893-94 | Chatham Garrison | 8–7 | Queen's | Plumstead |
| 1894-95 | Duke of Wellington's Regiment | 5–0 | Queen's | Charlton |
| 1895-96 | Royal Engineers | | Queen's | Catford |
| 1896-97 | Park House | | Royal Engineers | Rectory Field, Blackheath, London |
| 1897-98 | Park House | | Royal Engineers | Rectory Field, Blackheath, London |
| 1898-99 | Park House | | Duke of Wellington's Regiment | Berlin Road, Catford |
| 1899-1900 | Catford Bridge | | R.N.C., Greenwich | Catford |
| 1900-01 | R.N.C., Greenwich | | Catford Bridge | Catford |
| 1901-02 | R.N.C., Greenwich | | Royal Engineers | Rectory Field, Blackheath, London |
| 1902-03 | Catford Bridge | 13–0 | Royal Engineers (Chatham) | Catford |
| 1903-04 | R.N.C., Greenwich | | Park House | Rectory Field, Blackheath, London |
| 1904-05 | Catford Bridge | | R.N.C., Greenwich | Rectory Field, Blackheath, London |
| 1905-06 | R.N.C., Greenwich | | Catford Bridge | Rectory Field, Blackheath, London |
| 1906-07 | Catford Bridge | | Old Charltonians | Catford |
| 1907-08 | R.N.C., Greenwich | 18–3 | Old Charltonians | Rectory Field, Blackheath, London |
| 1908-09 | R.N.C., Greenwich | 18–0 | Royal Engineers | |
| 1909-10 | Catford Bridge | 17–8 | Guy's Hospital | Rectory Field, Blackheath, London |
| 1910-11 | Catford Bridge | 5–0 | R.N.C., Greenwich | Rectory Field, Blackheath, London |
| 1911-12 | Royal Engineers | | Old Charltonians | Rectory Field, Blackheath, London |
| 1912-13 | Royal Engineers | | Goldsmiths' College | Catford |
| 1913-14 | Royal Engineers | 8–6 | R.N.C., Greenwich | Rectory Field, Blackheath, London |
| 1914-18 | (War. No Competition) | | | |
| 1919-20 | | | | |
| 1920-21 | (Competition unfinished) | | | |
| 1921-22 | R.N.C., Greenwich | | Royal Engineers | Rectory Field, Blackheath, London |
| 1922-23 | Guy's Hospital "A" | | Old Dunstonians | Rectory Field, Blackheath, London |
| 1923-24 | R.N.C., Greenwich | | | |
| 1924-25 | | | | |
| 1925-26 | King's Own Royal Regiment (Shorncliffe) | 19–17 | Westcombe Park | Rectory Field, Blackheath, London |
| 1926-27 | Guy's Hospital "A" | | | |
| 1969-70 | Sidcup | | | |
| 1970–71 | Sidcup | | | |
| 1971–72 | Blackheath | | | |
| 1972–73 | Sidcup | | | |
| 1973–74 | Maidstone | | | |
| 1974–75 | Canterbury | | | |
| 1975–76 | Sidcup | | | |
| 1976–77 | Blackheath | 10–3 | Old Dunstonian | |
| 1977–78 | Blackheath | | | |
| 1978–79 | Maidstone | | | |
| 1979–80 | Blackheath | | | |
| 1980–81 | Blackheath | | | |
| 1981–82 | Blackheath | | | |
| 1982–83 | Blackheath | | | |
| 1983–84 | Blackheath | | | |
| 1984–85 | Blackheath | | | |
| 1985–86 | Blackheath | | | |
| 1986–87 | Blackheath | | | |
| 1987–88 | Maidstone | | | |
| 1988–89 | Askeans | | | |
| 1989–90 | Gravesend | 12–0 | Park House | |
| 1990–91 | Sidcup | | | |
| 1991–92 | Old Colfeians | | Westcombe Park | Donald Biggs Drive, Gravesend, DA12 2TL |
| 1992–93 | Westcombe Park | | | |
| 1993–94 | Old Colfeians | | Charlton Park | Mote Park, Willow Way, Maidstone, ME15 7RN |
| 1994–95 | Westcombe Park | | | |
| 1995–96 | Blackheath | | | |
| 1996–97 | Sevenoaks | 28–24 | Canterbury | |
| 1997–98 | Westcombe Park | | Old Colfeians | Donald Biggs Drive, Gravesend, DA12 2TL |
| 1998–99 | Westcombe Park | | | |
| 1999-00 | Westcombe Park | | Maidstone | |
| 2000–01 | Thanet Wanderers | | | |
| 2001–02 | Westcombe Park | 41–21 | Thanet Wanderers | Rectory Field, Blackheath, London |
| 2002–03 | Blackheath | | Old Colfeians | |
| 2003–04 | Westcombe Park | 36–0 | Blackheath | Merton Lane, Canterbury, Kent |
| 2004–05 | Canterbury | | Westcombe Park | |
| 2005–06 | Canterbury | | Blackheath | Knole Paddock, Sevenoaks, Kent |
| 2006–07 | Canterbury | 41–27 | Blackheath | William Davey Memorial Ground, Maidstone, Kent |
| 2007–08 | Canterbury | 28–18 | Blackheath | Tomlin Ground, Cranbrook, Kent |
| 2008–09 | Blackheath | | Gravesend | The Jack Williams Memorial Ground, Aylesford, Kent |
| 2009–10 | Gravesend | 24–23 | Old Elthamians | Foxbury Avenue, Chislehurst, London |
| 2010–11 | Gravesend | 34–32 | Tonbridge Juddians | Merton Lane, Canterbury, Kent |
| 2011–12 | Canterbury | 22–14 | Westcombe Park | Priestfields, Rochester, Kent |
| 2012–13 | Blackheath II | 43–25 | Old Elthamians | Canterbury Road, Ashford, Kent |
| 2013–14 | Gravesend | 27–24 | Blackheath II | Footscray Road, New Eltham, London |
| 2014–15 | Tonbridge Juddians | 34–17 | Old Elthamians II | Tomlin Ground, Cranbrook, Kent |
| 2015–16 | Westcombe Park | 16–12 | Blackheath II | The Jack Williams Memorial Ground, Aylesford, Kent |
| 2016–17 | Tonbridge Juddians | 62–3 | Sidcup | Merton Lane, Canterbury, Kent |
| 2017–18 | Sidcup | 33–27 | Old Elthamians II | Footscray Road, New Eltham, London |
| 2018–19 | Old Elthamians | 55-29 | Sidcup | 60a Broad Walk, Kidbrooke, London, SE3 8NB |
| 2019-20 | (Competition unfinished) | | | |
| 2020-21 | | | | |

== Number of wins ==
- Blackheath (16) (Note: Blackheath's Kent Cup victories include wins by both the 1st and 2nd teams.)
- R.N.C., Greenwich (9)
- Westcombe Park (8)
- Canterbury (6)
- Catford Bridge (6)
- Sidcup (6)
- Gravesend (4)
- Royal Engineers (4)
- Maidstone (3)
- Park House (3)
- Askeans (2)
- Guy's Hospital "A" (2)
- Old Colfeians (2)
- Tonbridge Juddians (2)
- Chatham Garrison (1)
- Duke of Wellington's Regiment (1)
- King's Own Regiment (1)
- Old Elthamians (1)
- Queen's (1)
- Sevenoaks (1)
- Thanet Wanderers (1)

== See also ==
- Kent RFU
- Kent Shield
- Kent Vase
- Kent Plate
- Kent Salver
- English rugby union system
- Rugby union in England
