= Counties 3 Kent =

English rugby union league

- Current season or competition: 2024-25 Counties 3 Kent
- Sport: Rugby union
- Instituted: 1987; 39 years ago
- Number of teams: 10
- Country: England
- Most titles: Park House (4 titles)
- Website: englandrugby.com

Counties 3 Kent (formerly Kent 1 known as Shepherd Neame Kent 1 for sponsorship reasons) is an English level 9 Rugby Union League and is made up of teams predominantly from south-east London and Kent. The teams play home and away matches from September through to April. The league champions move up to Counties 2 Kent. Relegated teams drop down to Counties 4 Kent. Following the RFU's Adult Competition Review, from season 2022-23 it adopted its current name Counties 3 Kent.

Each year some of the clubs in this division also take part in the RFU Junior Vase - a level 9-12 national competition.

== Teams for 2026-27 ==
Departing were Sittingbourne (Champions) and Tunbridge Wells II, (Runner up) both promoted to Counties 2 Kent while New Ash Green were relegated to Counties 4 Kent.

Old Williamsonians (10th in 2025-26) withdrew from the league a week before the new season began citing insufficient playing numbers reducing the league from eleven clubs to ten.

Team	Ground	Capacity	City/Area	Previous season
Brockleians	Civil Service Sports Ground		Eltham, London	9th
Canterbury III	Marine Travel Ground	1,500 (75 seats)	Canterbury, Kent	7th
Cliffe Crusaders	Recreation Ground		Cliffe, Kent	Promoted from Counties 4 Kent (runners-up)
Dartford Valley	Leigh Academy		Dartford, Kent	6th
Gravesend II	Rectory Field		Gravesend, Kent	5th
Hastings & Bexhill	William Parker Lower School		Hastings, East Sussex	3rd
Old Gravesendians	Fleetway Sports Ground		Gravesend, Kent	8th
Sevenoaks III	Knole Paddock	1,000	Sevenoaks, Kent	Promoted from Counties 4 Kent (champions)
Vigo	Swanswood Field		Vigo, Kent	Relegated from Counties 2 Kent (11th)
Whitstable	Reeves Way		Chestfield, Kent	4th

Locations of the 2026-27 Counties 3 Kent teams in Greater London
Locations of the 2026-27 Counties 3 Kent teams in Kent & East Sussex

== Teams for 2025–26 ==
Departing were Tonbridge Juddians II and Beckenham II, both promoted to Counties 2 Kent.

Old Dunstonians (9th in 2024-25) withdrew before the season started.

Team	Ground	Capacity	City/Area	Previous season
Brockleians	Civil Service Sports Ground		Eltham, London	4th
Canterbury III	Marine Travel Ground	1,500 (75 seats)	Canterbury, Kent	Promoted from Counties 4 Kent (champions)
Dartford Valley	Leigh Academy		Dartford, Kent	Relegated from Counties 2 Kent (12th)
Gravesend II	Rectory Field		Gravesend, Kent	11th
Hastings & Bexhill	William Parker Lower School		Hastings, East Sussex	3rd
New Ash Green	New Ash Green Sports Pavilion		New Ash Green, Kent	10th
Old Gravesendians	Fleetway Sports Ground		Gravesend, Kent	8th
Old Williamsonians	Sir Joseph Williamson's Mathematical School		Rochester, Kent	Promoted from Counties 4 Kent (runners-up)
Sittingbourne	Gore Court Cricket Club		Sittingbourne, Kent	5th
Tunbridge Wells II	St Marks Recreation Ground	3,000	Royal Tunbridge Wells, Kent	6th
Whitstable	Reeves Way		Chestfield, Kent	7th

Locations of the 2025-26 Counties 3 Kent teams in Greater London
Locations of the 2025-26 Counties 3 Kent teams in Kent & East Sussex

== Teams for 2024–25 ==
Departing were Old Elthamians and Old Alleynians II, both promoted to Counties 2 Kent. Faversham (10th) were relegated to Counties 4 Kent.

Joining were Old Dunstonians relegated from Counties 2 Kent together with Beckenham II, Brockleians and Old Gravesendians, all promoted from Counties 4 Kent

Team	Ground	Capacity	City/Area	Previous season
Beckenham II	Balmoral Avenue		Beckenham, London	Promoted from Counties 4 Kent (champions)
Brockleians	Civil Service Sports Ground		Eltham, London	Promoted from Counties 4 Kent (runners-up)
Gravesend II	Rectory Field		Gravesend, Kent	8th
Hastings & Bexhill	William Parker Lower School		Hastings, East Sussex	7th
New Ash Green	New Ash Green Sports Pavilion		New Ash Green, Kent	9th
Old Dunstonians	St. Dunstan's Lane		Beckenham, London	Relegated from Counties 2 Kent
Old Gravesendians	Fleetway Sports Ground		Gravesend, Kent	Promoted from Counties 4 Kent (3rd)
Sittingbourne	Gore Court Cricket Club		Sittingbourne, Kent	4th
Tonbridge Juddians II	The Slade	1,500	Tonbridge, Kent	3rd
Tunbridge Wells II	St Marks Recreation Ground	3,000	Royal Tunbridge Wells, Kent	5th
Whitstable	Reeves Way		Chestfield, Kent	6th

Locations of the 2024-25 Counties 3 Kent teams in Greater London
Locations of the 2024-25 Counties 3 Kent teams in Kent & East Sussex

== Teams for 2023–24 ==
Departing were Dartford Valley and Medway II, both promoted to Counties 2 Kent. King's College Hospital (9th) and Footscray (10th) were relegated to Counties 4 Kent.

Joining were Hastings & Bexhill relegated from Counties 2 Kent together with Sittingbourne promoted from Counties 4 Kent and Tonbridge Juddians III who upon joining this league were rebranded as Tonbridge Juddians II.

Team	Ground	Capacity	City/Area	Previous season
Faversham	Recreation Ground		Faversham, Kent	5th
Gravesend II	Rectory Field		Gravesend, Kent	8th
Hastings & Bexhill	William Parker Lower School		Hastings, East Sussex	Relegated from Counties 2 Kent
New Ash Green	New Ash Green Sports Pavilion		New Ash Green, Kent	7th
Old Alleynians II	The Common		Dulwich, London	4th
Old Elthamians	Hospital Ground		Chislehurst, London	3rd
Sittingbourne	Gore Court Cricket Club		Sittingbourne, Kent	Promoted from Counties 4 Kent (runners-up)
Tonbridge Juddians II	The Slade	1,500	Tonbridge, Kent	Promoted from Counties 4 Kent (champions)
Tunbridge Wells II	St Marks Recreation Ground	3,000	Royal Tunbridge Wells, Kent	New entry
Whitstable	Reeves Way		Chestfield, Kent	6th

Locations of the 2023-24 Counties 3 Kent teams in Greater London
Locations of the 2023-24 Counties 3 Kent teams in Kent & East Sussex

== Teams for 2022–23 ==
This was the first season following the RFU Adult Competition Review with the league adopting its new name of Counties 3 Kent.

Returning were 4 of the 9 teams who competed in the previous season's league.

Departing were Hastings & Bexhill and Park House, both promoted to Counties 2 Kent. Old Williamsonians (3rd), Cliffe Crusaders (7th), Brockleians (9th) dropped to Counties 4 Kent.

Joining were Dartford Valley and Whitstable, promoted from Kent 2. New to the league were Gravesend II, Old Elthamians, Old Alleynians II and Medway II.

Team	Ground	Capacity	City/Area	Previous season
Dartford Valley	Leigh Academy		Dartford, Kent	Promoted from Kent 2 (champions)
Faversham	Recreation Ground		Faversham, Kent	5th
Footscray	Footscray Playing Fields		New Eltham, London	8th
Gravesend II	Rectory Field		Gravesend, Kent	New entry
King's College Hospital	Dulwich Sports Ground		Dulwich, London	6th
Medway II	Priestfields		Rochester, Kent	New entry
New Ash Green	New Ash Green Sports Pavilion		New Ash Green, Kent	4th
Old Alleynians II	The Common		Dulwich, London	New entry
Old Elthamians	Hospital Ground		Chislehurst, London	New entry
Whitstable	Reeves Way		Chestfield, Kent	Promoted from Kent 2 (runners-up)

Locations of the 2022-23 Counties 3 Kent teams in Greater London
Locations of the 2022-23 Counties 3 Kent teams in Kent

== Participating clubs 2021–22 ==
The teams competing in 2021-22 achieved their places in the league based on performances in 2019–20, the 'previous season' column in the table below refers to that season not 2020–21.

Despite finishing 7th in season 2019–20, HSBC did not return to the league for the current season.

Team	Ground	Capacity	City/Area	Previous season
Brockleians	Civil Service Sports Ground		Eltham, London	Promoted from Kent 2 (champions)
Cliffe Crusaders	Recreation Ground		Cliffe, Kent	6th
Faversham	Recreation Ground		Faversham, Kent	5th
Footscray	Footscray Playing Fields		New Eltham, London	Promoted from Kent 2 (runners up)
Hastings & Bexhill	William Parker Lower School		Hastings, East Sussex	4th
King's College Hospital	Dulwich Sports Ground		Dulwich, London	3rd
New Ash Green	New Ash Green Sports Pavilion		New Ash Green, Kent	8th
Old Williamsonians	Sir Joseph Williamson's Mathematical School		Rochester, Kent	Relegated from London 3 SE (12th)
Park House	Barnet Wood Road		Hayes, London	Relegated from London 3 SE (11th)

Locations of the 2021-22 Shepherd Neame Kent 1 teams in Greater London
Locations of the 2021-22 Shepherd Neame Kent 1 teams in Kent & East Sussex

== Season 2020–21 ==
On 30 October 2020 the RFU announced that due to the coronavirus pandemic a decision had been taken to cancel Adult Competitive Leagues (National League 1 and below) for the 2020/21 season meaning Kent 1 was not contested.

== Participating clubs 2019–20 ==
Team	Ground	Capacity	City/Area	Previous season
Cliffe Crusaders	Recreation Ground		Cliffe, Kent	Promoted from Kent 2 (champions)
Cranbrook	Tomlin Ground		Cranbrook, Kent	4th
Faversham	Recreation Ground		Faversham, Kent	Promoted from Kent 2 (runners up)
Hastings & Bexhill	William Parker Lower School		Hastings, East Sussex	Relegated from London 3 SE (10th)
HSBC	HSBC Sports Ground		Beckenham, London	6th
King's College Hospital	Dulwich Sports Ground		Dulwich, London	7th
New Ash Green	New Ash Green Sports Pavilion		New Ash Green, Kent	9th
Old Gravesendians	Fleetway Sports Ground		Gravesend, Kent	5th
Southwark Lancers	Burgess Park		Camberwell, London	3rd
Whitstable	Reeves Way		Chestfield, Kent	8th

Locations of the 2019-20 Shepherd Neame Kent 1 teams in Greater London
Locations of the 2019-20 Shepherd Neame Kent 1 teams in Kent & East Sussex

== Participating clubs 2018–19 ==
Team	Ground	Capacity	City/Area	Previous season
Ashford	Kinney's Field		Ashford, Kent	11th (not relegated)
Cranbrook	Tomlin Ground		Cranbrook, Kent	5th
Footscray	Footscray Playing Fields		New Eltham, London	Promoted from Kent 2 (runners up)
Gillingham Anchorians	Darland Banks		Gillingham, Kent	4th
HSBC	HSBC Sports Ground		Beckenham, London	7th
King's College Hospital	Dulwich Sports Ground		Dulwich, London	3rd
New Ash Green	New Ash Green Sports Pavilion		New Ash Green, Kent	11th
Old Gravesendians	Fleetway Sports Ground		Gravesend, Kent	9th
Sheppey	Stupple Field		Minster, Kent	Relegated from London 3 SE (11th)
Southwark Lancers	Burgess Park		Camberwell, London	10th
Whitstable	Reeves Way		Chestfield, Kent	Promoted from Kent 2 (champions)

Locations of the 2018-19 Shepherd Neame Kent 1 teams in Greater London
Locations of the 2018-19 Shepherd Neame Kent 1 teams in Kent

== Participating clubs 2017–18 ==
Team	Ground	Capacity	City/Area	Previous season
Ashford	Kinney's Field		Ashford, Kent	Relegated from London 3 South East (12th)
Beccehamian	Sparrow's Den		West Wickham, London	4th
Cranbrook	Tomlin Ground		Cranbrook, Kent	3rd
Gillingham Anchorians	Darland Banks		Gillingham, Kent	Relegated from London 3 South East (10th)
HSBC	HSBC Sports Ground		Beckenham, London	5th
King's College Hospital	Dulwich Sports Ground		Dulwich, London	6th
New Ash Green	New Ash Green Sports Pavilion		New Ash Green, Kent	9th
Old Gravesendians	Fleetway Sports Ground		Gravesend, Kent	Promoted from Kent 2 (champions)
Royal Bank of Scotland	Goals Beckenham		Beckenham, London	Promoted from Kent 2 (runners up)
Sittingbourne	Gore Court Cricket Club		Sittingbourne, Kent	10th
Southwark Lancers	Burgess Park		Camberwell, London	7th
Vigo	Swanswood Field		Vigo, Kent	8th

Locations of the 2017-18 Shepherd Neame Kent 1 teams in Greater London
Locations of the 2017-18 Shepherd Neame Kent 1 teams in Kent

== Participating clubs 2016–17 ==
- Beccehamaian
- Brockleians
- Hastings & Bexhill
- HSBC
- King's College Hospital
- Lordswood
- New Ash Green
- Old Gravesendians
- Sittingbourne (promoted from Kent 2)
- Southwark Lancers
- Snowdon C.W. (promoted from Kent 2)
- Vigo

== Participating clubs 2015–16 ==
- Beccehamaian
- Brockleians (promoted from Kent 2)
- Hastings & Bexhill (relegated from London 3 South East)
- HSBC
- King's College Hospital
- Lordswood
- New Ash Green (promoted from Kent 2)
- Old Gravesendians
- Old Williamsonians
- Sheppey
- Southwark Lancers
- Vigo

== Participating clubs 2014–15 ==
- Beccehamian (relegated from London 3 South East)
- Bexley (promoted from Kent 2)
- Cranbrook
- HSBC
- King's College Hospital
- Lordswood
- Old Gravesendians
- Old Williamsonians
- Sheppey (relegated from London 3 South East)
- Sittingbourne
- Southwark Lancers
- Vigo

== Participating clubs 2010–11 ==
- Ashford
- Beccehamian
- Cranbrook
- Dartfordians
- Erith
- Gillingham Anchorians.
- Guys' Kings' & St Thomas' Hospital
- Hastings and Bexhill
- HSBC
- New Ash Green
- Old Gravesendians
- Shooters Hill
- Sittingbourne
- Vigo
- Whitstable

== Original teams ==
When league rugby began in 1987 this division contained the following teams:

- Bromley
- Charlton Park
- Erith
- Medway
- NatWest Bank
- Old Elthamians
- Old Shootershillians
- Park House
- Sevenoaks
- Thanet Wanderers
- Tonbridge (Note: Tonbridge would later merge with Old Juddian in 1999 to form Tonbridge Juddians RFC.)

== Kent 1 honours ==
=== Kent 1 (1987–1993) ===
The original Kent 1 was a tier 8 league with promotion up to London 3 South East and relegation down to Kent 2.

Kent 1
Season	No of Teams	Champions	Runners–up	Relegated Teams
1987–88	11	Charlton Park	Erith	Old Shootershillians, NatWest Bank, Sevenoaks
1988–89	11	Gillingham Anchorians	Betteshanger	Old Elthamians, Tonbridge
1989–90	11	Park House	Medway	Canterbury, Dover
1990–91	11	Thanet Wanderers	Medway	Met Police Hayes, Dover, Snowdown C.W.
1991–92	11	Erith	Gillingham Anchorians	No relegation (Note: No relegation as Kent 1 to increase from 11 to 13 teams.)
1992–93	13	Canterbury	Sevenoaks	Sittingbourne, Tonbridge
Green backgrounds are promotion places.

=== Kent 1 (1993–1996) ===
The creation of National 5 South meant that Kent 1 dropped from a tier 8 league to a tier 9 league for the years that National 5 South was active. Promotion and relegation continued to London 3 South East and Kent 2 respectively.

Kent 1
Season	No of Teams	Champions	Runners–up	Relegated Teams
1993–94	13	Park House	Sevenoaks	NatWest Bank, New Ash Green, Snowdown C.W.
1994–95	13	Sevenoaks	Tunbridge Wells	Thames Polytechnic, Betteshanger
1995–96	13	Tunbridge Wells	Gillingham Anchorians	Old Elthamians, Medway, Erith (Note: 11th place Erith would drop out of the leagues before the start of the following season.)
Green backgrounds are promotion places.

=== Kent 1 (1996–2000) ===
The cancellation of National 5 South at the end of the 1995–96 season meant that Kent 1 reverted to being a tier 8 league. Promotion and relegation continued to London 3 South East and Kent 2 respectively.

Kent 1
Season	No of Teams	Champions	Runners–up	Relegated Teams
1996–97	12	Cranbrook	Medway (Note: 3rd place Sheppey also promoted.)	No relegation (Note: No relegation as Kent 1 to increase from 12 to 16 teams.)
1997–98	16	Folkestone	Dartfordians	Deal Wanderers, Snowdown C.W.
1998–99	17	Dartfordians	Guys' Kings' & St Thomas' Hospital	Met Police Hayes, Sittingbourne
1999–00	15	Old Dunstonians	Betteshanger	Sheppey, HSBC, Ashford, Dover (Note: More relegations than normal due to league restructuring - Kent 2 would become a single division and Kent 3 and Kent 4 were created for the following season.)
Green backgrounds are promotion places.

=== Kent 1 (2000–2009) ===
The introduction of London 4 South East ahead of the 2000–01 season meant Kent 1 dropped to become a tier 9 league with promotion to this new division. Relegation continued to Kent 2.

Kent 1
Season	No of Teams	Champions	Runners–up	Relegated Teams
2000–01	10	Guys' Kings' & St Thomas' Hospital	Betteshanger	Old Elthamians
2001–02	10	Bromley	Whitstable	Brockleians, Medway, Park House
2002–03	10	Aylesford Bulls	Ashford	Erith, New Ash Green
2003–04	10	Lordswood	Old Elthamians	Askean
2004–05	10	Dover	Sittingbourne	Sheppey
2005–06	10	Beccehamian	Ashford	New Ash Green
2006–07	10	Whitstable	Park House	Brockleians, Sheppey, Cranbrook
2007–08	10	Park House	Old Gravesendians	No relegation (Note: No relegation due to Kent 3 folding at the end of the season and the subsequent league restructuring meant that the number of teams in Kent 1 would increase to 12 for the following season.)
2008–09	12	Medway	Old Gravesendians	Askean
Green backgrounds are promotion places.

=== Kent 1 (2009–present) ===
Kent 1 remained a tier 9 league despite national restructuring by the RFU. Promotion was to London 3 South East (formerly London 4 South East) and relegation to Kent 2.

Kent 1
Season	No of Teams	Champions	Runners–up	Relegated Teams
2009–10	12	Dartfordians	Cranbrook	Guys' Kings' & St Thomas' Hospital, Erith
2010–11	11	Ashford	Sheppey	Lordswood
2011–12	12	Gillingham Anchorians	Vigo	New Ash Green
2012–13	11	Dartfordians	Beccehamian	Whitstable
2013–14	12	Park House	Hastings & Bexhill	Footscray, Shooters Hill
2014–15	12	Cranbrook	Sheppey	Bexley, Sittingbourne
2015–16	12	Sheppey	Old Williamsonians	Old Gravesendians, Lordswood
2016–17	12	Hastings & Bexhill	Old Williamsonians	Snowdown C.W., Brockleians
2017–18	12	Beccehamian	Vigo	Sittingbourne
2018–19	11 (Note: Reduced from 12 to 11 teams after Royal Bank of Scotland withdrew from league.)	Ashford	Gillingham Anchorians	Sheppey, Footscray
2019–20	10	Southwark Lancers	Cranbrook	Whitstable, Old Gravesendians
2020–21				
Green backgrounds are promotion places.

== Promotion play-offs ==
Since the 2000–01 season there has been a play-off between the runners-up of Kent 1 and Sussex 1 for the third and final promotion place to London 3 South East. The team with the superior league record has home advantage in the tie. At the end of the 2019–20 season the Kent 1 teams have been the most successful with fourteen wins to the Sussex 1 teams five; and the home team has won promotion on eleven occasions compared to the away teams eight.

Kent 1 v Sussex 1 promotion play-off results
Season	Home team	Score	Away team	Venue	Attendance
2000–01	Hastings & Bexhill (S)	12-29	Betteshanger (K)	William Parker Lower School, Hastings, East Sussex	
2001–02	Heathfield & Waldron (S)	25-12	Whitstable (K)	Hardy Roberts Recreational Ground, Cross In Hand, Heathfield, East Sussex	
2002–03	Ashford (K)	10-0	Hastings & Bexhill (S)	Canterbury Road, Ashford, Kent	
2003–04	Hastings & Bexhill (S)	13-21	Old Elthamians (K)	William Parker Lower School, Hastings, East Sussex	
2004–05	Hastings & Bexhill (S)	0-22	Sittingbourne (K)	William Parker Lower School, Hastings, East Sussex	
2005–06	Hastings & Bexhill (S)	17-18	Ashford (K)	William Parker Lower School, Hastings, East Sussex	
2006–07	Horsham (S)	33-7	Park House (K)	Coolhurst Ground, Horsham, West Sussex	
2007–08	Old Gravesendians (K)	8-14	East Grinstead (S)	Fleetway Sports Ground, Gravesend, Kent	
2008–09	Old Gravesendians (K)	10-5	Uckfield (S)	Fleetway Sports Ground, Gravesend, Kent	300
2009–10	Uckfield (S)	19-21	Cranbrook (K)	Hempstead Playing Fields, Uckfield, East Sussex	
2010–11	Sheppey (K)	42-10	Burgess Hill (S)	Stupple Field, Minster, Kent	500
2011–12	Vigo (K)	10-7	Burgess Hill (S) (Note: Despite finishing 3rd in the league Burgess Hill took 2nd placed East Grinstead II place in the 2011-12 promotion playoff as East Grinstead's first team were in the division above.)	Swanswood Field, Meopham, Kent	400
2012–13	Eastbourne (S)	0-47	Beccehamian (K)	Park Avenue, Eastbourne, East Sussex	
2013–14	Crawley (S)	22-41	Hastings & Bexhill (K)	Willoughby Fields Pavilion, Crawley, West Sussex	
2014–15	Burgess Hill (S)	26-23	Sheppey (K)	Southway Recreation Ground, Burgess Hill, West Sussex	
2015–16	Haywards Heath (S)	13-8	Old Williamsonians (K)	Whitemans Green, Cuckfield, West Sussex	
2016–17	Old Williamsonians (K)	20-17	Uckfield (S)	Sir Joseph Williamson's Mathematical School, Rochester, Kent	
2017–18	Vigo (K)	31-17	Uckfield (S)	Swanswood Field, Meopham, Kent	
2018–19	Gillingham Anchorians (K)	23-21	Crawley (S)	Darland Banks, Gillingham, Kent	
2019–20	Cancelled due to COVID-19 pandemic in the United Kingdom. Best ranked runner up - Cranbrook (K) - promoted instead.				
2020–21					
Green background is the promoted team. K = Kent 1 and S = Sussex 1

== Number of league titles ==
- Park House (4)
- Dartfordians (3)
- Ashford (2)
- Beccehamian (2)
- Cranbrook (2)
- Gillingham Anchorians (2)
- Aylesford Bulls (1)
- Bromley (1)
- Canterbury (1)
- Charlton Park (1)
- Dover (1)
- Erith (1)
- Folkestone (1)
- Guys' Kings' & St Thomas' Hospital (1)
- Hastings & Bexhill (1)
- Lordswood (1)
- Medway (1)
- Old Dunstonians (1)
- Sevenoaks (1)
- Sheppey (1)
- Southwark Lancers (1)
- Thanet Wanderers (1)
- Tunbridge Wells (1)
- Whitstable (1)

== See also ==
- London & SE Division RFU
- Kent RFU
- English rugby union system
- Rugby union in England
