= 2014 County Championship Plate =

- Countries: England
- Date: 10 May 2014 - 1 June 2014
- Champions: Kent (2nd title)
- Runners-up: Durham County
- Attendance: 2,298 (average 383 per match)
- Highest attendance: 1,200 Kent v Somerset (24 May 2014)
- Lowest attendance: 150 East Midlands v Eastern Counties (10 May 2014)
- Top point scorer: (England) Ben Summers (Kent) 32
- Top try scorer: (England) Cameron Mitchell (England) Ian Wilson (both Durham County) 3

The 2014 County Championship Plate, also known as Bill Beaumont Cup Division 2, was the 13th version of the annual English rugby union, County Championship organized by the RFU for the tier 2 English counties. Each county drew its players from rugby union clubs from the third tier and below of the English rugby union league system (typically National League 1, National League 2 South or National League 2 North). The counties were divided into two regional pools (north/south) with three teams in the north division and three in the south, with the winners of each pool meeting in the final held at Twickenham Stadium. New teams to the division included Durham County and Kent who were relegated from the 2013 Bill Beaumont Cup.

By the end of the group stage, both Durham County and Kent, relegated the previous season, made an instant return to the first division by winning their respective groups with relative ease. At the final at Twickenham, Kent were comfortable winners, defeating Durham County 31-23 to claim their first title at Twickenham for 28 years.

== Competition format ==
The competition format involved six teams divided into two regional group stages of three teams each, divided into north and south, with each team playing each other once. The top side in each group went through to the final held at Twickenham Stadium on 1 June 2014.

== Participating counties and ground locations ==
Locations of the 2014 County Championship Plate county teams

County	Stadium(s)	Capacity	City/Area
Devon	Astley Park	1,800	Brixham, Devon
Durham County	Blackwell Meadows	3,000	Darlington, County Durham
East Midlands	Cut Throat Lane	N/A	Wellingborough, Northamptonshire
Eastern Counties	The Haberden	3,000 (135 seats)	Bury St Edmunds, Suffolk
Kent	Priestfields	N/A	Rochester, Kent
Somerset	Bath Road	5,000	Bridgwater, Somerset

== Group stage ==
=== Division 2 North ===
2014 County Championship Plate Division 2 North Table
	County	Played	Won	Drawn	Lost	Points For	Points Against	Points Difference	Try Bonus	Losing Bonus	Points
1	Durham County (P)	2	2	0	0	61	21	40	1	0	9
2	East Midlands	2	1	0	1	35	50	-15	1	0	5
3	Eastern Counties	2	0	0	2	39	64	-25	1	1	2
If teams are level at any stage, tiebreakers are applied in the following order: 1. Number of matches won 2. Difference between points for and against 3. Total number of points for 4. Aggregate number of points scored in matches between tied teams 5. Number of matches won excluding the first match, then the second and so on until the tie is settled
Green background means the county qualified for the final and is also promoted to the Division 1 North of the Bill Beaumont Cup for the following season. Updated: 24 May 2014; Source: "County Championships". englandrugby.com.

==== Round 1 ====
10 May 2014
15:00

(BP) East Midlands	27 - 26	Eastern Counties (2BP)

Cut Throat Lane, Wellingborough
Attendance: 150
Referee: Michael Harris

==== Round 2 ====
17 May 2014
14:15

Eastern Counties	13 - 37	Durham County (BP)
	Report

The Haberden, Bury St Edmunds
Attendance: 220
Referee: Simon Dodds

==== Round 3 ====
24 May 2014
15:00

Durham County	24 - 8	East Midlands
	Report

Blackwell Meadows, Darlington
Attendance: 245
Referee: Steven Bennett

=== Division 2 South ===
2014 County Championship Plate Division 2 South Table
	County	Played	Won	Drawn	Lost	Points For	Points Against	Points Difference	Try Bonus	Losing Bonus	Points
1	Kent (P)	2	2	0	0	62	26	36	1	0	9
2	Somerset	2	1	0	1	29	43	-14	0	0	4
3	Devon	2	0	0	2	32	54	-22	0	1	1
If teams are level at any stage, tiebreakers are applied in the following order: 1. Number of matches won 2. Difference between points for and against 3. Total number of points for 4. Aggregate number of points scored in matches between tied teams 5. Number of matches won excluding the first match, then the second and so on until the tie is settled
Green background means the county qualified for the final and is also promoted to the Division 1 South of the Bill Beaumont Cup for the following season. Updated: 24 May 2014; Source: "County Championships". englandrugby.com.

==== Round 1 ====
10 May 2014
14:30

Somerset	20 - 15	Devon (BP)
	Report

Bath Road, Bridgwater
Attendance: 194
Referee: Luis Caviglia

==== Round 2 ====
17 May 2014
14:30

Devon	17 - 34	Kent (BP)
	Report

Astley Park, Brixham
Attendance: 289
Referee: Guy Steel-Bodger

==== Round 3 ====
24 May 2014

Kent	28 - 9	Somerset
	Report

Priestfields, Rochester
Attendance: 1,200
Referee: Callum Howard

== Final ==
1 June 2014
10:00

Durham County	23 - 31	Kent
	Report

Twickenham Stadium, London

== Total season attendances ==
- Does not include final at Twickenham which was a neutral venue and involved teams from all three county divisions on the same day

County	Home Games	Total	Average	Highest	Lowest	% Capacity
Devon	1	289	289	289	289	16%
Durham County	1	245	245	245	245	8%
East Midlands	1	150	150	150	150	
Eastern Counties	1	220	220	220	220	7%
Kent	1	1,200	1,200	1,200	1,200	
Somerset	1	194	194	194	194	4%

== Individual statistics ==
- Note if players are tied on tries or points the player with the lowest number of appearances comes first. Also note that points scorers includes tries as well as conversions, penalties and drop goals. Appearance figures also include coming on as substitutes (unused substitutes not included). Statistics also include final.

=== Top points scorers ===
Rank	Player	County	Club Side	Appearances	Points
1	(England) Ben Summers	Kent	Blackheath	2	32
2	(England) Cameron Mitchell	Durham County	Darlington Mowden Park	3	17
3	(England) Ian Wilson	Durham County	Darlington Mowden Park	3	15
4	(England) Tom Hodson	Durham County	Darlington Mowden Park	3	13
5	(England) Luke Giles	Kent	Tonbridge Juddians	2	13

=== Top try scorers ===
Rank	Player	County	Club Side	Appearances	Tries
1	(England) Cameron Mitchell	Durham County	Darlington Mowden Park	3	3
1	(England) Ian Wilson	Durham County	Darlington Mowden Park	3	3
2	(England) Jerone Awesu	Eastern Counties	Colchester	2	2
2	(England) Ben Summers	Kent	Blackheath	2	2
2	(England) Ali Taylor	Somerset	Wellington	2	2

== See also ==
- English rugby union system
- Rugby union in England
