= Kent Shield =

Annual rugby union knock-out club competition

- Sport: Rugby Union
- Instituted: 2015; 11 years ago
- Number of teams: 5
- Country: England
- Holders: Dover (1st title) (2017-18)
- Most titles: Aylesford, Dover, Medway (1 title)
- Website: Kent RFU

The Kent Shield is an annual rugby union knock-out club competition organized by the Kent Rugby Football Union. It was first introduced during the 2015-16 season, with the inaugural winners being Aylesford Bulls. It is the second most important rugby union cup competition in Kent, behind the Kent Cup but ahead of the Kent Vase, Kent Plate and Kent Salver.

The Kent Shield is currently open to the Second teams of club sides based in Kent that play in tier 7 (London 2 South East) and tier 8 (London 3 South East) of the English rugby union league system. The format is a knockout cup with a first round, semi-finals and a final, typically to be held at a pre-determined ground at the end of April on the same date and venue as the Cup, Vase, Plate and Salver finals. Teams that are knocked out of the first round join the teams knocked out of the first round of the Kent Cup to compete for the Kent Plate.

== Kent Shield winners ==
Kent Shield Finals
Season	Winner	Score	Runners–up	Venue
2015-16	Aylesford Bulls	40-5	Sevenoaks	The Jack Williams Memorial Ground, Aylesford, Kent
2016-17	Medway	83-7	Charlton Park	Merton Lane, Canterbury, Kent
2017-18	Dover	22-19 (aet)	Aylesford Bulls	Footscray Road, New Eltham, London
2018-19	Gravesend	26-23	Charlton Park	Broad Walk, Kidbrooke, Greenwich
2019-20

== Number of wins ==
- Aylesford Bulls (1)
- Dover (1)
- Gravesend (1)
- Medway (1)

== See also ==
- Kent RFU
- Kent Cup
- Kent Vase
- Kent Plate
- Kent Salver
- English rugby union system
- Rugby union in England
