= Kent Salver =

English rugby union competition

- Sport: Rugby Union
- Instituted: 2005; 21 years ago
- Number of teams: 18
- Country: England
- Holders: King's College Hospital (1st title) (2025-2026)
- Most titles: Sittingbourne, (3 titles)
- Website: Kent RFU

The Kent Salver is an annual rugby union knock-out club competition organized by the Kent Rugby Football Union. It was first introduced during the 2005-06 season, with the inaugural winners being Guy's Hospital. It is the fifth most important rugby union cup competition in Kent, behind the Kent Cup, Kent Shield, Kent Vase and Kent Plate.

The Kent Salver is currently open to the first teams of club sides based in Kent that have been knocked out of the first round of the Kent Vase. The format is a knockout cup with a first round, semi-finals and a final, typically to be held at a pre-determined ground at the end of April on the same date and venue as the Cup, Shield, Vase and Plate finals.

== Kent Salver winners ==
Kent Salver Finals
Season	Winner	Score	Runners–up	Venue
2005-06	Guy's Hospital			
2006-07	Sheppey			
2007-08	Sittingbourne	13-9	Park House	Merton Lane, Canterbury, Kent
2008-09	Dartfordians	26-25	Cranbrook	The Jack Williams Memorial Ground, Aylesford, Kent
2009-10	Sheppey	29-10	Gillingham Anchorians	Foxbury Avenue, Chislehurst, London
2010-11	Ashford	64-13	Orpington	Merton Lane, Canterbury, Kent
2011-12	Cranbrook	57-10	Brockleians	Priestfields, Rochester, Kent
2012-13	Dartfordians		Shooters Hill	Canterbury Road, Ashford, Kent
2013-14	Brockleians		Bexley	Footscray Road, New Eltham, London
2014-15	Brockleians	26-5	Sheppey	Tomlin Ground, Cranbrook, Kent
2015-16	Sittingbourne		Southwark Lancers	The Jack Williams Memorial Ground, Aylesford, Kent
2016-17	Greenwich	17-7	Snowdown Colliery	Merton Lane, Canterbury, Kent
2017-18	Gillingham Anchorians	33-26	Footscray	Footscray Road, New Eltham, London
2018-19	Faversham	17-15	Southwark Lancers	Charlton Park Kidbrooke London
2021-22	Faversham	14-7	King's College Hospital	Priestfields, Rochester ME1 3AD
2022-23	Cliffe Crusaders	48-14	Sheppey	Cranbrook Rugby Club
2023-24	Cliffe Crusaders	32-7	Ash	Canterbury Rugby Club
2024-25	Sittingbourne	21-0	Ash	Aylesford Bulls Rugby Football Club
2025-26	King's College Hospital	42-19	New Ash Green	Canterbury Rugby Club, CT4 7DZ

== Number of wins ==
- Sittingbourne (3)
- Cliffe Crusaders (2)
- Brockleians (2)
- Dartfordians (2)
- Sheppey (2)
- Ashford (1)
- Cranbrook (1)
- Gillingham Anchorians (1)
- Greenwich (1)
- Guy's Hospital (1)
- Faversham RUFC (2)
- King's College Hospital (1)

== See also ==
- Kent RFU
- Kent Cup
- Kent Shield
- Kent Vase
- Kent Plate
- English rugby union system
- Rugby union in England
