= Regional 2 South East =

English rugby union regional league

- Current season or competition: 2025–26 Regional 2 South East
- Sport: Rugby union
- Instituted: 1987; 39 years ago (as London 2 South)
- Number of teams: 12
- Country: England
- Holders: Medway (1st title) (2024–25)
- Most titles: Basingstoke, Canterbury, Gravesend, Haywards Heath, Sutton & Epsom, Wimbledon, Camberley (2 titles)
- Website: englandrugby.com

Regional 2 South East, previously known as London 1 South, is an English level 6 rugby union regional league for rugby clubs in London and the south-east of England including sides from East Sussex, south Essex, south Greater London, Hampshire, Kent, Surrey and West Sussex. When this division began in 1987 it was known as London 2 South, changing to London 1 South ahead of the 2009–10 season. It used to be the feeder league for London & South East Premier into which the champions were promoted, while the second-placed team entered a play-off against the runner-up of London 1 North. Three teams were relegated into either London 2 South East and London 2 South West depending on their location. The league was renamed as Regional 2 South East for the 2022–23 season and moved from a 14 team, to a 12 team competition. The champions are promoted to either Regional 1 South Central or Regional 1 South East depending on geographical location, whiles relegated sides go to either Counties 1 Kent or Counties 1 Surrey/Sussex.

The winner of the league after the revamp was Horsham, whilst current champions are Medway.

== Structure and format ==
The twelve teams play home and away matches from September through to April, making a total of twenty-two matches each. The results of the matches contribute points to the league as follows:

- 4 points are awarded for a win
- 2 points are awarded for a draw
- 0 points are awarded for a loss, however
- 1 losing (bonus) point is awarded to a team that loses a match by 7 points or fewer
- 1 additional (bonus) point is awarded to a team scoring 4 tries or more in a match

There is one automatic promotion place and two relegation places. The first-placed team at the end of season wins promotion to either Regional 1 South Central or Regional 1 South East

== 2026-27 ==
Departing were Sidcup (champions) promoted to Regional 1 South East as were and Old Colfeians (5th) going up as play-off winners. Canterbury II (10th - playoff losers) and Old Reigatian (12th) were relegated to Counties 1 Kent and Counties 1 Surrey / Sussex respectively.

Team	Ground	Capacity	City/Area	Previous season
Battersea Ironsides	Burntwood Lane		Earlsfield, London	6th
Beckenham	Balmoral Avenue		Beckenham, London	8th
Brighton	Waterhall Playing Fields		Brighton, East Sussex	Runners-up
Bromley	Barnet Wood Road		Hayes, London	9th
Cobham	Old Surbitonians Memorial Ground		Cobham, Surrey	Promoted from Counties 1 Surrey / Sussex (champions)
Dartfordians	Bourne Road		Bexley, London	11th
Gravesend	Rectory Field		Gravesend, Kent	3rd
Hammersmith & Fulham	Hurlingham Park		Fulham, London	Relegated from Regional 1 South Central (11th)
Horsham	Coolhurst Ground		Horsham, West Sussex	4th
Medway	Priestfields		Rochester, Kent	Relegated from Regional 1 South East (11th)
Old Elthamians	Hospital Ground		Chislehurst, London	Promoted from Counties 1 Kent (champions)
Sutton & Epsom	Rugby Lane		Cheam, London	7th

Locations of the 2026-27 Regional 2 SE teams in Greater London
Locations of the 2026-27 Regional 2 SE teams in Surrey, East Sussex, Kent and West Sussex

== 2025–26 ==
Departing were Medway, promoted to Regional 1 South East while Thurrock were relegated to Counties 1 Essex. Also leaving were Reeds Weybridge (6th) and Old Tiffinians (7th) on a level transfer to Regional 2 South Central.

Team	Ground	Capacity	City/Area	Previous season
Battersea Ironsides	Burntwood Lane		Earlsfield, London	5th
Beckenham	Balmoral Avenue		Beckenham, London	2nd
Brighton	Waterhall Playing Fields		Brighton, East Sussex	Relegated from Regional 1 South Central (11th)
Bromley	Barnet Wood Road		Hayes, London	Promoted from Counties 1 Kent (2nd)
Canterbury II	Marine Travel Ground	1,500 (75 seats)	Canterbury, Kent	Promoted from Counties 1 Kent (champions)
Dartfordians	Bourne Road		Bexley, London	10th
Gravesend	Rectory Field		Gravesend, Kent	11th
Horsham	Coolhurst Ground		Horsham, West Sussex	Relegated from Regional 1 South Central (12th)
Old Colfeians	Horn Park		Lee, London	8th
Old Reigatian	Geoffrey Knight Fields		Reigate, Surrey	9th
Sidcup	Crescent Farm		Sidcup, Kent	3rd
Sutton & Epsom	Rugby Lane		Cheam, London	4th

Locations of the 2025–26 Regional 2 SE teams in Greater London
Locations of the 2025–26 Regional 2 SE teams in Surrey, East Sussex, Kent and West Sussex

=== League table ===
Regional 2 South East 2025–26
	Team	Played	Won	Drawn	Lost	Points for	Points against	Points diff	Try bonus	Loss bonus	Points
1	Sidcup (P)	22	19	0	3	767	377	390	17	2	95
2	Brighton	22	18	0	4	817	567	250	17	2	91
3	Gravesend	22	14	1	7	689	505	184	16	2	76
4	Horsham	22	13	2	7	770	620	150	16	3	75
5	Old Colfeians (P)	22	12	1	9	709	615	94	16	2	68
6	Battersea Ironsides	22	12	0	10	660	708	−48	15	2	65
7	Sutton & Epsom	22	9	0	13	652	594	58	16	6	58
8	Beckenham	22	10	0	12	666	545	121	12	5	57
9	Bromley	22	8	0	14	628	756	−128	17	5	54
10	Canterbury II (R)	22	8	0	14	532	705	−173	11	5	48
11	Dartfordians	22	6	0	16	594	846	−252	14	6	44
12	Old Reigatian (R)	22	1	0	21	369	1015	−646	6	3	13
If teams are level at any stage, tiebreakers are applied in the following order: 1. Number of matches won 2. Number of draws 3. Difference between points for and against 4. Total number of points for 5. Aggregate number of points scored in matches between tied teams 6. Number of matches won excluding the first match, then the second and so on until the tie is settled
Mint background is the promotion place. (1st); Green background are the promotion play-off places. (2nd–5th); Pink background are the relegation play-off places (10th–11th); Salmon background is the relegation place. (12th); Updated: 23 July 2026

== 2024–25 ==
Departing were Old Alleynians as champions, promoted to Regional 1 South Central while Cobham and London Cornish were relegated to Counties 1 Surrey/Sussex. Joining were Dartfordians, runners-up in Counties 1 Kent (Canterbury 2XV won the league but owing to league regulations were not permitted to be promoted to Level 6), Old Tiffinians runners up in Counties 1 Surrey/Sussex and Thurrock who were level transferred from Regional 2 Anglia.

Team	Ground	Capacity	City/Area	Previous season
Battersea Ironsides	Burntwood Lane		Earlsfield, London	2nd
Beckenham	Balmoral Avenue		Beckenham, London	6th
Dartfordians	Bourne Road		Bexley, London	Promoted from Counties 1 Kent (2nd)
Gravesend	Rectory Field		Gravesend, Kent	10th
Medway	Priestfields		Rochester, Kent	3rd
Old Colfeians	Horn Park		Lee, London	9th
Old Reigatian	Geoffrey Knight Fields		Reigate, Surrey	4th
Old Tiffinians	Grist's Memorial Ground		Thames Ditton, Surrey	Promoted from Counties 1 Surrey/Sussex (2nd)
Reeds Weybridge	Whiteley Village		Hersham, Surrey	7th
Sidcup	Crescent Farm		Sidcup, Kent	5th
Sutton & Epsom	Rugby Lane		Cheam, London	8th
Thurrock	Oakfield		Grays, Essex	Level transfer from Regional 2 Anglia (4th)

Locations of the 2024–25 Regional 2 SE teams in Greater London
Locations of the 2024–25 Regional 2 SE teams in Surrey, Essex & Kent

=== League table ===
Regional 2 South East 2024–25
	Team	Played	Won	Drawn	Lost	Points For	Points Against	Points Diff	Try bonus	Loss bonus	Points
1	Medway (P)	22	17	0	5	659	464	195	17	4	89
2	Beckenham	22	16	0	6	712	454	258	19	4	87
3	Sidcup	22	17	0	5	724	397	327	14	1	83
4	Sutton & Epsom	22	14	1	7	645	559	86	10	4	72
5	Battersea Ironsides	22	13	1	8	591	547	44	14	4	72
6	Reeds Weybridge	22	11	0	11	591	637	−46	12	6	62
7	Old Tiffinians	22	9	2	11	680	670	10	16	6	62
8	Old Colfeians	22	10	0	12	574	662	−88	12	3	55
9	Old Reigatian	22	8	1	13	531	639	−108	9	2	45
10	Dartfordians	22	7	0	15	499	717	−218	10	2	40
11	Gravesend	22	4	1	17	534	661	−127	11	10	39
12	Thurrock (R)	22	3	0	19	410	743	−333	6	3	21
If teams are level at any stage, tiebreakers are applied in the following order: 1. Number of matches won 2. Number of draws 3. Difference between points for and against 4. Total number of points for 5. Aggregate number of points scored in matches between tied teams 6. Number of matches won excluding the first match, then the second and so on until the tie is settled
Green background is the promotion place. Pink background are the relegation places. Updated: 1 September 2025; Source:

== 2023–24 ==
Departing were Horsham as champions, promoted to Regional 1 South Central. Also leaving the league were Farnham, Guildford and Chichester - all level transferred to Regional 2 South Central. Relegated were KCS Old Boys to Counties 1 Surrey/Sussex and Dartfordians to Counties 1 Kent respectively. Joining were Cobham and London Cornish on a level transfer from Regional 2 Thames, Old Alleynian came up from Counties 1 Kent while Medway and Sidcup and were relegated from Regional 1 South East as were Sutton & Epsom from Regional 1 South Central.

Team	Ground	Capacity	City/Area	Previous season
Battersea Ironsides	Burntwood Lane		Earlsfield, London	5th
Beckenham	Balmoral Avenue		Beckenham, London	10th
Cobham	Old Surbitonians Memorial Ground		Cobham, Surrey	Level transfer from Regional 2 Thames (3rd)
Gravesend	Rectory Field		Gravesend, Kent	6th
London Cornish	Richardson Evans Memorial Playing Fields		Roehampton Vale, London	Level transfer from Regional 2 Thames (6th)
Medway	Priestfields		Rochester, Kent	Relegated from Regional 1 SE (12th)
Old Alleynian	Dulwich Common		Dulwich, London	Promoted from Counties 1 Kent (champions)
Old Colfeians	Horn Park		Lee, London	7th
Old Reigatian	Geoffrey Knight Fields		Reigate, Surrey	4th
Reeds Weybridge	Whiteley Village		Hersham, Surrey	3rd
Sidcup	Crescent Farm		Sidcup, Kent	Relegated from Regional 1 SE (11th)
Sutton & Epsom	Rugby Lane		Cheam, London	Relegated from Regional 1 SC (12th)

Locations of the 2023–24 Regional 2 SE teams in Greater London
Locations of the 2023–24 Regional 2 SE teams in Surrey & Kent

=== League table ===
Regional 2 South East 2023–24
	Team	Played	Won	Drawn	Lost	Points For	Points Against	Points Diff	Try bonus	Loss bonus	Points	Adjust
C	Old Alleynians	22	16	0	6	793	454	+339	15	3	82	
2	Battersea Ironsides	22	16	0	6	655	456	+199	12	4	80	
3	Medway	22	14	0	8	591	541	+50	11	2	69	
4	Old Reigatian	22	13	0	9	626	627	-1	15	2	69	
5	Sidcup	22	12	0	10	584	516	+68	10	4	63	
6	Beckenham	22	11	0	11	610	618	-8	12	5	61	
7	Reeds Weybridge	22	13	0	9	547	419	128	8	5	60	-5
8	Sutton & Epsom	22	10	0	12	599	598	1	8	5	53	
9	Old Colfeians	22	9	0	13	517	601	−84	8	5	49	
10	Gravesend	22	7	0	15	484	579	−95	7	7	42	
R	Cobham	22	6	0	16	475	760	−285	9	3	36	
R	London Cornish	22	5	0	17	451	763	−312	6	3	29	
If teams are level at any stage, tiebreakers are applied in the following order: 1. Number of matches won 2. Number of draws 3. Difference between points for and against 4. Total number of points for 5. Aggregate number of points scored in matches between tied teams 6. Number of matches won excluding the first match, then the second and so on until the tie is settled
Green background is the promotion place. Pink background are the relegation places. Updated: 6 April 2024; Source:

== 2022–23 ==
This was the first season following the RFU Adult Competition Review. The league was substantially similar to London 1 South but was smaller as seven teams left but only six joined (14 teams reduced to 12) with Regional 2 Thames and Regional 2 South Central taking teams that historically would have played in London 1 South.

Departing were London Welsh and Camberley who were promoted to Regional 1 South Central and Medway, promoted to Regional 1 South East. Also leaving the league were Hammersmith & Fulham, London Cornish, Cobham and London Irish Wild Geese - all level transferred to Regional 2 Thames.

In their place came Old Colfeians, Beckenham, Gravesend and Dartfordians - the top four from London 2 South East alongside Old Reigatian and Reeds Weybridge from London 2 South West.

Team	Ground	Capacity	City/Area	Previous season
Battersea Ironsides	Burntwood Lane		Earlsfield, London	9th London 1 South
Beckenham	Balmoral Avenue		Beckenham, London	Promoted from L2SE (2nd)
Chichester	Oaklands Park		Chichester, West Sussex	10th London 1 South
Dartfordians	Bourne Road		Bexley, London	Promoted from L2SE (4th)
Farnham	Wilkinson Way		Farnham, Surrey	11th London 1 South
Gravesend	Rectory Field		Gravesend, Kent	Promoted from L2SE (3rd)
Guildford	Broadwater Sports Club		Farncombe, Surrey	5th London 1 South
Horsham	Coolhurst Ground		Horsham, West Sussex	6th London 1 South
KCS Old Boys	Dornan Fields		Motspur Park, London	8th London 1 South
Old Colfeians	Horn Park		Lee, London	Promoted from L2SE (champions)
Old Reigatian	Geoffrey Knight Fields		Reigate, Surrey	Promoted from L2SW (3rd)
Reeds Weybridge	Whiteley Village		Hersham, Surrey	Promoted from L2SW (2nd)

Locations of the 2022–23 Regional 2 South East teams
Locations of the 2022–23 Regional 2 South East teams in Surrey, Kent, Hampshire & West Sussex

=== League table ===
Regional 2 South East 2022–23
	Team	Played	Won	Drawn	Lost	Points For	Points Against	Points Diff	Try bonus	Loss bonus	Points	Adjust
C	Horsham	22	18	0	4	735	312	+423	17	2	91	
2	Farnham	22	17	0	5	486	431	+55	9	0	78	
3	Reeds Weybridge	22	14	0	8	559	490	+69	8	6	70	
4	Old Reigatian	22	12	1	9	617	583	+34	14	4	68	
5	Battersea Ironsides	22	12	1	9	635	505	+130	10	4	64	
6	Gravesend	22	12	0	10	447	490	-43	7	2	59	
7	Old Colfeians	22	10	1	11	473	517	-44	7	5	54	
8	Guildford	22	9	1	12	480	509	-29	10	7	50	-5
9	Chichester	22	8	0	14	510	560	−50	7	4	44	
10	Beckenham	22	7	0	15	429	489	−60	6	8	43	
R	Dartfordians	22	6	0	16	426	630	−204	10	9	43	
R	KCS Old Boys	22	5	0	17	324	605	−281	6	2	13	-15
If teams are level at any stage, tiebreakers are applied in the following order: 1. Number of matches won 2. Number of draws 3. Difference between points for and against 4. Total number of points for 5. Aggregate number of points scored in matches between tied teams 6. Number of matches won excluding the first match, then the second and so on until the tie is settled
Green background is the promotion place. Pink background are the relegation places. Updated: 6 April 2024; Source:

== 2021–22 ==
The teams competing in 2021–22 achieved their places in the league based on performances in 2019–20, the 'previous season' column in the table below refers to that season not 2020–21. Ahead of the season Haywards Heath (promoted as London 2 SE champions in 2019–20) withdrew from the league leaving London 1 South with thirteen teams.

Departing were Havant and Westcombe Park, promoted to L&SE Premier whilst H.A.C were relegated to London 2 North West as were Dartfordians and Beckenham to London 2 South East. Thurrock and Belsize Park were level transferred to London 1 North.

In their place came Battersea Ironsides and Farnham from London 2 South West, London Welsh and Hammersmith & Fulham from L2NW whilst Guildford and London Irish Wild Geese were relegated from L&SE Premier.

Team	Ground	Capacity	City/Area	Previous season
Battersea Ironsides	Burntwood Lane		Earlsfield, London	Promoted from L2SW (champions)
Camberley	Watchetts Recreation Ground		Camberley, Surrey	3rd
Chichester	Oaklands Park		Chichester, West Sussex	8th
Cobham	Old Surbitonians Memorial Ground		Cobham, Surrey	5th
Farnham	Wilkinson Way		Farnham, Surrey	Promoted from L2SW (2nd)
Guildford	Broadwater Sports Club		Farncombe, Surrey	Relegated from L&SE Premier (14th)
Hammersmith & Fulham	Hurlingham Park		Fulham, London	Promoted from L2NW (2nd)
Horsham	Coolhurst Ground		Horsham, West Sussex	7th
KCS Old Boys	Dornan Fields		Motspur Park, London	9th
London Cornish	Richardson Evans Memorial Playing Fields		Roehampton Vale, London	11th
London Irish Wild Geese	Hazelwood	2,000	Sunbury-on-Thames, Surrey	Relegated from L&SE Premier (12th)
London Welsh	Old Deer Park	5,850 (1,000 seats)	Richmond, London	Promoted from L2NW (champions)
Medway	Priestfields		Rochester, Kent	4th

Locations of the 2021–22 London 1 South teams in Greater London
Locations of the 2021–22 London 1 South teams in Surrey, Hampshire, Kent & West Sussex

== 2020–21 ==
On 30 October 2020 the RFU announced that due to the coronavirus pandemic a decision had been taken to cancel Adult Competitive Leagues (National League 1 and below) for the 2020–21 season meaning London 1 South was not contested.

== 2019–20 ==
Departing were Sevenoaks and Brighton, promoted to L&SE Premier whilst Chobham and Tottonians were relegated to London 2 South West and Hove to London 2 South East. In their place came Beckenham and Horsham from London 2 SE, Belsize Park from London 2 NW, KCS Old Boys from London 2 SW and H.A.C. on a level transfer from London 1 North

Team	Ground	Capacity	City/Area	Previous season
Beckenham	Balmoral Avenue		Beckenham, London	Promoted from London 2 SE (champions)
Belsize Park	Regent's Park		Belsize Park, London	Promoted from London 2 NW (champions) (Note: Likely level transfer from London 2 North West - this may change.)
Camberley	Watchetts Recreation Ground		Camberley, Surrey	3rd
Chichester	Oaklands Park		Chichester, West Sussex	9th
Cobham	Old Surbitonians Memorial Ground		Cobham, Surrey	10th
Dartfordians	Bourne Road		Bexley, London	11th
H.A.C.	Artillery Ground		Finsbury, London	Level transfer from London 1 North (5th) (Note: Likely level transfer from London 1 North - this may change.)
Havant	Hook's Lane	1,500 (500 seats)	Havant, Hampshire	6th
Horsham	Coolhurst Ground		Horsham, West Sussex	Promoted from London 2 SE (play-off)
KCS Old Boys	Dornan Fields		Motspur Park, London	Promoted from London 2 SW (champions)
London Cornish	Richardson Evans Memorial Playing Fields		Roehampton Vale, London	8th
Medway	Priestfields		Rochester, Kent	4th
Thurrock	Oakfield		Grays, Essex	5th
Westcombe Park	Goddington Dene	3,200 (200 seats)	Orpington, London	7th

Locations of the 2019–20 London 1 South teams in Greater London
Locations of the 2019–20 London 1 South teams in Surrey, Kent, Essex, Hampshire & West Sussex

== 2018–19 ==
Team	Ground	Capacity	City/Area	Previous season
Brighton	Waterhall Playing Fields		Brighton, East Sussex	6th
Camberley	Watchetts Recreation Ground		Camberley, Surrey	Promoted from London 2 SW (champions)
Chichester	Oaklands Park		Chichester, West Sussex	4th
Chobham	Fowlers Wells		Chobham, Surrey	10th
Cobham	Old Surbitonians Memorial Ground		Cobham, Surrey	5th
Dartfordians	Bourne Road		Bexley, London	Promoted from London 2 SE (champions)
Havant	Hook's Lane	1,500 (500 seats)	Havant, Hampshire	3rd
Hove	Hove Recreation Ground		Hove, East Sussex	Promoted from London 2 SE (play-off)
London Cornish	Richardson Evans Memorial Playing Fields		Roehampton Vale, London	8th
Medway	Priestfields		Rochester, Kent	2nd (lost play-off)
Sevenoaks	Knole Paddock	1,000	Sevenoaks, Kent	9th
Thurrock	Oakfield		Grays, Essex	11th
Tottonians	Water Lane		Totton, Hampshire	7th
Westcombe Park	Goddington Dene	3,200 (200 seats)	Orpington, London	Relegated from LSE Premier (12th)

Locations of the 2018–19 London 1 South teams in Greater London
Locations of the 2018–19 London 1 South teams in Surrey, Buckinghamshire & Hertfordshire

== 2017–18 ==
Team	Ground	Capacity	City/Area	Previous season
Brighton	Waterhall Playing Fields		Brighton, East Sussex	11th
Chichester	Oaklands Park		Chichester, West Sussex	Relegated from National League 3 London & SE (12th)
Chobham	Fowlers Wells		Chobham, Surrey	10th
Cobham	Old Surbitonians Memorial Ground		Cobham, Surrey	6th
CS Rugby 1863	King's House Sports Ground		Chiswick, London	5th
Gravesend	Rectory Field		Gravesend, Kent	8th
Havant	Hook's Lane	1,500 (500 seats)	Havant, Hampshire	3rd
London Cornish	Richardson Evans Memorial Playing Fields		Roehampton Vale, London	Promoted from London 2 South West (champions)
Maidstone	William Davey Memorial Ground	2,000 (100 seats)	Maidstone, Kent	9th
Medway	Priestfields		Rochester, Kent	Promoted from London 2 South East (champions)
Old Colfeians	Horn Park		Lee, London	Promoted from London 2 South East (play-off)
Sevenoaks	Knole Paddock	1,000	Sevenoaks, Kent	7th
Thurrock	Oakfield		Grays, Essex	Level transfer from London 1 North (6th)
Tottonians	Water Lane		Totton, Hampshire	4th

Locations of the 2017–18 London 1 South teams in Greater London
Locations of the 2017–18 London 1 South teams

== 2016–17 ==
Sutton & Epsom, they were promoted to National 3 London & South East for the 2016–17 season, while the second-placed team, Guildford beat Tring, the runner-up from London 1 North, in a play-off for the second promotion place. Twickenham and Charlton Park are relegated. Medway were also relegated despite finishing third due to an RFU punishment for incorrect registration of, and illegal payments to, players thus granting a reprieve from relegation for Gosport and Fareham.

Medway were replaced by Gravesend who were relegated from National 3 London & South East. Promoted into the league were winners of London 2 South East, Tunbridge Wells as well as Cobham as champions of London 2 South West and play-off winners Sevenoaks. CS Rugby 1863 were transferred from London 1 North as the most southerly team in that league due to an imbalance in North and South teams in the leagues.

Team	Ground	Capacity	City/Area	Previous season
Brighton	Waterhall		Brighton, East Sussex	5th
Chiswick	Dukes Meadows		Chiswick, Hounslow, London	10th
Chobham	Fowlers Wells		Chobham, Surrey	8th
Cobham	Old Surbitonians Memorial Ground		Cobham, Surrey	Promoted from London 2 South West as champions
CS Rugby 1863	King's House Sports Ground		Chiswick, London	Level transferred from London 1 North
Dover	Crabble Athletic Ground		Dover, Kent	11th
Gosport & Fareham	Gosport Park		Gosport, Hampshire	12th
Gravesend	Donald Biggs Drive		Gravesend, Kent	Relegated from National League 3 London & SE
Havant	Hook's Lane	1,500 (500 seats)	Havant, Hampshire	9th
Maidstone	William Day Memorial Ground	2,000 (100 seats)	Maidstone, Kent	6th
Sevenoaks	Knole Paddock	1,000	Sevenoaks, Kent	Promoted from London 2 South East via play-off
Sidcup	Crescent Farm		Sidcup, Kent	4th
Tottonians	Water Lane		Totton, Hampshire	7th
Tunbridge Wells	St Marks Recreation Ground	3,000	Royal Tunbridge Wells, Kent	Promoted from London 2 South East as champions

Locations of the 2016–17 London 1 South teams in Greater London
Locations of the 2016–17 London 1 South teams

== 2015–16 ==
Team	Ground	Capacity	City/Area	Previous season
Brighton	Waterhall		Brighton, East Sussex	6th
Charlton Park	Broad Walk	1,500 (300 seats)	Kidbrooke, London	8th
Chiswick	Dukes Meadows		Chiswick, London	Promoted from London 2 North West via play-off
Chobham	Fowlers Wells		Chobham, Surrey	2nd
Dover	Crabble Athletic Ground		Dover, Kent	10th
Gosport & Fareham	Gosport Park		Gosport, Hampshire	9th
Guildford	Broadwater Sports Club		Farncombe, Surrey	5th
Havant	Hook's Lane	1,500 (500 seats)	Havant, Hampshire	7th
Maidstone	William Davey Memorial Ground	2,000 (100 seats)	Maidstone, Kent	Promoted from London 2 South East as champions
Medway	Priestfields Recreation Ground		Rochester, Kent	Promoted from London 2 South East via play-off
Sidcup	Crescent Farm		Sidcup, Kent	4th
Sutton & Epsom	Rugby Lane		Cheam, London	3rd
Tottonians	Water Lane		Totton, Hampshire	Promoted from London 2 South West as champions
Twickenham	Parkfields		Hampton, London	11th

Locations of the 2015–16 London 1 South teams in Greater London
Locations of the 2015–16 London 1 South teams

=== Final league table ===
2015–16 London 1 South table
Pos	Team	Pld	W	D	L	PF	PA	PD	TB	LB	Pts	Qualification
1	Sutton & Epsom (C)	26	23	1	2	853	415	+438	17	1	112	Promotion place
2	Guildford (P)	26	20	0	6	802	481	+321	15	3	98	Play-off place
3	Medway (R) (Note: Despite finishing third in the league, Medway were relegated by the RFU to London 2 South East and banned from playing in the Kent County Cup after being found guilty of illegal payments to players and incorrect registration of players.)	26	19	0	7	710	494	+216	12	3	91	Relegated
4	Sidcup	26	18	1	7	735	477	+258	13	4	91	
5	Brighton	26	16	0	10	661	480	+181	13	7	84	
6	Maidstone	26	16	2	8	733	541	+192	11	1	80	
7	Tottonans	26	16	0	10	741	464	+277	12	3	79	
8	Chobham	26	13	0	13	720	598	+122	13	8	73	
9	Havant	26	12	0	14	724	688	+36	13	7	68	
10	Chiswick	26	10	1	15	496	707	−211	5	2	49	
11	Dover	26	6	0	20	425	748	−323	6	7	37	
12	Gosport & Fareham	26	5	0	21	458	959	−501	8	1	29	
13	Twickenham (R)	26	2	0	24	424	859	−435	7	6	21	Relegated
14	Charlton Park (R)	26	3	1	22	413	984	−571	2	4	20	Relegated

Updated to match(es) played on 12 June 2016. Source: 2014–15
Rules for classification: If teams are level at any stage, tiebreakers are applied in the following order:
1. Number of matches won
2. Difference between points for and against
3. Total number of points for
4. Aggregate number of points scored in matches between tied teams
5. Number of matches won excluding the first match, then the second and so on until the tie is settled
  Notes:

=== Promotion play-off ===
Each season, the runners-up in London 1 South and London 1 North participate in a play-off for promotion to National 3 London & SE. The team with the best playing record, in this case Tring, from London 1 North, was the home team and the away team Guildford, won the match 26 – 21, with a try in the 79th minute.

Team	Pld	W	D	L	PF	PA	PD	TB	LB	Pts
Tring	26	23	0	3	987	360	+627	17	0	109
Guildford (P)	26	20	0	6	802	481	+321	15	3	98

Updated to match(es) played on unknown. Source:

30 April 2016
15:00

Tring	21 – 26	Guildford
	Tring Rangers; Guildford

Pendley Sports Centre
Attendance: 700

== 2014–15 ==
- Basingstoke (relegated from National League 3 London & SE)
- Brighton
- Charlton Park (promoted from London 2 South East)
- Chobham
- Cobham
- Dover
- Gosport & Fareham (promoted from London 2 South West)
- Guildford
- Havant
- Hove
- Sidcup
- Sutton & Epsom
- Twickenham (promoted from London 2 North West (play-off winners))
- Wimbledon

== 2013–14 ==
- Beckenham
- Brighton (promoted from London 2 South East)
- Chichester
- Chobham (promoted from London 2 South West)
- Cobham
- Dover
- Gravesend
- Havant
- Haywards Heath
- Hove
- Sidcup
- Staines (relegated from National League 3 London & SE)
- Sutton & Epsom RFC (promoted from London 2 South West)
- Wimbledon RFC

== 2012–13 ==
- Basingstoke
- Beckenham
- Chichester
- Cobham
- Dover
- East Grinstead
- Gosport & Fareham
- Havant (relegated from National League 3 London & SE)
- Haywards Heath
- Hove
- Old Colfeians (transferred from London 1 North)
- Trojans
- Sidcup
- Sutton & Epsom RFC
- Wimbledon

== 2011–12 ==
- Basingstoke
- Beckenham
- Chichester
- Cobham
- Dover
- Guernsey
- Haywards Heath
- Hove
- Old Elthamians
- Portsmouth RFC
- Sidcup
- Sutton & Epsom RFC
- Thanet Wanderers
- Trojans RFC

== 2010–11 ==
- Beckenham
- Chichester
- Cobham
- Chobham
- Dover
- Haywards Heath
- Hove
- London Irish Wild Geese
- Portsmouth RFC
- Sutton & Epsom RFC
- Thanet Wanderers
- Tonbridge Juddians
- Tunbridge Wells
- Wimbledon

== 2009–10 ==
- Aylesford Bulls
- Beckenham
- Chichester
- Cobham
- Chobham
- Dover
- Gravesend
- Maidstone
- Old Colfeians
- Old Elthamians
- Sidcup
- Thanet Wanderers
- Tunbridge Wells
- Wimbledon

== Original teams ==
When league rugby began in 1987 this division (known as London 2 South) contained the following teams:

- Basingstoke
- Camberley
- Gravesend
- KCS Old Boys
- Old Alleynians
- Old Brockleians (Note: Currently known as Brockleians RFC.)
- Old Mid-Whitgiftian
- Old Reigatian
- Portsmouth
- Old Juddian (Note: In 1999 Old Juddian merged with Tonbridge to form Tonbridge Juddians.)
- Worthing

== Honours ==
=== London 2 South (1987–1993) ===
In the first season of the English rugby union league pyramid, sponsored by Courage, there was six, tier six leagues. The initial name was London 2 South and was for teams based in London and the counties of Hampshire, Kent, Surrey and Sussex. There was eleven teams in the league and each team played one match against each of the other teams, giving each team five home matches and five away matches. The winning team was awarded two points, and there was one point for each team in a drawn match.

The original London 2 South was a tier 6 league with promotion to London 1 and relegation to either London 3 South East or London 3 South West.

London 2 South
Season	No of teams	No of matches	Champions	Runners-up	Relegated teams	Reference
1987–88	11	10	Basingstoke	Old Mid-Whitgiftian	Old Juddian, Portsmouth	
1988–89	11	10	Old Alleynians	Worthing	Old Reigatian, KCS Old Boys, Purley	
1989–90	11	10	Old Mid-Whitgiftian	Camberley	Alton	
1990–91	11	10	Dorking	Westcombe Park	Old Brockleians, Dartfordians	
1991–92	11	10	Old Colfeians	Guildford & Godalming	Tunbridge Wells	
1992–93	13	12	Camberley	Westcombe Park	No relegation (Note: US Portsmouth finished in last place but there was no relegation due to a restructuring of the league system across all levels.)	

=== London 2 South (1993–1996) ===
At the end of the 1992–93 season the top six teams from London Division 1 and the top six from South West Division 1 were combined to create National 5 South. This meant that London 2 South dropped from a tier 6 league to a tier 7 league for the years that National 5 South was active. Promotion continued to London 1 and relegation to either London 3 South East or London 3 South West.

London 2 South
Season	No of teams	No of matches	Champions	Runners-up	Relegated teams	Reference
1993–94	13	12	Esher	Westcombe Park	KCS Old Boys, Worthing, Lewes	
1994–95	13	12	Charlton Park	Old Blues	Portsmouth, Old Alleynians, Sidcup	
1995–96	13	12	Wimbledon	Thanet Wanderers	Maidstone	

=== London 2 South (1996–2009) ===
The cancellation of National 5 South at the end of the 1995–96 season meant that London 2 South reverted to being a tier 6 league. Promotion continued to London 1 and relegation down to either London 3 South East or London 3 South West (renamed to London 2 South East and London 2 South West from the 2000–01 season onward).

London 2 South
Season	No of teams	No of matches	Champions	Runners-up	Relegated teams	Reference
1996–97	13	12	Thanet Wanderers	Gravesend	No relegation (Note: Brockleians finished in last place but there was no relegation this season.)	
1997–98	17	15	Westcombe Park	Winchester	Brockleians (Note: Brockleians dropped out with all results expunged.), Streatham-Croydon, Old Reigatian	
1998–99	15	14	Winchester	Sevenoaks	No relegation (Note: Askean finished in last place but there was no relegation due to expansion of league from 15 to 17 teams for the following season.)	
1999–00	17	16	Canterbury	Haywards Heath	Multiple teams (Note: Askean, Warlington, Dorking, Charlton Park, Lewes, Old Blues and Old Wimbledonians were the relegated teams this year. A restructuring of the league system including a reduction of this division from 17 teams to 12 resulting in more teams relegated than usual.)	
2000–01	12	22	Haywards Heath	Canterbury	Tonbridge Juddian, Alton, Old Guildfordians	
2001–02	12	22	Canterbury	Portsmouth	Gravesend, Guildford & Godalming	
2002–03	12	22	Worthing	Portsmouth	Sevenoaks, Effingham & Leatherhead, Maidstone	
2003–04	12	22	Richmond	Barnes	Cobham, Andover, Winchester	
2004–05	12	22	Barnes	Portsmouth	Camberley, Tunbridge Wells, Dartfordians	
2005–06	12	22	Portsmouth	Guildford	Old Mid-Whitgiftian, Sidcup, Gosport & Fareham	
2006–07	12	22	Sutton & Epsom	Thanet Wanderers	London Irish Amateur, Lewes, Andover	
2007–08	12	22	Haywards Heath	Jersey	Sevenoaks, Wimbledon, Guildford	
2008–09	12	22	Basingstoke	Dorking	No relegation (Note: Maidstone finished in last place but no relegation due to national restructuring of the league system leading to changes at all levels.)	

=== London 1 South ===
London 2 South was renamed to London 1 South from the 2009–10 season. It continued as a tier 6 league with promotion to National League 3 London & South East (formerly London 1 and currently known as London & South East Premier) and relegation to London 2 South East and London 2 South West (formerly London 3 South East and London 3 South West).

London 1 South
Season	No of teams	No of matches	Champions	Runners-up	Relegated teams	Reference
2009–10	14	26	Gravesend	Dover	Aylesford Bulls, Maidstone, Old Elthamians	
2010–11	14	26	Tonbridge Juddians	London Irish Amateur	Tunbridge Wells, Wimbledon	
2011–12	14	26	Guernsey	Old Elthamians	Sutton & Epsom, Thanet Wanderers, Portsmouth	
2012–13	14	26	East Grinstead	Basingstoke	Old Colfeians, Trojans, Gosport & Fareham	
2013–14	14	26	Gravesend	Chichester	Haywards Heath, Staines, Beckenham	
2014–15	14	26	Wimbledon	Chobham	Basingstoke, Hove, Cobham	
2015–16	14	26	Sutton & Epsom	Guildford	Charlton Park, Twickenham, Medway	
2016–17	14	26	Sidcup	Tunbridge Wells	Gosport and Fareham, Dover, Chiswick	
2017–18	14	26	CS Rugby 1863	Medway	Gravesend, Maidstone, Old Colfeians	
2018–19	14	26	Sevenoaks	Brighton	Hove, Chobham, Tottonians	
2019–20	14	22 (Note: Due to the COVID-19 pandemic in the United Kingdom the RFU cancelled all rugby below the Premiership with all clubs in London 1 South having played 22 games, and a best playing record formula was used to decide the final table.)	Havant	Westcombe Park	Beckenham, Dartfordians, H.A.C.	
2020–21	Cancelled due to COVID-19 pandemic in the United Kingdom.					
2021–22	13	24 (Note: Due to withdrawal of Haywards Heath the league was contested by 13 teams as opposed to 14)	Camberley	London Welsh, Medway	No relegation	
Green background are the promotion places.

== Regional 2 South East ==
Following a reorganisation of the league structure by the RFU, this league is now one of twelve at tier 6. Promotion is to Regional 1 South Central or Regional 1 South East, while relegation is to Counties 1 Essex, Counties 1 Kent or Counties 1 Surrey/Sussex.

Regional 2 South East
Season	No of teams	Champions	Runner-up	Relegated teams	Ref
2022–23	12	Horsham	Farnham	Dartfordians and KCS Old Boys	
2023–24	12	Old Alleynian	Battersea Ironsides	Cobham and London Cornish	
2024–25	12	Medway	Beckenham	Thurrock	
Green background is the promotion place.

== Promotion play-offs ==
From 2000–01 to 2018–19 there was a play-off between the runners-up of London 1 North and London 1 South for the third and final promotion place to London & South East Premier. The team with the superior league record had home advantage. At the end of the 2018–19 season the London 1 South teams have been the most successful with eleven wins to the London 1 North teams eight; and the home team has won promotion on thirteen occasions compared to the away teams six. Promotion play-offs ended with the reorganisation of the leagues for season 2022–23

London 1 (north v south) promotion play-off results
Season	Home team	Score	Away team	Venue	Attendance
2000–01	Canterbury (S)	21-27	London Nigerian (N)	Merton Lane, Canterbury, Kent	
2001–02	Southend (N)	37-15	Portsmouth (S)	Warners Bridge Park, Southend-on-Sea, Essex	
2002–03	Old Albanian (2nd XV) (N)	28-12	Portsmouth (S)	Woollam Playing Fields, St Albans, Hertfordshire	
2003–04	Cambridge (N)	21-19	Barnes (S)	Grantchester Road, Cambridge, Cambridgeshire	
2004–05	Staines (N)	55-12	Portsmouth (S)	The Reeves, Hanworth, Greater London	
2005–06	Guildford (S)	27-14	CS Rugby 1863 (N)	Broadwater Sports Club, Farncombe, Surrey	
2006–07	Tring (N)	7-20	Thanet Wanderers (S)	Cow Lane, Tring, Hertfordshire	
2007–08	Jersey (S)	15-0	Staines (S)	St. Peter, Saint Peter, Jersey	
2008–09	Staines (N)	7-11	Dorking (S)	The Reeves, Hanworth, Greater London	
2009–10	Civil Service (N)	31-14	Dover (S)	King's House Sports Ground, Chiswick, Greater London	
2010–11	London Irish Wild Geese (S)	21-14	Sidcup (N)	Hazelwood, Sunbury-on-Thames, Surrey	1,000
2011–12	Old Elthamians (S)	16-8	Colchester (N)	Foxbury Avenue, Chislehurst, Greater London	600
2012–13	Basingstoke (S)	27-3	Eton Manor (N)	Down Grange, Basingstoke, Hampshire	
2013–14	Chichester (S)	25-16	Eton Manor (N)	Oaklands Park, Chichester, West Sussex	
2014–15	Eton Manor (N)	17-14	Chobham (S)	The New Wilderness, Redbridge, London	400
2015–16	Tring (N)	21-26	Guildford (S)	Cow Lane, Tring, Hertfordshire	700
2016–17	Chingford (N)	33-35 (AET)	Tunbridge Wells (S)	Lea Valley Playing Fields, Chingford, London	500
2017–18	Chingford (N)	21-17	Medway (S)	Lea Valley Playing Fields, Chingford, London	500
2018–19	Colchester (N)	26-33	Brighton (S)	Mill Road Playing Fields, Colchester, Essex	
2019–20	Cancelled due to COVID-19 pandemic in the United Kingdom. Best ranked runner up - Westcombe Park (S) - promoted instead.				
2021–22	Not contested due to a restructuring of the league system including a reduction of this division from 14 to 12 under the RFU Adult Competition Review.				
Green background is the promoted team. N = London 1 North (formerly London 2 North) and S = London 1 South (formerly London 2 South).

== Number of league titles ==
- Basingstoke (2)
- Canterbury (2)
- Gravesend (2)
- Haywards Heath (2)
- Sutton & Epsom (2)
- Wimbledon (2)
- Camberley (2)
- Barnes (1)
- Charlton Park (1)
- CS Rugby 1863 (1)
- Dorking (1)
- East Grinstead (1)
- Esher (1)
- Guernsey (1)
- Havant (1)
- Horsham (1)
- Medway
- Old Alleynian (1)
- Old Colfeians (1)
- Old Mid-Whitgiftian (1)
- Portsmouth (1)
- Richmond (1)
- Sevenoaks (1)
- Sidcup (1)
- Thanet Wanderers (1)
- Tonbridge Juddians (1)
- Westcombe Park (1)
- Winchester (1)
- Worthing (1)

== See also ==
- London & SE Division RFU
- Hampshire RFU
- Kent RFU
- Surrey RFU
- Sussex RFU
- English rugby union system
- Rugby union in England
