= Kent Rugby Football Union =

(England) Kent RFU
- Full name: Kent Rugby Football Union
- Union: RFU
- Founded: 1880; 146 years ago
- Region: Kent, parts of London
- Chairman: Roger Clarke
- President: John Nunn
Team kit

Official website
- www.kent-rugby.org

The Kent Rugby Football Union is the governing body for the sport of rugby union in the county of Kent in England. The union is the constituent body of the Rugby Football Union (RFU) for Kent, and administers and organises rugby union clubs and competitions in the county. It also administers the Kent county rugby representative teams.

== History ==
One of the oldest unions in the country, the Kent Rugby Football Union was founded in 1880. In 1891, the Kent RFU created the Kent Cup as a county-wide competition for their members, one of the first few county cups established in England and the second in southern England after the Hampshire Rugby Football Union. They have a rich history in the men's senior County Championship since the early years of the competition, finishing as one of the regional winners in 1892, and becoming outright winners for the first time in 1897. They have gone on to win the top flight competition several more times, most recently in 2023.

In 2010, the Kent RFU was brought to national attention following an incident in a Kent Cup match between Maidstone and Gravesend where a Gravesend player was blinded in one eye as a result of eye-gouging. Despite a statement from the County Chairman that there would be a long ban for the perpetrator, there were no charges from either the Kent RFU, The RFU or Kent Police due to lack of evidence available. As a result, instead, Maidstone were fined £2,000 and deducted 50 league points for failing to identify the player.

In modern times Kent have yo-yoed between Division 1 and Division 2 of the championships, with the most recent silverware claimed being the 2014 Plate when the defeated Durham 30–23 at Twickenham Stadium. They also run regular county tours overseas including to New Zealand in 2012 and to Argentina in 2016.

== Kent senior men's county side ==
Kent senior men's county side currently play in the Bill Beaumont Division 1 South – the top level of the County Championships, having been promoted despite losing 33–27 to East Midlands in the 2016 Plate final.

Honours:

- County Championship winners (5): 1897, 1904, 1927, 2023, 2024
- County Championship Plate winners (2): 2010, 2014

== Affiliated clubs ==
There are currently 56 clubs affiliated with the Kent RFU, most of which have teams at both senior and junior level. The majority of clubs are based in Kent, but there are also clubs from south-east London and even East Sussex.

- Ash
- Ashford
- Askeans
- Aylesford Bulls
- Badgers RFC
- Beccehamian
- Beckenham
- Bexley
- Blackheath (Note: Blackheath are joint members of both the Kent RFU and Middlesex RFU.)
- Brockleians
- Bromley
- Canterbury
- Charlton Park
- Cranbrook
- Dartford Valley
- Dartfordians
- Deal & Betteshanger
- Dover
- Edenbridge
- Erith
- Faversham
- Folkestone
- Footscray (Note: Footscray are joint members of both the Kent RFU and Middlesex RFU.)
- Gillingham Anchorians
- Gravesend
- Greenwich
- Guy's Hospital
- Hastings & Bexhill (Note: Hastings & Bexhill play in the Kent regional leagues but are members of the Sussex RFU.)
- HSBC
- King's College Hospital
- Lordswood
- Maidstone
- Medway
- New Ash Green
- Old Colfeians (Note: Old Colfeians are joint members of both the Kent RFU and Middlesex RFU.)
- Old Dunstonian
- Old Elthamians
- Old Gravesendians
- Old Williamsonians
- Orpington
- Park House
- Royal Bank of Scotland
- Sevenoaks
- Sheppey
- Shooters Hill
- Sidcup
- Sittingbourne
- Snowdown Colliery
- Southwark Lancers (Note: Southwark Lancers are joint members of both the Kent RFU and Middlesex RFU.)
- Thanet Wanderers
- Tonbridge Juddians
- Tunbridge Wells
- Vigo
- Weavering Warriors
- Westcombe Park
- Whitstable

== County club competitions ==
The Kent RFU currently runs the following competitions for club sides based in Kent and parts of south-east London, which they also administer discipline for:

=== Leagues ===
- Shepherd Neame Kent 1 – a league ranked at tier 9 of English rugby union league system
- Shepherd Neame Kent 2 – tier 10 league

=== Cups ===
- Kent Cup – founded in 1970, for club sides at tiers 5–6 of the English rugby union system as well as 2nd teams for local clubs in higher divisions (tiers 3–4)
- Kent Shield – founded in 2015, for club sides at tiers 7–8
- Kent Vase – founded in 2001, for club sides at tiers 9–10
- Kent Plate – founded in 1993, for club sides knocked out of the first round of the Kent Cup and Kent Shield
- Kent Salver – founded in 2005, for club sides knocked out of the first round of the Kent Vase

=== Discontinued competitions ===
- Kent 3 – tier 11 league, cancelled in 2008
- Kent 4 – tier 12 league, cancelled in 2001
