= Matthew Cook (rugby union) =

Matt Cook
- Born: Matthew James Cook; 17 May 1978 (age 48) Saint Helier, Jersey
- Height: 6 ft 4 in (1.93 m)
- Weight: 244 lb (111 kg)
- School: De La Salle College
- University: Northampton University

Rugby union career
- Position(s): Head Coach; 2nd Row, Flanker, Number 8
- Current team: Tunbridge Wells RFC
Youth career
- Jersey RFC
Senior career
Years	Team	Apps	(Points)
1994-1997	Jersey RFC		
1997-1998	Saracens RFC		
1998–2002	Bedford	1	(10)
2002-2003	Carlow		
2003–2004	Blaydon RFC		
2004-2006	Denia		
2006–2013	La Vila		
2013–2014	Tunbridge Wells RFC		
2014-2015	East Grinstead RFC		
2015-	Tunbridge Wells RFC		
International career
Years	Team	Apps	(Points)
2010–2014	Spain	27	(15)

Matthew "Matt" James Cook (born 17 May 1978) is a Jersey-born Spanish international rugby union player. He plays as a Flanker or a Number 8. Cook currently plays for Tunbridge Wells RFC and the Spain national rugby union team.

== Personal life ==
Born in Saint Helier, Cook was educated at De La Salle College.

== Career ==
Cook started to play rugby at the age of 6 for Jersey. In 1998 he moved from Jersey to England and signed for Bedford Blues where he made his debut in the English Premiership on his 21st birthday against Richmond RFC. In that match he scored two tries. This was his only senior game for Bedford Blues. He was later released by Bedford Blues and attempted to find another Premiership club. In 2003, he was signed by Blaydon RFC. When he was unable to join another Premiership club, he retired from rugby.

In 2005, Cook moved to Villajoyosa, Spain and came out of retirement to sign for CR La Vila. In 2009, he was selected to play for Olympus Rugby XV Madrid in the European Challenge Cup. In 2013, Cook played for English amateur side, Tunbridge Wells RFC.

=== International career ===
In 2009, Cook was invited by the Spanish national team to join them in training camps. In 2010, Cook qualified to play for Spain under residency rules as he had lived in Spain for 5 years. He made his debut in a 2011 Rugby World Cup qualifier against Russia national rugby union team at Estadio Nacional Complutense in Madrid. This made him the second Jersey born player to win an international cap after Matt Banahan was called up to the England national rugby union team.
