= King's College Hospital RFC =

English rugby union club, based in Dulwich, London

King's College Hospital
- Full name: King's College Hospital Rugby Football Club
- Union: Kent RFU
- Nickname: King's
- Founded: 1869; 157 years ago.
- Location: Dulwich, Southwark, London, England
- Ground: Dulwich Sports Ground
- Chairman: Jack McAvoy
- Coach: Jac Welsh
- Captain: James Johnson
- League: Kent 1
- 2024-25: 10th
Team kit

Official website
- kchrfc.co.uk

King's College Hospital RFC is an open rugby union club founded in the 19th century as a football club whose representatives were made up of medics from King's College Hospital. In its original form it was one of the twenty-one founding members of the Rugby Football Union, and produced a number of international players in the sport's early international fixtures. The merging of King's College Hospital medical department in 1999 with the already merged Guy's Hospital and St Thomas' Hospital led to the creation of Guy's, King's and St Thomas' Rugby Football Club, an amalgam of three formerly distinct hospital rugby clubs each with a long history. King's College Hospital Rugby Football Club opted to remain a separate entity in so doing became an open rugby club that no longer represented the Hospital medics.

== History ==
In 1869, 90 members from King's College formed a football club representing faculties including the Medical Department. The club played football using a modified form of the Rugby School code. On 26 January 1871, they sent representation in the form of CM Madden and CE Pope to a meeting of twenty-one London and suburban football clubs that followed Rugby School rules assembled at the Pall Mall Restaurant in Regent Street. E.C. Holmes, captain of the Richmond Club assumed the presidency. It was resolved unanimously that the formation of a Rugby Football Society was desirable and thus the Rugby Football Union was formed. A president, a secretary and treasurer, and a committee of thirteen were elected, to whom was entrusted the drawing-up of the laws of the game upon the basis of the code in use at Rugby School. Although King's College was considered prominent enough to have been invited, they did not gain any of the thirteen places on the original committee.

The team entered the Inter-Hospital Challenge Cup (aka the United Hospitals Challenge Cup) from 1874. The team played in every competition until they became an open club in the mid-1990s, and although they reached the final four times, they never once lifted the trophy. The club's move away from its direct association with the Hospital means that it is no longer eligible to enter the tournament.

The early twentieth century saw the club in a period of demise. A report from the 1903 season goes towards explaining why the club found itself in that predicament:

"This season, more than ever before, the difficulty in raising teams is overwhelming. Richmond Club claims our heavy forwards and our best half, hospital duties seem to claim others, whilst general slackness and old age appear to render others a suitable excuse for not playing."

It appears that such was the nadir the club was in at this time that it was no longer recognised by the Rugby Football Union, the organisation it had been a founding member of. In 1920 a concerted effort was made to resurrect the club, to dispel the 'appalling apathy displayed by so many. The effects of the rejuvenation began with KCH being recognised by the Union in 1921. In 1924 they won 10 of 13 games and reached the final rounds of the Hospital Cup, a feat which was almost repeated the following season when King's fell in the semi-final to Guy's Hospital. King's found themselves in the finals of 1926 and 1929 where Guy's were victorious, and in the final of 1935 they lost to St. Mary's.

During the 1920s and 1930s a number of international players played for King's among them being the England and 1924 British Lions captain, Dr Ron Cove-Smith, as well as the 1927 British Lions captain and Scotland International Dr D J Macmyn (who later became President of the Scottish Rugby Union). W R F Collis of Ireland was another international capped player.

The 1940s, '50s and '60s were undistinguished for the club and it is notable that a single victory in the 1965 Hospital's Cup championship match was the first in seven seasons. The 1970s saw some improvement with a 1971 playing record of played 35, Won 25 and a narrow defeat to Bart's Hospital in the Semi-final of the Cup. In 1976 as the Club won 27 out of a possible 38. In 1975 the clubhouse on Dog Kennel Hill was lost to fire having stood since 1921. New facilities were built and the club continued to play on Dog Kennel Hill until 1990. Between 1990 and 2012, King's played their homes games at the Griffin Sports Club on Dulwich Village. In the summer of 2012, coinciding with their promotion to the Kent 1 RFU league, King's moved to their new home at the Dulwich Sports Ground in Turney Road, Dulwich.

In 1999, Guy's, King's and St Thomas' Medical Departments merged to become one and so too did the Rugby teams that represented their respective medics. King's College Hospital Rugby Football Club opted to remain a separate entity in so doing became an open rugby club that no longer represented the Hospital medics. In so doing they maintained their status as one of the oldest clubs in the World. The early years of the new millennium have seen success in the merit leagues and an invitation to compete in Kent Rugby's leagues. As of 2023 Byron Crofton holds the record for try scoring, drop goals and most appearances. In the 2011/12 season King's obtained promotion to the Kent 1 RFU league.

== International players ==
- England - W. J. Penny (1878)
- England - Ronald Cove-Smith (1921–29) also British Lion
- Scotland - D J MacMyn (1925–28) also British Lion
- Ireland - W R F Collis (1924–1926)

== Club honours ==
- Surrey 4 champions: 1995–96
- Kent 2 champions: 2011–12
- Kent Salver champions: 2025-26
