= Cranbrook RFC =

English rugby union club, based in Cranbrook, Kent

(England) Cranbrook RFC
- Full name: Cranbrook Rugby Football Club
- Union: Kent RFU
- Founded: 1958; 68 years ago
- Location: Cranbrook, Kent, England
- Ground: Tomlin Ground
- League: Counties 1 Kent
- 2024–25: 11th

Cranbrook Rugby Football Club is an English rugby union club in Cranbrook, Kent, England. They were founded in 1958 and play in London 3 South East having recently been promoted as runners up from Kent 1.

== History ==
Though rugby had been recorded as being played in Cranbrook in the 1930s, Cranbrook RFC in their current form were founded in 1958. They were founded by Mike McMinnies after taking part in a rugby match between students of Cranbrook School and some former Cranbrook School pupils in 1957. The club play at the Tomlin Ground which was planned to undergo a £1.69 million redevelopment in 2019.

Cranbrook won the Kent Vase in 2014 and retained it the next year. In 2019, Cranbrook hosted a training camp run by Premiership Rugby team Harlequins. This was subject to a mistaken report issued by the Midweek Herald newspaper which mistakenly claimed it was being run in Cranbrook, Devon, some 200 miles (320 km) away, rather than at Cranbrook RFC. During the 2019–20 season, the club reached the regional final of the RFU Junior Vase but lost to Hendon at the home of Premiership Saracens, Allianz Park. In the league, they won promotion from Shepherd Neame Kent 1 to London 3 South East after the COVID-19 pandemic in the United Kingdom cancelled the season but Cranbrook earned promotion under the Rugby Football Union's best playing record formula.

=== International players ===
Ruaridh McConnochie started his career with Cranbrook before representing the England and Great Britain national rugby sevens teams and later the England national rugby union team. Nathan Earle also played for Cranbrook before joining Saracens and playing for England.

== Honours ==
- Kent 3 champions: 1992–93
- Kent 1 champions (2): 1996–97, 2013–14
- Kent Salver winners: 2011–12
- Kent Vase winners (2): 2013–14, 2014–15
