= Maidstone FC =

English rugby union club, based in Maidstone, Kent

(England) Maidstone Football Club
- Full name: Maidstone Football Club
- Union: Kent RFU
- Nickname: Stones
- Founded: 1880; 146 years ago
- Location: Maidstone, Kent, England
- Ground: William Davey Memorial Ground - The Mote (Capacity: 2,000 (100 seats))
- Chairman: Trevor Marvin
- President: Richard Gray
- Coach: David Charlton
- Captain: Will Fox (club)
- League: Counties 2 Kent
- 2024-25: 10
Team kit

Official website
- www.maidstone-rugby.co.uk

Maidstone Football Club is an English rugby union club based in Maidstone, Kent. The men's first XV currently compete in Counties 2 Kent - a league at the eighth tier of the English rugby union system. The club has thriving mini and youth sections, with enjoyment and development a priority. There are three men's senior teams, catering for all ages and abilities, along with a senior women's team.

== History ==
One of the oldest rugby clubs in the country, the club was formed in 1880, and originally played at a ground close to the centre of the town owned by a Dr. Monckton. The club faced many strong teams from 1886 onwards, such as Middlesex Wanderers, Harlequin F.C., Richmond, Eton House, London Scottish and Old Merchant Taylors' FC. Within this period they found a surge of numbers in players who had formerly been pupils of Maidstone Grammar School. The club moved to The Mote in the early 1950s and have played there ever since. During the 1970s and 80s, Maidstone had become one of the premier clubs in Kent and reached the finals of the county cup for seven years running between 1974 and 1980, winning twice and once again in 1987. During the 1970s, they reached the finals of the Middlesex Sevens at Twickenham three times in four years and in 1980 were the only junior club to be invited to play in the London Senior Clubs Rugby Festival at Twickenham. Alongside Scottish club Heriot’s FP, Lansdowne from Ireland and French Champions Bagneres, the club reached the semi-finals where they were beaten 6–0 by London Scottish.

== League history ==
At the formation of the leagues in 1987, Maidstone were unanimously voted by the seven counties of the London Division to go straight into National League Three, along with the Metropolitan Police. After six seasons in the national leagues until 1993, the club suffered four relegations in four seasons and arrived in London 1 in 1996. At this point the committee took the decision to appoint a Director of Rugby and new management and coaching structure, the slump was stopped. Promotion was achieved within three seasons and in 2000, the final of the Kent Cup was lost in the dying moments to National League side, Westcombe Park. In 2003, they were relegated to London 2, but were promoted back to London 2 as unbeaten champions in 2005.

During a match against Gravesend R.F.C. on 17 January 2010, a Maidstone player allegedly gouged (although this was never proven) Gravesend player, Fergus Haggart. After a Rugby Football Union hearing on 12 January 2011, the club were fined £2000 and found Maidstone guilty of "conduct prejudicial to the interests of the game". They were also docked 50 points, and while the hearing judged the gouging was a deliberate action, they were unable to identify the guilty player. The club accepted the RFU's decision. Moving forward, the club looked to rebuild after a turbulent couple of seasons. After finishing fourth in London 3 in the 2011–12 season several changes have been made at the club. Their long term aim being to return to London 1 rugby within the next few seasons. The 2012–13 season was an incredibly successful one for Maidstone. They won London 3 SE with five games spare and ended undefeated in the league. This saw them return to London and SE 2 for the 2013–14 season. In their first season back at level 7, the club finished a strong second place behind leaders Charlton Park. Maidstone lost the promotion play-off to Gosport and Fareham, who they had beaten eight months before in a pre-season friendly.

For the 14-15 season, wholesale changes were made both on and off the pitch for a variety of reasons. The restructure has led to one of the best league seasons in the club's history. The first team went undefeated, only missing out on a perfect season with a draw against second placed Medway. The club was promoted back to London One South after a lengthy absence and finished a credible sixth in the 15-16 season. The club finished ninth in the 2016-17 season.

== Recent cup history ==
The club has had relative success in the past four years in various cup competitions. In 2011–12, the club reached the national semi-final of the RFU Senior Vase but lost to eventual winners Wells RFC.

The club again reached the semi-final stage in 2012–13 and were very confident in going one step further and making amends for the previous season. However, despite the home draw Maidstone missed out again and went down narrowly to Drybrook RFC. In the 2013–14 season, Maidstone traveled to Blackheath RFC in the semi-final of the Kent Cup. Despite the difference in leagues, Maidstone pushed the national one team all the way, eventually losing by a single point.

The club has had success in cup competitions during the 2014–15 season. In the Kent cup quarter-final Maidstone beat national three side Wescombe Park to set up a clash with Old Elthamians. However, due to a fixture clash, the club had to withdraw from the cup. Maidstone then competed in the RFU Intermediate Cup. The team reached the semi-finals after winning matches against Harrow, Medway, Diss, and Chiswick. They will play against Coney Hill RFC, a team based in Gloucester.

The club which previously lost, put on a winning performance to win 44–13 and booked their place at the Twickenham Final against Bridgnorth RFC. The final, held at Twickenham Stadium on Sunday 3 May. 7000 supporters travelled to the home of England Rugby to watch Maidstone against Bridgnorth for 31–18, winning RFU Intermediate Cup and round off the season.

For the 15-16 season, Maidstone lifted the Kent Plate after games against Tonbridge Juddians and Dartfordians. After going out of the Kent Cup to National 1 side Blackheath, Maidstone retained the Kent Plate by beating old rivals Aylesford Bulls in the final.

== Honours ==
- Kent Cup winners (3): 1974, 1979, 1987
- London 2 South East champions: (3): 1998–99, 2004–05, 2014–15
- London 3 South East champions: 2012–13
- RFU Intermediate Cup winners: 2015
- Kent Plate winners (2): 2016, 2017,2029

== Former players ==
List of former players who have gone onto represent professional clubs.

- (England) Piers Francis. Auckland, Waikato, Edinburgh, Doncaster Knights, Counties Manukau, Blues (Super Rugby), Northampton Saints
- (England) Daniel Caprice. Saracens, Blackheath, Biarritz, Northland, London Welsh
- David Flatman. Saracens, Bath, England
- (England) Harvey Beaton. Saracens,
