= Roger Clarke (rugby union administrator) =

- Education: The Skinners' School; University of Cambridge

Roger Clarke is a rugby union administrator from Royal Tunbridge Wells, Kent, England.

== Personal life ==
Clarke was educated at Royal Tunbridge Wells Grammar school, The Skinners' School where he also played rugby union for the school. Clarke then went on the University of Cambridge, whom he also played rugby for, where he graduated with a geography degree.

== Professional career ==
Clarke then became a geography teacher until, after taking government-recommended experience in industry, he left teaching to work in various trade federations and dairy companies before becoming the chief executive of the National Federation of Retail Newsagents. As chief executive, he modernised the National Federation of Retail Newsagents by founding their commercial section and creating a symbol group for them called Quix.

== Rugby administration ==
Clarke is the current chairman of Tunbridge Wells Rugby Football Club. He is also chairman of the Kent Rugby Football Union. In 2013, after responding to an advert in the Daily Telegraph, Clarke was appointed by the Rugby Football Union's chairman Bill Beaumont to become the chairman of "Area 3" (encompassing the counties of Kent, Sussex, Surrey and Essex) which would develop a legacy plan as part of the Rugby Football Union's intent to develop the sport of rugby union in the wake of the 2015 Rugby World Cup due to be held in England. Clarke was appointed alongside former players of the England national rugby union team and the British and Irish Lions, Fran Cotton and Peter Wheeler. In 2013, Clarke said that he would like to see some of the legacy money invested in grassroots rugby facilities.
