= Thanet Wanderers =

English rugby union club, based in Broadstairs, Kent

(England) Thanet Wanderers
- Full name: Thanet Wanderers Rugby Union Football Club
- Union: Kent RFU
- Founded: 1886; 140 years ago
- Location: Broadstairs, Kent, Thanet England
- Ground: St Peter's Recreation Ground
- Chairman: Chris Panteli
- President: Colin Whiteley
- Director of Rugby: Neil Roby
- Coach: Mike Pond
- League: Counties 2 Kent

Official website
- www.thanetwanderers.co.uk

Thanet Wanderers RUFC is a rugby union sports club founded in 1886 in Broadstairs. They currently play in Counties 2 Kent. The club runs 4 senior teams (one being veterans) plus a junior section for boys and girls.

== Honors ==
- Kent 1 champions: 1990–91
- London 2 South champions: 1996–97
- RFU Intermediate Cup Winners: 1996-97
- Kent Cup winners: 2000–01
- Kent Plate winners (2): 2003–04, 2010–11
- London 3 South East champions: 2013–14
