= Old Colfeians =

English rugby union club, based in Lewisham, London

- Full name: Old Colfeians Rugby Football Club
- Founded: 1928; 98 years ago
- Location: Lee, Lewisham, London, England
- Ground: Horn Park
- Chairman: Rob Gardiner
- President: John Nunn
- Coach(es): Alan Bateson, Tom Chapman
- Captain: Andrew O'Malley
- League: Regional 2 South East
- 2025–26: 5th (promoted to Regional 1 South East, via the play-offs)

Official website
- www.ocrfc.co.uk/club/

Old Colfeians Rugby Football Club is an English rugby union team based in Lee in south London. The club runs three senior teams and a veterans side and a full range of junior and girls teams, each of which have their own name. The first XV play in Regional 1 South East, having been promoted from Regional 2 South East at the end of the 2025–26 season.

== History ==
Old Colfeians was formed in 1928 but the club traces its routes back to 1885 when a club for the former pupils of Colfe's School got together to play rugby. For the next 60 years, Old Colfeians mostly played non-competitive matches against local rugby clubs. This ended when league rugby began in 1987 when the club was originally placed in London 3 South East and were promoted to London 2 South in 1989 and then, two years later were promoted to London 1 as champions. In 2000 the club gained another promotion and moved into National League 3 South, the fourth tier of English rugby, and remained there for three seasons. The club was relegated in 2004 and again in 2009 and they currently play in the London 2 South East league.

Old Colfeians also played in the EDF National Trophy However, in 2008 they were eliminated in the first round by the Tribute Western Counties West team, the Wadebridge Camels from Cornwall.

=== Clubhouse ===
Old Colfeians' ground contains a clubhouse with a war memorial with the names of former players and pupils of Colfe's School who had died in the First and Second World Wars inside it. The clubhouse is also used by Colfe's School as the location of their annual remembrance service.

== Honours ==
- London 3 South East champions: 1988–89
- London 2 South champions: 1991–92
- London Division 1 champions: 2000–01
- London 2 (south-east v south-west) promotion play-off winner: 2016–17
- London 2 South East champions: 2021–22
- Regional 2 South East champions: 2025–26
- Kent Cup winners (2): 1992, 1994
- Kent Shield winners: 2022
- Kent Plate winners: 1997
