= Beckenham RFC =

English rugby union club, based in Beckenham, Kent

(England) Beckenham RFC
- Full name: Beckenham Rugby Union Football Club
- Union: Kent RFU
- Founded: 19 October 1894; 132 years ago
- Location: Beckenham, Kent, England
- Ground(s): Balmoral Avenue, Beckenham, Kent, BR3 3RD
- Chairman: John Eaton
- President: Howard Roadnight
- Coach: Dan Brown
- Captain: Richard Keefe
- League: Regional 2 South East
- 2024–25: 2nd
Team kit

Official website
- www.beckenhamrfc.com

Beckenham Rugby Football Club is a rugby union club in Beckenham in South East London. The club was founded in 1894.

The men's first XV competes in Regional 2 South East – a league at the sixth tier of the English rugby union system – after gaining promotion as winners of the London 2 South East at the end of the 2021–22 season.

The Ladies first XV competes in the Women's Championship South 1 – a league at the second tier of the Women's English rugby union system after winning their league and promotion in the 2021–22 season. The Ladies 2nd XV competes in the Women's Challenge 2 South East (Central) league for the 2022–23 season.

The club has an active and supportive mini and youth section with teams for boys and girls from age 3 to 18 and encompasses over 700 young players.

== Players ==
England and British and Irish Lions full back Elliot Daly started his rugby journey with Beckenham RFC. Academy coach Phil Davies and Beckenham player Lamarr Sinclair took charge of Jamaica RFU U19s in the 2022 Americas North U19 Championship in Jamaica. Beckenham players have been called up. Ben Hatfield was awarded "Most Valuable Player" by the USA Head Coach in the final.

== Honours ==
=== Men ===
- London 2 South East winners (2): 1995–96, 2018–19
- Kent Plate winners (3): 2006, 2007, 2010

=== Ladies ===
- Women's Championship South East 2 winners: 2021–22
