= Charlton Park RFC =

English rugby union club

(England) Charlton Park
- Full name: Charlton Park Rugby Football Club
- Union: Kent RFU
- Founded: 1893; 133 years ago
- Location: Kidbrooke, Greenwich, London, England
- Ground: Broad Walk (Capacity: 1,500 (300 seats) (Note: Capacity from when Askeans RFC were based at the ground.))
- League: Counties 1 Kent
- 2024–25: 12th
Team kit

Official website
- www.charltonpark.org.uk

Charlton Park Rugby Football Club, based at Broad Walk in Kidbrooke, are one of south east London's most prominent rugby union clubs. Founded in 1893, the club plays in red and white hoops.

Despite appearing in many finals (the first in 1906), Charlton Park have never won the Kent Cup. The club's greatest success saw promotion to National League Three South alongside established national league sides such as Weston Super Mare, Newbury R.F.C., Plymouth Albion and Worcester Rugby (who have since spent several seasons in the Aviva Premiership) in 1996. The first XV were promoted to London 1 South following promotion in 2014 and relegated after two seasons there.

The club runs five senior sides (including a veterans' team), and have an increasingly strong junior set up. The second XV compete in the Kent Metropolitan Premier League, the third XV in the Kent Met Bishop's Finger League and the fourth XV (known as the Fuffs) in the Kent Met Conference League. The veterans XV compete in the annual Evergreen Cup.

== Honours ==
- Kent 1 champions: 1987–88
- London 2 South East champions (2): 1991–92, 2013–14
- London 2 South champions: 1994–95
- London 1 champions: 1995–96
- Kent Plate winners: 2015
