= Tunbridge Wells RFC =

English rugby union club, based in Tunbridge Wells

- Full name: Tunbridge Wells Rugby Football Club
- Union: Kent RFU
- Nickname: Wells
- Founded: 1931; 95 years ago (as Old Skinners)
- Location: Royal Tunbridge Wells, Kent, England
- Ground: St Marks Recreation Ground (Capacity: 3,000)
- Chairman: Mike Rigby
- President: Jim Hendley
- Captain: TBC
- League: Regional 1 South Central
- 2025–26: 3rd

Official website
- www.twrfc.com

Tunbridge Wells RFC is an English rugby union club, based Royal Tunbridge Wells, Kent and play in Regional 1 South Central.

== History ==
Tunbridge Wells RFC was officially formed as Old Skinners RFC in 1931 as a rugby union club for former pupils of The Skinners' School. In 1970, membership of the club became open to non-Skinners pupils with Old Skinners being renamed as Tunbridge Wells RFC in 1973. Despite becoming an open club, Tunbridge Wells retain their links with The Skinners' School, specifically by not selecting Skinners pupils who represent Skinners while they are competing in the Daily Mail Cup to assist them. In 1985, Tunbridge Wells had a new clubhouse constructed, which was opened by Princess Anne.

Since the creation of league rugby in 1987, Tunbridge Wells played mainly in London 1 South where they also played league matches against future RFU Championship side, Jersey and regularly attempted to enter National League 3 London & SE. In 2011, Tunbridge Wells were relegated to London 2 South East. The following season they were relegated again to London 3 South East. The club managed to reverse the trend and win promotion back to the London 2 South East league after finishing in the runner up position in the London 3 South East league in the 2012–13 season.

They also compete in Kent cup competitions.

In addition to the 1st XV the club regularly fields other adult sides (including a social and Vets side) competing in various Kent RFU league competitions. In the 2012–13 season the 2nd XV won the Invicta 1 league.

In 2012, Tunbridge Wells set up a scheme where players from their youth teams would act as ambassadors to local schools for the club to assist with coaching and participation in rugby. This innovative plan was praised by the Rugby Football Union as "a great idea" as a number of other rugby clubs also set up similar schemes following on from Tunbridge Wells'. Tunbridge Wells are also affiliated to English Premiership team, Saracens.

The 1st XV went unbeaten in the 2015–16 season winning the London 2 South East league title and the RFU Intermediate Cup. They were then promoted again in the 2016–17 season to the London and South East Premier League.

== Honours ==
- London 2 South East champions (4): 1987–88, 2000–01, 2005–06, 2015–16
- Kent 1 champions: 1995–96
- Kent Plate winners (3): 1999, 2000, 2008
- RFU Intermediate Cup winners: 2015–16
- London 1 (north v south) promotion play-off winners: 2016–17

== Notable players ==
- Colin Smart – England
- (United States) Bill Hayward – USA Eagles
- Martin Corry – England Captain, Lions Captain, Leicester Tigers Captain, Barbarians Captain
- Matthew Cook – Spain
- Will Edwards – England 7s, Harlequins
- Robert Greig – Norway
- Mark Davey – Malta
- Ryan le Roux - Spain national rugby union, 7s and 15s
