= Medway RFC =

English rugby union club, based in Rochester, Kent

Medway
- Full name: Medway Rugby Football Club
- Union: Kent Rugby Football Union
- Founded: 1931; 95 years ago
- Location: Rochester, Kent
- Ground: Priestfields
- President: Mark Marriott
- Coach: Ricky Reeves
- Captain: Antony Clement
- League: Regional 2 South East
- 2024–25: 1st (promoted to Regional 1 South East)

Official website
- www.mrfc.net

Medway Rugby Football Club is an English rugby union club based in Rochester, Kent. The first XV team currently play in Regional 1 South East, following their promotion at the end of 2024–25 season from Regional 2 South East.

When league rugby began in 1987, Medway were placed in Kent 1 and the club has won a league and cup double twice, in 2008–09 and 2016–17. The club reached tier 5 for the first time in 2022–23 but only survived at that level for a single season when they finished bottom of Regional 1 South East.

== Honours ==
- Regional 2 South East champions: 2024–25
- London 2 South East champions: 2016–17
- Kent Shield winners: 2016–17
- Kent Vase winners: 2008–09
- Kent 1 champions: 2008–09
- Kent 2 champions: 2007–-08
