= Tonbridge Juddians RFC =

English rugby union club, based in Tonbridge, Kent

(England) Tonbridge Juddians
- Full name: Tonbridge Juddians Rugby Football Club
- Union: Kent RFU
- Founded: 1904 (Tonbridge), 1928 (Old Juddians), 1999 (clubs merged)
- Location: Tonbridge, Kent, England
- Ground: The Slade (Capacity: 1,500)
- League: National League 1
- 2025–26: 8th
Team kit

Official website
- tjrfc.co.uk

Tonbridge Juddians Rugby Football Club is an English rugby union team based in Tonbridge in Kent. The club runs four senior teams, a ladies side and the full range of junior teams. The first XV currently play in National League 1 following their promotion from the 2024–25 National League 2 East.

== History ==
Tonbridge RFC was formed in 1904 and Old Juddians was formed in 1928. 'Old Juddians' were former pupils of The Judd School in Tonbridge.

The two clubs merged to form Tonbridge Juddians in 1999. The merged club began life in London 2 South, the same level at which Old Juddians was placed in when the league system was founded in 1987. The club suffered two further relegations before turning semi-professional and beginning a rapid climb up the pyramid, including a hat-trick of promotions, with the club joining the national leagues in 2011.

== Honours ==
Men's first XV

- London 2 South East champions (2): 1990–91, (Note: 1990–91 London 2 South East title was won when the league was known as London 3 South East and was won by founder club Old Juddian.) 2009–10
- Kent 2 champions: 1990–91 (Note: 1990–91 Kent 2 title was won by founder club Tonbridge.)
- Kent 3 champions: 1995–96 (Note: 1995–96 Kent 3 title was won by founder club Tonbridge.)
- London Division 4 South East champions: 2008–09
- London Division 1 South champions: 2010–11
- Kent Plate winners: 2012
- Kent Cup winners (2): 2015, 2017
- National League 3 London & SE champions: 2016–17
- National League 2 East champions: 2024–25

Youth

- RFU National Colts Cup (U18) champions (2): 2015, 2023
- RFU National U17 Cup champions: 2017

== Current standings ==
2026–27 National League 1 table
Pos	Team	Pld	W	D	L	PF	PA	PD	TB	LB	Pts	Qualification
1	Plymouth Albion	5	5	0	0	292	57	+235	5	0	25	Promotion place
2	Tonbridge Juddians	5	5	0	0	216	203	+13	5	0	25	Promotion play-off
3	Sale FC	5	4	0	1	231	141	+90	4	1	21	Promotion play-off
4	Camborne	5	4	0	1	163	144	+19	4	0	20	
5	Bishop's Stortford	5	3	0	2	184	170	+14	4	0	16	
6	Birmingham Moseley	5	3	0	2	148	191	−43	4	0	16	
7	Leeds Tykes	5	2	0	3	179	121	+58	3	3	14	
8	Rosslyn Park	5	2	0	3	178	193	−15	4	1	13	
9	Dings Crusaders	5	1	1	3	203	199	+4	5	2	13	
10	Bury St Edmunds	5	2	0	3	158	218	−60	4	0	12	
11	Rams	5	1	1	3	129	177	−48	4	1	11	Relegation play-off
12	Sheffield	5	1	0	4	98	156	−58	3	2	9	Relegation place
13	London Scottish	5	1	0	4	141	211	−70	3	1	8	Relegation place
14	Cambridge	5	0	0	5	149	288	−139	4	3	7	Relegation place

Updated to match(es) played on 5 June 2026. Source: National League Rugby
Rules for classification: If teams are level at any stage, tiebreakers are applied in the following order:
1. Number of matches won
2. Number of matches drawn
3. Difference between points for and against
4. Total number of points for
5. Aggregate number of points scored in matches between tied teams
6. Number of matches won excluding the first match, then the second and so on until the tie is settled
