= Old Elthamians =

English rugby union club, based in Bromley, London

(England) Old Elthamians
- Full name: Old Elthamians Rugby Football Club
- Union: Kent RFU
- Founded: 1911; 115 years ago
- Location: Chislehurst, Bromley, London, England
- Ground: Hospital Ground Perry St Chislehurst (Capacity: 1,800)
- Chairman: Russel Pooley
- President: Johnny Mack
- Captain: Richie Trew
- League: Counties 2 Kent
- 2024–25: 1st (promoted to Counties 1 Kent)

Official website
- www.pitchero.com/clubs/oldelthamians/

Old Elthamians Rugby Football Club is an English rugby union club based in Chislehurst in SE London. Due to financial difficulties they withdrew from National League One, the third tier of English club rugby, in August, 2021.

Upon returning to league rugby the club were placed in Counties 3 Kent. The club left the Eltham College Meadows Ground and returned home to Chislehurst ahead of the 2022–23 season having been removed from College Meadows by Guy Sanderson Headmaster of the school due to the debt owed to Eltham College by Kobus Paulsen the main benefactor of Old Elthamians who died suddenly in 2019.

== History ==
Old Elthamians was formed in 1911 and ran four senior teams and a full range of junior teams. In 2014–15 the club moved ground from the Foxbury to Queen Mary Sports Ground in Chislehurst, where they were resident for just two seasons before moving their home of College Meadow (owned by Eltham College) in Mottingham, for the 2016–17 season. Old Elthamians had their first home game at College Meadow on 17 September 2016, defeating visitors Clifton 46 - 19 in front of 420 spectators.

On 25 March 2017 Old Elthamians, riding high in National League 2 South, achieved a club record win 97–7 against bottom club Exmouth, a tally that included 15 tries. They finished second that season, qualifying for a promotion play-off against the runner-up from National League 2 North. On 6 May 2017 Old Elthamians travelled to take on Sale FC at Heywood Road, winning a close game 19–14 to claim promotion to the 2017–18 National League 1; the highest level in the club's history. The 2016–17 season also saw Dominic Lespierre score 36 league tries to break the previous best of 32 set by Renford Bennet.

On 16 December 2017 Old Elthamians beat Blackheath 32–7 in front of a then club record crowd of 1,653 at College Meadow, in what was the first league meeting between the two sides in 106 years despite both being based in south London. This record was topped the very next season when a crowd of 1,770 at College Meadow saw Old Elthamians lose 11–12 to Blackheath on 22 December 2018 in a top of the table clash.

== Honours ==
- Kent 2 champions: 2002–03
- Kent Vase winners: 2004
- Kent 1 v Sussex 1 promotion play-off winner: 2004–05
- London Division 4 South West champions: 2005–06
- London Division 2 East champions (2): 2008–09, 2010–11
- London 1 (north v south) promotion play-off winner: 2011–12
- National League 3 (south-east v south-west) promotion play-off winner: 2013–14
- National 2 (north v south) promotion play-off winner: 2016–17

== Club records ==
- Largest win: 97–7

Versus Exmouth at College Meadow on 25 March 2017

- Highest attendance: 1,770

Versus Blackheath at College Meadow on 22 December 2018

- Most tries in a season: 36

(Guyana) Dominic Lespierre (2016–17)

== Final league season ==
They finished ninth in their final league season.
