= New Eltham =

Area of south east London, England

Coordinates: 51.43770°N 0.07037°E

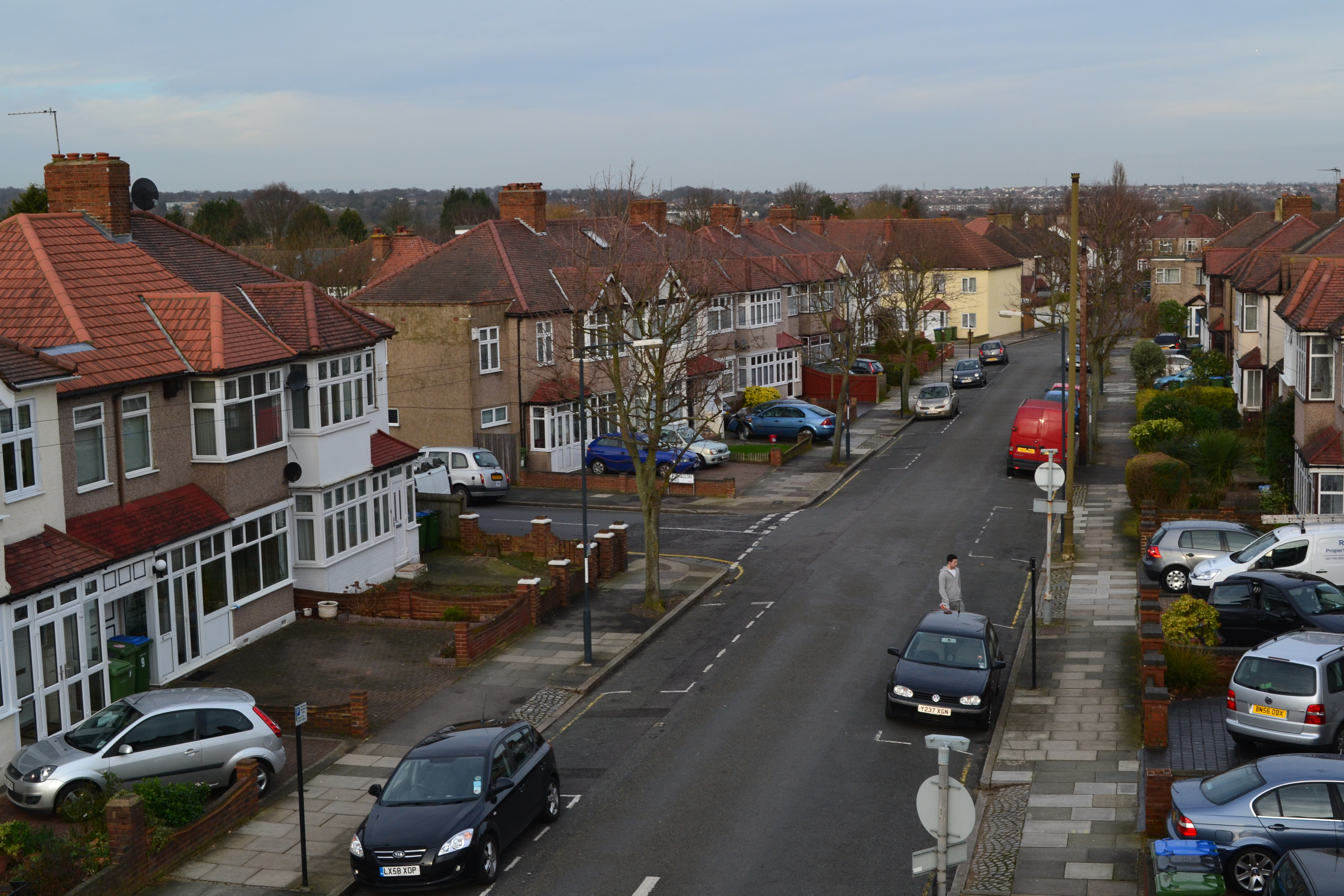
- Typical 1930s New Eltham housing in Thaxted Road

- Location within Greater London
- OS grid reference: TQ440730
- London borough: Greenwich; Bexley
- Ceremonial county: Greater London
- Region: London
- Country: England
- Sovereign state: United Kingdom
- Post town: LONDON
- Postcode district: SE9
- Dialling code: 020
- Police: Metropolitan
- Fire: London
- Ambulance: London
- UK Parliament: Eltham & Chislehurst
- London Assembly: Greenwich and Lewisham; Bexley and Bromley

New Eltham is a suburban area of South East London, England, primarily in the Royal Borough of Greenwich with some parts in the London Borough of Bexley. It is located south east of Eltham and north west of Sidcup.

== History ==
New Eltham is a largely residential suburb of Greater London developed on former farmland to the south of Eltham in and around the small hamlet and crossroads of Pope Street, centred around what is today Avery Hill Road. On the main building of Wyborne School (Footscray Road) there is a sign clearly identifying it as "Pope Street" School, built in 1904.

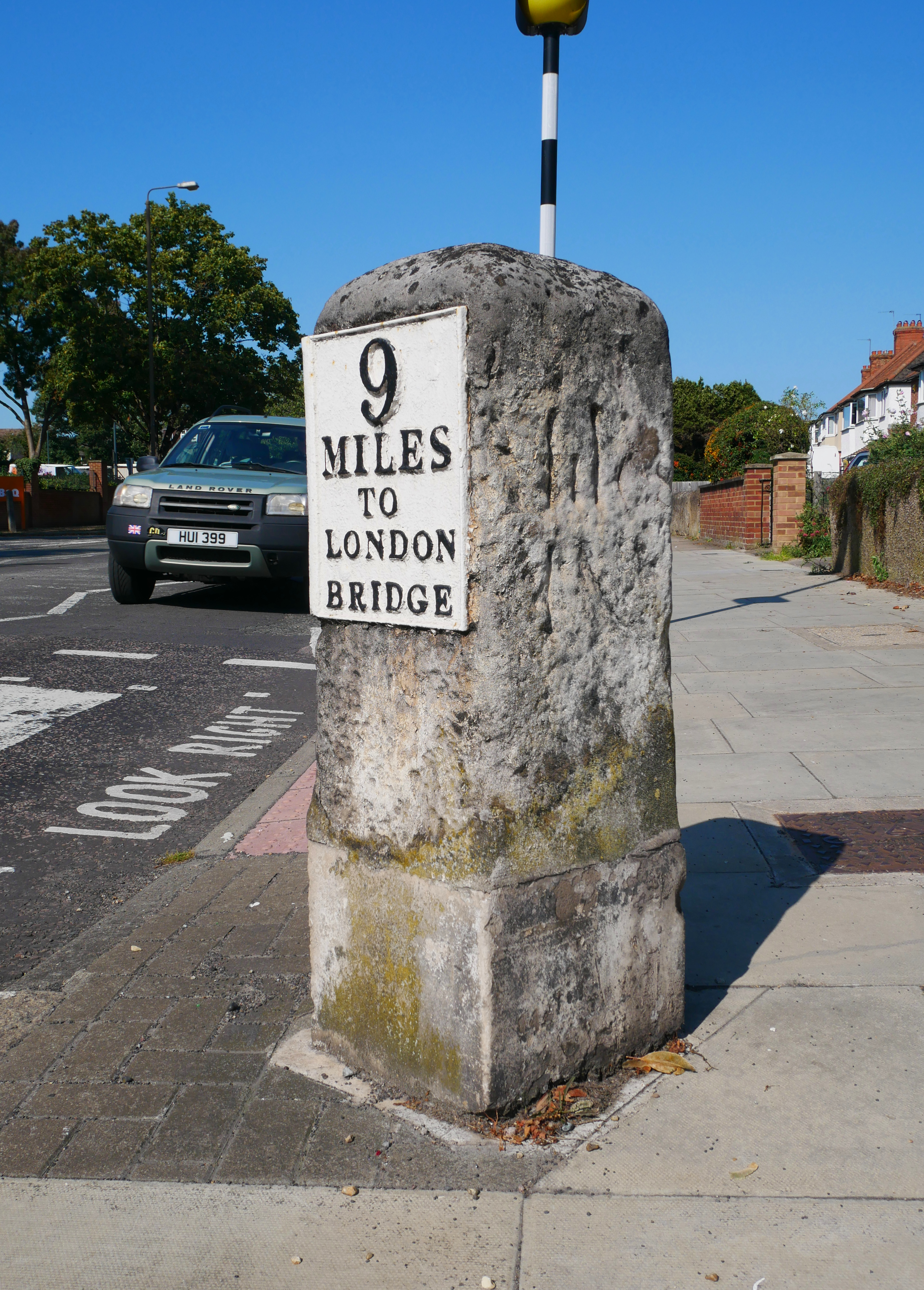
An eighteenth-century milestone stands along Footscray Road in New Eltham

New Eltham railway station was opened as Pope Street Station in April 1878, twelve years after the opening of the Dartford Loop Line. The station was renamed New Eltham in 1886 although Pope Street was retained as a suffix until 1927. In 1974 the bridge (crossing the railway line) at Avery Hill Road was widened to allow buses to cross it. This replaced a narrow iron bridge which only had a separate path on one side for pedestrians.

The Beehive public house was rebuilt in 1897. Most of New Eltham's housing dates from the 1930s. A library was built in 1931.

As part of London's Cold War civil defences, a rectangular windowless blockhouse was built in 1954 behind New Eltham library. It served as the Woolwich Borough Control and when Woolwich merged with Greenwich in 1965 it took over the role as the Greenwich Borough Control. The control was part of the South East London Group reporting to the Regional Group War HQ at Chislehurst and later to Pear Tree House.

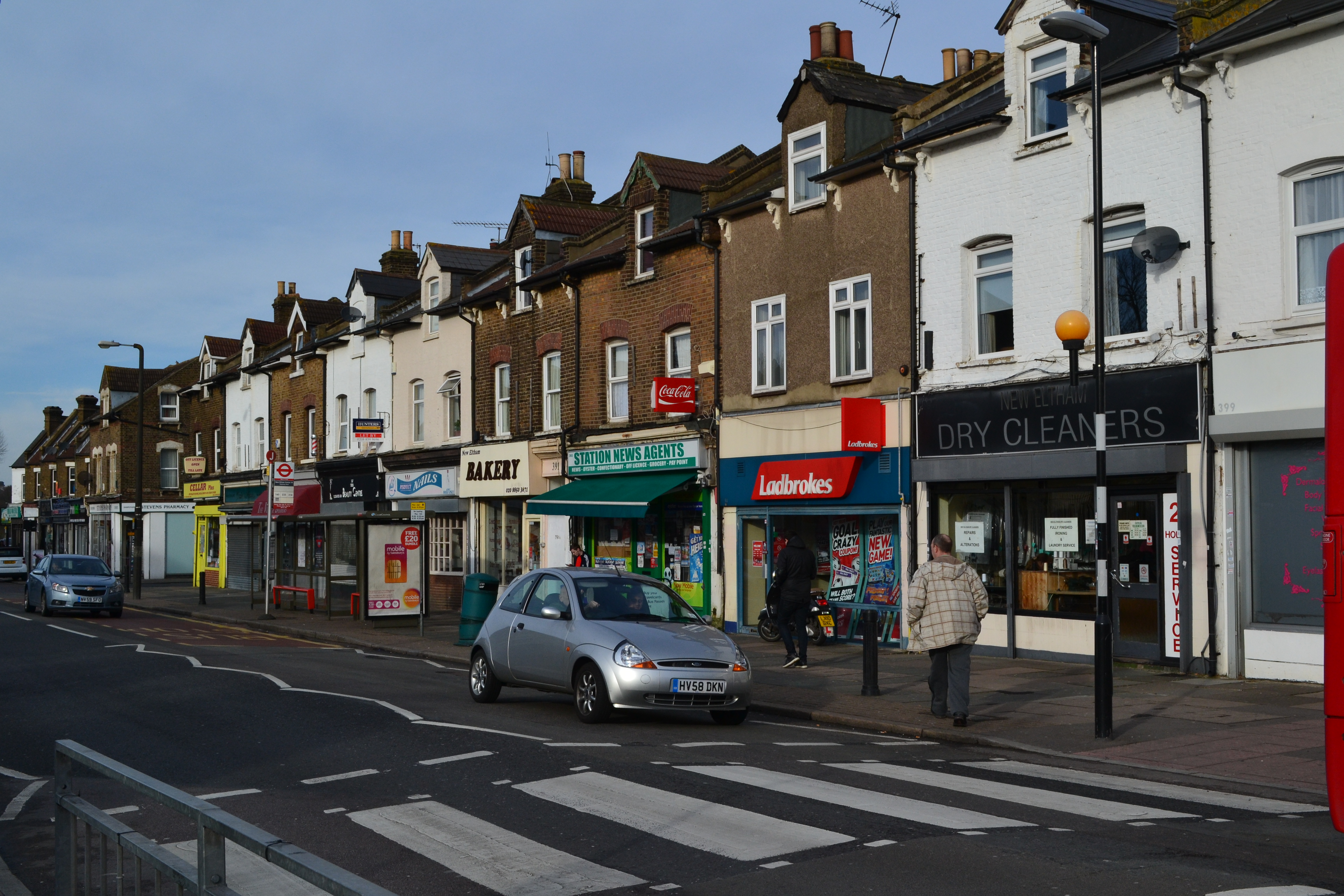
Shops in Footscray Road, New Eltham

Until the mid-1970s New Eltham had 3 butchers, 2 greengrocers, 3 grocers, 2 toy shops, a shoe repairer, 2 barbers, a radio and television repair shop, a clothing and material store, timber yard, cycle sales and repairs, 2 motor spares, hardware store, 2 dairies and a fishmongers. The Co-operative supermarket was previously a series of smaller separate purpose Co-op shops: a greengrocer, a chemist, butcher, and grocery store. A fishmongers later became a fish and chips shop (and still is as of 2021). Behind this, in what is now the car park was the Co-op dairy; the other (Unigate) was in Green Lane near Fiveways in what is now a small business park.

== Sport and recreation ==
Championship side Charlton Athletic has a training ground in New Eltham, down Sparrows Lane. The area's other football teams include Newpark F.C., which played in the South London Football Alliance Division 3 and are currently holders of the Beckenham Hospital Cup, and one New Eltham team, playing in the London & Kent Borders League and based at the STC Ground on Ivor Grove

Footscray RUFC is located on Footscray Road. It has three men's team (the first team playing in the Shepherd Neame Kent 2 league), a ladies team and minis rugby.

RACS Cricket Club are based in the area.

New Eltham also has a running club, New Eltham Joggers. A section of the South East London Green Chain walk passes through New Eltham.

New Eltham Operatic Society is a member of the National Operatic and Dramatic Association. Dance classes are held above the Co-op store.

== Amenities ==
Near the railway station is the library, the Co-operative food store, a cluster of small shops and the Post Office. Larger chain stores may be found in nearby Eltham and Sidcup high streets. The public house was refurbished in 2009.

== Nearby places ==
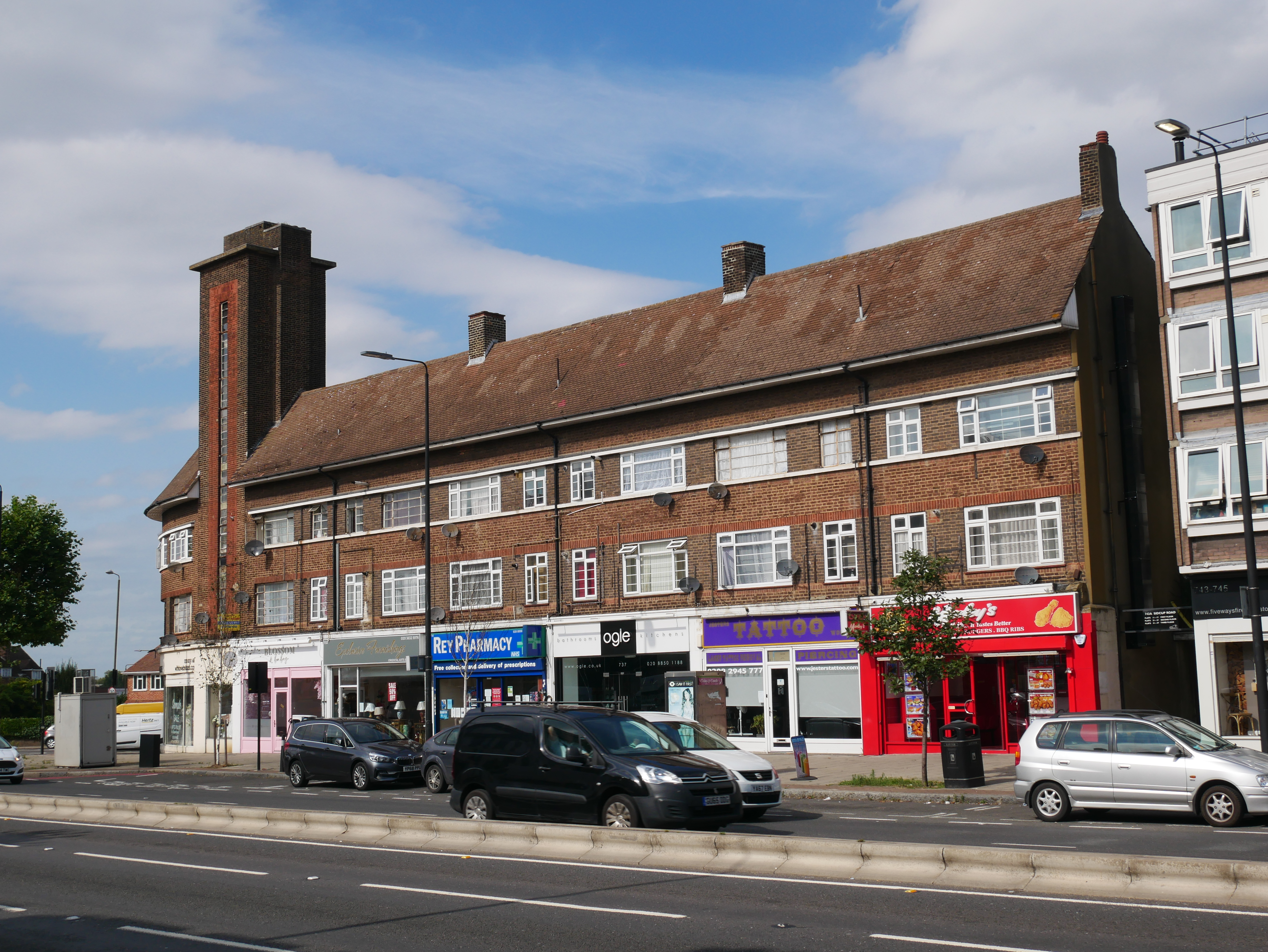
A block of residential and commercial units along Sidcup Road in New Eltham

New Eltham borders Avery Hill to the north and north east, Sidcup to the east and south east, Chislehurst to the south, Mottingham to the west and Eltham to the north west.

== Transport ==
New Eltham station serves the area, with services to Central London and Gravesend. New Eltham is served by several Transport for London bus services connecting it with Beckenham, Bexleyheath, Bromley, Catford, Chislehurst, Eltham, Lewisham, New Addington, New Cross, Sidcup and Swanley.
