= Footscray RUFC =

English rugby union club, based in New Eltham, London

(England) Footscray
- Full name: Footscray Rugby Union Football Club
- Union: Kent RFU, Middlesex RFU
- Founded: 1967; 59 years ago
- Location: New Eltham, Greenwich, London, England
- Ground: Footscray Playing Fields
- Chairman: Dicky Bunton
- President: Barry Lewis
- Coach: Sam Leese Leigh Rogers
- Captain: Kelvin Munroe
- League: Kent 2
- 2019–20: Promoted to Kent 1 (2nd)

Official website
- www.pitchero.com/clubs/footscrayrufc

Footscray RUFC is a rugby union club based in New Eltham, South East London. The club has three men's teams, a women's team and a mini rugby section.

The club was formed in 1967 by workers at the Kolster-Brandes (later ITT, and then STC) Factory in Foots Cray, Kent. In the early 90s, STC closed the Foots Cray site and the side became homeless, playing home games at a local school for a period. The club moved to New Eltham in 1995.

The club hosts the annual Footscray 7s tournament on the first Saturday in May. The rugby sevens tournament attracts high quality entrants from across the country.

== See also ==
- Kent RFU
- Middlesex RFU
