= 2026–27 National League 2 East =

Rugby union competition in England

- Countries: England
- Date: 5 September 2026 – April 2027
- Matches played: 7
- Tries scored: 72 (average 10.3 per match)

The 2026–27 National League 2 East is the fifth season of the fourth-tier (east) of the English domestic men's rugby union competitions; one of three at this level. The others are National League 2 North and National League 2 West.

== Structure ==
The league consists of fourteen teams who play the others on a home and away basis, to make a total of 26 matches each. The champions are promoted to National League 1 while the runner-up goes into the four team National 2 play-offs with the runners-up from National League 2 North and National League 2 West and the 11th placed side in National League 1.

The bottom two teams are relegated to Regional 1 South Central or Regional 1 South East, while the 12th placed side goes into the four team Regional 1 play-offs with the 12th placed sides from National League 2 North and National League 2 West, as well as the Regional 1 play-off winners.

The results of the matches contribute points to the league as follows:

- 4 points are awarded for a win
- 2 points are awarded for a draw
- 0 points are awarded for a loss, however
- 1 losing (bonus) point is awarded to a team that loses a match by 7 points or fewer
- 1 additional (bonus) point is awarded to a team scoring 4 tries or more in a match.

=== Participating teams and locations ===
Departing were champions Bury St Edmunds promoted to National League One. Runner-up Oundle defeated Tynedale of National League North but missed out on promotion when they lost the accession final to Birmingham Moseley. Also departing were Sevenoaks (13th) and Oxford Harlequins (14th) relegated to Regional 1 South East and Regional 1 Midlands respectively. Henley Hawks (12th) avoided relegation winning their play-off final against Tunbridge Wells of Regional 1 South Central.

Joining the league were Colchester promoted from Regional 1 South East as champions together with Jersey promoted from Regional 1 South Central while Leicester Lions were relegated from National League 1

Team	Ground	Capacity	City/Area	Previous season
Barnes	Barn Elms	1,000	Barnes, London	4th
Canterbury	Marine Travel Ground	1,500 (75 seats)	Canterbury, Kent	5th
Colchester	Raven Park	1,200	Colchester, Essex	Promoted from Regional 1 South East
Dorking	The Big Field	1,500	Dorking, Surrey	6th
Esher	Molesey Road	3,500	Hersham, Surrey	11th
Guernsey Raiders	Footes Lane	5,000 (720 seats)	Saint Peter Port, Guernsey	10th
Havant	Hook's Lane	1,500 (500 seats)	Havant, Hampshire	8th
Henley Hawks	Dry Leas	4,000	Henley-on-Thames, Oxfordshire	12th
Jersey	St Peter		Saint Peter, Jersey	Promoted from Regional 1 South Central
Leicester Lions	Westleigh Park	2,000	Blaby, Leicestershire	Relegated from National League 1 (14th)
London Welsh	Old Deer Park	5,850 (1,000 seats)	Richmond, London	9th
Old Albanian	Woollam's Playing Fields	1,000	St Albans, Hertfordshire	3rd
Oundle	Occupation Road	1,000	Oundle, Northamptonshire	2nd
Westcombe Park	Goddington Dene	3,200 (200 seats)	Orpington, London	7th

Locations of the 2026–27 National League 2 East teams

== League table ==
2026–27 National League 2 East table
Pos	Team	Pld	W	D	L	PF	PA	PD	TB	LB	Pts	Qualification
1	Oundle	10	10	0	0	396	190	+206	10	0	50	Promotion place
2	Esher	10	9	0	1	398	276	+122	10	0	46	Promotion play-off
3	Old Albanian	10	7	0	3	391	296	+95	9	0	37	
4	Dorking	10	7	0	3	311	251	+60	8	1	37	
5	Canterbury	10	6	0	4	384	299	+85	9	3	36	
6	Barnes	10	6	0	4	303	288	+15	8	2	34	
7	Guernsey Raiders	10	6	0	4	292	289	+3	7	2	33	
8	Havant	10	5	0	5	349	391	−42	9	0	29	
9	Colchester	10	4	0	6	335	361	−26	10	2	28	
10	Henley Hawks	10	3	1	6	293	301	−8	7	2	23	
11	Leicester Lions	10	2	0	8	240	357	−117	6	2	16	
12	Westcombe Park	10	2	0	8	290	421	−131	7	1	16	Relegation play-off
13	London Welsh	10	1	0	9	248	380	−132	7	5	16	Relegation place
14	Jersey	10	1	1	8	227	357	−130	5	2	13	Relegation place

Updated to match(es) played on 7 November 2026. Source: National League Rugby
Rules for classification: If teams are level at any stage, tiebreakers are applied in the following order:
1. Number of matches won
2. Number of matches drawn
3. Difference between points for and against
4. Total number of points for
5. Aggregate number of points scored in matches between tied teams
6. Number of matches won excluding the first match, then the second and so on until the tie is settled

== Fixtures & results ==
=== Round 1 ===
5 September 2026
13:00

(1 BP) Jersey	22 – 33	London Welsh (1 BP)
Try: Thomas 33' m Bird 39' m, 71 m' Macfarlane 77' c Con: Cochrane (1/4) 78'	Report	Try: Monye 2' c, 45' c Wilkins 29' c, 41' m Perkins 59' c Con: Morgan (4/5) 3', 29', 46', 60'

St Peter
Referee: Tom Bird

5 September 2026
14:00

(1 BP) Oundle	52 – 31	Esher (1 BP)
Try: Adendorff 8' c Snelling 12' c Green 28' c Annand 55' c Burrows 63' c Hamilton 66' c, 74' m, 79' m Con: Arden (3/3) 9', 13', 28'; Annand (3/5) 56', 64', 67'	Report	Try: Gribbon 20' c Thorne 39' c Botterill 44' c Thornton 72' c Con: Dalrymple (4/4) 21', 40', 45', 73'; Pen: Dalrymple (1/1) 51'

Occupation Road
Referee: Conor Boyle

5 September 2026
15:00

(1 BP) Barnes	45 – 28	Colchester (1 BP)
Try: Briers 5' c Nimmo 13' m Branfield 17' c, 44' m, 68' c Robertshaw 27' c Dawud 80' c Con: Park (5/7) 6', 18', 28', 68', 80+1'	Report	Try: Park 41' c Daly 55' c Reid 71' c Williams 75' c Con: Mills (4/4) 42', 56', 72', 76'

Barn Elms
Referee: Alexander Rose

5 September 2026
15:00

(2 BP) Canterbury	31 – 34	Old Albanian
Try: Jones 8' c, 62' c Eule 70' c, 75' c Con: Hollidge (4/4) 9', 63', 71', 76'; Pen: Hollidge (1/1) 18'	Report	Try: Noot 2' c Charter 12' m Mcphun 30' c Elone 44' m Gray 48' c Con: Mcphun (3/5) 3', 31', 49; Pen: Mcphun (1/1) 64'

The Marine Travel Ground
Referee: Simon Waite

5 September 2026
15:00

(1 BP) Havant	43 – 35	Dorking (1 BP)
Try: Trodd 3' c, 26' c Holt 7' c Perry 47' c Vince 65' m Dugan 75' c Con: Knight (5/6) 4', 8', 27', 48', 76'; Pen: Knight (1/1) 73'	Report	Try: Williamson 22' c Iles 40' c O'Leary-Blade 52' c, 78' c Newman 65' c Con: Thorn (5/5) 23', 40', 53', 66', 79'

Hook's Lane
Referee: William Foster

5 September 2026
15:00

(1 BP) Westcombe Park	38 – 35	Henley Hawks (2 BP)
Try: Harris 9' m, 36' c Rufai 16' c Fryatt 23' c, 49' c Brown 72' m Con: Brown (4/6) 16', 23', 36', 49'	Report	Try: Kinniburgh 27' c Molhoek 33' c, 79' c Penalty Try 64'; Taylor 76' c Con: Hodgson (4/4) 28', 34', 77', 80'

Goddington Dene
Referee: Philip Russell

5 September 2026
17:00

Leicester Lions	19 – 40	Guernsey Raiders (1 BP)
Try: Priestly-Nangle 48' m, 55' c Price 80' c Con: Waterfield (2/3) 56', 80'	Report	Try: Creber 15' c Dawe 22' c Callery 35' c, 51' c Dromantas 59' m Armstrong 77' c Con: Parks (5/6) 16', 23', 36', 52', 78'

Westleigh Park
Referee: Max Marshall

=== Round 2 ===
12 September 2026
13:30

Jersey	19 – 36	Guernsey Raiders (1 BP)

CoinShares Park, St Peter

12 September 2026
14:00

(1 BP) Oundle	40 – 10	Leicester Lions

Occupation Road

12 September 2026
15:00

(1 BP) Colchester	40 – 12	Westcombe Park

Raven Park

12 September 2026
15:00

Dorking	15 – 38	Canterbury (1 BP)

The Big Field

12 September 2026
15:00

(1 BP) Esher	48 – 12	Havant

Molesey Road

12 September 2026
15:00

(1 BP) Henley Hawks	30 – 29	London Welsh (2 BP)

Dry Leas

12 September 2026
15:30

(1 BP) Old Albanian	32 – 26	Barnes (2 BP)

Woollam's Playing Fields

=== Round 3 ===
19 September 2026
14:00

(1 BP) Guernsey Raiders	39 – 19	Henley Hawks

Footes Lane

19 September 2026
14:00

(1 BP) Leicester Lions	30 – 17	Jersey

Westleigh Park

19 September 2026
14:30

(1 BP) Havant	26 – 39	Oundle (1 BP)

Hook's Lane

19 September 2026
15:00

(1 BP) Barnes	25 – 30	Dorking

Barn Elms

19 September 2026
15:00

(2 BP) Canterbury	31 – 34	Esher (1 BP)

The Marine Travel Ground

19 September 2026
15:00

(2 BP) London Welsh	40 – 43	Colchester (1 BP)

Old Deer Park

19 September 2026
15:00

(1 BP) Westcombe Park	24 – 55	Old Albanian (1 BP)

Goddington Dene

=== Round 4 ===
25 September 2026
19:45

(1 BP) Old Albanian	54 – 26	London Welsh (1 BP)

Woollam's Playing Fields

26 September 2026
14:00

(1 BP) Colchester	33 – 41	Guernsey Raiders (1 BP)

Raven Park

26 September 2026
14:00

(1 BP) Henley Hawks	31 – 31	Jersey (1 BP)

Dry Leas

26 September 2026
14:00

(1 BP) Oundle	36 – 22	Canterbury

Occupation Road

26 September 2026
14:30

(1 BP) Havant	50 – 29	Leicester Lions (1 BP)

Hook's Lane

26 September 2026
15:00

(1 BP) Dorking	40 – 28	Westcombe Park (1 BP)

The Big Field

26 September 2026
15:00

(1 BP) Esher	41 – 22	Barnes (1 BP)

Molesey Road

=== Round 5 ===
3 October 2026
14:00

Leicester Lions	3 – 33	Henley Hawks (1 BP)

Westleigh Park

3 October 2026
14:30

(1 BP) Jersey	43 – 36	Colchester (2 BP)

CoinShares Park

3 October 2026
15:00

Barnes	21 – 41	Oundle (1 BP)

Barn Elms

3 October 2026
15:00

(1 BP) Canterbury	59 – 34	Havant (1 BP)

Marine Travel Ground

3 October 2026
15:00

London Welsh	10 – 33	Dorking (1 BP)

Old Deer Park

3 October 2026
15:00

(2 BP) Westcombe Park	37 – 43	Esher (1 BP)

Goddington Dene

3 October 2026
17:00

(1 BP) Guernsey	35 – 26	Old Albanian (1 BP)

Footes Lane

10 October 2026
15:00

–

-->

=== Round 10 ===
14 November 2026
13:30

(1 BP) Havant	33 – 28	Jersey (2 BP)

Hook's Lane

14 November 2026
14:00

(1 BP) Barnes	26 – 19	London Welsh (1 BP)

Barn Elms

14 November 2026
14:00

(1 BP) Canterbury	52 – 14	Guernsey

Marine Travel Ground

14 November 2026
14:00

(1 BP) Oundle	41 – 34	Henley Hawks (2 BP)

Occupation Road

14 November 2026
14:00

(1 BP) Westcombe Park	36 – 35	Leicester Lions (2 BP)

Goddington Dene

14 November 2026
14:00

(1 BP) Dorking	36 – 19	Old Albanian

The Big Field

14 November 2026
14:00

(1 BP) Esher	41 – 33	Colchester (1 BP)

Molesey Road

=== Round 11 ===
21 November 2026
14:00

Guernsey	20 – 10	Barnes

Footes Lane

21 November 2026
14:00

Leicester Lions	17 – 56	Dorking (1 BP)

Westleigh Park

21 November 2026
14:30

(1 BP) London Welsh	34 – 31	Westcombe Park (2 BP)

Old Deer Park

21 November 2026
15:00

(2 BP) Colchester	38 – 43	Oundle (1 BP)

Raven Park

21 November 2026
15:00

(1 BP) Henley Hawks	27 – 27	Havant (1 BP)

Dry Leas

21 November 2026
15:00

(1 BP) Old Albanian	33 – 54	Esher (1 BP)

The Woollams

21 November 2026
16:20

Jersey	–	Canterbury

CoinShares Park

== Individual statistics ==
- Does not include promotion/relegation play-offs.

=== Top points scorers ===
Rank	Player	Team	Points
1	Mathew Branfield	Barnes	15
1	Rian Hamilton	Oundle	15
3	Elliot Mcphun	Old Albanian	14
4	Max Brown	Westcombe Park	13
5	Jamie Annand	Oundle	11
5	Matthew Dalrymple	Esher	11
5	Lewis Hollidge	Canterbury	11

=== Top try scorers ===
Rank	Player	Team	Tries
1	Mathew Branfield	Barnes	3
1	Rian Hamilton	Oundle	3
3	Twelve players		2

== See also ==
- 2026–27 Champ Rugby
- 2026–27 National League 1
- 2026–27 National League 2 North
- 2026–27 National League 2 West
