= 2025–26 National League 2 East =

Rugby union competition in England

- Countries: England
- Date: 6 September 2025 – 25 April 2026
- Champions: Bury St Edmunds (1st title)
- Runners-up: Oundle
- Relegated: Oxford Harlequins, Sevenoaks
- Matches played: 182
- Attendance: 80,433 (average 442 per match)
- Highest attendance: 1,357 – Bury SE v O Albanian, 25 April 2026
- Lowest attendance: 113 – Oxford v O Albanian, 8 November 2025
- Tries scored: 1667 (average 9.2 per match)
- Top point scorer: 286 – Benjamin Penfold (Bury St Edmunds)
- Top try scorer: 32 – James Botterill (Esher)

The 2025–26 National League 2 East is the fourth season of the fourth-tier (east) of the English domestic rugby union competitions; one of three at this level. The others are National League 2 North and National League 2 West.

Bury St Edmunds finished the season as champions on 25 April 2026, a thundering 95 – 28 home victory against Old Albanian on the last day of the season taking them to the title, just 2 points clear of runners up Oundle. It was the most keenly fought promotion battle in National League 2 East history, with three sides, including Old Albanian, looking like they could claim the title towards the end of the season.

Oxford Harlequins were the first club to be relegated, a 21 – 71 defeat away to title challengers Oundle on 14 March 2026 condemning them to the drop with four games still left to play. The second automatic relegation spot would be taken by Sevenoaks on 18 April 2026, going down with a game to play, a 61 – 28 victory away to the already relegated Oxford Harlequins not enough to keep them up due to results elsewhere. 12th place Henley Hawks would remain in the division following their National League 2 East Accession Final 43 – 7 victory against Tunbridge Wells (R1SC).

== Structure ==
The league consists of fourteen teams who play the others on a home and away basis, to make a total of 26 matches each. The champions are promoted to National League 1 while the runners up go into the four team National 2 playoffs with the runners up from National League 2 North and National League 2 West and the 11th placed side in National League 1.

The bottom two teams are relegated to Regional 1 South Central or Regional 1 South East, while the 12th placed side go into the four team Regional 1 playoffs with the 12th placed sides from National League 2 North and National League 2 West, as well as the Regional 1 playoff winners.

The results of the matches contribute points to the league as follows:

- 4 points are awarded for a win
- 2 points are awarded for a draw
- 0 points are awarded for a loss, however
- 1 losing (bonus) point is awarded to a team that loses a match by 7 points or fewer
- 1 additional (bonus) point is awarded to a team scoring 4 tries or more in a match.

=== Participating teams and locations ===
Locations of the 2025–26 National League 2 East teams

Team	Ground	Capacity	City/Area	Previous season
Barnes	Barn Elms	1,000	Barnes, London	3rd
Bury St Edmunds	The Haberden	3,000 (135 seats)	Bury St Edmunds, Suffolk	9th
Canterbury	Marine Travel Ground	1,500 (75 seats)	Canterbury, Kent	4th
Dorking	The Big Field	1,500	Dorking, Surrey	2nd
Esher	Molesey Road	3,500	Hersham, Surrey	Relegated from National League 1 (13th)
Guernsey Raiders	Footes Lane	5,000 (720 seats)	Saint Peter Port, Guernsey	7th
Havant	Hook's Lane	1,500 (500 seats)	Havant, Hampshire	11th
Henley Hawks	Dry Leas	4,000	Henley-on-Thames, Oxfordshire	8th
London Welsh	Old Deer Park	5,850 (1,000 seats)	Richmond, London	Promoted from Regional 1 South Central
Old Albanian	Woollam's Playing Fields	1,000	St Albans, Hertfordshire	6th
Oundle	Occupation Road	1,000	Oundle, Northamptonshire	Promoted from Regional 1 South East
Oxford Harlequins	Horspath Sports Ground	1,000	Horspath, Oxfordshire	12th
Sevenoaks	Knole Paddock	1,000	Sevenoaks, Kent	10th
Westcombe Park	Goddington Dene	3,200 (200 seats)	Orpington, London	5th

== League table ==
2025–26 National League 2 East table
Pos	Team	Pld	W	D	L	PF	PA	PD	TB	LB	Pts	Qualification
1	Bury St Edmunds (C)	26	20	1	5	1128	659	+469	22	4	108	Promotion place
2	Oundle	26	20	2	4	940	713	+227	21	1	106	Promotion Play-off
3	Old Albanian	26	18	0	8	1009	813	+196	22	3	97	
4	Barnes	26	16	1	9	738	598	+140	15	5	86	
5	Canterbury	26	16	0	10	851	644	+207	16	6	86	
6	Dorking	26	14	2	10	798	598	+200	13	6	79	
7	Westcombe Park	26	12	0	14	851	751	+100	19	8	75	
8	Havant	26	11	1	14	840	960	−120	19	1	66	
9	London Welsh	26	10	0	16	705	866	−161	16	8	64	
10	Guernsey Raiders	26	11	1	14	690	875	−185	13	3	62	
11	Esher	26	10	0	16	844	831	+13	16	6	62	
12	Henley Hawks	26	9	2	15	693	665	+28	12	9	61	Relegation Play-off
13	Sevenoaks (R)	26	8	0	18	743	900	−157	12	5	49	Relegation place
14	Oxford Harlequins (R)	26	2	0	24	505	1462	−957	11	2	21	Relegation place

Updated to match(es) played on 2 May 2026. Source: National League Rugby
Rules for classification: If teams are level at any stage, tiebreakers are applied in the following order:
1. Number of matches won
2. Number of matches drawn
3. Difference between points for and against
4. Total number of points for
5. Aggregate number of points scored in matches between tied teams
6. Number of matches won excluding the first match, then the second and so on until the tie is settled

== Fixtures & results ==
=== Round 1 ===
6 September 2025
14:00

(1 BP) Henley Hawks	26 – 24	Guernsey Raiders (2 BP)

Dry Leas
Attendance: 223
Referee: Max Marshall

6 September 2025
14:00

(1 BP) Oundle	24 – 39	Havant (1 BP)

Occupation Road
Attendance: 181
Referee: Harry Parsons

6 September 2025
15:00

(1 BP) Barnes	26 – 14	Canterbury

Barn Elms
Attendance: 203
Referee: Peter Buchanan

6 September 2025
15:00

Dorking	17 – 10	London Welsh (1 BP)

The Big Field
Attendance: 800
Referee: Phillip Russell

6 September 2025
15:00

(1 BP) Esher	24 – 12	Sevenoaks

Molesey Road
Attendance: 476
Referee: Simon Waite

6 September 2025
15:00

(1 BP) Old Albanian	27 – 19	Bury St Edmunds

Woollam's Playing Fields
Attendance: 368
Referee: Rebecca Piddlestone

6 September 2025
15:00

(1 BP) Oxford Harlequins	22 – 43	Westcombe Park (1 BP)

Horspath Sports Ground
Attendance: 127
Referee: Alex Rose

=== Round 2 ===
13 September 2025
14:00

Guernsey Raiders	22 – 39	Dorking (1 BP)

Footes Lane
Attendance: 326
Referee: Henry Parsons

13 September 2025
14:30

(1 BP) Havant	71 – 15	Oxford Harlequins

Hook's Lane
Attendance: 600
Referee: Phillip Russell

13 September 2025
15:00

Barnes	20 – 20	Henley Hawks

Barn Elms
Attendance: 227
Referee: Tom Bird

13 September 2025
15:00

(2 BP) Bury St Edmunds	43 – 47	Oundle (1 BP)

The Haberden
Attendance: 393
Referee: Peter Buchanan

13 September 2025
15:00

(1 BP) Canterbury	42 – 37	Sevenoaks (2 BP)

The Marine Travel Ground
Attendance: 500
Referee: Nathan Howarth

13 September 2025
15:00

(2 BP) London Welsh	28 – 33	Old Albanian (1 BP)

Old Deer Park
Attendance: 508
Referee: Simon Waite

13 September 2025
15:00

(2 BP) Westcombe Park	29 – 31	Esher (1 BP)

Goddington Dene
Attendance: 230
Referee: Conor Boyle

=== Round 3 ===
20 September 2025
14:00

(1 BP) Esher	40 – 36	Havant (2 BP)

Molesey Road
Attendance: 301
Referee: Alex Rose

20 September 2025
14:00

(1 BP) Old Albanian	87 – 17	Guernsey Raiders

Woollam's Playing Fields
Attendance: 364
Referee: Jack Sargentina

20 September 2025
14:00

(1 BP) Oundle	50 – 38	London Welsh (1 BP)

Occupation Road
Attendance: 315
Referee: Harry Parsons

20 September 2025
15:00

(1 BP) Dorking	21 – 22	Barnes

The Big Field
Attendance: 389
Referee: Simon Waite

20 September 2025
15:00

(1 BP) Henley Hawks	17 – 22	Canterbury

Dry Leas
Attendance: 331
Referee: Conor Boyle

20 September 2025
15:00

(2 BP) Oxford Harlequins	38 – 45	Bury St Edmunds (1 BP)

Horspath Sports Ground
Attendance: 130
Referee: Tom Bird

20 September 2025
15:00

Sevenoaks	27 – 26	Westcombe Park (2 BP)

Knole Paddock
Attendance: 281
Referee: Rebecca Piddlestone

=== Round 4 ===
27 September 2025
14:30

(1 BP) Havant	33 – 48	Sevenoaks (1 BP)

Hook's Lane
Attendance: 487
Referee: Conor Boyle

27 September 2025
15:00

Barnes	22 – 21	Old Albanian (1 BP)

Barn Elms
Attendance: 131
Referee: Max Marshall

27 September 2025
15:00

(1 BP) Bury St Edmunds	43 – 35	Esher (1 BP)

The Haberden
Attendance: 329
Referee: Alex Powdrell

27 September 2025
15:00

Canterbury	30 – 23	Westcombe Park (1 BP)

The Marine Travel Ground
Attendance: 183
Referee: Peter Douglas

27 September 2025
15:00

(1 BP) Guernsey Raiders	24 – 21	Oundle (1 BP)

Footes Lane
Attendance: 531
Referee: Peter Buchanan

27 September 2025
15:00

(2 BP) Henley Hawks	36 – 41	Dorking (1 BP)

Dry Leas
Attendance: 248
Referee: Jack Sargentina

27 September 2025
15:00

(2 BP) London Welsh	22 – 24	Oxford Harlequins

Old Deer Park
Attendance: 477
Referee: Phillip Russell

=== Round 5 ===
4 October 2025
14:00

(1 BP) Oundle	31 – 26	Barnes (2 BP)

Occupation Road
Attendance: 257
Referee: Rebecca Piddleston

4 October 2025
14:00

Oxford Harlequins	19 – 37	Guernsey Raiders (1 BP)

Horspath Sports Ground
Attendance: 132
Referee: Connor Boyle

4 October 2025
15:00

(1 BP) Dorking	31 – 7	Canterbury

The Big Field
Attendance: 487
Referee: Harry Parsons

4 October 2025
15:00

(1 BP) Esher	50 – 33	London Welsh (1 BP)

Molesey Road
Attendance: 920
Referee: Jack Sargentina

4 October 2025
15:00

(1 BP) Old Albanian	31 – 22	Henley Hawks

Woollam's Playing Fields
Attendance: 200
Referee: Alex Rose

4 October 2025
15:00

(1 BP) Sevenoaks	28 – 43	Bury St Edmunds (1 BP)

Knole Paddock
Attendance: 288
Referee: Phillip Russell

4 October 2025
15:00

(1 BP) Westcombe Park	38 – 24	Havant (1 BP)

Goddington Dene
Attendance: 130
Referee: Tom Bird

=== Round 6 ===
11 October 2025
14:00

(1 BP) Guernsey Raiders	45 – 19	Esher

Footes Lane
Attendance: 500 (Note: The Rugby Paper gave 2 attendances for Guernsey's home game against Esher on 11 October - 500 in the match report and 250 on the results page. The match report figure has been used as this is closer to Guernsey's average attendance.)
Referee: Tom Bird

11 October 2025
15:00

(1 BP) Barnes	52 – 5	Oxford Harlequins

Barn Elms
Attendance: 135
Referee: Harry Parsons

11 October 2025
15:00

(2 BP) Bury St Edmunds	26 – 29	Westcombe Park (1 BP)

The Haberden
Attendance: 473
Referee: Jack Sargentina

11 October 2025
15:00

(1 BP) Canterbury	56 – 26	Havant (1 BP)

Marine Travel Ground
Attendance: 548
Referee: William Foster

11 October 2025
15:00

Dorking	21 – 34	Old Albanian (1 BP)

The Big Field
Attendance: 339 (Note: The Rugby Paper gave 2 attendances for Dorking's home game against Old Albanian on 11 October - 339 in the match report and 512 on the results page. The match report figure has been used until further notice.)
Referee: Peter Buchanan

11 October 2025
15:00

(2 BP) Henley Hawks	29 – 33	Oundle (1 BP)

Dry Leas
Attendance: 231
Referee: Peter Connor

11 October 2025
15:00

(1 BP) London Welsh	34 – 24	Sevenoaks

Old Deer Park
Attendance: 611
Referee: Simon Waite

=== Round 7 ===
18 October 2025
14:00

Oundle	22 – 19	Dorking (1 BP)

Occupation Road
Attendance: 275
Referee: Phillip Russell

18 October 2025
14:30

(1 BP) Havant	28 – 36	Bury St Edmunds (1 BP)

Hook's Lane
Attendance: 751
Referee: Conor Boyle

18 October 2025
14:30

(2 BP) Sevenoaks	41 – 45	Guernsey Raiders (1 BP)

Knole Paddock
Attendance: 300
Referee: George Jones

18 October 2025
15:00

(1 BP) Esher	28 – 36	Barnes (1 BP)

Moseley Road
Attendance: 720
Referee: Simon Waite

18 October 2025
15:00

(1 BP) Old Albanian	43 – 31	Canterbury (1 BP)

Woollam's Playing Fields
Attendance: 282
Referee: Alexander Rose

18 October 2025
15:00

(1 BP) Oxford Harlequins	33 – 17	Henley Hawks

Horspath Sports Ground
Attendance: 212
Referee: Peter Buchanan

18 October 2025
15:00

(1 BP) Westcombe Park	59 – 14	London Welsh

Goddington Dene
Attendance: 500
Referee: Harry Parsons

=== Round 8 ===
25 October 2025
14:30

(1 BP) Guernsey Raiders	38 – 22	Westcombe Park (1 BP)

Footes Lane
Attendance: 200
Referee: Phillip Russell

25 October 2025
15:00

(1 BP) Barnes	43 – 24	Sevenoaks

Barn Elms
Attendance: 236
Referee: Jack Sargentina

25 October 2025
15:00

(2 BP) Canterbury	40 – 43	Bury St Edmunds (1 BP)

Marine Travel Ground
Attendance: 525
Referee: Tom Bird

25 October 2025
15:00

(1 BP) Dorking	77 – 7	Oxford Harlequins

The Big Field
Attendance: 420
Referee: Rebecca Piddlestone

25 October 2025
15:00

(1 BP) Henley Hawks	47 – 12	Esher

Dry Leas
Attendance: 306
Referee: Conor Boyle

25 October 2025
15:00

(1 BP) London Welsh	46 – 32	Havant (1 BP)

Old Deer Park
Attendance: 1,019
Referee: Peter Buchanan

25 October 2025
15:00

(1 BP) Old Albanian	49 – 28	Oundle (1 BP)

Woollam's Playing Fields
Attendance: 347
Referee: George Jones

=== Round 9 ===
8 November 2025
14:00

(1 BP) Oundle	31 – 24	Canterbury (1 BP)

Occupation Road
Attendance: 290
Referee: George Jones

8 November 2025
14:00

Sevenoaks	27 – 26	Henley Hawks (2 BP)

Knole Paddock
Attendance: 202 (Note: The Rugby Paper failed to give an attendance for Sevenoaks v Henley Hawks on 8 November 2025. Crowd figure provided by Sevenoaks RFC from RFU match result card.)
Referee: Connor Boyle

8 November 2025
14:00

(1 BP) Westcombe Park	36 – 26	Barnes (1 BP)

Goddington Dene
Attendance: 140
Referee: Alex Rose

8 November 2025
14:30

(1 BP) Havant	45 – 45	Guernsey Raiders (1 BP)

Hook's Lane
Attendance: 743
Referee: Tom Bird

8 November 2025
15:00

(1 BP) Bury St Edmunds	47 – 42	London Welsh (2 BP)

The Haberden
Attendance: 543
Referee: Phillip Russell

8 November 2025
15:00

(1 BP) Esher	15 – 20	Dorking

Molesey Road
Attendance: 702
Referee: Peter Buchanan

8 November 2025
15:00

Oxford Harlequins	14 – 53	Old Albanian (1 BP)

Horspath Sports Ground
Attendance: 113
Referee: Peter Connor

=== Round 10 ===
15 November 2025
14:00

(1 BP) Barnes	40 – 19	Havant

Barn Elms
Attendance: 135
Referee: Peter Buchanan

15 November 2025
14:00

(1 BP) Oxford Harlequins	28 – 69	Oundle (1 BP)

Horspath Sports Ground (Note: Oxford Harlequins v Oundle on 15 November 2025 was originally a home fixture for Oundle but was switched to Oxford due to heavy rain with the return fixture on 14 March 2025 being played at Oundle.)
Attendance: 263
Referee: Simon Waite

15 November 2025
14:15

(1 BP) Dorking	45 – 17	Sevenoaks

The Big Field
Attendance: 453
Referee: Tom Bird

15 November 2025
15:00

(1 BP) Canterbury	31 – 24	London Welsh (2 BP)

The Marine Travel Ground
Attendance: 550
Referee: Alexander Rose

15 November 2025
15:00

Guernsey Raiders	21 – 16	Bury St Edmunds (1 BP)

Footes Lane
Attendance: 850
Referee: Conor Boyle

15 November 2025
15:00

(1 BP) Henley Hawks	14 – 21	Westcombe Park

Dry Leas
Attendance: 218
Referee: Harry Parsons

15 November 2025
15:00

(1 BP) Old Albanian	55 – 34	Esher (1 BP)

Woollam's Playing Fields
Attendance: 248
Referee: Philip Russell

=== Round 11 ===
22 November 2025
14:00

(1 BP) London Welsh	42 – 17	Guernsey Raiders

Old Deer Park
Attendance: 382
Referee: George Jones

22 November 2025
14:00

(1 BP) Sevenoaks	45 – 12	Old Albanian

Knole Paddock
Attendance: 358
Referee: Peter Buchanan

22 November 2025
14:00

Westcombe Park	12 – 22	Dorking

Goddington Dene
Attendance: 130
Referee: Simon Waite

22 November 2025
14:30

Havant	16 – 8	Henley Hawks

Hook's Lane
Attendance: 416
Referee: Alex Rose

22 November 2025
15:00

Bury St Edmunds	24 – 15	Barnes

The Haberden
Attendance: 453
Referee: Rebecca Piddlestone

22 November 2025
15:00

Esher	11 – 35	Oundle (1 BP)

Molesey Road
Attendance: 512
Referee: Conor Boyle

22 November 2025
15:00

Oxford Harlequins	19 – 42	Canterbury (1 BP)

Horspath Sports Ground
Attendance: 126
Referee: Harry Parsons

=== Round 12 ===
6 December 2025
14:00

(1 BP) Barnes	0 – 7	London Welsh

Barn Elms
Attendance: 415
Referee: Jack Sargentina

6 December 2025
14:00

(1 BP) Canterbury	34 – 8	Guernsey Raiders

The Marine Travel Ground
Attendance: 985
Referee: Harry Parsons

6 December 2025
14:00

(1 BP) Dorking	41 – 10	Havant

The Big Field
Attendance: 320
Referee: Tom Bird

6 December 2025
14:00

(1 BP) Oundle	41 – 36	Sevenoaks (2 BP)

Occupation Road
Attendance: 320
Referee: Phillip Russell

6 December 2025
15:00

Henley Hawks	18 – 54	Bury St Edmunds (1 BP)

Dry Leas
Attendance: 244
Referee: Simon Waite

6 December 2025
15:00

(1 BP) Old Albanian	31 – 40	Westcombe Park (1 BP)

Woollam's Playing Fields
Attendance: 347
Referee: Ben Piddlestone

6 December 2025
16:00

Oxford Harlequins	17 – 76	Esher (1 BP)

Horspath Sports Ground
Attendance: 164
Referee: Peter Buchanan

=== Round 13 ===
13 December 2025
14:00

Guernsey Raiders	21 – 29	Barnes (1 BP)

Footes Lane
Attendance: 531
Referee: Richard Collis

13 December 2025
14:00

(1 BP) London Welsh	36 – 32	Henley Hawks (2 BP)

Old Deer Park
Attendance: 871
Referee: Tom Bird

13 December 2025
14:00

(1 BP) Sevenoaks	61 – 19	Oxford Harlequins

Knole Paddock
Attendance: 316
Referee: George Jones

13 December 2025
14:00

(2 BP) Westcombe Park	24 – 31	Oundle (1 BP)

Goddington Dene
Attendance: 200
Referee: Peter Buchanan

13 December 2025
14:30

Havant	19 – 33	Old Albanian (1 BP)

Hook's Lane
Attendance: 873
Referee: Phillip Russell

13 December 2025
15:00

(2 BP) Esher	29 – 33	Canterbury (1 BP)

Moseley Road
Attendance: 620
Referee: Mark Hyde

13 December 2025
15:30

(1 BP) Bury St Edmunds	29 – 17	Dorking

The Haberden
Attendance: 523
Referee: Connor Boyle

=== Round 14 ===
20 December 2025
14:00

(1 BP) Dorking	29 – 12	Guernsey Raiders

The Big Field
Attendance: 420
Referee: Philip Russell

20 December 2025
14:00

(1 BP) Oundle	29 – 29	Bury St Edmunds (1 BP)

Occupation Road
Attendance: 353
Referee: Rebecca Piddlestone

20 December 2025
14:00

Sevenoaks	17 – 39	Canterbury (1 BP)

Knole Paddock
Attendance: 389
Referee: Harry Parsons

20 December 2025
15:00

(1 BP) Esher	37 – 35	Westcombe Park (2 BP)

Molesey Road
Attendance: 451
Referee: Gavin Scott

20 December 2025
15:00

Henley Hawks	24 – 21	Barnes (1 BP)

Dry Leas
Attendance: 329
Referee: Peter Buchanan

20 December 2025
15:00

(1 BP) Old Albanian	57 – 17	London Welsh

Woollam's Playing Fields
Attendance: 416
Referee: George Jones

20 December 2025
15:00

(1 BP) Oxford Harlequins	26 – 48	Havant (1 BP)

Horspath Sports Ground
Attendance: 203
Referee: Simon Waite

=== Round 15 ===
10 January 2026
14:00

Barnes	23 – 18	Dorking (1 BP)

Barn Elms
Attendance: 297
Referee: Rebecca Piddlestone

10 January 2026
14:00

(1 BP) London Welsh	24 – 52	Oundle (1 BP)

Old Deer Park
Attendance: 507
Referee: Jack Sarantina

10 January 2026
14:00

Westcombe Park	20 – 12	Sevenoaks

Goddington Dene
Attendance: 350
Referee: Max Marshall

10 January 2026
14:30

(1 BP) Havant	32 – 21	Esher

Hook's Lane
Attendance: 931
Referee: Connor Boyle

10 January 2026
15:00

(1 BP) Bury St Edmunds	74 – 12	Oxford Harlequins

The Haberden
Attendance: 439
Referee: Joshua Bamber

10 January 2026
15:00

(1 BP) Canterbury	28 – 21	Henley Hawks (1 BP)

The Marine Travel Ground
Attendance: 402
Referee: Tom Bird

10 January 2026
15:00

(2 BP) Guernsey Raiders	35 – 42	Old Albanian (1 BP)

Footes Lane
Attendance: 600
Referee: Simon Waite

=== Round 16 ===
17 January 2026
14:00

Dorking	13 – 13	Henley Hawks

The Big Field
Attendance: 610
Referee: Alex Rose

17 January 2026
14:00

(1 BP) Oundle	35 – 17	Guernsey Raiders

Occupation Road
Attendance: 340
Referee: Tom Bird

17 January 2026
14:00

Sevenoaks	25 – 54	Havant (1 BP)

Knole Paddock
Attendance: 360
Referee: George Jones

17 January 2026
14:00

Westcombe Park	12 – 21	Canterbury

Goddington Dene
Attendance: 180
Referee: Rebecca Piddlestone

17 January 2026
15:00

Esher	19 – 47	Bury St Edmunds (1 BP)

Molesey Road
Attendance: 820
Referee: Peter Buchanan

17 January 2026
15:00

(1 BP) Old Albanian	28 – 22	Barnes (1 BP)

Woollam's Playing Fields
Attendance: 347
Referee: Jack Sargentina

17 January 2026
15:00

(2 BP) Oxford Harlequins	28 – 31	London Welsh (1 BP)

Horspath Sports Ground
Attendance: 307
Referee: Conor Boyle

=== Round 17 ===
24 January 2026
14:00

(1 BP) Barnes	15 – 21	Oundle

Barn Elms
Attendance: 357
Referee: Philip Russell

24 January 2026
14:00

(1 BP) Guernsey Raiders	26 – 3	Oxford Harlequins

Footes Lane
Attendance: 869
Referee: Max Marshall

24 January 2026
14:00

(1 BP) London Welsh	31 – 29	Esher (2 BP)

Old Deer Park
Attendance: 808
Referee: Rebecca Piddlestone

24 January 2026
14:30

(1 BP) Havant	39 – 27	Westcombe Park (1 BP)

Hook's Lane
Attendance: 981
Referee: Tom Bird

24 January 2026
15:00

(1 BP) Bury St Edmunds	49 – 24	Sevenoaks (1 BP)

The Haberden
Attendance: 527
Referee: Conor Boyle

24 January 2026
15:00

(1 BP) Canterbury	40 – 7	Dorking

The Marine Travel Ground
Attendance: 859
Referee: David Charlton

24 January 2026
15:00

Henley Hawks	17 – 26	Old Albanian (1 BP)

Dry Leas
Attendance: 307
Referee: Harry Parsons

=== Round 18 ===
31 January 2026
14:00

Oundle	21 – 3	Henley Hawks

Occupation Road
Attendance: 278
Referee: Harry Parsons

31 January 2026
14:00

Sevenoaks	22 – 15	London Welsh (1 BP)

Knole Paddock
Attendance: 495
Referee: Phillip Russell

31 January 2026
14:00

(1 BP) Westcombe Park	30 – 29	Bury St Edmunds (2 BP)

Goddington Dene
Attendance: 120
Referee: Simon Waite

31 January 2026
14:30

(1 BP) Havant	28 – 21	Canterbury (1 BP)

Hook's Lane
Attendance: 1,009
Referee: Jack Sargentina

31 January 2026
14:35

(1 BP) Esher	17 – 19	Guernsey Raiders

Molesey Road
Attendance: 720
Referee: Alex Rose

31 January 2026
15:00

(1 BP) Old Albanian	45 – 38	Dorking (2 BP)

Woollam's Playing Fields
Attendance: 434
Referee: Conor Boyle

31 January 2026
15:00

(1 BP) Oxford Harlequins	26 – 53	Barnes (1 BP)

Horspath Sports Ground
Attendance: 224
Referee: Tom Bird

=== Round 19 ===
14 February 2026
14:00

(1 BP) Barnes	40 – 22	Esher

Barn Elms
Attendance: 197
Referee: Conor Boyle

14 February 2026
14:00

Guernsey Raiders	21 – 12	Sevenoaks

Footes Lane
Attendance: 896
Referee: Harry Parsons

14 February 2026
14:00

(1 BP) London Welsh	44 – 22	Westcombe Park

Old Deer Park
Attendance: 397
Referee: Peter Buchanan

14 February 2026
14:45

Dorking	21 – 21	Oundle

The Big Field
Attendance: 448 (Note: The Rugby Paper gave 2 attendances for Dorking v Oundle on 14 February 2026, 448 on the match report and 450 on the results page. The match report figure has been used.)
Referee: Phillip Russell

14 February 2026
15:00

(1 BP) Bury St Edmunds	68 – 14	Havant

The Haberden
Attendance: 263
Referee: Tom Bird

14 February 2026
15:00

(1 BP) Canterbury	24 – 27	Old Albanian

The Marine Travel Ground
Attendance: 225 (Note: The Rugby Paper gave 2 attendances for Canterbury v Old Albanian, 197 on the match report and 225 on the results page. As the match report attendance is the same as Barnes v Esher on the same day, the results figure is used until further notice.)
Referee: Simon Waite

14 February 2026
15:00

(1 BP) Henley Hawks	54 – 12	Oxford Harlequins

Dry Leas
Attendance: 267
Referee: Max Marshall

=== Round 20 ===
21 February 2026
14:00

(1 BP) Oundle	45 – 14	Old Albanian

Occupation Road
Attendance: 450
Referee: Phillip Russell

21 February 2026
14:30

Havant	24 – 20	London Welsh (1 BP)

Hook's Lane
Attendance: 977
Referee: Rebecca Piddlestone

21 February 2026
14:30

(1 BP) Sevenoaks	8 – 10	Barnes

Knole Paddock
Attendance: 218
Referee: Peter Buchanan

21 February 2026
14:30

(1 BP) Westcombe Park	47 – 22	Guernsey Raiders (1 BP)

Goddington Dene
Attendance: 150
Referee: Alex Rose

21 February 2026
15:00

Esher	22 – 17	Henley Hawks (1 BP)

Molesey Road
Attendance: 470
Referee: Tom Bird

21 February 2026
15:00

(1 BP) Oxford Harlequins	24 – 65	Dorking (1 BP)

Horspath Sports Ground
Attendance: 262
Referee: George Jones

21 February 2026
16:00

(1 BP) Bury St Edmunds	27 – 10	Canterbury

The Haberden
Attendance: 517
Referee: Mark Hyde

=== Round 21 ===
28 February 2026
14:00

(1 BP) Barnes	47 – 24	Westcombe Park (1 BP)

Barn Elms
Attendance: 178
Referee: Simon Waite

28 February 2026
14:00

(1 BP) Guernsey Raiders	36 – 26	Havant (1 BP)

Footes Lane
Attendance: 202
Referee: Peter Buchanan

28 February 2026
14:00

London Welsh	22 – 64	Bury St Edmunds (1 BP)

Old Deer Park
Attendance: 635
Referee: Harry Parsons

28 February 2026
14:30

(1 BP) Dorking	30 – 5	Esher

The Big Field
Attendance: 550
Referee: Tom Bird

28 February 2026
15:00

(1 BP) Canterbury	51 – 33	Oundle (1 BP)

The Marine Travel Ground
Attendance: 440
Referee: Rebecca Piddlestone

28 February 2026
15:00

(1 BP) Henley Hawks	45 – 26	Sevenoaks (1 BP)

Dry Leas
Attendance: 364
Referee: Alex Rose

28 February 2026
15:00

(1 BP) Old Albanian	54 – 29	Oxford Harlequins (1 BP)

Woollam's Playing Fields
Attendance: 347
Referee: Philip Russell

=== Round 22 ===
14 March 2026
14:00

(1 BP) Oundle	71 – 21	Oxford Harlequins

Occupation Road
Attendance: 278
Referee: Harry Parsons

14 March 2026
14:30

(1 BP) Esher	41 – 34	Old Albanian (2 BP)

Molesey Road
Attendance: 460
Referee: George Jones

14 March 2026
14:30

(1 BP) Havant	48 – 38	Barnes (1 BP)

Hook's Lane
Attendance: 1,123
Referee: Phillip Russell

14 March 2026
14:30

(1 BP) Westcombe Park	19 – 25	Henley Hawks

Goddington Dene
Attendance: 220
Referee: Joshua Bamber

14 March 2026
15:00

(1 BP) Bury St Edmunds	69 – 14	Guernsey Raiders

The Haberden
Attendance: 523
Referee: Simon Waite

14 March 2026
15:00

London Welsh	22 – 21	Canterbury (1 BP)

Old Deer Park
Attendance: 346
Referee: Peter Buchanan

14 March 2026
15:00

Sevenoaks	21 – 44	Dorking (1 BP)

Knole Paddock
Attendance: 287
Referee: Jack Sargentina

=== Round 23 ===
21 March 2026
14:00

(1 BP) Barnes	24 – 50	Bury St Edmunds (1 BP)

Barn Elms
Attendance: 228
Referee: Peter Buchanan

21 March 2026
14:00

(1 BP) Guernsey Raiders	62 – 29	London Welsh (1 BP)

Footes Lane
Attendance: 650
Referee: William Foster

21 March 2026
14:00

(1 BP) Oundle	43 – 38	Esher (2 BP)

Occupation Road
Attendance: 425 (Note: The Rugby Paper listed 2 attendances for Oundle v Esher on 21 March - 425 on the match report and 258 on the results page. The match report figure will be used until further notice.)
Referee: Simon Waite

21 March 2026
15:00

Canterbury	P – P	Oxford Harlequins

The Marine Travel Ground

- Postponed due to 2026 Kent meningitis outbreak. Game to be rescheduled for 2 May 2026.

21 March 2026
15:00

(1 BP) Dorking	43 – 40	Westcombe Park (2 BP)

The Big Field
Attendance: 435
Referee: Conor Boyle

21 March 2026
15:00

(1 BP) Henley Hawks	49 – 38	Havant (1 BP)

Dry Leas
Attendance: 353
Referee: George Jones

21 March 2026
15:00

(2 BP) Old Albanian	33 – 39	Sevenoaks (1 BP)

Woollam's Playing Fields
Attendance: 254
Referee: Not listed (Note: The Rugby Paper did not list a referee for Old Albanian v Sevenoaks on 21 March 2026.)

=== Round 24 ===
11 April 2026
14:30

(1 BP) Havant	43 – 39	Dorking (2 BP)

Hook's Lane
Attendance: 957
Referee: Joshua Bamber

11 April 2026
15:00

(1 BP) Bury St Edmunds	33 – 28	Henley Hawks (2 BP)

The Haberden
Attendance: 719
Referee: Simon Waite

11 April 2026
15:00

(1 BP) Esher	78 – 7	Oxford Harlequins

Molesey Road
Attendance: 431
Referee: Max Marshall

11 April 2026
15:00

(2 BP) Guernsey Raiders	29 – 33	Canterbury (1 BP)

Footes Lane
Attendance: 700
Referee: Conor Boyle

11 April 2026
15:00

(1 BP) London Welsh	15 – 22	Barnes

Old Deer Park
Attendance: 886
Referee: Phillip Russell

11 April 2026
15:00

(2 BP) Sevenoaks	28 – 31	Oundle (1 BP)

Knole Paddock
Attendance: 560
Referee: William Foster

11 April 2026
15:00

(1 BP) Westcombe Park	52 – 31	Old Albanian (1 BP)

Goddington Dene
Attendance: 230
Referee: Thomas Bird

=== Round 25 ===
18 April 2026
14:00

(1 BP) Barnes	36 – 14	Guernsey Raiders

Barn Elms
Attendance: 326
Referee: Angus Nickol

18 April 2026
15:00

(1 BP) Canterbury	34 – 33	Esher (2 BP)

The Marine Travel Ground
Attendance: 280
Referee: Thomas Bird

18 April 2026
15:00

Dorking	14 – 35	Bury St Edmunds (1 BP)

The Big Field
Attendance: 680
Referee: Phillip Russell

18 April 2026
15:00

(1 BP) Henley Hawks	28 – 17	London Welsh

Dry Leas
Attendance: 654
Referee: Harry Parsons

18 April 2026
15:00

(1 BP) Old Albanian	81 – 19	Havant

Woollam's Playing Fields
Attendance: 317
Referee: William Foster

18 April 2026
15:00

(1 BP) Oundle	36 – 33	Westcombe Park (2 BP)

Occupation Road
Attendance: 542
Referee: George Jones

18 April 2026
15:00

(1 BP) Oxford Harlequins	28 – 61	Sevenoaks (1 BP)

Horspath Sports Ground
Attendance: 248
Referee: Joshua Bamber

- Sevenoaks are relegated.

=== Round 26 ===
25 April 2026
15:00

(1 BP) Bury St Edmunds	95 – 28	Old Albanian (1 BP)

The Haberden
Attendance: 1,357
Referee: Jack Sargentina

- Bury St Edmunds are promoted.

25 April 2026
15:00

(2 BP) Canterbury	29 – 31	Barnes (1 BP)

The Marine Travel Ground
Attendance: 517
Referee: Simon Waite

25 April 2026
15:00

Guernsey Raiders	19 – 57	Henley Hawks (1 BP)

Footes Lane
Attendance: 750
Referee: George Jones

25 April 2026
15:00

(1 BP) Havant	29 – 39	Oundle (1 BP)

Hook's Lane
Attendance: 1,156
Referee: Connor Boyle

25 April 2026
15:00

(1 BP) London Welsh	42 – 19	Dorking

Old Deer Park
Attendance: 917
Referee: Harry Parsons

25 April 2026
15:00

Sevenoaks	21 – 78	Esher (1 BP)

Knole Paddock
Attendance: 650
Referee: Peter Buchanan

25 April 2026
15:00

(1 BP) Westcombe Park	88 – 29	Oxford Harlequins (1 BP)

Goddington Dene
Attendance: 300
Referee: Alex Rose

=== Round 23 (rescheduled) ===
2 May 2026
15:00

(1 BP) Canterbury	94 – 0	Oxford Harlequins

The Marine Travel Ground
Attendance: 623 (Note: The Rugby Paper had 2 attendances for Canterbury v Oxford Harlequins on 2 May 2026 - 623 on the match report and 413 on the results. The match report figure will be used until further notice.)
Referee: Mark Hyde

- Game rescheduled from 21 March 2026.

== Play-offs ==
=== National 2 Promotion Play-offs ===
The club that finished 11th in National League 1 would contest a playoff with the runners up of National League 2 East, National League 2 North and National League 2 West, with the National 1 club playing the National 2 club with the poorest league record and the other National League 2 clubs playing each other. Home advantage was given first to the highest league level and then the better league record.

9th May 2026
15:00

Birmingham Moseley (N1)	60 – 15	Luctonians (N2W)

Billesley Common
Attendance: 1,192
Referee: George Ounsley

9th May 2026
15:00

Tynedale (N2N)	20 – 29	Oundle (N2E)

Tynedale Park
Attendance: 820
Referee: Samuel Yates

=== National 1 Accession Final ===
The winners of the National 2 Promotion play-offs would face one another to decide who would be the final side to make up the 2026–27 National League 1.

16th May 2026
15:00

Birmingham Moseley (N1)	19 – 15	Oundle (N2E)

Billesley Common
Attendance: 1,113
Referee: Ben Simpson

- Birmingham Moseley remain in National League 1.

=== National League 2 East Accession Final ===
The winner of the Regional 1 South East and Regional 1 South Central promotion play-off would play away at 12th placed Henley Hawks to decide who would be the final side to make up the 2026–27 National League 2 East.

9th May 2026
15:00

Henley Hawks (N2E)	43 – 7	Tunbridge Wells (R1SC)

Dry Leas
Attendance: 810
Referee: Daniel Woods

- Henley Hawks remain in the division.

== Attendances ==
- Does not include promotion/relegation play-offs.

Club	Home Games	Total	Average	Highest	Lowest	% Capacity
Barnes	13	3,065	236	415	131	24%
Bury St Edmunds	13	7,059	543	1,357	263	18%
Canterbury	13	6,637	511	985	183	34%
Dorking	13	6,351	489	800	320	33%
Esher	13	7,603	585	920	301	17%
Guernsey Raiders	13	7,605	585	896	200	12%
Havant	13	11,004	846	1,156	416	56%
Henley Hawks	13	4,075	313	654	218	8%
London Welsh	13	8,364	643	1,019	346	11%
Old Albanian	13	4,271	329	434	200	33%
Oundle	13	4,304	331	542	181	33%
Oxford Harlequins	13	2,511	193	307	113	19%
Sevenoaks	13	4,704	362	650	202	36%
Westcombe Park	13	2,880	222	500	120	7%

== Individual statistics ==
- Does not include promotion/relegation play-offs.

=== Top points scorers ===
Rank	Player	Team	Points
1	Benjamin Penfold	Bury St Edmunds	286
2	Benjamin Adams	Sevenoaks	256
3	Frank Reynolds	Canterbury	241
4	Thomas Hardwick	Dorking	236
5	Joel Knight	Havant	191
6	Benjamin Young	Oundle	190
7	Matthew Hodgson	London Welsh	188
8	Elliot McPhun	Old Albanian	165
9	James Botterill	Esher	160
10	Max Brown	Westcombe Park	152

=== Top try scorers ===
Rank	Player	Team	Tries
1	James Botterill	Esher	32
2	Grant Snelling	Oundle	24
3	Eoin O'Donoghue	Canterbury	21
3	Daniel Robertshaw	Barnes	21
4	Ben Alexander	Old Albanian	20
4	Rian Hamilton	Guernsey Raiders	20
4	Will Perry	Havant	20
5	Andrew Denham	Bury St Edmunds	19
6	Clark Macfarlane	Bury St Edmunds	18
6	Alex Noot	Old Albanian	18

== Team of the Season ==
FB	15	Alex Noot (Old Albanians)
RW	14	Rian Hamilton (Oundle)
OC	13	Matt Hema (Bury St Edmunds)
IC	12	Samir Kharbouch (Bury St Edmunds)
LW	11	James Botterill (Esher)
FH	10	Ben Penfold (Bury St Edmunds)
SH	9	Lewis Finlay (Oundle)
N8	8	Nick Cook (Westcombe Park)
OF	7	Trystan Andrews (Bury St Edmunds)
BF	6	George Grigg-Pettitt (Bury St Edmunds)
RL	5	Kieran Frost (Oundle)
LL	4	Ben Sams (Bury St Edmunds)
TP	3	Ben Cooper (Bury St Edmunds)
HK	2	Grant Snelling (Oundle)
LP	1	Harry Morley (Oundle)

Head Coach/DOR James Shanahan (Bury St Edmunds)

== See also ==
- 2025–26 Champ Rugby
- 2025–26 National League 1
- 2025–26 National League 2 North
- 2025–26 National League 2 West
