= Regional 1 South Central =

Level five rugby union league in England

- Current season or competition: 2025–26 Regional 1 South Central
- Sport: Rugby union
- Instituted: 2022; 4 years ago
- Number of teams: 12
- Country: England; Jersey
- Holders: Jersey (2025–26 (promoted to National League 2 East))
- Most titles: Wimbledon; Havant; London Welsh; Jersey (1 title)
- Website: London & SE Division

Regional 1 South Central is a level five league in the English rugby union system, with the twelve teams drawn from across southern and South East England. The other level five leagues are Regional 1 Midlands, Regional 1 North East, Regional 1 North West, Regional 1 South East and Regional 1 South West. Prior to 2022, Regional 1 South Central and Regional 1 South East were part of a unified level five league known as London & South East Premier.

Jersey are the 2025-26 champions and are promoted to National League 2 East

== Format ==
The twelve teams in this league are drawn from across southern England, with the league champions promoted to National 2 East. The league's bottom two teams are relegated to either Regional 2 Thames or Regional 2 South Central depending on their geographic location. Play-offs were introduced in 2025–26, with the second and third-placed teams playing each other for the right to play in the NLR Accession Final, while the losing team in the play-off between the ninth and tenth placed teams play in the Regional 1 Accession Final.

The season runs from September to April and comprises twenty-two rounds of matches, with each club playing each of its rivals home and away. The results of the matches contribute points to the league table as follows:

- 4 points are awarded for a win
- 2 points are awarded for a draw
- 0 points are awarded for a loss, however
- 1 losing (bonus) point is awarded to a team that loses a match by 7 points or fewer
- 1 additional (bonus) point is awarded to a team scoring 4 tries or more in a match

== 2026–27 season ==
Departing were Jersey, promoted to National 2 East while Hammersmith & Fulham (11th) and Camberley (12th) were relegated to Regional 2 South East and Regional 2 South Central respectively. Incoming teams were Sevenoaks relegated from National 2 East and Bournemouth and Brunel University, promoted from Regional 2 South Central and Regional 2 Thames respectively.

=== Participating teams and locations ===
Team	Ground	Capacity	City/Area	Previous season
Bournemouth	Chapel Gate	1,500	Christchurch, Dorset	Promoted from Regional 2 South Central (champions)
Bracknell	Lily Hill Park	1,250 (250 seats)	Bracknell, Berkshire	6th
Brunel University	Brunel University Sports Park		Uxbridge, London	Promoted from Regional 2 Thames (champions)
CS Rugby 1863	King's House Sports Ground		Chiswick, London	5th
Farnham	Wilkinson Way		Farnham, Surrey	7th
London Scottish Lions	King's House Sports Ground		Chiswick, London	2nd
Maidenhead	Braywick Park	1,750 (250 seats)	Maidenhead, Berkshire	10th
Old Alleynians	The Common		Dulwich, London	4th
Sevenoaks	Knole Paddock	1,000	Sevenoaks, Kent	Relegated from National 2 East (13th)
Tunbridge Wells	St Marks Recreation Ground	3,000	Royal Tunbridge Wells, Kent	3rd
Wimbledon	Beverley Meads	1,000	Wimbledon, London	9th
Worthing Raiders	Roundstone Lane	1,500 (100 seats)	Angmering, West Sussex	8th

Locations of the 2026–27 Regional 1 South Central teams in London
Locations of the 2026–27 Regional 1 South Central teams

== 2025–26 ==
Departing were London Welsh, promoted to National 2 East, while Brighton (11th) and Horsham (12th) were relegated to Regional 2 South East. Incoming teams were Worthing Raiders relegated from National League 2 East, while Farnham and London Scottish Lions were promoted, as champions, from Regional 2 South Central and Regional 2 Thames respectively.

=== Participating teams and locations ===
Team	Ground	Capacity	City/Area	Previous season
Bracknell	Lily Hill Park	1,250 (250 seats)	Bracknell, Berkshire	6th
Camberley	Watchetts Recreation Ground		Camberley, Surrey	4th
CS Rugby 1863	King's House Sports Ground		Chiswick, London	3rd
Farnham	Wilkinson Way		Farnham, Surrey	Promoted from Regional 2SC (champions)
Hammersmith & Fulham	Hurlingham Park		Fulham, London	9th
Jersey	St Peter		Saint Peter, Jersey	2nd
London Scottish Lions	King's House Sports Ground		Chiswick, London	Promoted from Regional 2 Thames (champions)
Maidenhead	Braywick Park	1,750 (250 seats)	Maidenhead, Berkshire	7th
Old Alleynians	The Common		Dulwich, London	8th
Tunbridge Wells	St Marks Recreation Ground	3,000	Royal Tunbridge Wells, Kent	10th
Wimbledon	Beverley Meads	1,000	Wimbledon, London	5th
Worthing Raiders	Roundstone Lane	1,500 (100 seats)	Angmering, West Sussex	Relegated from National 2 East (12th)

Locations of the 2025–26 Regional 1 South Central teams in London
Locations of the 2025–26 Regional 1 South Central teams

=== League table ===
Regional 1 South Central 2025–26
	Team	Played	Won	Drawn	Lost	Points for	Points against	Points diff	Try bonus	Loss bonus	Points
1	Jersey (P)	22	21	0	1	961	408	553	20	1	105
2	London Scottish Lions	22	18	0	4	775	502	273	19	0	91
3	Tunbridge Wells	22	14	1	7	749	512	237	19	5	82
4	Old Alleynians	22	14	0	8	716	617	99	15	1	72
5	CS Stags 1863	22	12	1	9	721	495	226	14	7	71
6	Bracknell	22	11	0	11	562	596	−34	14	6	64
7	Farnham	22	10	0	12	640	646	–6	15	5	60
8	Worthing Raiders	22	10	0	12	596	644	−48	13	3	56
9	Wimbledon	22	9	0	13	661	740	−79	15	3	54
10	Maidenhead	22	5	1	16	521	888	−367	10	2	34
11	Hammersmith & Fulham (R)	22	3	0	19	497	822	−325	10	7	29
12	Camberley (R)	22	3	1	18	531	1060	−529	10	3	27
If teams are level at any stage, tiebreakers are applied in the following order: 1. Number of matches won 2. Number of draws 3. Difference between points for and against 4. Total number of points for 5. Aggregate number of points scored in matches between tied teams 6. Number of matches won excluding the first match, then the second and so on until the tie is settled
Mint background is the promotion place. (1st); Green background is the promotion play-off places. (2nd–3rd); Pink background are the relegation play-off places (9th–10th); Salmon background are the relegation places (subject to confirmation by the RFU). (11th–12th); Updated: 13 April 2026

=== Play-offs ===
The champions are promoted to National 2 East while the winner of the Regional 1 South Central promotion play-off meets the winner of the Regional 1 South East promotion play-off in round 2. The winner of this match plays the 12th placed team of National League 2 East with the winning team playing in next seasons National 2 East. In each match the highest placed team play at home.

Promotion play-offs
Round 1

25 April 2026

London Scottish Lions (2nd)	33 – 40	Tunbridge Wells (3rd)
	Report

Round 2

2 May 2026

Letchworth Garden City (2nd)	33 – 41	Tunbridge Wells (3rd)
	Report

NLR Accession Final

9 May 2026

Henley Hawks	43 – 7	Tunbridge Wells

- Henley remain in National League 2 East

Relegation play-off

25 April 2026

Wimbledon (9th)	64 – 38	Maidenhead (10th)
	Report

Regional 1 Accession Final

9 May 2026

Maidenhead (10th)	35 – 7	H.A.C

- Maidenhead remain in the division

== 2024–25 ==
Departing were Havant, promoted as champions replaced by Wimbledon who were relegated from National League 2 East. Also departing are Bournemouth who were relegated to Regional 2 South Central. Marlborough transferred across to Regional 1 South West. Ordinarily Horsham would have dropped to Regional 2 South East but due to obtaining the highest amount of points across those finishing in a relegation place (11th) they earned a reprieve as the demise of Jersey Reds meant there was a corresponding adjustment across multiple leagues.^{A}

Joining the league are Jersey and Old Alleynians who were promoted as champions of Regional 2 South Central and Regional 2 South East respectively.

=== Participating teams and locations ===
Team	Ground	Capacity	City/Area	Previous season
Bracknell	Lily Hill Park	1,250 (250 seats)	Bracknell, Berkshire	5th
Brighton	Waterhill Playing Fields		Brighton, East Sussex	7th
Camberley	Watchetts Recreation Ground		Camberley, Surrey	2nd
CS Rugby 1863	King's House Sports Ground		Chiswick, London	6th
Hammersmith & Fulham	Hurlingham Park		Fulham, London	10th
Horsham	Coolhurst Ground		Horsham, West Sussex	11th
Jersey	St Peter		Saint Peter, Jersey	Promoted from Regional 2SC (champions)
London Welsh	Old Deer Park	5,850 (1,000 seats)	Richmond, London	3rd
Maidenhead	Braywick Park	1,750 (250 seats)	Maidenhead, Berkshire	8th
Old Alleynians	The Common		Dulwich, London	Promoted from Regional 2SE (champions)
Tunbridge Wells	St Marks Recreation Ground	3,000	Royal Tunbridge Wells, Kent	4th
Wimbledon	Beverley Meads	1,000	Wimbledon, London	Relegated from National 2 East (13th)

Locations of the 2024–25 Regional 1 South Central teams in London
Locations of the 2024–25 Regional 1 South Central teams

=== League table ===
Regional 1 South Central 2024–25
	Team	Played	Won	Drawn	Lost	Points for	Points against	Points diff	Try bonus	Loss bonus	Points
1	London Welsh (P)	22	21	0	1	1041	393	+648	23	0	107
2	Jersey	22	19	0	3	794	455	+339	23	0	99
3	CS Rugby 1863	22	14	2	6	602	407	+195	17	0	77
4	Camberley	22	13	2	7	770	577	+193	18	0	74
5	Wimbledon	22	13	0	9	615	575	+40	15	0	67
6	Bracknell	22	7	3	12	543	639	–96	19	0	53
7	Maidenhead	22	9	1	12	569	724	–155	13	0	51
8	Old Alleynians	22	8	0	14	555	668	–113	18	0	50
9	Hammersmith & Fulham	22	7	0	15	472	731	–259	12	0	40
10	Tunbridge Wells	22	6	1	15	473	748	–275	10	0	36
11	Brighton (R)	22	5	0	17	500	695	–195	15	0	35
12	Horsham (R)	22	5	1	16	405	727	–322	11	0	33
If teams are level at any stage, tiebreakers are applied in the following order: 1. Number of matches won 2. Number of draws 3. Difference between points for and against 4. Total number of points for 5. Aggregate number of points scored in matches between tied teams 6. Number of matches won excluding the first match, then the second and so on until the tie is settled
Green background is the promotion place. Pink background are the relegation places. Updated: 5 April 2025; Source:

== 2023–24 ==
Departing were champions Wimbledon, promoted to National League 2 East, while two teams were relegated - RWB (11th) and Sutton & Epsom (12th) to Regional 2 South Central and Regional 2 South East respectively. Also departing on a level transfer to Regional 1 Midlands were Banbury and Oxford Harlequins.

Three teams were promoted – Hammersmith & Fulham, Horsham and Marlborough from Regional 2 Thames, Regional 2 South East and Regional 2 South Central respectively. CS Rugby 1863 and Tunbridge Wells were both transferred from Regional 1 South East. The remaining seven teams played in this league last season.

=== Participating teams and locations ===
Team	Ground	Capacity	City/Area	Previous season
Bournemouth	Chapel Gate	1,500	Bournemouth, Dorset	7th
Bracknell	Lily Hill Park	1,250 (250 seats)	Bracknell, Berkshire	8th
Brighton	Waterhill Playing Fields		Brighton, East Sussex	9th
Camberley	Watchetts Recreation Ground		Camberley, Surrey	3rd
CS Rugby 1863	King's House Sports Ground		Chiswick, London	Transferred from Regional 1SE (10th)
Hammersmith & Fulham	Hurlingham Park		Fulham, London	Promoted from Regional 2 Thames (1st)
Havant	Hooks Lane Ground	1,500 (500 seats)	Havant, Hampshire	2nd
Horsham	Coolhurst Ground		Horsham, West Sussex	Promoted from Regional 2SE (1st)
London Welsh	Old Deer Park	5,850 (1,000 seats)	Richmond, London	6th
Maidenhead	Braywick Park	1,750 (250 seats)	Maidenhead, Berkshire	5th
Marlborough	The Common		Marlborough, Wiltshire	Promoted from Regional 2SC (1st)
Tunbridge Wells	St Marks Recreation Ground	3,000	Royal Tunbridge Wells, Kent	Transferred from Regional 1SE (6th)

Locations of the 2023–24 Regional 1 South Central teams in London
Locations of the 2023–24 Regional 1 South Central teams

=== League table ===
Regional 1 South Central 2023–24
	Team	Played	Won	Drawn	Lost	Points for	Points against	Points diff	Try bonus	Loss bonus	Points
1	Havant (P)	22	18	1	3	783	496	+287	17	3	94
2	Camberley	22	16	1	5	758	496	+262	18	3	87
3	London Welsh Amateur	22	16	0	6	841	537	+304	17	4	85
4	Tunbridge Wells	22	15	0	7	641	580	+61	17	1	78
5	Bracknell	22	13	0	9	621	487	+134	15	4	71
6	CS Rugby 1863	22	12	0	10	560	444	+116	10	6	64
7	Brighton	22	9	1	12	598	672	–74	15	4	57
8	Maidenhead	22	8	0	14	630	694	−94	13	3	48
9	Marlborough	22	7	0	15	512	656	−144	9	5	42
10	Hammersmith & Fulham	22	6	0	16	508	804	−296	11	3	38
11^{A}	Horsham	22	5	0	17	475	708	−233	9	6	35
12	Bournemouth (R)	22	5	1	16	526	879	−353	8	2	32
If teams are level at any stage, tiebreakers are applied in the following order: 1. Number of matches won 2. Number of draws 3. Difference between points for and against 4. Total number of points for 5. Aggregate number of points scored in matches between tied teams 6. Number of matches won excluding the first match, then the second and so on until the tie is settled
Green background is the promotion place. Pink background are the relegation places. Updated: 6 April 2024; Source:

=== Results ===
Home \ Away	BOU	BRA	BRI	CAM	CSR	HAF	HAV	HOR	LWE	MAI	MAR	TUN
Bournemouth	—	31–38	35–44	5–31	21–10	37–32	31–62	31–30	20–42	40–36	28–43	27–43
Bracknell	38–14	—	38–27	33–26	37–31	41–0	15–22	26–3	12–45	24–10	53–9	31–10
Brighton	39–39	48–29	—	22–24	12–5	25–41	28–31	48–19	22–47	37–27	25–12	24–26
Camberley	54–14	22–17	50–14	—	47–8	48–12	27–21	61–35	33–57	26–8	28–23	17–22
CS Rugby 1863	48–26	15–10	38–5	12–5	—	57–7	22–19	35–15	31–19	41–30	27–10	21–26
Hammersmith & Fulham	40–30	20–25	26–34	28–57	3–49	—	24–34	31–24	38–20	35–26	21–29	31–34
Havant	69–14	33–25	32–15	34–34	36–15	39–27	—	30–26	32–25	44–12	50–19	34–21
Horsham	45–3	19–24	14–31	31–38	7–28	39–21	21–19	—	36–42	38–24	12–5	8–33
London Welsh Amateur	57–12	24–17	37–8	24–30	29–23	48–15	22–27	61–12	—	45–37	48–19	48–33
Maidenhead	41–33	17–47	35–36	31–22	25–19	32–7	24–52	29–17	36–40	—	42–12	67–26
Marlborough	31–32	34–24	41–30	12–37	33–10	27–30	21–29	43–10	13–34	22–26	—	42–24
Tunbridge Wells	15–3	27–17	26–24	33–41	22–15	49–19	28–34	45–14	31–27	31–15	36–21	—

Updated to match(es) played on 6 April 2024. Source: Regional 1 South Central
Legend: Blue = home team win; Yellow = draw; Red = away team win.
For upcoming matches, an "a" indicates there is an article about the rivalry between the two participants.

== 2022–23 ==
This was the first season following the RFU Adult Competition Review. The new league was made up of teams from both the London & SE and South West divisions.

=== Participating teams and locations ===
Team	Ground	Capacity	City/Area	Previous season
Banbury	Bodicote Park	2,500 (250 seats)	Banbury, Oxfordshire	Transferred from SW1E (2nd)
Bournemouth	Chapel Gate		Bournemouth, Dorset	Transferred from SW Premier (8th)
Bracknell	Lily Hill Park	1,250 (250 seats)	Bracknell, Berkshire	Transferred from SW1E (3rd)
Brighton	Waterhill Playing Fields		Brighton, East Sussex	L&SE Premier (12th)
Camberley	Watchetts Recreation Ground		Camberley, Surrey	Promoted from London 1 South (1st)
Havant	Hooks Lane Ground	1,500 (500 seats)	Havant, Hampshire	L&SE Premier (5th)
London Welsh	Old Deer Park	5,850 (1,000 seats)	Richmond, London	Promoted from London 1 South (2nd)
Maidenhead	Braywick Park	1,750 (250 seats)	Maidenhead, Berkshire	L&SE Premier (8th)
Oxford Harlequins	Horspath Sports Ground, Oxford Road	1,000	Horspath, Oxfordshire	Transferred from SW1E (1st)
Royal Wootton Bassett	Ballards Ash Sports Ground		Royal Wootton Bassett, Wiltshire	Transferred from SW Premier (13th)
Sutton & Epsom	Rugby Lane		Epsom, London	L&SE Premier (11th)
Wimbledon	Beverley Meads	1,000	Wimbledon, London	L&SE Premier (7th)

Locations of the 2022–23 Regional 1 South Central teams

=== League table ===
Regional 1 South Central 2022–23
	Team	Played	Won	Drawn	Lost	Points for	Points against	Points diff	Try bonus	Loss bonus	Points
1	Wimbledon (P)	22	21	0	1	959	363	+596	20	1	105
2	Havant	22	18	0	4	733	403	+330	16	3	91
3	Camberley	22	17	1	4	762	478	+284	18	2	90
4	Oxford Harlequins	22	12	2	8	602	629	–27	10	1	63
5	Maidenhead	22	11	0	11	721	592	+129	13	5	62
6	London Welsh Amateur	22	10	1	11	596	612	–16	10	2	54
7	Bournemouth	22	9	0	13	466	596	–130	4	6	46
8	Bracknell	22	7	1	14	472	639	−167	9	3	42
9	Brighton	22	5	2	15	521	663	−142	10	7	41
10	Banbury	22	6	2	14	462	766	−304	8	3	39
11	Royal Wootton Bassett (R)	22	7	1	14	420	656	−236	6	2	38
12	Sutton & Epsom (R)	22	3	2	17	443	760	−317	6	5	27
If teams are level at any stage, tiebreakers are applied in the following order: 1. Number of matches won 2. Number of draws 3. Difference between points for and against 4. Total number of points for 5. Aggregate number of points scored in matches between tied teams 6. Number of matches won excluding the first match, then the second and so on until the tie is settled
Green background is the promotion place. Pink background are the relegation places. Updated: 18 April 2023; Source:

=== Results ===
Home \ Away	BAN	BOU	BRA	BRI	CAM	HAV	LWE	MAI	OXH	RWB	SAE	WIM
Banbury	—	29–10	25–46	21–15	36–24	18–26	24–34	19–31	17–20	28–19	12–12	7–50
Bournemouth	20–21	—	23–17	17–16	20–17	24–28	42–37	10–24	25–12	49–7	28–25	12–49
Bracknell	24–19	17–10	—	22–18	7–31	8–49	28–39	14–29	17–17	40–21	34–14	24–31
Brighton	17–17	22–32	18–22	—	24–26	39–38	27–17	25–23	21–25	33–42	39–22	10–36
Camberley	46–17	53–34	31–19	24–24	—	36–18	42–22	40–15	45–43	36–7	43–21	25–20
Havant	43–26	34–7	28–12	41–23	18–6	—	41–0	34–28	62–24	39–5	50–5	11–16
London Welsh Amateur	51–15	29–22	45–15	50–10	28–58	26–31	—	20–10	22–31	33–10	42–27	7–26
Maidenhead	82–15	36–39	31–5	42–33	17–33	29–34	56–17	—	29–46	48–10	61–24	15–67
Oxford Harlequins	41–24	21–13	24–17	37–31	17–50	5–38	41–22	19–28	—	21–12	67–20	33–54
Royal Wootton Bassett	31–24	20–18	47–29	12–26	19–22	17–24	12–22	24–18	22–22	—	31–29	7–63
Sutton & Epson	22–26	13–8	34–24	42–24	26–50	27–30	15–15	26–45	19–22	5–26	—	5–42
Wimbledon	102–22	69–3	55–31	55–26	26–24	22–16	29–18	38–24	41–14	27–19	41–10	—

Updated to match(es) played on 11 April 2023. Source: Regional 1 South Central
Legend: Blue = home team win; Yellow = draw; Red = away team win.
For upcoming matches, an "a" indicates there is an article about the rivalry between the two participants.

== Regional 1 South Central honours ==
List of Regional 1 South Central honours
Season	No of teams	Champions	Runner–up	Relegated team(s)	Ref
2022–23	12	Wimbledon	Havant	Royal Wootton Bassett and Sutton & Epsom	
2023–24	12	Havant	Camberley	Bournemouth ^{a}	
2024–25	12	London Welsh Amateur	Jersey	Brighton and Horsham	
Green background is the promotion place.

- ^a Owing to the demise of Jersey Reds there was one less relegation place from the level five leagues. Of the six, 11th place teams, Horsham had the highest amount of points and escaped relegation.

== Regional 1 South Central (2025– ) ==
Regional 1 South Central continued to be a tier 5 league. Promotion and relegation play-offs were introduced.

Regional 1 South West
Season	No of teams	No of matches	Champions	2nd	3rd	Relegated teams	Ref
2025–26	12	22	Jersey	London Scottish Lions	Tunbridge Wells	Hammersmith & Fulham (11th) and Camberley (12th)	
Green background is the promotion place.
