= Siam Cup =

Annual rugby competition

- Sport: Rugby union
- Instituted: 1920
- Number of teams: 2
- Country: Jersey and Guernsey
- Holders: Guernsey

The Siam Cup is an annual rugby union competition held between the Channel Islands clubs of Jersey and Guernsey. It was first contested in 1920. The trophy is the second oldest rugby trophy in the world to be contested after the Calcutta Cup.

== Trophy ==
The trophy is a large circular rose-bowl made from coinage of Siam ticals and required the permission of King Rama VI to melt the coins down. The King not only permitted it, he had the trophy created within the Royal Crown Silversmith.

It is beautifully decorated in traditional Siamese style, with figures of dancing girls and elephant heads. It stands on an ebony base and is engraved with the cup winner's names, dating as far back as 1920.

The Cup was brought to the Channel Islands by Lieut-Colonel C H Forty, an officer based in Siam with the Durham Light Infantry. A fellow officer in his regiment was the son of the King of Siam. He was befriended by Forty and his fellow officers, and on eventually becoming King he presented the cup to Forty and his fellow officers as a token of their friendship.

Forty donated the cup to the islands to be played for annually between Victoria College in Jersey and Elizabeth College in Guernsey (These are the CI equivalents to UK Public Schools). When rugby was no longer played by the two colleges it was decided that the cup should be contested between the two island rugby clubs each season, thus began the annual 'battle' for the Siam Cup.

During the German occupation of the Channel Islands by Nazi Germany in the Second World War, the Germans wanted it to be sent to their homeland to be melted down and used as funds to support the Third Reich. Strangely enough the cup 'disappeared' and was not rediscovered until after the end of the occupation. To this day, there is no record of the whereabouts of the cup during this period.

By the 1970s the trophy started to deteriorate from age and a replica was commissioned. The original was handed to the Rugby Football Union in 1977 where it is placed on display at the World Rugby Museum at Twickenham Stadium in London, England.

== Competition ==
The competition has been contested annually since 1920, each island hosting it every other year. The only breaks in competition were due to the Second World War.

Previously there had been no restrictions as to who could play in the Siam Cup. Following Jersey's rise through the English leagues to Level 2 and turning professional it was argued that it made the competition unfair. In 2016, it was declared that Jersey could only select players for the Siam Cup if they had been on the island for three years, Guernsey, playing in a league at Level 5, would be unaffected by the change. Equivalent competitions are held at academy (Fallaize Cup), women's and veterans (Nash Cup) level on the same day.

The centenary edition of the cup, due for 2020, was eventually played in November 2021 due to the COVID-19 pandemic and was narrowly won by Jersey 14–13. It was still referred to as the 2020 competition as both clubs played the 2021 staging of the event in May 2022 a week before the 2022 date.

In recent years the trophy has frequently switch hands. The 2021 edition finished 62–26 to Guernsey who won away for the first time since 2007, a week later they retained the title on home soil. Jersey fought back in 2023 securing a 4–0 result on Siam Cup day, an achievement only completed once before in 2018 by Guernsey. The 2024 edition saw Guernsey secure the title for the third time in 4 matches, also securing a dramatic victory in the women's competition with a last minute penalty to win the game 17–15. The latest edition in 2025 saw Jersey record another 4-0 cup day at home.

As of the 2025 competition, Jersey had won 64 times, with Guernsey winning 19. There has only ever been one draw.
