= National League 2 East =

Level four rugby union league in England

- Current season or competition: 2026–27 National League 2 East
- Sport: Rugby union
- Instituted: 2022; 4 years ago
- Number of teams: 14
- Country: England
- Holders: Bury St Edmunds (2025–26)
- Most titles: Blackheath, Bury St Edmunds, Esher, Tonbridge Juddians (1 title)
- Website: National League 2 East

National League 2 East is a men’s rugby union league at level four in the English rugby union system and provides semi-professional competition for teams in London, South East England, the East of England and the Channel Islands. The remainder of England is covered by two other regional leagues; National League 2 North and National League 2 West.

The champion club is promoted to National One. The last two teams are relegated to either Regional 1 South Central or Regional 1 South East. Prior to the 2022–23 season, National League 2 East and National League 2 West were part of a unified division known as National League 2 South. Bury St Edmunds are the current champions and are promoted to National League 1.

== Structure ==
The league consists of fourteen teams who play the others on a home and away basis, to make a total of 26 matches each. The champions are promoted to National League 1 while the runners up go into a four team National 2 playoffs with the runners up from National League 2 North and National League 2 West and the 11th placed side in National League 1.

The bottom two teams are relegated to Regional 1 South Central or Regional 1 South East while the 12th placed side go into the four team Regional 1 playoffs with the 12th placed sides from National 2 North and National 2 West, as well as the Regional 1 playoff winners.

The results of the matches contribute points to the league as follows:

- 4 points are awarded for a win
- 2 points are awarded for a draw
- 0 points are awarded for a loss, however
- 1 losing (bonus) point is awarded to a team that loses a match by 7 points or fewer
- 1 additional (bonus) point is awarded to a team scoring 4 tries or more in a match.

== Current season ==
=== Participating teams and locations ===
Locations of the 2026–27 National League 2 East teams

Team	Ground	Capacity	City/Area	Previous season
Barnes	Barn Elms	1,000	Barnes, London	4th
Canterbury	Marine Travel Ground	1,500 (75 seats)	Canterbury, Kent	5th
Colchester	Raven Park	1,200	Colchester, Essex	Promoted from Regional 1 South East
Dorking	The Big Field	1,500	Dorking, Surrey	6th
Esher	Molesey Road	3,500	Hersham, Surrey	11th
Guernsey Raiders	Footes Lane	5,000 (720 seats)	Saint Peter Port, Guernsey	10th
Havant	Hook's Lane	1,500 (500 seats)	Havant, Hampshire	8th
Henley Hawks	Dry Leas	4,000	Henley-on-Thames, Oxfordshire	12th
Jersey	St Peter		Saint Peter, Jersey	Promoted from Regional 1 South Central
Leicester Lions	Westleigh Park	2,000	Blaby, Leicestershire	Relegated from National League 1 (14th)
London Welsh	Old Deer Park	5,850 (1,000 seats)	Richmond, London	9th
Old Albanian	Woollam's Playing Fields	1,000	St Albans, Hertfordshire	3rd
Oundle	Occupation Road	1,000	Oundle, Northamptonshire	2nd
Westcombe Park	Goddington Dene	3,200 (200 seats)	Orpington, London	7th

=== League table ===
2026–27 National League 2 East table
Pos	Team	Pld	W	D	L	PF	PA	PD	TB	LB	Pts	Qualification
1	Barnes	0	0	0	0	0	0	0	0	0	0	Promotion place
2	Canterbury	0	0	0	0	0	0	0	0	0	0	Promotion play-off
3	Colchester	0	0	0	0	0	0	0	0	0	0	
4	Dorking	0	0	0	0	0	0	0	0	0	0	
5	Esher	0	0	0	0	0	0	0	0	0	0	
6	Guernsey Raiders	0	0	0	0	0	0	0	0	0	0	
7	Havant	0	0	0	0	0	0	0	0	0	0	
8	Henley Hawks	0	0	0	0	0	0	0	0	0	0	
9	Jersey	0	0	0	0	0	0	0	0	0	0	
10	Leicester Lions	0	0	0	0	0	0	0	0	0	0	
11	London Welsh	0	0	0	0	0	0	0	0	0	0	
12	Old Albanian	0	0	0	0	0	0	0	0	0	0	Relegation play-off
13	Oundle	0	0	0	0	0	0	0	0	0	0	Relegation place
14	Westcombe Park	0	0	0	0	0	0	0	0	0	0	Relegation place

Updated to match(es) played on 1 September 2026. Source: National League Rugby
Rules for classification: If teams are level at any stage, tiebreakers are applied in the following order:
1. Number of matches won
2. Number of matches drawn
3. Difference between points for and against
4. Total number of points for
5. Aggregate number of points scored in matches between tied teams
6. Number of matches won excluding the first match, then the second and so on until the tie is settled

== National Two East honours ==
List of National Two East honours
Season	No of teams	Champions	Runner–up	Relegated teams	Ref
2022–23	14	Blackheath	Barnes	Westcliff, Rochford Hundred	
2023–24	14	Esher	Barnes	North Walsham, Wimbledon	
2024–25	14	Tonbridge Juddians	Dorking	Worthing Raiders, Colchester	
2025–26	14	Bury St Edmunds	Oundle	Oxford Harlequins, Sevenoaks	
2026–27	14				
Green background is the promotion place.

== Number of league titles ==
- Blackheath (1)
- Bury St Edmunds (1)
- Esher (1)
- Tonbridge Juddians (1)

== See also ==
- English rugby union system
- History of the English rugby union system
- National League 2 North
- National League 2 West
