= Maidenhead RFC =

English rugby union team, based in Berkshire

Maidenhead
- Full name: Maidenhead Rugby Football Club
- Union: Berkshire RFU
- Founded: 1922; 104 years ago
- Region: Berkshire
- Ground: Braywick Park (Capacity: 1,750 - covered seating 250, uncovered standing 1500)
- Chairman: Stephen Bough
- President: Dick Brown
- Coach: David Mobbs-Smith
- League: Regional 1 South Central
- 2024–25: 10th

Official website
- www.maidenheadrfc.com

Maidenhead Rugby Football Club is an English rugby union team based in Maidenhead in Berkshire, training and playing home matches games at Braywick Park. The club runs four senior teams. The first XV play in the Regional 1 South Central, following their promotion from South West 1 East in 2017. The second XV play in Berks/Bucks & Oxon 1, the third XV play in Berks/Bucks & Oxon 3 South and the fourth XV play in Berks/Bucks & Oxon 3 North. The club also runs a veterans side, a ladies team and the full range of junior sides.

== History ==
Maidenhead RFC was formed in February 1922 as Thames Valley Rugby Club. Their first recorded match was against Berkshire Wanderers, now officially known as Reading RFC. The match was played at Cookham Football Club's ground and ended in defeat. It wasn't until 1923 when Thames Valley first beat the Wanderers with a score of 6-3. They later played some matches at Bray Show Ground, before permanently settling at Kidwell's Park in 1926. In 1965, the name was changed to Maidenhead RFC.

The club began competing in the South West division after the national league system was introduced in 1987. They spent just one season in National League 4 in 1989-90, and throughout that period were regularly fluctuating between South West 1 and South West 2. They have won South West 1 four times, in 2003-04, 2008-09, 2010-11 and most recently 2016-17.

The club's senior teams have always been heavily supported by its youth systems. As of 2024-25 the club has age groups from U6 through to U18 (Boys and Girls), and two senior teams.

== Ground ==
Maidenhead RFC began playing at the Bray Show Ground before moving to Kidwell's Park in 1926. The club is currently based at Braywick Park located on Braywick Road in Maidenhead. The ground is a floodlit 3G Artificial Grass Pitch (AGP) and has an estimated capacity of 1750, which includes 250 covered seats for spectators, and 1500 for standing. In 2026, the local council considered a proposal for a brand new football pitch for Maidenhead United FC, to go alongside the rugby pitch. The council's plans also included improved park facilities and Maidenhead RFC security. However, these plans are part of a wider facility improvement proposal and no work is yet to be completed.

== Honours ==
1st team:

- South West Division 1 East champions (4): 2003–04, 2008–09, 2010–11, 2016–17

3rd team:

- Berks/Bucks & Oxon 1 South champions: 2008–09
