= Bracknell RFC =

English rugby union club, based in Berkshire

Bracknell
- Full name: Bracknell Rugby Football Club
- Union: Berkshire RFU
- Founded: 1955; 71 years ago
- Ground: Lily Hill Park (Capacity: 1,250 (250 Seats))
- Chairman: Stu Evans
- President: Martin Radford
- Director of Rugby: Ben Nowak (Chair of Rugby)
- League: Regional 1 South Central
- 2025–26: 6th
Team kit

Official website
- www.pitchero.com/clubs/bracknell/

Bracknell Rugby Football Club is an English rugby union team based in Bracknell, Berkshire. The club was established in 1955. The club welcomes new members, players, coaches and volunteers.

The club runs five senior sides, a ladies team, under-19 and under-17 academy sides and the full range of minis and junior teams. The senior sides play on Saturday afternoons and train on Tuesday and Thursday evenings. The juniors usually play Sunday afternoons with training on Wednesday evenings and the minis train and play on Sunday morning. The 1st XV currently play in Regional 1 South Central, a level five league in the English rugby union system

== Ground ==
Lily Hill Park is located on the south edge of name-sake Lily Hill Park, off London Road, about 20 minutes walk from Bracknell train station. Bracknell have played in and around Lily Hill Park since 1958, with the first club house situated in Eastern Road. In 1972 the site of the original club house was sold and a new club house was built at the present site at London Road, along with additional pitches and changing facilities. During the 1980s the club house was expanded further, with gym facilities upgraded and improved floodlights installed.

In 2000, after achieving promotion to tier 2, a 250-seat stand was installed, along with a path for spectators besides the pitch. Current capacity at the club is approximately 2,000 standing, along with 250 in the stand, bringing the total figure to around 2,250.

== Honours ==
1st team:

- Berks/Dorset/Wilts 1 champions (2): 1988–89, 1991–92
- South West 1 East champions (2): 1996–97, 2012–13
- South West 1 champions: 1997–98
- National League 2 South champions: 1998–99
- National 2 champions: 2000–01
- Berkshire Knock Out Cup winners (4): 2006–07, 2008–09, 2009–10, 2013–14

2nd team:

- Berks/Bucks & Oxon 1 champions (3): 2014–15, 2015–16, 2017–18

3rd team:

- Berks/Bucks & Oxon 1 champions (3): 2006–07, 2010–11, 2012–13
- Berks/Bucks & Oxon 3 Runners Up : 2016–17
- Berks/Bucks & Oxon 2 Champions: 2017–18
