= Havant RFC =

English rugby union club, based in Havant, Hampshire

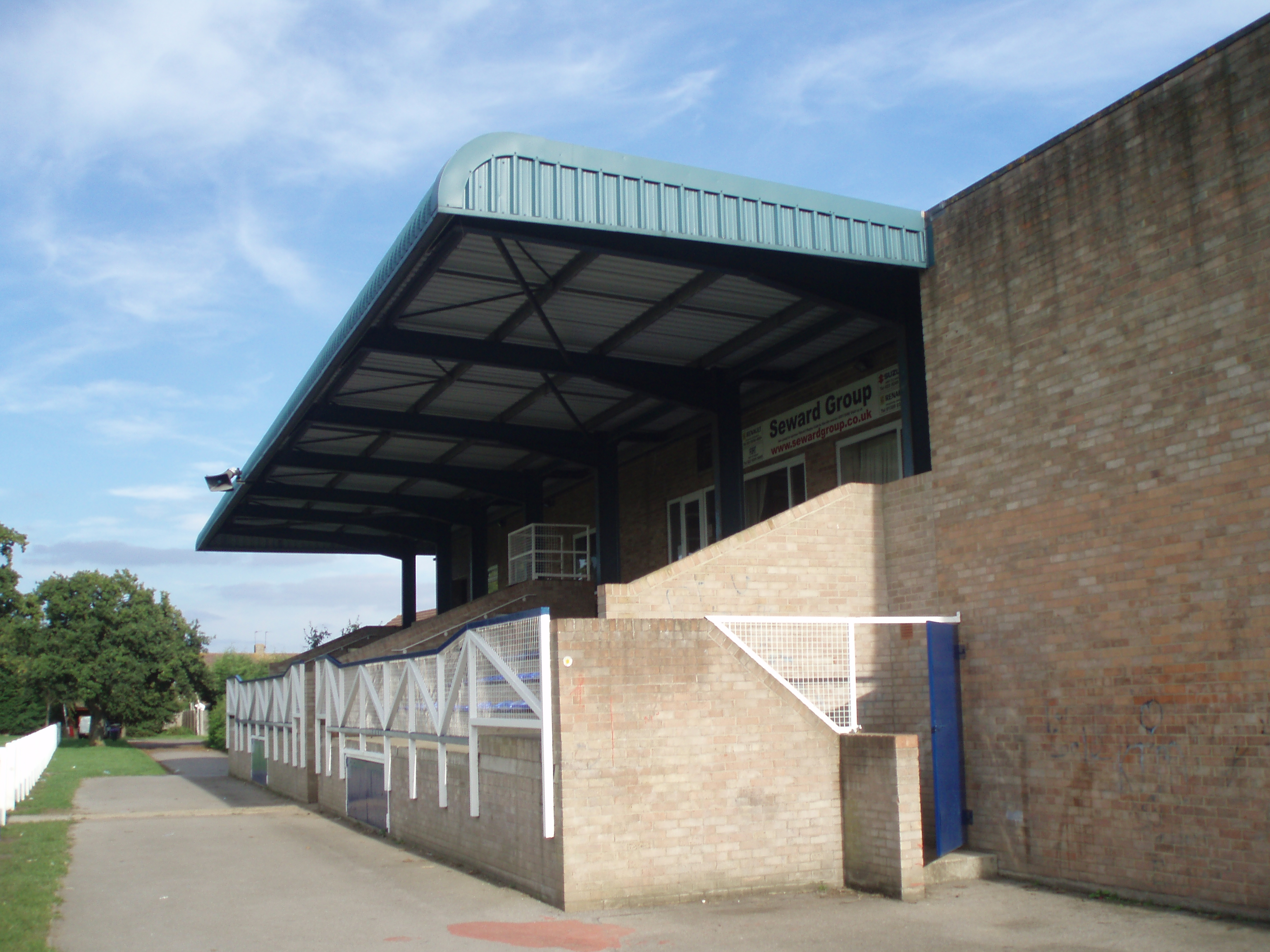
- Mick Chalk Stand, Havant RFC
- Full name: Havant Rugby Football Club
- Union: English RFU
- Nickname: Hav
- Founded: 1951; 75 years ago
- Location: Bedhampton, Havant, Hampshire, England
- Region: Hampshire RFU
- Ground: Hook's Lane (Capacity: 1,500 (500 seated))
- Chairman: Nigel May
- President: Jon Mangnall
- Director of Rugby: Rob Matthews
- Coach(es): Will Knight, Matt Davis
- Captain(s): Joel Knight, Natasha Bullock
- League: National League 2 East
- 2025–26: 8th

Official website
- www.havantrfc.co.uk

Havant RFC is an English rugby union club and is a member of the Hampshire RFU. The men's 1st XV currently play in the RFU's National League 2 East, a tier 4 league, following their promotion from Regional 1 South Central at the end of the 2023–24 season.

Havant currently run four senior men's teams and two senior women’s teams – 1st XV, 2nd XV (Dolphins) – who play in the Solent League, 3rd XV ('A' XV) – who play in Hampshire 2 and a veteran's side (The Mariners). The two senior women’s teams consist of the 1st XV, who are playing in the RFUW's Women's Championship 2 South West League for the 2023-2024 season, and the Sirens who compete in National Challenge 3 South West (South). In addition to the senior men's teams there is an Academy team (under 19s) – who play in Hampshire Colts League Division 1. Additionally Havant Minis and Juniors run sides covering every age from infant school to sixth form.

== History ==
Havant RFC, 'Hav', was founded in April 1951 and came to their present home, at Hook's Lane, Bedhampton, two years later. The clubhouse, which was built by members of the club, was opened in 1955 by the Lady Mayoress of Portsmouth.

Ten years after its founding, HRFC was running five sides. In 1962 the colts were started and there were further extensions to the clubhouse. A new clubhouse was opened at the end of 1975 and in 1993 there were further extensions including the addition of an all-seater grandstand.

Early milestones in the club's playing history were the winning of the Hampshire Cup for the first time in 1974–75 and then, in 1975–76, becoming the first Junior Club to get through to the last 16 of the John Player Cup. HRFC have now won the Hampshire Cup 19 times, most recently in the 2017-18 season and have appeared in the final 28 times in the period from 1970 to 2018.

The highlights of the league campaigns were gaining promotion to National League 3 at the end of 1991–92, and then finishing joint top of that division the following season, missing promotion on points difference after surprisingly losing their last match at Aspatria which, had they succeeded, would have made the club one of the top twenty clubs in the country. After a difficult period in the second half of the 1990s (concurrent with the advent of professionalism), the club halted their slide in 2000–01 and fought their way back into the National Leagues the following season. They were immediately relegated, but bounced straight back at the end of the next season, and in 2004–05 managed a top half of the table finish to establish themselves at this level.

In 2005–06 HRFC consolidated their National League 3 South credentials with a mid-table finish and in 2006–07 they mounted their best campaign in recent years to finish just outside the promotion places in 3rd position. The following seasons have been difficult for 'Hav' with many players leaving the area, retiring or moving to other clubs – ultimately leading to relegations after the 2008–09 season and the 2011–12 season to get to their current level.

== Ground ==
Havant have been based at Hook's Lane since 1953. Ground capacity in the early 1990s was estimated to be around 3,000, including 200 seated, which was re-estimated to 2,000 (200 seats) in 1994. Over the years this has been further reduced to around 1,500, but there is increased seating capacity for up to 500 spectators.

== League record ==
HRFC League Record
Season	Division	Tier	Position	Outcome
1987–88	Area League South	4	5/11	
1988–89	Area League South	4	2/11	
1989–90	Area League South	4	5/11	
1990–91	National Division 4 South	4	8/13	
1991–92	National Division 4 South	4	1/13	promoted
1992–93	National Division 3	3	2/12	
1993-94	National Division 3	3	9/10	relegated
1994-95	National Division 4	4	4/10	
1995-96	National Division 4	4	8/10	
1996-97	National Division 3	4	14/16	
1997-98	National Division 2 South	4	12/14	
1998-99	National Division 2 South	4	14/14	relegated
1999-00	London League 1	5	8/17	
2000-01	London League 1	5	2/12	
2001-02	London League 1	5	1/12	promoted
2002-03	National League 3 South	4	13/14	relegated
2003-04	London League 1	5	1/12	promoted
2004-05	National League 3 South	4	7/14	
2005-06	National League 3 South	4	9/14	
2006-07	National League 3 South	4	3/14	
2007-08	National League 3 South	4	10/14	
2008-09	National League 3 South	4	14/14	relegated
2009-10	National League 3 London & South-east	5	8/14	
2010-11	National League 3 London & South-east	5	11/14	
2011-12	National League 3 London & South-east	5	14/14	relegated
2012-13	London 1 South	6	9/14	
2013-14	London 1 South	6	9/14	
2014-15	London 1 South	6	7/14	
2015-16	London 1 South	6	9/14	
2016-17	London 1 South	6	3/14	
2017-18	London 1 South	6	3/14	
2018-19	London 1 South	6	6/14	
2019–20	London 1 South	6	1/14	promoted
2020–21	London & South East Premier	5	cancelled due to Covid-19	
2019–20	London & South East Premier	5	5/14	

== Honours ==
1st team:

- Hampshire Cup winners (19): 1975, 1978, 1979, 1980, 1984, 1985, 1986, 1987, 1988, 1989, 1991, 1996, 2005, 2006, 2007, 2008, 2015, 2017, 2018
- Courage National Division 4 South champions: 1991–92
- London Division 1 champions (2): 2001–02, 2003–04
- London 1 South champions: 2019–20
- Regional 1 South Central champions: 2023–24

3rd team:

- Hampshire 2 champions: 2018–19

== Notable club members ==
- Mick Chalk, awarded the British Empire Medal in the Queen's Birthday Honours List for 2012, shortly before his death
- Ngapaku Ngapaku ('Pux'), Fly-half who had earlier represented Samoa, played a number of seasons at Havant in the 2000s
- Jim Syddall, Lock latterly capped for England, who played at Havant 1975-76
- Mike Wedderburn, Sky Sports presenter and former Harlequins and London Wasps Winger, played his early rugby in the late 1980s at Havant
- Derek White, former Scotland and British and Irish Lions No. 8, played a handful of games for Havant in the 1990s

== The club badge ==
Havant RFC club badge

The figure in the top half of the shield is that used in heraldry to represent a Dolphin. The significance to the club of the Dolphin is that the club was founded at a meeting in The Dolphin Hotel in Havant on 27 April 1951. At that time The Dolphin was in West Street in Havant where it had been since the early part of the 19th Century; stagecoaches used it as the principal inn in Havant on the road between Brighton and Portsmouth. In 1958 it was demolished to make way for the West Street Arcade - itself demolished when the Meridian Centre (since renamed Meridian Shopping) was built – and was re-sited in Park Road South. This has since been demolished to make way for a special needs home.

The bottom left of the shield contains the figures to be seen on the Hampshire badge, a crown over a rose. These figures are also used in the badge of the Hampshire RFU. This is a badge of great antiquity and was accepted in its present form by Hampshire County Council in 1895. In some forms of the badge there is a double rose – white in the centre and red on the outer edges – but the more ancient form, and the one shown on today’s badge is a Lancastrian red rose.

The bottom right contains a figure to represent a sheet of parchment representing the ancient craft of parchment making that was practised in Havant for hundreds of years and which finally ceased in 1936. There were a couple of firms still making parchment in Havant at the turn of the 20th century, Stallards working in Homewell and Stents in West Street. Stallards finally closed in 1936 and the buildings were occupied by the building firm, Carrells. Stents became glove makers before closing down in the 1950s, their premises being taken over by the building firm, Henry Jones.

== Current standings ==
2025–26 National League 2 East table
Pos	Team	Pld	W	D	L	PF	PA	PD	TB	LB	Pts	Qualification
1	Bury St Edmunds (C)	26	20	1	5	1128	659	+469	22	4	108	Promotion place
2	Oundle	26	20	2	4	940	713	+227	21	1	106	Promotion Play-off
3	Old Albanian	26	18	0	8	1009	813	+196	22	3	97	
4	Barnes	26	16	1	9	738	598	+140	15	5	86	
5	Canterbury	26	16	0	10	851	644	+207	16	6	86	
6	Dorking	26	14	2	10	798	598	+200	13	6	79	
7	Westcombe Park	26	12	0	14	851	751	+100	19	8	75	
8	Havant	26	11	1	14	840	960	−120	19	1	66	
9	London Welsh	26	10	0	16	705	866	−161	16	8	64	
10	Guernsey Raiders	26	11	1	14	690	875	−185	13	3	62	
11	Esher	26	10	0	16	844	831	+13	16	6	62	
12	Henley Hawks	26	9	2	15	693	665	+28	12	9	61	Relegation Play-off
13	Sevenoaks (R)	26	8	0	18	743	900	−157	12	5	49	Relegation place
14	Oxford Harlequins (R)	26	2	0	24	505	1462	−957	11	2	21	Relegation place

Updated to match(es) played on 2 May 2026. Source: National League Rugby
Rules for classification: If teams are level at any stage, tiebreakers are applied in the following order:
1. Number of matches won
2. Number of matches drawn
3. Difference between points for and against
4. Total number of points for
5. Aggregate number of points scored in matches between tied teams
6. Number of matches won excluding the first match, then the second and so on until the tie is settled
