= Dorking R.F.C. =

English rugby union football club

Dorking
- Full name: Dorking Rugby Football Club
- Union: Surrey RFU
- Founded: 1921; 105 years ago
- Location: Brockham, Surrey, England
- Ground: The Big Field (Capacity: (1,500) all standing)
- Chairman: Shaun Hammond
- President: Paul Mosley
- Director of Rugby: Armand Roux
- Captain: William Scholes
- League: National League 2 East
- 2025–26: 6th
Team kit

Official website
- www.dorkingrfc.com

Dorking Rugby Football Club is an English rugby union football club, originally based in Dorking, Surrey and play in the nearby village of Brockham. The club currently play in the fourth tier (National League 2 East) of English club rugby.

== About ==
With over 700 active registered players, the club runs four senior sides and has produced internationals such as Elliot Daly, George Kruis, and Kay Wilson; a ladies team, and a large youth section aged between 5 and 18.

The club holds a fierce local derby with Old Reigatian RFC

== History ==
Dorking RFC was founded in 1921 with a single team; a second team followed in 1928. The club ceased to play in 1940 due to the demands of World War II. It was re-established in 1946, initially with a single team, but grew rapidly as 2nd (1947), 3rd (1948) and 4th (1954) teams were formed.

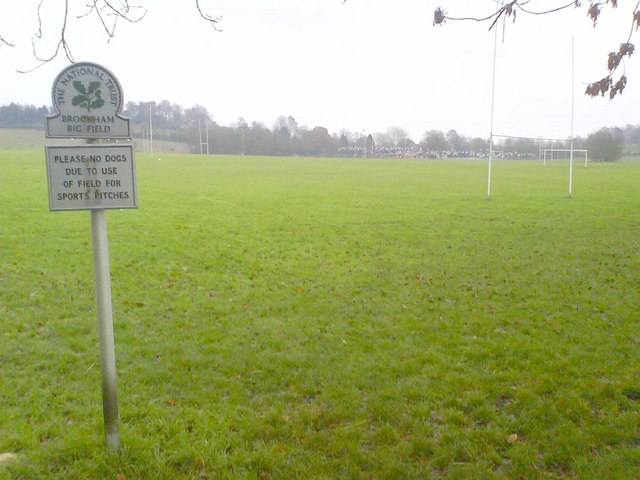
Brockham Big Field (NT), pictured in 2006

The club moved to The Big Field in Brockham in 1972 when it was granted a 50-year lease by the National Trust. This was extended with another 50-year lease in 2011.

The first youth team – Dorking Schoolboys XV – was formed in 1951 with a single team of 13 to 18-year-olds. By 1965 this had grown to the point of splitting into three age banded teams. A mini section (for girls and boys aged 6–12) followed in 1980 and the first ladies team in 1988. Dorking youth teams have twice triumphed in the National under-17 cup, winning the main competition in 2007 and the Shield in 2012.

The 1st XV was promoted to the RFU National Leagues (National League 3 London & SE) in 2009 and at the end of the 2013–14 season won promotion to National League 2 South, finishing fourth in 2014–15, their highest league position to date. However the 2015–16 season saw the club lose many players such as hooker Ross Grimstone to Richmond F.C. & scrum half Will Crow to Rosslyn Park F.C. who represented the England Counties side in a game against Romania in the summer prior to the end of 2014–15. The club spent a number of years at level 5, before winning promotion back to National 2 in 2022. In recent years, the club has seen a number of new faces join the senior section with the AXV following the 1st XV in a promotion into the Raging Bull Shield. The Women's XV currently compete at Level 6 of the League system in NC3.

== Current standings ==
2025–26 National League 2 East table
Pos	Team	Pld	W	D	L	PF	PA	PD	TB	LB	Pts	Qualification
1	Bury St Edmunds (C)	26	20	1	5	1128	659	+469	22	4	108	Promotion place
2	Oundle	26	20	2	4	940	713	+227	21	1	106	Promotion Play-off
3	Old Albanian	26	18	0	8	1009	813	+196	22	3	97	
4	Barnes	26	16	1	9	738	598	+140	15	5	86	
5	Canterbury	26	16	0	10	851	644	+207	16	6	86	
6	Dorking	26	14	2	10	798	598	+200	13	6	79	
7	Westcombe Park	26	12	0	14	851	751	+100	19	8	75	
8	Havant	26	11	1	14	840	960	−120	19	1	66	
9	London Welsh	26	10	0	16	705	866	−161	16	8	64	
10	Guernsey Raiders	26	11	1	14	690	875	−185	13	3	62	
11	Esher	26	10	0	16	844	831	+13	16	6	62	
12	Henley Hawks	26	9	2	15	693	665	+28	12	9	61	Relegation Play-off
13	Sevenoaks (R)	26	8	0	18	743	900	−157	12	5	49	Relegation place
14	Oxford Harlequins (R)	26	2	0	24	505	1462	−957	11	2	21	Relegation place

Updated to match(es) played on 2 May 2026. Source: National League Rugby
Rules for classification: If teams are level at any stage, tiebreakers are applied in the following order:
1. Number of matches won
2. Number of matches drawn
3. Difference between points for and against
4. Total number of points for
5. Aggregate number of points scored in matches between tied teams
6. Number of matches won excluding the first match, then the second and so on until the tie is settled

== John Douglas Youth Development Fund ==
The official launch of the John Douglas Youth Development Fund took place on Wednesday 15 March 2017. The launch event was attended by Douglas's family and representatives from the Surrey RFU. According to the club, the fund's primary objective is to "fund or part fund specific projects or initiatives in the support of obtaining the highest possible standard and engagement of rugby through Dorking Rugby Club with particular emphasis on Youth Development".

== Honours ==
- Surrey 1 champions: 1988–89
- London 3 South West champions: 1989–90
- London 2 South champions: 1990–91
- London Division 4 South West champions: 2005–06
- London 2 (south-east v south-west) promotion play-off winner: 2006–07
- Powergen Junior Vase: 2006
- London 1 (north v south) promotion play-off winner: 2008–09
- Surrey Cup winners (3): 2010, 2014, 2017
- National League 3 London & SE champions: 2013–14, 2021–22
