= Westcombe Park RFC =

English rugby union club, based in Orpington, London

(England) Westcombe Park
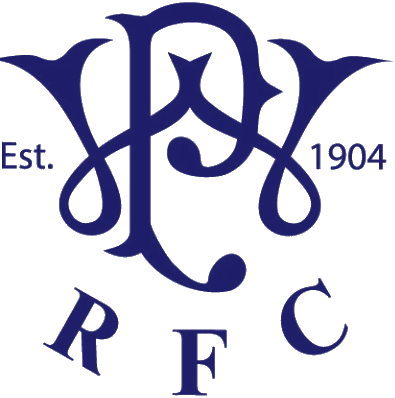
- Full name: Westcombe Park Rugby Football Club
- Union: Kent RFU
- Nickname: Combe
- Founded: 1904; 122 years ago
- Location: Orpington, Bromley, London, England
- Ground: Goddington Dene (Capacity: 3,200 (200 seats, 3,000 standing))
- Chairman: John Vallely
- President: John Aitkenhead
- Coach(es): David Marshall, Darren Molloy & Andy Pratt
- League: National League 2 East
- 2025–26: 7th
Team kit

Official website
- www.westcombeparkrugby.co.uk

Westcombe Park RFC is a rugby football club based in Orpington in south-east London. The name of the club comes from the Westcombe Park area of what is today part of the Royal Borough of Greenwich, where the club was founded. The club played on fields in Lee, Shooter's Hill and Sidcup before the move to Orpington. Westcombe Park play in National League 2 East, a level four league in the English rugby union system following their promotion from Regional 1 South East at the end of the 2022–23 season.

== History ==
The club – also known as 'Combe' – was founded by rugby fanatic Dudley E Roughton, a disabled man unable to play the game himself, making the club unique in that its founder was not an original player. In the summer of 1904 he decided to form his own team. Founding members included siblings, friends and extended family. The Church aided the formation of the club in the shape of the Rev W T Money, who played until the age of 52. Several pictures from this time are on display on the club website. The club's early results were encouraging and sometimes two or more sides turned out. Before the Great War the club shifted its headquarters several times and eventually lighted upon Harrow Field Farm, Lee.

With the outbreak of World War I in 1914, club rugby was put on hold for four years. The war took its toll on the team with 23 of the club's 84 members being killed on duty. Amongst them was Cecil Harold Sewell – posthumously awarded the Victoria Cross in 1918. The club reconvened in 1919 and resumed playing at Sidcup RFC's ground. By 1925–6 Combe was running six sides and was fully involved in the Kent Cup.

In 1930, the club started to look for its own ground. The club had by then transferred to Shooters Hill and was using converted stables as a club-house, complete with baths and electricity. When the Shooters Hill ground was acquired for housing, the search for a permanent home became even more pressing. A club member negotiated with Orpington Council for the lease of two pitches (later increased to four) and a plot of adjoining land was purchased to enable the erection of a pavilion. At this time the pavilion was one of a handful of properties in what became Craven Road.

Club rugby was further interrupted by World War II, after which the club reformed and two teams ran out during the 1945–46 season (Combe was also able to repay Sidcup for their hospitality earlier). Players more local to Orpington now joined the club. Membership and the number of playing sides increased.

By the mid-1960s the original club house had been replaced with a wooden structure, housing baths, changing rooms with re-mountable partitions, and warm-air heating. The club remained in the Craven Road site until 1990.

== Today ==
Combe aims to operate as a community club for players of different age groups, from minis and juniors to the 1st XV, including social and veterans teams. Most youth rugby occurs on Sundays (occasional National Cup Academy matches take place on Saturdays). The club fields at least one team per age group between the ages of 7 and 19 with a strong reputation amongst other clubs, including London Irish, Colchester RFC and Blackheath. The club boasts international representatives at several levels.

The 1st XV play its rugby in National 2 East from 2023–24, having been promoted back into the National League having won Regional 1 South East in 2022–-23. With up to four senior teams playing at weekends including the 1st team and a 2nd XV commonly known as the Extra 1st XV, who play in the RFU league at Level 8 (Counties 2 Kent).

Relocation to the present site at Goddington Dene, Orpington took place in 1990 when the club became the major section within the Orpington Sports Club. In 1994, Westcombe Park took over the running and responsibility for the sports club and offered playing facilities, issuing contractual terms, to other sports (cricket, football, tennis and table tennis) as Associated Clubs under the control of Westcombe Park and Orpington Sports Club. In 1995, the club became a limited company, registered under the Industrial and Provident Societies Act 1965. The club now has four rugby pitches, a grandstand, a fully equipped gymnasium, two football pitches, two cricket squares and three tennis courts.

== Honours ==
- London 3 South East champions: 1989–90
- London Division 1 champions: 1998–99
- National Division Three (north v south) promotion play-off winners: 2006–07
- Regional 1 South East champions 2022–23
- Kent Cup winners (8): 1993, 1995, 1998, 1999, 2000, 2002, 2004, 2016
- Kent Plate winners (2): 2014, 2018
- Kent Vets Plate winners (1): 2017
- Kent Vets Cup winners (4): 2019, 2020, 2022, 2024

== Current standings ==
2025–26 National League 2 East table
| Pos | Team | Pld | W | D | L | PF | PA | PD | TB | LB | Pts | Qualification |
|---|---|---|---|---|---|---|---|---|---|---|---|---|
| 1 | Bury St Edmunds (C) | 26 | 20 | 1 | 5 | 1128 | 659 | +469 | 22 | 4 | 108 | Promotion place |
| 2 | Oundle | 26 | 20 | 2 | 4 | 940 | 713 | +227 | 21 | 1 | 106 | Promotion Play-off |
| 3 | Old Albanian | 26 | 18 | 0 | 8 | 1009 | 813 | +196 | 22 | 3 | 97 | |
| 4 | Barnes | 26 | 16 | 1 | 9 | 738 | 598 | +140 | 15 | 5 | 86 | |
| 5 | Canterbury | 26 | 16 | 0 | 10 | 851 | 644 | +207 | 16 | 6 | 86 | |
| 6 | Dorking | 26 | 14 | 2 | 10 | 798 | 598 | +200 | 13 | 6 | 79 | |
| 7 | Westcombe Park | 26 | 12 | 0 | 14 | 851 | 751 | +100 | 19 | 8 | 75 | |
| 8 | Havant | 26 | 11 | 1 | 14 | 840 | 960 | −120 | 19 | 1 | 66 | |
| 9 | London Welsh | 26 | 10 | 0 | 16 | 705 | 866 | −161 | 16 | 8 | 64 | |
| 10 | Guernsey Raiders | 26 | 11 | 1 | 14 | 690 | 875 | −185 | 13 | 3 | 62 | |
| 11 | Esher | 26 | 10 | 0 | 16 | 844 | 831 | +13 | 16 | 6 | 62 | |
| 12 | Henley Hawks | 26 | 9 | 2 | 15 | 693 | 665 | +28 | 12 | 9 | 61 | Relegation Play-off |
| 13 | Sevenoaks (R) | 26 | 8 | 0 | 18 | 743 | 900 | −157 | 12 | 5 | 49 | Relegation place |
| 14 | Oxford Harlequins (R) | 26 | 2 | 0 | 24 | 505 | 1462 | −957 | 11 | 2 | 21 | Relegation place |

Updated to match(es) played on 2 May 2026. Source: National League Rugby
Rules for classification: If teams are level at any stage, tiebreakers are applied in the following order:
1. Number of matches won
2. Number of matches drawn
3. Difference between points for and against
4. Total number of points for
5. Aggregate number of points scored in matches between tied teams
6. Number of matches won excluding the first match, then the second and so on until the tie is settled
