= Canterbury RFC =

English rugby union club, based in Kent

(England) Canterbury RFC
- Full name: Canterbury Rugby Football Club
- Union: Kent RFU
- Nickname: CRFC
- Founded: 1929; 97 years ago
- Location: Canterbury, Kent, England
- Ground(s): The Marine Travel Ground, Merton Lane North (Capacity: 1,500 (75 seats))
- Chairman: John Halliday
- President: Pat Goode
- Coach(es): Matt Corker, Alex Veale, Danny Herriott
- Captain: Jamie Stephens
- Top scorer: Frank Reynolds
- League: National League 2 East
- 2025–26: 5th
Team kit

Official website
- cantrugby.co.uk

Canterbury RFC is an English rugby union football club based in Canterbury, Kent. The club currently play in the fourth tier of English club rugby, participating in National League 2 East following their relegation from National League 1 at the end of the 2019–20 season. The club runs five senior sides, Canterbury Hellfire wheelchair rugby team, a ladies team, and a full range of mini and junior teams including girls

== History ==
=== Brief history of Canterbury RFC ===
Founded in 1929 Canterbury is the first East Kent club to achieve National League status. That milestone was reached when they became champions of London and South East Division One in 2005–06. In the most rewarding season in the club's history they also won the Kent Cup for a second successive year and gained further recognition when named rugby's Team of the Year by Rugby World magazine.

=== Founding fathers ===
Times have certainly changed from when the founding fathers, many of them involved with agriculture, first took their post-match pints and pies in a local pub and played on a hired pitch. Modern players might even envy them in that the season rarely started in earnest before October when all the fruit picking in the area was over and farmer/rugby players could start thinking about a free Saturday afternoon.

=== Dudley Hallwood ===
However, the club's first skipper was no son of the soil. Dudley Hallwood went on to become a successful businessman and newspaper cartoonist and the club's principal Sevens trophy still bears his name. Apart from the interruption of the Second World War, Canterbury built steadily over the years and boasted one of the strongest fixture lists in the county. They produced a number of fine players who represented Kent but the only tangible reward came in the 1974–75 season when the club beat old rivals Maidstone to win the County Cup.

=== Leagues ===
Some indeterminate years followed but the advent of leagues in the late 1980s was, like the experience of so many other clubs, a culture shock. After first being placed in London 3 South East, Canterbury went steadily downhill. They fell as low as Kent Division 2 at the start of the 1990s but from that unpromising position a revival was born, which included the expansion of the junior and colts section.

=== New millennium ===
Throughout the next decade they climbed steadily up the league ladder and made it their ambition to be a London Division One club by the millennium. Having won the London 2 South championship in 2000 they were told there was no promotion because of re-organization of the leagues, but they won a place in the top London division two years later.

=== Kent Cup ===
After the initial success in the county competition in 1975 the club had to wait another thirty years before winning the cup again. When they did get their hands on the trophy in 2005 the victory over Westcombe Park inspired a dominant four-year run. In the following three seasons they met the same opponents, Blackheath, in the final and each time Canterbury were the victors. In 2008–09 the county committee decreed that Kent's National League clubs must enter their second teams in the competition and the club's grip on the cup was loosened. It was four years before the trophy returned to Canterbury when they defeated Westcombe Park in 2012.

=== National leagues ===
After an outstanding promotion season Canterbury made a tentative start to their first venture into National League rugby but then exceeded all expectations by ending 2006–07 in fourth position in National 3 South. The demands of the higher league, which subsequently became National 2 South, increased every season but Canterbury responded to the challenge and were consistently in the top half of the table, despite the presence of many clubs with heavy financial backing. The 2010–11 season, however, proved to be a bridge too far and the team was relegated on the final day of the season. They responded in positive fashion to win back their place in National 2 South at the first attempt and since have re-established themselves.

The 2018–19 season saw the club's best performance in National 2 South to date, finishing in second place and earning a home play-off against their counterparts in National 2 North, Chester RUFC. The race for the play-off spot was a thrilling one with Henley Hawks and local rivals Tonbridge Juddians pushing hard until an away victory over Barnes RFC guaranteed the opportunity. In front of a record attendance of 2000 spectators, the club won a tight match 19–10.

=== Community commitment ===
The club's commitment to its community responsibilities continues to grow. One of the major achievements has been the successful establishment of a Wheelchair Rugby section. In the space if just eighteen months its members achieved a place in the national competitions. The club was rewarded in the 2015 RFU Presidents Awards when named as winner of the Community Engagement category, following success the previous year when Canterbury won the Best Managed Club accolade.

== Current standings ==
2025–26 National League 2 East table
Pos	Team	Pld	W	D	L	PF	PA	PD	TB	LB	Pts	Qualification
1	Bury St Edmunds (C)	26	20	1	5	1128	659	+469	22	4	108	Promotion place
2	Oundle	26	20	2	4	940	713	+227	21	1	106	Promotion Play-off
3	Old Albanian	26	18	0	8	1009	813	+196	22	3	97	
4	Barnes	26	16	1	9	738	598	+140	15	5	86	
5	Canterbury	26	16	0	10	851	644	+207	16	6	86	
6	Dorking	26	14	2	10	798	598	+200	13	6	79	
7	Westcombe Park	26	12	0	14	851	751	+100	19	8	75	
8	Havant	26	11	1	14	840	960	−120	19	1	66	
9	London Welsh	26	10	0	16	705	866	−161	16	8	64	
10	Guernsey Raiders	26	11	1	14	690	875	−185	13	3	62	
11	Esher	26	10	0	16	844	831	+13	16	6	62	
12	Henley Hawks	26	9	2	15	693	665	+28	12	9	61	Relegation Play-off
13	Sevenoaks (R)	26	8	0	18	743	900	−157	12	5	49	Relegation place
14	Oxford Harlequins (R)	26	2	0	24	505	1462	−957	11	2	21	Relegation place

Updated to match(es) played on 2 May 2026. Source: National League Rugby
Rules for classification: If teams are level at any stage, tiebreakers are applied in the following order:
1. Number of matches won
2. Number of matches drawn
3. Difference between points for and against
4. Total number of points for
5. Aggregate number of points scored in matches between tied teams
6. Number of matches won excluding the first match, then the second and so on until the tie is settled

== Ground ==
Canterbury RFC play at The Marine Travel Ground, named after a sponsorship deal starting in 2008, is situated on Merton Lane on the southern outskirts of Canterbury. It is about 2.5 miles from Canterbury East railway station and 3.3 miles from Canterbury West railway station but is most easily reached by car as it is located next to the A2, and there is on-site parking. The Marine Travel Ground consists of a main pitch next to a small stand and the club-house, with four additional pitches for reserve and junior fixtures. The main pitch ground capacity includes 75 seats in the stand, along with around 1,000 standing pitchside, bringing total capacity to approximately 1,075.

== Honours ==
- Kent Cup winners (6): 1975, 2005, 2006, 2007, 2008, 2012
- Kent 2 champions: 1991–92
- Kent 1 champions: 1992–93
- London 3 South East champions: 1997–98
- Kent Plate winners: 2002, 2019
- London 2 South (level 6) champions (2): 1999–00, 2001–02
- National League 3 London & SE (level 5, formerly London Division 1) champions (2): 2005–06, 2011–12
- National League 2 (level 4) runner-up and promotion play-off winner: 2018–19
