= London Welsh Amateur =

English rugby union club, based in London

(England) London Welsh Amateur
- Full name: London Welsh Amateur Rugby Football Club
- Union: Middlesex RFU, Wales RU
- Nickname(s): Exiles, Dragons, Druids
- Founded: 1990s
- Location: Richmond, London, England
- Ground: Old Deer Park (Capacity: 5,850 (1,000 seats))
- Chairman: Danny Griffiths
- Coach(es): Sonny Parker, Cai Griffiths, James Collins-Clarke
- Captain: Courtney Maggs-Jones
- League: National League 2 East
- 2025–26: 9th
1st kit	2nd kit

Official website
- www.londonwelshrfc.com

London Welsh Amateur Rugby Football Club, previously known as London Welsh Druids and as of 2017 London Welsh, is an English amateur rugby union club based at Old Deer Park in Richmond, London. They were the amateur team of London Welsh until the professional team's liquidation in 2017. The amateur team continued independently as they were considered a separate club by the Rugby Football Union.

They are currently playing in National League 2 East – a tier 4 league in the English rugby union system – following promotion from Regional 1 South Central at the end of the 2024–25 season.

== History ==
London Welsh Amateur were founded in the 1990s after London Welsh reached the top of National League 1 and decided to split the club to separate the professional wing from the community club. In 2004, London Welsh Amateur were incorporated as a limited company. In 2017, London Welsh were expelled from the RFU Championship and later liquidated due to debt. When London Welsh were given extra time for a phoenix company to take over the club and fulfill RFU regulations, one of the conditions was that they had to show a clear separation between London Welsh and London Welsh Amateur but were unable to meet the requirements. Despite this decision, it did not affect London Welsh Amateur as they were held as having a separate membership of the RFU and separate voting rights.

As a result, London Welsh Amateur became the primary representatives of the London Welsh club. They also stated that they would remain amateur despite inheriting the liquidated professional club's infrastructure. For their first season since London Welsh's liquidation, London Welsh Amateur appointed former Welsh international Sonny Parker as director of rugby. Following the professional side's liquidation, London Welsh Amateur adopted the London Welsh name.

At the end of the 2017–18 season they finished as champions of Herts/Middlesex 1 and gained promotion to London 3 North West.

After the 2019–20 season was abandoned due to the coronavirus outbreak, London Welsh finished as Champions of London 2 North West and were promoted to London 1 South for 2020–21 season, which was not played due to the ongoing COVID-19 pandemic. Following the 31–17 victory away at Wimbledon, London Welsh confirm their 5th promotion in seven seasons, completing 'Project Reset' and will return to the National Leagues for the first time in 2025–26 following the original club's liquidation in 2017.

== Current standings ==
2025–26 National League 2 East table
Pos	Team	Pld	W	D	L	PF	PA	PD	TB	LB	Pts	Qualification
1	Bury St Edmunds (C)	26	20	1	5	1128	659	+469	22	4	108	Promotion place
2	Oundle	26	20	2	4	940	713	+227	21	1	106	Promotion Play-off
3	Old Albanian	26	18	0	8	1009	813	+196	22	3	97	
4	Barnes	26	16	1	9	738	598	+140	15	5	86	
5	Canterbury	26	16	0	10	851	644	+207	16	6	86	
6	Dorking	26	14	2	10	798	598	+200	13	6	79	
7	Westcombe Park	26	12	0	14	851	751	+100	19	8	75	
8	Havant	26	11	1	14	840	960	−120	19	1	66	
9	London Welsh	26	10	0	16	705	866	−161	16	8	64	
10	Guernsey Raiders	26	11	1	14	690	875	−185	13	3	62	
11	Esher	26	10	0	16	844	831	+13	16	6	62	
12	Henley Hawks	26	9	2	15	693	665	+28	12	9	61	Relegation Play-off
13	Sevenoaks (R)	26	8	0	18	743	900	−157	12	5	49	Relegation place
14	Oxford Harlequins (R)	26	2	0	24	505	1462	−957	11	2	21	Relegation place

Updated to match(es) played on 2 May 2026. Source: National League Rugby
Rules for classification: If teams are level at any stage, tiebreakers are applied in the following order:
1. Number of matches won
2. Number of matches drawn
3. Difference between points for and against
4. Total number of points for
5. Aggregate number of points scored in matches between tied teams
6. Number of matches won excluding the first match, then the second and so on until the tie is settled

== Honours ==
- Herts/Middlesex 1 champions: 2017–18
- London 3 North West champions: 2018–19
- London 2 North West champions: 2019–20
- London 1 South runners-up (promoted): 2021–22
- Regional 1 South Central champions: 2024–25

== See also ==
- London Scottish
- London Irish
- Rugby union in London
