= Guernsey RFC =

Rugby union club in the Channel Islands

Guernsey
- Full name: Guernsey Rugby Football Club
- Union: Hampshire RFU
- Nickname: Raiders
- Founded: 1928; 98 years ago
- Location: Saint Peter Port, Guernsey, Channel Islands
- Ground: Footes Lane (Capacity: 5,000 (720 seated))
- Chairman: Gary Haycock-West
- President: Ady Le Page
- Coach: Jordan Reynolds
- Captain: Dom Rice
- League: National League 2 East
- 2025–26: 10h
Team kit

Official website
- www.pitchero.com/clubs/guernseyrfc/

Guernsey Rugby Football Club is an amateur rugby union team who play at Footes Lane in St Peter Port on the Channel Island of Guernsey. The club was formed in 1928. The club runs two senior teams, a veterans side and a colts side.

Their first XV, the Guernsey Raiders currently play in level 4 (National League 2 East) following their promotion from London & South East Premier at the end of the 2019–20 season.

The Guernsey Raiders Ladies team plays in level 4, Women's National Challenge 1 South East (South).

== History ==
Guernsey RFC were founded in 1928 and started playing in English leagues in 1987. As a result of the high transport costs, the Rugby Football Union (RFU) funds the opposition team's travel when they play away at Guernsey as well as funding Guernsey's travel to England for league matches. Until 2010, the Hampshire Rugby Football Union also granted additional funding to help with the transport costs.

In 2011, Guernsey had a new clubhouse constructed which was visited by The Princess Royal during her visit to Guernsey in November. In 2012, after being promoted from London 1 South, Guernsey became the only fully amateur team in National League 3 London & SE. Guernsey host annual "ladies days" during their season.

=== Siam Cup ===
Guernsey annually play Jersey Reds in the inter-insular Siam Cup, the second oldest rugby honour contested after the Calcutta Cup. The host venue alternates yearly between Footes Lane and Jersey's St. Peter. The Siam Cup match is viewed as a season finale by the two clubs as the match is played after the regular league season has finished. In 2010, a Guernsey player was found guilty of assaulting two Jersey players after a Siam Cup game. Since Jersey began employing professional players they have dominated the inter island game. From 2016 in an attempt to even up the game only professional players who had been in Jersey for three years will be eligible for the annual match.

=== Guernsey Ladies Rugby team ===
In 2012, Guernsey's women's team applied to join the English leagues. However the Rugby Football Union rejected their application on logistical grounds and also because the RFU Council had previously passed a moratorium to not admit to the English leagues, any further teams from offshore.

In 2014–15 the decision was overcome and Guernsey Ladies (GLR) joined the Women's National Challenge South East South 2 league, which they won, earning promotion to Women's National Challenge South East South 1 for the 2015–16 season. In 2016-17 the Women again won the top position in their league becoming champions after winning 12 of the 14 season's matches.

=== Men's seasons ===
- 2023-24 National League 2 East - level 4
- 2022-23 National League 2 East - level 4 - 9th
- 2021–22 National League 2 South - level 4 - 10th
- 2020–21 National League 2 South - level 4 - season cancelled
- 2019–20 London & South East Premier - level 5 - 2nd promoted without play-offs
- 2018–19 National League 2 South - level 4 - 15th relegated
- 2017–18 London & South East Premier – level 5 - runners up promoted via play-offs
- 2016–17 National League 3 London & SE - level 5 - 5th
- 2015–16 National League 3 London & SE – level 5 - 6th
- 2014–15 National League 3 London & SE – level 5 - 10th
- 2013–14 National League 3 London & SE – level 5 - 5th
- 2012–13 National League 3 London & SE – level 5 - 8th
- 2011–12 London 1 South – level 6 - 1st promoted
- 2010–11 London 2 South West – level 7 - 1st promoted
- 2009–10 London 2 South West – level 7 - 2nd‡
- 2008–09 London 3 South West – level 7 - 7th‡
- 2007–08 London 3 South West – level 7 - 4th
- 2006–07 London 3 South West – level 7 - 5th
- 2005–06 London 3 South West – level 7 - 10th
- 2004–05 London 3 South West – level 7 - 2nd
- 2003–04 Hampshire 1 – level 8 - 1st promoted
- 2002–03 Hampshire 1 – level 8 - 3rd
- 2001–02 Hampshire 1 – level 8 - 3rd
- 2000–01 Hampshire 1 – level 8 - 5th
- 1999–00 Hampshire 1 – level 8 - 8th
- 1998–99 Hampshire 1 – level 8 - 8th

‡ Leagues re-branded, with London 3 South West renamed London 2 South West

Men's current season results

=== Women's seasons ===
- 2023-24 Women's National Challenge 1 South East (South)
- 2022-23 Women's National Challenge 1 South East (East) - 6th
- 2021-22 Women's National Challenge 1 South East (East) - 6th
- 2020–21 Women's National Challenge 1 South East South 1 - level 4 -
- 2019–20 Women's National Challenge 1 South East South 1 - level 4 - 5th
- 2018–19 Women's National Challenge South East West 1 - level 4 - 3rd
- 2017–18 Women's Championship South West 2 - level 3 - 8th relegated
- 2016–17 Women's National Challenge South East South 1 – level 4 - 1st promoted
- 2015–16 Women's National Challenge South East South 1 – level 4 - 4th
- 2014–15 Women's N C South East South 2 – level 5 - 1st promoted

Ladies current seasons results

== Men's current standings ==
2025–26 National League 2 East table
Pos	Team	Pld	W	D	L	PF	PA	PD	TB	LB	Pts	Qualification
1	Bury St Edmunds (C)	26	20	1	5	1128	659	+469	22	4	108	Promotion place
2	Oundle	26	20	2	4	940	713	+227	21	1	106	Promotion Play-off
3	Old Albanian	26	18	0	8	1009	813	+196	22	3	97	
4	Barnes	26	16	1	9	738	598	+140	15	5	86	
5	Canterbury	26	16	0	10	851	644	+207	16	6	86	
6	Dorking	26	14	2	10	798	598	+200	13	6	79	
7	Westcombe Park	26	12	0	14	851	751	+100	19	8	75	
8	Havant	26	11	1	14	840	960	−120	19	1	66	
9	London Welsh	26	10	0	16	705	866	−161	16	8	64	
10	Guernsey Raiders	26	11	1	14	690	875	−185	13	3	62	
11	Esher	26	10	0	16	844	831	+13	16	6	62	
12	Henley Hawks	26	9	2	15	693	665	+28	12	9	61	Relegation Play-off
13	Sevenoaks (R)	26	8	0	18	743	900	−157	12	5	49	Relegation place
14	Oxford Harlequins (R)	26	2	0	24	505	1462	−957	11	2	21	Relegation place

Updated to match(es) played on 2 May 2026. Source: National League Rugby
Rules for classification: If teams are level at any stage, tiebreakers are applied in the following order:
1. Number of matches won
2. Number of matches drawn
3. Difference between points for and against
4. Total number of points for
5. Aggregate number of points scored in matches between tied teams
6. Number of matches won excluding the first match, then the second and so on until the tie is settled

== Honours ==
=== Men's ===
- Siam Cup champions (15 times)
- Hampshire Bowl winners: 2002
- Level 8 Hampshire 1 champions: 2003–04, promoted to level 7
- Level 7 London Division 2 South West champions: 2010–11, promoted to level 6
- Level 6 London Division 1 South champions: 2011–12, promoted to level 5
- LSE Premier v SW Premier promotion play-off winners: 2017–18, promoted to level 4

=== Women's ===
- Level 5 Women's National Challenge South East South 2 champions: 2014–15, promoted to level 4
- Level 4 Women's National Challenge South East South 1 champions: 2016–17, promoted to level 3

== Notable players ==
- Luke Jones – originally played for Guernsey before moving to English Premiership team, Leicester Tigers and the Cornish Pirates.

== See also ==
- English rugby union system
- Rugby Football Union for Women
