= Sevenoaks RFC =

English rugby union club, based in Sevenoaks, London

(England) Sevenoaks
- Full name: Sevenoaks Rugby Football Club
- Union: KRFU
- Location: Sevenoaks, Kent
- Ground: Knole Paddock (Capacity: 1,000)
- Coach(es): Adam Bowman, Brayden Porteous, Mike Hebden, Paul Dawson
- League: National League 2 East
- 2025–26: 13th (relegated to Regional 1 South Central)
Team kit

Official website
- sevenoaksrugby.com

Sevenoaks Rugby Football Club is an English rugby union club based in Sevenoaks, Kent. The club ground is on Plymouth Drive to the east of the town centre. The first XV team currently play in Regional 1 South Central following their relegation from National League 2 East at the end of 2025–26 season. The club operates five senior teams<ref2025–26]

== Current standings ==
2025–26 National League 2 East table
Pos	Team	Pld	W	D	L	PF	PA	PD	TB	LB	Pts	Qualification
1	Bury St Edmunds (C)	26	20	1	5	1128	659	+469	22	4	108	Promotion place
2	Oundle	26	20	2	4	940	713	+227	21	1	106	Promotion Play-off
3	Old Albanian	26	18	0	8	1009	813	+196	22	3	97	
4	Barnes	26	16	1	9	738	598	+140	15	5	86	
5	Canterbury	26	16	0	10	851	644	+207	16	6	86	
6	Dorking	26	14	2	10	798	598	+200	13	6	79	
7	Westcombe Park	26	12	0	14	851	751	+100	19	8	75	
8	Havant	26	11	1	14	840	960	−120	19	1	66	
9	London Welsh	26	10	0	16	705	866	−161	16	8	64	
10	Guernsey Raiders	26	11	1	14	690	875	−185	13	3	62	
11	Esher	26	10	0	16	844	831	+13	16	6	62	
12	Henley Hawks	26	9	2	15	693	665	+28	12	9	61	Relegation Play-off
13	Sevenoaks (R)	26	8	0	18	743	900	−157	12	5	49	Relegation place
14	Oxford Harlequins (R)	26	2	0	24	505	1462	−957	11	2	21	Relegation place

Updated to match(es) played on 2 May 2026. Source: National League Rugby
Rules for classification: If teams are level at any stage, tiebreakers are applied in the following order:
1. Number of matches won
2. Number of matches drawn
3. Difference between points for and against
4. Total number of points for
5. Aggregate number of points scored in matches between tied teams
6. Number of matches won excluding the first match, then the second and so on until the tie is settled

== Honours ==
- Kent 2 champions: 1988–89
- Kent 1 champions: 1994–95
- Kent Cup winners: 1997
- London 2 South East v South West play-off winners (2): 2004–05, 2015–16
- Kent Plate winners: 2013
- London 1 South champions: 2018–19
- London & South East Premier champions: 2021–22
