= Jersey RFC =

Jersey rugby union club, based in St Peter, Jersey

- Full name: Jersey Rugby Football Club
- Union: Rugby Football Union
- Founded: 2013; 13 years ago (as Jersey Athletic)
- Location: St Peter, Jersey
- Ground: St. Peter
- Director of Rugby: Myles Landick
- Coach: Myles Landick
- League: Regional 1 South Central
- 2025–26: 1st (promoted to National League 2 East.

Jersey Rugby Football Club is an amateur rugby union club based in Saint Peter, Jersey. They were formerly a part of Jersey Reds as Jersey Athletic but separated in 2022 and are now known by the original name, Jersey RFC. The 1st XV play in National League 2 East – a league at level 5 of the English rugby union system – following their promotion from Regional 1 South Central in 2025–26 season.

== History ==
Jersey Athletic was founded in 2013 as a way for amateurs in Jersey to have a chance to play for Jersey. They would play in the Zoo Sports shield for reserve teams. They would also host sides touring Jersey, often following the first team after high-profile friendlies such as playing Tunbridge Wells after the first team had played Bath Rugby. Myles Landick after retiring from playing became the head coach of Jersey Athletic in 2015. In 2017, Jersey Reds announced they would look into entering Jersey Athletic in the English rugby pyramid, however this was not permitted due to Rugby Football Union rules at the time that forbade clubs having two teams in the league system.

=== Separation ===
In 2022, Jersey Reds applied to the Rugby Football Union to split off Jersey Athletic as a separate club. Their rationale was that it was no longer suitable for a professional club to be run by amateur members and would free up resources. In July 2022, the RFU approved the split which allowed Jersey Athletic, renamed Jersey RFC, to enter the English leagues on their own. Due to a restructuring of English rugby, Jersey RFC were placed in Counties 1 Hampshire at level 7 of the English rugby pyramid instead of at the bottom. Jersey RFC played their first match as an independent club in August 2022 against Oxford Harlequins at St Peter as part of a double-header as Jersey Reds played London Irish prior. In their debut season, they were promoted as champions of Counties 1 Hampshire. Despite Jersey Reds suspending trading in September 2023, Jersey RFC continued due to their legal separation. They subsequently won promotion in their next season.

== Honours ==
- Counties 1 Hampshire (level 7) champions: 2022–23
- Regional 1 South Central (level 6) champions: 2023–24
- Regional 1 South Central (level 5) champions: 2025–26
