= Barnes RFC =

English rugby union club, based in London

Coordinates: 51°28′30″N 0°14′13″W

(England) Barnes
- Full name: Barnes Rugby Football Club
- Union: Middlesex RFU, Surrey RFU
- Founded: c. 1920 (as Harrodians RFC)
- Location: Barnes, Richmond upon Thames, London, England
- Ground: Barn Elms (Capacity: 1,000)
- Chairman: Colum Mannix
- League: National League 2 East
- 2025–26: 4th
| 1st kit | 2nd kit |

Official website
- www.barnesrfc.org

Barnes Rugby Football Club (formerly Harrodians Rugby Football Club) is a rugby union club based in Barnes, London. The club currently play in the fourth tier of the English league system, National League 2 East, following an increase of fourth tier leagues from two to three.

== History ==
The club's website states that it was established in Barnes in the 1920s. For many years the club played at the Harrodian Club before moving to its Barn Elms location in 1987 when the grounds were sold to form a school. Barnes RFC first XV has been promoted eight times since being positioned in Surrey Division Three in 1987. The club changed its name from Harrodians to Barnes at the beginning of the 1992–93 season.

=== Claim of continuity with Barnes Football Club ===
In 2002, the club's website claimed continuity with Barnes Football Club, stating that "[o]ur earliest recorded match was November 1862 versus Richmond, played at Barn Elms. We won that match and the replay that followed. For many years we played as Harrodians RFC before moving to our Barn Elms location in 1987." In 2005, this claim was amplified in The Daily Telegraph by BBC sports presenter John Inverdale. Inverdale, who stated that he was "[f]or reasons that I'm not altogether clear about, ... one of a number of vice-presidents" of Barnes RFC, wrote that "in 1839, according to the club records, Barnes RFC were born, playing fixtures against a whole mish-mash of teams of which no match results have been kept."

In 2008, the rugby club's website weakened this claim, stating only that "Barnes Rugby Club is a club with a rich history and was established in Barnes in the 1920s. Although there are indeed possibilities that our earliest recorded match was in November 1862 versus Richmond and played at Barn Elms, it is from the 1920s that our true history is clear." As of 2018, similar wording remains on the current version of the rugby club's website.

== Honours ==
- Surrey 3 champions: 1987–88 (Note: Won when club was known as Harrodians RFC.)
- Surrey 2 champions (2): 1988–89, 1992–93 (Note: Both titles won when club was known as Harrodians RFC – 1988–89 title was for Surrey 2A.)
- Surrey 1 champions: 1995–96
- London 2 (south-east v south-west) promotion play-off winner: 2002–03
- London Division 2 South champions: 2004–05
- National League 3 (south-east v south-west) promotion play-off winners (2): 2008–09, 2014–15
- London & South East Premier champions (2): 2010–11, 2017–18

== Current standings ==
2025–26 National League 2 East table
| Pos | Team | Pld | W | D | L | PF | PA | PD | TB | LB | Pts | Qualification |
|---|---|---|---|---|---|---|---|---|---|---|---|---|
| 1 | Bury St Edmunds (C) | 26 | 20 | 1 | 5 | 1128 | 659 | +469 | 22 | 4 | 108 | Promotion place |
| 2 | Oundle | 26 | 20 | 2 | 4 | 940 | 713 | +227 | 21 | 1 | 106 | Promotion Play-off |
| 3 | Old Albanian | 26 | 18 | 0 | 8 | 1009 | 813 | +196 | 22 | 3 | 97 | |
| 4 | Barnes | 26 | 16 | 1 | 9 | 738 | 598 | +140 | 15 | 5 | 86 | |
| 5 | Canterbury | 26 | 16 | 0 | 10 | 851 | 644 | +207 | 16 | 6 | 86 | |
| 6 | Dorking | 26 | 14 | 2 | 10 | 798 | 598 | +200 | 13 | 6 | 79 | |
| 7 | Westcombe Park | 26 | 12 | 0 | 14 | 851 | 751 | +100 | 19 | 8 | 75 | |
| 8 | Havant | 26 | 11 | 1 | 14 | 840 | 960 | −120 | 19 | 1 | 66 | |
| 9 | London Welsh | 26 | 10 | 0 | 16 | 705 | 866 | −161 | 16 | 8 | 64 | |
| 10 | Guernsey Raiders | 26 | 11 | 1 | 14 | 690 | 875 | −185 | 13 | 3 | 62 | |
| 11 | Esher | 26 | 10 | 0 | 16 | 844 | 831 | +13 | 16 | 6 | 62 | |
| 12 | Henley Hawks | 26 | 9 | 2 | 15 | 693 | 665 | +28 | 12 | 9 | 61 | Relegation Play-off |
| 13 | Sevenoaks (R) | 26 | 8 | 0 | 18 | 743 | 900 | −157 | 12 | 5 | 49 | Relegation place |
| 14 | Oxford Harlequins (R) | 26 | 2 | 0 | 24 | 505 | 1462 | −957 | 11 | 2 | 21 | Relegation place |

Updated to match(es) played on 2 May 2026. Source: National League Rugby
Rules for classification: If teams are level at any stage, tiebreakers are applied in the following order:
1. Number of matches won
2. Number of matches drawn
3. Difference between points for and against
4. Total number of points for
5. Aggregate number of points scored in matches between tied teams
6. Number of matches won excluding the first match, then the second and so on until the tie is settled
