= Henley Hawks =

English rugby union club, based in Oxfordshire

(England) Henley Hawks
- Full name: Henley Rugby Club
- Founded: August 1930; 95 years ago
- Location: Henley-on-Thames, Oxfordshire, England
- Ground: Dry Leas (Capacity: 4,000)
- League: National League 2 East
- 2025–26: 12th (won relegation play-off)
Team kit

Official website
- henleyrugbyclub.co.uk

Henley Hawks is a rugby union club based in Henley-on-Thames and is one of the leading rugby clubs in the Thames Valley. The first team play in the fourth tier of the English league system; National League 2 East.

== History ==
Henley RFC was founded in August 1930 as Old Henleiensians (old boys of Henley Grammar School). After a break during the war years the club was re-founded in 1954 and changed its name to Henley RFC in 1963. It has been based at Dry Leas since then.

=== Recent playing record ===
Henley's fortunes stood still until Clive Woodward, England's future World Cup winning manager, became the 1st XV coach in 1990. His introduction of the "flat ball" philosophy was a pioneering event for British rugby and brought promotion in 1992. Henley gained a further promotion in 1994 to the National Leagues and, after Woodward departed to coach London Irish, Henley continued to play fluid rugby and two further promotions ensued (in the 1997–98 and 1998–99 seasons), landing the club in what is now National Division One. Also in 1999, Henley enjoyed a record run in the Tetley's Bitter Cup, defeating the Premier 1 club Bedford in the fourth round before bowing out to Gloucester at Kingsholm.

Henley finished ninth in National One in 1999–00, seventh in 2000–01 but finished 13th in 2001–02 and were relegated to National Division Two. They regained their place in National One by finishing second in 2002–03 but two years later were relegated back into National Two. After flirting with promotion from National Division Two in season 2006–7, finishing third by one point to Launceston, the following season was little short of disastrous resulting in relegation to National Division 3 (South). Last season, 2009–10 they struggled during the middle part of the season to face further relegation worries but a good finish to the year resulted in a mid-table finish. This season has seen a large improvement on the previous season's performances especially during the middle of the year and the squad are hopeful of a top 6 finish. On 4 May 2013, Henley Hawks beat Worthing 55–27 to secure a place in National Division One for the 2013–14 season.

The Hawks squad is now coached by Rob Cain.

== Current standings ==
2025–26 National League 2 East table
Pos	Team	Pld	W	D	L	PF	PA	PD	TB	LB	Pts	Qualification
1	Bury St Edmunds (C)	26	20	1	5	1128	659	+469	22	4	108	Promotion place
2	Oundle	26	20	2	4	940	713	+227	21	1	106	Promotion Play-off
3	Old Albanian	26	18	0	8	1009	813	+196	22	3	97	
4	Barnes	26	16	1	9	738	598	+140	15	5	86	
5	Canterbury	26	16	0	10	851	644	+207	16	6	86	
6	Dorking	26	14	2	10	798	598	+200	13	6	79	
7	Westcombe Park	26	12	0	14	851	751	+100	19	8	75	
8	Havant	26	11	1	14	840	960	−120	19	1	66	
9	London Welsh	26	10	0	16	705	866	−161	16	8	64	
10	Guernsey Raiders	26	11	1	14	690	875	−185	13	3	62	
11	Esher	26	10	0	16	844	831	+13	16	6	62	
12	Henley Hawks	26	9	2	15	693	665	+28	12	9	61	Relegation Play-off
13	Sevenoaks (R)	26	8	0	18	743	900	−157	12	5	49	Relegation place
14	Oxford Harlequins (R)	26	2	0	24	505	1462	−957	11	2	21	Relegation place

Updated to match(es) played on 2 May 2026. Source: National League Rugby
Rules for classification: If teams are level at any stage, tiebreakers are applied in the following order:
1. Number of matches won
2. Number of matches drawn
3. Difference between points for and against
4. Total number of points for
5. Aggregate number of points scored in matches between tied teams
6. Number of matches won excluding the first match, then the second and so on until the tie is settled

== Ground ==
The ground is leased from the Town Council with the unexpired portion being nearly fifty years. When the leagues were started in 1987 Henley were placed in South West II. Henley have developed a working relationship with London Wasps, who for many seasons from 2005 used Dry Leas for their A-team matches, and also loaned squad players to Henley for development. Wasps moved their A league matches to Maidenhead Rugbys all weather pitch and since their move to Coventry in 2015 have used Henley again on a couple of occasions.

== Honours ==
1st team:

- Oxfordshire RFU County Cup winners (8): 1979, 1983, 1985, 1991, 1992, 1993, 1994, 1995
- South West 2 champions: 1991–92
- South West 1 champions: 1993–94
- National League 1 champions: 1998–99
- National League 2 South champions (2): 2012–13, 2014–15

2nd team:

- Oxfordshire RFU County Cup winners (3): 2001, 2003, 2005

3rd team:

- Berks/Bucks & Oxon 1 South champions: 2009–10
- Berks/Bucks & Oxon Premier A champions: 2010–11
- Berks/Bucks & Oxon 2 champions: 2016–17

4th team:

- Berks/Bucks & Oxon 3 champions: 2014–15

== Notable players ==
- Canada – Kevin Tkachuk - Canada, Barbarians
- England – Ayoola Erinle - England, England Sevens, England Students, Barbarians
- England – Rochelle "Rocky" Clark - England, England Sevens, England Students, Barbarians
- England – Alec Hepburn - England, Scotland, London Welsh, Exeter Chiefs, Scarlets
- England – Josh McNally - England, London Welsh, London Irish, Bath, Cardiff
- England – Curtis Langdon - England, London Irish, Sale Sharks, Worcester Warriors, Montpellier, Northampton Saints
- England – Jack Willis - England, Wasps, Toulouse

== See also ==
- Summary of the English rugby union system.
