= Counties 2 Sussex =

Level 8 English Rugby Union League

- Current season or competition: 2024–25 Counties 2 Sussex
- Sport: Rugby union
- Instituted: 2022; 4 years ago
- Number of teams: 10
- Country: England
- Holders: Haywards Heath (2023–24) (promoted to Counties 1 Surrey/Sussex)
- Website: englandrugby.com

Counties 2 Sussex is a level 8 English Rugby Union League. It is made up of teams from Sussex with teams playing home and away matches from September through to April. Promoted teams move up to Counties 1 Surrey/Sussex relegated teams move down to Harvey’s brewery Counties 3 Sussex. It was previously known as Sussex 1 prior to the RFU Adult Competition Review. It is administered by Sussex Rugby. and the London & SE RFU.

Each year some of the clubs in this division also take part in the RFU Junior Vase - a level 9-12 national competition.

== Structure and format ==
The ten teams play home and away matches making a total of eighteen games each. The results contribute points to the league as follows:

- 4 points for a win
- 2 points for a draw
- 0 points for a loss, however
- 1 losing (bonus) point is awarded to a team that loses a match by 7 points or fewer
- 1 additional (bonus) point is awarded to a team scoring 4 tries or more in a match

== Teams for 2026-27 ==
Departing the league were Pulborough promoted to Counties 1 Hampshire. Also leaving were Jersey Royals (9th) and Crawley (10th) who did not return for the new season.

Team	Ground	Capacity	City/Area	Previous season
Brighton II	Waterhall Playing Fields		Brighton, East Sussex	4th
Burgess Hill	Southway Recreation Ground		Burgess Hill, West Sussex	Re-entry
Ditchling	Ditchling Recreation Ground		Ditchling, East Sussex	5th
Eastbourne II	Park Avenue		Eastbourne, East Sussex	8th
East Grinstead	Saint Hill		East Grinstead, West Sussex	2nd
Horsham II	Coolhurst Ground		Horsham, West Sussex	New entry
Hove II	Hove Recreation Ground		Hove, East Sussex	Re-entry
Lewes	Stanley Turner Ground		Lewes, East Sussex	6th
Seaford	Salts Recreation Ground		Seaford, East Sussex	3rd
Shoreham	Buckingham Park		Shoreham-By-Sea, West Sussex	7th

Locations of the 2026-27 Counties 2 Sussex 1 teams in West Sussex
Locations of the 2026-27 Counties 2 Sussex teams in East Sussex

== Teams for 2025–26 ==
Departing the league were Uckfield promoted to Counties 1 Surrey/Sussex. Also leaving were Worthing III (9th) and Hove II (10th) who did not return for the new season.

Team	Ground	Capacity	City/Area	Previous season
Brighton II	Waterhall Playing Fields		Brighton, East Sussex	7th
Crawley	Willoughby Fields		Crawley, West Sussex	5th
Ditchling	Ditchling Recreation Ground		Ditchling, East Sussex	6th
Eastbourne II	Park Avenue		Eastbourne, East Sussex	New entry
East Grinstead	Saint Hill		East Grinstead, West Sussex	Relegated from Counties 1 Sry/Ssx (11th)
Jersey Royals	Grainville Playing Fields		St Saviour, Jersey	New entry
Lewes	Stanley Turner Ground		Lewes, East Sussex	8th
Pulborough	Freelands		Pulborough, West Sussex	2nd
Seaford	Salts Recreation Ground		Seaford, East Sussex	3rd
Shoreham	Buckingham Park		Shoreham-By-Sea, West Sussex	4th

Locations of the 2025-26 Counties 2 Sussex 1 teams in West Sussex
Locations of the 2025-26 Counties 2 Sussex teams in East Sussex & the Channel Islands

== Teams for 2024–25 ==
Departing the league were Haywards Heath, promoted to Counties 1 Surrey/Sussex whilst Burgess Hill (9th in 2023–24) dropped out the competition. Coming in were Lewes (re-entry after a year away having won Counties 3 Sussex), Hove 2XV (re-entry having last competed in 2021–22) and Ditchling (re-entry after having last competed in season 2019–20).

The London & SE RFU published fixtures for the league in June 2024.

Team	Ground	Capacity	City/Area	Previous season
Brighton II	Waterhall Playing Fields		Brighton, East Sussex	4th
Crawley	Willoughby Fields		Crawley, West Sussex	8th
Ditchling	Ditchling Recreation Ground		Ditchling, East Sussex	Re-entry (3rd Counties 3 Sussex)
Hove II	Hove Recreation Ground		Hove, East Sussex	Re-entry
Lewes	Stanley Turner Ground		Lewes, East Sussex	Re-entry (Champions Counties 3 Sussex)
Pulborough	Freelands		Pulborough, West Sussex	3rd
Seaford	Salts Recreation Ground		Seaford, East Sussex	6th
Shoreham	Buckingham Park		Shoreham-By-Sea, West Sussex	2nd
Uckfield	Hempstead Playing Fields		Uckfield, East Sussex	7th
Worthing III	Roundstone Lane		Angmering, West Sussex	5th

Locations of the 2024-25 Counties 2 Sussex 1 teams in West Sussex
Locations of the 2024-25 Counties 2 Sussex teams in East Sussex

== Teams for 2023–24 ==
Departing the league were East Grinstead and Eastbourne, both promoted to Counties 1 Surrey/Sussex. Lewes did not return having finished 10th the previous season. In their place came Brighton 2XV and Worthing 3XV meaning the league ran with 9 sides.

Team	Ground	Capacity	City/Area	Previous season
Brighton II	Waterhall Playing Fields		Brighton, East Sussex	New-entry
Burgess Hill	Southway Recreation Ground		Burgess Hill, West Sussex	7th
Crawley	Willoughby Fields		Crawley, West Sussex	9th
Haywards Heath	Whitemans Green		Cuckfield, West Sussex	3rd
Pulborough	Freelands		Pulborough, West Sussex	4th
Seaford	Salts Recreation Ground		Seaford, East Sussex	8th
Shoreham	Buckingham Park		Shoreham-By-Sea, West Sussex	6th
Uckfield	Hempstead Playing Fields		Uckfield, East Sussex	5th
Worthing III	Roundstone Lane		Angmering, West Sussex	New entry

Locations of the 2023-24 Counties 2 Sussex 1 teams in West Sussex
Locations of the 2023-24 Counties 2 Sussex teams in East Sussex

== Teams for 2022–23 ==
This was the first season following the RFU Adult Competition Review. The league was substantially similar to Sussex 1 but was supplemented by two teams from London 3 South East - Crawley and Pulborough - and the addition of Shoreham and Haywards Heath.

Haywards Heath had won London 2 South East in 2019–20 and were scheduled to join London 1 South but with the leagues being abandoned for 2020–21 this did not happen and ahead of the 2021–22 season they withdrew from the league

Despite winning Sussex 1 in 2021-22 East Grinstead were not promoted since the league they would have been promoted to, London 3 South East, was disbanded and Counties 2 Sussex was itself a level 8 league as London 3SE had been. For East Grinstead the achievement was nevertheless significant as they continued their recovery having elected to take voluntary relegation to the Sussex Intermediate League in 2016 due to being left insolvent after their director (and financial backer) pulled out of the club.

Hellingly and Hove 2XV who had finished 7th and 8th respectively in Sussex 1 the previous season did not return.

Team	Ground	Capacity	City/Area	Previous season
Burgess Hill	Southway Recreation Ground		Burgess Hill, West Sussex	4th Sussex 1
Crawley	Willoughby Fields		Crawley, West Sussex	12th L3SE
Eastbourne	Park Avenue		Eastbourne, East Sussex	3rd Sussex 1
East Grinstead	Saint Hill		East Grinstead, West Sussex	1st Sussex 1
Haywards Heath	Whitemans Green		Cuckfield, West Sussex	Re-entry
Lewes	Stanley Turner Ground		Lewes, East Sussex	5th Sussex 1
Pulborough	Freelands		Pulborough, West Sussex	10th L3SE
Seaford	Salts Recreation Ground		Seaford, East Sussex	6th Sussex 1
Shoreham	Buckingham Park		Shoreham-By-Sea, West Sussex	Re-entry
Uckfield	Hempstead Playing Fields		Uckfield, East Sussex	2nd Sussex 1

Locations of the 2022-23 Counties 2 Sussex 1 teams in West Sussex
Locations of the 2022-23 Counties 2 Sussex teams in East Sussex
