= Brighton & Hove Sea Serpents RFC =

(England) Brighton & Hove Sea Serpents RFC
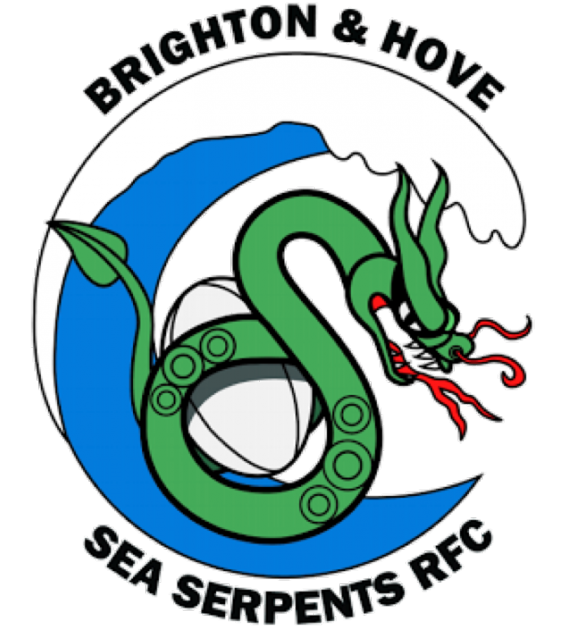
- Brighton & Hove Sea Serpents RFC
- Full name: Brighton & Hove Sea Serpents Rugby Football Club
- Unions: International Gay Rugby (IGR); RFU; Sussex RFU
- Nickname: Sea Serpents
- Founded: 4 November 2015
- Location: Brighton & Hove, England
- Ground(s): Hove Recreation Ground, Shirley Drive, Hove
- Chairman: Mackenzie Soley
- President: Ian Chaplin
- Coach: Tom Foy
- Captain: Dan Humphrey
- League: Harvey's of Sussex 4 West 'Wild Hop' League
Team kit

First match
- Sea Serpents 0 - 25 Kings Cross Steelers IV (20 February 2016)

Largest win
- Sea Serpents 92 - 7 Northampton Outlaws (12 November 2022)

Largest defeat
- Sea Serpents 3 - 104 St Leonards CP (15 October 2016)

Official website
- www.bhssrfc.com

Brighton & Hove Sea Serpents RFC is a gay and inclusive rugby union club based in Brighton & Hove in Sussex, England.

== History ==
The Brighton & Hove Sea Serpents were formed on 4 November 2015 at a meeting at the Camelford Arms pub in Kemptown, Brighton, to give gay and bisexual men the opportunity to play rugby in a friendly and relaxed atmosphere.

=== Season 2015/2016 ===
The Sea Serpents played their first match against the 4th XV of London's gay and inclusive rugby club, the Kings Cross Steelers, on 20 February 2016 at Hove Recreation Ground, losing by 25 points to 0. Over the next two months during March and April 2016, the Sea Serpents played a return match in London against the Steelers' 4th XV, an away match against the Birmingham Bulls, and were admitted as members of International Gay Rugby (IGR.)

=== Season 2016/2017 ===
The Sea Serpents kicked off their second season in existence with a summer touch rugby tournament in Birmingham organised by the Birmingham Bulls - Touch My Brum 2016. During the tournament the club registered their first ever win, a 2-1 victory against the Amsterdam Lowlanders. The club continued to play friendly matches against other IGR teams, and local Sussex teams. The Sea Serpents registered their first win in a full XVs match on 21 January 2017 against the Reading Renegades, a 37-3 victory, including 7 tries, also witnessed by the Mayor of Brighton & Hove. At the end-of-season Union Cup in Madrid, the Sea Serpents caused quite an upset by winning all of their group matches in the third-tier Union Bowl and making the Gold Final ahead of their closest rivals Kings Cross Steelers IV, the more established Bristol Bisons and Manchester Village Spartans III and the newly formed Munich Monks. They lost in the final to French side Rebelyons, finishing runners-up in their first international tournament.

=== Season 2017/2018 ===
Once again the Sea Serpents kicked off their season with a trip to the Birmingham Bulls touch rugby tournament finishing in the middle tier competition, a level above the previous year. The club was accepted into the Sussex Leagues and are competing in the Sussex Division 4 East against 9 other teams home and away. Their first league match was on 9 September 2017 against Heathfield & Waldron III at Hove Recreation Ground, the visitors winning 58-12. Their first league win came at the end of the season on 28 April 2018 against East Grinstead III in a double header match with the Sea Serpents winning 33-31.

=== Season 2018/2019 ===
The Sea Serpents were moved to the West division of the Sussex League's Division 4. After registering three losses, they won their 4th match of the season away at Burgess Hill by 62-12.

== Club crest and colours ==
The club's emblem depicts a rampant green sea serpent, carrying a white rugby ball, with a blue, rolling wave in the background, to signify the fact that Brighton & Hove is a seaside city. The club's colours are light blue and green, taken from the colours of the respective railings on the seafront in Brighton (light blue) and Hove (green), with the double symbolism of representing the English Channel and the South Downs which surround the city to the south and north respectively. The first kit used from the 2015/2016 season onwards was sponsored by the Camelford Arms, a pub in Brighton's gay village, and the site of the first meeting of the club in November 2015.

== Domestic league ==
The Sea Serpents took part in their first league campaign during the 2017/2018 season in the Sussex Division 4 East. The following season they were swapped to the West division.

=== League history ===
Season	Tournament	P	W	D	L	F	A	+/–	Pts	Pts %	Position
2017/2018	Sussex Division 4 East	14	3	0	11	209	665	-456	31	49%	7/10
2018/2019	Sussex Division 4 West	19	9	0	10	421	658	-237	47		3/8
2019/2020	Sussex Division 3 West										

4 points for a win, 3 points for a draw, 1 point for a loss, 1 point for an away match, 1 point for losing by 7 points or less

=== Domestic league matches ===
2017/2018 Sussex Division 4 East

9 Sep 2017 15:00

Brighton & Hove Sea Serpents RFC	12 – 58	Heathfield & Waldron RFC III
	Match Report

Hove

16 Sep 2017 15:00

Lewes RFC II	74 – 0	Brighton & Hove Sea Serpents RFC
	Match Report

Lewes

30 Sep 2017 15:00

Seaford RFC II	104 – 14^{D}	Brighton & Hove Sea Serpents RFC
	Match Report

Seaford

7 Oct 2017 15:00

Brighton & Hove Sea Serpents RFC	7 – 60	Hove RFC III
	Match Report

Hove

21 Oct 2017 15:00

Crowborough RFC III	0 – 40^{A}	Brighton & Hove Sea Serpents RFC
	Match Report

Crowborough

4 Nov 2017 14:30

St Francis RFC II	23 – 19	Brighton & Hove Sea Serpents RFC
	Match Report

Crawley

25 Nov 2017 14:30

Brighton & Hove Sea Serpents RFC	12 – 52	Crawley RFC III
	Match Report

Hove

2 Dec 2017 14:00

Heathfield & Waldron RFC III	78 – 5	Brighton & Hove Sea Serpents RFC
	Match Report

Heathfield

9 Dec 2017 14:00

Brighton & Hove Sea Serpents RFC	7 – 53	Lewes RFC II
	Match Report

Hove

6 Jan 2018 14:00

Brighton & Hove Sea Serpents RFC	C – C^{B}	Newick RFC II
	Match Report

Hove

13 Jan 2018 14:00

Brighton & Hove Sea Serpents RFC	10 – 34^{D}	Seaford RFC II
	Match Report

Hove

17 Feb 2018 14:30

Brighton & Hove Sea Serpents RFC	5 – 51	Crowborough RFC III
	Match Report

Hove

10 Mar 2018 15:00

Brighton & Hove Sea Serpents RFC	7 – 73	St Francis RFC II
	Match Report

Hove

24 Mar 2018 15:00

Crawley RFC III	32 – 24	Brighton & Hove Sea Serpents RFC
	Match Report

Crawley

21 Apr 2018 15:00

Hove RFC III	59 – 5	Brighton & Hove Sea Serpents RFC
	Match Report

Hove

28 Apr 2018 15:00

Brighton & Hove Sea Serpents RFC	33 – 31^{C}	East Grinstead RFC III
	Match Report

Hove

^A Match result: 36-19 to Crowborough RFC III. Awarded 40-0 to Brighton & Hove Sea Serpents RFC due to Crowborough RFC II cancelling their match.
^B Match was to be played as double header due to Newick RFC II cancelling first match. Newick RFC II also cancelled the second match and were removed from the league due to too many cancellations.
^C Match played as double header due to East Grinstead RFC III cancelling first match.
^D Seaford RFC II were removed from the league due to too many cancellations. Results against Seaford RFC II were nullified.

2018/2019 Sussex Division 4 West

8 Sep 2018 15:00

Horsham RFC III	50 – 7	Brighton & Hove Sea Serpents RFC
	Match Report

Horsham

15 Sep 2018 15:00

Crawley RFC III	37 – 34	Brighton & Hove Sea Serpents RFC
	Match Report

Crawley

22 Sep 2018 13:30

Brighton & Hove Sea Serpents RFC	15 – 59	BSMS RFC
	Match Report

Hove

29 Sep 2018 15:00

Burgess Hill RFC III	12 – 62	Brighton & Hove Sea Serpents RFC
	Match Report

Burgess Hill

6 Oct 2018 15:00

Worthing Knights	12 – 26	Brighton & Hove Sea Serpents RFC
	Match Report

Worthing

3 Nov 2018 14:30

Brighton & Hove Sea Serpents RFC	41 – 39	Crawley RFC III
	Match Report

Hove

17 Nov 2018 14:30

BSMS (Medics) RFC	0 – 40^{A}	Brighton & Hove Sea Serpents RFC
	Match Report

Falmer

1 Dec 2018 14:00

Brighton & Hove Sea Serpents RFC	40 - 0^{B}	Burgess Hill RFC III
	Match Report

Hove

8 Dec 2018 14:00

Brighton & Hove Sea Serpents RFC	28 - 27	Worthing Knights
	Match Report

Hove

15 Dec 2018 14:00

Brighton & Hove Sea Serpents RFC	10 - 12	Chichester RFC III
	Match Report

Hove

5 Jan 2019 14:00

Bognor RFC III	68 - 0	Brighton & Hove Sea Serpents RFC
	Match Report

Bognor

12 Jan 2019 14:00

Brighton & Hove Sea Serpents RFC	19 - 15	Horsham RFC III
	Match Report

Hove

26 Jan 2019 14:00

Chichester RFC III	78 - 14	Brighton & Hove Sea Serpents RFC
	Match Report

Chichester

9 Feb 2019 14:30

Bognor RFC III	65 - 14	Brighton & Hove Sea Serpents RFC
	Match Report

Bognor

16 Feb 2019 14:30

Brighton & Hove Sea Serpents RFC	52 - 22	Horsham RFC III
	Match Report

Hove

2 March 2019 15:00

Brighton & Hove Sea Serpents RFC	12 - 52	Bognor RFC III
	Match Report

Hove

23 March 2019 15:00

Brighton & Hove Sea Serpents RFC	40 - 0^{C}	Chichester RFC III
	Match Report

Hove

29 March 2019 19:30

Horsham RFC III	36 - 7	Brighton & Hove Sea Serpents RFC
	Match Report

^A Awarded 40-0 to Brighton & Hove Sea Serpents RFC due to BSMS (Medics) RFC cancelling their match.
^B Awarded 40-0 to Brighton & Hove Sea Serpents RFC due to Burgess Hill RFC III cancelling their match.
^C Awarded 40-0 to Brighton & Hove Sea Serpents RFC due to Chichester RFC III cancelling their match.

== International tournaments ==
The Sea Serpents took part in their first international tournament at the Union Cup in Madrid in April 2017 and were drawn in the third level competition - the Union Bowl.

=== Bingham Cup history ===
Year	Tournament	P	W	D	L	F	A	+/–	Win %	Round	Position	Overall rank
(Netherlands) Amsterdam 2018	Challenger Cup	6	4	0	2	97	61	+36	67%	Challenger Bowl	Winners	57th of 70
(Canada) Ottawa 2022	TBC											

=== Bingham Cup matches ===
Amsterdam 2018

Pool Q matches

8 June 2018 11:15

(England) Brighton & Hove Sea Serpents	13 – 12	Southern Barbarians (Australia) (New Zealand)

Amstelveen, Amsterdam

8 June 2018 14:55

(United States) Nashville Grizzlies	12 – 10	Brighton & Hove Sea Serpents (England)

Amstelveen, Amsterdam

9 June 2018 10:20

(France) Les Coqs Festifs	15 – 7	Brighton & Hove Sea Serpents (England)

Amstelveen, Amsterdam

Challenger Bowl/Shield Quarter Finals

9 June 2018 16:50

(England) Brighton & Hove Sea Serpents	28 – 5	Toronto Muddy York (Canada)

Amstelveen, Amsterdam

Challenger Bowl Semi Finals

10 June 2018 09:25

(England) Brighton & Hove Sea Serpents	22 – 5	Ottawa Wolves (Canada)

Amstelveen, Amsterdam

Challenger Bowl Final

10 June 2018 13:05

(England) Brighton & Hove Sea Serpents	17 – 12	Kings Cross Steelers D (England)

Amstelveen, Amsterdam

=== Union Cup history ===
Year	Tournament	P	W	D	L	F	A	+/–	Win %	Round	Position	Overall rank
(Spain) Madrid 2017	Union Bowl	4	3	0	1	76	25	+51	75%	Gold Final	Runners up	26th of 30
(Republic of Ireland) Dublin 2019	Cu Chulainn Bowl	4	2	0	2	64	43	+21	50%	Semi Final	Joint 3rd	23rd of 36
(England) Birmingham 2023	TBC											

=== Union Cup matches ===
Madrid 2017

Group matches

29 April 2017 13:05

(England) Brighton & Hove Sea Serpents	15 – 5	Bristol Bisons (England)

Orcasitas, Madrid

29 April 2017 17:40

(England) Brighton & Hove Sea Serpents	19 – 0	Manchester Village Spartans III (England)

Orcasitas, Madrid

30 April 2017 11:00

(England) Brighton & Hove Sea Serpents	42 – 3	Munich Monks (Germany)

Getafe, Madrid

Gold Final

30 April 2017 15:50

(France) Rebelyons	17 – 0	Brighton & Hove Sea Serpents (England)

Orcasitas, Madrid

Dublin 2019

Group matches

8 June 2019 08:50

(England) Brighton & Hove Sea Serpents	24 – 0	Straffe Ketten Brussels (Belgium)

DCU, Dublin

8 June 2019 11:50

(England) Brighton & Hove Sea Serpents	19 – 12	Kings Cross Steelers III (England)

DCU, Dublin

8 June 2019 16:30

(Italy) (Portugal) Libera Rugby/Lisbon Dark Horses	10 – 7	Brighton & Hove Sea Serpents (England)

DCU, Dublin

Semi Final

9 June 2019 09:20

(England) Kings Cross Steelers III	21 – 14	Brighton & Hove Sea Serpents (England)

DCU, Dublin
