= Counties 2 Kent =

English level 8 Rugby Union League

- Current season or competition: 2024–25 Counties 2 Kent
- Sport: Rugby union
- Instituted: 2000; 26 years ago (as London 4 South East)
- Number of teams: 12
- Country: England
- Most titles: Aylesford Bulls, Crowborough (2 titles)
- Website: englandrugby.com

Counties 2 Kent (formerly London 3 South East) is an English level 8 Rugby Union League involving club sides from Kent, East Sussex, West Sussex and the south-east London. The twelve teams play home and away matches from September to April. Following the RFU's Adult Competition Review, from season 2022–23 it adopted its current name Counties 2 Kent.

Promoted teams move up to Counties 1 Kent. Relegated teams drop down to Counties 3 Kent.

== Teams for 2026-27 ==
Departing were champions Tonbridge Juddians II and runners-up Thanet Wanderers promoted to Counties 1 Kent while Vigo were relegated to Counties 3 Kent.

Joining the league are Charlton Park and Cranbrook who were relegated from Counties 1 Kent Meanwhile Sittingbourne Counties 3 Kent (champions) and Tunbridge Wells II Counties 3 Kent (runners-up) Also join the league.

Team	Ground	Capacity	City/Area	Previous season
Aylesford Bulls	Jack Williams Ground		Aylesford, Kent	3rd
Beckenham II	Balmoral Avenue		Beckenham, London	9th
Charlton Park	Broad Walk		Kidbrooke, London	Relegated from Counties 1 Kent
Cranbrook	Tomlin Ground		Cranbrook, Kent	Relegated from Counties 1 Kent
Folkestone	New Burlington Ground		Newington, Folkestone, Kent	4th
Maidstone	William Davey Memorial Ground	2,000 (100 seats)	Maidstone, Kent	7th
Medway II	Priestfields		Rochester, Kent	10th
Old Alleynians II	The Common		Dulwich, London	5th
Sidcup II	Crescent Farm		Sidcup, Kent	8th
Sittingbourne	Gore Court Cricket Club		Sittingbourne, Kent	Promoted from Counties 3 Kent (champions)
Tunbridge Wells II	St Marks Recreation Ground	3,000	Royal Tunbridge Wells, Kent	Promoted from Counties 3 Kent (runners-up)
Westcombe Park II	Goddington Dene	3,200 (200 seats)	Orpington, London	6th

Locations of the 2026-27 Counties 2 Kent teams in London
Locations of the 2026-27 Counties 2 Kent teams in Kent

== Teams for 2025–26 ==
Departing were Old Elthamians and Gillingham Anchorians promoted to Counties 1 Kent while Dartford Valley were relegated to Counties 3 Kent.

Team	Ground	Capacity	City/Area	Previous season
Aylesford Bulls	Jack Williams Ground		Aylesford, Kent	7th
Beckenham II	Balmoral Avenue		Beckenham, London	Promoted from Counties 3 Kent (runners-up)
Folkestone	New Burlington Ground		Newington, Folkestone, Kent	4th
Maidstone	William Davey Memorial Ground	2,000 (100 seats)	Maidstone, Kent	10th
Medway II	Priestfields		Rochester, Kent	8th
Old Alleynians II	The Common		Dulwich, London	3rd
Sidcup II	Crescent Farm		Sidcup, Kent	5th
Thanet Wanderers	St Peter's Recreation Ground		Broadstairs, Kent	6th
Tonbridge Juddians II	The Slade	1,500	Tonbridge, Kent	Promoted from Counties 3 Kent (champions)
Vigo	Swanswood Field		Vigo, Kent	11th
Westcombe Park II	Goddington Dene	3,200 (200 seats)	Orpington, London	9th

Locations of the 2025–26 Counties 2 Kent teams in London
Locations of the 2025–26 Counties 2 Kent teams in Kent

== Teams for 2024–25 ==
Departing were Sevenoaks II and Park House promoted to Counties 1 Kent. Old Dunstonians were relegated to Counties 3 Kent.

Joining were Thanet Wanderers, relegated from Counties 1 Kent together with Old Alleynians II and Old Elthamians, both promoted from Counties 3 Kent.

Team	Ground	Capacity	City/Area	Previous season
Aylesford Bulls	Jack Williams Ground		Aylesford, Kent	5th
Dartford Valley	Leigh Academy		Dartford, Kent	10th
Folkestone	New Burlington Ground		Newington, Folkestone, Kent	4th
Gillingham Anchorians	Darland Banks		Gillingham, Kent	9th
Maidstone	William Davey Memorial Ground	2,000 (100 seats)	Maidstone, Kent	11th
Medway II	Priestfields		Rochester, Kent	8th
Old Alleynians II	The Common		Dulwich, London	Promoted from Counties 3 Kent (runners-up)
Old Elthamians	Hospital Ground		Chislehurst, London	Promoted from Counties 3 Kent (champions)
Sidcup II	Crescent Farm		Sidcup, Kent	6th
Thanet Wanderers	St Peter's Recreation Ground		Broadstairs, Kent	Relegated from Counties 1 Kent
Vigo	Swanswood Field		Vigo, Kent	7th
Westcombe Park II	Goddington Dene	3,200 (200 seats)	Orpington, London	3rd

Locations of the 2024–25 Counties 2 Kent teams in London
Locations of the 2024–25 Counties 2 Kent teams in Kent

== Teams for 2023–24 ==
Departing were Canterbury II and Dover promoted to Counties 1 Kent as joint champions. Southwark Lancers were relegated and moved on a level transfer to Counties 4 Surrey whilst Hastings & Bexhill were relegated to Counties 3 Kent.

Joining were Folkestone and Aylesford Bulls, both relegated from Counties 1 Kent together with Dartford Valley and Medway II, both promoted from Counties 3 Kent.

Team	Ground	Capacity	City/Area	Previous season
Aylesford Bulls	Jack Williams Ground		Aylesford, Kent	Relegated from Counties 1 Kent
Dartford Valley	Leigh Academy		Dartford, Kent	Promoted from Counties 3 Kent (runners-up)
Folkestone	New Burlington Ground		Newington, Folkestone, Kent	Relegated from Counties 1 Kent
Gillingham Anchorians	Darland Banks		Gillingham, Kent	5th
Maidstone	William Davey Memorial Ground	2,000 (100 seats)	Maidstone, Kent	10th
Medway II	Priestfields		Rochester, Kent	Promoted from Counties 3 Kent (champions)
Old Dunstonians	St. Dunstan's Lane		Beckenham, London	9th
Park House	Barnet Wood Road		Hayes, London	4th
Sevenoaks II	Knole Paddock	1,000	Sevenoaks, Kent	3rd
Sidcup II	Crescent Farm		Sidcup, Kent	6th
Vigo	Swanswood Field		Vigo, Kent	7th
Westcombe Park II	Goddington Dene	3,200 (200 seats)	Orpington, London	8th

Locations of the 2023–24 Counties 2 Kent teams in London
Locations of the 2023–24 Counties 2 Kent teams in Kent

== Teams for 2022–23 ==
This was the first season following the RFU Adult Competition Review with the league adopting its new name of Counties 2 Kent.

Returning were 6 of the 12 teams who competed in the previous season's league.

Departing were Bromley, Aylesford Bulls, Cranbrook and Heathfield & Waldron, all promoted to Counties 1 Kent. Also leaving on a level transfer to Counties 2 Sussex were Pulborough (10th) and Crawley (12th).

Joining were Hastings & Bexhill and Park House, both promoted. There were also new entries with the 2XVs from Sidcup, Canterbury, Sevenoaks and Westcombe Park added.

Team	Ground	Capacity	City/Area	Previous season
Canterbury II	Marine Travel Ground	1,500 (75 seats)	Canterbury, Kent	New entry
Dover	Crabble Athletic Ground		Dover, Kent	5th
Gillingham Anchorians	Darland Banks		Gillingham, Kent	8th
Hastings & Bexhill	William Parker Lower School		Hastings, East Sussex	Promoted from Kent 1
Maidstone	William Davey Memorial Ground	2,000 (100 seats)	Maidstone, Kent	11th
Old Dunstonians	St. Dunstan's Lane		Beckenham, London	7th
Park House	Barnet Wood Road		Hayes, London	Promoted from Kent 1
Sevenoaks II	Knole Paddock	1,000	Sevenoaks, Kent	New entry
Sidcup II	Crescent Farm		Sidcup, Kent	New entry
Southwark Lancers	Burgess Park		Camberwell, London	9th
Vigo	Swanswood Field		Vigo, Kent	6th
Westcombe Park II	Goddington Dene	3,200 (200 seats)	Orpington, London	New entry

Locations of the 2022–23 Counties 2 Kent teams in London
Locations of the 2022–23 Counties 2 Kent teams in Kent & East Sussex

== Teams for 2021–22 ==
The teams competing in 2021–22 season earned their places in the league based on their performances in the 2019–20, Thus, the 'previous season' column in the table below refers to the 2019–20 season, not the 2020–21 season.

Team	Ground	Capacity	City/Area	Previous season
Aylesford Bulls	Jack Williams Ground		Aylesford, Kent	8th
Bromley	Barnet Wood Road		Hayes, London	3rd
Crawley	Willoughby Fields		Crawley, West Sussex	Promoted from Sussex 1 (champions)
Cranbrook	Tomlin Ground		Cranbrook, Kent	Promoted from Kent 1 (runners-up)
Dover	Crabble Athletic Ground		Dover, Kent	Relegated from London 2 SE (11th)
Gillingham Anchorians	Darland Banks		Gillingham, Kent	9th
Heathfield & Waldron	Hardy Roberts Recreational Ground		Cross In Hand, Heathfield, East Sussex	6th
Maidstone	William Davey Memorial Ground	2,000 (100 seats)	Maidstone, Kent	Relegated from London 2 SE (12th)
Old Dunstonians	St. Dunstan's Lane		Beckenham, London	5th
Pulborough	Freelands		Pulborough, West Sussex	4th
Southwark Lancers	Burgess Park		Camberwell, London	Promoted from Kent 1 (champions)
Vigo	Swanswood Field		Vigo, Kent	7th

Locations of the 2021–22 London 3 South East teams in London
Locations of the 2021–22 London 3 South East teams in Kent, East Sussex & West Sussex

== Season 2020–21 ==
On 30 October 2020 the RFU announced that due to the coronavirus pandemic a decision had been taken to cancel Adult Competitive Leagues (National League 1 and below) for the 2020/21 season meaning London 3 South East was not contested.

== Teams for 2019–20 ==
Team	Ground	Capacity	City/Area	Previous season
Ashford	Kinney's Field		Ashford, Kent	Promoted from Kent 1 (champions)
Aylesford Bulls	Jack Williams Ground		Aylesford, Kent	Relegated from London 2 SE (11th)
Bromley	Barnet Wood Road		Hayes, London	9th
Folkestone	New Burlington Ground		Newington, Folkestone, Kent	3rd
Gillingham Anchorians	Darland Banks		Gillingham, Kent	Promoted from Kent 1 (playoff)
Heathfield & Waldron	Hardy Roberts Recreational Ground		Cross In Hand, Heathfield, East Sussex	Relegated from London 2 SE (12th)
Old Dunstonians	St. Dunstan's Lane		Beckenham, London	6th
Old Williamsonians	Sir Joseph Williamson's Mathematical School		Rochester, Kent	8th
Park House	Barnet Wood Road		Hayes, London	7th
Pulborough	Freelands		Pulborough, West Sussex	4th
Uckfield	Hempstead Playing Fields		Uckfield, East Sussex	Promoted from Sussex 1 (champions)
Vigo	Swanswood Field		Vigo, Kent	5th

Locations of the 2019–20 London 3 South East teams in London
Locations of the 2019–20 London 3 South East teams

== Teams for 2018–19 ==
Team	Ground	Capacity	City/Area	Previous season
Beccehamian	Sparrow's Den		West Wickham, London	Promoted from Kent 1 (champions)
Bromley	Barnet Wood Road		Hayes, London	3rd
Crowborough	Steel Cross		Crowborough, East Sussex	6th
Folkestone	New Burlington Ground		Newington, Folkestone, Kent	10th
Hastings & Bexhill	William Parker Lower School		Hastings, East Sussex	9th
Lewes	Stanley Turner Ground		Lewes, East Sussex	7th
Old Dunstonians	St. Dunstan's Lane		Beckenham, London	5th
Old Williamsonians	Sir Joseph Williamson's Mathematical School		Rochester, Kent	4th
Park House	Barnet Wood Road		Hayes, London	8th
Pulborough	Freelands		Pulborough, West Sussex	Relegated from London 2 SE (11th)
Vigo	Swanswood Field		Vigo, Kent	Promoted from Kent 1 (playoff)

Locations of the 2018–19 London 3 South East teams in London
Locations of the 2018–19 London 3 South East teams

== Teams for 2017–18 ==
Team	Ground	Capacity	City/Area	Previous season
Aylesford Bulls	Jack Williams Ground		Aylesford, Kent	7th
Bromley	Barnet Wood Road		Hayes, London	Relegated from London 2 South East (11th)
Crawley	Willoughby Fields		Crawley, West Sussex	Promoted from Sussex 1 (champions)
Crowborough	Green Lane		Crowborough, East Sussex	Relegated from London 2 South East (12th)
Folkestone	New Burlington Ground		Newington, Folkestone, Kent	4th
Hastings & Bexhill	William Parker Lower School		Hastings, East Sussex	Promoted from Kent 1 (champions)
Lewes	Stanley Turner Ground		Lewes, East Sussex	5th
Old Dunstonians	St. Dunstan's Lane		Beckenham, London	6th
Old Williamsonians	Sir Joseph Williamson's Mathematical School		Rochester, Kent	Promoted from Kent 1 (playoff)
Park House	Barnet Wood Road		Hayes, London	9th
Sheppey	Stupple Field		Minster, Kent	8th
Thanet Wanderers	St Peter's Recreation Ground		Broadstairs, Kent	3rd

Locations of the 2017–18 London 3 South East teams in London
Locations of the 2017–18 London 3 South East teams

== Teams for 2016–17 ==
- Ashford (relegated from London 2 South East)
- Aylesford Bulls
- Eastbourne
- Folkestone
- Gillingham Anchorians
- Haywards Heath (promoted from Sussex Spitfire 1)
- Lewes (promoted from Sussex Spitfire 1)
- Old Dunstonians
- Park House
- Pulborough
- Sheppey (promoted from Shepherd Neame Kent 1)
- Thanet Wanderers (relegated from London 2 South East)

== Teams for 2015–16 ==
- Aylesford Bulls (relegated from London 2 South East)
- Bromley
- Burgess Hill (promoted from Sussex Spitfire 1)
- Cranbrook (promoted from Shepherd Neame Kent 1)
- Eastbourne (promoted from Sussex Spitfire 1)
- Folkestone
- Gillingham Anchorians
- Heathfield & Waldron
- Old Dunstonians
- Park House
- Pulborough
- Uckfield

== Teams for 2014–15 ==
- Bromley
- Dartfordians
- Folkestone
- Gillingham Anchorians
- Hastings & Bexhill
- Heathfield & Waldron (relegated from London 2 South East)
- Horsham
- Lewes (relegated from London 2 South East)
- Old Dunstonians
- Park House
- Pulborough
- Uckfield

== Teams for 2013–14 ==
- Ashford
- Beccehamian (promoted from Shepherd Neame Kent 1)
- Bromley
- Burgess Hill (promoted from Sussex Spitfire 1)
- Dartfordians
- Folkestone
- Gillingham Anchorians
- Horsham
- Old Dunstonians
- Sheppey
- Thanet Wanderers
- Uckfield

== Teams for 2012–13 ==
- Ashford
- Bromley
- Folkestone
- Gillingham Anchorians
- Horsham
- Maidstone
- Park House
- Pulborough
- Sheppey
- Tunbridge Wells
- Uckfield
- Vigo

== Original teams ==
When this division was introduced in 2000 (as London 4 South East) it contained the following teams:

- Beccehamian - relegated from London 3 South East (10th)
- Bognor - promoted from Sussex 1 (champions)
- Chichester - relegated from London 3 South East (9th)
- Dartfordians - relegated from London 3 South East (10th)
- Eastbourne - relegated from London 3 South East (8th)
- Folkestone - relegated from London 3 South East (12th)
- Heathfield & Waldron - relegated from London 3 South East (11th)
- Hove - relegated from London 3 South East (14th)
- Old Dunstonians - promoted from Kent 1 (champions)
- Park House - relegated from London 3 South East (13th)

== London 3 South East honours ==
=== London 4 South East (2000–2009) ===
Originally known as London 4 South East, this division was a tier 8 league with promotion up to London 3 South East and relegation down to either Kent 1 or Sussex 1.

London 4 South East Honours
Season	No of teams	Champions	Runners–up	Relegated Teams
2000–01	10	Dartfordians	Old Dunstonians	Park House, Chichester, Heathfield & Waldron
2001–02	10	Betteshanger	Eastbourne	Askean, Cranbrook, Uckfield
2002–03	10	Chichester	Bognor	Heathfield & Waldron, Guys' Kings' & St Thomas' Hospital, Beccehamian
2003–04	10	Aylesford Bulls	Folkestone	Uckfield
2004–05	10	Old Dunstonians	Lordswood	Crawley, Ashford
2005–06	10	Old Elthamians	Betteshanger	East Grinstead, Horsham, Sittingbourne
2006–07	10	Eastbourne	Dover	Dartfordians, Brighton, Ashford
2007–08	10	Bognor	Hove	No relegation (Note: No relegation as league to increase from 10 to 12 teams for the following season.)
2008–09	12	Tonbridge Juddians	Bromley	Beccehamian
Green backgrounds are promotion places.

=== London 3 South East (2009–present) ===
League restructuring by the RFU ahead of the 2009–10 season saw London 4 South East renamed as London 3 South East. Remaining as a tier 8 league promotion was to London 2 South East (formerly London 3 South East), while relegation continued to either Kent 1 or Sussex 1.

London 3 South East
Season	No of teams	Champions	Runners–up	Relegated Teams
2009–10	12	East Grinstead	Brighton	Old Gravesendians, Whitstable, Hastings & Bexhill
2010–11	12	Heathfield & Waldron	Charlton Park	Dartfordians, Cranbrook, Crawley
2011–12	12	Crowborough	Medway	Eastbourne, Uckfield
2012–13	12	Maidstone	Tunbridge Wells	Vigo, Pulborough, Park House
2013–14	12	Thanet Wanderers	Ashford	Beccehamian, Burgess Hill, Sheppey
2014–15	12	Horsham	Dartfordians	Hastings & Bexhill, Lewes
2015–16	12	Bromley	Heathfield & Waldron	Uckfield, Burgess Hill
2016–17	12	Pulborough	Haywards Heath	Ashford, Eastbourne
2017–18	12	Aylesford Bulls	Thanet Wanderers	Crawley, Sheppey
2018–19	11 (Note: Only 11 teams this season after Hellingly dropped out of the league.)	Crowborough	Beccehamian	Lewes, Hastings & Bexhill
2019–20	12	Ashford	Folkestone	Old Williamsonians, Park House, Uckfield
2020–21	12			
Green backgrounds are promotion places.

== Number of league titles ==
- Aylesford Bulls (2)
- Crowborough (2)
- Ashford (1)
- Betteshanger (1)
- Bognor (1)
- Bromley (1)
- Chichester (1)
- Dartfordians (1)
- East Grinstead (1)
- Eastbourne (1)
- Heathfield & Waldron (1)
- Horsham (1)
- Maidstone (1)
- Old Dunstonians (1)
- Old Elthamians (1)
- Pulborough (1)
- Thanet Wanderers (1)
- Tonbridge Juddians (1)

== See also ==
- Kent RFU
- Sussex RFU
- English rugby union system
- Rugby union in England
