= Sussex 2 =

Rugby union league

- Current season or competition: 2019–20 Sussex 2 Armada Ale
- Sport: Rugby union
- Instituted: 1987; 39 years ago
- Number of teams: 8
- Country: England
- Holders: St. Jacques (1st title) (2018–19) (not promoted)
- Most titles: BA Wingspan, Pulborough, St. Francis (3 titles)
- Website: www.sussexrugby.co.uk

Sussex 2 is an English level 10 Rugby Union League. It is run by the Sussex Rugby Football Union and contains teams predominantly from West Sussex. The twelve teams play home and away matches from September through to April. Promoted teams move up to Sussex 1 and demoted teams fall to Sussex 3. Up until 2003-04 the league was known as Sussex 2 which was abolished at the end of that season. Sussex Canterbury Jack Intermediate emerged in 2010-11 as the second-tier competition for Sussex with a large number of 2nd, 3rd and 4th teams taking part. The division name changed to Sussex Canterbury Jack Division 2 for the 2016–17 season. A further name change resulted in Sussex Canterbury Jack 2 becoming Sussex 2 Armada Ale for the 2017–18 season.

== Original teams ==
When league rugby began in 1987 this division contained the following teams:

- Azurians
- British Caledonian (Note: British Caledonian would be renamed as British Airways Wingspan RFC in 1988 following the takeover of British Caledonian by British Airways.)
- Heathfield & Waldron
- Hellingly
- Plumpton
- St. Francis
- Uckfield
- University of Sussex

== Sussex 2 honours ==
=== Sussex 2 (1987–1993) ===
The original Sussex 2 was a tier 9 league with promotion up to Sussex 1 and relegation down to Sussex 3 until that division was abolished at the end of the 1991–92 season.

Sussex 2
Season	No of Teams	Champions	Runners–up	Relegated Teams
1987–88	8	Uckfield	Hellingly	Azurians
1988–89	9	Heathfield & Waldron	St. Francis	British Caledonian (Note: Relegated British Caledonian would be renamed as British Airways Wingspan RFC from the following season onward.)
1989–90	9	Hastings & Bexhill	Old Brightonian	University of Sussex
1990–91	10	St. Francis	Hellingly	RMP Chichester, (Note: Bottom club RMP Chichester would drop out the Sussex leagues.) Plumpton
1991–92	9	Seaford	Crowborough	No relegation (Note: The cancellation of Sussex 3 at the end of the season meant that there was no relegation.)
1992–93	8	BA Wingspan	Ditchling	No relegation
Green backgrounds are promotion places.

=== Sussex 2 (1993–1996) ===
The creation of National 5 South meant that Sussex 2 dropped from a tier 9 league to a tier 10 league for the years that National 5 South was active. Promotion was to Sussex 1, and relegation was to Sussex 3, which was reinstated for the 1994–95 season after a two-year absence.

Sussex 2
Season	No of Teams	Champions	Runners–up	Relegated Teams
1993–94	8	Pulborough	Sunallon (Note: Promoted Sunallon would rename as Sun Alliance for the following season.)	Midhurst (Note: The reintroduction of Sussex 3 meant that there was once again relegation from Sussex 2.)
1994–95	6	BA Wingspan	Hellingly	Plumpton, Sussex Police
1995–96	6	Ditchling	Crowborough	Rye, Shoreham
Green backgrounds are promotion places.

=== Sussex 2 (1996–2000) ===
The cancellation of National 5 South at the end of the 1995–96 season meant that Sussex 2 reverted to being a tier 9 league. Promotion and relegation continued to Sussex 1 and Sussex 3 respectively.

Sussex 2
Season	No of Teams	Champions	Runners–up	Relegated Teams
1996–97	7	BA Wingspan	Sun Alliance	Plumpton
1997–98	8	Burgess Hill	Old Brightonian	Sussex Police, Rye
1998–99	8	Pulborough	Hellingly	Robertsbridge, St. Francis
1999–00	8	Chichester IHE	Newick	No relegation (Note: No relegation as Sussex 3 abolished at the end of the season.)
Green backgrounds are promotion places.

=== Sussex 2: East / West (2000–2002) ===
Restructuring of the London & South East leagues ahead of the 2000–01 saw the cancellation of Sussex 3 for the second time, and Sussex 2 divided into two regional divisions - Sussex 2 East and Sussex 2 West. Additionally, both regional divisions dropped to tier 10 leagues due to the introduction of London 4 South East. Promotion continued to Sussex 1 and there was no longer relegation.

Sussex 2: East / West
Season	No of Teams	Champions	Runners–up	Relegated Teams	League Name
2000–01	7	Rye	Sussex Police	No relegation	Sussex 2 East
2000–01	7	St. Francis	Shoreham	No relegation	Sussex 2 West
2001–02	7	Seaford	Newick	Plumpton, Robertsbridge, Ditchling, Old Brightonian (Note: Many relegation's this season as Sussex 3 would return for the following season and Sussex 2 East would re-merge with Sussex 2 West to form a single division Sussex 2.)	Sussex 2 East
2001–02	8	Pulborough	Holbrook	Arun, Shoreham, BA Wingspan (Note: Many relegations this season as Sussex 3 would return for the following season and Sussex 2 West would remerge with Sussex 2 East to form a single division Sussex 2.)	Sussex 2 West
Green backgrounds are promotion places.

=== Sussex 2 (2002–2004) ===
Sussex 2 was re-merged back into a single division ahead of the 2002–03 season, remaining at tier 10 of the league system. Promotion was to Sussex 1 and relegation to Sussex 3, which returned after an absence of two seasons. Sussex 2 was abolished at the end of the 2003–04 season.

Sussex 2
Season	No of Teams	Champions	Runners–up	Relegated Teams
2002–03	8	Burgess Hill	Barns Green	Norfolk Arms
2003–04	7	St. Francis (Note: No promotion or relegation as Sussex 2 and Sussex 3 would be abolished at the end of the season. Sussex 2 and 3's equivalents would reappear in 2010–11 as Sussex Canterbury Jack Intermediate.)	Old Brightonian	No relegation
Green backgrounds are promotion places.

=== Sussex Canterbury Jack Intermediate (2010–2015) ===
Sussex 2 was reintroduced for the 2010–11 season as Sussex Canterbury Jack Intermediate. It was a tier 10 league with promotion up to Sussex 1 and relegation to either Sussex Asahi 2 East or Sussex Oranjeboom 2 West.

Sussex Canterbury Jack Intermediate
Season	No of Teams	Champions	Runners–up	Relegated Teams
2010–11	12	Chichester III	Bognor II	Hastings & Bexhill II, Norfolk Arms, Hove IV
2011–12	12	Midhurst	Hove III	Bognor II, St. Francis
2012–13	12	Hove IV (Note: Despite finishing as league champions Hove IV would be relegated due to Hove III dropping down from the division above.)	Crawley (Note: 3rd place Crowborough II also promoted.)	Eastbourne II, Uckfield II
2013–14	13	Worthing Senior I	Hellingly	Hove III, Littlehampton, Plumpton
2014–15	12	Haywards Heath II (Note: Despite winning the league - Haywards Heath II would be demoted to Sussex Late Red 3 due to the Haywards Heath 1st team being demoted into Sussex 1.)	Midhurst	Lewes II, Newick
Green backgrounds are promotion places.

=== Sussex 2 (2015–present) ===
Sussex Canterbury Jack Intermediate was renamed to Sussex 2 for the 2015–16 season. It remained a tier 10 league with promotion to Sussex 1, while relegation was now to Sussex Oranjeboom 3.

Sussex 2
Season	No of Teams	Champions	Runners–up	Relegated Teams
2015–16	12	Bognor II	Shoreham	Holbrook, Norfolk Arms
2016–17	11	East Grinstead	Ditchling (Note: 4th placed Barns Green were also promoted - going up instead of 3rd placed Pulborough II.)	Sussex Police, Crowborough II
2017–18	9	Plumpton	St. Jacques	No relegation
2018–19	8	St. Jacques	Barns Green	No relegation
Green backgrounds are promotion places.

== Number of league titles ==
- BA Wingspan (3)
- Pulborough (3) (Note: One of Pulborough's titles was for Sussex 2 West.)
- St. Francis (3) (Note: One of St. Francis's titles was for Sussex 2 West.)
- Burgess Hill (2)
- Seaford (2) (Note: One of Seaford's title was for Sussex 2 East.)
- Bognor II (1)
- Chichester III (1)
- Chichester IHE (1)
- Ditchling (1)
- East Grinstead (1)
- Hastings & Bexhill (1)
- Haywards Heath II (1)
- Heathfield & Waldron (1)
- Hove IV (1)
- Midhurst (1)
- Plumpton (1)
- Rye (1) (Note: Rye's title was for Sussex 2 East.)
- St. Jacques (1)
- Uckfield (1)
- Worthing Senior I (1)

== See also ==
- London & SE Division RFU
- Sussex RFU
- English rugby union system
- Rugby union in England
