= London 2 South East =

Defunct English rugby union league

- Sport: Rugby union
- Instituted: 1987; 39 years ago (as London 3 South East)
- Number of teams: 12
- Country: England
- Holders: Haywards Heath (1st title) (2019–20) (promoted to London 1 South)
- Most titles: Tunbridge Wells (4 titles)
- Website: englandrugby.com

London 2 South East was an English level 7 Rugby Union League. When this division began in 1987 it was known as London 3 South East, changing to its latest name ahead of the 2009–10 season. The division was made up of teams predominantly from south-east London, Kent, East Sussex and West Sussex. The twelve teams play home and away matches from September through to April. Each year the clubs also took part in the RFU Intermediate Cup – a level 7 national competition.

Teams were promoted to London 1 South with the league champions being promoted automatically and the runner-up playing the runner-up from London 2 South West for the second promotion place. London 3 South East was the main destination for relegated teams

== 2021–22 ==
The teams competing in 2021–22 achieved their places in the league based on performances in 2019–20, the 'previous season' column in the table below refers to that season not 2020–21.

Team	Ground	Capacity	City/Area	Previous season
Ashford	Kinney's Field		Ashford, Kent	Promoted from London 3SE (champions)
Beccehamian	Sparrow's Den		West Wickham, London	9th
Beckenham	Balmoral Avenue		Beckenham, London	Relegated from London 1 South (14th)
Charlton Park	Broad Walk	1,500 (300 seats)	Kidbrooke, London	4th
Crowborough	Steel Cross		Crowborough, East Sussex	5th
Dartfordians	Bourne Road		Bexley, London	Relegated from London 1 South (13th)
Deal & Betteshanger	The Drill Field		Deal, Kent	8th
Folkestone	New Burlington Ground		Newington, Folkestone, Kent	Promoted from London 3SE (2nd)
Gravesend	Rectory Field		Gravesend, Kent	6th
Old Alleynians	Dulwich Common		Dulwich, London	3rd
Old Colfeians	Lee		Lee, London	2nd
Thanet Wanderers	St Peter's Recreation Ground		Broadstairs, Kent	10th

Locations of the 2021–22 London 2 South East teams in London
Locations of the 2021–22 London 2 South East teams in Kent and East Sussex

== 2020–21 ==
On 30 October the RFU announced that a decision had been taken to cancel Adult Competitive Leagues (National League 1 and below) for the 2020–21 season meaning London 2 South East was not contested.

== 2019–20 ==
Team	Ground	Capacity	City/Area	Previous season
Beccehamian	Sparrow's Den		West Wickham, London	Promoted from London 3 SE (2nd)
Charlton Park	Broad Walk	1,500 (300 seats)	Kidbrooke, London	3rd
Crowborough	Steel Cross		Crowborough, East Sussex	Promoted from London 3 SE (champions)
Deal & Betteshanger	The Drill Field		Deal, Kent	7th
Dover	Crabble Athletic Ground		Dover, Kent	9th
Gravesend	Rectory Field		Gravesend, Kent	6th
Haywards Heath	Whitemans Green		Cuckfield, West Sussex	4th
Hove	Hove Recreation Ground		Hove, East Sussex	Relegated from London 1 South (14th)
Maidstone	William Davey Memorial Ground	2,000 (100 seats)	Maidstone, Kent	10th
Old Alleynians	Dulwich Common		Dulwich, London	Level transfer from London 2 SW (4th)
Old Colfeians	Lee		Lee, London	5th

Locations of the 2019–20 London 2 South East teams in London
Locations of the 2019–20 London 2 South East teams

== 2018–19 ==
Team	Ground	Capacity	City/Area	Previous season
Aylesford Bulls	Jack Williams Ground		Aylesford, Kent	Promoted from London 3 SE (champions)
Beckenham	Balmoral Avenue		Beckenham, London	6th
Charlton Park	Broad Walk	1,500 (300 seats)	Kidbrooke, London	3rd
Deal & Betteshanger	The Drill Field		Deal, Kent	9th
Dover	Crabble Athletic Ground		Dover, Kent	5th
Gravesend	Rectory Field		Gravesend, Kent	Relegated from London 1 South (14th)
Haywards Heath	Whitemans Green		Cuckfield, West Sussex	7th
Heathfield & Waldron	Hardy Roberts Recreational Ground		Cross In Hand, Heathfield, East Sussex	10th
Horsham	Coolhurst Ground		Horsham, West Sussex	5th
Maidstone	William Davey Memorial Ground	2,000 (100 seats)	Maidstone, Kent	Relegated from London 1 South (12th)
Old Colfeians	Lee		Lee, London	Relegated from London 1 South (13th)
Thanet Wanderers	St Peter's Recreation Ground		Broadstairs, Kent	Promoted from London 3 SE (2nd)

Locations of the 2018–19 London 2 South East teams in London
Locations of the 2018–19 London 2 South East teams

== 2017–18 ==
Team	Ground	Capacity	City/Area	Previous season
Barking	Goresbrook	1,000	Becontree, London	Relegated from London 1 North (14th)
Beckenham	Balmoral Avenue		Beckenham, London	5th
Charlton Park	Broad Walk	1,500 (300 seats)	Kidbrooke, London	4th
Dartfordians	Bourne Road		Bexley, London	3rd
Deal & Betteshanger	The Drill Field		Deal, Kent	8th
Dover	Crabble Athletic Ground		Dover, Kent	Relegated from London 1 South (13th)
Haywards Heath	Whitemans Green		Cuckfield, West Sussex	Promoted from London 3 South East (2nd)
Heathfield & Waldron	Hardy Roberts Recreational Ground		Cross In Hand, Heathfield, East Sussex	10th
Horsham	Coolhurst Ground		Horsham, West Sussex	7th
Hove	Hove Recreation Ground		Hove, East Sussex	6th
Old Alleynians	Dulwich Common		Dulwich, London	9th
Pulborough	Freelands		Pulborough, West Sussex	Promoted from London 3 South East (champions)

Locations of the 2017–18 London 2 South East teams
Location of 2017–18 London 2 South East clubs in London

== 2016-17 ==
- Beckenham
- Bromley (promoted from London 3 South East)
- Charlton Park (relegated from London 1 South)
- Crowborough
- Dartfordians
- Deal & Betteshanger
- Heathfield & Waldron (promoted from London 3 South East)
- Horsham
- Hove
- Medway (relegated from London 1 South)
- Old Alleynians
- Old Colfeians

== 2015–16 ==
- Ashford
- Beckenham
- Crowborough
- Dartfordians (promoted from London 3 South East)
- Deal & Betteshanger
- Horsham (promoted from London 3 South East)
- Hove (relegated from London 1 South)
- Old Alleynians (transferred from London 2 South West)
- Old Colfeians
- Sevenoaks
- Thanet Wanderers
- Tunbridge Wells

== 2014–15 ==
- Ashford (promoted from London 3 South East)
- Aylesford Bulls
- Beckenham (relegated from London 1 South)
- Crowborough
- Deal & Betteshanger
- Haywards Heath (relegated from London 1 South) withdrew from league prior to the season, now playing in Sussex 2
- Maidstone
- Medway
- Old Colfeians
- Sevenoaks
- Thanet Wanderers (promoted from London 3 South East)
- Tunbridge Wells

== 2013–14 ==
- Aylesford Bulls
- Charlton Park
- Crowborough
- Deal & Betteshanger
- Heathfield & Waldron
- Lewes
- Maidstone (promoted from London 3 South East)
- Medway
- Old Colfeians (relegated from London 1 South)
- Sevenoaks
- Tunbridge Wells (promoted from London 3 South East)
- Warlingham

== 2012–13 ==
- Aylesford Bulls
- Brighton Football Club
- Crowborough
- Charlton Park
- Deal & Betteshanger
- Heathfield & Waldron
- Lewes
- Medway
- Old Dunstonians
- Sevenoaks
- Thanet Wanderers
- Warlingham

== 2011–12 ==
- Aylesford Bulls
- Brighton Football Club
- Charlton Park
- Deal & Betteshanger
- East Grinstead
- Heathfield & Waldron
- Lewes
- Old Dunstonians
- Old Mid-Whitgiftian
- Sevenoaks
- Tunbridge Wells
- Warlingham

== 2010–11 ==
- Aylesford Bulls
- Brighton Football Club
- Deal & Betteshanger
- East Grinstead
- Lewes
- Maidstone
- Old Dunstonians
- Old Elthamians
- Old Mid-Whitgiftian
- Purley John Fisher
- Sevenoaks
- Warlingham

== 2009–10 ==
- Bromley
- Deal & Betteshanger
- Eastbourne
- Hove
- KCS Old Boys
- Lewes
- Old Dunstonians
- Old Reigatian
- Purley John Fisher
- Sevenoaks
- Tonbridge Juddian
- Warlingham

== Original teams ==
When league rugby began in 1987 this division (known as London 3 South East) contained the following teams:

- Beccehamian
- Beckenham
- Canterbury
- Crawley
- East Grinstead
- Gillingham Anchorians
- Horsham
- Old Colfeians
- Old Dunstonians
- Tunbridge Wells
- Westcombe Park

== London 2 South East honours ==
=== London 3 South East (1987–93) ===
Originally known as London 3 South East, this division was a tier 7 league with promotion to London 2 South and relegation to either Kent 1 or Sussex 1.

London 3 South East
Season	No of teams	Champions	Runners-up	Relegated teams
1987–88	11	Tunbridge Wells	Beckenham	Canterbury, Gillingham Anchorians
1988–89	11	Old Colfeians	Westcombe Park	Old Dunstonians
1989–90	11	Westcombe Park	Old Juddian	East Grinstead
1990–91	11	Old Juddian	Beckenham	Bognor, Park House, Gillingham Anchorians
1991–92	11	Charlton Park	Thanet Wanderers	Hastings & Bexhill
1992–93	13	Horsham	Brighton	Crawley, Dartfordians
Green backgrounds are promotion places.

=== London 3 South East (1993–96) ===
At the end of the 1992–93 season, the top six teams from London 1 and the top six from South West 1 combined to create National 5 South. This meant that London 3 South East dropped from a tier 7 league to a tier 8 league for the years that National 5 South was active. Promotion continued to London 2 South, and relegation to either Kent 1 or Sussex 1.

London 3 South East
Season	No of teams	Champions	Runners–up	Relegated teams
1993–94	13	Gravesend	Beckenham	Hove, Tunbridge Wells, Gillingham Anchorians
1994–95	13	Old Brockleians	Beckenham	Erith, East Grinstead
1995–96	13	Beckenham	Brighton	Heathfield & Waldron, Uckfield
Green backgrounds are promotion places.

=== London 3 South East (1996–2000) ===
The cancellation of National 5 South at the end of the 1995–96 season meant that London 3 South East reverted to being a tier 7 league. Promotion continued to London 2 South and relegation to either Kent 1 or Sussex 1.

London 3 South East
Season	No of teams	Champions	Runners–up	Relegated teams
1996–97	13	Lewes	Sevenoaks (Note: 3rd place Haywards Heath also promoted.)	No relegation (Note: No relegation as league was set to expand from 13 to 17 teams for the following season.)
1997–98	17	Canterbury	Worthing	Bognor
1998–99	16	Maidstone	Brighton	Uckfield
1999–00	17	Brighton	Worthing	Multiple teams (Note: The introduction of London 4 South East for the following season meant that ten clubs were relegated. Horsham and Medway dropped two levels to Sussex 1 and Kent 1 respectively, while Beccehamian, Hove, Park House, Folkestone, Heathfield & Waldron, Dartfordians, Chichester and Eastbourne all went into the new London 4 South East division.)
Green backgrounds are promotion places.

=== London 3 South East (2000–09) ===
London 3 South East continued to be a tier 7 league with promotion up to London 2 South. However, the introduction of London 4 South East ahead of the 2000–01 season meant that clubs were now relegated to this new division instead of Kent 1 or Sussex 1.

London 3 South East
Season	No of teams	Champions	Runners–up	Relegated teams
2000–01	10	Tunbridge Wells	Sidcup	Askean, Cranbrook
2001–02	10	Worthing	Sidcup	Crawley, Old Dunstonians
2002–03	10	Sidcup	Dartfordians	Betteshanger, East Grinstead, Eastbourne
2003–04	10	Dartfordians	Lewes	No relegation (Note: Due to restructure of league from 10 teams to 12 for the following season meant there was no relegation.)
2004–05	12	Maidstone	Sevenoaks	Cobham, Charlton Park
2005–06	12	Tunbridge Wells	Purley John Fisher	Brighton, Dartfordians
2006–07	12	Sidcup	Purley John Fisher	Folkestone, Bognor
2007–08	12	Gravesend	Dover	Tonbridge Juddians, Old Mid-Whitgiftian (Note: The division would be renamed London Division 2 South East for the next season and along with the whole national restructure of the league system by the RFU lead to mass changes at all levels.)
2008–09	12	Old Elthamians	Aylesford Bulls (Note: Both Aylesford Bulls and the runners up from London 2 West, Wimbledon, were promoted to London 2 South this year.)	Lordswood
Green backgrounds are promotion places.

=== London 2 South East (2009–21) ===
Nationwide league restructuring by the RFU ahead of the 2009–10 season saw London 3 South East renamed as London 2 South East. It remained at level 7 with promotion to London 1 South (formerly London 2 South) and relegation to London 3 South East (formerly London 4 South East).

London 2 South East
Season	No of teams	Champions	Runners–up	Relegated teams
2009–10	12	Tonbridge Juddians	Hove	Eastbourne, Bromley
2010–11	12	Old Elthamians	Aylesford Bulls	Maidstone, Purley John Fisher
2011–12	12	East Grinstead	Charlton Park	Old Mid-Whitgiftian, Tunbridge Wells
2012–13	12	Brighton	Charlton Park	Thanet Wanderers, Old Dunstonians
2013–14	12	Charlton Park	Maidstone	Heathfield & Waldron, Lewes, Warlington
2014–15	11	Maidstone	Medway	Aylesford Bulls (Note: Only 1 team relegated this season as the league would go back to 12 teams the following season.)
2015–16	12	Tunbridge Wells	Sevenoaks	Ashford, Thanet Wanderers
2016–17	12	Medway	Old Colfeians	Crowborough, Bromley
2017–18	12	Dartfordians	Hove	Barking, Pulborough
2018–19	12	Beckenham	Horsham	Heathfield & Waldron, Aylesford Bulls
2019–20	12	Haywards Heath	Old Colfeians	Maidstone, Dover
2020–21	12			
Green backgrounds are promotion places.

== Promotion play-offs ==
Since the 2000–01 season there has been a play-off between the runners-up of London 2 South East and London 2 South West for the third and final promotion place to London 1 South. The team with the superior league record had home advantage in the tie. At the end of the 2019–20 season the London 2 South West teams have been the most successful with ten wins to the London 2 South East teams nine, and the home team has won promotion on eleven occasions compared to the away teams eight.

London 2 (south-east v south-west) promotion play-off results
Season	Home team	Score	Away team	Venue	Attendance
2000–01	Gosport & Fareham (SW)	27-14	Sidcup (SE)	Gosport Park, Gosport, Hampshire	
2001–02	Sidcup (SE)	21-23	Cobham (SW)	Crescent Farm, Sidcup, Kent	
2002–03	Barnes (SW)	41-3	Dartfordians (SE)	Barn Elms, Barnes, London	
2003–04	Old Wimbledonians (SW)	3-24	Lewes (SE)	Somerset Avenue, Wimbledon, London	
2004–05	Sevenoaks (SE)	33-12	Effingham & Leatherhead (SW)	Knole Paddock, Sevenoaks, Kent	
2005–06	Purley John Fisher (SE)	15-23	London Irish Wild Geese (SW)	Parsons Pightle, Old Coulsdon, Greater London	
2006–07	Dorking (SW)	21-6	Purley John Fisher (SE)	The Big Field, Brockham, Surrey	
2007–08	Purley John Fisher (SW)	19-25	Dover (SE)	Parsons Pightle, Old Coulsdon, Greater London	400
2008–09	Aylesford Bulls (SE) (Note: Despite losing the playoff, Aylesford Bulls would join Wimbledon in London 1 South the following season.)	20-36	Wimbledon (SW)	Hall Road, Aylesford, Kent	
2009–10	Hove (SE)	17-14	Guernsey (SW)	Hove Recreation Ground, Hove, East Sussex	
2010–11	Aylesford Bulls (SE)	14-28	Trojans (SW)	Hall Road, Aylesford, Kent	
2011–12	Wimbledon (SW)	18-6	Charlton Park (SE)	Somerset Avenue, Wimbledon, London	
2012–13	Charlton Park (SE)	12-15	Sutton & Epsom (SW)	Broad Walk, Kidbrooke, Greater London	
2013–14	Gosport & Fareham (SW)	14-10	Maidstone (SE)	Gosport Park, Gosport, Hampshire	
2014–15	Medway (SE)	29-12	London Cornish (SW)	Priestfields, Rochester, Kent	600
2015–16	Sevenoaks (SE)	37-31	London Cornish (SW)	Knole Paddock, Sevenoaks, Kent	234
2016–17	Camberley (SW)	17-20	Old Colfeians (SE)	Watchetts Recreation Ground, Camberley, Surrey	
2017–18	Hove (SE)	17-16	Old Reigatian (SW)	Hove Recreation Ground, Hove, East Sussex	
2018–19	Horsham (SE)	44-17	Farnham (SW)	Coolhurst Ground, Horsham, West Sussex	600
2019–20	Cancelled due to COVID-19 pandemic in the United Kingdom. Best ranked runner-up – Farnham (SW) – promoted instead.				
2021–22	Cancelled due to league reorganisation.				
Green background is the promoted team. SE = London 2 South East (formerly London 3 South East) and SW = London 2 South West (formerly London 3 South West)

== Number of league titles ==
- Tunbridge Wells (4)
- Maidstone (3)
- Beckenham (2)
- Brighton (2)
- Charlton Park (2)
- Dartfordians (2)
- Gravesend (2)
- Old Elthamians (2)
- Tonbridge Juddians (2) (Note: One of Tonbridge Juddians titles was won by founder club Old Juddian.)
- Canterbury (1)
- East Grinstead (1)
- Haywards Heath (1)
- Horsham (1)
- Lewes (1)
- Medway (1)
- Old Brockleians (1)
- Old Colfeians (1)
- Sidcup (1)
- Westcombe Park (1)
- Worthing (1)

== See also ==
- London & SE Division RFU
- Kent RFU
- Sussex RFU
- English rugby union system
- Rugby union in England
