= Counties 1 Surrey/Sussex =

English Rugby Union Regional League

- Current season or competition: 2025–26 Counties 1 Surrey/Sussex
- Sport: Rugby union
- Number of teams: 11
- Country: England
- Holders: Twickenham (2024–25)

Counties 1 Surrey/Sussex is an English level 7 rugby union regional league for rugby clubs in London and the south-east of England including sides from Surrey, Greater London (in locations that were historically part of Surrey), East Sussex and West Sussex. Administration of the leagues is divided between Surrey Rugby, Sussex Rugby and the London & SE RFU. The current champions are Twickenham.

== Structure and format ==
The twelve teams play home and away matches from September through to April, making a total of twenty-two matches each. The results of the matches contribute points to the league as follows:

- 4 points are awarded for a win.
- 2 points are awarded for a draw.
- 0 points are awarded for a loss.

In addition:

- 1 losing (bonus) point is awarded to a team that loses a match by 7 points or fewer
- 1 additional (bonus) point is awarded to a team scoring 4 tries or more in a match

Promotion is either Regional 2 South East, Regional 2 South Central or Regional 2 Thames whilst relegated teams drop to either Counties 2 Surrey or Counties 2 Sussex depending on location.

== 2026–27 ==
Departing were champions Cobham promoted to Regional 2 South East and runners-up Weybridge Vandals promoted to Regional 2 South Central, whilst KCS Old Boys (11th) were relegated to Counties 2 Surrey.

With four teams joining the league was restored to twelve clubs.

| Team | Ground | Capacity | City/Area | Previous season |
|---|---|---|---|---|
| Bec Old Boys | Ashcroft Technology Academy | | Earlsfield, London | Promoted from Counties 2 Surrey (runners-up) |
| Eastbourne | Park Avenue | | Eastbourne, East Sussex | 5th |
| Haywards Heath | Whitemans Green | | Cuckfield, West Sussex | 8th |
| Hove | Hove Recreation Ground | | Hove, East Sussex | 4th |
| London Cornish | Richardson Evans Memorial Playing Fields | | Roehampton Vale, London | 6th |
| Old Caterhamians | Caterham School | | Caterham, Surrey | 9th |
| Old Hamptonians | Dean Road | | Hampton, London | Promoted from Counties 2 Surrey (champions) |
| Old Reigatian | Geoffrey Knight Fields | | Reigate, Surrey | Relegated from Regional 2 South East (12th) |
| Old Rutlishians | Old Rutlishians' Sports Ground | | Merton Park, London | 7th |
| Old Wimbledonians | Old Wimbledonians & Donhead Sports Ground | | Raynes Park, London | 10th |
| Reeds Weybridge | Whiteley Village | | Hersham, Surrey | Relegated from Regional 2 South Central (12th) |
| Trinity | Trinity Sanderstead Sports & Social Club | | Sanderstead, London | 3rd |

Locations of the 2026–27 Counties 1 Surrey/Sussex teams in Greater London
Locations of the 2026–27 Counties 1 Surrey/Sussex teams in Surrey, East Sussex & West Sussex

== 2025–26 ==
=== Participating teams and locations ===
Departing were Twickenham, promoted to Regional 2 South Central, whilst East Grinstead (11th) and Old Haileyburians (12th) were relegated to Counties 2 Sussex and Counties 2 Surrey respectively.

A month ahead of the new season began Uckfield, who had been promoted as champions of Counties 2 Sussex, withdrew from the competition having lost their head coach and a significant number of senior players to league rivals Hove.

| Team | Ground | Capacity | City/Area | Previous season |
|---|---|---|---|---|
| Cobham | Old Surbitonians Memorial Ground | | Cobham, Surrey | 4th |
| Eastbourne | Park Avenue | | Eastbourne, East Sussex | 6th |
| Haywards Heath | Whitemans Green | | Cuckfield, West Sussex | 10th |
| Hove | Hove Recreation Ground | | Hove, East Sussex | 9th |
| KCS Old Boys | Dornan Fields | | Motspur Park, London | 8th |
| London Cornish | Richardson Evans Memorial Playing Fields | | Roehampton Vale, London | 7th |
| Old Caterhamians | Caterham School | | Caterham, Surrey | Promoted from Counties 2 Surrey (champions) |
| Old Rutlishians | Old Rutlishians' Sports Ground | | Merton Park, London | 2nd |
| Old Wimbledonians | Old Wimbledonians & Donhead Sports Ground | | Raynes Park, London | Promoted from Counties 2 Surrey (runners-up) |
| Trinity | Trinity Sanderstead Sports & Social Club | | Sanderstead, London | 5th |
| Weybridge Vandals | Brownacres | | Walton-on-Thames, Surrey | 3rd |

Locations of the 2025–26 Counties 1 Surrey/Sussex teams in Greater London
Locations of the 2025–26 Counties 1 Surrey/Sussex teams in Surrey, East Sussex & West Sussex

== 2024–25 ==
=== Participating teams and locations ===
Leaving the league were Teddington and Old Tiffinians, promoted to Regional 2 Thames and Regional 2 South East respectively; while Kingston, Old Walcountians and Old Cranleighans were relegated to Counties 2 Surrey. Joining were Cobham and London Cornish both relegated from Regional 2 South East; coming up were Haywards Heath from Counties 2 Sussex and Old Haileyburians and Old Rutlishians both from Counties 2 Surrey.

The London & SE RFU published fixtures for the league in June 2024.

| Team | Ground | City/Area | Previous season |
|---|---|---|---|
| Cobham | Old Surbitonians Memorial Ground | Cobham, Surrey | Relegated from Regional 2SE (11th) |
| East Grinstead | Saint Hill | East Grinstead, West Sussex | 8th |
| Eastbourne | Park Avenue | Eastbourne, East Sussex | 6th |
| Haywards Heath | Whitemans Green | Cuckfield, West Sussex | Promoted from Counties 2 Sussex (1st) |
| Hove | Hove Recreation Ground | Hove, East Sussex | 7th |
| KCS Old Boys | Dornan Fields | Motspur Park, London | 5th |
| London Cornish | Richardson Evans Memorial Playing Fields | Roehampton Vale, London | Relegated from Regional 2SE (12th) |
| Old Haileyburians | Ruxley Lane | Epsom, Surrey | Promoted from Counties 2 Surrey (2nd) |
| Old Rutlishians | Old Rutlishians' Sports Ground | Merton Park, London | Promoted from Counties 2 Surrey (1st) |
| Trinity | Trinity Sanderstead Sports & Social Club | Sanderstead, London | 9th |
| Twickenham | Parkfields | Hampton, London | 4th |
| Weybridge Vandals | Brownacres | Walton-on-Thames, Surrey | 3rd |

Locations of the 2024–25 Counties 1 Surrey/Sussex teams in Greater London
Locations of the 2024–25 Counties 1 Surrey/Sussex teams in Surrey, East Sussex & West Sussex

=== League table ===
Counties 1 Surrey/Sussex 2024–25
| | Team | Played | Won | Drawn | Lost | Points for | Points against | Points diff | Try bonus | Loss bonus | Points |
| 1 | Twickenham (P) | 22 | 18 | 1 | 3 | 752 | 377 | 375 | 14 | 3 | 91 |
| 2 | Old Rutlishians | 22 | 17 | 0 | 5 | 811 | 466 | 345 | 15 | 4 | 87 |
| 3 | Weybridge Vandals | 22 | 16 | 1 | 5 | 849 | 364 | 485 | 17 | 3 | 86 |
| 4 | Cobham | 22 | 14 | 1 | 7 | 870 | 494 | 376 | 17 | 5 | 80 |
| 5 | Trinity | 22 | 15 | 0 | 7 | 538 | 574 | −36 | 10 | 0 | 70 |
| 6 | Eastbourne | 22 | 11 | 2 | 9 | 736 | 556 | 180 | 13 | 5 | 66 |
| 7 | London Cornish | 22 | 9 | 1 | 12 | 593 | 574 | 19 | 9 | 6 | 53 |
| 8 | KCS Old Boys RFC | 22 | 8 | 0 | 14 | 543 | 808 | −265 | 13 | 3 | 48 |
| 9 | Hove | 22 | 9 | 1 | 12 | 428 | 757 | −329 | 6 | 1 | 45 |
| 10 | Haywards Heath | 22 | 5 | 0 | 17 | 406 | 817 | −411 | 8 | 6 | 34 |
| 11 | East Grinstead (R) | 22 | 3 | 1 | 18 | 380 | 717 | −337 | 4 | 7 | 25 |
| 12 | Old Haileyburians (R) | 22 | 3 | 0 | 19 | 389 | 791 | −402 | 5 | 5 | 22 |
If teams are level at any stage, tiebreakers are applied in the following order: 1. Number of matches won 2. Number of draws 3. Difference between points for and against 4. Total number of points for 5. Aggregate number of points scored in matches between tied teams 6. Number of matches won excluding the first match, then the second and so on until the tie is settled
Green background is the promotion place. Pink background are the relegation place.s Source:

== 2023–24 ==
=== Participating teams and locations ===
Leaving the league were Chobham promoted to Regional 2 Thames. Warlingham were relegated to Counties 2 Surrey for what were reported as "...administrative, rather than playing, reasons...". Joining the league were promoted sides Teddington, from Counties 2 Surrey, Eastbourne and East Grinstead, both from Counties 2 Sussex. Coming down from Regional 2 South East were KCS Old Boys. Further post-ACR adjustments meant the league was restored to twelve teams.

| Team | Ground | Capacity | City/Area | Previous season |
|---|---|---|---|---|
| Eastbourne | Park Avenue | | Eastbourne, East Sussex | Promoted from Counties 2 Sussex (1st) |
| East Grinstead | Saint Hill | | East Grinstead, West Sussex | Promoted from Counties 2 Sussex (2nd) |
| Hove | Hove Recreation Ground | | Hove, East Sussex | 3rd |
| KCS Old Boys | Dornan Fields | | Motspur Park, London | Relegated from Regional 2SE (12th) |
| Kingston | Hook Road | | Chessington, London | 6th |
| Old Cranleighans | Old Cranleighan Sports Club | | Thames Ditton, Surrey | 9th |
| Old Tiffinians | Grist's Memorial Ground | | Thames Ditton, Surrey | 2nd |
| Old Walcountians | Clockhouse Ground | | Woodmansterne, Surrey | 7th |
| Teddington | Udney Park Sports Ground | | Teddington, London | Promoted from Counties 2 Surrey (1st) |
| Trinity | Trinity Sanderstead Sports & Social Club | | Sanderstead, London | 8th |
| Twickenham | Parkfields | | Hampton, London | 4th |
| Weybridge Vandals | Brownacres | | Walton-on-Thames, Surrey | 5th |

Locations of the 2023–24 Counties 1 Surrey/Sussex teams in Greater London
Locations of the 2023–24 Counties 1 Surrey/Sussex teams in Surrey & East Sussex

=== League table ===
Counties 1 Surrey/Sussex 2023–24
| | Team | Played | Won | Drawn | Lost | Points for | Points against | Points diff | Try bonus | Loss bonus | Points | Adjust |
| 1 | Teddington (P) | 22 | 21 | 0 | 1 | 1024 | 313 | 711 | 21 | 1 | 107 | +1 |
| 2 | Old Tiffinians (P) | 22 | 17 | 0 | 5 | 812 | 495 | 317 | 20 | 5 | 94 | +1 |
| 3 | Weybridge Vandals | 22 | 16 | 0 | 6 | 765 | 428 | 337 | 15 | 1 | 82 | +2 |
| 4 | Twickenham | 22 | 16 | 0 | 6 | 852 | 444 | 408 | 15 | 1 | 81 | +1 |
| 5 | KCS Old Boys RFC | 22 | 16 | 0 | 6 | 601 | 499 | 102 | 14 | 1 | 80 | +1 |
| 6 | Eastbourne | 22 | 10 | 1 | 11 | 542 | 662 | −120 | 11 | 2 | 57 | +2 |
| 7 | Hove | 22 | 10 | 0 | 12 | 609 | 583 | 26 | 14 | 3 | 57 | |
| 8 | East Grinstead | 22 | 9 | 0 | 13 | 435 | 577 | −142 | 6 | 4 | 48 | |
| 9 | Trinity | 22 | 8 | 0 | 14 | 424 | 786 | −362 | 8 | 2 | 42 | |
| 10 | Old Walcountians (R) | 22 | 6 | 0 | 16 | 373 | 786 | −413 | 7 | 3 | 34 | |
| 11 | Kingston (R) | 22 | 2 | 1 | 19 | 339 | 875 | −536 | 4 | 1 | 10 | −5 |
| 12 | Old Cranleighans (R) | 22 | 0 | 0 | 22 | 194 | 522 | −328 | 3 | 4 | −28 | −35 |
If teams are level at any stage, tiebreakers are applied in the following order: 1. Number of matches won 2. Number of draws 3. Difference between points for and against 4. Total number of points for 5. Aggregate number of points scored in matches between tied teams 6. Number of matches won excluding the first match, then the second and so on until the tie is settled
Green background are the promotion places. Pink background are the relegation place.s Source:

== 2022–23 ==
=== Participating teams and locations ===
This was the first season following the RFU Adult Competition Review. The league was similar to London 2 South West but was smaller (12 teams reduced to 10) with Counties 1 Hampshire taking teams that historically would have played in London 2 South West. This prompted a substantial reordering of the leagues with two teams, Kingston and Trinity, effectively achieving a 'double' promotion from level 9 (Surrey 1) to level 7 of the RFU rugby pyramid. Warlingham, Weybridge Vandals and Old Walcountians were all promoted from the upper end of London 3 South West whilst, rather less predictably, Old Cranleighans also came up from the same league despite having finished in last place.

| Team | Ground | Capacity | City/Area | Previous season |
|---|---|---|---|---|
| Chobham | Fowlers Well | | Chobham, Surrey | L2SW (5th) |
| Hove | Hove Recreation Ground | | Hove, East Sussex | L2SW (9th) |
| Kingston | Hook Road | | Chessington, London | Promoted from (Surrey 1) (champions) |
| Old Cranleighans | Old Cranleighan Sports Club | | Thames Ditton, Surrey | Promoted from (L3SW) (12th) |
| Old Tiffinians | Grist's Memorial Ground | | Thames Ditton, Surrey | L2SW (6th) |
| Old Walcountians | Clockhouse Ground | | Woodmansterne, Surrey | Promoted from (L3SW) (4th) |
| Trinity | Trinity Sanderstead Sports & Social Club | | Sanderstead, London | Promoted from (Surrey 1) (2nd) |
| Twickenham | Parkfields | | Hampton, London | L2SW (10th) |
| Warlingham | Limpsfield Road | | Warlingham, Surrey | Promoted from (L3SW) (champions) |
| Weybridge Vandals | Brownacres | | Walton-on-Thames, Surrey | Promoted from (L3SW) (3rd) |

Locations of the 2022–23 Counties 1 Surrey/Sussex teams in Greater London
Locations of the 2022–23 Counties 1 Surrey/Sussex teams in Surrey & East Sussex

=== League table ===
Counties 1 Surrey/Sussex 2022–23
| | Team | Played | Won | Drawn | Lost | Points for | Points against | Points diff | Try bonus | Loss bonus | Points | Adjust |
| 1 | Chobham (P) | 18 | 16 | 0 | 2 | 668 | 283 | 385 | 13 | 1 | 79 | +1 |
| 2 | Old Tiffinians | 18 | 15 | 0 | 3 | 540 | 306 | 234 | 9 | 2 | 72 | +1 |
| 3 | Hove | 18 | 13 | 0 | 5 | 513 | 263 | 250 | 11 | 2 | 66 | +1 |
| 4 | Twickenham | 18 | 13 | 1 | 4 | 560 | 361 | 199 | 9 | 1 | 65 | +1 |
| 5 | Weybridge Vandals | 18 | 11 | 1 | 6 | 563 | 319 | 244 | 9 | 2 | 58 | +1 |
| 6 | Kingston | 18 | 6 | 0 | 12 | 323 | 615 | −292 | 6 | 1 | 32 | +1 |
| 7 | Old Walcountians | 18 | 6 | 0 | 12 | 360 | 504 | −144 | 6 | 1 | 31 | |
| 8 | Trinity | 18 | 4 | 0 | 14 | 343 | 584 | −241 | 4 | 4 | 24 | |
| 9 | Old Cranleighans | 18 | 4 | 0 | 14 | 274 | 403 | −129 | 5 | 3 | 4 | −20 |
| 10 | Warlingham (R) | 18 | 1 | 0 | 17 | 213 | 719 | −506 | 1 | 1 | −4 | −10 |
If teams are level at any stage, tiebreakers are applied in the following order: 1. Number of matches won 2. Number of draws 3. Difference between points for and against 4. Total number of points for 5. Aggregate number of points scored in matches between tied teams 6. Number of matches won excluding the first match, then the second and so on until the tie is settled
Green background is the promotion place. Pink background is the relegation place. Source:

== Counties 1 Surrey/Sussex honours (2022–present) ==
Following the RFU Adult Competition Review, the league was initially made up of ten clubs from East Sussex, south-west London, Surrey and West Sussex. Promotion is either Regional 2 South East, Regional 2 South Central or Regional 2 Thames while relegated teams drop to either Counties 2 Surrey or Counties 2 Sussex depending on location.

Counties 1 Surrey/Sussex
| Season | No of teams | Champions | Runner-up | Relegated team(s) | Ref |
| 2022–23 | 10 | Chobham | Old Tiffinians | Warlingham (10th) | |
| 2023–24 | 12 | Teddington | Old Tiffinians | Old Walcountians (10th), Kingston (11th) and Old Cranleighhans (12th) | |
| 2024–25 | 12 | Twickenham | Old Rutlishians | East Grinstead (11th) and Old Haileyburians (12th) | |
Green backgrounds are the promotion places.

== Summary of champions and runners-up ==
| Team | Champions | Year(s) | Runner-up | Year(s) |
|---|---|---|---|---|
| Chobham | 1 | 2023 | | |
| Teddington | 1 | 2024 | | |
| Twickenham | 1 | 2025 | | |
| Old Tiffinians | | | 2 | 2023, 2024 |
| Old Rutlishians | | | 1 | 2025 |
Green years are the promotion places.

== See also ==
- English rugby union system
- London & SE Division RFU
- Surrey RFU
- Sussex RFU
- Rugby union in England
