= Sussex 1 =

English level 9 Rugby Union League

- Current season or competition: 2019–20 Sussex 1
- Sport: Rugby union
- Instituted: 1987; 39 years ago
- Number of teams: 9
- Country: England
- Holders: East Grinstead Rugby Football Club (2021–22) ())
- Most titles: Uckfield RFC (5 titles)
- Website: englandrugby.com

Sussex 1 (known as Harvey's of Sussex 1 due to sponsorship reasons) is an English level 9 Rugby Union League. It is made up of teams predominantly from Sussex. Teams play home and away matches from September through to April. The league champions are automatically promoted up to London 3 South East, while the second placed team plays a promotion playoff against the second placed team from Kent 1. Relegated teams drop to Sussex 2 although in recent season there has been no relegation. Only 1st XV sides can be promoted into London 3 South East.

The system from 2017 to 2018 sees the eight team league play home and away games against each team in the league (14 games each) up until February when the league splits into two mini leagues of 4 teams (Sussex 1A and Sussex 1B) based on league ranking. Each team then a further 6 games against teams in their group (home and away) with the teams in the promotion group (1A) playing off for the title, and the teams in the relegation group (1B) playing to avoid the drop. Note that points from the first stage are carried into the second.

Each year some of the clubs in this division also take part in the RFU Junior Vase - a level 9-12 national competition.

== Teams for 2021-22 ==
The teams competing in 2021-22 achieved their places in the league based on performances in 2019–20, the 'previous season' column in the table below refers to that season not 2020–21.

Barns Green finished 9th in 2019-20 and whilst not relegated, did not return for 2021-22 and instead have dropped to Sussex 2 West.

Team	Ground	Capacity	City/Area	Previous season
Burgess Hill	Southway Recreation Ground		Burgess Hill, West Sussex	4th
East Grinstead	Saint Hill		East Grinstead, West Sussex	2nd
Eastbourne	Park Avenue		Eastbourne, East Sussex	3rd
Hellingly	Horsebridge Recreation Ground		Hellingly, East Sussex	5th
Hove II	Hove Recreation Ground		Hove, East Sussex	8th
Lewes	Stanley Turner Ground		Lewes, East Sussex	7th
Seaford	Salts Recreation Ground		Seaford, East Sussex	6th
Uckfield	Hempstead Playing Fields		Uckfield, East Sussex	Relegated from London 3 South East (10th)

Locations of the 2021-22 Sussex 1 teams in East & West Sussex

== Season 2020–21 ==
On 30 October 2020 the RFU announced that due to the coronavirus pandemic a decision had been taken to cancel Adult Competitive Leagues (National League 1 and below) for the 2020/21 season meaning Sussex 1 was not contested.

== Teams for 2019-20 ==
Team	Ground	Capacity	City/Area	Previous season
Barns Green	Barns Green Sports & Social Club		Barns Green, West Sussex	Promoted from Sussex 2 (runners up)
Burgess Hill	Southway Recreation Ground		Burgess Hill, West Sussex	4th
Crawley	Willoughby Fields		Crawley, West Sussex	Runners up (lost playoff)
East Grinstead	Saint Hill		East Grinstead, West Sussex	5th
Eastbourne	Park Avenue		Eastbourne, East Sussex	3rd
Hellingly	Horsebridge Recreation Ground		Hellingly, East Sussex	N/A
Hove II	Hove Recreation Ground		Hove, East Sussex	N/A
Lewes	Stanley Turner Ground		Lewes, East Sussex	Relegated from London 3 South East (11th)
Seaford	Salts Recreation Ground		Seaford, East Sussex	7th

Locations of the 2019-20 Sussex 1 teams in West Sussex
Locations of the 2019-20 Sussex 1 teams in East Sussex

== Teams for 2018-19 ==
Team	Ground	Capacity	City/Area	Previous season
Burgess Hill	Southway Recreation Ground		Burgess Hill, West Sussex	4th
Crawley	Willoughby Fields		Crawley, West Sussex	Relegated from London 3 SE (12th)
Ditchling	Ditchling Recreation Ground		Ditchling, East Sussex	7th
East Grinstead	Saint Hill		East Grinstead, West Sussex	3rd
Eastbourne	Park Avenue		Eastbourne, East Sussex	6th
Plumpton	Plumpton Racecourse		Plumpton, East Sussex	Promoted from Sussex 2 (champions)
Seaford	Salts Recreation Ground		Seaford, East Sussex	5th
Uckfield	Hempstead Playing Fields		Uckfield, East Sussex	Runners up (lost playoff)

Locations of the 2018-19 Sussex 1 teams in West Sussex
Locations of the 2018-19 Sussex 1 teams in East Sussex

== Teams for 2017-18 ==
Team	Ground	Capacity	City/Area	Previous season
Barns Green	Barns Green Sports & Social Club		Barns Green, West Sussex	Promoted from Sussex 2 (4th)
Burgess Hill	Southway Recreation Ground		Burgess Hill, West Sussex	3rd
Ditchling	Ditchling Recreation Ground		Ditchling, East Sussex	Promoted from Sussex 2 (runners up)
East Grinstead	Saint Hill		East Grinstead, West Sussex	Promoted from Sussex 2 (champions)
Eastbourne	Park Avenue		Eastbourne, East Sussex	Relegated from London 3 South East (11th)
Hellingly	Horsebridge Recreation Ground		Hellingly, East Sussex	4th
Seaford	Salts Recreation Ground		Seaford, East Sussex	5th
Uckfield	Hempstead Playing Fields		Uckfield, East Sussex	2nd (lost play-off)

Locations of the 2017-18 Sussex 1 teams in West Sussex
Locations of the 2017-18 Sussex 1 teams in East Sussex

== Teams for 2016-17 ==
- Bognor 2nd XV (promoted from Sussex Canterbury Jack Division 2)
- Brighton II
- Burgess Hill (relegated from London 3 South East)
- Crawley
- Hellingly
- Horsham II
- Hove 2nd XV
- Seaford
- Shoreham (promoted from Sussex Canterbury Jack Division 2)
- Uckfield (relegated from London 3 South East)

== Teams for 2015-16 ==
- Brighton II
- Chichester III
- Crowborough II
- Crawley
- Haywards Heath
- Hellingly
- Horsham II
- Hove 2nd XV
- Lewes (relegated from London 3 South East)
- Midhurst
- Seaford
- Worthing Senior I

== Teams for 2014-15 ==
- Brighton II
- Burgess Hill (relegated from London 3 South East)
- Chichester III
- Crowborough II
- Crawley
- Eastbourne
- Hellingly
- Holbrook
- Hove 2nd XV
- Rye
- Seaford
- Worthing Senior I

== Teams for 2012-13 ==
- Brighton II
- Burgess Hill
- Chichester III
- Eastbourne
- Holbrook
- Haywards Heath II
- Hove III
- Lewes II
- Midhurst
- Newick
- Rye
- Seaford

== Original teams ==
When league rugby began in 1987 this division contained the following teams:

- Bognor
- Brighton
- Burgess Hill
- Chichester
- Crowborough
- Eastbourne
- Hastings & Bexhill
- Haywards Heath
- Hove
- Sussex Police

== Sussex 1 honours ==
=== Sussex 1 (1987–1993) ===
The original Sussex 1 was a tier 8 league with promotion up to London 3 South East and relegation down to Sussex 2.

Sussex 1
Season	No of Teams	Champions	Runners–up	Relegated Teams
1987–88	11	Bognor	Chichester	Hastings & Bexhill
1988–89	11	Hove	Chichester	Hellingly
1989–90	11	Chichester	Haywards Heath	Crowborough, St. Francis
1990–91	11	Hastings & Bexhill	East Grinstead	Sussex Police, Seaford
1991–92	11	Brighton	East Grinstead	No relegation (Note: Restructuring of the Sussex leagues caused by the cancellation of Sussex 3 for the following season, meant that there was no relegation.)
1992–93	12	Haywards Heath	Hastings & Bexhill	St. Francis, Hellingly
Green backgrounds are promotion places.

=== Sussex 1 (1993–1996) ===
The creation of National 5 South meant that Sussex 1 dropped from a tier 9 league to a tier 10 league for the years that National 5 South was active. Promotion and relegation continued to London 3 South East and Sussex 2 respectively.

Sussex 1
Season	No of Teams	Champions	Runners–up	Relegated Teams
1993–94	12	Heathfield & Waldron	Uckfield	BA Wingspan
1994–95	13	Uckfield	Seaford	Ditchling, Crowborough
1995–96	13	Bognor	Crawley	Sun Alliance, Hellingly, BA Wingspan
Green backgrounds are promotion places.

=== Sussex 1 (1996–2000) ===
The cancellation of National 5 South at the end of the 1995–96 season meant that Sussex 1 reverted to being a tier 8 league. Promotion and relegation continued to London 3 South East and Sussex 2 respectively.

Sussex 1
Season	No of Teams	Champions	Runners–up	Relegated Teams
1996–97	13	Heathfield & Waldron	Uckfield (Note: 3rd and 4th place East Grinstead and Crawley were also promoted.)	Burgess Hill
1997–98	9	Eastbourne	Hove	Pulborough, BA Wingspan
1998–99	9	Hove	Crowborough	Burgess Hill, Ditchling, Old Brightonian
1999–00	8	Bognor	Crowborough	No relegation (Note: No relegation as Sussex 3 would be abolished at the end of the season leading to the Sussex league being restructured and Sussex 1 increasing from 8 to 10 teams.)
Green backgrounds are promotion places.

=== Sussex 1 (2000–2009) ===
The introduction of London 4 South East ahead of the 2000–01 season meant Sussex 1 dropped to become a tier 9 league with promotion to this new division. Relegation continued to Sussex 2 (briefly two regional divisions) until that league was abolished at the end of the 2003–04 season.

Sussex 1
Season	No of Teams	Champions	Runners–up	Relegated Teams
2000–01	10	Uckfield	Hastings & Bexhill	Holbrook, Newick, Seaford
2001–02	10	Chichester	Heathfield & Waldron	St. Francis, Sussex Police
2002–03	9	Uckfield	Hastings & Bexhill	Chichester IHE, Hellingly
2003–04	10	Hove	Hastings & Bexhill	Rye, Norfolk Arms
2004–05	8	Horsham	Hastings & Bexhill	No relegation (Note: No relegation as Sussex 2 and Sussex 3 would be abolished at the end of the season. Sussex 2 and 3's equivalents would reappearing in 2010-11 as Sussex Canterbury Jack Intermediate and the Asahi 2 East/Oranjeboom 2 West respectively.)
2005–06	9	Crowborough	Hastings & Bexhill	Hellingly (Note: Hellingly drop out of league by season's end.)
2006–07	10	Hastings & Bexhill	Horsham	Plumpton (Note: Plumpton drop out of league by season's end.)
2007–08	9	Heathfield & Waldron	East Grinstead	Burgess Hill, Hellingly (Note: Burgess Hill and Hellingly drop out of league by season's end.)
2008–09	11	Brighton	Uckfield	No relegation
Green backgrounds are promotion places.

=== Sussex 1 (2009–present) ===
Sussex 1 remained a tier 9 league despite national restructuring by the RFU. Promotion was to London 3 South East (formerly London 4 South East) and relegation was to Sussex Canterbury Jack Intermediate (Sussex 2) which was reintroduced for the 2010–11 season after an absence of six years.

Sussex 1
Season	No of Teams	Champions	Runners–up	Relegated Teams
2009–10	12	Crawley	Uckfield	Lewes II
2010–11	12	Uckfield	Burgess Hill	St. Francis, Worthing III
2011–12	10	Pulborough	East Grinstead II, Burgess Hill (3rd) (Note: Despite finishing 2nd East Grinstead II were not able to take part in the 2011-12 promotion playoff due to the East Grinstead first team being in the division above. This meant that 3rd placed Burgess Hill went into the playoff game instead.)	Eastbourne II (Note: Despite finishing 2nd Eastbourne II were relegated as the Eastbourne first team would drop down to division.)
2012–13	12	Burgess Hill	Eastbourne	Midhurst, Newick
2013–14	12	Pulborough	Crawley	Lewes II, Haywards Heath II
2014–15	12	Eastbourne	Burgess Hill	Holbrook, Rye
2015–16	12	Lewes	Haywards Heath	Crowborough II, Midhurst
2016–17	10 (Note: A number of teams (mostly 2nd teams) would withdraw prior to the 2016-17 season.)	Crawley	Uckfield	Horsham II, Brighton II
2017–18	8	Hellingly	Uckfield	Barns Green
2018–19	8	Uckfield	Crawley	No relegation
2019–20	9	Crawley	East Grinstead	No relegation
2020–21				
2021–22	8	East Grinstead	Uckfield	
Green backgrounds are promotion places.

== Promotion play-offs ==
Since the 2000–01 season there has been a play-off between the runners-up of Kent 1 and Sussex 1 for the third and final promotion place to London 3 South East. The team with the superior league record has home advantage in the tie. At the end of the 2019–20 season the Kent 1 teams have been the most successful with fourteen wins to the Sussex 1 teams five; and the home team has won promotion on eleven occasions compared to the away teams eight.

Kent 1 v Sussex 1 promotion play-off results
Season	Home team	Score	Away team	Venue	Attendance
2000–01	Hastings & Bexhill (S)	12-29	Betteshanger (K)	William Parker Lower School, Hastings, East Sussex	
2001–02	Heathfield & Waldron (S)	25-12	Whitstable (K)	Hardy Roberts Recreational Ground, Cross In Hand, Heathfield, East Sussex	
2002–03	Ashford (K)	10-0	Hastings & Bexhill (S)	Canterbury Road, Ashford, Kent	
2003–04	Hastings & Bexhill (S)	13-21	Old Elthamians (K)	William Parker Lower School, Hastings, East Sussex	
2004–05	Hastings & Bexhill (S)	0-22	Sittingbourne (K)	William Parker Lower School, Hastings, East Sussex	
2005–06	Hastings & Bexhill (S)	17-18	Ashford (K)	William Parker Lower School, Hastings, East Sussex	
2006–07	Horsham (S)	33-7	Park House (K)	Coolhurst Ground, Horsham, West Sussex	
2007–08	Old Gravesendians (K)	8-14	East Grinstead (S)	Fleetway Sports Ground, Gravesend, Kent	
2008–09	Old Gravesendians (K)	10-5	Uckfield (S)	Fleetway Sports Ground, Gravesend, Kent	300
2009–10	Uckfield (S)	19-21	Cranbrook (K)	Hempstead Playing Fields, Uckfield, East Sussex	
2010–11	Sheppey (K)	42-10	Burgess Hill (S)	Stupple Field, Minster, Kent	500
2011–12	Vigo (K)	10-7	Burgess Hill (S) (Note: Despite finishing 3rd in the league Burgess Hill took 2nd placed East Grinstead II place in the 2011-12 promotion playoff as East Grinstead's first team were in the division above.)	Swanswood Field, Meopham, Kent	400
2012–13	Eastbourne (S)	0-47	Beccehamian (K)	Park Avenue, Eastbourne, East Sussex	
2013–14	Crawley (S)	22-41	Hastings & Bexhill (K)	Willoughby Fields Pavilion, Crawley, West Sussex	
2014–15	Burgess Hill (S)	26-23	Sheppey (K)	Southway Recreation Ground, Burgess Hill, West Sussex	
2015–16	Haywards Heath (S)	13-8	Old Williamsonians (K)	Whitemans Green, Cuckfield, West Sussex	
2016–17	Old Williamsonians (K)	20-17	Uckfield (S)	Sir Joseph Williamson's Mathematical School, Rochester, Kent	
2017–18	Vigo (K)	31-17	Uckfield (S)	Swanswood Field, Meopham, Kent	
2018–19	Gillingham Anchorians (K)	23-21	Crawley (S)	Darland Banks, Gillingham, Kent	
2019–20	Cancelled due to COVID-19 pandemic in the United Kingdom. Best ranked runner up - Cranbrook (K) - promoted instead.				
2020–21					
Green background is the promoted team. K = Shepherd Neame Kent 1 and S = Sussex 1

== Number of league titles ==
- Uckfield (5)
- Bognor (3)
- Crawley (3)
- Heathfield & Waldron (3)
- Hove (3)
- Brighton (2)
- Chichester (2)
- Eastbourne (2)
- Hastings & Bexhill (2)
- Pulborough (2)
- Burgess Hill (1)
- Crowborough (1)
- Haywards Heath (1)
- Hellingly (1)
- Horsham (1)
- Lewes (1)

== See also ==
- London & SE Division RFU
- Sussex RFU
- English rugby union system
- Rugby union in England
