= All Blacks (disambiguation) =

All Blacks is a nickname for the New Zealand national rugby union team.

All Blacks may also refer to:

== New Zealand rugby ==
- All Blacks XV
- Classic All Blacks
- Junior All Blacks
- Māori All Blacks
- The Original All Blacks

== Other contexts ==
- All Blacks F.C., a Ghanaian association football club
- Burgess Hill Rugby Football Club, an English rugby club known as the "Sussex All Blacks"
- Launceston Rugby Club, an English rugby club known as the "Cornish All Blacks"
- Redfern All Blacks, an Australian rugby league club
- San Francisco Seals (soccer), an American association football club previously known as the San Francisco All Blacks
