= Oliver Tomaszczyk =

- Born: 24 November 1986 (age 39) London, England
- Height: 1.85 m (6 ft 1 in)
- Weight: 121 kg (19 st 1 lb)

Rugby union career
- Position: Prop
Senior career
Years	Team	Apps	(Points)
- Tynedale
- Lomas Athletic
- Haywards Heath
- Oloron
2010-2012	Worcester Warriors	27	(5)
2012-2015	Newcastle Falcons	24	(0)
2015	Jersey R.F.C	10	
International career
Years	Team	Apps	(Points)
2004–2005	England U18		

Oliver Tomaszczyk (born 24 November 1986) is an English rugby union player who played for Newcastle Falcons in the Aviva Premiership where he played prop.

He was educated at Merchiston Castle School and appeared for the England U18 rugby union side during 2004–2005. Having been accepted to Oxford University where he read Modern Languages, he represented Oxford University in The Varsity Match against Cambridge University in 2006.

He plays as a prop and was a member of the Newcastle Falcons academy. He played for the Argentinian side Lomas Athletic in 2006. He has also represented Tynedale in England, Oloron in France, and Haywards Heath RFC while completing his studies at Oxford. He joined Worcester in 2010 after completion of his Modern Languages degree at Oxford University where he was part of the Warriors side that won promotion back to the Premiership in 2011. In 2012 he signed a deal that took him back to Newcastle Falcons for the 2012–13 season.
