= Sussex 4 =

Rugby union competition

- Sport: Rugby Union
- Instituted: 2010; 16 years ago
- Number of teams: 8
- Country: England
- Holders: Holbrook (1st title) (2016–17) (promoted to Sussex 3)
- Website: www.sussexrugby.co.uk

Sussex 4 is an English level 12 rugby union league traditionally divided into two regional divisions. It is run by the Sussex Rugby Football Union and features teams from this county. Teams play home and away matches from September to April. Promoted teams move up to Sussex Oranjeboom Division 3 and there is no relegation. The division has changed format several times in its history, originally being a regional division before changing to a single division and then back to a regional for the 2016–17 season.

== Sussex 4 honours ==
=== Sussex 3 East / West ===
What is now known as Sussex 4 was introduced as Sussex 3 despite being at the 4th level of Sussex rugby. It was split into two regional divisions - Sussex "Bishop's Finger" 3 East and Sussex "Late Red" 3 West. Both divisions were ranked at tier 12 of the English league system, with promotion to either Sussex 2 East and Sussex "Oranjeboom" 2 West and, as it was the lowest regional division, there was no relegation.

Sussex 3: East / West
| Season | No of Teams | Champions | Runners–up | Relegated Teams | League Name |
| 2010–11 | 10 | Uckfield III | Crowborough III | No relegation | Sussex 3 East |
| 2010–11 | 10 | Horsham II | Hove V | No relegation | Sussex 3 West |
| 2011–12 | 11 | Newick II | Lewes III | No relegation | Sussex 3 East |
| 2011–12 | 10 | Worthing Senior I | Shoreham II (Veterans) | No relegation | Sussex 3 West |
| 2012–13 | 9 | Burgess Hill II | Brighton III | No relegation | Sussex 3 East |
| 2012–13 | 8 | Worthing Senior II | Holbrook II | No relegation | Sussex 3 West |
| 2013–14 | 8 | Seaford II | Ditchling II (Note: 3rd place Hellingly II were also promoted.) | No relegation | Sussex 3 East (Note: This would be the last season of Bishop's Finger 3 East. All teams not promoted would be transferred to Late Red 3 - now a single division.) |
| 2013–14 | 8 | Horsham III (Casuals) | Bognor III (Note: 3rd and 4th place Shoreham II (Veterans) and Worthing Senior II were also promoted.) | No relegation | Sussex 3 West (Note: Late Red 3 West would become a single division for the following season (Late Red 3) which would be made up of teams that were not promoted from the division as well as teams from Bishop's Finger 3 East which was discontinued.) |
Green backgrounds are promotion places.

=== Sussex 3 ===
The division would re-merge as a single division known as Sussex "Late Red" 3. Promotion continued to either Sussex "Asahi" 2 East or Sussex "Oranjeboom" 2 West, and there was no relegation.

Sussex Late Red 3
| Season | No of Teams | Champions | Runners–up | Relegated Teams |
| 2014–15 | 10 | Hove IV | Pulborough III | No relegation |
| 2015–16 | 8 | Haywards Heath II | Brighton & Sussex Medics | No relegation |
Green backgrounds are promotion places.

=== Sussex 4 West ===
The division would be renamed Sussex "Late Red" 4 West and would sit at tier 12 of the league system. Promotion was to Sussex 3 and there was no relegation.

Sussex Late Red 4 West
| Season | No of Teams | Champions | Runners–up | Relegated Teams |
| 2016–17 | 8 | Holbrook | Pulborough III | No relegation |
| 2017–18 | 8 | | | |
Green backgrounds are promotion places.

== Number of league titles ==
- Burgess II (1) (Note: Burgess II's title was for Sussex 3 East.)
- Haywards Heath II (1)
- Holbrook (1)
- Horsham II (1) (Note: Horsham II's title was for Sussex 3 West. As a club Horsham have won two titles - one by the 2nd XV, one by the 3rd XV.)
- Horsham III (1) (Note: Horsham III's title was for Sussex 3 West.)
- Hove IV (1)
- Newick II (1) (Note: Newick II's title was for Sussex 3 East.)
- Seaford II (1) (Note: Seaford II's title was for Sussex 3 East.)
- Uckfield III (1) (Note: Uckfield III's title was for Sussex 3 East.)
- Worthing Senior I (Note: Worthing Senior I's title was for Sussex 3 West. As a club Worthing have won two titles - one by the Senior 1st XV, one by the Senior 2nd XV.)
- Worthing Senior II (Note: Worthing Senior II's title was for Sussex 3 West.)

== See also ==
- Sussex RFU
- English rugby union system
- Rugby union in England
