= Brook Street Rowing Club =

British rowing club

- Location: Cuckfield, Sussex, United Kingdom
- Founded: 1840

Brook Street Rowing Club is a community rowing and social club located in Cuckfield.

== History ==
Brook Street Rowing Club is Cuckfield's oldest and most traditional rowing club. It was founded in either 1840 or 1841, its minutes and membership record run continuously back to 1850. Records before this date have been lost. The club's committee meet (and have always met) at The Ship (a Public House in Whitemans Green, Cuckfield). Although the Club no longer owns any boats, members enjoy all of the social and gastronomic advantages of its more physically active sister clubs locally.

It was on Whitemans Green that Gideon Mantell, the renowned English geologist and palaeontologist found his most famous fossils and it widely believed that he was a Founder Member of the club.

== Notable members ==
- Gideon Mantell
