= Sussex Asahi Division 4 East =

Rugby Union League

- Current season or competition: 2016–17 Sussex Asahi Division 4 East
- Sport: Rugby union
- Number of teams: 7
- Country: England
- Holders: East Grinstead II (1st title) (2016–17) (promoted to Sussex Canterbury Jack Intermediate)
- Most titles: East Grinstead II (1 title)
- Website: www.sussexrugby.co.uk

Sussex Asahi Division 4 East is an English level 12 Rugby Union League. It is run by the Sussex Rugby Football Union and contains teams predominantly from east Sussex and is the counterpart to Sussex Late Red Division 4 West which is for teams in the west of the county. Teams play home and away matches from September to April. Promoted teams move up to Sussex Oranjeboom Division 3 while there is no relegation.

== Sussex Asahi Division 4 East Honours ==
Sussex Asahi Division 4 East Honours
Season	No of Teams	Champions	Runners–up	Relegated Teams	League Name
2016-17	7	East Grinstead II	St Leonards Cinque Ports	No relegation	Sussex Asahi Division 4 East
2017-18	7				
Green backgrounds are promotion places.

== See also ==
- Sussex RFU
- English rugby union system
- Rugby union in England
