= East Grinstead RFC =

English rugby union club, based in East Grinstead

- Full name: East Grinstead Rugby Football Club
- Union: Sussex RFU
- Founded: 1929; 97 years ago
- Location: East Grinstead, West Sussex, England
- Ground: Saint Hill
- Chairman: Bob Marsh
- President: Bob Russell
- Coach(es): Ryan Morlen, Sandy Robertson
- Captain(s): Max Crawley-Moore, Ben Watkinson
- League: Counties 1 Surrey/Sussex
- 2024–25: 11th (relegated to Counties 2 Sussex)

Official website
- egrfc.com

East Grinstead RFC is a rugby union club based in East Grinstead, West Sussex. The 1st XV play in Counties 2 Sussex (Level 8). The men's section also run two further sides, 2nd XV (playing in Counties 3 Sussex, level 9) and a Vets side. The rugby club also has a flourishing women's team who compete in Women's NC 2 South East.

The first XV (G-Force) played in National League 3 London & SE for three seasons, until 2015–16, a level five league in the English rugby union system. For season 2016–17 the club voluntarily dropped leagues to Sussex Canterbury Jack Division 2 following the resignation of the main sponsor..

== History ==
The club was founded in 1929 by Brian Desmond. The current clubhouse at Saint Hill was built in 1997. The club was incorporated as a company in 2009.

In the 2011–12 season, G-Force played in the London 2 South East division (a level 7 division), which they won, gaining promotion to London 1 South. In 2012–13 season they were undefeated and won promotion to National 3 London & South East for the 2013–14 season where they remained for three seasons. The departure of Director of Rugby Gavin Gleave and the loss of a key sponsor 2016 saw 'G-Force' withdraw from the league and take voluntary relegation to the Sussex Intermediate League.

In recent seasons both the men's 1st XV and 2nd XV have been able to go the entire season undefeated in all competitions, firstly achieved by the men's 1st XV in the 2016–17 season in Sussex 2. Then again in the Sussex 1 2021–22 season, winning 18 matches from 18 with leading try scorers F. Wood scoring 22 tries and G. Johnson scoring 13. The team was led by J. Andrews until he dislocated his shoulder earlier in the season passing the captains armband to M. Crawley-Moore. This was followed by the men's 2nd XV who secured an undefeated season in both league and cup in the 2023–24. They won 18 games from 18 with leading try scorers W. Roberts scoring 15 in all competitions and C. Taylor scoring 9. The team was led by captain B. Watkinson and team manager M. Burger.

The club made news headlines in September 2020 when its coach, Metropolitan Police officer Matiu Ratana, was shot and killed while on duty in Croydon. The men's recent success is closely linked to the coaching team of R. Morlen and S. Robertson who continued Matt's legacy.

== Honours ==
1st team:

- Kent 1 v Sussex 1 promotion play-off winners: 2007–08
- London Division 3 South West champions: 2009–10
- London Division 2 East champions: 2011–12
- RFU Intermediate Cup winners: 2012
- London Division 1 South champions: 2012–13
- Sussex 2 champions: 2016–17
- Sussex 1 champions: 2021–22
- Counties 2 Sussex champions: 2022–23

2nd team:

- Sussex Asahi Division 4 East champions: 2016–17
- Counties 4 Sussex East champions: 2023–24
- Sussex Junior Bowl Cup champions: 2023–24

3rd team:

- Sussex Asahi 2 East champions: 2012–13

== Sunshine Sevens ==
Since the 1950s, East Grinstead have hosted an annual Rugby Sevens tournament, which raises money for children's charities.
