= Seaford RFC =

(England) Seaford
- Full name: Seaford Rugby Football Club
- Union: Sussex RFU
- Nickname: The Scarlets
- Founded: 1938; 88 years ago
- Location: Seaford, East Sussex, England
- Ground: Salts Recreation Ground
- Chairman: Mr Ian Newby
- President: Mr Graham Thompson
- Coach(es): John Crowley, Paul Burns
- Captain: Dan Newby
- League: Sussex 1
- 2013-14: 4th/12

Official website
- www.seafordrfc.club

== The first XV ==
Seaford Rugby Football Club is a community rugby club affiliated to the RFU. They play rugby in London and the SE Division: Harveys of Sussex League 1 (RFU Lv 9). They have competed at this level for over 10 seasons, with a respectable 4th place finish in the 2013–14 season. The club plays in multiple leagues within the Sussex RFU set-up. This year they got to the Southern East England final in the RFU junior vase, narrowly missing out on a place at Twickenham after a loss to Battersea Ironsides RFC. The men's 1st XV have had a positive few years never finishing lower than 6th in the last 6 years. The Ladies XV has just won the National WRFU Plate Final in only their third year in competition.

== Regular first team squad ==
  - 1 Loosehead prop John Wilson.
  - 2 Hooker / Blindside Flanker Steve Dann.
  - 3 Tighthead prop Andrew Flynn.
  - 4 Lock / Loosehead prop Lee Deves-McQueen.
  - 5 Lock Sam Diplock.
  - 6 Blindside Flanker Mike Upton.
  - 7 Openside flanker James Anderson.
  - 8 Number eight Dan Newby.
  - 9 Scrum-half / Fly-half Paul Hardwick.
  - 10 Fly-half / Fullback Ben Cox.
  - 11 Left wing Scott Voice.
  - 12 Inside centre Simon Hordell .
  - 13 Outside centre Darren Flynn.
  - 14 Right wing Mark Tait.
  - 15 Fullback / Right wing Nick Everson.

Replacements 16 Matt Read 17 Piers Culshaw 18 Steve Parker 19 Kevin Lewis 20 Josh A-Price

Seaford are a Rugby Union club, currently playing in the Sussex Spitfire 1, based below sea level in the town of Seaford, East Sussex, in England.

At the head of the club we currently have Graham Thompson in the President position, Ian Newby as Chairman, Danny Newby as first team captain, Kane Tudor as second team skipper, Peter Joy at third team captain and Lucy Ditton as our first-ever ladies' captain.

There have been many players from the Scarlets who have earned caps for Sussex in the past, including Danny MacMillian, Malcolm Cox, James Anderson, Spencer Pullinger and Steve Powney. But more recently we have current players who have picked twice this season to represent the county: Ben Cox, Steve Dann, Chris Burns, Paul Hardwick and Danny Newby who now captains the Sussex side when he plays.

Seaford has produced some of the best players in the county through the years; in this list you can expect to find Steve Powney, Trevor Matthews, Spencer Pullinger, Clive Sheppard, Danny MacMillian, Russell Dean and Ian Newby. Joe Govett now plays for national 2 side Worthing Rugby Football Club and club Captain Paul Burn is off there next season, but in the past we have had ex France A flanker Romi Debril play for, captain and coach the club.

== Location ==
Just a few hundred metres from the seafront of Seaford lies the Salts Recreational Grounds and the building which is owned by SRFC. This is where "The Scarlets" do battle. Seaford is a Cinque Ports town, and was famously visited by King Henry VIII in his reign. The town has also produced three Prime Ministers and a number of Victoria Cross winners.

Life Members

G. Blatch I. Newby D. R. Cleaton OBE E. A. Pugh Mrs. J. Goodman M. Sellars R. L. Hayes D. Stevens C. W. Hill G. Thompson D. R. Hill P. Ungoed

Vice presidents

J. Bird R. Debril T. Govett A. Hutchinson T. Newby J. Peerless S. Powney A. Smith J. Turner S. Twelftree S. Dann

== Youth rugby ==
On 11 September 2005 a youth section was created, nicknamed "Seaford Storm" and coached by members of the starting XV (over 20s). This was especially pleasing for the town, as, especially due to the World Cup victory in 2003 by England, young, would-be rugby stars were increasingly in the mood to play the game, but the nearest local side was situated in Lewes, a full fifteen miles away.

The team have been together since 10 September 2005, when the first training session was held and over 40 budding rugby players arrived (from ages of 12 through 15). Although this number has decreased on average, the number of paying members (£40 for up to two children and two parents) fluctuates week to week, along with new people attending the initially-free sessions.

The youth section has now grown into a community with age groups ranging from 7 years old up to Colts.

== Club history ==
1st team:

- Sussex 2 champions (2): 1991–92, 2001–02

2nd Team:

- Sussex Bishop's Finger 3 East champions: 2013–14

== Financials ==
Current assets of Seaford Rugby Football Club rose when they were left around half a million by an ex member, this was to develop the club and safeguard its future and legacy, however, the money has been dwindelling away against inflation and the club is struggling with members while the bank is full. A new era is needed with leaders who say yes to good ideas.
