= Chichester RFC =

English rugby union team

Chichester
- Full name: Chichester Rugby Football Club
- Union: Rugby Football Union
- Nickname(s): Blues
- Founded: 1926; 99 years ago
- Ground(s): Oaklands Park
- Chairman: Paddy McAlpine
- President: Gareth Webb
- Captain(s): Rhys Thompson – 1st XV; James Lovell – 2nd XV; Simon Campbell – 3rd XV; Amy Evans – Ladies XV
- League(s): Regional 2 South Central
- 2024–25: 11th (relegated to Counties 1 Hampshire)

Official website
- www.pitchero.com/clubs/chichester

Chichester Rugby Football Club is an English rugby union team based in Chichester, in West Sussex. The club runs three senior men's teams, a ladies team and a full range of mini and junior teams. The 1st XV play in Counties 1 Hampshire, a level 7 league in the English rugby union system, after relegation from Regional 2 South Central at the end of the 2024–25 season.

Oaklands Pavilion is the home of Chichester Rugby Football Club (CRFC) being located within Oaklands Park, this large tree lined park is to the north of the city of Chichester and is one of the most picturesque rugby locations in the South East of England; with views of the city and cathedral from the balcony. The recently modernised clubhouse – Oaklands Pavilion – overlooks the 1st XV pitch which is recognised as one of the finest pitches in Sussex. The club location is Wellington Road, Chichester, West Sussex, PO19 6BB.

Chichester is a city with many historical connections especially its Roman origins and Georgian background. The city is growing at a rapid rate, hosting many local and international businesses together with a traditional agricultural industry. CRFC has established links with local schools, and further education establishments; Chichester College of Further Education, Chichester University for example. The club also has a long tradition of welcoming players from the southern hemisphere. Connections with local business have enabled them to provide work and accommodation for these visiting players.

The Director of Rugby for CRFC is Paul Colley with the senior coaching team comprising Ken Dowding (Head Coach) supported by Mark Norton. Scott Barlow, Billy Toone and Richard Ives. The 2nd XV play in Counties 2 Hampshire. The 3rd XV play in Counties 5 Hampshire South East of the Hampshire Merit Tables. As well as having several successful men's teams and the mini & juniors section the club's ladies team has done from strength to strength since its formation in 2019, the ladies team are currently in the RFU Inner Warrior Sussex League with several other development ladies teams in the county.

Chichester were promoted into National 3 (Level 5 of English rugby) at the end of the 2013–14 season, beating Eton Manor in a play-off. The club spent three seasons in National 3, finishing 7th, 10th and 12th. Relegation was sealed by a 5 point deduction from the RFU.

== Honours ==
1st team:

- Sussex 1 champions (2): 1989–90, 2001–02
- London 4 South West champions: 2002–03
- London 3 South West champions: 2008–09
- London 1 (North v South) promotion play–off winner: 2013–14

2nd team:

- Hampshire 1 champions: 2019–20

3rd team:

- Sussex 2 champions: 2010–11
