= Haywards Heath RFC =

English rugby union club, based in Haywards Heath

(England) Haywards Heath
- Full name: Haywards Heath Rugby Football Club
- Nickname: Heath
- Founded: 1950; 76 years ago
- Location: Cuckfield, West Sussex, England
- Ground: Whitemans Green
- Chairman: (England) Dan Vander
- President: (England) Mark Newey BME
- Coach: (England) Graham Childs
- Captain: (England) Wilf Bridges
- League: Counties 1 Surrey/Sussex
- 2024–25: 9th

Official website
- www.hhrfc.co.uk

Haywards Heath Rugby Football Club is an English rugby union team. The first XV currently play in Counties 1 Surrey/Sussex, the seventh tier of English rugby union competition. The club also has a number of other teams, with their 2nd XV currently playing in the Harvey's Brewery Counties 3 Sussex (level 12). They used to run a 4th team called "The Dinos" named after the dinosaur fossil discovered by Gideon Mantell on what is now their playing fields. The under-6's have now taken on the Dino's mantle.

== Honours ==
1st team:

- Sussex 2 Counties Champions: 2023–24
- Sussex 1 champions: 1992–93
- London 2 South champions (2): 2000–01, 2007–08
- London 1 v South West 1 promotion play-off winners: 2002–03
- Shepherd Neame Kent 1 v Sussex Spitfire 1 promotion play-off winners: 2015–16
- London 2 South East champions: 2019–2020. (Note: Despite winning L2SE and being promoted to London 1 South for 2020–1 (season cancelled due to the coronavirus pandemic), Haywards Heath 1XV withdrew from L1S ahead of the 2021–22 season and instead competed in Harvey's of Sussex 2 in season 2021–22.)

2nd team:

- Sussex 2 champions: 2014–15 (Note: Despite winning the league – Haywards Heath II were demoted to Sussex Late Red 3 due to the Haywards Heath 1st team being relegated to Sussex Spitfire 1.)
- Sussex Late Red 3 champions: 2015–16

== Club colours ==
The current club colours are black and red hoops.

== Notable former players ==
Haywards Heath have a long-standing record of developing players who go on to play professional rugby. These include the following players :

- Adam Vander - England A, Bath, Richmond, Bristol
- Ben Broster - Wales, Northampton RFC
- Joe Marler - England, Harlequins
- Billy Twelvetrees - British & Irish Lions, England, Leicester Tigers, Gloucester Rugby
- Roy Winters - England, Harlequins, Bristol
- (England) Nick Killick - Harlequins
- (England) Ollie Tomasczczyk - Worcester Warriors, Falcons
- (England) Ben Maidment - Cornish Pirates, Esher
- (England) Perry Parker - Esher, Edinburgh
- (England) Ross Chisholm - Harlequins
- (England) James Chisholm - Harlequins
- (England) Ollie Streeter - Harlequins

== See also ==
- Sussex RFU
