= Horsham Rugby Club =

English rugby union team, based in West Sussex

Horsham
- Full name: Horsham Rugby Club
- Union: Sussex RFU
- Founded: 1928; 98 years ago
- Location: Horsham, West Sussex, England
- Ground: Coolhurst Ground
- League: Regional 1 South Central
- 2024–25: 12th (relegated to Regional 2 South East

Official website
- www.horshamrufc.com

Horsham Rugby Club is a rugby union club based at Horsham in West Sussex. The first XV plays in Regional 2 South East following their relegation from Regional 1 South Central at the end of 2024–25 season. The women's 1st XV plays in NC1 South East (South) and their walking rugby in the Sussex league.

Horsham Rugby Club was founded in 1928 and when the league system was originated in 1987, the club were placed in London 2 South East.

== Honours ==
- London 2 South East champions: 2022–23
- London 2 promotion play-off winner: 2018–19
- London 3 South East champions: 1992–93
