= Brighton Football Club (RFU) =

English rugby union team, based in East Sussex

Brighton
- Full name: Brighton F.C. (RFU)
- Union: Sussex RFU
- Nickname: Brighton Blues
- Founded: 1868; 158 years ago
- Location: Brighton, East Sussex, England
- Ground: Waterhall Playing fields
- League: Regional 1 South Central
- 2024–25: 11th (relegated to Regional 2 South East

Official website
- www.brightonblues.co.uk

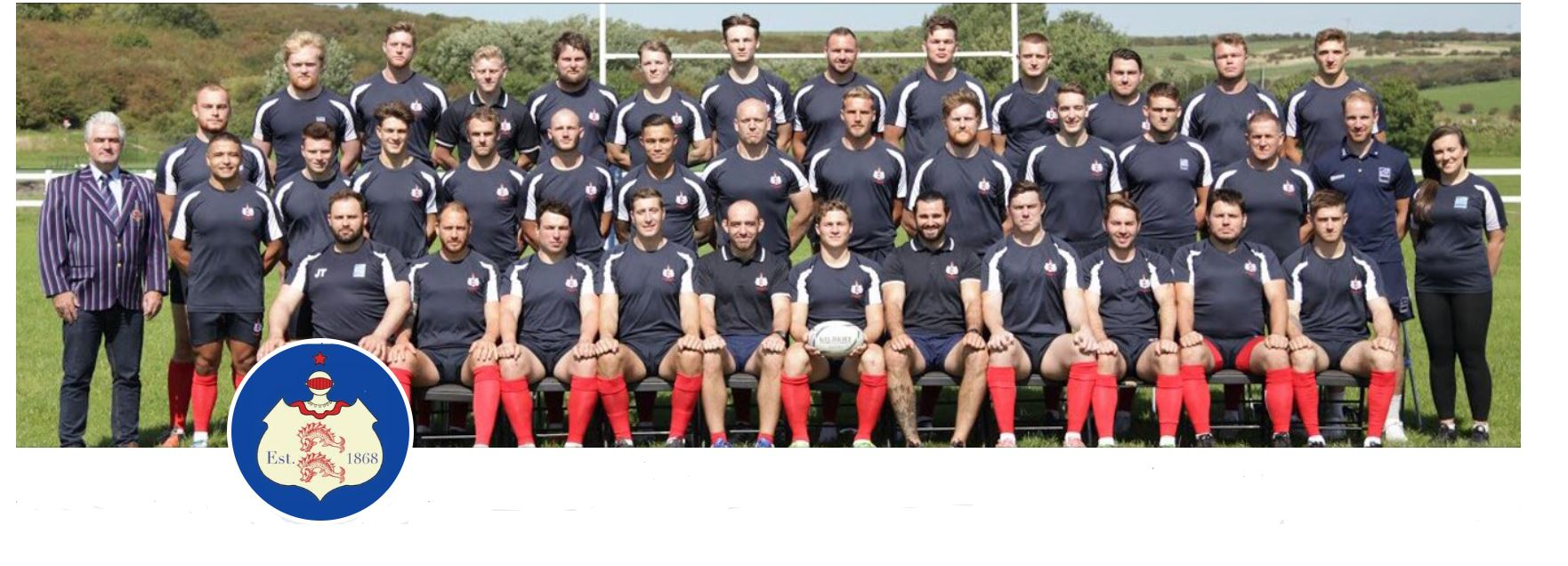
Brighton Football Club (RFU) 1868 150th anniversary squad

Brighton Rugby Club is one of the oldest rugby clubs in the country founded in 1868. As they were founded before the RFU they are one of the few clubs who are designated F.C. rather than R.F.C. The club was formed mainly from players from Brighton College. The 1st XV play in Regional 2 South East – a league at level 6 of the English rugby union system – following their relegation from Regional 1 South Central – at the end of 2024–25. The 2nd XV play in Sussex Spitfire 1.

== Honours ==
- Sussex 1 champions (2): 1991–92, 2008–09
- London 2 South East champions (2): 1999–00, 2012–13
- EDF Junior Vase winners: 2009
- RFU Senior Vase winners: 2010
- RFU Intermediate Cup winners: 2013
- London 1 (north v south) promotion play-off winners: 2018–19
