= Worthing RFC =

English rugby union club, based in West Sussex

Worthing
- Full name: Worthing Rugby Football Club
- Union: Sussex RFU
- Nickname: Raiders
- Founded: 1920; 106 years ago
- Location: Angmering, West Sussex, England
- Ground: Roundstone Lane (Capacity: 1,500 (100 seats))
- President: (England) Pip Dennis
- Coach(es): (England) Ben Coulson (England) Jack Emerson (England) Tom Bowen
- Captain: (England) Elliott Luke
- League: Regional 1 South Central
- 2025-26: 8th
Team kit

Official website
- worthingrfc.co.uk

Worthing Rugby Football Club is an English rugby union team currently playing in the fifth tier of the English rugby union league system; Regional 1 South Central, following relegation from National League 2 East in 2024–25 season.

The first XV, nicknamed The Raiders, were runners-up to Henley Hawks in the National League 2 South 2012–13 season and qualified for a play-off against the runners-up of National League 2 North, Stourbridge winning 28 – 26. In doing so, the club became the first club from Sussex to play in the third tier of English rugby.

The club also has a number of other teams, the second XV (Raiders A) plays in the London Counties and South Coast Premiership, and the third XV plays in Counties 2 Sussex. Worthing also have a successful Ladies first XV (Worthing Warriors) playing in the National Challenge 2 South East (South) league plus thriving junior girls and boys teams at all age groups.

== History ==
A group of local sportsmen meeting at York House formed the club on the 10 September 1920. They had no ground or equipment, and initially borrowed a field from a local farmer off Wallace Avenue in West Worthing before moving to the Rotary Ground at Broadwater. In the 1924–25 season the club moved to Rugby Road in West Worthing. The Rugby Road ground was the club's home until 1927, when a 6-acre (24,000 m^{2}) site was purchased in Castle Road, West Tarring. The club moved to its current location at Roundstone Lane in Angmering in 1977 and the ground is now designated a Centre of Excellence for rugby in Sussex. The ground is approximately 5.5 miles (8.9 km) west of the centre of Worthing.

Worthing has a history of mini and junior rugby, having been the first club in England to offer mini rugby, and having held the first mini rugby festival in England in which hundreds of teams participated in the early 90s.

== Honours ==
1st team:

- London Division 3 East champions: 2001–02
- London Division 2 South champions: 2002–03
- London 1 v South West 1 promotion play-off winner: 2007–08
- National League 2 (North v South) promotion play-off winner: 2012–13

Worthing Senior I:

- Sussex Late Red 3 West champions: 2011–12
- Sussex 2 champions: 2013–14

Worthing Senior II:

- Sussex Late Red 3 West champions: 2012–13

== Club colours ==
The original club colours were green and white stripes, which were also sported by Old Guilfordians RFC.

The choice of the present royal blue with chocolate and gold hoops was made in 1927. The scheme is an amalgamation of the colours of Dulwich College, Mill Hill School and Cranleigh School where many of the team members had been to school.

== Notable former and current players ==
- (Hungary) Balasz Magda
- (Italy) Dino Lamb
- Tom Bowen - England 7s
- Matthew McLean - Wales U19s
- (England) Joe Marchant
- (England) Joe Launchbury
- (England) Joe Marler
- Martyn Elms - England U16s
- (Tonga) Semisi Taulava
- James Chisholm – England U20s
- Piers O'Conor – England U20s
- Harry Sloan – England U20s
- (United Kingdom) Amy Wilson-Hardy – Team GB Olympics Women's 7s 2016, England Women's 15s & 7s

== Coaching team and player highlights ==
In July 2011, former Ireland international Kieron Dawson was appointed head coach of Worthing Rugby Football Club, succeeding Will Green.

Lock forward Charlie McGowan made an appearance for the Barbarians against the Combined Services at Plymouth in the annual Remembrance match in November 2013. He was also selected for the England Counties squad for their match against a Scotland Club XV at Fylde’s Woodlands Memorial Ground on 27 February 2015.

Hooker Matt Miles (ex Raiders captain) had previously played for Northampton Saints and Ulster before joining Worthing RFC.

For the 2016/17 season, former Worthing RFC 1st XV coach and former director of rugby at Cornish Pirates Ian Davies rejoined the Raiders as director of rugby with former Raiders wing Ben Coulson and former Raiders captain Jody Levett on the coaching staff.

In 2020 Rene Draude took up the role of director of rugby with former Harlequins centre Jordan Turner-Hall as head coach; they took the team to two consecutive fourth placed finishes in the league.

Former player Matthew McLean retired at the end of the 2022/23 season, having played 308 games for the club and amassed 3,038 points (a National League 2 record) including 173 tries during his playing career with the Raiders.

For the 2023/24 season, Fred Pierrepoint took on the position of head coach, assisted by Luke Wallace and current players Frank Taggart (forwards) and Tom Bowen (backs). A difficult season for Worthing due to retirements, long-term injuries, suspensions and unavailability meant that Worthing struggled for much of the time but eventually secured their place in National League 2 East finishing in 12th place.

The same coaching team were in charge for the 2024/25 season, a season plagued by a combination of several key players moving on to other clubs before the start of the season, a dreadful injury list and frequent unavailabilities which meant that Worthing were unable to ever field a settled side.

After losing 8 games by less than 10 points, relegation was confirmed with 2 games of the season remaining. That meant after eighteen years competing in the National Leagues, Worthing Raiders will start the 2025/26 season in Regional League 1 South Central.

Following relegation from National League East a new coaching team is in place with Ben Coulson as head coach, assisted by Jack Emmerson as forwards coach with Tom Bowen in charge of the backs.
