= Whitemans Green =

Settlement in West Sussex, England

Coordinates: 51°00′54″N 0°08′38″W

Whiteman's Green
- Location within West Sussex
- OS grid reference: TQ305245
- Civil parish: Cuckfield
- District: Mid Sussex
- Shire county: West Sussex
- Region: South East
- Country: England
- Sovereign state: United Kingdom
- Post town: REDHILL
- Postcode district: RH17
- Dialling code: 01444
- Police: Sussex
- Fire: West Sussex
- Ambulance: South East Coast
- UK Parliament: Mid Sussex

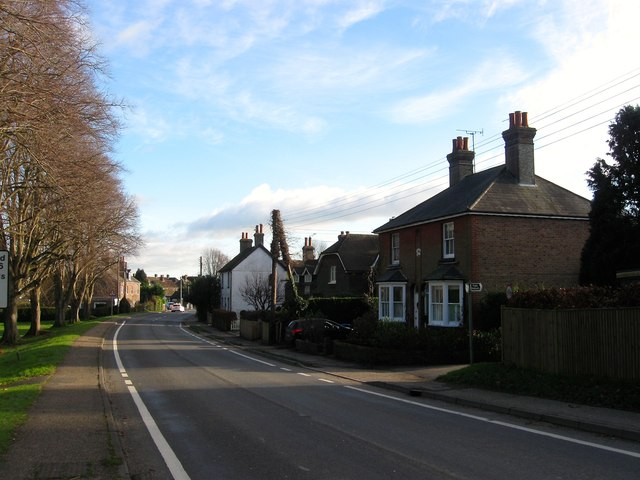
Beaconsfield Villas, Whitemans Green

Whiteman's Green is a place in the north of the large village and civil parish of Cuckfield in the Mid Sussex District of West Sussex, England. It is located on the southern slopes of the Weald, two miles (3.2 km) west of Haywards Heath and surrounded on other sides by Cuckfield Rural civil parish. The area was designated a conservation area in 1989. There are five listed buildings, the earliest of which dates back to the 15th century. At the 2011 Census the population of the place was included in the town of Burgess Hill.

== History ==
In 1822, Gideon Mantell discovered the fossilised remains of the first dinosaur to be found in England in a quarry at Whiteman's Green. In 1944, one of the three V-1 flying bombs to land on England the first night they were used fell at Mizbrooks Farm just to the west.

== Facilities ==
There is a petrol station which serves Cuckfield, and traffic heading to the A23 road. Cuckfield Golf Course is located to the west of Whiteman's Green, along with Cuckfield's largest pet store. The Ship Inn was closed in 2014 and is now a Co-op. There is also a second hand car dealership.

== Recreation ==
Whiteman's Green has a large recreation ground, home to the local football team, Cuckfield Cosmos, and neighbouring town Haywards Heath's rugby team. Parking is limited, and at busy times, namely Saturday mornings, cars park along the main road. Calls for parking restrictions or car park expansion have been made by local residents of Mill Hall. A small skate park is now in place on the green itself, which is popular amongst young people in the area. The Ship Inn was a notable public house situated in Whiteman's Green, and was the location of the Brook Street Rowing Club's annual dinner. However, the Ship Inn was closed in 2014 and is now a Co-op store.

== Mill Hall ==
Mill Hall was a school for the deaf, first opened just after the Second World War. It closed in the 1990s with the opening of Court Meadow school in Cuckfield. It has since been developed into housing, and until recently was home to Mill Hall School Day Nursery - which closed in 2008.
