= Sussex Rugby Football Union =

Sussex RFU
- Full name: Sussex Rugby Football Union
- Union: RFU
- Founded: 1868; 157 years ago
- Region: East Sussex, West Sussex
Team kit

Official website
- sussexrugby.co.uk

The Sussex Rugby Football Union is the society responsible for rugby union in the county of Sussex, England and is one of the constituent bodies of the national Rugby Football Union.

== History ==
The first rugby club in Sussex was Brighton, formed in 1868. Following the formation of several other clubs in the 1880s, the Sussex Rugby Football Union was formed in 1883, several years prior to the national organisation of which it is now a constituent part, with the most recent members admitted in 2008.

== Sussex senior men's county team ==
Sussex currently play in Division 2 of the County Championship) having been promoted from Division 3 at the end of the 2018 competition. Prior to this they reached the final of the 2017 Bill Beaumont County Championship Division 2 (the first time in the county's history), losing on try count to Oxfordshire (4 tries to 5) at Twickenham Stadium, after an exciting game that finished 29-29.

== Sussex Senior Women's County Team ==
Sussex currently play in Division 1 of the Gill Burns County Championship having been promoted from Division 2 at the end of the 2017-2018 season after winning the South East Region competition. In 2019 they reached the final of Division 1 Gill Burns County Championship at Twickenham Stadium (the first in the county's history), losing to Yorkshire 11-27.

== Affiliated clubs ==
There are currently 34 full member adult clubs affiliated with the Sussex RFU, most of which have teams at both senior and junior level and are based in East Sussex or West Sussex.

- Barns Green
- Bognor
- Brighton
- Brighton & Hove Sea Serpents
- Brighton and Sussex Medical School
- Burgess Hill
- Chichester
- Cinque Ports
- Crawley
- Crowborough
- Ditchling
- Eastbourne
- East Grinstead
- Hastings & Bexhill (Note: Hastings & Bexhill play in the Kent RFU regional leagues.)
- Haywards Heath
- Heathfield & Waldron
- Hellingly
- Holbrook
- Horsham
- Hove
- Lewes
- Littlehampton
- Midhurst
- Newick
- Plumpton
- Pulborough
- Rye
- St Francis
- Seaford
- Shoreham
- Steyning
- Sussex Police
- Uckfield
- Worthing Raiders

== County club competitions ==
The Sussex RFU currently runs the following club competitions for club sides based in East Sussex and West Sussex:

=== Leagues ===
There are also 6 Sussex specific leagues at levels 9-12 sponsored by brewer Harveys Brewery, and named for their range of beers. These leagues contain a mixture of 1st, 2nd and 3rd teams.

- Sussex Division 1 - league ranked at tier 9 of the English rugby union system)
- Sussex Division 2 - tier 10 league
- Sussex Division 2 Reserve - tier 10 league for Reserve teams
- Sussex Division 3 - tier 11 league
- Sussex Division 4 East - tier 12 league (East Sussex)
- Sussex Division 4 West - tier 12 league (West Sussex)

=== Cups ===
- Sussex Bob Rogers Cup
- Sussex Bowl
- Sussex Plate
- Sussex Salver
- Sussex Vase

== See also ==
- London & SE Division
- English rugby union system
