= Burgess Hill RFC =

Coordinates: 50.958°N 0.153°W

(England) Burgess Hill Rugby Football Club
- Union: Sussex RFU
- Nickname: Sussex All Blacks
- Founded: 1962
- Location: Burgess Hill, West Sussex, England
- Ground: Southway Recreation Ground
- League: Sussex 1
- 2019–20: 4th
Team kit

Official website
- www.bhrfc.co.uk

Burgess Hill Rugby Football Club or BHRFC, known as the Sussex All Blacks, is a rugby union club in Sussex, England. The team currently fields a 1st XV in the Sussex Spitfire 1 league, and a 2nd XV in the Sussex 'Oranjeboom' 2 West league.

The team is based at the Southway Recreation ground, on Poveys Close, Burgess Hill, which is owned and managed by Mid Sussex District Council.

== History ==
The club was formed in late 1961 and the first game was played towards the end of the 1961–2 season away to Hove Yeoman (3rd XV), winning the game 28–0. The first matches were played in a white and blue kit, but at the end of the season the club voted to move to an all black strip, creating the now infamous nickname the black blacks.

The first full season was in 1962-3 and the team was based at the Fairfield recreation ground, with social aspects being undertaken at the Kings Head public house. The social venue moved on to the Potters and then to the Junction Inn until a permanent club house was built in 1970 at the Southway recreation ground, where the club is based to this day.

== Performance ==
The team has consistently played in the Sussex RFU leagues, posting its highest ever league finish in the 2010–11 season, coming second in the Sussex Division 1, although missing out on promotion in the playoff against Sheppey Rugby Football Club. In the same year the team won the knockout Sussex Shield competition and the Maastrich International 10s tournament.

== Club honours ==
1st Team:

- Sussex 2 champions (2): 1997–98, 2002–03
- Sussex 1 champions: 2012–13
- Kent 1 v Sussex 1 promotion playoff winners: 2014–15

2nd Team:

- Sussex Bishop's Finger 3 East champions: 2012–13
