= Hove Rugby Club =

English rugby union club, based in Hove, East Sussex

(England) Hove Rugby Football Club
- Full name: Hove Rugby Club
- Union: Sussex RFU
- Founded: 1933; 93 years ago (Sussex Yeomanry); 1952; 74 years ago (Hove Rugby Club)
- Location: Hove, East Sussex, England
- Ground(s): Hove Recreation Ground, Shirley Drive, Hove, East Sussex, BN3 6NQ
- Chairman: (England) James Finlason & Dean Brackenridge
- President: (England) Adam Tunesi
- Coach(es): James Trevis (Men's Senior Head Coach); Callum Blackburn (Women's Senior Head Coach)
- Captain: (England) Ian Saunders
- League(s): Counties 1 Surrey/Sussex (Men's 1st XV); Women's Championship South East 2 (Women's 1st XV)
- 2024-25: 9th (Men's 1st XV); 9th (Women's 1st XV)

Official website
- www.hoverugbyclub.co.uk

Hove Rugby Club is an English community rugby union club, who play at Hove Recreation Ground in Shirley Drive Hove, and are affiliated to the English RFU via the Sussex RFU. They currently play in London 2 South East - a level 7 league of the English rugby union system - following their relegation from London 1 South at the end of the 2018–19 season.

== History ==
=== Beginnings ===
Territorial Army officers and men of the Sussex Yeomanry formed a rugby club, which was affiliated to the Rugby Football Union in 1933. Records of their results have been lost in the mist of time but, post war in 1945 the players reformed and continued to turn out on Saturdays, the home matches being played at East Brighton Park.

In 1952 the Yeomanry could no longer continue without an influx of new players. The members approached Alderman Arthur Brocke who was then Mayor of Hove and Councillor Jack Woolley. They secured a pitch in Hove Park and the old timber Scout Hut was refurbished and extended to provide showers, kitchen and a bar.

=== Hove Recreation Ground ===
The local Council had plans for Hove Park and the rugby Club had to plan for a move. After many false starts, the Club finally moved the short distance to Hove Recreation Ground ready for the start of the 2002–2003 season. The building of excellent new facilities and the provision of four pitches at one location gave the Club the facilities it needed to break out from the lower levels of the English structure and to enable it to look to the future.

The new Clubhouse was opened by the Mayor of Brighton and Hove in August 2002 – coincidentally, this was the Club's 50th anniversary as Hove Rugby Club.

== Current ==
Hove Men's 1st XV currently play Counties 1 Surrey/Sussex - London & SE Division

The Women's 1st XV currently play in the Women's Championship South East 2

== The Hangover Trophy ==
The Val Hayes Memorial Hangover Trophy is an annually contested fixture on New Year's Day between a Hove Rugby Club Invitation XV team and another club or invitational team. Originally the fixture was contested by Hove Rugby Club and the Robin Hood pub in Brighton, and now the fixture is sponsored by the Seafield pub.

== Alumni ==
- Simon Clarke England
- Alex King England, Barbarians, ASM Clermont Auvergne, Wasps, Rosslyn Park.
- Ollie Phillips England Sevens, Newcastle Falcons, Stade Français
- Joe El-Abd Toulon, Bristol Rugby, Caerphilly RFC Bath Rugby
- Jordan Turner-Hall England U20, Harlequins Rugby
- Noah Cato England U20, Saracens FC

== Club honours ==
Men's 1st XV:

- Sussex 1 champions (3): 1988–89, 1998–99, 2003–04
- London 2 (south-east v south-west) promotion playoff winners (2): 2009–10, 2017–18

Men's 4th XV:

- Sussex 2 champions: 2012–13
- Sussex Late Red 3 champions: 2014–15

Women's 1st XV:

- Intermediate Cup winners: 2014–2015
