= Lewes RFC =

(England) Lewes
- Full name: Lewes Rugby Football Club
- Founded: 1930; 96 years ago
- Location: Lewes, East Sussex
- Ground: Stanley Turner Ground
- Chairman: Paddy Henshaw
- League: Sussex 1
- 2019–20: 7th

Official website
- www.lewesrugby.com

Lewes Rugby Football Club, was founded in 1930 and runs several rugby teams at various ages and competitive levels, including two senior men's sides, with the 1st XV currently playing in the Sussex 1 (level 9 of the English rugby union system) following their relegation from London 3 South East at the end of the 2018–19 season. Additional the club operates two senior women's sides, with the Ladies 1st XV currently playing in the Championship 2 South East league.

View images of Lewes RFC

Lewes RFC's home ground is the Stanley Turner Ground, Lewes.

In 2008 the club working in partnership with Lewes District Council and the Sussex Rugby Football Union offered young people in the area the chance to learn and take part in Tag rugby as a means to increasing the profile of the sport in the area.

== Club honours ==
Men's

- London 3 South East champions: 1996–97
- London 2 (south-east v south-west) promotion playoff winners: 2003–04
- Sussex Spitfire 1 champions: 2015–16

Women's

- Women's Junior Cup winners: 2016–2017

== See also ==
- Lewes Priory Cricket Club
