= Crawley RFC =

(England) Crawley
- Full name: Crawley Rugby Football Club
- Founded: 1950; 75 years ago
- Location: Crawley, West Sussex
- Ground: Willoughby Fields
- Chairman: Daniel Mcgurran
- President: paul chapman
- Coach(es): Andy Evans, Simon Dean, Michael Gosling
- Captain: Kristian Dean
- League: Counties 2 Sussex

Official website
- www.crawleyrfc.com

Crawley Rugby club is an English rugby union club based in Crawley in West Sussex. The men's first XV currently compete in Counties 2 Sussex - a league at the eighth tier of the English rugby union system - following the club's promotion from Sussex 1 at the end of the 2019–20 season.

== History/Background ==
Crawley Rugby Football Club was re - founded in 1950. The club first played games at West Green Playing Fields up until 1993 when they moved to their current ground at Willoughby Fields.

On 10 April 2010 Crawley were crowned League Champions of Sussex 1 and went on to be promoted into London 3 South East. After a 2010-11 difficult season, with 5 wins out of 22 games, Crawley was relegated back to the Sussex Intermediate League with a positive outlook to restructure the club and appoint a new chairman, after it was announced that Tony Smith, who had held the position for 14 years, resigned.

As well as running a wide range of rugby clubs involving both junior and senior players, Crawley has in the past provided a home ground for the Sussex Swans Australian Rules Football team.

== Club honours ==
- Sussex 1 champions (3): 2009–10, 2016–17, 2019–20

Guinness National rugby club of the year 2019

Club awards club of the year 2023

Sussex RFU club of the hear 2023

Sussex RFU club of the year 2024

Crawley community awards team of the year 2022

Sports & recreation alliance club of the year 2023
