= Counties 4 Kent =

English Rugby Union league

- Current season or competition: 2024–25 Counties 4 Kent
- Sport: Rugby union
- Instituted: 1987; 39 years ago
- Number of teams: 10
- Country: England
- Most titles: Ashford, Aylesford Bulls, Betteshanger, Brockleians, Erith, New Ash Green, Old Gravesendians, Sittingbourne (2 titles)
- Website: englandrugby.com

Counties 4 Kent (formerly known as Kent 2 or Shepherd Neame Kent 2 for sponsorship reasons) is an English level 10 Rugby Union League and is made up of teams predominantly from south-east London and Kent. The teams play home and away matches from September through to April. Currently promoted teams move up to Counties 3 Kent Now a single division, in the past Kent 2 was divided into regional divisions - Kent 2 East and Kent 2 West. Relegated teams drop down to Counties 5 Kent. Following the RFU's Adult Competition Review, from season 2022–23 it adopted its current name Counties 4 Kent.

Each year some of the clubs in this division also take part in the RFU Junior Vase - a level 9-12 national competition.

== Teams for 2026-27 ==
Departing were Sevenoaks III and Cliffe Crusaders, promoted to Counties 3 Kent while East Peckham & Paddock Wood (10th) and King's College Hospital (11th) were relegated to Counties 5 Kent.

During the off season Rye RFC merged with St Leonards Cinque Ports RFC with the merged clubs continuing to compete in this league under the Rye name.

Team	Ground	Capacity	City/Area	Previous season
Beckenham III	Balmoral Avenue		Beckenham, London	4th
Blackheath III	Well Hall		Eltham, London	Promoted from Counties 5 Kent (champions)
Bromley II	Barnet Wood Road		Hayes, London	7th
Dartfordians II	Bourne Road		Bexley, London	8th
Faversham	Recreation Ground		Faversham, Kent	9th
New Ash Green	New Ash Green Sports Pavilion		New Ash Green, Kent	Relegated from Counties 3 Kent (11th)
Old Colfeians II	Horn Park		Lee, London	3rd
Old Elthamians II	Hospital Ground		Chislehurst, London	Promoted from Counties 5 Kent (3rd)
Rye	New Road		Rye, East Sussex	5th
Sheppey	Stupple Field		Minster, Kent	6th
Sidcup III	Crescent Farm		Sidcup, London	Promoted from Counties 5 Kent (runners-up)

Locations of the 2026-27 Counties 4 Kent teams in Greater London
Locations of the 2026-27 Counties 4 Kent teams in Kent & East Sussex

== Teams for 2025–26 ==
Departing were Canterbury III and Old Williamsonians, promoted to Counties 3 Kent while Medway III were relegated to Counties 5 Kent.

Footscray (11th in 2024–25) did not return for the new season.

Team	Ground	Capacity	City/Area	Previous season
Beckenham III	Balmoral Avenue		Beckenham, London	Promoted from Counties 5 Kent (3rd)
Bromley II	Barnet Wood Road		Hayes, London	3rd
Cliffe Crusaders	Recreation Ground		Cliffe, Kent	4th
Dartfordians II	Bourne Road		Bexley, London	6th
East Peckham & Paddock Wood	Putlands Sports & Leisure Centre		Paddock Wood, Kent	Promoted from Counties 5 Kent (champions)
Faversham	Recreation Ground		Faversham, Kent	7th
King's College Hospital	Dulwich Sports Ground		Dulwich, London	10th
Old Colfeians II	Horn Park		Lee, London	9th
Rye	New Road		Rye, East Sussex	5th
Sevenoaks III	Knole Paddock	1,000	Sevenoaks, Kent	Promoted from Counties 5 Kent (runners-up)
Sheppey	Stupple Field		Minster, Kent	8th

Locations of the 2025–26 Counties 4 Kent teams in Greater London
Locations of the 2025–26 Counties 4 Kent teams in Kent & East Sussex

== Teams for 2024–25 ==
Departing were Beckenham II, Brockleians and Old Gravesendians, all promoted to Counties 3 Kent. Sidcup III (9th) and Lordswood (12th) were relegated to Counties 5 Kent. Footscray had finished 11th and would ordinarily have been relegated but for Sidcup electing to drop down a division.

Joining were Faversham relegated from Counties 3 Kent. Bromley II, Canterbury III, Old Colfeians II, all promoted from Counties 5 Kent. Rye completed the line-up having re-joined the RFU leagues after an extended absence.

Team	Ground	Capacity	City/Area	Previous season
Bromley II	Barnet Wood Road		Hayes, London	Promoted from Counties 5 Kent (runners-up)
Canterbury III	Marine Travel Ground	1,500 (75 seats)	Canterbury, Kent	Promoted from Counties 5 Kent (champions)
Cliffe Crusaders	Recreation Ground		Cliffe, Kent	5th
Dartfordians II	Bourne Road		Bexley, London	4th
Faversham	Recreation Ground		Faversham, Kent	Relegated from Counties 3 Kent (10th)
Footscray	Footscray Playing Fields		New Eltham, London	11th
King's College Hospital	Dulwich Sports Ground		Dulwich, London	8th
Medway III	Priestfields		Rochester, Kent	10th
Old Colfeians II	Horn Park		Lee, London	Promoted from Counties 5 Kent (3rd)
Old Williamsonians	Sir Joseph Williamson's Mathematical School		Rochester, Kent	7th
Rye	New Road		Rye, East Sussex	Re-entry
Sheppey	Stupple Field		Minster, Kent	6th

Locations of the 2024–25 Counties 4 Kent teams in Greater London
Locations of the 2024–25 Counties 4 Kent teams in Kent & East Sussex

== Teams for 2023–24 ==
Departing were Tonbridge Juddians III and Sittingbourne promoted to Counties 3 Kent. Four clubs Beccehamian II (11th), Greenwich (12th) and Askeans (14th) were relegated to Counties 5 Kent. Weavering Warriors (13th) elected to drop into the Kent RFU merit leagues.

Joining were King's College Hospital and Footscray, both relegated from Counties 3 Kent, together with Beckenham II and Medway III

Team	Ground	Capacity	City/Area	Previous season
Beckenham II	Balmoral Avenue		Beckenham, London	
Brockleians	Civil Service Sports Ground		Eltham, London	4th
Cliffe Crusaders	Recreation Ground		Cliffe, Kent	3rd
Dartfordians II	Bourne Road		Bexley, London	7th
Footscray	Footscray Playing Fields		New Eltham, London	Relegated from Counties 3 Kent
King's College Hospital	Dulwich Sports Ground		Dulwich, London	Relegated from Counties 3 Kent
Lordswood	Lordswood Sports & Social Club		Chatham, Kent	9th
Medway III	Priestfields		Rochester, Kent	
Old Gravesendians	Fleetway Sports Ground		Gravesend, Kent	8th
Old Williamsonians	Sir Joseph Williamson's Mathematical School		Rochester, Kent	6th
Sheppey	Stupple Field		Minster, Kent	5th
Sidcup III	Crescent Farm		Sidcup, Kent	10th

Locations of the 2023–24 Counties 4 Kent teams in Greater London
Locations of the 2023–24 Counties 4 Kent teams in Kent

== Teams for 2022–23 ==
This was the first season following the RFU Adult Competition Review with the league adopting its new name of Counties 4 Kent.

Returning were 7 of the 9 teams who competed in the previous season's league.

Departing were Dartford Valley and Whitstable, promoted to Counties 3 Kent. There was no relegation.

Joining from Kent 1 were Brockleians, Cliffe Crusaders and Old Willamsonians. The league was supplemented by the addition of Tonbridge Juddians III, Beccehamian II, Dartfordians II and Sidcup III.

Team	Ground	Capacity	City/Area	Previous season
Askeans	Rectory Field	3,500 (500 seats)	Blackheath, London	9th
Beccehamian II	Sparrow's Den		West Wickham, London	New entry
Brockleians	Civil Service Sports Ground		Eltham, London	Relegated from Kent 1 (9th)
Cliffe Crusaders	Recreation Ground		Cliffe, Kent	Joined from Kent 1 (7th)
Dartfordians II	Bourne Road		Bexley, London	New entry
Greenwich	Plumstead Common		Plumstead, London	8th
Lordswood	Lordswood Sports & Social Club		Chatham, Kent	7th
Old Gravesendians	Fleetway Sports Ground		Gravesend, Kent	4th
Old Williamsonians	Sir Joseph Williamson's Mathematical School		Rochester, Kent	Joined from Kent 1 (3rd)
Sheppey	Stupple Field		Minster, Kent	5th
Sidcup III	Crescent Farm		Sidcup, Kent	New entry
Sittingbourne	Gore Court Cricket Club		Sittingbourne, Kent	3rd
Tonbridge Juddians III	The Slade	1,500	Tonbridge, Kent	New entry
Weavering Warriors	Bicknor Road		Maidstone, Kent	6th

Locations of the 2022–23 Counties 4 Kent teams in Greater London
Locations of the 2022–23 Counties 4 Kent teams in Kent

== Teams for 2021–22 ==
The teams competing in 2021–22 achieved their places in the league based on performances in 2019–20, the 'previous season' column in the table below refers to that season not 2020–21.

Bexley, who finished 8th in 2019–20, played several of the early fixtures but withdrew from the league in November 2021.

Swanley RFC, a new entry, competed until January 2022 before withdrawing from the league.

Team	Ground	Capacity	City/Area	Previous season
Askeans	Rectory Field	3,500 (500 seats)	Blackheath, London	10th
Dartford Valley	Leigh Academy		Dartford, Kent	3rd
Greenwich	Plumstead Common		Plumstead, London	9th
Lordswood	Lordswood Sports & Social Club		Chatham, Kent	5th
Old Gravesendians	Fleetway Sports Ground		Gravesend, Kent	Relegated from Kent 1 (9th)
Sheppey	Stupple Field		Minster, Kent	7th
Sittingbourne	Gore Court Cricket Club		Sittingbourne, Kent	4th
Swanley	Swanley Recreation Ground		Swanley, Kent	New entry
Weavering Warriors	Bicknor Road		Maidstone, Kent	6th
Whitstable	Reeves Way		Chestfield, Kent	Relegated from Kent 1 (10th)

Locations of the 2021–22 Shepherd Neame Kent 2 teams in Greater London
Locations of the 2021–22 Shepherd Neame Kent 2 teams in Kent

== Season 2020–21 ==
On 30 October 2020 the RFU announced that due to the coronavirus pandemic a decision had been taken to cancel Adult Competitive Leagues (National League 1 and below) for the 2020/21 season meaning Kent 2 was not contested.

== Teams for 2019–20 ==
Team	Ground	Capacity	City/Area	Previous season
Askeans	Well Hall	1,650 (550 seats)	Eltham, London	9th
Bexley	Bexley Park		Dartford, Kent	6th
Brockleians	Civil Service Sports Ground		Eltham, London	5th
Dartford Valley	Leigh Academy		Dartford, Kent	7th
Footscray	Footscray Playing Fields		New Eltham, London	Relegated from Kent 1 (10th)
Greenwich	Plumstead Common		Plumstead, London	8th
Lordswood	Lordswood Sports & Social Club		Chatham, Kent	3rd
Hastings & Bexhill	William Parker Lower School		Hastings, East Sussex	
Sheppey	Stupple Field		Minster, Kent	Relegated from Kent 1 (11th)
Sittingbourne	Gore Court Cricket Club		Sittingbourne, Kent	4th
Weavering Warriors	Bicknor Road		Maidstone, Kent	N/A

Locations of the 2019–20 Shepherd Neame Kent 2 teams in Greater London
Locations of the 2019–20 Shepherd Neame Kent 2 teams in Kent

== Teams for 2018-19 ==
Team	Ground	Capacity	City/Area	Previous season
Askeans	Well Hall	1,650 (550 seats)	Eltham, London	8th
Bexley	Bexley Park		Dartford, Kent	5th
Brockleians	Civil Service Sports Ground		Eltham, London	3rd
Cliffe Crusaders	Recreation Ground		Cliffe, Kent	Kent Merit Leagues (runners up)
Dartford Valley	Leigh Academy		Dartford, Kent	7th
Faversham	Recreation Ground		Faversham, Kent	6th
Greenwich	Plumstead Common		Plumstead, London	9th
Lordswood	Lordswood Sports & Social Club		Chatham, Kent	4th
Sittingbourne	Gore Court Cricket Club		Sittingbourne, Kent	Relegated from Kent 1 (12th)

Locations of the 2018-19 Shepherd Neame Kent 2 teams in Greater London
Locations of the 2018-19 Shepherd Neame Kent 2 teams in Kent

== Teams for 2017-18 ==
Team	Ground	Capacity	City/Area	Previous season
Askeans	Well Hall	1,650 (550 seats)	Eltham, London	8th
Bexley	Bexley Park		Dartford, Kent	10th
Brockleians	Civil Service Sports Ground		Eltham, London	Relegated from Kent 1 (11th)
Dartford Valley	Leigh Academy		Dartford, Kent	9th
Faversham	Recreation Ground		Faversham, Kent	7th
Footscray	Footscray Playing Fields		New Eltham, London	4th
Greenwich	Plumstead Common		Plumstead, London	11th
Lordswood	Lordswood Sports & Social Club		Chatham, Kent	5th
Whitstable	Reeves Way		Chestfield, Kent	3rd

Locations of the 2017-18 Shepherd Neame Kent 2 teams in Greater London
Locations of the 2017-18 Shepherd Neame Kent 2 teams in Kent

== Teams for 2016-17 ==
- Askean
- Bexley
- Dartford Valley
- Edenbridge
- Erith
- Faversham
- Footscray
- Greenwich
- Lordswood (relegated from Kent 1)
- Old Gravsesendians (relegated from Kent 1)
- Orpington
- Royal Bank of Scotland
- Shooters Hill
- Whitstable

== Teams for 2015–16 ==
- Askean
- Bexley (relegated from Kent 1)
- Dartford Valley
- Edenbridge
- Faversham
- Footscray
- Greenwich
- Orpington
- Shooters Hill
- Sittingbourne (relegated from Kent 1)
- Snowdown C.W.
- Whitstable

== Teams for 2014–15 ==
- Askean
- Brockleians
- Dartford Valley
- Edenbridge
- Faversham
- Footscray (relegated from Kent 1)
- Greenwich
- New Ash Green
- Orpington
- Shooters Hill (relegated from Kent 1)

== Teams for 2013–14 ==
- Ash
- Askean
- Bexley
- Brockleians
- Dartford Valley (www.dvrfc.com)
- Edenbridge
- Faversham
- Guy's Hospital
- Lordswood
- New Ash Green
- Orpington
- Whitstable

== Teams for 2009–10 ==
- Askean
- Bexley
- Brockleians
- Footscray
- Kings Coll. Hospital
- Lordswood
- New Ash Green
- Old Williamsonians
- Orpington
- Shooters Hill

== Original teams ==
When league rugby began in 1987 this division contained the following teams:

- Ashford
- Betteshanger (Note: Betteshanger merged with Deal Wanderers RFC in 2006 to become Deal & Betteshanger Rugby Club.)
- Dover
- Folkestone
- Greenwich
- Lloyds Bank
- Met Police Hayes
- Midland Bank
- Orpington
- Snowdown C.W.
- Thames Polytechnic

== Kent 2 honours ==
=== Kent 2 (1987–1993) ===
he original Kent 2 was a tier 9 league with promotion up to Kent 1 and relegation down to Kent 3.

Kent 2
Season	No of Teams	Champions	Runners–up	Relegated Teams
1987–88	11	Betteshanger	Snowdown C.W.	Orpington, Met Police Hayes, Thames Polytechnic
1988–89	11	Sevenoaks	Dover	Lloyds Bank, Greenwich
1989–90	11	Sittingbourne	Met Police Hayes	Midland Bank
1990–91	11	Tonbridge	Sheppey	Linton, Cranbrook, NatWest Bank
1991–92	11	Canterbury	Snowdown C.W. (Note: 3rd place New Ash Green and 4th place Met Police Hayes were also promoted due to Kent league restructuring.)	No relegation (Note: Kent league restructuring meant that there was no relegation.)
1992–93	13	Thames Polytechnic	NatWest Bank	Old Gravesendians, Linton
Green backgrounds are promotion places.

=== Kent 2 (1993–1996) ===
The creation of National 5 South meant that Kent 2 dropped from a tier 9 league to a tier 10 league for the years that National 5 South was active. Promotion and relegation continued to Kent 1 and Kent 3 respectively.

Kent 2
Season	No of Teams	Champions	Runners–up	Relegated Teams
1993–94	13	Old Shootershillians	Old Elthamians	Lloyds Bank, Tonbridge, Bexley
1994–95	13	Ashford	Dover	Midland Bank, New Ash Green
1995–96	13	Betteshanger	Cranbrook	Vigo
Green backgrounds are promotion places.

=== Kent 2 (1996–1998) ===
The cancellation of National 5 South at the end of the 1995–96 season meant that Kent 2 reverted to being a tier 9 league. Promotion continued to Kent 1 and Kent 3 respectively.

Kent 2
Season	No of Teams	Champions	Runners–up	Relegated Teams
1996–97	13	Folkestone	Whitstable (Note: Seven teams were promoted from the division due to Kent league restructuring, including Snowdown C.W., Deal Wanderers, NatWest Bank, Sittingbourne and Lordswood.)	No relegation (Note: Kent league restructuring meant that there was no relegation.)
1997–98	14	Midland Bank	Tonbridge	No relegation (Note: Kent league restructuring meant that there was no relegation.)
Green backgrounds are promotion places.

=== Kent 2 East / West (1998–2000) ===
The cancellation of Kent 3 ahead of the 1997–98 season saw Kent 2 restructured into two regional division - Kent 2 East and Kent 2 West - both of which were tier 9 leagues. Promotion continued to Kent 1 and there was no relegation until Kent 3 was reintroduced.

Kent 2: East / West
Season	No of Teams	Champions	Runners–up	Relegated Teams	League Name
1998–99	14	New Ash Green	Old Elthamians	No relegation	Kent 2 East
1998–99	4	Greenwich	Dartford Valley	No relegation	Kent 2 West
1999–00	8	Aylesford Bulls (Note: Aylesford Bulls were not promoted this season but instead remained in a new look single division along with runners up Sittingbourne and relegated teams from Kent 1.)	Sittingbourne	Multiple teams (Note: Due to the creation of a single division for Kent 2 as well as two new lower divisions there were many relegations this season. Faversham, Vigo, Old Williamsonians joined Kent 4 while Deal & Betteshanger, Old Gravesendians, Edenbridge joined Kent 3.)	Kent 2 East
1999–00	9 (Note: Multiple teams were transferred from Kent 2 East for this season - previously only 4 teams in division.)	Erith (Note: Erith were not promoted this season but instead remained in a new look single division along with runners up Dartford Valley and relegated teams from Kent 1.)	Dartford Valley	Multiple teams (Note: Due to the creation of a single division for Kent 2 as well as two new lower divisions there were many relegations this season. Footscray, Bexley and Greenwich joined Kent 3 while Orpington and Old Olavians joined Kent 4. Greenwich Academical and Met Police Hayes would drop out of the league for the following season.)	Kent 2 West
Green backgrounds are promotion places.

=== Kent 2 (2000–2009) ===
Kent 2 was restructured back into a single division for the 2000–01 season, although the introduction of London 4 South East meant that it fell to become a tier 10 league. Promotion continued to Kent 1, while the reintroduction of Kent 3 meant that there was relegation until this league was cancelled at the end of the 2007–08 season.

Kent 2
Season	No of Teams	Champions	Runners–up	Relegated Teams
2000–01	9	Ashford	Erith	No relegation (Note: No relegation as Kent 4 abolished at end of season and subsequent league restructuring led to division increasing to 10 teams.)
2001–02	10	Aylesford Bulls	Sheppey	Dartford Valley, HSBC, Dover
2002–03	10	Old Elthamians	Sittingbourne	Brockleians, Bexley
2003–04	9	Park House	Dover	No relegation (Note: No relegation as division would increase to 10 teams the following season.)
2004–05	10	Brockleians	New Ash Green	Dartford Valley
2005–06	9	Old Gravesendians	Sheppey	Medway, Bexley
2006–07	8	Erith	Old Olavians	New Ash Green, Orpington, Shooters Hill
2007–08	8	Medway	Cranbrook (Note: Vigo and Sheppey were also promoted along with champions Medway and runners up Cranbrook.)	No relegation (Note: No relegation as Kent 3 abolished at the end of the season.)
2008–09	10 (Note: Division increased to 10 teams due to Kent 3 being abolished the previous season.)	HSBC	Guy's King's & St Thomas' Hospital	No relegation
Green backgrounds are promotion places.

=== Kent 2 (2009–present) ===
Kent 2 remained a tier 10 league despite national restructuring by the RFU. Promotion continued to Kent 1 and there was no relegation.

Kent 2
Season	No of Teams	Champions	Runners–up	Relegated Teams
2009–10	10	Lordswood	New Ash Green	No relegation
2010–11	11	Guy's King's & St Thomas' Hospital	Shooters Hill	No relegation
2011–12	9	King's College Hospital	Southwark Lancers	No relegation
2012–13	11	Old Williamsonians	Footscray	No relegation
2013–14	10	Bexley	Lordswood	No relegation
2014–15	10	New Ash Green	Brockleians	No relegation
2015–16	12	Sittingbourne	Snowdown C.W.	No relegation
2016–17	13	Old Gravesendians	Royal Bank of Scotland	No relegation
2017–18	9	Whitstable	Footscray	No relegation
2018–19	9	Cliffe Crusaders	Faversham	No relegation
2019–20	10	Brockleians	Footscray	No relegation
2020–21	10			No relegation
Green backgrounds are promotion places.

== Number of league titles ==
- Ashford (2)
- Aylesford Bulls (2)
- Betteshanger (2)
- Brockleians (2)
- Erith (2)
- New Ash Green (2)
- Old Gravesendians (2)
- Sittingbourne (2)
- Bexley (1)
- Canterbury (1)
- Cliffe Crusaders (1)
- Folkestone (1)
- Greenwich (1)
- Guy's King's & St Thomas' Hospital (1)
- HSBC (1)
- King's College Hospital (1)
- Lordswood (1)
- Medway (1)
- Midland Bank (1)
- New Ash Green (1)
- Old Elthamians (1)
- Old Shootershillians (1)
- Old Williamsonians (1)
- Park House (1)
- Sevenoaks (1)
- Thames Polytechnic (1)
- Tonbridge (1)
- Whitstable (1)

== See also ==
- London & SE Division RFU
- Kent RFU
- English rugby union system
- Rugby union in England
