= John Moll =

John Moll may refer to:

- John L. Moll, American electrical engineer
- John Selwyn Moll, English banker, British Army officer and rugby union player
