= Counties 5 Kent =

English rugby union league

- Sport: Rugby Union
- Instituted: 1987; 39 years ago
- Most titles: Midland Bank (2 titles)

Counties 5 Kent (formerly Kent 3) is an English Rugby Union league that is the lowest RFU league for clubs in south-east London and Kent. Promoted teams go up to Counties 4 Kent and relegation is to the Kent RFU merit leagues.

Dwindling numbers of teams meant that Kent 3 folded at the end of the 2007–08 season, with all sides automatically promoted to what was then Kent 2. However, following a 15 year hiatus, and after the RFU's Adult Competition Review in 2022 - and the decision by Kent Rugby to allow reserve teams to participate in county leagues - from season 2023–24 it was resurrected and adopted its current name Counties 5 Kent.

== 2026-27 ==
Departing were Blackheath III, Sidcup III and Old Elthamians II, all promoted to Counties 4 Kent. Bromley III (10th) and Medway III (11th) were relegated to the Kent reserve leagues.

Team	Ground	Capacity	City/Area	Previous season
Askeans	Rectory Field	6,000	Blackheath, London	5th
Beccehamian II	Sparrow's Den		West Wickham, London	8th
East Peckham & Paddock Wood	Putlands Sports & Leisure Centre		Paddock Wood, Kent	Relegated from Counties 4 Kent (10th)
Edenbridge	Coomb Field		Edenbridge, Kent	4th
King's College Hospital	Dulwich Sports Ground		Dulwich, London	Relegated from Counties 4 Kent (11th)
Lordswood	Lordswood Sports & Social Club		Chatham, Kent	7th
Old Alleynians III	The Common		Dulwich, London	6th
Park House II	Barnet Wood Road		Hayes, London	9th
Weavering Warriors	Bicknor Road		Maidstone, Kent	Re-entry
Westcombe Park III	Goddington Dene	3,200 (200 seats)	Orpington, London	New entry

Locations of the 2026-27 Counties 5 Kent teams in Greater London
Locations of the 2026-27 Counties 5 Kent teams in Kent

== 2025–26 ==
Departing were East Peckham & Paddock Wood, Sevenoaks III and Beckenham III, all promoted to Counties 4 Kent.

Ashford II (11th) did not return for the new season.

Greenwich (10th in 2024-25) withdrew from the league in early 2026 leaving 11 clubs to contest the outstanding fixtures.

Team	Ground	Capacity	City/Area	Previous season
Askeans	Rectory Field	6,000	Blackheath, London	6th
Beccehamian II	Sparrow's Den		West Wickham, London	8th
Blackheath III	Well Hall		Eltham, London	New entry
Bromley III	Barnet Wood Road		Hayes, London	New entry
Edenbridge	Coomb Field		Edenbridge, Kent	Re-entry
Lordswood	Lordswood Sports & Social Club		Chatham, Kent	5th
Medway III	Priestfields		Rochester, Kent	Relegated from Counties 4 Kent (12th)
Old Alleynians III	The Common		Dulwich, London	4th
Old Elthamians II	Hospital Ground		Chislehurst, London	New entry
Park House II	Barnet Wood Road		Hayes, London	9th
Sidcup III	Crescent Farm		Sidcup, London	7th

Locations of the 2025-26 Counties 5 Kent teams in Greater London
Locations of the 2025-26 Counties 5 Kent teams in Kent

== 2024–25 ==
Departing were Canterbury III, Bromley II and Old Colfeians II, all promoted to Counties 4 Kent.

Joining were Lordswood, relegated from Counties 4 Kent and Sidcup III who finished 9th in Counties 4 Kent but elected to be relegated and in doing so gave Footscray (11th) a reprieve in the league above. New entries to the league were Beckenham III, Park House II, Old Alleynians III and East Peckham & Paddock Wood.

Team	Ground	Capacity	City/Area	Previous season
Ashford II	Kinney's Field		Ashford, Kent	6th
Askeans	Rectory Field	6,000	Blackheath, London	5th
Beccehamian II	Sparrow's Den		West Wickham, London	7th
Beckenham III	Balmoral Avenue		Beckenham, London	New entry
East Peckham & Paddock Wood	Putlands Sports & Leisure Centre		Paddock Wood, Kent	New entry
Greenwich	Plumstead Common		Plumstead, London	8th
Lordswood	Lordswood Sports & Social Club		Chatham, Kent	Relegated from Counties 4 Kent (12th)
Old Alleynians III	The Common		Dulwich, London	New entry
Park House II	Barnet Wood Road		Hayes, London	New entry
Sevenoaks III	Knole Paddock	1,000	Sevenoaks, Kent	4th
Sidcup III	Crescent Farm		Sidcup, London	Requested drop Counties 4 Kent (9th)

Locations of the 2024-25 Counties 5 Kent teams in Greater London
Locations of the 2024-25 Counties 5 Kent teams in Kent

== 2023–24 ==
Team	Ground	Capacity	City/Area	Previous season
Ashford II	Kinney's Field		Ashford, Kent	New entry
Askeans	Rectory Field	6,000	Blackheath, London	Relegated from Counties 4 Kent (13th)
Beccehamian II	Sparrow's Den		West Wickham, London	Relegated from Counties 4 Kent (11th)
Bromley II	Barnet Wood Road		Hayes, London	New entry
Canterbury III	Marine Travel Ground	1,500 (75 seats)	Canterbury, Kent	New entry
Greenwich	Plumstead Common		Plumstead, London	Relegated from Counties 4 Kent (12th)
Old Colfeians II	Horn Park		Lee, London	New entry
Sevenoaks III	Knole Paddock	1,000	Sevenoaks, Kent	New entry

Locations of the 2023-24 Counties 5 Kent teams in Greater London
Locations of the 2023-24 Counties 5 Kent teams in Kent

== 2008–2023 ==
League not contested

== Original teams ==
When league rugby began in 1987 this division contained the following teams:

- Bexley
- Cranbrook
- Deal Wanderers (Note: Deal Wanderers RFC would later merge with Betteshanger RFC in 2006 to form Deal & Betteshanger Rugby Club.)
- Linton (Note: Now known as Aylesford Bulls RFC.)
- New Ash Green
- Old Gravesendians
- Sheppey
- Sittingbourne
- Vigo

== Kent 3 honours ==
Kent 3 Honours
Season	No of Teams	Champions	Runners–up	Relegated Teams	League Name
1987–88	9	New Ash Green	Linton	Bexley	Kent 3
1988–89	11	Met Police Hayes	Sittingbourne	Orpington, Thames Polytechnic	Kent 3
1989–90	11	Sheppey	Cranbrook	Darenth Valley	Kent 3
1990–91	11	Midland Bank	Vigo	Footscray, Orpington	Kent 3
1991–92	12	Thames Polytechnic	NatWest Bank (Note: Restructuring of the Kent leagues meant that the top six clubs were promoted from Kent 3 including Deal Wanderers, Bexley, Linton and Old Gravesendians.)	No relegation (Note: Restructuring of the Kent leagues meant there was no relegation.)	Kent 3
1992–93	10	Cranbrook	Lloyds Bank	Greenwich, Old Olavians	Kent 3
1993–94	10	Old Gravesendians	Whitstable	Orpington, Footscray (Note: 8th place Kent Police would drop out of the league at the end of the season.)	Kent 3
1994–95	10	Lordswood	Old Williamsonians	Lloyds Bank, Greenwich	Kent 3
1995–96	10	Tonbridge	New Ash Green	Darenth Valley	Kent 3
1996–97	10	Midland Bank	New Ash Green (Note: Due to Kent league restructuring, the top nine teams were promoted from Kent 3.)	No relegation (Note: Kent league restructuring meant there was no relegation - with bottom side Canterbury Exiles the only team to remain in the division for the following season.)	Kent 3
1997–98	6	Erith (Note: The cancellation of Kent 3 and Kent 4 and restructuring of Kent 2 for the following season meant that champions Erith would be promoted to the new regional Kent 2 East division.)	Faversham (Note: The cancellation of Kent 3 and Kent 4 and restructuring of Kent 2 meant that runners up Faversham would also be promoted to the new Kent 2 East division while 3rd place Greenwich would go into Kent 2 South West. 4th place Darenth Valley would fold at the end of the season but would reform as Dartford Valley RFC in Kent 2 West.)	No relegation (Note: The cancellation of Kent 4 meant that there was no relegation - bottom two sides Meopham and Canterbury Exiles would drop out of the leagues.)	Kent 3
1998–99	No Competition				
1999–00	No Competition				
2000–01	6	Bexley	Old Gravesendians	No relegation (Note: No relegation as Kent 4 abolished at the end of the season.)	Kent 3
2001–02	11	Shooters Hill	Old Olavians	No relegation	Kent 3
2002–03	10	Vigo	Dover	No relegation	Kent 3
2003–04	11	Brockleians	Bexley (Note: 3rd place Dartford Valley were also promoted.)	No relegation	Kent 3
2004–05	9	Deal & Betteshanger	HSBC	No relegation	Kent 3
2005–06	8	Orpington	Foots Cray	No relegation	Kent 3
2006–07	6	Medway	Bexley	No relegation	Kent 3
2007–08	5	Old Williamsonians	Orpington (Note: As this was the final season of Kent 3 all teams in the division were automatically promoted to Kent 2.)	No relegation	Kent 3
Green backgrounds are promotion places.

== Number of league titles ==
- Midland Bank (2)
- Bexley (1)
- Brockleians (1)
- Cranbrook (1)
- Deal & Betteshanger (1)
- Erith (1)
- Lordswood (1)
- Medway (1)
- Met Police Hayes (1)
- New Ash Green (1)
- Old Gravesendians (1)
- Old Williamsonians (1)
- Orpington (1)
- Sheppey (1)
- Shooters Hill (1)
- Thames Polytechnic (1)
- Tonbridge (1)
- Vigo (1)

== See also ==
- London & SE Division RFU
- Kent RFU
- English rugby union system
- Rugby union in England
