= John Selwyn =

John Selwyn may refer to:

- John Selwyn (1688–1751), English army officer and Member of Parliament
- John Selwyn (c. 1709–51), son of the preceding, English Member of Parliament
- John Selwyn (bishop) (1844–98), Anglican Bishop of Melanesia
- John Selwyn Moll (1913-1942), English rugby union player
