= Deal & Betteshanger Rugby Club =

English rugby union club, based in Deal, Kent

(England) Deal and Betteshanger "Lions" RFC
- Full name: Deal and Betteshanger Rugby Football Club
- Union: Kent RFU
- Founded: 2006; 20 years ago
- Location: Deal, Kent, England
- Ground(s): The Drill Field, Deal
- Chairman: Matthew Curd
- President: Robbie Scully
- Coach: Mal Graves
- Captain: Sam Hanley
- League: Counties 1 Kent
- 2024–25: 9th

Official website
- www.dealandbettesrfc.org.uk

== Betteshanger history ==
Rugby was first played at Betteshanger (The Colliers) in 1936, and was disbanded in 1939 at the outbreak of World War II. The club reformed in season 1948–49 when the Yorkshire and Lancashire rugby league enthusiasts combined with the Welsh exiles. The Colliers were highly respected throughout their 57-year history winning county 7’s championship twice, as well as Kent 2, Kent 1 and London Div.4 SE.

== Deal Wanderers history ==
Deal Wanderers started life as Walmer Wanderers in season 1958–59. The change of name came in season 1960–61 when it separated from the cricket section. Wanderers won Kent Div.3 in the 2004–05.

== Deal & Betteshanger history ==
Following closure of Betteshanger Colliery and the RM barracks both clubs found themselves competing for an ever-decreasing pool of players and in 2004 the two clubs engaged in discussion about amalgamation. Although they had very different backgrounds and histories the joining of the clubs was the right decision and in 2006 Deal and Betteshanger Lions RFC was born, and has proved very successful.

The club is one of the very few sides at Level 7 that play predominantly home grown talent blended with a few players that have moved into the area. The club endeavours to field three regular senior sides. The club also has a mini’s and junior section where children aged 6 to 17 are coached. Deal and Betteshanger was one of the first rugby clubs in East Kent to be awarded the coveted “Seal of Approval”.

== Royal Marines School of Music barracks bombing ==
The rugby club had a strong association with the Royal Marines School of Music, then barracked in Walmer, and the tragic IRA bombing in 1989 killed eleven students, several of whom played for the Wanderers. The community of Deal & Walmer was distraught and in commemoration of that day, an annual rugby match takes place, alternately hosted by the Lions at The Drill Field and by the Royal Marines Band Service in Portsmouth.

== Junior rugby ==
The club runs a thriving youth section, made up of a minis with age groups from 6 to 11 year olds and juniors with age groups from 12 to 17 years old. Training and matches take place on Sunday mornings from 10.00am

== Saracens partnership ==
From the start of the 2015–16 Deal & Betteshanger rugby club have become a partner club with Saracens. Saracens provide club visits as well as lectures and pro sessions along with providing an opportunity for youth players to take part in fixtures at Allianz Park Stadium on the 4G pitch itself, while the crowd builds for the game.

== CBRE All Schools Partnership ==
For the start of the 2016–17 Deal & Betteshanger rugby club are part of the CBRE All Schools Partnership, along with Deal School Goodwin Academy. The rugby club provides the ground for training and any matches which the school take part in. The Deal & Betteshanger club logo is shown on the school rugby shirts.

== Club alumni ==
Several players have come through the junior section at Deal & Betteshanger and moved into professional positions within rugby. These include Matthew Carley, a professional RFU referee, Danny Herriott who played for England U20s and Northampton Saints, Ross Widdett who played for 2022 Mid-American RFU (MARFU) winners St Louis Bombers and Archie English who went to Hartpury College, represented Kent.

== Honours ==
- Kent 2 champions (2): 1987–88, 1995–96 (Note: Kent 2 titles were won by parent club Betteshanger.)
- London 4 South East champions: 2001–02 (Note: London 4 South East title was won by parent club Betteshanger.)
- Kent 3 champions: 2004–05
- Kent Plate winners: 2009
