= Matthew Carley =

English rugby union referee & former player

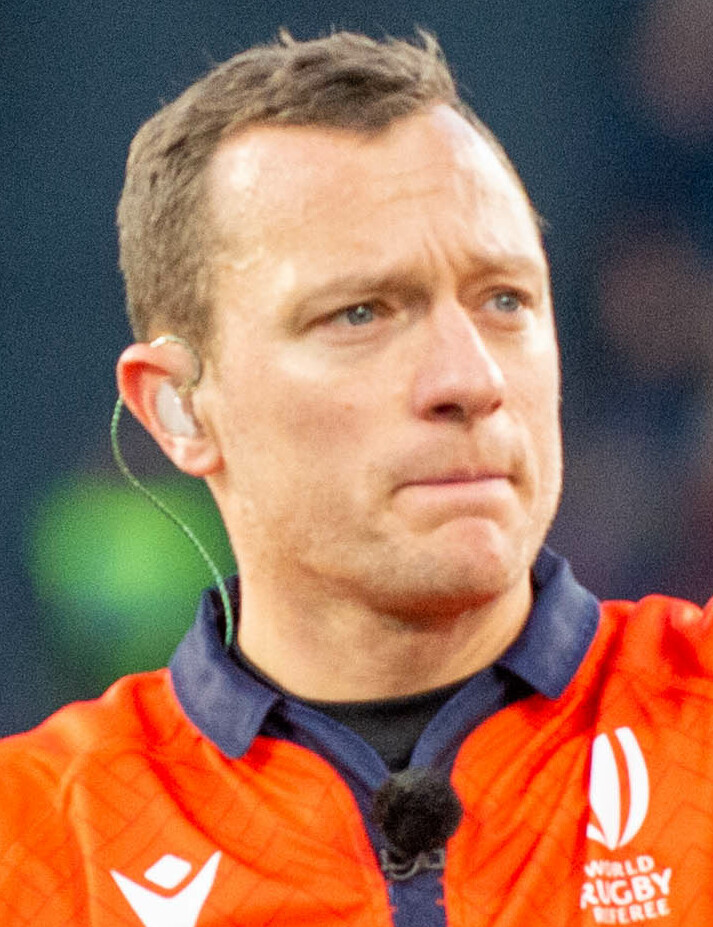
- Carley in 2023
- Born: Matthew Carley; 21 December 1984 (age 41) Deal, England
- Occupation: Referee

Rugby union career
Refereeing career
| Years | Competition | Apps |
| 2013- | RFU Premiership | |
| 2013- | Anglo-Welsh Cup | |
| 2013- | European Challenge Cup | |
| 2015- | European Champions Cup | |
| 2015- | Test matches | |
- Correct as of 31 March 2017

Matthew Carley (born 21 December 1984) is an English rugby union referee representing the Rugby Football Union. He is a regular referee in the English Premiership and has refereed games at European level.

== Refereeing career ==
Started playing rugby at Deal & Betteshanger Rugby Club. Carley started refereeing at the age of 16, taking charge of Aylesford 3rds v Maidstone 4ths where he was obliged to give his first yellow card to the Maidstone prop, Rob Lindsay, following Lindsay punching a member of the opposite team. In September 2004 he was first person to be offered a RFU refereeing scholarship at the University of Gloucestershire, which ran alongside his sports science degree. After graduating, he returned home and joined the RFU's South East Group of referees ahead of the 2008–09 season. In 2010, Carley was promoted to the National Panel of Referees where he started to referee at National 1 and 2 level and Championship. That same year, he debuted on the World Sevens Series in Dubai.

During the 2012–13 RFU Championship, Carley became the first ever referee in the world to officiate a professional game wearing "RefCam" when he took charge of the Newcastle Falcons and London Scottish. On 4 May 2013, he officiated his first Premiership game, taking charge of London Welsh and Worcester Warriors. Carley later became the first referee to gain promotion from the Referee Academy into a full-time referee.

Three months into his first season at premiership level, Carley made his European debut taking charge of Cavalieri Prato home game against Lusitanos XV during the 2013–14 European Challenge Cup. In November 2014, Carley had his first taste of international rugby when he took charge of a RFU Championship XV against Canada. Several months later he officiated his first international, Portugal v Spain in the European Nations Cup. During the 2015/16 season, Carley became a regular referee at Premiership level and debuted in the European Rugby Champions Cup refereeing Munster against Benetton Treviso. That same season, he took charge of a 2015–16 European Rugby Challenge Cup quarter final and the second leg of the 2015–16 RFU Championship final.

He took charge of his first World Rugby appointed match, refereeing the United States against Russia in June 2016. In November 2016, he refereed his first Tier 1 nation, officiating Scotland's clash against Georgia. During the 2017 Six Nations Championship, he made his first Six Nations appearance, acting as assistant referee to John Lacey during Scotland's game against Wales and subsequently has taken charge of his first Tier 1 International Test match at Murrayfield Stadium refereeing Scotland Vs New Zealand on 18 November 2017. In 2019, Carley was appointed to the 2019 Rugby World Cup as an assistant referee and referee of the 2023 Rugby World Cup.

In 2024, Carley was appointed as the referee for the Investec Champions Cup Final between Leinster Rugby and Stade Toulousain at the Tottenham Hotspur Stadium.
