= Counties 1 Kent =

English Rugby Union Regional League

- Current season or competition: 2025–26 Counties 1 Kent
- Sport: Rugby union
- Number of teams: 12
- Country: England
- Holders: Canterbury Pilgrims (2024–25)
- Most titles: Canterbury Pilgrims (2 titles)

Counties 1 Kent is an English level 7 rugby union regional league for rugby clubs in London and the south-east of England including sides from Kent, Greater London and East Sussex. Administration of the leagues is divided between Kent Rugby, Sussex Rugby and the London & SE RFU. (The locations in Greater London are all in areas that were historically part of Kent.)

The current champions are Canterbury Pilgrims.

== Structure and format ==
The twelve teams play home and away matches from September through to April, making a total of twenty-two matches each. The results of the matches contribute points to the league as follows:

- 4 points are awarded for a win.
- 2 points are awarded for a draw.
- 0 points are awarded for a loss.

In addition:

- 1 losing (bonus) point is awarded to a team that loses a match by 7 points or fewer
- 1 additional (bonus) point is awarded to a team scoring 4 tries or more in a match

Promotion is to Regional 2 South East and relegation is to either Counties 2 Kent or Counties 2 Sussex depending on location.

== 2026–27 ==
Departing were Old Elthamians promoted to Regional 2 South East whilst Cranbrook (11th) and Charlton Park (12th) were relegated to Counties 2 Kent.

| Team | Ground | Capacity | City/Area | Previous season |
|---|---|---|---|---|
| Ashford | Kinney's Field | | Ashford, Kent | 5th |
| Beccehamian | Sparrow's Den | | West Wickham, London | 8th |
| Canterbury II | Marine Travel Ground | | Canterbury, Kent | Relegated from Regional 2 South East (11th) |
| Crowborough | Steel Cross | | Crowborough, East Sussex | 7th |
| Deal & Betteshanger | The Drill Field | | Deal, Kent | Runners-up |
| Dover | Crabble Athletic Ground | | Dover, Kent | 6th |
| Gillingham Anchorians | Darland Banks | | Gillingham, Kent | 9th |
| Heathfield & Waldron | Hardy Roberts Recreational Ground | | Cross In Hand, Heathfield, East Sussex | 3rd |
| Park House | Barnet Wood Road | | Hayes, London | 10th |
| Sevenoaks II | Knole Paddock | 1,000 | Sevenoaks, Kent | 4th |
| Thanet Wanderers | St Peter's Recreation Ground | | Broadstairs, Kent | Promoted from Counties 2 Kent (runners-up) |
| Tonbridge Juddians II | The Slade | 1,500 | Tonbridge, Kent | Promoted from Counties 2 Kent (champions) |

Locations of the 2026–27 Counties 1 Kent teams in London
Locations of the 2026-27 Counties 1 Kent teams in Kent and East Sussex

== 2025–26 ==
Departing were Canterbury II and Bromley, both promoted to Regional 2 South East.

| Team | Ground | Capacity | City/Area | Previous season |
|---|---|---|---|---|
| Ashford | Kinney's Field | | Ashford, Kent | 10th |
| Beccehamian | Sparrow's Den | | West Wickham, London | 5th |
| Charlton Park | Broad Walk | | Kidbrooke, London | 12th |
| Cranbrook | Tomlin Ground | | Cranbrook, Kent | 11th |
| Crowborough | Steel Cross | | Crowborough, East Sussex | 4th |
| Deal & Betteshanger | The Drill Field | | Deal, Kent | 9th |
| Dover | Crabble Athletic Ground | | Dover, Kent | 6th |
| Gillingham Anchorians | Darland Banks | | Gillingham, Kent | Promoted from Counties 2 Kent (2nd) |
| Heathfield & Waldron | Hardy Roberts Recreational Ground | | Cross In Hand, Heathfield, East Sussex | 7th |
| Old Elthamians | Hospital Ground | | Chislehurst, London | Promoted from Counties 2 Kent (champions) |
| Park House | Barnet Wood Road | | Hayes, London | 8th |
| Sevenoaks II | Knole Paddock | 1,000 | Sevenoaks, Kent | 3rd |

Locations of the 2025–26 Counties 1 Kent teams in London
Locations of the 2025–26 Counties 1 Kent teams in Kent and East Sussex

== 2024–25 ==
Canterbury Pilgrims finished top but owing to league regulations were not permitted to be promoted to level 6. Departing were Dartfordians promoted to Regional 2 South East as runner-up with Thanet being relegated to Counties 2 Kent. With no team coming down from Regional 2 South East there was a reprieve for Charlton Park who finished 11th and would ordinarily have been relegated to Counties 2 Kent. Joining were Sevenoaks 2XV and Park House from Counties 2 Kent.

| Team | Ground | Capacity | City/Area | Previous season |
|---|---|---|---|---|
| Ashford | Kinney's Field | | Ashford, Kent | 9th |
| Beccehamian | Sparrow's Den | | West Wickham, London | 3rd |
| Bromley | Barnet Wood Road | | Hayes, London | 4th |
| Canterbury II | Marine Travel Ground | | Canterbury, Kent | 1st (not promoted) |
| Charlton Park | Broad Walk | | Kidbrooke, London | 11th |
| Cranbrook | Tomlin Ground | | Cranbrook, Kent | 10th |
| Crowborough | Steel Cross | | Crowborough, East Sussex | 5th |
| Deal & Betteshanger | The Drill Field | | Deal, Kent | 8th |
| Dover | Crabble Athletic Ground | | Dover, Kent | 6th |
| Heathfield & Waldron | Hardy Roberts Recreational Ground | | Cross In Hand, Heathfield, East Sussex | 7th |
| Park House | Barnet Wood Road | | Hayes, London | Promoted from Counties 2 Kent (2nd) |
| Sevenoaks II | Knole Paddock | 1,000 | Sevenoaks, Kent | Promoted from Counties 2 Kent (champions) |

Locations of the 2024–25 Counties 1 Kent teams in London
Locations of the 2024–25 Counties 1 Kent teams in Kent and East Sussex

=== League table ===
Counties 1 Kent 2024–25
| | Team | Played | Won | Drawn | Lost | Points for | Points against | Points diff | Try bonus | Loss bonus | Points | Adjust |
| 1 | Canterbury Pilgrims (P) | 22 | 20 | 0 | 2 | 740 | 309 | 431 | 15 | 1 | 99 | +2 |
| 2 | Bromley (P) | 22 | 18 | 1 | 3 | 748 | 419 | 329 | 13 | 3 | 90 | |
| 3 | Sevenoaks II | 22 | 16 | 0 | 6 | 698 | 448 | 250 | 15 | 4 | 85 | +2 |
| 4 | Crowborough | 22 | 12 | 0 | 10 | 486 | 419 | 67 | 13 | 5 | 67 | +1 |
| 5 | Beccehamian | 22 | 12 | 0 | 10 | 607 | 450 | 157 | 12 | 5 | 66 | +1 |
| 6 | Dover | 22 | 12 | 1 | 9 | 510 | 524 | −14 | 9 | 4 | 64 | +1 |
| 7 | Heathfield & Waldron | 22 | 11 | 0 | 11 | 571 | 457 | 114 | 11 | 5 | 60 | |
| 8 | Park House | 22 | 8 | 0 | 14 | 532 | 605 | −73 | 9 | 7 | 48 | |
| 9 | Deal & Betteshanger | 22 | 9 | 0 | 13 | 418 | 726 | −308 | 6 | 2 | 44 | |
| 10 | Ashford | 22 | 7 | 0 | 15 | 364 | 598 | −234 | 6 | 4 | 38 | |
| 11 | Cranbrook | 22 | 3 | 0 | 19 | 297 | 715 | −418 | 4 | 3 | 9 | −10 |
| 12 | Charlton Park | 22 | 3 | 0 | 19 | 284 | 585 | −301 | 4 | 1 | 2 | −15 |
If teams are level at any stage, tiebreakers are applied in the following order: 1. Number of matches won 2. Number of draws 3. Difference between points for and against 4. Total number of points for 5. Aggregate number of points scored in matches between tied teams 6. Number of matches won excluding the first match, then the second and so on until the tie is settled
Green background are the promotion places. Pink background are the relegation places. Updated: 12 January 2024; Source:

== 2023–24 ==
Departing were Old Alleynians promoted to Regional 2 South East, while Folkestone and Aylesford Bulls were relegated to Counties 2 Kent. In their place came Dover and Canterbury Pilgrims both promoted as 'joint champions' from Counties 2 Kent, whilst Dartfordians were relegated from Regional 2 South East.

| Team | Ground | City/Area | Previous season |
|---|---|---|---|
| Ashford | Kinney's Field | Ashford, Kent | 9th |
| Beccehamian | Sparrow's Den | West Wickham, London | 3rd |
| Bromley | Barnet Wood Road | Hayes, London | 4th |
| Canterbury II | Marine Travel Ground | Canterbury, Kent | Promoted from Counties 2 Kent (joint champions) |
| Charlton Park | Broad Walk | Kidbrooke, London | 5th |
| Cranbrook | Tomlin Ground | Cranbrook, Kent | 10th |
| Crowborough | Steel Cross | Crowborough, East Sussex | 5th |
| Dartfordians | Bourne Road | Bexley, London | Relegated from Regional 2 South East (11th) |
| Deal & Betteshanger | The Drill Field | Deal, Kent | 8th |
| Dover | Crabble Athletic Ground | Dover, Kent | Promoted from Counties 2 Kent (joint champions) |
| Heathfield & Waldron | Hardy Roberts Recreational Ground | Cross In Hand, Heathfield, East Sussex | 7th |
| Thanet Wanderers | St Peter's Recreation Ground | Broadstairs, Kent | 10th |

Locations of the 2023–24 Counties 1 Kent teams in London
Locations of the 2023–24 Counties 1 Kent teams in Kent and East Sussex

=== League table ===
Counties 1 Kent 2023–24
| | Team | Played | Won | Drawn | Lost | Points for | Points against | Points diff | Try bonus | Loss bonus | Points | Adjust |
| C | Canterbury Pilgrims | 22 | 20 | 0 | 2 | 846 | 439 | 407 | 18 | 0 | 98 | |
| 2 | Dartfordians | 22 | 17 | 1 | 4 | 692 | 444 | 248 | 19 | 1 | 90 | |
| 3 | Beccehamian | 22 | 18 | 1 | 3 | 839 | 299 | 540 | 16 | 1 | 86 | −5 |
| 4 | Bromley | 22 | 15 | 1 | 6 | 621 | 416 | 205 | 13 | 3 | 79 | |
| 5 | Crowborough | 22 | 14 | 2 | 6 | 530 | 463 | 67 | 9 | 1 | 70 | |
| 6 | Dover | 22 | 9 | 1 | 12 | 466 | 548 | −82 | 9 | 3 | 50 | |
| 7 | Heathfield & Waldron | 22 | 8 | 2 | 12 | 459 | 469 | −10 | 7 | 6 | 50 | |
| 8 | Deal & Betteshanger | 22 | 8 | 0 | 14 | 403 | 582 | −179 | 6 | 4 | 42 | |
| 9 | Ashford | 22 | 6 | 0 | 16 | 345 | 518 | −173 | 3 | 3 | 30 | |
| 10 | Cranbrook | 22 | 4 | 1 | 17 | 388 | 756 | −368 | 4 | 4 | 26 | |
| 11 | Charlton Park | 22 | 5 | 0 | 17 | 371 | 684 | −313 | 5 | 3 | 23 | −5 |
| 12 | Thanet Wanderers (R) | 22 | 3 | 1 | 18 | 378 | 720 | −342 | 4 | 3 | 21 | |
If teams are level at any stage, tiebreakers are applied in the following order: 1. Number of matches won 2. Number of draws 3. Difference between points for and against 4. Total number of points for 5. Aggregate number of points scored in matches between tied teams 6. Number of matches won excluding the first match, then the second and so on until the tie is settled
Green background is the promotion place. Pink background are the relegation places. Updated: 25 June 2024; Source:

== 2022–23 ==
This was the first season following the RFU Adult Competition Review. The league was substantially similar to London 2 South East with the teams placed 5th to 12th returning. The teams finishing 1st to 4th were promoted to Regional 2 South East (level 6) with the top four teams promoted from London 3 South East (level 8).

| Team | Ground | Capacity | City/Area | Previous season |
|---|---|---|---|---|
| Ashford | Kinney's Field | | Ashford, Kent | 11th L2SE |
| Aylesford Bulls | Jack Williams Ground | | Aylesford, Kent | Promoted from L3SE (2nd) |
| Beccehamian | Sparrow's Den | | West Wickham, London | 10th L2SE |
| Bromley | Barnet Wood Road | | Hayes, London | Promoted from L3SE (champions) |
| Charlton Park | Broad Walk | | Kidbrooke, London | 8th L2SE |
| Cranbrook | Tomlin Ground | | Cranbrook, Kent | Promoted from L3SE (3rd) |
| Crowborough | Steel Cross | | Crowborough, East Sussex | 9th L2SE |
| Deal & Betteshanger | The Drill Field | | Deal, Kent | 7th L2SE |
| Folkestone | New Burlington Ground | | Newington, Folkestone, Kent | 12th L2SE |
| Heathfield & Waldron | Hardy Roberts Recreational Ground | | Cross In Hand, Heathfield, East Sussex | Promoted from L3SE (4th) |
| Old Alleynians | Dulwich Common | | Dulwich, London | 5th L2SE |
| Thanet Wanderers | St Peter's Recreation Ground | | Broadstairs, Kent | 6th L2SE |

Locations of the 2022–23 Counties 1 Kent teams in London
Locations of the 2022–23 Counties 1 Kent teams in Kent and East Sussex

=== League table ===
Counties 1 Kent 2022–23
| | Team | Played | Won | Drawn | Lost | Points for | Points against | Points diff | Try bonus | Loss bonus | Points | Adjust |
| 1 | Old Alleynians (P) | 22 | 20 | 0 | 2 | 890 | 257 | 633 | 16 | 1 | 97 | |
| 2 | Bromley | 22 | 16 | 0 | 6 | 575 | 316 | 259 | 12 | 1 | 77 | |
| 3 | Beccehamian | 22 | 14 | 0 | 8 | 596 | 381 | 215 | 11 | 4 | 71 | |
| 4 | Heathfield & Waldron | 22 | 14 | 0 | 8 | 468 | 486 | −18 | 9 | 3 | 68 | |
| 5 | Charlton Park | 22 | 14 | 0 | 8 | 525 | 537 | −12 | 10 | 1 | 67 | |
| 6 | Cranbrook | 22 | 12 | 0 | 10 | 538 | 511 | 27 | 10 | 1 | 59 | |
| 7 | Ashford | 22 | 12 | 0 | 10 | 440 | 399 | 41 | 4 | 4 | 56 | |
| 8 | Deal & Betteshanger | 22 | 11 | 0 | 11 | 448 | 507 | −39 | 7 | 3 | 55 | |
| 9 | Crowborough | 22 | 8 | 0 | 14 | 443 | 552 | −109 | 7 | 1 | 35 | −5 |
| 10 | Thanet Wanderers | 22 | 7 | 0 | 15 | 309 | 593 | −284 | 5 | 0 | 33 | |
| 11 | Folkestone (R) | 22 | 3 | 0 | 19 | 346 | 797 | −451 | 5 | 4 | 21 | |
| 12 | Aylesford Bulls (R) | 22 | 1 | 0 | 21 | 341 | 603 | −262 | 3 | 6 | 13 | |
If teams are level at any stage, tiebreakers are applied in the following order: 1. Number of matches won 2. Number of draws 3. Difference between points for and against 4. Total number of points for 5. Aggregate number of points scored in matches between tied teams 6. Number of matches won excluding the first match, then the second and so on until the tie is settled
Green background is the promotion place. Pink background are the relegation places. Source:

== Counties 1 Kent honours (2022–present) ==
Following the RFU Adult Competition Review, eight teams finishing 5th to 12th were transferred from London 2 South East and the top four from London 3 South East were promoted to this league. Promotion is to Regional 2 South East and relegation to Counties 2 Kent or Counties 2 Sussex.

Counties 1 Kent
| Season | No of teams | Champions | Runner-up | Relegated team(s) | Ref |
| 2022–23 | 12 | Old Alleynian | Bromley | Folkestone (11th) and Aylesford Bulls (12th) | |
| 2023–24 | 12 | Canterbury Pilgrims | Dartfordians | Thanet Wanderers (12th) | |
| 2024–25 | 12 | Canterbury Pilgrims | Bromley | No relegation | |
Green background is the promotion place(s).

== See also ==
- London & SE Division RFU
- Kent RFU
- Sussex RFU
- English rugby union system
- Rugby union in England
