= County Cricket Ground, Beckenham =

Cricket ground in Greater London, England

The County Ground, Beckenham
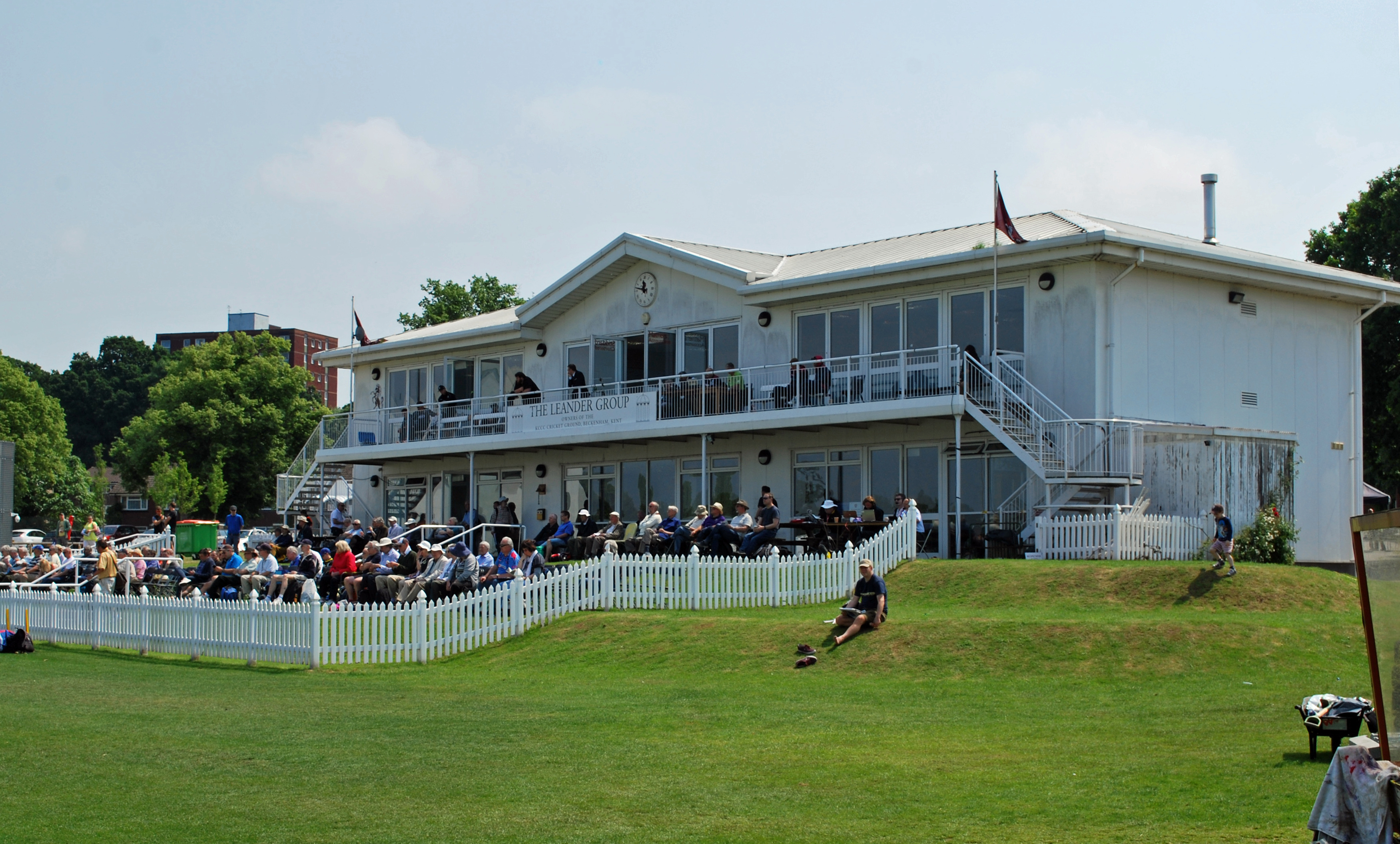
- The pavilion at the County Ground, Beckenham after redevelopment
- Interactive map of The County Ground, Beckenham

Ground information
- Location: Beckenham, London Borough of Bromley
- Country: England
- Coordinates: 51.420°N 0.028°W
- Establishment: 1920
- Capacity: 6,000
- Owner: Leander Sports and Leisure
- Operator: Kent County Cricket Club
- End names
- City End; Beckenham End

International information
- First women's ODI: 21 July 1993: England v New Zealand
- Last women's ODI: 25 July 1993: West Indies v Denmark

Team information
Lloyds Bank RFC	(1920–1999)
Lloyds Bank Cricket Club	(1931–2001)
Kent Women	(1949–present)
Kent County Cricket Club	(1954–present)
South East Stars	(2020–present)
- As of 6 September 2020; Source: Cricinfo

The County Ground, Beckenham is a cricket ground in Beckenham in the London Borough of Bromley. The ground is owned by Leander Sports and Leisure and is used as an outground by Kent County Cricket Club for First XI fixtures, as well as for other matches. As of 2019, the Kent Women cricket team played the majority of their matches at the ground.

The ground, which is situated on a 9.6 hectares (24 acres) site, was first used for first-class cricket in 1954. It hosted two matches during the 1993 Women's Cricket World Cup and has been used by Kent as a regular outground since 2003. The ground was redeveloped in 2001–02 and in 2014; its facilities include a 13-pitch square, a 2,048-seater stand, an indoor cricket school, and 3G football pitches.

== History ==
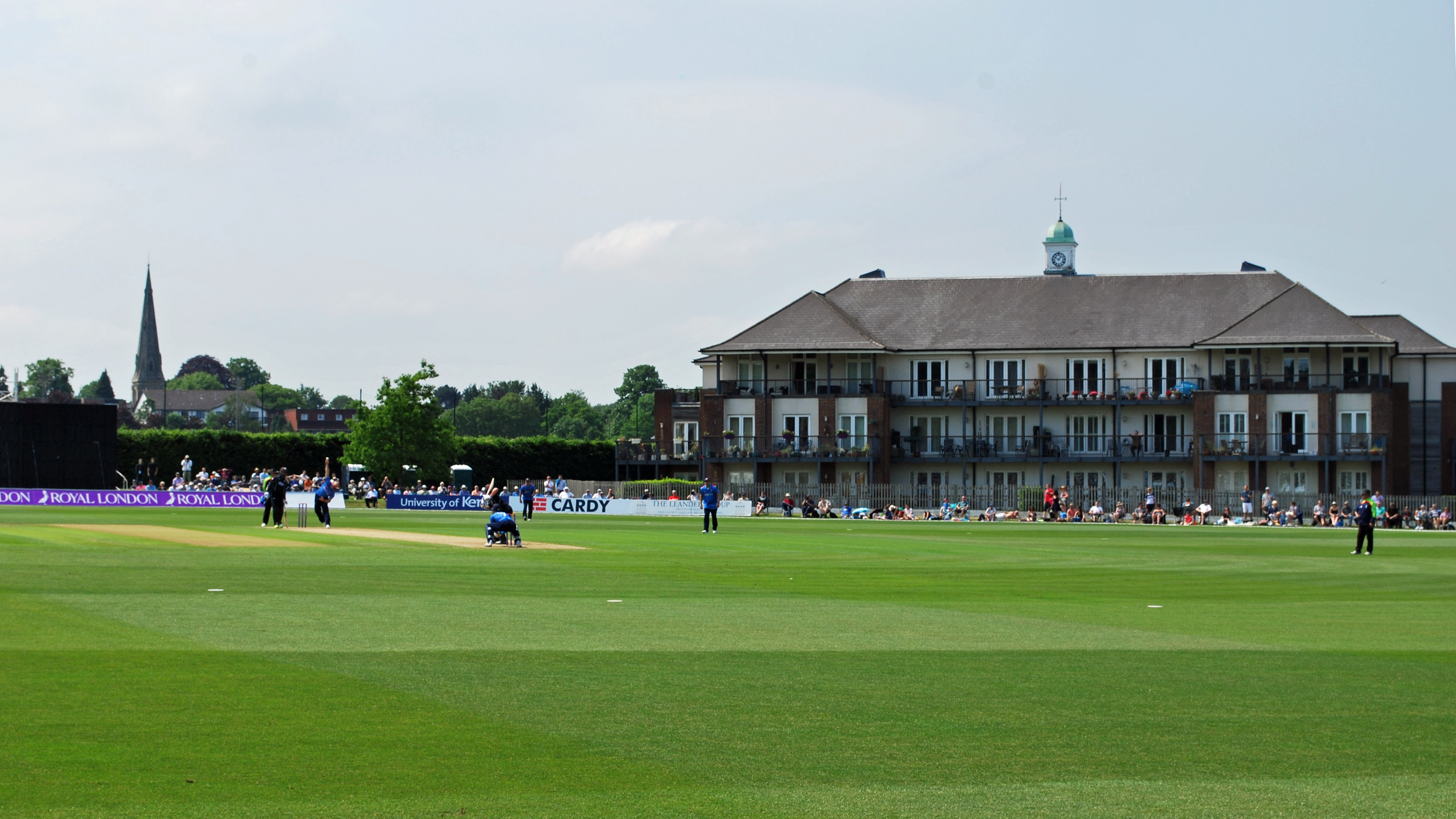
Housing at Beckenham, June 2016

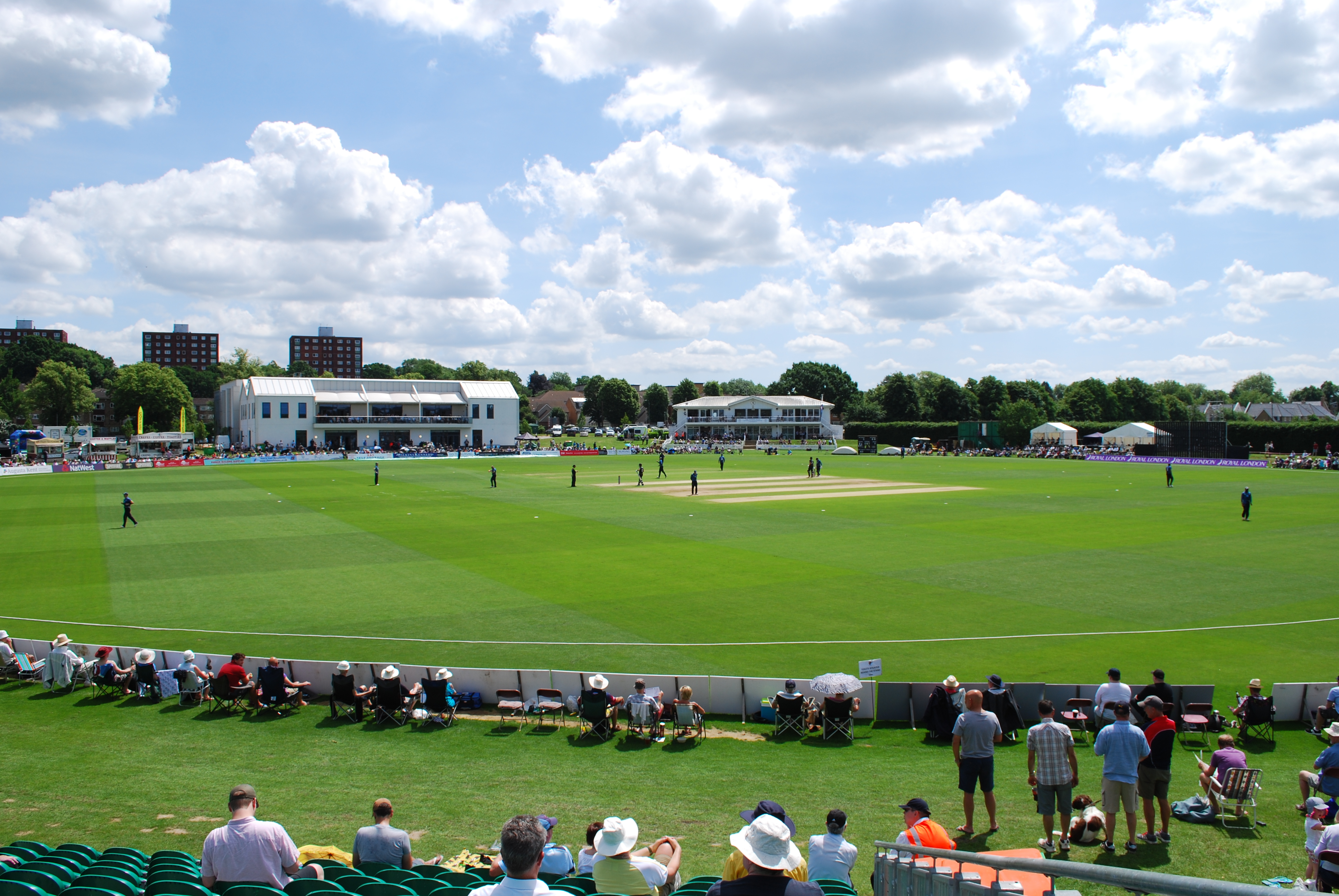
The ground from the new stand during a One Day Cup match between Kent and Gloucestershire in June 2018

The ground was established by Lloyds Bank as its main sports ground in the London area in 1918, having developed facilities at the site in the early 1920s. The 7 acres (2.8 ha) original site served as the base for the bank's sports clubs, including Lloyds Bank Cricket Club and Lloyds Bank RFC. The bank sold the ground—which extended to 25 acres (10 ha) at its greatest extent—to developers for almost £2 million in September 1999, and it is now operated by the Leander Sports and Leisure group.

The ground was first used by the Kent First XI in 1954 when it hosted a County Championship match against Gloucestershire in a low-scoring, rain-affected draw. Kent had previously played home matches at Foxgrove Road in Beckenham between 1885 and 1905, and played one 1970 John Player League match at the nearby Midland Bank Sports Ground in 1970. The county club has a tradition of playing at outgrounds in what is now south-east London. Until the London Government Act 1965, Beckenham, along with other parts of south-east London, was part of the county of Kent, and it is treated by the club as being "Metropolitan Kent". Grounds in nearby Blackheath, Catford, Crystal Palace, and Dartford have all also been used by the club in the past for a total of more than 150 matches; the first match played by the county club after its foundation in 1842 was held at White Hart Field in Bromley.

The ground was used for two women's One Day Internationals during the 1993 Women's Cricket World Cup, but Kent did not use it again until the 2003 season, when they played Gloucestershire in a 2003 ECB National League match and Hampshire in a 2003 Twenty20 Cup match. As of August 2022, it has hosted eight County Championship matches and 15 List A matches, but has mainly been used by Kent for Twenty20 cricket, most commonly for matches against near neighbours Surrey. Notable matches include a one-day game against the touring West Indians in 2004 and the 2008 Friends Provident Trophy quarter-final, a game which had to be moved from the county's usual base at the St Lawrence Ground in Canterbury due to heavy rainfall.

In 2017, a new Kent record for the highest partnership for any first-class wicket was set by Sean Dickson and Joe Denly, who scored 382 runs for the second wicket against Northants. (Note: The partnership was broken by Jordan Cox and Jack Leaning in 2020 at Canterbury.) Kent's total score of 701 for 7 declared was their second-highest in any first-class match and their highest on a home ground. Dickson's score of 318 was the second-highest score in Kent's history and only the third score of 300 or more to have been made by a Kent player for the county. It is the highest individual score made on a home ground by a Kent player.

The County Ground is also used by Kent's second XI and junior teams, as well as being the main ground used by the Kent Women cricket team. Two matches in May 2017 saw Sri Lanka play Scotland in preparation for the 2017 Champions Trophy, and West Indies A played India A in a four-day first-class match at the ground in July 2018.

== Ground development ==
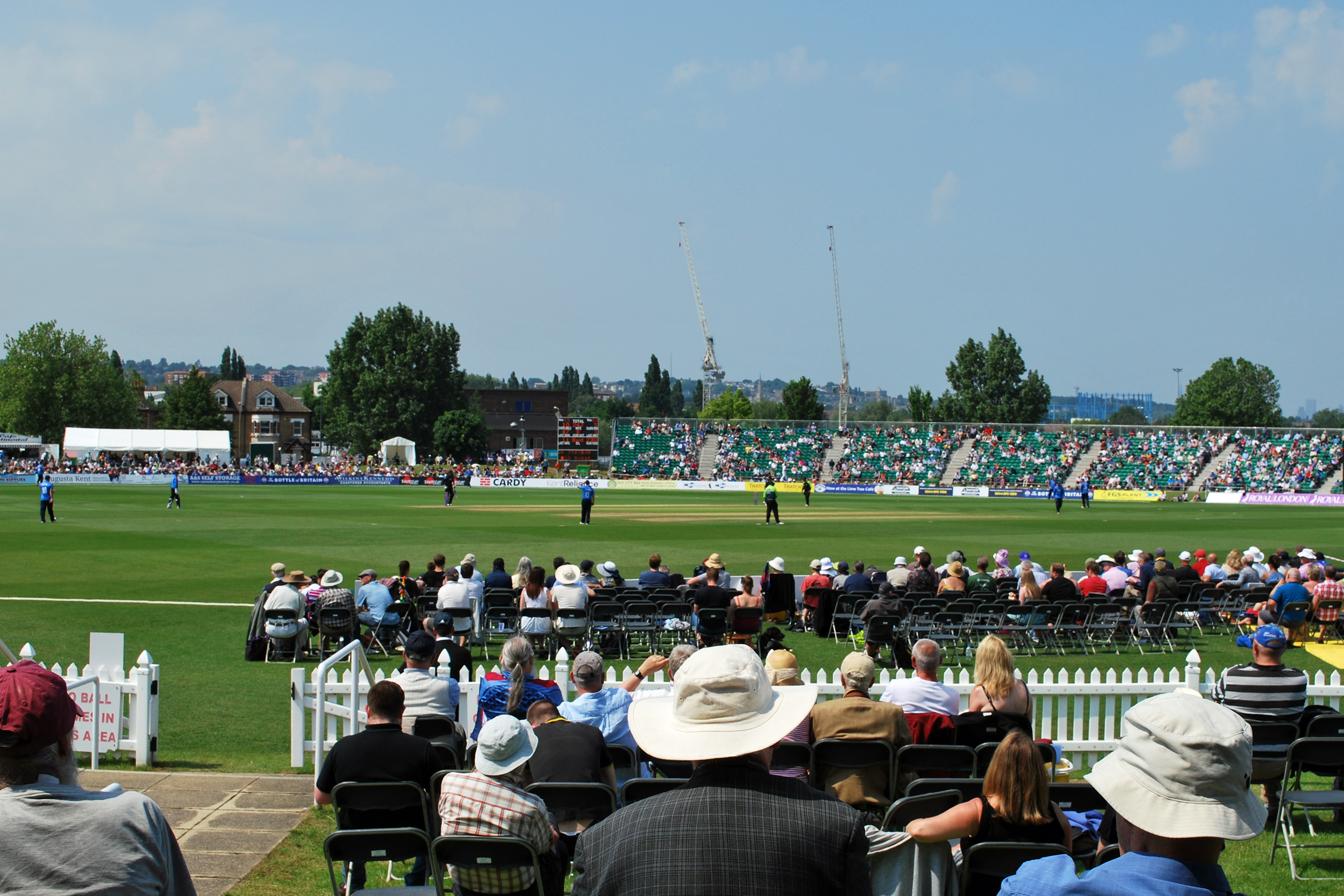
The new stand at Beckenham, June 2016

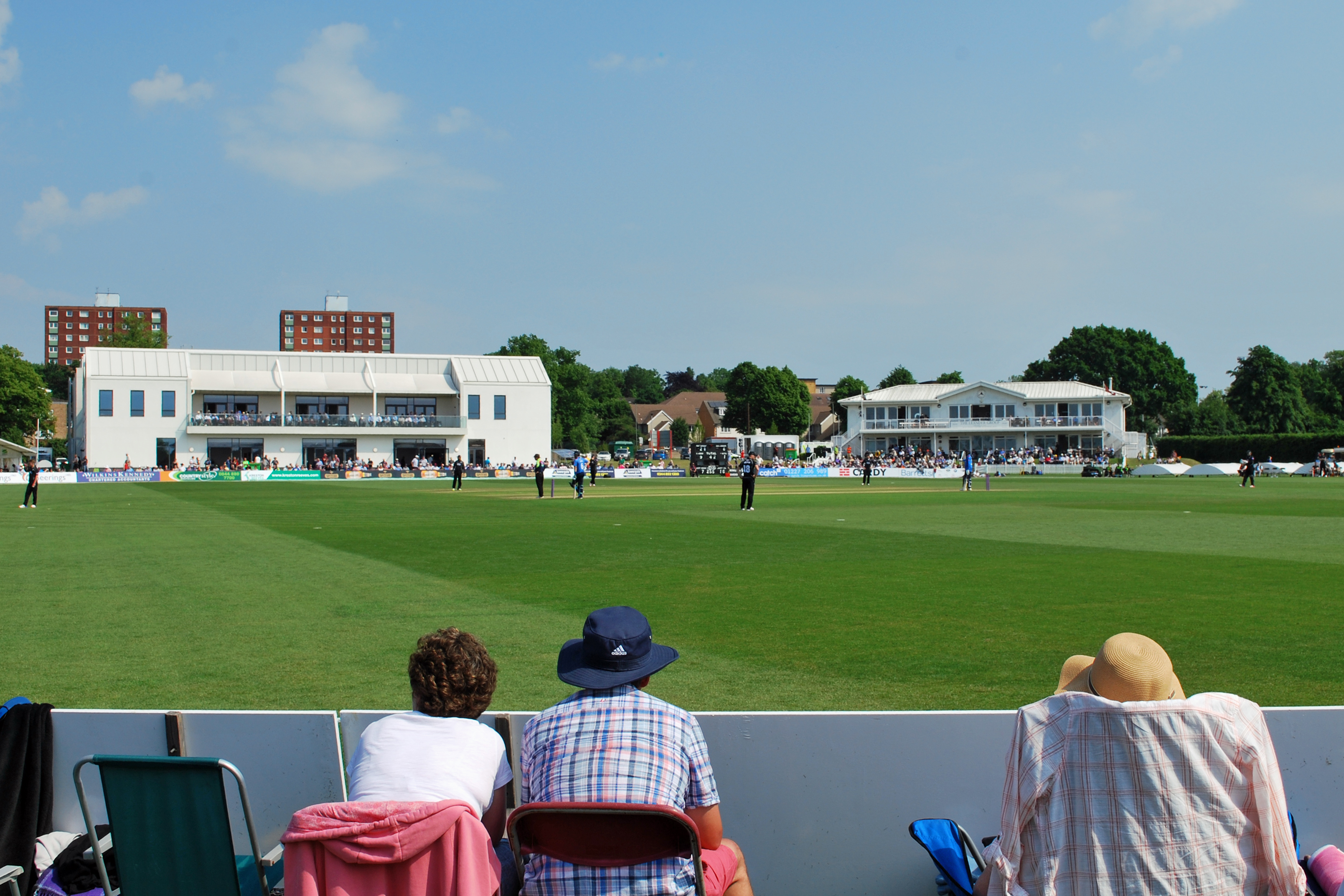
New buildings at Beckenham, June 2016

As a result of the sale of the ground in 1999, its main gates—which are a war memorial commemorating the members of Lloyds Bank who died in World War I and World War II—were removed and stored at the bank's Lombard Street headquarters in central London. They have since been moved to the sports ground at the bank's management training centre in Solihull.

Following the sale of the ground, the facilities were redeveloped by Leander Sports and Leisure, working with Kent and Bromley London Borough Council. A new pavilion was constructed with the aim of turning the ground into a centre of excellence for sports in south-east London. The plans were backed by Ken Livingstone, the Mayor of London at the time. Initial plans were for Kent to return to the ground during 2001, although the first match played at the newly developed ground was in 2003. As part of the development, 42 flats were built on the site, which is designated as Metropolitan Open Land. Kent's matches at Beckenham were partly supported by Bromley Council from 2006.

Further redevelopment of the ground took place in 2014, partly to provide the opportunity to increase revenue from non-cricket activities, as the site was making a loss for the cricket club. Kent had played no matches on it in 2013 and would have pulled out of the ground if the development had not gone ahead. They returned in 2015 with six days of cricket scheduled, including a County Championship match and two NatWest t20 Blast fixtures. The £30 million redevelopment has seen the club open a new indoor cricket centre and a function centre, and the ground now features a permanent 2,048-seat spectator stand and all-weather sports facilities. The ground adjoins the training facilities used by Crystal Palace Football Club, who make some use of the all-weather facilities on the site. A new digital scoreboard has been installed at the ground and the outfield has been improved.

The ground owners, Leander Sports and Leisure, built 48 houses on part of the site in order to fund the redevelopment, which includes a number of year-round facilities, including an indoor cricket school, 3G football pitches, and a physiotherapy clinic. Redevelopment was seen as essential in order to keep the ground as a financially viable cricketing venue, with the aim of developing a significant base for Kent in the north-west of the county to develop younger cricketers, and as a general sports development hub in metropolitan Kent. Kent took an initial 20-year lease on the ground and have the aim of further developing the ground in the future.

In February 2024, Kent's Chief Executive Simon Storey confirmed that the club were exploring the possibility of hosting a third London-based team in The Hundred at Beckenham, amid plans for an expansion from an 8-team to a 10-team competition. This came after Beckenham was originally intended to host Oval Invincibles Women before their matches were moved to The Oval.

== Transport ==
The ground is around 0.5 miles (0.80 km) north of Beckenham town centre with the main entrance on the Worsley Bridge Road. The A2015 road runs 220 metres (0.14 mi) to the east of the ground whilst the Mid-Kent railway line is around 300 metres (0.19 mi) to the west. Lower Sydenham railway station and New Beckenham railway station, on the Mid-Kent line, Beckenham Hill railway station on the Catford Loop Line and Beckenham Junction station on the Chatham Main Line and Tramlink are all located within 1 mile (1.6 km) of the ground.

The ground is on London Buses route 54 and route 352. Around 350 car parking spaces are available on the ground on match days.

== Records on the ground ==
As of July 2025, nine first-class, 21 List A and 23 Twenty20 men's matches have been held on the ground, most of which have featured Kent as the home team. Two women's One Day International matches were held at the ground in 1993, the ground has been used by Kent's women's team, by South East Stars, one of eight regional teams in English domestic women's cricket between 2020 and 2024, and, in 2025, by Surrey women.

The ground has tended to produce "flat, white wickets" which favour batting and a number of Kent's batting records have been set on the ground.

All records last updated 9 August 2025

=== First-class cricket ===
- Highest total: 701/7 declared by Kent against Northants, 2017
- Lowest total: 110 by Gloucestershire against Kent, 1954
- Highest partnership: 382, 2nd wicket by SR Dickson and JL Denly, for Kent against Northants, 2017
- Highest individual score: 318, SR Dickson for Kent against Northants, 2017
- Best bowling in an innings: 6/55, AC Shireff for Kent against Gloucestershire, 1954
- Best bowling in a match: 7/69, SP Kirby for Gloucestershire against Kent, 2009

Kent's record partnership for any wicket in first-class cricket, second highest team score in first-class cricket and second highest individual score in first-class cricket were all set on the ground in July 2017 against Northants. The score of 701/7 declared set the team's highest score on a home ground and included only the third triple-century scored by a player playing for Kent, Sean Dickson's 318 runs. The best bowling in a match for Kent was the 7/74 taken by Azhar Mahmood against Gloucestershire in 2009.

=== List A cricket ===
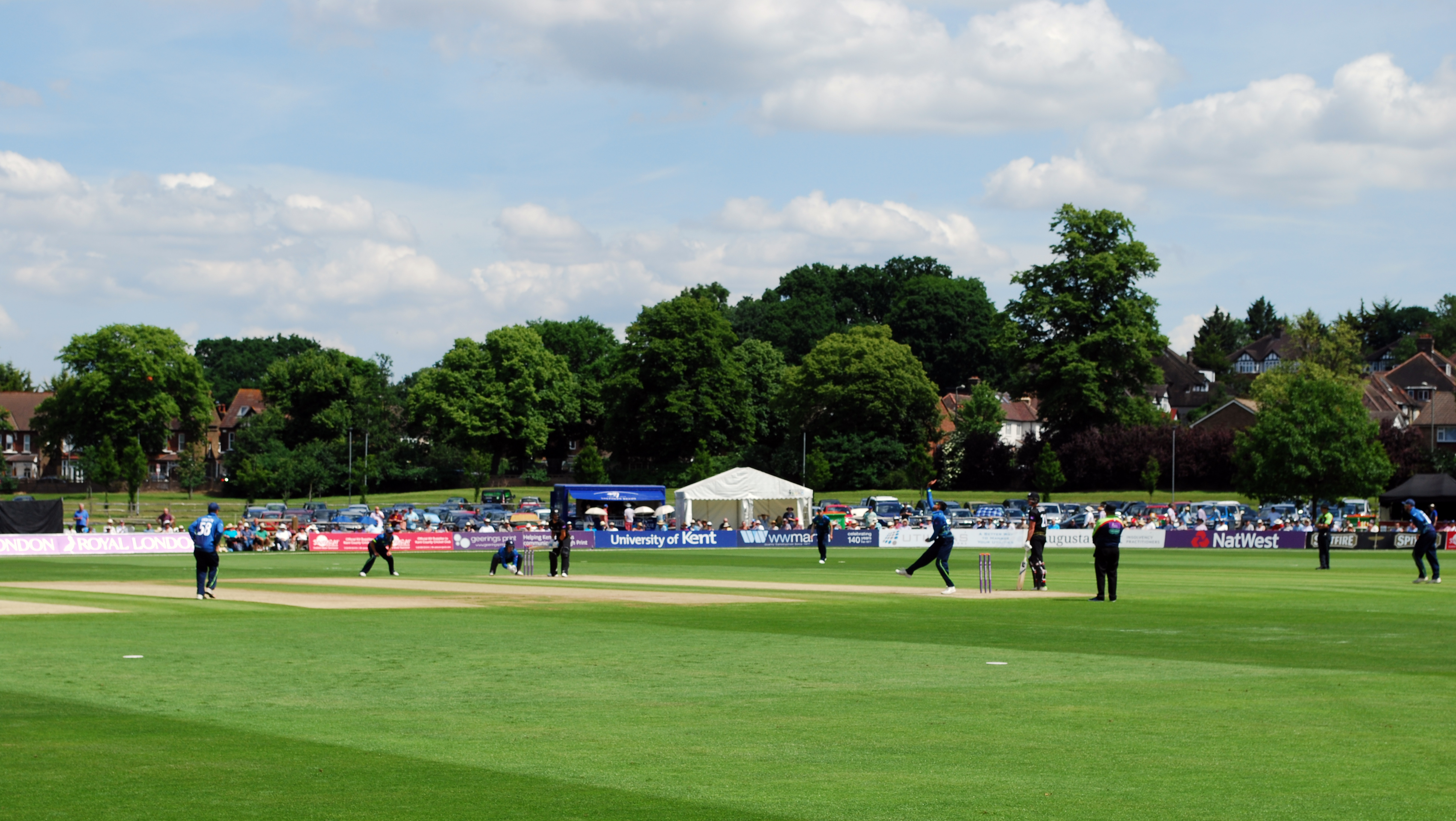
Kent fielding during the One Day Cup match against Gloucestershire in June 2018

- Highest total: 405/4 by Durham against Kent, 2021 (50 over match)
- Highest partnership: 242, 1st wicket by G Clark and A Lees, for Durham against Kent, 2021
- Highest individual score: 141 not out, G Clark for Durham against Kent, 2021
- Best bowling: 6/25, DI Stevens for Kent against Surrey, 2018

The highest List A score on the ground was set by Durham in 2021. Their score of 405/4 surpassed the previous best, Kent's 384/8 against Surrey in June 2018, which had equalled Kent's highest List A score and set a new record for their highest score in a 50-over match and against a first-class county. Darren Stevens' 6/25 taken in the match against Surrey are the best bowling figures on the ground. The match also saw Kent record their highest margin of victory in terms of runs in List A cricket, winning by 220 runs.

The highest individual score on the ground is the 181 scored by Hampshire batsman Tom Prest in 2021. In 2021 Durham's Graham Clark, who scored 141 not out, and Alex Lees scored 242 runs for the first-wicket against Kent, a new record for any wicket on the ground in List A cricket.

=== Twenty20 cricket ===
- Highest total: 204/5 by Kent against Essex, 2008
- Highest partnership: 135, 2nd wicket by JL Denly and Azhar Mahmood, for Kent against Gloucestershire, 2011
- Highest individual score: 106*, Azhar Mahmood for Kent against Gloucestershire, 2011
- Best bowling: 5/17, Wahab Riaz for Kent against Gloucestershire, 2011

Kent's match against Gloucestershire in 2011 saw the only T20 century scored on the ground, Azhar Mahmood scoring 106 not out as Kent won by eight wickets. Wahab Riaz, in his debut for the county, took the only T20 five-wicket haul on the ground, which included Kent's second T20 hat-trick. Wahab's figures of 5/17 remained Kent's best T20 bowling figures until 2017 when Adam Milne took 5/11 against Somerset at Taunton.

== See also ==
- List of Kent County Cricket Club grounds
