= Kent 4 =

English rugby union league

- Sport: Rugby Union
- Instituted: 1987; 39 years ago
- Ceased: 2001; 25 years ago
- Number of teams: 6
- Country: England
- Most titles: Orpington (3 titles)

Kent 4 was an English Rugby Union league that was the fourth tier for clubs in south-east London and Kent. Promoted teams went up to Kent 3 and there was no relegation. Initially created in 1987 the league ran for ten seasons before being cancelled at the end of the 1996–97 season. Kent 4 was brought back in 2000 but after just one season, the six team division folded for the second time and all teams were automatically promoted to Kent 3.

== Original teams ==
When league rugby began in 1987 this division contained the following teams:

- Darenth Valley (Note: Darenth Valley would fold in 1998 and be reformed as Dartford Valley RFC.)
- East Peckham
- Edenbridge
- Footscray
- Lordswood
- Old Olavians
- Old Williamsonians
- University of Kent
- Whitstable

== Kent 4 Honours ==
Kent 4 Honours
Season	No of Teams	Champions	Runners–up	Relegated Teams
1987–88	9	Old Williamsonians	Old Olavians	No relegation
1988–89	9	Citizens	Darenth Valley	No relegation
1989–90	11	Orpington	Footscray	No relegation
1990–91	11	Bexley	Thames Polytechnic	No relegation
1991–92	12	Orpington	Whitstable (Note: Kent league restructuring meant that 3rd and 4th place Kent Police and Footscray were also promoted.)	No relegation
1992–93	6	Lordswood	Darenth Valley	No relegation
1993–94	6	Old Olavians	Greenwich	No relegation
1994–95	5	Orpington	Footscray	No relegation
1995–96	6	Edenbridge	Canterbury Exiles	No relegation
1996–97	5	Darenth Valley	Greenwich (Note: The cancellation of Kent 4 at the end of the season meant that four clubs would be promoted into Kent 3. Bottom club Westerham would drop out of the leagues.)	No relegation
1997–98	No competition			
1998–99	No competition			
1999–00	No competition			
2000–01	6	Vigo	Shooters Hill (Note: As Kent 4 was to be cancelled all teams in the division were automatically promoted to Kent 3.)	No relegation
Green backgrounds are promotion places.

== Number of league titles ==
- Orpington (3)
- Bexley (1)
- Citizens (1)
- Darenth Valley (1)
- Edenbridge (1)
- Lordswood (1)
- Old Olavians (1)
- Old Williamsonians (1)
- Vigo (1)

== See also ==
- London & SE Division RFU
- Kent RFU
- English rugby union system
- Rugby union in England
