= John Selwyn Moll =

British Lions rugby union player

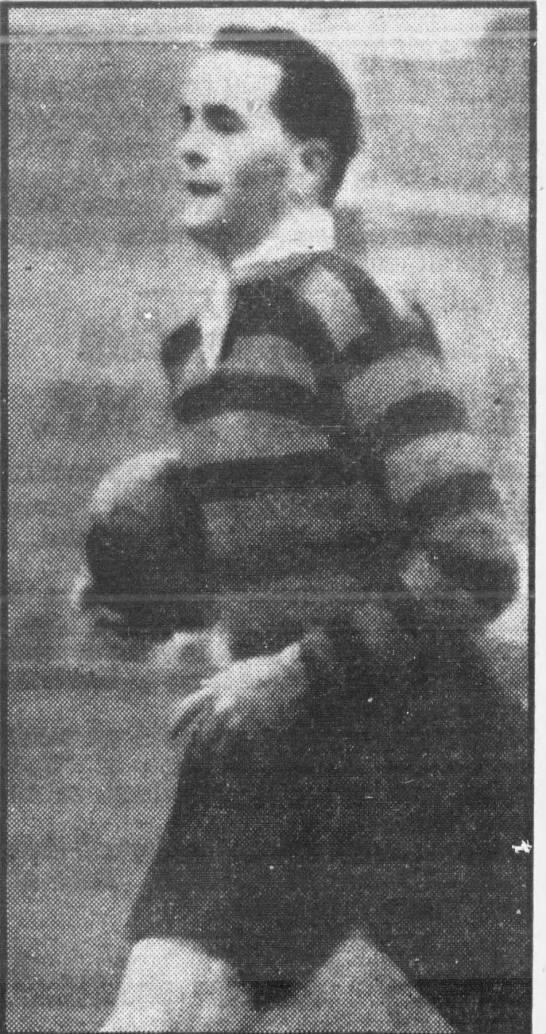
- Moll playing for Blackheath in 1939
- Full name: John Selwyn Moll
- Born: 1913 Greenwich, London, England
- Died: 24 July 1942 (aged 28–29) Bury St. Edmunds, Suffolk, England
- School: Bedford School
- Occupation: Banker

Rugby union career
- Position: Centre
Senior career
Years	Team	Apps	(Points)
1932–1938	Lloyds Bank		
1938–1940	Blackheath		
Provincial / State sides
Years	Team	Apps	(Points)
1938	Kent		
International career
Years	Team	Apps	(Points)
1936	British Lions	2	
1939	Barbarians	1	
National sevens team
Years	Team		Comps
1939–1942	Rosslyn Park		

John Selwyn Moll (1913 – 24 July 1942) was an English banker, British Army officer, and rugby union player born in Greenwich, London. He worked as a banker for Lloyds Bank and, played club rugby for Lloyds Bank RFC and Blackheath, and played for the British Lions on their 1936 tour to Argentina as a centre. He was killed during the Second World War whilst at Bury St. Edmunds, Suffolk.

== Rugby career ==
Moll was born in Greenwich and was educated at Bedford School. After playing rugby for the school, he worked for Lloyds Bank and played for the bank's rugby club. In 1936, despite never being called up for the England national rugby union team, he was called up to play for the British Lions on their tour of Argentina. Upon returning, in 1938, he played rugby for Blackheath in Kent and played County Championship rugby representing Kent. He also played for the Barbarians in 1939. During the Second World War, he played rugby sevens for Rossyln Park.

== Military career ==
Moll was a member of the Army Cadet Force whilst at Bedford School, and upon leaving, he joined the Northumberland Hussars regiment of the Territorial Army. When the Second World War started in 1939, Moll signed up for the Royal Engineers. In 1940, he was commissioned as an officer in the Queen's Royal Regiment (West Surrey). Later, he was commissioned as a captain in the Regiment. In 1942, he died as a result of an accident in Bury St Edmunds whilst his Regiment was training for deployment to Iraq. Details of his death were not released; however, he was declared as having "died of wounds received on active service" by Lieutenant T. E. Redfern, a fellow rugby player from Rosslyn Park. He was listed on the regiment's Roll of Honour. He was buried at Christ Church, Shamley Green, in Surrey. A memorial plaque dedicated to Moll was also installed inside the church.
