= Lloyds Bank RFC =

- Full name: Lloyds Bank Rugby Football Club
- Union: RFU
- Founded: 1912
Team kit

Lloyds Bank Rugby Football Club are an English rugby union club. They are the works team of Lloyds Bank and were founded in 1912 by staff at the bank's London office. Until 2000, they played their home matches at the Lloyds Bank Sports and Social Club Ground in Beckenham, London.

== History ==
In 1912, a meeting of Lloyds Bank's staff was held "declaring a strong enthusiasm for rugby union" where they decided to found a rugby club under the chairmanship of E.W. Nutall, the Head Office Cashier. At the meeting it was decreed that each player would contribute five shillings for subscriptions and they would play in white jerseys and black shorts. In their debut season, they defeated fellow bank sides including the Bank of England and Chartered Bank of London.

In 1918, Lloyds Bank merged with Capital and Counties Bank. As a result, Lloyds Bank RFC moved their home matches to the Capital and Counties Bank's sports ground in New Beckenham, Kent. In 1936, Lloyds Bank's J.S. Moll was selected to join the British Lions on the 1936 British Lions tour to Argentina, despite never being called up to the England national rugby union team. In 1947 during the AGM of the Rugby Football Union, Lloyds Bank RFC put forward a number of law amendments in relation to introducing professionalism into amateur rugby union. However, they withdrew them at the meeting. Lloyds Bank RFC have also hosted Kent County Cricket Club's National League matches.

In 2000, it was announced that Lloyds TSB had sold Lloyds Bank RFC's ground to developers. This was part of a number of cost-cutting measures following Lloyds Bank's merger with the Trustee Savings Bank in 1997. As a result, Lloyds Bank RFC groundshared with rival bank NatWest RFC. Lloyds Bank RFC still play matches against fellow financial institutions.
