= Auber =

Auber is a surname. Notable people with the surname include:

== Surname ==
- Brigitte Auber (born 1925), French actress
- Daniel Auber (1782–1871), French composer
- Gabriele Auber (born 1994), Italian diver
- Harriet Auber (1773–1862), English poet and hymnist
- Olivier Auber (born 1960), French artist and researcher
- Virginia Felicia Auber (1825–1897), Spanish author

== Given name ==
- Auber Jones (1832–1887), Australian farmer, newspaper owner and politician

== Other ==
- Auber station, a Paris railway station
- Auber, short for Aubervilliers, a commune in Seine-Saint-Denis, Île-de-France

== See also ==
- Aubers
