= Martha Moulsworth =

English poet and autobiographer

- Born: Martha Dorsett; 10 November 1577; Oxfordshire, England (likely Ewelme)
- Died: 1646 (aged 68–69); Hoddesdon, Hertfordshire, England
- Spouse(s): Nicholas Prynne (m. 1598) Thomas Thorowgood (m. 1605) Bevill Moulsworth (m. 1619)
- Writing career
- Period: English Renaissance
- Genres: Life writing, autobiography
- Notable works: Memorandum of Martha Moulsworth, Widowe (1632)

Martha Moulsworth (10 November 1577 – c. 28 October 1646), born Martha Dorsett, was an English writer who spent much of her life in Hoddesdon, Hertfordshire. Her only known literary work, (Note: Moulsworth's will also survives.) Memorandum of Martha Moulsworth, Widow (1632), an autobiographical poem, is one of the earliest known autobiographies in English.

== Life ==
Moulsworth was likely a landowner, as she alludes in her poem to her father's passing and the fact that he 'had, & left lands of his owne possession'.

Moulsworth was well educated: according to the Memorandum, she learned Latin, and her text evinces a wealth of biblical knowledge. Evans suggests that Moulsworth was a Laudian; he notes in later work, however, that she was godmother to William Prynne, which may seem to cast doubt on this view.

A sermon delivered in honour of Moulsworth's death notes that her academic interests included history and theology. Jane Stevenson and Peter Davidson argue that '[h]er poem suggests a life of reading and thinking about religious issues, and is in the tradition of spiritual autobiography'.

One puzzle about the Memorandum is Moulsworth's claim that her father taught her Latin. This is impossible, as scholarship has revealed that Moulsworth's father was Robert Dorsett, who died 29 May 1580—when Moulsworth was not even three years old. Dorsett was an Anglican minister and canon of Christ Church, who graduated Oxford with an MA in 1567 and was a tutor of Robert and Philip Sidney. Depas-Orange suggests that Moulsworth casts her father as her teacher out of a 'desire to emulate her father's achievements'; Evans, due to a 'sense of the need for patriarchal sanction'.

Moulsworth was widowed three times; her favourite husband, Bevill Moulsworth, was her last. Bevill was a goldsmith, merchant, and member of the Worshipful Company of Goldsmiths.

== Works ==
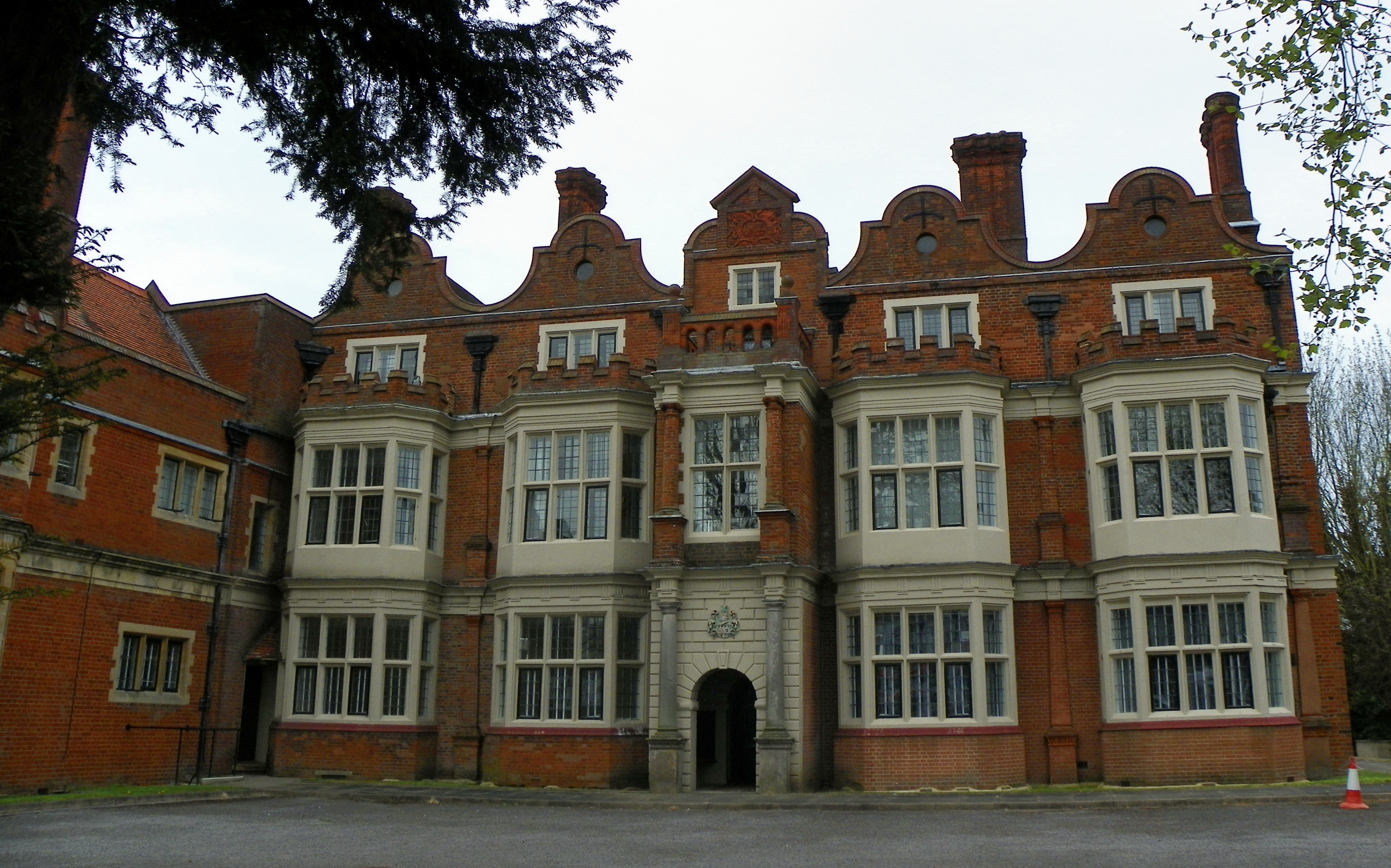
Rawdon House in Hoddesdon. The commonplace book containing Moulsworth's Memorandum belonged to Marmaduke Rawdon (1610–1669), a member of the Rawdon family.

Moulsworth is known to have written only one work—the Memorandum (1632)—but Steggle has argued that another poem should be attributed to her.

=== Memorandum ===
Moulsworth wrote her Memorandum on 10 November 1632, on the occasion of her 55th birthday. At 110 lines, it assigns one couplet to each year of her life.

Wilcox and Evans have drawn particular attention to a passage of the Memorandum in which Moulsworth explains her notably progressive views on women's education. The passage, with a transcription in modern English, is as follows:

Original manuscript

... the muses ffemalls are
and therfore of Vs ffemales take some care
Two Vniuersities we haue of men
o thatt we had but one of women then
O then thatt would in witt, and tongs surpasse
All art of men thatt is, or euer was

Modern English

... the Muses females are
And therefore of us females take some care
Two universities we have of men
O that we had one of women then
O then that in wit and tongues surpass
All art of men that is, or ever was

Post distinguishes Moulsworth from contemporaries including Lady Mary Wroth and Emilia Lanier, noting that while Wroth and Lanier wrote with the concerns and pressures of courtly life in mind, Moulsworth had other preoccupations: '[f]or both Anne Bradstreet and Martha Moulsworth', he writes, 'it is not the court or the patronage system that motivates their poetry ... [I]t is the circumstantial relationship with other members of their family that lies at the core of their poetry'. Wilcox compares the Memorandum to the Devotions of John Donne (1624), published two years after the Memorandum was written.

There is only one known copy of the Memorandum, which is included in a commonplace book at the Beinecke Rare Book & Manuscript Library that belonged to Marmaduke Rawdon (1610–1669). The Memorandum was apparently unknown until the 1990s, and published for the first time shortly thereafter.

=== Other works ===
Steggle argues that a poem titled 'Thou who dost all my earthly thoughts employ', previously attributed to Mary Molesworth Monck (d. 1715) should in fact be attributed to Martha Moulsworth.

== Sources ==
- Depas-Orange, Ann (1996). "Moulsworth's Life and Times". Critical Matrix. 10: 7–10.
- Evans, Robert C. (1995). "A Silent Woman Speaks: 'The Memorandum of Martha Moulsworth, Widowe'". The Yale University Library Gazette. 69 (3/4): 149–162. ISSN 0044-0175. JSTOR 40859118.
- Evans, Robert C. (1997). "Deference and Defiance: The 'Memorandum' of Martha Moulsworth". In Summers, Claude J.; Pebworth, Ted-Larry (eds.). Representing Women in Renaissance England. Columbia, Missouri: University of Missouri Press. ISBN 0-8262-1104-6. OCLC 36566009.
- Evans, Robert C. (2011). "Memory in Moulsworth's 'Memorandum'". Early Modern Women. 6: 203–208. doi:10.1086/EMW23617337. ISSN 1933-0065. JSTOR 23617337. S2CID 236502105.
- Post, Jonathan F. S. (1999). English Lyric Poetry: The Early Seventeenth Century. London: Routledge. ISBN 0-203-00631-3. OCLC 51273608.
- Wilcox, Helen (2001). Piesse, A. J. (ed.). The Making of Sixteenth-Century Identities. Manchester: Manchester University Press. pp. 155–178. ISBN 978-0-7190-5383-2.
