= Mansion House, York =

Grade I listed building in England

Coordinates: 53.959912°N 1.084862°W

Mansion House
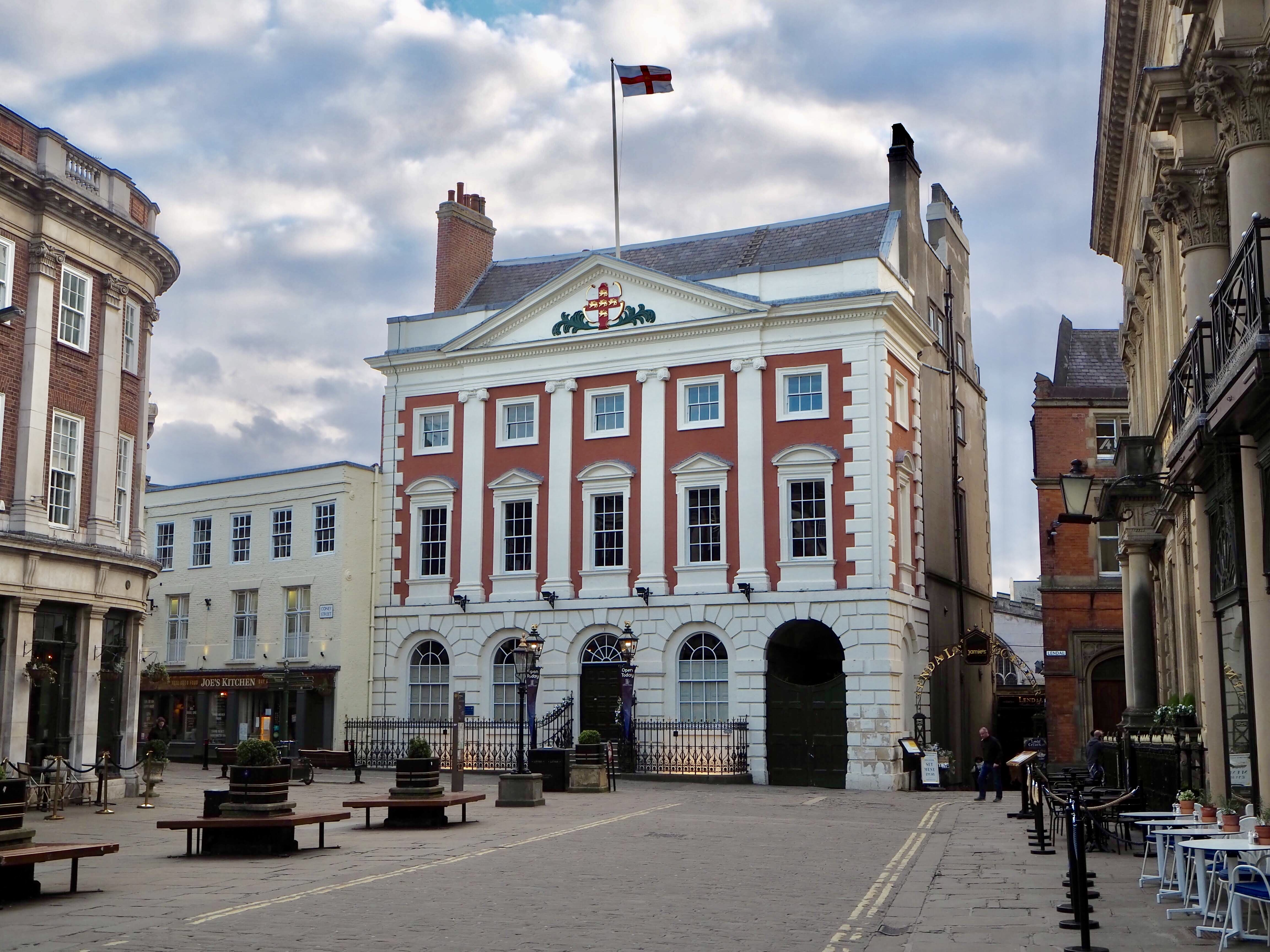
- The Mansion House at St Helen's Square in York

- Location within North Yorkshire
- Location: St Helen's Square, York, England

History
- Built: 1725–1732
- Built for: Lord Mayor of York
- Original use: Official residence

Site notes
- Architect: William Etty
- Architectural style: Georgian
- Restored: 2015
- Restored by: York Civic Trust
- Current use: Museum and residence
- Owner: City of York Council
- Website: mansionhouseyork.com

Listed Building – Grade I
- Official name: Mansion House, railings and gas lamps attached to front
- Designated: 14 June 1954
- Reference no.: 1257969

The Mansion House in York, England, is the working residence of the Lord Mayors of York during their term in office. It stands in St Helen's Square, where York's Coney Street and Lendal intersect in the city centre. It is built in an early Georgian style. The Mansion House is the earliest purpose-built house for a Lord Mayor still in existence, and predates the Mansion House in London by at least twenty years.

The foundation stone for the Mansion House was laid in 1725, with the building being completed seven years later in 1732. The architect who designed the Mansion House is unknown, although the frontage may be by William Etty.

== History ==
In 1998 the house was restored by the York Civic Trust. In October 2015 the Mansion House was closed for refurbishment as part of the "Opening Doors" Heritage Lottery Fund refurbishment and reopened in 2017. The four main areas of the "Opening Doors" project involve restoring the original kitchens; improving displays; conservation and access to the civic collection of gold and silverware; developing an integrated environmental and conservation plan for the structure: and conducting and oral History project.

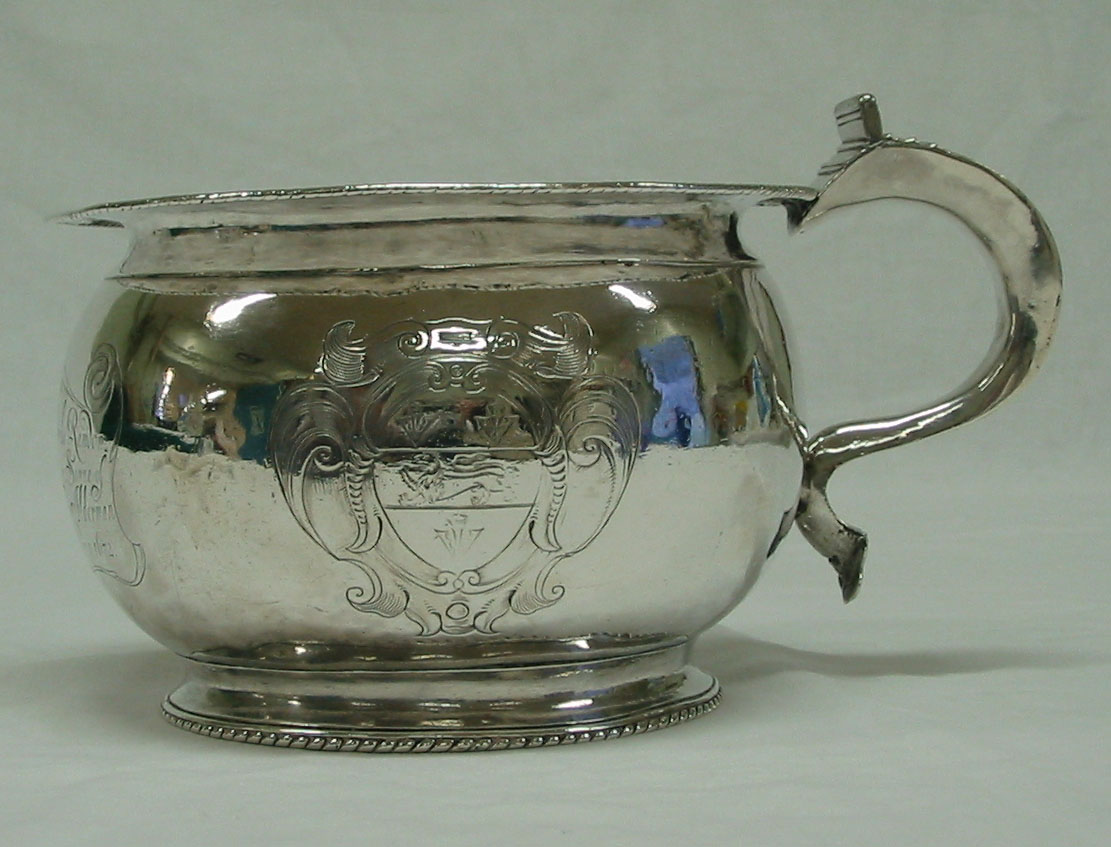
Charles II chamber pot made by Marmaduke Best, York, c. 1671 and engraved with the arms of Marmaduke Rawdon.

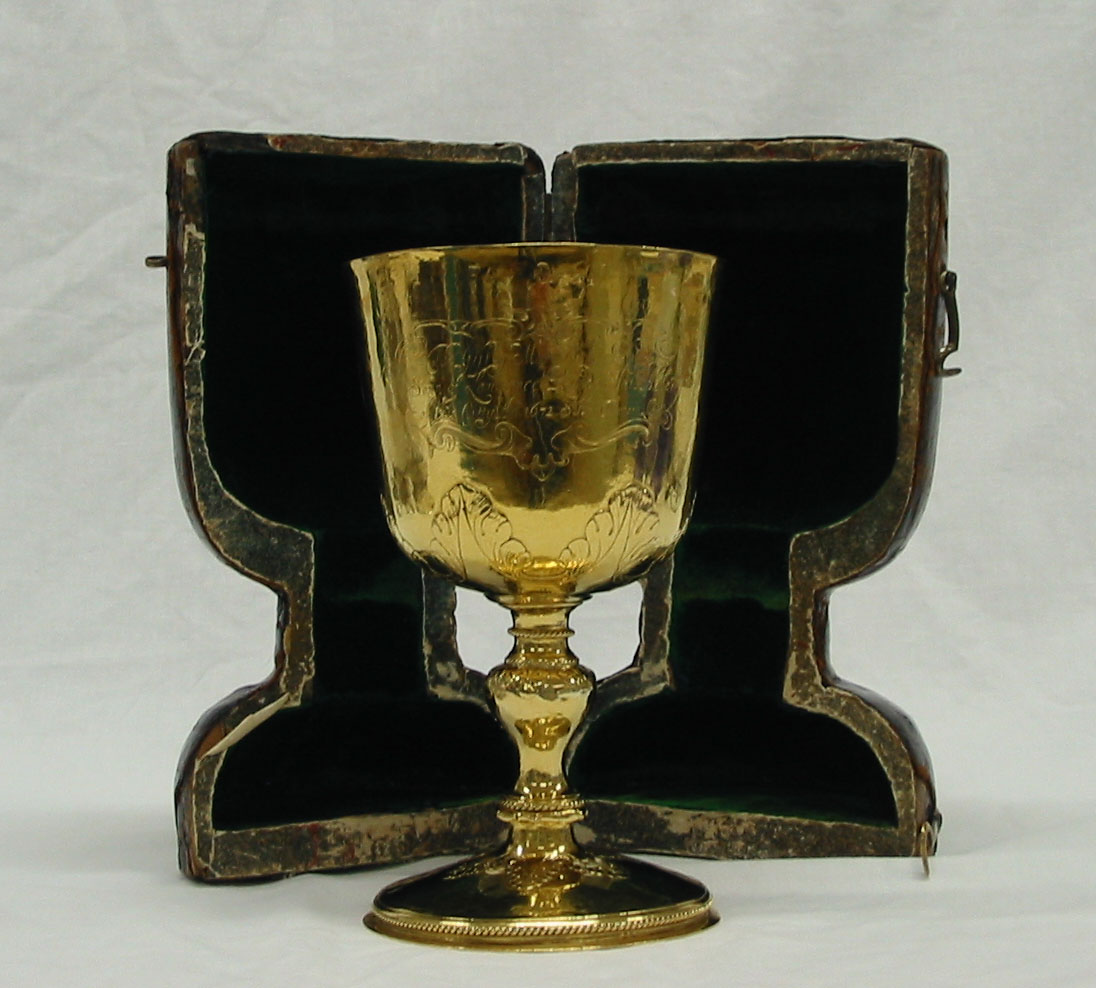
Charles II gold cup made by Marmaduke Best, York, c. 1672 and engraved with the arms of Marmaduke Rawdon

The Mansion House is built on the site of the old "Common Hall Gates" which provided an entrance to the Guildhall. A chapel and other property and tenements which were once owned by the Guild of St. Christopher and St. George including the Cross Keys Public House also lay on this site. These buildings were demolished to build the current Mansion House in 1724. The 15th-century York Guildhall is situated behind the Mansion House, where the medieval city council held their meetings. In May of each year the Mayor Making ceremony is still held in the Guildhall before the Lord Mayor takes up residence in the Mansion House.

== Collections ==
=== Silver ===
The Mansion House holds one of the largest civic silver collections in England. These collections have been displayed in a new Silver Gallery enabling visitors to view the collections since January 2017. Two of the earliest pieces are a 17th-century silver chamber pot and gold cup which were bought for the City of York with monies bequeathed by Marmaduke Rawdon in 1669. Marmaduke left "one drinking cup of pure gold of the vallew of one hundred pounds, which I desire my executor to have handsomely made, and the cittie arms and my arms graven upon it, "This is the guift of Marmaduke Rawdon, son of Laurence Rawdon, late of this cittie alderman"; alsoe, I give unto the said cittie a silver chamber pott of the value of ten pounds, booth are to goe from Lord Maior to lord Maior, and if these two bee converted to any other use the vallew thereof to return to my executor or his heirs".

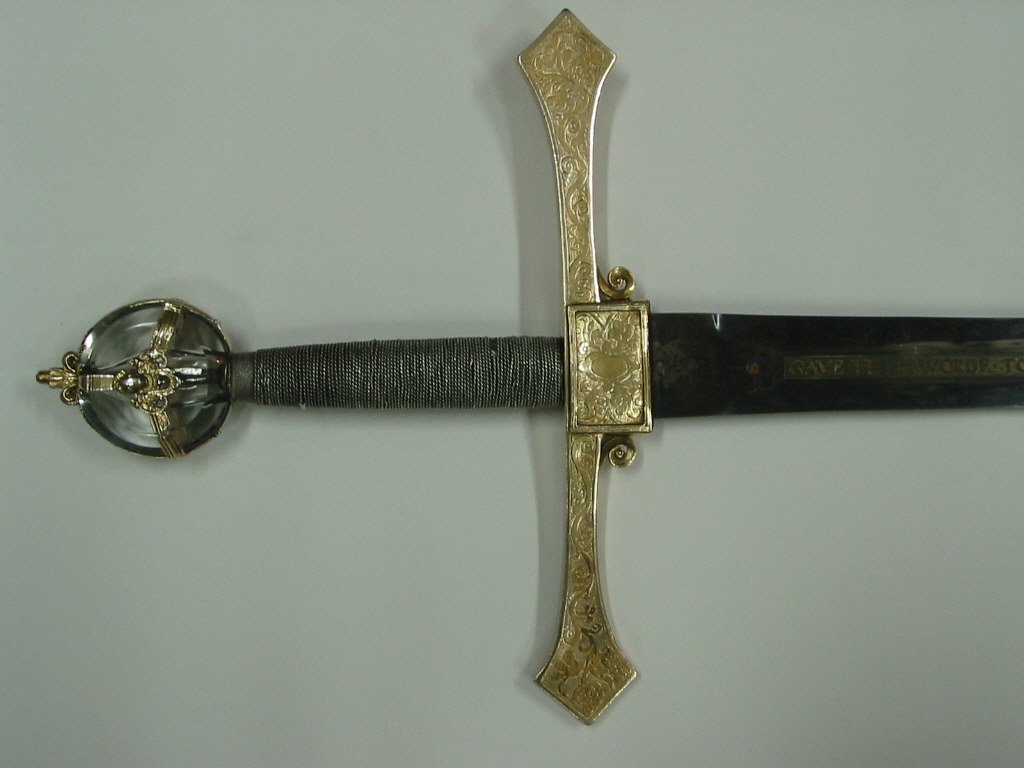
The Bowes sword donated by Sir Martin Bowes in 1549

=== Maces and swords ===
The collection of civic regalia also includes a 17th-century mace and two city swords. The Bowes Sword was donated to the City of York by Sir Martin Bowes, Lord Mayor of London 1545. Bowes was born in York and was christened in St Cuthbert's Church, York, where many of his family were also buried. In the 16th century there was a move to reduce the number of parish churches in York and Bowes pleaded to the council to save St. Cuthbert's. In thanks for saving St. Cuthbert's Bowes wrote to York on 20 September 1549 saying that he was sending "a fayre sworde within a sheathe of crymesyn velvet garnysyshyd with perle and stone sett upon sylver and gylte". In 1603 when James VI of Scotland visited York the Bowes sword travelled with one of his entourage to London. When the sword was returned the original precious stones had disappeared and the sword was repaired with semi-precious stones.

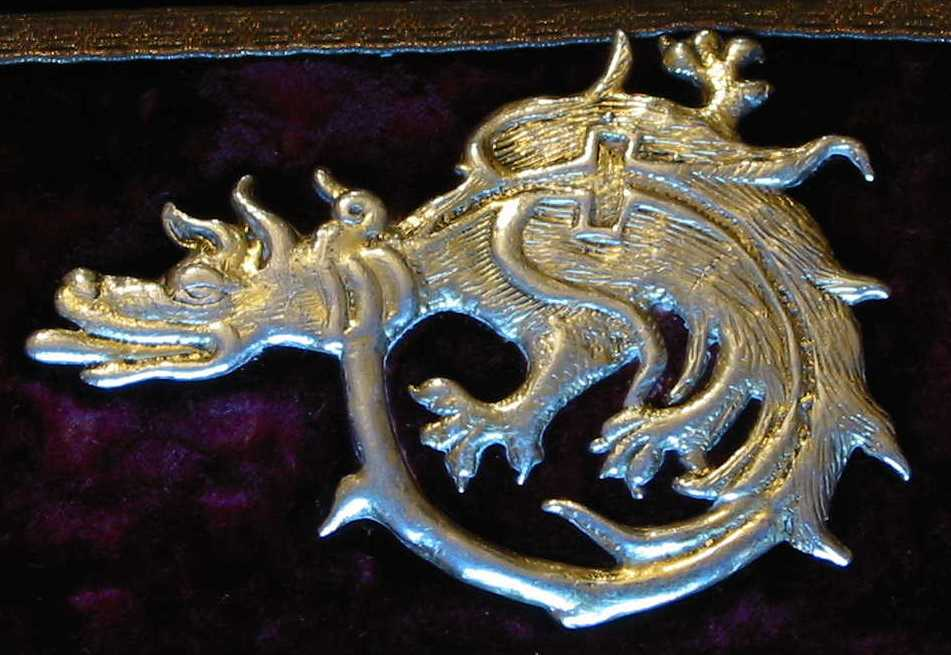
Detail from the Sigismund sword (1416), showing the "dragons"

The Sigismund sword was once owned by Sigismund, Holy Roman Emperor. In 1416 Sigismund was installed as a Knight of the Order of the Garter of the Knights of St. George as part of Henry V's alliance against France. He sent a sword to be hung over his stall in St George's Chapel, Windsor Castle, and this sword was still in the chapel when he died in 1437. The sword was then acquired by Henry Hanslap, dean of Windsor, who was also a canon of Howden and native of York. On 5 May 1439 Henry Hanslapp presented the sword to the City of York. The Sigismund sword blade is blued and inscribed with the Royal Arms of Elizabeth I. The scabbard is covered in crimson velvet which is decorated with "scorpions" or dragons which are similar to the emblem of the knightly Order of the Dragon founded by Sigismund in 1408.

=== Paintings ===
The Mansion House also has a collection of oil paintings of previous Lord Mayors of York which include, George IV as Prince Regent, Charles Watson-Wentworth, 2nd Marquess of Rockingham and George Hudson.

== See also ==
- Grade I listed buildings in the City of York
- Listed buildings in York (within the city walls, northern part)
