= Spital Brook =

Stream in Hertfordshire, England

Coordinates: 51.75023°N 0.01236°W

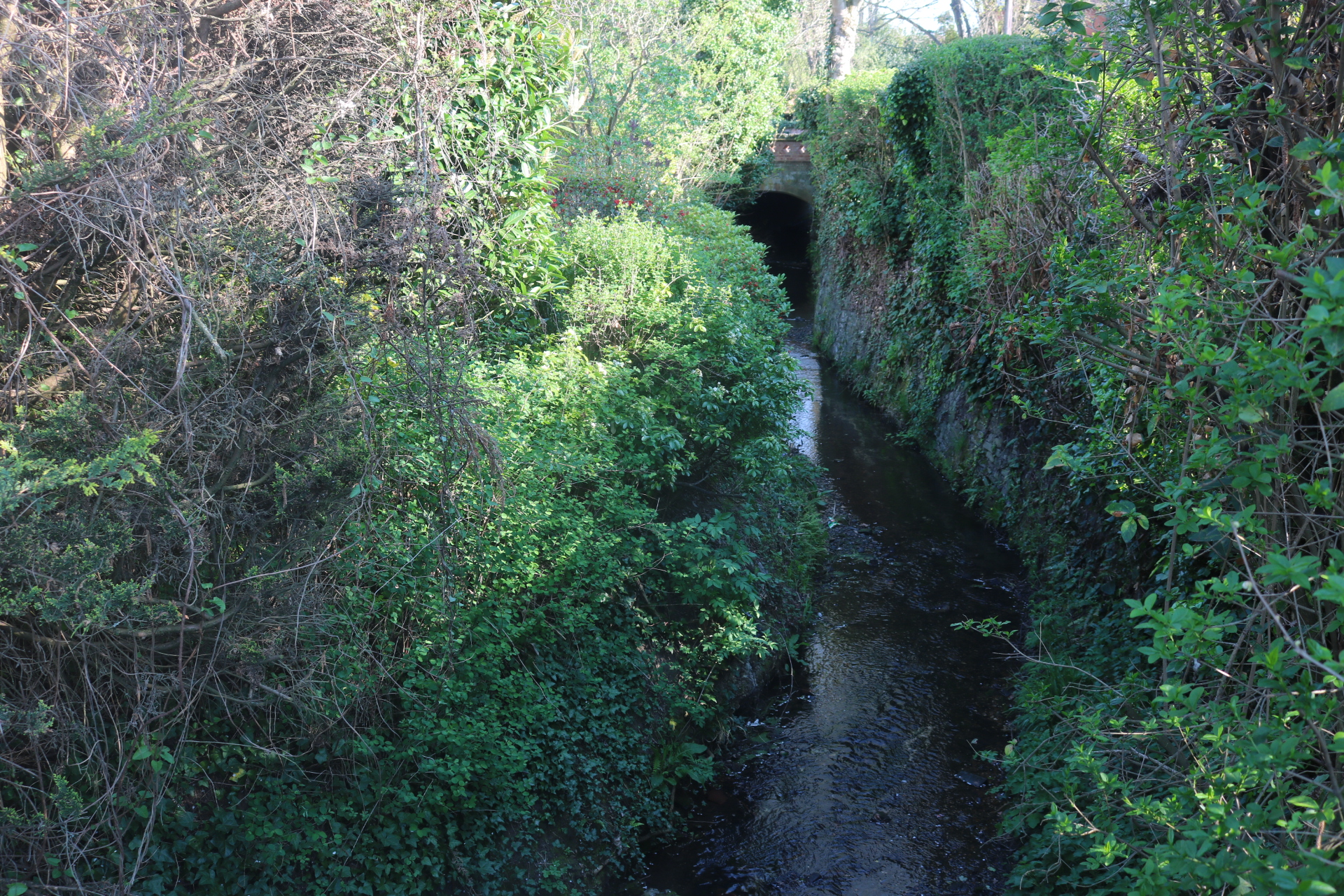
- The Spital Brook in Hoddesdon

Course of the Spital Brook

The Spital Brook is a minor tributary of the River Lea in Hertfordshire, England.

The Spital Brook rises in Hoddesdonpark Wood and flows eastwards, passing through Barclay Park, the former Hoddesdon Common, on its journey to River Lea, while an unnamed parallel stream to the south has been diverted to form ornamental waterbodies located within the former parkland of Broxbournebury. The stream crosses the Roman road, Ermine Street, before going under the A10 and Cock Lane. The original crossing place or ford of Spital Brook in Cock Lane remains and the original route it took ran parallel to the brook in a north–south direction. The brook passes through its namesake area, Spital Brook and marks the traditional boundary between the two parishes of Hoddesdon and Broxbourne. The stream runs parallel to the Lea Valley lines by Broxbourne Station until it meets the River Lea close to Broxbourne Riverside.

Spital Brook's profile is relatively steep for a Hertfordshire water course, and loses approximately 50 metres of height over the 1 kilometre upper section. Due to the brook's small catchment area, unless it is raining heavily, only the lower reach is likely to have water in it.
