= Hoddesdon Town Hall =

Municipal building in Hoddesdon, England

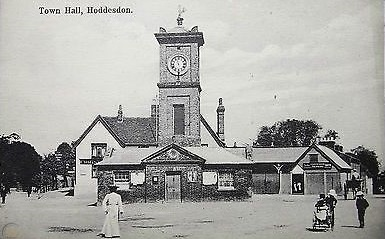
- Hoddesdon Town Hall

- Shown in Hertfordshire
- 51.7617°N 0.0113°W
- Location: High Street, Hoddesdon

History
- Built: 1835

Site notes
- Architect: Thomas Smith
- Architectural style: Neoclassical style

Listed Building – Grade II
- Official name: Clock Tower
- Designated: 8 November 1983
- Reference no.: 1296010

Hoddesdon Town Hall, also known as Hoddesdon Clock House, was a municipal building in the High Street in Hoddesdon, Hertfordshire, England. Except for the clock tower, which survives, the building was demolished in 1967. The clock tower remains a Grade II listed building.

== History ==
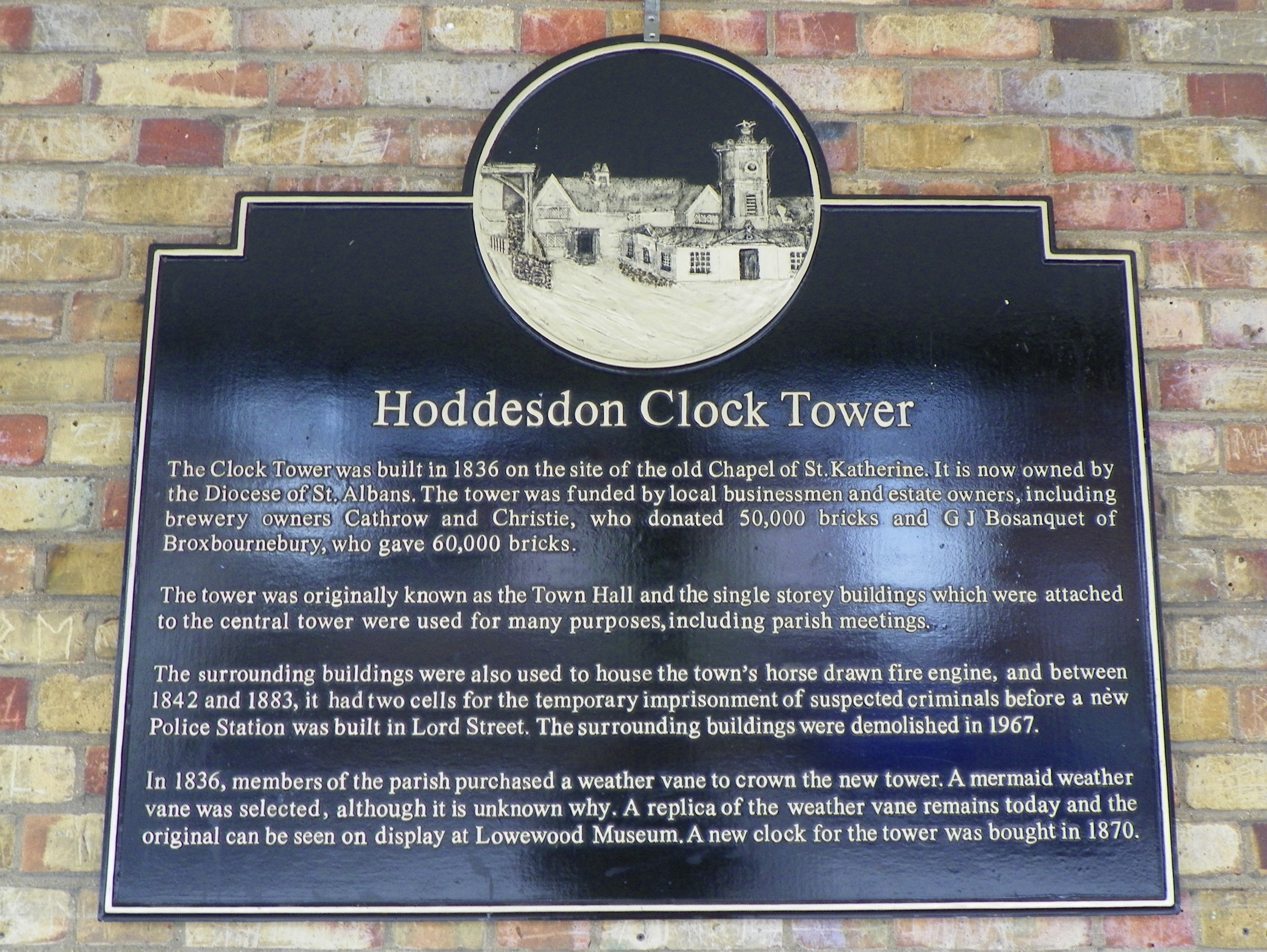
Plaque on the west side of the clock tower

The town hall was commissioned by local businesses, including Christie's Brewery, and estate owners, including George Jacob Bosanquet of Broxbournebury Manor, as a new civic building for town of Hoddesdon. The site chosen was occupied by the remains of St Katharine's Chapel, which dated from the 14th century and was used by pilgrims travelling to the shrine at Walsingham.

The new building was designed by Thomas Smith in the neoclassical style, built in yellow brick and was completed in 1835.

The design involved a symmetrical single storey main frontage of three bays facing south down the High Street. The central bay contained a porch with a single doorway and was surmounted by a pediment with a blind oculus in the tympanum. The outer bays were fenestrated by square-shaped windows and the building was surmounted by a hip roof. Behind the main structure was a three-stage clock tower with diminishing stages. The middle stage featured louvred openings while the third stage featured clock faces. The tower was surmounted by a pyramid-shaped copper roof with a finial. Internally, the principal room was a small assembly room for parish meetings, but there was also space for the local fire engine, a police station and a lock-up for incarcerating petty criminals. The design was criticised by the travel writer, Charles George Harper, who described the town hall in 1905 as an "ugly modern building".

In 1870 a new clock and two quarter bells were provided for the tower by Gillett & Co., but the medieval chapel bell (which had been retained in the new tower) continued to be used for striking the hours. It bears a foundry mark with the initials 'T.B.', believed to be that of Thomas Bullisdon who was making bells in London in the early 16th century. The bell bears a Latin inscription: Sancta Anna Ora Pro Nobis ('Saint Anne pray for us').

The main part of the town hall was demolished in 1967, leaving only the clock tower standing. A canopy was erected around the clock tower in 2003. In the 21st century, the clock tower became the focal point for a series annual concerts entitled "Rock around the Clock Tower".
