= Marmaduke Roydon =

English merchant-adventurer, army officer and colonial planter

Sir Marmaduke Roydon (also Rawdon and Rawden, with Royden a contemporary spelling) (1583 – 28 April 1646) was an English merchant-adventurer and colonial planter, known also as a Royalist army officer.

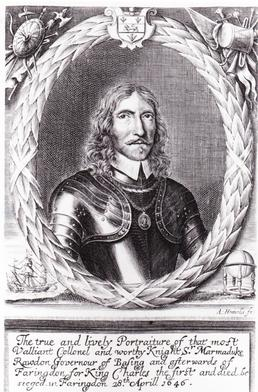
Marmaduke Roydon

== Life ==
The son of Ralph Roydon or Rawdon of Rawden Brandesby in Yorkshire, by Jane, daughter of John Brice of Stillington, he was baptised at Brandesby on 20 March 1583. At sixteen years of age he went to London, where he was apprenticed to Daniel Hall, a Bordeaux merchant, who sent him as his factor to France. He returned to London about 1610 and was elected a common councilman. Soon afterwards he was presented with the freedom of the Clothworkers' Company, and made captain of the city militia.

In 1614 Roydon joined a mercantile venture (with John Buley, George Langam and William Skelton) to the New England coast, sending out two ships under Thomas Hunt and John Smith, which sailed from the Downs on 3 March 1614. He was also interested in the discovery of the Northwest Passage. He was an active member of the Honourable Artillery Company and stood against John Venn for election as captain-leader of the company in 1631; both were disappointed by the imposition of a candidate favoured by the Crown.

Roydon was one of the first planters in Barbados. With two others, he was granted 10,000 acres in Barbados, in April 1628, by James Hay, 1st Earl of Carlisle. This award set off a sharp struggle between Roydon's followers, and those supporting the claims of William Courten. In the end Carlisle's grant was upheld. Roydon, however, is said to have lost £10,000. Roydon also ventured to other parts of the West Indies and to Spain, Turkey and the Canary Islands.

In 1622 Roydon built Rawdon House in Hoddesdon. The year 1626 saw him accused of belonging to a cartel trying to monopolise the wine trade of London. In 1628–9 he became MP for Aldeburgh. In the First English Civil War he fought on the king's side, raised a regiment at his own cost, and took part in the defence of Basing House (1643). On 28 December of the same year he was knighted. In 1645 he was made governor of Faringdon in Berkshire, where he died on 28 April 1646.

== Family ==
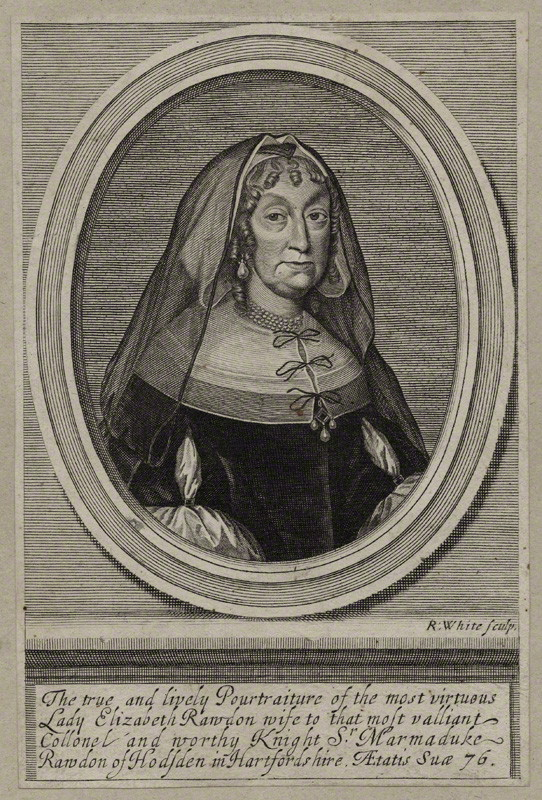
Elizabeth Roydon – engraving by Robert White

In 1611, while a clothworker in All Hallows, Barking, he married Elizabeth, daughter of Thomas Thorowgood of Hoddesdon, Hertfordshire. Their son Thomas fought as a colonel in the Royalist army, and after the battle of Marston Moor went into exile in the Canaries. His nephew, the younger Marmaduke Rawdon, lived in his house for some years from 1626. The poet Martha Moulsworth was Elizabeth's stepmother. Her Memorandum of Martha Moulsworth Widdowe (1632) is believed to have passed in manuscript to Roydon and then his nephew.

== Notes ==
Attribution

This article incorporates text from a publication now in the public domain: Lee, Sidney, ed. (1897). "Roydon, Marmaduke". Dictionary of National Biography. Vol. 49. London: Smith, Elder & Co.
