= Cannix =

Coordinates: 51.747°N 0.023°W

Cannix otherwise Canwykes or Broxbournes, is an area near Broxbourne, Hertfordshire, England. It was named from its early tenants, and was held of the manor of Stevenage by military service. It seems to have been identical with the messuage and virgate held of the Abbot of Westminster in 1315 by John de Broxbourne.

Nothing more is heard of the estate until about 1509, when William Canwyke paid a relief of 40s. for certain land in Stevenage called ' Broxborne' which he had received from Petronilla, his mother. In 1510 Samuel and Clemence Canwyke sold the 'manor' to William Lytton of Knebworth, who died seised of it in 1517.

Eventually, the whole estate returned to the male line of the Lyttons and descended in the same manner as Knebworth. It is mentioned in 1811 after which its identity was probably lost among the other lands held by the Lyttons in Stevenage. Cannocks Wood in the southwest of the parish perhaps preserves its name.
