= William Josiah Irons =

British theologian

William Josiah Irons (1812–1883) was a priest in the Church of England and a theological writer.

== Life ==
Irons, born at Hoddesdon, Hertfordshire, 12 September 1812, was second son of the Rev. Joseph Irons (1785–1852), by his first wife, Mary Ann, daughter of William Broderick. His mother died in 1828. His father, a popular evangelical preacher, born at Ware, Hertfordshire, on 5 November 1785, commenced preaching in March 1808 under the auspices of the London Itinerant Society, was ordained an independent minister on 21 May 1814, was stationed at Hoddesdon from 1812 to 1815, and at Sawston, near Cambridge, from 1815 to 1818, and was minister of Grove Chapel, Camberwell, Surrey, from 1818 until his death at Camberwell on 3 April 1852.

William Josiah, after being educated at home, matriculated from Queen's College, Oxford, on 12 May 1829, and graduated B.A. 1833, M.A. 1835, BD 1842, and DD 1854. He was curate of St. Mary, Newington Butts, Surrey, from 1835 till 1837, when he was presented to the living of St. Peter's, Walworth. He became vicar of Barkway in Hertfordshire in 1838, vicar of Brompton, Middlesex, 17 September 1840, prebendary of St Paul's Cathedral December 1860, rector of Waddingham, Lincolnshire, 6 April 1870, and on 7 June 1872 rector of St. Mary Woolnoth with St. Mary Woolchurch-Haw in the city of London, on the presentation of William Ewart Gladstone, the then Prime Minister of the United Kingdom. In 1870 he was Bampton lecturer at Oxford, and his published lectures, Christianity as taught by St. Paul, reached a second edition in 1876. He died at 20 Gordon Square, London, on 18 June 1883. He married first, in 1839, Ann, eldest daughter of John Melhuish of Upper Tooting, who died 14 July 1853; and secondly, on 28 December 1854, Sarah Albinia Louisa, youngest daughter of Sir Lancelot Shadwell; she died 15 December 1887.

== Works ==
Irons's chief work is the Analysis of Human Responsibility, 1869, written at the request of the founders of the Victoria Institute. There Irons lectured on Darwin's Origin of Species, on Tyndall's Fragments of Science, on Mill's Essay on Theism, and on the Unseen Universe. For the volume of Replies to Essays and Reviews he wrote, in 1862, The Idea of a National Church. He zealously defended church establishment in a series of works, of which the earliest was a pamphlet called The Present Crisis, published in 1850, and the latest a series of letters entitled The Charge of Erastianism. In 1855 appeared a pamphlet signed A. E., entitled Is the Vicar of Brompton a Tractarian? He was an advocate of free and compulsory education, and suggested an entire modification of the Poor Law. He was one of the editors of the Tracts of the Anglican Church, 1842, and of the Literary Churchman. In the latter he wrote the leading articles from May 1855 to December 1861. He translated the Dies Iræ of Thomas of Celano in the well-known hymn commencing Day of wrath! O day of mourning!.

Irons wrote, besides the works mentioned and single sermons and addresses:

1. On the Whole Doctrine of Final Causes, 1836.
2. On the Holy Catholic Church, parochial lectures, three series, 1837–47.
3. Our Blessed Lord regarded in his Earthly Relationship, four sermons, 1844.
4. Notes of the Church, 1845; third edit. 1846.
5. The Theory of Development examined, 1846.
6. Fifty-two Propositions: A Letter to the Rev. Dr. Hampden, 1848.
7. The Christian Servant's Book, 1849.
8. The Judgments on Baptismal Regeneration, 1850.
9. The Preaching of Christ, 1853.
10. The Miracles of Christ, a series of sermons, 1859.
11. The Bible and its Interpreters, 1865; 2nd edit., 1869.
12. On Miracles and Prophecy, 1867.
13. The Sacred Life of Jesus Christ. Taken in Order from the Gospels, 1867.
14. The Sacred Words of Jesus Christ. Taken in Order from the Gospels, 1868.
15. Considerations on taking Holy Orders, 1872.
16. The Church of all Ages, 1875.
17. Psalms and Hymns for the Church, 1875; another edit., 1883.
18. Occasional Sermons, chiefly preached at St. Paul's, seven parts, 1876.
