= Henry Hanslap =

Harry Hanslap (also Hanslope) (d. 1452) was a Canon of Windsor from 1437 to 1452.

== Career ==
He was appointed:

- Prebendary of Darlington 1440
- Prebendary of Skipworth in Howden
- Prebendary of Stow Longa in Lincoln 1448 – 1452
- Rector of Middleton Cheney, Northamptonshire until 1452

He was appointed to the eleventh stall in St George's Chapel, Windsor Castle in 1437 and held the canonry until 1452.

On the death of Sigismund, Holy Roman Emperor in 1437 his sword of 1416 was given to him by the Dean, and Hanslap gave this to the Mayor of York. It is now York's great sword of state and currently displayed in the Mansion House, York.
