= Marmaduke Rawdon (antiquary) =

English factor and antiquary

Marmaduke Rawdon (1610 – 7 February 1669) was an English factor and antiquary.

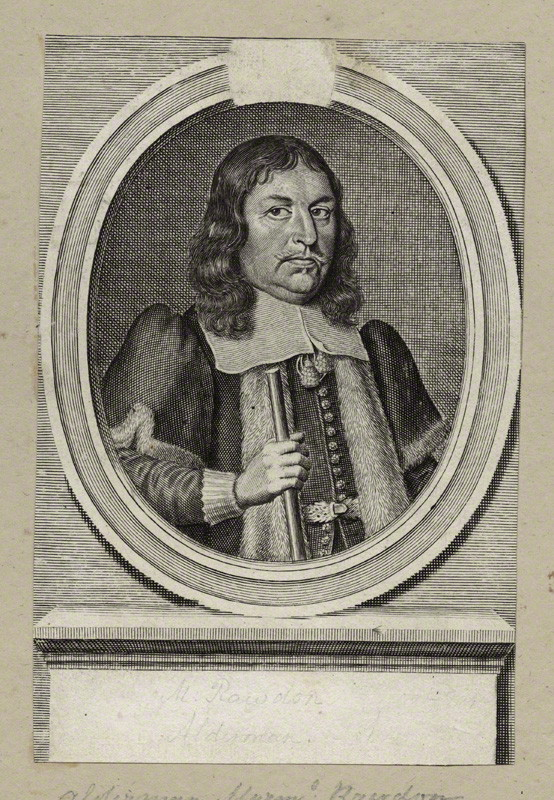
Marmaduke Rawdon

== Life ==
He was the youngest son of Laurence Rawdon, merchant and alderman of York, by Margery, daughter of William Barton of Cawton, Yorkshire. He was baptised in the church of St. Crux, York, on 17 March 1610, and received his education in the grammar school of St. Peter in that city. On the death of his father in 1624 he was adopted by his uncle Marmaduke Roydon, a prominent London merchant.

In 1627 Rawdon was sent to Holland as supercargo of a small merchant vessel, and then for a time was stationed at Bordeaux. In 1631 he was factor for his uncle in Tenerife, and he was in the Canary Islands, with brief intervals, for over 20 years.

During his long residence at La Laguna in Gran Canaria Rawdon ascended Mount Teide. The route he took to the summit of the volcano was the same as that followed by George Glas a century later, and by Alexander von Humboldt.

In 1655, after England's diplomatic rupture with Spain, Rawdon returned to England. and during most of the rest of his life he resided with his kinsman Marmaduke Rawdon, at Hoddesdon, Hertfordshire. He visited Dunkirk in 1662, ahead of its sale to France. He invested in the Canary Company in 1664.

Rawdon died, unmarried, at Hoddesdon, on 7 February 1669, and was buried in the chancel of the church at Broxbourne. By his will he left to the corporation of York a gold loving cup, and money to purchase a gold chain for the lady mayoress of York.

== Works ==
Rawdon made extensive manuscript collections, compiled a brief history of cathedrals, and prepared for the press a genealogical memoir of his family. Nearly half a century after his death his manuscripts were in the possession of Samuel Bagnall of London (his wife was the granddaughter of Colonel Thomas Rawdon, the eldest son of Sir Marmaduke Rawdon). In 1712 Ralph Thoresby saw the collection, and extracts from some of the manuscripts were in his Ducatus Leodiensis, and in the notice of Sir George Rawdon which Edmund Gibson introduced into his edition of William Camden's Britannia. When Thomas Wotton was collecting materials for his Baronetage (1741), the Rawdon manuscripts were still in Bagnall's possession, but their subsequent history is unknown.

Robert Davies edited for the Camden Society The Life of Marmaduke Rawdon of York, or Marmaduke Rawdon, the second of that name. Now first printed from the original MS. in the possession of Robert Cooke, esq., F.R.G.S. (1863). This memoir presents sketches of social and domestic life and manners, during the seventeenth century. The original manuscript is now in the British Library (Addit. MS. 34206).

== Notes ==
Attribution

This article incorporates text from a publication now in the public domain: Lee, Sidney, ed. (1896). "Rawdon, Marmaduke". Dictionary of National Biography. Vol. 47. London: Smith, Elder & Co.
