= Barclay Park =

Park in Hoddesdon, Hertfordshire, England

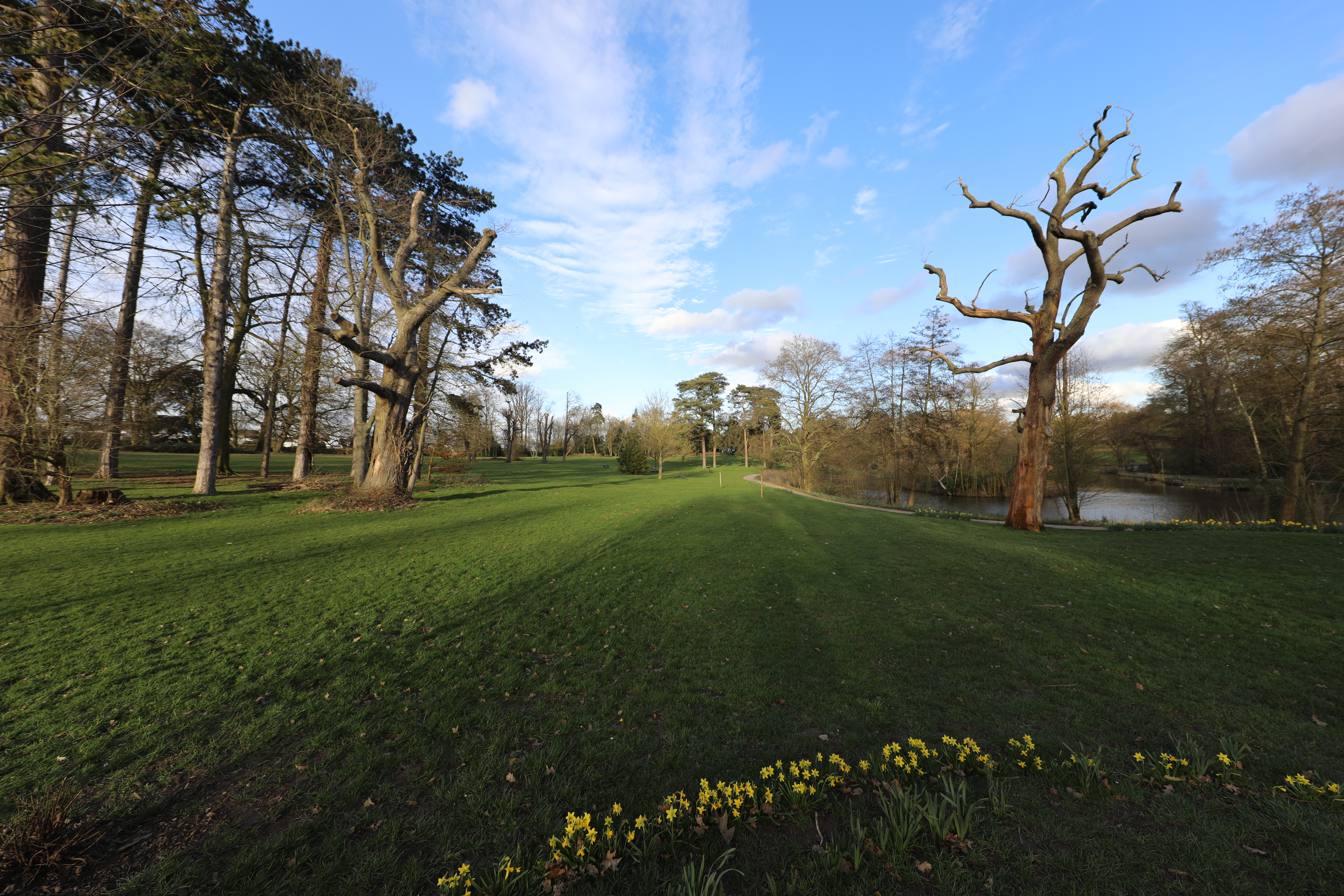
- Interactive map of Barclay Park
- Location: Hoddesdon, Hertfordshire, England
- Coordinates: 51.7584°N 0.0241°W
- Open: All year

Barclay Park is a park in Hoddesdon, Hertfordshire, England.

== History ==
In 1403 there was a house on the land called High Wyches which by 1677 had been renamed to High Grounds. In 1871 the house and estate was bought by Robert Buchanan Barclay and it was renamed to High Leigh. In 1935 the Barclay family gifted part of the grounds of the house to the public for the silver jubilee celebrations of King George V. The park includes a lake and bridge which was laid out in the 1870s by James Pulham and Son an international firm of landscape designers in this era. The park was officially opened on 12 May 1937. After Robert Barclay's death in 1921 the property passed to his son, Robert Leatham Barclay, and he sold the house and forty acres to a company of which he was a director, First Conference Estate Ltd, which provided conference facilities for churches and Christian groups and also ran The Hayes conference centre in Derbyshire. That company morphed into a charity (The Christian Conference Trust) in 1996 and continues to provide meeting facilities for a wide range of users, including churches, other charities, local businesses and public bodies from around the country. High Leigh Conference Centre celebrates its centenary in 2022.

== Facilities ==
The facilities include an ornamental lake, walking routes, a children's play area, a woodland, Spital brook, a meadow, picnicking, and two Pulham Bridges over the brook. Barclay Parkrun takes place every Saturday morning. The park was given a Green Flag Award and has an area of 18 acres.
