= Rye House power station =

Gas power station in Hoddesdon, Hertfordshire

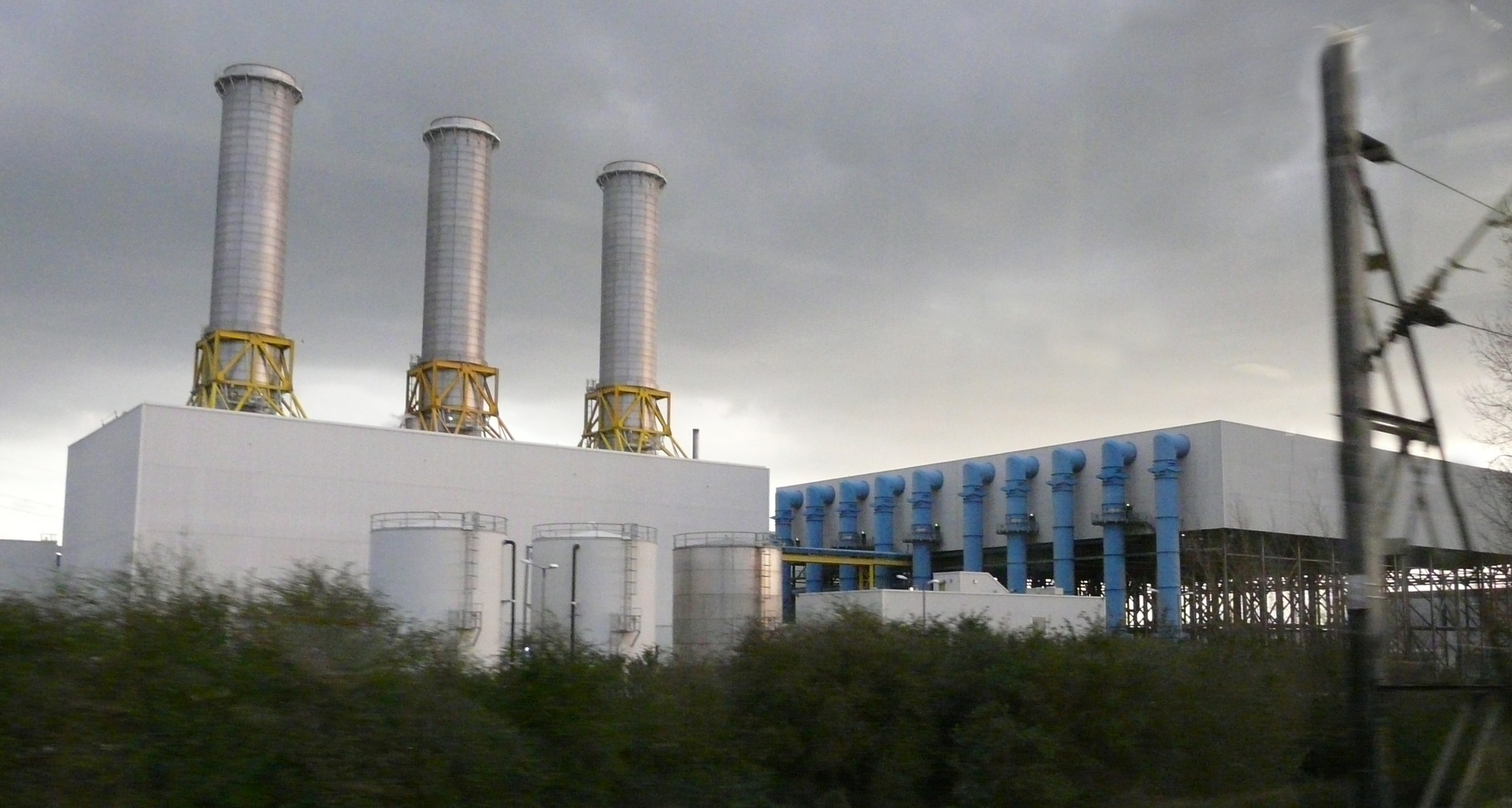
- Rye House Power Station
- Country: England
- Location: Hertfordshire, East of England
- Coordinates: 51.763°N 0.009°E
- Status: Operational
- Construction began: Early 1990s
- Commission date: November 1993
- Operator: Vitol

Thermal power station
- Primary fuel: Natural gas

Power generation
- Nameplate capacity: 715 MW

External links
- Commons: Related media on Commons

Rye House Power Station is a 715 MW combined cycle gas turbine (CCGT) power station located near Rye House railway station in Hoddesdon, Hertfordshire.

== History ==
The current station was built on the site of an earlier 128 MW coal-fired power station built in 1951, and an open cycle gas turbine plant commissioned in 1965 (see below). Both these stations were closed on 1 November 1982 and were subsequently demolished.

The gas-fired station, near Hoddesdon, is about eighteen miles north of London, was built in the early 1990s and fully commissioned in November 1993 and officially opened in April 1994. Output from the station is enough to meet the daily power needs of nearly a million people - almost the population of Hertfordshire.

Rye House is owned and operated by VPI, part of the Vitol group.

== Specification ==
Rye House was built by Siemens AG. It has three Siemens V94.2 gas turbines rotating at 3000 rpm. Each drives a generator producing 150 MW at a terminal voltage of 11 kV and exhausts at 540 °C into a Babcock Energy steam generator. The three steam generators supply a single Siemens turbogenerator producing 250 MW at 15.75 kV. The combined outputs feed the National Grid at 400 kV. The station has the largest air-cooled condenser in Europe. The chimneys are 58 m high. The station employs thirty-seven people.

== Previous power stations ==
Rye House power station
- Country: United Kingdom
- Location: Rye Park, Hertfordshire
- Status: Decommissioned and demolished
- Construction began: 1950
- Commission date: 1951 (coal-fired), 1965 (gas turbine)
- Decommission date: 1 November 1982
- Owners: British Electricity Authority (1948–1955); Central Electricity Authority (1955–1957); Central Electricity Generating Board (1958–1982)
- Operator: By owner

Thermal power station
- Primary fuel: Coal, fuel oil
- Turbine technology: Steam turbines and open cycle gas turbines
- Chimneys: 1
- Cooling towers: 3
- Cooling source: River water and cooling towers
- Combined cycle?: No

Power generation
- Units operational: 4 × 32 MW turbo-alternators, 2 × 70 MW gas turbines
- Units decommissioned: All
- Nameplate capacity: 128 MW + 140 MW
- Annual net output: (See graphs)

External links
- Commons: Related media on Commons

The first station on the site was originally planned by the Northmet Power Co with a 192 MW capacity. Construction of the station was deferred during the war and it was not until 1947 that work on site could be initiated by the now British Electricity Authority. The station was first provided power in 1951 and by 1954 4 x 32 MW turbo-alternator sets had been installed. The station was located between the London to Cambridge railway line and the Lee Navigation, providing access for the delivery of coal and a water supply for condensing steam in the plant. The building was designed by the architect Sir Giles Gilbert Scott in a steel-framed, brick-clad ‘cathedral of power’ style exemplified by Scott's Battersea and Bankside power stations.

The station had single 260ft chimney and three reinforced concrete cooling towers. Each tower had a capacity of 1.3 million gallons per hour (1.64 m^{3}/s). A dock was built on the Lee Navigation adjacent to the power station for unloading coal in addition to the railway sidings.

The station comprised four 30 MW Richardsons Westgarth-Parsons turbo-alternators, generating at 33 kV. These were supplied with steam from four 350,000 lb/hr Babcock pulverised fired coal boilers at 600 psi (41.4 bar) and 454 °C.

In 1965, an open cycle gas turbine power station was built adjacent to the steam station. This comprised two 70 MW oil-fired gas turbine/generator sets. This was a peak shaving plant designed to operate at times of maximum demand.

The output from the steam plant and the gas turbine plant are shown in the following charts.

Rye House (steam) power station output 1954–1982 in GWh
Rye House (gas turbine) power station output 1965–1982 in GWh

Rye House power station was decommissioned on 1 November 1982. It was subsequently demolished and then replaced by the CCGT station.

== See also ==
- Energy policy of the United Kingdom
- Energy use and conservation in the United Kingdom
