= Robert Davies (antiquary, died 1875) =

English lawyer and antiquarian

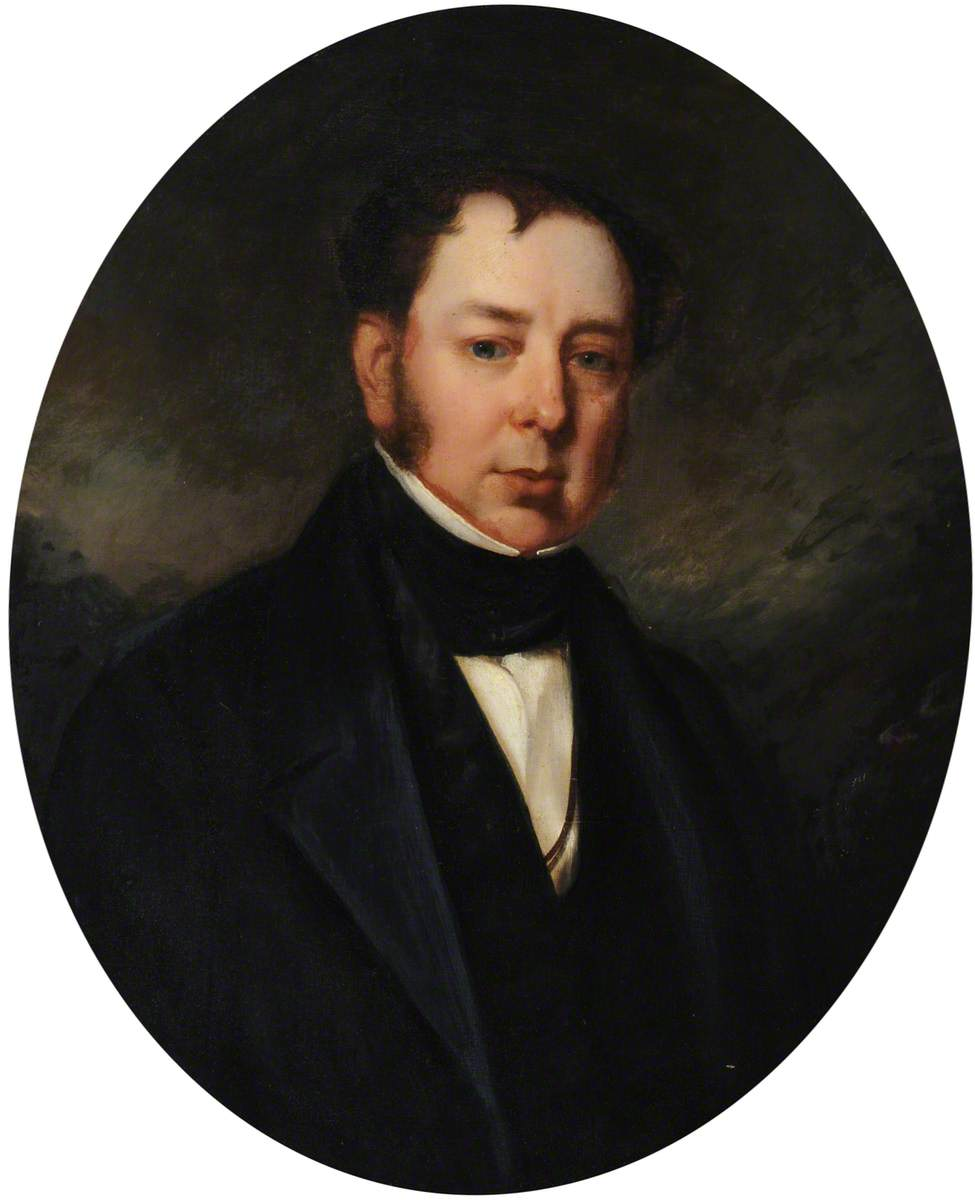
Robert Davies

Robert Davies (1793–1875) was an English lawyer and antiquarian, known for his works on the city of York.

== Life ==
The eldest son of Peter Davies, by his wife Ann, daughter of Robert Rhodes, he was born at York on 19 August 1793, and educated at St. Peter's Royal Grammar School in the city. Admitted a solicitor in 1814, he practised for many years in York, and was town clerk there from 1827 until 1848. He was in partnership with John Bayldon from 1829 to 1834. After his retirement from business he was elected a magistrate.

Davies was elected a member of the Society of Antiquaries of London on 22 December 1842. He died at his residence, The Mount, in the city of York, on 23 August 1875, and was buried in the cemetery on 29 August.

== Works ==
Davies was better known as an antiquary than as a lawyer. He read papers before the Yorkshire Philosophical Society on the streets, churches, public buildings, houses, privileges, and other antiquities of York.

Davies was the author or editor of:

- The Freeman's Roll of the City of York, 1835.
- Extracts from the Municipal Records of the City of York, 1843.
- The Fawkes's of York in the Sixteenth Century, 1850.
- Notices of the Royal and Archiepiscopal Mints and Coinages at York, 1854.
- Pope: additional facts concerning his maternal ancestry, 1858.
- The Visitation of the County of York, Surtees Soc. 1859.
- The Life of Marmaduke Rawdon, Camden Soc. 1863; edited manuscript biography of Marmaduke Rawdon the younger; according to Davies it was compiled from Rawdon's own notes, by someone who knew him in the Canary Islands.
- A Memoir of the York Press, 1868.
- Walks through the City of York. By R. Davies, edited by his widow, Elizabeth Davies, 1880.

== Family ==
Davies married in 1826 Elizabeth, youngest daughter of George Cattle of York.

== Notes ==
Attribution

This article incorporates text from a publication now in the public domain: Stephen, Leslie, ed. (1888). "Davies, Robert (1793-1875)". Dictionary of National Biography. Vol. 14. London: Smith, Elder & Co.
