= Rawdon House =

House in Hoddesdon, Hertfordshire, England

Coordinates: 51.75777°N 0.01208°W

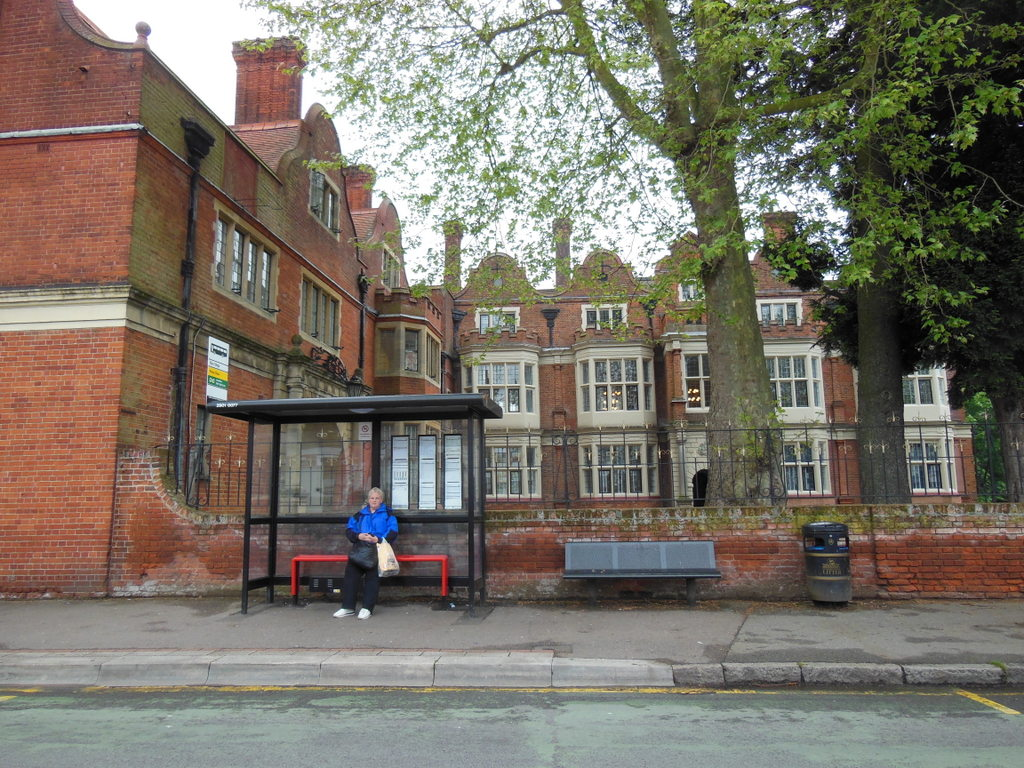
Rawdon House

Rawdon House is a former residence in the High Street of Hoddesdon, Hertfordshire, England. It was built as a house in 1622 by Marmaduke Rawdon, and extended in 1879. The Jacobean and Victorian wings of the building are Grade II* listed. In 1898 it became St Monica's Priory, a convent of Augustinian canonesses, a use that lasted to 1969, since when it has been converted for use as offices.

Guilielma Maria Penn, wife of William Penn, died in Hoddesdon in 1694, and tradition has it that she was staying then at Rawdon House.

== History ==
The east wing of the present building was originally built as Hoddesdon House for Marmaduke Rawdon. He was a prominent wine merchant, Master of the London Clothworkers Company, Member of Parliament and friend of King James I, who visited his house from time to time. Although fighting in the Civil War on the Royalist side, the Rawdon family were nevertheless able to hold on to the property throughout the Commonwealth, after which it passed by marriage in 1734 to Richard Plomer. It was subsequently let to a series of tenants, including John Dymoke, the King's Champion.

In 1840 the house was bought by the Quaker John Warner, an educational reformer, who rented it to Sarah Stickney Ellis to establish the Rawdon House School for young ladies there, which moved away in 1865. The next owner, Henry Ricardo, commissioned architects Ernest George and Harold Peto to design a north wing to the house, at right angles to the original block, which was completed in 1879. In 1898 the house became St Monica's Priory, run by nuns of the Order of St Augustine. At this point 'the best C17 fittings were taken out' including 'fireplaces now at Rothamsted Manor'. After the priory relocated itself nearby in 1969, the empty building was eventually converted into offices. Nikolaus Pevsner states that this occurred in 1974-5 when it was converted by Rialto Builders.
