= Harriet Auber =

English poet and hymnist (1773–1862)

- Born: 4 October 1773; Spitalfields, Middlesex, England
- Died: 20 January 1862 (aged 88); Hoddesdon, Hertfordshire, England
- Resting place: Hoddesdon
- Occupations: poet, hymnist
- Partner: Mary Jane McKenzie
- Writing career
- Language: English
- Genres: poems, hymns
- Notable works: The Spirit of the Psalms: Or, a Compressed Version of Select Portions of the Psalms of David, Adapted to Christian Worship

Harriet Auber (4 October 1773 — 20 January 1862) was an English poet and hymnist. She is best remembered for her collection The Spirit of the Psalms, published in 1829, and for her hymn "Our blest Redeemer, ere he breathed," a treatise on the Holy Spirit and his work.

== Early years ==
Henriette ("Harriet") Auber was born in Spitalfields, London, on 4 October 1773. Her actual name was Henriette, but she was known as Harriet. She was the daughter of James Auber, of Hackney, a Church of England clergyman. The family was of French Protestant extraction, and probably of the same lineage as the musical composer Daniel Francois Esprit Auber.

== Career ==
Auber lived in a quiet and secluded home, first at Broxbourne, and then at Hoddesdon, Hertfordshire, with her sisters. She occupied much of her time in poetic composition, most of which remained unpublished. She had a large circle of relatives and friends.

In 1829 The Spirit of the Psalms; or, a Compressed Version of Select Portions of the Psalms of David was published at London anonymously. Several of these Psalms were transferred to the Church Psalmody, Boston, 1831, and other collections, where they were credited to the Spirit of the Psalms. In 1834, Rev. Henry Francis Lyte's book appeared, also entitled The Spirit of the Psalms. Led simply by the title, and not aware that the two books were entirely different, or that there were two books of the same name, subsequent compilers credited these hymns to Rev. Lyte. However, the earlier work was the production of Auber, published when she was 56. It contains a few selections from well-known authors, to some of which the names are attached; the larger part of the pieces, however, were written by Auber.

== Later years ==
During the latter years of her life, Auber lived with her valued friend, Miss Mary Jane McKenzie, the author of the tale "Private Life" as well as "Lectures on the Parables" and "Lectures on the Miracles". Auber died on 20 January 1862, at the age of 88, at her residence in Hoddesdon, Hertfordshire. She was buried there beside McKenzie, whom she had survived a few years.
