= Virginia Felicia Auber =

Spanish woman of letters (1825–1897)

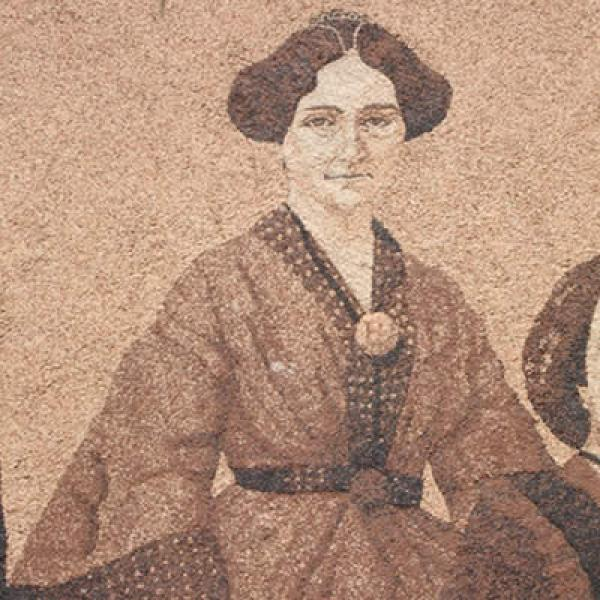
Undated portrait

Virginia Felicia Auber (1825–1897) was a Spanish author who lived for many years in Cuba.

== Life ==
Virginia was born in Coruña, Spain, in 1825. She went to Cuba in 1833 and resided there until 1873, when she returned to Europe.

She wrote much under the pen name "Felicia", and published several novels, including:

- Perseverancia,
- Otros tiempos,
- Un amor misterioso,
- Una habanera.

She died in Madrid on 20 March 1897.
