= Broxbournebury Manor =

Coordinates: 51.746°N 0.039°W

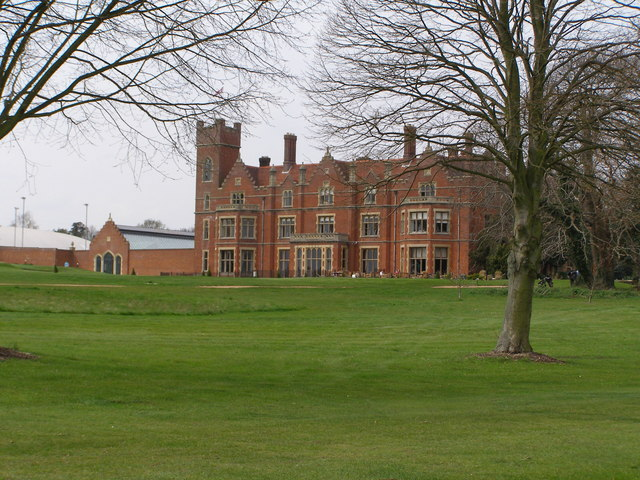
Hertfordshire Golf and Country Club

Broxbournebury Manor is a country club in Broxbourne, Hertfordshire, England. It is a building of historical significance and is listed on the English Heritage Register. It was originally a courtyard house built in the 16th Century with major alterations and additions in the 18th and 19th Centuries.

== The Cocke family ==
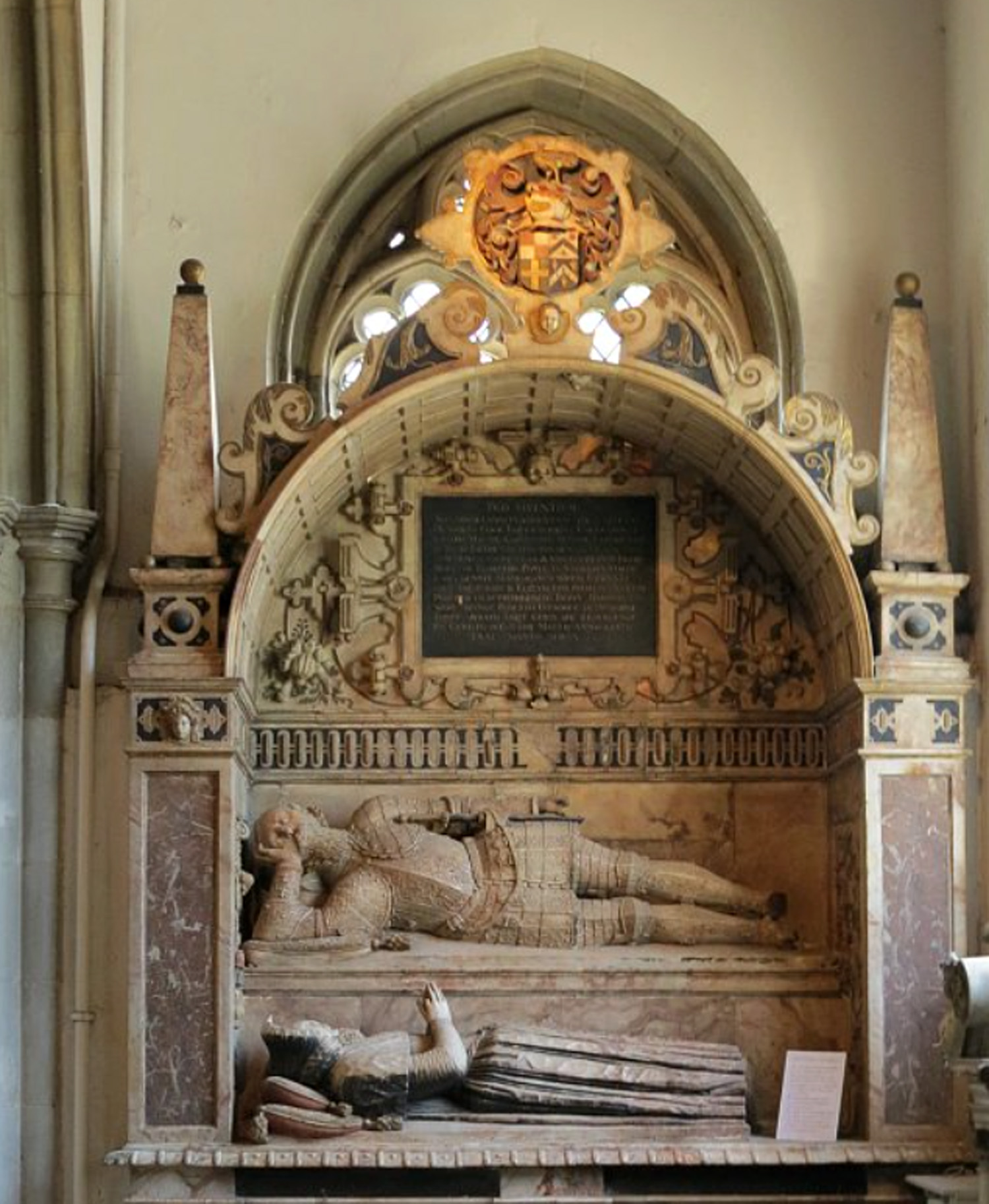
Monument to Sir Henry Cocke and his wife Ursula

The Cocke family built Broxbournebury Manor in about 1550. It is not certain whether it was John Cocke or his son Sir Henry Cocke (1538–1609) who built it. John Cocke (1506–1557) was granted the Broxbourne Manor by Henry VIII in 1544. John died in 1557 and left the property to his wife Anne and when she died she left it to her son Sir Henry Cocke. He was a person of importance in the household of Queen Elizabeth.

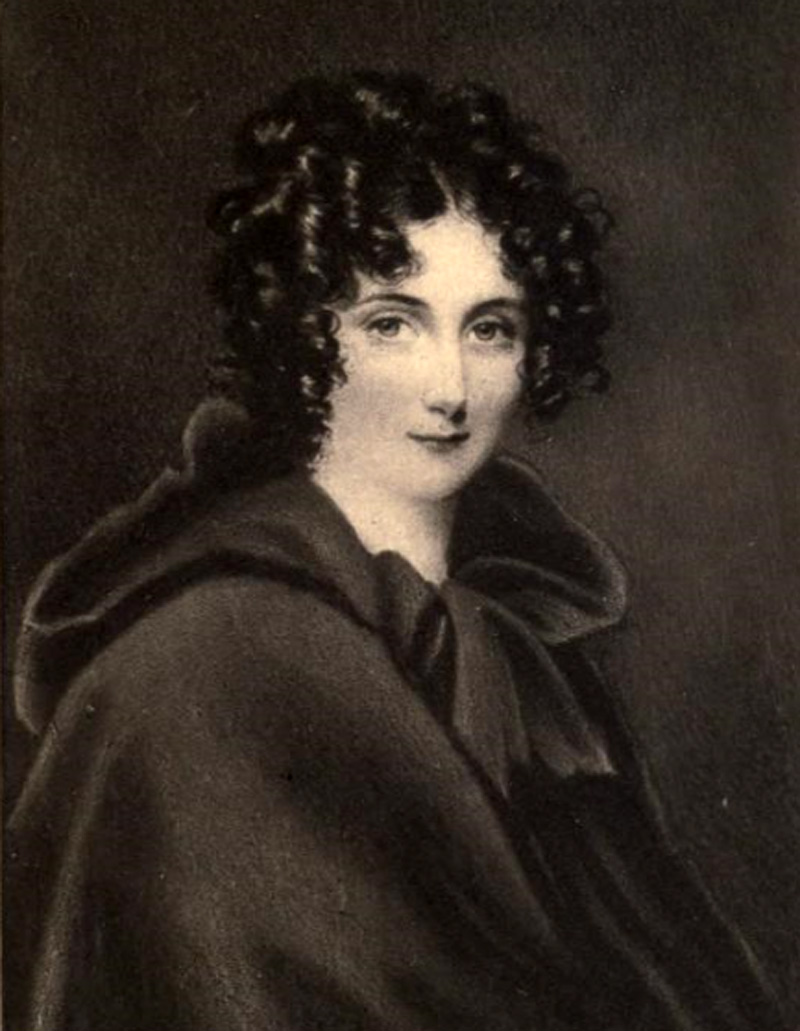
Cecilia Bosanquet who established the rose garden

Jacob Bosanquet bought the house at the time of his marriage in 1790 t. When Jacob died in 1828 his eldest son George inherited the house. In 1813 he married his cousin Cecilia Franks (1789–1868) She was a keen gardener and her rose garden was often mentioned in publications. One book described Broxbournebury as a “celebrated mansion and remarkable for a unique rose garden”. In 1832 a rose called “Mrs Bosanquet” was named after her. This rose still exists today. The couple had one daughter, Cecilia. When George died in 1866 his daughter and her husband Horace James Smith inherited the house. Horace added the name Bosanquet to his name at the time of the inheritance.

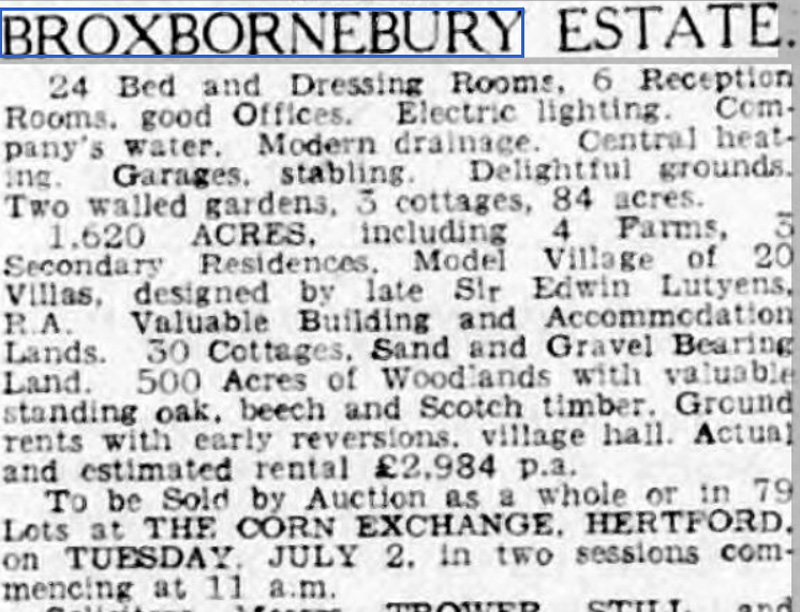
Advertisement for the sale of the Broxbournebury Estate in 1946.

In 1878 Horace commissioned Sir Ernest George to make considerable alterations and additions to the house.

The house and some of the land was bought by Hertfordshire County Council in 1946. It was sold later to become the Hertfordshire Golf and Country Club.
