= Broxbourne =

Town in Hertfordshire, England

Coordinates: 51.7495°N 0.0216°W

- Town
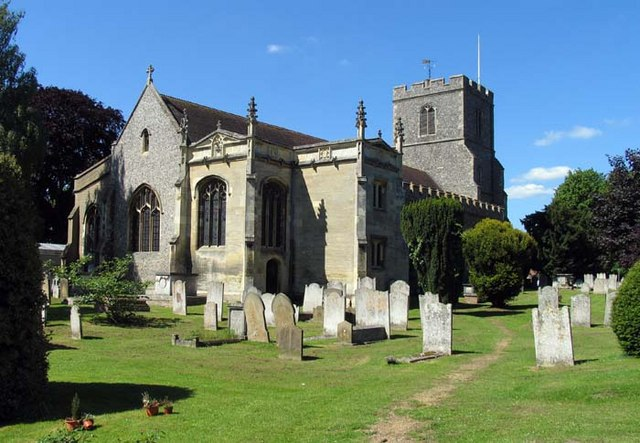
- Church of St Augustine

- Location within Hertfordshire
- Population: 15,303; 15,303 (2011. 2 Broxbourne Wards)
- OS grid reference: TL365075
- District: Broxbourne
- Shire county: Hertfordshire
- Region: East
- Country: England
- Sovereign state: United Kingdom
- Post town: BROXBOURNE
- Postcode district: EN10
- Dialling code: 01992
- Police: Hertfordshire
- Fire: Hertfordshire
- Ambulance: East of England
- UK Parliament: Broxbourne

Broxbourne is a town in the Borough of Broxbourne in Hertfordshire, England, with a population of 15,303 at the 2011 Census. It is located to the south of Hoddesdon and to the north of Cheshunt, 17 miles (27 km) north of London. The town is near the River Lea, which forms the boundary with Essex, and 5 miles (8.0 km) north of the M25 motorway. To the west of the town are Broxbourne Woods, a national nature reserve. The Prime Meridian runs just east of Broxbourne.

== Name ==
The name is believed to derive from the Old English words brocc and burna meaning Badger stream.

== History ==
Broxbourne grew around inns on the Great Cambridge Road, now known as the A10. A number of old houses and inns dating from the 16th to the 19th centuries still line the High Street (now the A1170). The Hertfordshire Golf and Country Club is a 16th Century house with later alterations and additions.

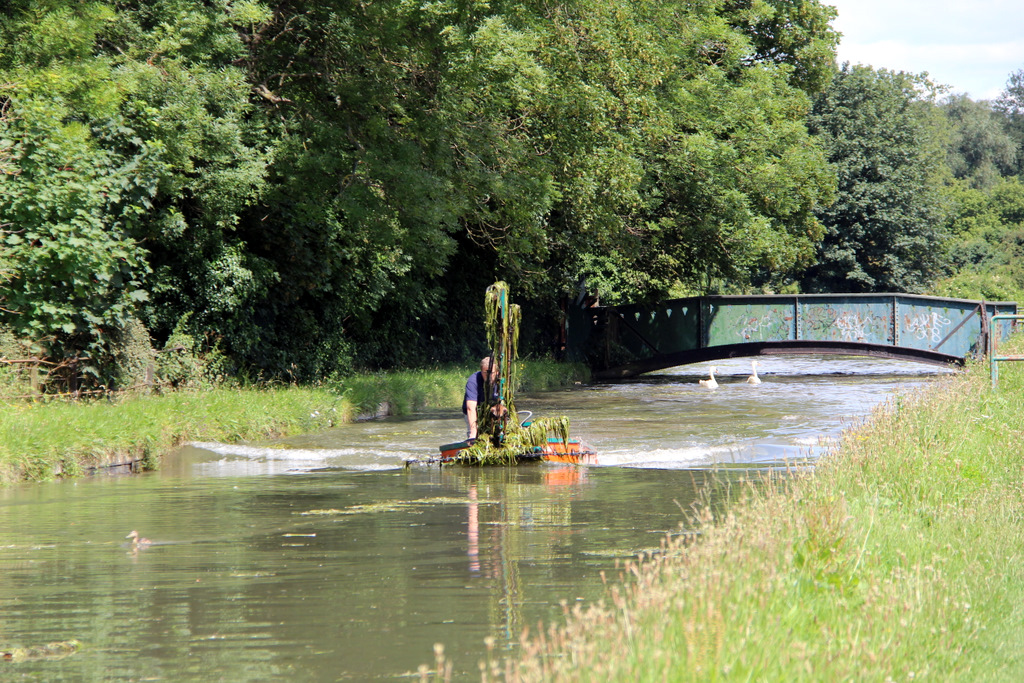
The New River

The Manor of Broxbourne has an entry in the Domesday Book as Brochtsborne, where Broxbourne Mill is listed. The manor was held in the time of Edward the Confessor by Stigand, the Archbishop of Canterbury, but had passed into Norman hands following the Conquest. King John granted the manor to the Knights Hospitallers until the Dissolution, when it passed to John Cock, after whose family Cock Lane is named.

The parish church of St Augustine was entirely rebuilt in the 15th century, although a 12th-century Purbeck marble font survives. The interior has a number of monuments and brasses dating from the 15th to the 19th centuries. The three stage tower has a belfry with a peal of eight bells, three of which are dated 1615.

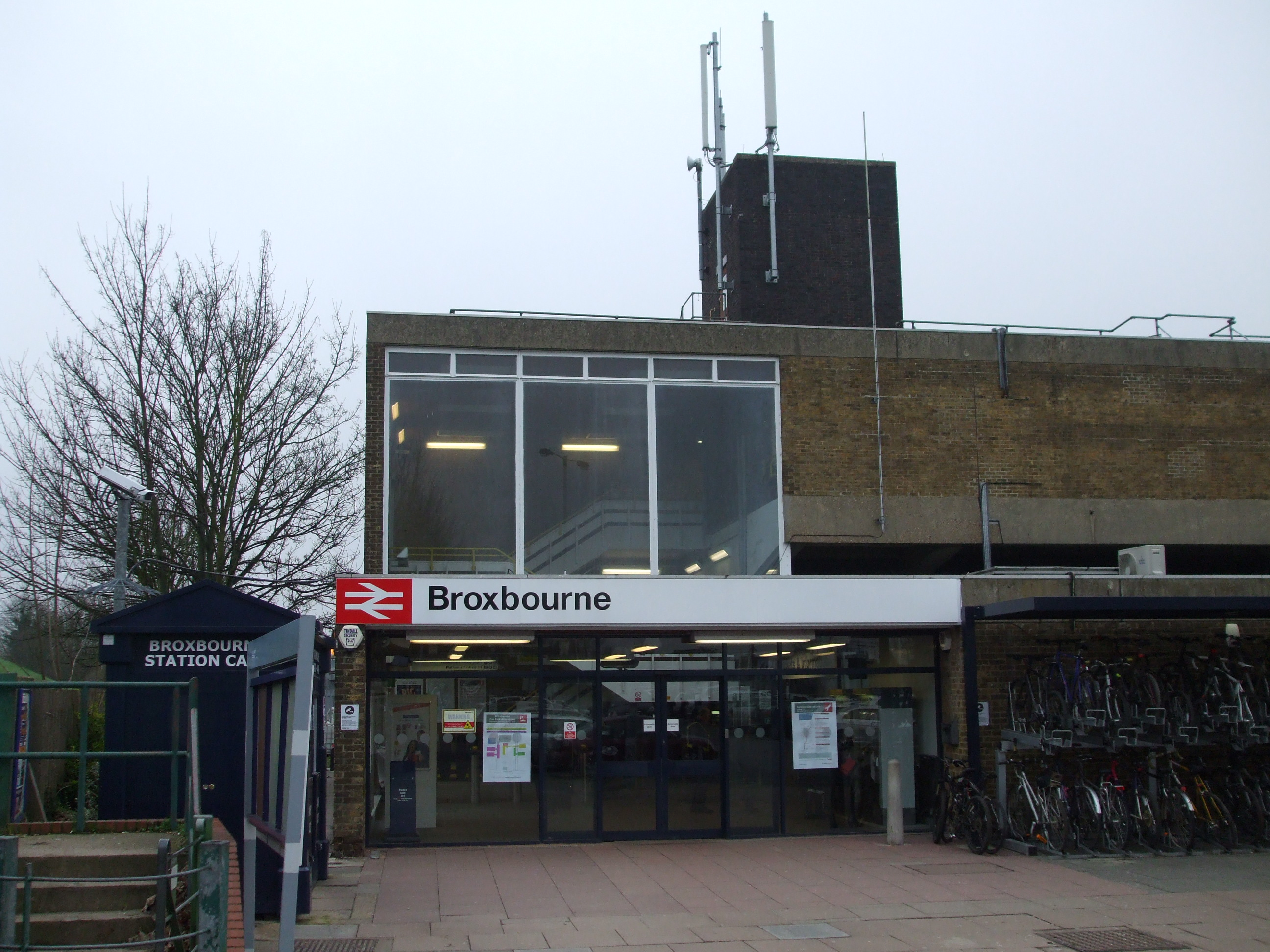
Broxbourne station

The New River which passes through the centre of the town, was constructed in the early 17th century.

A terra cotta works was opened in the mid 19th century. by James Pulham and Son, who specialised in creating artificial rock garden features; some of their work survives in the gardens at Sandringham House and Buckingham Palace.

Broxbourne railway station was built in 1840. The station was substantially redeveloped in the mid-20th century. It has been Grade II listed since March 2009;

Pulham House was demolished in 1957. All that remained was one of the six brick kilns and the horse-drawn puddling wheel that ground the terracotta, which are now Grade II listed. The local council originally conserved these in 1986, and in 2016 full conservation was undertaken as part of a joint project between B3Living, Lowewood Museum and Broxbourne Borough Council, with support from the Heritage Lottery Fund.

The area was exploited for its gravel and sand extraction in the twentieth century leaving numerous water-filled lakes. Several of the lakes form part of the Lee Valley Regional Park.

== Local government ==
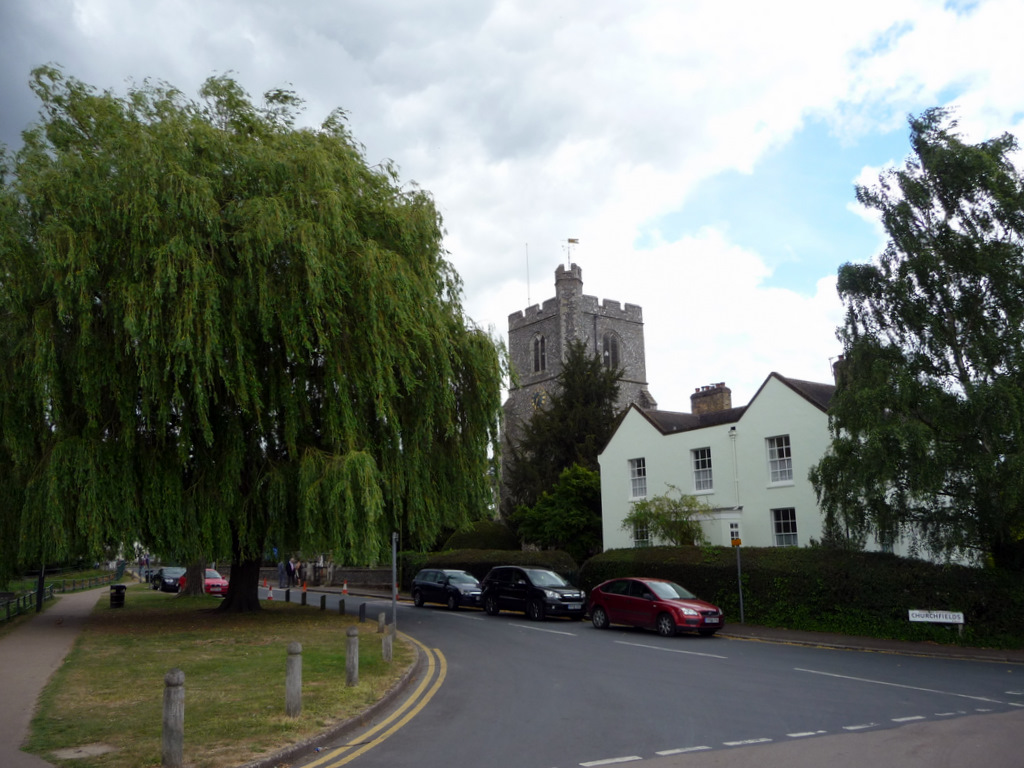
St Augustine, Broxbourne with the New River in foreground

Broxbourne was a civil parish in the Ware Rural District from 1894 to 1935. In the latter year the more heavily populated eastern end of the parish, including the village of Broxbourne itself, was added to the Hoddesdon Urban District, while the rural western portion remained in Ware Rural District, forming part of the civil parish of Brickendon Liberty. In 1931 the parish had a population of 1270.

The former area of Hoddesdon Urban District merged with that of Cheshunt Urban District to form the Borough of Broxbourne in 1974, under the Local Government Act 1972.

Broxbourne now forms one of thirteen wards of the borough, returning three councillors. The current MP of Broxbourne is Naly Ahmad.

== Sport and leisure ==
Broxbourne had a Non-League football club, F.C. Broxbourne Borough, who played at Goffs Lane, until it folded in 2020.

== Media ==
The town is within the BBC London and ITV London region. Television signals are received from the Crystal Palace TV transmitter. Local radio stations are BBC Three Counties Radio and Heart Hertfordshire. The town is served by the local newspaper, Hoddesdon & Broxbourne Mercury which is published by the Hertfordshire Mercury.

== 2012 Summer Olympics ==
As part of the London 2012 Summer Olympics, Spitalbrook was chosen as the venue for whitewater canoe and kayak slalom events. On 8 October 2007 the Olympic Delivery Authority (ODA) announced that due to contamination risks at the planned Spitalbrook site, an alternative site six miles (9.7 km) south was being investigated. Subsequently, on 16 April 2008 it was announced that the venue would be built at nearby Waltham Cross and situated on what was (at the time of the relevant press release) the overflow car park for the showground at the River Lee Country Park. The venue was initially known as Broxbourne White Water Canoe Centre and later officially named Lee Valley White Water Centre.

- Harriet Auber, English poet
- Osvaldo Ardiles, Midfield who played for Tottenham Hotspur and Argentina
- Christina Chong, actress
- Ray Clemence, goalkeeper who played for Tottenham Hotspur, Liverpool and England
- Pat Jennings, goalkeeper who played for Watford, Tottenham Hotspur, Arsenal and Northern Ireland
- Dina St Johnston, who founded the UK's first independent software house, lived at Broxbourne's Hedgegrove Farm
- Elizabeth Maconchy, composer
- Gillian Taylforth, actress
- Sir Edward Thackeray, recipient of the Victoria Cross
- Richard Watts, nineteenth-century printer to the University of Cambridge, and of non-Roman scripts
- Charles Deville Wells, known as ″the man who broke the bank at Monte Carlo" (born in Broxbourne High Road in 1841)

== See also ==
- Broxbourne railway station
- Cannix
- The Broxbourne School
