= William Watts =

William Watts may refer to:

- William Watts (East India Company official) (c. 1722–1764), British official involved in the overthrow of the last independent ruler of Bengal
- William Watts (fl. 1512–1518), mayor of Reading
- William Watts (priest), Archdeacon of Llandaff, 1706–1722
- William Watts (engraver) (1752–1851), English line-engraver
- William Watts (colonial administrator), deputy governor of Anguilla
- William Watts (Virginian) (1817–1877), American politician and businessman in Virginia
- William Walter Watts (1856–1920), botanist - moss expert
- William Carleton Watts (1880–1956), rear admiral in US Navy
- William John Watts (1846–1907), Quebec businessman, lawyer and politician
- William Arthur Watts (1930–2010), botanist and educator
- William Whitehead Watts (1860–1947), geologist
- William Watts (inventor), inventor of the shot tower
- William Watts (translator) (1590–1649), English cleric and author
- William Mavor Watts (1797/98–1874), English printer
- Bill Watts (born 1939), American wrestler and promoter

== See also ==
- Billy Watts (disambiguation)
- William Watt (disambiguation)
