= Cherry Hill, Virginia Water =

House in Virginia Water, Surrey, England

- Holthanger; Southern Court
- Location within Surrey
- 51°23′45″N 0°36′10″W
- Type: House
- Location: Virginia Water
- OS grid reference: SU 97293 67248

History
- Built: 1935

Site notes
- Area: Surrey
- Architect: Oliver Hill
- Architectural style: Modernist

Listed Building – Grade II
- Designated: 18 August 1986
- Reference no.: 1294180

Cherry Hill (formerly Holthanger and Southern Court), is a modernist-style house on the Wentworth Estate in Virginia Water, Surrey, England, designed by architect Oliver Hill and completed in 1935. Originally called Holthanger, it was renamed Southern Court and subsequently Cherry Hill.

The property was commissioned by Katherine Hannah Newton, a wealthy single woman, whose family company, Newton, Chambers & Co., was one of England's largest industrial companies. Unlike the surrounding Walter George Tarrant houses being built on the Wentworth Estate at the time, Modern Movement houses such as Holthanger were expensive "one-off" solutions designed to satisfy the needs of private individuals, and included provision for motor cars, sophisticated kitchen and heating and electrical equipment and for accommodating domestic staff.

== Original design ==
Cherry Hill was designed by Oliver Hill for Katherine Hannah Newton and was originally called Holthanger. It is built in the International Modernist style, not unlike works by Richard Neutra from around the same time. Designed between 1933 and 1937, its curved features resemble those of Joldwynds, completed in 1932 and also by Hill.

Cherry Hill, approached by a driveway from the north, is built of hollow brick, rendered white. The glazed staircase tower, which rises the height of the building, is on the north side. On the roof is a blue-green cylindrical water tank.

The front door is faced with copper, and other door and metal window frames are painted blue-green. The south wing of the house incorporates the bedrooms and reception rooms, while the north wing contains the kitchen, cloakroom, offices and the chauffeur's bungalow. The garage is connected to the west side of the house and is accessed via an uncovered passageway screened from the front garden by a wall. The two-storey house was originally surrounded by Scots pines, which Alan Powers describes as "anchoring the ship-like house in the landscape".

Three main rooms on the ground floor – the dining room, living room and sun room – are interconnected. The dining room is in the centre of the building on the south side, with windows to the south and east, and access via glazed doors to the breakfast area beneath the loggia. The soffits of the loggia are glazed with blue-green glass; A. C. Tripe suggests that this provides an "undersea effect". The loggia also provides the living room with shade against the midday sun.

The walls of the sitting room, like those of the dining room, are panelled with waxed birch. The sitting room has an open coal fire and the floor is Australian karri. At its west end, it is separated from the sun room by a glazed screen. The circular sun room faces south-west and has a window seat within the semi-circular bay window.

There are four bedrooms and three en suite bathrooms on the first floor. The two single rooms share a bathroom, but also have their own washbasins. Marion Dorn, the textiles designer, designed the original curtains for the property.

The property was featured in an American exhibition titled "Modern architecture in England" at the Museum of Modern Art, New York in 1937. Grade II listed by English Heritage in August 1986, it is the only remaining listed building on the Wentworth Estate following the demolition of Greenside in 2003.

== Alterations ==
The house was given its current name, Cherry Hill, in 1958, when it was purchased by John Hay Whitney. In 2007, Tejit Bath, a property developer, began to restore and rebuild the house, with designs inspired by the Villa Tugendhat in Czechia. A new three-level wing was built to the west of Hill's original house, incorporating two guest bedrooms, a reception room, a spa suite and a basement swimming pool. The east courtyard was reconstructed to house a study and underground cinema. Materials used for the internal furnishings include Crema Marfil marble for the floors of the ground floor and onyx for the living room wall.

== Previous owners ==
- 24 September 1930, Katherine Hannah Newton, Director of Newton, Chambers & Co. She died in May 1945 and left a gross estate valued at £200,000.
- 3 December 1945, Donald Robert Ivar Campbell, and Sheila Kathleen Campbell (wife). The purchase price was £12,000. He was a Charterhouse-educated stockbroker, who then became a film director, producer and writer. In 1960, he purchased Tiverton Castle in Devon.
- 3 September 1954, George Richard Mount, son of Sir William Mount, 1st Baronet of Wasing Place and Lady Hilda Lucy Adelaide Low. He was Chairman and Managing Director of Lennards Ltd, a footwear company that had 250 stores and a factory in Bristol.
- 1958, John Hay Whitney, United States Ambassador to the UK, publisher, art collector, philanthropist and investor. Whitney renamed the property after the exclusive Cherry Hills Country Club in Denver, Colorado, where he and President Dwight D. Eisenhower enjoyed playing golf, close to Eisenhower's Summer White House.
