= Gribble (disambiguation) =

A gribble is a marine isopod from the family Limnoriidae.

Gribble may also be a family name of British origins.

== Notable persons ==
- Bernard Gribble (1927–2004), British film editor
- B. F. Gribble (1872–1962), British marine artist
- David Gribble, Australian cinematographer
- Di Gribble (1942–2011), Australian publisher
- Eleanor Gribble (1883–1960), English artist
- Ernest Gribble (1868–1957), Australian missionary
- J. B. Gribble (1847–1893), Australian missionary, father of Ernest
- Julian Royds Gribble (1897–1918), English Victoria Cross recipient
- Mark Gribble (born 1969), English cricketer
- Matt Gribble (1962–2004), American Olympic swimmer
- Mike Gribble (1951–1994), American co-founder of Spike and Mike's Festival of Animation
- Timothy Gribble (1963–2000), American murderer and suspected serial killer
- Vivien Gribble (1888–1932), British wood engraver

== Fictional characters ==
- Dale Gribble, fictional character from the animated series King of the Hill
- Gabrielle Gribble, minor character in the novel The Worst Witch

== See also ==
- Greeble
- Scraps, a food known as gribbles in the south west of England
