= William Watt =

William Watt may refer to:

- William Watt (athlete) (1886–1957), Irish Olympic athlete
- William Watt (Australian politician) (1871–1946), Premier of Victoria and Speaker of the House of Representatives
- William Watt (journalist), journalist working for the Blackpool Gazette
- William Watt (miner) (1828–1878), California Gold Rush mining executive and California politician
- William Watt (missionary) (1843–1926), Scottish missionary to the New Hebrides
- William Watt (rugby union), Welsh international rugby union player
- William Hogg Watt (1818–1893), member of parliament in the Manawatu region of New Zealand
- W. Montgomery Watt (1909–2006), Scottish historian and professor of Arabic and Islamic Studies
- William Redfern Watt (1813–1894), New South Wales politician
- Willie Watt (footballer, born 1861), Scottish footballer
- Willie Watt (footballer, born 1946), Scottish footballer
- Willie Watt (golfer) (1889–1954), Scottish golfer
- Willie Watt (Batman Beyond), a character from the animated series Batman Beyond
- Blackie Watt, American racing driver

== See also ==
- William Watts (disambiguation)
