= William Watts (translator) =

Church of England clergyman and author

William Watts (c.1590–1649) was an English cleric and author. He was Rector of St Alban, Wood Street, London, served as chaplain to Prince Rupert of the Rhine, and published a translation of Augustine's Confessions in 1631, which serves as the principal text of the Loeb Classical Library two volume edition of the work.

== Life ==
The son of William Watts of Tibbenham, Norfolk, he was born there about 1590. He was at school at Moulton St Mary, and in 1606 at age 16 was admitted sizar at Gonville and Caius College, Cambridge. He graduated B.A. in 1611, M.A. in 1614, and was college chaplain from 1616 to 1626. He was incorporated at Oxford on 14 July 1618, and in 1639 was created D.D.

Watts travelled on the continent of Europe after leaving college, and became linguist. In December 1620 he accompanied Sir Albertus Morton as chaplain on his mission to the German Protestant princes.

In 1624, Watts was apparently appointed vicar of Barwick, Norfolk, and the next year rector of St. Alban, Wood Street, London. The former living he seemingly held until 1648: on 24 April of that year he was included in a list of sequestrated delinquents (Royalists whose estates were confiscated by Parliament). From the London rectory he was driven in 1642, and his wife and children were homeless for a time. He was serving in 1639 as army chaplain to Thomas Howard, 21st Earl of Arundel, the general of the English forces in the Bishops' War, with supervision of the other chaplains. He was appointed a prebendary of Wells Cathedral on 19 March 1633, and in 1645 was nominated Archdeacon of Wells, but never took up the post.

On Prince Rupert's return to England in 1642, Watts, who had previously held the post of chaplain to Charles I, was attached to him. He accompanied the prince on campaign, and was present throughout many actions. He also attended him at sea, and during the blockade of the royalist ships under the prince in Kinsale Harbour, Watts fell sick. He died there about December 1649, and was buried in Ireland.

== Works ==
Watts was a scholar whom Gerard Vossius praised for his major work, the edition of the Historia Major of Matthew Paris. He assisted Sir Henry Spelman with his glossary, and his translation of the Confessions of St. Augustine (London, 1631) was edited by Edward Pusey in 1838 for his Library of the Fathers. He also issued a series of newsletters under the title of The Swedish Intelligencer.

Of other works mentioned by Anthony Wood, the Bodleian Library hold a manuscript treatise on the surplice entitled The Church's Linen Garment, dated 1646, among its Tanner manuscripts (No. 262). Eliot Warburton conjectured that Watts was author of two manuscripts describing portions of Prince Rupert's maritime exploits during the Commonwealth period; he found those among the Rupert manuscripts and printed them in the third volume of his Life of the prince.

== Family ==
Watts was married and had a son. His wife, a daughter of Vaughan, minister of Ashtead, Surrey, the brother of Richard Vaughan, bishop of London, and his wife Judith, survived him.
