= Eleanor Gribble =

British artist

- Born: Eleanor Mary Woolmer; 9 September 1883; Homerton, London
- Died: 22 November 1960 (aged 77); Ipswich, England
- Education: Ipswich School of Art; Royal College of Art
- Known for: Painting, design

Eleanor Mary Gribble née Woolmer (9 September 1883 – 22 November 1960) was a British artist known as a painter, designer and book illustrator.

== Biography ==
Gribble was born in the Homerton district of London into a large family who moved to Ipswich when she was a teenager. After working as a draper's assistant alongside her father, Gribble entered the Ipswich School of Art before studying at the Royal College of Art in London and spending time drawing at the British Museum. As a student in London she won prizes in several different fields, including book illustration, before returning to Ipswich. There she ran her own private art school from her studio and also taught furniture decoration and interior design at the Ipswich School of Art. From 1913 until 1922 Gribble was the head designer and crafts women for the Frederick Tibbenham furniture company in Ipswich. She also illustrated a number of books for different publishers, including for William Collins. As an artist she exhibited paintings at the Royal Academy in London, in France and Belgium and with the Society of Women Artists. She was active in the Ipswich Art Club and also exhibited with the Royal Cambrian Academy of Art. In 1918 she married Ernest Robert Gribble and is buried at Little Blakenham in Suffolk.
