= Reginald Munn =

English army officer and cricketer (1869–1947)

Cricket information
- Batting: Right-handed

Career statistics
Competition	First-class
Matches	1
Runs scored	2
Batting average	2.00
100s/50s	0/0
Top score	2
Catches/stumpings	0/–
- Source: Cricinfo, 7 November 2022

Lieutenant-Colonel Reginald George Munn, CMG (20 August 1869 – 12 April 1947) was a British Indian Army officer and English first-class cricketer who played a single first-class game for Worcestershire against Marylebone Cricket Club (MCC) in 1900; he was bowled by Dick Pougher for 2 in his only innings.

Munn was born in Madresfield, Worcestershire. He was commissioned a second lieutenant in the Derbyshire Regiment on 23 March 1889, and promoted to lieutenant on 1 November 1890. The following year, he was admitted to the Indian Staff Corps in September 1891, and attached to the 36th Sikhs. He served with the Chitral Relief Force in 1895, and on the North West Frontier of India in 1897–98. He was promoted to captain on 23 March 1900, and from November 1901 served as Aide-de-camp to Colonel Charles Egerton, Commander of the Punjab Frontier Force. He was mentioned in a despatch from Egerton dated 4 July 1902, following operations against the Mahsud Waziris.

Munn served through the First World War, and was appointed a Companion of the Order of St Michael and St George (CMG) in the 1919 New Year Honours.

Munn died aged 77 in Virginia Water, Surrey.
