= Frinton Park Estate =

Housing estate in Frinton-on-Sea, England

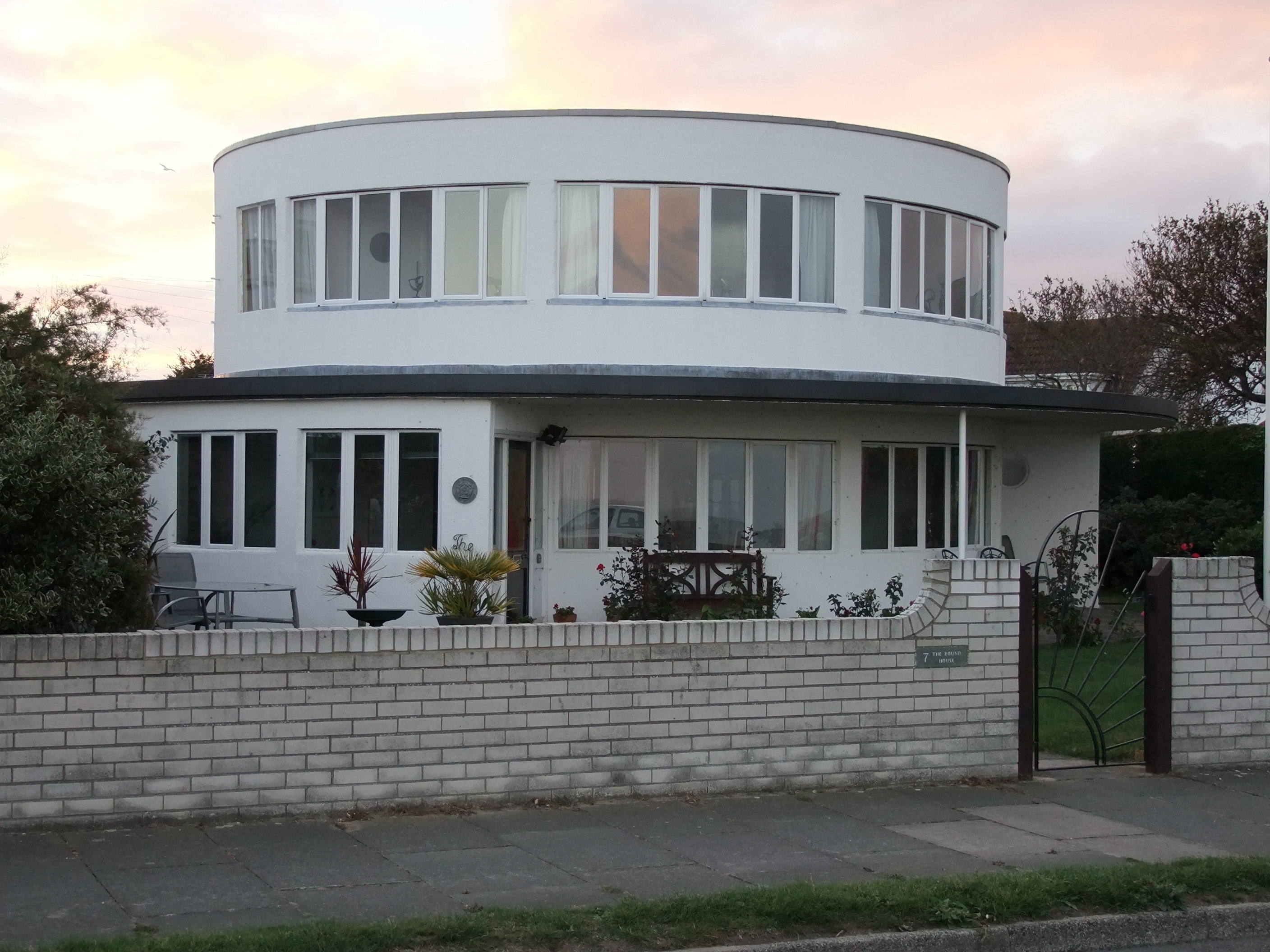
- The Round House
- Location: Frinton-on-Sea, Essex
- Coordinates: 51°50′18″N 1°15′28″E
- Built: 1930s
- Architect: Oliver Hill and others
- Architectural style(s): Modernist

Frinton Park Estate was a project at Frinton-on-Sea in Essex, England, supervised by the architect Oliver Hill, to create a housing estate which would include many examples of modernist architecture. In the event, not all the intended houses were built; many of these remain, some of which are now listed buildings.

== History ==
In 1934, the South Coast Investment Company Ltd bought 200 acres (81 ha) of land to the north-east of Frinton, to create the Frinton Park Estate. It would include 1100 houses, a town hall, college, churches, a shopping complex, and a hotel. The architect Oliver Hill was chosen to oversee the overall layout. There would be differing housing styles, including Tudor and Elizabethan. In particular, an area of 40 acres (16 ha) between the railway line and the sea was planned as a showcase for modern housing. Hill designed some of the houses and the proposed hotel, which would have been similar to his Midland Hotel, Morecambe.

Hill nominated progressive architects, including Thomas S. Tait, Wells Coates, Maxwell Fry, Frederick Etchells, Marshall Sisson, Serge Chermayeff, Frederick Gibberd and Erich Mendelsohn, to design houses, but most withdrew, and Hill resigned in August 1935; it turned out that the public were wary of experimental housing. About forty modernist houses, and part of a shopping centre, were built. After the Second World War, the rest of the estate was developed in a conventional way. The partly built shopping centre on Central Avenue became derelict, and was demolished in 2015.

== Listed houses ==
Hill designed twelve buildings on the estate, of which ten survive, and four have been given listed status, Grade II, by Historic England:

The Round House is situated on the seafront at 7 Cliff Way, at grid reference TM 24533 20551, a listed building since 1986. It is a circular building with two floors and a flat roof. It was the first to be built; it was originally the Information Bureau, with an exhibition of modern architecture by the Royal Institute of British Architects. From July 1935 it was taken over by local estate agents Tomkins, Homer and Ley, and tt was converted into a home about 1947. The listing text remarks that "the building remains a strong architectural statement with the striking use of the circular plan, projecting 'skirt' and the position of the building as a focal point of the model estate".

"Seaspan", 4 Audley Way, at grid reference TM 24542 20637 was given listed status in 1997. It is a white-painted building of two storeys with a sweeping curve to the front, tubular steel balconies, and a flat roof.

16 Warley Way, at grid reference TM 24637 20729, was given listed status in 2024. It is of white-painted rendered brick; there is a sweeping curve dominating the front aspect, and a flat roof.

55 Quendon Way, originally called "Dawn", at grid reference TM 24438 20720, is a smaller version of 4 Audley Way. It was given listed status in 1997: the listing text notes the original flush doors, light fittings and fireplace, and remarks that it is the best preserved example of the houses designed by Oliver Hill at Frinton.
