= Frederick Tibbenham =

Frederick Tibbenham (1884 – 26 June 1947) was a British cabinet maker and businessman from Ipswich, Suffolk. His company held a Royal Warrant for the production of furniture, and he also formed a construction company, working with some notable architects to design and build homes. During the two World Wars his factory made wooden aircraft propellers.

== Work ==
Tibbenham started his working life as a picture framer. He progressed to cabinet making, and in 1904, established the firm of Frederick Tibbenham Ltd, furniture makers in Ipswich. In its workshops in Turret Lane, the company made high-quality reproduction pieces, particularly in "Jacobethan" (Tudor or Elizabethan) style, which were frequently exported to the US. They were also involved in furniture restoration, and used both genuine and reproduction panelling in house restoration work.

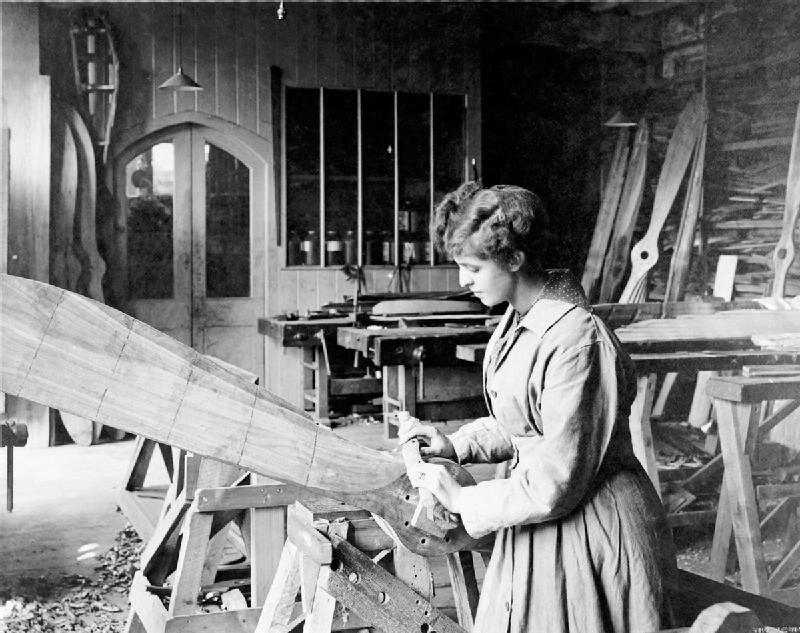
A woman making a wooden propeller in Tibbenham's factory in 1918

During World Wars I and II, Tibbenham switched the output of the factory to wooden propellers, of which there are a considerable number in private and public collections, and an equal number of photographs of the factory's manufacturing process. The firm also manufactured wooden Bren gun grips, butts and carrying handles as part of the war effort. In 1916 Tibbenham was a director of the new London-based Tibbenham's Aviation Company Ltd, formed to promote the science or sport of flying and aerial locomotion, to manufacture and deal in aeroplanes, &c. He also tried - unsuccessfully - to persuade the British army to commission the production of wooden bullets.

Between the World Wars, Tibbenham branched into construction in partnership with a number of notable architects, and as the Tibbenham Construction Company, (architect Stanley Hamp) exhibited a cottage at the 1926 Daily Mail Ideal Home Exhibition. Tibbenham had earlier trialed the building methods with Oakhurst and Tudor House in Northwood, Middlesex, a pair of Arts & Crafts oak-framed houses on the Copsewood estate, which are two of the total of only four Tibbenham buildings known to have been built by the Tibbenham Construction Company, and which are now Locally Listed. In 2010 Oakhurst came under threat of demolition by a developer, with campaigners attempting to save it, but in September 2012 permission was granted to demolish the house; demolition is scheduled for September 2013. Another building, the clubhouse for Ipswich Golf Club, opened in 1927, was built on a not-for-profit basis by Tibbenham for £3200. In 1934 Tibbenham was on the board of Frinton Park Estate Limited, the management company for an ambitious Art Deco development planned between Frinton-on-Sea and Walton-on-the-Naze which was intended to be a showcase for British design. It was Tibbenham who introduced the architect Oliver Hill to his colleagues on the board. The estate Hill envisaged was only partially finished and the company collapsed, but it is still one of the country's largest collections of Art Deco houses.

After the Second World War, Tibbenham was obliged to alter the production of the factory to 'Utility' pieces, which failed to keep the factory working. Attempts to keep the business viable included the purchase of the McLagan Furniture Company of Stratford, Ontario in 1948, but the company closed this venture within three years of acquiring it. Tibbenham's itself closed in the mid-1950s, having suffered the effects of the new purchase tax, after being a subject of a debate in the House of Commons.
