= Virginia Water =

Village in Surrey, England

Coordinates: 51.402°N 0.589°W

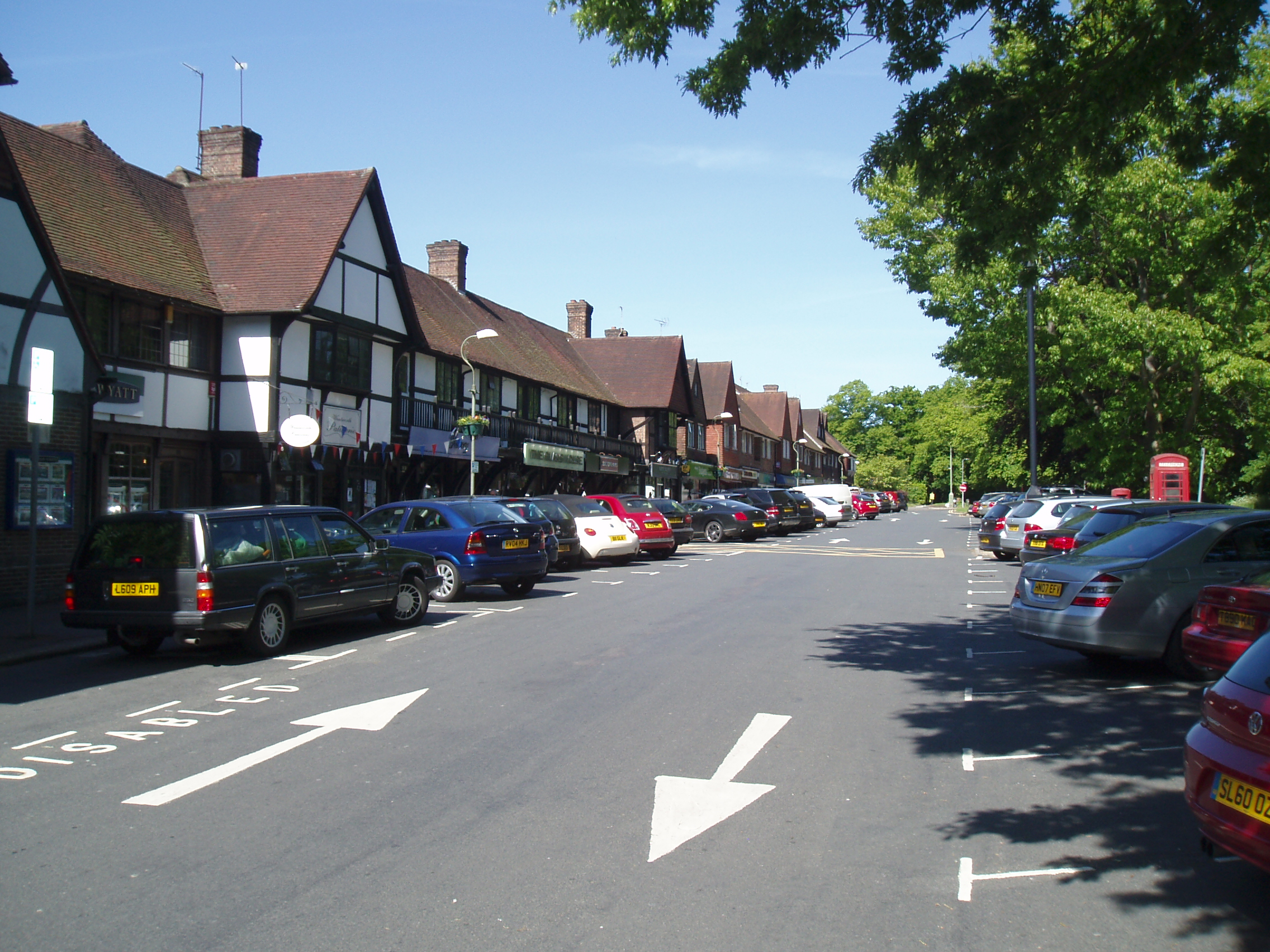
- Station Approach

- Location within Surrey
- Area: 5.71 sq mi (14.8 km^{2}) (2011, Ward)
- Population: 5,940 (2011, ward)
  - Density: 1,040/sq mi (400/km^{2})
- Protected areas: Metropolitan Green Belt, Thames Basin Heaths
- OS grid reference: SU982679
- District: Runnymede
- Shire county: Surrey
- Region: South East
- Country: England
- Sovereign state: United Kingdom
- Post town: VIRGINIA WATER
- Postcode district: GU25
- Dialling code: 01344
- Police: Surrey
- Fire: Surrey
- Ambulance: South East Coast
- UK Parliament: Windsor

Virginia Water is a commuter village in the Borough of Runnymede in Surrey, England. It is home to the Wentworth Estate and the Wentworth Club. The area has much woodland and occupies a large minority of the Runnymede district. Its name is shared with the lake on its western boundary within Windsor Great Park. Virginia Water has multiple transport links with London–Trumps Green and Thorpe Green touch the M3, Thorpe touches the M25, and Heathrow Airport is 7 miles (11 km) northeast.

Many of the detached houses are on the Wentworth Estate, the home of the Wentworth Club which has four golf courses. The Ryder Cup was first played there. It is also home to the headquarters of the PGA European Tour, the professional golf tour.

In 2011 approximately half of the homes of the postcode district, which is narrower than the current electoral ward, were detached houses. In 2015 Land Registry sales data recorded Virginia Water's single postcode district as the most expensive as to the value of homes nationwide.

== Etymology ==
The village is named after the nearby artificial Virginia Water Lake, which forms part of Windsor Great Park.

== History ==
=== Early history ===
The area is believed to have been traversed by the Devil's Highway, a Roman road running from London to Silchester in Hampshire. According to a 1983 article by Nicholas Fuentes, the defeat of Boudica’s revolt by the Romans in AD 60/61 may have occurred in Virginia Water. He argued that the topography between Callow Hill and Knowle Hill corresponds with descriptions by Tacitus, with the battlefield situated near the site of the present-day railway station.

=== Modern history ===
Christ Church Virginia Water was completed in 1838 and established as a parish the same year.

In 1805, a mansion was constructed for Edward Pakenham, the brother-in-law of the Duke of Wellington, which now forms the club house of the Wentworth Club. Ramón Cabrera, 1st Duke of Maestrazgo, an exiled Carlist general, purchased the house in 1850.

To the east of the lake is the Clockcase tower, a Grade I listed, triangular belvedere built in the Great Park during the 1750s. It is three-storey Gothic style construction. George III made it into an observatory and Queen Victoria occasionally had tea there. The building is inaccessible to the public, lying within a private part of the park, and remains under the ownership of the Royal Estate.

=== Virginia Park ===
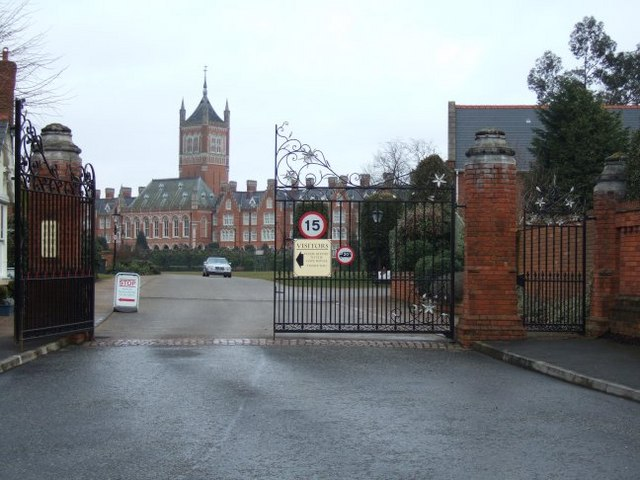
Entrance to Virginia Park

Virginia Park is a gated housing development occupying the site of the former Holloway Sanatorium, a mental asylum constructed in 1885 to the design of William Henry Crossland. This was a private institution where patients paid for their own treatment. In 1948, it was taken over by the newly established National Health Service, and closed in the early 1980s, experiencing frequent vandalism in the aftermath.

In 2000, the building and grounds were converted into private-sector housing by a developer, Octagon. Octagon produced 23 residences in the main building and built 190 new houses and apartments on the grounds. Properties are expensive and typically reach beyond the £1 million mark.

The main building is Grade I listed, the highest category of recognition and protection. The sanatorium chapel is Grade II* listed, meaning in a constrained mid-tier of the statutory scheme. The gated estate includes a spa, gymnasium, multi-purpose sports hall, and all-weather tennis court.

=== Wentworth Estate ===
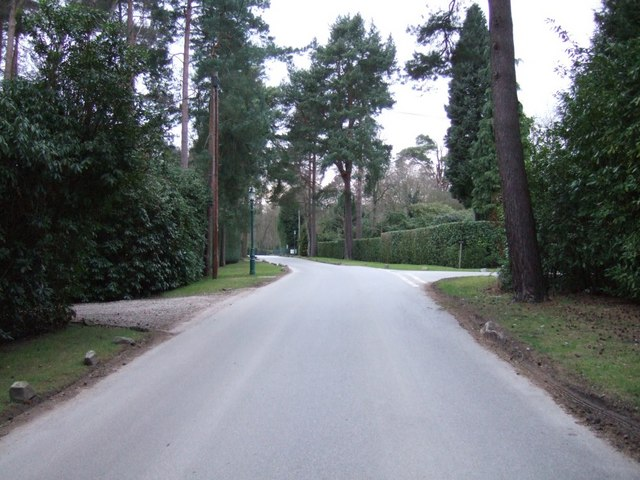
A manicured street on the estate

1,750 square kilometres (680 sq mi) of Virginia Water is owned by a members' trustee body, known as the Wentworth Estate. Founded in the 1920s, this estate comprises private sector houses, luxury apartments, woodland, several golf courses and a leisure club. It also includes part of the River Bourne, Chertsey.

The estate, due to its high walls and electric gates, has been compared to a "fortified suburb" found more commonly in South Africa and a place "where money disappears from view". Famous residents have included Elton John, Bruce Forsyth, Diana Dors and various professional golfers. Properties on the estate are regarded as "super prime" and have sold for as much as £50 million.

In 1998, the estate received significant media attention when former Chilean dictator Augusto Pinochet was placed under house arrest in one of its properties, following his arrest in London and contested extradition.

== Geography ==
=== Physical geography ===
The River Bourne runs from the artificial Virginia Water Lake through the long southern half of Virginia Water.

=== Housing and socio-economic geography ===
The 2011 census stated that the Virginia Water postcode district (post town) had the following dwellings, thus making up the relative proportions shown:

Type	Number	Proportion
Whole house or bungalow: Detached	1,175	49.9%
Whole house or bungalow: Semi-detached	478	20.3%
Whole house or bungalow: Terraced (including end-terrace)	247	10.5%
Flat, maisonette or apartment: Purpose-built block of flats or tenement	346	14.7%
Flat, maisonette or apartment: Part of a converted or shared house (including bed-sits)	52	2.2%
Flat, maisonette or apartment: In a commercial building	33	1.4%
Caravan or other mobile or temporary structure	26	1.1%

Government data in terms of sales of homes from Autumn 2014 to 2015 showed Virginia Water to be the most expensive post town nationally (i.e. excluding any part of London). The recent averaged sold price for its homes was just over £1.1m.

== Transport ==
=== Roads ===
The M3 motorway is adjacent to Virginia Water.

=== Railways ===
Virginia Water railway station runs frequent South Western Railway trains to London Waterloo, Weybridge, Twickenham, Richmond, Staines, Feltham, Clapham Junction, Vauxhall and Reading.

== Education ==
Christ Church Infant School was built by the National Society in 1843. In 2020, due to loss of intake, Surrey County Council earmarked the school for closure, with attendees planned to move to consolidated Englefield Green Infant School by 2023.

St Ann's Heath Junior School is on Sandhills Lane. Trumps Green Infant School is on Crown Road.

== Notable people ==
- Susie Amy – actress
- Petr Aven – Russian oligarch, banker and art collector
- Qairat Boranbaev – Kazakhstani oligarch, senior football administrator in the Kazakhstan Premier League
- Bill Bryson – writer, resident in the early 1980s
- Ramón Cabrera, 1st Duke of Maestrazgo – exiled Carlist Spanish general and owner of the Wentworth Estate; buried with widow in a Grade II listed tomb by the Anglican church
- Gilbert Cannan – novelist and dramatist, long-term resident of Holloway Sanatorium, where he died of cancer on 30 June 1955
- Joseph Coyne – American-born vaudevillian and musical comedy actor
- Ron Dennis – executive and investor, founder of the McLaren Group
- Joan Adeney Easdale – poet, resided at Holloway Sanatorium between 1954 and 1961
- Percy Fletcher – classical composer and musical director at London theatres
- Bryan Forbes – film director, screenwriter, film producer, actor and novelist, until his death in 2013. Ran a loss-making bookshop on Virginia Water parade as he thought "it was 'right' to have a bookshop in his local village"
- Bruce Forsyth – television presenter, some years until his death in 2017
- Kirsty Gallacher – television presenter
- Wilfrid Wilson Gibson – Georgian poet, associated with World War I died in the village on 26 May 1962
- Marina Granovskaia – Russian–Canadian business executive, director of Chelsea F.C.
- Naseem Hamed – boxer
- Robert Haslam, Baron Haslam – life peer, industrialist and chairman of the British Steel Corporation and British Coal
- Joan M. Hussey - British Byzantine scholar and historian
- Elton John – composer and music performer owned Hercules, a three-bedroom house, from 1972 to 1976.
- Eddie Jordan – racing driver, TV presenter and owner of the Jordan Grand Prix F1 racing team
- Gulnara Karimova – Uzbek kleptocrat and daughter of Islam Karimov, former-president of Uzbekistan
- German Khan – Ukrainian oligarch
- Arvid Lindblad – Formula 1 driver for Racing Bulls
- Wilnelia Merced – Miss World 1975 and widow of Bruce Forsyth
- Reginald Munn – British Indian Army officer and English cricketer
- Bill Nankeville – Olympic athlete and father of Bobby Davro
- Vaslav Nijinsky – ballet dancer and choreographer, from 1947 for three years (until his death)
- Paul O'Grady – moved to Virginia Water at age 17, to work at the Wheatsheaf Hotel
- Alexander Perepilichny – Russian businessman and whistleblower
- Prajadhipok – King Rama VII of Siam, died in the village in 1941
- Cliff Richard – singer
- Andriy Shevchenko – Ukrainian footballer
- Bernie Taupin – lyricist
- John Hay Whitney – U.S. Ambassador to the United Kingdom. Lived at Cherry Hill on the Wentworth Estate
- Joe Wicks – celebrity fitness coach lived in village as a child
