= Belmont School, Surrey =

School in Surrey, England

Coordinates: 51.1891°N 0.4060°W

- Holmbury St Mary, Surrey; United Kingdom

Information
- School type: Private School
- Established: 1880
- Closed: 2023
- Gender: Mixed
- Age: 3 to 16

Belmont was an independent co-educational school in Surrey which took pupils from the ages of 3 to 16. The school was a charitable trust, administered by an independent Board of Governors.

== Location ==
Belmont is located in 65 acres of woodland on a hill to the east of Holmbury St Mary. The school is a mile north-west of Leith Hill in the Surrey Hills AONB.

== History ==
Belmont School was founded in 1880 in Blackheath, London. It subsequently moved to the village of Westcott, Surrey and, in the mid-1950s, under the tenure of headmaster Frank Sharples, it moved to its current location at Holmbury St Mary.

The current site is a former country house, called Feldemore. It was built for Edwin Waterhouse, co-founder of the accountancy practice of Price Waterhouse and was designed by the architects, George Tunstal Redmayne and Alfred Waterhouse. Before being sold to the owners of the school, the house had been requisitioned by the British Army during the Second World War and, following the end of hostilities, it was leased for ten years by the Admiralty. The Grade II-listed building is constructed partly of Bargate stone and the interior includes wallpaper by William Morris.

Much of the house was destroyed by a fire in February 1991. Following an extensive renovation, the building was officially reopened by Kenneth Baker, Baron Baker of Dorking, the former local MP and Secretary of State for Education, in November of the following year.

In December 2023 the headteacher announced that the school would close down at the end of term on Friday 15 December.

The school has now closed down.

== Notable alumni ==
- Alice Capsey (born 2004), English cricketer
