= Holmbury St Mary =

Village and parish in Surrey, England

Coordinates: 51°11′10″N 0°24′36″W

- Village
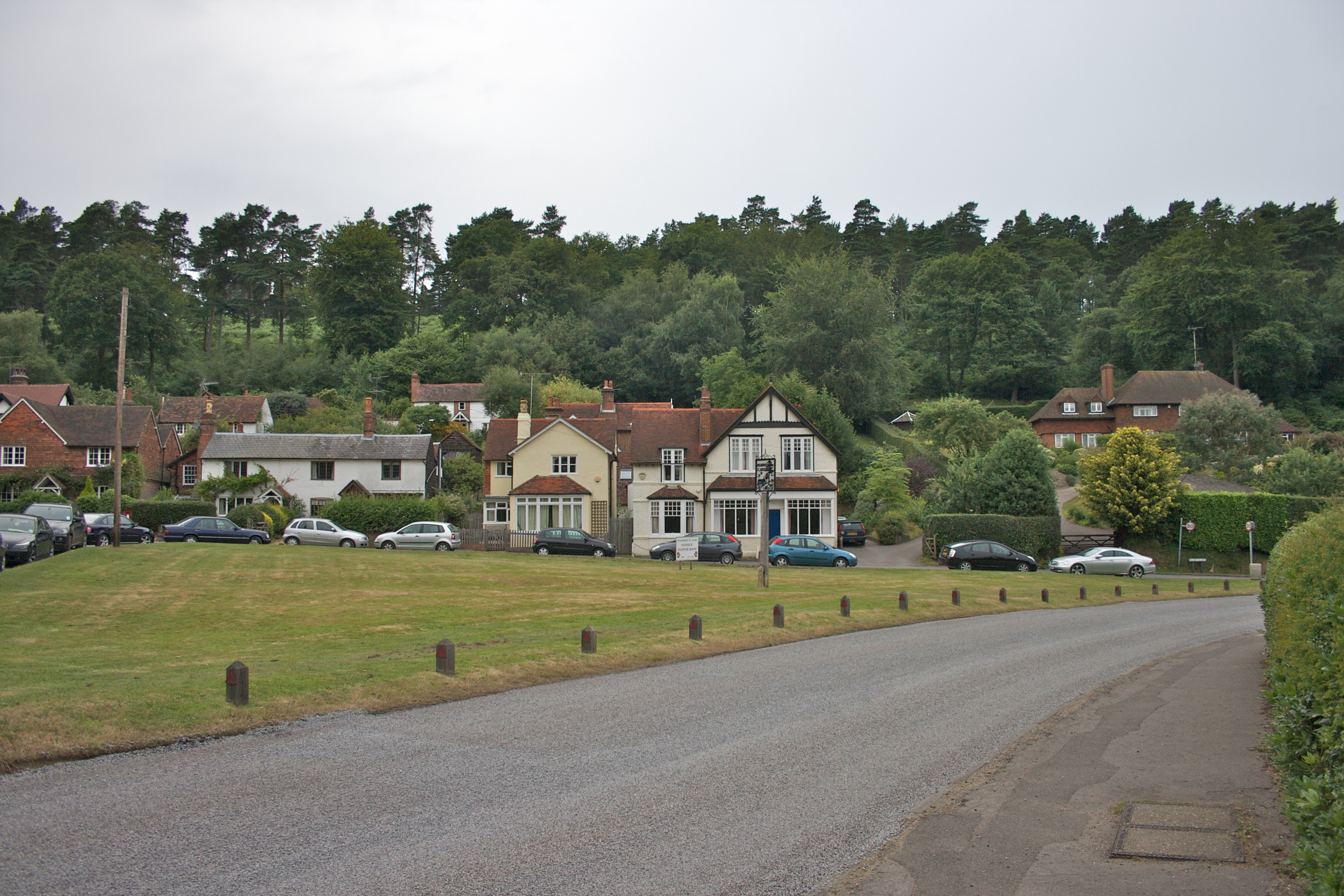
- The village green, central houses and low escarpment backdrop

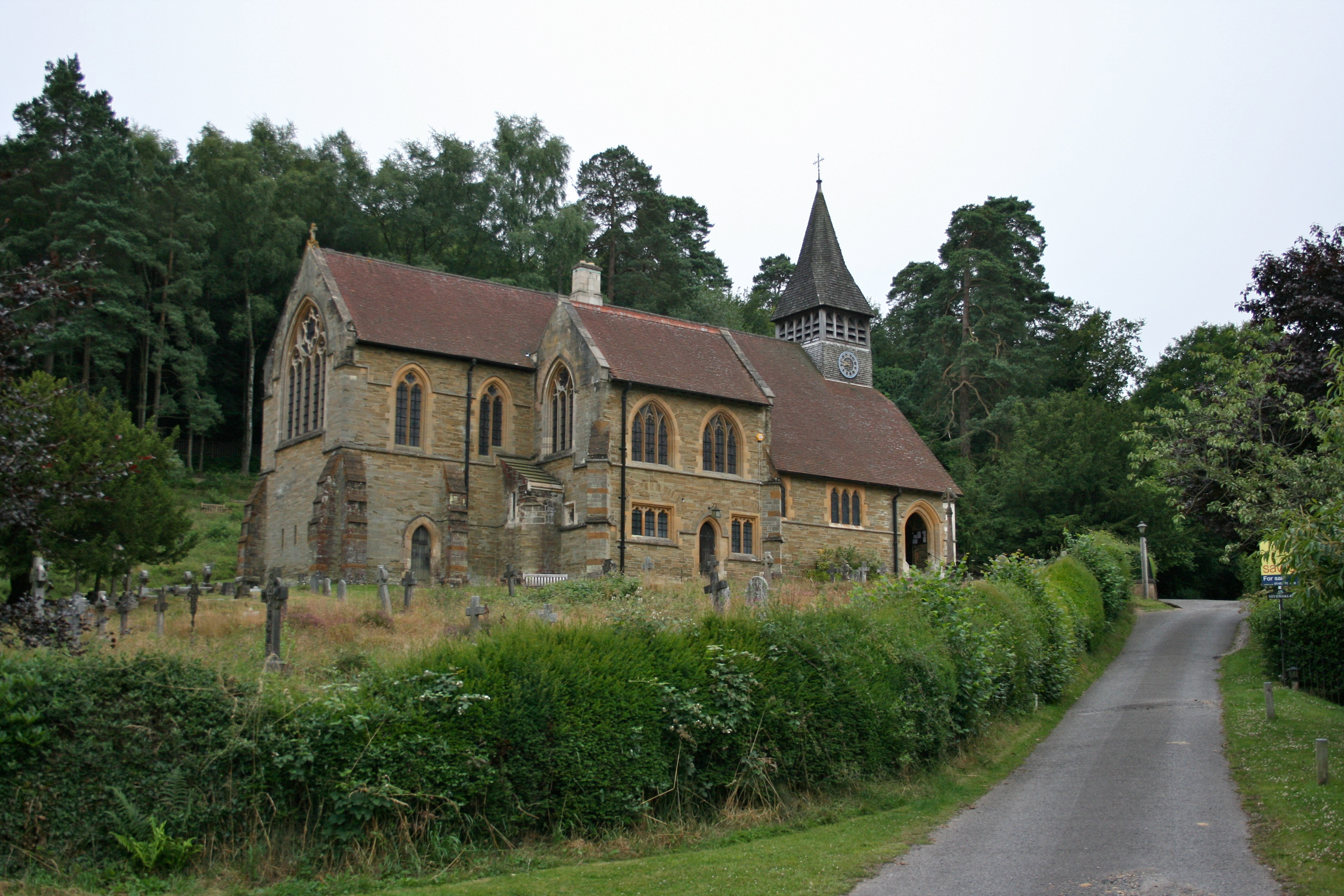
- St Mary's Church

- Location within Surrey
- Area: 2 km^{2} (0.77 sq mi)
- Population: 572 (2011 Census)
  - Density: 286/km^{2} (740/sq mi)
- OS grid reference: TQ112441
- Civil parish: Shere Abinger
- District: Guildford Mole Valley
- Shire county: Surrey
- Region: South East
- Country: England
- Sovereign state: United Kingdom
- Post town: DORKING
- Postcode district: RH5
- Dialling code: 01306
- Police: Surrey
- Fire: Surrey
- Ambulance: South East Coast
- UK Parliament: Godalming and Ash

Holmbury St Mary is a village in Surrey, England centered on shallow upper slopes of the Greensand Ridge. Its developed area is a nucleated village, 4.5 miles (7 km) southwest of Dorking and 8 miles (13 km) southeast of Guildford. Most of the village is in the borough of Guildford, within Shere civil parish. Much of the east side of the village street is in the district of Mole Valley, within Abinger civil parish.

It contains a building which formerly doubled as a meeting venue for Beatrice Webb, a Fabian social reformer who co-founded the London School of Economics; it is now the location of the Mullard Space Science Laboratory. There is a YHA youth hostel.

== Geography ==
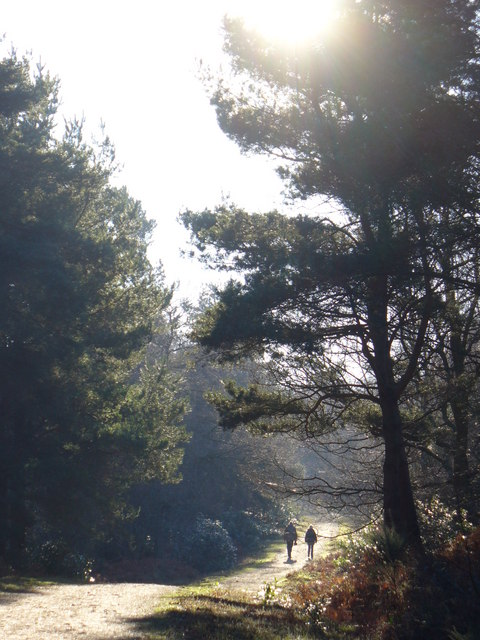
Walking trail on Holmbury Hill

Holmbury St Mary is located inside the Hurtwood Forest, which is considered the largest area of common land in Surrey; it takes up part of the Greensand Ridge which in turn contributes to the Surrey Hills National Landscape. Nearby to the south is Holmbury Hill, which at 857 feet (261 m) is the fourth highest point in Surrey. The summit of Holmbury Hill, containing a hill fort and the Bray family memorial cairn, is the only part of the hill to be located in Holmbury, at the Ockley Estate.

== History ==
Holmbury St Mary, an ecclesiastical parish in Surrey, was formed from the civil parishes of Shere, Abinger, Ewhurst, Cranley, Ockley, and Ockham, in 1878. Originally called Falady, it was renamed after the church was built in 1879; now named after the Holmbury hill and St Mary's Church at its heart overlooking the village green. The church was initiated and paid for in 1879 by George Edmund Street, who had built himself a large house in the village between 1873 and 1876, named "Holmdale". Holmdale later became home to Thomas Sivewright Catto, the Governor of the Bank of England from 1944 to 1949. When George Edmund Street first visited Felday with his wife, Mariquita in 1872, she was so captivated by the town she called it "Heaven's gate" and the couple moved there soon after. Mariquita died in 1874 never having seen the completion of their home or the church.

Anecdotal evidence suggested that Holmbury St Mary (known as Felday) was the site of small and unlisted prisoner of war camp during the First World War. This was confirmed by Keith Winser, who undertook a search through the Holmbury parish magazines where he found that construction for the camp was completed in 1917 by the Royal Defence Corps for the internment of German prisoners of war. The prisoners were believed to have been available to the town to be used for manual labour in the timber harvesting of the local forests.

Council Tax payers in Holmbury St Mary pay a precept to one of two civil parishes, depending on the location of their property in the village.

== Notable landmarks ==
=== Beatrice Webb House and Trust ===
From 1947 to 1986, a large building hosted the Webb Memorial Trust for Rethinking Poverty as a tribute to Beatrice Webb and her work. The Beatrice Webb House was opened by Clement Attlee and served as an important education and discussion facility for the Fabian Society, British Labour Party and trade unions. The Fabian Window, designed by George Bernard Shaw (who co-founded the London School of Economics (LSE) with Sidney and Beatrice Webb), depicting the founders of the Fabian Society, hung in the house until it was stolen in 1978. The window was recovered in 2005 and is now on long-term loan to the London School of Economics. Today the house is a boarding house for Hurtwood House School.

=== St Mary's Church ===
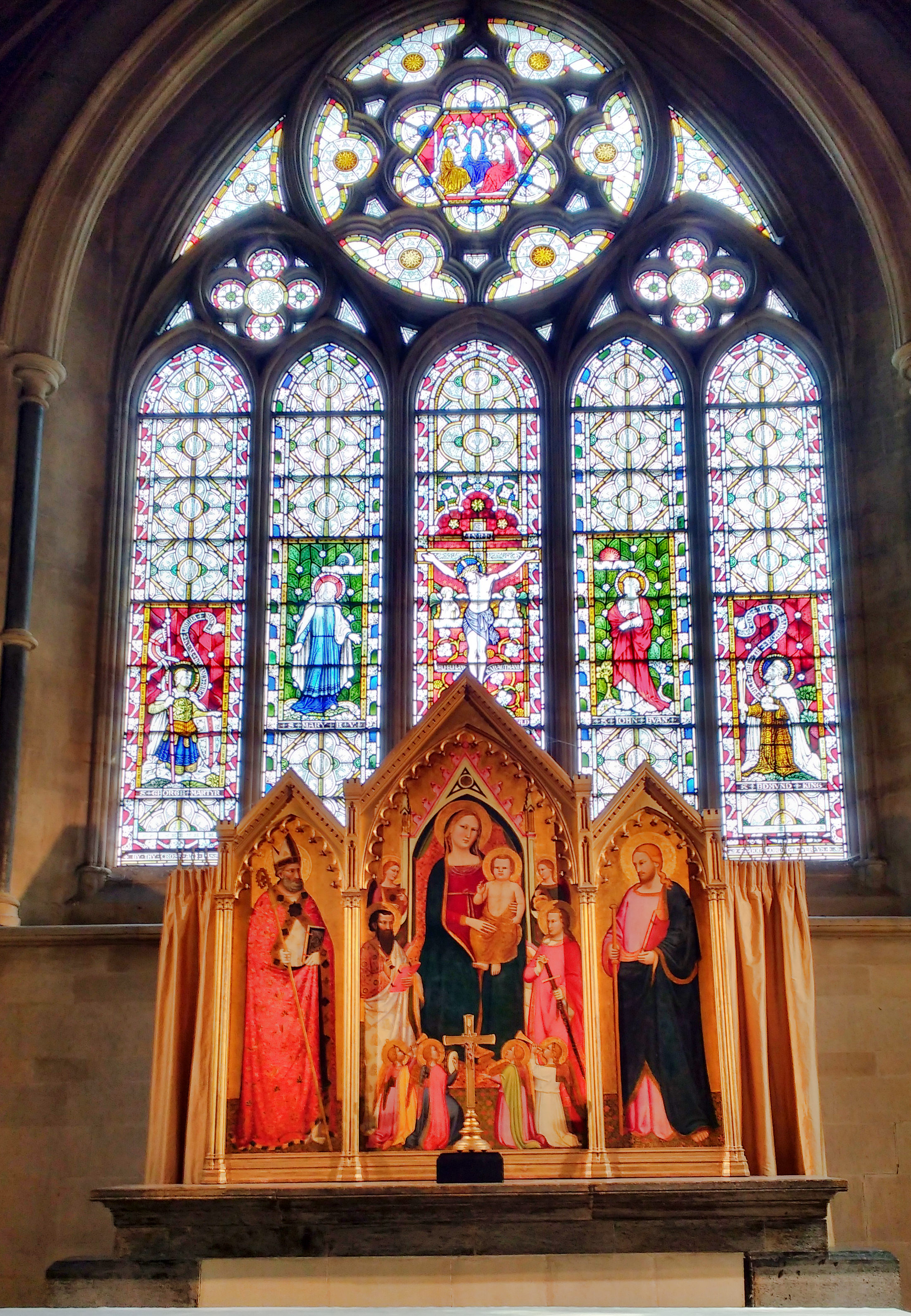
Altar and East Window, St Mary the Virgin

The Church of St Mary the Virgin is part of the Leith Hill United Benefice which includes the churches of St James, Abinger Common and Christ Church, Coldharbour. Inside it has a triptych behind the altar that is attributed to Spinello Aretino and in the North Chapel a painting attributed to Jacopo da Sellaio. The church is a Grade I listed building. The surgeon, histologist and anatomist Sir William Bowman, 1st Baronet is buried in the churchyard.

=== Mullard Space Science Laboratory ===
Holmbury St Mary is home to the University College London's Department of Space and Climate Physics Mullard Space Science Laboratory, which is the country's largest purely University-led space science research group. The laboratory was established at Holmbury St Mary in 1966 and since then has participated in more than 35 satellite missions and over 200 rocket experiments.

=== Youth hostel ===
The Youth Hostels Association (England & Wales) (YHA) operates Holmbury St Mary youth hostel. The hostel opened on 13 July 1935. Howard Leslie Vicars Lobb designed the building.

== Village ==
=== Physical attributes ===
The village layout is known as a nucleated village, that centres around a church overlooking the village green. The village itself is situated within a ravine, which had once been home to small sandstone quarry and clay brick businesses for the area. The village contains two contrasting styles of architecture represented by the Woodhouse Copse, an Arts and Crafts style cottage designed by Oliver Hill in 1926, and Joldwynds, a Modernist house also by Oliver Hill, in 1932. Though many of the houses these days have a brick exterior leaning more towards the cottage style.

=== Demography ===
By 1911 the village had a population of 651 individuals while today there are only 572 people still living there. The UK Government has produced maps to show the developed parts of two of 2011 Census Output Areas approximate to the relevant area, E00155533 and E00155534.

Respectively these have the following attributes:

Western Output Area

There were 343 usual residents as at Census day 2011. Of these, 98.3% lived in households and 1.7% lived in communal establishments. The average (mean) age of residents was 44.5 years.

Eastern Output Area

There were 229 usual residents as at Census day 2011. Of these, 100% lived in households and 0% lived in communal establishments. The average (mean) age of residents was 43.1 years.

=== Schools ===
Belmont Preparatory School is a private prep school for ages two to thirteen.

Hurtwood House is a public school for ages sixteen to eighteen.

=== Former school ===
Moon Hall School which provided special education to children with dyslexia, closed in 2021 A school of the same name and purpose is in Reigate.

=== Sports ===
Holmbury St Mary has two football teams which compete in the Guildford and Woking Alliance. The 1st XI are in the Premier Division and the newly formed 2nd XI are in the 3rd Division.

Holmbury also has two cricket teams. The first XI plays in Division Two of the Surrey Downs League and the second XI plays in the Second Division of the Village Cricket League. The Village Club, The Hollybush Tavern, also has its own cricket side which plays friendly matches.

== Annual events ==
Holmbury St Mary has an annual bonfire and fireworks night in the Glade, organised and funded by a group known as The Bonfire Boys who gather wood from the Hurtwood and put on a fireworks show on the weekend following Halloween. Thousands attend and all profits are donated to charity.

Until 2020, the village held annual spring and summer flower shows, organised by the Holmbury St Mary Horticultural Society. They offered competitions in a range of events and prizes.

Holmbury St Mary's religious community offer a range of celebrations held by the church, including choral performances and popular Christmas services.

== In popular culture ==
Holmbury St Mary is believed to be the basis for the fictional village of Summer Street in A Room With A View. Its author, E.M. Forster, was a long-standing resident in Abinger Hammer in the deep valley below to the north.
