= Wentworth Estate =

Private housing estate in Surrey, England

Coordinates: 51.397°N 0.584°W

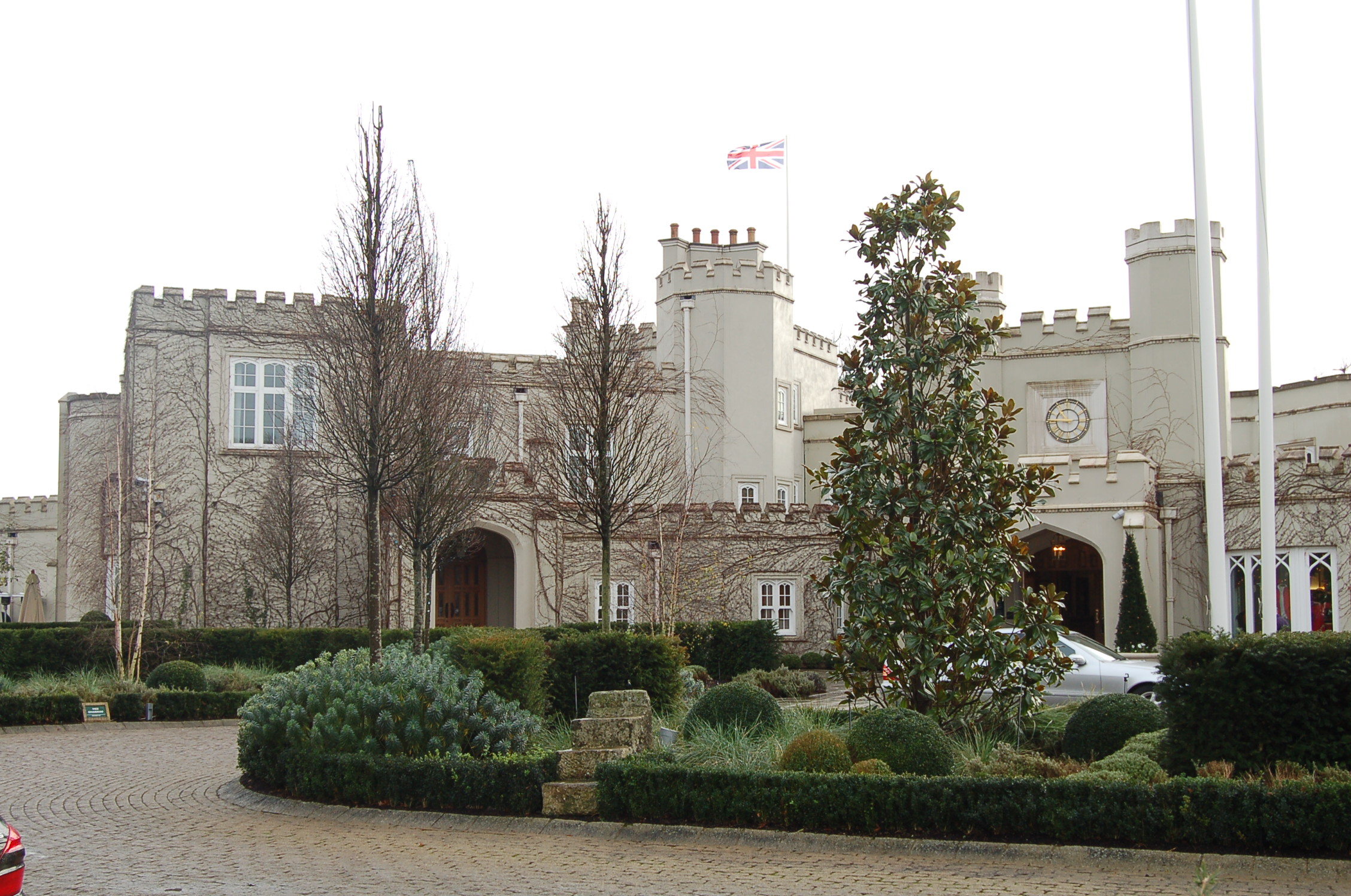
- Wentworth clubhouse, built by Ramón Cabrera, 1st Duke of Maestrazgo

- Location within Surrey
- Population: less than 2,000
- OS grid reference: SU9867
- District: Runnymede
- Shire county: Surrey
- Region: South East
- Country: England
- Sovereign state: United Kingdom
- Post town: Virginia Water
- Postcode district: GU25
- Dialling code: 01344
- Police: Surrey
- Fire: Surrey
- Ambulance: South East Coast
- UK Parliament: Runnymede and Weybridge

The Wentworth Estate is a private residential estate in Virginia Water, Borough of Runnymede, Surrey. Set in 2.7 sq mi (7 km^{2}) of woods, it lies on a gently undulating area of coniferous heathland adjacent to Windsor Great Park. The private Wentworth Club and its multiple golf courses also form part of the estate.

A passion project of master builder W. G. Tarrant, Wentworth originated in the early 1920s when Tarrant began the construction of a golf course around a manor house previously owned by Ramón Cabrera, 1st Duke of Maestrazgo. The architectural styles of homes on the estate are diverse, ranging from the ornate, multi-chimneyed Arts and Crafts designs of the earliest properties to later Neo-Georgian, Colonial Revival, and postmodern examples.

The estate is known for offering a high level of privacy and security to its residents. Numerous celebrities have lived there, including Elton John, Bruce Forsyth, Diana Dors, and various professional golfers.

== History ==
=== Early history ===
For many centuries, the land now occupied by the estate was ignored by settlers, as the 'sandy heathland' made it 'pretty much useless' for growing crops. In the 18th century it became part of a small country estate owned by Mrs. Thomas Wentworth, widow of Colonel Thomas Wentworth, who fought against Charles Edward Stuart in the Jacobite rising of 1745. The 19th-century house Wentworths (now the clubhouse of the Wentworth Club) was the home of a brother-in-law of the 1st Duke of Wellington, Culling Charles Smith. It was purchased in 1850 by the exiled Carlist Ramón Cabrera, 1st Duke of Maestrazgo, and, following his death, his wife acquired the surrounding lands, which later formed the nucleus of the Wentworth Estate.

=== Development, 1922–1939 ===
In 1912, builder W. G. Tarrant began developing St George's Hill, Weybridge, a residential estate of houses set on plots of at least 1-acre (0.40 ha) arranged around a golf course. In 1922, Tarrant acquired the development rights for the Wentworth Estate, commissioning Harry Colt to design a golf course centred on the main house. As in each of his other major developments, he envisioned an exclusive estate with covenants that ensured that it would be preserved. Unlike St George's Hill, where each property was built on at least an acre of land, Tarrant opted to allow houses of a broader range of size and price.

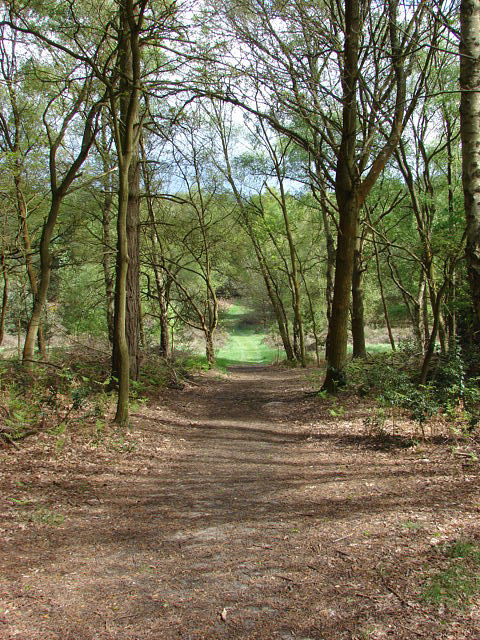
A footpath on the estate

Tarrant developed the large houses on the estate in a similar style to that used at St George's Hill, characterised by tall chimneys, dormer windows, gables, leaded lights, and tile-hung or half-timbered exteriors, often in combination. Most were constructed using hand-made bricks and tiles. Some houses featured stonework around the front door and stone fireplaces, a few had marble floors in the hall, and the most elaborate – of which Tarrant was particularly proud – bore a stone tablet with his initials, WGT. The most notable property developed during these years is arguably Cherry Hill, built in the International Modernist style by noted country house designer Oliver Hill.

Development of the Wentworth Estate slowed during the economic depression of the late 1920s and, in 1931, when the banks demanded repayment of a large debenture, Tarrant was forced to declare bankruptcy. Ownership of the land passed to Wentworth Estates Ltd, which came under the control of Sir Lindsay Parkinson & Co. Ltd. Construction resumed in the late 1930s, with many houses built by Tarrant Builders Ltd, of which Tarrant's son Percy was a director. However, work again ceased during World War II, when priority shifted to the construction of high-density housing near Virginia Water railway station.

=== Modern history ===
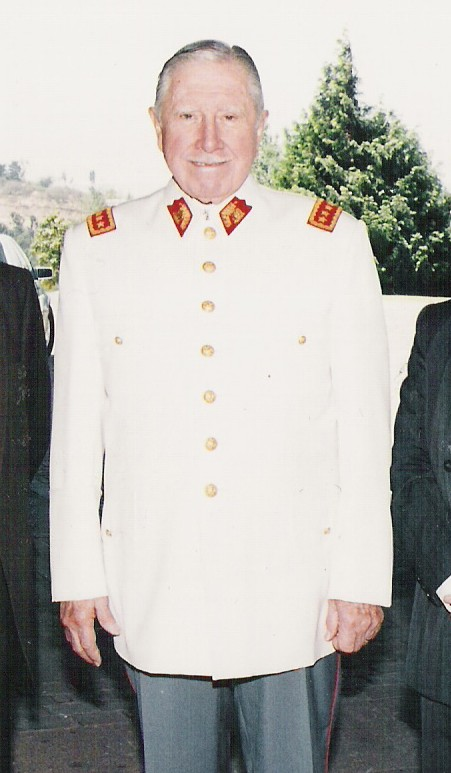
Augusto Pinochet

With the outbreak of World War II, the Wentworth Estate was selected as an alternative seat of government and rural command post, offering fewer security risks and greater resources than the London Cabinet War Rooms. A subterranean bunker and tunnel system, now sealed and covered by car parks, was constructed near the clubhouse. Designed by Harley Dalrymple-Hay, it was built in 1939 and comprised two 25 feet (7.6 m)-diameter parallel tunnels made from cast-iron London Underground tube segments, with a 12 feet (3.7 m)-diameter service tunnel running between them. The complex was occupied by the GHQ Home Forces, and later by the 1st Signal Regiment. It was vacated in December 1944.

Post-war development picked up considerably, and, by 1960, most of the available land was already used. The 1970s saw an increasing number of musicians purchasing property, including lyricist Bernie Taupin, Yes bassist Chris Squire, electronic music pioneer Gary Numan, and band leader Ted Heath. The estate made the British newspaper headlines in 1998 as the location where former Chilean dictator Augusto Pinochet, following his arrest in London, began 18 months of 'luxurious house arrest' after an extradition request from Spain.

== Planning and amenities ==
Wentworth Estate Act 1964
- Act of Parliament
- Parliament of the United Kingdom
- Long title: An Act to make provision for the maintenance of the private roads and footpaths on the estate known as the Wentworth Estate in the urban district of Egham and the rural district of Bagshot in the county of Surrey; and for other purposes.
- Citation: 1964 c. xl

Dates
- Royal assent: 31 July 1964

Status: Current legislation

Text of statute as originally enacted

In 1962, a committee of residents and the company promoted a private bill for an act of Parliament, and on 31 July 1964, the Wentworth Estate Act 1964 (c. xl) was given royal assent. The act established the Wentworth Estate Roads Committee, which appoints its members on advice from the Wentworth Residents' Association.

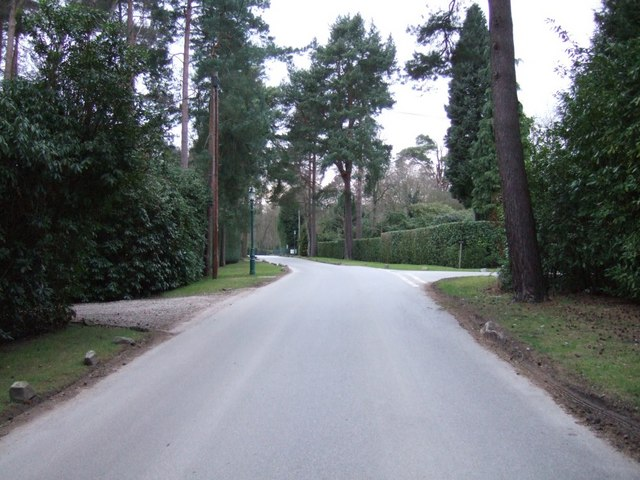
West Drive (2006)

The Wentworth Estate is laid out across 700 hectares (1750 acres) and forms one of Europe's premier residential areas. The estate borders the centre of Virginia Water, which comprises a row of shops, restaurants, and other amenities. The adjoining area includes Windsor Great Park, formerly the private hunting ground for Windsor Castle, and Chobham Common, a rare lowland heath which is a Site of Special Scientific Interest.

The estate has a single public footpath, West Drive, which leads from the A30 junction all the way along to the junction with East Drive/South Drive. The footpath then leaves the road and proceeds across the East Course and exits onto Wellington Avenue. Contrary to what 'many people' believe, all other footpaths and roads are for the use of residents only. The golf course land and 'associated open areas' are owned by the Wentworth Club, though restrictions to the public apply here as well.

The Wentworth Estate features high walls and electric gates, and for this reason has been compared to a 'fortified suburb' more commonly found in South Africa than England. Regular security patrols and guarding services are conducted by Cannons Security, a private firm contracted by the estate.

=== Wentworth Club ===
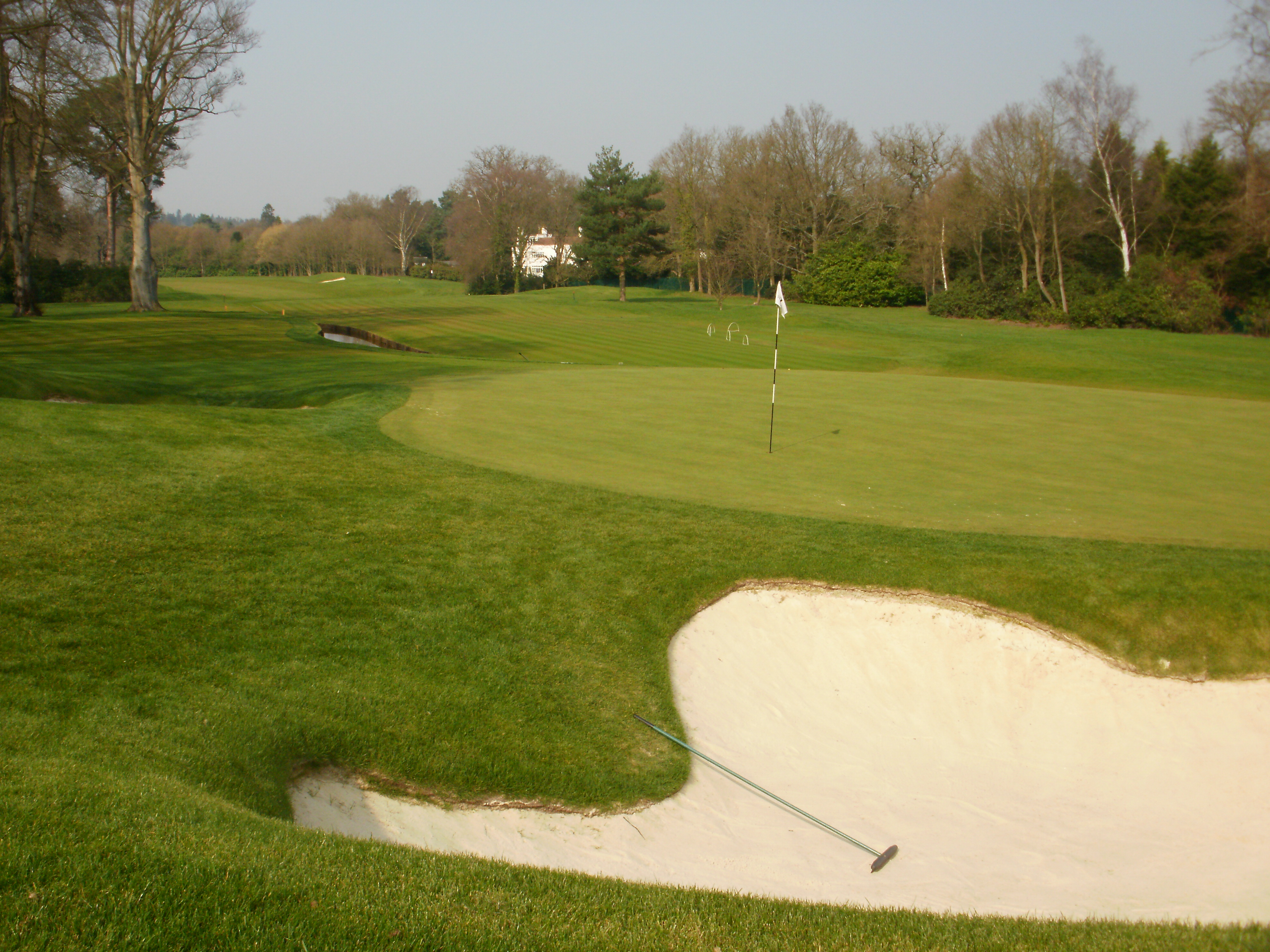
A bunker on the course (2011)

Opening in 1924, Wentworth is a prestigious golf venue. It is the permanent host of the BMW PGA Championship, and is also home to the headquarters of the PGA European Tour. There are three 18-hole courses at Wentworth: the original East Course, the West Course (also known as Burma Road) and the Edinburgh Course. These are complimented by a nine-hole layout, the Executive Course. As of 2025, membership fees are said to be around £175,000 ($237,000).

The clubhouse is reportedly the 'heart' of estate life, used by residents as a location for dining and drinking, socialising, and exercising. In 2018, an extensive renovation of the clubhouse was completed, with redesigns of the reception, pro shop, bar and restaurants, locker rooms and function rooms. Residents on the 'main island' enjoy the most convenient access to the golf course, and can arrive just 'seconds' after leaving their house.

== Transport ==
Road

Wentworth is just outside the ring of the London Orbital with a junction 3 miles (5 km) north. Routes from the west of the estate lead into Berkshire and towards Camberley and the Bagshot junction of the M3, which links to Southampton and to the A303.

Rail

Wentworth is adjoined to its south and east by a major stop and minor stop railway station on the London Waterloo to Reading Line: Virginia Water and Longcross respectively.

Air

Wentworth is 7 miles (11 km) south-west of Heathrow Airport; in private aviation Fairoaks Airport is 5 miles (8 km) south, accessible through Lyne and Ottershaw.

== Notable residents ==
The Wentworth Estate has been home to a number of notable people. Among the first residents was author Agatha Christie and her husband Archie Christie, who built their own home on the estate; they later separated while living there.

Early occupants of Cherry Hill include film director Ivar Campbell and John Hay Whitney, a prominent investor who purchased the house in 1958 while serving as United States Ambassador to the United Kingdom.

Entertainers Elton John, Bruce Forsyth, and Diana Dors lived on the estate, as did various sports personalities such as boxer Prince Naseem Hamed, cricketer Kevin Pietersen, and footballer Andriy Shevchenko. Owing to the presence of the Wentworth Club, numerous golfers are current and former residents, including Nick Faldo, Ernie Els, Sam Torrance, and Rory McIlroy.

== See also ==
- Burwood Park
- St George's Hill
