= Billy Watts =

Billy Watts may refer to:

- Billy Watts (musician), guitarist with Red Young and Eric Burdon
- Billy Watts (rugby), see 2008 Leeds Rhinos season
- Billy Watts (actor), see Happy Days Are Here Again (film)

== See also ==
- William Watts (disambiguation)
- Bill Watts (born 1939), American retired professional wrestler- and promoter, and former football player
