= R. Watts =

English printer

Richard Watts (died 24 March 1844) was an early nineteenth-century English printer, located in Crown Court, Temple Bar, London. His work is identified under the signature R. Watts.

Watts was the printer for the University of Cambridge from 1802 until 1809, (a switch to stenotype was made by the school in 1804). He left Cambridge in 1809 and set up a printing workshop in Broxbourne, subsequently setting up the Oriental Type-Foundry on Temple Bar, London, in 1816.

Watts developed a reputation as "a cutter and founder of Oriental and foreign characters, of which he accumulated a considerable collection". His Oriental Type-Foundry was also the oriental printer for the Church Missionary Society, the Bible Society, the Prayer Book Society, and the Homily Society.

Watts's son, William Mavor Watts (1797/98-1874), took over the printing business in Crown Court, Temple Bar.

Watts died age 70 and is buried in All Saints' Church, Edmonton.

== Apprentices to Richard Watts ==
- Richard Clay I (1789-1877), was apprenticed to Richard Watts in 1803. His son, Charles John Clay, was printer to the University of Cambridge between 1854–1882.
- Mirza Salih was apprenticed to Watts in 1819.
- Sullivan (Sulman) Law Hyder, was apprenticed to Watts for five years in the 1820s before going to work as a printer in Calcutta in 1931.
- William Colenso was apprenticed to Watts in 1833.
