= Woodhouse Copse, Holmbury St Mary =

Woodhouse Copse
- Location within Surrey
- 51°11′45″N 0°24′51″W
- Location: Holmbury St Mary
- OS grid reference: TQ1079445320

History
- Built: 1926

Site notes
- Area: Surrey
- Architect: Oliver Hill
- Architectural style: Arts and Crafts
- Owner: Monika Saunders

Listed Building – Grade II
- Official name: Woodhouse Copse
- Designated: 4 August 1997
- Reference no.: 1245123

Woodhouse Copse is an Arts and Crafts style house in the village of Holmbury St Mary, Surrey, England. It is a Grade II listed building, with gardens originally planted by garden designer Gertrude Jekyll. Country house opera is performed by Woodhouse Opera at the annual Woodhouse Summer Opera Festival.

== House ==
Built in 1926, the house was designed by architect Oliver Hill for the stage and film actor Amy Brandon Thomas and her husband William Deane Barnes-Brand. In 1939 Hill built another house for the couple, Burrows Wood in Gomshall, Surrey, which is also Grade II listed.

Woodhouse Copse is a large cottage orné, originally with a thatched roof, built in brick with weatherboarding and a large, central stone chimney. Hill was influenced by Edwin Lutyens and Gertrude Jekyll in his use of local materials and vernacular architecture. However, his almost sculptural shaping of the thatch was distinctive. He built similar houses elsewhere in the 1920s, including at Croyde, Devon and Knowle in the Midlands. Woodhouse Copse also featured timbers retrieved from an old mill at Coulsdon, as commemorated in a verse engraved in 1925 on a window. The central shaft from the mill was incorporated into a spiral staircase. The house's thatch was later removed.

== Garden ==
Hill laid out the garden with its terraces, drystone walls and circular steps. Over 1926–28, Jekyll drew up planting plans for the flowerbeds, and supplied the plants from her nursery at Munstead Wood, Surrey, where Amy Brandon Thomas was a frequent visitor.

== Music ==
Musical performances are organised by Music at Woodhouse, which is led by Monika Saunders, the house's owner. She converted an indoor swimming pool into a concert room and created a lakeside amphitheatre for opera. Besides the annual opera festival, concerts are held throughout the year. There is a focus on using young performers, including some drawn from the Royal College of Music and the Royal Academy of Music.

== See also ==
- List of opera festivals
- Joldwynds, Holmbury St Mary (Oliver Hill, 1932)
