= Landfall (house) =

Modernist house in Poole, England

- Interactive map of Landfall
- 50°42′21″N 1°56′24″W
- Location: 19 Crichel Mount Road, Poole, Dorset, England
- OS grid reference: SZ 04267 89454

History
- Built: 1936–1938

Site notes
- Architect: Oliver Hill
- Architectural style: Modern Movement

Listed Building – Grade II*
- Reference no.: Listed Building England 1267436

Landfall is a house in Poole, Dorset, England, that was built between 1936 and 1938 by the architect Oliver Hill in the modernist style. It has been designated as a Grade II* listed building by Historic England.

The house was designed and built for Edna and Dudley Shaw Ashton. A film was made of the construction of the building which won a national amateur film award. Dudley Shaw Ashton became a film director. The circular room in the centre of the house doubled up as a film cinema and was inspired by the 1934 British musical film, Evergreen. It had a circular rug by Marion Dorn in off white with a central motif. The fitted furniture was designed by Betty Joel. Flying circular stairs, constructed of reinforced concrete, led from the balcony to the garden terrace. Beneath the terrace is an air raid shelter. Ship's stairs led from the first floor up to the sun room on the roof.

The Ashtons were socialites, with Landfall being visited by many famous people from the arts, cinema and authors . They were asked to sign the back of the door of the cloakroom. Signatures include Henry Moore, Ben Nicholson, David Hockney, Ceri Richards, John Hutton, Frances Richards, Terry Frost, Roland Penrose, Thorold Dickinson, Anthony Asquith, John Grierson, Jacquetta Hawkes, Hugh Ross Williamson and William Kean Seymour.

Landfall is referenced by the architectural historian Alan Powers in Modern: The Modern Movement in Britain. It was featured in his 1989 exhibition Oliver Hill : Architect and Lover of Life 1887–1968, and in an associated publication. Landfall has been referenced in numerous books, journals and newspaper articles.
