= William Mavor Watts =

English printer

William Mavor Watts (1797/98–1874) was an English printer, based in London, who specialised in non-Roman fonts and Bible printing.

== The printing business ==
Watts took over the printing business that his father Richard Watts had established in Crown Court, Temple Bar, London, and developed it further:

Mr Watts made his name well known as a printer who could undertake to set up copy in almost every language, and turn out his work in thoroughly artistic style. The founts of type he possessed, available for the printing of works in almost every known language, would have done honour to the wealthiest and most learned of academies.

After Watts's death in 1874, his widow established a new printing-office in Gray's Inn Road, which subsequently went up in flames. After this the business was sold to the Rivington family of printers.

The valuable matrices of the numerous founts of type, embracing nearly every known written language in the world, and produced by Mr Watts with much assiduity and at great expense, were fortunately preserved. Some of the founts were cut under the personal superintendence of celebrated Oriental, classical, and missionary scholars, and are much used by the British and Foreign Bible Society in distributing the Holy Scriptures all over the world. There are considerably over two hundred of these languages, not to speak of the different dialects... Swatow, Pwo-karen, Lepcha, Kinika, Nupe, Bullom, Batta, Lifu, Tchuwash, Tukudh, Wuch, Ossetian...
