= William Watt (rugby union) =

- Full name: William James Watt
- Born: 16 May 1890 Llanelly, Wales
- Died: 16 September 1950 (aged 60) Roehampton, Surrey, England

Rugby union career
- Position: Centre
International career
Years	Team	Apps	(Points)
1914	Wales	1	(3)

William James Watt (16 May 1890 — 16 September 1950) was a Welsh international rugby union player.

Watt was born in Llanelly and captained the rugby side at his college (which became Trinity University College). His solitary Wales cap came in a 1914 Five Nations match against England at Twickenham, as a centre.

In World War I, Watt served as a second lieutenant with the South Wales Borderers, suffering serious wounds.

Watt played his club rugby for Llanelly RFC as well as London Welsh over the border, where he had a chartered accountancy practice. He later served London Welsh as club president.

== See also ==
- List of Wales national rugby union players
