= Midland Hotel, Morecambe =

Listed building in Lancashire, England

Midland Hotel
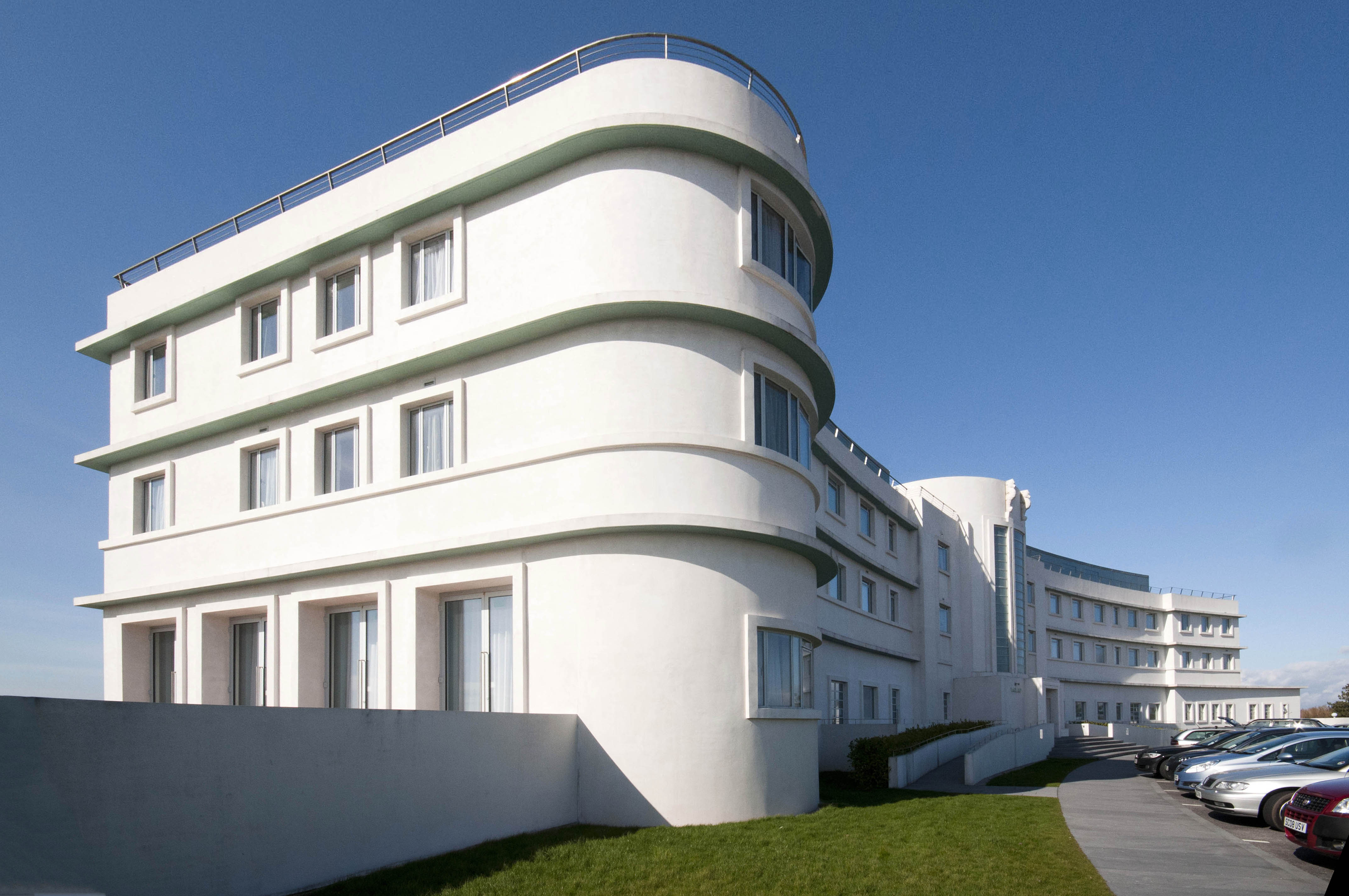

- Location within Morecambe

General information
- Type: Hotel
- Architectural style: Streamline Moderne
- Location: Morecambe, Lancashire, England
- Coordinates: 54.0721°N 2.8754°W
- Opened: July 1933

Technical details
- Material: Concrete and rendered brickwork
- Floor count: 3

Design and construction
- Architect: Oliver Hill

Renovating team
- Architect: Union North

Website
- midlandhotelmorecambe.com

Listed Building – Grade II*
- Official name: Midland Hotel
- Designated: 8 October 1976
- Reference no.: 1208988

The Midland Hotel is a Streamline Moderne building in Morecambe, Lancashire, England. It was built by the London, Midland and Scottish Railway (LMS), in 1933, to the designs of architect Oliver Hill, with sculpture by Eric Gill, and murals by Eric Ravilious (subsequently destroyed). It is a Grade II* listed building. The hotel has been restored by Urban Splash with architects Union North, Northwest Regional Development Agency and Lancaster City Council.

== Construction ==
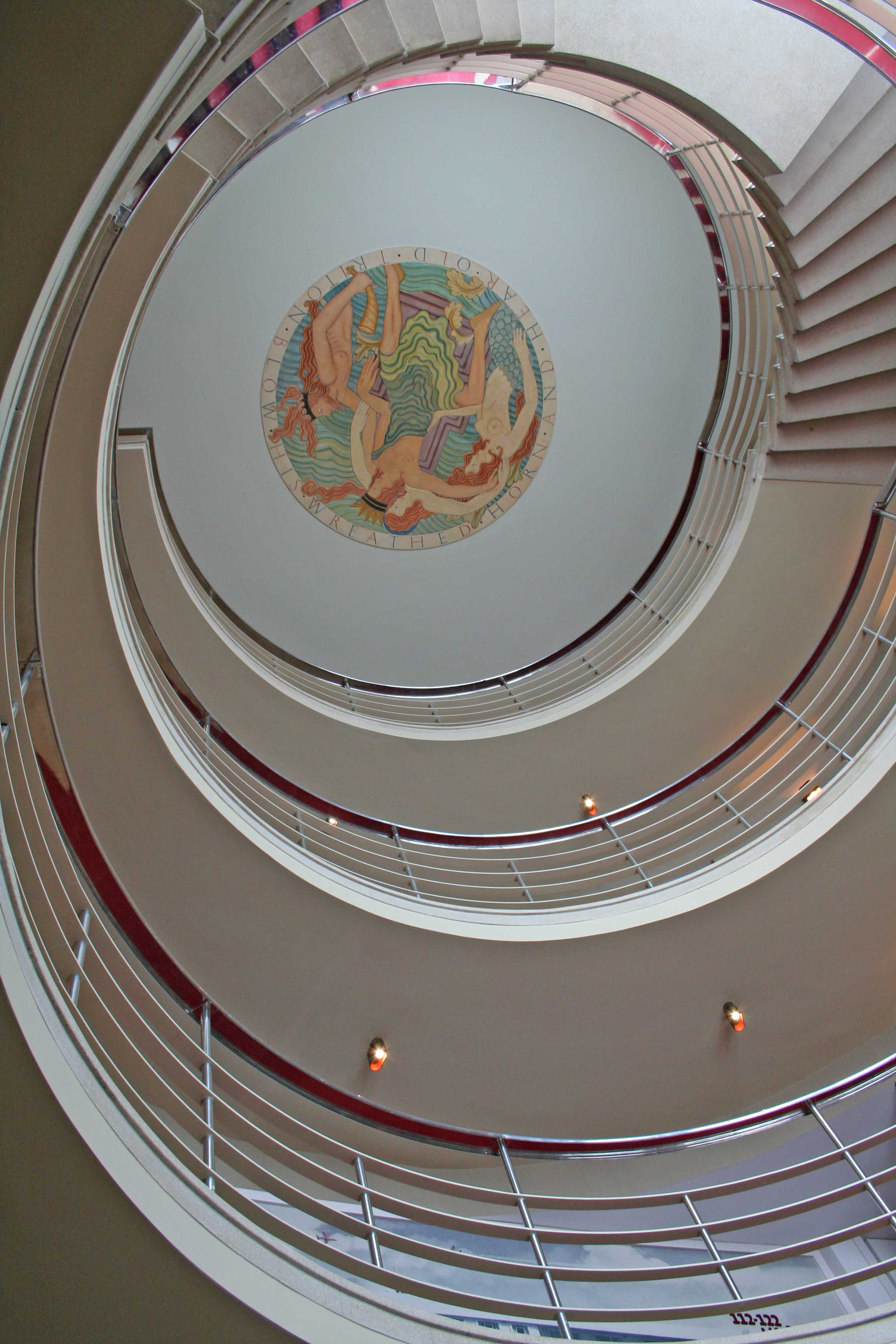
Midland Hotel staircase with Eric Gill's Neptune and Triton Medallion

The Midland Hotel was built to replace two earlier hotels: the North Western Hotel built in 1848 by the "little" North Western Railway, which had been renamed the Midland Hotel in 1871 when the Midland Railway took over the North Western Railway; and another hotel at Heysham, the Heysham Towers, which was converted from a private house in 1896. The Heysham Towers served railway steamer traffic from Heysham Harbour to Belfast; but it was not a success and was sold in 1919.

In 1932 the London, Midland and Scottish Railway (LMS) bought land from Morecambe Corporation to build the 40-bedroom Midland Hotel replacing the old hotel. It opened in July 1933.

== The design ==
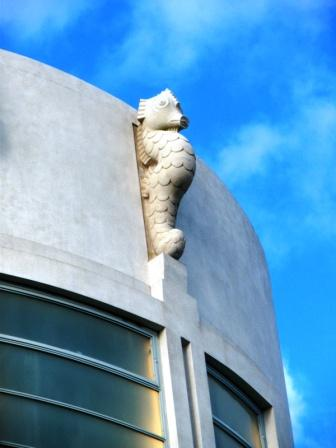
One of Eric Gill's two seahorses above the entrance to the hotel

The hotel is designed in the Streamline Moderne style of Art Deco. Oliver Hill designed a three-storey curving building, with a central circular tower containing the entrance and a spiral staircase, and a circular café at the north end. The front of the hotel is decorated with two Art Deco seahorses, which can be viewed at close proximity from the hotel's rooftop terrace.

The hotel stands on the seafront with the convex side facing the sea, and the concave side facing inland. Hill designed the hotel to complement the curve of the promenade, which allowed guests to view spectacular panoramas of the North West coast.

The former Morecambe Promenade railway station, served by the railway company whose showcase hotel this was, is nearby.

== War time use and disposal ==
During the Second World War the Midland Hotel, along with most of the large hotels and garages in the town, was requisitioned, either for the newly created RAF Station, RAF Morecambe or for the Civil Service.

The hotel became the station's hospital, opening on 17 February 1940. The Senior Medical Officer was Wing Commander R.C.L. Fisher. The hotel was stripped of its valuable carpets and rugs and the Gill mural was covered. By June 1941 the station magazine, Morecambe Wings was reporting that the hospital had already treated 3,700 patients, including 160 major operations and 400 minor ones.

Also reported was the average attendance at the massage clinic of 33 people daily, but this was declining due to the end of the football season. Up to June 1941, over 1,000 airmen had been fitted with spectacles and over 100,000 had been inoculated or vaccinated. The hospital was visited in February 1941 by Princess Mary, Princess Royal, accompanied by Air Vice-Marshal William Tyrrell. At the time the station commander was Group Captain E. Hillman-Gray.

On nationalisation of the railways, ownership transferred to the British Transport Commission (BTC) on 1 January 1948 coming under the control of the BTC's Railway Executive; however on 1 July 1948, along with the other railway hotels, ownership was transferred to the BTC's Hotels Executive. It was sold by the BTC in 1952.

== 21st century ==
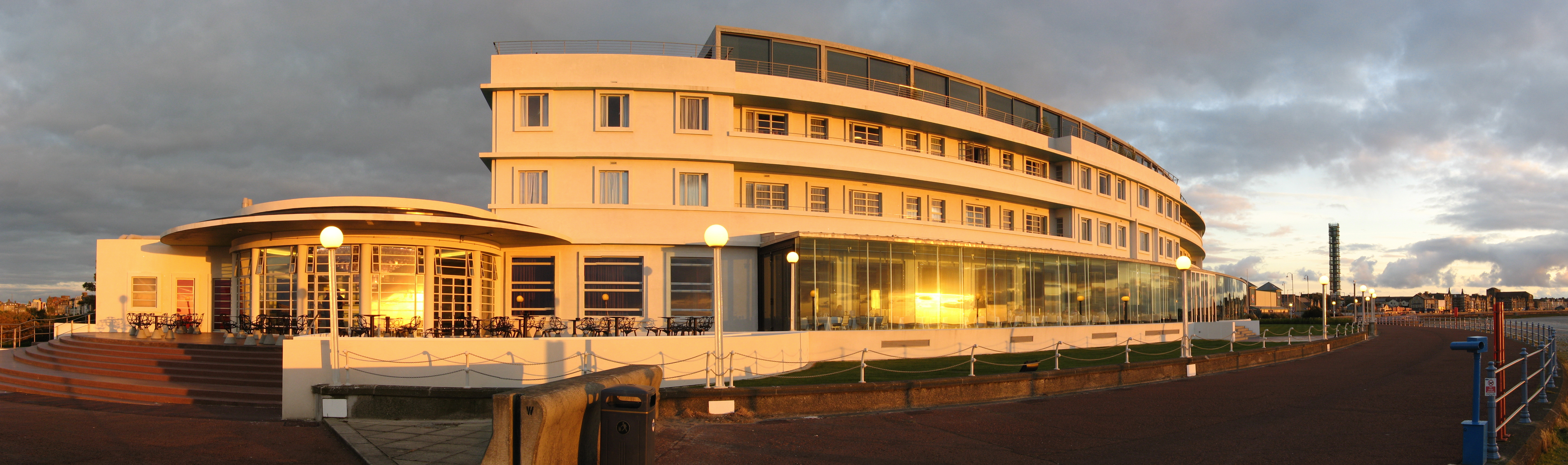
Midland Hotel in 2008 after restoration

Union North were employed as architects by Urban Splash for the refurbishment and expansion of the hotel commencing in 2006. It opened its doors to the public in the summer of 2008.

In April 2009, Urban Splash announced a partnership with English Lakes Hotels to manage the Midland Hotel from 8 April 2009. Further developments on the Central Promenade were completed by Urban Splash. The mural by Ravilious had only lasted two years, until 1935, as a result of the poorly-finished plaster on which it was painted. It was temporarily reinstated for the filming of the Poirot episode in 1989, and a modified version was painted by the artist Jonquil Cook in 2013.

== Other history ==
The 1960 film The Entertainer was filmed in Morecambe, and features the hotel. The hotel was used in filming episodes of the TV series Agatha Christie's Poirot, starring David Suchet, in 1989, most notably in the episode "Double Sin" where Poirot has brought Captain Hastings to stimulate "the little grey cells." David Constantine's short story "Tea at the Midland" is set at the hotel, and begins with a debate about the work of Eric Gill.

== See also ==
- Grade II* listed buildings in Lancashire
- Listed buildings in Morecambe
- Eric Gill at the Midland Hotel, Morecambe
- British Transport Hotels
- Joldwynds (Oliver Hill, 1932)
