= Oliver Hill (architect) =

British architect

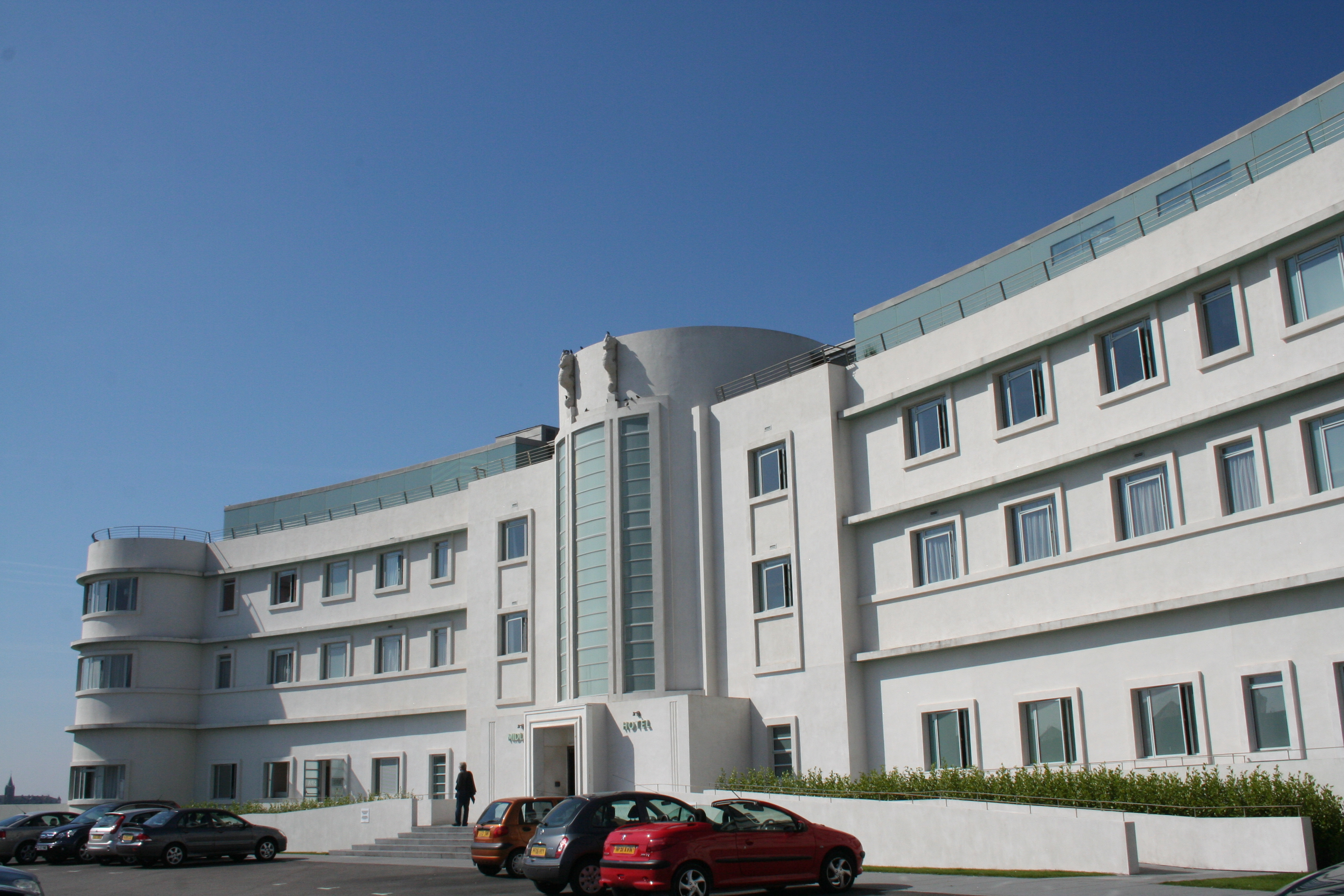
Midland Hotel, Morecambe (1933)

Oliver Falvey Hill (15 June 1887 – 29 April 1968) was a British architect, landscape architect, and garden designer. Starting as a follower of Edwin Lutyens, in the 1920s he gained a reputation as a designer of country houses. He turned towards architectural modernism in the 1930s, though in doing so he did not abandon his appreciation of natural materials. His plans made abundant use of curving lines. He also became known for luxurious interior decoration. Hill was the architect of the Midland Hotel in Morecambe, Lancashire and of the British pavilion at the Paris Exposition of 1937.

== Early years ==
Oliver Hill was born at 89 Queen's Gate, Kensington, to William Neave Hill, a London businessman, and his wife Kate Ida née Franks. The family had roots in Aberdeen and he retained a lifelong affection for Scotland, choosing to serve in the London Scottish Regiment during World War I. He ultimately gained the rank of captain.

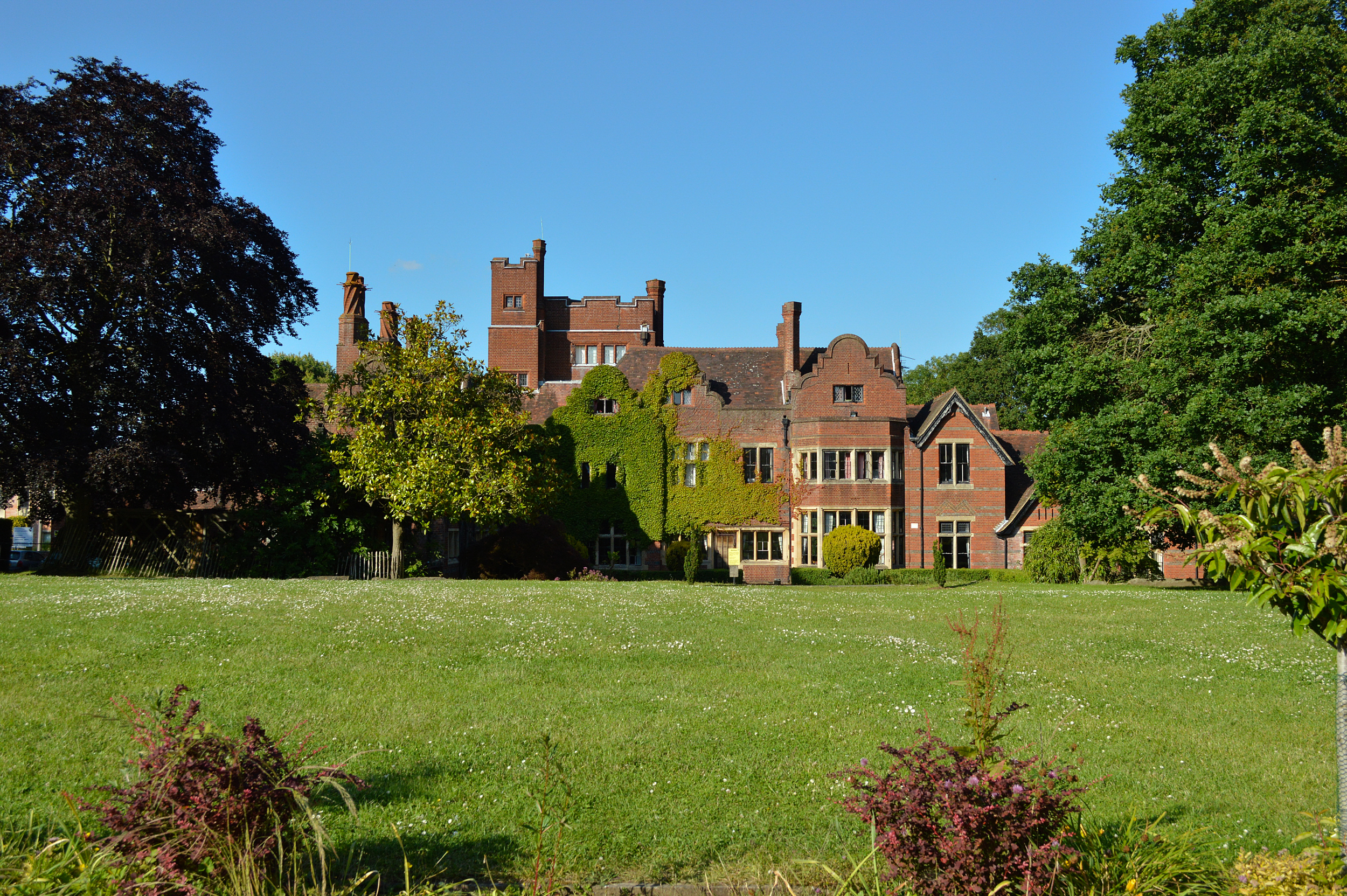
Moor Close, Berkshire (1914)

Hill was educated at Uppingham School. Following the suggestion of Edwin Lutyens, his early mentor, Hill's first step towards architecture was to gain experience in a builder's yard. In 1907 he became a pupil of architect William Flockhart. An interest in garden design was stimulated by a visit to the Garden of Eden in Venice, the garden of Frederic and Caroline Eden. She subsequently introduced him to her sister, the garden designer Gertrude Jekyll, who became a friend. Setting up his own office, Hill's first major project (1910–14) was Moor Close, in Berkshire, where he created a complementary composition of terraces and gardens around a Jacobethan house which he extended.

== Between the wars ==
In the 1920s Hill produced a number of Arts and Crafts style country houses, the best-known being The Thatched House in Warwickshire, Woodhouse Copse in Surrey, and Cock Rock in Devon. This group of three closely related designs, in which Hill produced distinctive combinations of locally sourced materials such as weatherboarding, thatch, brick and stone, was important in establishing his early reputation as a country house designer. The influence of Lutyens continued to be felt in Hill's country houses, and some of his town houses of the period have also been called "Lutyenesque".

Hill turned towards architectural modernism in the 1930s. On visiting the Stockholm Exhibition of 1930 he was impressed by the works of Gunnar Asplund. He was also influenced by his friend Christopher Hussey, Raymond McGrath and Mansfield Forbes. His work continued to be marked by his appreciation of the textures of natural materials, as well as by a predilection for curving lines, including very free or irregular ones.

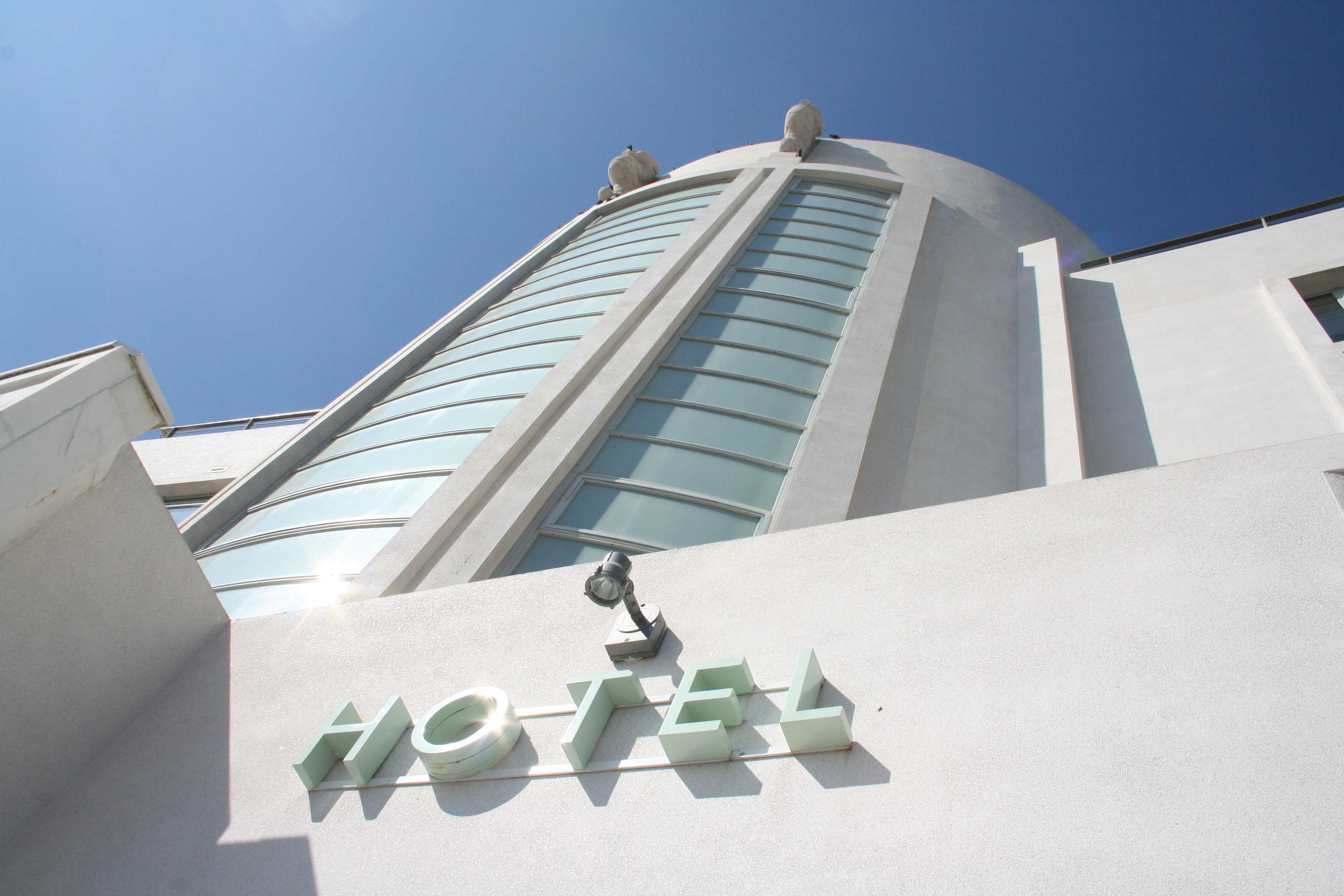
Midland Hotel, central tower (1933)

Hill's first major modernist project was Joldwynds in Surrey. The dominant feature of the Joldwynds plan, a curving front with a central, large-windowed circular stair-tower, recurred at the Midland Hotel in Lancashire, and at Holthanger, now known as Cherry Hill in Surrey. Landfall in Dorset had a circular stairhall as the house's central feature. The Prospect Inn in Kent was an oval-shaped pub, with a serpentine wall around the car park.

Hill was the lead designer for the Frinton Park Estate, an attempt at a modernist settlement in Essex, where a number of his curving buildings were constructed before the project failed. He was also the lead designer for the 1933 Exhibition of British Industrial Art in relation to the Home, in Dorland Hall, London, a successful showpiece for modernism conceived by Christopher Hussey, and also for the similar exhibition at Dorland Hall the following year.

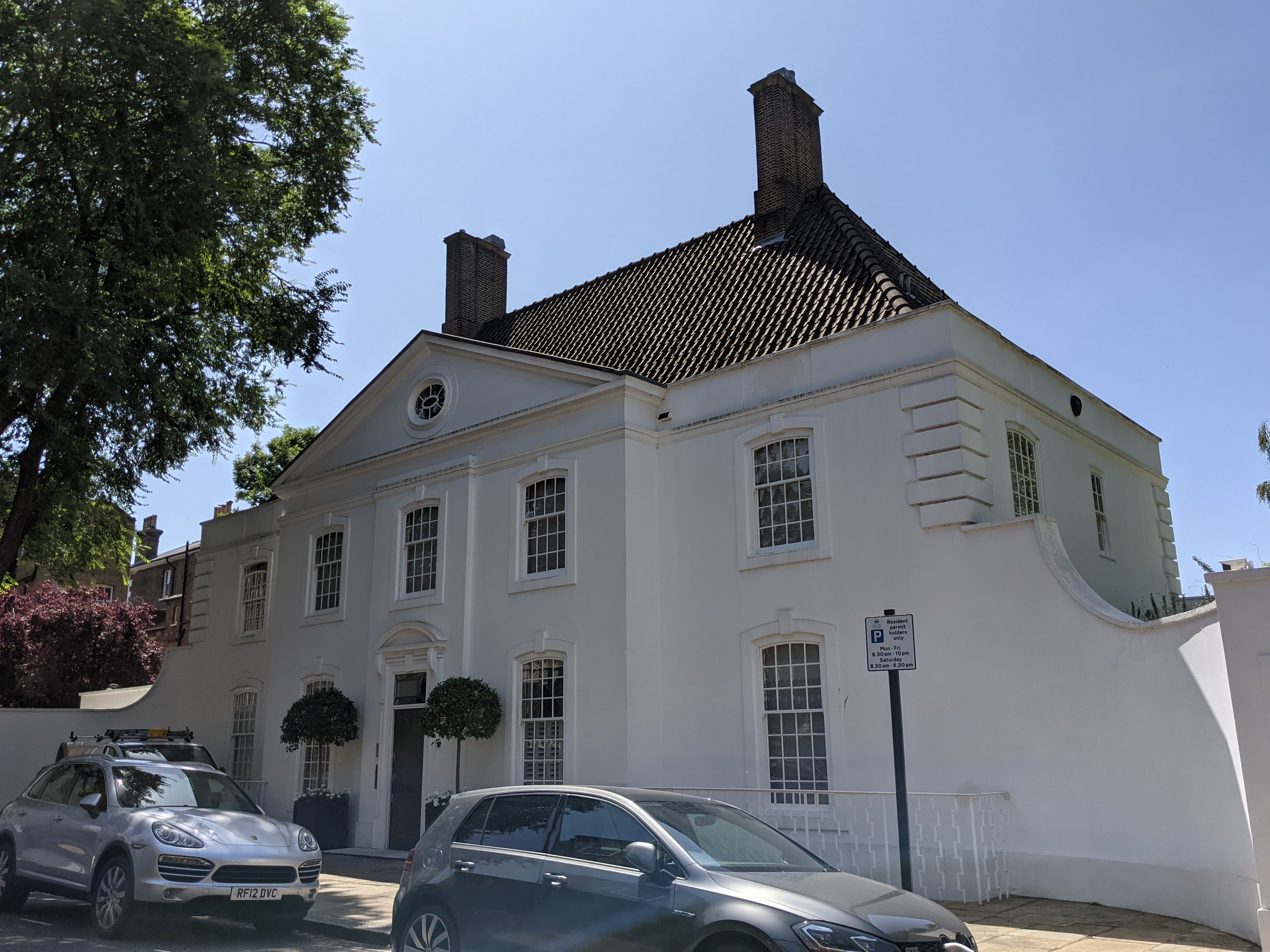
40 Chelsea Square, London (1930)

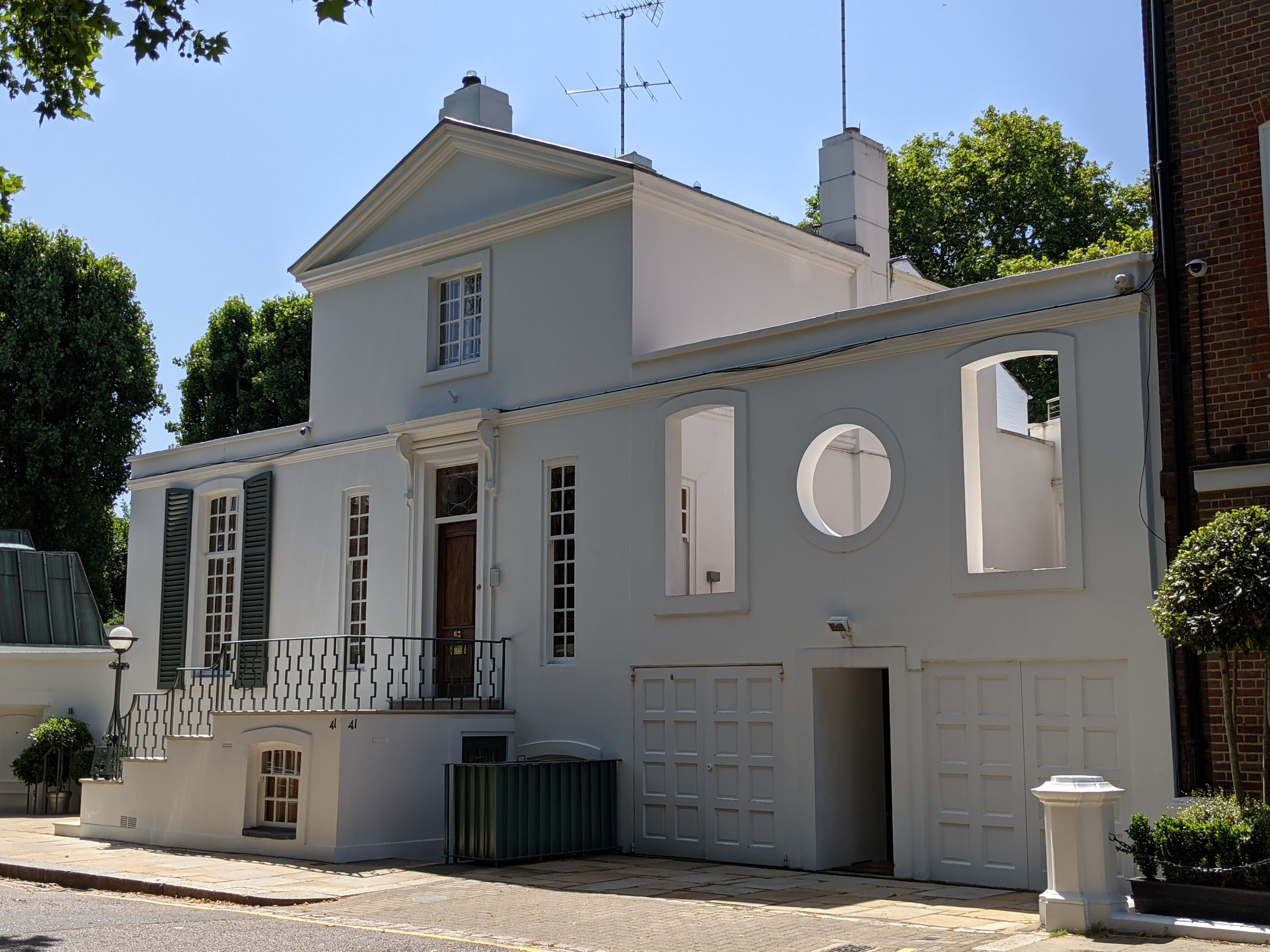
41 Chelsea Square, London (1934)

Hill also became known for luxurious interior decoration. The architectural historian Alan Powers has identified his style of decoration as "transitional modern", or "Vogue Regency", two roughly equivalent terms for a form of Art Deco. The best-known example was the second Gayfere House in Westminster (that is, the second house of that name built by Hill, for the same client), which featured mirrored walls and ceilings. Others were 40 and 41 Chelsea Square, and Upper Terrace House. He collaborated with the interior decorator Syrie Maugham, the creator of the "all-white room", in a redecoration of her house, 213 King's Road.

He designed the British pavilion at the Paris Exposition of 1937. When Frank Pick, the chairman of the Council for Art and Industry, appointed Hill as architect for the pavilion he told him to avoid modernism and to focus on the presentation of traditional crafts, and there was considerable criticism that the result was underwhelming compared to the other pavilions' nationalistic projections of strength. The British budget for its pavilion was only a small fraction of Germany's, however. The main architectural element of Hill's pavilion was a simple white box, but it contained a spiral ramp circling the display space, and other elements of the complex also contained prominent circular features.

== Later years ==
Hill blamed Adolf Hitler for ending his career, as his post-war career consisted of many designs but few built works. His designs covered a wide array of styles and his last house built in the 1960s, The Priory at Long Newnton, Gloucestershire, harked back to the 17th century.

== Personal life ==
Hill was elected a Fellow of the Royal Institute of British Architects in 1923. He was also a Fellow of the Royal Society of Arts and a Fellow of the Institute of Landscape Architects.

He kept a London townhouse first at 19 West Eaton Place, and later at 35 Cliveden Place. He also maintained a country residence, first from the mid 1920s at Valewood Farm, in Haslemere, Surrey, and then from 1948 at Daneway House, the former house and workshop of the Arts and Crafts architect-designer Ernest Gimson, in Sapperton, Gloucestershire.

In 1953 he married Margaret Jeanette Beverley; they had no children. She was the daughter of architect Samuel Beverley, and the granddaughter of theatrical architect Frank Verity. The sculptor Simon Verity was Hill's great-nephew, and has described his informal apprenticeship to Hill during his last years.

== Works ==
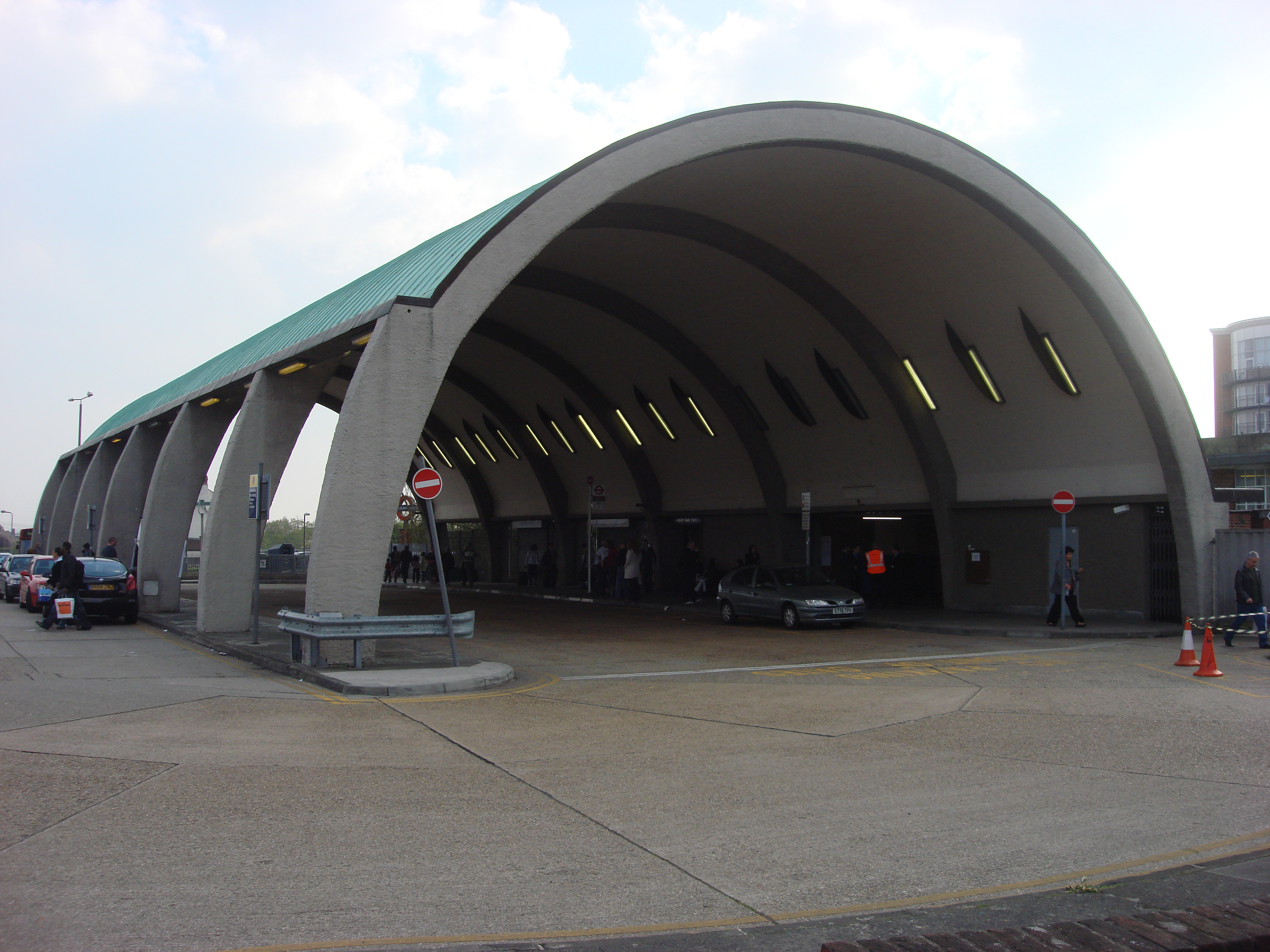
Bus shelter at Newbury Park tube station (1949)

- Moor Close, Binfield, Berkshire (alterations 1910–14)
- Cour, Carradale, Kintyre, Argyll (1920–22)
- Wilbraham House, Chelsea, London (1922)
- Gayfere House (also known as Gayfere Lodge), 12 Gayfere Street, Westminster, London (1923–26, and alterations 1934–36)
- The Thatched House, Knowle, Warwickshire (1923–29)
- Fox Steep, Wargrave, Berkshire (1924)
- Pottery exhibition stands at the British Empire Exhibition, Wembley, London (1924)
- Sandhill, Aldeburgh, Suffolk (1924)
- Woodhouse Copse, Holmbury St Mary, Surrey (1924–26)
- Cock Rock, Croyde, Devon (1925–26)
- Dolphin House, Aldeburgh, Suffolk (1926)
- Merryfields House, Witney, Oxfordshire (1927)
- Marylands, Ewhurst, Surrey (1927–31)
- Gayfere House, corner of Gayfere Street/Great Peter Street, Westminster, London (1929–32)(the second house of this name)
- Vernon House, 40 Chelsea Square, Chelsea, London (1930–34, GII*)
- Joldwynds, Holmbury St Mary, Surrey (1931–32)
- Upper Terrace House, Hampstead, London (remodelling 1931–33, GII)
- Midland Hotel, Morecambe, Lancashire (1932–33)
- 213 King's Road, Chelsea, London (alterations 1932–33)
- Katherine House, 41 Chelsea Square, Chelsea, London (1932–35, GII)
- Exhibition of British Industrial Art in relation to the Home, Dorland Hall, London (1933)
- Holthanger (now known as Cherry Hill, Virginia Water), Wentworth Estate, Surrey (1933–35)
- Exhibition of British Contemporary Industrial Design in the Home, Dorland Hall, London (1934)
- Frinton Park Estate, Frinton, Essex (1934–38), including:
  - Dawn (55 Quendon Way) (1934–35)
  - Seaspan (4 Audley Way) (1934–35)
  - The Round House (c. 1935)
- Landfall, Poole, Dorset (1936–38)
- Burrows Wood, Gomshall, Surrey (1936–39)
- Prospect Inn, Minster-in-Thanet, Kent (1936–39)
- British pavilion, Paris Exposition of 1937
- Three Lane Ends Infants' School, Methley Road, Whitwood Mere, Castleford, Yorkshire (1937–39) (Now known as Castleford Three Lane Ends Business Centre)
- Higher Trayne, Berrynarbor, Devon (alterations c. 1939–41)
- Bus shelter at Newbury Park tube station, Ilford, Essex (1947–50)
- The Pavilion, Kingston upon Thames, Surrey (1958–60)
- The Priory, Long Newnton, Gloucestershire (1963–66)

== Writings ==
- Fair Horizon: Buildings of To-day (1950)
- Scottish Castles of the Sixteenth and Seventeenth Centuries (1953)
- English Country Houses: Caroline, 1625–1685 (with John Cornforth) (1966)

== Sources ==
- Guise, Barry; Brook, Pam (2008). The Midland Hotel: Morecambe's White Hope. Lancaster: Palatine Books. ISBN 978-1-874181-55-2.
- Powers, Alan (1989). Oliver Hill: Architect and Lover of Life 1887–1968. London: Mouton Publications. ISBN 0-9514250-0-5.
- Powers, Alan (2005). Modern: The Modern Movement in Britain. London: Merrell. ISBN 1-85894-255-1.
- Powers, Alan (2008). The Twentieth Century House in Britain: From the Archives of Country Life. London: Aurum Press. ISBN 978-1-84513-012-1.
