= Joldwynds =

House in Holmbury St Mary, Surrey, England

- Location within Surrey
- 51°10′25″N 0°24′50″W
- Location: Holmbury St Mary
- OS grid reference: TQ 10972 42782

History
- Built: 1932

Site notes
- Area: Surrey
- Architect: Oliver Hill
- Architectural style: Modernist

Listed Building – Grade II
- Official name: Joldwynds
- Designated: 11 March 1987
- Reference no.: 1294332

Joldwynds is a modernist style house in Holmbury St Mary, Surrey, England, designed by architect Oliver Hill for Wilfred Greene, 1st Baron Greene. Completed in 1932, it is a Grade II listed building.

It replaced an 1874 Arts and Crafts style house designed by Philip Webb, which itself replaced an earlier house of that name.

Greene also had an additional house, The Wilderness, built in the grounds of Joldwynds, to a design by the modernist architectural partnership Tecton. This house, completed in 1939, is also Grade II listed.

== Arts and Crafts style house ==
The original house called Joldwynds was acquired by surgeon and anatomist William Bowman, later Baronet of Holmbury St Mary, following the death in 1870 of its owner, Henry Champion Wetton. In the same year, Bowman commissioned Philip Webb to design a replacement house in Arts and Crafts style, which was completed in 1874. It was square, with three gables on each of the four sides, plus a wing extending diagonally from one corner, containing a laboratory and a billiards room. The centre of the house was occupied by a three-storey, octagonal living hall, surrounded by round arches at ground level and an arcade on the next floor, and topped by a roof lantern. A stair turret and a barrel-vaulted library were added in 1893. The house became an influential example to other Arts and Crafts architects of the Victorian era.

This house was demolished in 1930 by barrister Wilfred Greene, later Baron Greene of Holmbury St Mary in the County of Surrey. Only its outbuildings remain, a stable block and a pavilion. These are both Grade II listed buildings, designed by Webb.

== Modernist style house ==
Greene commissioned Oliver Hill to design a new, modernist style house, completed in 1932. It was Hill's only modernist design before that of the Midland Hotel, Morecambe, Lancashire, which was completed in 1933.

The house has a T-shaped plan, with the stem of the T to the rear of the house. One wing is forward-curving, while the other wing and the stem of the T terminate in loggias and terraces. At the centre of the front elevation there is a large, curved window around a stair-tower. The house is topped by a central drum, from which a succession of flat roofs step down. The curving front and central stair-tower window were ideas that recurred in Hill's design for the Midland Hotel.

In the years immediately following its construction, the house required repairs to its rendering and to leaking roofs, leading Greene to sue Hill for compensation. The architect Margaret Lubetkin née Church was Greene's god daughter, and he consulted with Tecton, the modernist architectural practice led by her husband Berthold Lubetkin, intending to make alterations. Instead, he accepted Tecton's suggestion that another house could be built elsewhere in the grounds, for a similar cost.

== The Wilderness ==
The new house was built against a south-facing slope in a part of the Joldwynds estate known as the wilderness garden, and became known as The Wilderness. This time, Greene insisted on a pitched roof. Anticipating the outbreak of World War II, he also required that the construction should be achievable by a local builder, using a collection of building materials that Greene stockpiled as a precaution against wartime shortages.

The house was completed in 1939. Margaret Lubetkin was the principal designer. Unusually for Tecton, the design combined traditional with modernist elements. The house is largely of brick, with pitched slate roofs. In a more modern style, however, on the south, garden elevation there are concrete piers supporting balconies and a canopy. It is an early example of this kind of stylistic mixture.

== In media ==
The home appeared in the 1983 film The Hunger.

Joldwynds was later used as a location for the TV drama Agatha Christie's Poirot in several episodes, including "The Theft of the Royal Ruby" and "The Disappearance of Mr. Davenheim".

Joldwynds was the location for the filming of the 2020 remake of Noël Coward's Blithe Spirit.

== See also ==
- Woodhouse Copse, Holmbury St Mary (Oliver Hill, 1926)
