= Leptis Magna =

Ancient city in modern Libya

- Lepcis Magna, Neapolis, Lpqy
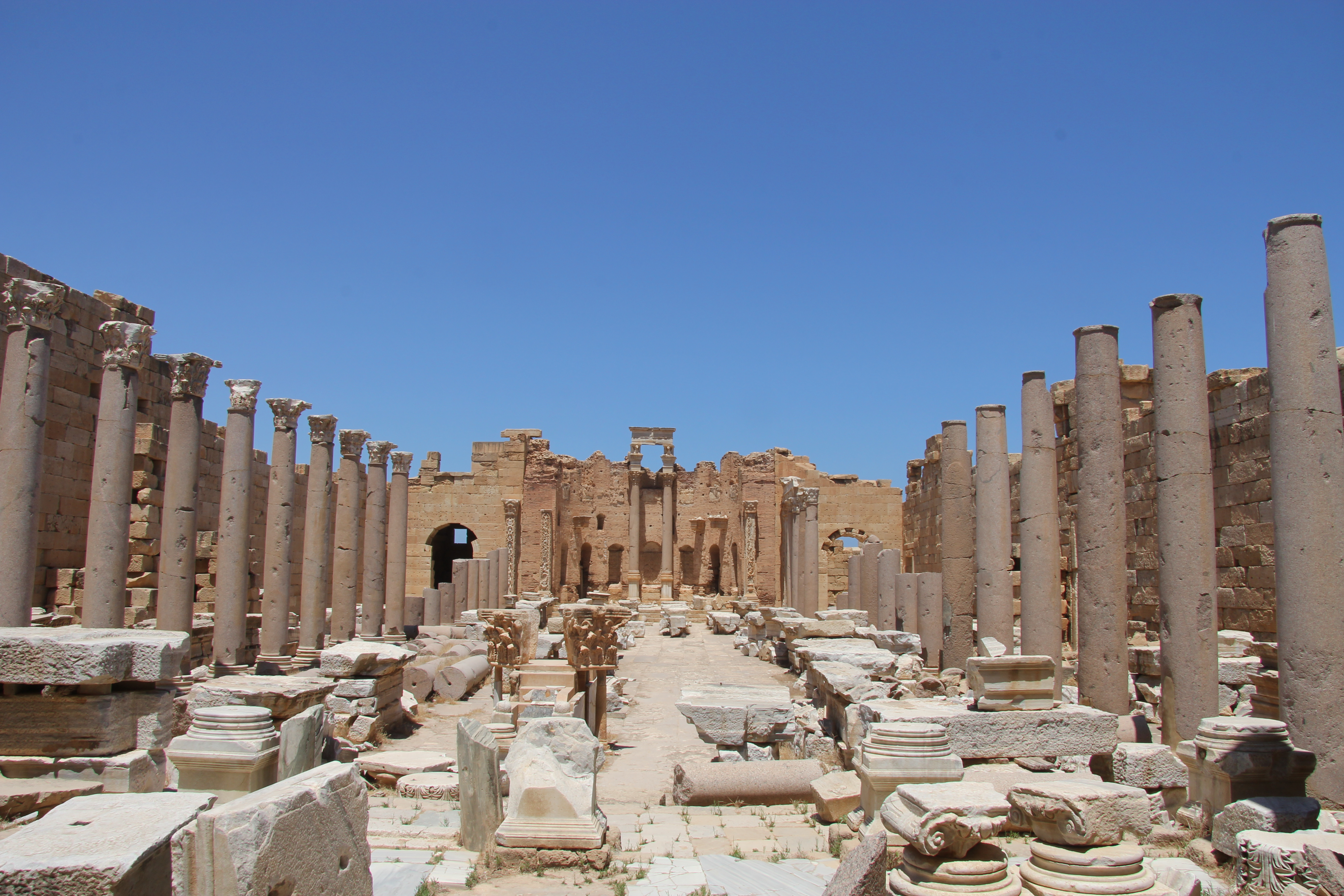
- The Severan Basilica at Leptis Magna

- Location within Libya
- 32°38′21″N 14°17′26″E
- Type: Settlement
- Periods: Iron Age to Byzantine
- Cultures: Carthaginian; Roman
- Location: Al-Khums, Libya
- Region: Tripolitania

History
- Built: 1000 BC
- Abandoned: 7th c. AD

UNESCO World Heritage Site
- Official name: Archaeological Site of Leptis Magna
- Type: Cultural
- Criteria: i, ii, iii
- Designated: 1982 (6th session)
- Reference no.: 183
- Region: North Africa

Leptis or Lepcis Magna, (Arabic: لبدة الكبرى, romanized: Libda al-Kubrā) also known by other names in antiquity, was a prominent city of the Carthaginian Empire and Roman Libya at the mouth of the Wadi Lebda in the Mediterranean.

Established as a Punic settlement prior to 500 BC, the city experienced significant expansion under Roman Emperor Septimius Severus (r. 193–211), who was born in the city. The 3rd Augustan Legion was stationed here to defend the city against Berber incursions. After the legion's dissolution under Gordian III in 238, the city was increasingly open to raids in the later part of the 3rd century. Diocletian reinstated the city as provincial capital, and it grew again in prosperity until it fell to the Vandals in 439. It was reincorporated into the Eastern Empire in 533 but continued to be plagued by Berber raids and never recovered its former importance. It fell to the Muslim invasion in c. 647 and was subsequently abandoned.

After being abandoned, the city was remarkably preserved as it lay buried beneath layers of sand dunes. In the 1920s, the city was unearthed by Italian archaeologists during Italy's occupation of Libya. Its ruins are within present-day Al-Khums, Libya, 130 km (81 mi) east of Tripoli. They are among the best-preserved Roman sites in the Mediterranean.

== Names ==
The Punic name of the settlement was written lpq (Punic: 𐤋𐤐𐤒) or lpqy (𐤋𐤐𐤒𐤉). This has been tentatively connected to the Semitic root (present in Arabic) lfq, meaning "to build" or "to piece together", presumably in reference to the construction of the city.

This name was hellenized as Léptis (Ancient Greek: Λέπτις), also known as Léptis Megálē (Λέπτις μεγάλη, "Greater Leptis") distinguishing it from the "Lesser Leptis" closer to Carthage in modern-day Tunisia. It was also known by the Greeks as Neápolis (Νεάπολις, "New Town"). The latinization of these names was Lepcis or Leptis Magna ("Greater Leptis"), which also appeared as the "Leptimagnese City" (Latin: Leptimagnensis Civitas). The Latin demonym was "Leptitan" (Leptitanus). It was also known as Ulpia Traiana as a Roman colony, after Emperor Trajan of the Ulpia gens. Its Italian name is Lepti Maggiore, and in Arabic it is named Labdah (لَبْدَة).

== History ==
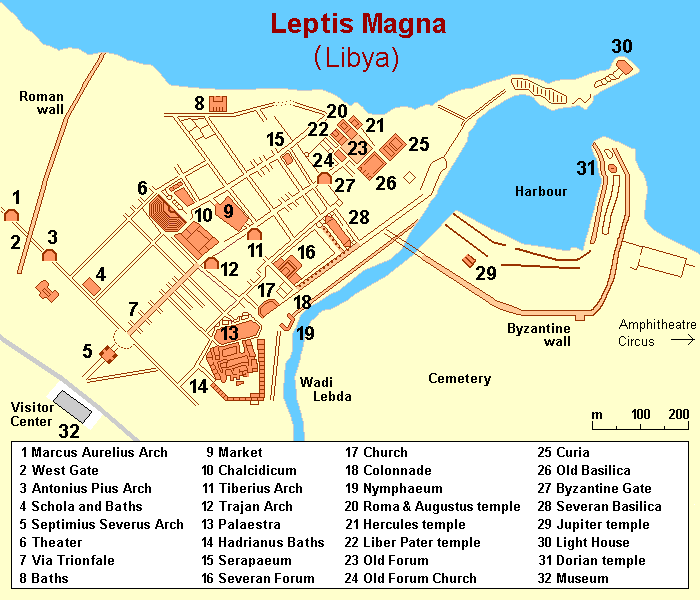
Map of Leptis Magna

=== Punics ===
The Punic city was founded in the second half of the 7th century BC. Little is known about Leptis during this time, but it appears to have been powerful enough to repel Dorieus's attempt to establish a Greek colony nearby around 515 BC. Like most Punic settlements, Leptis became part of the Carthaginian Empire and fell under Rome's control with Carthage's defeat in the Punic Wars. Leptis remained highly independent for a period after about 111 BC.

=== Roman Republic ===
In 111 BC, during the Jugurthine War, the city sent envoys to the Roman Senate asking for the friendship and alliance of Rome, to which it provided assistance against Jugurtha, and obtained in 107 BC the deployment of four cohorts and some colonists from the consul Quintus Caecilius Metellus Numidicus. At the end of the war, however, the city remained part of the Numidian kingdom, obtaining the status of civitas foederata and retaining its autonomy, until it was included in the Roman province of Africa after the civil war between the Caesarians and the Pompeians. The city nonetheless became part of the Roman domains as libera et immunis, gaining the right to mint coins in silver and bronze. Reflecting its blend of cultures, its coins bore Punic inscriptions but images of Hercules and Dionysus. The 40-20s BC saw many Italians begin to settle in North Africa mostly due to being dispossessed from their land. Italian merchants also began to settle in Leptis Magna and started a profitable commerce with the Libyan interior. The city depended primarily on the fertility of its surrounding farmland, where many olive-presses have been excavated. By 46 BC, its olive oil production was of such an extent that the city was able to provide three million pounds of oil annually to Julius Caesar as tax.

=== Roman Empire ===
Kenneth D. Matthews Jr. writes:

During the reign of Augustus, Leptis Magna was classified as a civitas libera et immunis, or a free community, over which the governor had an absolute minimum of control. As such Leptis retain its two suphetes at the head of its government, with the mhzm, similar to the Roman aediles, as minor magistrates. In addition there were such sacred officials as the ʾaddir ʾararim or praefectus sacrorum, the nēquim ēlīm, and probably a sacred college of fifteen members.

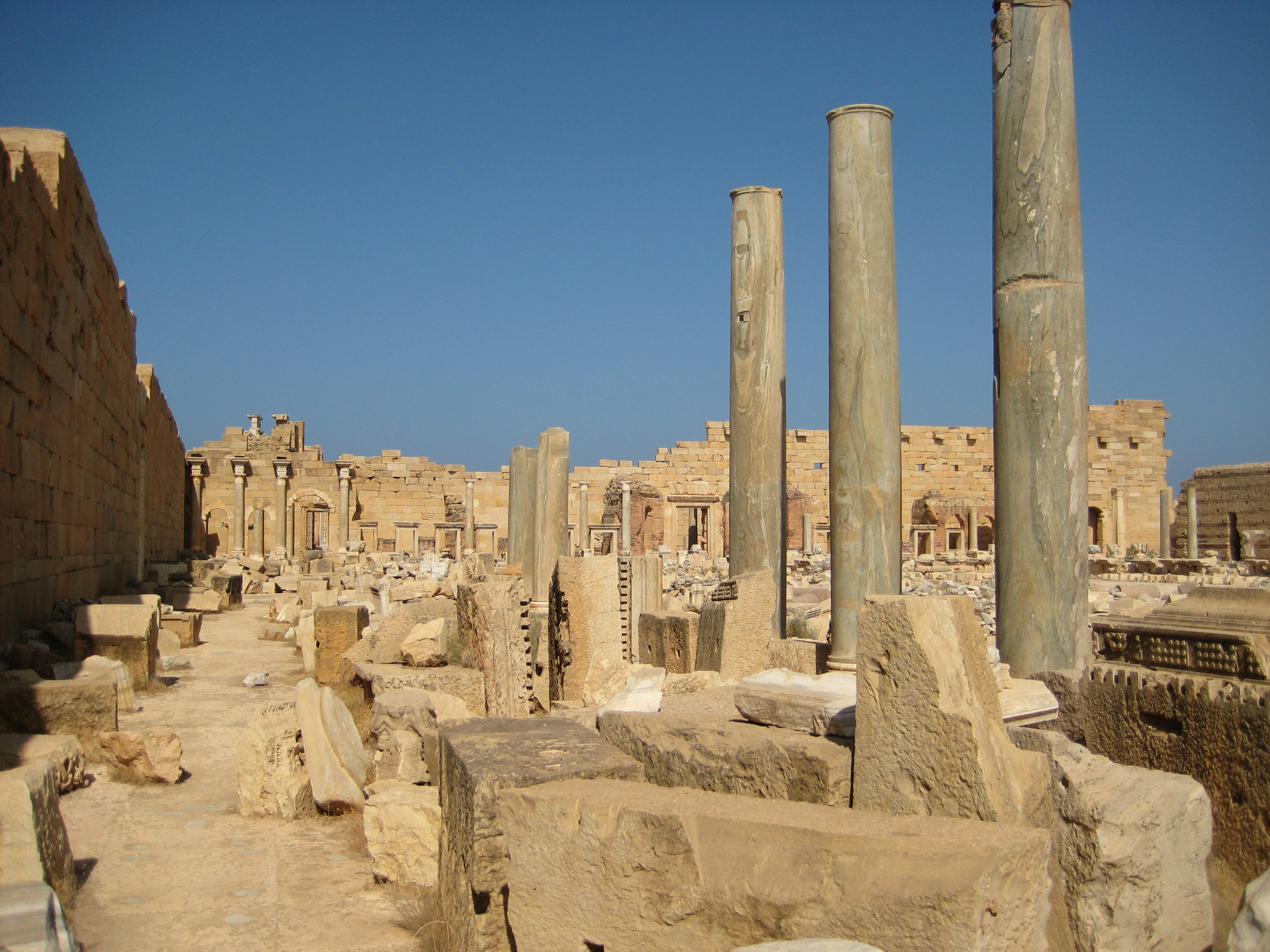
The Severan Forum

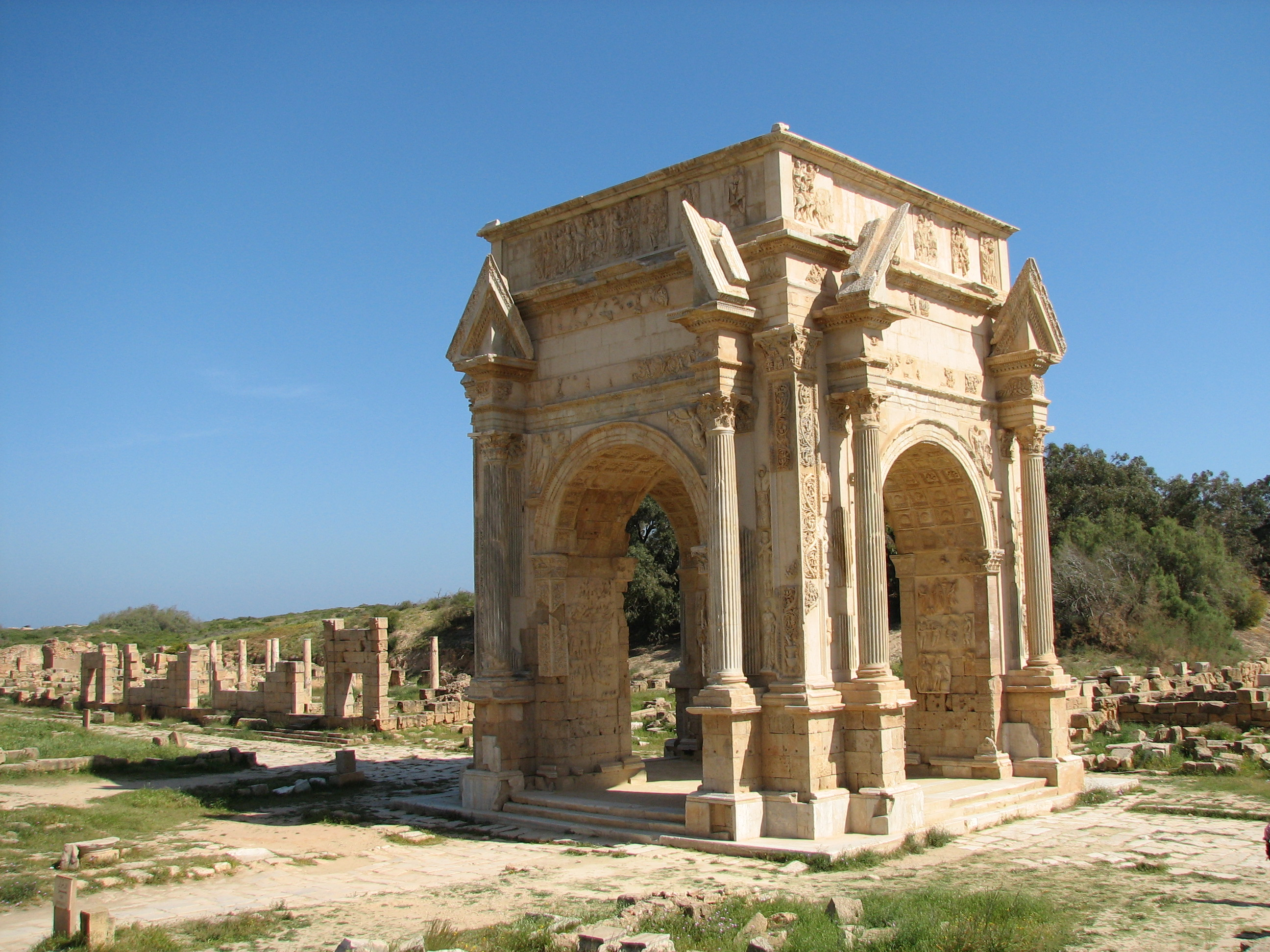
Arch of Septimius Severus

Leptis Magna remained as such until the reign of the Roman emperor Tiberius, when the city and the surrounding area were formally incorporated into the empire as part of the province of Africa. It soon became one of the leading cities of Roman Africa and a major trading post. The city grew rapidly under Roman administration. During the reign of Nero, an amphitheater was constructed. The settlement was elevated to municipium in AD 64 or 65 and to colonia under Trajan (r. 98–117). The first known bishop of Leptis Magna was a certain priest called Victor who became pope in 189.

Leptis achieved its greatest prominence beginning in AD 193, as the hometown of emperor Septimius Severus. Severus came from a distinguished, wealthy family of equestrian rank in the city. His grandfather was a prominent local magistrate in Leptis Magna, which was elevated to colony status under Emperor Trajan. Even after becoming emperor, Severus's own family would continue to inhabit the city. Severus favored his hometown above all other provincial cities, investing in its development, both through the consolidation of its borders, with the expansion of the Limes Tripolitanus towards Garama, and by promoting its urban regeneration, establishing the city as the third largest port in the Mediterranean during the third century. In 205 AD, he and the imperial family visited the city and bestowed great honors. Among the changes that Severus introduced were the creation of a magnificent new forum, the construction of a massive basilica and the rebuilding of the docks. Severus also granted the ius Italicum, and the inhabitants of the city also became known as Septimiani in his honor. During the early 3rd century AD, the city was in its period of greatest splendor, reaching a population of about 100,000 inhabitants at its height.

Leptis prospered through trans-Saharan trade in various valuable goods, including ivory, wild animals for the gladiatorial arena, gold dust, carbuncle, precious woods like ebony, and ostrich feathers.

Leptis overextended itself during this period. During the Crisis of the 3rd Century, when trade declined precipitously, Leptis Magna's importance also fell into a decline, and by the middle of the 4th century, even before it was completely devastated by the 365 tsunami, large parts of the city had been abandoned. Ammianus Marcellinus recounts that the crisis was worsened by a corrupt Roman governor named Romanus, who demanded bribes to protect the city during a major tribal raid. The ruined city could not pay these and complained to the emperor Valentinian I. Romanus then bribed people at court and arranged for the Leptan envoys to be punished "for bringing false accusations". It enjoyed a minor renaissance beginning in the reign of the emperor Theodosius I.

=== Vandal Kingdom ===
In 439, Leptis Magna and the rest of the cities of Tripolitania fell under the control of the Vandals when their king, Gaiseric, captured Carthage from the Romans and made it his capital. Unfortunately for the future of Leptis Magna, Gaiseric ordered the city's walls demolished so as to dissuade its people from rebelling against Vandal rule. The people of Leptis and the Vandals both paid a heavy price for this in AD 523 when a group of Berber raiders sacked the city.

=== Byzantine Empire ===
Belisarius, general of Emperor Justinian I, recaptured Leptis Magna in the name of the Roman Empire ten years later, and in 533–4 it was re-incorporated into the empire. Leptis became a provincial capital of the Eastern Empire, but never recovered from the destruction wreaked upon it by the Berbers. In 544, under the prefecture of Sergius, the city came under intensified attack of Berber tribes, and after some successes, Sergius was reduced to retreating into the city, with the Leuathae tribal confederation camped outside the gate demanding payments. Sergius admitted eighty deputies into the city to present their demands, but when Sergius moved to leave the conference he was detained by the robe by one deputy and crowded by others. This provoked an officer of the prefect's guard to kill the deputy laying hands on the prefect, which resulted in a general massacre. The Berbers reacted with an all-out attack and Sergius was eventually forced to abandon Leptis and retreat to Carthage.

=== Islamic conquest ===
By the 6th century, the city was fully Christianized. During the decade 565–578 AD, Christian missionaries from Leptis Magna even began to move once more among the Berber tribes as far south as the Fezzan in the Libyan desert and converted the Garamantes. Numerous new churches were built in the 6th century, but the city continued to decline, and by the time of the Arab conquest around 647 the city was mostly abandoned except for a Byzantine garrison force and a population of less than 1,000 inhabitants. By the 10th century, the city of Al-Khums had fully absorbed it.

=== Excavation ===
Today, the site of Leptis Magna is the site of some of the best preserved ruins of the Roman period.

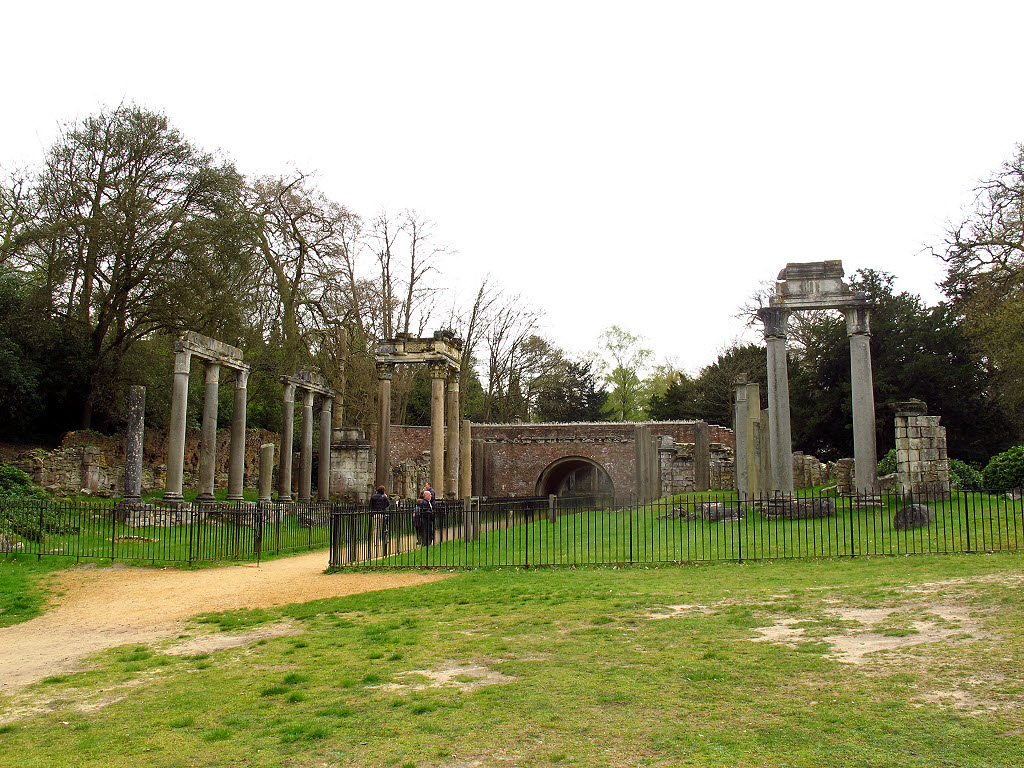
Leptis Magna ruins, in the United Kingdom, by the Virginia Water Lake

Part of an ancient temple was brought from Leptis Magna to the British Museum in 1816 and installed at the Fort Belvedere royal residence in England in 1826. It now lies in part of Windsor Great Park. The ruins are located between the south shore of Virginia Water and Blacknest Road close to the junction with the A30 London Road and Wentworth Drive.

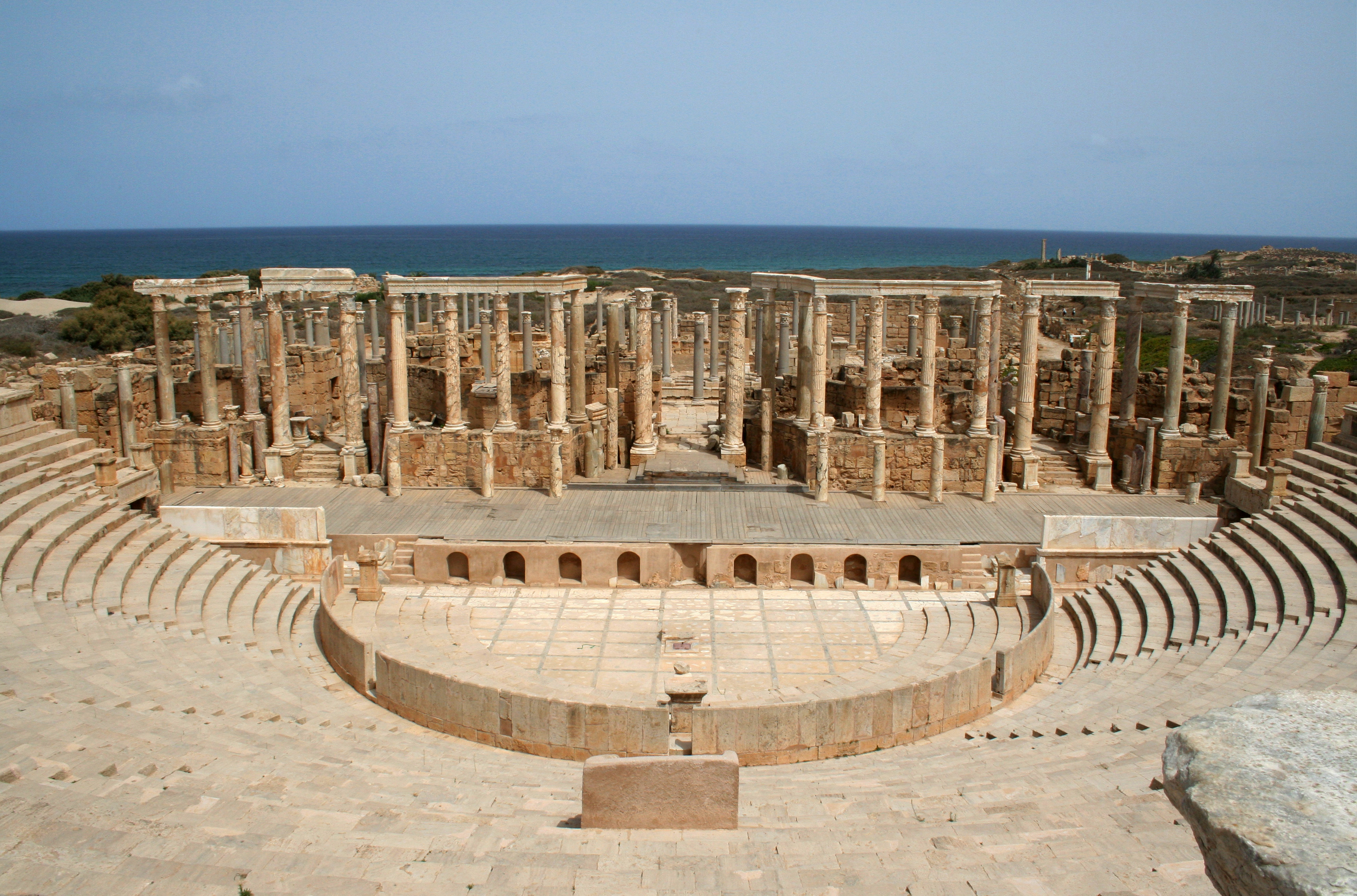
The Roman theatre

When Italians conquered Italian Libya in the early 20th century, they dedicated huge efforts to the rediscovery of Leptis Magna. One of the first buildings uncovered during Renato Bartoccini's 1925-1926 excavation was the Arch of Septimius Severus at Leptis Magna. Bartoccini's preliminary finds were published in Africa Italiana 4 in 1931. In the early 1930s, Italian archeological research was able to show again the buried remains of nearly all the city. A 4th to 3rd century BC necropolis was found under the Roman theatre.

In June 2005, it was revealed that archaeologists from the University of Hamburg had been working along the coast of Libya when they uncovered a 30ft length of five colorful mosaics created during the 1st or 2nd century. The mosaics show with exceptional clarity depictions of a warrior in combat with a deer, four young men wrestling a wild bull to the ground, and a gladiator resting in a state of fatigue and staring at his slain opponent. The mosaics decorated the walls of a cold plunge pool in a balneae within a Roman villa at Wadi Lebda in Leptis Magna. The gladiator mosaic is noted by scholars as one of the finest examples of representational mosaic art ever seen—a "masterpiece comparable in quality with the Alexander Mosaic in Pompeii." The mosaics were originally discovered in the year 2000 but were kept secret in order to avoid looting. They are currently on display in the Leptis Magna Museum.

There were reports that Leptis Magna was used as a cover for tanks and military vehicles by pro-Gaddafi forces during the First Libyan Civil War in 2011. When asked if the historic site could be targeted in an airstrike, NATO refused to rule out the possibility of such an action, saying that it had not been able to confirm the rebels' report that weapons were being hidden at the location. Shortly after the war, Libyan archaeologist Hafed Walda reported that Leptis Magna, along with nearby Rasaimergib Fort and the western Tripolis of Sabratha, had "so far seen no visible loss" from either fighting on the ground or bombings conducted by international forces.

In the midst of the Second Libyan Civil War and the disappearance of governmental and international support for the site, people living in the area organized to voluntarily protect and maintain Leptis Magna.

== Climate change ==
Since they are located on the coast, Leptis Magna ruins are vulnerable to sea level rise. In 2022, the IPCC Sixth Assessment Report included them in the list of African cultural sites which would be threatened by flooding and coastal erosion by the end of the century, but only if climate change followed RCP 8.5, which is the scenario of high and continually increasing greenhouse gas emissions associated with the warming of over 4 °C., and is no longer considered very likely. The other, more plausible scenarios result in lower warming levels and consequently lower sea level rise: yet, sea levels would continue to increase for about 10,000 years under all of them. Even if the warming is limited to 1.5 °C, global sea level rise is still expected to exceed 2–3 m (7–10 ft) after 2000 years (and higher warming levels will see larger increases by then), consequently exceeding 2100 levels of sea level rise under RCP 8.5 (~0.75 m (2 ft) with a range of 0.5–1 m (2–3 ft)) well before the year 4000. Thus, it is a matter of time before the Leptis Magna ruins are threatened by rising water levels, unless they can be protected by adaptation efforts such as sea walls.

== Gallery ==
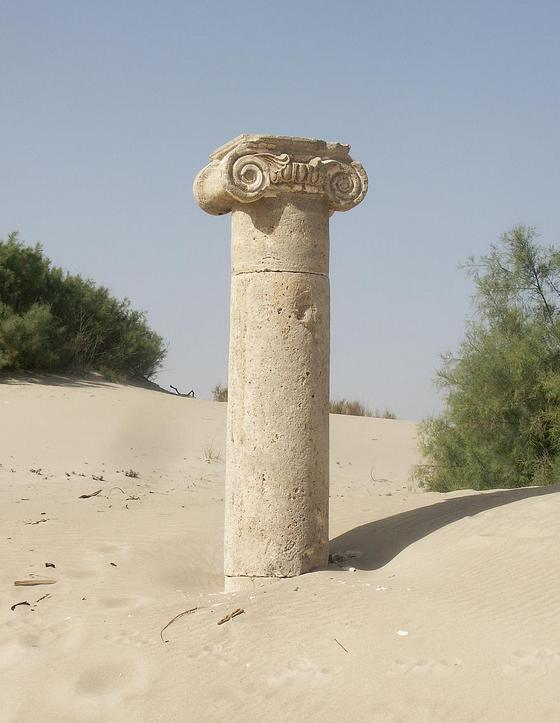
Some of Leptis Magna yet to be excavated

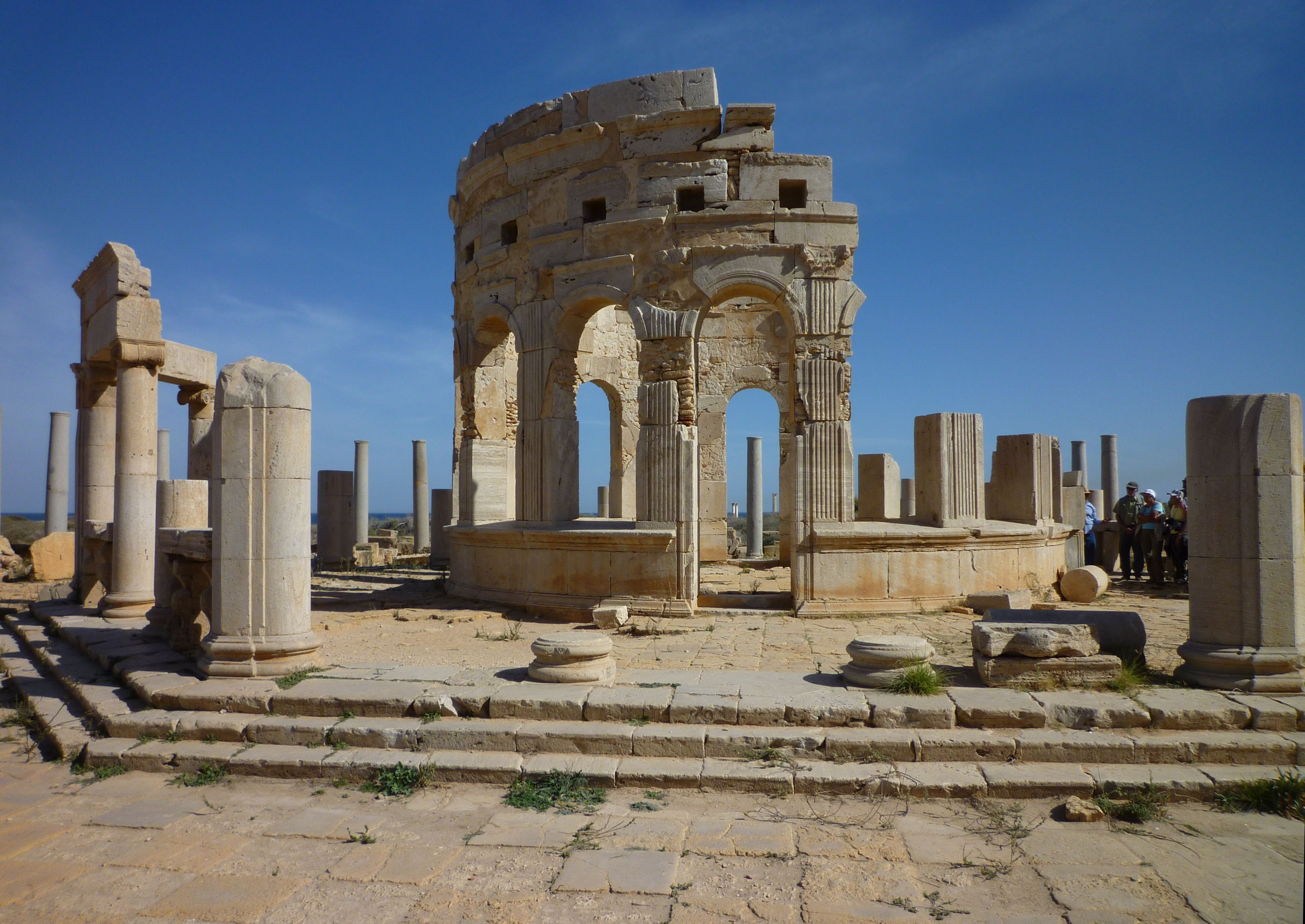
Market place

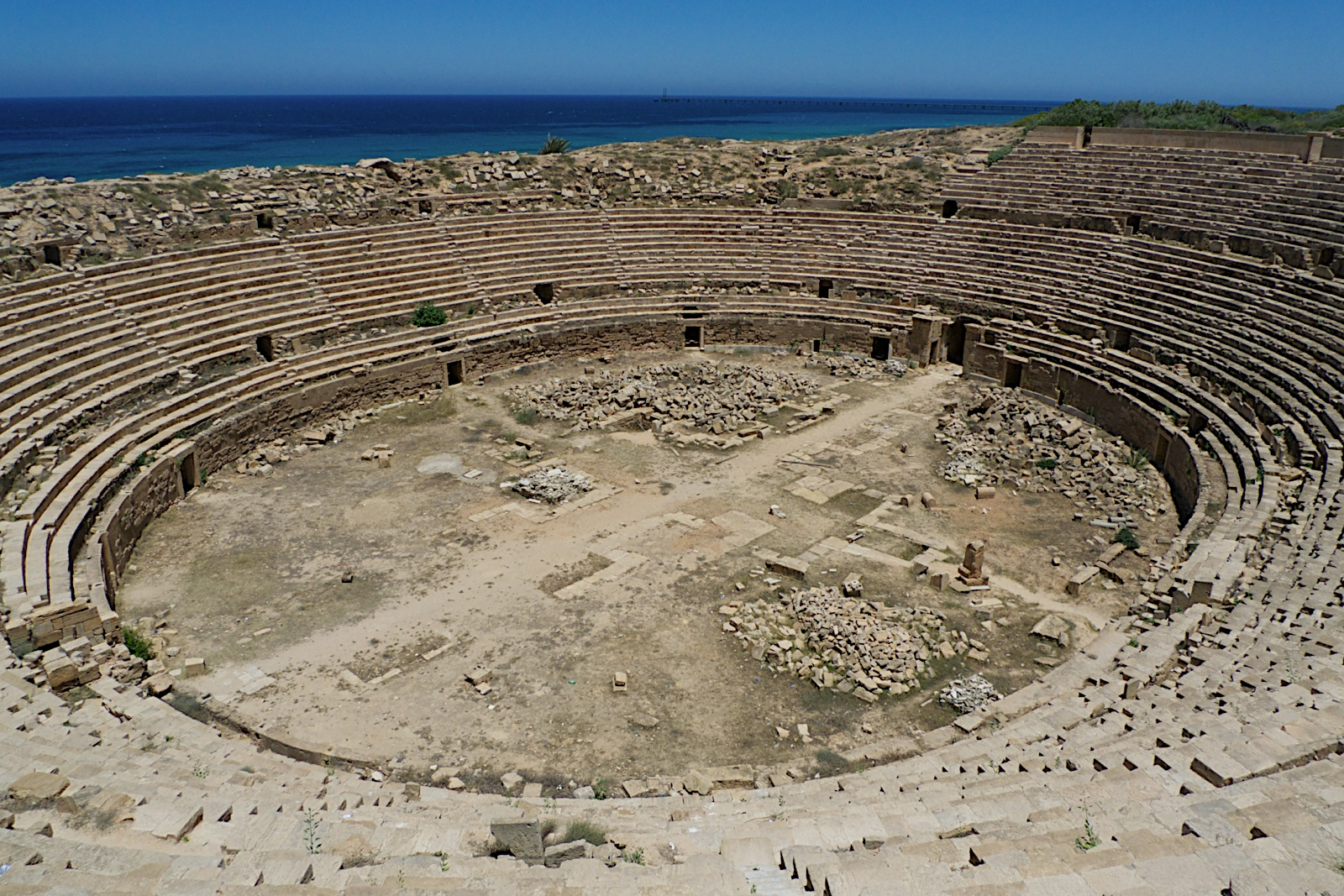
Amphitheater

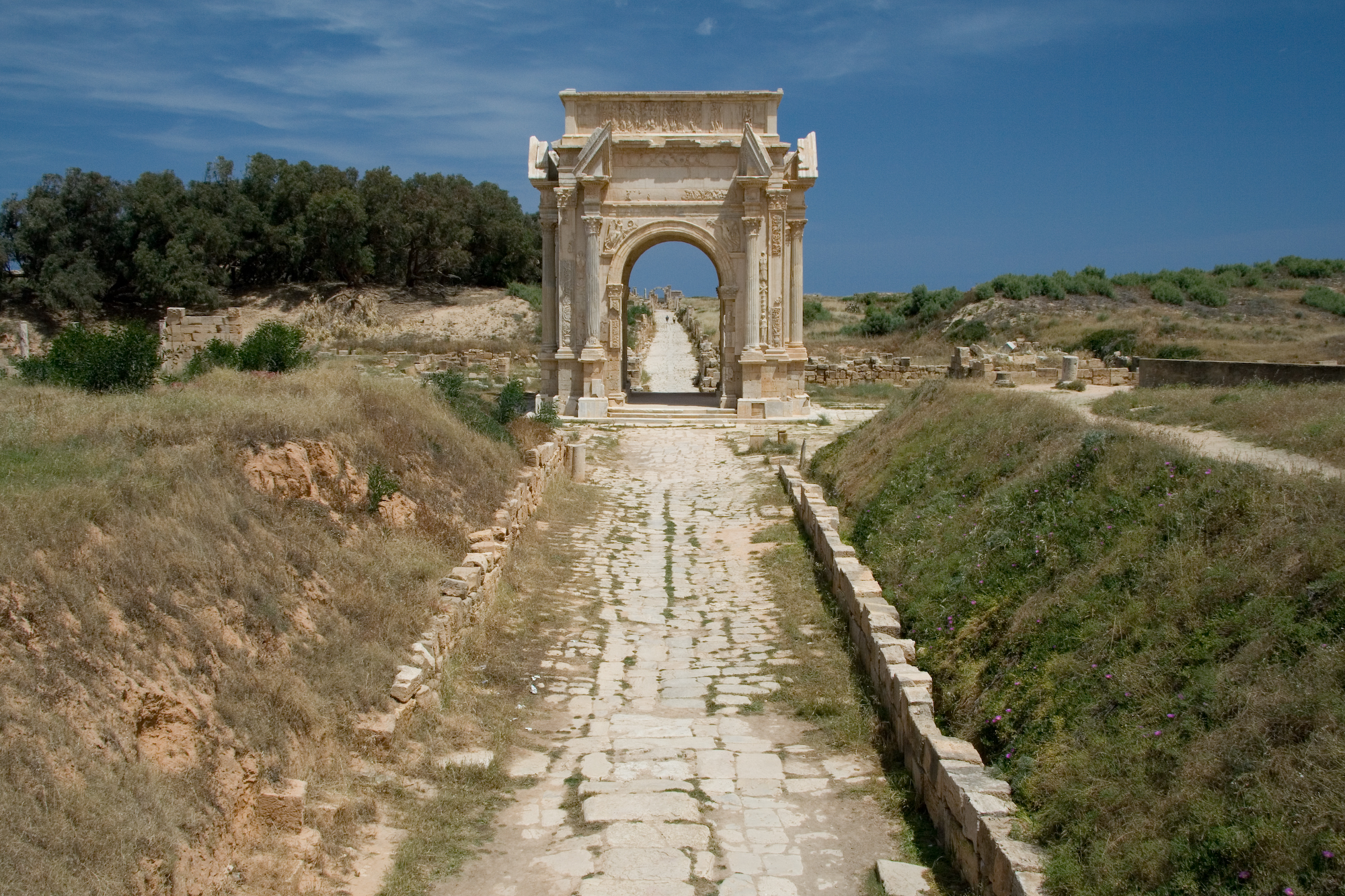
Arch of Septimius Severus

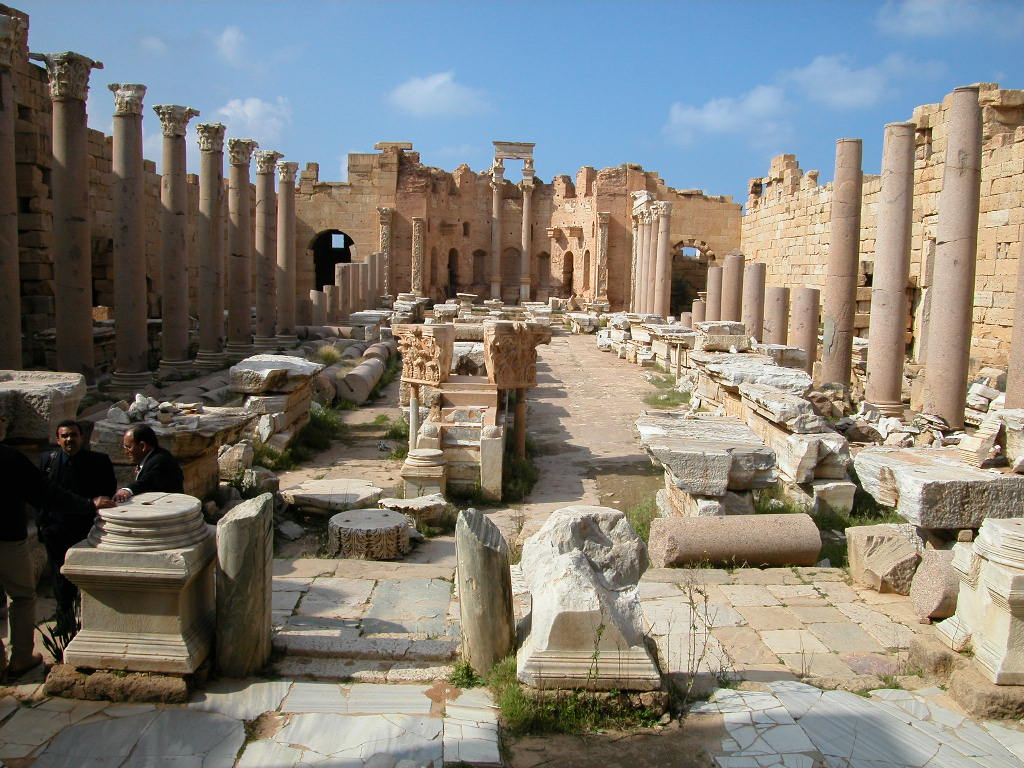
Severan Basilica

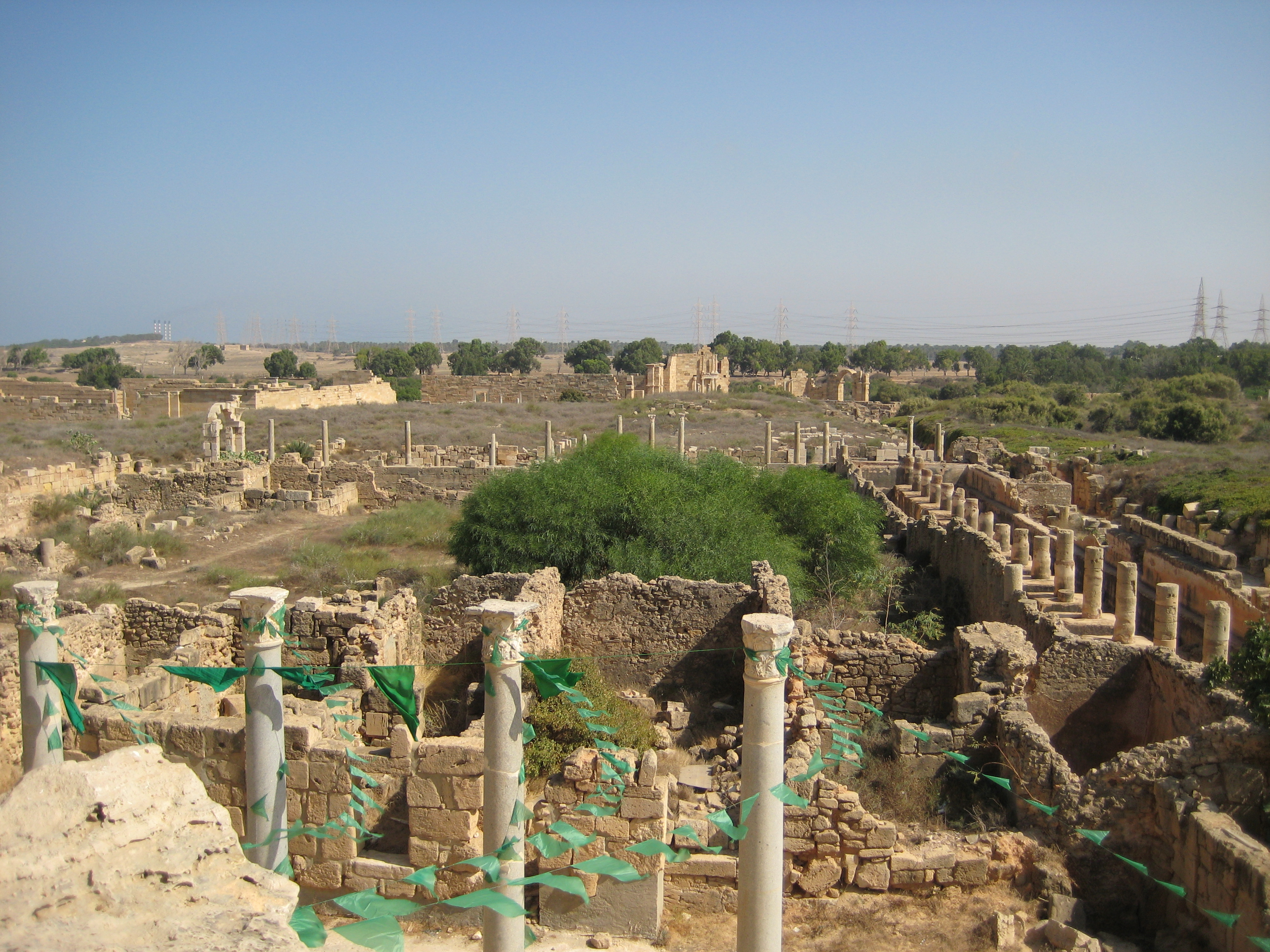
View of Leptis Magna from the theater wall

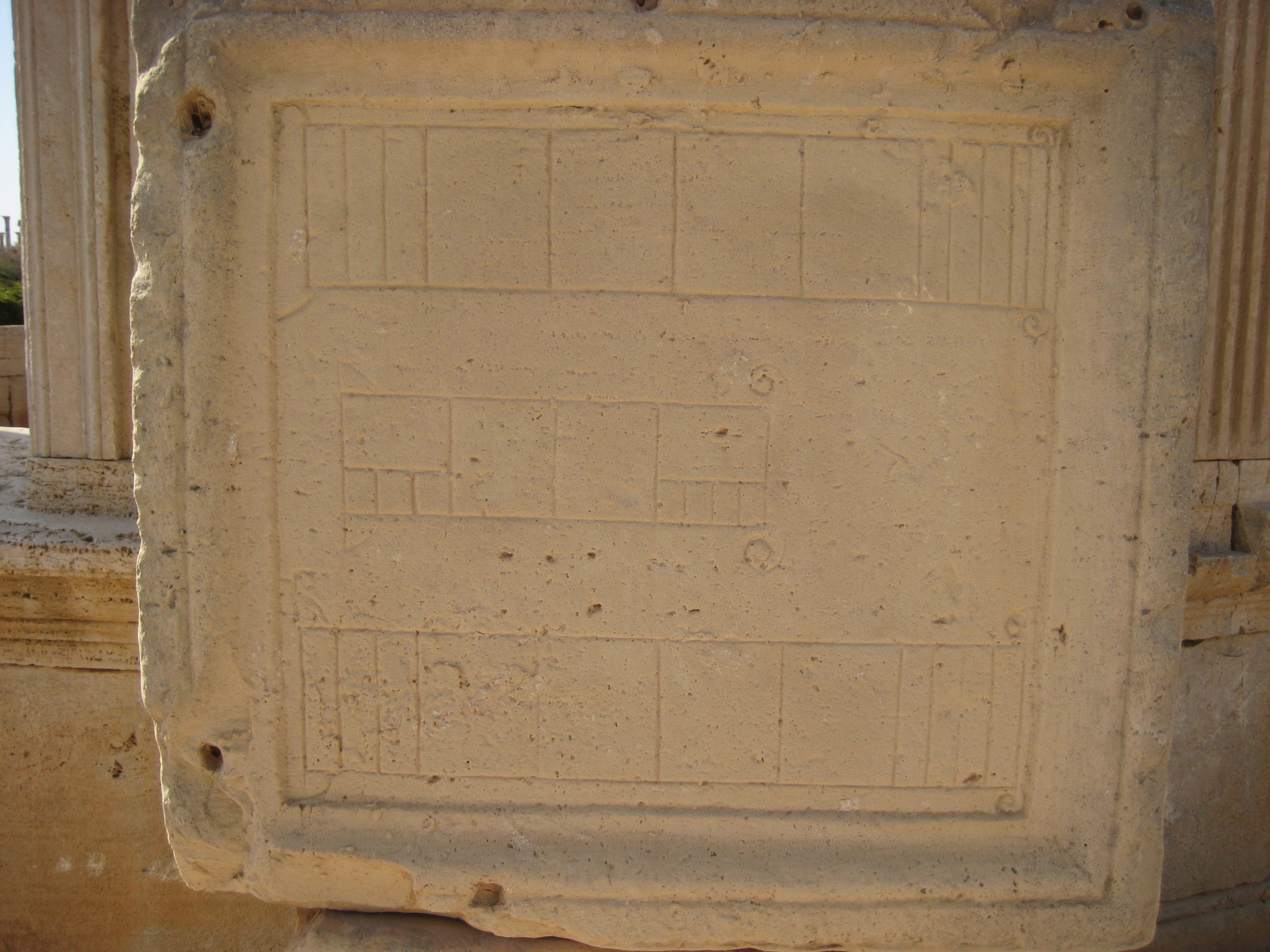
Measure converter, Market (founded 8 or 9 BC) (Phoenician colony)

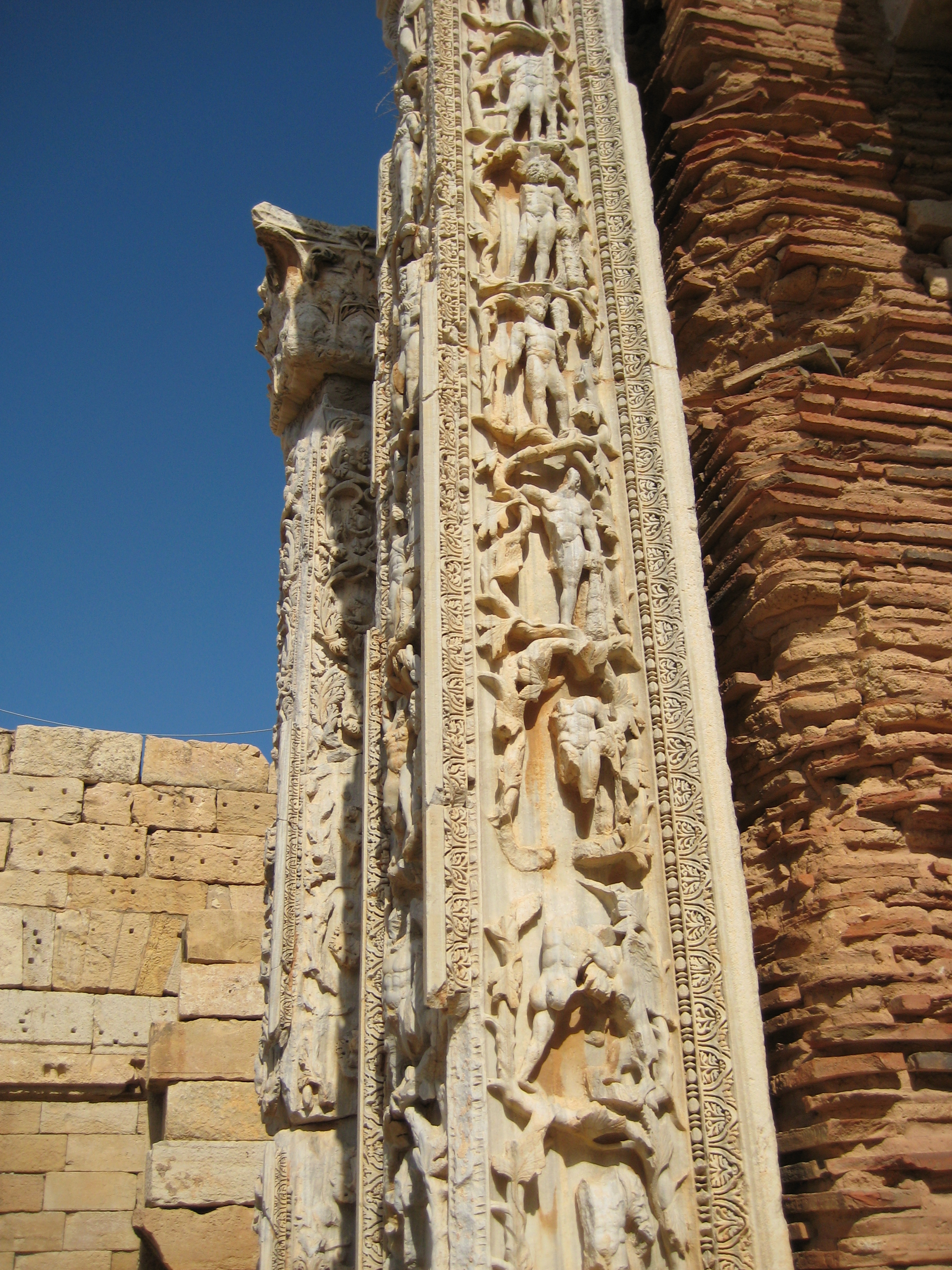
Decorative columns inside Basilica of Septimius Severus

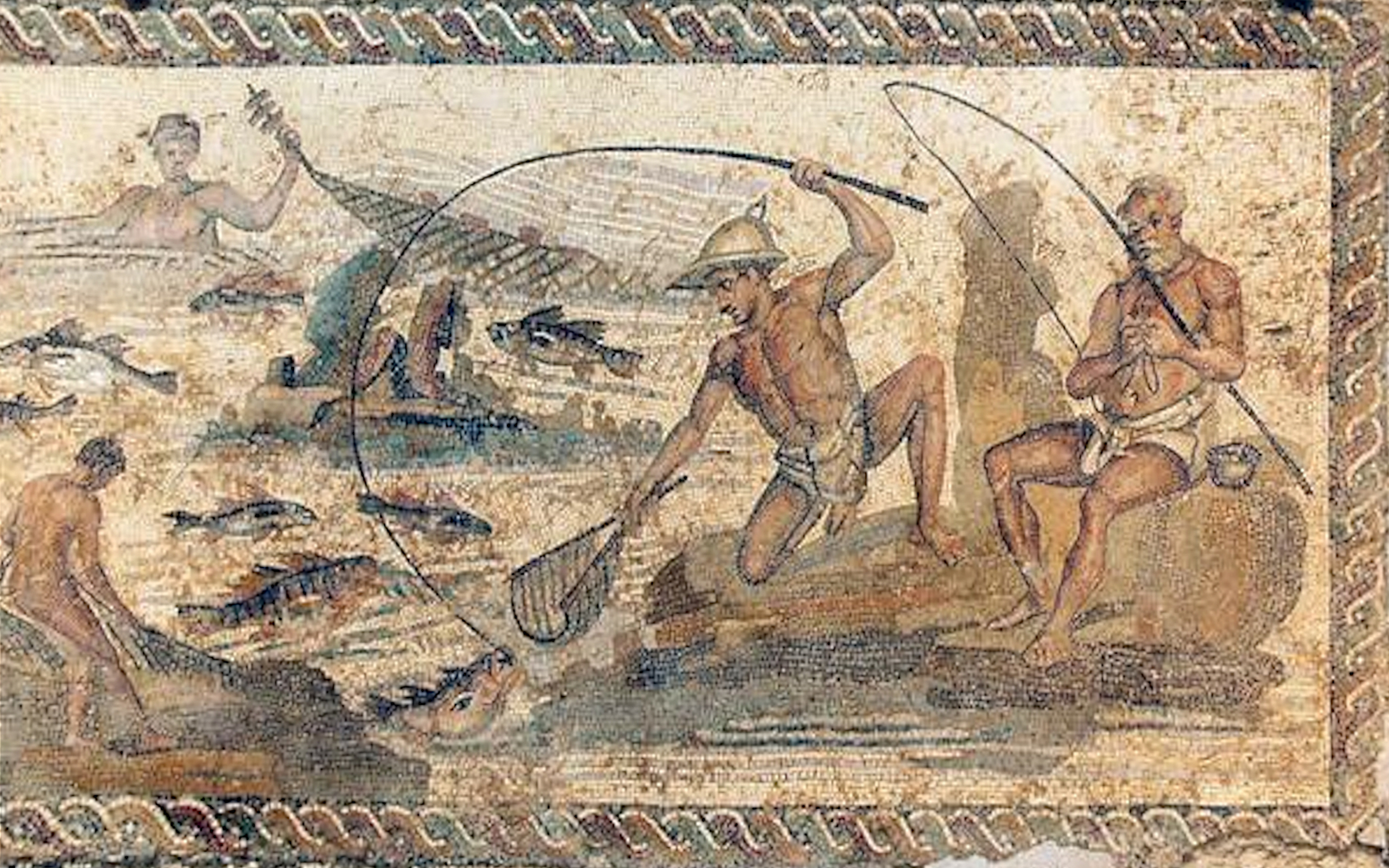
Angling in the 1st century AD. Villa of the Nile Mosaic, Leptis Magna, Tripoli National Museum

== See also ==
- Libya in the Roman era
