= Virginia Water (lake) =

Lake in Surrey, England

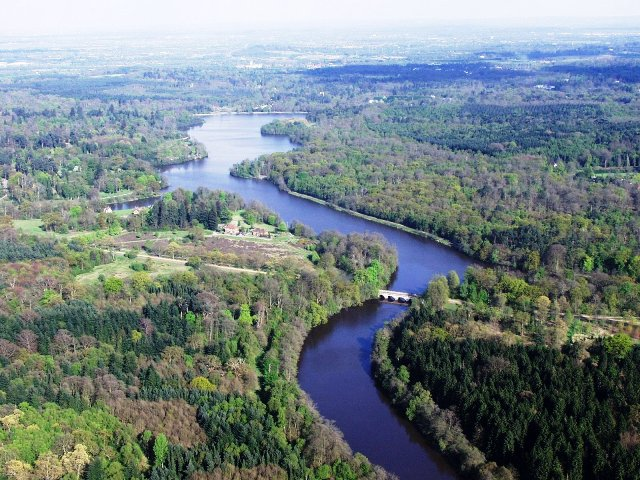

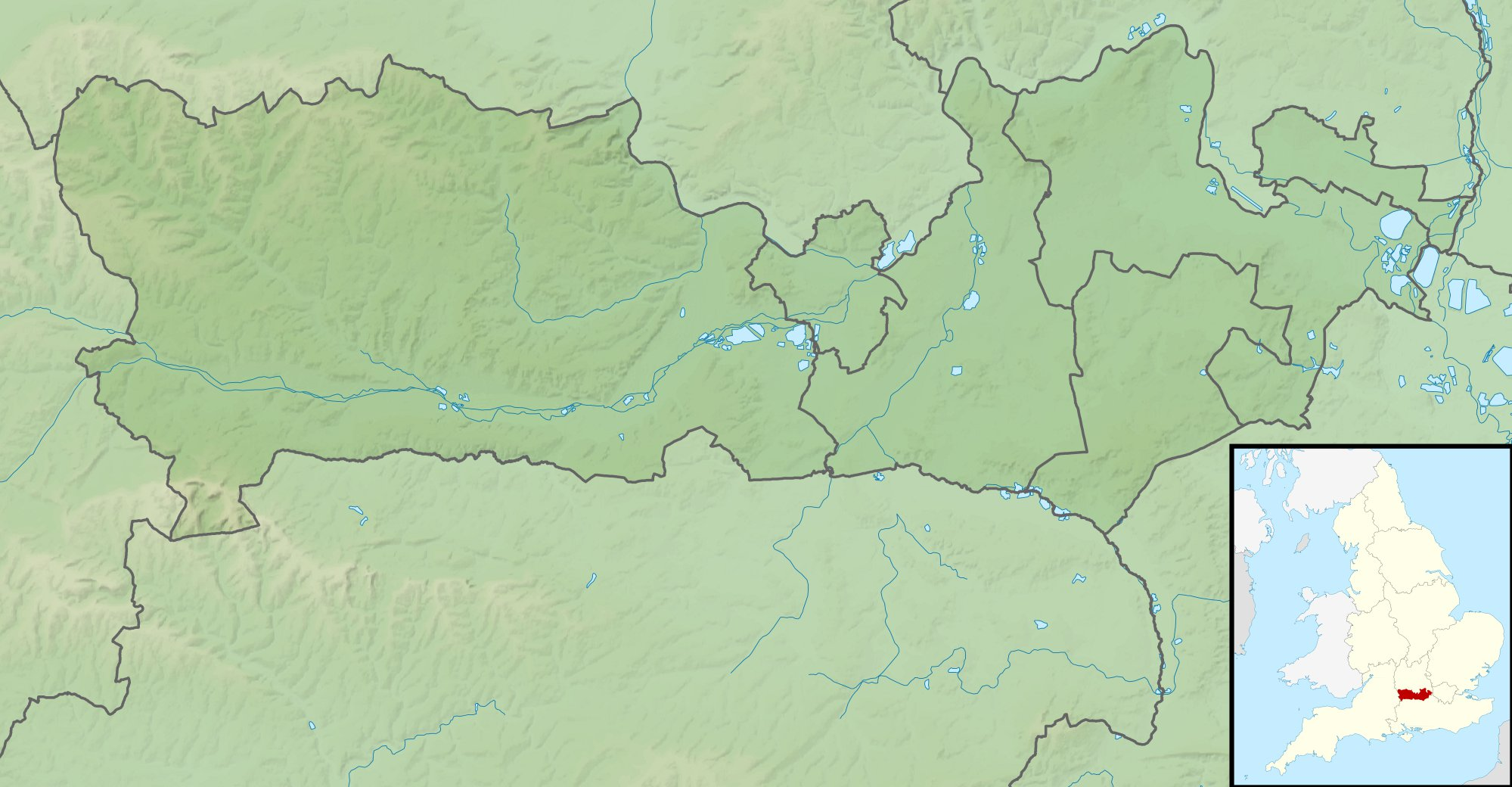
- Location within Berkshire
- Location: Berkshire
- Coordinates: 51°24′40″N 0°36′10″W
- Type: artificial lake
- Primary inflows: River Bourne
- Primary outflows: River Bourne
- Basin countries: United Kingdom
- Settlements: Virginia Water

Virginia Water lies on the southern edge of Windsor Great Park, in the borough of Runnymede in Surrey and the civil parishes of Old Windsor and Sunningdale in Berkshire, in England. It is a man-made lake taking its name from a natural body of water of the same name. There is a village of Virginia Water which stretches out to the east of the lake. The grounds of the lake, nearby Fort Belvedere, and the Clockcase (a further belvedere dating from c. 1750) are all Grade I listed on the Register of Historic Parks and Gardens.

The River Bourne supplies water for the lake, it exits the lake at the eastern end after the cascading waterfall. The circuit around the lake is about 4.5 miles (7.2 km), about half of which is paved.

== History ==
Virginia Water lake was originally little more than a stream, which existed from at least the 17th century and may well be named after Elizabeth I, the Virgin Queen, although this is not certain. The lake itself was begun in 1746 by William, Duke of Cumberland who was then Ranger of the Park. His own regiment, the 23rd Regiment of Foot, undertook the construction. In the 1780s the lake (which had been damaged by flooding) was significantly expanded; for a time it was said to be 'the largest sheet of artificial water in the kingdom'.

=== Manor Lodge ===
In earlier centuries, the principal feature of the surrounding landscape was a moated manor house, built in 1244-46 by Henry III to serve as a royal hunting lodge. It stood to the north of Virginia Brook and its parkland formed the nucleus of what became Windsor Great Park. The manor included a chapel, in which a collegiate chantry was established by Edward II. Having been renovated by Richard II in the 1390s, the complex was known as 'the Manor in Windsor Park' by 1406; by this time it included three chapels, the largest being 70 feet (21 m) long.

The building remained in use well into the 15th century and it appears on Norden's map of 1607, but no trace is visible today. The quadrangular moat, however, has partially survived: while the south and east sections were destroyed by (and incorporated in) the creation of the lake, the north and west arms remain, forming part of a scheduled monument.

=== Lake and Great Bridge ===
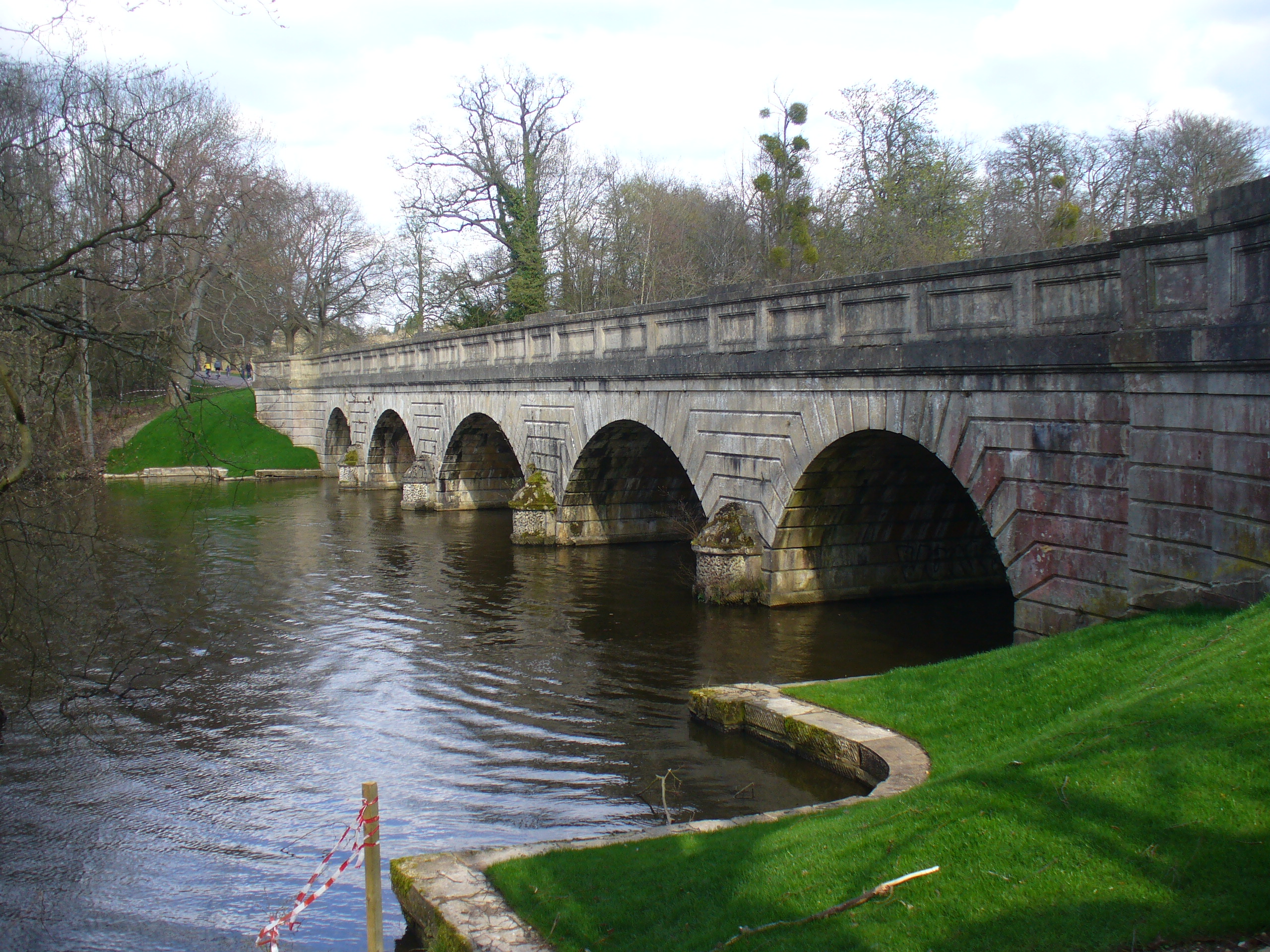
Five Arch Bridge, Virginia Water

Virginia Water was created in 1753 by damming Virginia Brook. The procedure was overseen by Henry Flitcroft, who had been employed for this purpose by Prince William, Duke of Cumberland, in 1749.

The north-south road through the Great Park had crossed Virginia Brook close to the site of the old medieval manor, but when the lake was formed a new 'Great Bridge' was built to the west: the single-arch bridge was designed by Flitcroft and constructed out of wood, in 1753. The original lake was much smaller than the current form; in 1768, the dam which maintained the water level was destroyed in a great flood. The Great Bridge was damaged at the same time, but not swept away.

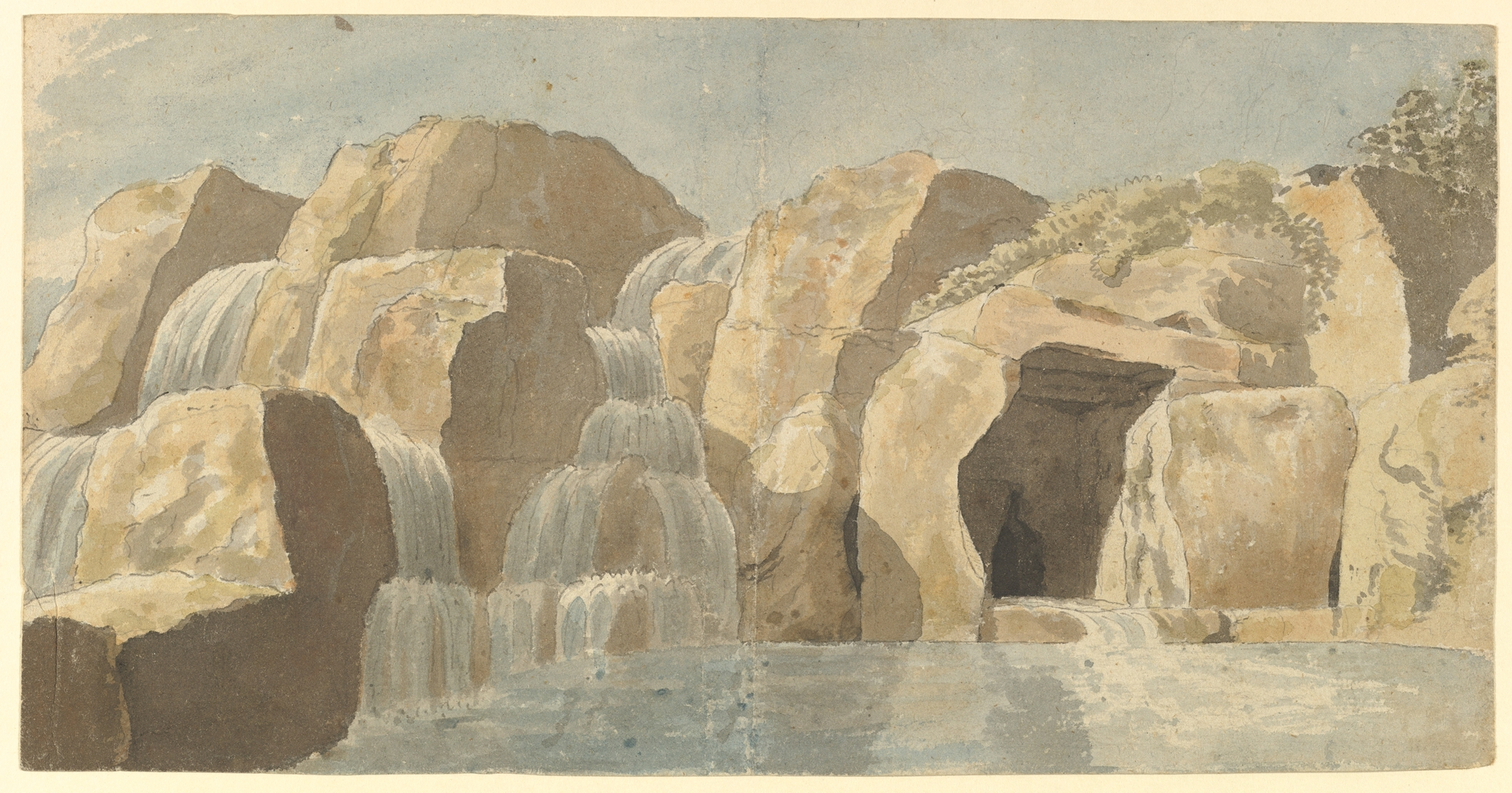
Thomas Sandby's original design for the cascade, c.1780

In 1780 Thomas Sandby began construction of a much larger lake, with a new dam built some 250 metres (820 ft) to the east. He went on to build an artificial waterfall at the southern end of the dam, and added Meadow Pond and Obelisk Pond to the Water. He also designed a new five-arch stone bridge to replace Flitcroft's wooden bridge: his 'Great Stone Bridge' (also referred to as the 'New Bridge') was completed in 1789. By 1817, however, it had fallen into a poor state of repair; it was subsequently replaced, in 1826, by a new five-arch bridge, designed by Jeffry Wyatville, which remains in place today.

During World War II, the lake was drained, as its obvious shape provided enemy guidance at night to Windsor and other important military targets in the area.

=== Lakeside features ===
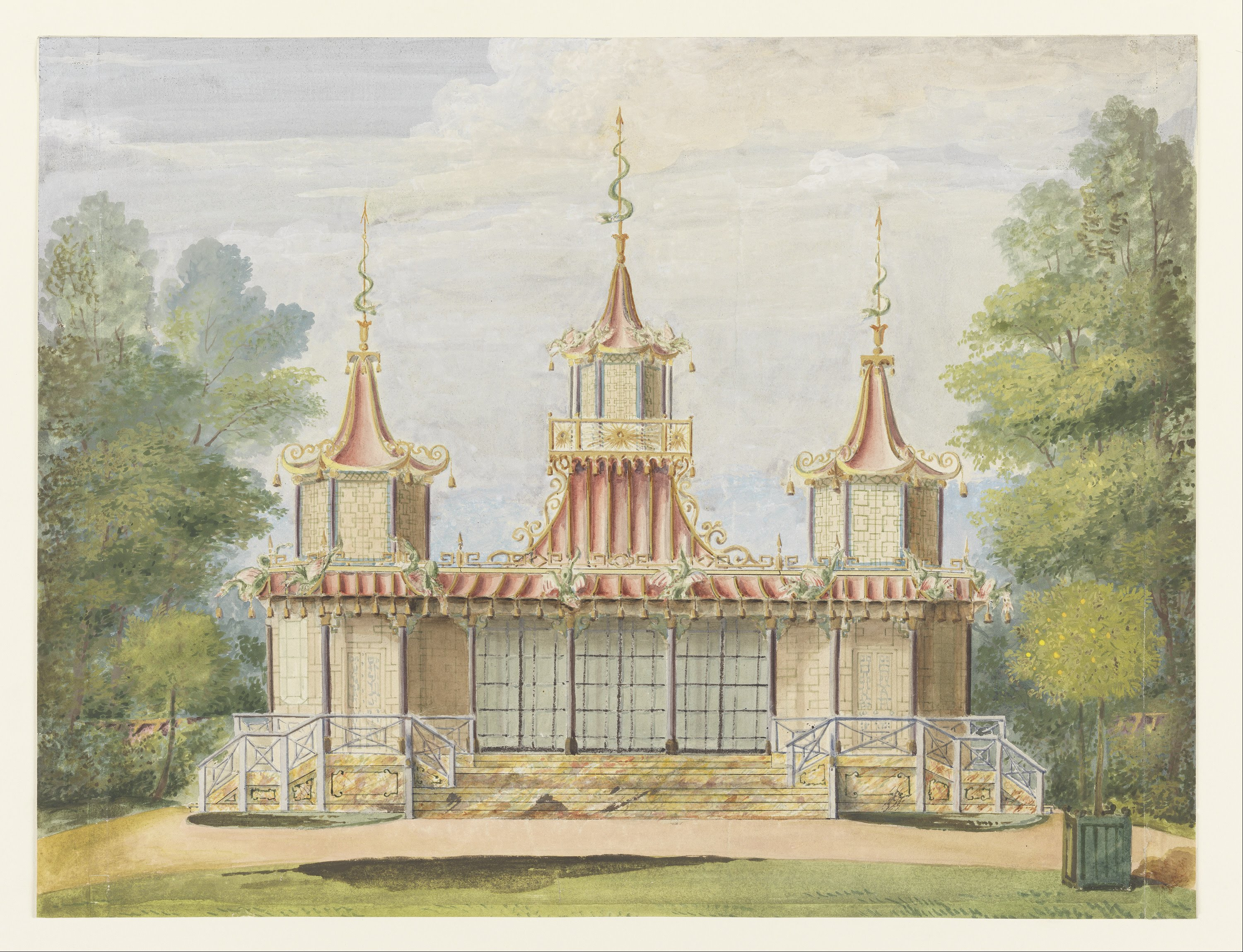
The Fishing Temple, Virginia Water (watercolour by Frederick Crace, c. 1825).

In 1825 Jeffry Wyatville (who had been working on the nearby Royal Lodge for King George IV) was commissioned to design and build a 'Fishing Temple' on the site of the old Manor Lodge, to enable the king and his guests to indulge in angling at the lake. Two years later, Frederick Crace expanded the building and embellished it with oriental decoration. In front of the Temple was a flower garden, complete with an aviary 'and a fountain stocked with gold and silver fish'; to the rear was a gallery, which extended the full width of the building, overlooking the lake. The Fishing Temple was rebuilt by Anthony Salvin in the 1860s, in the style of a Swiss chalet, and continued to be used for royal parties and other events into the 20th century; it was demolished in 1936.

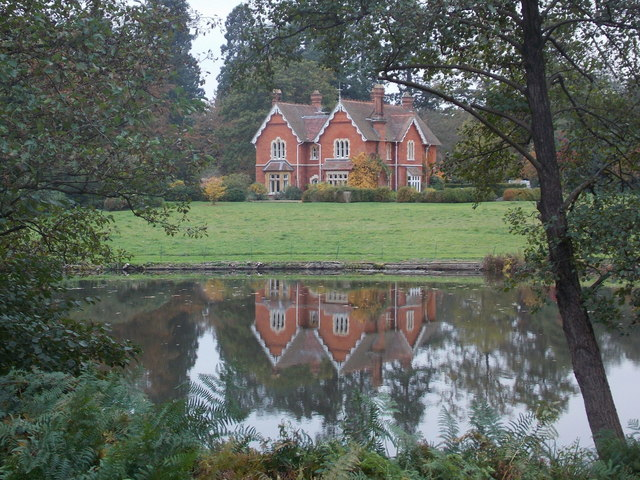
Virginia Water Cottage in 2016

Wyatville designed and built a number of structures on or around the lake in the 1820s, including a new royal boat house, several lodges and bridges, and a 'hermitage' (located on a hill overhanging the water and 'lighted by latticed windows containing some curious specimens of stained glass'). Close to the Fishing Temple, in 1826, he built a cottage for John Whiting, Page of the Backstairs to George IV and the king's chief rower on Virginia Water. In 1834 Mrs Ann Whiting was appointed 'Keeper of His Majesty's Fishing Temple and Cottage at Virginia'. In 1861, David Welch (the lake's boat keeper) was appointed Keeper of the Cottage and duly took possession; he demolished and rebuilt the cottage in 1877, remaining in residence there until 1912. His successors as keeper (latterly termed 'Keeper of Virginia Water') continued to occupy the cottage up until 1936 (when, the Fishing Temple having been demolished, the office of Keeper was discontinued). Virginia Water Cottage then became a grace and favour residence; Angela Lascelles lived there after 1978.

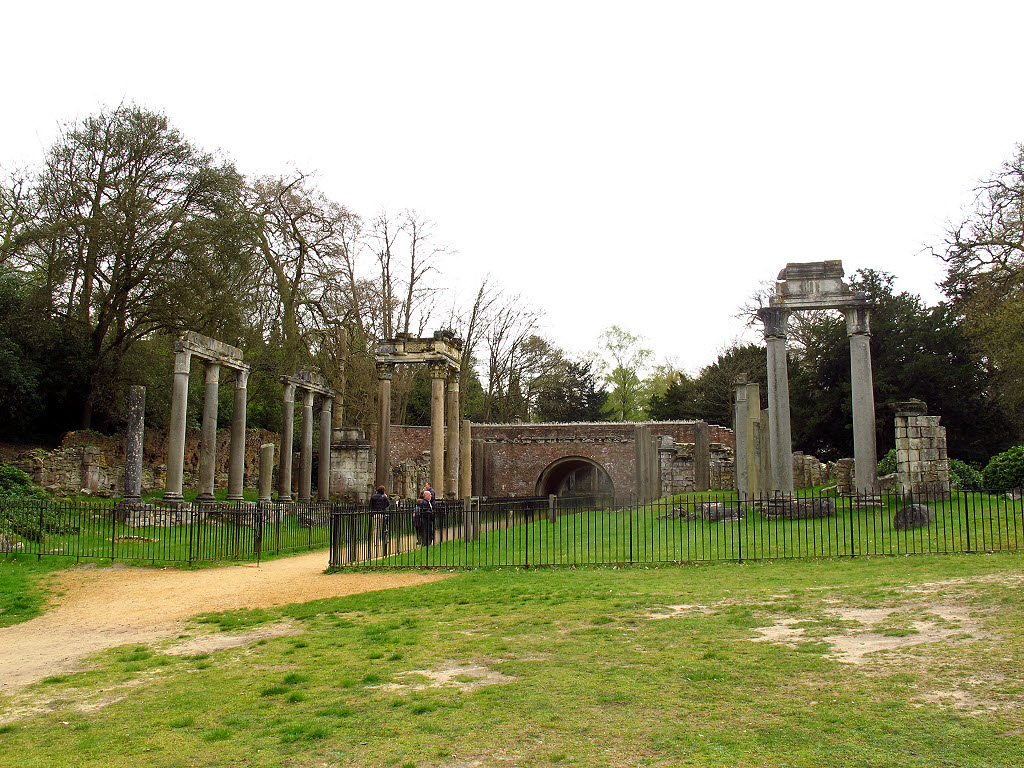
Ruins of Leptis Magna by Virginia Water

On the south side of the lake is a collection of ornamental Roman ruins, a gift from the Pasha of Tripoli to the Prince Regent, which were transported from the site of Leptis Magna (modern-day Al-Khums) in 1816 and installed by Sir Jeffry Wyatville at Virginia Water in 1826. In 2022, the Libyan government questioned the legality of the ruins' acquisition and asked for them to be returned.

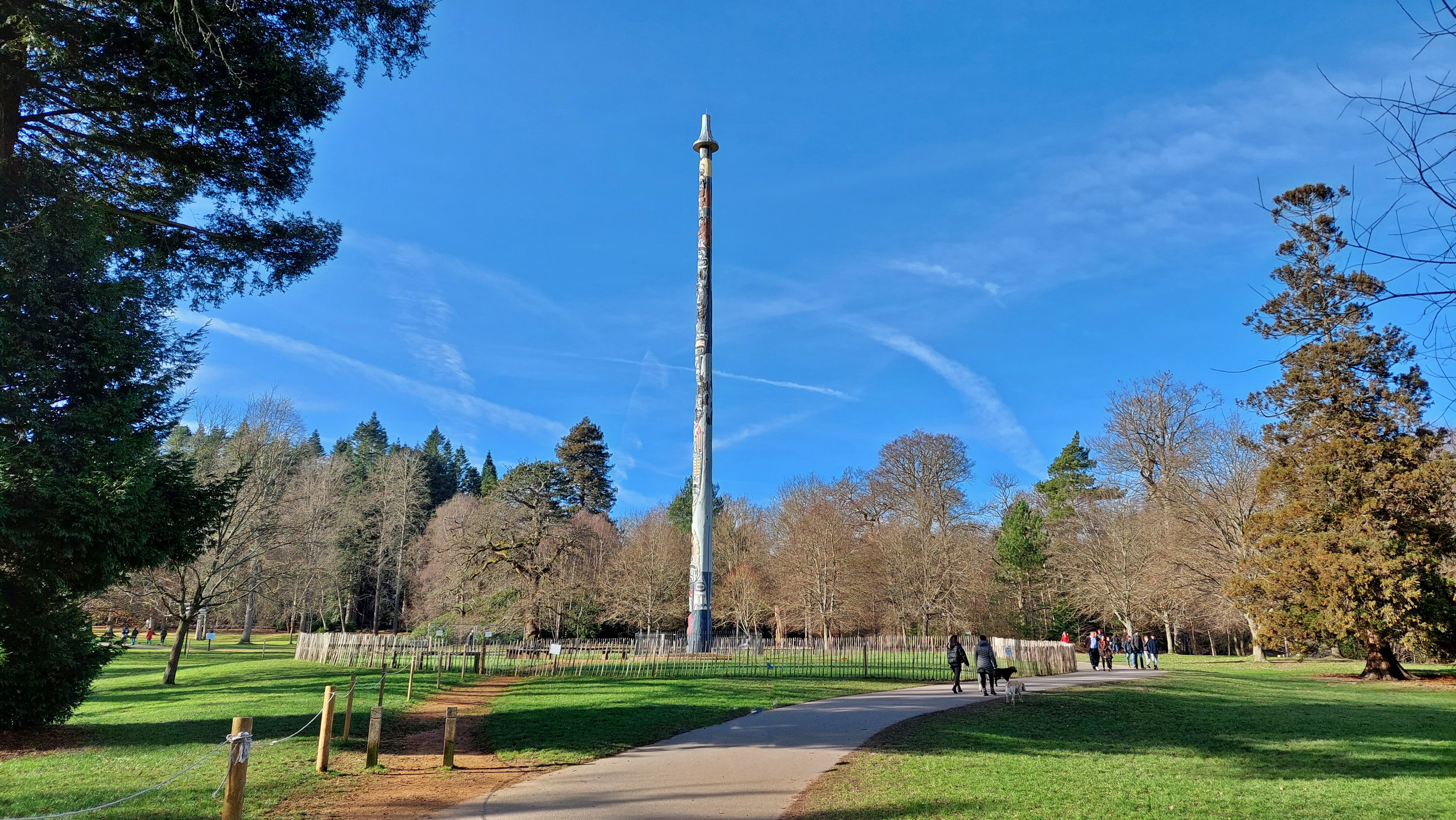
The Totem Pole

Other lakeside features included a 30-metre (100 ft) Canadian totem pole, carved by Mungo Martin, Henry Hunt, and Tony Hunt Sr., commemorating the centenary of British Columbia and gifted to Queen Elizabeth II in 1958. It stood in the park until it was taken down in 2024 at "the end of its natural lifespan", at which point it was left in situ on the ground to decay naturally, in line with Kwakwakaʼwakw First Nation tradition.

The Virginia Water Visitor Centre opened in 2013, designed by Stanton Williams. It was nominated for the 2015 Royal Institute of British Architects South East Awards.

=== Royal Adelaide ===
In 1834, a miniature sailing frigate, the Royal Adelaide, was constructed at Sheerness for King William IV, was dismantled and transported overland to Virginia Water where it was reassembled and launched for sail training of the royal princes. It was fully rigged, was 50 feet (15 m) long and 15 feet (4.6 m) in beam, displacing 50 tons burden, and was armed with 22 working miniature cannons. It was broken up in 1877, the guns were donated to the Royal Yacht Squadron at Cowes Castle.

== In popular culture ==
The lake has been used for lakeside scenes for the Harry Potter films. The Scottish alternative was deemed unsuitable due to the number of midges. The lake was also used for scenes in the 2014 film Into the Woods. It was also used as the scene for the drone strike attack scenes in the 2019 action thriller movie Angel Has Fallen. The park features in a pivotal chapter of Barbara Pym's 1978 novel The Sweet Dove Died.

== Gallery ==
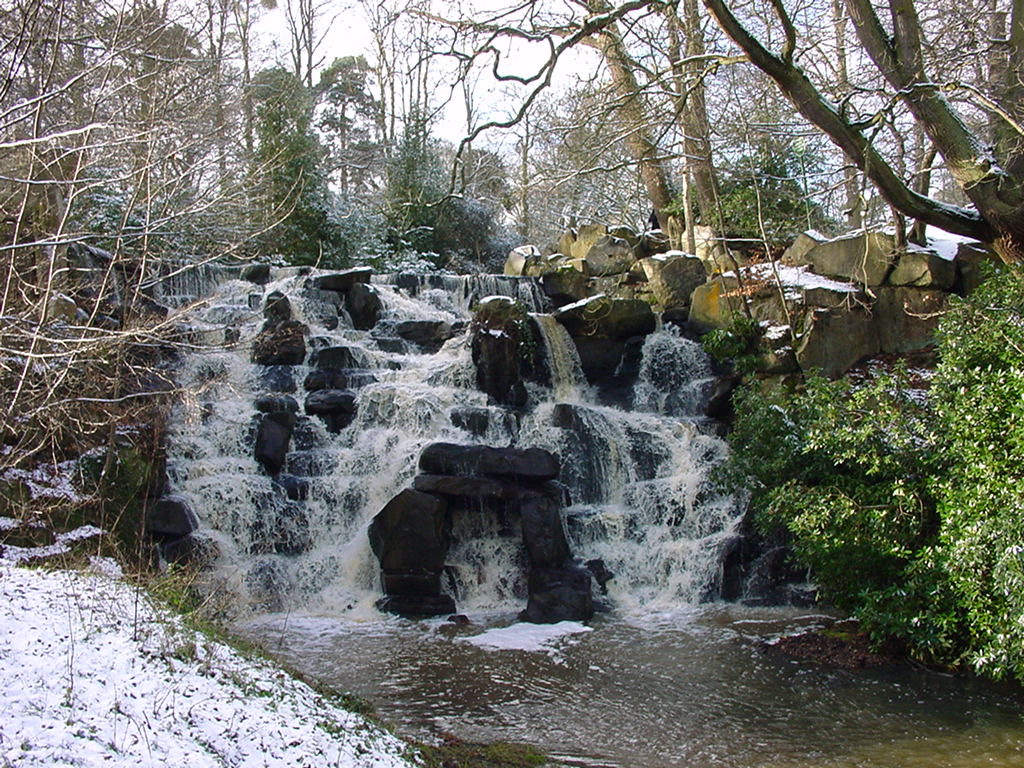
Waterfall at eastern end of lake

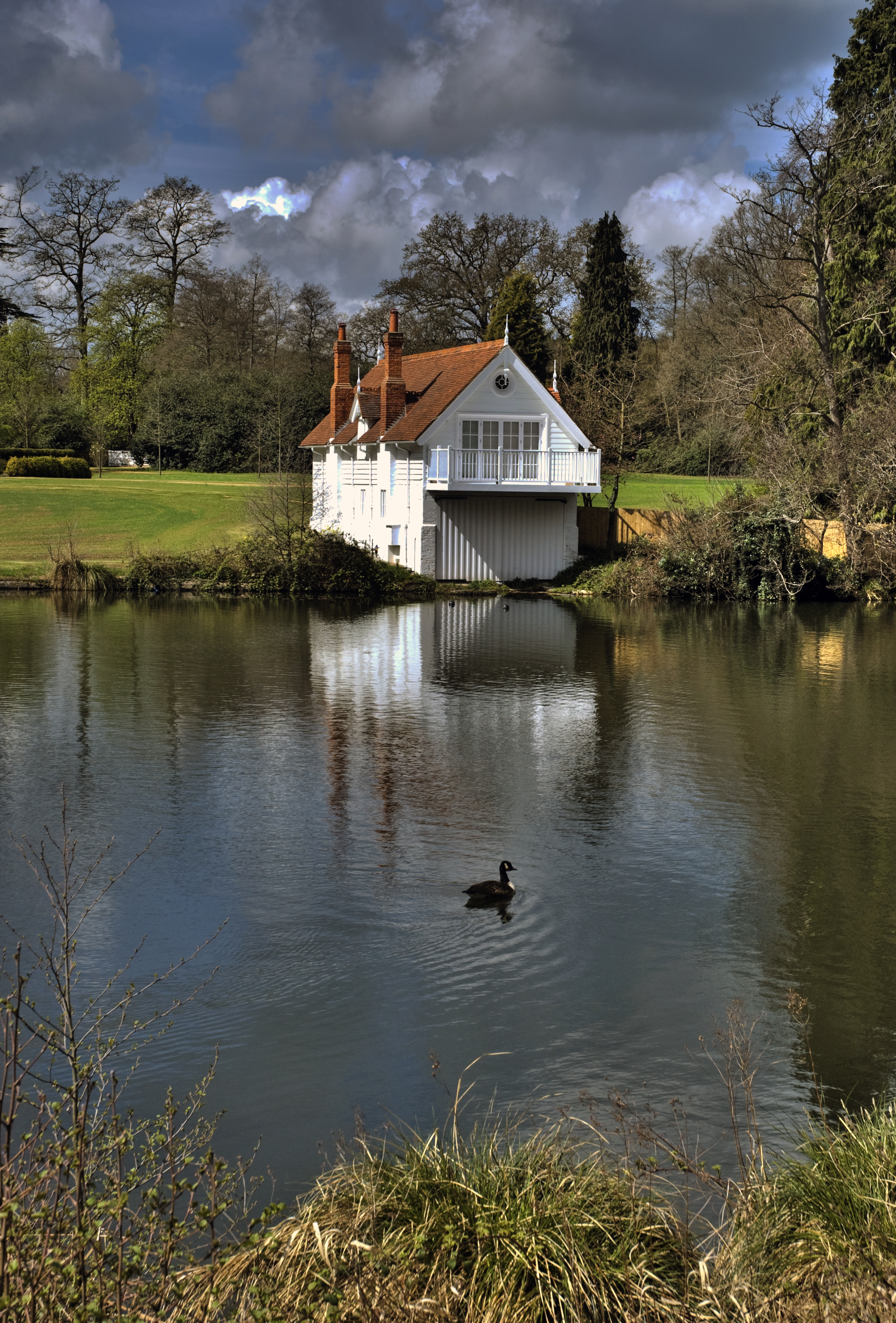
Boathouse, Virginia Water, 2012

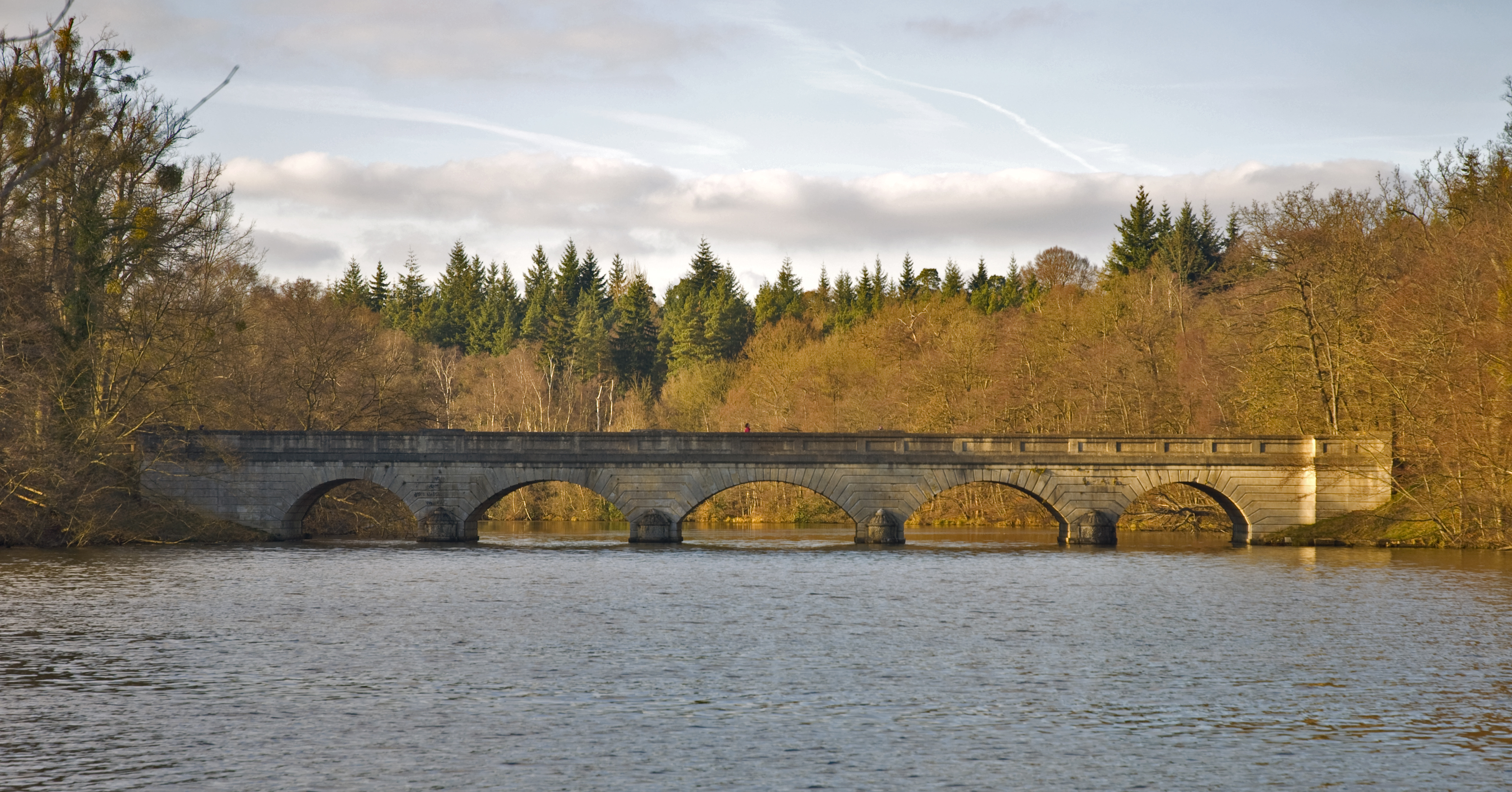
Bridge across Virginia Water

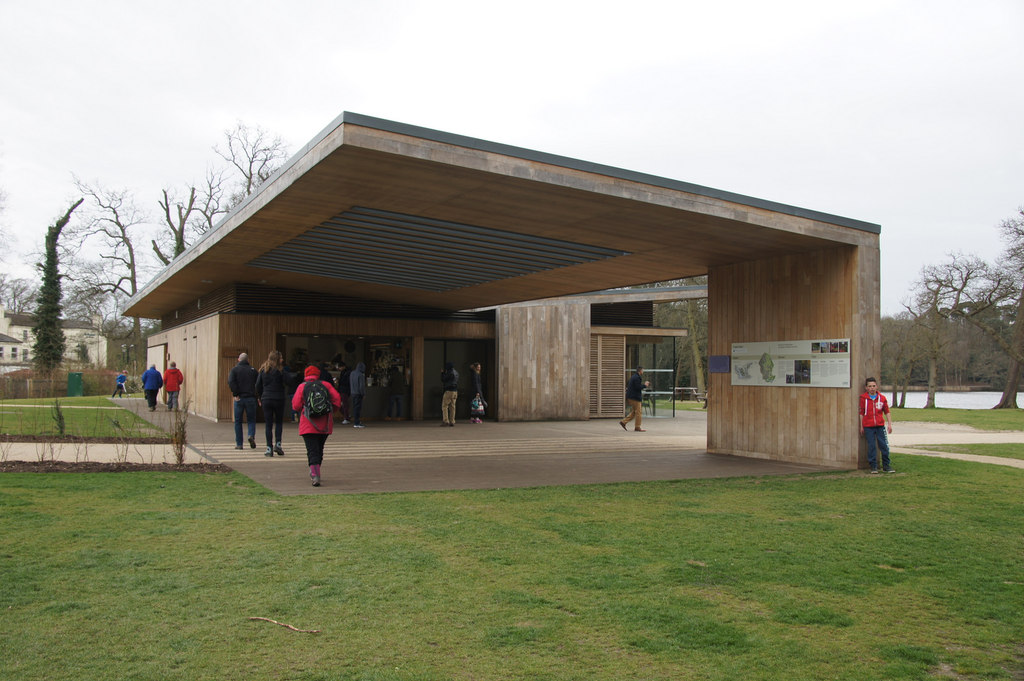
Visitor Centre at Virginia Water, 2015

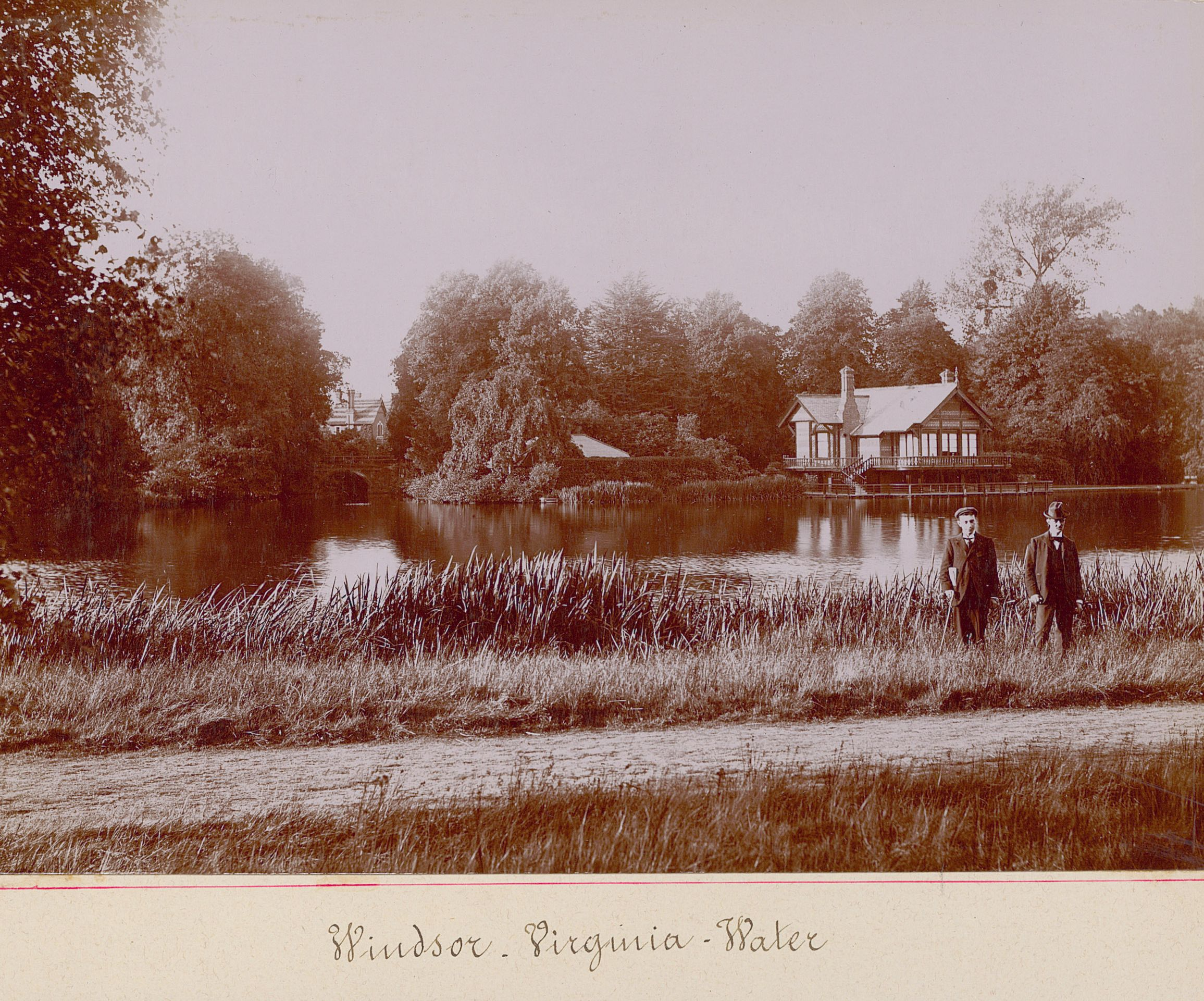
The rebuilt Fishing Temple, c.1900

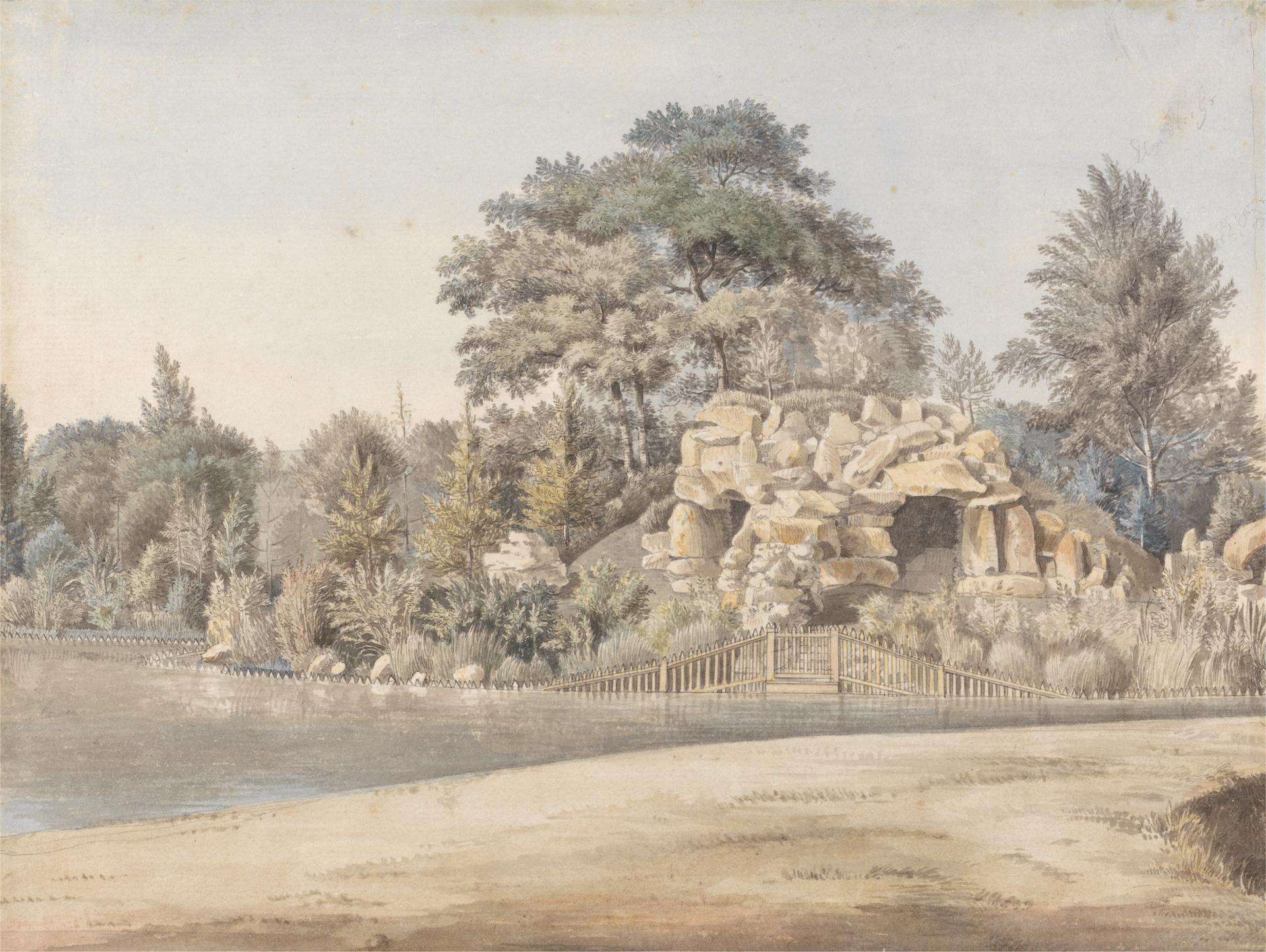
The Grotto, Virginia Water (watercolour by Thomas Sandby, c.1754)

The Cascade, Virginia Water, United Kingdom, 2021
