= River Bourne, Chertsey =

River in Berkshire and Surrey, England

Coordinates: 51.3806°N 0.4749°W

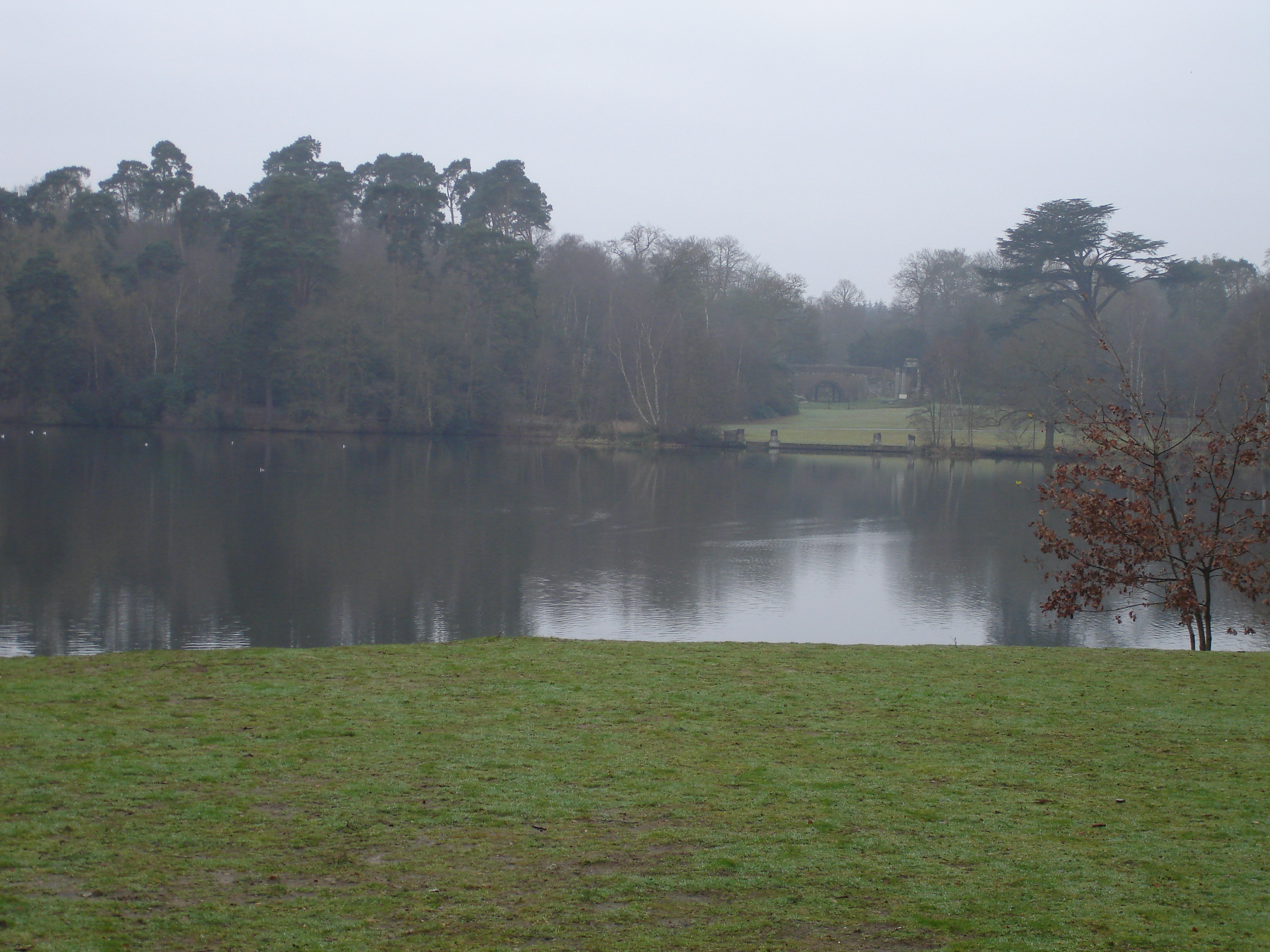
Virginia Water Lake near the source of the River Bourne

The River Bourne or the Chertsey Bourne is a river in Berkshire and Surrey; it runs from sources in Windsor Great Park and Swinley Forest through to the River Thames.

== Course ==
=== Upstream of Virginia Water (village) ===
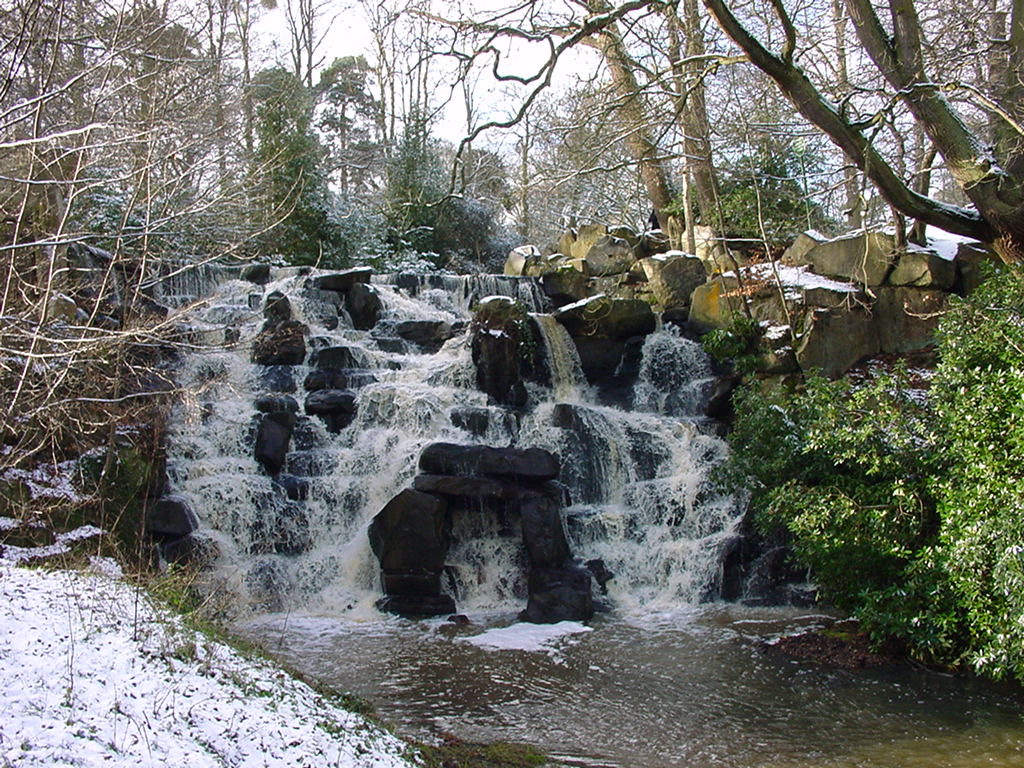
Waterfall at eastern end of Virginia Water Lake where the River Bourne exits the lake

After gathering a number of streams flowing from north, south and west into Virginia Water Lake the stream coalesces into one large stream for the rest of its course. The lake is largely created by a steep boulder cascade with eastern embankments close to car parks at the side of Windsor Great Park, on the A30 London Road. The Chertsey Bourne flows through the north of the landscaped Wentworth Estate, a residential 'golfside' mansions estate dating to periods since the 1920s, where a further weir creates the much smaller Wentworth Pond which is by the Wentworth Club clubhouse. Before Wellington Bridge across the course, the Wentworth Brook rising in Sunningdale Golf Club joins. After this, the brook is less exposed to view forming a wide, wooded divide in Virginia Water lined with a walk.

The land either side of the River Bourne below the Lake and west of Virginia Water railway station is owned by Runnymede Borough Council as trustees of the Cabrera Trust, named after Spanish noble Ramòn Cabrera who owned and developed a wide landscape at Wentworth.

Early Bridges

The bridge nearest the source is an old girder bridge. It is a curiosity and its origin is obscure. Old maps show the valley as wet pastureland, probably suitable for cattle, so a strong bridge would have been necessary.

Near the second bridge downstream from the source, there is a colony of mandarin ducks. They were introduced to the River Bourne in 1929–30. The colony is probably the largest in the United Kingdom and is of international significance due to the rapid decline of mandarin ducks in its native Asia.

=== Downstream of Virginia Water (village) ===
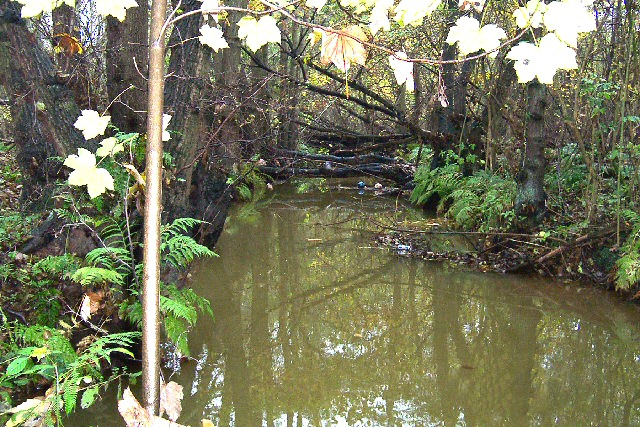
The Bourne

At Thorpe Green, a green, road and line of houses beneath Virginia Water station, the river forms the southern border of Thorpe and the northern border of Lyne. During its passage, the northern bank of the Bourne receives more sun than the south. This affects the microclimate as there are seasonal frost pockets and areas of high humidity which impacts the vegetation. The Bourne passes into Chertsey and adjoins Chertsey Meads before entering the grounds of St George's College, formerly Woburn Park, close to the Thames in Addlestone. Here, now slow-flowing, as a small river, it joins with the Addlestone branch. Combined, these briefly create a back-gardens feature with a deep, vertical metal-lined channel. This joins the River Thames within 200 m (660 ft) below its southernmost weir, in one of its channels bypassing Shepperton Lock beside Hamm Court, Addlestone close to the border with Weybridge which is marked by the River Wey that joins a further 300 metres (980 ft) downstream of this.

The longest tract of public land is upstream at and by Virginia Water Lake, particularly beyond that when Windsor Great Park is open, in this section it include walks in two parks in Chertsey (Note: Gogmore Farm Park (a farm was there, now central parks and allotments) and The Bourne Park/Chertsey Meads). The river creates access for small motorboats and canoes for the c. 20 properties in its lowest reach at Hamm Court. Only the lower section below a weir is canalised, the remainder is natural bank, forming a minor habitat for the European water vole. The middle course of the Bourne passes under the M3 motorway three times in a short space. In the midst of which the M25 also crosses it.

== Surrounding Soil, Elevations and Rainfall ==
It is a small river, once past Virginia Water lake about 3–5 m wide and flows over land which is geologically between the Bagshot and London Formations, where sands and gravel overlie chalk with limited clay, described as "loamy soils with naturally high groundwater". Soils are generally around the upper reaches acid heath followed in the lower reaches by alluvium (flood plain deposits).

Below Thorpe the Bourne is one of several Thames tributaries and the wider plain of surrounding land is lower lying. Elevations range as follows:

Elevation of Bourne at centre	Settlement passed	Elevation of centre of settlement
44m	Sunningdale	53m
27m	Wentworth	36-50m
25m	Virginia Water	29-39m
14m	Thorpe	14.4m-15.2m
11.6m	Chertsey	12.2m-14m
10.8m	Hamm Court, Addlestone	11.4m

Local annual rainfall is about 635 mm.

== Flood Risk ==
In January 2003, the Bourne burst its banks in Chertsey. Approximately 130 properties were flooded and public buildings, including St Anne's County Primary School, were cut off by floodwater. Local concerns that this flood was exacerbated by the building of the Jubilee River are false as this scheme protects the Windsor and Maidenhead area, however, the Environment Agency is introducing plans for a new flood alleviation scheme which will create additional capacity to help other affected reaches of the Thames, at Staines upon Thames and Chertsey.

== Fishing ==
The river is fished. Among the fish found in the Bourne, the chub can reach 2 kg, with barbel reported to touch 3 kg, bream to 1 kg and even carp to 5 kg, along with roach, dace, perch, and pike. The stretch of water running past and through Chertsey Meads is particularly full of fish when the River Thames is in spate due to heavy rainfall because the fish swim up the Bourne to escape the turbulence.

== See also ==
- Tributaries of the River Thames
- List of rivers of England

== Notes and references ==
Notes

Next confluence upstream	River Thames	Next confluence downstream
Abbey River (south)	River Bourne, Chertsey with River Bourne, Addlestone	Wey and Godalming Navigations (south)
