= Wadi Lebda Dam =

Dam in Khoms, Libya

- Location within Libya
- Official name: alkoms
- Country: Libya
- Location: Khoms
- Coordinates: 32°36′00″N 14°16′55″E
- Status: Operational
- Opening date: 1982

Dam and spillways
- Impounds: Wadi Lebda
- Height: 33 m (108 ft)

Reservoir
- Total capacity: 5,200,000 m^{3} (4,216 acre⋅ft)
- Surface area: 700 m^{2} (7,535 ft^{2})

The Wadi Lebda Dam is an embankment dam located on Wadi Lebda, 5 km (3 mi) south of Khoms in the Murqub District, Libya. Completed in 1982, the primary purpose of the dam is water supply for irrigation and flood control.
