= Hampshire Bowl (rugby union) =

Annual rugby union knock-out club competition

- Sport: Rugby Union
- Instituted: 1999; 27 years ago
- Country: England
- Holders: Eastleigh (3rd title) (2018–19)
- Most titles: Eastleigh, Sandown & Shanklin (3 titles)
- Website: Hampshire RFU

The Hampshire Bowl is an annual rugby union knock-out club competition organised by the Hampshire Rugby Football Union. It was first introduced during the 1999–99 season, with the inaugural winners being Romsey. It is the second important rugby union cup competition in Hampshire, behind the Hampshire Cup but ahead of the Hampshire Plate. When it was introduced in 1999 the Bowl initially replaced the Plate competition, which was itself re-instated several years later for the 2003–04 season.

The Hampshire Bowl is currently open to club sides based in Hampshire, the Isle of Wight and the Channel Islands, who play between tier 8 (London 3 South West) and tier 9 (Hampshire Premier) of the English rugby union league system, although sometimes teams from outside the league structure are invited to take part. The format is a knockout cup with a preliminary round, quarter-finals, semi-finals and a final to be held at the home ground of one of the finalists between March–May.

== Hampshire Bowl winners ==
Hampshire Bowl Finals
Season	Winner	Score	Runners–up	Venue
1999-00	Romsey	33–9	Millbrook	Lordshill Recreational Ground, Southampton, Hampshire
2000–01	Sandown & Shanklin	38–8	Fordingbridge	The Fairway Ground, Sandown, Isle of Wight
2001–02	Guernsey	27–10	Millbrook	Lordshill Recreational Ground, Southampton, Hampshire
2002–03	Les Quennevais	41–29	New Milton & District	Ashley Sports Ground, New Milton, Hampshire
2003–04	Tottonians	25–17	Guernsey	Water Lane, Totton and Eling, Hampshire
2004–05	Alton	16–8	Petersfield	Anstey Park, Alton, Hampshire
2005–06	Petersfield	18–17	U.S. Portsmouth	
2006–07	Petersfield	27–13	Ellingham & Ringwood	
2007–08	Ellingham & Ringwood	28–20	Petersfield	Picket Post, Ringwood, Hampshire
2008–09	Trojans	21–0	Sandown & Shanklin	The Fairway Ground, Sandown, Isle of Wight
2009–10	Gosport & Fareham	21–13	Sandown & Shanklin	Gosport Park, Gosport, Hampshire
2010–11	Sandown & Shanklin	59–7	Petersfield	Penn's Place, Petersfield, Hampshire
2011–12	Sandown & Shanklin	50–5	Fordingbridge	The Fairway Ground, Sandown, Isle of Wight
2012–13	No competition			
2013–14	Eastleigh	44–6	Ellingham & Ringwood	Raymond Brown Memorial Ground, Ringwood, Hampshire
2014–15	Andover	28–10	Southampton University Medics	Bishopstoke Road, Eastleigh, Hampshire
2015–16	Eastleigh	20–8	Trojans	Bishopstoke Road, Eastleigh, Hampshire
2016–17	Trojans	14–13	Eastleigh	Stoneham Lane, Eastleigh, Hampshire
2017–18	Portsmouth	29–22	Trojans	The Rugby Camp, Portsmouth, Hampshire
2018–19	Eastleigh	34–24	Portsmouth	The Rugby Camp, Portsmouth, Hampshire
2019–20	Winchester		Andover	

== Number of wins ==
- Eastleigh (3)
- Sandown & Shanklin (3)
- Petersfield (2)
- Trojans (2)
- Alton (1)
- Andover (1)
- Ellingham & Ringwood (1)
- Gosport & Fareham (1)
- Guernsey (1)
- Les Quennevais (1)
- Portsmouth (1)
- Romsey (1)
- Tottonians (1)

== See also ==
- Hampshire RFU
- Hampshire Cup
- Hampshire Plate
- English rugby union system
- Rugby union in England
