= Hampshire Cup (rugby union) =

Rugby union competition

- Sport: Rugby Union
- Instituted: 1970; 56 years ago
- Number of teams: 7
- Country: England
- Holders: Havant (19th title) (2017–18)
- Most titles: Havant (19 titles)
- Website: Hampshire RFU

The Hampshire Cup is an annual rugby union knock-out club competition organised by the Hampshire Rugby Football Union. It was first introduced during the 1970–71 season, with the inaugural winners being U.S. Portsmouth. It is the most important rugby union cup competition in Hampshire, ahead of the Hampshire Bowl and Hampshire Plate.

The Hampshire Cup is currently open to club sides based in Hampshire, the Isle of Wight or the Channel Islands, who play between tier 6 (London 1 South) and tier 7 (London 2 South West) of the English rugby union league system. The format is a knockout cup with a preliminary round, semi-finals and a final to be held at the home ground of one of the finalists between March–May.

== Hampshire Cup winners ==
Hampshire Cup Finals
| Season | Winner | Score | Runners–up | Venue |
| 1970–71 | U.S. Portsmouth | 17–11 | Havant | |
| 1971–72 | U.S. Portsmouth | 4–0 | Bournemouth | |
| 1972–73 | Aldershot Services | 9–6 | Havant | Burnaby Road, Portsmouth, Hampshire |
| 1973–74 | Bournemouth | 16–3 (Note: The 1973–74 Hampshire Cup final was originally to be held at Down Grange in Basingstoke in March 1974 but due to snow the game was postponed to 21 April 2005 and was switched to Trojan's home ground in Eastleigh.) | Trojans | Stoneham Lane, Eastleigh |
| 1974–75 | Havant | 12–6 | Bournemouth | |
| 1975–76 | Winchester | 7–0 | Jersey | |
| 1976–77 | U.S. Portsmouth | 13–3 | Trojans | Stoneham Lane, Eastleigh, Hampshire |
| 1977–78 | Havant | 19–10 | Basingstoke | |
| 1978–79 | Havant | 23–9 | Jersey | |
| 1979–80 | Havant | 14–7 | Trojans | Stoneham Lane, Eastleigh, Hampshire |
| 1980–81 | U.S. Portsmouth | 21–6 | Trojans | Burnaby Road, Portsmouth, Hampshire |
| 1981–82 | U.S. Portsmouth | 13–11 | Basingstoke | |
| 1982–83 | U.S. Portsmouth | 20–4 | Eastleigh | |
| 1983–84 | Havant | 30–0 | Southampton | |
| 1984–85 | Havant | 10–3 | Eastleigh | |
| 1985–86 | Havant | 10–0 | U.S. Portsmouth | |
| 1986–87 | Havant | 31–0 | Eastleigh | |
| 1987–88 | Havant | 14–12 | Basingstoke | |
| 1988–89 | Havant | 15–13 | Basingstoke | |
| 1989–90 | Basingstoke | 24–10 | Portsmouth | |
| 1990–91 | Havant | 12–6 | Alton | |
| 1991–92 | Basingstoke | 16–6 | Havant | |
| 1992–93 | Basingstoke | 37–3 | Alton | |
| 1993–94 | Basingstoke | 25–11 | Alton | |
| 1994–95 | Basingstoke | 16–16 | Portsmouth | |
| 1995–96 | Havant | 61–12 | Gosport & Fareham | |
| 1996–97 | Basingstoke | 29–18 | Winchester | |
| 1997–98 | Winchester | 18–0 | Jersey | |
| 1998–99 | Winchester | 11–7 | Havant | |
| 1999-00 | Basingstoke | 24–10 | Alton | Down Grange, Basingstoke, Hampshire |
| 2000–01 | Basingstoke | 19–8 | Havant | Hook's Lane, Bedhampton, Hampshire |
| 2001–02 | Basingstoke | 16–15 | Havant | Hook's Lane, Bedhampton, Hampshire |
| 2002–03 | Basingstoke | 74–10 | Jersey | Down Grange, Basingstoke, Hampshire |
| 2003–04 | Andover | 9–5 | Basingstoke | Goodship Ground, Andover, Hampshire |
| 2004–05 | Havant | 55–7 | Basingstoke | Down Grange, Basingstoke, Hampshire |
| 2005–06 | Havant | 40–31 | Basingstoke | Down Grange, Basingstoke |
| 2006–07 | Havant | 50–13 | Andover | Hook's Lane, Bedhampton, Hampshire |
| 2007–08 | Havant | 25–15 | Basingstoke | Hook's Lane, Bedhampton, Hampshire |
| 2008–09 | Basingstoke | 17–3 | Havant | Hook's Lane, Bedhampton, Hampshire |
| 2009–10 | Basingstoke | 39–16 | Portsmouth | Down Grange, Basingstoke, Hampshire |
| 2010–11 | Gosport & Fareham | 23–19 | Basingstoke | Down Grange, Basingstoke, Hampshire |
| 2011–12 | Basingstoke | 16–10 | Gosport & Fareham | Down Grange, Basingstoke, Hampshire |
| 2012–13 | Portsmouth | 16–6 | Gosport & Fareham | Rugby Camp, Portsmouth, Hampshire |
| 2013–14 | Basingstoke | 13–11 (aet) | Havant | Down Grange, Basingstoke, Hampshire |
| 2014–15 | Havant | 15–13 | Gosport & Fareham | Gosport Park, Gosport, Hampshire |
| 2015–16 | No competition | | | |
| 2016–17 | Havant | 37–36 | Winchester | North Walls Park, Winchester, Hampshire |
| 2017–18 | Havant | 25–0 | Bournemouth | Hook's Lane, Bedhampton, Hampshire |
| 2018–19 | | | | |
| 2019–20 | | | | |
| 2020–21 | | | | |
| 2021–22 | | | | |
| 2022–23 | | | | |
| 2023-24 | | | | |
| 2024-25 | | | | |
| 2025-26 | Basingstoke | 42–8 | New Milton | Down Grange, Basingstoke, Hampshire |

== Number of wins ==
- Havant (19)
- Basingstoke (14)
- U.S. Portsmouth (6)
- Winchester (3)
- Aldershot Services (1)
- Andover (1)
- Bournemouth (1)
- Gosport & Fareham (1)
- Portsmouth (1)

== See also ==
- Hampshire RFU
- Hampshire Bowl
- Hampshire Plate
- English rugby union system
- Rugby union in England
