= Alpin Thomson =

Scotland international rugby union & cricket player

Personal information
- Full name: Alpin Erroll Thomson
- Born: 14 May 1893; Perth, Western Australia
- Died: 6 March 1960 (aged 66); Hawridge, Chesham, Buckinghamshire, England
- Batting: Right-handed
- Role: Bowler

Domestic team information
- Years: Team
- 1922–1923: Somerset
- 1922: Royal Navy
- FC debut: 31 May 1922 Somerset v Oxford University
- Last FC: 31 August 1923 Somerset v Hampshire

Career statistics
Competition	First-class
Matches	3
Runs scored	7
Batting average	3.50
100s/50s	0/0
Top score	7*
Balls bowled	361
Wickets	4
Bowling average	47.25
5 wickets in innings	0
10 wickets in match	0
Best bowling	3/90
Catches/stumpings	1/–
- Source: CricketArchive, 31 May 2011

Rugby union career
- Position: Centre
Amateur team(s)
Years	Team	Apps	(Points)
- Royal Navy
–	United Services		
Provincial / State sides
Years	Team	Apps	(Points)
1921	Scotland Possibles		
International career
Years	Team	Apps	(Points)
1921	Scotland	3	(3)

Alpin Erroll Thomson DSC (14 May 1893 – 6 March 1960) played first-class cricket for Somerset County Cricket Club and the Royal Navy Cricket Club in 1922 and 1923. He also played international rugby union for Scotland. He was born in Perth, Western Australia and died at Hawridge, Chesham, Buckinghamshire. In some sources, his second name is spelled "Errol".

== Family and background ==
Thomson's father, also called Alpin Thomson, was a colonial administrator in Western Australia at the time of his birth, being under-secretary for railways in the colony's government. His mother was, in one account, the daughter of the colonial secretary (equivalent to chief minister) of Western Australia from 1877 to 1880, Sir Roger Goldsworthy, and Goldsworthy left Alpin Thomson Sr and his wife with his unfinished house, called Lucknow, at Claremont, when he was posted to St Lucia in 1881. In 1933, Thomson's mother was cited in The Times as one of just nine remaining survivors of the Siege of Lucknow in 1857; if that is accurate, it explains the name of the house, but she is likely on grounds of age to have been Goldsworthy's step-daughter rather than a direct descendant. By the time of the First World War, Thomson's parents had retired to live at Wellington, Somerset.

== Naval career ==
At the age of 13 in 1906, Thomson was sent to the Osborne Naval College on the Isle of Wight. He then moved on to the Britannia Royal Naval College at Dartmouth, Devon, where he won an award for swimming. In 1911, he was appointed as a midshipman to HMS Superb. He was promoted from acting sub-lieutenant to a full sub-lieutenant in 1914 and for the first two years of the First World was second-in-command of HMS Circe, a "minesweeping gunboat". He was then promoted to full lieutenant and given command of a minesweeper, HMS Kempton. In 1917, he was awarded the Distinguished Service Cross "in recognition of (his) gallantry when one of H.M. minesweepers hit a mine": the minesweeper was Kempton, which sank off Dover after hitting a mine on 24 June 1917. He was awarded his medal personally by King George V on a visit to ships at Harwich in February 1918. Thomson went on to command two further minesweepers, HMS Melton and HMS Tring.

Thomson stayed in the Royal Navy at the end of the First World War and retrained as a physical training instructor. He was attached to the 1st Battle Squadron as an instructor, and later served on the aircraft carrier HMS Argus. He was promoted from lieutenant to lieutenant-commander in 1924 and retrained as an "air observer", serving on Argus, and then HMS Furious and HMS Eagle. As a lieutenant-commander, he was "lent" to the Royal Air Force in 1929 for "Observer and Instructional Duties" at RAF Leuchars in Scotland. He stayed in Scotland after this posting as the officer-instructor to the East Scottish division of the Royal Naval Volunteer Reserve from 1932 to 1936. He retired from the Navy in 1936 and retained the rank of Commander in retirement.

== Rugby Union career ==
=== Amateur career ===
Thomson played rugby union for the Royal Navy before the First World War, appearing as a centre three-quarter in a match against Harlequins at New Year 1914.

After the war, The Times carried reports on matches played by both the Royal Navy and by the United Services team in which Thomson featured.

=== Provincial career ===
He was "one of the outstanding players" in the trial match for the Scottish national side in January 1921, playing for the Scotland Possibles side.

=== International career ===
He had 3 international caps for Scotland, all in 1921.

On 12 January 1921 The Times reported his name among those picked to play for Scotland against France as a centre. The match itself was not a success for Thomson: he "was entirely out of form" and "mishandled the ball practically every time it came to him", said the report of the match, a 3–0 win for France.

Thomson retained his place in the Scotland team for the next match against Wales at St Helen's, Swansea and was the subject of comment in The Times: "A. E. Thomson's mishandling of the ball was so atrocious that the Scottish selectors may, perhaps, be pardoned for assuming that his form was too bad to be real. One knows that he does possess the quality of pace."

This match was won by Scotland and Thomson was the scorer of the first try; the report in The Times, which dwelt largely on pitch invasions that once brought the match to a halt and impeded play throughout, praised Thomson's speed, though again it said his handling was "weak".

An ankle injury prevented Thomson playing in the next international match away to Ireland, when Scotland were beaten, but he was recalled for the final international of the season, the Calcutta Cup match against England at Inverleith. It was again not a happy experience: his miss of a pass let in the England wing three-quarter for a try, and the report in The Times said that both Thomson and his Royal Navy colleague Cecil MacKenzie, the other centre three-quarter, were "entirely at sea, both in attack and defence".

Thomson did not play any further international rugby in subsequent seasons, though he continued to play for the United Services club, moving successfully to full back.

== Cricket career ==
Thomson's first-class cricket career was brief. In May 1922, he played a single match for Somerset against Oxford University, batting as a tail-ender, failing to score a run, but taking three second innings wickets. Having earlier played in non-first-class matches for the Royal Navy team, he then turned out in a first-class game against The Army at Lord's, scoring 7 not out and 0 and taking one wicket. That was not quite the end of his first-class cricket career: at the end of the 1923 season, Somerset played Hampshire at the United Services Ground at Portsmouth, and Thomson was drafted into the team: he batted at No 11, was not out 0 in the first innings and "absent hurt" in the second, and did not bowl.

== Later life ==
Thomson married Mary Elizabeth Lindsay, a widow from Fife, in Edinburgh in 1945. Reports in The Times across the 1930s and 1940s indicate Thomson played golf to a high standard at St Andrews. He retired to Hawridge Place, where he died in 1960. His wife died in 1982.
