= Counties 1 Hampshire =

English Rugby Union Regional League

- Current season or competition: 2025–26 Counties 1 Hampshire
- Sport: Rugby union
- Instituted: 2022
- Number of teams: 12
- Country: England
- Holders: Havant II (2024–25)
- Most titles: Havant II, Jersey and Petersfield (1 title)

Counties 1 Hampshire is an English level 7 rugby union regional league for rugby clubs in Hampshire and West Sussex and is administered by Hampshire Rugby Havant II are the current champions.

== Structure and format ==
The twelve teams play home and away matches from September through to April, making a total of twenty-two matches each. The results of the matches contribute points to the league as follows:

- 4 points are awarded for a win.
- 2 points are awarded for a draw.
- 0 points are awarded for a loss.

In addition:

- 1 losing (bonus) point is awarded to a team that loses a match by 7 points or fewer
- 1 additional (bonus) point is awarded to a team scoring 4 tries or more in a match

Promotion is to Regional 2 South Central which hosts teams from Dorset, Surrey, Berkshire, West Sussex & Hampshire; whilst relegation is to Counties 2 Hampshire.

== 2026–27 ==
Departing were Bognor promoted to Regional 2 South Central while Gosport & Fareham (10th), Guernsey Vikings (11th) and Eastleigh (12th) were relegated to Counties 2 Hampshire.

Team	Ground	Capacity	City/Area	Previous season
Andover	Foxcotte Lane		Andover, Hampshire	4th
Basingstoke	Down Grange		Basingstoke, Hampshire	3rd
Bournemouth II	Chapel Gate		Bournemouth, Dorset	7th
Chichester	Oaklands Park		Chichester, West Sussex	6th
Ellingham & Ringwood	Parsonage Barn Lane		Ringwood, Hampshire	Relegated from Regional 2 South Central (12th)
Farnham II	Wilkinson Way		Farnham, Surrey	Promoted from Counties 2 Hampshire (champions)
Millbrook	Lordshill Recreational Ground		Southampton, Hampshire	9th
Portsmouth	The Rugby Camp		Portsmouth, Hampshire	2nd
Pulborough	Freelands		Pulborough, West Sussex	Promoted from Counties 2 Sussex (champions)
Sandown & Shanklin	The Fairway Ground		Sandown, Isle of Wight	5th
Trojans	Stoneham Lane		Eastleigh, Hampshire	Promoted from Counties 2 Hampshire (runners up)
Winchester II	North Walls Park		Winchester, Hampshire	8th

Locations of the 2026–27 Counties 1 Hampshire teams in Hampshire, Dorset, Surrey & West Sussex
Locations of the 2026-27 Counties 1 Hampshire teams on the Isle of Wight

== 2025–26 ==
=== Participating teams and locations ===
Departing were Havant II (1st) and Ellingham & Ringwood (2nd), promoted to Regional 2 South Central while New Milton (11th) and Trojans (12th) were relegated to Counties 2 Hampshire. Incoming teams were Millbrook (1st) and Winchester II (2nd), both promoted from Counties 2 Hampshire, while Chichester (11th) and Andover (12th) were both relegated from Regional 2 South Central.

Team	Ground	Capacity	City/Area	Previous season
Andover	Foxcotte Lane		Andover, Hampshire	Relegated from Regional 2 South Central (12th)
Basingstoke	Down Grange		Basingstoke, Hampshire	3rd
Bognor	Hampshire Avenue		Bognor Regis, West Sussex	5th
Bournemouth II	Chapel Gate		Bournemouth, Dorset	10th
Chichester	Oaklands Park		Chichester, West Sussex	Relegated from Regional 2 South Central (11th)
Eastleigh	The Hub		Eastleigh, Hampshire	9th
Gosport & Fareham	Gosport Park		Gosport, Hampshire	4th
Guernsey Vikings	Footes Lane	5,000 (720 seats)	Saint Peter Port, Guernsey	6th
Millbrook	Lordshill Recreational Ground		Southampton, Hampshire	Promoted from Counties 2 Hampshire (champions)
Portsmouth	The Rugby Camp		Portsmouth, Hampshire	7th
Sandown & Shanklin	The Fairway Ground		Sandown, Isle of Wight	8th
Winchester II	North Walls Park		Winchester, Hampshire	Promoted from Counties 2 Hampshire (2nd)

Locations of the 2025–26 Counties 1 Hampshire teams in Hampshire, Dorset, West Sussex & the Channel Islands
Locations of the 2025–26 Counties 1 Hampshire teams on the Isle of Wight

== 2024–25 ==
=== Participating teams and locations ===
Departing were Petersfield and Andover promoted to Regional 2 South Central; there was no relegation to Counties 2 Hampshire. Promoted from Counties 2 Hampshire were Sandown & Shanklin, Basingstoke and Guernsey St Jacques Vikings – an amateur club who are the 2XV to Guernsey Raiders. With two leaving and three joining the league was restored to twelve teams.

Team	Ground	Capacity	City/Area	Previous season
Basingstoke	Down Grange		Basingstoke, Hampshire	Promoted from Counties 2 Hampshire (2nd)
Bognor	Hampshire Avenue		Bognor Regis, West Sussex	9th
Bournemouth II	Chapel Gate		Bournemouth, Dorset	11th
Eastleigh	The Hub		Eastleigh, Hampshire	7th
Ellingham & Ringwood	Parsonage Barn Lane		Ringwood, Hampshire	6th
Gosport & Fareham	Gosport Park		Gosport, Hampshire	4th
Guernsey Vikings	Footes Lane	5,000 (720 seats)	Saint Peter Port, Guernsey	Promoted from Counties 2 Hampshire (3rd)
Havant II	Hook's Lane	1,500	Havant, Hampshire	3rd
New Milton & District	Ashley Recreation Ground		Ashley, New Milton, Hampshire	10th
Portsmouth	The Rugby Camp		Portsmouth, Hampshire	5th
Sandown & Shanklin	The Fairway Ground		Sandown, Isle of Wight	Promoted from Counties 2 Hampshire (champions)
Trojans	Stoneham Lane		Eastleigh, Hampshire	8th

Locations of the 2024–25 Counties 1 Hampshire teams in Hampshire, Dorset, West Sussex & the Channel Islands
Locations of the 2024–25 Counties 1 Hampshire teams on the Isle of Wight

=== League table ===
Counties 1 Hampshire 2024–25
	Team	Played	Won	Drawn	Lost	Points for	Points against	Points diff	Try bonus	Loss bonus	Points	Adjust
1	Havant II (P)	22	22	0	0	1302	432	870	22	0	110	
2	Ellingham & Ringwood (P)	22	18	0	4	753	436	317	13	2	87	
3	Basingstoke	22	15	0	7	613	549	64	12	2	74	
4	Gosport and Fareham	22	15	0	7	628	443	185	10	2	72	
5	Bognor	22	9	2	11	457	594	−137	10	2	52	
6	Guernsey Vikings	22	9	0	13	531	594	−63	10	5	52	+1
7	Portsmouth	22	11	0	11	553	416	137	8	4	51	−5
8	Sandown & Shanklin	22	8	1	13	529	635	−106	12	3	50	+1
9	Eastleigh	22	8	1	13	539	668	−129	10	3	48	
10	Bournemouth II	22	7	2	13	459	673	−214	8	3	43	
11	Trojans (R)	22	5	0	17	527	805	−278	10	4	34	
12	New Milton & District (R)	22	2	0	20	248	894	−646	2	3	3	−10
If teams are level at any stage, tiebreakers are applied in the following order: 1. Number of matches won 2. Number of draws 3. Difference between points for and against 4. Total number of points for 5. Aggregate number of points scored in matches between tied teams 6. Number of matches won excluding the first match, then the second and so on until the tie is settled
Green background are the promotion places. Pink background are the relegation places. Source:

== 2023–24 ==
=== Participating teams and locations ===
Departing were Jersey and Winchester promoted to Regional 2 South Central. Basingstoke finished 12th and were relegated to Counties 2 Hampshire. Alton finished 11th and would also have been relegated but declined to compete in the RFU leagues in 2023–24. With four teams leaving and only three joining the league ran with eleven sides.

Team	Ground	Capacity	City/Area	Previous season
Andover	Foxcotte Lane		Andover, Hampshire	4th
Bognor	Hampshire Avenue		Bognor Regis, West Sussex	Promoted from Counties 2 Hampshire (2nd)
Bournemouth II	Chapel Gate		Bournemouth, Dorset	9th
Eastleigh	The Hub		Eastleigh, Hampshire	5th
Ellingham & Ringwood	Parsonage Barn Lane		Ringwood, Hampshire	Promoted from Counties 2 Hampshire (1st)
Gosport & Fareham	Gosport Park		Gosport, Hampshire	6th
Havant II	Hook's Lane	1,500	Havant, Hampshire	3rd
New Milton & District	Ashley Recreation Ground		Ashley, New Milton, Hampshire	Promoted from Counties 2 Hampshire (3rd)
Petersfield	Penn's Place		Petersfield, Hampshire	10th
Portsmouth	The Rugby Camp		Portsmouth, Hampshire	7th
Trojans	Stoneham Lane		Eastleigh, Hampshire	8th

Locations of the 2023–24 Counties 1 Hampshire teams in Hampshire, Dorset and West Sussex

=== League table ===
Counties 1 Hampshire 2023–24
	Team	Played	Won	Drawn	Lost	Points for	Points against	Points diff	Try bonus	Loss bonus	Points	Adjust
1	Petersfield (P)	20	19	1	0	968	214	754	18	0	98	+2
2	Andover (P)	20	17	0	3	784	421	363	16	0	84	
3	Havant II	20	13	1	6	731	591	140	14	2	70	
4	Gosport and Fareham	20	11	2	7	656	520	136	13	3	64	
5	Portsmouth	20	10	1	9	495	410	85	6	4	52	
6	Ellingham & Ringwood	20	9	1	10	506	684	−178	9	1	48	
7	Eastleigh	20	9	0	11	534	490	44	7	5	48	
8	Trojans	20	8	0	12	493	856	−363	8	2	42	
9	Bognor	20	5	0	15	380	649	−269	7	2	29	
10	New Milton & District	20	3	1	16	379	654	−275	6	7	27	
11	Bournemouth II	20	2	1	17	281	718	−437	5	2	7	−10
If teams are level at any stage, tiebreakers are applied in the following order: 1. Number of matches won 2. Number of draws 3. Difference between points for and against 4. Total number of points for 5. Aggregate number of points scored in matches between tied teams 6. Number of matches won excluding the first match, then the second and so on until the tie is settled
Green background are the promotion places. Source:

== 2022–23 ==
=== Participating clubs and locations ===
This was the first season following the RFU Adult Competition Review. The league was similar to London 3 South West with six of the same sides, while two teams – Gosport & Fareham and Havant II – from Hampshire Premier (level 8) were promoted to fill the league, and two – Eastleigh and Winchester – were level transferred from London 2 South West (level 7). London 3SW teams from Surrey, Sussex and SW London were absorbed into Counties 1 Surrey/Sussex. The league was supplemented by the addition of Bournemouth 2XV and Jersey.

Team	Ground	Capacity	City/Area	Previous season
Alton	Antsey Park		Alton, Hampshire	9th L3SW
Andover	Foxcotte Lane		Andover, Hampshire	5th L3SW
Basingstoke	Down Grange		Basingstoke, Hampshire	11th L3SW
Bournemouth II	Chapel Gate		Bournemouth, Dorset	New entry
Eastleigh	The Hub		Eastleigh, Hampshire	4th L2SW
Gosport & Fareham	Gosport Park		Gosport, Hampshire	2nd Hampshire Premier
Havant II	Hook's Lane	1,500	Havant, Hampshire	1st Hampshire Premier
Jersey	St Peter		Saint Peter, Jersey	New entry
Petersfield	Penn's Place		Petersfield, Hampshire	2nd L3SW
Portsmouth	The Rugby Camp		Portsmouth, Hampshire	10th L3SW
Trojans	Stoneham Lane		Eastleigh, Hampshire	7th L3SW
Winchester	North Walls Park		Winchester, Hampshire	7th L2SW

Locations of the 2022–23 Counties 1 Hampshire teams in Hampshire Dorset & the Channel Islands

=== League table ===
Counties 1 Hampshire 2022–23
	Team	Played	Won	Drawn	Lost	Points for	Points against	Points diff	Try bonus	Loss bonus	Points	Adjust
1	Jersey (P)	21	21	0	0	1130	183	947	17	0	104	+3
2	Winchester (P)	22	19	0	3	888	247	641	15	0	93	+2
3	Havant II	22	16	0	6	878	385	493	16	2	82	
4	Andover	22	13	0	9	587	427	160	9	6	67	
5	Eastleigh	22	13	0	9	553	656	−103	10	1	63	
6	Gosport and Fareham	22	11	1	10	520	548	−28	10	3	59	
7	Portsmouth	22	9	0	13	428	712	−284	6	2	44	
8	Trojans	22	7	0	15	554	576	−22	9	7	44	
9	Bournemouth II	21	6	1	14	377	621	−244	5	5	36	
10	Petersfield	22	6	1	15	345	982	−637	4	1	31	
11	Alton	22	6	0	16	373	735	−362	2	2	23	−5
12	Basingstoke (R)	22	2	1	19	275	836	−561	2	4	16	
If teams are level at any stage, tiebreakers are applied in the following order: 1. Number of matches won 2. Number of draws 3. Difference between points for and against 4. Total number of points for 5. Aggregate number of points scored in matches between tied teams 6. Number of matches won excluding the first match, then the second and so on until the tie is settled
Green background are the promotion places. Pink background is the relegation place. Source:

== Counties 1 Hampshire honours (2022–present) ==
Following the RFU Adult Competition Review, the league was made up of ten clubs from Hampshire, one from Jersey and one from Bournemouth, Dorset. Promotion is to Regional 2 South Central while relegation is to Counties 2 Hampshire.

Counties 1 Hampshire
Season	No of teams	Champions	Runner-up	Relegated team(s)	Ref
2022–23	12	Jersey	Winchester	Basingstoke (12th)	
2023–24	11	Petersfield	Andover	No relegation. Bournemouth II (11th)	
2024–25	12	Havant	Ellingham & Ringwood	Trojans (11th) and New Milton & District (12th)	
Green backgrounds are the promotion places.

== Summary of champions and runners-up ==
Team	Champions	Year(s)	Runner-up	Year(s)
Jersey	1	2023		
Petersfield	1	2024		
Havant II	1	2025		
Winchester			2023	1
Andover			2024	1
Ellingham & Ringwood			2025	1
