= Hampshire Plate =

English rugby union competition

- Sport: Rugby Union
- Instituted: 1990; 36 years ago
- Country: England
- Holders: Fareham Heathens (4th title) (2018–19)
- Most titles: Fareham Heathens, Farnborough (4 titles)
- Website: Hampshire RFU

The Hampshire Plate is an annual rugby union knock-out club competition organised by the Hampshire Rugby Football Union. It was first introduced during the 1990–91 season, with the inaugural winners being Fareham Heathens. It is the third most important rugby union cup competition in Hampshire, behind the Hampshire Cup and Hampshire Bowl. The Plate was initially replaced by the Bowl competition for the 1999–00 season but was re-introduced for 2003–04.

The Hampshire Plate is currently open to club sides based in Hampshire, the Isle of Wight and the Channel Islands, who play between tier 9 (Hampshire Premier) and tier 11 (Hampshire 2) of the English rugby union league system, although teams from outside the league structure have also been invited to take part. The format is a knockout cup with a preliminary round, quarter-finals, semi-finals and a final to be held at the home ground of one of the finalists between March–May.

== Hampshire Plate winners ==
Hampshire Plate Finals
Season	Winner	Score	Runners–up	Venue
1990–91	Fareham Heathens	16–13	Esso Fawley	
1991–92	Southampton	13–12	Esso Fawley	
1992–93	Gosport & Fareham	37–6	Farnborough	
1993–94	Southampton	24–20	Esso Fawley	
1994–95	Farnborough	33–9	Millbrook	
1995–96	Farnborough	17–7	Petersfield	
1996–97	Esso Fawley	25–15	Isle of Wight	
1997–98	Ventnor	36–19	Southampton Institute	
1998–99	Southampton Institute	37–20	Portsmouth University	
2000–02	No competition			
2003–04	Millbrook	22–3	Fareham Heathens	
2004–05	University of Southampton	40–18	Jersey United Banks	Wide Lane Sports Ground, Southampton, Hampshire
2005–06	Southampton University Medics	17–6	Millbrook	Lordshill Recreational Ground, Southampton, Hampshire
2006–07	Southampton Solent University	40–10	Farnborough	
2007–08	Eastleigh	15–8	Farnborough	Bishopstoke Road, Eastleigh, Hampshire
2008–09	U.S. Portsmouth	21–14	Farnborough	
2009–10	Southampton University Hospitals	24–12	Jersey United Banks	
2010–11	Millbrook	15–13	University of Southampton	Wide Lane Sports Ground, Southampton, Hampshire
2011–12	Jersey United Banks	25–0	Southampton University Medics	Southampton, Hampshire
2012–13	Millbrook	15–0	Andover	Goodship Ground, Andover, Hampshire
2013–14	Farnborough	27–11	Fareham Heathens	Oak Farm Playing Fields, Farnborough, Hampshire
2014–15	Fareham Heathens	14–11	Chineham	Fortress Chineham, Basingstoke, Hampshire
2015–16	Fareham Heathens	29–11	Ellingham & Ringwood	Raymond Brown Memorial Ground, Ringwood, Hampshire
2016–17	Petersfield	25–13	Farnborough	Penn's Place, Petersfield, Hampshire
2017–18	Farnborough	45–21	Southampton	Oak Farm Playing Fields, Farnborough, Hampshire
2018–19	Fareham Heathens	31–25	Alton	Cams Alders Recreation Centre, Fareham, Hampshire
2019–20				
2019–20				

== Number of wins ==
- Fareham Heathens (4)
- Farnborough (4)
- Millbrook (3)
- Southampton (2)
- Eastleigh (1)
- Esso Fawley (1)
- Gosport & Fareham (1)
- Jersey United Banks (1)
- Petersfield (1)
- Southampton Institute (1)
- Southampton Solent University (1)
- Southampton University Hospitals (1)
- Southampton University Medics (1)
- U.S. Portsmouth (1)
- University of Southampton (1)
- Ventnor (1)

== See also ==
- Hampshire RFU
- Hampshire Cup
- Hampshire Bowl
- English rugby union system
- Rugby union in England
