= Counties 2 Hampshire =

Level 9 rugby league in England

- Current season or competition: 2024–25 Counties 2 Hampshire
- Sport: Rugby union
- Instituted: 1987; 39 years ago (as Hampshire 1)
- Number of teams: 13
- Country: England
- Most titles: Andover, Petersfield, United Services Portsmouth (3 titles)
- Website: englandrugby.com

Counties 2 Hampshire (formerly Hampshire Premier) is an English level 8 Rugby Union league for teams based in Hampshire and the Isle of Wight. Up until the 2017–18 season it was known as Hampshire 1 but was changed to Hampshire Premier due to restructuring of the Hampshire leagues, which would see the re-introduction of a third division as well as 2nd and 3rd XV sides joining for the first time. Following the RFU's Adult Competition Review, from season 2022–23 it adopted its current name Counties 2 Hampshire.

Each year some of the clubs in this division also take part in the RFU Junior Vase - a level 9-12 national competition.

Promoted teams move up to Counties 1 Hampshire. Relegated teams drop down to Counties 3 Hampshire.

The points system is as follows.

- 4 points awarded for a win.
- 2 points awarded for a draw.
- 0 points awarded for a loss.
- 1 "bonus" (+) point awarded for scoring 4 tries (or more).
- 1 "bonus" (+) point awarded for losing by 7 points (or fewer).

No team can get more than 5 points in a match. Points awarded are the same regardless of outcome at home or away. The new point system has been in effect since 2010–11 season.

== Teams for 2026-27 ==
Departing were Farnham II and Trojans promoted to Counties 1 Hampshire as champions and runners-up respectively, while Andover II (11th) and Petersfield II (12th) were relegated to Counties 3 Hampshire.

Team	Ground	Capacity	City/Area	Previous season
Eastleigh	The Hub		Eastleigh, Hampshire	Relegated from Counties 1 Hampshire (12th)
Fareham Heathens	Cams Alders Recreation Centre		Fareham, Hampshire	8th
Fordingbridge	The Recreation Ground		Fordingbridge, Hampshire	5th
Gosport & Fareham	Gosport Park		Gosport, Hampshire	Relegated from Counties 1 Hampshire (10th)
Guernsey Vikings	Footes Lane	5,000 (720 seats)	Saint Peter Port, Guernsey	Relegated from Counties 1 Hampshire (11th)
Havant III	Hook's Lane	1,500	Bedhampton, Havant, Hampshire	3rd
New Milton & District	Ashley Recreation Ground		Ashley, New Milton, Hampshire	4th
Romsey	Romsey Sports Centre		Romsey, Hampshire	7th
Southampton	Test Park Playing Fields		Southampton, Hampshire	9th
Tottonians II	Water Lane		Totton, Hampshire	Promoted from Counties 3 Hampshire (runners-up)
United Services Portsmouth	Burnaby Road	8,000	Portsmouth, Hampshire	6th
Ventnor	Watcombe Bottom		Ventnor, Isle of Wight	Promoted from Counties 3 Hampshire (champions)

Locations of the 2026-27 Counties 2 Hampshire teams in Hampshire & the Channel Islands
Locations of the 2026-27 Counties 2 Hampshire teams on the Isle of Wight

== Teams for 2025–26 ==
Departing were Millbrook and Winchester II promoted to Counties 1 Hampshire as champions and runners-up respectively, while Isle of Wight were relegated to Counties 3 Hampshire. Locksheath Pumas (9th in 2024-25) did not return for the new season and instead joined the Hampshire Premiership SE merit league.

Chichester II (8th in 2024-25) started the season but subsequently withdrew leaving eleven clubs to contest the outstanding fixtures.

Team	Ground	Capacity	City/Area	Previous season
Andover II	Foxcotte Lane		Andover, Hampshire	Promoted from Counties 3 Hampshire (champions)
Farnham II	Wilkinson Way		Farnham, Surrey	New entry
Fareham Heathens	Cams Alders Recreation Centre		Fareham, Hampshire	6th
Fordingbridge	The Recreation Ground		Fordingbridge, Hampshire	5th
Havant III	Hook's Lane	1,500	Bedhampton, Havant, Hampshire	4th
New Milton & District	Ashley Recreation Ground		Ashley, New Milton, Hampshire	Relegated from Counties 1 Hampshire (12th)
Petersfield II	Penn's Place		Petersfield, Hampshire	7th
Romsey	Romsey Sports Centre		Romsey, Hampshire	Promoted from Counties 3 Hampshire (runners-up)
Southampton	Test Park Playing Fields		Southampton, Hampshire	Promoted from Counties 3 Hampshire (3rd)
Trojans	Stoneham Lane		Eastleigh, Hampshire	Relegated from Counties 1 Hampshire (11th)
United Services Portsmouth	Burnaby Road	8,000	Portsmouth, Hampshire	3rd

Locations of the 2025-26 Counties 2 Hampshire teams in Hampshire, Surrey & West Sussex

== Teams for 2024–25 ==
Departing were Guernsey Vikings, Sandown & Shanklin and Basingstoke, all promoted to Counties 1 Hampshire. Tottonians II were relegated to Counties 3 Hampshire.

Joining were Havant III, Isle Of Wight, Fareham Heathans, all promoted, and Petersfield II.

Team	Ground	Capacity	City/Area	Previous season
Chichester II	Oaklands Park		Chichester, West Sussex	8th
Fareham Heathens	Cams Alders Recreation Centre		Fareham, Hampshire	Promoted from Counties 3 Hampshire (runners-up)
Fordingbridge	The Recreation Ground		Fordingbridge, Hampshire	7th
Havant III	Hook's Lane	1,500	Bedhampton, Havant, Hampshire	Promoted from Counties 3 Hampshire (champions)
Isle Of Wight	Footways		Wootton, Isle of Wight	Promoted from Counties 3 Hampshire (3rd)
Locksheath Pumas	Wide Lane Sports Ground		Eastleigh, Hampshire	9th
Millbrook	Lordshill Recreational Ground		Southampton, Hampshire	5th
Petersfield II	Penn's Place		Petersfield, Hampshire	New entry
United Services Portsmouth	Burnaby Road	8,000	Portsmouth, Hampshire	4th
Winchester II	North Walls Park		Winchester, Hampshire	7th

Locations of the 2024-25 Counties 2 Hampshire teams in Hampshire & West Sussex

== Teams for 2023–24 ==
Departing were Ellingham & Ringwood, Bognor and New Milton & District, all promoted to Counties 1 Hampshire. Alresford and Eastleigh II were relegated to Counties 3 Hampshire.

Joining were Guernsey Vikings, Locksheath Pumas and Winchester II, all promoted, and Basingstoke, relegated. Alton finished 11th in Counties 1 Hampshire the previous season and would also have been relegated too but declined to compete in the RFU leagues in 2023-24.

Team	Ground	Capacity	City/Area	Previous season
Basingstoke	Down Grange		Basingstoke, Hampshire	Relegated from Counties 1 Hampshire
Chichester II	Oaklands Park		Chichester, West Sussex	8th
Fordingbridge	The Recreation Ground		Fordingbridge, Hampshire	7th
Guernsey Vikings	Footes Lane	5,000 (720 seats)	Saint Peter Port, Guernsey	Promoted from Counties 3 Hampshire (3rd)
Locksheath Pumas	Wide Lane Sports Ground		Eastleigh, Hampshire	Promoted from Counties 3 Hampshire (3rd)
Millbrook	Lordshill Recreational Ground		Southampton, Hampshire	6th
Sandown & Shanklin	The Fairway Ground		Sandown, Isle of Wight	4th
Tottonians II	Water Lane		Totton, Hampshire	9th
United Services Portsmouth	Burnaby Road	8,000	Portsmouth, Hampshire	5th
Winchester II	North Walls Park		Winchester, Hampshire	Promoted from Counties 3 Hampshire (runners-up)

Locations of the 2023-24 Counties 2 Hampshire teams in Hampshire & West Sussex
Locations of the 2023-24 Counties 2 Hampshire teams on the Isle of Wight

== Teams for 2022–23 ==
This was the first season following the RFU Adult Competition Review with the league adopting its new name of Counties 2 Hampshire.

Departing were Havant II and Gosport & Fareham both promoted to Counties 1 Hampshire. Also leaving were Locksheath Pumas, relegated to Counties 3 Hampshire.

Joining were United Services Portsmouth and Tottonians 2XV.

Team	Ground	Capacity	City/Area	Previous season
Alresford	Alresford Recreation Centre		New Alresford, Hampshire	7th
Bognor	Hampshire Avenue		Bognor Regis, West Sussex	3rd
Chichester II	Oaklands Park		Chichester, West Sussex	10th
Eastleigh II	The Hub		Eastleigh, Hampshire	9th
Ellingham & Ringwood	Parsonage Barn Lane		Ringwood, Hampshire	5th
Fordingbridge	The Recreation Ground		Fordingbridge, Hampshire	11th
Millbrook	Lordshill Recreational Ground		Southampton, Hampshire	8th
New Milton & District	Ashley Recreation Ground		Ashley, New Milton, Hampshire	6th
Sandown & Shanklin	The Fairway Ground		Sandown, Isle of Wight	4th
Tottonians II	Water Lane		Totton, Hampshire	Promoted from Hampshire 1 ) (champions)
United Services Portsmouth	Burnaby Road	8,000	Portsmouth, Hampshire	Promoted from Hampshire 1 ) (runners-up)

Locations of the 2022-23 Counties 2 Hampshire teams in Hampshire & West Sussex
Locations of the 2022-23 Counties 2 Hampshire teams on the Isle of Wight

== Teams for 2021–22 ==
The teams competing in 2021–22 achieved their places in the league based on performances in 2019-20, the 'previous season' column in the table below refers to that season not 2020–21.

Team	Ground	Capacity	City/Area	Previous season
Alresford	Alresford Recreation Centre		New Alresford, Hampshire	9th
Bognor	Hampshire Avenue		Bognor Regis, West Sussex	4th
Chichester II	Oaklands Park		Chichester, West Sussex	Promoted from Hampshire 1 (champions)
Eastleigh II	The Hub		Eastleigh, Hampshire	11th
Ellingham & Ringwood	Parsonage Barn Lane		Ringwood, Hampshire	10th
Gosport & Fareham	Gosport Park		Gosport, Hampshire	Relegated from London 3 South West (11th)
Fordingbridge	The Recreation Ground		Fordingbridge, Hampshire	7th
Havant II	Hook's Lane	1,500	Bedhampton, Havant, Hampshire	3rd
Locksheath Pumas	Wide Lane Sports Ground		Eastleigh, Hampshire	Promoted from Hampshire 1 (4th)
Millbrook	Lordshill Recreational Ground		Southampton, Hampshire	8th
New Milton & District	Ashley Recreation Ground		Ashley, New Milton, Hampshire	6th
Sandown & Shanklin	The Fairway Ground		Sandown, Isle of Wight	5th

Locations of the 2021-22 Hampshire Premier teams in Hampshire & West Sussex
Locations of the 2021-22 Hampshire Premier teams on the Isle of Wight

== Season 2020–21 ==
On 30 October the RFU announced that a decision had been taken to cancel Adult Competitive Leagues (National League 1 and below) for the 2020/21 season meaning Hampshire Premier was not contested.

== Teams for 2019–20 ==
Team	Ground	Capacity	City/Area	Previous season
Alresford	Alresford Recreation Centre		New Alresford, Hampshire	7th
Alton	Antsey Park		Alton, Hampshire	Promoted from Hampshire 1 (champions)
Bognor	Hampshire Avenue		Bognor Regis, West Sussex	3rd
Eastleigh II	The Hub		Eastleigh, Hampshire	9th
Ellingham & Ringwood	Parsonage Barn Lane		Ringwood, Hampshire	Promoted from Hampshire 1 (runners up)
Fareham Heathens	Cams Alders Recreation Centre		Fareham, Hampshire	8th
Farnborough	Oak Farm Playing Fields		Farnborough, Hampshire	Promoted from Hampshire 1 (3rd)
Fordingbridge	The Recreation Ground		Fordingbridge, Hampshire	4th
Havant II	Hook's Lane	1,500	Bedhampton, Havant, Hampshire	N/A
Millbrook	Lordshill Recreational Ground		Southampton, Hampshire	6th
New Milton & District	Ashley Recreation Ground		Ashley, New Milton, Hampshire	5th
Petersfield	Penn's Place		Petersfield, Hampshire	Relegated from London 3 SW (11th)
Sandown & Shanklin	The Fairway Ground		Sandown, Isle of Wight	Runners up (lost playoff)

Locations of the 2019-20 Hampshire Premier teams in Hampshire & West Sussex
Locations of the 2019-20 Hampshire Premier teams on the Isle of Wight

== Teams for 2018–19 ==
Team	Ground	Capacity	City/Area	Previous season
Alresford	Alresford Recreation Centre		New Alresford, Hampshire	7th
Basingstoke	Down Grange	2,500 (250 seats)	Basingstoke, Hampshire	Relegated from London 3 SW (12th)
Bognor	Hampshire Avenue		Bognor Regis, West Sussex	2nd (lost playoff)
Eastleigh II	The Hub		Eastleigh, Hampshire	N/A
Fareham Heathens	Cams Alders Recreation Centre		Fareham, Hampshire	6th
Fordingbridge	The Recreation Ground		Fordingbridge, Hampshire	4th
Gosport & Fareham II	Gosport Park		Gosport, Hampshire	N/A
Millbrook	Lordshill Recreational Ground		Southampton, Hampshire	3rd
New Milton & District	Ashley Recreation Ground		Ashley, New Milton, Hampshire	Relegated from London 3 SW (11th)
Portsmouth II	The Rugby Camp		Portsmouth, Hampshire	N/A
Sandown & Shanklin	The Fairway Ground		Sandown, Isle of Wight	5th
Tottonians II	Water Lane		Totton, Hampshire	N/A

Locations of the 2018-19 Hampshire Premier teams in Hampshire & West Sussex
Locations of the 2018-19 Hampshire Premier teams on the Isle of Wight

== Teams for 2017–18 ==
Team	Ground	Capacity	City/Area	Previous season
Alresford	Alresford Recreation Centre		New Alresford, Hampshire	Promoted from Hampshire 2 (champions)
Bognor	Hampshire Avenue		Bognor Regis, West Sussex	Relegated from London 3 South West (12th)
Ellingham & Ringwood	Parsonage Barn Lane		Ringwood, Hampshire	5th
Fareham Heathens	Cams Alders Recreation Centre		Fareham, Hampshire	7th
Fordingbridge	The Recreation Ground		Fordingbridge, Hampshire	3rd
Isle Of Wight	Footways		Wootton, Isle of Wight	6th
Millbrook	Lordshill Recreational Ground		Southampton, Hampshire	Relegated from London 3 South West (11th)
Overton	The Old Cricket Ground		Laverstoke, Hampshire	Promoted from Hampshire 2 (runners up)
Sandown & Shanklin	The Fairway Ground		Sandown, Isle of Wight	4th
United Services Portsmouth	Burnaby Road	8,000	Portsmouth, Hampshire	Relegated from London 3 South West (10th)
Ventnor	Watcombe Bottom		Ventnor, Isle of Wight	8th

Locations of the 2017-18 Hampshire 1 teams in Hampshire & West Sussex
Locations of the 2017-18 Hampshire 1 teams on the Isle of Wight

== Teams for 2016–17 ==
- Chineham
- Ellingham & Ringwood
- Fareham Heathens
- Farnborough
- Fordingbridge
- Isle of Wight
- New Milton & District (promoted from London 3 South West)
- Petersfield
- Romsey (promoted from Hampshire 2)
- Sandown & Shanklin
- Ventnor (promoted from Hampshire 2)

== Teams and results for 2015–16 ==
Position	Team	Games	Won	Drew	Lost	Points
1	Millbrook	20	18	0	2	89
2	Bognor	20	18	0	2	88
3	Fareham Heathens	20	17	0	3	78
4	Fordlingbridge	20	11	0	9	55
5	Sandown & Shanklin	20	11	0	9	54
6	Chineham	20	10	0	10	52
7	Farnborough	20	7	1	12	38
8	Isle of Wight	20	5	0	15	32
9	Petersfield	20	5	1	14	26
10	Ellingham & Ringwood	20	6	0	14	22
11	Locksheath Pumas	20	1	0	19	3

- Chineham (promoted from Hampshire 2)
- Ellingham & Ringwood (relegated from London 3 South West)
- Locksheath Pumas (promoted from Hampshire 2)
- Sandown & Shanklin (relegated from London 3 South West)

== Teams and results for 2014–15 ==
Position	Team	Games	Won	Drew	Lost	For	Against	Difference	+ Points	Points
1	United Services, Portsmouth	18	18	0	0	807	266	541	18	90
2	Millbrook	18	15	0	3	557	277	280	14	76
3	Bognor	18	13	0	5	523	334	189	13	65
4	Fordingbridge	18	12	0	6	627	404	223	14	62
5	Fareham Heathens	18	11	0	7	418	332	86	10	54
6	Petersfield	18	6	0	12	394	505	-111	11	35
7	Isle of Wight	18	5	0	13	323	653	-330	4	24
8	Farnborough	18	4	0	14	331	479	-148	9	20
9	Romsey	18	4	0	14	273	604	-331	4	20
10	Alton	18	2	0	16	232	631	-399	6	9

Fareham and Petersfield promoted into Hampshire 1 at the start of the season from Hampshire 2.

== Teams and results for 2013–14 ==
Position	Team	Games	Won	Drew	Lost	Points
1	Andover	22	19	0	3	93
2	Fordingbridge	22	19	0	3	93
3	Millbrook	22	17	0	5	86
4	United Services, Portsmouth	22	15	0	7	76
5	Solent Uni	22	15	0	7	70
6	Farnborough	22	13	0	9	65
7	Bognor	22	10	0	12	56
8	Romsey	22	6	0	16	34
9	Isle of Wight	22	6	0	16	33
10	Alton	22	6	0	16	30
11	Southampton	22	5	0	17	25
12	Overton	22	1	0	21	9

Solent Uni promoted into Hampshire 1 at the start of the season from Hampshire 2.

Andover promoted to London South West 3 at the end of the season.

Southampton and Overton demoted to Hampshire 2 at the end of the season.

== Teams and results for 2012–13 ==
Position	Team	Games	Won	Drew	Lost	Points
1	New Milton & District	22	20	0	2	98
2	Fordingbridge	22	17	0	5	85
3	Alton	22	17	0	5	82
4	Millbrook	22	14	0	8	71
5	United Services, Portsmouth	22	12	1	9	63
6	Andover	22	13	0	9	62
7	Farnborough	22	10	0	12	54
8	Romsey	22	8	1	13	44
9	Isle of Wight	22	8	0	14	42
10	Southampton	22	5	1	16	30
11	Petersfield	22	2	2	18	18
12	Aldershot & Fleet	22	3	1	17	17

Southampton promoted into Hampshire 1 at the start of the season from Hampshire 2.

New Milton & District promoted to London 3 South West at the end of the season.

Aldershot & Fleet and Petersfield demoted to Hampshire 2 at the end of the season.

== Teams and results for 2011-12 ==
Position	Team	Games	Won	Drew	Lost	+ Points	Points
1	Eastleigh	22	21	0	1	16	100
2	Fordingbridge	22	18	0	4	16	88
3	United Services, Portsmouth	22	16	0	6	17	81
4	Millbrook	22	17	0	5	12	80
5	New Milton & District	22	13	0	9	16	68
6	Isle of Wight	22	13	0	9	11	63
7	Petersfield	22	12	0	10	9	57
8	Romsey	22	8	0	14	7	39
9	Farnborough	22	1	5	17	18	38
10	Ventnor	22	5	0	16	2	22
11	Lytchett Minster	22	2	0	19	1	9
12	Southsea Nomads	22	2	0	18	-1	7

Southsea Nomads promoted into Hampshire 1 at the start of the season from Hampshire 2.

Lytchett Minster transferred to Dorset and Wilts Regional Leagues at the end of the season.

Eastleigh promoted to London 3 South West at the end of the season.

Southsea Nomads and Ventnor demoted to Hampshire 2 at the end of the season.

== Teams and results for 2010-11 ==
Position	Team	Games	Won	Drew	Lost	Points
1	Andover	20	18	0	2	86
2	Eastleigh	20	16	0	4	75
3	Millbrook	20	13	0	7	66
4	New Milton & District	20	13	0	7	60
5	Farnborough	20	10	0	10	52
6	United Services, Portsmouth	20	11	0	9	48
7	Romsey	20	9	0	11	41
8	Ventnor	20	6	1	13	34
9	Isle of Wight	20	6	0	14	32
10	Southampton	20	5	0	15	28
11	Fareham Heathens	20	2	1	17	12

Andover promoted to London 3 South West at the end of the season.

Fareham Heathens and Southampton demoted to Hampshire 2 at the end of the season.

== Teams and results for 2009-10 ==
Position	Team	Games	Won	Drew	Lost	Points
1	Alton	20	19	0	1	38
2	Petersfield	19	16	0	3	32
3	Eastleigh	20	15	0	5	30
4	Millbrook	20	11	1	8	23
5	Romsey	20	11	0	9	22
6	Southampton	20	10	0	10	20
7	New Milton & District	20	7	0	13	14
8	United Services, Portsmouth	20	6	1	13	13
9	Farnborough	20	6	0	14	12
10	Fareham Heathens	20	5	1	14	11
11	Aldershot & Fleet	19	1	1	17	3

Alton promoted to London 3 South West at the end of the season.

Aldershot & Fleet demoted to Hampshire 2 at the end of the season.

== Teams and results for 2008-09 ==
Position	Team	Games	Won	Drew	Lost	Points
1	Fordingbridge	18	14	1	3	29
2	Sandown & Shanklin	18	12	2	4	26
3	United Services, Portsmouth	18	11	2	5	24
4	Farnborough	18	11	0	7	22
5	Alton	18	8	1	9	17
6	Romsey	18	6	1	11	13
7	New Milton & District	18	8	0	10	12
8	Eastleigh	18	5	1	12	11
9	Southampton	18	5	0	13	10
10	East Dorset	18	6	0	11	8

== Original teams ==
When league rugby began in 1987 this division (known as Hampshire 1) contained the following teams:

- Esso
- Fareham Heathens
- Gosport (Note: Would later merge with Fareham RFC to form Gosport & Fareham RFC.)
- Isle Of Wight
- Millbrook
- New Milton & District
- Petersfield
- Rushmoor
- Sandown & Shanklin
- Southampton
- Tottonians

== Hampshire Premier honours ==
=== Hampshire 1 (1987–1993) ===
Originally known as Hampshire 1, it was tier 8 league with promotion up to London 3 South West and relegation down to Hampshire 2.

Hampshire 1
Season	No of Teams	Champions	Runners–up	Relegated Teams
1987–88	11	Gosport	Southampton	New Milton & District, Petersfield
1988–89	11	Southampton	Esso	Fordingbridge, Tottonians
1989–90	11	Eastleigh	Millbrook	Fareham Heathens, Andover
1990–91	11	Winchester	Jersey	Farnborough
1991–92	11	Jersey	Millbrook	Fareham Heathens
1992–93	12	Southampton	Gosport	Esso, Guernsey
Green backgrounds are promotion places.

=== Hampshire 1 (1993–1996) ===
The creation of National 5 South meant that Hampshire 1 dropped from a tier 8 league to a tier 9 league for the years that National 5 South was active. Promotion and relegation continued to London 3 South West and Hampshire 2 respectively.

Hampshire 1
Season	No of Teams	Champions	Runners–up	Relegated Teams
1993–94	13	Gosport	Jersey	Romsey, Andover
1994–95	13	Jersey	United Services Portsmouth	Isle Of Wight, New Milton & District, Sandown & Shanklin
1995–96	13	Winchester	United Services Portsmouth	Trojans, Esso
Green backgrounds are promotion places.

=== Hampshire 1 (1996–2000) ===
The cancellation of National 5 South at the end of the 1995–96 season meant that Hampshire 1 reverted to being a tier 8 league. Promotion and relegation continued to London 3 South West and Hampshire 2 respectively.

Hampshire 1
Season	No of Teams	Champions	Runners–up	Relegated Teams
1996–97	12	Esso	Southampton (Note: 3rd place Farnborough also promoted.)	Fordingbridge, Ventnor
1997–98	9	Andover	Millbrook	No relegation (Note: As the league was to increase from 9 to 10 teams for the following season, there was no relegation.)
1998–99	10	Tottonians	Trojans	Overton, Eastleigh
1999–00	10	United Services Portsmouth	Ventnor	Isle Of Wight
Green backgrounds are promotion places.

=== Hampshire 1 (2000–2009) ===
The introduction of London 4 South West ahead of the 2000–01 season meant Hampshire 1 dropped to become a tier 9 league with promotion to this new division. Relegation continued to Hampshire 1.

Hampshire 1
Season	No of Teams	Champions	Runners–up	Relegated Teams
2000–01	10	Farnborough	Trojans	New Milton & District, Ventnor
2001–02	10	Petersfield	Southampton	Fawley
2002–03	10	Romsey	Farnborough	Hamble, Nomads
2003–04	10	Guernsey	Trojans	Fawley, Eastleigh
2004–05	10	Trojans	Sandown & Shanklin	Alresford, Nomads, Farnborough
2005–06	10	Sandown & Shanklin	United Services Portsmouth	Romsey, Isle Of Wight, Aldershot & Fleet
2006–07	10	Trojans	Ellingham & Ringwood	Millbrook, Eastleigh
2007–08	10	Ellingham & Ringwood	Sandown & Shanklin	Fareham Heathens
2008–09	10	Fordingbridge	Sandown & Shanklin	No relegation (Note: There was no relegation as East Dorset (who would finish 7th) dropped out of the Hampshire league at the end of the season and joined Dorset & Wilts 3 South.)
Green backgrounds are promotion places.

=== Hampshire 1 (2009–2018) ===
Hampshire 1 remained a tier 9 league despite national restructuring by the RFU. Promotion was to London 3 South West (formerly London 4 South West) and relegation to Hampshire 2.

Hampshire 1
Season	No of Teams	Champions	Runners–up	Relegated Teams
2009–10	11	Alton	Petersfield	Aldershot & Fleet
2010–11	11	Andover	Eastleigh	Fareham Heathens, Southampton
2011–12	12	Eastleigh	Fordingbridge	Nomads, Lytchett Minster, Ventnor
2012–13	12	New Milton & District	Fordingbridge	Aldershot & Fleet, Petersfield
2013–14	12	Andover	Fordingbridge	Overton, Southampton
2014–15	10 (Note: There was originally 11 teams in the league but Solent University had to withdraw from the league due to difficulties fielding a regular match squad.)	United Services Portsmouth	Millbrook	Alton, Romsey
2015–16	11	Millbrook	Bognor	Locksheath Pumas (Note: Only one team was relegated at the end of the season as Hampshire 2 would go from 10 to 9 teams the following seasons.)
2016–17	11	Petersfield	New Milton & District	Chineham, Farnborough, Romsey
2017–18	11	United Services Portsmouth	Bognor	Ventnor, Overton, Isle of Wight, Ellingham & Ringwood (Note: The restructuring of the Hampshire leagues for the following season and introduction of 2nd XV teams meant that there were more relegated teams than usual.)
Green backgrounds are promotion places.

=== Hampshire Premier (2018–present) ===
Restructuring of the Hampshire leagues saw Hampshire 1 renamed as Hampshire Premier. It remained a tier 9 league with promotion to London 3 South West and relegation to the new Hampshire 1 (formerly Hampshire 2).

Hampshire Premier
Season	No of Teams	Champions	Runners–up	Relegated Teams
2018–19	12	Basingstoke	Sandown & Shanklin	Gosport & Fareham II, Tottonians II, Portsmouth II
2019–20	13	Petersfield	Alton	Farnborough, Fareham Heathens
2020–21	13			
Green backgrounds are promotion places.

== Promotion play-offs ==
Since the 2000–01 season there has been a play-off between the runners-up of Hampshire Premier and Surrey 1 for the third and final promotion place to London 3 South West. The team with the superior league record has home advantage in the tie. At the end of the 2019–20 season the Surrey 1 teams have been the most successful with twelve wins to the Hampshire Premier teams seven; and the home team has won promotion on eleven occasions compared to the away teams eight.

Hampshire Premier v Surrey 1 promotion play-off results
Season	Home team	Score	Away team	Venue	Attendance
2000–01	Trojans (H)	15-14	Kingston (S)	Stoneham Lane, Eastleigh, Hampshire	
2001–02	Southampton (H)	27-18	KCS Old Boys (S)	Test Park Playing Fields, Southampton, Hampshire	
2002–03	Farnborough (H)	5-63	Old Paulines (S)	Oak Farm Playing Fields, Farnborough, Hampshire	
2003–04	Trojans (H)	14-46	Old Reigatian (S)	Stoneham Lane, Eastleigh, Hampshire	
2004–05	London Cornish (S)	27-14	Sandown & Shanklin (H)	Richardson Evans Memorial Playing Fields, Roehampton, London	
2005–06	United Services Portsmouth (H)	20-28	Old Caterhamians (S)	United Services Recreation Ground, Portsmouth, Hampshire	
2006–07	London South Africa (S)	71-10	Ellingham & Ringwood (H)	Wimbledon Park Athletics Stadium, Wimbledon, London	
2007–08	Sandown & Shanklin (H)	15-16	Old Alleynians (S)	The Fairway Ground, Sandown, Isle of Wight	
2008–09	Sandown & Shanklin (H)	17-10	Old Whitgiftian (S)	The Fairway Ground, Sandown, Isle of Wight	
2009–10	Petersfield (H)	19-15	Old Whitgiftian (S)	Penn's Place, Petersfield, Hampshire	
2010–11	Eastleigh (H)	30-10	Old Blues (S)	The Hub, Eastleigh, Hampshire	
2011–12	Fordingbridge (H)	11-29	Old Paulines (S)	The Recreation Ground, Fordingbridge, Hampshire	
2012–13	Old Cranleighans (S)	21-19	Fordingbridge (H)	The Old Cranleighan Club, Thames Ditton, Surrey	
2013–14	Fordingbridge (H)	6-36	Old Tonbridgians (S)	The Recreation Ground, Fordingbridge, Hampshire	
2014–15	Camberley (S)	49-10	Millbrook (H)	Watchetts Recreation Ground, Camberley, Surrey	
2015–16	Bognor (H)	HWO (Note: Bognor were promoted as Old Freemens did not manage to raise a team for the 2015-16 play-off game.)	Old Freemens (S)	Hampshire Avenue, Bognor Regis, West Sussex	
2016–17	New Milton & District (H)	41-17	Old Whitgiftian (S)	Normans Way, Ashley, Hampshire	
2017–18	Bognor (H)	7-52	Old Georgians (S)	Hampshire Avenue, Bognor Regis, West Sussex	
2018–19	Sandown & Shanklin (H)	18-22	Weybridge Vandals (S)	The Fairway Ground, Sandown, Isle of Wight	
2019–20	Cancelled due to COVID-19 pandemic in the United Kingdom. Best ranked runner up - Alton (H) - promoted instead.				
2020–21					
Green background is the promoted team. H = Hampshire Premier and S = Surrey 1

== Number of league titles ==
- Andover (3)
- Petersfield (3)
- United Services Portsmouth (3)
- Eastleigh (2)
- Gosport (2)
- Jersey (2)
- Southampton (2)
- Trojans (2)
- Winchester (2)
- Alton (1)
- Basingstoke (1)
- Ellingham & Ringwood (1)
- Esso (1)
- Farnborough (1)
- Fordingbridge (1)
- Guernsey (1)
- Millbrook (1)
- New Milton & District (1)
- Romsey (1)
- Tottonians (1)

== See also ==
- London & SE Division RFU
- Hampshire RFU
- English rugby union system
- Rugby union in England
