= United Services Portsmouth RFC =

English rugby union club, based in Portsmouth, Hampshire

(England) United Services Portsmouth RFC member of the RNRU
- Nickname: USP
- Founded: 1882; 144 years ago
- Region: Hampshire
- Ground: United Services Recreation Ground (Capacity: 1,000)
- Coach: Pony Moore
- Captain: William Dixon
- League: Counties 2 Hampshire

United Services Portsmouth RFC are a Rugby Union club based in Portsmouth, England. The club was founded in 1882 and play their home games at the United Services Recreation Ground.

== History ==
United Services Portsmouth RFC was founded in 1882, there being records of the club from that date With the exception of the 1884–85 season and the War Years, the club has unbroken records of fixtures. At the beginning of the twentieth century the club found it hard to gain support from service players, because it was considered necessary to turn out for civilian clubs to get first-class games. However, in 1902 the United Services Recreation Ground began to give financial support to the club to stimulate interest and by the time a Royal Navy Rugby Union was formed in 1906 the club was performing strongly with an excellent reputation and equally strong fixture list. It was described by Wavell Wakefield in the 1930s as one of the strongest clubs in the country. This dominance was helped in no small part by the continued sponsorship of the Royal Navy. Until the start of league rugby, the fixture list boasted the elite of domestic football (including Bath, Leicester, Harlequins, and Saracens).

In the professional era, the club no longer features as a first-class side. The early twenty-first century saw the club fielding three squads, The Bulldogs, Buccaneers and Crusaders. In order to shore up numbers the club is open to civilians. This results in a club that boasts a combination of players from the Royal Navy, Army, Air Force, local Civilians and Students from Portsmouth University.

The first squad compete at Level 8 and still play at the Burnaby Road United Services Recreation Ground. In the season 2014–15 the club won the Hampshire 1 League with an unprecedented 18 wins out of 18 and gained 18 try bonus points. The club is still backed by the Royal Navy Rugby Union.

== Notable players ==
International players include:

- England - W N Lapage
- England - Fischer Burges-Watson
- England - George Hamilton D'Oyly Lyon
- Scotland - John Skinner Wilson
- Scotland - Louis Greig
- England - H C Harrison
- England - J C Gibson
- England - A D Warrington-Morris
- England - A C Bolton
- England - Norman Wodehouse
- England - W E Mann
- Scotland - Cecil Abercrombie
- England - W B Hynes
- England - A H MacIlwaine
- Scotland - J L Boyd
- England - Francis Oakeley
- England - W. J. A. Davies
- England - A L Harrison
- England - Cecil Kershaw
- Ireland - C F Hallaran
- Scotland - Cecil MacKenzie
- Scotland - A E Thomson
- England - P B William-Powlett
- England - M S Bradby
- Ireland - H W V Stephenson
- Ireland - W F Browne

== Club honours ==
- Hampshire Cup winners (6): 1971, 1972, 1977, 1981, 1982, 1983
- Hampshire 1 champions (3): 1999–00, 2014–15, 2017–18
- Hampshire Plate winners: 2009

== See also ==
- Devonport Services Rugby Football Club
