= Charlie Amesbury =

English rugby union footballer

- Born: Charlie Amesbury; 8 April 1986 (age 40) Portsmouth, Hampshire, England
- Height: 1.83 m (6 ft 0 in)
- Weight: 95 kg (14 st 13 lb; 209 lb)
- School: Lord Wandsworth College
- University: University of Manchester

Rugby union career
- Position(s): Wing, Full back
- Current team: Bristol
Youth career
- Petersfield R.F.C.
Senior career
Years	Team	Apps	(Points)
2006–2009	Harlequins	8	(5)
2009–2011	Newcastle Falcons	17	(10)
2011–2013	Sale Sharks	28	(10)
2013–?	Bristol	45	(100)
- Correct as of 3 September 2012
National sevens team
Years	Team		Comps
2006	England		South Africa

Charlie Amesbury (born 8 April 1986 in Portsmouth) is a former rugby union footballer who last played professionally on the wing or full back for Bristol in the RFU Championship, and previously for Harlequins, Sale Sharks and Newcastle Falcons in the Aviva Premiership. He also played for England Sevens. Amesbury played for Cambridge University in The Varsity Match in 2016 and in 2017, when he scored a try and captained the side to victory over Oxford.

Amesbury started playing rugby at the age of six; playing mini-rugby at Petersfield R.F.C. He attended Lord Wandsworth College from the age of 13 and by the age of 15 was of a good enough standard to represent the Under 16's.

In 2004, Amesbury played full back for the London & South East Division and was selected for the England training group. Also in 2004 he played for England Under 18's and during the 2004/05 season played regularly for Quins in the Zurich A League. He made his First XV debut for Quins during the 2005–06 season; scoring twice in the 43–3 victory over Otley at the Stoop.

Amesbury was part of the England Sevens squad that competed in the 2006-07 IRB Sevens World Series.

Amesbury made his starting debut for Quins against Leeds at the beginning of the 2007–08 season. A Quins academy player, he was rewarded with a first team contract. At the end of the 2008–09 season he chose to move on due to the lack of game time at Quins and signed for Premiership side Newcastle Falcons.

During the 2011/12 season he played on from January 2012 whilst suffering from appendicitis, which was operated on in the Summer off season period.

During the 2013–14 season Bristol signed Amesbury from Sale Sharks to help their push for promotion for the remainder of the season. After losing in the playoff final against London Welsh he stayed on for the 2014–15 in the RFU Championship
