= Hampshire Rugby Football Union =

(England) Hampshire RFU
- Full name: Hampshire Rugby Football Union
- Union: RFU
- Founded: 1883; 143 years ago
- Region: Hampshire, Isle of Wight, Channel Islands
- Chairman: Mr Neil McRoberts
- CEO: Julie Greenslade
- President: Dr Ed Neville
- Coach(es): Tim Allen (Rugby Director); Rob Batley (County XV Team Manager); Mike Greenslade (Under 20s Team Manager); Sarah Mitchell (Under 18s Team Manager); Rob Batley (Under 17s Team Manager); Steve Walker (Under 16s Team Manager) David Ball (Under 15s Team Manager) Duncan Parker, Dean Lewis (Women's Senior Coaches)
Team kit

Official website
- www.hampshirerugby.co.uk

Hampshire Rugby Football Union is the governing body for rugby union in the county of Hampshire, England. It represent clubs sides not just from Hampshire but also from the Isle of Wight and the Channel Islands, who take part in many of the competitions organized by the Hampshire RFU.

== History ==
At the initiative of the Trojans Rugby Club a meeting was held on 13 April 1883 to discuss the formation of "The Hampshire County Rugby Football Union". In this inaugural season at least seven Trojans represented the County. The United Services proved to be the other early mainstay of the county side. In 1901 County activities had ceased. Once again, the Trojans, along with United Services Portsmouth RFC convened a meeting in 1910 at the Trojans Club for the purpose of forming a Rugby Football Union in Hampshire. Since then, with a notably strong side in the 1930s (drawn largely from the United Services) the county has won the County Championship twice, featuring in four finals. Their last appearance in the County Championship final was in 1962 although they did play in the County Championship Plate final in 2008 at Aldershot, beating Leicestershire 22-12.

== County side ==
=== Honours ===
The county side has been in the county championship cup final four times, winning the title on two occasions. They have also played in the Plate(shield) -now named Bill Beaumont County Championship final three times, winning on two appearances. Division 3 winners twice, runner up Division 2 final.

Year	Winners	Home team	Score	Away team	Venue	Notes
1926	Yorkshire	Yorkshire	15-14	Hampshire	Bradford	
1933	Hampshire	Hampshire	18-7	Lancashire	Boscombe	
1936	Hampshire	Northumberland	6-13	Hampshire	Gosforth	
1962	Warwickshire	Hampshire	6-11	Warwickshire	Twickenham	
2008	Hampshire	Hampshire	22-12	Leicestershire	Aldershot	Championship Plate
2016	Hampshire	Hampshire	33-11	Staffordshire	Twickenham	Championship Shield Division 3
2017	Leicestershire	Hampshire	9-37	Leicestershire	Twickenham	Bill Beaumont County Championship Division 2

=== Notable players for the County side ===
- (England) Jonny Wilkinson
- (Wales) Arthur Gould

== Affiliated clubs ==
There are currently 45 clubs affiliated with the Hampshire RFU, most of which have teams at both senior and junior level. The majority of clubs are in Hampshire but a number are based in the Isle of Wight or the Channel Islands as well as other counties such as Surrey.

- Aldershot & Fleet
- Alresford
- Alton
- Andover
- Basingstoke
- Bognor (Note: Bognor are based in West Sussex and are joint members of both Sussex RFU and Hampshire RFU.)
- Bournemouth (Note: Bournemouth are based in Dorset and are joint members of both Dorset & Wilts RFU and Hampshire RFU.)
- Camberley (Note: Camberley are based in Surrey and are joint members of both Surrey RFU and Hampshire RFU.)
- Chineham
- Eastleigh
- Ellingham & Ringwood
- Fareham Heathens
- Farnborough
- Farnham (Note: Farnham are based in Surrey and are joint members of both Surrey RFU and Hampshire RFU.)
- Fawley
- Fordingbridge
- Gosport & Fareham
- Guernsey (Note: Guernsey are based in the Channel Islands but belong to the Hampshire RFU.)
- Havant
- Hampshire Constabulary RFC
- Hook & Odiham
- Isle of Wight (Note: Isle of Wight RFC are based on the Isle of Wight but belong to the Hampshire RFU.)
- Jersey Reds (Note: Jersey Reds are based in the Channel Islands but belong to the Hampshire RFU.)
- Jersey United Banks (Note: Jersey United Banks are based in the Channel Islands but belong to the Hampshire RFU.)
- Kingsclere
- Locksheath Pumas
- Lymington Mariners
- Millbrook
- New Milton & District
- Overton
- Petersfield
- Portsmouth
- Romsey
- Ryde
- Sandown & Shanklin (Note: Sandown & Shanklin are based on the Isle of Wight but belong to the Hampshire RFU.)
- Scottish Exiles
- Southampton
- Tadley (Note: Tadley are based in Hampshire but are joint members of both Dorset & Wilts RFU and Hampshire RFU.)
- Tottonians
- Trojans
- U.S. Portsmouth
- Vectis
- Ventnor
- Winchester

== County club competitions ==
The Hampshire RFU currently runs the following club competitions for club sides based in Hampshire, the Isle of Wight and the Channel Islands:

=== Leagues ===
- Hampshire Premier – league at tier 9 of the English rugby union system
- Hampshire 1 – league at tier 10
- Hampshire 2 – league at tier 11

=== Cups ===
- Hampshire Cup – for club sides that typically play between tiers 6-7 of the English rugby union league system
- Hampshire Bowl – for clubs sides at tiers 8-9
- Hampshire Plate – for club sides at tiers 9-11

== See also ==
- London & SE Division
- English rugby union system
