= Basingstoke R.F.C. =

English rugby union club, based in Basingstoke, Hampshire

(England) Basingstoke
- Full name: Basingstoke Rugby Football Club
- Union: Hampshire RFU
- Founded: 1948; 78 years ago
- Location: Basingstoke, Hampshire, England
- Ground: Down Grange (Capacity: 2,500 (250 seats))
- Chairman: James Jagged
- President: Stephen Tristram
- Coach: Eric Liebenberg
- League: Counties 1 Hampshire
- 2024–25: 3rd
Team kit

Official website
- www.basingstokerfc.com

Basingstoke Rugby Football Club is a Rugby Union club based in Basingstoke, Hampshire, in southern England. The men's 1st XV currently plays in Counties 1 Hampshire - a league at level 7 of the English rugby union system - following their promotion from Counties 2 Hampshire at the end of the 2023–24 season.

== History ==
The club was formed in March 1948, with two matches being played during that season, and a full fixture list for two fifteens the following season. In the early days matches were played on Basingstoke Common and later at Whiteditch Field and several other grounds within the locality. A number of local hostelries provided the headquarters until 1958 when the Cricket Pavilion at Mays Bounty became the club's home until the move to Down Grange in 1971. The growth of the town resulted in a steady increase in Club strength, and there were three sides in 1963, four in 1966, five in 1970, and an occasional seventh team in 1971. During the seventies the club was one of the strongest in the county. Playing strength declined for a while in the early eighties, but the wise investments in a strong junior and youth section paid dividends.

The advent of the knock-out competitions and leagues was welcomed at Basingstoke. The club has won the Hampshire Cup ten times and runners-up four times. In 1993 and 1994 Basingstoke RFC reached the fourth round of the Pilkington Cup, losing to Harlequins and London Irish RFC respectively. When league rugby started in 1987/88 the club was entered into London Division 2 which they won that year, and the following year headed London Division 1, being promoted to National League 4 South (later to become League 5 South), in which they were runners-up two years running. A rather mixed performance in 1994/95 resulted in relegation to London Division 1. In 2008 the club was relegated to the London 2 South division. On two occasions Basingstoke's Sevens team has reached Twickenham and performed valiantly against first class opposition. On the second occasion they reached the final of the plate competition. The club and all the teams are fully supported by Bizz Radio Basingstoke, the local radio station in Basingstoke.

== Ground ==
The ground fund account was opened at the AGM in 1961 with a sum of £20 which was all the club could afford. During the late sixties fund raising and negotiations with Basingstoke and Deane Borough Council proceeded slowly. Eventually a ground lease was arranged at Down Grange. Building started in September 1970 and the Clubhouse was opened in January 1971. Once the project became a reality, fund raising improved dramatically, in addition a grant was obtained, and also a loan from the brewery. Two years later in 1973 two more changing rooms, a referees dressing room, a store and the spectator stand to the 1st XV pitch were added, together with other improvements largely to cope with the increasing number of players and supporters. In 1984 the President's Lounge was built which provided comfortably accommodation for members and their families. The club was still run entirely on a voluntary basis by members, however, in December 1988 in order to make greater use of the facilities and provide a better service for members, a full-time steward was employed and has been ever since.

One more major development took place in 1991, when extensions to provide a dining area, larger kitchen, office, shop and weight training room were built. Internal improvements also included a fully equipped medical room, a new central heating system and enlargement of the bar area. The current capacity at Down Grange is around 2,500 overall including 250 seats.

== Club Honours ==
- London Division 2 South champions (2): 1987–88, 2008–09
- Hampshire Cup winners (14): 1990, 1992, 1993, 1994, 1995, 1997, 2000, 2001, 2002, 2003, 2009, 2010, 2012, 2014
- London 1 v South West 1 promotion playoff winners: 2001–02
- London Division 1 champions: 1999–00
- London 1 (north v south) promotion playoff winners: 2012–13
- Hampshire Premier champions: 2018–19
