= Derek White (rugby union) =

Scotland international rugby union player

- Born: 30 January 1958 (age 68) Haddington, Scotland
- Height: 6 ft 4 in (1.93 m)

Rugby union career
- Position: No.8 / Flanker
Amateur team(s)
Years	Team	Apps	(Points)
- Dunbar
–	Haddington		
–	Gala		
–	London Scottish		
–	Petersfield		
Provincial / State sides
Years	Team	Apps	(Points)
- South of Scotland District
International career
Years	Team	Apps	(Points)
1982	Scotland 'B'	1	(0)
1982–92	Scotland	42	(44)
Coaching career
- Years: Team
- Petersfield (Player-coach)

Derek Bolton White (born 30 January 1958) is a former Scotland international rugby union player. His regular playing position are Flanker and Number 8.

== Early life ==
White was born on 30 January 1958 in Haddington, Scotland. He was educated at Dunbar Grammar School.

== Rugby Union career ==
=== Amateur career ===
During his playing career he was 6 ft 4 and 1/2 inches tall. He was once described as "a big bulky back-row with pace and a mean streak".

White played rugby for Dunbar, before moving to Haddington, and then Gala.

White moved to Petersfield, Hampshire, where he played for London Scottish until the mid-1990s. He then played for Petersfield.

=== Provincial career ===
White played for South of Scotland District.

=== International career ===
White played at Flanker for Scotland 'B' against Ireland 'B' on 7 February 1982.

White had 42 caps for Scotland, from 1982 to 1992, scoring 11 tries, 44 points on aggregate. He played at the 1987 Rugby World Cup and at the 1991 Rugby World Cup as well as being part of the squad that won the Grand Slam in the 1990 Five Nations Championship.

White was on the British & Irish Lions 1989 tour of Australia. White moved to Petersfield, Hampshire, where he played for London Scottish until the mid-1990s.

=== Coaching career ===
White was a player-coach at Petersfield and Marlow.
