= Cecil MacKenzie =

Scotland international rugby union player

- Born: Cecil James Granville MacKenzie; 26 February 1889 Ayr, Scotland
- Died: 7 December 1959 (aged 70)

Rugby union career
- Position: Forward
Amateur team(s)
Years	Team	Apps	(Points)
-	United Services Portsmouth		
International career
Years	Team	Apps	(Points)
1921	Scotland	1	

Cecil James Granville MacKenzie (26 February 1889 – 7 December 1959, Ayr) was a Scottish international rugby union player, who played for Scotland as a centre. He was capped once in 1921.
