= Walter Lapage =

England international rugby union player

Walter Lapage OBE
- Full name: Walter Neville Lapage
- Born: 5 February 1883 Nantwich, England
- Died: 17 May 1939 (aged 56) New Forest, England

Rugby union career
- Position: Three-quarter
International career
Years	Team	Apps	(Points)
1908	England	4	(6)

Walter Neville Lapage (5 February 1883 – 17 May 1939) was an English international rugby union player.

Born in Nantwich, Lapage attended Naval College straight out of school. He played rugby as a three-quarter for the Royal Navy and United Services. In 1908 Lapage was capped four times for England. He scored tries in both of his first two matches, playing as a centre, then got moved to the wing when Henry Vassall came into the side.

Lapage served on HMS Tiger during the Battle of Jutland and at the time of his retirement had command of HMS Hood, which was then the largest warship in the world.

== See also ==
- List of England national rugby union players
