= Petersfield R.F.C. =

English rugby union club, based in Petersfield

Petersfield RFC
- Full name: Petersfield Rugby Football Club
- Union: Hampshire RFU
- Nickname: The Rams
- Founded: 1927; 99 years ago
- Location: Petersfield, Hampshire, England
- Region: Hampshire
- Ground: Penns Place (Capacity: 1,500)
- Chairman: Stuart Barden
- CEO: Rob Mocatta, Hon Secretary
- President: Clive Waller
- Director of Rugby: Matt McLean
- Captain: Dan Sargent
- League: Regional 2 South Central
- 2025–26: 5th
1st kit	2nd kit

Official website
- www.pitchero.com/clubs/petersfield

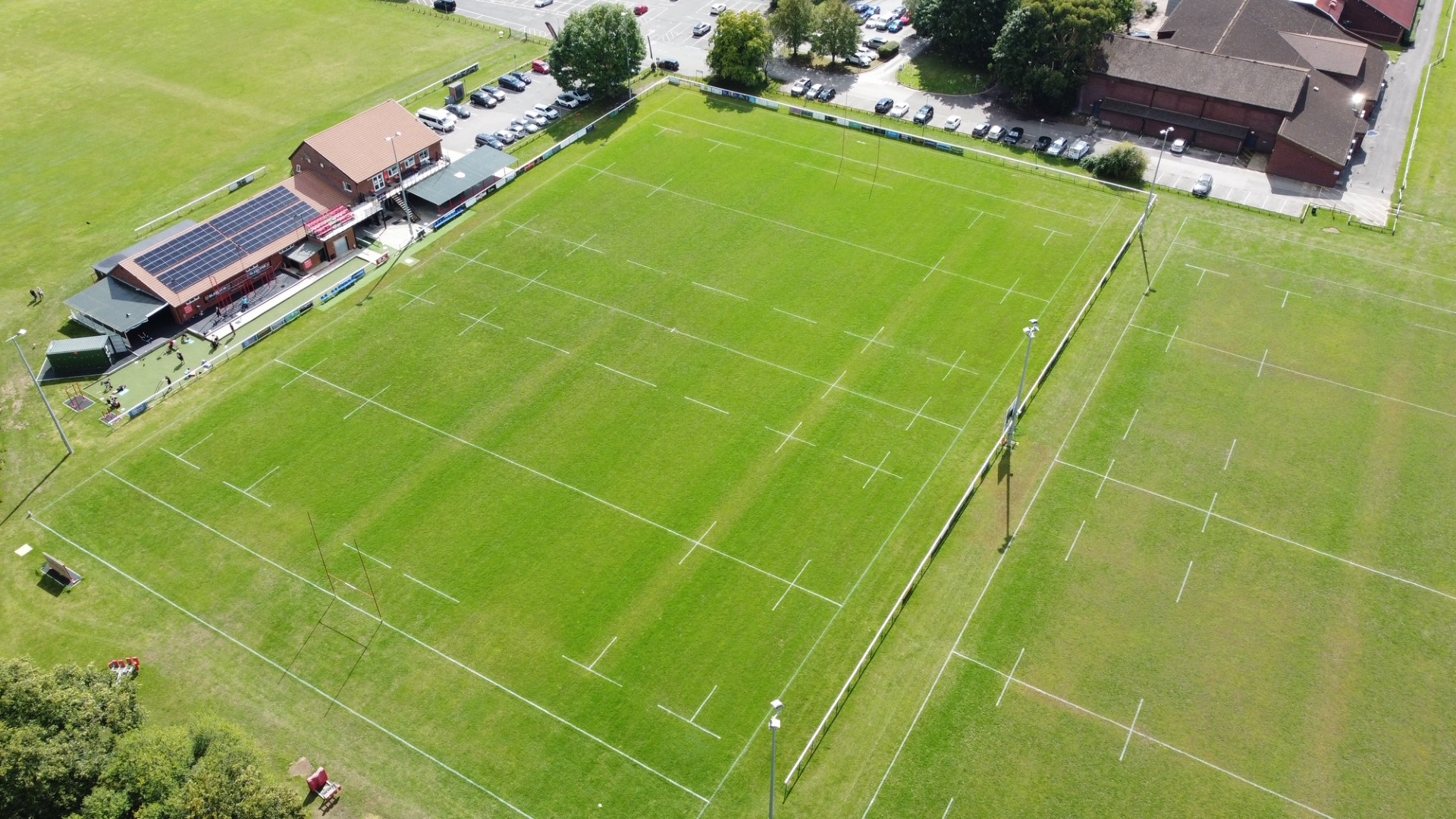
Penns Place - Petersfield RFC

Petersfield Rugby Football Club is a rugby union club based in the town of Petersfield, Hampshire, England. The men's first XV currently compete in Regional 2 South Central – a league at the sixth tier of the English rugby union system – following the club's promotion from Counties 1 Hampshire at the end of the 2023–24 season. There are also men's 2nd XV and 3rd XV, both of which play in the Hampshire regional leagues.

== History ==
The club was formed in 1927, at the instigation of Frank Guy, a former pupil of Churcher's College. Affiliated to the Hampshire Union in the same year, the club became known for both sporting and social activity. In that first year, its vice-presidents included five doctors, two clergymen and two ladies. Petersfield’s long reputation as a highly hospitable venue for sport was rapidly established. By 1934 the club was running two teams and gained its first county honour when G.E.Twine was capped to play against Kent (Hampshire won 6–3). In those days players were “carded” the post being sufficiently rapid and reliable to ensure that players were aware that they had been selected for the next match. In 1938 the club changed its colours to its well-known scarlet and white hoop.

The club affiliated itself to the Rugby Football Union in 1948 and in that year moved to Love Lane Stadium. However, as the club grew, the need was soon recognised to provide a more permanent home in the town. Plans were well advanced to build a separate clubhouse at Love Lane, when the Town Council decided to develop the Penns Place site at the edge of the town. The club moved to Penns Place in 1979; the first clubhouse was a wooden structure which was irreparably damaged in the Great Storm of 1987.

In 1989 Frank Guy, the founder member, officially opened the current clubhouse with a celebratory match between a Petersfield XV and Derek White’s Invitation XV being played.

At the beginning of the 2006–07 season, a new changing room block was opened. This development was made necessary by the loss of the changing facility in the Taro Centre, which had been a key assumption in the design of the 1979 and 1989 clubhouses. After several years where portable cabins were used for changing, the new development was achieved through the significant support of the Rugby Football Foundation, grants and fundraising by Club members.

Ex-Petersfield player Tim Rodber is one of the club's best known old boys, having gone on to be capped for England, and the British and Irish Lions. Ex-Scotland and British and Irish Lions player Derek White is another high profile international with strong links to PRFC having been involved in coaching the senior players and occasionally running out for the 1st XV.

The club has a youth setup and has stated intentions to create a centre of excellence to develop players.[citation needed] Players who have come through the club's youth system include former Harlequin F.C., Newcastle Falcons, Sale Sharks, and Bristol Rugby winger Charlie Amesbury; England Women Red Rose and Harlequins fullback, Fiona Pocock, Joe Atkinson, capped by England U18s and England Students, who joined Wasps RFC for the 2018–19 season before moving to Bedford Blues and lock Will Spencer (rugby union), formerly of Leicester Tigers, Bath Rugby and Northampton Saints.

Dr James Alder became Director of Rugby at the beginning of the 2016-17 season, leading the 1st XV to a league and cup double.

The club was joined following the 2017–18 season by Bernard James Rhodes as Director of Rugby, despite his limited experience in the Hampshire leagues. Unfortunately the club struggled under the new guidance and were relegated the following year. The 2019–20 season saw further changes with a new head coach in Jason Ford and a new forwards coach in ex Portsmouth RFC Head Coach, Jim Pearce. Promotion was achieved to London South West 3. In the same season, Petersfield were also fortunate enough to be joined by ex Bath and Wales Exiles centre Tom Cheeseman. Petersfield went undefeated in cantering to the Counties 1 Hampshire title in 2023–24, amassing 98 points from 19 victories - to take their place the Regional 2 South Central, finishing fifth in their inaugural campaign at Level 6.

The club provides rugby for an age range of 6 to 60 and has seen development in its Youth Section. The senior playing strength is 80-players, and there are upwards of 450 Mini, Youth and Colt playing members. Parents, and non-playing members, including Vice-Presidents, make up the rest of the membership.

== Recent performances ==
In the RFU English Clubs Championship, Petersfield has achieved the following outcomes in recent seasons:

Season	Division (level)	Result
2007–08	London 4 South West (8)	8th/12
2008–09	London 4 South West (8)	12th/12, relegated
2009–10	Hampshire Division 1 (9)	2nd/12, promoted
2010–11	London 3 South West (8)	9th/12 but relegated due to restructuring of London 3 South West Division
2011–12	Hampshire Division 1 (9)	5th/12
2012–13	Hampshire Division 1 (9)	11th/12, relegated
2013–14	Hampshire Division 2 (10)	1st/12, promoted
2014–15	Hampshire Division 1 (9)	6th/10 (league should have had 11 teams; Team Solent withdrew)
2015–16	Hampshire Division 1 (9)	9th/11
2016–17	Hampshire Division 1 (9)	1st/11, promoted
2017–18	London South West 3 (8)	9th/12
2018–19	London South West 3 (8)	11th/12, relegated to Hampshire Premiership
2019–20	Hampshire Premiership (9)	1st/13, promoted.
2021–22	London South West 3 (8)	2/12, expected promotion but leagues were restructured
2022–23	Counties 1 Hampshire (7)	10/12
2023–24	Counties 1 Hampshire (7)	1/11, won 19, drew 1, promoted
2024–25	Regional 2 South Central (6)	5/12
2025–26	Regional 2 South Central (6)	5/12. Lost to Winchester in first round of Regional 1 play-offs

(Competition results from England Rugby)

== Honours ==
- Hampshire 2 champions (2): 1988–89, 2013–14
- Hampshire Premier champions (3): 2001–02, 2016–17, 2019–20
- Hampshire Bowl winners (2): 2006, 2007
- Hampshire 1 v Surrey 1 promotion playoff winners: 2009–10
- Hampshire Plate winners: 2017
- Counties 1 Hampshire winners: 2024

== See also ==
- List of English rugby union teams
