= Trojans Rugby Club =

English rugby union club, based in Eastleigh, Hampshire

(England) Trojans
- Full name: Trojans Rugby
- Union: Hampshire RFU
- Nickname: T’s
- Founded: 1874; 152 years ago
- Location: Eastleigh, Hampshire, England
- Ground: Stoneham Lane
- Chairman: Duncan Parker
- Coach: Neal Haworth
- League: Counties 1 Hampshire
- 2024–25: 11th (relegated to Counties 2 Hampshire)

Official website
- www.pitchero.com/clubs/trojans/

The Trojans Club, based at Stoneham Lane, Eastleigh, Hampshire, was formed in 1874, initially as a rugby union club. The men's rugby 1st XV currently play in Counties 2 Hampshire – a league at the eighth level of the English rugby union system, while the men's 2nd XV play in the Hampshire Leagues.

There are now four active sections, rugby, cricket, hockey, and squash, covering all ages from under-8 to seniors and both men and women, boys and girls. During its history, the Trojans Club has produced many county and international players, including Anthony Allen.

== Honours ==
- Hampshire 2 champions: 1992–93
- Hampshire 1 v Surrey 1 promotion play-off winners: 2000–01
- Hampshire 1 champions (2): 2004–05, 2006–07
- Hampshire Bowl winners: 2009, 2017
- London 2 (south-east v south-west) promotion play-off winners: 2010–11
