= William Hynes (rugby union) =

England international rugby union player

William Hynes CBE DSO
- Full name: William Bayard Hynes
- Born: 6 April 1889 Portsea, England
- Died: 2 March 1968 (aged 78) Chichester, England

Rugby union career
- Position: Forward
International career
| Years | Team | Apps | (Points) |
| 1912 | England | 1 | (0) |

William Bayard Hynes (6 April 1889 – 2 March 1968) was an English international rugby union player.

A Royal Navy officer, Hynes played rugby for United Services and was capped as a forward for England against France at Paris during the 1912 Five Nations Championship.

Hynes was decorated with a Distinguished Service Order (DSO) and made a Commander of the Order of the British Empire (CBE) for his military service.

From 1931 to 1933, Hynes served as director of Naval Intelligence for the Royal Canadian Navy.

== See also ==
- List of England national rugby union players
