= Gosport and Fareham R.F.C. =

English rugby union club, based in Gosport, Hampshire

(England) Gosport and Fareham
- Full name: Gosport and Fareham Rugby Football Club
- Union: Hampshire RFU
- Founded: 1946; 80 years ago
- Location: Gosport, Hampshire, England
- Ground: Gosport Park
- League: Counties 1 Hampshire
- 2024–25: 4th

Official website
- www.gosportrugby.club

Gosport and Fareham R.F.C. is a rugby union club located in Gosport, Hampshire, England, with home games and training taking place at Gosport Park on Dolphin Crescent. The men's first XV currently play in Counties 1 Hampshire (a league at level 7 of the English rugby union system).

== History / Background ==
Gosport and Fareham R.F.C. was founded in 1946. In 2004 the club built a new clubhouse at a cost of £800,000 funded by Sport England and various Councils. While the 1st XV play in the London 2 South West, the 2nd XV play in the Hampshire Merit One league and the 3rd XV play in friendly matches but are looking to return to competitive rugby. The club is a community rugby club and has a very active mini youth section from under-6 tounder-12 (school year 7, along with youth teams under-U13 to under-16 (school year 11). There is also colts team (under-17to-under-18).

== Honours ==
- Hampshire 1 champions (2): 1987–88, 1993–94 (Note: Both Hampshire 1 titles were won by parent club Gosport RFC.)
- Hampshire Plate winners: 1993
- London 2 South West champions (2): 1999–00, 2011–12
- London 2 (south-east v south-west) promotion play-off winners (2): 2000–01, 2013–14
- Hampshire Bowl winners: 2010
- Hampshire Cup winners: 2011
- London Division 3 South West champions: 2009–10
