= Portsmouth RFC =

English rugby union club, based in Portsmouth, Hampshire

(England) Portsmouth R.F.C
- Full name: Portsmouth Rugby Football Club
- Union: Hampshire RFU
- Founded: 1886; 140 years ago
- Location: Portsmouth, Hampshire, England
- Ground(s): The Rugby Camp, Norway Road, Hilsea
- Chairman: Jon Whitehouse, Vice-Chairmen Steve Cameron & Mike Caspall
- President: Nigel Morgan
- Coach(es): Matt Wake, Dan Roberts, Chris Jones/ Mark Witcher (Women’s squad)
- Captain: Club - Lee Chandler 1st XV - Max Clarke
- Most caps: Ian French
- Top scorer: Neil Styles, Simon Morgan
- League: Counties 1 Hampshire
- 2024–25: 7th

Official website
- portsmouthrugbyclub.co.uk

Portsmouth Rugby Football Club (PRFC) is a rugby union club located in Portsmouth, England and based at the Rugby Camp, Norway Road, Hilsea. The club's 1st XV currently play in Counties 1 Hampshire, a league at level 7 of the English rugby union system, while the 2nd XV play in Counties 3 Hampshire at level 9. The women’s 1st XV play in Championship 2 SW, tier 3 of women’s rugby.

== History ==
PRFC was formed in December 1886 from an amalgamation of two of the leading seven local clubs in the Portsmouth area. The club grew strongly over the next 15 years with a crowd of 7000 attending their match with Devonport Albion RFC. However it suffered a considerable setback in 1901 when due to a cash crisis the club folded at the end of the season. The Club restarted in 1909 and began to attempt to retrieve its former status. After an enforced hiatus due to World War I the club restarted slowly but developed over time with the club acquiring a permanent ground firstly at Paulsgrove and then moving to Rat Lane just behind their present location.

The club remained in this location until World War II when the club was stopped for the duration of the war. After the end of the hostilities Portsmouth was left with no ground, as Rat Lane had been taken over by the War Office, and found temporary accommodation at a pitch in Denmead with changing rooms being provided by the Fox and Hounds Public House.

It slowly rebuilt a good reputation and attracted a number of high level players including a future Welsh and an Irish International. Matches depended upon the generosity of the local council who provided a pitch at Alexandra Park.

In the mid-1950s the local council mooted a ground share on a 50/50 basis with Portsmouth Football Club at a location behind the Authority Central Depot which had previously been a greyhound track. However, despite local volunteers' efforts to provide drainage to the site this was ultimately unsuccessful and the ground share never came about.

The club finally had a permanent clubhouse and two pitches in Copnor but due to drainage issues this was sold and the club became nomadic for the next few years with various bars doubling up as a clubhouse.

In 1965–66 the club moved to its current location at the rugby camp in Hilsea behind what had been its original ground in Rat Lane. A clubhouse was built by the members after considerable negotiation with the Ministry of Defence who owned the rugby camp at the time opening in 1975.

== Honours ==
- London 3 South West champions (2): 1993–94, 2000–01
- London 2 South champions: 2005–06
- Hampshire Cup winners: 2013
- Hampshire Bowl winners: 2018

== Current club ==
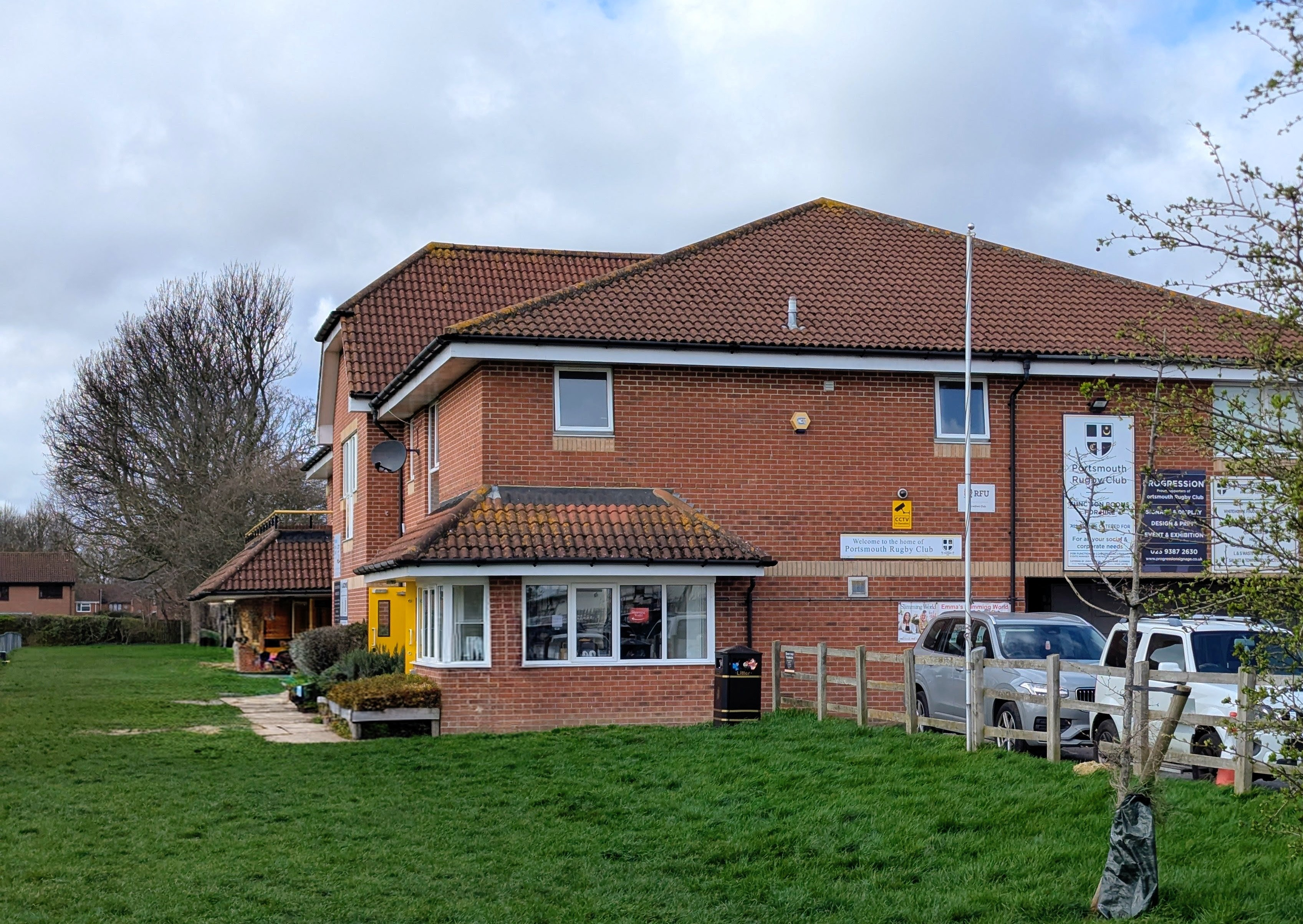
The clubhouse of Portsmouth Rugby club

PRFC now has three senior men's teams; a colts; a veterans team; three women's teams (including under-16s); a large and thriving junior and mini section. Portsmouth's first XV are currently playing in Counties 1 Hampshire captained by Max Clarke. The club is run from a purpose-built clubhouse which opened in 2000 with full disabled access.
