= Bedhampton =

Village in Hampshire, England

Coordinates: 50.85545°N 1.00234°W

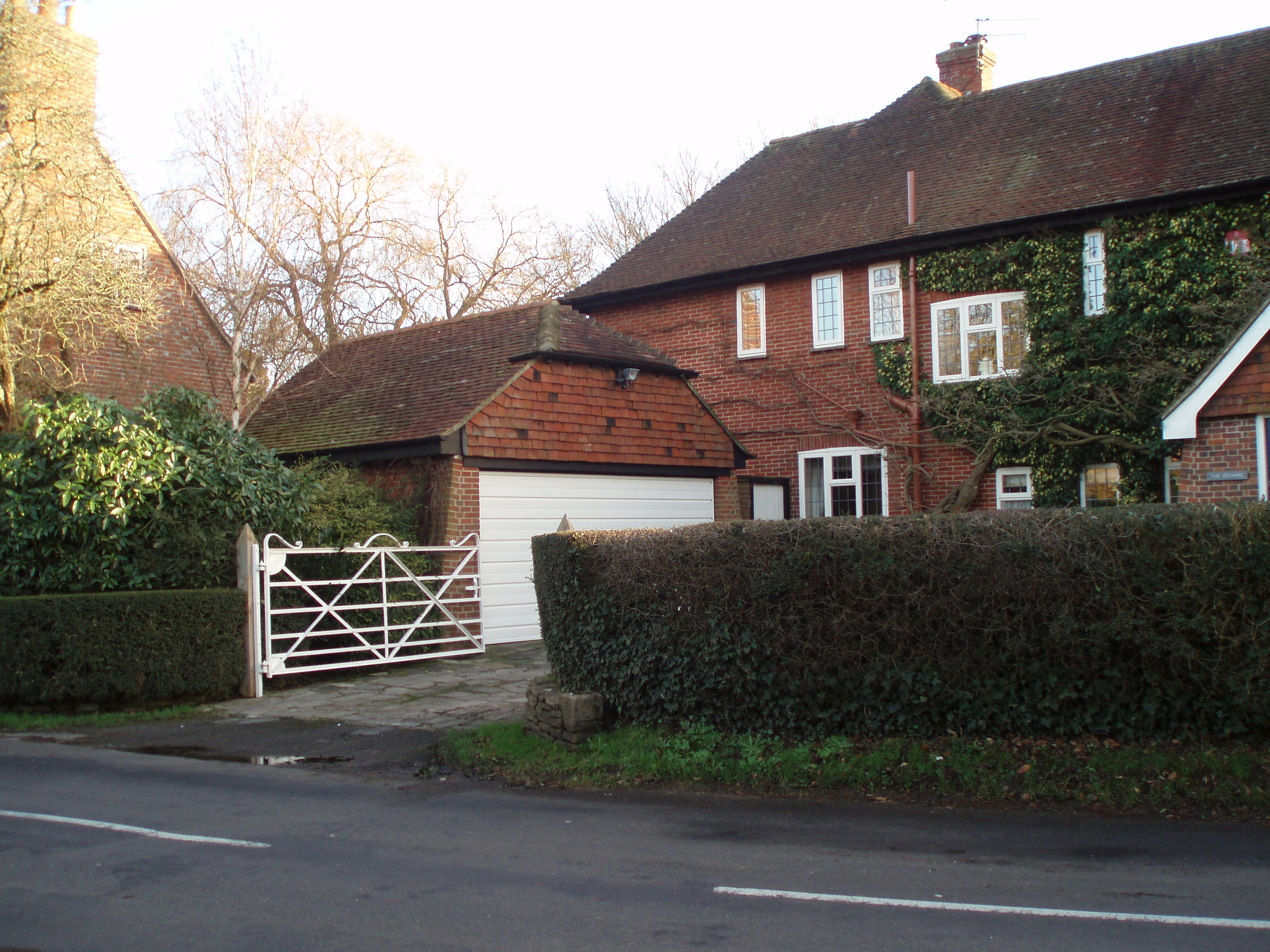
- An older style house in Old Bedhampton

- Location within Hampshire
- Population: 8,835 (2011.Ward)
- OS grid reference: SU703067
- District: Havant
- Shire county: Hampshire
- Region: South East
- Country: England
- Sovereign state: United Kingdom
- Post town: Havant
- Postcode district: PO9
- Police: Hampshire and Isle of Wight
- Fire: Hampshire and Isle of Wight
- Ambulance: South Central
- UK Parliament: Havant

Bedhampton is a former village, and now suburb, located in the borough of Havant, Hampshire, England. It is located at the northern end of Langstone Harbour and at the foot of the eastern end of Portsdown Hill.

Early mentions of Bedhampton are recorded in the ninth century, and the village was mentioned in the Domesday Book of 1086.

Modern Bedhampton has a railway station, with regular services to Portsmouth, Brighton, and London, and less frequent services to Southampton, Bristol, and South Wales. The A27 and the A3(M) pass through the south-west part of Bedhampton. There is a community centre in Bedhampton village which has two coffee mornings per week to address potential community isolation.

== Housing ==
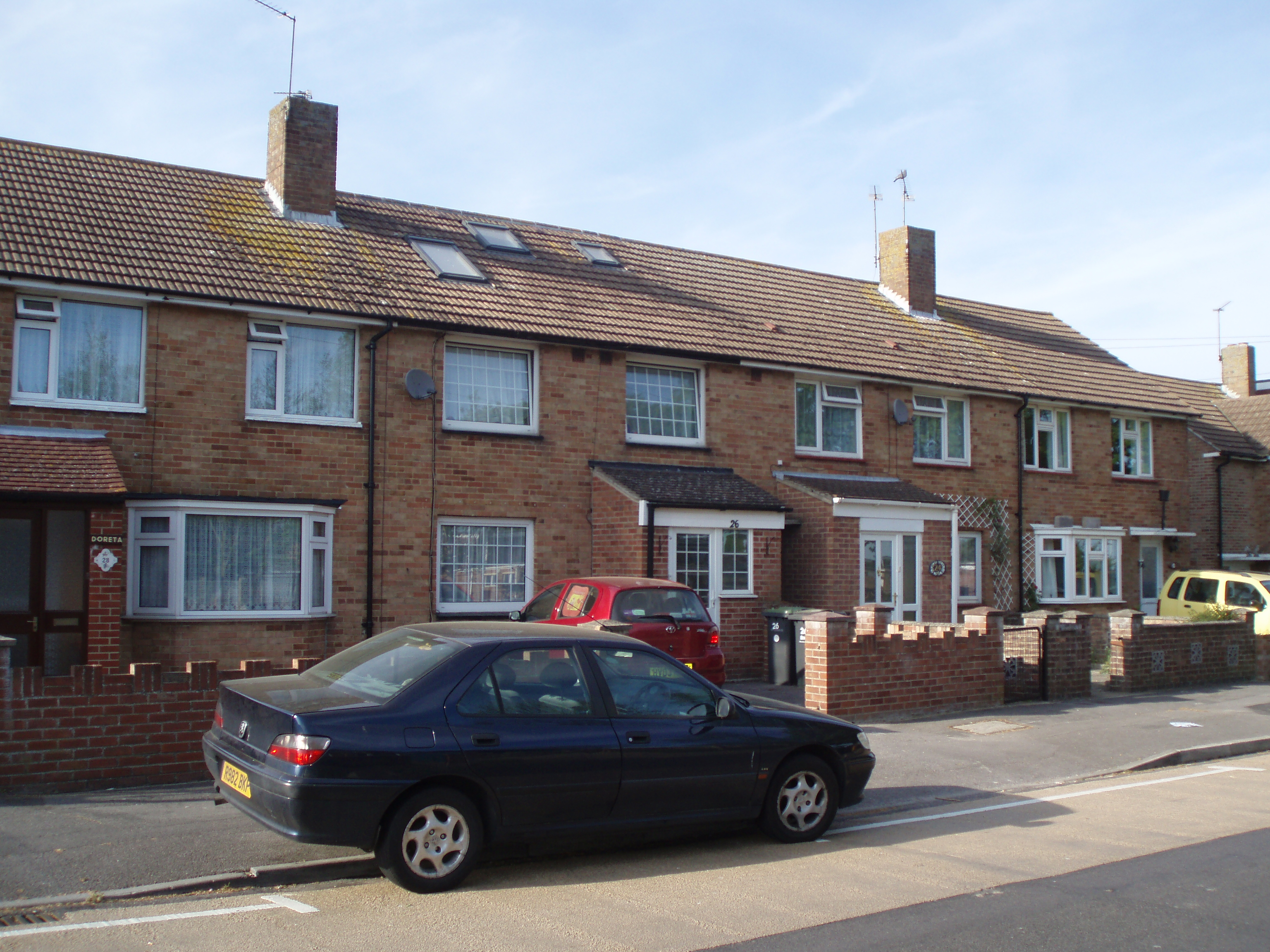
Municipal Housing, some now privately owned

Bedhampton has a mixture of older houses, many (but not all) in what is known as Old Bedhampton; post-war municipal housing at Stockheath; built in the late 50s and 60s at the southern end of the Leigh Park estate, a significant proportion of which is now privately owned; and a range of private housing, largely semi-detached.

== Schools ==
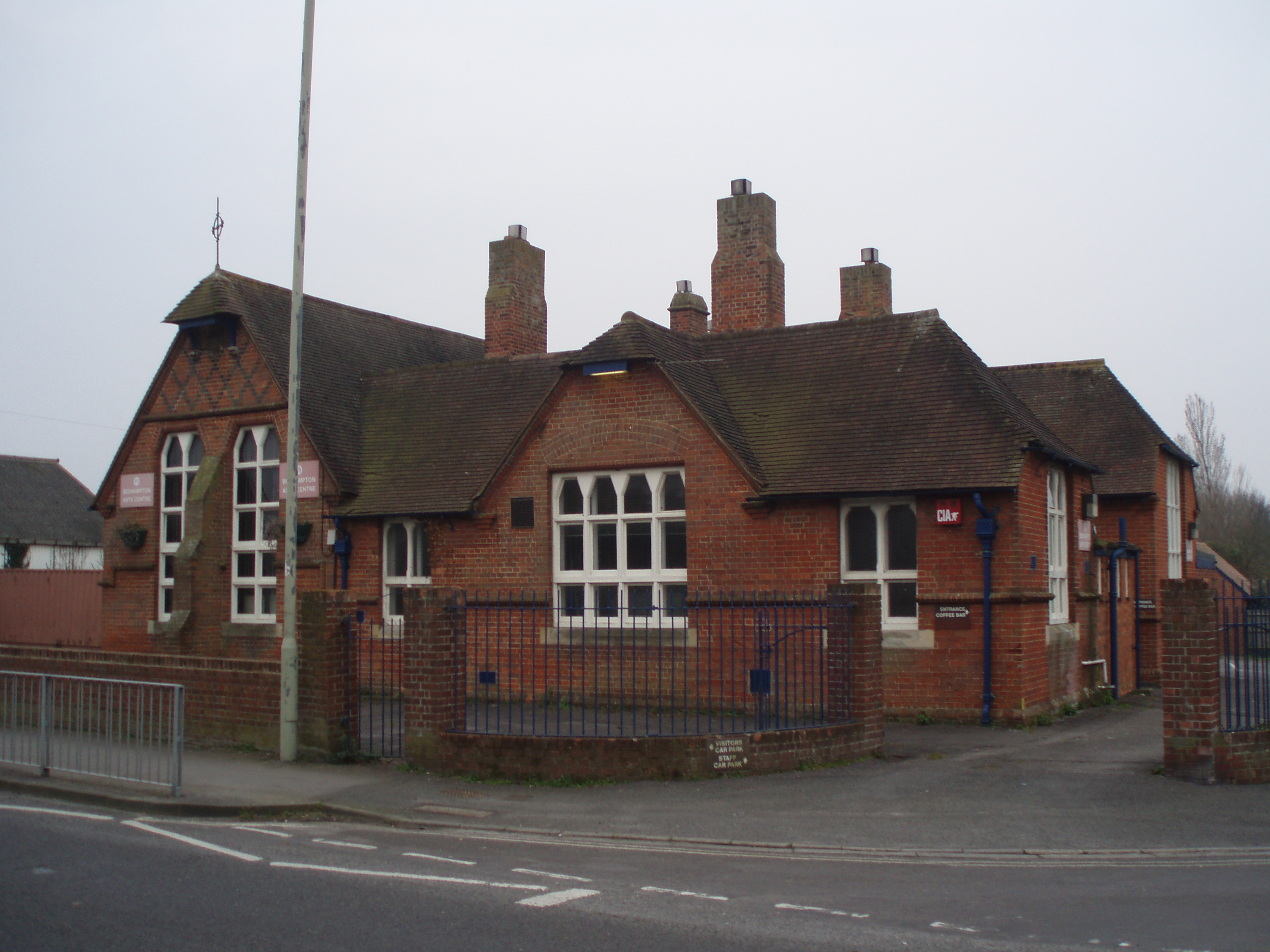
The Old School 1868–1985

The first school in Bedhampton was built on the corner of Bedhampton Road and King's Croft Lane. Miss Dust was the original mistress, serving at the school until 1876. The first page in her log book notes that she had to "reprove a boy for fighting". Scrutiny of the logbook suggests that Miss Dust was frequently visited by the squire, Mr Stone, and the rector, Rev Daubiney.

The next occupant of the school house, Mrs Dugdale, was to forge an association with the school which would last 46 years (Smith 1968). Mrs Dugdale (until 1902) and her daughter, Miss Dugdale (until 1922) were the first two in a long line of long serving head teachers, continued by Mrs Smith (1948 until 1975), Mrs Carrick (1975–94), Mrs Rowley (1994–2007) Mrs Jones (2007–2019) and now Miss Townshend.

After World War Two, school places were at a premium and extra places were created by turning the former HMS Daedalus III Naval Camp into Stockheath Primary School. Stockheath Naval Camp was two miles north where Great Copse Drive is now.

In 1974 Hampshire County Council decided to split the primary intake, and a new school for the older children was built on land immediately south of Hooks Lane Recreation Ground, and named Bidbury Middle School. A long campaign began to move the newly created Bedhampton First School to the new site too. This eventually happened in February 1985 when Bedhampton and Stockheath First schools amalgamated to become Bidbury First School, renamed Bidbury Infant School in 1994.

Just across the recreation ground is a Roman Catholic Primary School, St Thomas More's.

== Parks ==
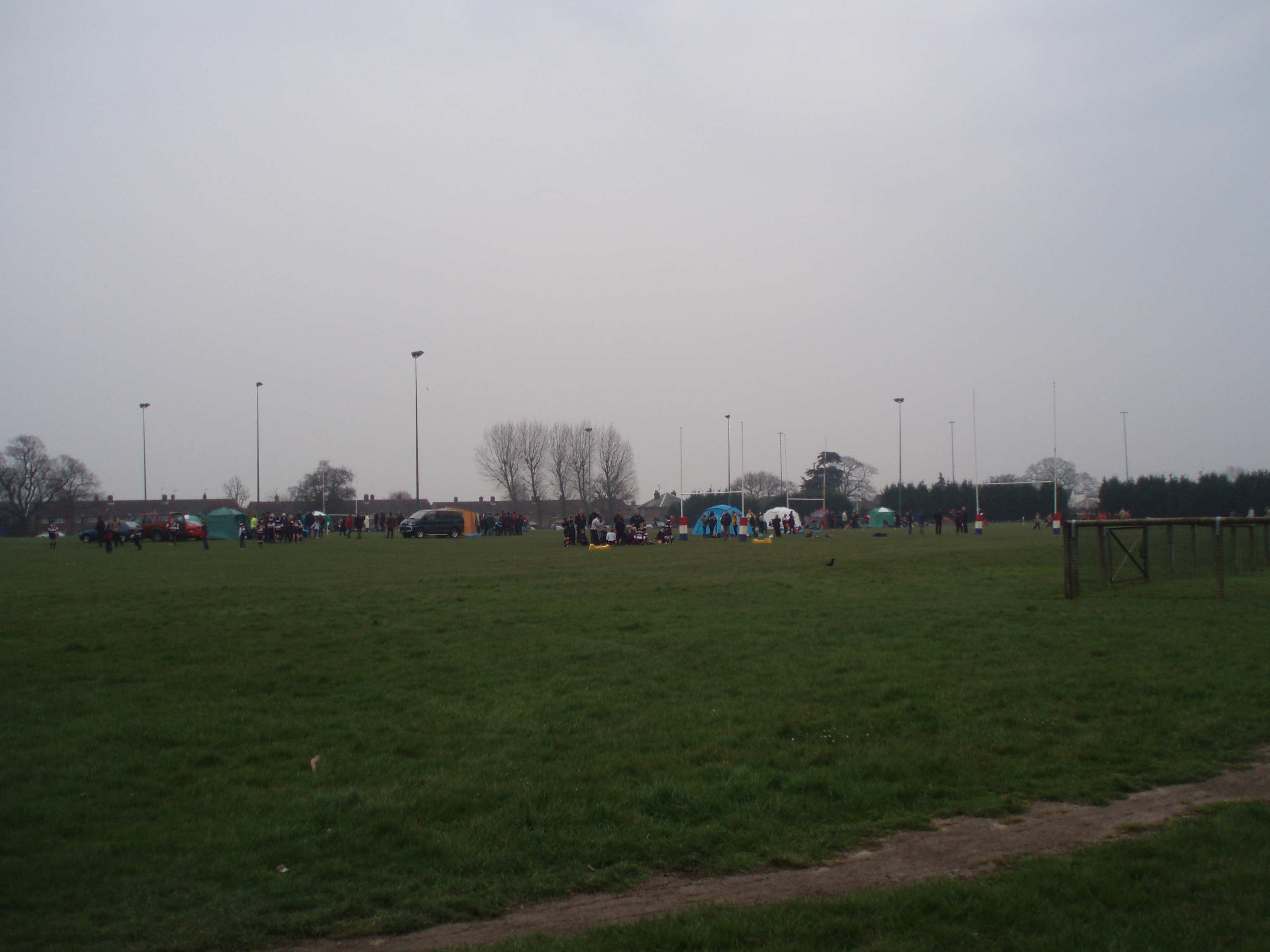
Hooks Lane

The Hermitage Stream Walk runs to the north of the parish, from New Road in the east to Purbrook Way in the west. Havant Borough Council have prioritised the environmental well-being of the habitat, and erected signs and information panels to highlight its importance. In the centre of Bedhampton is a large open space bounded by Hooks Lane, part of which is home to Havant RFC.

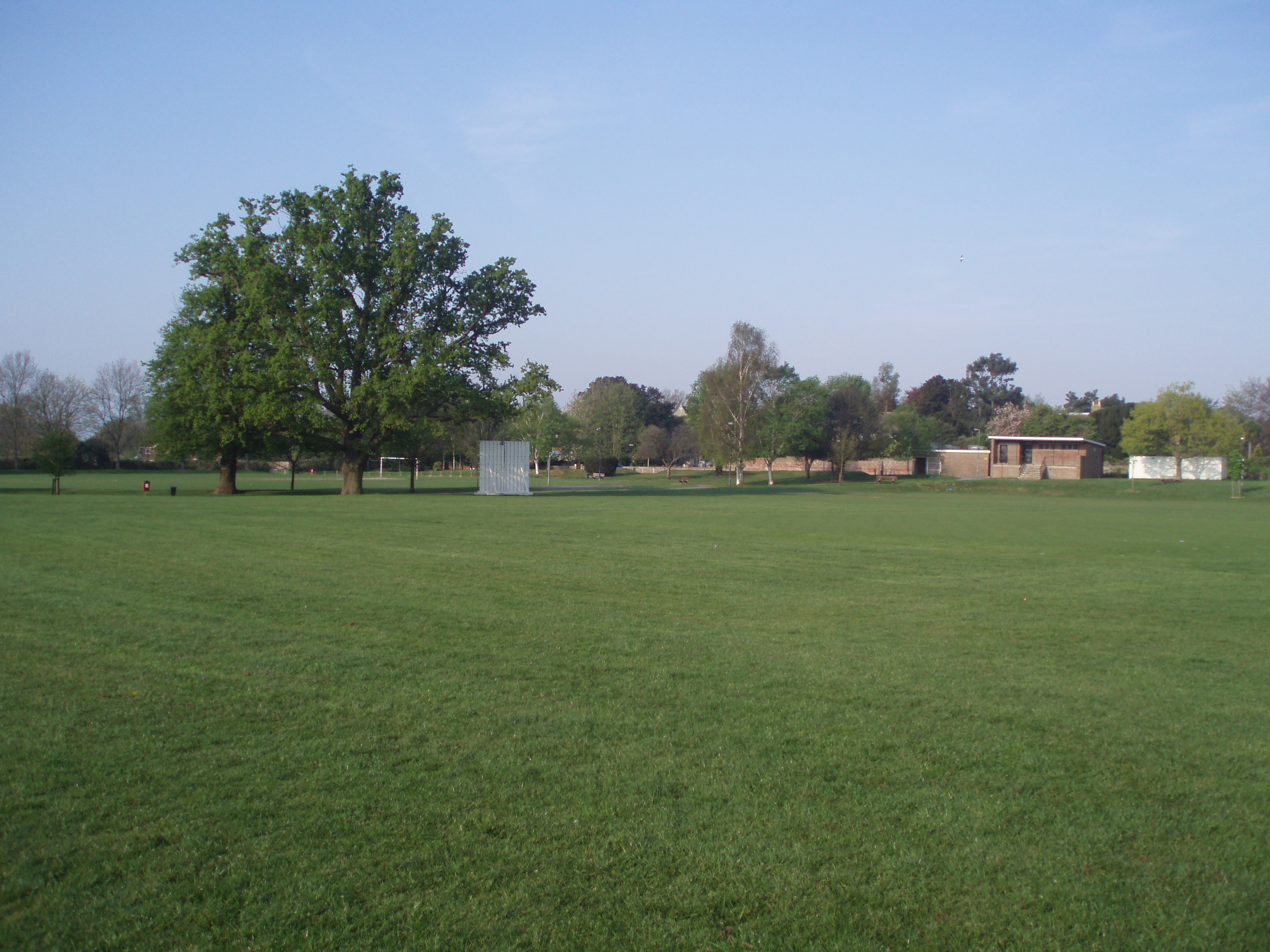
Bidbury Mead

To the south of Bedhampton Road is Bidbury Mead, a large tree-ringed recreation ground – home to Bedhampton Mariners Cricket Club and Bedhampton Bowling Club. The locality borders onto Old Bedhampton, the area around St Thomas the Apostle parish church. The fourth, and least known, space in Bedhampton is Scratchface Recreation Ground, situated to the west of the village within the parish boundary.

== Churches ==
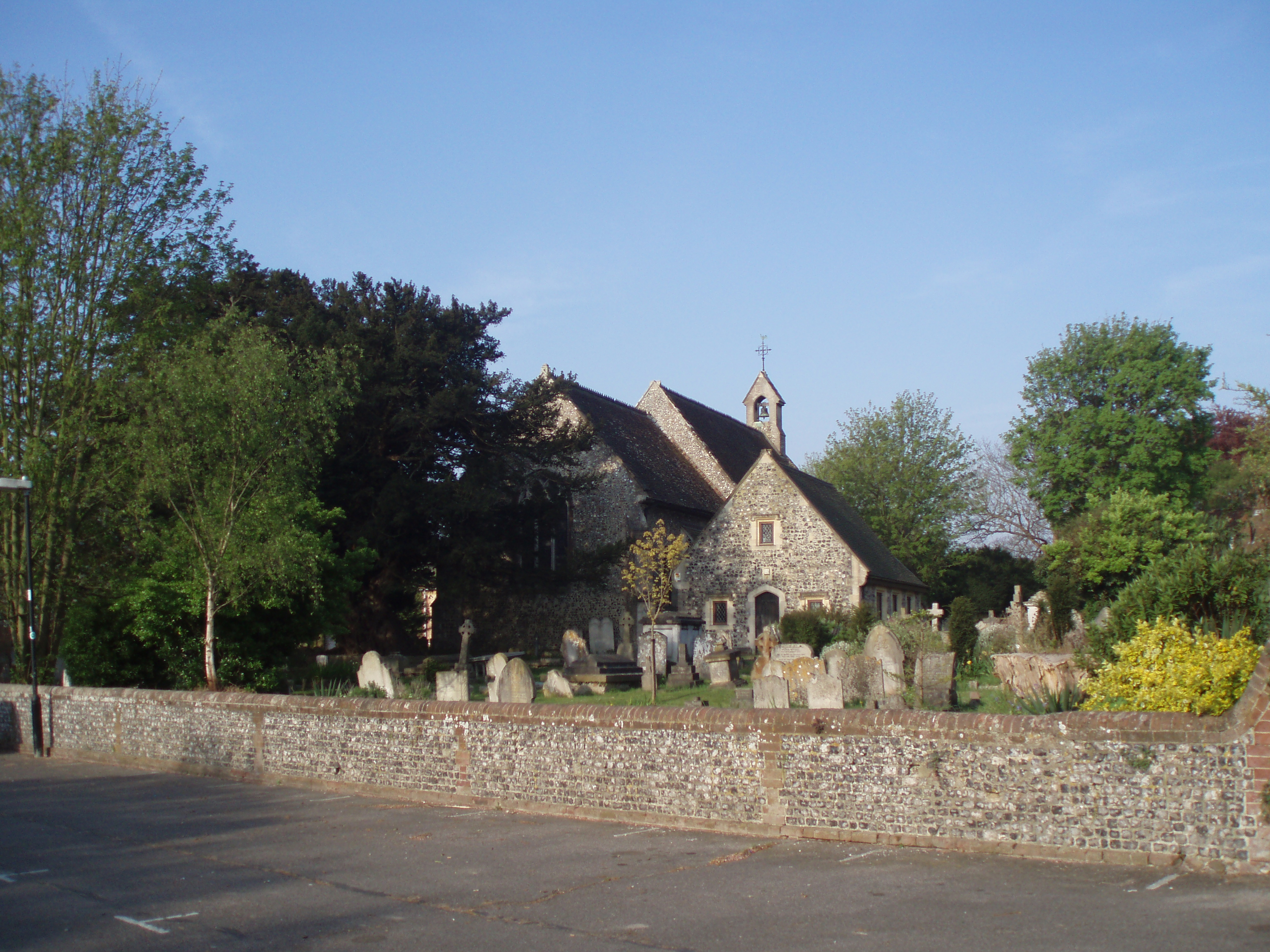
Parish Church of St Thomas The Apostle

Some include St Joseph’s R.C. Church here (because of its proximity to Bedhampton railway station) but most do not.

There has been a church in Bedhampton since 1086. The present parish church, St Thomas The Apostle, situated in Old Bedhampton, dates from the 12th century. In 1953 a church centre was built, and dedicated to St Nicholas. There are also a Methodist church, a modern building in Hulbert Road replacing an earlier primitive chapel by the station, and a Gospel Hall, built between 1901 and 1922 with funds provided by local benefactor Miss Meiklam.

== History ==
Botanist Lady Anne Brewis has commented on the different kinds of trees and flowers in the area. The author of Jane's Fighting Ships, Fred T. Jane, lived in Bedhampton and founded the first Bedhampton Scout troop.

In 1931 the civil parish had a population of 1411. On 1 April 1932 the parish was abolished and merged with Havant and Rowlands Castle. It is now in the unparished area of Havant and Waterloo.

== Bibliography ==
- Smith, M 1968 Bedhampton School Centenary History (copy lodged at Havant Museum)
- Hind, R.W. 2003 The Naval Camps of Bedhampton, Havant and Leigh Park ISBN 0-9546160-0-6
