= United Services Recreation Ground =

Sports ground in Portsmouth, England

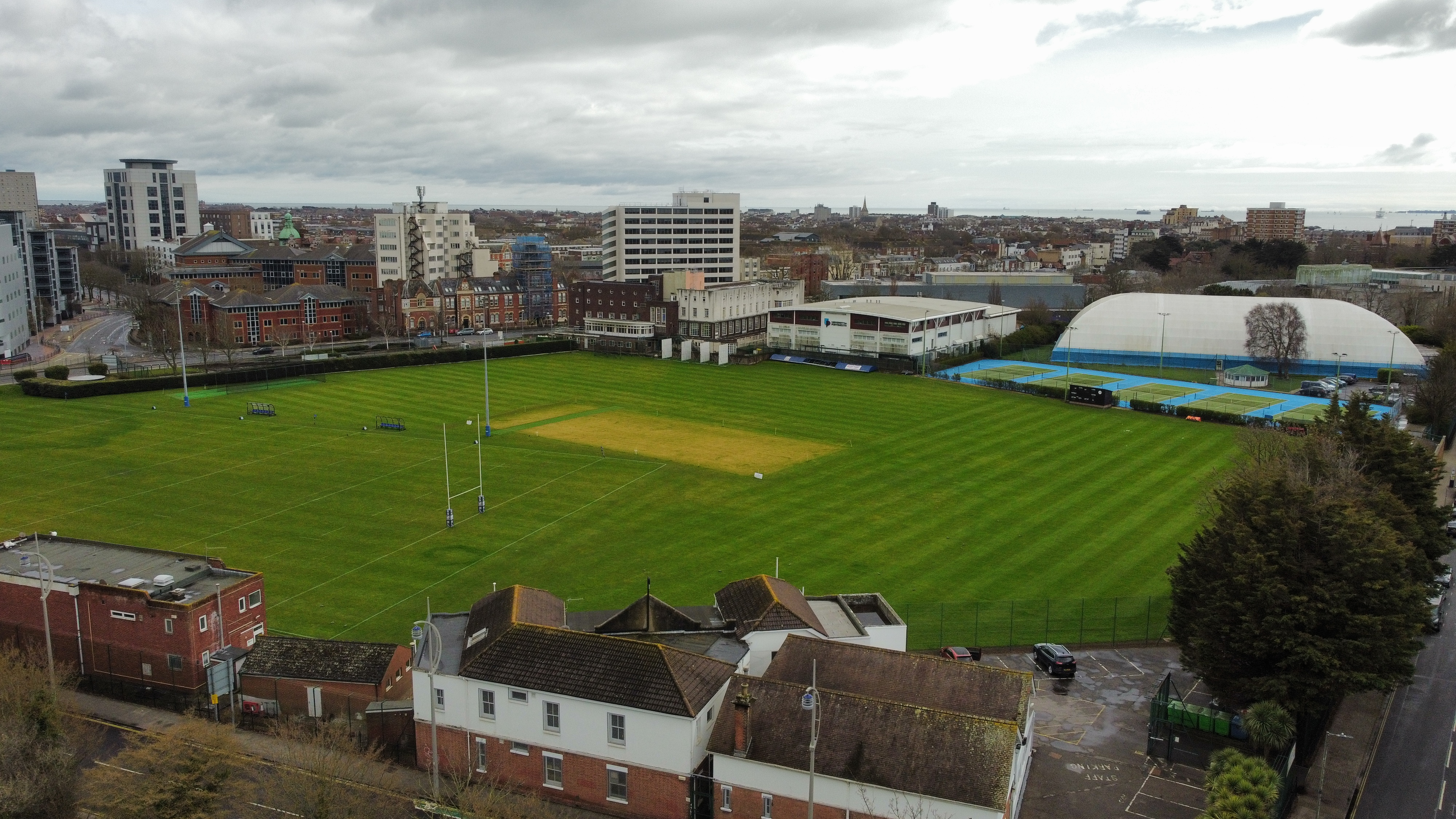

Ground information
- Location: Portsmouth, Hampshire
- Coordinates: 50.7959°N 1.0973°W
- Establishment: c. 1852
- Capacity: 8,000
- End names
- Railway End; Officer's Club End

Team information
Hampshire	(1882–2000)
Royal Artillery (Portsmouth) F.C.	(1894–1899)
United Services RFC	(1882–present)
- As of 28 December 2011; Source: Ground profile

The United Services Recreation Ground is a sports ground situated in Burnaby Road, Portsmouth, Hampshire, England. The ground is also bordered to the north by Park Road, along which the railway line to Portsmouth Harbour and Gunwharf Quays overlooks the ground, and to the east by Anglesea Road. The southern end of the ground is dominated by the Officer's Club building, which overlooks the ground. The ground is owned by The Crown. A multitude of sports have been played at the ground, including cricket, rugby, association football and hockey. The ground was used by Hampshire County Cricket Club from 1882 to 2000, serving as one of three home grounds used during this period, alongside the County Ground, Southampton, and Dean Park, Bournemouth. United Services Portsmouth Cricket Club currently play at the ground. The ground is used in its dual capacity as a rugby venue by United Services Portsmouth Rugby Football Club, who have played there since 1882. The Royal Navy Rugby Union also use the ground for their home matches. The end names are the Railway End to the north and the Officer's Club End to the south.

== History ==
=== Background and early history ===
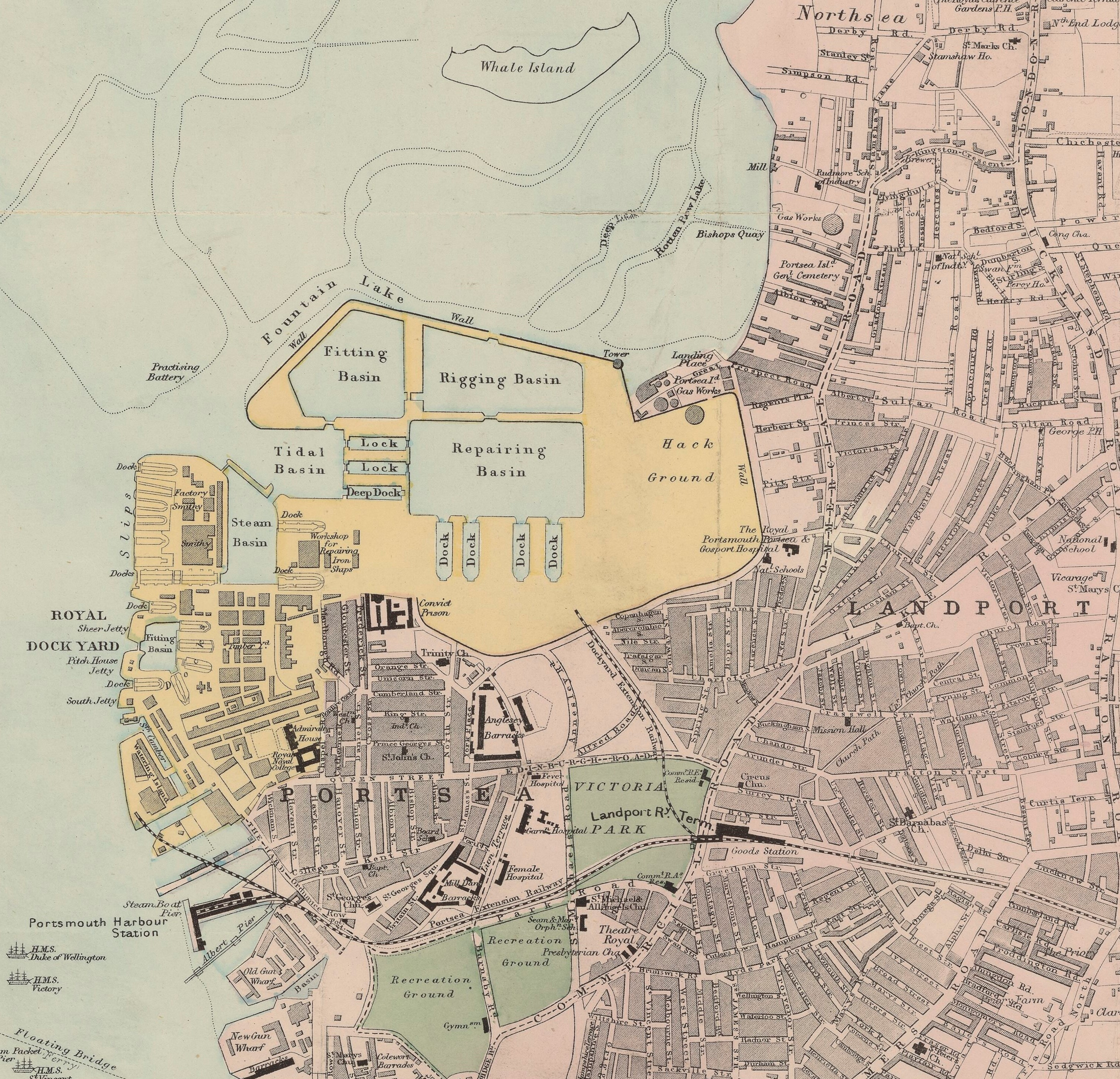
The United Services Recreation Ground is seen on this map by George Washington Bacon (c. 1880) (captioned "Recreation Ground", running adjacent to St. Michaels Road).

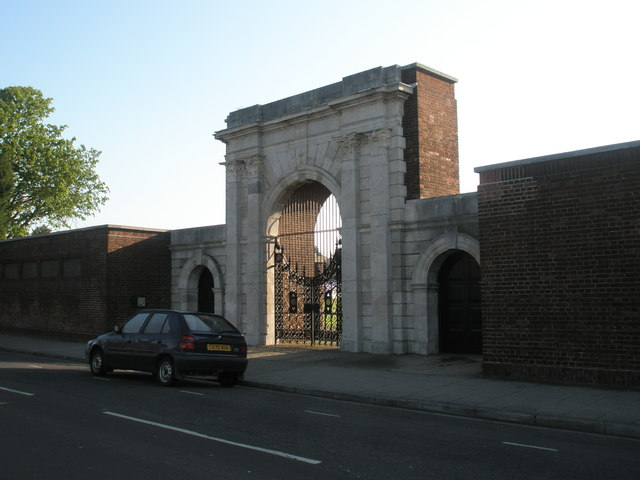
The gated archway, in Burnaby Road, serves as the main entrance to the ground. The gate was previously part of King James' Gate, which stood in Broad Street and was the entrance to Old Portsmouth.

Located to the north of Old Portsmouth, the area the ground occupies was previously a sea inlet in the 17th century, across which a dam was built; this dam allowed the sea into the inlet when the tide came in, and when the tide went back out the dam was closed and the water was only allowed to escape under a watermill, named King's Mill, which powered the production of grain in the mill. After this, the land was gradually reclaimed from the sea.

There is evidence that cricket has been played at the United Services Recreation Ground since 1852. The ground in its present location is said to have been made available following largescale demolition of defence works in the city during the 1870s. First-class cricket was first played there on 17, 18 and 19 August 1882, when the touring Australians played Cambridge University Past and Present. This first match was won by Cambridge University Past and Present by 20 runs, following an Australian batting collapse in which A. G. Steel took 5/24. Hampshire first played there a week after the first match, against Sussex in which they lost by an innings. Over the coming decade the ground was used once by G.N. Wyatt's XI, on three occasions by Oxford and Cambridge Universities Past and Present and twice by the East of England. Hampshire lost first-class status during this period and were considered a second-class county, though Hampshire did play at the ground once during this period against Sussex in 1888. The 1893 match between the Australians and Oxford and Cambridge Universities Past and Present was notable for the Australians setting what was then a record first-class innings score of 843.

The amateur level football club Royal Artillery (Portsmouth) also played home matches there from 1894 until it was dissolved in 1899 following an FA Amateur Cup tie in which The Football Association expelled the club from the competition for alleged 'professionalism'; following this, it was decided to form a professional football club for the town, with the foundation of the present day Portsmouth F.C..

=== Regular county venue ===
Hampshire regained first-class status in 1895 and were admitted to the expanded County Championship. Hampshire played their first first-class match at the ground in thirteen years in that season when they played Leicestershire, which Hampshire won by 3 wickets, due in part to a five wicket haul from Jimmy Wootton and an unbeaten half century from Francis Quinton. Over the coming seasons, Hampshire tended to play two to three matches there per season. An 1897 fixture between Hampshire and Sussex saw Arthur Webb score Hampshire's first first-class century, while a match the following season which saw Surrey as the visitors drew a crowd of around 5,000. The grounds naval connection saw services players bought into the Hampshire team on occasion, including the future Admiral Alan Hotham. The early 1900s saw little success for Hampshire at the ground, with the county winning just two of eighteen matches played at the ground from 1900 to 1907. Considered a weak Hampshire team at the time, the county finished last in the County Championship in 1900 and 1902–1905, it wasn't until 1907 that Hampshire won again at the ground thanks to 88 and 6/55 from Phil Mead against Somerset. The arrangement of playing three matches a season at the ground continued until World War I, while the first first-class match involving a services team took place in July 1911 when a combined Army and Navy team played a combined Oxford and Cambridge Universities team.

After the war, Hampshire played Sussex there in 1919, a season which also saw the South play the Australian Imperial Forces, before the resumption of first three matches, then four matches per season being played there. 1920 saw Hampshire's first even double century opening wicket partnership between Alex Bowell and George Brown, with the two compiling a partnership of 204. The emergence of Alec Kennedy and Jack Newman during this period under the captaincy of Lord Tennyson led to stronger Hampshire performances, with Hampshire winning all three matches played at the ground in the 1921 season. The Combined Services played only their second ever first-class match in that same season against the Australians. Later in the 1920s, the Royal Navy played first-class cricket at the ground for the first time, against the 1927 touring New Zealanders. The first hat trick at the ground was taken by Stuart Boyes in 1925. Hampshire continued to play at the ground throughout the thirties, at a time when following the retirements of George Brown, Phil Mead, Jack Newman and Lord Tennyson Hampshire were a less successful team. Hampshire played four matches per season there during the thirties, except 1938 when they played five matches, before returning to four in 1939. Hampshire record partnership for the fifth wicket was made there in 1937, when Gerry Hill and Donald Walker put on 235, a record which stands to this day. World War II ended county cricket until 1946, and during the war Portsmouth was heavily bombed by the German Luftwaffe during The Blitz.

=== Post-World War II ===
First-class cricket returned to the ground after the war, when Hampshire played Essex. The record attendance for a county match was achieved in 1948, when 10,000 watched Hampshire play Sussex. Hampshire continued to play four matches per season at United Services going into the 1950s. It was during this time under the leadership of Desmond Eagar and Colin Ingleby-Mackenzie that the Hampshire team was beginning to become a powerful force in the county game. Coupled with the batting of Roy Marshall (who in five Portsmouth matches in 1957 scored 549, an unbeaten record for the ground), Jimmy Gray and Henry Horton, and backed up with the bowling of Derek Shackleton, Victor Cannings and Malcolm Heath, Hampshire had a fairly successful period, finishing runners-up in 1958, before winning the County Championship for the first time in 1961, with Hampshire winning four of their five matches there in that season. They might have been successful in 1958, had it not been for two draws later in the season at the ground. A new format, List A cricket, was introduced in 1963, and two years after its introduction, the ground held its first List A match when Hampshire played Kent in the 1965 Gillette Cup. Six first-class matches had been held there in 1962, before the schedule at the ground was reduced to five, with the expansion of List A cricket with the Player's County League and John Player League, on average two or three List A matches were held there over the coming seasons. Hampshire were pressing for the Player's County League title in 1969, with a crowd of 8,000 watching their defeat to Essex. Hampshire finished that season's competition one point behind winners Lancashire. A first-class match in 1971 between Hampshire and the touring Pakistanis saw protests by Bangladeshis protesting Pakistani actions in the Bangladesh Liberation War. Hampshire won the County Championship for a second time in 1973, though the 1970s saw a gradual reduction in the number of first-class matches held at the United Services ground, and by the end of that decade three first-class matches and two List A matches were granted to the ground each season. This decade also saw logistical problems when trees at the Railway End which had blocked a batsman's sight of passing trains were cut down. As a result of this, Hampshire did not play in Portsmouth in 1975, though the purchase of screens allowed county cricket to return in 1976. 1976 was also not without its problems, when a County Championship match against Yorkshire was interrupted by vandals who had attacked the pitch during the night; despite this setback, the match continued on an adjoining strip of pitch.

=== Later history and decline ===
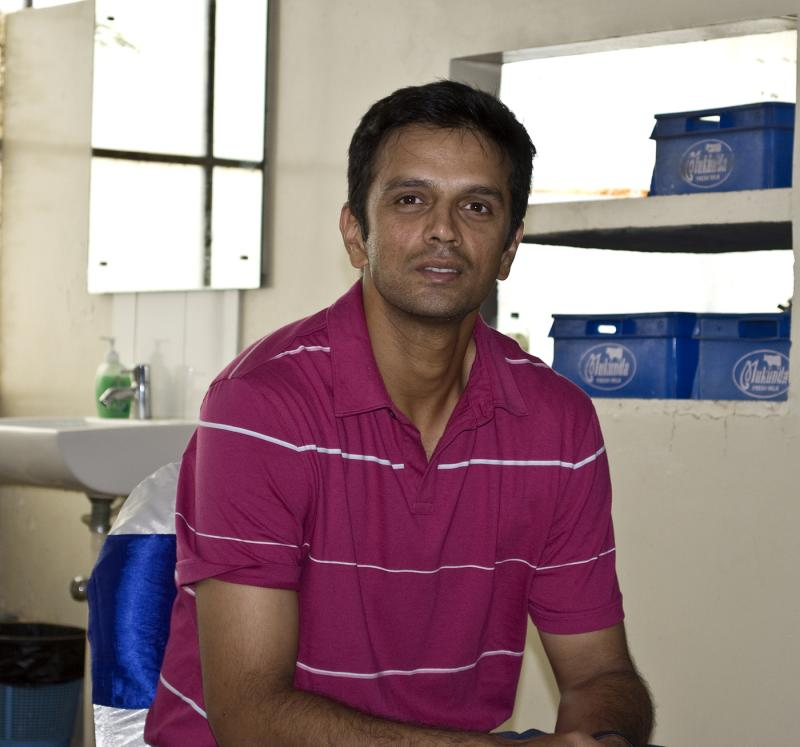
Rahul Dravid (pictured) scored the final first-class century at the ground for Kent in 2000.

The ground saw a reduction in the number of Hampshire fixtures it held during a season, with the number of List A matches dropping to two per season up until 1984, after which one match per season was held there. First-class cricket was reduced in 1980 to two matches per season. Hampshire played one match there in their 1986 John Player Special League winning run, defeating Warwickshire. Speculation about the ground's future use by Hampshire was mentioned as early as 1984, when a review of Portsmouth's history, published by Peter Thompson in The News, speculated whether ground would survive to see a century of county cricket in 1995. County cricket there did indeed carry on past the 1980s, with the start of the next decade saw two astonishing matches with Derbyshire as the visitors during the grounds "Cricket Week". Having recently defeated Nottinghamshire at the ground in the previous match, with Malcolm Marshall finishing with match figures of 9 for 94, Hampshire followed this up by recording their largest margin of victory in the Sunday League. Hampshire made 250 in their innings, before Paul-Jan Bakker and Cardigan Connor dismissed the visitors for just 61. To this day it is the joint lowest score Hampshire have dismissed a team for. In the County Championship match between the sides, Derbyshire looked on course to chase down their victory target of 235, when they were at 140/2. However, Malcolm Marshall took 7 wickets in 51 balls to hand Hampshire a 48 run victory. The local press described it as Marshall's "finest hour".

Hampshire used the ground through most of the 1990s. Feats included their highest shared match aggregate of 1,457 runs with Sussex in 1993, while the following season they made their fourth highest first-class total at the ground when they scored 512 against Durham. The pattern of holding two County Championship matches and one List A match per season continued through the 1990s, however Hampshire stayed away in 1999 as a result of poor pitch reports prior to the season and fear of points deductions by the ECB should they play on substandard pitches; it was only the second time since 1895 that county cricket had not been played in Portsmouth during a season. Hampshire returned in 2000, playing two first-class matches. The first saw New Zealand A defeat Hampshire after chasing down 337, just two short of the record chase at the ground by Surrey in 1937. The second saw Kent as the visitors, with Rahul Dravid scoring the grounds final first-class century, while Shaun Udal took the final wicket. Hampshire lost their final first-class match there by 6 wickets. Their final match there came days later in a List A fixture against Middlesex in the Norwich Union National League, which Hampshire lost by 4 wickets. With continued poor pitch reports and the centralisation of Hampshire's cricket at their new Rose Bowl ground, these matches marked the final time Hampshire would play at the ground. Hampshire played 314 first-class matches there, winning 104 (33%), which compares favourably with Hampshire's other main grounds of the time, with a 27% win ratio at Dean Park, Bournemouth, and a 26% win ratio at the County Ground, Southampton. Hampshire also played 54 List A matches there.

== Records ==
=== First-class ===
- Highest team total: 843 by Australians v Oxford and Cambridge Universities Past and Present, 1893
- Lowest team total: 35 by Hampshire v Middlesex, 1922
- Highest individual innings: 302* by Percy Holmes for Yorkshire v Hampshire, 1920
- Best bowling in an innings: 9–30 by Derek Shackleton for Hampshire v Warwickshire, 1960
- Best bowling in a match: 13–86 by Malcolm Heath for Hampshire v Sussex, 1958

=== List A ===
- Highest team total: 313/2 (50 overs) by Hampshire v Sussex, 1993
- Lowest team total: 61 (19.1 overs) by Derbyshire v Hampshire, 1990
- Highest individual innings: 166* by Trevor Jesty for Hampshire v Surrey, 1983
- Best bowling in an innings: 6/22 by Raymond Bailey for Northamptonshire v Hampshire, 1972

== See also ==
- List of Hampshire County Cricket Club grounds
- List of cricket grounds in England and Wales
