= Ashwin (disambiguation) =

Ashvin is a month of the Hindu calendar.

Ashwin, Ashvin, Ashveen or Asvin may also refer to:

- Ashwin (Nepali calendar), a month of the Nepali calendar
- Ashvins, divine twins in Vedic mythology (or Ashveens)
- Asvins (film), a 2023 Indian film
- Ašvieniai, divine twins in Lithuanian mythology
- Ashwin (given name), including a list of people with the name
- Ashwin (surname), including a list of people with the name
- Ashwin (missile), part of the Indian Ballistic Missile Defence Programme

== See also ==
- Aescwine, an Anglo-Saxon name, whose modern descendant is Ashwin
- Ashwini (disambiguation)
- Ashwin and Falconer, a stained glazing partnership in Australia
