= 2008–09 EDF Energy Cup =

Tournament details
- Countries: England; Wales
- Tournament format(s): Round-robin and knockout
- Date: October 2008 - April 2009

Tournament statistics
- Teams: 16

Final
- Venue: Twickenham
- Attendance: 54,899
- Champions: (Wales) Cardiff Blues (1st title)
- Runners-up: (England) Gloucester

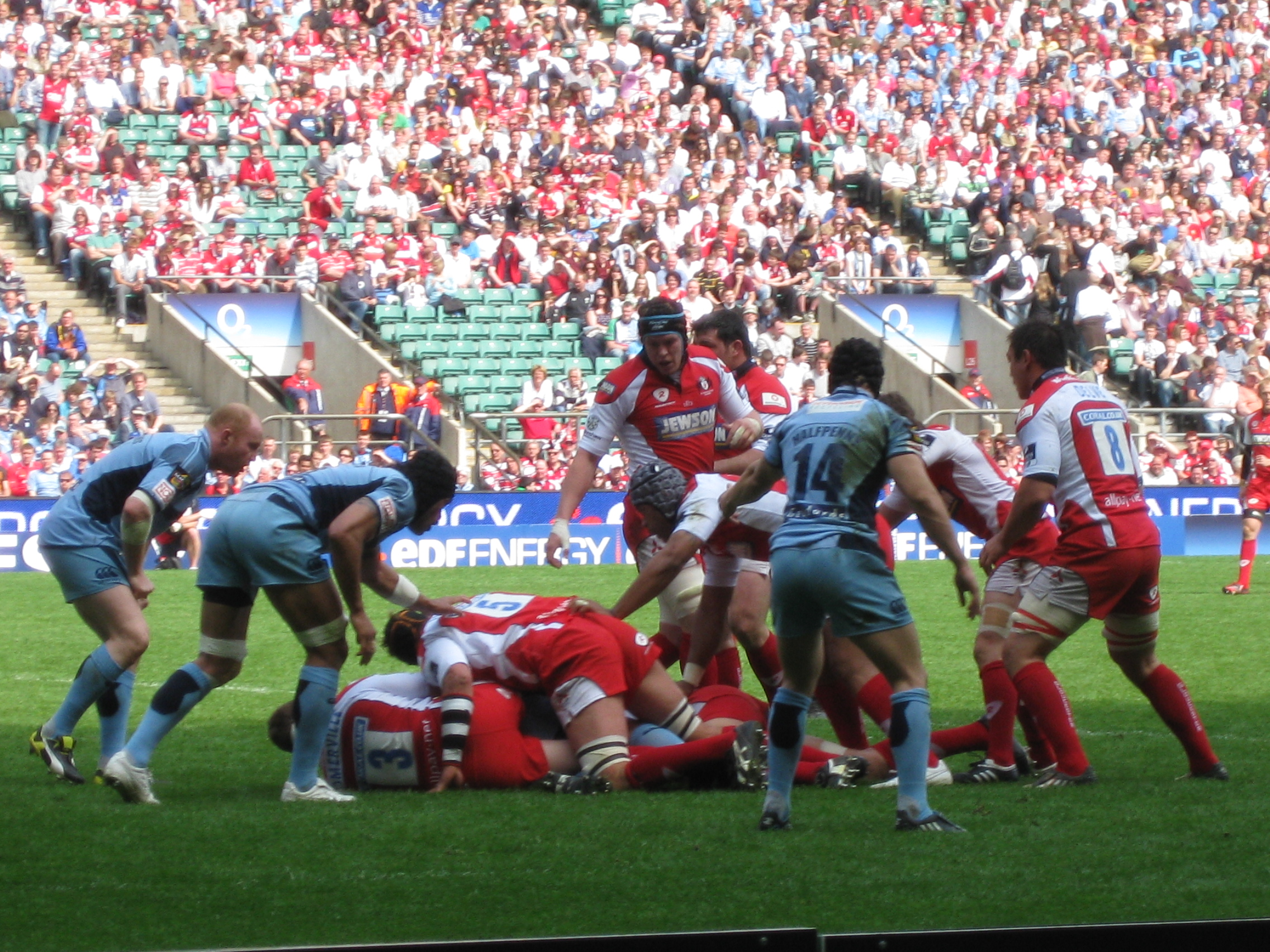
Gloucester and the Cardiff Blues in the final of the 2008-09 EDF Energy Cup

The 2008–09 Anglo-Welsh Cup, known as the EDF Energy Cup for sponsorship reasons, was the 38th season of England's national rugby union cup competition, and the fourth to follow the recently adopted Anglo-Welsh format.

As in the previous two years, the competition is contested between the twelve teams of the Guinness Premiership and the four Welsh regions from the Celtic League. The sixteen teams are arranged into four pools, with one Welsh and three English teams in each. Teams are randomly drawn into groups, as opposed to previous years when English sides were grouped according to proximity to one another. Each team plays the other team from their group only once, meaning that two teams in each group face two away games, whereas the other two teams have two home games.

== Group stage ==
In the pool matches, teams receive:

- Four points for a win
- Two points for a draw
- A bonus point for scoring four or more tries, regardless of the match result
- A bonus point for losing by seven or fewer points

The winner of each pool advances to the semi-finals, at which stage a draw takes place to determine the teams that will play each other. The winners of the semi-final advance to the final to determine the competition winner; no "third place final" is played.

=== Group A ===
| Team | Pld | W | D | L | PF | PA | PD | BP | Pts |
|---|---|---|---|---|---|---|---|---|---|
| (England) Gloucester | 3 | 3 | 0 | 0 | 60 | 49 | +11 | 1 | 13 |
| (England) London Wasps | 3 | 2 | 0 | 1 | 66 | 47 | +19 | 2 | 10 |
| (Wales) Newport Gwent Dragons | 3 | 1 | 0 | 2 | 55 | 60 | −5 | 1 | 5 |
| (England) Newcastle Falcons | 3 | 0 | 0 | 3 | 37 | 62 | −25 | 1 | 1 |

3 October 2008
19:05

| Newport Gwent Dragons (Wales) | 25–14 | (England) Newcastle Falcons |
| Tries: Stcherbina 20' c Isaacs 60' c Tovey 69' m Con: Tovey (2); Pen: Tovey (2) 6', 40' | Report | Tries: Penalty try 36' c Phillips 44' c Con: Clegg (2) |

Rodney Parade, Newport
Attendance: 4,683
Referee: Rob Debney

4 October 2008
14:30

| Gloucester (England) | 24–19 | (England) London Wasps |
| Vainikolo 23' m Walker 47' c Con: Walker; Pen: Walker (3) 17', 31', 70'; Drop: Lamb 20' | Report | Tries: Robinson 5' m Haskell 38' m Pen: Staunton (2) 29', 51'; Walder 77' |

Kingsholm, Gloucester
Attendance: 7,864

24 October 2008
20:00

| Newcastle Falcons (England) | 13–26 | (England) London Wasps |
| Try: Vickers 73' c Con: Clegg; Pen: Clegg (2) 2', 27' | Report | Tries: Sackey 12' m Rees 37' c Voyce 49' c Simpson 78' c Con: Cipriani (3) |

Kingston Park, Newcastle
Attendance: 5,202
Referee: Tim Wigglesworth

25 October 2008
15:00

| Gloucester (England) | 25–20 | (Wales) Newport Gwent Dragons |
| Tries: Vainikolo 17' c, 65' m Lawson 34' m Balshaw 67' m Con: Barkley; Pen: Barkley 78' | Report | Tries: Fussell 20' m Webb 28' c Tovey 80' m Con: Connor; Pen: Connor 46' |

Kingsholm, Gloucester
Attendance: 8,057

2 November 2008
15:00

| London Wasps (England) | 21–10 | (Wales) Newport Gwent Dragons |
| | Report |

Adams Park, High Wycombe
Attendance: 7,980
Referee: Chris White

2 November 2008
15:00

| Newcastle Falcons (England) | 10–11 | (England) Gloucester |
| | Report |

Kingston Park, Newcastle
Attendance: 3,614

=== Group B ===
| Team | Pld | W | D | L | PF | PA | PD | BP | Pts |
|---|---|---|---|---|---|---|---|---|---|
| (Wales) Cardiff Blues | 3 | 3 | 0 | 0 | 65 | 44 | +21 | 0 | 12 |
| (England) Leicester Tigers | 3 | 2 | 0 | 1 | 58 | 58 | 0 | 0 | 8 |
| (England) Bath | 3 | 1 | 0 | 2 | 57 | 64 | −7 | 2 | 6 |
| (England) Sale Sharks | 3 | 0 | 0 | 3 | 58 | 72 | −14 | 2 | 2 |

4 October 2008
14:15

| Bath (England) | 15–19 | (England) Leicester Tigers |
| Tries: Higgins (2) 5' c, 33' m Con: Kydd; Pen: Kydd 52' | Report | Try: Youngs 18' c Con: Hougaard; Pen: Hougaard (3) 7', 15', 60'; Drop: Hougaard 70' |

Recreation Ground, Bath
Attendance: 10,600

4 October 2008
15:00

| Sale Sharks (England) | 17–18 | (Wales) Cardiff Blues |
| Try: Keil 16' m Pen: Macleod (4) 2', 32', 44', 53' | Report | Tries: Halfpenny 12' c Mustoe 74' m Con: Blair; Pen: Blair 29'; Sweeney 58' |

Edgeley Park, Stockport
Attendance: 7,485

24 October 2008
19:45

| Sale Sharks (England) | 21–24 | (England) Bath |
| Tries: Bell (2) 24' c, 73' m Con: Hodgson; Pen: Hodgson (3) 2', 9', 49' | Report | Tries: Hooper 40' c Hape 52' c Stephenson 56' c Con: Cuthbert (3); Pen: Cuthbert 47' |

Edgeley Park, Stockport
Attendance: 7,659
Referee: Peter Allan

25 October 2008
14:35

| Cardiff Blues (Wales) | 23–9 | (England) Leicester Tigers |
| Tries: Robinson 44' c Spice 79' c Con: Blair (2); Pen: Blair (3) 6', 14', 73' | Report | Pen: Hougaard (3) 40+1', 49', 67' |

Cardiff Arms Park, Cardiff
Attendance: 9,815
Referee: Dave Pearson

31 October 2008
19:35

| Cardiff Blues (Wales) | 24–18 | (England) Bath |
| Tries: Molitika 4' c Filise 69' m Con: Blair; Pen: Blair (4) 10', 20', 55', 80' | | Tries: Maddock 60' m Higgins 74' c Con: Berne; Pen: Cuthbert 3'; Maddock 53' |

Cardiff Arms Park, Cardiff
Attendance: 10,139
Referee: Nigel Owens

31 October 2008
19:35

| Leicester Tigers (England) | 30–20 | (England) Sale Sharks |
| Tries: Penalty try 19' c Youngs 57' c Crane 80' c Con: Hougaard (2); Newby; Pen: Hougaard (3) 11', 14', 77' | | Tries: Bell (2) 50' c, 70' c Con: Macleod (2); Pen: Macleod (2) 45', 48' |

Welford Road, Leicester
Attendance: 16,550
Referee: James Jones

=== Group C ===
| Team | Pld | W | D | L | PF | PA | PD | BP | Pts |
|---|---|---|---|---|---|---|---|---|---|
| (Wales) Ospreys | 3 | 2 | 0 | 1 | 80 | 68 | +12 | 2 | 10 |
| (England) London Irish | 3 | 2 | 0 | 1 | 60 | 58 | +2 | 1 | 9 |
| (England) Harlequins | 3 | 1 | 0 | 2 | 67 | 70 | −3 | 1 | 5 |
| (England) Worcester Warriors | 3 | 1 | 0 | 2 | 58 | 69 | −11 | 1 | 5 |

5 October 2008
15:00

| Worcester Warriors (England) | 22–5 | (England) London Irish |
| Tries: Benjamin (2) 16' c, 61' m Kitchener 30' m Crichton 76' m Con: Jones | Report | Try: Richards 54' |

Sixways Stadium, Worcester
Attendance: 7,433

5 October 2008
15:05

| Ospreys (Wales) | 24–23 | (England) Harlequins |
| Tries: Williams 35' m Bowe 78' c Con: Hook; Pen: Hook (4) 13', 23', 33', 62' | Report | Tries: de Wet Barry 44' c Fuga 54' c Con: Luveniyali (2); Pen: Luveniyali (3) 29', 60', 65' |

Liberty Stadium, Swansea
Attendance: 8,057
Referee: Tim Wigglesworth

25 October 2008
15:00

| Harlequins (England) | 17–32 | (England) London Irish |
| Tries: Davies 7' m Amesbury 13' c McMillan 46' m Con: Jewell | Report | Tries: Thorpe 36' m Hewat (2) 49' c, 78' c Thompstone 54' m Bailey 58' m Con: Hewat; Hickey; Pen: Geraghty 62' |

Twickenham Stoop, Twickenham
Attendance: 11,473

26 October 2008
15:05

| Ospreys (Wales) | 37–22 | (England) Worcester Warriors |
| Tries: Walker 31' m Henson 39' m Williams 44' c Bowe 80+2' m Con: Hook; Pen: Hook (5) 18', 28', 59', 63', 75' | Report | Try: Tuitupou 56' c Con: Jones; Pen: Jones (5) 14', 34', 42', 48', 70' |

Liberty Stadium, Swansea
Attendance: 7,025

2 November 2008
15:00

| London Irish (England) | 23–19 | (Wales) Ospreys |
| | Report |

Madejski Stadium, Reading
Attendance: 9,293

2 November 2008
15:00

| Worcester Warriors (England) | 14–27 | (England) Harlequins |
| | Report |

Sixways Stadium, Worcester
Attendance: 8,113

=== Group D ===
| Team | Pld | W | D | L | PF | PA | PD | BP | Pts |
|---|---|---|---|---|---|---|---|---|---|
| (England) Northampton Saints | 3 | 2 | 0 | 1 | 82 | 70 | +12 | 2 | 10 |
| (Wales) Scarlets | 3 | 2 | 0 | 1 | 73 | 50 | +23 | 0 | 8 |
| (England) Saracens | 3 | 2 | 0 | 1 | 74 | 67 | +7 | 0 | 8 |
| (England) Bristol | 3 | 0 | 0 | 3 | 39 | 81 | −42 | 1 | 1 |

4 October 2008
15:00

| Northampton Saints (England) | 30–17 | (England) Bristol |
| Tries: Diggin 8' m Dickson 23' m Ashton 48' c Mayor 55' c Con: Everitt (2); Pen: Everitt (2) 35', 79' | Report | Tries: Turner (2) 3' m, 21' m Lilo 71' c Con: Ashwin |

Franklin's Gardens, Northampton
Attendance: 11,301
Referee: Nigel Owens

5 October 2008
15:00

| Saracens (England) | 17–26 | (Wales) Scarlets |
| Tries: Leonelli 12' c Cato 18' c Con: Ross (2); Pen: Ross 43' | Report | Tries: Lyons 8' c Meeuws 48' c Con: S. Jones (2); Pen: S. Jones (4) 24', 32', 40', 63' |

Vicarage Road, Watford
Attendance: 6,068

24 October 2008
19:05

| Scarlets (Wales) | 27–0 | (England) Bristol |
| Tries: Stoddart 3' c Easterby 37' c Higgitt 63' c Con: S. Jones (3); Pen: S. Jones (2) 15', 49' | Report |

Stradey Park, Llanelli
Attendance: 10,500
Referee: David Bodilly

- This was the Scarlets' last competitive match at Stradey Park, home to Llanelli RFC since 1879. The new Parc y Scarlets opened in November.

26 October 2008
15:00

| Saracens (England) | 33–19 | (England) Northampton Saints |
| Tries: Cato 12' m Rauluni 23' c Con: Ross; Pen: Ross (6) 17', 26', 49', 61', 68', 80'; Drop: Ross 40' | Report | Tries: Foden 24' m Wilson 30' m Pen: Myler (3) 14', 20', 56' |

Vicarage Road, Watford
Attendance: 6,984
Referee: Martin Fox

1 November 2008
14:30

| Bristol (England) | 22–24 | (England) Saracens |
| | Report |

Memorial Stadium, Bristol
Attendance: 5,025

1 November 2008
14:30

| Northampton Saints (England) | 33–20 | (Wales) Scarlets |
| Tries: Ashton (2) 11' m, 29' m Reihana 45' c Sean Lamont; Con: Myler; Pen: Myler (2) 23' 61' | | Tries: King 5' m Stoddart 8' m Davies; Pen: C. Thomas 17' |

Franklin's Gardens, Northampton

=== Semi-finals ===
28 March 2009
14:30

| Gloucester (England) | 17–0 | (Wales) Ospreys |
| Try: Balshaw 76' m Pen: Lamb (3) 5', 45', 72'; Drop: Lamb 67' | Report |

Ricoh Arena, Coventry
Attendance: 26,744
Referee: Nigel Owens

28 March 2009
17:15

| Cardiff Blues (Wales) | 11–5 | (England) Northampton Saints |
| Try: Spice 33' m Pen: Blair (2) 2', 72' | Report | Try: Ansbro 42' m |

Ricoh Arena, Coventry
Attendance: 26,744
Referee: George Clancy

=== Final ===
18 April 2009
14:30

| Gloucester (England) | 12–50 | (Wales) Cardiff Blues |
| Tries: Foster 29' m Penalty try 73' c Con: Barkley | Report | Tries: Halfpenny (2) 11' c, 20' c James 37' m Blair (2) 66' c, 77' c Sweeney 68' c Shanklin 80' c Con: Blair (6); Pen: Blair 19' |

Twickenham, London
Attendance: 54,899
Referee: Alain Rolland (Ireland)

| FB | 15 | (England) Olly Morgan |
| RW | 14 | (Wales) Matthew Watkins |
| OC | 13 | (England) James Simpson-Daniel |
| IC | 12 | (England) Anthony Allen |
| LW | 11 | (England) Mark Foster |
| FH | 10 | (England) Ryan Lamb |
| SH | 9 | (Scotland) Rory Lawson |
| N8 | 8 | (Wales) Gareth Delve (c) |
| OF | 7 | (Fiji) Akapusi Qera |
| BF | 6 | (England) Luke Narraway |
| RL | 5 | (England) Alex Brown |
| LL | 4 | (Wales) Will James |
| TP | 3 | (New Zealand) Greg Somerville |
| HK | 2 | (France) Olivier Azam |
| LP | 1 | (England) Nick Wood |
Replacements:
| HK | 16 | (Scotland) Scott Lawson |
| PR | 17 | (Italy) Carlos Nieto |
| LK | 18 | (Italy) Marco Bortolami |
| FL | 19 | (England) Andy Hazell |
| SH | 20 | (Wales) Gareth Cooper |
| FH | 21 | (England) Olly Barkley |
| WG | 22 | (England) Charlie Sharples |
Coach:
Dean Ryan

| FB | 15 | (New Zealand) Ben Blair |
| RW | 14 | (Wales) Leigh Halfpenny |
| OC | 13 | (Wales) Tom Shanklin |
| IC | 12 | (Wales) Jamie Roberts |
| LW | 11 | (Wales) Tom James |
| FH | 10 | (Wales) Nicky Robinson |
| SH | 9 | (New Zealand) Jason Spice |
| N8 | 8 | (New Zealand) Xavier Rush |
| OF | 7 | (Wales) Martyn Williams |
| BF | 6 | (Tonga) Maama Molitika |
| RL | 5 | (New Zealand) Paul Tito (c) |
| LL | 4 | (Wales) Bradley Davies |
| TP | 3 | (Tonga) Taufaʻao Filise |
| HK | 2 | (Wales) Gareth Williams |
| LP | 1 | (Wales) Gethin Jenkins |
Replacements:
| PR | 16 | (Wales) John Yapp |
| HK | 17 | (Wales) Rhys Thomas |
| LK | 18 | (Wales) Deiniol Jones |
| FL | 19 | (Wales) Andy Powell |
| SH | 20 | (Wales) Richie Rees |
| FH | 21 | (Wales) Ceri Sweeney |
| FB | 22 | (Wales) Gareth Thomas |
Coach:
(Wales) Dai Young

== See also ==
- 2008–09 English Premiership (rugby union)
- 2008–09 Celtic League
