= Counties 4 Hampshire =

English rugby union league

- Current season or competition: 2024–25 Counties 4 Hampshire
- Sport: Rugby union
- Instituted: 1994; 32 years ago
- Number of teams: 14
- Country: England
- Most titles: Aldershot & Fleet, Kingsclere, Overton, Ventnor (2 titles)
- Website: englandrugby.com

Counties 4 Hampshire (formerly Hampshire 2) is an English level 10 rugby union league for teams based in Hampshire and the Isle of Wight. It was originally known as Hampshire 3 until the 2008–09 season when it was discontinued, but the division was reinstated as Hampshire 2 following restructuring of the Hampshire leagues for the 2018–19 season, which would once again see Hampshire rugby have three divisions as well as including second XV sides for the first time. Following the RFU's Adult Competition Review, from season 2022–23 it adopted its current name.

Promoted teams move up to Counties 3 Hampshire. Relegated teams drop down to Counties 5 Hampshire which is operated as a Hampshire RFU domestic competition. Hampshire RFU publishes its own regulations, fixtures, promotion/relegation arrangements and competition administration for Counties 5.

Competition points will be awarded as follows: For a win: five points; For a draw: three points; others i.e. match abandoned = two points. For a loss: one point; For losing by less than 15 points; one point. Four try bonus: one point.

== Season 2026–27 ==
Departing were Fawley, Lymington Mariners and Basingstoke II, promoted to Counties 3 Hampshire as champions, runners-up and third place respectively.

Team	Ground	Capacity	City/Area	Previous season
Alresford	Alresford Recreation Centre		New Alresford, Hampshire	7th
Bognor II	Hampshire Avenue		Bognor, West Sussex	Promoted from Counties 5 Hampshire (3rd)
Chineham	Basingstoke Sports & Social Club		Basingstoke, Hampshire	9th
Farnham III	Wilkinson Way		Farnham, Surrey	6th
Gosport & Fareham II	Gosport Park		Gosport, Hampshire	10th
Havant IV	Hook's Lane	1,500	Bedhampton, Havant, Hampshire	
Hook & Odiham	Papermill Avenue		Hook, Hampshire	4th
Locksheath Pumas	Wide Lane Sports Ground		Eastleigh, Hampshire	Promoted from Counties 5 Hampshire (runners-up)
Millbrook II	Lordshill Recreational Ground		Southampton, Hampshire	5th
New Milton & District II	Ashley Recreation Ground		Ashley, New Milton, Hampshire	Promoted from Counties 5 Hampshire (4th)
Sandown & Shanklin II	The Fairway Ground		Sandown, Isle of Wight	Promoted from Counties 5 Hampshire (champions)
Southsea Nomads	Cockleshell Gardens		Southsea, Portsmouth, Hampshire	8th

Locations of the 2026–27 Counties 4 Hampshire teams in Hampshire & Surrey
Locations of the 2026–27 Counties 4 Hampshire teams on the Isle of Wight

== Season 2025–26 ==
Departing were Alton and Winchester III, promoted to Counties 3 Hampshire as champions and runners-up respectively. Bognor II (10th) did not return for the new season.

Overton were initially placed in the league having been relegated from Counties 3 Hampshire (9th). However, shortly before the season began they were reinstated in the higher league with Farnham III taking the place instead.

Team	Ground	Capacity	City/Area	Previous season
Alresford	Alresford Recreation Centre		New Alresford, Hampshire	7th
Basingstoke II	Down Grange		Basingstoke, Hampshire	Promoted from Hampshire Premiership North (1st)
Chineham	Basingstoke Sports & Social Club		Basingstoke, Hampshire	4th
Farnham III	Wilkinson Way		Farnham, Surrey	New entry
Fawley	Newlands Road		Fawley, Hampshire	3rd
Gosport & Fareham II	Gosport Park		Gosport, Hampshire	6th
Hook & Odiham	Papermill Avenue		Hook, Hampshire	8th
Lymington Mariners	Woodside Park		Lymington, Hampshire	5th
Millbrook II	Lordshill Recreational Ground		Southampton, Hampshire	Promoted from Hampshire Premiership South (1st)
Southsea Nomads	Cockleshell Gardens		Southsea, Portsmouth, Hampshire	9th

Locations of the 2025-26 Counties 4 Hampshire teams in Hampshire & Surrey

== Season 2024–25 ==
Ahead of the new season the experiment with parallel A and B divisions was abandoned and the league reinstated as a single competition. This season was the first when Counties 4 Hampshire was recognised and administered as a RFU league, rather than as part of the Hampshire RFU merit leagues.

Departing were Southampton, promoted to Counties 3 Hampshire.

Joining were Alresford, relegated from Counties 3 Hampshire, together with Alton who last competed in Counties 1 Hampshire in 2022-23 finishing 11th.

Team	Ground	Capacity	City/Area	Previous season
Alresford	Alresford Recreation Centre		New Alresford, Hampshire	Relegated from Counties 3 Hampshire
Alton	Antsey Park		Alton, Hampshire	Re-entry
Bognor II	Hampshire Avenue		Bognor, West Sussex	1st 4B
Chineham	Basingstoke Sports & Social Club		Basingstoke, Hampshire	7th 4A
Fawley	Gang Warily Recreation Centre		Fawley, Hampshire	3rd 4A
Gosport & Fareham II	Gosport Park		Gosport, Hampshire	2nd 4A
Hook & Odiham	Papermill Avenue		Hook, Hampshire	5th 4A
Lymington Mariners	Woodside Park		Lymington, Hampshire	6th 4A
Southsea Nomads	University of Portsmouth		Southsea, Portsmouth, Hampshire	4th 4A
Winchester III	North Walls Park		Winchester, Hampshire	2nd 4B

Locations of the 2024-25 Counties 4 Hampshire teams in Hampshire

== Season 2023–24 ==
Departing were Christchurch and Aldershot & Fleet, promoted to Counties 3 Hampshire.

Ahead of the new season the decision was taken to split the league into parallel A and B divisions.

=== Counties 4A ===
Team	Ground	Capacity	City/Area	Previous season
Andover III	Foxcotte Lane		Andover, Hampshire	Promoted from Counties 5 Hampshire North (champions)
Chineham	Basingstoke Sports & Social Club		Basingstoke, Hampshire	7th
Fawley	Gang Warily Recreation Centre		Fawley, Hampshire	Re-entry
Gosport & Fareham II	Gosport Park		Gosport, Hampshire	Relegated from Counties 3 Hampshire
Hook & Odiham	Papermill Avenue		Hook, Hampshire	4th
Lymington Mariners	Woodside Park		Lymington, Hampshire	Promoted Counties 5 Hampshire South West (champions)
Southsea Nomads	University of Portsmouth		Southsea, Portsmouth, Hampshire	3rd
Trojans II	Stoneham Lane		Eastleigh, Hampshire	Promoted Counties 5 Hampshire South East (champions)

Locations of the 2023-24 Counties 4A Hampshire teams in Hampshire

=== Counties 4B ===
Team	Ground	Capacity	City/Area	Previous season
Basingstoke II	Down Grange		Basingstoke, Hampshire	Promoted Counties 5 Hampshire North (4th)
Bognor II	Hampshire Avenue		Bognor, West Sussex	Re-entry
Chichester III	Oaklands Park		Chichester, West Sussex	Promoted Counties 5 Hampshire South East (runners-up)
Farnborough	Tilebarn Close		Farnborough, Hampshire	Promoted Counties 5 Hampshire North (runners-up)
Locksheath Pumas II	Brookfield Community School		Locks Heath, Fareham, Hampshire	Promoted Counties 5 Hampshire South East (3rd)
Millbrook II	5 Acres		Southampton, Hampshire	Promoted Counties 5 Hampshire South West (3rd)
Sandown & Shanklin II	The Fairway Ground		Sandown, Isle of Wight	6th
Tottonians Badgers	Water Lane		Totton, Hampshire	8th
Winchester III	North Walls Park		Winchester, Hampshire	Promoted Counties 5 Hampshire South West (runners-up)

Locations of the 2023-24 Counties 4B Hampshire teams in Hampshire
Locations of the 2023-24 Counties 4B Hampshire teams in Hampshire teams on the Isle of Wight

== Season 2022–23 ==
This was the first season following the RFU Adult Competition Review with the league adopting its new name of Counties 4 Hampshire.

Departing were Havant III, Andover II and Winchester II, all promoted to Counties 3 Hampshire. Petersfield II (5th) dropped into Counties 5 Hampshire South East.

Joining were Christchurch and Hook & Odiham.

Bognor II (6th in 2021–22) started but did not complete the season withdrawing part way through.

Team	Ground	Capacity	City/Area	Previous season
Aldershot & Fleet	Aldershot Park		Aldershot, Hampshire	8th
Chineham	Basingstoke Sports & Social Club		Basingstoke, Hampshire	7th
Christchurch	East Sports and Social Club		Christchurch, Dorset	Dorset & Wilts 2 South (runners-up)
Hook & Odiham	Papermill Avenue		Hook, Hampshire	Promoted from Hampshire Merit Tables
Sandown & Shanklin II	The Fairway Ground		Sandown, Isle of Wight	10th
Southsea Nomads	University of Portsmouth		Southsea, Portsmouth, Hampshire	9th
Southampton	Test Park Playing Fields		Southampton, Hampshire	4th
Tottonians Badgers	Water Lane		Totton, Hampshire	11th

Locations of the 2022-23 Counties 4 Hampshire teams in Hampshire & West Sussex
Locations of the 2022-23 Counties 4 Hampshire teams in Hampshire teams on the Isle of Wight

== Season 2021–22 ==
The teams competing in 2021–22 achieved their places in the league based on performances in 2019–20, the 'previous season' column in the table below refers to that season not 2020–21.

Stoneham started but did not complete the season withdrawing part way through.

Team	Ground	Capacity	City/Area	Previous season
Aldershot & Fleet	Aldershot Park		Aldershot, Hampshire	Promoted from Hampshire 3 (runners-up)
Andover II	Foxcotte Lane		Andover, Hampshire	5th
Bognor II	Hampshire Avenue		Bognor, Sussex	9th
Chineham	Fortress Chineham		Basingstoke, Hampshire	8th
Havant III	Hook's Lane	1,500	Havant, Hampshire	1st
Petersfield II	Penn's Place		Petersfield, Hampshire	3rd
Sandown & Shanklin II	The Fairway Ground		Sandown, Isle of Wight	Promoted from Hampshire 3
Southsea Nomads	University of Portsmouth		Southsea, Portsmouth, Hampshire	4th
Southampton	Test Park Playing Fields		Southampton, Hampshire	Relegated from Hampshire 1 (12th)
Tottonians Badgers	Water Lane		Totton, Hampshire	7th
Winchester II	North Walls Park		Winchester, Hampshire	2nd

Locations of the 2021–22 Hampshire 2 teams in Hampshire & West Sussex
Locations of the 2021–22 Hampshire 2 teams on the Isle of Wight

== Season 2020–21 ==
On 30 October the RFU announced that a decision had been taken to cancel Adult Competitive Leagues (National League 1 and below) for the 2020/21 season meaning Hampshire 2 was not contested.

== Season 2019–20 ==
For the 2019–20 season, the league was run as a 'Pro14' system, split into two pools. Teams played six home and six away games against the other teams in their pool, and another seven games against the teams in the other pool, giving clubs 19 games in the season.

Team	Ground	Capacity	City/Area	Previous season
Andover II	Foxcotte Lane		Andover, Hampshire	Relegated from Hampshire 1 (12th)
Basingstoke II	Down Grange	2,500 (250 seats)	Basingstoke, Hampshire	10th
Bognor II			Bognor, Sussex	Sussex 2 Reserves
Chineham	Fortress Chineham		Basingstoke, Hampshire	4th
Hook & Odiham			Hook, Hampshire	Promoted from Hampshire 3 (2nd)
Havant III	Hook's Lane	1,500	Havant, Hampshire	Hampshire 2 (champions)
Isle Of Wight 2nd XV	Footways		Wootton, Isle of Wight	Promoted from Hampshire 3 (champions)
New Milton II	Ashley Recreation Ground		Ashley, New Milton, Hampshire	Transferred from Dorset & Wilts 2 South (8th)
Overton II	The Old Cricket Ground		Laverstoke, Hampshire	9th
Petersfield II	Penn's Place		Petersfield, Hampshire	7th
Southsea Nomads	University of Portsmouth		Southsea, Portsmouth, Hampshire	3rd
Stoneham	University of Southampton		Southampton, Hampshire	5th
Tottonians Badgers	Water Lane		Totton, Hampshire	8th
Winchester II	North Walls Park		Winchester, Hampshire	Relegated from Hampshire 1 (No position as did not fulfil all fixtures)

Locations of the 2019–20 Hampshire 2 teams in Hampshire, Isle of Wight & West Sussex

== Season 2018–19 ==
Team	Ground	Capacity	City/Area	Previous season
Aldershot & Fleet	Aldershot Park		Aldershot, Hampshire	Relegated from Hampshire 2 (7th)
Basingstoke II	Down Grange	2,500 (250 seats)	Basingstoke, Hampshire	N/A
Chineham	Fortress Chineham		Basingstoke, Hampshire	Relegated from Hampshire 2 (9th)
Fareham Heathens II	Cams Alders Recreation Centre		Fareham, Hampshire	N/A
Fawley	Gang Warily Recreation Centre		Fawley, Hampshire	Relegated from Hampshire 2 (5th)
Havant III	Hook's Lane	1,500	Havant, Hampshire	N/A
Overton II	The Old Cricket Ground		Laverstoke, Hampshire	N/A
Petersfield II	Penn's Place		Petersfield, Hampshire	N/A
Southsea Nomads	University of Portsmouth		Southsea, Portsmouth, Hampshire	Relegated from Hampshire 2 (8th)
Stoneham	University of Southampton		Southampton, Hampshire	N/A
Tottonians Vets	Water Lane		Totton, Hampshire	N/A
Winchester Knights	North Walls Park		Winchester, Hampshire	N/A

Locations of the 2018–19 Hampshire 2 teams in Hampshire & West Sussex

== Original teams ==
When this division was introduced in 1994 (as Hampshire 3) it contained the following teams:

- Alresford - relegated from Hampshire 2 (8th)
- Basingstoke Wombats - relegated from Hampshire 2 (12th)
- Ellingham & Ringwood - relegated from Hampshire 2 (11th)
- Fleet - relegated from Hampshire 2 (9th)
- Nomads - relegated from Hampshire 2 (10th)
- Waterlooville - relegated from Hampshire 2 (7th)

== Hampshire 2 honours ==
=== Hampshire 3 (1994–1996) ===
Originally known as Hampshire 3, it was a tier 11 league. Promotion was to Hampshire 2 and as it was the lowest league tier in the region there was no relegation.

Hampshire 3
Season	No of Teams	Champions	Runners–up	Relegated Teams
1994–95	6	Fleet	Nomads	No relegation
1995–96	7	Overton	Alresford	No relegation
Green backgrounds are promotion places.

=== Hampshire 3 (1996–2000) ===
The cancellation of National 5 South at the end of the 1995–96 season meant that Hampshire 3 went from being a tier 11 to a tier 10 league. Promotion continued to Hampshire 2 and there was no relegation.

Hampshire 3
Season	No of Teams	Champions	Runners–up	Relegated Teams
1996–97	7	Team Solent	AC Delco	No relegation
1997–98	8	Hampshire Constabulary	Hamble	No relegation
1998–99	9	Stoneham	Chineham	No relegation
1999–00	7	Fordingbridge	Hampshire Constabulary	No relegation
2000–01	8	Aldershot & Fleet	Kingsclere	No relegation
Green backgrounds are promotion places.

=== Hampshire 3 (2000–2009) ===
The introduction of London 4 South West ahead of the 2000–01 season meant Hampshire 3 dropped to become a tier 11 league. Promotion continued to Hampshire 2 and there was no relegation. The division was cancelled at the end of the 2008–09 season, with the majority of teams transferring up into Hampshire 2.

Hampshire 3
Season	No of Teams	Champions	Runners–up	Relegated Teams
2001–02	7	Ellingham & Ringwood	Alresford	No relegation
2002–03	6	Kingsclere	Overton	No relegation
2003–04	6	Ventnor	Chineham	No relegation
2004–05	6	Kingsclere	Locksheath Pumas	No relegation
2005–06	6	East Dorset	Fawley	No relegation
2006–07	7	Lytchett Minster	Ventnor	No relegation
2007–08	7	Overton	Fawley	No relegation
2008–09	7	Ventnor	Chineham (Note: As Hampshire 3 was to be abolished all 7 teams in the division were promoted into Hampshire 2 for the following season.)	No relegation
Green backgrounds are promotion places.

=== Hampshire 2 (2018–present) ===
After an absence of nine years the division returned ahead of the 2018–19 season, this time with the name of Hampshire 2 due to Hampshire league restructuring. It remained a tier 11 league with promotion to Hampshire 1 (formerly Hampshire 2) and relegation to the newly introduced Hampshire 3.

Hampshire 2
Season	No of Teams	Champions	Runners–up	Relegated Teams
2018–19	12	Havant III	Fawley	Aldershot & Fleet, Fareham Heathens II, Winchester Knights (Note: Relegated due to Winchester II relegation to this league.)
2019–20	12			
Green backgrounds are promotion places.

== Number of league titles ==
- Aldershot & Fleet (2) (Note: Aldershot & Fleet's titles include 1 win by Fleet prior to merger.)
- Kingsclere (2)
- Overton (2)
- Ventnor (2)
- East Dorset (1)
- Ellingham & Ringwood (1)
- Fordingbridge (1)
- Hampshire Constabulary (1)
- Havant III (1)
- Lytchett Minster (1)
- Overton (1)
- Stoneham (1)
- Team Solent (1)

== See also ==
- Hampshire RFU
- English rugby union system
- Rugby union in England
