= Counties 3 Hampshire =

English level 10 Rugby Union league

- Current season or competition: 2024–25 Counties 3 Hampshire
- Sport: Rugby union
- Instituted: 1987; 39 years ago (as Hampshire 2)
- Number of teams: 10
- Country: England
- Most titles: Isle Of Wight (3 titles)
- Website: englandrugby.com

Counties 3 Hampshire (formerly Hampshire 1) is an English level 9 Rugby Union league for teams based in Hampshire and the Isle of Wight. Up until the 2017–18 season it was known as Hampshire 2 but was changed to Hampshire 1 following the restructuring of the Hampshire leagues, which would see the re-introduction of a third division as well as 2nd and 3rd XV sides joining for the first time. Following the RFU's Adult Competition Review, from season 2022–23 it adopted its current name Counties 3 Hampshire.

Each year some of the clubs in this division also take part in the RFU Junior Vase - a level 9-12 national competition.

Promoted teams move up to Counties 2 Hampshire. Relegated teams drop down to Counties 4 Hampshire.

The points system is as follows.

- 4 points awarded for a win.
- 2 points awarded for a draw.
- 0 points awarded for a loss.
- 1 "bonus" (+) point awarded for scoring 4 tries (or more).
- 1 "bonus" (+) point awarded for losing by 7 points (or fewer).

No team can get more than 5 points in a match. Points awarded are the same regardless of the outcome at home or away.

== Teams for 2026-27 ==
Departing were Ventnor and Tottonians II both promoted to Counties 2 Hampshire.

Team	Ground	Capacity	City/Area	Previous season
Aldershot & Fleet	Aldershot Park		Aldershot, Hampshire	8th
Alton	Antsey Park		Alton, Hampshire	6th
Andover II	Foxcotte Lane		Andover, Hampshire	Relegated from Counties 2 Hampshire (11th)
Basingstoke II	Down Grange		Basingstoke, Hampshire	Promoted from Counties 4 Hampshire (3rd)
Ellingham & Ringwood II	Parsonage Barn Lane		Ringwood, Hampshire	9th
Fawley	Newlands Road		Fawley, Hampshire	Promoted from Counties 4 Hampshire (champions)
Isle Of Wight	Footways		Wootton, Isle of Wight	4th
Lymington Mariners	Woodside Park		Lymington, Hampshire	Promoted from Counties 4 Hampshire (runners-up)
Overton	The Old Cricket Ground		Laverstoke, Hampshire	5th
Petersfield II	Penn's Place		Petersfield, Hampshire	Relegated from Counties 2 Hampshire (12th)
Portsmouth II	The Rugby Camp		Portsmouth, Hampshire	3rd
Winchester III	North Walls Park		Winchester, Hampshire	7th

Locations of the 2026-27 Counties 3 Hampshire teams in Hampshire & the Isle of Wight

== Teams for 2025–26 ==
Departing were Andover II, Romsey and Southampton, all to Counties 2 Hampshire.

Farnham III were initially placed in the league with Overton (9th) having been relegated to Counties 4 Hampshire. However, shortly before the season began Overton were reinstated in the higher league with Farnham III taking their place in Counties 4 Hampshire.

Eastleigh II (7th in 2024-25) began the campaign but subsequently withdrew in November leaving nine clubs to contest the outstanding fixtures.

Team	Ground	Capacity	City/Area	Previous season
Aldershot & Fleet	Aldershot Park		Aldershot, Hampshire	5th
Alton	Antsey Park		Alton, Hampshire	Promoted from Counties 4 Hampshire
Ellingham & Ringwood II	Parsonage Barn Lane		Ringwood, Hampshire	Level transfer from Counties 3 Dorset & Wilts South (3rd)
Isle Of Wight	Footways		Wootton, Isle of Wight	Relegated from Counties 2 Hampshire (9th)
Overton	The Old Cricket Ground		Laverstoke, Hampshire	9th
Portsmouth II	The Rugby Camp		Portsmouth, Hampshire	6th
Tottonians II	Water Lane		Totton, Hampshire	4th
Ventnor	Watcombe Bottom		Ventnor, Isle of Wight	8th
Winchester III	North Walls Park		Winchester, Hampshire	Promoted from Counties 4 Hampshire

Locations of the 2025-26 Counties 3 Hampshire teams in Hampshire & Surrey
Locations of the 2025-26 Counties 3 Hampshire teams on the Isle of Wight

== Teams for 2024–25 ==
Departing were Havant III, Isle Of Wight and Fareham Heathans, all promoted to Counties 2 Hampshire. Alresford were relegated to Counties 4 Hampshire.

Joining were Tottonians II, relegated from Counties 2 Hampshire and Southampton, promoted from Counties 4A Hampshire.

With four teams departing and two joining the league was reduced from twelve to ten sides.

Christchurch (9th in 2023–24) started but did not finish the season, leaving nine sides to complete the remaining fixtures.

Team	Ground	Capacity	City/Area	Previous season
Aldershot & Fleet	Aldershot Park		Aldershot, Hampshire	5th
Andover II	Foxcotte Lane		Andover, Hampshire	8th
Eastleigh II	The Hub		Eastleigh, Hampshire	10th
Overton	The Old Cricket Ground		Laverstoke, Hampshire	4th
Portsmouth II	The Rugby Camp		Portsmouth, Hampshire	7th
Romsey	Romsey Sports Centre		Romsey, Hampshire	6th
Southampton	Test Park Playing Fields		Southampton, Hampshire	Promoted from Counties 4A Hampshire
Tottonians II	Water Lane		Totton, Hampshire	Relegated from Counties 2 Hampshire
Ventnor	Watcombe Bottom		Ventnor, Isle of Wight	11th

Locations of the 2024-25 Counties 3 Hampshire teams in Hampshire & Dorset
Locations of the 2024-25 Counties 3 Hampshire teams on the Isle of Wight

== Teams for 2023–24 ==
Departing were Guernsey Vikings, Locksheath Pumas and Winchester II, all promoted to Counties 2 Hampshire, whilst Gosport & Fareham II (12th) were relegated to Counties 4 Hampshire.

Joining were Alresford and Eastleigh II, relegated from Counties 2 Hampshire together with Christchurch and Aldershot & Fleet, promoted from Counties 4A Hampshire.

Team	Ground	Capacity	City/Area	Previous season
Aldershot & Fleet	Aldershot Park		Aldershot, Hampshire	Promoted from Counties 4 Hampshire (runners-up)
Alresford	Alresford Recreation Centre		New Alresford, Hampshire	Relegated from Counties 2 Hampshire
Andover II	Foxcotte Lane		Andover, Hampshire	4th
Christchurch	East Sports and Social Club		Christchurch, Dorset	Promoted from Counties 4 Hampshire (champions)
Eastleigh II	The Hub		Eastleigh, Hampshire	Relegated from Counties 2 Hampshire
Fareham Heathens	Cams Alders Recreation Centre		Fareham, Hampshire	11th
Havant III	Hook's Lane		Bedhampton, Havant, Hampshire	7th
Isle Of Wight	Footways		Wootton, Isle of Wight	6th
Overton	The Old Cricket Ground		Laverstoke, Hampshire	5th
Portsmouth II	The Rugby Camp		Portsmouth, Hampshire	10th
Romsey	Romsey Sports Centre		Romsey, Hampshire	8th
Ventnor	Watcombe Bottom		Ventnor, Isle of Wight	9th

Locations of the 2023-24 Counties 3 Hampshire teams in Hampshire & Dorset
Locations of the 2023-24 Counties 3 Hampshire teams on the Isle of Wight

== Teams for 2022–23 ==
This was the first season following the RFU Adult Competition Review with the league adopting its new name of Counties 3 Hampshire.

Departing were Tottonians II and United Services Portsmouth, promoted to Counties 2 Hampshire. Fawley (3rd) did not return for the new season.

Joining were Havant III, Andover II and Winchester II, all promoted from Hampshire 2, together with Locksheath Pumas, relegated from Hampshire Premier, and Guernsey Vikings

Team	Ground	Capacity	City/Area	Previous season
Andover II	Foxcotte Lane		Andover, Hampshire	Promoted from Hampshire 2 (runners-up)
Fareham Heathens	Cams Alders Recreation Centre		Fareham, Hampshire	5th
Gosport & Fareham II	Gosport Park		Gosport, Hampshire	7th
Guernsey Vikings	Footes Lane		Saint Peter Port, Guernsey	New entry
Havant III	Hook's Lane		Bedhampton, Havant, Hampshire	Promoted from Hampshire 2 (champions)
Isle Of Wight	Footways		Wootton, Isle of Wight	6th
Locksheath Pumas	Wide Lane Sports Ground		Eastleigh, Hampshire	Relegated from Hampshire Premier
Overton	The Old Cricket Ground		Laverstoke, Hampshire	4th
Portsmouth II	The Rugby Camp		Portsmouth, Hampshire	8th
Romsey	Romsey Sports Centre		Romsey, Hampshire	10th
Ventnor	Watcombe Bottom		Ventnor, Isle of Wight	9th
Winchester II	North Walls Park		Winchester, Hampshire	Promoted from Hampshire 2 (3rd)

Locations of the 2022-23 Counties 3 Hampshire teams in Hampshire & the Channel Islands
Locations of the 2022-23 Counties 3 Hampshire teams on the Isle of Wight

== Teams for 2021–22 ==
Lockheath Pumas RFC finished 4th in 2019-20, but were promoted to Hampshire Premier for the current season, their place was taken by US Portsmouth who had withdrawn from London 3 South West in season 2019-20.

Farnborough who, were relegated from Hampshire Premier (12th) in 2019-20, fulfilled their early fixtures but subsequently withdrew from the league in November 2021.

The teams competing in 2021-22 achieved their places in the league based on performances in 2019-20, the 'previous season' column in the table below refers to that season not 2020-21.

Team	Ground	Capacity	City/Area	Previous season
Fareham Heathens	Cams Alders Recreation Centre		Fareham, Hampshire	Relegated from Hampshire Premier (11th)
Fawley	Gang Warily Recreation Centre		Fawley, Hampshire	5th
Gosport & Fareham II	Gosport Park		Gosport, Hampshire	10th
Isle Of Wight	Footways		Wootton, Isle of Wight	6th
Overton	The Old Cricket Ground		Laverstoke, Hampshire	5th
Portsmouth II	The Rugby Camp		Portsmouth, Hampshire	7th
Romsey	Romsey Sports Centre		Romsey, Hampshire	11th
Southampton University Hospitals	Southampton University Sports Ground		Eastleigh, Hampshire	3rd
Tottonians II	Water Lane		Totton, Hampshire	8th
United Services Portsmouth	Burnaby Road	8,000	Portsmouth, Hampshire	N/A (joined league)
Ventnor	Watcombe Bottom		Ventnor, Isle of Wight	9th

Locations of the 2021-22 Hampshire 1 teams in Hampshire & West Sussex
Locations of the 2021-22 Hampshire 1 teams on the Isle of Wight

== Season 2020–21 ==
On 30 October the RFU announced that a decision had been taken to cancel Adult Competitive Leagues (National League 1 and below) for the 2020/21 season meaning Hampshire 1 was not contested.

== Teams for 2019–20 ==
Team	Ground	Capacity	City/Area	Previous season
Chichester II	Oaklands Park		Chichester, West Sussex	Transferred from Sussex 3 (7th)
Fawley	Gang Warily Recreation Centre		Fawley, Hampshire	Promoted from Hampshire 2 (runners up)
Gosport & Fareham II	Gosport Park		Gosport, Hampshire	Relegated from Hampshire Premier (12th)
Isle Of Wight	Footways		Wootton, Isle of Wight	6th
Locksheath Pumas	Brookfield Community School		Locks Heath, Fareham, Hampshire	4th
Overton	The Old Cricket Ground		Laverstoke, Hampshire	5th
Portsmouth II	The Rugby Camp		Portsmouth, Hampshire	Relegated from Hampshire Premier (10th)
Romsey	Romsey Sports Centre		Romsey, Hampshire	7th
Southampton	Test Park Playing Fields		Southampton, Hampshire	9th
Southampton University Hospitals	Southampton University Sports Ground		Eastleigh, Hampshire	N/A (joined league)
Tottonians II	Water Lane		Totton, Hampshire	Relegated from Hampshire Premier (11th)
Ventnor	Watcombe Bottom		Ventnor, Isle of Wight	8th

Locations of the 2019-20 Hampshire 1 teams in Hampshire & West Sussex
Locations of the 2019-20 Hampshire 1 teams on the Isle of Wight

== Teams for 2018–19 ==
Team	Ground	Capacity	City/Area	Previous season
Alton	Antsey Park		Alton, Hampshire	6th
Andover II	Foxcotte Lane		Andover, Hampshire	N/A
Ellingham & Ringwood	Parsonage Barn Lane		Ringwood, Hampshire	Relegated from Hampshire 1 (8th)
Farnborough	Oak Farm Playing Fields		Farnborough, Hampshire	Champions (not promoted) (Note: Despite finishing as champions Farnborough were not promoted at the end of the 2017-18 season due to the Hampshire leagues being restructured.)
Isle Of Wight	Footways		Wootton, Isle of Wight	Relegated from Hampshire 1 (9th)
Locks Heath Pumas	Brookfield Community School		Locks Heath, Fareham, Hampshire	3rd
Overton	The Old Cricket Ground		Laverstoke, Hampshire	Relegated from Hampshire 1 (10th)
Romsey	Romsey Sports Centre		Romsey, Hampshire	Runners up (not promoted) (Note: Despite finishing as runners up Romsey were not promoted at the end of the 2017-18 season due to the Hampshire leagues being restructured.)
Southampton	Test Park Playing Fields		Southampton, Hampshire	4th
Ventnor	Watcombe Bottom		Ventnor, Isle of Wight	Relegated from Hampshire 1 (11th)

Locations of the 2018-19 Hampshire 1 teams in Hampshire
Locations of the 2018-19 Hampshire 1 teams on the Isle of Wight

== Participating clubs 2017–18 ==
Team	Ground	Capacity	City/Area	Previous season
Aldershot & Fleet	Aldershot Park		Aldershot, Hampshire	9th
Alton	Antsey Park		Alton, Hampshire	3rd
Chineham	Fortress Chineham		Basingstoke, Hampshire	Relegated from Hampshire 1 (11th)
Farnborough	Oak Farm Playing Fields		Farnborough, Hampshire	Relegated from Hampshire 1 (10th)
Fawley	Gang Warily Recreation Centre		Fawley, Hampshire	4th
Locks Heath Pumas	Brookfield Community School		Locks Heath, Fareham, Hampshire	6th
Romsey	Romsey Sports Centre		Romsey, Hampshire	Relegated from Hampshire 1 (9th)
Southsea Nomads	University of Portsmouth		Southsea, Portsmouth, Hampshire	7th
Southampton	Test Park Playing Fields		Southampton, Hampshire	5th

Locations of the 2017-18 Hampshire 2 teams

== Participating clubs 2016–17 ==
- Aldershot & Fleet
- Alresford
- Alton
- Fawley
- Kingsclere
- Loxheath Pumas (relegated from Hampshire 1)
- Lymington Mariners
- Nomads
- Overton
- Southampton

== Participating clubs 2015–16 ==
- Aldershot & Fleet
- Alresford
- Alton (relegated from Hampshire 1)
- Fawley
- Kingsclere
- Nomads
- Overton
- Romsey (relegated from Hampshire 1)
- Southampton
- Ventnor

== Participating clubs 2014–15 ==
- Aldershot & Fleet
- Alresford
- Chineham
- Fawley
- Locksheath Pumas
- Kingsclere
- Overton (relegated from Hampshire 1)
- Southampton (relegated from Hampshire 1)
- Southsea Nomads
- Ventnor

== Participating clubs 2013–14 ==
Position	Team	Games	Won	Drew	Lost	Points
1	Petersfield	18	17	0	1	80
2	Fareham Heathens	18	14	0	4	70
3	Locksheath Pumas	18	13	1	4	64
4	Ventnor	18	12	0	6	60
5	Fawley	18	12	0	6	53
6	Chineham	18	9	1	8	49
7	Southsea Nomads	18	7	0	11	36
8	Aldershot & Fleet	18	4	0	12	11
9	Stoneham	18	1	0	17	5
10	Alresford	18	2	0	14	-3

Petersfield and Fareham Heathens promoted into Hampshire 1 at the end of the season.

== Participating clubs 2012–13 ==
- Alresford
- Chineham
- Fareham Heathens
- Fawley
- Locksheath Pumas
- Lymington Mariners
- Nomads (relegated from Hampshire 1)
- Overton
- Solent University
- Stoneham
- Ventnor (relegated from Hampshire 1)

== Original teams ==
When league rugby began in 1987 this division (known as Hampshire 2) contained the following teams:

- Andover
- Ellingham & Ringwood
- Fordingbridge
- Guernsey
- Nomads
- Overton
- Pegasus Palmerians
- Romsey
- Ventnor
- Waterlooville

== Hampshire 1 honours ==
=== Hampshire 2 (1987–1993) ===
Originally known as Hampshire 2, it was tier 9 league with promotion up to Hampshire 1 and as it was the lowest league level in the region, there was no relegation.

Hampshire 2
Season	No of Teams	Champions	Runners–up	Relegated Teams
1987–88	10	Fordingbridge	Guernsey	No relegation
1988–89	10	Petersfield	Andover	No relegation
1989–90	13	Isle Of Wight	Farnborough	No relegation
1990–91	12	Tottonians	Fareham Heathens	No relegation
1991–92	11	New Milton & District	Farnborough (Note: 3rd place Andover also promoted.)	No relegation
1992–93	12	Trojans	Romsey	No relegation
Green backgrounds are promotion places.

=== Hampshire 2 (1993–1996) ===
The creation of National 5 South meant that Hampshire 2 dropped from a tier 9 league to a tier 10 league for the years that National 5 South was active. Promotion continued to Hampshire 1, while the introduction of Hampshire 3 ahead of the 1994–95 season meant that there was now relegation.

Hampshire 2
Season	No of Teams	Champions	Runners–up	Relegated Teams
1993–94	12	Esso	Guernsey	Multiple teams (Note: The creation of Hampshire 3 for the following season meant that six teams were relegated including Basingstoke Wombats, Ellingham & Ringwood, Nomads, Fleet, Alresford, and Waterlooville.)
1994–95	7	Andover	Fordingbridge	Overton, AC Delco
1995–96	7	Ventnor	Isle Of Wight	Fleet
Green backgrounds are promotion places.

=== Hampshire 2 (1996–2000) ===
The cancellation of National 5 South at the end of the 1995–96 season meant that Hampshire 2 reverted to being a tier 9 league. Promotion and relegation continued to Hampshire 1 and Hampshire 3 respectively.

Hampshire 2
Season	No of Teams	Champions	Runners–up	Relegated Teams
1996–97	12	Overton	New Milton & District	Alresford
1997–98	9	Ventnor	Trojans	No relegation
1998–99	8	Romsey	New Milton & District	Fordingbridge
1999–00	9	Sandown & Shanklin	Hamble	Stoneham, Chineham
Green backgrounds are promotion places.

=== Hampshire 2 (2000–2009) ===
The introduction of London 4 South West ahead of the 2000–01 season meant Hampshire 2 dropped to become a tier 10 league. Promotion and relegation continued to Hampshire 1 and Hampshire 3 respectively.

Hampshire 2
Season	No of Teams	Champions	Runners–up	Relegated Teams
2000–01	9	Fareham Heathens	Nomads	Team Solent
2001–02	10	New Milton & District	Eastleigh	Overton, Kingsclere
2002–03	9	Isle Of Wight	Fawley	East Dorset, Ventnor
2003–04	8	Alresford	Nomads	Kingsclere, Overton
2004–05	8	Aldershot & Fleet	Ellingham & Ringwood	Lytchett Minster, Fawley
2005–06	9	Farnborough	Eastleigh	Locksheath Pumas, Kingsclere, Ventnor
2006–07	9	East Dorset	Fordingbridge	Alresford, Fawley
2007–08	9	Eastleigh	Romsey	Chineham, Ventnor
2008–09	8	Aldershot & Fleet	Fareham Heathens	No relegation (Note: No relegation as Hampshire 3 would be abolished for the following season with all teams from that division moving up into Hampshire 2.)
Green backgrounds are promotion places.

=== Hampshire 2 (2009–2018) ===
Hampshire 2 remained a tier 10 league despite national restructuring by the RFU. Promotion was to Hampshire 1 and there was no relegation due to the cancellation of Hampshire 3 at the end of the 2008–09 season.

Hampshire 2
Season	No of Teams	Champions	Runners–up	Relegated Teams
2009–10	12	Isle Of Wight	Ventnor	No relegation
2010–11	9	Nomads	Lytchett Minster	No relegation
2011–12	10	Southampton	Aldershot & Fleet	No relegation
2012–13	11	Team Solent	Overton	No relegation
2013–14	10	Petersfield	Fareham Heathens	No relegation
2014–15	10	Locksheath Pumas	Chineham	No relegation
2015–16	10	Romsey	Ventnor	No relegation
2016–17	10	Alresford	Overton	No relegation
2017–18	9	Farnborough (Note: No teams were promoted this season due to the Hampshire leagues being restructured for the 2018-19 season.)	Romsey	Multiple teams (Note: The restructuring of the Hampshire leagues would see the creation of a new Hampshire 2 division into which four teams were relegated into, including Chineham, Southsea Nomads, Aldershot & Fleet, Fawley.)
Green backgrounds are promotion places.

=== Hampshire 1 (2018–present) ===
Restructuring of the Hampshire leagues saw Hampshire 2 renamed as Hampshire 1. It remained a tier 10 league with promotion to Hampshire Premier (formerly Hampshire 1) and relegation returned to the newly introduced Hampshire 2 (formerly Hampshire 3).

Hampshire 1
Season	No of Teams	Champions	Runners–up	Relegated Teams
2018–19	10	Alton	Ellingham & Ringwood (Note: 3rd place Farnborough also promoted.)	Andover II
2019–20	12 (Note: A number of new teams joined the league including Chichester II and Southampton University Hospitals.)	Chichester II	Overton	Southampton
2020–21	12			
Green backgrounds are promotion places.

== Number of league titles ==
- Isle Of Wight (3)
- Aldershot & Fleet (2)
- Alresford (2)
- Farnborough (2)
- New Milton & District (2)
- Petersfield (2)
- Romsey (2)
- Ventnor (2)
- Alton (1)
- Andover (1)
- Chichester II (1)
- East Dorset (1)
- Eastleigh (1)
- Esso (1)
- Fareham Heathens (1)
- Fordingbridge (1)
- Locksheath Pumas (1)
- Nomads (1)
- Overton (1)
- Sandown & Shanklin (1)
- Southampton (1)
- Team Solent (1)
- Tottonians (1)
- Trojans (1)

== See also ==
- London & SE Division RFU
- Hampshire RFU
- English rugby union system
- Rugby union in England
