= Winchester RFC =

English rugby union club, based in Winchester, Hampshire

- Full name: Winchester Rugby Football Club
- Union: English RFU
- Nickname: Winch
- Founded: 1929; 97 years ago
- Location: Winchester, Hampshire, England
- Region: Hampshire RFU
- Ground: North Walls Park
- Chairman: Steve Barrow
- Coach(es): Matt Stagg (DoR), Gareth Martin & Chris Searle (1stXV), Sam Mann (2ndXV), Rob West (Knights)
- Captain(s): Matt Golding (1stXV), George Porter (2ndXV), Martin Raper (3rdXV), Matt Stagg (Knights)
- League: Regional 2 South Central
- 2025–26: 2nd

Official website
- www.winchesterrugby.com

Winchester RFC is an English rugby union club affiliated with the Hampshire RFU. Winchester currently run four senior men's teams – 1st XV – who play in Regional 2 South Central, 2nd XV – who play in Counties 1 Hampshire, a 3rd XV – who play in Counties 4 Hampshire and the Knights – largely a veteran's side who play in Counties 5 Hampshire. There is a women's team and mini and juniors and colts sides covering all age groups from under-5s upwards.

== History ==
Winchester was founded in autumn 1929 when seventeen rugby enthusiasts met at the Cart & Horses pub in Kings Worthy. Up until 1971 their home ground was a field rented from a farmer in Kings Worthy when they moved to their present 10 acre ground at North Walls Park off Hilliers Way.

In 1994 local businessman Ashley Levett whose sons played in the mini and junior sections invested in the club and funded an extension the clubhouse which was originally built in 1973. Levett secured the services of Winchester's first paid coach Phil Davies who orchestrated Winchester being promoted from Hampshire 1 to London Division 1 in four years and winning two Hampshire Cup victories. Levett also purchased Richmond turning them into the first professional team in England but RFU rules prevented him having financial interests in two clubs and he departed Winchester.

== League record ==
Winchester League Record
Season	Division	Tier	Pts	Position	Outcome
1987–88	London 3 South West	7	8	8	relegated
1988–89	Hampshire 1	8	6	10	
1989–90	Hampshire 1	8	13	3	
1990–91	Hampshire 1	8	18	1	champions, promoted
1991–92	London 3 South West	7	9	6	
1992–93	London 3 South West	7	10	8	
1993–94	London 3 South West	7	3	12	relegated
1994–95	Hampshire 1	8	16	3	
1995–96	Hampshire 1	8	24	1	champions, promoted
1996–97	London 3 South West	7	20	1	champions, promoted
1997–98	London 2 South	6	26	2	runners-up
1998–99	London 2 South	6	28	1/15	champions, promoted
1999–00	London Division 1	5	20	7/17	
2000–01	London Division 1	5	10	9/11	
2001–02	London Division 1	5	14	10/12	
2002–03	London Division 1	5	16	10/12	relegated
2003–04	London 2 South	6	16	10/12	relegated
2004–05	London 3 South West	7	21	4/12	
2005–06	London 3 South West	7	22	5/12	
2006–07	London 3 South West	7	22	6/12	
2007–08	London 3 South West	7	22	6/12	
2008–09	London 3 South West	7	9	12/12	(Note: There was no relegation this year as the division would be renamed London Division 2 South West for the 2009-10 season and along with the whole national restructuring of the league system by the RFU lead to mass changes at all levels.)
2009–10	London 2 South West	7	9	12/12	relegated
2010–11	London 3 South West	8	51	8/12	
2011–12	London 3 South West	8	68	5/12	
2012–13	London 3 South West	8	93	1/12	champions, promoted
2013–14	London 2 South West	7	47	7/12	
2014–15	London 2 South West	7	72	3/12	
2015–16	London 2 South West	7	71	4/12	
2016–17	London 2 South West	7	51	7/12	
2017–18	London 2 South West	7	36	11/12	relegated
2018–19	London 3 South West	8	99	1/12	champions, promoted
2019–20	London 2 South West	7	66	4/12	league suspended (Note: League suspended on 16 March 2020 due to Coronavirus)

Winchester II League Record
Season	Division	Tier	Pts	Position	Outcome
2002–03	Senior Merit				champions
2008–09	Senior Merit		22	4/9	
2009–10	Senior Merit		14	10/10	relegated
2010–11	Merit One		78	1/12	champions
2011–12	Merit One		70	2/12	runners up
2012–13	Merit One		74	1/12	champions, promoted
2013–14	Senior Merit		21	6/9	
2014–15	Solent League		50	3/10	
2015–16	Solent League		27	4/8	
2016–17	Solent League		14	6/8	
2017–18	Solent 1		24	6/8	
2018–19	Hampshire 1	10	0	12/12	relegated (Note: Was not able to fulfill all fixtures so relegated with 0 points)
2019–20	Hampshire 2	11	81	2/12	league suspended (Note: League suspended on 16 March 2020 due to Coronavirus)

Winchester Knights/III League Record
Season	Division	Tier	Pts	Position	Outcome
2008–09	Merit One		35	2/10	runners up
2009–10	Merit One		40	1/9	champions, relegated (Note: Relegated due to Winchester II relegated from division above)
2010–11	Merit Two		65	4/12	
2011–12	Merit Two		60	3/11	
2012–13	Merit Two		75	1/11	champions, promoted
2013–14	Merit One		35	6/11	
2014–15	Hampshire South West		83	1/12	champions
2015–16	Solent League 2		11	8/8	
2016–17	Solent League 2		19	12/12	
2017–18	Waterfall Solent 2		42	3/12	
2018–19	Hampshire 2	11	61	6/12	relegated (Note: Relegated due to Winchester II relegated from division above)
2019–20	Hampshire 3	12	53	5/19	league suspended (Note: League suspended on 16 March 2020 due to Coronavirus)

== Honours ==
Men's 1st XV

- Hampshire Cup winners: 1976, 1998, 1999
- Hampshire 1 champions (2): 1990–91, 1995–96
- London 2 South West champions: 1996–97 (Note: When London 2 South West was known as London 3 South West (not to be confused with the current London 3 South West).)
- London 2 South champions: 1998–99
- London 3 South West champions (2): 2012–13, 2018–19

Youth/Colts

- Hampshire Colts Division 1 champions: 2018–19
- Hampshire Colts Division 1 champions: 2022–23
- Hampshire Colts Division 3 SW champions: 2018–19

== Notable club members ==
- Ben Donnell, lock/back-row who plays for London Irish and has represented England at U18 and U20 level.
- Joe Marchant, centre who played for Winchester as a school boy from 2002–12, Hampshire, Harlequins, Auckland Blues and England.
- Matt Durrant, flanker who played for Winchester and represented the Netherlands in Touch rugby.
- Chris Ashwin, fly-half who played for Winchester, Hampshire and Bristol.
- Andy Fields, hooker who played for Hong Kong and Valley, represented England at U20 and U18 level and was Head Coach of Winchester for seven years.
- Rolf Stratford, started playing with Winchester with stints at New Brighton and Rosslyn Park and represented British Polytechnics, English Students and Hampshire, returning to Winchester as a player, coach for many teams and was the club's President.
- Budge Pountney, flanker who won 31 caps and captained Scotland and was a player and then Director of Rugby at Northampton Saints.
- LeRoy Angel BEM, winger, played over 500 times for Winchester, most capped wing three-quarter for Hampshire, President of the RFU in 2005
- Ernest Beddard Jackson, prop who played over 200 times for Winchester and also for Worcester and had four England call ups between 1952-53.
- Charles Sylvester Wooldridge, played for Blackheath and England seven times between 1882 and 1885, was the club's first President.
