= Hampshire Merit Tables =

- Sport: Rugby union
- Country: England

The Hampshire Merit Tables are a set of leagues for rugby union teams based in Hampshire and the Isle of Wight for second, third and fourth teams of clubs who up until the 2018–19 season could not enter the first team leagues such as Hampshire 1 and Hampshire 2.

For the 2014–15 season the structure of the leagues changed to a regional basis consisting of Solent League, Hampshire South East, Hampshire South West and Hampshire North. In 2015–16 Solent League 2 was added.

In 2016–17 the leagues reverted to the older structure but named Solent League 1, 2, 3 and 4.

== Senior Merit Honours ==
Senior Merit Honours
Season	No of Teams	Champions	Runners–up	Relegated Teams	League Name
2008–09	9	Chichester 2nd XV	Tottonians II	No relegation	Hampshire Senior Merit
2009–10	10	Tottonians II	Chichester 2nd XV	Winchester II	Hampshire Senior Merit
2010–11	8	Chichester 2nd XV	Bournemouth II	No relegation	Hampshire Senior Merit
2011–12	9	Bournemouth II	Chichester 2nd XV	No relegation	Hampshire Senior Merit
2012–13	10	Basingstoke II	Chichester 2nd XV	Bournemouth III	Hampshire Senior Merit
2013–14	9	Basingstoke II	Oxford Harlequins II		Hampshire Senior Merit
2014–15	Regional structure				
2015–16	Regional structure				
2016–17	8	Basingstoke II	Tottonians II		Solent League
2017–18	8	Tottonians II	Portsmouth II		Solent 1

- Most titles: Basingstoke II (3)

== Merit One Honours ==
Merit One Honours
Season	No of Teams	Champions	Runners–up	Relegated Teams	League Name
2008–09	9	Sandown & Shanklin II	Winchester Knights	Basingstoke Griffins XV	Hampshire Merit One
2009–10	9	Winchester Knights	Gosport & Fareham II	Winchester Knights (Note: Relegated as Winchester II relegated from above division.)	Hampshire Merit One
2010–11	12	Winchester II	Havant III	Romsey II	Hampshire Merit One
2011–12	12	Team Solent	Winchester II	Andover II	Hampshire Merit One
2012–13	12	Winchester II	Sandown & Shanklin 2nd XV	Petersfield II	Hampshire Merit One
2013–14	11	Andover II	Basingstoke Griffins XV		Hampshire Merit One
2014–15	Regional structure				
2015–16	Regional structure				
2016–17	12	Andover 3rd XV	Basingstoke II		Solent League 2
2017–18	11	Havant III	Lymington Mariners		Solent 2
Green backgrounds are promotion places.

- Most titles: Winchester II (2)

== Merit Two Honours ==
Merit Two Honours
Season	No of Teams	Champions	Runners–up	Relegated Teams	League Name
2008–09	8	Fareham Heathens II	Alton 2nd XV	Isle of Wight 2nd	Hampshire Merit Two
2009–10	9	Alton 2nd XV	Southampton 3rd XV	Farnborough 2nd XV	Hampshire Merit Two
2010–11	12	Tottonians 4th XV	Lymington Mariners	No relegation	Hampshire Merit Two
2011–12	11	Tottonians 4th XV	Eastleigh II	Romsey 2nd XV, Andover 3rd XV	Hampshire Merit Two
2012–13	11	Winchester Knights	Andover II	Fareham Heathens II	Hampshire Merit Two
2013–14	12	Tottonians 4th XV	Petersfield II		Hampshire Merit Two
2014–15	Regional structure				
2015–16	Regional structure				
2016–17	12	Alresford 2nd XV	Stoneham		Solent League 3
Green backgrounds are promotion places.

- Most titles: Tottonians 4th XV (3)

== Merit Three Honours ==
Merit Three Honours
Season	No of Teams	Champions	Runners–up	League Name
2008–09	10	Eastleigh II	Ryde	Hampshire Merit Three
2009–10	11	Tottonians 4th XV	Portsmouth 4th XV	Hampshire Merit Three
2010–11	12	Aldershot & Fleet 2nd XV	Alresford 2nd XV	Hampshire Merit Three
2011–12	12	Fareham Heathens 3rd XV (Note: Not promoted as Fareham Heathens II in above division.)	Portsmouth 4th XV	Hampshire Merit Three
2012–13	12	Ventnor 2nd XV	Market House Pirates	Hampshire Merit Three
2013–14	14	Portsmouth Veterans	Fareham Heathens II	Hampshire Merit Three
2014–15	Regional structure			
2015–16	Regional structure			
2016–17	11	Tottonians 4th XV	Hook and Odiham 1st XV	Solent League 4
Green backgrounds are promotion places.

- Most titles: Tottonians 4th XV (2)

== See also ==
- Hampshire RFU
- English rugby union system
- Rugby union in England
