= Ashwin (surname) =

- Pronunciation: /əˈʃwɪn/
- Language: Sanskrit

Origin
- Region of origin: South Asia

Other names
- Alternative spelling: Ashvin, Aswin, Asveen

Ashwin or Aswin (Devanagari: अश्विन् aswin) is an Indian given name and surname. It is related to the name of the Ashvins, the divine twins of Vedic mythology, as well as to the name of the Hindu lunar month Ashvin.

People with the surname include:

- Bernard Ashwin (1896–1975), New Zealand public servant and economist
- Chris Ashwin (born 1987), English rugby union player
- Murugan Ashwin (born 1990), Indian cricketer
- Ravichandran Ashwin (born 1986), Indian cricketer
- Sumanth Ashwin, Indian Tollywood actor
