= 2008–09 Celtic League =

- Countries: Ireland; Scotland; Wales
- Champions: (Ireland) Munster (2nd title)
- Runners-up: (Scotland) Edinburgh
- Matches played: 90
- Attendance: 731,328 (average 8,126 per match)
- Tries scored: 352 (average 3.9 per match)
- Top point scorer: Felipe Contepomi (Leinster); James Hook (Ospreys) (161 points)
- Top try scorer: Thom Evans (Glasgow) (9 tries)

Official website
- www.rabodirectpro12.com

The 2008–09 Celtic League (known as the 2008–09 Magners League for sponsorship reasons) was the eighth Celtic League season and the third with Magners as title sponsor. The season began in September 2008 and ended in May 2009. Ten teams played each other on a home-and-away basis, with teams earning four points for a win, and a bonus point for scoring four or more tries in a match. Losing teams also earned a bonus point if they lost by seven points or less.

The ten competing teams consisted of the four Irish provinces, Munster, Leinster, Connacht and Ulster; two Scottish regions, Edinburgh Rugby and Glasgow Warriors; and four Welsh regions, Cardiff Blues, Newport Gwent Dragons, Ospreys and Scarlets. The Scarlets were originally known as the "Llanelli Scarlets", but renamed themselves at the start of the season, in order to reflect their regional identity.

Munster were crowned champions on 30 April 2009 after the Ospreys beat the Newport Gwent Dragons 27–18 but failed to claim a bonus point.

== Teams ==
Location of 2008–09 Celtic League teams in Great Britain and Ireland.
Winners; 2nd–4th place; Other teams.

Team	Stadium	Capacity	City, Area
(Wales) Cardiff Blues	Cardiff Arms Park	12,500	Cardiff, Wales
(Ireland) Connacht	Galway Sportsgrounds	5,500	Galway, Republic of Ireland
(Scotland) Edinburgh	Murrayfield Stadium	12,464 (Note: Although Murrayfield's full capacity is 67,800, only the lower section of the West Stand, with a capacity of 12,464, is generally opened for Edinburgh fixtures.)	Edinburgh, Scotland
(Scotland) Glasgow Warriors	Firhill Stadium	10,887	Glasgow, Scotland
(Ireland) Leinster	RDS Arena	18,500	Dublin, Republic of Ireland
(Ireland) Munster	Thomond Park; Musgrave Park	26,500; 8,300	Limerick, Republic of Ireland; Cork, Republic of Ireland
(Wales) Newport Gwent Dragons	Rodney Parade	12,000	Newport, Wales
(Wales) Ospreys	Liberty Stadium	20,500	Swansea, Wales
(Wales) Scarlets	Parc y Scarlets; Stradey Park	14,870; 10,800	Llanelli, Wales
(Ireland) Ulster	Ravenhill	12,800	Belfast, Northern Ireland

== Table ==
	Team	Pld	W	D	L	PF	PA	PD	TF	TA	Try bonus	Losing bonus	Pts
1	(Ireland) Munster	18	14	0	4	405	257	+148	49	23	6	1	63
2	(Scotland) Edinburgh	18	11	0	7	416	296	+120	40	30	6	5	55
3	(Ireland) Leinster	18	11	1	6	401	270	+131	38	20	4	2	52
4	(Wales) Ospreys	18	11	0	7	397	319	+78	39	28	3	5	52
5	(Wales) Scarlets	18	9	0	9	376	395	−19	41	46	3	1	40
6	(Wales) Cardiff Blues	18	8	1	9	322	361	−39	31	36	2	2	38
7	(Scotland) Glasgow Warriors	18	7	0	11	349	375	−26	36	41	4	5	37
8	(Ireland) Ulster	18	7	0	11	298	331	−33	30	33	2	6	36
9	(Wales) Newport Gwent Dragons	18	7	0	11	305	429	−124	26	39	1	4	33
10	(Ireland) Connacht	18	4	0	14	224	460	−236	20	54	1	3	20
Under the standard bonus point system, points are awarded as follows: 4 points for a win; 2 points for a draw; 1 bonus point for scoring 4 tries (or more) (Try bonus); 1 bonus point for losing by 7 points (or fewer) (Losing bonus)
Source: RaboDirect PRO12

== Results ==
=== Round 1 ===
5 September 2008
18:30

Connacht (Ireland)	3–16	(Wales) Ospreys
	Report

Sportsground
Attendance: 829

5 September 2008
19:05

Newport Gwent Dragons (Wales)	6–12	(Scotland) Glasgow Warriors
	Report

Rodney Parade
Attendance: 4,113

5 September 2008
19:30

Edinburgh (Scotland)	15–20	(Ireland) Munster
	Report

Murrayfield
Attendance: 5,443

5 September 2008
19:30

Ulster (Ireland)	9–16	(Wales) Scarlets
	Report

Ravenhill
Attendance: 7,368

6 September 2008
18:30

Cardiff Blues (Wales)	16–16	(Ireland) Leinster
	Report

Cardiff City Stadium
Attendance: 8,017

=== Welsh Round 1 ===
- All-Welsh Round 5 matches played mid-week to allow Welsh teams to play in the Anglo-Welsh Cup.

9 September 2008
19:35

Ospreys (Wales)	32–10	(Wales) Cardiff Blues
	Report

Liberty Stadium
Attendance: 8,499

10 September 2008
19:05

Newport Gwent Dragons (Wales)	25–27	(Wales) Scarlets
	Report

Rodney Parade
Attendance: 5,057

=== Round 2 ===
12 September 2008
19:05

Cardiff Blues (Wales)	16–15	(Ireland) Ulster
	Report

Cardiff City Stadium
Attendance: 8,619

12 September 2008
19:30

Glasgow Warriors (Scotland)	18–21	(Wales) Ospreys
	Report

Firhill Stadium
Attendance: 2,651

12 September 2008
19:30

Leinster (Ireland)	52–6	(Scotland) Edinburgh
	Report

RDS Arena
Attendance: 14,840

13 September 2008
17:30

Scarlets (Wales)	45–3	(Ireland) Connacht
	Report

Stradey Park
Attendance: 6,041

14 September 2008
18:00

Munster (Ireland)	50–6	(Wales) Newport Gwent Dragons
	Report

Musgrave Park
Attendance: 8,685

=== Round 3 ===
19 September 2008
18:30

Connacht (Ireland)	15–8	(Scotland) Glasgow Warriors
	Report

Sportsground
Attendance: 1,252

19 September 2008
19:30

Edinburgh (Scotland)	32–12	(Wales) Scarlets
	Report

Murrayfield
Attendance: 2,655

19 September 2008
19:30

Ulster (Ireland)	14–16	(Wales) Newport Gwent Dragons
	Report

Ravenhill
Attendance: 7,885

19 September 2008
19:35

Leinster (Ireland)	19–13	(Wales) Ospreys
	Report

RDS Arena
Attendance: 15,140

20 September 2008
19:30

Munster (Ireland)	28–20	(Wales) Cardiff Blues
	Report

Musgrave Park
Attendance: 8,685

=== Round 4 ===
26 September 2008
19:05

Cardiff Blues (Wales)	58–0	(Ireland) Connacht
	Report

Cardiff City Stadium
Attendance: 7,542

26 September 2008
19:30

Glasgow Warriors (Scotland)	34–20	(Wales) Scarlets
	Report

Firhill Stadium
Attendance: 2,450

26 September 2008
19:30

Newport Gwent Dragons (Wales)	11–9	(Scotland) Edinburgh
	Report

Rodney Parade
Attendance: 4,676

27 September 2008
17:30

Ospreys (Wales)	43–0	(Ireland) Ulster
	Report

Liberty Stadium
Attendance: 7,225

28 September 2008
19:00

Leinster (Ireland)	0–18	(Ireland) Munster
	Report

RDS Arena
Attendance: 18,500

=== Round 5 ===
3 October 2008
19:30

Ulster (Ireland)	13–9	(Scotland) Edinburgh
	Report

Ravenhill
Attendance: 8,418

4 October 2008
19:00

Munster (Ireland)	25–17	(Scotland) Glasgow Warriors
	Report

Thomond Park Stadium
Attendance: 22,885

5 October 2008
18:00

Connacht (Ireland)	19–18	(Ireland) Leinster
	Report

Sportsground
Attendance: 2,820

=== Round 6 ===
24 October 2008
18:30

Connacht (Ireland)	14–27	(Scotland) Edinburgh
	Report

Sportsground
Attendance: 1,868

24 October 2008
19:30

Glasgow Warriors (Scotland)	15–12	(Ireland) Leinster
	Report

Firhill Stadium
Attendance: 2,523

25 October 2008
19:30

Ulster (Ireland)	22–6	(Ireland) Munster
	Report

Ravenhill
Attendance: 10,058

=== Round 7 ===
28 November 2008
19:05

Scarlets (Wales)	16–18	(Ireland) Munster
	Report

Parc y Scarlets
Attendance: 8,435

28 November 2008
19:30

Edinburgh (Scotland)	32–16	(Wales) Ospreys
	Report

Murrayfield
Attendance: 2,670
Referee: John Lacey (Ireland)

28 November 2008
19:30

Glasgow Warriors (Scotland)	28–0	(Wales) Cardiff Blues
	Report

Firhill Stadium
Attendance: 2,364

28 November 2008
19:30

Ulster (Ireland)	53–13	(Ireland) Connacht
	Report

Ravenhill
Attendance: 8,841

29 November 2008
17:30

Leinster (Ireland)	29–13	(Wales) Newport Gwent Dragons
	Report

RDS Arena
Attendance: 15,240

=== Welsh Round 2 ===
- All-Welsh Round 6 matches played mid-week to allow Welsh teams to play in the Anglo-Welsh Cup.

19 December 2008
19:35

Newport Gwent Dragons (Wales)	30–24	(Wales) Ospreys
	Report

Rodney Parade
Attendance: 7,138

20 December 2008
17:30

Scarlets (Wales)	27–13	(Wales) Cardiff Blues
	Report

Parc y Scarlets
Attendance: 7,610

=== Round 8 ===
26 December 2008
14:05

Newport Gwent Dragons (Wales)	19–21	(Wales) Cardiff Blues
	Report

Rodney Parade
Attendance: 10,180

27 December 2008
17:30

Ospreys (Wales)	20–6	(Wales) Scarlets
	Report

Liberty Stadium
Attendance: 20,520

27 December 2008
19:30

Ulster (Ireland)	13–21	(Ireland) Leinster
	Report

Ravenhill
Attendance: 13,500

28 December 2008
18:00

Connacht (Ireland)	12–6	(Ireland) Munster
	Report

Sportsground
Attendance: 5,000

==== 1872 Cup 1st round ====
26 December 2008
19:30

Edinburgh (Scotland)	39–6	(Scotland) Glasgow Warriors
	Report

Murrayfield
Attendance: 12,534

=== Round 9 ===
31 December 2008
14:05

Cardiff Blues (Wales)	12–16	(Wales) Ospreys
	Report

Cardiff City Stadium
Attendance: 12,813

1 January 2009
17:15

Scarlets (Wales)	29–24	(Wales) Newport Gwent Dragons
	Report

Parc y Scarlets
Attendance: 7,050

2 January 2009
19:30

Leinster (Ireland)	26–18	(Ireland) Connacht
	Report

RDS Arena
Attendance: 16,350

3 January 2009
19:30

Munster (Ireland)	11–37	(Ireland) Ulster
	Report

Thomond Park Stadium
Attendance: 25,623

==== 1872 Cup 2nd round ====
2 January 2009
15:00

Glasgow Warriors (Scotland)	25–20	(Scotland) Edinburgh
	Report

Firhill Stadium
Attendance: 6,665

=== Round 10 ===
9 January 2009
18:30

Connacht (Ireland)	14–17	(Wales) Scarlets
	Report

Sportsground
Attendance: 2,063

9 January 2009
19:05

Ospreys (Wales)	21–25	(Ireland) Munster
	Report

Liberty Stadium
Attendance: 9,003

9 January 2009
19:30

Glasgow Warriors (Scotland)	20–25	(Wales) Newport Gwent Dragons
	Report

Firhill Stadium
Attendance: 2,217

9 January 2009
19:45

Edinburgh (Scotland)	21–15	(Ireland) Ulster
	Report

Murrayfield
Attendance: 3,393

10 January 2009
19:30

Leinster (Ireland)	21–20	(Wales) Cardiff Blues
	Report

RDS Arena
Attendance: 14,470

=== Round 11 ===
20 February 2009
19:05

Cardiff Blues (Wales)	34–30	(Scotland) Glasgow Warriors
	Report

Cardiff City Stadium
Attendance: 7,603

21 February 2009
17:30

Scarlets (Wales)	17–31	(Ireland) Leinster
	Report

Parc y Scarlets
Attendance: 6,436

21 February 2009
19:30

Munster (Ireland)	28–14	(Scotland) Edinburgh
	Report

Musgrave Park
Attendance: 8,685

22 February 2009
14:15

Ospreys (Wales)	22–10	(Ireland) Connacht
	Report

Liberty Stadium
Attendance: 6,127

22 February 2009
16:10

Newport Gwent Dragons (Wales)	26–16	(Ireland) Ulster
	Report

Rodney Parade
Attendance: 6,112

=== Round 12 ===
6 March 2009
18:30

Connacht (Ireland)	14–19	(Wales) Cardiff Blues
	Report

Sportsground
Attendance: 1,373

6 March 2009
19:05

Ospreys (Wales)	8–13	(Ireland) Leinster
	Report

Liberty Stadium
Attendance: 8,046

7 March 2009
17:30

Newport Gwent Dragons (Wales)	9–20	(Ireland) Munster
	Report

Rodney Parade
Attendance: 6,865

7 March 2009
19:30

Ulster (Ireland)	12–0	(Scotland) Glasgow Warriors
	Report

Ravenhill
Attendance: 8,286

8 March 2009
16:10

Scarlets (Wales)	13–6	(Scotland) Edinburgh
	Report

Parc y Scarlets
Attendance: 6,302

=== Round 13 ===
27 March 2009
19:30

Edinburgh (Scotland)	32–5	(Ireland) Connacht
	Report

Murrayfield
Attendance: 2,208

27 March 2009
19:45

Glasgow Warriors (Scotland)	13–26	(Ireland) Munster
	Report

Firhill Stadium
Attendance: 3,615

29 March 2009
17:30

Leinster (Ireland)	32–6	(Ireland) Ulster
	Report

RDS Arena
Attendance: 15,940

=== Round 14 ===
3 April 2009
18:30

Connacht (Ireland)	39–17	(Wales) Newport Gwent Dragons
	Report

Sportsground
Attendance: 1,272

3 April 2009
19:30

Edinburgh (Scotland)	16–3	(Wales) Cardiff Blues
	Report

Murrayfield
Attendance: 2,540

3 April 2009
19:35

Ulster (Ireland)	13–16	(Wales) Ospreys
	Report

Ravenhill
Attendance: 9,600

4 April 2009
17:30

Scarlets (Wales)	21–38	(Scotland) Glasgow Warriors
	Report

Parc y Scarlets
Attendance: 6,103

4 April 2009
19:30

Munster (Ireland)	22–5	(Ireland) Leinster
	Report

Thomond Park Stadium
Attendance: 26,043

=== Round 15 ===
17 April 2009
19:30

Glasgow Warriors (Scotland)	19–20	(Ireland) Ulster
	Report

Firhill Stadium
Attendance: 2,960

17 April 2009
19:45

Edinburgh (Scotland)	27–16	(Ireland) Leinster
	Report

Murrayfield
Attendance: 2,747

18 April 2009
17:30

Scarlets (Wales)	19–28	(Wales) Ospreys
	Report

Parc y Scarlets
Attendance: 11,444

18 April 2009
19:30

Munster (Ireland)	25–10	(Ireland) Connacht
	Report

Thomond Park Stadium
Attendance: 26,043

=== Round 16 ===
24 April 2009
19:30

Ulster (Ireland)	9–11	(Wales) Cardiff Blues
	Report

Ravenhill
Attendance: 7,809

24 April 2009
19:35

Munster (Ireland)	29–10	(Wales) Scarlets
	Report

Musgrave Park
Attendance: 8,685

25 April 2009
19:30

Ospreys (Wales)	30–32	(Scotland) Edinburgh
	Report

Liberty Stadium
Attendance: 6,015

25 April 2009
19:35

Leinster (Ireland)	36–13	(Scotland) Glasgow Warriors
	Report

RDS Arena
Attendance: 10,910

26 April 2009
17:05

Newport Gwent Dragons (Wales)	27–14	(Ireland) Connacht
	Report

Rodney Parade
Attendance: 5,233

=== Rearranged fixtures ===
- Round 13 match rescheduled to allow Ospreys to play in the Anglo-Welsh Cup semi-final.

30 April 2009
19:05

Ospreys (Wales)	27–18	(Wales) Newport Gwent Dragons
	Report

Liberty Stadium
Attendance: 5,010

- Round 15 match rescheduled to allow Cardiff Blues to play in the Anglo-Welsh Cup final.

6 May 2009
19:05

Cardiff Blues (Wales)	26–12	(Wales) Newport Gwent Dragons
	Report

Cardiff City Stadium
Attendance: 6,608

=== Round 17 ===
8 May 2009
19:00

Connacht (Ireland)	12–14	(Ireland) Ulster
	Report

Sportsground
Attendance: 1,425

8 May 2009
19:45

Leinster (Ireland)	45–8	(Wales) Scarlets
	Report

RDS Arena
Attendance: 11,160

9 May 2009
14:30

Edinburgh (Scotland)	43–3	(Wales) Newport Gwent Dragons
	Report

Murrayfield
Attendance: 2,105

10 May 2009
14:35

Ospreys (Wales)	34–23	(Scotland) Glasgow Warriors
	Report

Liberty Stadium
Attendance: 5,204

10 May 2009
16:35

Cardiff Blues (Wales)	20–12	(Ireland) Munster
	Report

Cardiff City Stadium
Attendance: 7,428

=== Rearranged fixture ===
- Round 13 match rescheduled to allow Cardiff Blues to play in the Anglo-Welsh Cup semi-final.

13 May 2009
19:35

Cardiff Blues (Wales)	9–30	(Wales) Scarlets
	Report

Cardiff City Stadium
Attendance: 8,212

=== Round 18 ===
15 May 2009
19:45

Glasgow Warriors (Scotland)	30–9	(Ireland) Connacht
	Report

Firhill Stadium
Attendance: 1,851

15 May 2009
19:45

Munster (Ireland)	36–10	(Wales) Ospreys
	Report

Thomond Park Stadium
Attendance: 26,043

16 May 2009
17:30

Newport Gwent Dragons (Wales)	18–9	(Ireland) Leinster
	Report

Rodney Parade
Attendance: 5,426

16 May 2009
19:30

Scarlets (Wales)	43–17	(Ireland) Ulster
	Report

Parc y Scarlets
Attendance: 6,219

17 May 2009
15:35

Cardiff Blues (Wales)	14–36	(Scotland) Edinburgh
	Report

Cardiff City Stadium
Attendance: 11,212

== Leading scorers ==
Note: Flags to the left of player names indicate national team as has been defined under IRB eligibility rules, or primary nationality for players who have not yet earned international senior caps. Players may hold one or more non-IRB nationalities.

=== Top points scorers ===
Rank	Player	Club	Points
1	(Argentina) Felipe Contepomi	(Ireland) Leinster	161
1	(Wales) James Hook	(Wales) Ospreys	161
3	(Scotland) Chris Paterson	(Scotland) Edinburgh	159
4	(Ireland) Ian Keatley	(Ireland) Connacht	124
5	(Scotland) Dan Parks	(Scotland) Glasgow Warriors	117

=== Top try scorers ===
Rank	Player	Club	Tries
1	(Scotland) Thom Evans	(Scotland) Glasgow Warriors	9
2	(Ireland) Fionn Carr	(Ireland) Connacht	8
2	(Ireland) Keith Earls	(Ireland) Munster	8
4	(Scotland) Ben Cairns	(Scotland) Edinburgh	7
4	(Ireland) Luke Fitzgerald	(Ireland) Leinster	7

== Broadcast rights ==
Television rights for the league are split between three broadcasters, BBC Wales, S4C and Setanta Sports. BBC Wales and S4C continues to cover the Pro12.
