= Counties 5 Hampshire =

English rugby union league

Hampshire 3
- Current season or competition: 2021–22 Hampshire 3
- Sport: Rugby union
- Number of teams: 12
- Country: England
- Website: englandrugby.com

Counties 5 Hampshire formerly known as Hampshire 3 is an English level 11 Rugby Union league for teams based in Hampshire and the Isle of Wight. The league is operated as a Hampshire RFU domestic competition. Hampshire RFU publishes its own regulations, fixtures, promotion/relegation arrangements and competition administration for Counties 5.

Historically promoted teams moved up to Hampshire 2 and relegated teams dropped to Hampshire 4 however post Adult Competition Review promoted teams now go to Counties 4 Hampshire.

== Teams for 2026–27 ==
Departing were Sandown & Shanklin II, Locksheath Pumas, Bognor II and New Milton & District II all promoted to Counties 4 Hampshire.

Team	Ground	City/Area	Previous season
Andover III	Foxcotte Lane	Andover, Hampshire	
Basingstoke III	Down Grange	Basingstoke, Hampshire	
Chichester II	Oaklands Park	Chichester, West Sussex	
Farnborough	Tilebarn Close	Farnborough, Hampshire	
Farnham IV	Wilkinson Way	Farnham, Surrey	
Fareham Heathens II	Cams Alders Recreation Centre	Fareham, Hampshire	
Kingsclere	Field Gate Dr	Newbury, Berkshire	
Tottonians III	Water Lane	Totton, Hampshire	
United Services Portsmouth II	Burnaby Road	Portsmouth, Hampshire	
Winchester IV	North Walls Park	Winchester, Hampshire	

Locations of the 2026–27 Counties 5 Hampshire teams in Hampshire & Surrey

== Teams for 2021–22 ==
The teams competing in 2021–22 achieved their places in the league based on performances in 2019–20, the 'previous season' column in the table below refers to that season, not 2020–21.

A combined Millbrook / Stoneham side were Hampshire 3 champions in 2019–20, they were replaced by Millbrook 2XV for 2021–22. Trojans II replaced Trojans III.

Team	Ground	City/Area	Previous season
Alresford II	Alresford Recreation Centre	New Alresford, Hampshire	Hampshire 3 (2nd)
Andover III	Foxcotte Lane	Andover, Hampshire	Hampshire 3 (7th)
Basingstoke II	Down Grange	Basingstoke, Hampshire	Hampshire 2 (12th)
Hook & Odiham	Rotherwick Playing Fields	Hook, Hampshire	Hampshire 2 (10th)
Isle Of Wight 2nd XV	Footways	Wootton, Isle of Wight	Hampshire 2 (14th)
Locksheath Pumas II	Brookfield Community School	Locks Heath, Fareham, Hampshire	Hampshire 3 (9th)
Lymington Mariners	Woodside Park	Lymington, Hampshire	Hampshire 3 (6th)
Millbrook RFC 2nd XV	5 Acres	Southampton, Hampshire	
Overton II	The Old Cricket Ground	Laverstoke, Hampshire	Hampshire 2 (11th)
Tottonians Vets XV	Water Lane	Totton, Hampshire	Hampshire 3 (10th)
Trojans II	Stoneham Lane	Eastleigh, Hampshire	
Winchester Knights	North Walls Park	Winchester, Hampshire	Hampshire 3 (5th)

Locations of the 2021–22 Hampshire 3 teams in Hampshire & Isle of Wight

== Season 2020–21 ==
On 30 October the RFU announced that a decision had been taken to cancel Adult Competitive Leagues (National League 1 and below) for the 2020/21 season meaning Hampshire 3 was not contested.

== Teams for 2019–20 ==
Team	Ground	City/Area	Previous season
Aldershot & Fleet	Aldershot Park	Aldershot, Hampshire	Hampshire 2 (11th)
Alresford II	Alresford Recreation Centre	New Alresford, Hampshire	Hampshire 3 (4th)
Alton II	Antsey Park	Alton, Hampshire	Hampshire 4 (10th)
Andover III	Foxcotte Lane	Andover, Hampshire	Hampshire 3 (9th)
Eastleigh III	The Hub	Eastleigh, Hampshire	Hampshire 4 (1st)
Fareham Heathens II	Cams Alders Recreation Centre	Fareham, Hampshire	Hampshire 2 (12th)
Farnham IV	Wilkinson Way	Farnham, Surrey	Hampshire 4 (5th)
Fordingbridge II	The Recreation Ground	Fordingbridge, Hampshire	Hampshire 4 (2nd)
Kingsclere	The Fieldgate Centre	Kingsclere, Hampshire	Hampshire 3 (6th)
Locksheath Pumas II	Brookfield Community School	Locks Heath, Fareham, Hampshire	Hampshire 4 (3rd)
Lymington Mariners	Woodside Park	Lymington, Hampshire	Hampshire 3 (3rd)
Millbrook / Stoneham RFC	University of Southampton	Southampton, Hampshire	Hampshire 3 (5th)
New Milton III	Ashley Recreation Ground	Ashley, New Milton, Hampshire	Dorset & Wilts 3 South (1st)
Portsmouth III	The Rugby Camp	Portsmouth, Hampshire	Hampshire 3 (8th)
Sandown & Shanklin II	The Fairway Ground	Sandown, Isle of Wight	Hampshire 4 (4th)
Tottonians 4th	Water Lane	Totton, Hampshire	Hampshire 4 (8th)
Trojans III	Stoneham Lane	Eastleigh, Hampshire	Hampshire 4 (11th)
Winchester Knights	North Walls Park	Winchester, Hampshire	Hampshire 2 (6th)
Ventnor II	Watcombe Bottom	Ventnor, Isle of Wight	Hampshire 4 (9th)

Locations of the 2019–20 Hampshire 3 teams in Hampshire & Surrey
Locations of the 2019-20 Hampshire 3 teams on the Isle of Wight

== See also ==
- Hampshire RFU
- English rugby union system
- Rugby union in England
