= Ashwini =

Ashwini, Ashvini, Aswini, or Asvini may refer to:

- Ashvini, the first nakshatra (lunar mansion) of Hindu astrology
- Ashwini (film), a 1991 Indian Telugu-language film
- "Ashwini Ye Na", a 1987 Marathi-language song in Gammat Jammat

== People ==
- Ashwini (actress) (1967–2012), Indian actress
- Ashwini Akkunji (born 1987), Indian athlete
- Ashwini Bhave, Indian actress
- Ashwini Bhat (born 1980), Indian-American ceramic artist
- Ashwini Bhatt (1936–2012), Gujarati-language novelist from Indian
- Ashwini Bhide-Deshpande (born 1960), Hindustani classical music vocalist
- Ashwini Ekbote (1972–2016), Indian theatre and screen actress and classical dancer
- Ashwiny Iyer Tiwari, Indian filmmaker
- Ashwini Kalsekar (born 1970), Indian film and television actress
- Ashwini Kapoor (born 1965), Indian cricketer
- Ashwini Kumar Dutta (1856–1923), Indian educationist, philanthropist, social reformer and patriot
- Ashwini Nachappa (born 1967), Indian athlete and actress
- Ashwini Ponnappa (born 1989), Indian badminton player
- Ashwini Roy Sarkar, Indian politician from Bharatiya Janata Party, Assam
- Ashwini Sharma, Indian politician from Bharatiya Janata Party, Punjab
- Ashwini Vaishnaw, (born 1970), Indian politician, Minister for Railways
- Ashvini Yardi, Indian producer of Bollywood films
- Ash Ambihaipahar, born Ashvini Ambihaipahar, Australia politician
- C. Ashwini Dutt, Indian film producer in Telugu cinema
- Simone Ashley, born Simone Ashwini Pillai, British-Indian actress

== See also ==
- Ashwin (disambiguation)
