= Ashwin (given name) =

Male given name

- Gender: Male
- Language: Sanskrit

Origin
- Region of origin: South Asia

Other names
- Alternative spelling: Ashvin, Ashwin, Asveen, Aswin

Ashwin or Asveen or Ashveen (Devanagari: अश्विन् ashwin) is a given name most commonly used in India. It is related to the name of the Ashvins, the divine twins of Vedic mythology, as well as to the name of the Hindu lunar month Ashvin.

== People with the name ==
- Ashwin Sanghi (born 1969), Indian writer
- Ashwin Mushran, Indian actor and voice actor
- Ashwin Kakumanu, Indian actor
- Ashwin Dani (1943/1944–2023) Indian businessman
- Ashwin Sood (born 1967), English-born Canadian musician and drummer
- Ashwin Shekhar Indian actor
- Ashwin Kumar (born 1987), Indian actor
- Ashwin Adhin (born 1980), Surinamese educator and politician
- Ashwin Ram (born 1960), Indian-American computer scientist
- Ashwin Choksi (1944–2018) Indian businessman
- Ashwin Batish (born 1951), Indian musician
- Ashwin Sundar (1985–2017), Indian racing driver
- Ashwin Chitale, Indian actor
- Ashwin Mahesh, Indian urbanist, journalist, politician and social technologist
- Ashwin Navin (born c. 1977) is an American entrepreneur
- Ashwin Hebbar (born 1995) is an Indian cricketer
- Ashwin Balrak (born 1975) Surinamese-Dutch kickboxer and lawyer
- Ashwin Gumaste, Indian computer engineer
- Ashwin Joshi, Indian politician
- Herbert Ashwin Budd (1881–1950), was a British painter
- Ashwin Willemse (born 1981) South African rugby union player
- Ashwin Balachand Mehta, Indian cardiologist
- Ashwin Das (born 1995) Indian cricketer
- Ashwin Yadav (1987–2021) Indian cricketer
- Ashwin Scott (born 1985) South African rugby union player
