= Phill Davies =

English rugby union player

Phill Davies (born April 30, 1981, in Chester), is a former England Under 19's & 21's rugby union player who ended his career in 2011 at Section Paloise a French rugby union club from Pau, Pyrénées-Atlantiques currently competing in Rugby Pro D2. Phill Davies also played for Harlequins and Sale Sharks in the Guinness Premiership, as well as Aviron Bayonnais in The French Top14 competition.

Phill Davies' position of choice was back-row forward/flanker.

Phill Davies started his professional career in 2000 signing at Harlequins for the 2000-01 Zurich Premiership. During this season Harlequins won the Parker Pen European Shield competition beating French Top16 team Narbonne in the final, they also reached the final of the Tetley Bitter League Cup competition coming runners-up to Newcastle Falcons.

For the 2001-02 Phill Davies signed for fellow Zurich Premiership side Sale Sharks remaining there until January 2005 when he moved on loan to French Top14 team Aviron Bayonnais. During his time at Sale the Sharks won both the 2001-02 & 2004-05 Parker Pen European Shields against Pontypridd and Section Paloise, respectively, as well as finishing 2nd in the Zurich Premiership in 2002. Whilst at the Sharks Davies also represented England 0-21s in both the 5 Nations Championship and the Under 21s World Cup held in Johannesburg, South Africa.

At the start of the 2005–06 season Davies made his loan move to Aviron Bayonnais permanent and remained at the club for a further 2 seasons, signing in 2007 for Guinness Premiership side Harlequins. During his time at Harlequins the club finished 2nd in the 2008-09 Guinness Premiership as well as reaching the semi-finals of the Heineken Cup. In 2009-10 Phill Davies signed for Section Paloise (Pau) in the French Pro D2, before retiring professionally at the start of 2011.
