= Nomads RFC =

English rugby football club

- Full name: Southsea Nomads Rugby Football Club
- Founded: 1978
- Ground(s): Cockleshell Community Sports Club, Southsea, Portsmouth
- League(s): Hampshire 4

Official website
- [ www.nomadsrfc.com/%20www.nomadsrfc.com]]

Nomads Rugby Football Club play in Counties 4 League, England.

== History ==
Nomads RFC, now known as Southsea Nomads RFC, was formed in May 1978 by a group of players who had all been members of the now defunct Portsmouth Civil Service RFC. That club disbanded at the end of season ‘77-78 and some players not wishing to join other local clubs decided to form one of their own. So with a meeting held at the “Old House at Home” Paulsgrove, Nomads RFC was born.

The name was chosen because the team had no home and the logo of a Snail wearing a scrum cap soon followed, as a snail is a Nomad who carries its home on its back.

Some of the original members are still around the club (Barry Bridgman, Colin Few ~ President, Ken Walker, Garry Barter, Nicky Cadle, Terry Welsh).

The Nomads have had several temporary homes over the years; the “John Barleycorn”, Great Southsea St., which was its first home and now has been turned into a private dwelling, the Royal Sailors Home Club, Queen Street, from 1981, and Watersedge Park Community Centre which became its clubhouse from 1987.

Our Current ground is Cockleshell Community Sports Club which Nomads Share the site with Meon Milton Football Club, Portsmouth Community Cricket Club and Mayville High School.

our former grounds include, The John Barleycorn, Great Southsea Street Farlington Playing Fields Alexandra Park, Portsmouth Eastern Road Sailing Centre Ground Portsmouth University Grounds Langstone, Portsmouth St Johns Playing Fields, Drayton, Portsmouth Warblington School, Warblington

They were founder members of the then Courage Leagues in 1989, forming part of the Hampshire league set up.

They were the first club in Hampshire to form and run a Women's team, though this team disbanded at the end of the 1999–2000 season.

They have run three sides for Men in the past (including a veterans team) but are reduced to two now as there seems to be a general reduction in the numbers of people playing Rugby.

Kevin Darnley of Portsmouth started with Nomads, as did Douggie Setchell of Gosport, Robbie Allsopp, Tony Armstrong of Havant, and most recently John Brothers of Trojans.

The side was (in 2011–2012) in Hampshire Division One, led by skipper Chris Groves.

== Club Motto ==
Relinque numquam mulsum adiacentem, which, very roughly, translates to "never leave your beer loafing".

== Club Honours ==
- Hampshire 2 champions: 2010–11.

== Notable former players ==
- Tobias Cutler

== See also ==
- Hampshire Rugby
- Nomads Rugby
- Rugby Union
