= Chris Ashwin =

English rugby union player

- Born: Chris Ashwin; 19 November 1987 (age 38) Gloucester, United Kingdom
- Height: 1.83 m (6 ft 0 in)
- Weight: 85 kg (13 st 5 lb)
- University: University of Bath

Rugby union career
- Position: Fly-half
- Current team: Bristol
Amateur team(s)
Years	Team	Apps	(Points)
- TeamBath
–	Winchester RFC		
Senior career
Years	Team	Apps	(Points)
2008–09	Bristol	2	(0)

Chris Ashwin born 19 November 1987 in England is a rugby union player who played for Bristol in the Guinness Premiership. He plays as a fly-half.
