= Brookfield Community School, Fareham =

Brookfield Community School

Location
- Brook Lane; Fareham, Hampshire, SO31 7DU; United Kingdom; 50.8659°N 1.2829°W

Information
- Type: Community school
- Motto: Aspire, ACT, Achieve
- Local authority: Hampshire
- Department for Education URN: 116419 Tables
- Ofsted: Reports
- Head teacher: Stuart Parkes
- Gender: Mixed
- Age: 11 to 16
- Enrolment: 1800
- Houses: Attenborough, Nightingale, Mercury, Austen, Windsor, Newton, Seacole
- Colour: Navy Blue
- Website: https://www.brookfield.hants.sch.uk/

Brookfield Community School is a large state-funded secondary school located in the Locks Heath ward of the Borough of Fareham. Brookfield serves 6 feeder schools in the local area: Locks Heath Junior School, Park Gate Primary School, Hook-With-Warsash Church of England Academy, St John the Baptist CofE Primary school, Sarisbury Church of England Junior School, and St Anthony's Catholic Primary School.

Brookfield is one of the largest co-educational, comprehensive secondary schools in Hampshire; the school currently has approximately 1883 students on roll and there are approximately 120 teachers, 12 LSAs and 6 cover supervisors employed at the school. The school teaches years 7 to 11.

== Status ==
Ofsted made the following key judgements following school inspection on 11 March 2025: Quality of education: Good, Behaviour and attitudes: Good; Personal development: Outstanding; Leadership and management: Good.

Subjects taught include core subjects such as English, Maths, Biology, Chemistry, and Physics, but also offer the following: Art, Business Studies, Enterprise and Marketing, Food Preparation and Nutrition, Hospitality and Catering, Citizenship, Computer Science, Creative iMedia, Dance, Drama, Performing Arts, French, Geography, German, Design and Technology, Health and Social Care, History, Music, Physical Education, Sports Studies, Photography, Religious Studies, Spanish, Statistics, and Textiles.

== School buildings ==
There are 17 computer suites around the School, and specialist rooms for catering, science and technology.
