= Ryan Westren =

English rugby union player (born 1984)

- Born: 26 October 1984 (age 42) Truro, Cornwall
- School: Colston's Collegiate
- Notable relative(s): Murray Westren, Phil Westren

Rugby union career
- Position: Centre
- Current team: Launceston
Senior career
Years	Team	Apps	(Points)
2003-04	Mounts Bay		
2004-06, 2011	Cornish Pirates	5	(5)
2006-11, 2013-	Launceston	310	(587)
2012-13	London Scottish	17	(20)
- Correct as of 26 April 2020
International career
Years	Team	Apps	(Points)
2007-10, 2014	Cornwall	18	(15)
- Correct as of 1 June 2014

Ryan Westren (born 1984) is a Cornish rugby union player who is currently a player-coach at Launceston, where he plays at outside centre. A club legend at Launceston, he previously played professional rugby union with Cornish Pirates and London Scottish, as well as captaining Cornwall in the county championships. His brother, Murray Westren, is also a rugby player, while their father, Phil Westren, played for Cornish Pirates when they were known as Penzance/Newlyn.

== Career ==
=== Early career ===
Ryan Western was born in Truro, Cornwall on 26 October 1984 and attended Colston's Collegiate in Bristol between 2001-03. On leaving school he returned to Cornwall to play for Mounts Bay before signing for the Cornish Pirates (then Penzance/Newlyn) in 2004. Westren found chances hard to come by with the Pirates, being limited to just two league appearances (both from the substitutes bench) during the 2005-06 season.

=== First spell with Launceston ===
Having struggled for games in Penzance, Westren decided to sign for Launceston for the 2006-07 season, playing a division below the Pirates in National Division Two (third tier). He made his Launceston debut in a 26-15 victory over Henley Hawks at Polson Bridge on 26 September 2006, with his first try for the club following on the 30th of that month, at home against Manchester in a 22-14 win. Westren would go on to feature in 23 league games that season, scoring 3 tries, as his club were promoted in second place behind champions Esher. In achieving promotion to tier 2, the east Cornish club had reached the highest level in the club's history. Due to his performances for Launceston, Westren was called up to the Cornwall senior side taking part in the County Championship Shield (now known as plate) - having been relegated from the top division at the end of the previous championships. He made his debut on 5 May 2007 against Somerset at Bridgwater, scoring a try in a 14-60 defeat. Although Westren would go on to feature in the remaining two pool games (scoring another try), he was unable to help Cornwall to reach the final as they finished second in their group behind Somerset.

The 2007-08 season saw Launceston playing in an extremely strong National One (one division below the Premiership) featuring clubs such as Northampton Saints and Exeter Chiefs. An un-used substitute for the first game of the campaign - a 12-26 defeat against Cornish Pirates - Westren would go on to play in all of the remaining 29 league matches, scoring 1 try. Although Launceston were competitive in the division, they conceded far too many points, resulting in them finishing in 16th place and being relegated straight back to National Two. Launceston also had a decent run in the EDF Energy Trophy going as far the quarter-finals before losing 3-71 away to Nottingham. The highlight of this cup run was a 61-15 home win against Blackheath, a game in which Westren scored 2 tries. Relegation was tempered by much improve performances by Cornwall in the county championships - Westren playing in all three pool games a scoring a try as his county made the Shield final (and with it promotion to the top division for the following year). Westren started in the final at Twickenham Stadium but was unable to help his team to victory as they went down 11-22 to Northumberland.

Back in tier 3 after just one season, Westren featured regularly for a Launceston side that stabilized themselves in National Two, with a decent ratio of 7 tries from 21 league appearances as his team finished in 7th place. The summer of 2009 would see him recalled by Cornwall, now back in the top tier of county championship rugby, and he played in all three games as his county missed out on a place in the final after losing the last game away to Gloucestershire 14-31. The 2009-10 season saw National Two rebranded as National League 1 due to widespread RFU changes, and Launceston improved to a 3rd-place finish, with Westren getting a career best (so far) 12 tries during the campaign. The summer of 2010 saw a return to county championship rugby, and although Westren was once more involved in all three games, defeats against Devon and Gloucestershire meant that Cornwall had to be content with a third-place finish - safe from relegation but nowhere near to qualifying for the final.

The 2010-11 season did not start particularly well for Launceston who began their National League 1 campaign at minus points due to the club going into voluntary liquidation in the summer as a result of financial trouble. Once underway Launceston played some good rugby and Westren was quick off the mark, grabbing his first tries of the season with a brace against rivals Redruth in an excellent 40-15 home victory on 11 September 2010. Despite playing in a team that were almost certain to be relegated, Westren formed a strong partnership with fellow centre Palepoi Nonu and together they terrorised defences all season. Westren was particularly deadly towards the end of the season when he scored 10 tries in just 5 games, a figure which included a hat-trick against Blackheath, taking his final total to 24 in the league, joint top with David Howells from London Scottish, and the best of his career. As well as scoring tries he also shared kicking duties with Mal Robert, with 186 points scored overall making him the club's top point scorer and 8th highest in the league. Despite Westren's heroics in the end the 20 point deduction was too much to overcome and Launceston were relegated in 16th place.

=== Professional rugby ===
After five seasons with Launceston, Westren decided to try his luck at the Cornish Pirates, joining them for the start of the 2011-12 season in what would be his second spell at the club. When he had first played at the club they had been semi-professional and known as Penzance & Newlyn, but since their re-branding they had gone full-time and would be his first professional club. The switch to the professional ranks would be a difficult one for him to transition to, particularly at a Pirates side that were doing well in the RFU Championship and where the competition for places was intense. As a result, Westren found games hard to come by, with appearances restricted to a sole league appearance from the substitutes bench in October and a handful of games in the British and Irish Cup, which included a try against Plymouth Albion.

With opportunities limited at the Pirates, Westren decided to return to Launceston, joining them on loan in November. Back at Polson Bridge, he once more showcase his try scoring ability, with three tries from three games in National League 2 South during this spell. In December, Championship club London Scottish came in for Westren and he decided to swap Cornwall for London. He made his London Scottish debut on 10 December 2011, a 20-25 home defeat against Doncaster Knights, and scored his first try early in the new year, helping his club to a 21-17 home win against Plymouth Albion on 7 January 2012. Westren would go on to feature regularly for London Scottish, making 15 appearances and scoring 4 tries in all, as he helped them to avoid relegation with Esher going down instead.

On the basis of Westren's performances for the club and keeping them in the Championship, London Scottish decided to resign him for the 2012-13 season. A groin injury caused him to miss Cornwall's county championship games in the summer and hampered his pre-season, meaning that he did not make a league appearance with London Scottish until late September, coming on as a substitute. He would appear in one more league game that season on the 28 September 2012, a 9-54 defeat away to Nottingham. This would be Westren's last game for the Exiles as his season was ended due to injury.

=== Back at Polson Bridge ===
Westren's injury problems meant that he was unable to secure another contract with London Scottish and in the summer of 2013 he decided to return to his former club Launceston in what would be his third spell with the Polson Bridge outfit. Despite an emphasis on recovering from injury, Westren still managed to appear in all 30 of Launceston's league games, scoring 9 tries as he helped them to a 12th-place finish, 3 points clear of the relegation zone. He also picked up some silverware that year as Launceston's league results against Redruth meant that they claimed the Cornwall Super Cup via an aggregate score of 39 - 28. You would think that after a long season back from injury Westren could have done with a break but his recovery was so good that he was selected by Cornwall for the annual Tamar Cup against Devon, before being drafted into the squad to take part in the 2014 Bill Beaumont Cup in May. Westren featured in all Cornwall's games in the competition as they made it to the final at Twickenham Stadium but he was unable to pick up a winners medal for the first time as his side went down 26-36 to a very strong Lancashire side.

After being ever present during the 2014-15 season in a Launceston side that finished a steady 10th in the league, events during the summer would spell the beginning of a tough time for both Westren and his club. The relegation of Plymouth Albion from the RFU Championship saw an exodus of Launceston players across the Tamar, leaving Westren as one of the few key players to remain at Polson Bridge. This, along with the departure of head coach Neil Bayliss, meant that an inexperienced Launceston side had a mountain to climb at the start of the 2015-16 season, with many tipping them for relegation. These predictions came to be true as Launceston went win-less all season, with just one draw to show for 30 league games, and they were relegated by March 2016. Unsurprisingly, even Westren struggled to impress under these circumstances with just 2 tries in the league all season despite being ever present in the side.

Despite Launceston's relegation Westren remained loyal to the club as they started 2016-17 in National League 3 South West. A drop down in leagues did not make life easier for Launceston and despite wins against Salisbury and Bromsgrove they struggled around the relegation zone. As with the previous year Westren found it hard to score tries in a struggling side, having to wait until January for his first try in a 7-14 loss away to Salisbury (1 of only 2 tries all season). Performances did improve greatly after Christmas, as Launceston managed to string together a number of wins after including memorable wins against Camborne and Newton Abbot (who Westren scored his second and final try of the season against) they had left themselves too much to do and were relegated at the end of the season following a sequence of defeats.

The 2017-18 season was Westren's most productive in years, with him scoring 16 tries in the league campaign as he helped Launceston finish 3rd in Tribute South West 1 West, finishing as the club's second highest try scorer that year behind team-mate Dan Pearce. Having scored 11 tries before Christmas, Westren endured a barren spell in the second half before finishing with a flourish with 5 games in the last two games of the season, including a hat-trick against second placed Exeter University. The following season (2018–19) was Westren's first as player-coach. Although he wasn't quite as prolific as the previous year, he scored 7 tries from 19 league appearances as Launceston finished a close second behind champions Okehampton and qualified for a home play-off against South West 1 East runners up, Old Centralians. On 27 April 2019, Westren was instrumental in his club's play-off victory at Polson Bridge, scoring a hat-trick in an incredible come-from-behind victory as Launceston overturned a 0-19 half-time deficit to beat Old Cents by a final score of 33-22, and claim promotion to South West Premier. Westren would later state the playoff victory as being the biggest achievement in his career, despite having played professional rugby at a higher level.

== Coaching ==
At the end of the 2017-18 season Westren would replace the departing Jimmy Tucker as head coach alongside fellow coach Ian Goldsmith. Westren enjoyed a very successful debut season as head-coach as he and Goldsmith steered the side to the runners up spot in Tribute South West 1 West, and ultimately promotion to South West Premier after they defeated South West 1 East runners up, Old Centralians, in the promotion playoff at Polson Bridge.

== Season-by-season playing stats ==
=== Club ===
Season	Club	Competition	Appearances	Tries	Drop goals	Conversions	Penalties	Total points
2005-06	Cornish Pirates	National Division One	2	0	0	0	0	0
2006-07	Launceston	National Division Two	22	3	0	2	0	19
2006-07	Launceston	EDF Energy Trophy	2	0	0	2	0	4
2007-08	Launceston	National Division One	29	1	0	0	0	5
2007-08	Launceston	EDF Energy Trophy	3	2	0	0	0	10
2008-09	Launceston	National Division Two	21	7	0	0	0	35
2008-09	Launceston	EDF Energy Trophy	2	1	0	0	0	5
2009-10	Launceston	National League 1	30	12	0	0	0	60
2010-11	Launceston	National League 1	28	24	0	24	7	189
2011-12	Cornish Pirates	RFU Championship	1	0	0	0	0	0
2011-12	Cornish Pirates	British and Irish Cup	2	1	0	0	0	5
2011-12	Launceston	National League 2 South	3	3	0	0	0	15
2011-12	London Scottish	RFU Championship	15	4	0	0	0	20
2011-12	London Scottish	British and Irish Cup	0	0	0	0	0	0
2012-13	London Scottish	RFU Championship	2	0	0	0	0	0
2012-13	London Scottish	British and Irish Cup	0	0	0	0	0	0
2013-14	Launceston	National League 2 South	30	9	0	0	0	45
2014-15	Launceston	National League 2 South	24	4	0	0	0	20
2015-16	Launceston	National League 2 South	30	2	0	0	0	10
2016-17	Launceston	National League 3 South West	23	2	0	0	0	10
2017-18	Launceston	Tribute South West 1 West	24	16	0	0	0	80
2017-18	Launceston	Cornwall Cup	1	0	0	0	0	0
2018-19	Launceston	Tribute South West 1 West	19	7	0	0	0	35
2018-19	Launceston	Cornwall Cup	1	0	0	0	0	0
2018-19	Launceston	Promotion play-off	1	3	0	0	0	15
2019-20	Launceston	South West Premier	16	6	0	0	0	30

=== County/representative ===
Season	Side	Competition	Appearances	Tries	Drop goals	Conversions	Penalties	Total points
2006-07	Cornwall	County Championship Shield	3	2	0	0	0	10
2007-08	Cornwall	County Championship Shield	4	1	0	0	0	5
2008-09	Cornwall	County Championship	3	0	0	0	0	0
2009-10	Cornwall	County Championship	3	0	0	0	0	0
2013-14	Cornwall	Tamar Cup	1	0	0	0	0	0
2013-14	Cornwall	County Championship	4	0	0	0	0	0

== Honours and records ==
Launceston

- National League 1 joint top try scorer: 2010-11 (24 tries)
- Cornwall Super Cup winners: 2013–14
- South West 1 (east v west) promotion play-off winners: 2018–19

Cornwall

- County Championship Shield runner up: 2008
- Bill Beaumont Cup runner up: 2013
