= Kieron Lewitt =

English rugby union player

- Born: 21 January 1985 (age 41) Plymouth, Devon
- Height: 6 ft 1 in (1.85 m)
- Weight: 191 lb (87 kg)

Rugby union career
- Position(s): Full back, Wing
Senior career
Years	Team	Apps	(Points)
2003–05	Bath	2	(5)
2005–06, 2009–15	Launceston	154	(1193)
2007–09	Canterbury	23	(56)
2011	Cornish Pirates	1	(0)
- Correct as of 25 April 2015
International career
Years	Team	Apps	(Points)
2014	Cornwall	5	(56)

Kieron Lewitt (born 1985) is an English former rugby union footballer who played at full back or on the wing. Nicknamed Chewy, he is a former England youth international who has Premiership experience with Bath, but is best known for his two spells with Launceston, where he became club captain. An excellent points kicker, he was one of the most prolific scorers of all-time in National League 2 South with over 1,000 points, and his performances have seen him representing Cornwall in the county championships. Since being forced to retire due to injury in 2015, Keiron had spell at Launceston as backs coach.

== Career ==
=== Early career ===
Born in Plymouth, Devon, Keiron started playing youth rugby in Cornwall for his local side, Launceston. At 16 he left Cornwall to attend Colston's Collegiate in Bristol, where he was part of the school rugby team that were named by Rugby World Magazine as Team of the Year in 2003, counting the likes of Tom Varndell as his teammates. His performances in school rugby would see signed by Bath for their academy and he would also gain caps for England at under-16, under-18 and under-19 levels, culminating in him going to the 2005 Under 19 Rugby World Championship where England made the semi-finals.

Keiron made his Premiership debut with Bath in September 2004 away to Harlequins, where he scored a try with his first touch of the ball, as his side went on to win 18–10. Despite scoring on his debut against Quins, he would only make one more Premiership appearance with Bath before going on loan back at boyhood club Launceston in January 2005, then playing in National 2. He spent a year at Launceston, being part of the side that won the 2005 Cornwall Cup before leaving in 2007 to play rugby in the United States. After a brief spell in the States, Keiron returned to England and signed with Canterbury, playing in National Division 3 South and helping them to win the Kent Cup in 2008.

=== Second Spell with Launceston ===
For the 2009–10 season, Keiron returned to Cornwall to sign terms with Launceston in what was his third spell with the All-Blacks, having also played for them as a boy. Keiron had a good season, making 20 league appearances and scoring 11 tries, as his side finished 3rd in what was a very competitive National League 1. While his first season back with the club had been a positive season, the next season would be a nightmare for both Keiron and Launceston, as first his club were docked 20 points due to going into liquidation, and then Keiron broke his leg in a league game in September. Keiron returned from injury during the latter half of the season but could not help his club overturn the points deduction as they ended up being relegated from the division.

Despite the disappointment of relegation to National League 2 South, the 2011–12 season would see Keiron have the best scoring season of his career, ending up as the 2nd highest scorer in the league with 310 points, in a Launceston side that finished 7th in the league. He would also be called up for the Cornish Pirates British and Irish Cup squad, although he only made one appearance for the Championship side. The 2012–13 season would see Keiron continue his good form as he once again finished 2nd in the league scoring charts with 262 points in a mid-table Launceston side, and was awarded club Player of the Year and the Supporters' Player of the Year. Keiron's consistency with the boot continued into the 2013–14 season, as he finished 4th on the division scoring charts with 251 points, helping his club win the Cornwall Super Cup, and earning him a call-up to the Cornish county rugby side for the 2014 Bill Beaumont Cup – making his county debut in the traditional Tamar Cup against Devon – which Cornwall won 17 – 0 with Keiron kicking 3 penalties. At the county championships, Keiron played in all four of Cornwall's games, scoring 47 points, as they finished eventual runners up to Lancashire who they lost to 26 – 36 in the final at Twickenham.

The 2014–15 season would see Keiron appointed as captain of the club. Although he had a good personal tally of 257 league points and his side looked to be one of the most talented for several years, Launceston failed to club break into the top 6 in the league, finishing 10th, a point behind rivals Redruth. This season would also be Keiron's last as he suffered damage to his knee ligaments during the final home game of the season against Taunton Titans. Initially, it had been hoped that he might take part in the 2015–16 season but unfortunately his recovery was not successful. Keiron would continue at the club as a backs coach.

== Season-by-season playing stats ==
=== Club ===
Season	Club	Competition	Appearances	Tries	Drop Goals	Conversions	Penalties	Total Points
2004–05	Bath	Zurich Premiership	2	1	0	0	0	5
2004–05	Launceston	National Division 2	6	1	0	0	0	5
2005–06	Launceston	National Division 2	9	1	0	0	0	5
2006–07	Launceston	National Division 2	5	4	0	0	0	20
2006–07	Launceston	EDF Energy National Cup	1	0	0	0	0	0
2007–08	Canterbury	National Division 3 South	12	2	0	7	8	48
2008–09	Canterbury	National Division 3 South	9	0	2	0	0	6
2008–09	Canterbury	EDF National Trophy	2	0	0	1	0	2
2009–10	Launceston	National League 1	20	11	0	5	1	68
2010–11	Launceston	National League 1	3	3	0	0	0	15
2011–12	Cornish Pirates	British and Irish Cup	1	0	0	0	0	0
2011–12	Launceston	National League 2 South	29	4	0	55	60	310
2012–13	Launceston	National League 2 South	26	5	0	57	41	262
2013–14	Launceston	National League 2 South	27	9	0	37	44	251
2014–15	Launceston	National League 2 South	28	2	0	35	59	257

=== County/Representative ===
Season	Side	Competition	Appearances	Tries	Drop Goals	Conversions	Penalties	Total Points
2013–14	Cornwall	Tamar Cup	1	0	0	0	3	9
2013–14	Cornwall	County Championship	4	0	0	13	7	47

== Honours and records ==
Launceston

- Cornwall Cup winner: 2004–05
- Player of the Year: 2012–13
- Supporters’ Player of the Year: 2012–13
- Cornwall Super Cup winner: 2013–14

Canterbury

- Kent Cup winner: 2007–08

Cornwall

- Bill Beaumont Cup runner up: 2014

International

- Represented England at under-16, under-18 and under-19 levels
