= 2014 Bill Beaumont Cup =

2014 Bill Beaumont Cup (County Championship)
- Countries: England
- Date: 10 May 2014 - 1 June 2014
- Champions: Lancashire (23rd title)
- Runners-up: Cornwall
- Relegated: North Midlands, Northumberland
- Matches played: 13
- Attendance: 12,006 (average 924 per match)
- Highest attendance: 4,000 Lancashire v Cornwall (1 June 2014)
- Lowest attendance: 164 Hertfordshire v North Midlands (17 May 2014)
- Top point scorer: (England) Chris Johnson (Lancashire) 60
- Top try scorer: (England) Lewis Vinnicombe (Cornwall) 4

The 2014 Bill Beaumont Cup, also known as Bill Beaumont Cup Division One, was the 114th version of the annual, English rugby union, County Championship organized by the RFU for the top tier English counties. Each county drew its players from rugby union clubs from the third tier and below of the English rugby union league system (typically National League 1, National League 2 South or National League 2 North). The counties were divided into two regional pools with the winners of each pool meeting in the final held at Twickenham Stadium. New counties to the competition were the two finalists from the 2013 County Championship Plate final – Northumberland (winners) and North Midlands (runners-up) who replaced Durham and Kent. Lancashire were the defending champions.

The northern group was won by Lancashire, qualifying for their sixth successive final by winning all three games, although they had some stiff opposition from rivals Yorkshire and Cheshire on the way. They were joined by Cornwall, also making their second successive final, who won the southern section in a similar manner, with close wins against Hertfordshire and Gloucestershire getting them through. Both of the newly promoted counties, Northumberland and North Midlands, made an instant return as they were relegated to the 2015 County Championship Plate at the end of the competition.

In what was a repeat of the previous seasons final, Lancashire once again defeated Cornwall. Cornwall who were looking to win the championship for the first time in 14 years, actually led 23-10 at half-time, but fell apart in the second, as a rampant Lancashire side scored four tries to finish as victors 38-26. Lancashire's outstanding player of the tournament was Fylde's Chris Johnson, who scored 60 points over the competition, including 4 tries, while Lewis Vinnicombe, playing for Truro in Tribute Western Counties West, was excellent for Cornwall with 4 tries overall.

== Competition format ==
The competition format was two regional group stages divided into north and south, with each team playing each other once. This meant that two teams in the pool had two home games, while the other two had just one. The top side in each group went through to the final held at Twickenham Stadium on 1 June 2014.

== Participating Counties and ground locations ==
Locations of the 2014 Bill Beaumont Cup county teams

| County | Stadium(s) | Capacity | City/Area |
|---|---|---|---|
| Cheshire | Heywood Road; Paton Field | 5,400; 4,000 | Sale, Greater Manchester; Thurstaston, Merseyside |
| Cornwall | Recreation Ground; Recreation Ground | 3,500 (580 seats); 7,000 (780 seats) | Redruth, Cornwall; Camborne, Cornwall |
| Gloucestershire | Dockham Road | 2,500 | Cinderford, Gloucestershire |
| Hertfordshire | Woollam Playing Fields; Highfields | 1,000; N/A | St Albans, Hertfordshire; Ware, Hertfordshire |
| Lancashire | Woodlands Memorial Ground; Park Lane | 9,000; 3,000 | Lytham St Annes, Lancashire; Whitefield, Greater Manchester |
| North Midlands | Finstall Park | N/A | Bromsgrove, Worcestershire |
| Northumberland | Tynedale | 2,000 (400 seats) | Corbridge, Northumberland |
| Yorkshire | Silver Royd | 1,950 (322 seats) | Scalby, North Yorkshire |

== Group stage ==
=== Division 1 North ===
2014 Beaumont Cup Division 1 North Table
| | County | Played | Won | Drawn | Lost | Points For | Points Against | Points Difference | Try Bonus | Losing Bonus | Points |
| 1 | Lancashire (Q) | 3 | 3 | 0 | 0 | 111 | 61 | 50 | 2 | 0 | 14 |
| 2 | Yorkshire | 3 | 2 | 0 | 1 | 83 | 54 | 29 | 0 | 1 | 9 |
| 3 | Cheshire | 3 | 1 | 0 | 2 | 57 | 80 | -23 | 1 | 1 | 6 |
| 4 | Northumberland (R) | 3 | 0 | 0 | 3 | 72 | 128 | -56 | 1 | 1 | 2 |
If teams are level at any stage, tiebreakers are applied in the following order: 1. Number of matches won 2. Difference between points for and against 3. Total number of points for 4. Aggregate number of points scored in matches between tied teams 5. Number of matches won excluding the first match, then the second and so on until the tie is settled
Green background means the county qualified for the final. Pink background means the county were demoted to Division 2 North of the County Championship Plate for the following season. Updated: 24 May 2014; Source: "County Championships". englandrugby.com.

==== Round 1 ====
10 May 2014
15:00

| Cheshire | 3 - 24 | Yorkshire |

Heywood Road, Sale
Attendance: 330
Referee: Andrew Rawson

10 May 2014
15:00

| (BP) Lancashire | 57 - 19 | Northumberland |

Woodlands Memorial Ground, Lytham St Annes
Attendance: 425
Referee: Wayne Falla

==== Round 2 ====
17 May 2014

| (BP) Cheshire | 35 - 31 | Northumberland (2BP) |

Paton Field, Thurstaston
Attendance: 281
Referee: Brendan MacGaffney

17 May 2014

| (BP) Yorkshire | 23 - 29 | Lancashire (BP) |

Silver Royd, Scalby
Attendance: 1,850
Referee: Llyr Apgeraint-Roberts

==== Round 3 ====
24 May 2014

| Lancashire | 25 - 19 | Cheshire (BP) |

Park Lane, Whitefield
Attendance: 450
Referee: Karl Kirkpatrick

24 May 2014

| Northumberland | 22 - 36 | Yorkshire (BP) |

Tynedale Park, Corbridge
Attendance: 258
Referee: Andrew Rawson

=== Division 1 South ===
2014 Beaumont Cup Division 1 South Table
| | County | Played | Won | Drawn | Lost | Points For | Points Against | Points Difference | Try Bonus | Losing Bonus | Points |
| 1 | Cornwall (Q) | 3 | 3 | 0 | 0 | 111 | 58 | 53 | 2 | 0 | 14 |
| 2 | Hertfordshire | 3 | 2 | 0 | 1 | 93 | 52 | 41 | 2 | 1 | 11 |
| 3 | Gloucestershire | 3 | 1 | 0 | 2 | 91 | 82 | 9 | 1 | 1 | 6 |
| 4 | North Midlands (R) | 3 | 0 | 0 | 3 | 61 | 164 | -103 | 0 | 0 | 0 |
If teams are level at any stage, tiebreakers are applied in the following order: 1. Number of matches won 2. Difference between points for and against 3. Total number of points for 4. Aggregate number of points scored in matches between tied teams 5. Number of matches won excluding the first match, then the second and so on until the tie is settled
Green background means the county qualified for the final. Pink background means the county were en demoted to Division 2 South of the County Championship Plate for the following season. Updated: 24 May 2014; Source: "County Championships". englandrugby.com.

==== Round 1 ====
10 May 2014
15:00

| (BP) Cornwall | 65 - 22 | North Midlands |

The Recreation Ground, Redruth
Attendance: 1,200
Referee: Nick Williams

10 May 2014
15:00

| Gloucestershire | 19 - 30 | Hertfordshire (BP) |

Dockham Road, Cinderford
Attendance: 218
Referee: Graham Dickens

==== Round 2 ====
17 May 2014

| (BP) Cornwall | 33 - 27 | Gloucestershire (BP) |

Recreation Ground, Camborne
Attendance: 2,000
Referee: Paul Kimber

17 May 2014

| (BP) Hertfordshire | 54 - 20 | North Midlands |

Woollam Playing Fields, St Albans
Attendance: 164
Referee: Veryan Boscawen

==== Round 3 ====
24 May 2014

| (BP) Hertfordshire | 9 - 13 | Cornwall |

Highfields, Ware
Attendance: 580
Referee: James Clarke

24 May 2014

| North Midlands | 19 - 45 | Gloucestershire (BP) |

Finstall Park, Bromsgrove
Attendance: 250
Referee: Jamie Leahy

== Final ==
1 June 2014
12:15

| Lancashire | 36–26 | Cornwall |
| Try: Rylance, Stewart, Johnson, Lamprey, Burtonwood; Con: Johnson (4); Pen: Johnson | Report | Try: Vinnicombe, Ford-Robinson; Con: Lewitt (2); Pen: Lewitt (4) |

Twickenham Stadium, London
Attendance: 4,000
Referee: Andrew Rawson

| 15 | Sean Taylor | Preston Grasshoppers |
| 14 | Warren Spragg | Fylde |
| 13 | Chris Briers | Fylde |
| 12 | Matt Riley | Sedgley Park |
| 11 | Oliver Brennand | Fylde |
| 10 | Chris Johnson (capt) | Fylde |
| 9 | Ryan De la Harpe | Fylde |
| 1 | Adam Lewis | Fylde |
| 2 | Mark Rylance | Fylde |
| 3 | Ben Black | Sedgley Park |
| 4 | Louis McGowan | Sedgley Park |
| 5 | Gareth Gore | Fylde |
| 6 | Gareth Rawlings | Longton |
| 7 | Evan Stewart | Fylde |
| 8 | Matthew Lamprey | Sedgley Park |
Replacements:
| 16 | Simon Griffiths | Fylde |
| 17 | Peter Altham | Preston Grasshoppers |
| 18 | David Fairbrother | Fleetwood |
| 19 | Paul Arnold | Fylde |
| 20 | Tom Burtonwood | Fylde |
| 21 | Phil Baines | Preston Grasshoppers |
| 22 | Steve Collins | Sedgley Park |

| 15 | Kieron Lewitt | Cornish All Blacks |
| 14 | Lewis Vinnicombe | Truro |
| 13 | Ryan Westren | Cornish All Blacks |
| 12 | Nielson Webber | Cornish All Blacks |
| 11 | Tom Notman | Redruth |
| 10 | Lewis Webb | Cornish All Blacks |
| 9 | Greg Goodfellow | Redruth |
| 1 | Darren Jacques | Truro |
| 2 | Jamie Salter | Cornish All Blacks |
| 3 | Craig Williams | Redruth |
| 4 | Damien Cook | Redruth |
| 5 | Ben Hilton (capt) | Cornish All Blacks |
| 6 | Chris Fuca | Redruth |
| 7 | Tom Rawlings | Cornish All Blacks |
| 8 | Barrie-John Chapman | Cornish All Blacks |
Replacements:
| 16 | Jamal Ford-Robinson | Cambridge |
| 17 | Bryn Jenkins | Cornish All Blacks |
| 18 | Sam Parsons | Redruth |
| 19 | Tony Whittle | Falmouth |
| 20 | Steven Johns | Birmingham Solihull |
| 21 | Matthew Shepherd | St Austell |
| 22 | Richard Brown | Redruth |

== Total season attendances ==
- Does not include final at Twickenham which is a neutral venue and involves teams from all three county divisions on the same day

| County | Home Games | Total | Average | Highest | Lowest | % Capacity |
|---|---|---|---|---|---|---|
| Cheshire | 2 | 611 | 306 | 330 | 281 | 7% |
| Cornwall | 2 | 3,200 | 1,600 | 2,000 | 1,200 | 31% |
| Gloucestershire | 1 | 218 | 218 | 218 | 218 | 9% |
| Hertfordshire | 2 | 744 | 372 | 580 | 164 | 16% |
| Lancashire | 2 | 875 | 438 | 450 | 425 | 10% |
| North Midlands | 1 | 250 | 250 | 250 | 250 | |
| Northumberland | 1 | 258 | 258 | 258 | 258 | 13% |
| Yorkshire | 1 | 1,850 | 1,850 | 1,850 | 1,850 | 95% |

== Individual statistics ==
- Note if players are tied on tries or points the player with the lowest number of appearances will come first. Also note that points scorers includes tries as well as conversions, penalties and drop goals. Appearance figures also include coming on as substitutes (unused substitutes not included). Statistics will also include final.

=== Top points scorers ===
| Rank | Player | County | Club Side | Appearances | Points |
|---|---|---|---|---|---|
| 1 | (England) Chris Johnson | Lancashire | Fylde | 4 | 60 |
| 2 | (England) Kieron Lewitt | Cornwall | Launceston | 4 | 47 |
| 3 | (England) Leo Fielding | Gloucestershire | Chinnor | 3 | 46 |
| 4 | (England) Richard Vasey | Cheshire | Caldy | 3 | 29 |
| 5 | (England) Lawrence Rayner | Hertfordshire | Old Albanian | 3 | 23 |

=== Top try scorers ===
| Rank | Player | County | Club Side | Appearances | Tries |
|---|---|---|---|---|---|
| 1 | (England) Lewis Vinnicombe | Cornwall | Truro | 3 | 4 |
| 2 | (England) Chris Johnson | Lancashire | Fylde | 4 | 4 |
| 3 | (England) Tom Notman | Cornwall | Redruth | 4 | 4 |
| 4 | (England) Leo Fielding | Gloucestershire | Chinnor | 3 | 3 |
| 5 | (Italy) Warren Spragg | Lancashire | Fylde | 4 | 3 |

== See also ==
- English rugby union system
- Rugby union in England
