= Lee Jarvis =

Wales international rugby union player

- Born: Lee Jarvis; 30 September 1976 (age 50) Pontypridd, Wales
- Height: 1.78 m (5 ft 10 in)
- Weight: 130 kg (20 st)

Rugby union career
Youth career
- Pontypridd
Senior career
Years	Team	Apps	(Points)
1995–1996	Pontypridd		
1996–1999	Cardiff	84	(1,168)
1999–2001	Pontypridd		(584)
2001–2003	Neath		(696)
2003–2004	Newport Gwent Dragons	16	(212)
2004–2006	Cornish Pirates	48	(359)
2006–2008	Mounts Bay		(334)
2008–2010	Cardiff	29	(171)
2009–2010	Cardiff Blues		
- Correct as of 13:01, 10 December 2015 (UTC)
International career
Years	Team	Apps	(Points)
1997	Wales	1	(2)
- Correct as of 10 December 2015

Lee Jarvis (born 30 September 1976 in Pontypridd, Wales) is a former international Welsh rugby union player who was known as a top points scorer with the boot. His career has been spent in both Wales and England including top level rugby in Wales and in the Celtic League, winning a number of trophies in both countries. He has represented Wales from school level to full international honours as well as being selected by the Barbarians. Despite being tipped as the "next best thing" during his early career and being a great points kicker Jarvis only earned one cap for Wales at full international level. After retiring from rugby union as a player, Jarvis took up coaching. He is currently a well known regular tweeter with his use of emojis and “fekking” Twitter banter.

== Playing career ==
=== Early career ===
An outside-half, he began his club career at his local club Pontypridd in 1995 where he was a member of the youth academy. Despite making an appearance in the Heineken Cup, Jarvis found opportunities limited at Pontypridd as Welsh legend Neil Jenkins was already firmly entrenched as the main man in his position at the club so he moved to local rivals Cardiff for the start of the 1996–97 season. Jarvis spent three seasons at Cardiff where he scored an incredible 1,000 points in his time there which also saw the club win the SWALEC Cup in his first season and included a career best performance in his second season of almost 500 points in all competitions. He also gained a cap (the only one of his career) for Wales - playing just two minutes against Romania in 1997 but typically still managing to score a conversion in the limited time he played. Despite a great scoring record at Cardiff, in 1999 Jarvis returning to his former club, Pontypridd, as part of a record £200,000 deal that the capital club paid for his former teammate Neil Jenkins.

=== Celtic League ===
After two seasons at Pontypridd where he was once more one of the league's top scorers, Jarvis moved to Neath to coincide with the inaugural Celtic league - a competition which involved Welsh, Scottish and Irish clubs - helping the club to the quarter-finals where they lost to Irish province Ulster. Along with appearances in the domestic Welsh league/cup, Jarvis amassed over 400 points including 100 in the Celtic League. In 2003 a further change to Welsh rugby led to the creation of five regional sides who replaced the original Welsh clubs in the Celtic League. Jarvis moved back east to join the Newport Gwent Dragons regional side. He only spent a season with the Dragons where he found opportunities limited by highly capped South African international Percy Montgomery and Craig Warlow (although as always he still had a decent points record from games played).

=== Move to Cornwall ===
After nine years in Wales Jarvis decided to make the decision to move across the Bristol Channel to Cornwall where he joined the Cornish Pirates, an ambitious club plying their trade in the English second division, for the 2004–05 season. He made the decision partly due to pressure playing in Welsh rugby where for years he had been touted as the "next best thing" but had been unable to gain the international caps he had been expected to when he started his career. At Pirates he became a first team regular helping the club to gain very respectable 4th and 3rd-place positions in the league in the two seasons he was there.

Two years at Pirates were followed by another two seasons at nearby Mounts Bay. In two years at the Penzance-based club, Jarvis helped the club achieve two consecutive promotions from tier 5 up to tier 3 in what was a very exciting period for the short-lived club. As well as claiming two league titles, Mounts Bay also won the EDF Intermediate Cup and Cornish Super Cup in this period and on a personal note Jarvis was also top points scorer in National Division 3 South during his second year at the club. Despite enjoying life in Cornwall Jarvis received an offer from former club Cardiff to become player coach and he returned to Wales for the start of the 2008–09 season.

=== Return to Cardiff ===
In his role as player-coach Jarvis still showed that he had a lot to offer the club, coming off the bench to help Cardiff defeat Glamorgan Wanderers, scoring three penalties and a drop goal in the final 30 minutes of a Principality Premiership game in November. He managed to score 294 points during the season in which Cardiff claimed the Principality Premiership title - their first since 2000. Jarvis was also selected for Cardiff Blues while at Cardiff and played an increasing role as a backs coach at the Blues Academy. In September 2010, Jarvis launched Lee Jarvis Kicking Clinics, an attempt to pass on his skills as a tactical and place kicker to a new generation of rugby players.

== Coaching career ==
=== Merthyr ===
After several years at Cardiff Blues, in 2013 Jarvis joined struggling Merthyr (then in Division 1 East) alongside Gary Horrigan as head coach. The Ironmen managed to survive relegation, beating Ystrad Rhondda on the last day of the season to stay up. Under the backing of multi millionaire Sir Stan Thomas, Merthyr then won the Division 1 East title to gain promotion to the Welsh Championship as well as claiming the SWALEC Plate.

== Professional playing career ==
Season	Club	League	Points (all competitions)
1995-96	(Wales) Pontypridd	Welsh Premier Division	?
1996-97	(Wales) Cardiff	Welsh Premier Division	403
1997-98	(Wales) Cardiff	Welsh Premier Division	496
1998-99	(Wales) Cardiff	Welsh Premier Division	268
1999-00	(Wales) Pontypridd	Welsh Premier Division	302
2000-01	(Wales) Pontypridd	Welsh-Scottish League	282
2001–02	(Wales) Neath	Celtic League / Welsh-Scottish League	436
2002–03	(Wales) Neath	Celtic League / Principality Premiership	260
2003–04	(Wales) Newport Gwent Dragons	Celtic League	212
2004–05	(England) Cornish Pirates	National Division One	247 (Note: This figure may be 290 if you count other competitions not included by Rugby Statbunker.)
2005–06	(England) Cornish Pirates	National Division One	112 (Note: This figure may be 246 if you count other competitions not included by Rugby Statbunker.)
2006-07	(England) Mounts Bay	South West Division 1	377
2007–08	(England) Mounts Bay	National Division 3 South	334 (Note: This figure may be 348 if you count other competitions not included by Rugby Statbunker such as the Cornwall Super Cup.)
2008–09	(Wales) Cardiff	Principality Premiership	294
2009–10	(Wales) Cardiff / Cardiff Blues	Principality Premiership / Pro12	?

== Playing honours ==
Pontypridd 64 appearances, 712 points

Cardiff 117 appearances, 1339 points

- Swalec Cup winners: 1996-97
- Principality Premiership champions: 2008–09

Neath No Data

Dragons 16 appearances, 72 points

Cornish Pirates 48 appearances, 359 points

Mounts Bay

- EDF Energy Intermediate Cup winners: 2006-07
- South West Division 1 champions: 2006-07
- Cornwall Super Cup winners: 2007-08
- National Division 3 South champions: 2007–08
- National Division 3 South top points scorer (266 points): 2007–08

Cardiff Blues no data

International/Representative

- Selected for Barbarians tour of Japan: 1996
- Capped for Wales: 1997

== Coaching honours ==
Merthyr

- Division 1 East champions: 2013-14
- SWALEC Plate winners: 2013-14
