= Mounts Bay RFC =

English rugby union club, based in Penzance, Cornwall

Mounts Bay
- Full name: Mounts Bay RFC
- Union: Rugby Football Union
- Nickname: Bay
- Founded: 1999; 27 years ago
- Disbanded: 2009; 17 years ago
- Location: Penzance, Cornwall, England
- Ground: Mennaye Field (Capacity: 4,000)
- League: National Division 2
- 2008–09: 13th

Mounts Bay RFC was a Cornish rugby club formed in December 1999 and based in Penzance, England, which folded in July 2009. Initially formed as an offshoot from Penzance & Newlyn RFC, the club operated as an independent club. Mounts Bay were promoted at the end of the 2007–08 season and competed in National Division Two in the 2008–09 season. However, the club folded in the summer of 2009 due to financial problems and withdrew from the league structure.

== 2006–07 season ==
Mounts Bay had a successful year as they were promoted to the National Leagues as champions of Southwest 1 with three games to play. They also reached two cup finals; on 11 April 2007 they lost 43–7 to Redruth in the final the CRFU Cornwall Cup and on 15 April 2007, Bay made their only visit to Twickenham for the EDF Energy Intermediate Cup Final against former winners Dunstablians. They won the match 46–36.

== 2007–08 season ==
In their first season in the National Leagues, Mounts Bay finished first in National Division Three South and were again promoted, their eighth promotion in nine seasons, to play in National Division Two during the 2008–09 season. Fly-half Lee Jarvis was the league's top point scorer with 266 points. In addition to the league championship Mounts Bay also won the Cornwall Super Cup by defeating Launceston 45–17 on 24 March 2008.

== 2008–09 season ==
Mounts Bay's quick rise ended with their only relegation. It was soon followed by an AGM in July 2009 that confirmed they were to fold after the possibility of a groundshare with Redruth RFC broke down and they were left with large debts and little assets.

== Season summary ==
Season	League			National Cup(s)		County Cup(s)	
Season	Competition (Level)	Position	Points	Competition	Performance	Competition	Performance
2000–01	Cornwall 2 (10)	1st (promoted)	26			Cornwall Clubs Cup	Runner-up
2001–02	Cornwall 1 (9)	2nd (lost play-off)	26				
2002–03	Cornwall 1 (9)	2nd (promoted via play-off)	26			Cornwall Clubs Cup	Runner-up
2003–04	Cornwall/Devon (8)	1st (promoted)	40	Powergen Junior Vase	Semi-finals		
2004–05	Western Counties West (7)	1st (promoted)	40			Cornwall Cup	Quarter-finals
2005–06	South West 2 West (6)	1st (promoted)	42				
2006–07	South West 1 (5)	1st (promoted)	35	RFU Intermediate Cup	Winners	Cornwall Cup	Runner-up
2007–08	National 3 South (4)	1st (promoted)	107 (Note: Bonus points had been used at level 4 since the 2004–05 season but would not be introduced to the lower leagues until much later. As this was the highest level that Mounts Bay had reached in their history, 2007–08 was the first season the club would encounter bonus points.)	EDF Energy Trophy	4th round	Cornwall Super Cup	Winners
2008–09	National 2 (3)	13th (relegated)	29	EDF Energy Trophy	Quarter-finals		
Green background stands for either league champions (with promotion) or cup winners. Blue background stands for promotion without winning league or losing cup finalists. Pink background stands for relegation.

== Honours ==
- Cornwall League 2 champions: 2000–01
- Cornwall 1 v Devon 1 promotion play-off winners: 2002–03
- Tribute Cornwall/Devon champions: 2003–04
- Powergen Junior Vase semi-finalists: 2003–04
- Western Counties West champions: 2004–05
- South West Division 2 West champions: 2005–06
- South West Division 1 champions: 2006–07
- EDF Energy Intermediate Cup winners: 2006–07
- National League Division 3 South champions: 2007–08
- Cornwall Super Cup winners: 2007–08

== Notable former players ==
- Lee Jarvis – Wales international.
- Josh Matavesi – Fiji international.

== See also ==
- Rugby union in Cornwall
