= 2012–13 National League 2 South =

Rugby union competition in England

- Countries: England
- Champions: Henley Hawks
- Runners-up: Worthing Raiders (also promoted)
- Relegated: Barking, Lydney
- Matches played: 210
- Attendance: 76,158 (average 363 per match)
- Highest attendance: 3,270; Henley Hawks v Worthing Raiders; 4 May 2013
- Lowest attendance: 67; Barking v Taunton Titans; 30 March 2013
- Top point scorer: (England) Mark Woodrow (Dings Crusaders); 289 points
- Top try scorer: (England) Ian Clark (Hartpury College) (England) Alexander Nielsen (Worthing Raiders); 20 tries

The 2012–13 National League 2 South was the fourth season (26th overall) of the fourth tier (south) of the English domestic rugby union competitions since the professionalised format of the second division was introduced. The league system was 4 points for a win, 2 points for a draw and additional bonus points being awarded for scoring 4 or more tries and/or losing within 7 points of the victorious team. In terms of promotion the league champions would go straight up into National League 1 while the runners up would have a one-game playoff against the runners up from National League 2 North (at the home ground of the club with the superior league record) for the final promotion place.

Henley Hawks, as champions, were promoted to the third tier (2013–14 National League 1) for next season, along with Worthing Raiders who finished second. Worthing beat the 2012–13 National League 2 North runners up Stourbridge 28–26 to win the annual promotion playoff. Barking and Lydney were both relegated to National League 3 London & SE and National League 3 South West respectively with Barking winning just one game in what was a very poor season. As well as winning the league Henley Hawks also saw a divisional record attendance at Dry Leas with 3,270 fans turning up to the last game of the season - the championship decider against Worthing Raiders which Henley won 55 - 27 to seal the title for the Oxfordshire club.

== Participating teams ==
Twelve of the teams listed below participated in the 2011–12 National League 2 South season. Barking were relegated from National League 1 after just one season and both Bournemouth and Chinnor were promoted from National League 3 South West. Rugby Lions were on the original fixture list after winning promotion from National League 3 Midlands but during July 2012 they went into liquidation and were unable to participate in the division, leaving fifteen teams instead of the usual sixteen.

Locations of the 2012–13 National League 2 South teams

| Team | Ground | Capacity | City/Area |
|---|---|---|---|
| Barking | Goresbrook | 1,000 | Barking, London |
| Bournemouth | Chapel Gate | 1,500 | Bournemouth, Dorset |
| Canterbury | Merton Lane | 1,500 (75 seats) | Canterbury, Kent |
| Chinnor | Kingsey Road | 2,000 | Thame, Oxfordshire |
| Clifton | Station Road | 2,200 (200 seats) | Cribbs Causeway, Patchway, Bristol |
| Dings Crusaders | Landseer Avenue | 1,500 | Lockleaze, Bristol |
| Hartpury College | College Stadium | 2,000 | Hartpury, Gloucestershire |
| Henley Hawks | Dry Leas | 4,000 | Henley-on-Thames, Oxfordshire |
| Launceston | Polson Bridge | 3,000 | Launceston, Cornwall |
| Lydney | Regentsholme | 3,000 (340 seats) | Lydney, Gloucestershire |
| Redruth | The Recreation Ground | 3,500 (580 seats) | Redruth, Cornwall |
| Shelford | The Davey Field | 2,000 (150 seats) | Great Shelford, Cambridgeshire |
| Southend Saxons | Warners Park | 1,500 (150 seats) | Southend, Essex |
| Taunton Titans | Hyde Park, Bathpool | 2,000 (198 seats) | Taunton, Somerset |
| Worthing Raiders | Roundstone Lane | 1,500 (100 seats) | Angmering, West Sussex |

== League table ==
2012–13 National League 2 South table
| Pos | Team | Pld | W | D | L | PF | PA | PD | TB | LB | Pts | Qualification |
|---|---|---|---|---|---|---|---|---|---|---|---|---|
| 1 | Henley Hawks (C, P) | 28 | 24 | 0 | 4 | 1261 | 446 | +815 | 21 | 3 | 120 | Promoted |
| 2 | Worthing Raiders (P) | 28 | 24 | 0 | 4 | 1075 | 511 | +564 | 19 | 2 | 117 | Promotion play-off |
| 3 | Hartpury College | 28 | 21 | 1 | 6 | 1032 | 458 | +574 | 18 | 5 | 109 | |
| 4 | Redruth | 28 | 19 | 0 | 9 | 822 | 609 | +213 | 14 | 4 | 94 | |
| 5 | Shelford | 28 | 19 | 0 | 9 | 717 | 644 | +73 | 15 | 2 | 93 | |
| 6 | Chinnor | 28 | 14 | 0 | 14 | 720 | 798 | −78 | 16 | 4 | 76 | |
| 7 | Launceston | 28 | 14 | 1 | 13 | 711 | 568 | +143 | 11 | 5 | 74 | |
| 8 | Canterbury | 28 | 12 | 0 | 16 | 715 | 736 | −21 | 13 | 2 | 63 | |
| 9 | Dings Crusaders | 28 | 13 | 0 | 15 | 635 | 738 | −103 | 7 | 5 | 59 (Note: Dings Crusaders were deducted 5 competition points) | |
| 10 | Taunton Titans | 28 | 10 | 0 | 18 | 725 | 823 | −98 | 12 | 6 | 58 | |
| 11 | Southend Saxons | 28 | 10 | 0 | 18 | 644 | 894 | −250 | 10 | 5 | 55 | |
| 12 | Clifton | 28 | 9 | 0 | 19 | 653 | 940 | −287 | 11 | 6 | 53 | |
| 13 | Bournemouth | 28 | 10 | 0 | 18 | 635 | 803 | −168 | 9 | 3 | 52 | |
| 14 | Lydney (R) | 28 | 9 | 0 | 19 | 484 | 756 | −272 | 2 | 7 | 45 | Relegated |
| 15 | Barking (R) | 28 | 1 | 0 | 27 | 337 | 1442 | −1105 | 2 | 1 | 7 | Relegated |

Updated to match(es) played on 11 May 2013. Source: clubs.rfu.com, trelawnys-army.org.uk, bbc.co.uk, ncarugby.org
Rules for classification: If teams are level at any stage, tiebreakers are applied in the following order:
1. Number of matches won
2. Difference between points for and against
3. Total number of points for
4. Aggregate number of points scored in matches between tied teams
5. Number of matches won excluding the first match, then the second and so on until the tie is settled
  (C) Champion; (P) Promoted; (R) Relegated
  Notes:

== Results ==
=== Round 1 ===
1 September 2012
14:00

| (BP) Clifton | 10 - 16 | Hartpury College |
| | Report |

Station Road
Attendance: 100
Referee: Fergus Kirby

1 September 2012
14:30

| Bournemouth | 32 - 17 | Canterbury |
| | Report |

Chapel Gate
Attendance: 400
Referee: Paul Kimber

1 September 2012
15:00

| (BP) Henley Hawks | 39 - 19 | Shelford |
| | Report |

Dry Leas
Attendance: 290
Referee: Phil Watters

1 September 2012
15:00

| (2BP) Launceston | 29 - 33 | Chinnor (BP) |
| | Report |

Polson Bridge
Attendance: 535
Referee: John Healy

1 September 2012
15:00

| (BP) Lydney | 34 - 10 | Barking |
| | Report |

Regentsholme
Attendance: 345
Referee: James Sullivan

1 September 2012
15:00

| Southend Saxons | 26 - 19 | Dings Crusaders (BP) |
| | Report |

Warners Bridge Park
Attendance: 100
Referee: Rob Warburton

1 September 2012
15:00

| Taunton Titans | 15 - 25 | Redruth |
| | Report |

Hyde Park
Attendance: 410
Referee: Keith Lewis

Bye: Worthing Raiders

=== Round 2 ===
8 September 2012
14:00

| (BP) Hartpury College | 48 - 13 | Taunton Titans |
| | Report |

College Stadium
Attendance: 150
Referee: Phil Watters

8 September 2012
15:00

| (BP) Canterbury | 74 - 15 | Barking |
| | Report |

Merton Lane
Attendance: 150
Referee: Craig Maxwell Keys

8 September 2012
15:00

| Dings Crusaders | 24 - 14 | Clifton |
| | Report |

Landseer Avenue
Attendance: 225
Referee: Tom Foley

8 September 2012
15:00

| (BP) Henley Hawks | 41 - 15 | Lydney |
| | Report |

Dry Leas
Attendance: 206
Referee: James Sullivan

8 September 2012
15:00

| (BP) Redruth | 46 - 24 | Launceston (BP) |
| | Report |

The Recreation Ground
Attendance: 1,140
Referee: Nick Williams

8 September 2012
15:00

| (BP) Shelford | 59 - 25 | Southend Saxons |
| | Report |

The Davey Field
Attendance: 132
Referee: Alex Manley

8 September 2012
15:00

| (BP) Worthing Raiders | 45 - 14 | Bournemouth |
| | Report |

Roundstone Lane
Attendance: 487
Referee: Mike Cooper

Bye: Chinnor

=== Round 3 ===
15 September 2012
14:30

| (BP) Bournemouth | 41 - 29 | Chinnor (BP) |
| | Report |

Chapel Gate
Attendance: 300
Referee: Fergus Kirby

15 September 2012
14:30

| Clifton | 24 - 32 | Shelford (BP) |
| | Report |

Station Road
Attendance: 106
Referee: Nick Williams

15 September 2012
15:00

| Barking | 3 - 58 | Worthing Raiders (BP) |
| | Report |

Goresbrook
Attendance: 98
Referee: Alex Manley

15 September 2012
15:00

| Launceston | 24 - 24 | Hartpury College |
| | Report |

Polson Bridge
Attendance: 410
Referee: Richard Kelly

15 September 2012
15:00

| Lydney | 7 - 35 | Canterbury (BP) |
| | Report |

Regentsholme
Attendance: 407
Referee: Luke Haskins

15 September 2012
15:00

| Southend Saxons | 7 - 64 | Henley Hawks |
| | Report |

Warners Bridge Park
Attendance: 150
Referee: Mike Cooper

15 September 2012
15:00

| Taunton Titans | 18 - 16 | Dings Crusaders (BP) |
| | Report |

Hyde Park
Attendance: 450
Referee: John Healy

Bye: Redruth

=== Round 4 ===
22 September 2012
14:00

| (BP) Chinnor | 34 - 18 | Barking |
| | Report |

Kingsey Road
Attendance: 308
Referee: Graham Dickens

22 September 2012
14:30

| Dings Crusaders | 19 - 30 | Launceston (BP) |
| | Report |

Landseer Avenue
Attendance: 110
Referee: Andy Rawson

22 September 2012
15:00

| (BP) Henley Hawks | 71 - 7 | Clifton |
| | Report |

Dry Leas
Attendance: 375
Referee: Keith Lewis

22 September 2012
15:00

| Redruth | 18 - 13 | Bournemouth (BP) |
| | Report |

The Recreation Ground
Attendance: 788
Referee: Luke Haskins

22 September 2012
15:00

| (BP) Shelford | 32 - 23 | Taunton Titans (BP) |
| | Report |

The Davey Field
Attendance: 182
Referee: Craig Maxwell Keys

22 September 2012
15:00

| Southend Saxons | 20 - 13 | Lydney (BP) |
| | Report |

Warners Bridge Park
Attendance: 87
Referee: Fergus Kirby

22 September 2012
15:00

| (BP) Worthing Raiders | 55 - 31 | Canterbury (BP) |
| | Report |

Roundstone Lane
Attendance: 392
Referee: Paul Kimber

Bye: Hartpury College

=== Round 5 ===
29 September 2012
14:30

| Bournemouth | 7 - 43 | Hartpury College (BP) |
| | Report |

Chapel Gate
Attendance: 300
Referee: Keith Lewis

29 September 2012
14:30

| (BP) Clifton | 36 - 24 | Southend Saxons (BP) |
| | Report |

Station Road
Attendance: 80
Referee: Guy Steel Bodger

29 September 2012
15:00

| Barking | 23 - 51 | Redruth (BP) |
| | Report |

Goresbrook
Attendance: Mike Cooper
Referee: 87

29 September 2012
15:00

| Canterbury | 21 - 20 | Chinnor (2BP) |
| | Report |

Merton Lane
Attendance: 232
Referee: James Sullivan

29 September 2012
15:00

| Launceston | 13 - 29 | Shelford (BP) |
| | Report |

Polson Bridge
Attendance: 402
Referee: Phil Watters

29 September 2012
15:00

| (BP) Lydney | 16 - 20 | Worthing Raiders |
| | Report |

Regentsholme
Attendance: 311
Referee: Craig Maxwell Keys

29 September 2012
15:00

| Taunton Titans | 11 - 61 | Henley Hawks (BP) |
| | Report |

Hyde Park
Attendance: 420
Referee: Nick Williams

Bye: Dings Crusaders

=== Round 6 ===
6 October 2012
14:00

| (BP) Hartpury College | 62 - 6 | Barking |
| | Report |

College Stadium
Attendance: 200
Referee: D Edmunds

6 October 2012
14:30

| (BP) Chinnor | 36 - 21 | Worthing Raiders |
| | Report |

Kingsey Road
Attendance: 428
Referee: Paul Kimber

6 October 2012
14:30

| Clifton | 30 - 11 | Lydney |
| | Report |

Station Road
Attendance: 247
Referee: John Healy

6 October 2012
14:30

| Dings Crusaders | 21 - 6 | Bournemouth |
| | Report |

Landseer Avenue
Attendance: 178
Referee: Richard Harding

6 October 2012
15:00

| (BP) Henley Hawks | 26 - 13 | Launceston |
| | Report |

Dry Leas
Attendance: 428
Referee: Mike Cooper

6 October 2012
15:00

| (BP) Redruth | 36 - 19 | Canterbury |
| | Report |

The Recreation Ground
Attendance: 809
Referee: Nick Williams

6 October 2012
15:00

| Southend Saxons | 22 - 33 | Taunton Titans (BP) |
| | Report |

Warners Bridge Park
Attendance: 120
Referee: Keith Lewis

Bye: Shelford

=== Round 7 ===
13 October 2012
14:30

| Bournemouth | 10 - 24 | Shelford (BP) |
| | Report |

Chapel Gate
Attendance: 400
Referee: Mike Cooper

13 October 2012
15:00

| Barking | 19 - 33 | Dings Crusaders (BP) |
| | Report |

Goresbrook
Attendance: 87

13 October 2012
15:00

| Canterbury | 7 - 41 | Hartpury College (BP) |
| | Report |

Merton Lane
Attendance: 263

13 October 2012
15:00

| (BP) Launceston | 38 - 6 | Southend Saxons |
| | Report |

Polson Bridge
Attendance: 406
Referee: Phil Watters

13 October 2012
15:00

| (BP) Lydney | 22 - 23 | Chinnor |
| | Report |

Regentsholme
Attendance: 407
Referee: Rob Warburton

13 October 2012
15:00

| (BP) Taunton Titans | 17 - 18 | Clifton |
| | Report |

Hyde Park
Attendance: 917
Referee: Luke Haskins

13 October 2012
15:00

| Worthing Raiders | 27 - 26 | Redruth (BP) |
| | Report |

Roundstone Lane
Attendance: 412
Referee: Fergus Kirby

Bye: Henley Hawks

=== Round 8 ===
20 October 2012
14:00

| (BP) Hartpury College | 14 - 15 | Worthing Raiders |
| | Report |

College Stadium
Attendance: 250
Referee: Phil Watters

20 October 2012
14:30

| (BP) Clifton | 38 - 25 | Launceston |
| | Report |

Station Road
Attendance: 167
Referee: Mark Liddell

20 October 2012
14:30

| Dings Crusaders | 40 - 20 | Canterbury |
| | Report |

Landseer Avenue
Attendance: 152
Referee: Graham Dickens

20 October 2012
15:00

| (BP) Henley Hawks | 63 - 7 | Bournemouth |
| | Report |

Dry Leas
Attendance: 460
Referee: James Sullivan

20 October 2012
15:00

| (BP) Redruth | 44 - 14 | Chinnor |
| | Report |

The Recreation Ground
Attendance: 837
Referee: Paul Kimber

20 October 2012
15:00

| (BP) Shelford | 38 - 7 | Barking |
| | Report |

The Davey Field
Attendance: 347

20 October 2012
15:00

| Taunton Titans | 25 - 23 | Lydney (BP) |
| | Report |

Hyde Park
Attendance: 318
Referee: Nick Williams

Bye: Southend Saxons

=== Round 9 ===
27 October 2012
14:00

| Chinnor | 8 - 22 | Hartpury College (BP) |
| | Report |

Kingsey Road
Attendance: 378
Referee: Mike Cooper

27 October 2012
14:30

| (BP) Bournemouth | 31 - 15 | Southend Saxons |
| | Report |

Chapel Gate
Attendance: 400
Referee: Paul Kimber

27 October 2012
15:00

| Barking | 3 - 85 | Henley Hawks (BP) |
| | Report |

Goresbrook
Attendance: 83
Referee: Rob Warburton

27 October 2012
15:00

| Canterbury | 12 - 30 | Shelford (BP) |
| | Report |

Merton Lane
Attendance: 183
Referee: Fergus Kirby

27 October 2012
15:00

| (BP) Launceston | 39 - 24 | Taunton Titans |
| | Report |

Polson Bridge
Attendance: 527
Referee: James Sullivan

27 October 2012
15:00

| Lydney | 23 - 31 | Redruth (BP) |
| | Report |

Regentsholme
Attendance: 295
Referee: Simon Walker

27 October 2012
15:00

| (BP) Worthing Raiders | 29 - 25 | Dings Crusaders (BP) |
| | Report |

Roundstone Lane
Attendance: 376
Referee: Keith Lewis

Bye: Clifton

=== Round 10 ===
3 November 2012
14:00

| (BP) Hartpury College | 47 - 15 | Redruth |
| | Report |

College Stadium
Attendance: 350
Referee: Rob Warburton

3 November 2012
14:30

| (BP) Clifton | 6 - 13 | Bournemouth |
| | Report |

Station Road
Attendance: 250
Referee: Simon Walker

3 November 2012
14:30

| (BP) Dings Crusaders | 39 - 35 | Chinnor (2BP) |
| | Report |

Landseer Avenue
Attendance: 131
Referee: Phil Watters

3 November 2012
14:30

| Launceston | 17 - 12 | Lydney (BP) |
| | Report |

Polson Bridge
Attendance: 388
Referee: Nick Williams

3 November 2012
14:30

| Shelford | 22 - 31 | Worthing Raiders |
| | Report |

The Davey Field
Attendance: 402
Referee: David Procter

3 November 2012
15:00

| (BP) Henley Hawks | 46 - 31 | Canterbury (BP) |
| | Report |

Dry Leas
Attendance: 525
Referee: Rowan Kitt

3 November 2012
15:00

| (BP) Southend Saxons | 55 - 14 | Barking |
| | Report |

Warners Bridge Park
Attendance: 281
Referee: Alex Manley

Bye: Taunton Titans

=== Round 11 ===
10 November 2012
14:00

| (BP) Worthing Raiders | 49 - 5 | Henley Hawks |
| | Report |

Roundstone Lane
Attendance: 422
Referee: Rob Warburton

10 November 2012
14:30

| Bournemouth | 30 - 27 | Taunton Titans (2BP) |
| | Report |

Chapel Gate
Attendance: 400
Referee: Keith Lewis

10 November 2012
14:30

| (BP) Chinnor | 26 - 22 | Shelford (2BP) |
| | Report |

Kingsey Road
Attendance: 381
Referee: Guy Steel Bodger

10 November 2012
14:30

| Redruth | 21 - 0 | Dings Crusaders |
| | Report |

The Recreation Ground
Attendance: 931
Referee: Shane Lewis

10 November 2012
15:00

| (2BP) Barking | 33 - 40 | Clifton |
| | Report |

Goresbrook
Attendance: 90
Referee: Fergus Kirby

10 November 2012
15:00

| (BP) Canterbury | 51 - 14 | Southend Saxons |
| | Report |

Merton Lane
Attendance: 231
Referee: Paul Kimber

10 November 2012
15:00

| Lydney | 16 - 46 | Hartpury College (BP) |
| | Report |

Regentsholme
Attendance: 279
Referee: Tom Foley

Bye: Launceston

=== Round 12 ===
17 November 2012
14:30

| (BP) Bournemouth | 22 - 27 | Launceston |
| | Report |

Chapel Gate
Attendance: 250
Referee: Paul Kimber

17 November 2012
14:30

| (BP) Clifton | 37 - 36 | Canterbury (2BP) |
| | Report |

Station Road
Attendance: 228
Referee: Phil Watters

17 November 2012
14:30

| Dings Crusaders | 25 - 35 | Hartpury College |
| | Report |

Landseer Avenue
Attendance: 173
Referee: John Healy

17 November 2012
14:30

| Shelford | 6 - 28 | Redruth (BP) |
| | Report |

The Davey Field
Attendance: 339
Referee: Gareth Holsgrove

17 November 2012
15:00

| (BP) Henley Hawks | 32 - 9 | Chinnor |
| | Report |

Dry Leas
Attendance: 495
Referee: Marcus Caton

17 November 2012
15:00

| (BP) Southend Saxons | 29 - 43 | Worthing Raiders (BP) |
| | Report |

Warners Bridge Park
Attendance: 100
Referee: James Sullivan

17 November 2012
15:00

| (BP) Taunton Titans | 78 - 0 | Barking |
| | Report |

Hyde Park
Attendance: 240
Referee: Douglas Neagle

Bye: Lydney

=== Round 13 ===
24 November 2012
14:00

| (BP) Worthing Raiders | 58 - 3 | Clifton |
| | Report |

Roundstone Lane
Attendance: 387
Referee: James Sullivan

24 November 2012
14:30

| Chinnor | 22 - 5 | Southend Saxons |
| | Report |

Kingsey Road
Attendance: 188
Referee: Karl Kirkpatrick

24 November 2012
14:30

| (BP) Hartpury College | 42 - 7 | Shelford |
| | Report |

College Stadium
Attendance: 200
Referee: Alex Manley

24 November 2012
14:30

| Redruth | 17 - 11 | Henley Hawks (BP) |
| | Report |

The Recreation Ground
Attendance: 655
Referee: John Healy

24 November 2012
15:00

| Barking | 0 - 61 | Launceston (BP) |
| | Report |

Goresbrook
Attendance: 90
Referee: Keith Lewis

24 November 2012
15:00

| (BP) Canterbury | 29 - 10 | Taunton Titans |
| | Report |

Merton Lane
Attendance: 113
Referee: Mike Cooper

24 December 2012

| Lydney | P - P | Dings Crusaders |

- Postponed. Game to be rescheduled to 1 December 2012.

Bye: Bournemouth

=== Round 13 (Rescheduled Game) ===
1 December 2012
15:00

| Lydney | 35 - 33 | Dings Crusaders (2BP) |
| | Report |

Regentsholme
Attendance: 363
Referee: Nick Williams

- Game rescheduled from 24 November 2012.

=== Round 14 ===
8 December 2012
14:00

| Henley Hawks | 22 - 20 | Hartpury College (BP) |
| | Report |

Dry Leas
Attendance: 495
Referee: Shane Lewis

8 December 2012
14:15

| (BP) Shelford | 32 - 23 | Dings Crusaders |
| | Report |

The Davey Field
Attendance: 247
Referee: Will Halford

8 December 2012
14:30

| (BP) Bournemouth | 18 - 24 | Lydney |
| | Report |

Chapel Gate
Attendance: 200
Referee: Phil Watters

8 December 2012
14:30

| (2BP) Clifton | 50 - 52 | Chinnor (BP) |
| | Report |

Station Road
Attendance: 320
Referee: Luke Haskins

8 December 2012
14:30

| (BP) Launceston | 34 - 27 | Canterbury (BP) |
| | Report |

Polson Bridge
Attendance: 514
Referee: Paul Kimber

8 December 2012
15:00

| (BP) Southend Saxons | 15 - 22 | Redruth |
| | Report |

Warners Bridge Park
Attendance: 140
Referee: James Sullivan

8 December 2012
15:00

| (BP) Taunton Titans | 40 - 57 | Worthing Raiders (BP) |
| | Report |

Hyde Park
Attendance: 645
Referee: Richard Harding

Bye: Barking

=== Round 15 ===
15 December 2012
14:00

| (BP) Redruth | 39 - 11 | Clifton |
| | Report |

The Recreation Ground
Attendance: 749
Referee: Paul Kimber

15 December 2012
14:00

| (BP) Worthing Raiders | 28 - 12 | Launceston |
| | Report |

Roundstone Lane
Attendance: 512
Referee: Alex Manley

15 December 2012
14:30

| Chinnor | 29 - 19 | Taunton Titans |
| | Report |

Kingsey Road
Attendance: 327
Referee: Keith Lewis

15 December 2012
14:30

| (BP) Hartpury College | 39 - 8 | Southend Saxons |
| | Report |

College Stadium
Attendance: 200
Referee: Graham Dickens

15 December 2012
15:00

| Barking | 10 - 38 | Bournemouth (BP) |
| | Report |

Goresbrook
Attendance: 90
Referee: Fergus Kirby

15 December 2012
15:00

| Lydney | 22 - 17 | Shelford (BP) |
| | Report |

Regentsholme
Attendance: 343
Referee: James Sullivan

15 December 2012
15:30

| Dings Crusaders | 25 - 22 | Henley Hawks (BP) |
| | Report |

Landseer Avenue
Attendance: 120
Referee: John Healy

Bye: Canterbury

=== Round 16 ===
21 December 2012
19:45

| (BP) Clifton | 15 - 21 | Dings Crusaders |
| | Report |

Station Road
Attendance: 900
Referee: Nick Williams

22 December 2012

| Barking | 10 - 43 | Canterbury (BP) |
| | Report |

Goresbrook
Attendance: 153
Referee: Rowan Kitt

22 December 2012

| Bournemouth | P - P | Worthing Raiders |

- Postponed. Game rescheduled to 9 February 2013.

22 December 2012

| Launceston | P - P | Redruth |

- Postponed. Game rescheduled to 9 February 2013.

22 December 2012

| Lydney | P - P | Henley Hawks |

- Postponed. Game rescheduled to 9 February 2013.

22 December 2012

| Southend Saxons | P - P | Shelford |

- Postponed. Game rescheduled to 9 February 2013.

22 December 2012

| Taunton Titans | P - P | Hartpury College |

- Postponed. Game rescheduled to 9 February 2013.

Bye: Chinnor

=== Round 17 ===
5 January 2013
14:00

| Hartpury College | 18 - 26 | Launceston |
| | Report |

College Stadium
Attendance: 200
Referee: Tom Foley

5 January 2013
14:00

| (BP) Worthing Raiders | 61 - 0 | Barking |
| | Report |

Roundstone Lane
Attendance: 387
Referee: Paul Kimber

5 January 2013
14:15

| (BP) Shelford | 29 - 22 | Clifton (2BP) |
| | Report |

The Davey Field
Attendance: 329
Referee: Craig Maxwell Keys

5 January 2013
14:30

| (BP) Chinnor | 43 - 22 | Bournemouth |
| | Report |

Kingsey Road
Attendance: 427
Referee: Fergus Kirby

5 January 2013
14:30

| Dings Crusaders | 26 - 7 | Taunton Titans |
| | Report |

Landseer Avenue
Attendance: 105
Referee: James Sullivan

5 January 2013
15:00

| Canterbury | 22 - 9 | Lydney |
| | Report |

Merton Lane
Attendance: 131
Referee: Simon Harding

5 January 2013
15:00

| (BP) Henley Hawks | 81 - 12 | Southend Saxons |
| | Report |

Dry Leas
Attendance: 425
Referee: Rob Warburton

Bye: Redruth

=== Round 18 ===
12 January 2013
14:30

| Bournemouth | 3 - 26 | Redruth (BP) |
| | Report |

Chapel Gate
Attendance: 250

12 January 2013
14:30

| Clifton | 15 - 63 | Henley Hawks (BP) |
| | Report |

Station Road
Attendance: 100
Referee: Mike Cooper

12 January 2013
14:30

| (BP) Launceston | 32 - 10 | Dings Crusaders |
| | Report |

Polson Bridge
Attendance: 579
Referee: Phil Watters

12 January 2013
15:00

| (BP) Barking | 36 - 24 | Chinnor |
| | Report |

Goresbrook
Attendance: 120
Referee: Alex Manley

12 January 2013
15:00

| Canterbury | 17 - 38 | Worthing Raiders (BP) |
| | Report |

Merton Lane
Attendance: 155
Referee: Keith Lewis

12 January 2013
15:00

| Lydney | 24 - 22 | Southend Saxons (BP) |
| | Report |

Regentsholme
Attendance: 297
Referee: Guy Steel Bodger

12 January 2013

| Taunton Titans | P - P | Shelford |

- Postponed. Game rescheduled to 23 February 2013.

Bye: Hartpury College

=== Round 19 ===
19 January 2013

| Chinnor | P - P | Canterbury |

- Postponed. Game rescheduled to 9 February 2013.

19 January 2013

| Hartpury College | P - P | Bournemouth |

- Postponed. Game rescheduled to 23 February 2013.

19 January 2013

| Henley Hawks | P - P | Taunton Titans |

- Postponed. Game rescheduled to 16 March 2013.

19 January 2013

| Redruth | P - P | Barking |

- Postponed. Game rescheduled to 23 February 2013.

19 January 2013

| Shelford | P - P | Launceston |

- Postponed. Game rescheduled to 16 March 2013.

19 January 2013

| Southend Saxons | P - P | Clifton |

- Postponed. Game rescheduled to 23 February 2013.

19 January 2013

| Worthing Raiders | P - P | Lydney |

- Postponed. Game rescheduled to 23 February 2013.

Bye: Dings Crusaders

=== Round 20 ===
26 January 2013
14:00

| (BP) Worthing Raiders | 31 - 15 | Chinnor |
| | Report |

Roundstone Lane
Attendance: 334
Referee: Luke Haskins

26 January 2013
14:30

| Launceston | 19 - 15 | Henley Hawks (BP) |
| | Report |

Polson Bridge
Attendance: 563
Referee: John Healy

26 January 2013
15:00

| Barking | 12 - 45 | Hartpury College (BP) |
| | Report |

Goresbrook
Attendance: 75
Referee: Fergus Kirby

26 January 2013
15:00

| (BP) Lydney | 6 - 13 | Clifton |
| | Report |

Regentsholme
Attendance: 439
Referee: Phil Watters

26 January 2013

| Bournemouth | P - P | Dings Crusaders |

- Postponed. Game rescheduled to 4 May 2013.

26 January 2013

| Canterbury | P - P | Redruth |

- Postponed. Game rescheduled to 16 March 2013.

26 January 2013

| Taunton Titans | P - P | Southend Saxons |

- Postponed. Game rescheduled to 4 May 2013.

Bye: Shelford

=== Round 21 ===
2 February 2013
14:00

| (BP) Redruth | 26 - 22 | Worthing Raiders (BP) |
| | Report |

The Recreation Ground
Attendance: 810
Referee: Nick Williams

2 February 2013
14:30

| Chinnor | 29 - 17 | Lydney |
| | Report |

Kingsey Road
Attendance: 301

2 February 2013
14:30

| Clifton | 10 - 28 | Taunton Titans (BP) |
| | Report |

Station Road
Attendance: 80
Referee: Craig Maxwell Keys

2 February 2013
14:30

| (2BP) Hartpury College | 29 - 31 | Canterbury (BP) |
| | Report |

College Stadium
Attendance: 200
Referee: David Procter

2 February 2013
14:30

| Shelford | 30 - 15 | Bournemouth |
| | Report |

The Davey Field
Attendance: 221
Referee: Mark Liddell

2 February 2013
15:00

| Southend Saxons | 20 - 17 | Launceston (BP) |
| | Report |

Warners Bridge Park
Attendance: 85
Referee: Rob Warburton

2 February 2013

| Dings Crusaders | P - P | Barking |

- Postponed. Game rescheduled to 9 February 2013.

Bye: Henley Hawks

=== Rounds 16, 19 & 21 (Rescheduled Games) ===
9 February 2013
14:00

| Taunton Titans | 11 - 27 | Hartpury College |
| | Report |

Hyde Park
Attendance: 300
Referee: Paul Kimber

- Rescheduled from 22 December 2012.

9 February 2013
14:30

| Bournemouth | 15 - 43 | Worthing Raiders (BP) |
| | Report |

Chapel Gate
Attendance: 300
Referee: Richard Kelly

- Rescheduled from 22 December 2012.

9 February 2013
14:30

| Chinnor | 31 - 18 | Canterbury |
| | Report |

Kingsey Road
Attendance: 271

- Rescheduled from 19 January 2013.

9 February 2013
14:30

| Dings Crusaders | 32 - 10 | Barking |
| | Report |

Landseer Avenue
Attendance: 110

- Rescheduled from 2 February 2013.

9 February 2013
14:30

| (BP) Launceston | 9 - 10 | Redruth |
| | Report |

Polson Bridge
Attendance: 1,327
Referee: Tom Foley

- Rescheduled from 22 December 2012.

9 February 2013
15:00

| Lydney | 15 - 25 | Henley Hawks |
| | Report |

Regentsholme
Attendance: 307
Referee: Fergus Kirby

- Rescheduled from 22 December 2012.

9 February 2013
15:00

| (BP) Southend Saxons | 13 - 14 | Shelford |
| | Report |

Warners Bridge Park
Attendance: 100
Referee: Max Marsen

- Rescheduled from 22 December 2012.

=== Round 22 ===
16 February 2013
14:00

| Worthing Raiders | 27 - 22 | Hartpury College (BP) |
| | Report |

Roundstone Lane
Attendance: 382
Referee: Terry Hall

16 February 2013
14:30

| (BP) Bournemouth | 33 - 56 | Henley Hawks (BP) |
| | Report |

Chapel Gate
Attendance: 302
Referee: Mike Cooper

16 February 2013
14:30

| (BP) Chinnor | 35 - 34 | Redruth (2BP) |
| | Report |

Kingsey Road
Attendance: 412

16 February 2013
14:30

| (BP) Launceston | 39 - 21 | Clifton |
| | Report |

Polson Bridge
Attendance: 902
Referee: Paul Kimber

16 February 2013
15:00

| Barking | 5 - 54 | Shelford (BP) |
| | Report |

Goresbrook
Attendance: 90
Referee: Rowan Kitt

16 February 2013
15:00

| (BP) Canterbury | 41 - 12 | Dings Crusaders |
| | Report |

Merton Lane
Attendance: 252
Referee: Brendan Fitzmaurice

16 February 2013
15:00

| Lydney | 25 - 24 | Taunton Titans (BP) |
| | Report |

Regentsholme
Attendance: 518
Referee: Luke Haskins

Bye: Southend Saxons

=== Rounds 18 & 19 (Rescheduled Games) ===
23 February 2013
14:00

| (BP) Hartpury College | 57 - 32 | Bournemouth (BP) |
| | Report |

College Stadium
Attendance: 275
Referee: John Healy

- Rescheduled from 19 January 2013.

23 February 2013
14:00

| Redruth | 46 - 17 | Barking |
| | Report |

The Recreation Ground
Attendance: 688
Referee: Nick Williams

- Rescheduled from 19 January 2013.

23 February 2013
14:00

| (BP) Worthing Raiders | 53 - 0 | Lydney |
| | Report |

Roundstone Lane
Attendance: 334
Referee: Richard Harding

- Rescheduled from 19 January 2013.

23 February 2013
15:00

| (BP) Southend Saxons | 48 - 24 | Clifton (BP) |
| | Report |

Warners Bridge Park
Attendance: 150
Referee: Shaun Spilsbury

- Rescheduled from 19 January 2013.

23 February 2013
15:00

| Taunton Titans | 28 - 12 | Shelford |
| | Report |

Hyde Park
Attendance: 200
Referee: Paul Kimber

- Rescheduled from 12 January 2013.

=== Round 23 ===
2 March 2013
14:30

| (BP) Hartpury College | 52 - 7 | Chinnor |
| | Report |

College Stadium
Attendance: 450
Referee: Fergus Kirby

2 March 2013
14:30

| (BP) Dings Crusaders | 26 - 45 | Worthing Raiders (BP) |
| | Report |

Landseer Avenue
Attendance: 150
Referee: Mark Liddell

2 March 2013
14:30

| (BP) Shelford | 40 - 31 | Canterbury (BP) |
| | Report |

The Davey Field
Attendance: 278
Referee: Stephen Rainey

2 March 2013
15:00

| (BP) Henley Hawks | 65 - 7 | Barking |
| | Report |

Dry Leas
Attendance: 380
Referee: Graham Dickens

2 March 2013
15:00

| (BP) Redruth | 69 - 0 | Lydney |
| | Report |

The Recreation Ground
Attendance: 853
Referee: Luke Haskins

2 March 2013
14:30

| (BP) Southend Saxons | 32 - 23 | Bournemouth |
| | Report |

Warners Bridge Park
Attendance: 200
Referee: James Sullivan

2 March 2013
15:00

| (BP) Taunton Titans | 17 - 22 | Launceston |
| | Report |

Hyde Park
Attendance: 627
Referee: Nick Williams

Bye: Clifton

=== Round 24 ===
9 March 2013
14:30

| (BP) Bournemouth | 35 - 26 | Clifton (BP) |
| | Report |

Chapel Gate
Attendance: 200
Referee: Nick Cockburn

9 March 2013
14:30

| (BP) Chinnor | 17 - 21 | Dings Crusaders |
| | Report |

Kingsey Road
Attendance: 410
Referee: Karl Kirkpatrick

9 March 2013
15:00

| Barking | 10 - 28 | Southend Saxons (BP) |
| | Report |

Goresbrook
Attendance: 135
Referee: Fergus Kirby

9 March 2013
15:00

| Canterbury | 5 - 31 | Henley Hawks (BP) |
| | Report |

Merton Lane
Attendance: 121
Referee: Paul Kimber

9 March 2013
15:00

| Lydney | 19 - 17 | Launceston (BP) |
| | Report |

Regentsholme
Attendance: 343
Referee: Phil Watters

9 March 2013
15:00

| (BP) Redruth | 19 - 26 | Hartpury College |
| | Report |

The Recreation Ground
Attendance: 923
Referee: Dean Richards

9 March 2013
15:00

| (BP) Worthing Raiders | 47 - 3 | Shelford |
| | Report |

Roundstone Lane
Attendance: 396
Referee: Rob Warburton

Bye: Taunton Titans

=== Rounds 19 & 20 (Rescheduled Games) ===
16 March 2013
14:15

| Shelford | 16 - 15 | Launceston (BP) |
| | Report |

The Davey Field
Attendance: 269
Referee: Shaun Spilsbury

- Rescheduled from 19 January 2013.

16 March 2013
15:00

| Canterbury | 20 - 12 | Redruth |
| | Report |

Merton Lane
Attendance: 123
Referee: Fergus Kirby

- Rescheduled from 26 February 2013.

16 March 2013
15:00

| (BP) Henley Hawks | 68 - 15 | Taunton Titans |
| | Report |

Dry Leas
Attendance: 1,620
Referee: Max Marsden

- Rescheduled from 19 January 2013.

=== Round 25 ===
23 March 2013
14:30

| Dings Crusaders | 18 - 14 | Redruth (BP) |
| | Report |

Landseer Avenue
Attendance: 202
Referee: Luke Haskins

23 March 2013
15:00

| Southend Saxons | 19 - 11 | Canterbury |
| | Report |

Warners Bridge Park
Attendance: 125

23 March 2013

| Clifton | P - P | Barking |

- Postponed. Game rescheduled to 4 May 2013.

23 March 2013

| Hartpury College | P - P | Lydney |

- Postponed. Game rescheduled to 4 May 2013.

23 March 2013

| Henley Hawks | P - P | Worthing Raiders |

- Postponed. Game rescheduled to 4 May 2013.

23 March 2013

| Shelford | P - P | Chinnor |

- Postponed. Game rescheduled to 4 May 2013.

23 March 2013

| Taunton Titans | P - P | Bournemouth |

- Postponed. Game rescheduled to 11 May 2013.

Bye: Launceston

=== Round 26 ===
30 March 2013
14:30

| Chinnor | 9 - 41 | Henley Hawks (BP) |
| | Report |

Kingsey Road
Attendance: 421
Referee: Fergus Kirby

30 March 2013
14:30

| (BP) Hartpury College | 64 - 17 | Dings Crusaders |
| | Report |

College Stadium
Attendance: 300
Referee: Morgan Whitehead

30 March 2013
14:30

| (BP) Launceston | 35 - 22 | Bournemouth |
| | Report |

Polson Bridge
Attendance: 455
Referee: John Healy

30 March 2013
15:00

| Barking | 0 - 65 | Taunton Titans (BP) |
| | Report |

Goresbrook
Attendance: 67
Referee: Brendan Fitzmaurice

30 March 2013
15:00

| (BP) Canterbury | 27 - 26 | Clifton (BP) |
| | Report |

Merton Lane
Attendance: 213
Referee: Terry Hall

30 March 2013
15:00

| Redruth | 28 - 36 | Shelford (BP) |
| | Report |

The Recreation Ground
Attendance: 746
Referee: Craig Maxwell Keys

30 March 2013
15:00

| (BP) Worthing Raiders | 30 - 28 | Southend Saxons (BP) |
| | Report |

Roundstone Lane
Attendance: 328
Referee: Matthew O'Grady

Bye: Lydney

=== Round 27 ===
6 April 2013
14:30

| Clifton | 21 - 38 | Worthing Raiders (BP) |
| | Report |

Station Road
Attendance: 245
Referee: Luke Haskins

6 April 2013
14:30

| Dings Crusaders | 24 - 3 | Lydney |
| | Report |

Landseer Avenue
Attendance: 250
Referee: Paul Kimber

6 April 2013
15:00

| (BP) Launceston | 74 - 10 | Barking |
| | Report |

Polson Bridge
Attendance: 519
Referee: Nick Williams

6 April 2013
15:00

| (BP) Henley Hawks | 65 - 19 | Redruth |
| | Report |

Dry Leas
Attendance: 620
Referee: Philip Davis

6 April 2013
15:00

| Shelford | 18 - 39 | Hartpury College (BP) |
| | Report |

The Davey Field
Attendance: 244
Referee: Rob Warburton

6 April 2013
15:00

| (BP) Southend Saxons | 36 - 35 | Chinnor (2BP) |
| | Report |

Warners Bridge Park
Attendance: 130
Referee: Rowan Kitt

6 April 2013
15:00

| (BP) Taunton Titans | 31 - 17 | Canterbury |
| | Report |

Hyde Park
Attendance: 325
Referee: Fergus Kirby

Bye: Bournemouth

=== Round 28 ===
13 April 2013
14:00

| (BP) Hartpury College | 12 - 16 | Henley Hawks |
| | Report |

College Stadium
Attendance: 800
Referee: Andrew Taylorson

13 April 2013
14:30

| (BP) Chinnor | 33 - 12 | Clifton |
| | Report |

Kingsey Road
Attendance: 411
Referee: Andrew Vertigan

13 April 2013
14:30

| (BP) Dings Crusaders | 17 - 20 | Shelford |
| | Report |

Landseer Avenue
Attendance: 123
Referee: Richard Harding

13 April 2013
15:00

| Canterbury | 10 - 0 | Launceston |
| | Report |

Merton Lane
Attendance: 243
Referee: Alex Manley

13 April 2013
15:00

| Lydney | 19 - 8 | Bournemouth |
| | Report |

Regentsholme
Attendance: 606
Referee: Fergus Kirby

13 April 2013
15:00

| (BP) Redruth | 38 - 22 | Southend Saxons |
| | Report |

The Recreation Ground
Attendance: 624
Referee: Phil Watters

13 April 2013
15:00

| (BP) Worthing Raiders | 68 - 0 | Taunton Titans |
| | Report |

Roundstone Lane
Attendance: 628
Referee: Paul Kimber

Bye: Barking

=== Round 29 ===
20 April 2013
14:30

| (BP) Bournemouth | 62 - 12 | Barking |
| | Report |

Chapel Gate
Attendance: 400

20 April 2013
14:30

| (BP) Clifton | 50 - 17 | Redruth |
| | Report |

Station Road
Attendance: 151
Referee: Mike Cooper

20 April 2013
15:00

| (BP) Henley Hawks | 62 - 17 | Dings Crusaders |
| | Report |

Dry Leas
Attendance: 545
Referee: Alex Manley

20 April 2013
15:00

| Launceston | 7 - 19 | Worthing Raiders |
| | Report |

Polson Bridge
Attendance: 947
Referee: Tom Davis

20 April 2013
15:00

| (BP) Shelford | 41 - 18 | Lydney |
| | Report |

The Davey Field
Attendance: 281
Referee: Andrew Vertigan

20 April 2013
15:00

| (BP) Southend Saxons | 31 - 41 | Hartpury College (BP) |
| | Report |

Warners Bridge Park
Attendance: 250
Referee: Graham Dickens

20 April 2013
15:00

| (BP) Taunton Titans | 53 - 26 | Chinnor (BP) |
| | Report |

Hyde Park
Attendance: 451
Referee: Nick Williams

Bye: Canterbury

=== Round 30 ===
27 April 2013
14:30

| (BP) Chinnor | 27 - 13 | Launceston |
| | Report |

Kingsey Road
Attendance: 412

27 April 2013
14:30

| (BP) Dings Crusaders | 40 - 38 | Southend Saxons (2BP) |
| | Report |

Landseer Avenue
Attendance: 139
Referee: Phil Watters

27 April 2013
14:30

| (BP) Hartpury College | 72 - 3 | Clifton |
| | Report |

College Stadium
Attendance: 250
Referee: Rowan Kitt

27 April 2013
15:00

| Barking | 14 - 31 | Lydney (BP) |
| | Report |

Goresbrook
Attendance: 165
Referee: Paul Kimber

27 April 2013
15:00

| Canterbury | 12 - 31 | Bournemouth (BP) |
| | Report |

Merton Lane
Attendance: 323
Referee: Rob Warburton

27 April 2013
15:00

| (BP) Redruth | 45 - 40 | Taunton Titans (2BP) |
| | Report |

The Recreation Ground
Attendance: 823
Referee: John Healy

27 April 2013
15:00

| Shelford | 8 - 32 | Henley Hawks (BP) |
| | Report |

The Davey Field
Attendance: 469
Referee: Richard Kelly

Bye: Worthing Raiders

=== Rounds 20 & 25 (Rescheduled Games) ===
4 May 2013
14:30

| (BP) Bournemouth | 29 - 14 | Dings Crusaders |
| | Report |

Chapel Gate
Attendance: 400

- Rescheduled from 26 January 2013.

4 May 2013
14:30

| (BP) Clifton | 71 - 33 | Barking (BP) |
| | Report |

Station Road
Attendance: 200
Referee: Nick Williams

- Rescheduled from 23 March 2013.

4 May 2013
14:30

| (BP) Hartpury College | 29 - 25 | Lydney (BP) |
| | Report |

College Stadium
Attendance: 280
Referee: Rob Warburton

- Rescheduled from 23 March 2013.

4 May 2013
15:00

| (BP) Henley Hawks | 55 - 27 | Worthing Raiders |
| | Report |

Dry Leas
Attendance: 3,270
Referee: Tom Davis

- Rescheduled from 23 March 2013.

4 May 2013
15:00

| (BP) Shelford | 27 - 19 | Chinnor |
| | Report |

The Davey Field
Attendance: 153
Referee: Duncan McClement

- Rescheduled from 23 March 2013.

4 May 2013
15:00

| (2BP) Taunton Titans | 22 - 25 | Southend Saxons |
| | Report |

Hyde Park
Attendance: 311
Referee: James Sullivan

- Rescheduled from 26 January 2013.

=== Round 25 (Rescheduled Game) ===
11 May
15:00

| Taunton Titans | 31 - 23 | Bournemouth |
| | Report |

Hyde Park
Attendance: 425
Referee: Will Halford

- Rescheduled from 23 March 2013.

== Promotion play–off ==
Each season, the runners–up in the National League 2 South and National League 2 North participate in a play–off for promotion into National League 1. The team with the best playing record, in this case northern runners up Stourbridge, would gain the home advantage with southern runners up Worthing Raiders having to travel up to the Midlands for the game.

11 May 2013
15:00

| Stourbridge | 26 – 28 | Worthing Raiders |
| | Stourbridge; Worthing Raiders |

Stourton Park
Attendance: 925
Referee: Nick Cockburn

== Total Season Attendances ==
| Club | Home Games | Total | Average | Highest | Lowest | % Capacity |
|---|---|---|---|---|---|---|
| Barking | 14 | 1,430 | 102 | 165 | 67 | 10% |
| Bournemouth | 14 | 4,502 | 322 | 400 | 200 | 21% |
| Canterbury | 14 | 2,733 | 195 | 323 | 113 | 13% |
| Chinnor | 14 | 5,075 | 363 | 428 | 188 | 18% |
| Clifton | 14 | 3,174 | 227 | 900 | 80 | 10% |
| Dings Crusaders | 14 | 2,168 | 155 | 250 | 105 | 10% |
| Hartpury College | 14 | 4,105 | 293 | 800 | 150 | 15% |
| Henley Hawks | 14 | 10,134 | 724 | 3,270 | 206 | 18% |
| Launceston | 14 | 8,474 | 605 | 1,327 | 388 | 20% |
| Lydney | 14 | 5,260 | 376 | 606 | 279 | 13% |
| Redruth | 14 | 11,376 | 813 | 1,140 | 624 | 23% |
| Shelford | 14 | 3,893 | 278 | 469 | 132 | 14% |
| Southend Saxons | 14 | 2,018 | 144 | 281 | 85 | 10% |
| Taunton Titans | 14 | 6,039 | 431 | 917 | 200 | 22% |
| Worthing Raiders | 14 | 5,777 | 413 | 628 | 328 | 28% |

== Individual statistics ==
- Note that points scorers includes tries as well as conversions, penalties and drop goals. Does not include North - South playoff game.

=== Top Points Scorers ===
| Rank | Player | Team | Appearances | Points |
|---|---|---|---|---|
| 1 | (England) Mark Woodrow | Dings Crusaders | 25 | 289 |
| 2 | (England) Kieron Lewitt | Launceston | 26 | 262 |
| 3 | (England) Joseph Govett | Worthing Raiders | 27 | 260 |
| 4 | (England) Gary Kingdom | Taunton Titans | 27 | 214 |
| 5 | (England) Paul Thirlby | Redruth | 26 | 197 |
| 6 | (England) Craig Jackson | Hartpury College | 23 | 196 |
| 7 | (England) James Combden | Henley Hawks | 14 | 181 |
| 8 | (England) Will Robinson | Henley Hawks | 12 | 164 |
| 9 | (England) Ben Roberts | Clifton | 23 | 160 |
| 10 | (England) Anthony Wicks | Southend | 24 | 155 |
| 10 | (Ireland) Scott Browne | Canterbury | 25 | 155 |

=== Top Try Scorers ===
| Rank | Player | Team | Appearances | Tries |
|---|---|---|---|---|
| 1 | (England) Ian Clark | Hartpury College | 20 | 20 |
| 1 | (England) Alexander Nielsen | Worthing Raiders | 22 | 20 |
| 2 | (England) Tom Duncan | Redruth | 20 | 19 |
| 2 | (England) Jack Maslen | Worthing Raiders | 23 | 19 |
| 2 | (Mauritius) Xavier Andre | Henley Hawks | 25 | 19 |
| 3 | (England) Robbie Stapley | Henley Hawks | 28 | 18 |
| 4 | (New Zealand) Wim Baars | Canterbury | 25 | 17 |
| 4 | (England) Lewis Paterson | Launceston | 26 | 17 |
| 5 | (Tonga) Feofaaku Lea | Shelford | 26 | 16 |
| 6 | (England) Robert Smith | Worthing Raiders | 22 | 15 |

== Season records ==
=== Team ===
Largest home win — 78 pts

74 - 0 Taunton Titans at home to Barking on 17 November 2012

Largest away win — 83 pts

85 - 3 Henley Hawks away to Barking on 27 October 2012

Most points scored — 85 pts

85 - 3 Henley Hawks away to Barking on 27 October 2012

Most tries in a match — 13

Henley Hawks away to Barking on 27 October 2012

Most conversions in a match — 10

Henley Hawks away to Barking on 27 October 2012

Most penalties in a match — 7 (x2)

Hartpury College away to Dings Crusaders on 17 November 2012
Dings Crusaders away to Lydney on 1 December 2012

Most drop goals in a match — 2 (x2)

Launceston away to Hartpury College on 5 January 2013
Southend Saxons away to Worthing Raiders on 30 March 2013

=== Player ===
Most points in a match — 29

(England) Kieron Lewitt for Launceston at home to Barking on 6 April 2013

Most tries in a match — 5

(England) Gareth Evans for Hartpury College at home to Clifton on 27 April 2013

Most conversions in a match — 10

(England) James Combden for Henley Hawks away to Barking on 27 October 2012

Most penalties in a match — 7 (x2)

(England) Luke Cozens for Hartpury College away to Dings Crusaders on 17 November 2012
(England) Danial Trigg for Dings Crusaders away to Lydney on 1 December 2012

Most drop goals in a match — 2 (x2)

(England) Jake Murphy for Launceston away to Hartpury College on 5 January 2013
(England) Robert Kirby for Southend Saxons away to Worthing Raiders on 30 March 2013

=== Attendances ===
Highest — 3,270

Henley Hawks at home against Worthing Raiders on 4 May 2013

Lowest — 67

Barking at home against Taunton Titans on 30 March 20131

Highest Average Attendance — 724

Redruth

Lowest Average Attendance — 102

Barking

== See also ==
- English rugby union system
- Rugby union in England
