= Launceston Rugby Club =

Rugby union club based in Launceston, Cornwall

Cornish All Blacks
- Full name: Launceston Rugby Club
- Union: Cornwall RFU
- Nickname: Cornish All Blacks
- Founded: 1948; 78 years ago
- Location: Launceston, Cornwall, England
- Ground: Polson Bridge (Capacity: 3,000 (194 seats))
- Chairman: Andrew Crichton
- President: Merv Yeo
- Coach: Ryan Westren / Ian Goldsmith
- Captain: Thomas Sandercock
- League: Regional 1 South West
- 2025–26: 8th
Team kit

Official website
- launceston.rfu.club

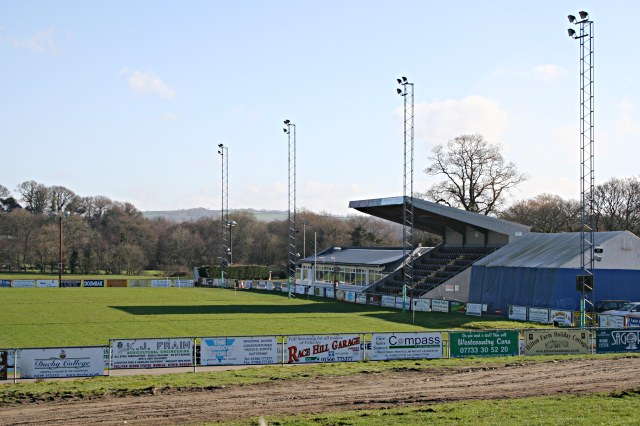
Polson Bridge, home of Launceston Rugby Club

Launceston Rugby Club (also known as the Cornish All Blacks, the name of the 1st team) is a Cornish rugby club which play at Polson Bridge, Launceston, Cornwall. They are currently in Regional 1 South West, at the fifth tier of the English rugby union system following their promotion from Tribute South West 1 West via a play-off in 2019. At present the club fields two senior men's teams, colts (under-18), mini/junior sides (ages 7 to 16), as well as several girls teams (ranging from under-13 to under-18).

== History ==
=== Foundation and early years ===
The club was founded in 1948 after an inaugural meeting chaired by the then Headmaster of Launceston College, Mr Spencer Toy, with Gordon Reeve, Eric Smith and Arthur Venning (who up until his death in February 2017 was still a club member). Mr Toy had introduced rugby union at the college in 1931, but no town team had been formed until after the war despite efforts being made during the mid-1930s. On 30 October 1948 Launceston Rugby Club played its first ever game away to Launceston College, winning 13-3 (3 tries to 1), with Reeve, Smith and Venning all featuring for the new team; Reeve himself scoring the final try, along with 2 conversions. By Spring 1949, the club had its own ground at Hurdon Road, rented from the council (now a factory site of its main sponsor DS Smith Plc), with scaffolding poles for goal posts and ex-army huts for changing rooms and a clubhouse. During the 1960s the club moved to another site when the Town Council sold the land, but again moved on in 1969 when the club had the vision to refuse becoming part of the proposed Sports Centre at Pennygillam, which they would have shared with Launceston Football Club. The ground at Polson Bridge was purchased in 1969, with developments such as floodlights, enlarged clubhouse, present changing rooms and finally the grandstand being added over the years. The first match at Polson was played on Boxing Day 1969 against a Derek Prout International XV - Derek being the club's first ever full international.

=== Rise up the leagues ===
In 1981 they then went on to win the Cornwall Senior Cup for the first of many since wins and started their remarkable climb to be one of the top 40 sides in England (from a town with a population of just over 7,000). LRFC gained promotion to National League Division 3 South (level 4) in 2000 and were runner-up in their first season, losing in the play-off away to National 3 North side Sedgley Park. The following season, 2001–02, LRFC were 2nd again, but this time won the play-off against Dudley Kingswinford, and were promoted to Division Two (level 3). They were unfortunate to be relegated after a most unusual series of results on the last day of the season. However, in 2003–04 Launceston bounced right back by again finishing second but winning the play-off away to Halifax. LRFC finished in 5th position in National League Division 2 (level 3) in 2004–05 and by the end of the 2006–07 season they had been promoted to English National Division 1 (level 2). On 26 April 2008, Launceston suffered a final day relegation to Division 2 (level 3) as an unexpected sequence of final day results saw relegation threatened Birmingham & Solihull and Sedgley Park pull off dramatic wins against Bedford and Rotherham respectively. The Cornish All Blacks were relegated when they had actually won more games than either of their two rivals. In truth the damage had been done earlier in the season when losses against Newbury (away), Nottingham (away), Sedgley Park (away), Birmingham & Solihull (away), Esher (home) came back to haunt the coaching staff and players.

=== Administration and decline ===
During the summer of 2010 Launceston Rugby Football Club Ltd went into administration, with a new company, Launceston Rugby Club Ltd being formed in its place. As a punishment the RFU gave the club a 20-point deduction going into the new season. This gave the club too much to do, and despite a brave attempt they were relegated from National League 1 at the end of the 2010-11 season. The club would spend a number of seasons in National League 2 South until the 2015-16 season. Despite having a promising team that made up the bulk of the Cornwall side that won the 2015 Bill Beaumont Cup, the relegation of nearby Plymouth Albion from the RFU Championship the previous season, would lead to almost the entire Launceston first team leaving to join the Devon club, where incidentally, Graham Dawe (the Cornwall head coach), was director of rugby. This, coupled with Launceston being on their third head coach in a little over a year, contributed to the worst season in the club's league history as they were relegated without winning a game. Despite improved performances the following season in National League 3 South West (including a win against rivals, Camborne) the club suffered their second successive relegation, dropping to Tribute South West 1 West.

=== New hope ===
By the end of the 2018–19 season, Launceston had come on leaps and bounds, finishing runner-up in the league behind local rivals, Okehampton, missing out on the title by just 3 points. Despite this defeat the club's league performances were good enough to book home advantage in the promotion play-off against South West 1 East runner-up, Old Centralians. The play-off game was held on 27 April 2019 at Polson Bridge in front of the biggest crowd seen in a number of seasons, with 1,200 in attendance. It started badly for the home side as Old Cents dominated the first half, which ended 0–19 to the visitors. However, the second half turned to be the complete opposite, as the Cornish All Blacks rallied, scoring five unanswered tries to win the game 33–22 and clinch promotion back to tier 5.

== Ground ==
Polson Bridge is situated on the Cornish side of the River Tamar, next to the bridge that gives the ground its name, about 1.5 miles east of the town of Launceston. The ground consists of a main pitch with flood-lights, with the stand on one side of the pitch and a long covered standing terrace on the other, two club-houses with bars including the executive suite, a gym, changing rooms and three additional pitches for 2nd XV and junior rugby. The ground also has a couple of car parks, although parking can be an issue at bigger games such as local derbies.

The original capacity of Polson Bridge, according to press reports, was thought to be around 6,000 but in the current ground this would be unsafe. A more realistic estimate of capacity around the main pitch would be 3,000, including 194 seats in the main stand and the rest standing. The club came close to achieving this capacity figure on 1 September 2007 when 2,995 supporters watched the club play a league game against the Cornish Pirates during the 2007–08 season. In recent times the club has enjoyed derby games against Redruth which have regularly attracted 1,000+ crowds.

== Season summary ==
Season	League			National Cup(s)		County Cup(s)	
Season	Competition/Level	Position	Points	Competition	Performance	Competition	Performance
1987–88	Western Counties (7)					Cornwall Cup	Runners up
1988–89	Western Counties (7)						
1989–90	Western Counties (7)						
1990–91	Western Counties (7)						
1991–92	Western Counties (7)					Cornwall Cup	Runners up
1992–93	Western Counties (7)	2nd					
1993–94	Western Counties (7)					Cornwall Cup	Winners
1994–95	Western Counties (7)	1st (promoted)		Pilkington Cup	3rd Round	Cornwall Cup	Runners up
1995–96	South West 2 (6)	1st (promoted)		Pilkington Cup	1st Round	Cornwall Cup	Winners
1996–97	South West 1 (5)	2nd	36	Pilkington Cup	1st Round	Cornwall Cup	Winners
1997–98	South West 1 (5)	2nd	35	Tetley's Bitter Cup	3rd Round	Cornwall Cup	Winners
1998–99	South West 1 (5)	2nd	40	Tetley's Bitter Cup	2nd Round	Cornwall Cup	Runners up
1999–00	South West 1 (5)	1st (promoted)	38	Tetley's Bitter Cup	1st Round	Cornwall Cup	Runners up
2000–01	National 3 South (4)	2nd (lost play-off)	52	Tetley's Bitter Cup	3rd Round	Cornwall Cup	Winners
2001–02	National 3 South (4)	2nd (promoted via play-off)	48	Powergen Cup	3rd Round		
2002–03	National 2 (3)	12th (relegated)	20	Powergen Cup	2nd Round	Cornwall Cup	Runners up
2003–04	National 3 South (4)	2nd (promoted via play-off)	44	Powergen Cup	4th Round	Cornwall Cup	Semi-finals
2004–05	National 2 (3)	5th	70 (Note: The 2004–05 season saw the introduction of bonus points into National League English rugby union (level 3-4).)	Powergen Cup	3rd Round	Cornwall Cup	Winners
2005–06	National 2 (3)	4th	76	Powergen Trophy	4th Round	Cornwall Cup	Winners
2006–07	National 2 (3)	2nd (promoted)	96	EDF Energy Cup	4th Round	Cornwall Cup	Semi-finals
2007–08	National 1 (2)	16th (relegated)	40	EDF Energy Trophy	Quarter-finals	Cornwall Super Cup	Runners up
2008–09	National 2 (3)	7th	70	EDF Energy Trophy	4th Round		
2009–10	National 1 (3) (Note: Note that changes to the league structure by the RFU for the 2009–10 season meant that National 2 was renamed to National 1.)	3rd	105			Cornwall Super Cup	Runners up
2010–11	National 1 (3)	16th (relegated) (Note: Launceston Rugby Football Club Ltd went into administration. A new company Launceston Rugby Club Ltd was formed. The RFU gave Launceston a 20-point deduction. Launcestons won only 10 of 30 games for a points total of 44 after the 20 point deduction. Ironically 64 points was the minimum to prevent relegation. Launceston were relegated along with Redruth and Otley.)	44				
2011–12	National 2 South (4) (Note: Note that changes to the league structure by the RFU for the 2009–10 season onwards meant that National Division 3 South was renamed National League 2 South.)	7th	80				
2012–13	National 2 South (4)	7th	74				
2013–14	National 2 South (4)	12th	66			Cornwall Super Cup	Winners
2014–15	National 2 South (4)	10th	66			Cornwall Super Cup	Runners-up
2015–16	National 2 South (4)	16th (relegated)	5			Cornwall Super Cup	Runners-up
2016–17	National 3 South West (5)	12th (relegated)	41			Cornwall Super Cup	Runners-up
2017–18	South West 1 West (6)	3rd	88			Cornwall Cup	Semi-finals
2018–19	South West 1 West (6)	2nd (promoted via play-off)	106			Cornwall Cup	1st Round
2019–20	South West Premier (5)	11th	53.87 (Note: The season was postponed and ultimately cancelled due to the COVID-19 pandemic in the United Kingdom with Launceston sitting in 11th, having played 19 games and gained 42 points. The remaining games were calculated on a 'best playing record formula', with Launceston remaining in 11th place with 53.87 points.)				
2020–21	South West Premier (5)	Cancelled due to COVID-19 pandemic in the United Kingdom.					
2021–22	South West Premier (5)	6th	64				
Green background stands for either league champions (with promotion) or cup winners. Blue background stands for promotion without winning league or losing cup finalists. Pink background stands for relegation.

== Honours ==
- Cornwall Merit Table champions: 1982–83
- Cornwall Cup winners (8): 1982–83, 1993–94, 1995–96, 1996–97, 1997–98, 2000–01, 2004–05, 2005–06
- Western Counties champions: 1994–95
- South West 2 champions: 1995–96
- South West 1 champions: 1999–00
- National Division Three (north v south) promotion play-off winners (2): 2001–02, 2003–04
- Cornwall Super Cup winners: 2013–14
- South West 1 (east v west) promotion play-off winners: 2018–19

== Notable players ==
- Graham Dawe – earned 5 caps with England and won 14 major trophies with Bath. Also had a successful coaching career winning league titles at club level with Plymouth Albion as well as county championships with both Devon and Cornwall.
- Matt Jess – capped by Cornwall and England Counties XV; went on to make over 100 appearances for Exeter Chiefs.
- Kieron Lewitt – former England U-19 international and Cornwall county player, who scored 1,193 points for the club.
- (England) Richard Nancekivell – started his rugby career with the club. Capped by Cornwall, scoring winning try in 1991 County Championship.
- Derek Prout – the club's first full international with 2 caps for England in the 1960s, as well as 41 caps for Cornwall. Born in the town, he started his early career as a schoolboy at the club before going on to play for the likes of Northampton and Harlequins. Died in 2005.
- (England) Jimmy Tucker – Cornish rugby legend with 50 caps and part of the side that won the 1999 County Championship. Spent 13 seasons at Launceston where he also enjoyed a 3-year spell as head coach.
- (England) Ryan Westren – centre who has spent over a decade at the club during three spells, and holds the club record for most league tries in a season (24). Has also played professional rugby with the Cornish Pirates and London Scottish as well as captaining Cornwall. Currently player-head coach at Launceston.

== See also ==
- Cornish rugby
