= Graham Dawe =

England international rugby union player

- Born: Richard Graham Reed Dawe; 4 September 1959 (age 67) Tavistock, Devon
- Height: 5 ft 11 in (1.80 m)
- Weight: 204 lb (14 st 8 lb; 93 kg)

Rugby union career
- Position: Hooker
Senior career
Years	Team	Apps	(Points)
- Bath Rugby
–	Sale Sharks		
–	Plymouth Albion		
–	Launceston		
International career
Years	Team	Apps	(Points)
1987-1995	England	5	(0)

Richard Graham Reed Dawe (born 4 September 1959 in Tavistock) is a former English rugby union footballer and the former coach of Plymouth Albion.

He played for Bath Rugby, Sale Sharks, Plymouth Albion and Launceston.

Dawe earned 5 caps for England, from 1987 to 1995. He made his debut in the Five Nations in 1987. He was selected for the Rugby World Cup finals in 1987, playing a single match, and again in 1995 when he played against Manu Samoa. That was his last England cap, earned at the age of 36, his international career being limited by the presence in the England team of Brian Moore.

He won 14 major trophies during 12 years at Bath before moving on to Sale and also represented the Barbarians, South West, Cornwall and Devon.

Dawe became player-coach of Plymouth Albion in 1999, making his debut for his hometown team on his 40th birthday. He is believed to be the first 50-year-old to play professional rugby, turning out for Plymouth Albion in the Championship and British & Irish Cup. He guided Plymouth from the bottom of National League Three South to National League 1 (now known as the Championship). Albion nearly went all the way to the Premiership but narrowly missed out in 2004-05, the same season they reached their first Twickenham final.

On 21 November 2011, Graham was relieved of his duties as Chairman of Rugby at Plymouth Albion due to lack of finance. After leaving Albion, Dawe worked as a coaching consultant and helped out Premiership club Saracens. He was persuaded to return to Plymouth in 2015 when they were sitting bottom of the Championship and having given notice of administration. Dawe totally rebuilt the squad and they won 22 of their 30 games in National One before he left the club following a change of ownership. He helped Devon reach six County Championship finals between 2000 and 2008. He finished coaching Devon in 2010 and in 2014 took over as head coach of Cornwall, helping them to three consecutive finals, winning it in 2015 and 2016, the first time Cornwall had won consecutive titles in their history. In early 2015, Dawe was also asked to do some work with the England squad by new coach Eddie Jones. He has also coached the Barbarians, Royal Navy and University of St Mark and St John.
