= Redruth R.F.C. =

English rugby union club, based in Cornwall

Redruth RFC
- Full name: Redruth Rugby Club
- Union: Cornwall RFU
- Founded: 1875; 151 years ago
- Location: Redruth, Cornwall, England
- Ground: Recreation Ground (Capacity: 3,500 (580 seated))
- Coach(es): Nigel Hambly, Richie Kevern
- Captain: Edward Pascoe
- League: National League 2 West
- 2025–26: 10th
Team kit

Official website
- www.pitchero.com/clubs/redruth

Redruth RFC (established 1875) is a rugby union club from the town of Redruth, Cornwall, currently playing in the fourth tier of the English league system, National League 2 West. The club run a number of men's teams including 1st XV (National League 2 West), 2nd XV (Counties 1 Western West), Ladies XV, Colts and a Select XV as well as a number of junior teams from age 7 through to 16. They are one of the most successful club sides in Cornwall, having won the Cornwall Cup ten times and the Cornwall Super Cup three times. Redruth enjoy a strong rivalry with neighbours Camborne, with the two clubs meeting annually on Boxing Day, in a fixture that dates back to 1928.

== History ==
Redruth RFC was founded in 1875 by Henry Grylls and W H Willimot both of whom had returned to Cornwall after their education at Clifton College and Marlborough respectively. The club quickly established itself as one of the most successful in Cornwall, a position they were to hold for much of the 20th century. They began life playing on the Brewery Field at Redruth but, in 1883 they moved to the Recreation Ground at the end of Green Lane. They have remained there ever since. When the leagues started in 1987, Redruth was in the provincial league of South-West 1, which they won. The team then won the old League Four South in 1991 and gained promotion. In 2005, the club reached its highest-ever ranking by winning promotion into National Division One. The team finished in 4th position in the 2006–07 season.

== Current standings ==
2026–27 National League 2 West table
Pos	Team	Pld	W	D	L	PF	PA	PD	TB	LB	Pts	Qualification
1	Redruth	6	6	0	0	265	121	+144	5	0	29	Promotion place
2	Taunton Titans	6	5	0	1	264	132	+132	5	1	26	Promotion play-off
3	Hinckley	6	5	0	1	253	108	+145	5	0	25	
4	Luctonians	6	5	0	1	198	129	+69	5	0	25	
5	Clifton	6	5	0	1	240	189	+51	5	0	25	
6	Lymm	6	4	0	2	198	202	−4	5	1	22	
7	Old Redcliffians	6	3	0	3	194	188	+6	5	1	18	
8	Cinderford	6	3	0	3	222	250	−28	5	0	17	
9	Loughborough Students	6	2	0	4	197	236	−39	5	1	14	
10	Hornets	6	1	0	5	180	200	−20	4	4	12	
11	Barnstaple	6	2	0	4	139	174	−35	2	1	11	
12	Bournville	6	1	0	5	212	348	−136	5	1	10	Relegation play-off
13	Devonport Services	6	0	0	6	145	294	−149	3	1	4	Relegation place
14	Exeter University	6	0	0	6	140	276	−136	2	0	2	Relegation place

Updated to match(es) played on 5 September 2026. Source: National League Rugby
Rules for classification: If teams are level at any stage, tiebreakers are applied in the following order:
1. Number of matches won
2. Number of matches drawn
3. Difference between points for and against
4. Total number of points for
5. Aggregate number of points scored in matches between tied teams
6. Number of matches won excluding the first match, then the second and so on until the tie is settled

== Ground ==
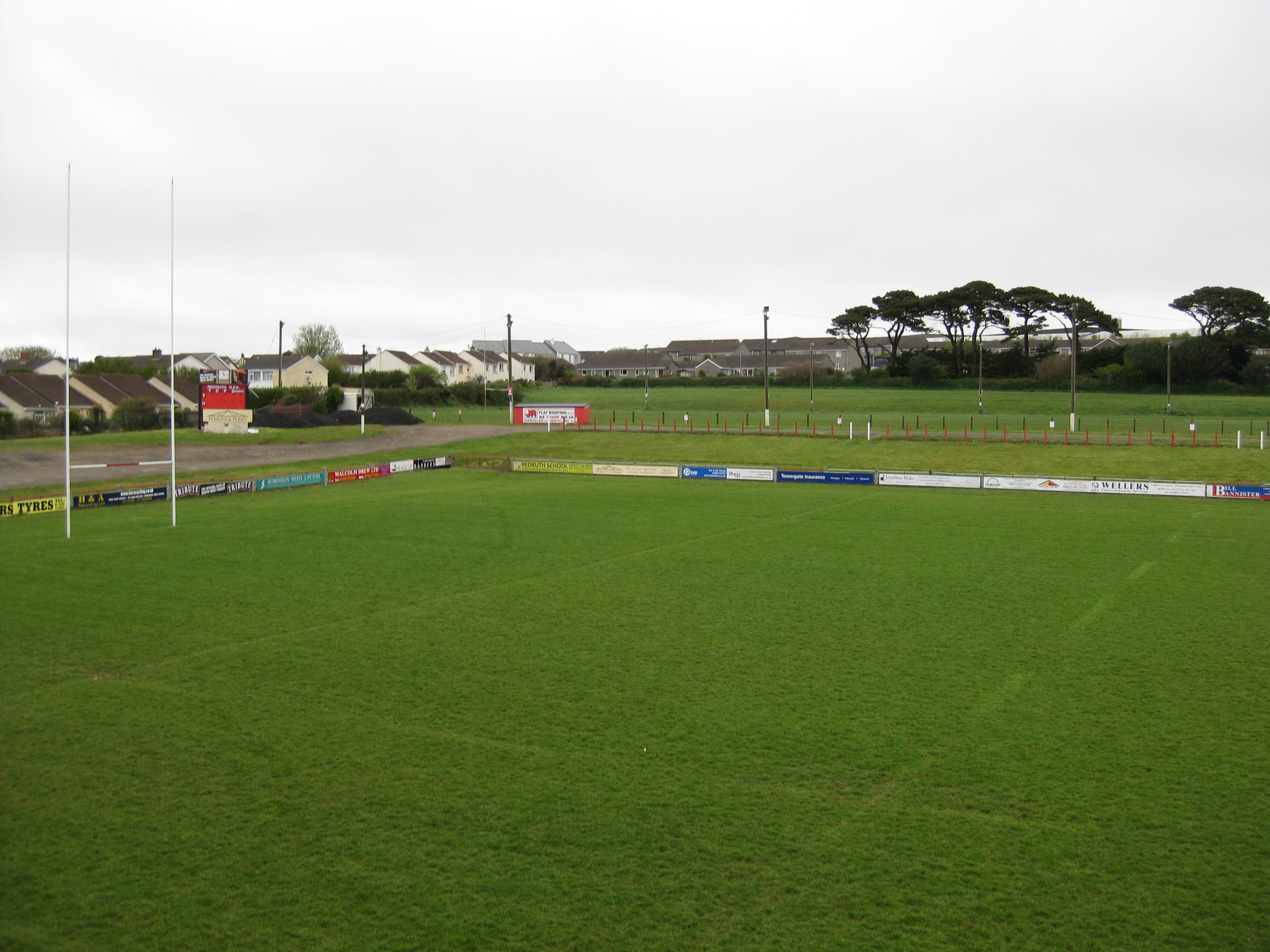
View of the main bank from the grandstand, with training pitch seen behind

The Recreation Ground is situated on Cardrew Lane in Redruth, around five minutes walk from the town centre and Redruth railway station. The ground consists of a main pitch with a wooden grandstand alongside the clubhouse on the west side, and terraced grass banking on the other three sides. The ground also has several bars adjoining the grandstand, and there is also a secondary pitch for 2nd XV and junior fixtures. There is parking for around 100 cars but this is often limited on match-days and it is recommended that supporters park nearby in town.

The capacity of the Recreation Ground has varied over the decades. Up until the 1980s it was considered the third largest rugby ground in England (behind Twickenham and Leicester Tigers home of Welford Road) with an official capacity of 21,172, which included a number of temporary stands. This capacity was actually exceeded in 1969 when the ground hosted the final of the County Championship between Cornwall and Lancashire, when 25,000 are believed to have watched the game.

The removal of the temporary stands and increased safety standards saw the ground's capacity reduce to 12,000 in the 1990s to around 3,500 as of 2018. This figure includes 580 seated in the grandstand, with standing room of approximately 1,500 on the east bank, 800 on the north bank, 400 on the south bank and a further 200 or so in front of the grandstand. In 2018 the local police gave an estimate of 3,000 but since Redruth were reported to have achieved an attendance of 4,000 for a National 2 promotion playoff game as recently as 2005, this is a little conservative.

=== Support ===
As one of the traditional rugby powerhouses in Cornwall, Redruth topped attendance charts in National League 2 South after entering the division during the 2011–12 season. The reported crowd of 4,000 that attended Redruth's playoff victory against Macclesfield remains the club's best crowd for a competitive fixture in recent times. The club also draws large crowds in excess of 1,000 for the traditional yearly fixture against neighbours Camborne.

The table below is a summary of the club's league attendance since the 2000–01 season. The club received its highest attendance during the 2008–09 season in the former National Division Two, in part due to crowds in excess of 2,000 during derby games against Launceston and Mounts Bay.

Season	Total	Average	Highest
2000–01	10,150	781	2,000
2001–02 (Note: Redruth are missing 2 home attendances out of 13 due to poor media coverage during the 2001–02 season.)	9,170	834	2,000
2002–03 (Note: Redruth are missing 8 home attendances out of 13 due to extremely poor media coverage during the 2002–03 season.)	2,850	570	650
2003–04 (Note: Redruth are missing 13 home attendances out of 13 due to extremely poor media coverage during the 2003–04 season.)	0	0	0
2004–05 (Note: Redruth are missing 2 home attendances out of 13 due to poor media coverage during the 2004–05 season.)	9,916	901	1,500
2005–06	11,283	868	1,759
2006–07	11,012	847	1,507
2007–08	10,249	788	968
2008–09	15,212	1,170	2,218
2009–10	13,974	932	2,010
2010–11	13,996	933	1,627
2011–12	12,622	841	1,258
2012–13	11,376	813	1,140
2013–14	10,799	720	1,350
2014–15	11,707	780	1,320
2015–16	11,937	796	1,120
2016–17	11,280	752	870
2017–18	11,615	774	920
2018–19	9,110	607	810
2019–20 (Note: Redruth only played 13 home games (out of 15) during the 2019–20 season due to the COVID-19 pandemic in the United Kingdom.)	8,789	676	920
2020–21 (Note: 2020–21 season cancelled due to COVID-19 pandemic in the United Kingdom.)	0	0	0
2021–22	11,621	775	1,075
2022–23	9,348	719	869
2023–24	11,084	853	2,850
2024–25	11,038	849	2,478
2025–26	10,451	804	2,548

== Season summary ==
Below is a summary of Redruth's performances in competitive rugby since the advent of the leagues in 1987–88.

Season	League			National Cup(s)		County Cup(s)	
Season	Competition/Level	Position	Points	Competition	Performance	Competition	Performance
1987–88	South West 1 (5)	1st (promoted)		John Player Cup	2nd Round	Cornwall Cup	Winners
1988–89	Area League South (4)	4th	13	Pilkington Cup	2nd Round	Cornwall Cup	Winners
1989–90	Area League South (4)	3rd	14	Pilkington Cup	2nd Round	Cornwall Cup	Runners up
1990–91	National 4 South (4) (Note: RFU league restructuring for the 1990–91 meant that Area League South was renamed National 4 South.)	1st (promoted)	24			Cornwall Cup	Winners
1991–92	National 3 (3)	5th	13	Pilkington Cup	1st Round		
1992–93	National 3 (3)	4th	16	Pilkington Cup	4th Round	Cornwall Cup	Winners
1993–94	National 3 (3)	10th (relegated)	4	Pilkington Cup	2nd Round	Cornwall Cup	Runners up
1994–95	National 4 (4)	7th	14	Pilkington Cup	3rd Round	Cornwall Cup	Winners
1995–96	National 4 (4)	7th (promoted) (Note: RFU league restructuring for the 1995–96 season would see National 4 abolished and meant that the top eight teams in that division (including Redruth) were promoted into National 3.)	14	Pilkington Cup	3rd Round	Cornwall Cup	Runners up
1996–97	National 3 (3)	15th (relegated)	16	Pilkington Cup	3rd Round		
1997–98	National 2 South (4) (Note: RFU league restructuring for the 1997–98 season saw National 4 South be renamed as National 2 South.)	9th	20	Tetley's Bitter Cup	1st Round	Cornwall Cup	Runners up
1998–99	National 2 South (4)	11th	17	Tetley's Bitter Cup	1st Round		
1999–2000	National 2 South (4)	5th	32	Tetley's Bitter Cup	3rd Round		
2000–01	National 3 South (4) (Note: RFU league restructuring for the 2000–01 season saw National 2 South be renamed as National 3 South.)	5th	29	Tetley's Bitter Cup	2nd Round	Cornwall Cup	Semi-finals
2001–02	National 3 South (4)	8th	24	Powergen Cup	1st Round	Cornwall Cup	Quarter-finals
2002–03	National 3 South (4)	7th	25	Powergen Cup	2nd Round	Cornwall Cup	Winners
2003–04	National 3 South (4)	4th	32	Powergen Cup	3rd Round	Cornwall Cup	Winners
2004–05	National 3 South (4)	2nd (promoted via play-off)	104 (Note: The 2004–05 season would see the introduction of bonus points into National League English rugby union.)	Powergen Cup	3rd Round	Cornwall Cup	Semi-finals
2005–06	National 2 (3)	10th	51	Powergen Trophy	6th Round	Cornwall Cup	Runners up
2006–07	National 2 (3)	4th	92	EDF Energy Cup	4th Round	Cornwall Cup	Winners
2007–08	National 2 (3)	9th	58	EDF Energy Trophy	4th Round	Cornwall Super Cup	3rd
2008–09	National 2 (3)	3rd	94	EDF Energy Trophy	3rd Round		
2009–10	National 1 (3) (Note: RFU league restructuring for the 2009-10 season meant that National 2 was renamed to National 1.)	11th	69			Cornwall Super Cup	Winners
2010–11	National 1 (3)	14th (relegated)	62				
2011–12	National 2 South (4)	6th	81				
2012–13	National 2 South (4)	4th	94				
2013–14	National 2 South (4)	9th	72			Cornwall Super Cup	Runners up
2014–15	National 2 South (4)	9th	66			Cornwall Super Cup	Winners
2015–16	National 2 South (4)	4th	110			Cornwall Super Cup	Winners
2016–17	National 2 South (4)	5th	101			Cornwall Super Cup	3rd (Note: Redruth withdrew one game into the 2016–17 Cornwall Super Cup due to National League 2 South commitments leaving Camborne and Launceston to compete for the title.)
2017–18	National 2 South (4)	5th	89				
2018–19	National 2 South (4)	7th	69				
2019–20	National 2 South (4)	3rd	114.90 (Note: The season was postponed and ultimately cancelled due to the COVID-19 pandemic in the United Kingdom with Redruth sitting in 3rd, having played 25 games and gained 96 points. The remaining games were calculated on a 'best playing record formula', with Redruth remaining in 3rd place with 114.90 points.)				
2020–21	National 2 South (4)	Cancelled due to the coronavirus pandemic					
2021–22	National 2 South (4)	2nd	119				
2022–23	National 2 West (4)	7th	75				
2023–24	National 2 West (4)	9th	66				
2024–25	National 2 West (4)	8th	77				
2025–26	National 2 West (4)	10th	66				
Green background stands for either league champions (with promotion) or cup winners. Blue background stands for promotion without winning league or losing cup finalists. Pink background stands for relegation.

== Playing record ==
First team

Season	P	W	D	L	F	A	Ref
1899–1900	29	15	8	6	281	115	

Reserve team

Season	P	W	D	L	F	A	Ref
1899–1900	24	19	5	0	414	32	

== Honours ==
- Cornwall Cup winners (10): 1979–80, 1983–84, 1987–88, 1988–89, 1990–91, 1992–93, 1994–95, 2002–03, 2003–04, 2006–07
- South West 1 champions: 1987–88
- National League Division 4 South champions: 1990–91
- National Division Three (north v south) promotion play-off winner: 2004–05
- Cornwall Super Cup winners (3): 2009–10, 2014–15, 2015–16
- Rodda's Cup winners (13): 2010 (1), 2011 (1), 2012 (2), 2013 (1), 2014 (2), 2015 (2), 2016 (2), 2017 (2) (Note: Note that the Rodda's Cup fixture between Redruth and Camborne is contested twice a season on a home and away basis, once on Boxing Day and then again in either March or April. Also note that as the cup was first competed for on the Boxing Day of 2010.)

== Colts ==
The colts section is coached by David Wills and Jason Pengilly. The team has consistently finished highly in the national Colts competition, and won the U-17s cup and U-18s Cornwall Cup competitions in 2009.

== Representative honours ==
=== British & Irish Lions ===
- James (Maffer) Davey 1908
- Roy Jennings 1930
- Richard Sharp 1962
- Phil Vickery 2001 & 2009

Great Britain (1908 Olympics)

- Bert Solomon
- James (Maffer) Davey
- Arthur Lawry

=== England ===
- William Mitchell Grylls 1905
- James (Maffer) Davey 1908–1909
- Bert Solomon 1910
- Edward Scott 1947–1948
- Richard Sharp 1960–1967
- Phil Vickery1998–-2010

=== Barbarians ===
- Harry Faviell 1935 v East Midlands
- Edward Scott1944 v Thornloe. 1945 v Leicester Tigers
- Les Semmens 1948 v Newport. v Cardiff.
- Harold Stevens 1960 v East Midlands
- Richard Sharp Six appearances 1959-1964
- C. "Bonzo" Johns 1962 v Newport v Cardiff
- Ken Abrahams 1962 v Newport v Cardiff
- Derek Prout Six appearances 1968-69
- Terry Pryor 1968 v Swansea, Penarth, East Midlands
- Richard Keast 1992 v Newport
- Andy Hawken 2002 v Combined Services 2004 v Combined Services
- Darren Jacques 2009 Bedford

=== England B ===
- Terry Pryor 1978 Tour of Romania (captain)

=== England Counties ===
- Darren Jacques
- Luke Collins
- Owen Hambly
- Peter Joyce
- Glenn Cooper
- Lewis Vinnicombe
- Sam Heard

== See also ==
- Rugby in Cornwall
