= Rodda's =

Cornish dairy company

Roddas of Cornwall
- Company type: Dairy company
- Industry: Dairy
- Founded: 1890
- Founder: Eliza Jane Rodda
- Headquarters: Scorrier, Cornwall, England
- Products: Clotted cream, butter, dairy products
- Website: www.roddas.co.uk

Rodda's is a dairy company in Scorrier, Cornwall, United Kingdom, known for clotted cream.

== Legacy ==
As a family-owned business, Roddas of Cornwall continues to be run by the Rodda family, ensuring the preservation of its heritage. Since 2009, the company has awarded the Rodda's Cup to the winners of the Camborne and Redruth bi-annual fixture.

== See also ==
- Cornish cuisine
