= Cornwall Super Cup =

English Rugby Union club competition

Cornish Super Cup
- Sport: Rugby Union
- Instituted: 2007; 19 years ago
- Ceased: 2017; 9 years ago
- Number of teams: 3
- Country: England
- Holders: Camborne (2016–17)
- Most titles: Redruth (2 titles)
- Website: Cornish RFU

The Cornwall Super Cup is an annual English Rugby Union club competition founded in 2007, organized by the Cornwall Rugby Football Union and was last sponsored by Tribute Ales. Previously the competition was competed for by the top three Cornish national league teams (tier 3 and below of the English rugby union league system) - Redruth, Camborne and Launceston. Currently, the competition is competed for by Camborne and Launceston, because they are the top Cornish sides that are in the same division (South West Premier - tier 5), with Redruth one division higher in National League 2 South.

The Cornish Super Cup was originally introduced for the 2007-08 (then sponsored by Skinner's Brewery) as a 6-game round robin competition between three of the county's top sides, including Launceston (National 1), Mounts Bay (National 3 South) and Redruth (National 2), with the notable exception being the Cornish Pirates (National 1). This would mean that these sides would no longer participate in the Cornwall Senior Cup as they had previously. By the end of the season the lowest ranked team in terms of division, Mounts Bay, were the champions having defeated the Launceston at the final held at the Mennaye Field.

For the following season the competition expanded to include the Cornish Pirates. The intention was that all four teams would play each other twice in a group stage – with the top two teams meeting at the final at Tregorrick Park in St Austell. Owing a variety of reasons (mostly fixture congestion) a large number of games were un-played and the CRFU had to cancel the competition. Since this cancellation the cup has been played between the Launceston and Redruth as a two legged final (separate from league games) for 2009-10 before switching to the current system of doubling up as league games after a hiatus of several years. At the moment the Launceston and Redruth are in the same division so playing the cup as part of the league helps avoid the fixture congestion that plagued previous versions although with Launceston's relegation from the 2015–16 National League 2 South the future of the Cornish Super Cup is uncertain.

Despite Launceston's relegation, the Cornish Super Cup would return for the 2015–16 season. This time the cup would feature three Cornish teams - with National League 3 South West newcomers Camborne being added to face Launceston (National League 3 South West) and local rivals Redruth (National League 2 South) - and the format changing to that of a mini league. Following Launceston's second successive relegation the competition has since been discontinued as no teams are in the same division.

After a gap of 2 seasons, the Cornwall Super Cup returned for the 2019–20 season. This time it would be contested by Camborne and Launceston only - with both sides league fixtures against each in South West Premier (tier 5) counting towards the cup.

== Cornwall Super Cup honours ==
Cornwall Super Cup Honours
Season	Champion	Score	Runners–up	Venue	Cup Name/Sponsor
2007–08	Mounts Bay	45–17	Launceston	Mennaye Field, Penzance	Skinner's Brewery Cornwall Super Cup
2008–09	Cancelled (Note: This year's competition had been set up initially with the top four Cornish sides – Cornish Pirates, Launceston, Mounts Bay and Redruth – due to play each other on a home and away basis with the top two going through to the final to be held at St Austell in April. Unfortunately these group fixtures were not fulfilled in time for finalists to be determined and the event was cancelled.)				
2009–10	Redruth	48–29 (Note: The first leg of the final finished 20–16 to Launceston at Polson Bridge while Redruth won the return leg at the Recreation Ground 32–9.)	Launceston	2 legs (Home & Away) (Note: After the cancellation of the previous season as stripped down version of the cup would reappear with the Launceston to play Redruth home and away as part of a two legged final (held in March/April 2010) with the team with the highest aggregate score being determined the winner. Outside of the Cornish Pirates (who were in the Championship), Launceston and Redruth were the highest ranked teams in Cornwall.)	Skinner's Brewery Cornwall Super Cup
2010–11	No competition				
2011–12	No competition				
2012–13	No competition				
2013–14	Launceston	39–28 (Note: First leg at Polson Bridge finished 31–10 to Launceston while the second leg at the Recreation Ground finished 18–10 to Redruth.)	Redruth	2 legs (Home & Away) (Note: The Cornish Super Cup would return with the home and away National 2 South games between the Launceston and Redruth counting towards the cup with the team with the highest aggregate score being declared the winner.)	Tribute Ale Cornwall RFU Super Cup
2014–15	Redruth	29–28 (Note: First leg at Recreation Ground finished 14–13 to Redruth while the second leg at Polson Bridge finished 15–15.)	Launceston	2 legs (Home & Away)	Tribute Ale Cornwall RFU Super Cup
2015–16	Redruth	51–17 (Note: First leg at Recreation Ground finished 17-0 to Redruth while the second leg at Polson Bridge finished 34-17 to Redruth.)	Launceston	2 legs (Home & Away)	Tribute Ale Cornwall RFU Super Cup
2016–17 (Note: For 2016-17 the Super Cup format changed to that of a mini league competed for by the three top National League clubs based in Cornwall - Camborne, Launceston and Redruth.)	Camborne	N/A	Launceston	League Format	Tribute Ale Cornwall RFU Super Cup
2017–18	No competition				
2018-19	No competition				
2019-20				2 legs (Home & Away)	Tribute Ale Cornwall RFU Super Cup

== Number of wins ==
- Redruth (3)
- Camborne (1)
- Launceston (1)
- Mounts Bay (1)

== Cornwall Super Cup fixtures and results ==
=== 2009–10 ===
28 March 2010

Launceston	20 – 16	Redruth
	Report

Polson Bridge
Attendance: 325
Referee: S McConnell

18 April 2010

Redruth	32 – 9	Launceston
	Report

Recreation Ground
Attendance: 368
Referee: Luke Pearce

- Redruth win 48–29 on aggregate.

=== 2013–14 ===
14 September 2013
15:00

(BP) Launceston	31 – 10	Redruth
	Report

Polson Bridge
Attendance: 1,650
Referee: Fergus Kirby

21 December 2013
14:00

Redruth	18 – 10	Launceston
	Report

The Recreation Ground
Attendance: 1,350
Referee: Fergus Kirby

- Launceston win 39-28 on aggregate.

=== 2014–15 ===
13 September 2014
15:00

Redruth	14 – 13	Launceston (BP)
	Report

The Recreation Ground
Attendance: 1,320
Referee: Philip Davis

20 December 2014
14:30

Launceston	15 – 15 (Note: Second leg of 2014-15 Cornish Super Cup. Redruth win 29 - 28 on aggregate.)	Redruth
	Report

Polson Bridge
Attendance: 1,315
Referee: Shane Lewis

- Redruth win 29-28 on aggregate.

=== 2015–16 ===
19 December 2015
14:00

Redruth	17 – 0	Launceston
	Report

The Recreation Ground
Attendance: 1,050
Referee: Anthony Woodthorpe

23 April 2016
15:00

Launceston	17 – 34	Redruth (BP)
	Report

Polson Bridge
Attendance: 882
Referee: Calum Howard

- Redruth win 51-17 on aggregate.

=== 2016–17 ===
The 2016–17 season would see a change in the cup. While before the cup was a two-legged competition played home and away, the addition of an extra team meant that it would be changed to a league format with each side playing each other home and away for a total of six games in all. As Camborne and Launceston were in the same league the two league matches between the sides would double up as Super Cup fixtures along with the traditional Rodda's Cup fixture between Redruth and Camborne. The remaining fixtures between Launceston and Redruth would take place on weekend dates free of league rugby. At the end of the six matches the top two sides were supposed meet in final to be held in May 2017.

Despite beating Camborne in the traditional Boxing Day fixture, Redruth would drop out of the competition, leaving Camborne and Launceston to compete for the cup. This meant that the May final was cancelled and instead the two league fixtures between Camborne and Launceston in National League 3 South West would count towards the Super Cup, with Camborne ultimately winning their first ever Super Cup, defeating Launceston 61-30 on aggregate.

1 October 2016
15:00

(BP) Camborne	50 - 11	Launceston
	Report

Recreation Ground
Attendance: 958
Referee: Richard Timbrell

- National League 3 South West league & Super Cup double header.

26 December 2016

(BP) Redruth	54 - 7	Camborne
	Report

The Recreation Ground
Attendance: 1,910
Referee: Zerran Bell

- Rodda's Milk Cup & Super Cup double header. Result would not count in the Super Cup after Redruth's later withdrawal from the competition.

31 December 2016

Launceston	C - C	Redruth

Polson Bridge

- Cancelled by mutual agreement as neither team could guarantee a side.

21 January 2017
14:30

Launceston	19 - 11	Camborne
	Report

Polson Bridge
Attendance: 669
Referee: Nick Williams

- National League 3 South West league & Super Cup double header.

18 March 2017

Redruth	C - C	Launceston

The Recreation Ground

- Game cancelled as Redruth would withdraw from the competition due to National League 2 South league commitments.

15 April 2017

Camborne	C - C	Redruth

Recreation Ground

- Game cancelled.

==== 2016–17 final table ====
	Club	Played	Won	Drawn	Lost	Points for	Points against	Points diff	Try bonus	Losing bonus	Points
1	Camborne (N3SW) (C)	2	1	0	1	61	30	31	1	0	5
2	Launceston (N3SW)	2	0	1	1	30	61	-31	0	0	4
3	Redruth (N2S)	0	0	0	0	0	0	0	0	0	N/A (Note: Despite beating Camborne in the Boxing Day fixture, Redruth withdrew from the competition due to National League 2 South commitments leaving Camborne and Launceston to compete for the title Redruth's results in the competition up to this point was declared void.)
If teams are level at any stage, tiebreakers are applied in the following order: 1. Number of matches won 2. Difference between points for and against 3. Total number of points for 4. Aggregate number of points scored in matches between tied teams 5. Number of matches won excluding the first match, then the second and so on until the tie is settled
Green background is 2016-17 Cornish Super Cup Champions. Updated: 26 October 2016

=== 2019–20 ===
7 December 2019
14:30

Camborne	27 – 20	Launceston
	Report

Recreation Ground
Attendance: 600
Referee: Tom Evans Jones

28 March 2019
15:00

Camborne	v	Launceston

Polson Bridge

== See also ==
- Cornwall RFU
- Cornwall Cup
- Cornwall Clubs Cup
- English rugby union system
- Rugby union in England
