= Derek Prout =

England international rugby union player (1942 - 2005)

- Full name: Derek Henry Prout
- Born: 10 November 1942 Launceston, Cornwall, England
- Died: 27 July 2005 (aged 62) Southampton, Hampshire, England

Rugby union career
- Position: Wing
International career
Years	Team	Apps	(Points)
1968	England	2	(0)

Derek Henry Prout (10 November 1942 - 27 July 2005) was an English rugby union international.

A winger from Launceston, Cornwall, Prout featured in 41 county matches for county. He played rugby for Loughborough Colleges during his tertiary studies in the early 1960s, before joining Northampton in 1967.

Prout was capped twice by England in the 1968 Five Nations, for matches against Wales and Ireland at Twickenham, both of which ended in a draw. He shared his Test debut with future England captain Bob Hiller.

Following his England caps, Prout continued at Northampton until 1971, then had a short stint with Harlequins.

Prout, a teacher by profession, coached Trojans and Hampshire.

== See also ==
- List of England national rugby union players
