= CRFU Cornwall Cup =

English rugby union club competition

- Sport: Rugby Union
- Instituted: 1896; 129 years ago
- Number of teams: 13
- Country: England
- Holders: Wadebridge Camels (4th title) (2018–19)
- Most titles: Redruth, Camborne (10 titles)
- Website: Cornwall RFU

The CRFU Cornwall Cup (currently sponsored by Tribute Ales) is an annual rugby union knock-out cup club competition organised by the Cornwall Rugby Football Union first played for in 1896 but only regularly since 1969. It is open for teams based in Cornwall that are ranked below the national leagues (tier 6–8) but above the Cornish regional divisions (tier 9–10). Tier 9 to 10 clubs have their own competition in the Cornish Clubs Cup.

Until 2006–07 all of the top rugby union teams in Cornwall including the Cornish Pirates, Launceston and Redruth played in the competition, up until the formation of the Cornwall Super Cup in 2007–08. Although the Cornwall Super Cup is now a two-legged competition between only two sides, the national Cornish clubs have kept away from the CRFU Cornwall Cup as the demands of the modern game have increased over the years.

The current format is as a knock-out cup with a 1st round, quarter-final, semi-final, and a final, which is held at a neutral venue in April. Due to the odd numbers of teams involved, several teams receive byes during the early stages.

== CRFU Cornwall Cup ==
CRFU Cornwall Cup Honours
Season	Champion	Score	Runner–up	Venue	Cup Name/Sponsor
1896–97	Penzance		School of Mines		Cornwall Rugby Cup
1897–98	Penzance				Cornwall Rugby Cup
1898–1968	No competition for 71 years				
1967–68	Penryn	5–0	Redruth	Recreation Ground, Falmouth	Cornwall Senior Knockout Cup
1968–69	St Ives	6–3	Penryn		Cornwall Senior Knockout Cup
1969–70	St Ives / Penryn	8–8 (Note: Final ended in a draw so both teams would share the cup.)			Cornwall Senior Knockout Cup
1970–71	St Ives	18–3	Redruth		Cornwall Senior Knockout Cup
1971–72	Penryn	11–7	St Ives		Cornwall Senior Knockout Cup
1972–73	Penryn	21–0	St Ives		Cornwall Senior Knockout Cup
1973–74	Falmouth	13–6	St Ives		Cornwall Senior Knockout Cup
1974–75	Penryn	11–0	Penzance/Newlyn	Recreation Ground, Camborne	Cornwall Senior Knockout Cup
1975–76	Penzance/Newlyn	4–3	Redruth	Recreation Ground, Camborne	Cornwall Senior Knockout Cup
1976–77	Falmouth	20–9	Hayle		Cornwall Senior Knockout Cup
1977–78	Camborne	7–6	St Austell	Recreation Ground, Redruth	Cornwall Senior Knockout Cup
1978–79	St Ives	22–6	Camborne		Cornwall Senior Knockout Cup
1979–80	Redruth	29–0	Penryn	Recreation Ground, Falmouth	Cornwall Senior Knockout Cup
1980–81	St Ives	9–6	Camborne		Cornwall Senior Knockout Cup
1981–82	St Ives	22–18	Camborne		Cornwall Senior Knockout Cup
1982–83	Launceston	9–7	Camborne	Recreation Ground, Redruth	Cornwall Senior Knockout Cup
1983–84	Redruth	27–12	Hayle		Cornwall Senior Knockout Cup
1984–85	Camborne	13–12	St Ives		Cornwall Senior Knockout Cup
1985–86	St Ives	4–0	Camborne		Cornwall Senior Knockout Cup
1986–87	Camborne	18–3	Redruth		Cornwall Senior Knockout Cup
1987–88	Redruth	9–7	Launceston		Cornwall Senior Knockout Cup
1988–89	Redruth	12–3	Camborne		Cornwall Senior Knockout Cup
1989–90	Camborne	4–0	Redruth		Bass CRFU Cup
1990–91	Redruth	6–4	Camborne		Bass CRFU Cup
1991–92	Camborne	7–6	Launceston		Bass CRFU Cup
1992–93	Redruth	28–6	St Ives		Bass CRFU Cup
1993–94	Launceston	24–14	Redruth		Bass CRFU Cup
1994–95	Redruth	26–20	Launceston		Bass CRFU Cup
1995–96	Launceston	22–13	Redruth		Bass CRFU Cup
1996–97	Launceston	52–12	St Ives		Bass CRFU Cup
1997–98	Launceston	18–16	Redruth		Worthington Draught Bitter CRFU Cup
1998–99	Penzance/Newlyn	34–16	Launceston		Worthington Draught Bitter CRFU Cup
1999–00	Penzance/Newlyn	30–27	Launceston		Worthington Draught Bitter CRFU Cup
2000–01	Launceston	Walkover (Note: Concerns over foot and mouth affected the competition at the semi-final and final stages. Launceston would ultimately be named as victors by walkover.)	N/A	Recreation Ground, Redruth	Worthington Draught Bitter CRFU Cup
2001–02	Truro	27–20	Penryn	Recreation Ground, Redruth	Skinner's Brewery Cornwall Cup
2002–03	Redruth	39–20	Launceston	Recreation Ground, Camborne	Skinner's Brewery Cornwall Cup
2003–04	Redruth	22–0	Truro	Recreation Ground, Camborne	Skinner's Brewery Cornwall Cup
2004–05	Launceston	49–28	Penryn	Recreation Ground, Camborne	Skinner's Brewery Cornwall Cup
2005–06	Launceston	15–10	Redruth	Recreation Ground, Camborne	Skinner's Brewery Cornwall Cup
2006–07	Redruth	43–7	Mounts Bay	Recreation Ground, Camborne	Skinner's Brewery Cornwall Cup (Note: Due to the creation of the Cornwall Super Cup this was the last season in which the higher profile Cornish sides such as Cornish Pirates, Launceston, Mounts Bay and Redruth would take part in the CRFU Cornish Cup.)
2007–08	Wadebridge Camels	15–5	Bude	Tregorrick Park, St Austell	Skinner's Brewery Cornwall Cup
2008–09	St Ives	10–3	Camborne	Tregorrick Park, St Austell	Skinner's Brewery Cornwall Cup
2009–10	Wadebridge Camels	21–16	St Ives	Recreation Ground, Camborne	Skinner's Brewery Cornwall Cup
2010–11	Camborne	16–13	Wadebridge Camels	Recreation Ground, Redruth	Tribute Cornwall Cup
2011–12	Wadebridge Camels	20–17	St Austell	The Memorial Ground, Penryn	Tribute Cornwall Cup
2012–13	Camborne	22–0	Wadebridge Camels	The Memorial Ground, Penryn	Tribute Cornwall Cup
2013–14	Camborne	24–10	St Austell	Recreation Ground, Redruth	Tribute Cornwall Cup
2014–15	Camborne	23–13 (aet)	St Austell	St Clements Hill, Truro	Tribute Cornwall Cup
2015–16	Camborne	62–8	Penryn	Tregorrick Park, St Austell	Tribute Cornwall Cup
2016–17	St Austell	35–22	Wadebridge Camels	Recreation Ground, Redruth	Tribute Cornwall Cup
2017–18	St Ives	20–19	Wadebridge Camels	Recreation Ground, Camborne	Tribute Cornwall Cup
2018–19	Wadebridge Camels	30 – 26	St Ives	Recreation Ground, Redruth	Tribute Cornwall Cup

== Number of wins ==
- Redruth (10)
- Camborne (10)
- St Ives (9) (Note: St Ives wins includes 1 shared title.)
- Launceston (8)
- Penryn (5) (Note: Penryn's wins includes 1 shared title.)
- Wadebridge Camels (4)
- Penzance/Newlyn (3)
- Falmouth (2)
- Penzance (2) (Note: Parent club of Penzance & Newlyn (now Cornish Pirates).)
- St Austell (1)
- Truro (1)

== 1896–97 ==
1896–97 Cornwall Rugby Championship
Pos	Team	P	W	D	L	Goals for	Tries for	Goals against	Tries against	Pts	Notes
1	Penzance	8	6	0	2	6	9	4	3	12	
2	School of Mines	8	5	0	3	3	5	2	1	10	(Note: Penryn failed to play the return game with School of Mines who were awarded 2 points)
3	Redruth	8	3	2	3	8	5	4	2	8	
4	Falmouth	8	3	2	3	4	7	2	8	8	
5	Penryn	8	1	0	7	1	3	10	17	2	
Points are awarded as follows: 2 points for a win; 1 points for a draw; 0 points for a loss

== 1897–98 ==
1897–98 Cornish Senior League
Pos	Team	P	W	D	L	Goals for	Tries for	Goals against	Tries against	Pts	Notes
1	Penzance	10	10	0	0	x	x	3	4	20	(Note: x – unclear in reference)
2	Redruth	10	5	0	5	14	10	5	6	10	
3	Falmouth	9	5	0	4	7	12	3	10	10	
4	School of Mines	9	3	0	6	7	4	6	6	6	
5	Camborne	9	3	0	6	8	7	8	11	6	
6	Penryn	8	2	0	6	2	5	16	10	4	
Points are awarded as follows: 2 points for a win; 1 points for a draw; 0 points for a loss

== 1898–99 ==
1898–99 Cornish Senior Rugby Table
Pos	Team	Played	Won	Draw	Lost	Points for	Points against	Pts	Notes
1	Penzance	8	5	1	2	35	15	16	(Note: Penryn refused to play Penzance on 14 January and the points were awarded to Penzance.)
2	Falmouth	7	5	0	2	50	2x	10	(Note: x – unclear in reference)
3	Redruth	6	5	0	1	68	6	11	
4	Camborne	8	1	2	5	12	86	4	
5	Penryn	6	0	1	5	17	35	1	
Points are awarded as follows: 2 points for a win; 1 points for a draw; 0 points for a loss

== See also ==
- Cornwall RFU
- Cornwall Clubs Cup
- Cornwall Super Cup
- English rugby union system
- Rugby union in England
