= EDF Energy Trophy =

The EDF National Trophy was a cup competition which ran from 2006 to 2009 for the 118 clubs of the Rugby Football Union from National Division One and below. Previously these teams had played in the Powergen Cup, but were excluded from that cup under a new format adopted for the 2005–06 season. The Trophy was replaced by the British and Irish Cup from the 2009–10 season.

The EDF National Trophy retained the knock-out structure of the old Powergen Cup.

In addition to gate receipts, prize money was awarded on an elimination basis. Teams who exited the competition in the third round were reported to have earned £5,500, teams eliminated in the fourth round were paid £6,600 for their participation.

== Winners ==
Powergen Shield

2002 – Rotherham Titans 35–26 Exeter Chiefs
2003 – Orrell 26–20 Exeter Chiefs
2004 – Bristol Shoguns 53–24 Waterloo
2005 – Bedford Blues 14–13 Plymouth Albion

EDF Energy Trophy

2006 – NEC Harlequins 39–23 Bedford Blues
2007 – Cornish Pirates 19–16 Exeter Chiefs
2008 – Northampton Saints 24–13 Exeter Chiefs
2009 – Moseley 23–18 Leeds Carnegie

== See also ==
- Anglo-Welsh Cup
- National Division One
- National Division Two
