= St Austell RFC =

Rugby union club, based in Cornwall

- Full name: St Austell Rugby Football Club
- Union: Cornwall RFU
- Nickname: The Saints
- Founded: 1963; 63 years ago
- Location: St Austell, Cornwall, England
- Ground: Tregorrick Park (Capacity: 4,000 (300 seats))
- Chairman: Joel Double
- President: Roger French
- Coach: Andy Ashwin
- League: Regional 1 South West
- 2025–26: 5th
Team kit

Official website
- www.pitchero.com/clubs/staustell

St Austell RFC is a Cornish rugby union club based in the town of St Austell and was founded in 1963. The club run three senior men's teams as well as ladies side, a colts and multiple junior/mini sides. The club's kit is red and white hoops and the first team currently play in Regional 1 South West with home games at Tregorrick Park.

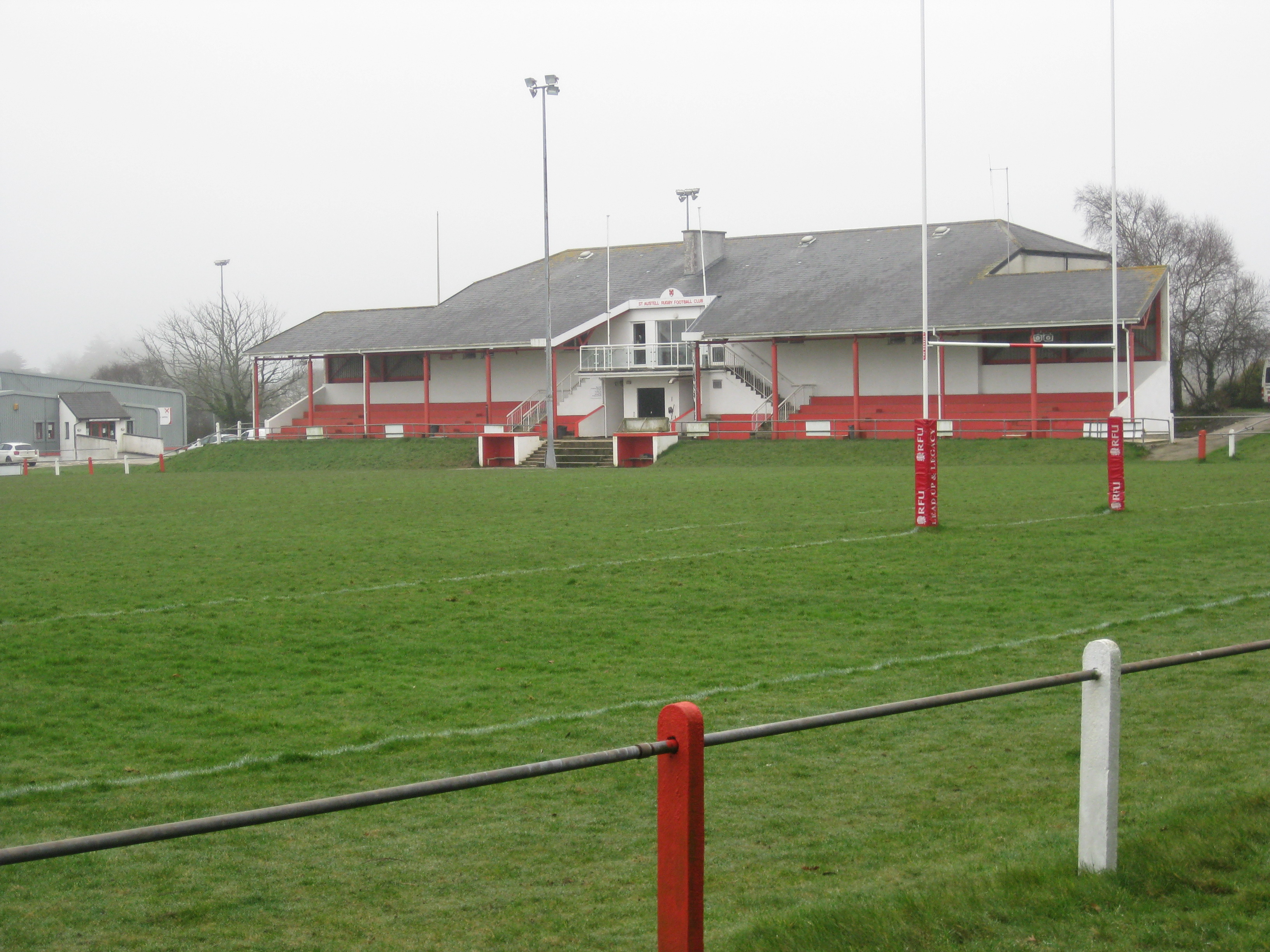
Tregorrick Park, home of St Austell RFC

== History ==
=== Early history ===
St Austell RFC was formed on 31 July 1963 by Wilf Vernalls and Des Robins, with home games being played at Cyprus Avenue in Par Moor. There had been a previous rugby club in St Austell called the Hornets which formed in 1933, but during the 1954–55 season the club relocated to Newquay, becoming known as the Newquay Hornets. The club moved to Circus Field at Cromwell Road in 1967 but would have to wait until the mid-1970s until it joined the Cornish senior circuit, defeating established clubs Truro and St Ives in 1976. In 1978 the club reached the final of the Cornwall Cup for the first time, losing 7–6 to Camborne at the Recreation Ground in Redruth. In 1986, St Austell sold their Circus Field ground to Asda spending several seasons without a ground until they moved into their current ground, Tregorrick Park, in 1988.

=== League rugby ===
With the creation of the Courage national leagues in 1987, St Austell were placed in Courage Cornwall/Devon (division 8 of the league system). They had a poor debut season in the new league, finishing second bottom in 10th place and were relegated to Courage Cornwall League 1. In 1991 St Austell reached the final of the Cornwall Clubs Cup (the secondary cup in Cornwall at the time) but ended up as losing finalists after a 13–0 defeat to Helston. After seven seasons in Cornwall League 1 the club finally achieved promotion in 1995 as they claimed their first league title and returned to Cornwall/Devon. Several years later a second league title and promotion was achieved as St Austell won Western Counties West to reach South West 2 West – which at tier 5 is the highest level the club has reached.

The 2000–01 season ended in disappointment for St Austell, as although they were competitive in the division, they were unable to stay up, going down in 10th place just two points behind relegation rivals Ivybridge. This relegation would see the club fall through the league system as they suffered two more relegations, first from Western Counties West and then from Cornwall/Devon. St Austell stabilized itself during the 2004–05 season when it bounced back with a league and cup double – winning promotion from Cornwall League 1 as champions and then winning the Cornwall Clubs Cup for the first time in the club's history, defeating Perranporth 11–9 at the final held at St. Clement's Hill in Truro. Several seasons in Cornwall/Devon ended in relegation in 2007 as the club finished in 10th place after a tough relegation battle, just 2 points off safety. St Austell then had a period of resurgence as it was promoted from Cornwall League 1 after finishing runners up in 2009. Two years later another second-place finish, this time in Cornwall/Devon, saw the club promoted to Western Counties West. In 2012 St Austell reached the final of the Cornwall Cup for the first time in 34 years losing 20–17 to Wadebridge Camels at the Memorial Ground, Penryn.

The 2012–13 season was the most successful season in St Austells history to date. Firstly the club had an excellent run in the RFU Intermediate Cup (a competition for sides based at level 7 of the league system), beating Wimborne at home 14–8 in February to win the South-West section, making the national semi-finals. A 31–19 defeat away to Brighton at the beginning of April ended the club's chance of making the final at Twickenham Stadium but they had some compensation as the claimed the Tribute Western Counties West league title with a 38–5 win over Exeter Saracens in front of a club record attendance of 800 at Tregorrick Park. In 2014 St Austell reached the final of the Cornwall Cup held at the Recreation Ground in Redruth in what was a repeat of the final of 1978, with Camborne once again victorious in a 24–10 win. The following season St Austell were relegated from Tribute South West 1 West as well as experiencing another disappointment in a Cornwall Cup final, losing to nemesis Camborne, 23-13 after extra time at St Clements Hill, Truro.

On 17 April 2017, St Austell won the Cornwall Cup for the first time, in what was their fifth attempt, defeating fellow league side Wadebridge Camels 33–22 at the final held at the Recreation Ground in Redruth in front of a crowd of 850.

== Season summary ==
Season	League			National Cup(s)		County Cup(s)	
Season	Competition/Level	Position	Points	Competition	Performance	Competition	Performance
1987–88	Cornwall/Devon (8)	10th (relegated)	3				
1988–89	Cornwall 1 (9)	2nd					
1989–90	Cornwall 1 (9)						
1990–91	Cornwall 1 (9)					Cornwall Junior Knockout Plate	Runners up
1991–92	Cornwall 1 (9)						
1992–93	Cornwall 1 (9)						
1993–94	Cornwall 1 (9)						
1994–95	Cornwall 1 (8)	1st (promoted)					
1995–96	Cornwall/Devon (8)	2nd (promoted)					
1996–97	Western Counties West (7)	2nd	30				
1997–98	Western Counties West (7)	1st (promoted)	27				
1998–99	South West 2 West (6)	9th	18				
1999–00	South West 2 West (6)	9th	16				
2000–01	South West 2 West (6)	10th (relegated)	14				
2001–02	Western Counties West (7)	12th (relegated)	6				
2002–03	Cornwall/Devon (8)	10th (relegated)	7				
2003–04	Cornwall 1 (9)	3rd	20	Powergen Junior Vase		Cornwall Cup	1st Round
2004–05	Cornwall 1 (9)	1st (promoted)	26			Cornwall Clubs Cup	Winners
2005–06	Cornwall/Devon (8)	4th	30	Powergen Junior Vase			
2006–07	Cornwall/Devon (8)	10th (relegated)	12	EDF Energy Senior Vase	1st Round		
2007–08	Cornwall 1 (9)	4th	20	EDF Energy Junior Vase	6th Round	Cornwall Clubs Cup	Semi-finals
2008–09	Cornwall 1 (9)	2nd (promoted)	24	EDF Energy Junior Vase	Quarter-finals		
2009–10	Cornwall/Devon (8)	3rd	33			Cornwall Cup	2nd Round
2010–11	Cornwall/Devon (8)	2nd (promoted)	109 (Note: The 2010–11 season saw the introduction of bonus points into lower league English rugby union (tier 6 and below).)			Cornwall Cup	1st Round
2011–12	Western Counties West (7)	4th	89			Cornwall Cup	Runners up
2012–13	Western Counties West (7)	1st (promoted)	108	RFU Intermediate Cup	Semi-finals (Note: St Austell won the South West Intermediate Cup on route to the National RFU Intermediate Cup semi-finals.)	Cornwall Cup	Quarter-finals
2013–14	South West 1 West (6)	4th	91			Cornwall Cup	Runners up
2014–15	South West 1 West (6)	13th (relegated)	39			Cornwall Cup	Runners up
2015–16	Western Counties West (7)	8th	58			Cornwall Cup	Quarter-finals
2016–17	Western Counties West (7)	7th	69			Cornwall Cup	Winners
2017–18	Western Counties West (7)	3rd	83	SW Intermediate Cup	Semi-finals (Note: St Austell exited the competition during the South West Counties final, which was equivalent to the semi-finals of the overall South West Intermediate Cup.)	Cornwall Cup	Semi-finals
2018–19	Western Counties West (7)	4th	93			Cornwall Cup	Semi-finals
2019–20	Western Counties West (7)	2nd (promoted)	106.36 (Note: The season was postponed and ultimately cancelled due to the COVID-19 pandemic in the United Kingdom with St Austell sitting in 1st place, having played 22 games and gained 90 points. The remaining games were calculated on a 'best playing record formula', with St Austell dropping to 2nd place with 106.36 points. Despite the play-offs being cancelled St Austell were promoted as the best runner-up, as they had a better league record than Western Counties North runner-up Matson.)			Cornwall Cup	
Green background stands for either league champions (with promotion) or cup winners. Blue background stands for promotion without winning league or losing cup finalists. Pink background stands for relegation.

== Honours ==
- Cornwall League 1 champions (2): 1994–95, 2004–05
- Cornwall Clubs Cup winners: 2005
- Tribute Western Counties West champions (2): 1997–98, 2012–13
- RFU South West Intermediate Cup winners: 2013
- Cornwall Cup winners: 2017
- Regional 2 South West winners: 2022–23

== Notable former players ==
- Matthew Shepherd – Cornish scrum-half/fly-half, played for St Austell during his early career (scoring over 1,000 points) and later played for Plymouth Albion. He has won the county championship with Cornwall as well as being selected for the England Counties XV.

== See also ==
- Cornish rugby
