= List of Cornish Pirates RFC seasons =

Cornish Pirates Rugby Club is a Cornish professional rugby union club playing in the second tier of the English rugby union system, the RFU Championship. The club was formed in 1945 when Penzance RFC and Newlyn RFC amalgamated to form Penzance & Newlyn RFC and is based in Penzance, Cornwall. Twenty days after the end of the Second World War, the first match was played against Guy's Hospital on 22 September 1945. The club was renamed Cornish Pirates in 2005 and apart from one season at Kenwyn, Truro and four at the Recreation Ground, Camborne, they play at the Mennaye Field in Penzance.

The list below details the club's achievements from the first league season when they played at level eight in the Cornwall and Devon League through to last season (2011–12), when they equalled their highest league position and were also losing finalists in the play–off for promotion to the Aviva Premiership. The club have won promotion on six occasions and have been successful twice in national competitions and also won Cornish Cup competitions three times.

Season	League											Notes	National Cup	Cornwall Cup
Season	Division	P	W	D	L	F	A	Pts	Pos	Level		Notes	National Cup	Cornwall Cup
1987–88	Cornwall and Devon League	10	6	1	3	166	111	13	4th	8				QF
1988–89		10	5	0	5	120	147	10	7th					SF
1989–90		10	9	0	1	256	96	18	1st		Promoted			1st R
1990–91	Western Counties	10	2	1	7	105	115	5	9th	7				1st R
1991–92		10	6	0	4	116	96	12	5th					QF
1992–93		12	8	0	4	314	129	16	4th					1st R
1993–94		12	8	0	4	185	124	16	4th					QF
1994–95		12	8	0	4	287	160	16	4th			18 consecutive home wins		SF
1995–96		11	7	0	4	202	150	14	3rd		Promoted	5 clubs promoted due to league reorganisation		QF
1996–97	South West Two (West)	21	18	0	3	636	241	36	1st	6	Promoted		1st round	SF
1997–98	South West One	22	14	1	7	599	361	29	4th	5			SF	SF
1998–99		22	20	0	2	1083	247	40	1st		Promoted		3rd round	Winners
1999–00	National Three South	26	20	1	5	1055	481	41	2nd	4			3rd round	Winners
2000–01		26	18	2	6	823	492	38	3rd					Finalists[1]
2001–02		26	24	1	1	1271	468	49	1st	4	Promoted		2nd round	
2002–03	National League Two	26	22	1	3	849	442	45	1st	3	Promoted		2nd round	
2003–04	National League One	26	8	1	17	474	892	43	10th	2			4th round	
2004–05		26	17	0	9	698	526	85	4th				2nd round	
2005–06		26	19	0	7	694	561	90	3rd		highest position		2nd round	
2006–07		30	20	2	8	812	491	101	4th				Winners	
2007–08		30	20	1	9	800	583	91	5th		3pts deducted[2]			
2008–09		30	16	1	13	744	578	82	7th				2nd round	Winners[3]
2009–10	RFU Championship	22	11	1	10	555	463	56	6th	2		3rd place in group stage	Winners[4]	
2010–11		22	15	1	6	633	337	76	3rd		highest position	lost promotion play–off final	group stage	
2011–12		22	14	3	5	606	464	74	3rd		highest position	lost promotion play–off final	SF	
2012–13		22	10	2	10	435	480	52	6th					
2013–14		23	10	2	11	456	554	51	6th					
2014–15		22	9	0	13	436	464	45	8th					
2015–16		22	8	1	13	530	570	49	9th					
2016–17		20	9	2	9	559	497	55	6th					
2017–18		22	12	0	10	681	577	67	4th					

- [1]Semi-final held and won at beginning of following season; the final against Launceston was not played and the Pirates decided to withdraw from Cornwall RFU competitions for seven seasons.
- [2]three points deducted for scrum replacement irregularity
- [3]New competition, the Cornwall Super Cup
- [4]British and Irish Cup from 2009–10 onwards

== See also ==
- Cornish Pirates
- RFU Championship
