= CRFU Cornwall Clubs Cup =

Rugby union competition

- Sport: Rugby Union
- Instituted: 1897; 129 years ago
- Number of teams: 4 (Clubs Cup only)
- Country: England
- Holders: Newquay Hornets (4th title) (2018–19)
- Most titles: Illogan Park, Helston, Wadebridge Camels (6 titles)
- Website: Cornish RFU

The CRFU Cornwall Clubs Cup (currently sponsored by Tribute Ales) is an annual rugby union knock-out cup club competition organised by the Cornwall Rugby Football Union. First played for in 1897 but only regularly since 1971. It is open to teams based in Cornwall and play in the Cornish regional divisions (tiers 9 and 10 in the English league system). It is the third highest ranked cup competition in the county after the Cornwall Super Cup and Cornwall Cup.

For the 2016–17 season the competition format has changed. There are now four competitions which take place after the Cornwall League 1 and 2 seasons have finished. The competitions are as follows:

- Tribute Clubs Cup – top 4 of Cornwall League 1
- Tribute Clubs Plate – bottom 4 of Cornwall League 2
- Tribute Clubs Vase – top 4 of Cornwall League 2
- Tribute Clubs Shield – bottom 4 of Cornwall League 2

Each competition will have a group stage starting in April, with each team playing each other once and the top 2 sides qualifying for the final at a neutral venue in May. At present all four Cornwall Clubs finals are played at the same venue and on the same date.

== CRFU Cornwall Clubs Cup ==
CRFU Cornwall Clubs Cup Honours
Season	Champion	Score	Runners–up	Venue	Cup Name/Sponsor
1897–98	Newlyn				Cornwall Junior Cup
1898–99	Newlyn				Cornwall Junior Cup
1899–1971	No competition for 72 years				
1971–72	Bude	18 – 16	RNAS Culdrose		Cornwall Junior Knockout Cup
1972–73	Wadebridge Camels	11 – 3	Illogan Park		Cornwall Junior Knockout Cup
1973–74	RNAS Culdrose	11 – 10	Wadebridge Camels		Cornwall Junior Knockout Cup
1974–75	Illogan Park	12 – 9	Liskeard-Looe		Cornwall Junior Knockout Cup
1975–76	Wadebridge Camels	12 – 3	Redruth GSOB		Cornwall Junior Knockout Cup
1976–77	Wadebridge Camels	20 – 3	Saltash		Cornwall Junior Knockout Cup
1977–78	Wadebridge Camels	16 – 0	Saltash		Cornwall Junior Knockout Cup
1978–79	Illogan Park	15 – 3	Bude		Cornwall Junior Knockout Cup
1979–80	Liskeard-Looe	16 – 4	Bodmin		Cornwall Junior Knockout Cup
1980–81	Helston	18 – 8	Bodmin		Cornwall Junior Knockout Cup
1981–82	Saltash	15 – 6	Camborne School of Mines		Cornwall Junior Knockout Cup
1982–83	Illogan Park	12 – 6	Saltash		Cornwall Junior Knockout Cup
1983–84	Bodmin	13 – 3	Illogan Park		Cornwall Junior Knockout Cup
1984–85	Helston	11 – 3	Bude		Cornwall Junior Knockout Cup
1985–86	Helston	11 – 6	St Agnes	Recreation Ground, Redruth	Cornwall Junior Knockout Cup
1986–87	Illogan Park	9 – 6	Bodmin		Cornwall Junior Knockout Cup
1987–88	Helston	22 – 10	Liskeard-Looe		Cornwall Junior Knockout Plate
1988–89	Helston	23 – 12	Liskeard-Looe		Cornwall Junior Knockout Plate
1989–90	Veor	9 – 8	Bude		Cornwall Junior Knockout Plate
1990–91	Helston	13 – 0	St Austell		Cornwall Junior Knockout Plate
1991–92	Falmouth	22 – 3	Bodmin		Cornwall Junior Knockout Plate
1992–93	Wadebridge Camels	17 – 9	Helston		Cornwall Junior Knockout Plate
1993–94	Saltash	16 – 13	Bude		Cornwall Junior Knockout Plate
1994–95	Redruth Albany	41 – 10	St Agnes		Cornwall Junior Knockout Plate
1995–96	Illogan Park	16 – 16 (Note: Illogan Park won the 1995–96 final by 2 tries to 1.)	Helston		Cornwall Junior Knockout Plate
1996–97	Perranporth	19 – 10	Illogan Park		Cornwall Junior Knockout Plate
1997–98	Illogan Park	19 – 0	Roseland		Cornwall Junior Knockout Plate
1998–99	Bodmin	25 – 20	St Agnes		Cornwall Junior Knockout Plate
1999–00	Perranporth	16 – 12	Bodmin		Cornwall Junior Knockout Plate
2000–01	Wadebridge Camels	55 – 10	Mounts Bay		Cornwall Clubs Cup
2001–02	Bude	18 – 10	Perranporth		Skinner's Brewery Cornwall Clubs Cup
2002–03	Falmouth	23 – 14	Mounts Bay	Recreation Ground, Redruth	Skinner's Brewery Cornwall Clubs Cup
2003–04	Liskeard-Looe	29 – 8	Bodmin	St Clements Hill, Truro	Skinner's Brewery Cornwall Clubs Cup
2004–05	St Austell	11 – 9	Perranporth	St Clements Hill, Truro	Skinner's Brewery Cornwall Clubs Cup
2005–06	Newquay Hornets	17–3	Illogan Park	St Clements Hill, Truro	Skinner's Brewery Cornwall Clubs Cup
2006–07	Liskeard-Looe	23 – 3	Roseland	Recreation Ground, Camborne	Skinner's Brewery Cornwall Clubs Cup
2007–08	Newquay Hornets	33 – 8	Saltash	Tregorrick Park, St Austell	Skinner's Brewery Cornwall Clubs Cup
2008–09	Stithians	33 – 15	Bodmin	Tregorrick Park, St Austell	Skinner's Brewery Cornwall Clubs Cup
2009–10	Roseland	23 – 18	Helston	Recreation Ground, Camborne	Skinner's Brewery Cornwall Clubs Cup
2010–11	Pirates Amateurs	7 – 5	Veor	Recreation Ground, Redruth	Skinner's Brewery Cornwall Clubs Cup
2011–12	Saltash	51 – 0	St Just	The Memorial Ground, Penryn	Skinner's Brewery Cornwall Clubs Cup
2012–13	Veor	19 – 7	Stithians	The Memorial Ground, Penryn	Skinner's Brewery Cornwall Clubs Cup
2013–14	Liskeard-Looe	29 – 17	Perranporth	Recreation Ground, Redruth	Skinner's Brewery Cornwall Clubs Cup
2014–15	Veor	10 – 7	Lanner	St Clements Hill, Truro	Skinner's Brewery Cornwall Clubs Cup
2015–16	Lanner	23 – 8	Veor	Tregorrick Park, St Austell	Skinner's Brewery Cornwall Clubs Cup
2016–17	Newquay Hornets	17 – 8	Liskeard-Looe	Clifden Park, Bodmin	Tribute Cornwall Clubs Cup
2017–18	Liskeard-Looe	33 – 12	Newquay Hornets	Clifden Park, Bodmin	Tribute Cornwall Clubs Cup
2018–19	Newquay Hornets	23 – 21	Veor	St Clements Hill, Truro	Tribute Cornwall Clubs Cup

== Cornwall Clubs Plate Finals ==
Cornwall Clubs Plate Finals
Season	Winner	Score	Runners–up	Venue	Name
2016–17	Helston	21 – 19	Roseland	Clifden Park, Bodmin	Tribute Cornwall Clubs Plate
2017–18	St Agnes	28 – 19	Illogan Park	Clifden Park, Bodmin	Tribute Cornwall Clubs Plate
2018–19	St Agnes	55 – 7	Roseland	St Clements Hill, Truro	Tribute Cornwall Clubs Vase

== Cornwall Clubs Vase Finals ==
Cornwall Clubs Vase Finals
Season	Winner	Score	Runners–up	Venue	Name
2016–17	Illogan Park	10 – 3	Stithians	Clifden Park, Bodmin	Tribute Cornwall Clubs Vase
2017–18	Lankelly-Fowey	24 – 20	Stithians	Clifden Park, Bodmin	Tribute Cornwall Clubs Vase
2018–19	Perranporth	24 – 3	St Just	St Clements Hill, Truro	Tribute Cornwall Clubs Vase

== Cornwall Clubs Shield Finals ==
Cornwall Clubs Shield Finals
Season	Winner	Score	Runners–up	Venue	Name
2016– 17	Perranporth	32 – 8	Redruth Albany	Clifden Park, Bodmin	Tribute Cornwall Clubs Shield
2017–18	Perranporth	49 – 12	Redruth Albany	Clifden Park, Bodmin	Tribute Cornwall Clubs Shield
2018–19	Stithians	34 – 19	Redruth Albany	St Clements Hill, Truro	Tribute Cornwall Clubs Shield

== Number of wins ==
=== Cup ===
- Helston (6)
- Illogan Park (6)
- Wadebridge Camels (6)
- Liskeard-Looe (5)
- Newquay Hornets (4)
- Saltash (3)
- Veor (3)
- Bodmin (2)
- Bude (2)
- Falmouth (2)
- Newlyn (2) (Note: Parent club of Penzance/Newlyn (now Cornish Pirates).)
- Perranporth (2)
- Roseland (2)
- Lanner (1)
- Pirates Amateurs (1)
- Redruth Albany (1)
- St Austell (1)
- RNAS Culdrose (1)
- Stithians (1)

=== Plate ===
- St Agnes (2)
- Helston (1)

=== Vase ===
- Illogan Park (1)
- Lankelly-Fowey (1)
- Perranporth (1)

=== Shield ===
- Perranporth (2)
- Stithians (1)

== 1897–98 ==
1897–98 Cornish Junior League
Pos	Team	Played	Won	Draw	Lost	Goals for	Tries for	Goals against	Tries against	Pts	Notes
1	Redruth A	12	8	1	3	13	24	1	9	23	(Note: Redruth protested against an infringement of the rules by Penzance on 25 September 1897. By the casting vote of the chairman of the CRFU the points were taken from Penzance and awarded to Redruth)
2	Penzance A	12	8	2	2	7	13	5	6	21	(Note: Newlyn played an ineligible man on 27 December 1897 and 1 January 1898. Newlyn lost three points and Penzance gained three points)
3	Newlyn	11	5	4	3	2	13	3	9	15	(Note: Hayle failed to play Newlyn on 30 November 1887 and the points were awarded to Newlyn)
4	Tuckingmill	13	5	5	3	3	9	2	8	15
5	Hayle	12	6	1	5	6	7	8	13	15
6	Camborne A	12	3	0	9	3	6	8	17	8
7	Truro	11	2	1	9	2	8	6	9	5
8	Camborne Mining School A	5	0	0	5	0	2	3	14	0	(Note: The students did not complete their fixtures and their opponents were awarded the points)
Points are awarded as follows: 2 points for a win; 1 points for a draw; 0 points for a loss

== 1898–99 ==
1898–99 Cornish Junior Rugby Table
Pos	Team	Played	Won	Draw	Lost	Points for	Points against	Pts	Notes
1	Newlyn	9	7	0	2	72	13	20	(Note: Falmouth played ineligible players and the points were awarded to Newlyn)
2	Penzance A	9	7	1	1	56	21	17
3	Falmouth Juniors	8	5	2	1	54	23	11
4	Redruth Juniors	10	4	2	4	58	45	10
5	Tuckingmill	8	1	2	5	12	33	4
6	Camborne A	10	1	1	8	14	93	3
7	Truro	7	0	2	5	6	55	2	(Note: Truro failed to complete their games and the points were awarded to their opponents)
Points are awarded as follows: 2 points for a win; 1 points for a draw; 0 points for a loss

== 1904–05 ==
1904–05 Cornish Third Class Competition (top four)
Pos	Team	Played	Won	Draw	Lost	Points for	Points against	Pts	Notes
1	Falmouth Fearnots	20	16	3	1			35
2	Lanner	24	11	6	7			28
3	Falmouth Juniors	19	12	3	4			27
4	Redruth Rangers	19	10	2	7			22
Points are awarded as follows: 2 points for a win; 1 points for a draw; 0 points for a loss

== See also ==
- Cornwall RFU
- Cornwall Cup
- Cornwall Super Cup
- English rugby union system
- Rugby union in England
