= Bude RFC =

English rugby union club, based in Cornwall

- Full name: Bude Rugby Football Club
- Union: Cornwall RFU
- Founded: 1966; 59 years ago
- Location: Bude, Cornwall
- Ground(s): Bencoolen Meadow (Capacity: 750)
- Chairman: Paul Cholwill
- President: Julian Morris
- Coach(es): Adam Black
- League(s): Counties 1 Western West
- 2024–25: 10th
Team kit

Official website
- www.buderfc.co.uk

Bude RFC is a Cornish rugby union club based in the town of Bude and was formed in 1966. The club colours are maroon and blue and they have two senior men's teams, a colts side and multiple junior/mini teams. The men's first team play in Counties 1 Western West.

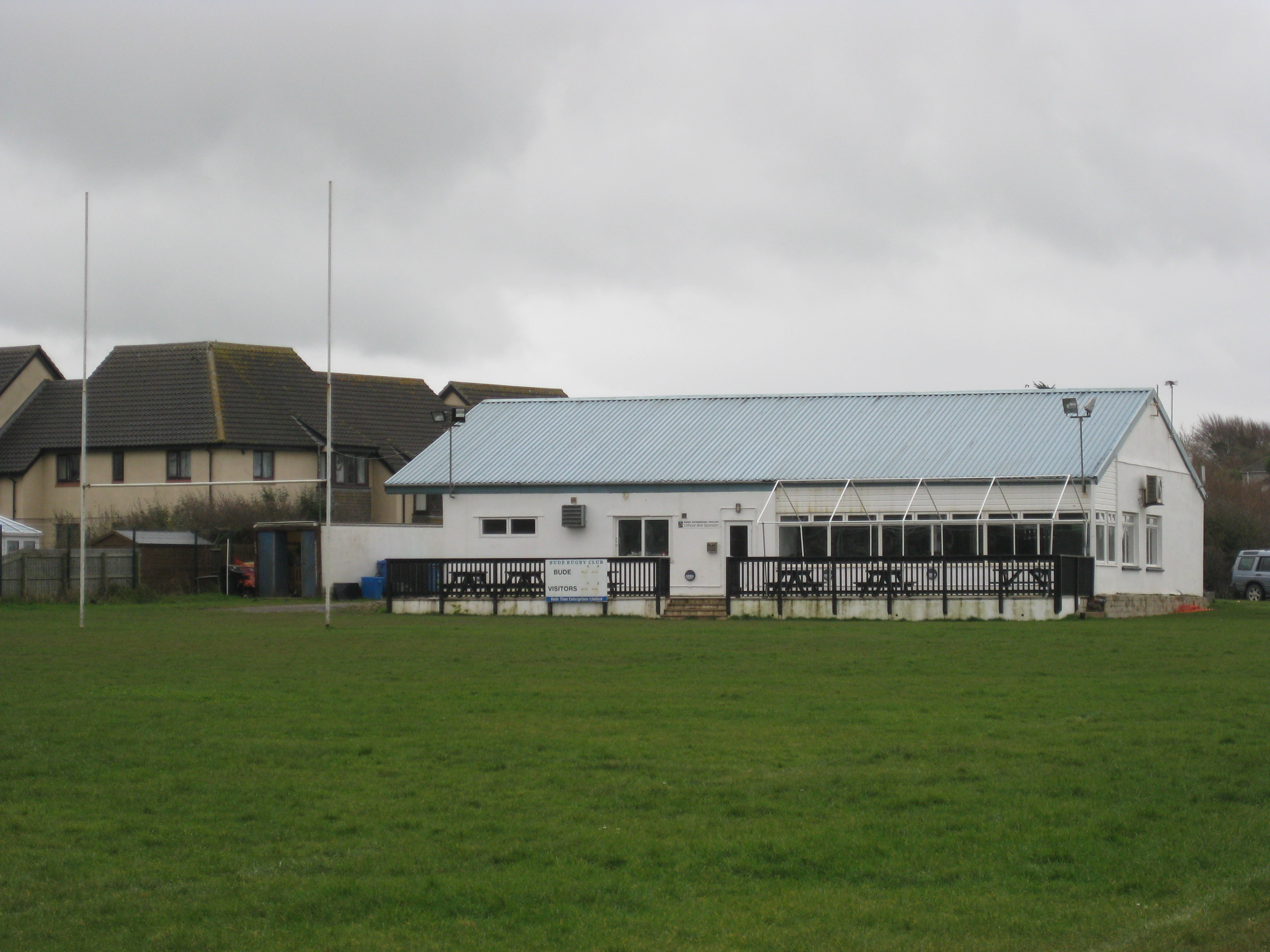
View of clubhouse at Bencoolen Meadow, home of Bude RFC

== History ==
=== Early history ===
Bude RFC was founded in 1966 and had its first game in January of the same year, away to HMS Raleigh, Torpoint. The club initially played home games at the local comprehensive school, but despite moving several times, did not have a permanent ground until 1985, when they moved to their current home of Bencoolen Meadows. During the early days they had some success in county competitions, winning the Cornwall Clubs Cup in 1972 after an 18–16 win over RNAS Culdrose, as well as winning the Cornwall Sevens Junior Plate title in the same year. During the next couple of decades Bude finished as losing finalists in the Cornwall Clubs Cup in 1978 and 1985, as well as winning a second Cornwall Sevens title (this time in the senior section) in 1986.

=== League rugby ===
The advent of the Courage national leagues in 1987 saw Bude placed in Courage Cornwall League 1 (tier 9 of the league system), finishing 6th during their debut season. The club once again reach the Cornwall Clubs Cup final in 1990, losing to Veor 9–8, before gaining promotion from Cornwall League 1 as runner-up at the end of the 1991–92 season. They only lasted one season in Courage Cornwall/Devon after being relegated in 1993, with another losing appearance the following year in the Cornwall Clubs Cup, this time being defeated by Saltash in the final. The last highlight of the 1990s was during the 1995–96 season, when Bude won Cornwall League 1 (their first league title) and were promoted back into Cornwall/Devon. As well as winning the league title the club were also presented with the Alan Barbery Cup – an award handed out by the Cornwall RFU to the Cornish club considered to have had the best league performance that season.

After five seasons in the Cornwall/Devon league Bude were relegated in 2001, falling back into the Cornish regional leagues. Relegation did not last long as the club had one of the most successful seasons of its history to date, winning the league and cup double. First they beat Mounts Bay to the Cornwall League 1 title, and then they beat Perranporth 18–10 to win the Cornwall Clubs Cup for the first time since 1972. A final highlight for the 2001–02 season saw Bude once more presented with the Alan Barbery Cup. Two years later Bude were promoted yet again, this time finishing behind champions, Mounts Bay, to gain promotion and reach the highest level the club have obtained in the English league system so far – Western Counties West (tier 7).

The following seasons would see Bude survive in Western Counties West and in 2008 they would also reach the final of the Cornwall Cup for the first time in the club's history, losing 15–5 to Wadebridge Camels in the game held at Tregorrick Park, St Austell. In 2014 the club were relegated from Tribute Western Counties West in 13th place, after an extremely tight relegation battle which saw them finish just one point behind St Ives, with more wins than their Cornish relegation rivals but less bonus points. The 2015–16 season saw Bude claim their first Tribute Cornwall/Devon title and promotion back into Tribute Western Counties West after an absence of several seasons, winning all but three of their 26 league games as they finished comfortably ahead of runner-up St. Ives.

== Ground ==
Bencoolen Meadow is on the banks of the River Neet just off Kings Hill road in the southern part of the town. The ground consists of a main pitch and club-house, with parking for up to sixty cars, as well as a secondary pitch for junior rugby matches a couple of minutes walk downriver. Bencoolen Meadow does not have any stands or covering areas other than the club-house terrace. Capacity is around 750 all-standing, although crowds of up to a 1,000 could be possible with obstructed views.

== Season summary ==
Season	League			National Cup(s)		Cornwall Cup(s)	
Season	Competition/Level	Position	Points	Competition	Performance	Competition	Performance
1987–88	Cornwall 1 (9)	6th	10				
1988–89	Cornwall 1 (9)						
1989–90	Cornwall 1 (9)						
1990–91	Cornwall 1 (9)	1st (promoted)					
1991–92	Cornwall/Devon (8)						
1992–93	Cornwall/Devon (8)	(relegated)					
1993–94	Cornwall 1 (9)						
1994–95	Cornwall 1 (9)						
1995–96	Cornwall 1 (9)	1st (promoted)					
1996–97	Cornwall/Devon (8)						
1997–98	Cornwall/Devon (8)	7th	13				
1998–99	Cornwall/Devon (8)	4th	17				
1999–00	Cornwall/Devon (8)	9th (Note: There was no relegation from Cornwall/Devon at the end of 1999–00 season, which meant Bude were saved from relegation despite finishing second from bottom.)	10				
2000–01	Cornwall/Devon (8)	8th (relegated) (Note: More teams than usual were relegated from Cornwall/Devon during the 2000–01 season, which meant 8th placed Bude went down.)	12			Cornwall Cup	Quarter-finals
2001–02	Cornwall 1 (9)	1st (promoted)	30	Powergen Intermediate Cup	1st round	Cornwall Clubs Cup	Winners
2002–03	Cornwall/Devon (8)	4th	22	Powergen Junior Vase	6th Round		
2003–04	Cornwall/Devon (8)	2nd (promoted)	39	Powergen Junior Vase	5th Round	Cornwall Cup	2nd round
2004–05	Western Counties West (7)	5th	27				
2005–06	Western Counties West (7)	5th	31	Powergen Intermediate Cup	1st round		
2006–07	Western Counties West (7)	8th	20	EDF Senior Vase	2nd round		
2007–08	Western Counties West (7)	5th	24	EDF Senior Vase	3rd round		
2008–09	Western Counties West (7)	11th (Note: There was no relegation from Western Counties West during 2008–09 season due to restructuring of the league system by the RFU, which meant 11th placed Bude were safe.)	9	EDF Senior Vase	3rd round	Cornwall Cup	Semi-finals
2009–10	Western Counties West (7)	10th	20			Cornwall Cup	Semi-finals
2010–11	Western Counties West (7)	11th	41 (Note: The 2010–11 season would see the introduction of bonus points into lower league English rugby union (tier 6 and below).)			Cornwall Cup	1st round
2011–12	Western Counties West (7)	8th	45			Cornwall Cup	Semi-finals
2012–13	Western Counties West (7)	11th	45			Cornwall Cup	Semi-finals
2013–14	Western Counties West (7)	13th (relegated)	38			Cornwall Cup	1st round
2014–15	Cornwall/Devon (8)	7th	64			Cornwall Cup	Quarter-finals
2015–16	Cornwall/Devon (8)	1st (promoted)	117			Cornwall Cup	Quarter-finals
2016–17	Western Counties West (7)	13th (relegated)	39			Cornwall Cup	Quarter-finals
2017–18	Cornwall/Devon (8)	5th	84			Cornwall Cup	1st round
2018–19	Cornwall/Devon (8)	3rd	104			Cornwall Cup	1st round
2019–20	Cornwall/Devon (8)	4th	82.13 (Note: The season was postponed and ultimately cancelled due to the COVID-19 pandemic in the United Kingdom with Bude sitting in 3rd, having played 19 games and gained 66 points. The remaining games were calculated on a 'best playing record formula', with Bude dropping to 4th place with 82.13 points.)			Cornwall Cup	
2020–21	Cornwall/Devon (8)	cancelled due to the COVID-19 pandemic				Cornwall Cup	
Green background indicates league champions (with promotion) or cup winners. Blue background stands for promotion without winning the league or losing cup finalists. Pink background stands for relegation.

== Honours ==
- Cornwall Sevens Junior Plate winners: 1972
- Cornwall Clubs Cup winners (2): 1972, 2002
- Cornwall Sevens Senior Plate winners: 1986
- Cornwall League 1 champions (2): 1995–96, 2001–02
- Alan Barbery Cup winners (2) 1995–96, 2001–02
- Tribute Cornwall/Devon champions: 2015–16

== Notable former players ==
- Phil Vickery – Barnstaple born tighthead prop who went to school in Bude and played for the club during his early career. Went onto have an outstanding professional career playing for Gloucester and Wasps, which also included gaining over 70 caps for England, captaining the side and winning the 2003 World Cup. Phil was also selected by the British and Irish Lions.

== See also ==
- Cornish rugby
