= 1987–88 Courage Cornwall League 1 =

Rugby union competition in England

- Countries: England
- Date: 12 September 1987 – 19 March 1988
- Champions: Illogan Park (1st title)
- Runners-up: Wadebridge Camels
- Relegated: St Just; Stithians
- Matches played: 55

The Courage Cornwall League 1 1987–88 was the first full season of rugby union within the ninth tier of the English league system, currently known as Tribute Cornwall League 1. Illogan Park finished the league season unbeaten, and as the first champions were promoted to the Courage Cornwall/Devon League for season 1988–89. Stithians lost all ten matches, finishing in last place and were relegated to Courage Cornwall League 2, along with St Just who finished one place above them.

== Participating teams and locations ==
The 1987–88 Courage Cornwall League 1 consists of eleven teams. Each team played one match against each of the other teams, playing a total of ten matches with five at home and five away. The season started on 12 September 1987 and ended on 19 March 1988.

Team	Ground	Capacity	City/Area
Bodmin	Clifden Park		Bodmin
Bude	Bencoolen Meadow	750	Bude
Helston	King George V Playing Field	2,500	Helston
Illogan Park	Illogan Park		Illogan
Liskeard Looe	Lux Park		Liskeard
Redruth Albany	Trewirgie		Redruth
St Agnes	Wheal Butson		St Agnes
St Just	Tregeseal		Tregeseal, St Just
Saltash	Moorlands Lane		Saltash
Stithians	Playing Field		Stithians
Wadebridge Camels	Bodieve Park		Wadebridge

== League table ==
1987–88 Courage Cornwall League One table
Pos	Team	Pld	W	D	L	PF	PA	PD	Pts	Qualification
1	Illogan Park (C)	10	9	1	0	163	61	+102	19	Promoted
2	Wadebridge Camels	10	8	1	1	200	89	+111	17	
3	Saltash	10	7	2	1	171	85	+86	16	
4	Helston	10	6	0	4	166	80	+86	12	
5	Liskeard Looe	10	5	1	4	129	87	+42	11	
6	Bude	10	4	2	4	105	90	+15	10	
7	St Agnes	10	4	1	5	131	120	+11	9	
8	Bodmin	10	4	0	6	128	126	+2	8	
9	Redruth Albany	10	3	0	7	93	154	−61	6	
10	St Just	10	1	0	9	41	310	−269	2	Relegated
11	Stithians	10	0	0	10	49	174	−125	0	Relegated

Rules for classification: Points are awarded as follows: 2 pts for a win, 1 pt for a draw, 0 pts for a loss
(C) Champions

== See also ==
- Rugby union in Cornwall
- English rugby union system
