= Falmouth RFC =

Rugby union club, based in Cornwall

Falmouth
- Full name: Falmouth Rugby Football Club
- Union: Cornwall RFU
- Nickname: Eagles
- Founded: 1873; 152 years ago
- Location: Falmouth, Cornwall, England
- Ground: The Recreation Ground (Capacity: 3,000)
- Chairman: John Bullock
- Coach: Josh Lord
- Captain: Tom Spiller
- League: Counties 2 Cornwall
- 2024–25: 3rd
1st kit	2nd kit

Official website
- www.falmouthrugbyclub.co.uk

Falmouth Rugby Football Club is a rugby union club based in the town of Falmouth, Cornwall, in the United Kingdom, playing in Counties 2 Cornwall at the eighth tier of the English league system, following relegation from Counties 1 Western West at the end of the 2023–24 season. The club play at the Recreation Ground. They enjoy a rivalry with close neighbours, Penryn.

== History ==
Founded in 1873, Falmouth have produced two players who have been capped by the England national team: John Jackett and Jim George. Jackett played thirteen times for England making his debut on 2 December 1905 against New Zealand at Crystal Palace. He also toured with the British Lions to New Zealand and Australia in 1908. Jim George made his debut against Scotland on 15 March 1947 and played a further two matches against France and Ireland. On 24 November 1926, Cornwall played what was considered the best New Zealand Māori rugby union team at Falmouth, with Cornwall winning 6–3.

During the 1970s the club had a relatively successful spell when they were considered one of the best sides in Cornwall, winning the Cornwall Cup twice as well as finishing top of the Cornwall Merit Table in 1977. When league rugby was introduced in 1987, Falmouth were placed in the Cornwall/Devon League, at tier 8 of the English rugby union system. Following the club's relegation at the end of the 1989–90 season they spent much of the next decade playing in Cornwall League 1. A second promotion from Cornwall League 1 early on in the 21st century, saw Falmouth consolidate its position in the Cornwall/Devon League, with fourteen uninterrupted seasons in tier 8. At the end of the 2017–18 season Falmouth won the Cornwall/Devon league title and with it promotion to Western Counties West, the highest level the club had reached so far.

== Season summary ==
Season	League			National Cup(s)		County Cup(s)	
Season	Competition/Level	Position	Points	Competition	Performance	Competition	Performance
1987–88	Cornwall/Devon (8)	5th	12				
1988–89	Cornwall/Devon (8)	3rd	12				
1989–90	Cornwall/Devon (8)	(relegated)					
1990–91	Cornwall 1 (9)	2nd					
1991–92	Cornwall 1 (9)					Cornwall Junior Knockout Plate	Winners
1992–93	Cornwall 1 (9)	2nd					
1993–94	Cornwall 1 (9)	2nd					
1994–95	Cornwall 1 (9)						
1995–96	Cornwall 1 (9)	2nd	16				
1996–97	Cornwall 1 (9)	1st (promoted)	34				
1997–98	Cornwall/Devon (8)	5th	20				
1998–99	Cornwall/Devon (8)	10th (relegated)	-6				
1999–00	Cornwall 1 (9)	7th	10				
2000–01	Cornwall 1 (9)	4th	16			Cornwall Clubs Cup	
2001–02	Cornwall 1 (9)	7th	12			Cornwall Clubs Cup	Semi-finals
2002–03	Cornwall 1 (9)	1st (promoted)	29	Powergen Junior Vase	5th Round	Cornwall Clubs Cup	Winners
2003–04	Cornwall/Devon (8)	8th	16	Powergen Junior Vase	1st Round		
2004–05	Cornwall/Devon (8)	9th	16	Powergen Junior Vase	3rd Round	Cornwall Cup	1st Round
2005–06	Cornwall/Devon (8)	3rd	31	Powergen Junior Vase	5th Round		
2006–07	Cornwall/Devon (8)	6th	21	EDF Energy Senior Vase	1st Round	Cornwall Cup	
2007–08	Cornwall/Devon (8)	7th	21	EDF Energy Senior Vase	2nd Round	Cornwall Cup	
2008–09	Cornwall/Devon (8)	14th (Note: There was no relegation from Cornwall/Devon at the end of 2008–09 season, which meant Falmouth were saved from relegation despite finishing bottom of the table.)	2	EDF Energy Senior Vase	1st Round		
2009–10	Cornwall/Devon (8)	8th	30			Cornwall Cup	Quarter-finals
2010–11	Cornwall/Devon (8)	6th	70 (Note: The 2010–11 season would see the introduction of bonus points into lower league English rugby union (tier 6 and below).)			Cornwall Cup	Quarter-finals
2011–12	Cornwall/Devon (8)	7th	67				
2012–13	Cornwall/Devon (8)	8th	51			Cornwall Cup	1st Round
2013–14	Cornwall/Devon (8)	6th	61				
2014–15	Cornwall/Devon (8)	6th	71			Cornwall Cup	1st Round
2015–16	Cornwall/Devon (8)	6th	75			Cornwall Cup	1st Round
2016–17	Cornwall/Devon (8)	1st (promoted)	112			Cornwall Cup	Semi-finals
2017–18	Western Counties West (7)	12th	49			Cornwall Cup	Quarter-finals
2018–19	Western Counties West (7)	7th	57			Cornwall Cup	1st Round
2019–20	Western Counties West (7)	10th	43.73 (Note: The season was postponed and ultimately cancelled due to the COVID-19 pandemic in the United Kingdom with Falmouth sitting in 8th, having played 22 games and gained 37 points. The remaining games were calculated on a 'best playing record formula', with Falmouth remaining in 10th place with 43.73 points.)			Cornwall Cup	
2020–21	Western Counties West (7)						
Green background stands for either league champions (with promotion) or cup winners. Blue background stands for promotion without winning league or losing cup finalists. Pink background stands for relegation.

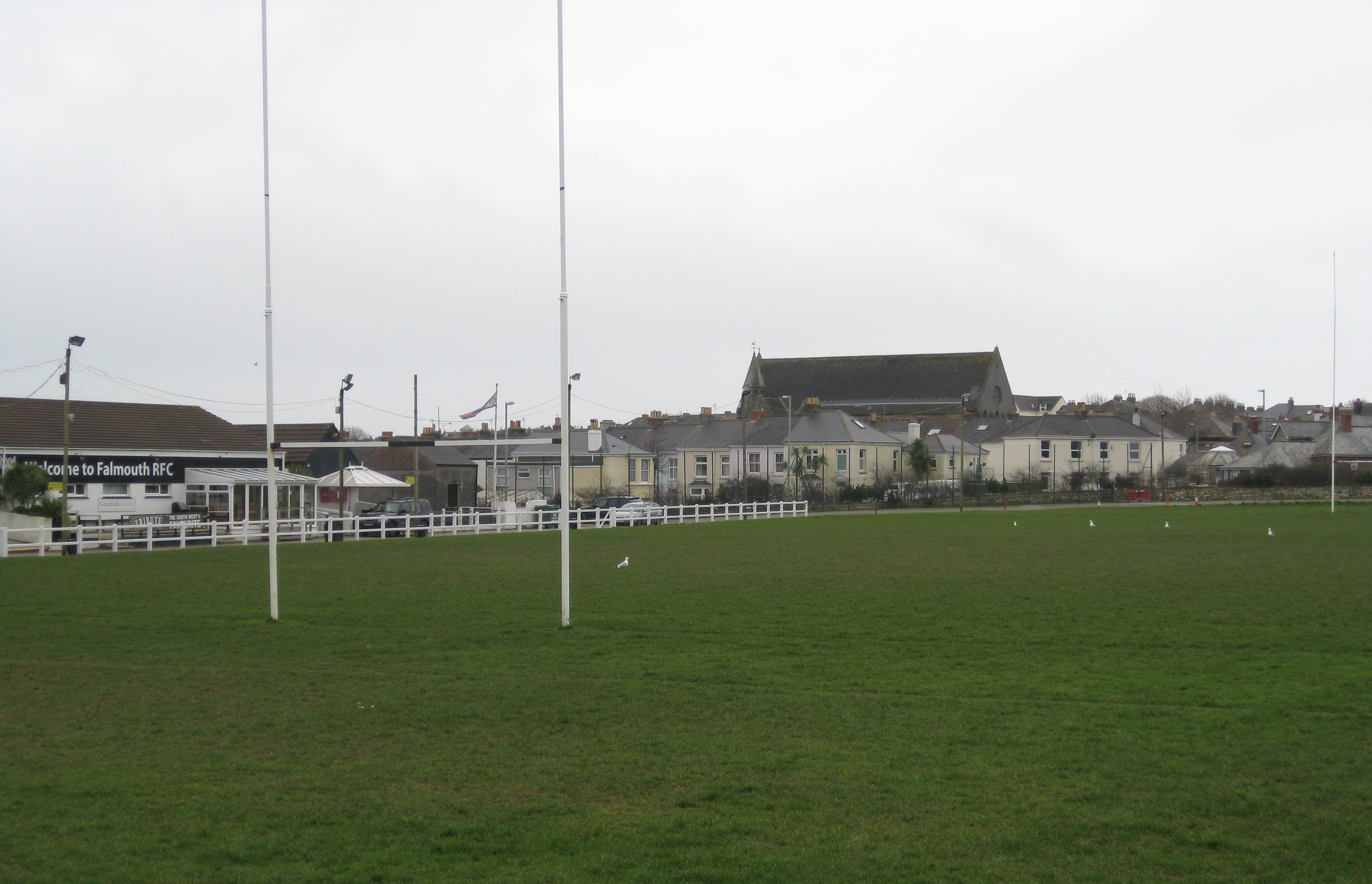
The Recreation Ground, home of Falmouth RFC

First team

Season	P	W	D	L	F	A	Ref
1899–1900	28	18	6	4	169	85	

Falmouth Albion Reserves

Season	P	W	D	L	F	A	Ref
1899–1900	19	12	2	5	158	75	

Falmouth One and All

Season	P	W	D	L	F	A	Ref
1899–1900	20	19	0	1	340	24	

== Honours ==
- Cornwall Club Champions: 1899–1900
- Cornwall Cup winners (2): 1973–74, 1976–77
- CRFU Official Merit Table champions: 1976–77
- Cornwall Clubs Cup winners (2): 1991–92, 2002–03
- Cornwall League 1 champions (2): 1996–97, 2002–03
- Tribute Cornwall/Devon champions: 2016–17

== See also ==
- Cornish rugby
