= Helston RFC =

Rugby union club, based in Cornwall

- Full name: Helston Rugby Football Club
- Union: Cornwall RFU
- Founded: 1965; 60 years ago
- Location: Helston, Cornwall, England
- Ground: King George V Playing Field (Capacity: 2,500 (no seating))
- League: Counties 2 Cornwall
- 2024–25: 2nd
Team kit

Helston RFC is a rugby union club in Cornwall which has been in existence since 1965. They currently play in Counties 2 Cornwall, following relegation from Cornwall League 1 in 2018–19. In season 1995–96 side they reached the final of the RFU Pilkington Shield, and are one of only three Cornish club sides to have played in a competitive final at Twickenham (alongside Mount's Bay RFC and the Cornish Pirates).

== History ==
Helston RFC was formed in 1965, when a group of men within the town of Helston decided that rugby had a place within the local community. Their first game took place against Penryn 2nd XV, which resulted in a 14–9 loss and their first victory occurred a few games later against the Newquay Hornets. The club would go on to win several Junior Cups throughout the 1980s, with victories over Bodmin, Liskeard-Looe, St Agnes and Bude, and have also won the Cornwall 2 league title on four occasions, more than any other club.

In 1995–96 season, the club reached the final of the Pilkington Shield (now the Powergen Vase), which is some achievement for a small club as it was the largest club rugby competition in the world, with 501 teams competing. They eventually lost at Twickenham on the 4 May 1996, against Medicals RFC (16–6) from Newcastle. Following on from their previous successes in cup competitions, and despite a difficult season on the field, Helston made the final of the CRFU Skinners Junior Cup in season 2009–10 against Roseland. The final score was 23–19 to Roseland but Helston held their heads up high.

== King George V Playing Field ==
The King George V Playing Field has been in use by the club since the club played its first match in 1965. It is owned by Cornwall Council. Until recently, the facilities at the site were extremely poor by any standards. However, on the 20 April 2006, a new clubhouse was opened which included two top quality changing rooms and a brand new bar facility. It is also the venue for an annual road race An Resek Helys (The Race for Helston). Current supporter capacity is approximately 2,500, all of which is standing.

== Season summary ==
Season	League			National Cup(s)		County Cup(s)	
Season	Competition/Level	Position	Points	Competition	Performance	Competition	Performance
1987–88	Cornwall 1 (9)	4th	12			Cornwall Junior Knockout Plate	Winners
1988–89	Cornwall 1 (9)					Cornwall Junior Knockout Plate	Winners
1989–90	Cornwall 1 (9)	(relegated)					
1990–91	Cornwall 2 (10)	1st (promoted)				Cornwall Junior Knockout Plate	Winners
1991–92	Cornwall 1 (9)	(relegated)					
1992–93	Cornwall 2 (10)	1st (promoted)				Cornwall Junior Knockout Plate	Runners up
1993–94	Cornwall 1 (9)						
1994–95	Cornwall 1 (9)						
1995–96	Cornwall 1 (9)			Pilkington Shield	Runners up	Cornwall Junior Knockout Plate	Runners up
1996–97	Cornwall 1 (9)	3rd	20				
1997–98	Cornwall 1 (9)	7th	12				
1998–99	Cornwall 1 (9)	7th	10				
1999–00	Cornwall 1 (9)	6th	12				
2000–01	Cornwall 1 (9)	7th	7				
2001–02	Cornwall 1 (9)	8th	10				
2002–03	Cornwall 1 (9)	9th (relegated)	1			Cornwall Clubs Cup	2nd Round
2003–04	Cornwall 2 (10)	1st (promoted)	25	Powergen Junior Vase			
2004–05	Cornwall 1 (9)	8th (relegated)	2	Powergen Junior Vase			
2005–06	Cornwall 2 (10)	1st (promoted)	25	Powergen Junior Vase			
2006–07	Cornwall 1 (9)	4th	13	EDF Junior Vase	4th Round	Cornwall Clubs Cup	Quarter-finals (Note: Helston reached the semi-finals of the 2006–07 Cornwall Clubs Cup but were eliminated from the competition for fielding an unregistered player in a Cornwall 1 league game earlier in the season.)
2007–08	Cornwall 1 (9)	2nd (lost promotion playoff)	26			Cornwall Clubs Cup	Semi-finals
2008–09	Cornwall 1 (9)	5th	12	EDF Junior Vase	2nd Round		
2009–10	Cornwall 1 (9)	11th (Note: There was no relegation from Cornwall 1 at the end of the 2009–10 season.)	9			Cornwall Clubs Cup	Runners up
2010–11	Cornwall 1 (9)	3rd	63 (Note: The 2010–11 season would see the introduction of bonus points into lower league English rugby union (tier 6 and below).)				
2011–12	Cornwall 1 (9)	2nd (lost promotion playoff)	67			Cornwall Clubs Cup	Semi-finals
2012–13	Cornwall 1 (9)	6th	24				
2013–14	Cornwall 1 (9)	6th	24	RFU Junior Vase	3rd Round (Note: The 3rd Round of the RFU Junior Cup for Cornish clubs was also known as the area semi-finals.)	Cornwall Clubs Cup	Semi-finals
2014–15	Cornwall 1 (9)	6th	21	RFU Junior Vase	1st Round	Cornwall Clubs Cup	Quarter-finals
2015–16	Cornwall 1 (9)	6th	19	RFU Junior Vase	1st Round	Cornwall Clubs Cup	Quarter-finals
2016–17	Cornwall 1 (9)	5th	25			Cornwall Clubs Plate	Winners
2017–18	Cornwall 2 (10) (Note: The 2017–18 season saw teams in Cornwall 1 and Cornwall 2 start the season in a single division. Half way through the league would then split in two with the top 8 playing for the Cornwall 1 title and the bottom 7 playing for the Cornwall 2. This meant that Helston (who finished 12th during the first stage) played the second stage in Cornwall 2, despite having been in Cornwall 1 the previous season. The structure was not overly popular and would revert to single divisions the following season, with Helston once more in Cornwall 1.)	1st (promoted)	60				
2018–19	Cornwall 1 (9)	8th (relegated)	15	RFU Junior Vase	Group Stage		
2019–20	Cornwall 2 (10)	2nd (promoted)	38				
2020–21	Cornwall 1 (9)	Due to the COVID-19 pandemic, the 2020–21 season was cancelled.					
2021–22	Cornwall 1 (9)	4th					
2022–23	Counties 2 Cornwall (8)	8th					
2023–24	Counties 2 Cornwall (8)	8th					
2024–25	Counties 2 Cornwall (8)	2nd					
Green background stands for either league champions (with promotion) or cup winners. Blue background stands for promotion without winning league or losing cup finalists. Pink background stands for relegation.

== Honours ==
- Cornwall Clubs Cup winners (6): 1980–81, 1984–85, 1985–86, 1987–88, 1988–89, 1990–91
- Cornwall 2 champions (5): 1990–91, 1992–93, 2003–04, 2005–06, 2017–18
- Pilkington Shield runners up: 1995–96
- CRFU Cornwall Club Plate winners: 2016–17

== Notable former players ==
- (England) Ricky Pellow – started his career with the club before playing at a higher level with Worcester Warriors and Bath, with whom he won the Heineken Cup in 1998. Also achieved multiple caps for Cornwall.

== See also ==
- Cornish rugby
