= 2010–11 Tribute Cornwall/Devon League =

- Countries: England
- Champions: Bideford
- Runners-up: St Austell
- Promoted: Bideford and St Austell
- Relegated: Saltash, Stithians and Roseland
- Matches played: 182

The 2010–11 Tribute Cornwall/Devon League was the 24th full season of rugby union within the eighth tier of the English league system. Bideford the champions and the runners–up St Austell were promoted to the Tribute Western Counties West for 2011–12. Saltash, Stithians and Roseland were relegated to Tribute Cornwall One for the following season. For the first time the points scoring system with bonus points for tries, etc. was introduced.

== Table ==
2010–2011 Tribute Cornwall/Devon League table
Pos	Team	Pld	W	D	L	PF	PA	PD	TF	TA	TB	LB	Pts	Qualification
1	Bideford (C)	26	25	0	1	1208	256	+952	0	0	22	1	123	Promoted
2	St Austell	26	23	0	3	937	286	+651	0	0	16	1	109	Promoted
3	Hayle	25	18	0	7	784	459	+325	0	0	15	2	89	
4	Crediton	26	18	0	8	802	491	+311	0	0	13	1	86	
5	Liskeard–Looe	25	16	0	9	566	376	+190	0	0	12	3	79	
6	Falmouth	26	15	0	11	504	502	+2	0	0	7	3	70	
7	Totnes	26	15	1	10	564	588	−24	0	0	4	3	69	
8	Honiton	26	15	0	11	736	454	+282	0	0	10	3	68 (Note: 5 points deducted)	
9	Teignmouth	26	9	0	17	556	616	−60	0	0	6	7	49	
10	Withycombe	26	8	1	17	518	551	−33	0	0	6	7	47	
11	Torrington	26	7	1	18	329	844	−515	0	0	2	3	35	
12	Saltash	26	3	2	21	447	929	−482	0	0	4	7	27	Relegated
13	Stithians	26	3	2	21	251	864	−613	0	0	2	3	11 (Note: 10 points deducted)	Relegated
14	Roseland	26	2	1	23	210	1196	−986	0	0	1	2	8	Relegated

Rules for classification: Points are awarded as follows: four points for a win; two points for a draw; no points for a loss; one bonus point for scoring four tries or more in a match; one bonus point for losing by seven points or less. If teams are level at any stage, tiebreakers are applied in the following order: (1) difference between points for and against; (2) total number of points for.
(C) Champion

== See also ==
- English rugby union system
