= Jim George (rugby union) =

England international rugby union player

- Full name: James Thomas George
- Born: 24 August 1918 Falmouth, Cornwall, England
- Died: 1975 (aged 57) Truro, Cornwall, England

Rugby union career
- Position: Lock
International career
Years	Team	Apps	(Points)
1947–49	England	3	(0)

James Thomas George (1918 – 1975) was an English international rugby union player.

Raised in Falmouth, Cornwall, George was a tireless lock who was a latecomer to rugby, switching from football in his late 20s to play for the Falmouth RFC. He toured with the Barbarians in 1947. Capped three times for England, Vaughan featured in their 1947 and 1949 Five Nations campaigns, with injuries depriving him of further opportunities.

George worked as a fitter at Falmouth docks and was also a chicken farmer.

== See also ==
- List of England national rugby union players
