= 1987–88 Courage Cornwall/Devon League =

Rugby union competition in England

- Countries: England
- Date: 12 September 1987 – 26 March 1988
- Champions: Crediton (1st title)
- Runners-up: Exmouth
- Relegated: St Austell and Newton Abbot
- Matches played: 55

The 1987–88 Courage Cornwall/Devon League was the first full season of rugby union within the eighth tier of the English league system currently known as Tribute Cornwall/Devon. The league consisted of eleven teams; six from Devon and five from Cornwall. Each team played one match against each of the other teams, playing a total of ten matches with five at home and five away. Both Crediton and Exmouth won nine of their ten matches, with Crediton declared champions because of their superior points difference, and winning promotion to the Western Counties league for season 1988–89. Newton Abbot, lost all ten matches and were relegated to Devon One while St Austell, with one win and a draw, were relegated to Cornwall One.

== Participating teams and locations ==
Team	Ground	Capacity	City/Area
Bideford	King George's Field	2,000	Bideford, Devon
Crediton	Blagdon		Crediton, Devon
Exmouth	Imperial Recreation Ground	1,250	Exmouth, Devon
Falmouth	Recreation Ground	3,000	Falmouth, Cornwall
Hayle	Memorial Park		Hayle, Cornwall
Newton Abbot	Rackerhayes	1,150	Newton Abbot, Devon
Paignton	Queen's Park	1,650	Paignton, Devon
Penryn	Memorial Ground	4,000	Penryn, Cornwall
Penzance-Newlyn	Mennaye Field	4,000	Penzance, Cornwall
St Austell	Penrice School Fields		St Austell, Cornwall
Teignmouth	Bitton Sports Ground	1,210	Teignmouth, Devon

== League table ==
1987–88 Courage Cornwall/Devon League table
Pos	Team	Pld	W	D	L	PF	PA	PD	Pts	Qualification
1	Crediton (C)	10	9	0	1	232	65	+167	27	Promoted
2	Exmouth	10	9	0	1	187	64	+123	27	
3	Penryn	10	8	1	1	191	67	+124	25	
4	Penzance–Newlyn	10	6	1	3	166	111	+55	19	
5	Falmouth	10	6	0	4	110	140	−30	18	
6	Paignton	10	5	0	5	156	157	−1	15	
7	Teignmouth	10	4	0	6	112	176	−64	12	
8	Bideford	10	3	0	7	160	153	+7	9	
9	Hayle	10	2	1	7	107	157	−50	7	
10	St Austell	10	1	1	8	69	193	−124	4	Relegated
11	Newton Abbot	10	0	0	10	31	238	−207	0	Relegated

Rules for classification: Points are awarded as follows: 2 pts for a win, 1 pt for a draw, 0 pts for a loss. If teams are level at any stage, the following tiebreaker is applied: Difference between points for and against.
(C) Champions

== Sponsorship ==
The Cornwall/Devon League was part of the Courage Clubs Championship and was sponsored by Courage Brewery.

== See also ==
- English rugby union system
- Rugby union in Cornwall
