= 1988–89 Courage Cornwall/Devon League =

Rugby union competition in England

Courage Cornwall/Devon League
- Countries: England
- Champions: Penryn
- Runners-up: Teignmouth
- Promoted: Penryn
- Relegated: Paignton, Exmouth and Hayle
- Matches played: 55

The Courage Cornwall/Devon League 1988–89 was the second full season of rugby union within the Cornwall/Devon League with six teams from Devon and five from Cornwall. Each team played one match against each of the other teams in the league, playing a total of ten matches with five at home and five away. Penryn, the champions, were promoted to the Courage Western Counties league for season 1989–90, Paignton and Exmouth relegated to Courage Devon One and Hayle relegated to Courage Cornwall One.

== Participating teams and locations ==
Team	Ground	Capacity	City/Area	Previous season
Bideford	King George's Field	2,000	Bideford, Devon	8th
Exeter Saracens	Exhibition Fields		Whipton, Exeter, Devon	Promoted from Devon 1 (champions)
Exmouth	Imperial Recreation Ground	1,250	Exmouth, Devon	Runners up
Falmouth	Recreation Ground	3,000	Falmouth, Cornwall	5th
Hayle	Memorial Park		Hayle, Cornwall	9th
Illogan Park	Illogan Park		Illogan, Cornwall	Promoted from Cornwall 1 (champions)
Paignton	Queen's Park	1,650	Paignton, Devon	6th
Penryn	Memorial Ground	4,000	Penryn, Cornwall	3rd
Penzance-Newlyn	Mennaye Field	4,000	Penzance, Cornwall	4th
Sidmouth	Blackmore Field		Sidmouth, Devon	Relegated from Western Counties
Teignmouth	Bitton Sports Ground	1,210	Teignmouth, Devon	7th

== Table ==
1988–89 Courage Cornwall/Devon League table
Pos	Team	Pld	W	D	L	PF	PA	PD	Pts	Qualification
1	Penryn (C)	10	9	0	1	261	64	+197	18	Promoted
2	Teignmouth	10	6	0	4	146	106	+40	12	
3	Falmouth	10	6	0	4	116	117	−1	12	
4	Sidmouth	10	6	0	4	104	123	−19	12	
5	Bideford	10	5	0	5	141	138	+3	10	
6	Illogan Park	10	5	0	5	84	105	−21	10	
7	Penzance–Newlyn	10	5	0	5	120	147	−27	10	
8	Exeter Saracens	10	5	0	5	81	123	−42	10	
9	Paignton	10	4	0	6	114	152	−38	8	Relegated
10	Exmouth	10	2	0	8	130	134	−4	4	Relegated
11	Hayle	10	2	0	8	108	196	−88	4	Relegated

Rules for classification: Points are awarded as follows: 2 pts for a win; 1 pt for a draw; 0 pts for a loss
(C) Champions

== Sponsorship ==
The Cornwall/Devon League was part of the Courage Clubs Championship and was sponsored by Courage Brewery

== See also ==
- English rugby union system
