= Wadebridge Camels =

Rugby union club based in Cornwall

- Full name: Wadebridge Camels Rugby Football Club
- Union: Cornwall RFU
- Founded: 1955; 71 years ago
- Location: Wadebridge, Cornwall
- Ground: Molesworth Field (Capacity: 500)
- Chairman: Martin Bricknell
- President: Terry Gardner
- Coach(es): Mike Rawlings, Matt Bailey, Tom Rawlings
- League: Regional 2 South West
- 2025–26: 3rd
Team kit

Official website
- www.pitchero.com/clubs/wadebridgecamels

Wadebridge Camels RFC is a rugby union club based in Wadebridge, Cornwall which has been in existence since 1955. They play at Molesworth Field. The Camels currently play in Regional 2 South West a level six league in the English rugby union system.

== History ==
Wadebridge played in the Tribute South West 1 West, for four seasons having won promotion from the Tribute Western Counties West by beating Tribute Western Counties North runner-up Thornbury RFC by 25 points to 21 at the end of the 2009–10 season. In what proved to be a very successful season for the Camels, Wadebridge followed up their promotion by winning the Skinners Cornwall Cup final for the second time in three years by beating defending champions St Ives by 26 points to 21.

=== 2008–09 EDF Energy National Trophy ===
The Camels qualified for the competition by winning the Cornwall Cup. The club was knocked out in the third round by Tynedale.

== Season summary ==
Season	League			National Cup(s)		County Cup(s)	
Season	Competition/Level	Position	Points	Competition	Performance	Competition	Performance
1987–88	Cornwall 1 (9)	2nd	17				
1988–89	Cornwall 1 (9)	1st (promoted)					
1989–90	Cornwall/Devon (8)	(relegated)					
1990–91	Cornwall 1 (9)						
1991–92	Cornwall 1 (9)	(relegated)					
1992–93	Cornwall 2 (10)	2nd (promoted)				Cornwall Junior Knockout Plate	Winners
1993–94	Cornwall 1 (9)						
1994–95	Cornwall 1 (9)						
1995–96	Cornwall 1 (9)	(relegated)					
1996–97	Cornwall 2 (10)	2nd (promoted)					
1997–98	Cornwall 1 (9)	2nd	29				
1998–99	Cornwall 1 (9)	5th	12				
1999–00	Cornwall 1 (9)	3rd	22				
2000–01	Cornwall 1 (9)	2nd (promoted via playoff)	28	Tetley's Bitter Vase	6th Round	Cornwall Clubs Cup	Winners
2001–02	Cornwall/Devon (8)	6th	20			Cornwall Cup	
2002–03	Cornwall/Devon (8)	5th	17			Cornwall Cup	2nd Round
2003–04	Cornwall/Devon (8)	6th	21			Cornwall Cup	2nd Round
2004–05	Cornwall/Devon (8)	8th	18				
2005–06	Cornwall/Devon (8)	7th	20	Powergen Junior Vase	5th Round		
2006–07	Cornwall/Devon (8)	2nd (promoted)	38	EDF Energy Senior Vase	4th Round		
2007–08	Western Counties West (7)	3rd	27	EDF Energy Senior Vase	5th Round	Cornwall Cup	Winners
2008–09	Western Counties West (7)	3rd	28	EDF Energy Trophy	3rd Round		
2009–10	Western Counties West (7)	2nd (promoted via playoff)	44			Cornwall Cup	Winners
2010–11	South West 1 West (6)	6th	65 (Note: The 2010–11 season would see the introduction of bonus points into lower league English rugby union (tier 6 and below).)			Cornwall Cup	Runners up
2011–12	South West 1 West (6)	6th	68			Cornwall Cup	Winners
2012–13	South West 1 West (6)	5th	69			Cornwall Cup	Runners up
2013–14	South West 1 West (6)	12th (relegated)	35			Cornwall Cup	Quarter-finals
2014–15	Western Counties West (7)	5th	75			Cornwall Cup	Quarter-finals
2015–16	Western Counties West (7)	10th	53	RFU Intermediate Cup	4th Round	Cornwall Cup	Semi-finals
2016–17	Western Counties West (7)	5th	71			Cornwall Cup	Runners up
2017–18	Western Counties West (7)	5th	75			Cornwall Cup	Runners up
2018–19	Western Counties West (7)	6th	66	RFU Intermediate Cup	Semi-finals (SW)	Cornwall Cup	Winners
2019–20	Western Counties West (7)	5th	79.65 (Note: The season was postponed and ultimately cancelled due to the COVID-19 pandemic in the United Kingdom with Wadebridge sitting in 5th, having played 21 games and gained 65 points. The remaining games were calculated on a 'best playing record formula', with Wadebridge remaining in 5th place with 79.65 points.)			Cornwall Cup	
2020–21	Western Counties West (7)						
Green background stands for either league champions (with promotion) or cup winners. Blue background stands for promotion without winning league or losing cup finalists. Pink background stands for relegation.

== Honours ==
- Cornwall Clubs Cup winners (6): 1972–73, 1975–76, 1976–77, 1977–78, 1992–93, 2000–01
- Cornwall League 1 champions: 1988–89
- Cornwall Cup winners (4): 2007–08, 2009–10, 2011–12, 2018–19
- Cornwall 1 v Devon 1 promotion play-off winners: 2000–01
- Tribute Western Counties (north v west) promotion play-off winners: 2009–10

== England Counties Squad ==
- Zac Cinnamond – England Counties (U20) tour to Georgia, May 2013.

== See also ==
- Cornish rugby
