= Counties 2 Cornwall =

English level eight rugby union league

- Current season or competition: 2025–26 Counties 2 Cornwall
- Sport: Rugby union
- Instituted: 1987; 39 years ago
- Number of teams: 12
- Country: England
- Holders: Camborne II (1st title) (2025–26 (promoted to Counties 1 Western West)
- Most titles: Saltash (6 titles)

Counties 2 Cornwall (sponsored by St Austell Brewery using the Tribute brand name) is an English level eight rugby union league for clubs based in Cornwall. The champions are promoted to Counties 1 Western West and two teams are relegated to Counties 3 Cornwall. For the first time, reserve teams are allowed to participate. The 2025–26 champions are Camborne II team.

Until the 2021–22 season it was known as Tribute Cornwall League 1 and was a level nine league. It has been running continually since the 1987–88 season. The champions were promoted to the Cornwall/Devon, and the runner-up played the second team in Devon 1, with the winning team also gaining promotion. One or two teams were usually relegated to Cornwall 2.

== Format ==
The champions are promoted to Counties 1 Western West (formerly Western Counties West), while the last one or two teams are relegated to Counties 3 Cornwall. The season runs from September to April and comprises twenty-two rounds of matches, with each club playing each of its rivals, home and away. The results of the matches contribute points to the league as follows:

- 4 points are awarded for a win
- 2 points are awarded for a draw
- 0 points are awarded for a loss, however
- 1 losing (bonus) point is awarded to a team that loses a match by 7 points or fewer
- 1 additional (bonus) point is awarded to a team scoring 4 tries or more in a match.

== 2026–27 ==
Departing were Camborne II promoted to Counties 1 Western West while Bodmin (12th) were relegated to Counties 3 Cornwall.

Team	Ground	CapacityLL	Town/Village	Previous season
Bude	Bencoolen Meadow	750	Bude, Cornwall	3rd
Falmouth	Recreation Ground	3,000	Falmouth, Cornwall	4th
Helston	King George V Playing Field	2,500	Helston	2nd
Launceston II	Polson Bridge	3,000 (194 seats)	Launceston	8th
Liskeard-Looe	Lux Park		Liskeard	6th
Newquay Hornets	Newquay Sports Ground		Newquay	7th
Penryn	Memorial Ground	4,000 (200 seats)	Penryn, Cornwall	Relegated from Counties 1 Western West (11th)
Perranporth	Ponsmere Valley		Perranporth	5th
St Agnes	Enys Parc		St Agnes	Promoted from Counties 3 Cornwall (champions)
St Austell II	Tregorrick Park	4,000 (300 seats)	St Austell	9th
St Just	Tregeseal		Tregeseal, St Just	11th
Wadebridge Camels II	Molesworth Field	500	Wadebridge	10th

Locations of the 2026–27 Counties 2 Cornwall teams

== 2025–26 ==
Departing were Saltash promoted to Counties 1 Western West while Hayle were relegated to Counties 3 Cornwall. Entering the league were Camborne 2XV playing in league rugby for the first time, Bude relegated from Counties 1 Western West and Launceston 2XV, promoted from Counties 3 Cornwall.

Team	Ground	CapacityLL	Town/Village	Previous season
Bodmin	Clifden Park		Bodmin	10th
Bude	Bencoolen Meadow	750	Bude, Cornwall	Relegated from Counties 1 Western West (10th)
Camborne II	Crane Park (Note: Also known as the Recreation Ground.)	7,000 (780 seats)	Camborne, Cornwall	New entry
Falmouth	Recreation Ground	3,000	Falmouth, Cornwall	3rd
Helston	King George V Playing Field	2,500	Helston	2nd
Launceston II	Polson Bridge	3,000 (194 seats)	Launceston	Promoted from Counties 3 Cornwall (champions)
Liskeard-Looe	Lux Park		Liskeard	8th
Newquay Hornets	Newquay Sports Ground		Newquay	5th
Perranporth	Ponsmere Valley		Perranporth	4th
St Austell II	Tregorrick Park	4,000 (300 seats)	St Austell	9th
St Just	Tregeseal		Tregeseal, St Just	7th
Wadebridge Camels II	Molesworth Field	500	Wadebridge	6th

Locations of the 2025–26 Counties 2 Cornwall teams

=== League table ===
2025–26 Counties 2 Cornwall
Pos	Team	Played	Won	Draw	Lost	For	Against	Diff	Try bonus	Loss bonus	Pts	Pts adj
1	Camborne II (P)	22	20	0	2	814	315	499	13	1	100	+6
2	Helston	22	16	0	6	589	368	221	12	5	83	+2
3	Bude	22	17	0	5	675	307	368	12	2	82
4	Falmouth	22	14	1	7	605	490	115	13	0	71
5	Perranporth	22	14	0	8	541	315	226	8	1	56	−9
6	Liskeard-Looe	22	12	0	10	411	377	34	6	3	53
7	Newquay Hornets	22	11	0	11	490	422	68	8	4	52	−4
8	Launceston II	22	9	1	12	472	737	−265	9	2	49
9	St Austell II	22	9	0	13	407	516	−109	5	5	46
10	Wadebridge Camels II	22	6	0	16	482	658	−176	10	6	41	+1
11	St Just	22	3	0	19	436	690	−254	6	5	23
12	Bodmin (R)	22	0	0	22	121	848	−727	0	1	−19	−20
Points are awarded as follows: 4 points for a win; 2 points for a draw; 0 points for a loss; 1 point for scoring four tries; 1 point for losing by seven points or less; If teams are level at any stage, tiebreakers are applied in the following order: 1. Number of matches won 2. Difference between points for and against 3. Total number of points for 4. Aggregate number of points scored in matches between tied teams 5. Number of matches won excluding the first match, then the second and so on until the tie is settled
Green background is the promotion place. Pink background is the relegation place (subject to confirmation by the RFU). Updated: 29 April 2026

== 2024–25 ==
Departing were Redruth II promoted to Counties 1 Western West while Camborne School of Mines and Illogan Park were relegated to Counties 3 Cornwall. Veor (5th in 2023–24) started the season but subsequently withdrew.

Team	Ground	Capacity	Town/Village	Previous season
Bodmin	Clifden Park		Bodmin	10th
Falmouth	Recreation Ground	3,000	Falmouth, Cornwall	Relegated from Counties 1 Western West (12th)
Hayle	Memorial Park		Hayle	Promoted from Counties 3 Cornwall (1st)
Helston	King George V Playing Field	2,500	Helston	8th
Liskeard-Looe	Lux Park		Liskeard	9th
Newquay Hornets	Newquay Sports Ground		Newquay	6th
Perranporth	Ponsmere Valley		Perranporth	3rd
Saltash	Moorlands Lane		Saltash	2nd
St Austell II	Tregorrick Park	4,000 (300 seats)	St Austell	4th
St Just	Tregeseal		Tregeseal, St Just	7th
Veor (Note: Withdrew during the season.)	Memorial Ground	500	Camborne	5th
Wadebridge Camels II	Molesworth Field	500	Wadebridge	Promoted from Counties 3 Cornwall (2nd)

Locations of the 2024–25 Counties 2 Cornwall teams

=== League table ===
2024–25 Counties 2 Cornwall
Pos	Team	Played	Won	Draw	Lost	For	Against	Diff	Try bonus	Loss bonus	Pts	Pts adj
1	Saltash	20	20	0	0	952	109	843	14	0	100
2	Helston	20	17	0	3	541	264	277	9	1	81
3	Falmouth	20	14	0	6	520	507	13	9	2	67
4	Perranporth	20	13	0	7	567	365	202	8	2	62
5	Newquay Hornets	20	12	0	8	566	349	217	11	5	59
6	Wadebridge Camels II	20	8	0	12	392	571	−179	8	4	44
7	St Just	20	6	0	14	265	580	−315	5	2	31
8	Liskeard-Looe	20	5	0	15	288	394	−106	4	7	31
9	St Austell II	20	6	0	14	290	451	−161	4	1	29
10	Bodmin	20	4	0	16	342	713	−371	5	6	27
11	Hayle	20	5	0	15	321	741	−420	7	3	20	−10
Points are awarded as follows: 4 points for a win; 2 points for a draw; 0 points for a loss; 1 point for scoring four tries; 1 point for losing by seven points or less; If teams are level at any stage, tiebreakers are applied in the following order: 1. Number of matches won 2. Difference between points for and against 3. Total number of points for 4. Aggregate number of points scored in matches between tied teams 5. Number of matches won excluding the first match, then the second and so on until the tie is settled
Green background are promotion places. Pink background are relegation places. Updated: 21 August 2025

== 2023–24 ==
Departing were St Ives promoted to Counties 1 Western West while Hayle were relegated to Counties 3 Cornwall.

Team	Ground	Capacity	Town/Village	Previous season
Bodmin	Clifden Park		Bodmin	7th
Camborne School of Mines	Memorial Park, Kernick Road		Penryn	11th
Helston	King George V Playing Field	2,500	Helston	8th
Illogan Park	Paynters Lane Playing Field		Illogan	9th
Liskeard-Looe	Lux Park		Liskeard	6th
Newquay Hornets	Newquay Sports Ground		Newquay	10th
Perranporth	Ponsmere Valley		Perranporth	Promoted from Counties 3 Cornwall (1st)
Redruth II	The Recreation Ground	3,500 (580 seats)	Redruth	5th
Saltash	Moorlands Lane		Saltash	2nd
St Austell II	Tregorrick Park	4,000 (300 seats)	St Austell	4th
St Just	Tregeseal		Tregeseal, St Just	Promoted from Counties 3 Cornwall (2nd)
Veor	Memorial Ground	500	Camborne	3rd

Locations of the 2023–24 Counties 2 Cornwall teams

=== League table ===
2023–24 Counties 2 Cornwall
Pos	Team	Played	Won	Draw	Lost	For	Against	Diff	Try bonus	Loss bonus	Pts	Pts adj
1	Redruth II	22	22	0	0	1107	194	913	19	0	109
2	Saltash	22	20	0	2	1084	164	920	18	1	103
3	Perranporth	22	16	0	6	831	373	458	14	2	80
4	St Austell II	22	14	2	6	571	393	178	11	0	68	−4
5	Veor	22	10	2	10	464	437	27	8	1	49	−4
6	Newquay Hornets	22	10	0	12	420	543	−123	9	2	49	−2
7	St Just	22	10	0	12	358	576	−218	8	3	47	−5
8	Helston	22	10	1	11	366	626	−260	5	1	36	−12
9	Liskeard-Looe	22	8	1	13	286	403	−117	3	1	31	−7
10	Bodmin	22	4	0	18	289	733	−444	6	3	25
11	Illogan Park	22	4	0	18	187	820	−633	1	1	19
12	Camborne School of Mines	22	1	0	21	169	870	−701	2	0	−1	−7
Points are awarded as follows: 4 points for a win; 2 points for a draw; 0 points for a loss; 1 point for scoring four tries; 1 point for losing by seven points or less; If teams are level at any stage, tiebreakers are applied in the following order: 1. Number of matches won 2. Difference between points for and against 3. Total number of points for 4. Aggregate number of points scored in matches between tied teams 5. Number of matches won excluding the first match, then the second and so on until the tie is settled
Green background are promotion places. Pink background are relegation places. Updated: 14 July 2024

== 2022–23 ==
=== Participating teams and locations ===
Team	Ground	Capacity	Town/Village	Previous season
Bodmin	Clifden Park		Bodmin	1st
Camborne School of Mines	Memorial Park, Kernick Road		Penryn	2nd
Hayle	Memorial Park		Hayle	Cornwall/Devon League (14th)
Helston	King George V Playing Field	2,500	Helston	4th
Illogan Park	Paynters Lane Playing Field		Illogan	3rd
Liskeard-Looe	Lux Park		Liskeard	Cornwall/Devon League (12th)
Newquay Hornets	Newquay Sports Ground		Newquay	Cornwall/Devon League (13th)
Redruth II	The Recreation Ground	3,500 (580 seats)	Redruth	First league season
Saltash	Moorlands Lane		Saltash	Cornwall/Devon League (9th)
St Austell II	Tregorrick Park	4,000 (300 seats)	St Austell	First league season
St Ives	Recreation Ground	3,000 (275 seats)	St Ives	Promoted from Cornwall League 2 (champions)
Veor	Memorial Ground	500	Camborne	Cornwall/Devon League (7th)

Locations of the 2022–23 Counties 2 Cornwall teams

=== League table ===
2022–23 Counties 2 Cornwall
Pos	Team	Played	Won	Draw	Lost	For	Against	Diff	Try bonus	Loss bonus	Pts	Pts adj
1	St Ives	22	20	1	1	725	177	548	14	1	102
2	Saltash	22	18	1	1	915	202	713	13	0	96
3	Veor	22	17	1	4	726	421	305	14	1	87
4	St Austell II	22	5	1	6	210	259	−49	3	3	85
5	Redruth II	22	9	1	12	399	490	−91	6	4	49
6	Liskeard-Looe	22	10	0	12	241	348	−107	4	3	48
7	Bodmin	22	9	0	13	340	607	−267	4	2	44
8	Helston	22	9	0	13	383	522	−139	6	5	42	−5
9	Illogan Park	22	8	0	14	256	490	−234	3	3	40
10	Newquay Hornets	22	6	0	16	231	443	−212	2	2	29
11	Camborne School of Mines	22	5	0	17	271	635	−364	7	1	23	−5
12	Hayle	22	2	0	20	165	819	−654	1	4	8	−5
Points are awarded as follows: 4 points for a win; 2 points for a draw; 0 points for a loss; 1 point for scoring four tries; 1 point for losing by seven points or less; If teams are level at any stage, tiebreakers are applied in the following order: 1. Number of matches won 2. Difference between points for and against 3. Total number of points for 4. Aggregate number of points scored in matches between tied teams 5. Number of matches won excluding the first match, then the second and so on until the tie is settled
Pink background are relegation places. Updated: 2 January 2024

== 2021–22 ==
=== Participating teams and locations ===
Team	Ground	Capacity	Town/Village	Previous season
Bodmin	Clifden Park		Bodmin	5th
Camborne School of Mines	Memorial Park, Kernick Road		Penryn	4th
Helston	King George V Playing Field	2,500	Helston	Promoted from Cornwall 2 (runners-up)
Illogan Park	Paynters Lane Playing Field		Illogan	7th (not relegated)
Lankelly-Fowey	Lankelly Farm		Fowey	6th
Roseland	Philleigh Rugby Field		Philleigh	Promoted from Cornwall 2 (champions)
St Agnes	Enys Parc		St Agnes	3rd

Locations of the 2021–22 Cornwall League 1 teams

==== League table ====
2021–22 Cornwall League 1 Table
Pos	Team	Played	Won	Drew	Lost	For	Against	Diff	Try bonus	Loss bonus	Pts	Pts adj
1	Bodmin	12	10	0	2	371	161	210	9	2	51
2	Camborne School of Mines	12	8	1	3	335	320	15	8	0	42
3	Illogan Park	12	7	0	5	230	179	51	4	4	37
4	Helston	12	5	1	6	210	259	−49	3	3	28
5	Roseland	12	4	1	7	176	270	−94	2	3	23
6	Lankelly-Fowey	12	4	1	7	225	255	−30	4	0	19	−5
7	St Agnes	12	2	0	10	138	241	−103	2	3	8	−5
Points are awarded as follows: 4 points for a win; 2 points for a draw; 0 points for a loss; 1 point for scoring four tries; 1 point for losing by seven points or less; If teams are level at any stage, tiebreakers are applied in the following order: 1. Number of matches won 2. Difference between points for and against 3. Total number of points for 4. Aggregate number of points scored in matches between tied teams 5. Number of matches won excluding the first match, then the second and so on until the tie is settled
Pink background are relegation places. Updated: 7 June 2022

== 2020–21 ==
Due to the COVID-19 pandemic, the 2020–21 season was cancelled.

== 2019–20 ==
=== Participating teams and locations ===
Team	Ground	Capacity	Town/Village	Previous season
Bodmin	Clifden Park		Bodmin	3rd
Camborne School of Mines	Memorial Park, Kernick Road		Penryn	4th
Hayle	Memorial Park		Hayle, Cornwall	Relegated from Cornwall/Devon (12th)
Illogan Park	Paynters Lane Playing Field		Illogan	6th
Lankelly-Fowey	Lankelly Farm		Fowey	5th
Newquay Hornets	Newquay Sports Ground		Newquay	Runners up (lost playoff)
St Agnes	Enys Parc		St Agnes	Promoted from Cornwall 2 (champions)
St Just	Tregeseal		Tregeseal, St Just	Promoted from Cornwall 2 (runners up)

Locations of the 2019–20 Cornwall League 1 teams

==== League table ====
2019–2020 Cornwall League 1 Table
Final position	Team	Points (adjusted)	Pos	Team	Played	Won	Drew	Lost	For	Against	Diff	Try bonus	Loss bonus	Pts	Notes
1	Hayle	60	1	Hayle	14	12	1	1	534	172	362	10	0	60
2	Newquay Hornets	59	2	Newquay Hornets	13	11	0	2	417	152	265	10	1	55
3	St Agnes	41	3	St Agnes	14	9	0	5	248	165	83	3	0	41
4	Camborne School of Mines	40	4	Camborne School of Mines	13	8	1	4	241	126	115	5	1	36	−5
5	Bodmin	30	5	Bodmin	14	6	0	8	240	211	29	3	3	30
6	Lankelly-Fowey	20	6	Lankelly-Fowey	14	4	0	10	211	493	−282	4	0	20
7	Illogan Park	19	7	Illogan Park	14	2	0	12	238	354	−116	3	0	19
8	St Just	−4	8	St Just	14	0	0	14	92	548	−456	0	1	−4	−5
Points are awarded as follows: 4 points for a win; 2 points for a draw; 0 points for a loss; 1 point for scoring four tries; 1 point for losing by seven points or less; If teams are level at any stage, tiebreakers are applied in the following order: 1. Number of matches won 2. Difference between points for and against 3. Total number of points for 4. Aggregate number of points scored in matches between tied teams 5. Number of matches won excluding the first match, then the second and so on until the tie is settled
Green background are promotion places. Blue background is the play-off place. Pink background are relegation places. Updated: 10 August 2021 Source:

== 2018–19 ==
=== Participating teams and locations ===
Team	Ground	Capacity	Town/Village	Previous season
Bodmin	Clifden Park		Bodmin	Runners up (lost playoff)
Camborne School of Mines	Memorial Park, Kernick Road		Penryn	6th
Helston	King George V Playing Field	2,500	Helston	Promoted from Cornwall 2 (champions)
Illogan Park	Paynters Lane Playing Field		Illogan	7th
Lankelly-Fowey	Lankelly Farm		Fowey	Promoted from Cornwall 2 (runners up)
Newquay Hornets	Newquay Sports Ground		Newquay	3rd
Roseland	Philleigh Rugby Field		Philleigh	5th
Veor	Memorial Ground	500	Camborne	4th

Locations of the 2018–19 Cornwall League 1 teams

==== League table ====
2018–19 Cornwall League 1 Table
Pos	Team	Played	Won	Drew	Lost	For	Against	Diff	Try bonus	Loss bonus	Pts	Notes
1	Veor	14	13	0	1	561	190	371	10	0	63
2	Newquay Hornets	14	11	0	3	486	171	315	8	2	54
3	Bodmin	14	10	0	4	458	246	212	10	2	52
4	Camborne School of Mines	14	5	0	9	326	368	−42	6	2	28
5	Lankelly-Fowey	14	4	0	10	353	442	−89	7	3	26
6	Illogan Park	14	5	0	9	180	481	−301	4	0	24
7	Roseland	14	4	0	10	197	376	−179	3	1	20
8	Helston	14	4	0	10	152	439	−287	4	0	15	−5
Points are awarded as follows: 4 points for a win; 2 points for a draw; 0 points for a loss; 1 point for scoring four tries; 1 point for losing by seven points or less; If teams are level at any stage, tiebreakers are applied in the following order: 1. Number of matches won 2. Difference between points for and against 3. Total number of points for 4. Aggregate number of points scored in matches between tied teams 5. Number of matches won excluding the first match, then the second and so on until the tie is settled
Green background are promotion places. Blue background is the play-off place. Pink background are relegation places. Updated: 11 August 2021

== 2017–18 ==
The format was the same as the previous season with Cornwall 1 and Cornwall 2 playing in a fifteen team Tribute Cornwall League. The teams played each other once in the first phase and after Christmas the teams split into two leagues, with the top eight playing in Cornwall One and the remainder playing in Cornwall Two.

=== Phase 1 ===
==== Participating clubs ====
Team	Ground	Capacity	Town/Village	Previous season
Bodmin	Clifden Park		Bodmin	Relegated from Cornwall/Devon (12th)
Camborne School of Mines	Memorial Park, Kernick Road		Penryn	8th
Camelford	Lane End	500	Camelford	7th (Cornwall 2)
Helston	King George V Playing Field	2,500	Helston	5th
Illogan Park	Paynters Lane Playing Field		Illogan	2nd (Cornwall 2)
Lankelly-Fowey	Lankelly Farm		Fowey	1st (Cornwall 2)
Liskeard-Looe	Lux Park		Liskeard	3rd
Newquay Hornets	Newquay Sports Ground		Newquay	2nd
Perranporth	Ponsmere Valley		Perranporth	6th (Cornwall 2)
Redruth Albany	Trewirgie Road		Redruth	5th (Cornwall 2)
Roseland	Philleigh Rugby Field		Philleigh	7th
St Agnes	Enys Parc		St Agnes	6th
St Just	Tregeseal		St Just	4th (Cornwall 2)
Stithians	Playing Field		Stithians	3rd (Cornwall 2)
Veor	Memorial Ground	500	Camborne	4th

Locations of the 2017–18 Tribute Cornwall League teams

==== League table ====
To be completed

=== Phase 2 ===
==== League table ====
2017–18 Cornwall League 1 Table
Pos	Team	Played	Won	Drew	Lost	For	A	Diff	Try bonus	Loss bonus	Pts	Notes
1	Liskeard-Looe	14	14	0	0	567	69	498	9	0	68
2	Bodmin	14	10	1	3	331	164	167	7	1	52
3	Newquay Hornets	14	10	1	3	252	179	73	4	1	47
4	Veor	14	8	0	6	262	367	−105	4	1	38
5	Roseland	14	5	0	9	188	383	−195	1	1	22
6	Camborne School of Mines	14	3	0	11	184	437	−253	2	4	14	−5
7	Illogan Park	14	2	0	12	171	351	−180	1	3	12
8	St Agnes	14	3	0	11	122	127	−5	2	4	9	−10
Points are awarded as follows: 4 points for a win; 2 points for a draw; 0 points for a loss; 1 point for scoring four tries; 1 point for losing by seven points or less; If teams are level at any stage, tiebreakers are applied in the following order: 1. Number of matches won 2. Difference between points for and against 3. Total number of points for 4. Aggregate number of points scored in matches between tied teams 5. Number of matches won excluding the first match, then the second and so on until the tie is settled
Green background are promotion places. Blue background is the play-off place. Pink background are relegation places. Updated: 20 April 2021

== 2016–17 ==
For the first time Cornwall 1 and Cornwall 2 were amalgamated to create the Tribute Cornwall League with fifteen teams playing each other once in the first phase. After Christmas the teams split into two leagues with the top eight playing in Cornwall One and the remainder playing in Cornwall Two. Hayle won the Tribute Cornwall League before Christmas and the Cornwall 1 title with two matches to play, and were promoted to Cornwall/Devon for the following season (2017–18). Newquay Hornets came second and were due to play Torrington (from Devon 1) in the play-off for the third promotion place; Newquay declined to play the match and Torrington were promoted.

=== Phase 1 ===
==== Participating clubs ====
Locations of the 2016–17 Tribute Cornwall League teams

Team	Ground	Capacity	Town/Village	Previous season
Camborne School of Mines	Memorial Park, Kernick Road		Penryn	2nd
Camelford	Lane End	500	Camelford	3rd (Cornwall 2)
Hayle	Memorial Park		Hayle	Relegated from Cornwall/Devon (12th)
Helston	King George V Playing Field	2,500	Helston	6th
Illogan Park	Paynters Lane Playing Field		Illogan	5th
Lankelly-Fowey	Lankelly Farm		Fowey	5th (Cornwall 2)
Liskeard-Looe	Lux Park		Liskeard	4th
Newquay Hornets	Newquay Sports Ground		Newquay	Relegated from Cornwall/Devon (13th)
Perranporth	Ponsmere Valley		Perranporth	7th
Redruth Albany	Trewirgie Road		Redruth	6th (Cornwall 2)
Roseland	Philleigh Rugby Field		Philleigh	1st (Cornwall 2)
St Agnes	Enys Parc		St Agnes	8th
St Just	Tregeseal		St Just	2nd (Cornwall 2)
Stithians	Playing Field		Stithians	4th (Cornwall 2)
Veor	Memorial Ground (Note: Veor moved to the Memorial Ground at the start of the 2016–17 season having been given notice to leave original ground Wheal Berry.)	500	Camborne	3rd
Green background are the qualifying positions for Cornwall 1 (Phase 2).

==== League table ====
2016–17 Tribute Cornwall League Final Table (phase one)
Pos	Team	P	W	D	L	F	A	Diff	Try bonus	Loss bonus	Pts	Notes
1	Hayle	14	14	0	0	393	48	345	7	0	67
2	Liskeard-Looe	14	12	0	2	404	139	265	9	1	61
3	St Agnes	14	10	0	4	212	166	46	4	1	48
4	Newquay Hornets	14	13	0	1	474	108	366	7	1	47	13 pts deducted
5	Camborne School of Mines	14	9	0	5	454	168	286	8	2	42
6	Helston	14	7	0	7	223	199	24	4	2	37
7	Veor	14	11	0	3	421	158	263	8	0	33	19 pts deducted
8	Roselands	14	6	0	8	269	257	12	5	4	33
9	Perranporth	14	6	0	8	245	327	−82	4	1	30
10	Stithians	14	4	1	9	153	341	−188	2	1	21
11	Lankelly-Fowey	14	4	0	10	205	543	−338	3	1	20
12	St Just	14	2	0	12	93	454	−361	0	0	9
13	Illogan Park	13	3	0	10	125	330	−205	2	1	6	9 pts deducted
14	Camelford	14	1	0	13	51	245	−194	0	0	−16	20 pts deducted
15	Redruth Albany	13	1	1	11	51	290	−239	0	1	−18	11 pts deducted
Points are awarded as follows: 4 points for a win; 2 points for a draw; 0 points for a loss; 1 point for scoring four tries; 1 point for losing by seven points or less; If teams are level at any stage, tiebreakers are applied in the following order: 1. Number of matches won 2. Difference between points for and against 3. Total number of points for 4. Aggregate number of points scored in matches between tied teams 5. Number of matches won excluding the first match, then the second and so on until the tie is settled
Green background are the qualifying positions for Cornwall 1 (phase 2). Updated: 27 January 2017

=== Phase 2 ===
==== League table ====
2016–17 Cornwall League 1 Table
Pos	Team	P	W	D	L	F	A	Diff	Try bonus	Loss bonus	Pts	Notes
1	Hayle	14	11	2	1	539	68	471	9	1	59
2	Newquay Hornets	14	10	1	3	395	194	201	8	1	51
3	Liskeard-Looe	14	9	2	3	380	186	194	8	1	49
4	Veor	14	6	1	7	240	343	−103	3	3	32
5	Helston	14	6	0	8	271	357	−86	5	1	25
6	St Agnes	14	4	0	10	181	313	−132	1	3	20
7	Roseland	14	4	0	10	152	418	−266	1	0	17
8	Camborne School of Mines	14	3	0	11	165	444	−279	2	2	−7
Points are awarded as follows: 4 points for a win; 2 points for a draw; 0 points for a loss; 1 point for scoring four tries; 1 point for losing by seven points or less; If teams are level at any stage, tiebreakers are applied in the following order: 1. Number of matches won 2. Difference between points for and against 3. Total number of points for 4. Aggregate number of points scored in matches between tied teams 5. Number of matches won excluding the first match, then the second and so on until the tie is settled
Green background are promotion places. Blue background is the play-off place. Pink background are relegation places. Updated: 9 April 2017

==== Promotion play-off ====
Each season, the runners-up of Cornwall 1 and Devon 1, participate in a play-off for promotion to Cornwall/Devon. Newquay Hornets declined to play the match and Torrington were promoted.

== 2015–16 ==
The 2015–16 Cornwall League 1 consisted of eight teams; each team playing the others twice, home and away. The season started on 10 October 2015 and the last league matches were played on 16 April 2016. Lanner won the title, in only their second season in league rugby, following promotion last year from Cornwall League 2. Camborne School of Mines finished second and were due to play Topsham from Devon 1 for the remaining promotion place to the Cornwall/Devon League. The match did not take place and Topsham were promoted.

=== Participating clubs ===
Locations of the 2015–16 Cornwall 1 teams

Team	Ground	Town/Village	Previous season
Camborne School of Mines	Memorial Park, Kernick Road	Penryn	3rd
Helston	King George V Playing Field	Helston	6th
Illogan Park	Paynters Lane Playing Field	Illogan	4th
Lanner		Lanner	Promoted from Cornwall 2
Liskeard-Looe	Lux Park	Liskeard	Relegated from Cornwall/Devon
Perranporth	Ponsmere Valley	Perranporth	5th
St Agnes	Enys Parc	St Agnes	Promoted from Cornwall 2
Veor	Wheal Gerry	Camborne	2nd

=== League table ===
2015–16 Cornwall League 1 Table
Pos	Team	P	W	D	L	F	A	Diff	Try bonus	Loss bonus	Pts	Notes
1	Lanner	14	11	0	3	278	182	96	6	1	52
2	Camborne School of Mines	14	10	0	4	343	157	186	6	2	50
3	Veor	14	9	0	5	339	172	167	7	3	47
4	Liskeard-Looe	14	9	0	5	280	203	77	4	1	38	3 pts deducted
5	Illogan Park	14	9	0	5	246	256	−10	3	2	32	9 pts deducted
6	Helston	14	4	0	10	163	330	−167	2	1	19
7	Perranporth	14	4	0	10	154	299	−145	2	0	18
8	St Agnes	14	0	0	14	119	323	−204	1	2	−7	10 pts deducted
Points are awarded as follows: 4 points for a win; 2 points for a draw; 0 points for a loss; 1 point for scoring four tries; 1 point for losing by seven points or less; If teams are level at any stage, tiebreakers are applied in the following order: 1. Number of matches won 2. Difference between points for and against 3. Total number of points for 4. Aggregate number of points scored in matches between tied teams 5. Number of matches won excluding the first match, then the second and so on until the tie is settled
Green background are promotion places. Blue background is the play-off place. Pink background are relegation places. Updated: 18 April 2016

=== Promotion play-off ===
Each season, the runners-up of Cornwall 1 and Devon 1, participate in a play-off for promotion to Cornwall/Devon. Camborne School of Mines were due to play Topsham at a venue and date to be decided. The match was not played and Topsham were promoted.

== 2014–15 ==
The 2014–15 Cornwall League 1 consists of eight teams; each team playing the others twice, home and away. The season started on 4 October 2014 and the league matches were due to finish on 24 January 2015, but owing to postponements finished on 14 February. The champions, Newquay Hornets are promoted to Cornwall/Devon while the second place team, Veor lost 3 – 47 against Plymstock Albion Oaks, the runner-up of Devon 1, in a play-off for promotion to Cornwall/Devon. Roseland and Stithians are relegated to Cornwall 2.

=== Participating clubs ===
Team	Ground	Town/Village	Previous season
Camborne School of Mines	Memorial Park, Kernick Road	Penryn	3rd
Helston	King George V Playing Field	Helston	6th
Illogan Park	Paynters Lane Playing Field	Illogan	Promoted from Cornwall 2
Newquay Hornets	Newquay Sports Ground	Newquay	Relegated from Cornwall/Devon
Perranporth	Ponsmere Valley	Perranporth	4th
Roseland	Philleigh Rugby Field	Philleigh	7th
Stithians	Playing Field	Stithians	5th
Veor	Wheal Gerry	Camborne	Relegated from Cornwall/Devon

=== League table ===
2014–15 Cornwall League 1 Table
Pos	Team	P	W	D	L	F	A	Diff	Try bonus	Loss bonus	Pts	Notes
1	Newquay Hornets	14	14	0	0	567	78	489	11	0	69
2	Veor	14	10	0	4	394	186	208	8	1	50
3	Camborne School of Mines	14	8	1	5	451	273	178	9	2	40
4	Illogan Park	14	8	0	6	401	358	43	7	0	39
5	Perranporth	14	6	0	8	184	302	−118	2	0	27
6	Helston	14	4	1	9	229	511	−282	3	0	21
7	Roseland	14	2	0	12	186	485	−299	3	2	13
8	Stithians	14	3	0	11	208	427	−219	3	0	11	4pts deducted
Points are awarded as follows: 4 points for a win; 2 points for a draw; 0 points for a loss; 1 point for scoring four tries; 1 point for losing by seven points or less; If teams are level at any stage, tiebreakers are applied in the following order: 1. Number of matches won 2. Difference between points for and against 3. Total number of points for 4. Aggregate number of points scored in matches between tied teams 5. Number of matches won excluding the first match, then the second and so on until the tie is settled
Green background are promotion places. Blue background is the play-off place. There was no relegation this season. Updated: 21 April 2017

=== Promotion play-off ===
Each season, the runners-up of Cornwall 1 and Devon 1, participate in a play-off for promotion to Cornwall/Devon. Plymouth Albion Oaks beat the home team Veor 47 – 3.

Club	Played	Won	Drawn	Lost	Points for	Points against	Points diff	Try bonus	Loss bonus	Points
Plymstock Albion Oaks (P)	16	12	1	3	360	212	148	4	1	55
Veor	14	10	0	4	394	186	208	8	1	50

25 April 2015
14:30

Veor	3–47	Plymouth Albion Oaks

== 2013–14 ==
The 2013–14 Cornwall 1 kicked off on 28 September 2013 and was due to finish on 8 February 2014, but owing to postponements finished on 1 March. The league consisted of eight clubs, with each team playing the others twice; home and away. Liskeard-Looe were unbeaten winning thirteen of their fourteen matches, finished as champions and will next season play in Cornwall/Devon. The runner-up, Bodmin, beat the second placed team Totnes, from Devon 1 in a play-off for promotion. St Agnes are relegated to Cornwall 2.

=== Participating clubs ===
Team	Ground	Town/Village	Previous season
Bodmin	Clifden Park	Bodmin	Promoted from Cornwall 2
Camborne School of Mines	Memorial Park, Kernick Road	Penryn	Promoted from Cornwall 2
Helston	King George V Playing Field	Helston	5th
Liskeard-Looe	Lux Park	Liskeard	Relegated from Cornwall/Devon
Perranporth	Ponsmere Valley	Perranporth	4th
Roseland		Philleigh	6th
St Agnes	Enys Parc	St Agnes	3rd
Stithians	Playing Field	Stithians	2nd

=== League table ===
2013–14 Cornwall League 1 Table
Pos	Team	P	W	D	L	F	A	Diff	Try bonus	Loss bonus	Pts
1	Liskeard-Looe (P)	14	13	1	0	570	86	484	11	0	65
2	Bodmin (P)	14	9	1	4	396	227	169	8	2	48
3	Camborne School of Mines	14	9	1	4	282	199	83	5	2	45
4	Perranporth	14	7	0	7	291	351	−60	5	1	34
5	Stithians	14	6	0	8	194	315	−121	2	3	29
6	Helston	14	5	0	9	179	245	−66	2	2	24
7	Roseland	14	3	0	11	146	379	−233	1	2	15
8	St Agnes	14	2	1	11	147	403	−256	1	2	13
Points are awarded as follows: 4 points for a win; 2 points for a draw; 0 points for a loss; 1 point for scoring four tries; 1 point for losing by seven points or less; If teams are level at any stage, tiebreakers are applied in the following order: 1. Number of matches won 2. Difference between points for and against 3. Total number of points for 4. Aggregate number of points scored in matches between tied teams 5. Number of matches won excluding the first match, then the second and so on until the tie is settled
Green background is the promotion place. Blue background is the play-off place. Pink background are relegation places. Updated: 28 July 2015

=== Promotion play-off ===
Each season, the runners-up of Cornwall 1 and Devon 1, participate in a play-off for promotion to Cornwall/Devon. Plymouth Albion Oaks beat the home team Veor 47 – 3.

Club	Played	Won	Drawn	Lost	Points for	Points against	Points diff	Try bonus	Loss bonus	Points
Bodmin (P)	14	9	1	4	396	227	169	8	2	48
Totnes	16	10	1	5	311	290	21	4	1	47

25 April 2015
14:30

Bodmin	17–15	Totnes

Clifden Park

== 2012–13 ==
=== Participating clubs ===
Team	Ground	Town/Village	Previous season
Helston	King George V Playing Field	Helston	
Perranporth	Ponsmere Valley	Perranporth	Promoted from Cornwall 2
Roseland	Philleigh Rugby Field	Philleigh	
St Agnes	Enys Parc	St Agnes	Promoted from Cornwall 2
St Just	Tregeaseal	St Just	
Stithians	Playing Field	Stithians	
Veor	Wheal Gerry	Camborne	relegated from Cornwall/Devon

=== League table ===
2012–13 Cornwall League 1 Table
Pos	Team	P	W	D	L	F	A	Diff	Bonus	Pts	Notes
1	Veor	18	17	0	1	657	140	517	13	78	5 pts deducted
2	Stithians	18	11	1	6	457	210	247	12	59
3	St Agnes	18	9	0	9	404	306	98	9	46
4	Perranporth	18	9	0	9	346	403	−57	7	39	5 pts deducted
5	Helston	18	8	0	10	238	362	−124	6	39
6	Roseland	18	8	1	9	269	250	19	4	23	15 pts deducted
7	St Just	18	0	0	18	77	777	−700	1	−4	5 pts deducted
Points are awarded as follows: 4 points for a win; 2 points for a draw; 0 points for a loss; 1 point for scoring four tries; 1 point for losing by seven points or less; If teams are level at any stage, tiebreakers are applied in the following order: 1. Number of matches won 2. Difference between points for and against 3. Total number of points for 4. Aggregate number of points scored in matches between tied teams 5. Number of matches won excluding the first match, then the second and so on until the tie is settled
Green background is the promotion place. Blue blackground is the play-off place. Red background is the relegation place.

== 2011–12 ==
For the previous two season Cornwall 1 and Cornwall 2 were amalgamated, this season the leagues' returned to their original format with the re-introduction of Cornwall 2. Cornwall 1 was reduced to seven teams playing each other three times to make eighteen games each.

Saltash, the champions, are promoted to the Cornwall/Devon League for season 2012–13. Helston played against the runner–up from Devon 1, losing the play-off for a place in the Cornwall/Devon League. There was no relegation.

== 2010–11 ==
Veor, the champions, are promoted to the Cornwall/Devon for season 2011–12. The runner-up, Pirates Amateurs beat Wessex (Devon 1) 29 – 20 in the play-off and were also promoted. St Day, Perranporth, Illogan Park, St Agnes, and Redruth Albany were relegated to the re-formed Cornwall 2. Lankelly-Fowey withdrew during the season and their results expunged from the table.

== 2009–10 ==
For two seasons, 2009–10 and 2010–11, the size of the league was increased to twelve teams by amalgamating with Cornwall League 2. Roseland, the champions, are promoted to Cornwall/Devon for season 2010–11. Veor, the runner-up lost to Honiton in the promotion play-off and continued to play in the Tribute Cornwall League.

== 2008–09 ==
Stithians as champions, were promoted to Cornwall/Devon for season 2009–10. With an increase from twelve to sixteen teams in the aforementioned league, St Austell and Liskeard-Looe were also promoted. The two Cornwall leagues amalgamated for the following season and Camborne School of Mines, Illogan Park, Lankelly-Fowey, Redruth Albany, St Agnes, St Day and Veor joined the remaining teams for 2009–10.

== 1989–90 ==
=== League table ===
1989–90 Courage Cornwall League One Table
	Club	Played	Won	Drawn	Lost	Points for	Points against	Points diff	Points
1	Hayle	10	9	0	1	171	76	95	18
2	Liskeard-Looe	10	7	1	2	163	124	39	15
3	St Austell	10	6	2	2	110	76	34	14
4	Saltash	10	6	0	4	184	122	62	12
5	Stithians	10	5	1	4	93	92	1	11
6	Bodmin	10	4	2	4	112	104	8	10
7	Veor	10	5	0	5	119	116	3	10
8	Bude	10	3	1	6	116	117	−1	7
9	Redruth Albany	10	2	1	7	112	157	−45	5
10	Helston	10	2	1	7	91	141	−50	5
11	St Just	10	0	3	7	80	226	−146	3
Points are awarded as follows: 1. 2 pts for a win 2. 1 pt for a draw 3. 0 pts for a loss
Green background is the promotion place. Pink background are relegation places. Updated: 15 August 2021

== 1988–89 ==
=== League table ===
1988–89 Courage Cornwall League One Table
	Club	Played	Won	Drawn	Lost	Points for	Points against	Points diff	Points
1	Wadebridge Camels	10	8	1	1	198	75	123	17
2	St Austell	10	7	1	2	194	68	126	15
3	Liskeard-Looe	10	6	2	2	153	57	96	14
4	Saltash	10	6	0	4	118	81	37	12
5	Helston	10	5	1	4	170	78	92	11
6	Bude	10	4	2	4	147	82	63	10
7	Redruth Albany	10	4	2	4	82	174	−92	10
8	Bodmin	10	4	0	6	128	143	−15	8
9	Veor	10	3	1	6	90	104	−14	7
10	Lankelly Fowey	10	2	0	8	55	349	−294	4
11	St Agnes	10	0	2	8	87	211	−124	2
Points are awarded as follows: 1. 2 pts for a win 2. 1 pt for a draw 3. 0 pts for a loss
Green background is the promotion place. Pink background are relegation places. Updated: 21 April 2021

== Original teams ==
When league rugby began in 1987 this division contained the following teams:

- Bodmin
- Bude
- Helston
- Illogan Park
- Liskeard-Looe
- Redruth Albany
- Saltash
- St Agnes
- St Just
- Stithians
- Wadebridge Camels

== Cornwall League 1 honours ==
=== Cornwall League 1 (1987–1993) ===
The original Cornwall 1 (sponsored by Courage) was a tier 9 league with promotion to Cornwall/Devon and relegation to Cornwall 2.

Cornwall League 1
Season	No of teams	Champions	Runners-up	Relegated team(s)	Ref
1987–88	11	Illogan Park	Wadebridge Camels	Stithians, St Just	
1988–89	11	Wadebridge Camels	St Austell	St Agnes, Lankelly-Fowey	
1989–90	11	Hayle	Liskeard-Looe	St Just, Helston, Redruth Albany	
1990–91	11	Saltash	Falmouth	St Agnes, Roseland	
1991–92	11	Liskeard-Looe	Bude	Wadebridge Camels, Helston	
1992–93	9	Veor	Falmouth	Camborne School of Mines	
Green backgrounds are promotion places.

=== Cornwall League 1 (1993–96) ===
The creation of National 5 South for the 1993–94 season meant that the Cornwall League 1 dropped to become a tier 10 league. Promotion was to Cornwall/Devon and relegation to Cornwall 2. The league continued to be sponsored by Courage.

Cornwall League 1
Season	No of teams	Champions	Runners-up	Relegated team(s)	Ref
1993–94	11	Saltash	Falmouth	St Just, Redruth Albany	
1994–95	11	St Austell	Liskeard-Looe	Illogan Park, Bodmin	
1995–96	11	Bude	Falmouth	Wadebridge Camels, St Day	
Green backgrounds are promotion places.

=== Cornwall League 1 (1996–2009) ===
The cancellation of National 5 South at the end of the 1995–96 season saw Cornwall League 1 return to being a tier 9 division. Promotion continued to Cornwall/Devon and relegation to Cornwall 2. From the 2008–09 season onward the league was sponsored by Tribute.

Cornwall League 1
Season	No of teams	Champions	Runners-up	Relegated team(s)	Ref
1996–97	10	Falmouth	Newquay Hornets	Redruth Albany	
1997–98	10	Newquay Hornets	Wadebridge Camels	Liskeard-Looe, St Agnes	
1998–99	9	St Just	Saltash	Veor	
1999–00	9	Perranporth	Saltash	Redruth Albany	
2000–01	9	Saltash	Wadebridge Camels	St Day	
2001–02	9	Bude	Mounts Bay	Callington	
2002–03	9	Falmouth	Mounts Bay	Helston, St Day	
2003–04	8	Liskeard-Looe	Perranporth	St Agnes	
2004–05	8	St Austell	Saltash	Helston	
2005–06	8	Perranporth	Newquay Hornets	St Just, Redruth Albany	
2006–07	8	Newquay Hornets	Liskeard-Looe	Illogan Park, Camborne School of Mines	
2007–08	9	Saltash	Helston	No relegation	
2008–09	8 (Note: Illogan Park withdrew from the league at the start of the season due to having only fourteen players in their squad.)	Stithians	St Austell (Note: 3rd place Liskeard-Looe also promoted.)	No relegation	
Green backgrounds are promotion places.

=== Cornwall League (2009–2011) ===
For the 2009–10 season Cornwall 1 and Cornwall 2 were combined into a single division at tier 9 of the league system. Promotion was to Cornwall/Devon and there was no relegation.

Cornwall League
Season	No of teams	Champions	Runners-up	Relegated team(s)	Ref
2009–10	12	Roseland	Veor	No relegation	
2010–11	11 (Note: Lankelly-Fowey withdrew during the league season.)	Veor	Pirates Amateurs	Multiple teams (Note: The splitting of the Cornwall League back into Cornwall 1 and Cornwall 2 at the end of the season meant that five clubs were relegated. They were St Day, Perranporth, Illogan Park, St Agnes and Redruth Albany.)	
Green backgrounds are promotion places.

=== Cornwall League 1 (2011–2016) ===
The splitting of the Cornwall League back into two separate divisions, saw Cornwall 1 remain at tier 9 of the league system. Promotion continued to Cornwall/Devon and relegation was once again to Cornwall 2.

Cornwall League 1
Season	No of teams	Champions	Runners-up	Relegated team(s)	Ref
2011–12	7	Saltash	Helston	No relegation	
2012–13	7	Veor	Stithians	St Just	
2013–14	8	Liskeard-Looe	Bodmin	St Agnes	
2014–15	8	Newquay Hornets	Veor	Roseland, Stithians	
2015–16	8	Lanner	Camborne School of Mines	No relegation (Note: There was no relegation as Cornwall 1 and Cornwall 2 were combined to form a single division in the first half of the following season.)	
Green backgrounds are promotion places.

=== Cornwall League 1 (2016–2018) ===
The 2016–17 season saw the Cornwall leagues restructured. For the first half of the season, all the clubs from Cornwall 1 and Cornwall 2 play in a single tier 9 division. In the second half of the season league the teams divided into Cornwall 1 and Cornwall 2 leagues based on their league positions. Promotion continued to Cornwall/Devon and there was no relegation.

Cornwall League 1
Season	No of teams	Champions	Runners-up	Relegated team(s)	Ref
2016–17	8	Hayle	Newquay Hornets	No relegation	
2017–18	8	Liskeard-Looe	Bodmin	St Agnes	
Green backgrounds are promotion places.

=== Cornwall League 1 (2018–2022) ===
The 2018–19 season saw Cornwall 1 revert to being a tier 9 league with promotion to Cornwall/Devon and relegation to Cornwall 2.

Cornwall League 1
Season	No of teams	Champions	Runners-up	Relegated team(s)	Ref
2018–19	8	Veor	Newquay Hornets	Helston, Roseland	
2019–20	8	Hayle	Newquay Hornets	St Just, Illogan Park	
2020–21	Cancelled due to COVID-19 pandemic in the United Kingdom.				
2021–22	7	Bodmin	Camborne School of Mines	Roseland, Lankelly-Fowey and St Agnes	
Green backgrounds are promotion places.

=== Counties 2 Cornwall (2022– ) ===
From 2022 to 2023 season Cornwall 1 has been renamed Counties 2 Cornwall and is a tier 8 league with twelve teams participating. Promotion is to Counties 1 Western West and relegation to Counties 3 Cornwall.

Counties 2 Cornwall
Season	No of teams	Champions	Runners-up	Relegated team(s)	Ref
2022–23	12	St Ives	Saltash	Hayle	
2023–24	12	Redruth II	Saltash	Illogan Park and Camborne School of Mines	
2024–25	11	Saltash	Helston	Hayle (11th)	
2025–26	12	Camborne II	Helston	Bodmin (12th)	

== Number of league titles ==
- Updated to the end of 2025–26

#	Team	Champions	Runner-up
6	Saltash	1991, 1994, 2001, 2008, 2012, 2025	1999, 2000, 2005, 2023, 2024
4	Liskeard-Looe	1992, 2004, 2014, 2018	1990, 1995, 2007 (Note: 2009 – 3rd place also promoted.)
4	Veor	1993, 2011, 2013, 2019	2010, 2015
3	Newquay Hornets	1998, 2007, 2015	1997, 2006, 2017, 2019, 2020
3	Hayle	1990, 2017, 2020	
2	Falmouth	1997, 2003	1991, 1993, 1994, 1996
2	St Austell	1995, 2005	1989, 2009
2	Bude	1996, 2002	1992
2	Perranporth.	2000, 2006	2004
1	Wadebridge Camels	1989	1988, 1998, 2001
1	Bodmin	2022	2014, 2018
1	Stithians	2009	2013
1	Illogan Park	1988	
1	St Just	1999	
1	Roseland	2010	
1	Lanner	2016	
1	St Ives	2023	
1	Redruth II	2024	
1	Camborne II	2026	
0	Helston		2008, 2012, 2025, 2026
0	Mount's Bay		2002, 2003
0	Camborne School of Mines		2016, 2022
0	Pirate Amateurs		2011

- Green background are promotions.

== Promotion play-offs ==
Since the 2000–01 season there has been a play-off between the runners-up of Cornwall League 1 and Devon League 1 for the third and final promotion place to Cornwall/Devon. The team with the superior league record has home advantage in the tie. At the end of the 2019–20 season the Devon League 1 teams have been the most successful with thirteen wins to the Cornwall League 1 teams five; and the home team has won promotion on twelve occasions compared to the away teams six.

Cornwall League 1 v Devon League 1 promotion play-off results
Season	Home team	Score	Away team	Venue	Attendance
2000–01	Wadebridge Camels (C)	53–17	Old Technicians (D)	Molesworth Field, Wadebridge, Cornwall	
2001–02	Mounts Bay (C)	14–17	Teignmouth (D)	Mennaye Field, Penzance, Cornwall	
2002–03	Old Plymothian & Mannamedian (D)	8–20	Mounts Bay (C)	King George V Playing Fields, Plymstock, Plymouth, Devon	
2003–04	Old Plymothian & Mannamedian (D) (Note: The result of the 2003–04 promotion play-off between Old Plymothian & Mannamedian and Perranporth is not listed on the RFU website, although Old Plymothian & Mannamedian would have had home advantage as they had a better league record than Perranporth. We do, however, know that Old Plymothian & Mannamedian won this game as they were in Cornwall/Devon the next season while Perranporth were not.)		Perranporth (C)	King George V Playing Fields, Plymstock, Plymouth, Devon	
2004–05	Honiton (D)	49–20	Saltash (C)	Allhallows Playing Field, Honiton, Devon	
2005–06	Cullompton (D)	28–6	Newquay Hornets (C)	Stafford Park, Cullompton, Devon	
2006–07	Bideford (D)	23–18	Liskeard-Looe (C)	King George's Fields, Bideford, Devon	
2007–08	Helston (C)	0–24	Plymstock Albion Oaks (D)	King George V Playing Field, Helston, Cornwall	
2008–09	No promotion play-off. (Note: Due to the restructuring of the English league system by the RFU for the 2009–10 season there would be no 2008-09 promotion playoff between the league runners up in Cornwall 1 and Devon 1 with the champions and runners up from each league going up automatically.)				
2009–10	Honiton (D)	43–12	Veor (C)	Allhallows Playing Field, Honiton, Devon	
2010–11	Pirates Amateurs (C)	29–20	Wessex (D)	Mennaye Field, Penzance, Cornwall	400
2011–12	Helston (C)	19–20	Old Plymothian & Mannamedian (D)	King George V Playing Field, Helston, Cornwall	
2012–13	Stithians (C)	17–12	Plymstock Albion Oaks (D)	Church Road, Stithians, Cornwall	
2013–14	Bodmin (C)	17–15	Totnes (D)	Clifden Park, Bodmin, Cornwall	355
2014–15	Veor (C)	3–47	Plymstock Albion Oaks (D)	Wheal Gerry, Camborne, Cornwall	
2015–16	Topsham (D)	HWO (Note: Topsham were automatically promoted at the end of the 2015–16 season as Camborne School of Mines did not want to be promoted.)	Camborne School of Mines (C)	Bonfire Field, Topsham, Devon	N/A
2016–17	Newquay Hornets (C)	AWO (Note: Torrington were automatically promoted at the end of the 2016–17 season as Newquay Hornets did not want to be promoted.)	Torrington (D)	Newquay Sports Ground, Newquay, Cornwall	N/A
2017–18	Topsham (D)	67–3	Bodmin (C)	Bonfire Field, Topsham, Devon	
2018–19	Exeter Athletic (D)	29–3	Newquay Hornets (C)	Bravelands, Clyst St Mary, Devon	
2019–20	Cancelled due to COVID-19 pandemic in the United Kingdom. Best ranked runner up – Newquay Hornets (C) – promoted instead.				
2020–21	Cancelled due to COVID-19 pandemic in the United Kingdom.				
2021–22	Cancelled due to league reorganisation.				
Green background is the promoted team. C = Cornwall League 1 and D = Devon League 1.

== Sponsorship ==
The Cornwall One League was part of the Courage Clubs Championship and sponsored by Courage Brewery from the first season, 1987–88 to season 1996–97. The league was unsponsored until season 2007–08 when St Austell Brewery sponsored South-west based leagues under the Tribute Ale label.

== See also ==
- South West Division RFU
- Cornwall RFU
- English rugby union system
- Rugby union in Cornwall
