= 2008–09 Cornwall League 1 =

Tribute Cornwall 1
- Countries: England
- Champions: Stithians
- Runners-up: St Austell
- Promoted: Stithians, St Austell and Liskeard-Looe
- Relegated: None

The Cornwall League 1 2008–09 was a full season of rugby union within Cornwall League 1.

== Team changes ==
Stithians as Champions, were promoted to the Tribute Cornwall/Devon League for season 2009–10. With an increase from 12 to 16 teams in the aforementioned league, St Austell and Liskeard-Looe were also promoted. The two Cornwall leagues will combine for next season and Camborne School of Mines, Illogan Park, Lankelly-Fowey, Redruth Albany, St Agnes, St Day and Veor will join the remaining teams for the following season.

== Table ==
Cornwall League 2008-09
Pos	Team	Pld	W	D	L	PF	PA	PD	Pts
1	Stithians (P)	14	11	2	1	549	95	+454	24
2	St Austell (P)	14	11	2	1	425	90	+335	24
3	Liskeard-Looe (P)	14	12	0	2	351	60	+291	24
4	Roseland	14	8	0	6	128	302	−174	16
5	Helston	14	6	0	8	181	313	−132	12
6	Bodmin	14	4	0	10	205	246	−41	8
7	Perranporth	14	2	0	12	116	435	−319	2 (Note: 2 points deducted)
8	St Just	14	0	0	14	40	454	−414	−2

Rules for classification: Points are awarded as follows: 2 points for a win, 1 points for a draw, 0 points for a loss
(P) Promoted
Notes:

Illogan Park withdrew at the start of the season after 14 players left the club
