= Penryn RFC =

English rugby union club, based in Cornwall

(England) Penryn RFC
- Full name: Penryn Rugby Football Club
- Union: Cornwall RFU
- Nickname: The Borough
- Founded: 1872; 154 years ago
- Location: Penryn, Cornwall, England
- Ground: Memorial Ground, (Capacity: 4,000 (200 seats))
- Chairman: Matthew Gray
- President: Tim Nicholls
- Captain: James Salisbury
- League: Counties 1 Western West
- 2024–25: 9th
Team kit

Official website
- www.penrynrugby.co.uk

Penyrn RFC is a Cornish rugby union club based in the town of Penryn, and is the oldest club side in the county having been formed in 1872. The club currently has two senior men's teams (the seconds are known as the Saracens) as well as a ladies team, colts, and multiple mini/youth sides (male and female). Nicknamed "The Borough" the club's colours are black and red. The men's first team play in Counties 1 Western West - a league at level 7 of the English rugby union system - having been promoted from Cornwall/Devon as champions at the end of the 2018–19 season. They enjoy a rivalry with neighbours, Falmouth RFC.

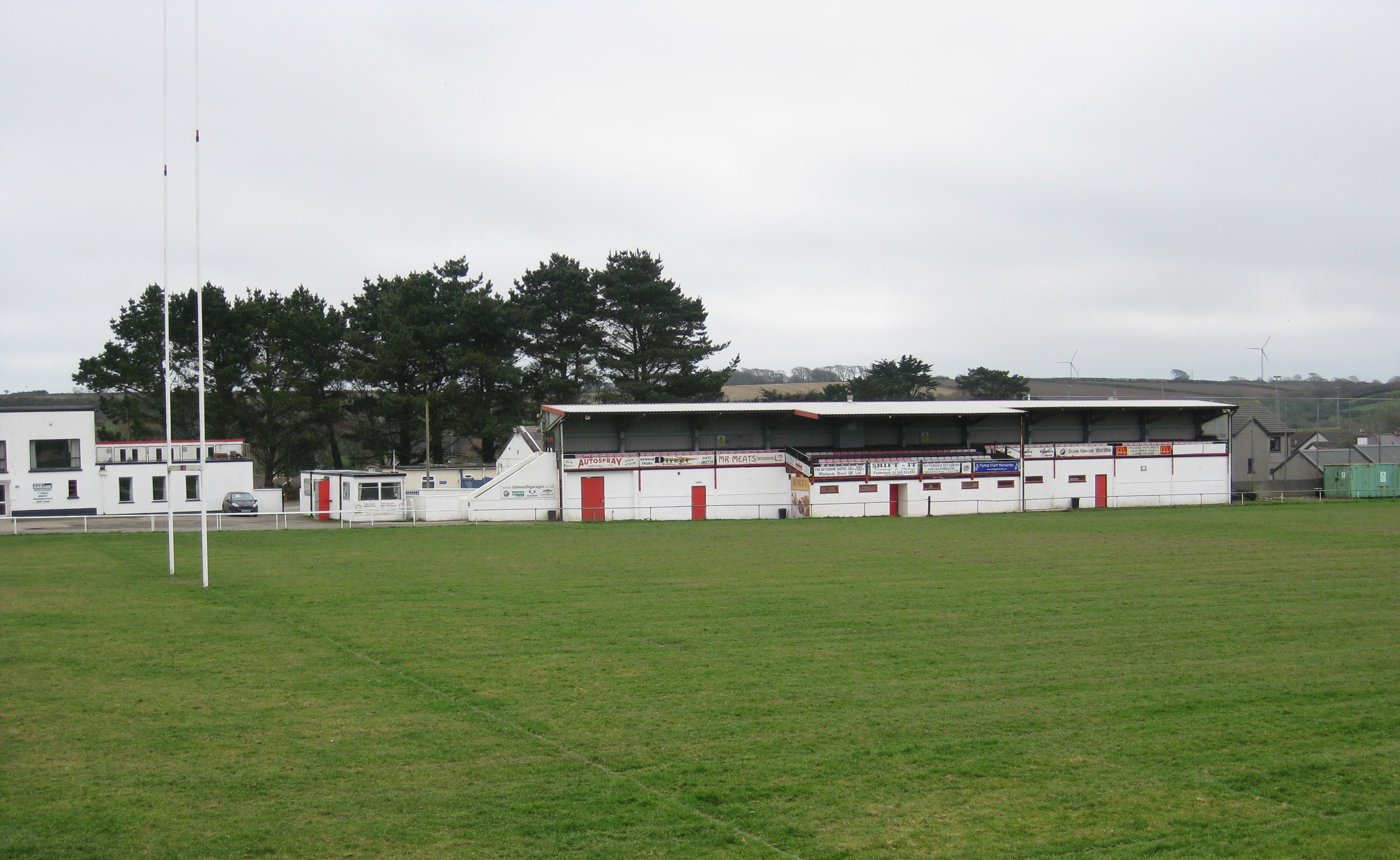
The Memorial Ground, home of Penryn RFC

== History ==
=== Cornish dominance ===
Formed in 1872, Penryn are the oldest club side in Cornwall. The 1960s and 1970s were the glory days for the club as they dominated domestic rugby. This period of dominance began during the 1964–65 season when the club claimed a hat-trick of titles including the South West Merit Table, the Cornwall Knock-out Cup and the Cornwall Sevens Cup. In 1968 they claimed the inaugural Cornwall Cup when they defeated Redruth 5–0 at the Recreation Ground in nearby Falmouth. Between 1968 and 1975, Penryn appeared in six finals, winning the cup five times which included sharing the 1970 cup after a 7–7 draw with St Ives (who also enjoyed great success during the early years of the cup). The glory days would not last forever and the 1975 final victory over Penzance & Newlyn would be the club's fifth and last Cornwall Cup title, as they began to be overtaken by other clubs in the region such as Redruth and Camborne.

=== League rugby ===
The advent of the Courage leagues in 1987–88 saw Penryn placed in Courage Cornwall/Devon, a regional league ranked at tier 8 of the new league system. Penryn started league rugby well, winning successive league titles in 1989 and 1990 and gaining promotion to South West 2. In 1992 the club gained a third promotion in five seasons when they went up to South West Division 1 – which at tier 5 is the highest league ranking the club have achieved in its history. Early success in the league was counteracted with relegation in 1993 after just one season in South West Division 1. The club would stabilize in South West 2 for the rest of the 1990s but as they moved into the millennium they were relegated to Western Counties West in 2001. Two years later Penryn had one of their best seasons of recent memory as they won all 22 league games in Western Counties West on the way to claiming the title and promotion, scoring over 1,000 points in the process. The club retained momentum the following season as they finished second in South West 2 West, qualifying for a promotion play-off which they won 23–19, away to South West 2 East runner-up Swanage and Wareham.

The 2005–06 season saw Penryn in South West Division 1 which at tier 5 was the highest league ranking they had achieved since 1993. Although Penryn were competitive in the division, taking place in a furious relegation battle, they ended up going down on points difference (for/against) in 10th place, despite being tied on league points with relegation rivals, Clevedon and Oxford Harlequins. As is sometimes the case with a relegated team, Penryn struggled the following season and went down for the second year running, after a poor league campaign that saw only 2 wins. The slump was halted in 2009 when Penryn won the Tribute Cornwall/Devon title, following up with a second promotion in 2011 when they won Tribute Western Counties West. Life in Tribute South West 1 West was short lived, however, and Penryn were relegated at the end of the 2011-12 season. The 2015–16 season was a disappointing one for the club as they were relegated from Tribute Western Counties West, falling back down to Tribute Cornwall/Devon. They did have a chance of silverware at the end of the season but lost heavily to a very strong Camborne in the final of the Cornwall Cup held at Tregorrick Park in St Austell. The club finished their first season back in Cornwall/Devon League in fifth place at the end of the 2016–17 season after relegation from Western Counties West.

At the end of the 2018–19 season Penryn were promoted as champions of Cornwall/Devon back into Western Counties West.

== Season summary ==
Season	League			National Cup(s)		County Cup(s)	
Season	Competition/Level	Position	Points	Competition	Performance	Competition	Performance
1987–88	Cornwall/Devon (8)	3rd	17				
1988–89	Cornwall/Devon (8)	1st (promoted)	18				
1989–90	Western Counties (7)	1st (promoted)					
1990–91	South West 2 (6)						
1991–92	South West 2 (6)	3rd (promoted)					
1992–93	South West 1 (5)	13th (relegated)					
1993–94	South West 2 West (6)						
1994–95	South West 2 West (6)						
1995–96	South West 2 West (6)	4th	14				
1996–97	South West 2 West (6)	6th	22				
1997–98	South West 2 West (6)	11th	8				
1998–99	South West 2 West (6)	11th	15				
1999–00	South West 2 West (6)	8th	16				
2000–01	South West 2 West (6)	12th (relegated)	6	NPI Intermediate Cup	6th Round	Cornwall Cup	2nd Round
2001–02	Western Counties West (7)	2nd (lost playoff)	38	RFU Intermediate Cup	4th Round	Cornwall Cup	Runners up
2002–03	Western Counties West (7)	1st (promoted)	44	Powergen Cup	1st Round	Cornwall Cup	2nd Round
2003–04	South West 2 West (6)	2nd (promoted via playoff)	31	Powergen Intermediate Cup	3rd Round	Cornwall Cup	Semi-finals
2004–05	South West 1 (5)	7th	20	Powergen Cup	1st Round	Cornwall Cup	Runners up
2005–06	South West 1 (5)	10th (relegated)	14	Powergen Trophy	2nd Round	Cornwall Cup	2nd Round
2006–07	South West 2 West (6)	11th (relegated)	1	RFU Intermediate Cup	1st Round	Cornwall Cup	1st Round
2007–08	Western Counties West (7)	12th (relegated)	0	EDF Energy Senior Vase	2nd Round	Cornwall Cup	1st Round
2008–09	Cornwall/Devon (8)	1st (promoted)	36	EDF Energy Senior Vase	1st Round		
2009–10	Western Counties West (7)	6th	29			Cornwall Cup	1st Round
2010–11	Western Counties West (7)	1st (promoted)	103 (Note: The 2010–11 season would see the introduction of bonus points into lower league English rugby union (tier 6 and below).)			Cornwall Cup	Semi-finals
2011–12	South West 1 West (6)	12th (relegated)	45				
2012–13	Western Counties West (7)	5th	79				
2013–14	Western Counties West (7)	6th	65	RFU Intermediate Cup	4th Round		
2014–15	Western Counties West (7)	11th	40	RFU Intermediate Cup	4th Round	Cornwall Cup	Semi-finals
2015–16	Western Counties West (7)	13th (relegated)	38			Cornwall Cup	Runners up
2016–17	Cornwall Devon (8)	5th	71			Cornwall Cup	2nd Round
2017–18	Cornwall Devon (8)	3rd	108			Cornwall Cup	2nd Round
2018–19	Cornwall Devon (8)	1st (promoted)	113	RFU Senior Vase	Semi-finals (SW)	Cornwall Cup	Quarter-finals
2019–20	Western Counties West (7)	6th	74.10 (Note: The season was postponed and ultimately cancelled due to the COVID-19 pandemic in the United Kingdom with Penryn sitting in 6th, having played 22 games and gained 65 points. The remaining games were calculated on a 'best playing record formula', with Penryn remaining in 6th place with 74.10 points.)			Cornwall Cup	
2020–21	Western Counties West (7)						
Green background stands for either league champions (with promotion) or cup winners. Blue background stands for promotion without winning league or losing cup finalists. Pink background stands for relegation.

== Honours ==
- South West Merit Table champions: 1965
- Cornwall Knock-out Cup winners: 1965
- Cornwall Sevens Cup winners: 1965
- Cornwall Cup winners (5): 1968, 1970 (shared), 1972, 1973, 1975
- South-west promotion play-off (east v west) winners: 2003–04
- Tribute Cornwall/Devon champions (3): 1988–89, 2008–09, 2018–19
- Tribute Western Counties West champions (3): 1989–90, 2002–03, 2010–11

== Notable former players ==
- Roger Hosen – born in Mabe he started career with Penryn before going to play for a number of clubs including Northampton Saints, gaining 10 caps for England. As well as playing rugby union he was also a keen cricketer, representing Cornwall.
- Ken Plummer – Penryn born winger who played for the club as well as Bristol and Welsh side Newport. Went on to gain 4 caps for England.
- Vic Roberts – played part of his career with Penryn. Gained 16 caps for England as well as being selected for the British and Irish Lions tour of 1950.
- (England) Adryan Winnan – Penryn born full-back who started his career with the club. Went on to play Premiership rugby for Saracens as well as appearing for the Cornish Pirates late in his career.
- Tom Voyce – Truro born player whose position was full-back or wing and who started his career with the minis at Penryn. Went on to play in the Premiership with the likes of Bath and Wasps as well as gaining 9 caps for England.
- Hugh Vyvyan – spent a season with Penryn in the 90s. Went on to forge a Premiership Premiership career playing at lock for Newcastle Falcons and Saracens, which included a solitary international cap for England.

== See also ==
- Rugby union in Cornwall
