= 2009–10 Cornwall League 1 =

Tribute Cornwall 1
- Countries: England
- Champions: Roseland
- Runners-up: Veor

The Cornwall League 1 2009–10 was a full season of rugby union within Cornwall League 1.

== Team changes ==
Roseland, as Champions, were promoted to the Tribute Cornwall/Devon League for season 2010-11. In the play-off for promotion to the Cornwall/Devon league, Veor lost to Honiton (12 - 43) and remained in the Tribute Cornwall League for the following season.

== Table ==
Tribute Cornwall League 2009-10
Pos	Team	Pld	W	D	L	PF	PA	PD	Pts
1	Roseland (P)	22	20	1	1	747	272	+475	41
2	Veor	22	19	0	3	579	196	+383	36 (Note: 2 points deducted)
3	Bodmin	22	17	0	5	610	248	+362	34
4	Perranporth	21	12	1	8	401	209	+192	21 (Note: 4 points deducted)
5	Redruth Albany	22	10	0	12	346	402	−56	18
6	Illogan Park	21	9	0	12	231	358	−127	18
7	Camborne School of Mines	21	12	2	7	575	364	+211	16 (Note: 10 points deducted)
8	St Just	21	8	0	13	204	464	−260	16
9	St Day	21	8	0	13	221	339	−118	14
10	St Agnes	22	6	1	15	351	420	−69	13
11	Helston	21	4	1	16	187	465	−278	9
12	Lankelly-Fowey	22	1	0	21	117	832	−715	0

Rules for classification: Points are awarded as follows: 2 pts for a win, 1 pt for a draw, 0 pts for a defeat, 2 pts deducted for failing to fulfil a fixture
(P) Promoted

=== Play-off ===
8 May 2010

Honiton	43 - 12	Veor
Try: L. Johns, S. Nex, N. Guilbert, J. Barratt, J. Rice, C Sampson. Con: B. Webber (5); Drop: N. Guilbert		Try: S. Sarah, J. Williams; Con: A.N. Other

Alhallows, Honiton
