= Tregeseal =

Hamlet in Cornwall, England

Coordinates: 50.128549°N 5.679488°W

Tregeseal: Cornish: Tregashel
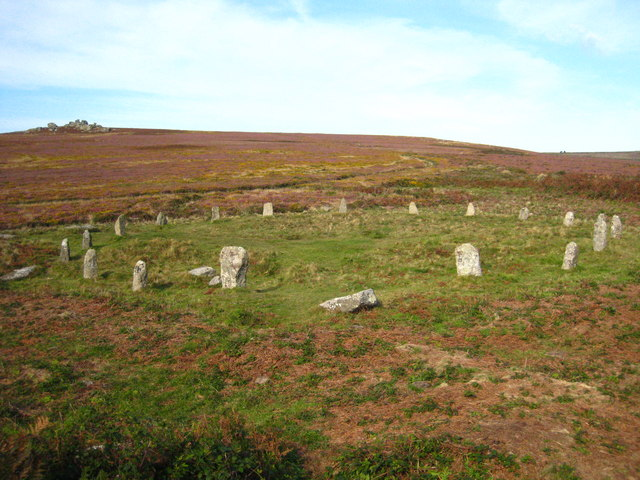
- Tregeseal stone circle (2009)

- Location within Cornwall
- OS grid reference: SW371318
  - London: 258.28 mi (415.66 km)
- Civil parish: St Just
- Unitary authority: Cornwall
- Shire county: Cornwall
- Ceremonial county: Cornwall
- Region: South West
- Country: England
- Sovereign state: United Kingdom
- Post town: PENZANCE
- Postcode district: TR19
- Dialling code: 01736
- Police: Devon and Cornwall
- Fire: Cornwall
- Ambulance: South Western
- UK Parliament: St Ives

Tregeseal (from Cornish: Tregashel, meaning "Catihael's settlement") is a hamlet in a valley 0.72 miles (1.16 km) northeast of the town of St Just, Cornwall, UK and is within the parish of St Just. Nearby is Tregeseal East stone circle grid reference SW 38236 31869. Tregeseal lies within the Cornwall Area of Outstanding Natural Beauty (AONB); almost a third of Cornwall has AONB designation, with the same status and protection as a National Park.

== Sport and Leisure ==
=== Rugby ===
St Just Rugby Football Club, established in 1967, are situated on the southern side of the hamlet on New Road. The club competes in the Counties 3 Tribute, South West Division.
