= RFU Senior Vase =

English rugby union competition

- Current season or competition: 2018–19 RFU Senior Vase
- Sport: Rugby union
- Instituted: 2006; 20 years ago
- Number of teams: Level 8 of English rugby
- Nations: England (RFU)
- Holders: Honiton (1st title) (2018-19)
- Website: England Rugby
- Related competition: Intermediate Cup, Junior Vase

The RFU Senior Vase is a rugby union national knockout cup competition in England run by the Rugby Football Union, which has been competed for since the 2006–07 season. It is contested for by teams at level 8 of the English rugby union system, with only 1st XV sides being allowed to enter. The competition is a national one but is split into regions until the semi-finals with the final being held at Twickenham Stadium in London. As of 2018-19 it is the fourth most prestigious national club cup competition in England behind the Premiership Rugby Cup, RFU Championship Cup and RFU Intermediate Cup.

== History ==
The Senior Vase was introduced by the RFU during the 2006–07 season, and was competed for by English level 8 clubs. The original competition sponsors were EDF Energy, who had just taken over the sponsorship of national cup competitions from previous sponsors Powergen, although since the 2009–10 season there has been no sponsor. At the time of its inception it was the fourth most important competition in English rugby union behind the Anglo-Welsh Cup, National Trophy and Intermediate Cup but ahead of the Junior Vase. The finals for the Intermediate Cup, Senior Vase and Junior Vase are played at the end of each season at Twickenham Stadium, with games all taking place on the same specified date throughout the day.

== Current format ==
The rounds are contested on a regional basis between the four regional unions (North, Midlands, London & South East, South West) until the semi-finals, where the winner of each region enters the national competition, with the winner of each semi-final meeting at the final at Twickenham Stadium. Each region has a different qualification method (more detail on this below) and at the end of this qualification there are four regional champions who play in the national semi-finals the ground being one of the semi-finalist's home. The semi-finals pairings are London & South East against South West and Midlands against North.

=== North ===
The format for northern teams involved in the RFU Senior Vase is a league-cup hybrid with each county union in the region selecting one representative each. The first stage features a mini league with clubs from Cheshire, Cumbria and Lancashire meeting in one pool and clubs from Durham County, Northumberland and Yorkshire, meeting in the other, each side playing 2 games each. The winners of each group then meet in the north final to determine who goes forward to the national semi-finals. The competition involves representative teams from the following level 8 leagues:

- Cumbria 2
- Durham/Northumberland 2
- South Lancs/Cheshire 2
- Yorkshire 2

=== Midlands ===
The format for Midlands teams involved in the RFU Senior Vase is a direct knockout cup with a 1st round, 2nd round, 3rd round, semi-finals and final, with all sides from the eligible leagues taking part. The winner of the final goes forward to the Senior Vase national semi-finals. The competition involves all teams from the following level 8 leagues:

- Midlands 3 West (North)
- Midlands 3 West (South)
- Midlands 3 East (North)
- Midlands 3 East (South)

=== London and South East ===
As with the Midlands the format for London and South East teams involved in the RFU Senior Vase is a direct knockout cup with a 1st round, 2nd round, 3rd round, semi-finals and final, with all eligible teams taking part. The winner of the final goes forward to the Senior Vase national semi-finals. The competition involves all teams from the following level 8 leagues:

- London 3 Eastern Counties
- London 3 Essex
- London 3 North West
- London 3 South East
- London 3 South West

=== South West ===
The format for the south-west teams is more complex with different methods of qualification decided on by the county unions that they represent. Clubs that are affiliated with Dorset & Wilts and Gloucestershire play in county based knock-out competitions first. The winners of the Dorset & Wilts competition then plays in the Southern Counties semi-finals against representatives from Berkshire, Buckinghamshire and Oxfordshire, while the Gloucestershire winners play in the South West Counties semi-finals against representative from Cornwall, Devon and Somerset, with the winners then meeting in a regional final. Finally, the Southern Counties and South West Counties winners meet to determine qualification for the national semi-finals. Teams involved (1st XV only) are from the following level 8 leagues:

- Berks/Bucks & Oxon Premier
- Dorset & Wilts 1 North
- Dorset & Wilts 1 South
- Gloucester Premier
- Tribute Cornwall/Devon
- Tribute Somerset Premier

== Competition results ==
Season	Winner	Score	Runners–up	Name
2006–07	Northwich (N)	18–13	Bradford Salem (N)	EDF Energy Senior Vase
2007–08	Hartpury College (SW)	83–5	Wheatley Hills (N)	EDF Energy Senior Vase
2008–09	Cullompton (SW)	8–7	Tyldesley (N)	EDF Energy Senior Vase
2009–10	Brighton (SE)	32–3	Dunlop (M)	RFU Senior Vase
2010–11	Teddington (SE)	42–8	Littleborough (N)	RFU Senior Vase
2011–12	Wells (SW)	31–22	Wath-upon-Dearne (N)	RFU Senior Vase
2012–13	Selby (N)	29–25	Drybrook (SW)	RFU Senior Vase
2013–14	Newent (SW)	20–13	Yarnbury (N)	RFU Senior Vase
2014–15	Bromley (SE)	16–10	West Leeds (N)	RFU Senior Vase
2015–16	West Leeds (N)	42–22	Withycombe (SW)	RFU Senior Vase
2016–17	Farnham (SE)	37–15	Droitwich (M)	RFU Senior Vase
2017–18	Wath-upon-Dearne (N)	22–18	Saltash (SW)	RFU Senior Vase
2018–19	Honiton (SW)	29–27	Northallerton (N)	RFU Senior Vase
(N) stands for Northern region, (M) for Midlands, (SE) for London & South East, (SW) for South-west

== Number of wins ==
=== Club ===
- Bromley (1)
- Brighton (1)
- Cullompton (1)
- Farnham (1)
- Hartpury College (1)
- Honiton (1)
- Newent (1)
- Northwich (1)
- Selby (1)
- Teddington (1)
- Wath-upon-Dearne (1)
- Wells
- West Leeds (1)

=== Region ===
- South West (5)
- London & South East (4)
- North (4)
- Midlands (0)

== See also ==
- Anglo-Welsh Cup
- EDF Energy Trophy
- Premiership Rugby Cup
- RFU Championship Cup
- RFU Intermediate Cup
- RFU Junior Vase
- Rugby union in England
