= Cornwall/Devon League =

English level eight Rugby Union league

- Sport: Rugby union
- Instituted: 1987
- Ceased: 2022
- Number of teams: 14
- Country: England
- Holders: Pirates Amateurs (1st title) (2021–22) (promoted to Counties 1 Western West)
- Most titles: Paignton, Penryn (3 titles)
- Website: South West Division

Cornwall/Devon League (known as Tribute Cornwall/Devon League for sponsorship reasons) was an English level eight, rugby union league for clubs principally based in Cornwall and Devon. Following the reorganisation of the English rugby union leagues in 2022, the league was replaced by two level eight leagues based in Cornwall and Devon. The Pirates Amateurs won the last competition in season 2021–22 and were promoted to Counties 1 Western West

== Format ==
The champions and runner-up were promoted to Western Counties West. The number of teams relegated depends on feedback following promotion and relegation in the leagues above, but was usually two or three to Cornwall 1 and/or Devon 1. The season ran from September to April and comprised twenty-six rounds of matches, with each club playing each of its rivals, home and away. The results of the matches contributed points to the league as follows:

- 4 points are awarded for a win
- 2 points are awarded for a draw
- 0 points are awarded for a loss, however
- 1 losing (bonus) point is awarded to a team that loses a match by 7 points or fewer
- 1 additional (bonus) point is awarded to a team scoring 4 tries or more in a match.

The top two teams are promoted to Western Counties West and the bottom three teams are relegated to either Cornwall 1 or Devon 1 depending on their location.

== 2021–22 ==
The 2021–22 Cornwall/Devon League consisted of fourteen teams; eight from Devon and six from Cornwall. The season started on 4 September 2021 and the final matches were played on 23 April 2022. Nine of the fourteen teams participated in the previous, completed season (2019–20); which following the withdrawal of Lanner in February 2020 only had thirteen teams. Truro and Paignton were promoted to Western Counties West as champions and runner-up respectively while South Molton and Exeter Athletic were relegated to Devon 1.

Five of the fourteen teams from the 2021–22 competition were promoted to the level seven Counties 1 Western West for the 2022–23 season; Pirates Amateurs, Topsham, Cullompton, Bude and Plymstock Albion Oaks. Five teams were assigned to the level eight league Counties 2 Cornwall; Hayle, Liskead-Looe, Newquay Hornets, Saltash and Veor while four teams were assigned to the level eight league Counties 2 Devon; North Tawton, Tavistock, Torquay Athletic and Withycombe. No teams were relegated to level nine.

=== Participating teams and locations ===
Team	Ground	Capacity	Town/City	Previous season
Bude	Bencoolen Meadow	750	Bude, Cornwall	4th
Cullompton	Stafford Park		Cullompton, Devon	Relegated from Western Counties West (14th)
Hayle	Memorial Park		Hayle, Cornwall	Promoted from Cornwall 1 (champions)
Liskeard-Looe	Lux Park		Liskeard	9th
Newquay Hornets	Newquay Sports Ground		Newquay, Cornwall	Promoted from Cornwall 1 (runner-up)
North Tawton	Taw Meadow		North Tawton	7th
Pirates Amateurs	Mennaye Field	4,000 (2,200 seats)	Penzance, Cornwall	5th
Plymstock Albion Oaks	Horsham Playing Fields		Staddiscombe, Plymouth	3rd
Saltash	Moorlands Lane		Saltash, Cornwall	Relegated from Western Counties West (12th)
Tavistock	Sandy Park	500	Tavistock, Devon	11th
Topsham	Bonfire Field		Topsham, Exeter	6th
Torquay Athletic	Recreation Ground	3,000 (300 seats)	Torquay, Devon	8th
Veor	Memorial Ground	500	Camborne	10th
Withycombe	Raleigh Park		Exmouth, Devon	Promoted from Devon 1 (champions)

Locations of the 2021–22 Cornwall/Devon teams in Cornwall
Locations of the 2021–22 Cornwall/Devon teams in Devon

=== League table ===
2021–22 Cornwall/Devon League Table
		Played	Won	Drawn	Lost	Points for	Points against	Points diff	Try bonus	Loss bonus	Points	Points adj
1	Pirates Amateurs	26	24	0	2	897	347	550	17	1	116	
2	Topsham	26	23	0	3	1028	300	728	18	1	114	
3	Cullompton	26	19	2	5	1008	380	628	15	3	98	
4	Bude	26	18	0	8	678	488	190	12	2	87	
5	Plymstock Albion Oaks	26	16	1	9	738	557	181	17	2	85	
6	Tavistock	26	13	1	12	648	628	20	14	3	72	
7	Veor	26	11	1	14	560	735	−175	9	5	61	
8	Torquay Athletic	26	13	0	13	584	730	−146	9	1	58	−5
9	Saltash	26	10	1	15	728	743	−15	12	4	58	
10	North Tawton	26	8	1	16	492	609	−117	8	8	52	
11	Withycombe	26	9	3	14	358	575	−217	2	4	49	
12	Liskeard-Looe	26	2	1	23	212	695	−483	0	6	18	
13	Newquay Hornets	26	7	2	17	410	830	−420	2	3	7	−30
14	Hayle	26	2	0	24	166	890	−724	1	1	−15	−25
Points are awarded as follows: four points for a win; two points for a draw; no points for a loss; one bonus point for scoring four tries or more in a match; one bonus point for losing by seven points or less.; If teams are level at any stage, tiebreakers are applied in the following order: 1. Number of matches won 2. Difference between points for and against 3. Total number of points for 4. Aggregate number of points scored in matches between tied teams
Green background are the promotion places. Updated: 7 August 2022

== 2020–21 ==
Due to the COVID-19 pandemic, the 2020–21 season was cancelled.

== 2019–20 ==
=== Participating teams and locations ===
Team	Ground	Capacity	Town/City	Previous season
Bude	Bencoolen Meadow	750	Bude, Cornwall	3rd
Exeter Athletic	Bravelands		Clyst St Mary, Devon	Promoted from Devon 1 (playoff)
Lanner	St. Day Rugby Field		Lanner, Cornwall	9th
Liskeard-Looe	Lux Park		Liskeard	6th
North Tawton	Taw Meadow		North Tawton	Promoted from Devon 1 (champions)
Paignton	Queen's Park	1,650 (150 seats)	Paignton, Devon	Relegated from Western Counties West (14th)
Pirates Amateurs	Mennaye Field	4,000 (2,200 seats)	Penzance, Cornwall	11th
Plymstock Albion Oaks	Horsham Playing Fields		Staddiscombe, Plymouth	4th
South Molton	Station Road		South Molton	7th
Tavistock	Sandy Park	500	Tavistock, Devon	10th
Topsham	Bonfire Field		Topsham, Exeter	8th
Torquay Athletic	Recreation Ground	3,000 (300 seats)	Torquay, Devon	5th
Truro	St Clement's Hill	2,000	Truro, Cornwall	Relegated from Western Counties West (13th)
Veor	Memorial Ground	500	Camborne	Promoted from Cornwall 1 (champions)

Locations of the 2019–20 Cornwall/Devon teams

=== League table ===
2019–20 Cornwall/Devon League Table (to 16 March 2020, when play stopped due to COVID-19)
		Played	Won	Drawn	Lost	Points for	Points against	Points diff	Try bonus	Loss bonus	Points
1	Truro RFC	22	19	0	3	782	281	501			78
2	Paignton (P)	21	17	0	4	452	239	213			70
3	Plymstock Albion Oaks	20	15	0	5	488	331	157			61
4	Bude	21	14	0	7	507	292	215			57
5	Pirates Amateurs	20	13	0	7	506	354	152			54
6	Topsham	22	12	0	9	588	386	202			48
7	North Tawton	22	11	1	10	355	439	−84			47
8	Torquay Athletic	21	11	0	10	493	473	20			45
9	Liskeard-Looe	21	7	2	12	348	540	−102			34
10	Veor	23	8	1	14	414	580	−166			34
11	Lanner	19	7	0	12	317	426	−109			28
12	Tavistock	22	5	0	17	356	545	−189			20
13	Exeter Athletic	19	4	0	15	247	645	−398			16
14	South Molton	22	2	0	20	248	660	−412			8
Points are awarded as follows: four points for a win; two points for a draw; no points for a loss; one bonus point for scoring four tries or more in a match; one bonus point for losing by seven points or less.; If teams are level at any stage, tiebreakers are applied in the following order: 1. Number of matches won 2. Difference between points for and against 3. Total number of points for 4. Aggregate number of points scored in matches between tied teams
Green background is the promotion place. Blue background is the play-off place. Pink background are relegation places. Updated: 2 April 2021

== 2018–19 ==
=== Participating teams and locations ===
Team	Ground	Capacity	Town/City	Previous season
Bude	Bencoolen Meadow	750	Bude, Cornwall	5th
Hayle	Memorial Park		Hayle, Cornwall	11th
Honiton	Allhallows Playing Field		Honiton, Devon	4th
Lanner	St. Day Rugby Field		Lanner, Cornwall	6th
Liskeard-Looe	Lux Park		Liskeard	Promoted from Cornwall 1 (champions)
Penryn	Memorial Ground	4,000 (200 seats)	Penryn, Cornwall	3rd
Pirates Amateurs	Mennaye Field	4,000 (2,200 seats)	Penzance, Cornwall	12th
Plymouth Argaum	Bickleigh Down		Plymouth, Devon	9th
Plymstock Albion Oaks	Horsham Playing Fields		Staddiscombe, Plymouth	8th
South Molton	Station Road		South Molton	Promoted from Devon 1 (champions)
Tavistock	Sandy Park	500	Tavistock, Devon	10th
Topsham	Bonfire Field		Topsham, Exeter	Promoted from Devon 1 (play-off)
Torquay Athletic	Recreation Ground	3,000 (300 seats)	Torquay, Devon	Relegated from Western Counties West (13th)
Withycombe	Raleigh Park		Exmouth, Devon	7th

Locations of the 2018–19 Cornwall/Devon teams

=== Final league table ===
2018–19 Cornwall/Devon League Table
	Team	Played	Won	Drawn	Lost	Points for	Points against	Points diff	Try bonus	Loss bonus	Points	Points deducted
1	Penryn	26	22	2	2	964	241	723	18	1	113	
2	Honiton	26	22	0	4	1122	307	815	19	2	110	
3	Bude	26	21	1	4	769	336	433	16	0	104	
4	Plymouth Albion Oaks	26	19	0	7	662	519	143	13	1	90	
5	Torquay Athletic	26	17	0	9	790	495	295	13	3	84	
6	Liskeard-Looe	26	13	1	12	566	519	47	9	3	66	
7	South Molton	26	12	2	12	579	597	−18	11	2	66	
8	Topsham	26	10	0	16	611	634	−23	11	6	57	
9	Lanner	26	11	0	15	516	593	−77	7	5	52	−5
10	Tavistock	26	10	0	16	361	613	−252	5	6	51	
11	Pirates Amateurs	26	8	0	18	458	750	−292	6	5	43	
12	Hayle	26	7	0	19	502	973	−471	8	4	40	
13	Plymouth Argaum	26	5	0	21	287	941	−654	2	2	24	
14	Withycombe	26	2	0	24	264	933	−669	3	5	6	−10
If teams are level at any stage, tiebreakers are applied in the following order: 1. Number of matches won 2. Difference between points for and against 3. Total number of points for 4. Aggregate number of points scored in matches between tied teams 5. Number of matches won excluding the first match, then the second and so on until the tie is settled
Green background are promotion places. Pink background are relegation places. Updated: 12 April 2021

== 2017–18 ==
The season started on 2 September 2017 and finished on 21 April 2018. Fourteen teams contested the Cornwall/Devon league, seven from Devon, six from Cornwall and one from Somerset (Wellington). Nine of the sides played in the league last season and are joined by Bude (13th) and Wellington (14th), both relegated from Western Counties West, and three sides promoted from Devon 1 and Cornwall 1. Wessex (from Devon 1) and Hayle (Cornwall 1) are champions of their respective leagues and Torrington were also promoted after Newquay Hornets declined to contest a play-off for the third promotion match.

=== Participating teams and locations ===
Team	Ground	Capacity	Town/City	Previous season
Bude	Bencoolen Meadow	750	Bude, Cornwall	Relegated from Western Counties West (13th)
Hayle	Memorial Park		Hayle, Cornwall	Promoted from Cornwall 1 (champions)
Honiton	Allhallows Playing Field		Honiton, Devon	11th
Lanner	St. Day Rugby Field		Lanner, Cornwall	7th
Penryn	Memorial Ground	4,000 (200 seats)	Penryn, Cornwall	5th
Pirates Amateurs	Mennaye Field	4,000 (2,200 seats)	Penzance, Cornwall	8th
Plymouth Argaum	Bickleigh Down		Plymouth, Devon	10th
Plymstock Albion Oaks	Horsham Playing Fields		Staddiscombe, Plymouth	6th
Saltash	Moorlands Lane		Saltash, Cornwall	3rd
Tavistock	Sandy Park	500	Tavistock, Devon	9th
Torrington	Donnacroft		Great Torrington, Devon	Promoted from Devon 1 (play-off)
Wellington	Athletic Ground		Wellington, Somerset	Relegated from Western Counties West (14th)
Wessex	Flowerpot Playing Fields		Exeter	Promoted from Devon 1 (champions)
Withycombe	Raleigh Park		Exmouth, Devon	4th

Locations of the 2017–18 Cornwall/Devon teams in Cornwall
Locations of the 2017–18 Cornwall/Devon teams in Devon and Somerset

=== Final league table ===
2017–18 Cornwall/Devon League Table
	Team	Played	Won	Drawn	Lost	Points for	Points against	Points diff	Try bonus	Loss bonus	Points	Points deducted
1	Wellington	26	24	0	2	997	262	735	18	2	118	
2	Saltash	26	21	0	5	936	356	580	19	3	109	
3	Penryn	26	22	1	3	973	228	745	17	1	108	
4	Honiton	25	19	0	6	778	333	445	14	4	94	
5	Bude	25	17	0	8	646	399	247	13	3	84	
6	Lanner	25	13	1	11	670	518	152	11	2	67	
7	Withycombe	26	11	2	13	630	545	85	10	5	63	
8	Plymstock Albion Oaks	26	11	2	13	506	598	−92	9	2	54	−5
9	Plymouth Argaum	26	9	0	17	358	881	−523	6	2	44	
10	Tavistock	26	7	0	19	393	664	−271	8	5	42	
11	Hayle	26	8	1	17	361	645	−284	3	3	35	−5
12	Pirates Amateurs	25	6	0	19	387	888	−501	7	4	35	
13	Exeter Athletic	26	3	1	22	381	1065	−684	7	4	25	
14	Torrington	26	5	0	21	283	917	−634	3	3	21	−5
If teams are level at any stage, tiebreakers are applied in the following order: 1. Number of matches won 2. Difference between points for and against 3. Total number of points for 4. Aggregate number of points scored in matches between tied teams 5. Number of matches won excluding the first match, then the second and so on until the tie is settled
Green background are promotion places. Pink background are relegation places. Updated: 12 April 2021

== 2016–17 ==
A total of fourteen teams contested the Cornwall/Devon league, eight from Devon and six from Cornwall. Nine of the sides played in the league last season and were joined by two relegated from Western Counties West, two promoted from Devon 1 and one promoted from Cornwall 1. The relegated teams were Penryn (13th place) and Saltash (14th) and the incoming teams are Tamar Saracens and Topsham (both from Devon 1) and Lanner (Cornwall 1). The season started on 3 September 2016 and ended on 22 April 2017.

Falmouth won the league for the first time and along with the runner-up, Paignton are promoted to Western Counties West. The bottom three teams are relegated; Bodmin to Cornwall 1 and Topsham and Tamar Saracens to Devon 1.

=== Participating teams and locations ===
Locations of the 2016–17 Cornwall/Devon teams in Cornwall
Locations of the 2016–17 Cornwall/Devon teams in Devon

Team	Ground	Capacity	Town/Village	Previous season
Bodmin	Clifden Park		Bodmin, Cornwall	9th
Falmouth	Recreation Ground	3,000	Falmouth, Cornwall	6th
Honiton	Allhallows Playing Field		Honiton, Devon	10th
Lanner	St. Day Rugby Field		Lanner, Cornwall	Promoted from Cornwall 1 (champions)
Paignton	Queen's Park	1,650 (150 seats)	Paignton, Devon	8th
Penryn	Memorial Ground	4,000 (200 seats)	Penryn, Cornwall	Relegated from Western Counties West (14th)
Pirates Amateurs	Mennaye Field	4,000 (2,200 seats)	Penzance, Cornwall	5th
Plymouth Argaum	Bickleigh Down		Plymouth, Devon	7th
Plymstock Albion Oaks	Horsham Playing Fields		Staddiscombe, Plymouth	4th
Saltash	Moorlands Lane		Saltash, Cornwall	relegated from Western Counties West (13th)
Tamar Saracens	The Parkway		Ernesettle, Plymouth	Promoted from Devon 1 (champions)
Tavistock	Sandy Park	500	Tavistock, Devon	11th
Topsham	Bonfire Field		Topsham, Exeter	Promoted from Devon 1 (runner-up)
Withycombe	Raleigh Park		Withycombe, Exmouth, Devon	3rd

=== Final league table ===
2016–17 Cornwall/Devon League Table
	Team	Played	Won	Drawn	Lost	Points for	Points against	Points diff	Try bonus	Loss bonus	Points	Points deducted
1	Falmouth	26	24	0	2	1004	269	735	18	2	112	−5
2	Paignton	26	24	0	2	788	216	572	15	1	104	−10
3	Saltash	26	19	0	7	778	458	320	17	3	92	−5
4	Withycombe	26	13	0	13	578	468	110	11	8	72	
5	Penryn	26	15	0	11	679	377	302	13	3	71	−5
6	Plymstock Albion Oaks	26	14	1	11	449	572	−123	4	2	64	
7	Lanner	26	12	1	13	583	551	32	9	4	63	
8	Pirates Amateurs	26	13	0	13	554	602	−48	7	3	62	
9	Tavistock	26	11	0	15	431	649	−218	8	2	54	
10	Plymouth Argaum	26	10	0	16	370	632	−262	6	4	50	
11	Honiton	26	8	1	17	526	607	−81	4	5	44	
12	Bodmin	26	7	0	19	433	810	−377	7	6	41	
13	Topsham	26	8	1	17	445	786	−341	7	2	33	−10
14	Tamar Saracens	26	2	0	24	164	785	−621	0	3	6	−5
If teams are level at any stage, tiebreakers are applied in the following order: 1. Number of matches won 2. Difference between points for and against 3. Total number of points for 4. Aggregate number of points scored in matches between tied teams 5. Number of matches won excluding the first match, then the second and so on until the tie is settled
Green background are promotion places. Pink background are relegation places. Updated: 16 May 2017

== 2015–16 ==
=== Participating teams and locations ===
A total of fourteen teams contested the Cornwall/Devon league, seven each from Cornwall and Devon. Nine of the sides played in the league last season and were joined by two relegated from Western Counties West, two promoted from Devon 1 and one promoted from Cornwall 1. The relegated teams are Tavistock (13th place) and St Ives (14th), and the incoming teams are Plymouth Argaum and Plymstock Albion Oaks (both from Devon 1) and Newquay Hornets (Cornwall 1). The season started on 5 September 2015 and ended on 30 April 2016 with three matches still to play; the RFU deciding that the matches need not be played.

Bude, won the league for the first time and along with the runner-up, St Ives are promoted to Western Counties West. The bottom three teams are relegated; Newquay Hornets and Hayle to Cornwall 1 and Exeter Saracens to Devon 1.

Locations of the 2015–16 Cornwall/Devon teams in Cornwall
Locations of the 2015–16 Cornwall/Devon teams in Devon

Team	Ground	Capacity	Town/Village	Previous season
Bodmin	Clifden Park		Bodmin, Cornwall	8th
Bude	Bencoolen Meadow	750	Bude, Cornwall	7th
Exeter Saracens	Exhibition Fields, Summer Lane		Whipton, Exeter, Devon	11th
Falmouth	Recreation Ground	3,000	Falmouth, Cornwall	6th
Hayle	Memorial Park		Hayle, Cornwall	9th
Honiton	Allhallows Playing Field		Honiton, Devon	10th
Newquay Hornets	Newquay Sports Ground		Newquay, Cornwall	Promoted from Cornwall 1
Paignton	Queen's Park	1,650 (150 seats)	Paignton, Devon	5th
Pirates Amateurs	Mennaye Field	4,000 (2,200 seats)	Penzance, Cornwall	4th
Plymouth Argaum	Bickleigh Down		Plymouth, Devon	Promoted from Devon 1
Plymstock Albion Oaks	Horsham Playing Fields		Staddiscombe, Plymouth	Promoted from Devon 1 (via play-off)
St Ives	Recreation Ground	3,000 (275 seats)	St Ives, Cornwall	Relegated from Western Counties West (14th)
Tavistock	Sandy Park	500	Tavistock, Devon	Relegated from Western Counties West (13th)
Withycombe	Raleigh Park		Withycombe, Exmouth, Devon	3rd

=== Final league table ===
2015–16 Cornwall/Devon League Table
	Team	Played	Won	Drawn	Lost	Points for	Points against	Points diff	Try bonus	Loss bonus	Points	Points deducted
1	Bude	26	23	1	2	928	282	646	20	2	117	
2	St Ives	26	23	0	3	896	263	633	18	2	108	5
3	Withycombe	25	19	0	6	866	341	525	16	3	95	
4	Plymstock Albion Oaks	26	17	2	7	641	366	275	11	2	86	
5	Pirates Amateurs	24	15	0	9	578	409	169	11	3	76	
6	Falmouth	26	15	2	9	610	498	112	8	3	75	
7	Plymouth Argaum	25	13	1	11	531	362	169	8	5	67	
8	Paignton	25	12	1	12	430	471	−41	4	3	58	
9	Bodmin	26	10	0	16	336	700	−364	4	3	47	
10	Honiton	26	8	0	18	399	604	−205	3	5	41	
11	Tavistock	26	6	2	18	338	743	−405	4	4	36	
12	Hayle	26	6	2	18	317	661	−344	2	4	34	
13	Newquay Hornets	26	3	1	22	213	805	−592	1	4	14	5
14	Exeter Saracens	25	3	0	22	354	932	−578	5	2	9	10
If teams are level at any stage, tiebreakers are applied in the following order: 1. Number of matches won 2. Difference between points for and against 3. Total number of points for 4. Aggregate number of points scored in matches between tied teams 5. Number of matches won excluding the first match, then the second and so on until the tie is settled
Green background are promotion places. Pink background are relegation places. Updated: 8 May 2016

== 2014–15 ==
=== Participating teams and locations ===
The 2014–15 Cornwall/Devon League consisted of fourteen teams; seven from Cornwall and seven from Devon. The season started on 6 September 2014 and the final matches were played on 18 April 2015. Crediton beat the runner-up Saltash on the final day of the season to claim first place and both teams were promoted to Western Counties West. The bottom three teams were relegated; Old Plymothian & Mannamedian and South Molton to Devon 1, and Liskeard-Looe to Cornwall 1.

Team	Ground	Capacity	Town/Village	Previous season
Bodmin	Clifden Park		Bodmin, Cornwall	Promoted from Cornwall 1 (playoffs)
Bude	Bencoolen Meadow	750	Bude, Cornwall	Relegated from Western Counties West (13th)
Crediton	Blagdon		Crediton, Devon	4th
Exeter Saracens	Exhibition Fields, Summer Lane		Whipton, Exeter, Devon	11th
Falmouth	Recreation Ground	3,000	Falmouth, Cornwall	6th
Hayle	Memorial Park		Hayle, Cornwall	8th
Honiton	Allhallows Playing Field		Honiton, Devon	5th
Liskeard-Looe	Lux Park		Liskeard, Cornwall	Promoted from Cornwall 1 (champions)
Old Plymothian & Mannamedian	King George V Playing Field		Elburton, Plymouth, Devon	9th
Paignton	Queen's Park	1,650 (150 seats)	Paignton, Devon	Relegated from Western Counties West (14th)
Pirates Amateurs	Mennaye Field	4,000 (2,200 seats)	Penzance, Cornwall	10th
Saltash	Moorlands Lane		Saltash, Cornwall	7th
South Molton	Station Road		South Molton, Devon	Promoted from Devon 1 (champions)
Withycombe	Raleigh Park		Withycombe, Exmouth, Devon	3rd

=== Final league table ===
2014–15 Cornwall/Devon League Table
	Team	Played	Won	Drawn	Lost	Points for	Points against	Points diff	Try bonus	Loss bonus	Points	Points deducted
1	Crediton	26	25	0	1	875	302	573	19	1	121	
2	Saltash	26	24	0	2	1158	327	831	21	1	118	
3	Withycombe	26	19	1	6	823	366	457	15	4	97	
4	Pirates Amateurs	26	17	0	9	836	418	418	13	4	85	
5	Paignton	26	15	0	11	590	501	89	10	3	74	
6	Falmouth	26	15	0	11	508	439	69	8	2	71	
7	Bude	26	13	0	13	529	588	−59	9	2	64	
8	Bodmin	26	12	0	14	508	556	−48	8	4	61	
9	Hayle	26	12	0	14	510	585	−75	6	3	58	
10	Honiton	26	11	1	14	423	544	−121	4	3	54	
11	Exeter Saracens	26	8	0	18	613	847	−234	10	4	46	
12	Old Plymothian & Mannamedian	26	7	0	19	322	896	−574	2	1	31	
13	South Molton	26	2	0	24	328	864	−536	4	3	15	
14	Liskeard-Looe	26	1	0	25	134	924	−790	0	1	–15	20
If teams are level at any stage, tiebreakers are applied in the following order: 1. Number of matches won 2. Difference between points for and against 3. Total number of points for 4. Aggregate number of points scored in matches between tied teams 5. Number of matches won excluding the first match, then the second and so on until the tie is settled
Green background are promotion places. Pink background are relegation places. Updated: 14 July 2015

== 2013–14 ==
Exeter University, the champions, lost only one match and finished in their highest ever league placing. Tiverton came second and both teams were promoted to Western Counties West for 2014–15 season. Newquay Hornets, and Veor who won only two matches and promoted the previous season, are both relegated to Cornwall 1.

== 2012–13 ==
In 2012–13 the Cornwall/Devon League consisted of thirteen teams; seven from Cornwall and six from Devon. The season started on 8 September 2012 and ended on 20 April 2013. Plymouth Barbarians were originally included in the fixtures but dropped out of the league during the season.

2012–13 Cornwall/Devon League Table
	Team	Played	Won	Drawn	Lost	Points for	Points against	Points diff	Bonus points	Points	Points deducted
1	Teignmouth	24	22	0	2	911	270	641	22	110	
2	St Ives	24	23	0	1	750	266	484	15	104	5
3	Tiverton	24	16	2	6	571	389	182	11	79	
4	Saltash	24	16	0	8	642	448	194	11	70	5
5	Hayle	24	12	2	10	441	460	−19	7	59	
6	Old Plymothian & Mannamedian	24	12	0	12	537	580	−43	10	58	
7	Withycombe	24	11	1	12	546	533	13	9	55	
8	Falmouth	24	10	0	14	436	599	−163	11	51	
9	Pirates Amateurs	24	9	2	13	406	477	−71	8	48	
10	Crediton	24	7	3	14	431	467	−36	8	42	
11	Newquay Hornets	24	7	0	17	501	579	−78	15	38	5
12	Liskeard-Looe	24	4	2	18	293	642	−349	7	22	5
13	Wessex	24	1	0	23	200	955	−755	3	2	5
If teams are level at any stage, tiebreakers are applied in the following order: 1. Number of matches won 2. Difference between points for and against 3. Total number of points for 4. Aggregate number of points scored in matches between tied teams 5. Number of matches won excluding the first match, then the second and so on until the tie is settled
Green background are promotion places. Pink background are relegation places. Updated: 14 July 2015

== 2009–10 ==
=== Table ===
2009–10 Cornwall/Devon League Table
	Team	Played	Won	Drawn	Lost	Points for	Points against	Points diff	Points	Points deducted
1	Wellington	26	26	0	0	1086	170	916	52	
2	Exeter Saracens	26	19	1	6	702	271	431	39	
3	St Austell	26	16	1	9	518	350	168	33	
4	Crediton	26	16	0	10	596	303	293	32	
5	Teignmouth	26	16	1	9	678	349	329	31	−2
6	Bideford	26	14	2	10	572	321	251	30	
6	Liskeard-Looe	26	15	0	11	504	424	80	30	
8	Falmouth	26	14	2	10	367	327	40	30	
9	Stithians	26	12	1	13	454	571	−117	23	−2
10	Hayle	25	11	1	13	329	361	−32	19	−4
11	Torrington	26	9	1	15	325	544	−219	19	
12	Saltash	26	4	0	22	349	901	−552	8	
13	Old Plymothian & Mannamedian	26	4	0	22	229	767	−538	4	−4
14	Plymouth Albion Oaks	26	0	0	26	179	1229	−1050	0	−2
Points are awarded as follows: two points for a win; one point for a draw; no points for a loss.; If teams are level at any stage, tiebreakers are applied in the following order: (1) difference between points for and against, (2) total number of points for.
Green background are promotion places. Pink background are relegation places

== 1989–90 ==
=== Table ===
1989–90 Courage Cornwall/Devon League Table
	Club	Played	Won	Drawn	Lost	Points for	Points against	Points difference	Points
1	Penzance–Newlyn	10	9	0	1	256	96	160	18
2	Sidmouth	10	9	0	1	165	73	92	18
3	Devonport Services	10	7	0	3	223	117	106	14
4	Plymouth Civil Service	10	7	0	3	181	125	56	14
5	Crediton	10	5	1	4	184	139	45	11
6	Teignmouth	10	4	2	4	128	138	−10	10
7	Bideford	10	4	0	6	163	123	40	8
8	Exeter Saracens	10	3	0	7	61	110	−49	6
9	Illogan Park	10	3	0	7	91	193	−102	6
10	Falmouth	10	2	1	7	109	176	−67	5
11	Wadebridge Camels	10	0	0	10	29	300	−271	0
Points are awarded as follows: 2 pts for a win; 1 pt for a draw; 0 pts for a loss
Green background are teams promoted. Pink background are teams relegated.

== Original teams ==
When league rugby began in 1987 this division contained the following teams:

- Bideford
- Crediton
- Exmouth
- Falmouth
- Hayle
- Newton Abbot
- Paignton
- Penryn
- Penzance & Newlyn
- St Austell
- Teignmouth

== Cornwall/Devon honours ==
=== Cornwall/Devon League (1987–1993) ===
The original Cornwall/Devon League (sponsored by Courage) was a tier 8 league with promotion up to Western Counties and relegation down to either Cornwall 1 or Devon 1.

Cornwall/Devon League
Season	No of teams	Champions	Runners-up	Relegated team(s)	Ref
1987–88	11	Crediton	Exmouth	St Austell, Newton Abbot	
1988–89	11	Penryn	Teignmouth	Paignton, Exmouth, Hayle	
1989–90	11	Penzance-Newlyn	Sidmouth	Falmouth, Wadebridge Camels	
1990–91	11	Devon & Cornwall Police	Crediton	Devonport Services, Illogan Park	
1991–92	13	Bideford	Plymouth Civil Service (Note: Crediton also promoted.)	No relegation	
1992–93	13	Devonport Services	Exmouth	Bude, Saltash	
Green backgrounds are promotion places.

=== Cornwall/Devon League (1993–96) ===
The creation of National 5 South for the 1993–94 season meant that the Cornwall/Devon League dropped to a tier 9 league. Promotion continued to Western Counties and relegation to either Cornwall 1 or Devon 1. The league continued to be sponsored by Courage.

Cornwall/Devon League
Season	No of teams	Champions	Runners-up	Relegated team(s)	Ref
1993–94	13	Devon & Cornwall Police	Exmouth	Liskeard-Looe	
1994–95	13	Paignton	Sidmouth	Newquay Hornets	
1995–96	8	Sidmouth	St Austell (Note: Hayle also promoted.)	No relegation	
Green backgrounds are promotion places.

=== Cornwall/Devon League (1996–2009) ===
The cancellation of National 5 South at the end of the 1995–96 season saw the Cornwall/Devon League return to being a tier 8 division. Further restructuring meant that promotion was now to Western Counties West (formerly Western Counties) (Note: At the end of the 1995–96 season, Western Counties would split into two regional divisions; Western Counties North and Western Counties West.) while relegation continued to either Cornwall 1 or Devon 1. From the 2008–09 season onward the league sponsor would be Tribute.

Cornwall/Devon League
Season	No of teams	Champions	Runners-up	Relegated team(s)	Ref
1996–97	8	Kingsbridge	South Molton	Plymouth Civil Service, Veor (Note: Veor withdrew from the league this year and would be demoted two levels down to Cornwall 2 for the following season.)	
1997–98	10	Truro	Crediton	Saltash, Honiton	
1998–99	10	Newton Abbot	Withycombe	Old Plymouthians, Falmouth	
1999–00	10	Exmouth	Devonport Services	No relegation (Bideford 10th)	
2000–01	10	St Just	Bideford	Kingsbridge, Teignmouth, Bude, Sidmouth, Perranporth	
2001–02	10	Paignton	St Ives	Old Plymouthians, Torrington, Saltash	
2002–03	10	Devonport Services	Wessex	St Austell	
2003–04	12	Mounts Bay	Bude	Newquay Hornets, South Molton, Teignmouth	
2004–05	12	Sidmouth	Kingsbridge	Okehampton, Bideford, St Just	
2005–06	12	Tiverton	Devonport Services	Old Plymouthians, Liskeard-Looe	
2006–07	12	Paignton	Wadebridge Camels	St Austell, South Molton, Perranporth	
2007–08	12	Cullompton	Newquay Hornets	Honiton, Wessex, Teignmouth	
2008–09	14	Penryn	Okehampton (Note: 3rd placed Truro also promoted.)	No relegation (14th Falmouth)	
Green backgrounds are promotion places.

=== Cornwall/Devon League (2009–2022) ===
Despite widespread league restructuring by the RFU, the Cornwall/Devon League continued as a tier 8 division, with promotion to Western Counties West and relegation to either Cornwall 1 or Devon 1. Tribute continued to sponsor the league.

Cornwall/Devon League
Season	No of teams	Champions	Runners-up	Relegated team(s)	Ref
2009–10	14	Wellington	Exeter Saracens	Old Plymouthians, Plymstock Albion Oaks	
2010–11	14	Bideford	St Austell	Saltash, Stithians, Roseland	
2011–12	14	Tavistock	Honiton	Veor, Totnes, Torrington	
2012–13	13	Teignmouth	St Ives	Liskeard-Looe, Wessex	
2013–14	13	Exeter University	Tiverton	Newquay Hornets, Veor	(Note: Plymouth Barbarians withdrew from the league this year.)
2014–15	14	Crediton	Saltash	Old Plymothian & Mannamedian, South Molton, Liskeard-Looe	
2015–16	14	Bude	St Ives	Newquay Hornets, Exeter Saracens	
2016–17	14	Falmouth	Paignton	Tamar Saracens, Topsham, Bodmin	
2017–18	14	Wellington	Saltash	Torrington, Wessex	
2018–19	14	Penryn	Honiton	Withycombe, Plymouth Argaum, Hayle	
2019–20	13 (Note: League was reduced to 13 teams after Lanner withdrew from the competition in February.)	Truro	Paignton	South Molton, Exeter Athletic	
2020–21	Cancelled due to COVID-19 pandemic in the United Kingdom.				
2021–22	14	Pirates Amateurs	Topsham	Awaiting decision from RFU	
Green backgrounds are promotion places.

== Summary of champions and runners-up ==
Team	Champions	Year(s)	Runners-up	Year(s)
Paignton	3	1995, 2002, 2007	2	2017, 2020
Penryn	3	1989, 2009, 2019		
Devonport Services	2	1993, 2003	2	2000, 2006
Sidmouth	2	1996, 2005	2	1990, 1995
Crediton	2	1988, 2015	2	1991, 1998
Bideford	2	1992, 2011	1	2001
Devon & Cornwall Police	2	1991, 1994		
Truro	2	1998, 2020		
Wellington	2	2010, 2018		
Exmouth	1	2000	3	1988, 1993, 1994
Kingsbridge	1	1997	1	2005
Tiverton	1	2006	1	2014
Teignmouth	1	2013	1	1989
Bude	1	2016	1	2004
Penzance–Newlyn	1	1990		
Newton Abbot	1	1999		
St Just	1	2001		
Mounts Bay	1	2004		
Cullompton	1	2008		
Tavistock	1	2012		
Exeter University	1	2014		
Falmouth	1	2017		
Pirates Amateurs	1	2022		
St Ives			3	2002, 2013, 2016
St Austell			2	1996, 2011
Saltash			2	2015, 2018
Honiton			2	2012, 2019
Plymouth Civil Service			1	1992
South Molton			1	1997
Withycombe			1	1999
Wessex			1	2003
Wadebridge Camels			1	2007
Newquay Hornets			1	2008
Okehampton			1	2009
Exeter Saracens			1	2010
Topsham			1	2010

Place	Champions	Year(s)	Runners-up	Year(s)
Devon	21	1988, 1991, 1992, 1993, 1994, 1995, 1996, 1997, 1999, 2000, 2002, 2003, 2005, 2006, 2007, 2008, 2011, 2012, 2013, 2014, 2015	24	1988, 1989, 1990, 1991, 1992, 1993, 1994, 1995, 1997, 1998, 1999, 2000, 2001, 2003, 2005, 2006, 2009, 2010, 2012, 2014, 2017, 2019, 2020, 2022
Cornwall	11	1989, 1990, 1998, 2001, 2004, 2009, 2016, 2017, 2019, 2020, 2022	10	1996, 2002, 2004, 2007, 2008, 2011, 2013, 2015, 2016, 2018
Somerset	2	2010, 2018		

== Sponsorship ==
The Cornwall/Devon League was part of the Courage Clubs Championship and sponsored by Courage Brewery from the first season, 1987–88 to season 1996–97. The league was unsponsored until season 2007–08 when St Austell Brewery sponsored South-west based leagues under the Tribute Ale label.

== See also ==
- South West Division RFU
- Cornwall RFU
- Devon RFU
- English rugby union system
- Rugby union in Cornwall
- Rugby union in England
