= Torquay Athletic RFC =

English rugby union club, based in Torquay, Devon

(England) Torquay Athletic
- Full name: Torquay Athletic Rugby Football Club
- Union: Devon RFU
- Nickname: Tics
- Founded: 1876; 150 years ago
- Location: Torquay, Devon, England
- Ground: Recreation Ground (Capacity: 3,000 (300 seats))
- Chairman: Lee Mason
- President: Colin Rylance
- League: Tribute Western Counties West
- 2024-2025: 1st
Team kit

Official website
- www.torquayrfc.co.uk

Torquay Athletic RFC is an English rugby union team formed in 1876 (see detail below) based in Torquay, Devon. The club operates 3 senior men's teams as well as youth and mini teams, with the men's first team currently playing in Tribute Western Counties West. Nicknamed the "Tics", the first team's kit is black and white hoops and they play home games at the Recreation Ground. They have a local rivalry with Paignton RFC.

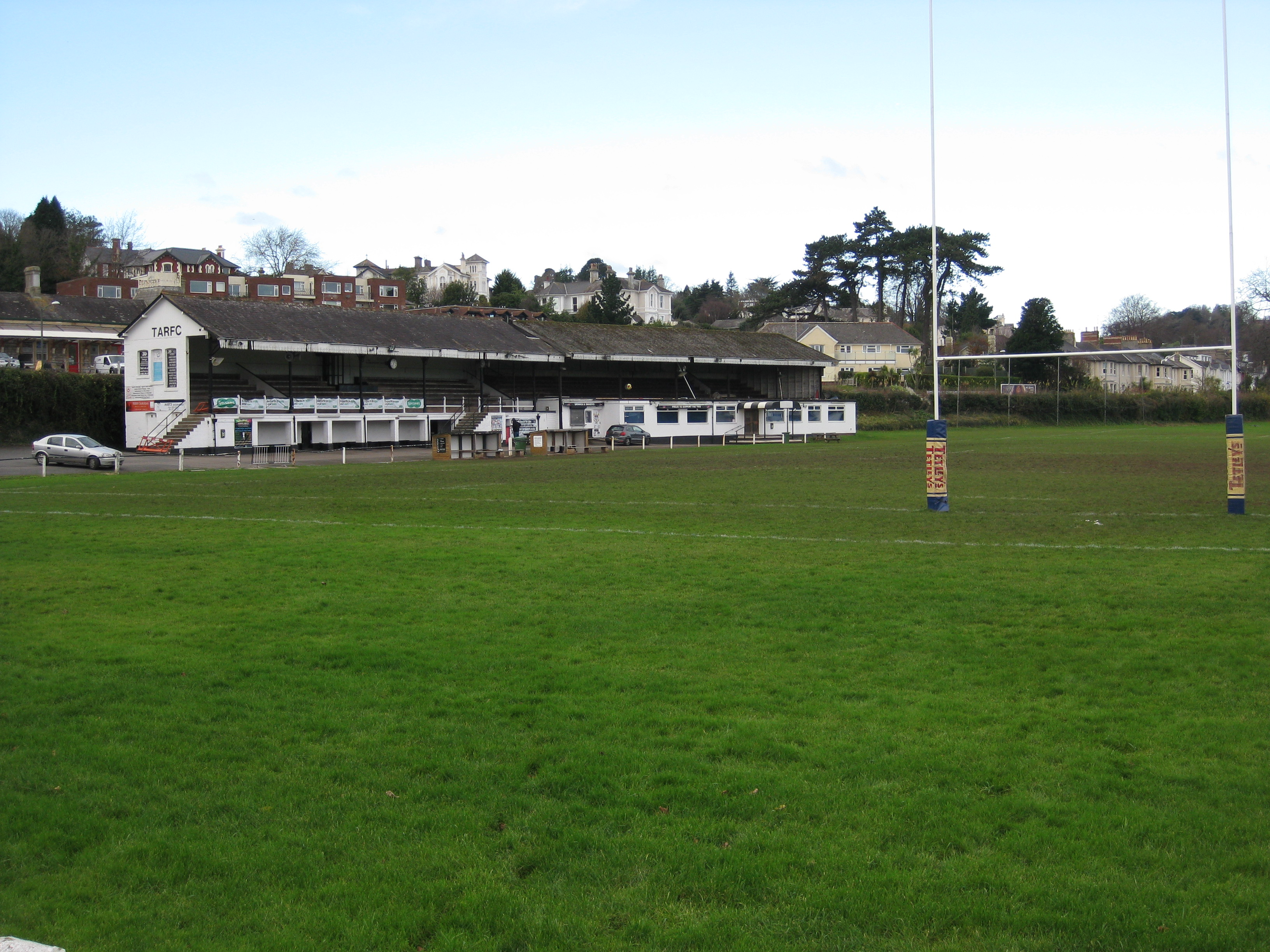
View of the grandstand at the Recreation Ground, home of Torquay Athletic RFC

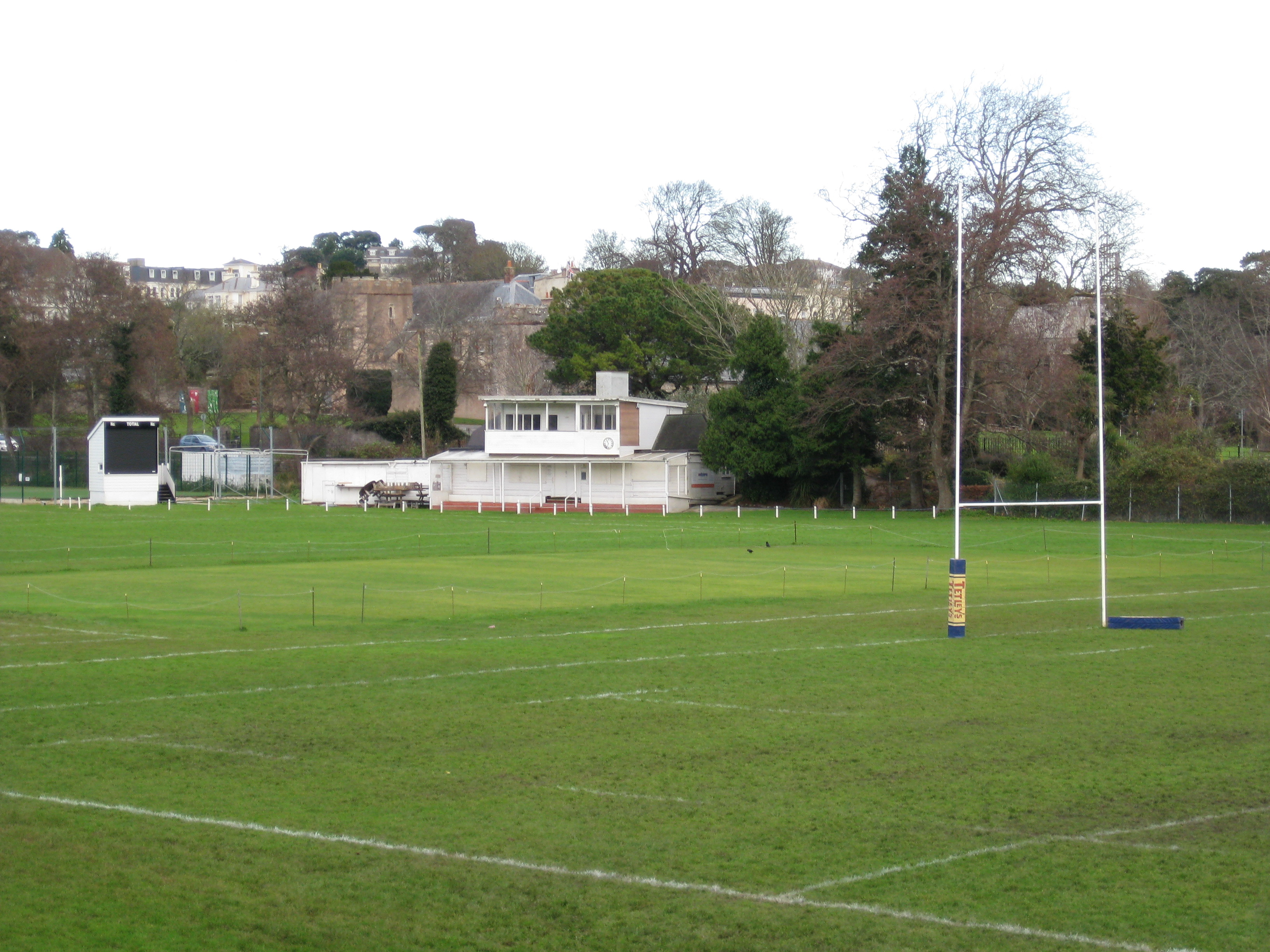
View from grandstand showing cricket pavilion

== History ==
=== Early days ===
There is some debate over when Torquay Athletic formed. The club has for many years used 1875 as the official date based on the recollections of founder Harry Gray whose memories formed the basis of a publication in 1925. Gray actually said that he attended regatta sports in Brixham in 1875 which “eventually” led to the formation of the club. The actual formation of the Torquay Athletic and Football Club was announced in the Torquay Times of 19 August 1876, the announcement signed by H.J. Gray 15 August 1876. Ray Batten's book "A History of Torquay Athletic R.F.C." implies that the club not formed until 1886 because the earlier incarnation was a different organisation. He is correct in the strictest interpretation. The old club became defunct in 1885, with the Excelsior and Ellacombe clubs coming together to form a “phoenix club” in 1886. The club was commonly known by the same name, played at the same ground - Plainmoor - and had the same club president Dr Hamilton Ramsey. Reports of annual dinners make it clear that Hamilton Ramsey regarded the two clubs as one entity. In 1890 the club reached the final of the Devon Senior Cup losing 6–10 to Exeter at the County Ground. Seven years later the club were back in a final, this time in the Devon Junior Cup, with the Athletic reserve side winning the cup. In 1904 Torquay Athletic moved to the Recreation Ground, replacing Torquay United, who had been tenants there for the previous four years. The rugby club have occupied the ground ever since, renting it from Torquay Town Council, and sharing it with the local cricket club since 1926, with occasional Devon CCC cricket games also played there. The Recreation Ground itself remains relatively unchanged since it first opened back in the 1888 and remains a great example of the grounds of the period.

With a permanent home in place Torquay Athletic would establish itself as one of the better sides in the county and in 1907 the club won the Devon Senior Cup for the first time in the club's history. Winning the cup, would not however prove to be a catalyst for success, as Athletic would fall behind the dominant sides of the time, Devonport Albion and Plymouth RFC (parent clubs of Plymouth Albion). The club had to wait 63 years for their next senior cup win, eventually reclaiming it for the second time in 1979.

=== League rugby ===
The advent of the national leagues in 1987 saw Torquay Athletic placed in South West Division 1 - division 5 of the English rugby union league system. League rugby was not initially successful for the club as after only two seasons they were relegated to South West 2. They bounced back the following year as they were promoted from South West 2 after claiming the runners up spot. The rest of the nineties was a period of stability for the club as they kept afloat in South West Division 1 and they also reached the final of the Devon Senior Cup in 1998 losing against Tiverton despite having home advantage.

The start of the 21st century proved to be an interesting one for Athletic as they yo-yoed up and down the league system. They suffered two relegation's in three years, first from South West Division 1 at the end of 2001 and then South West 2 West in 2003, to fall to the lowest league position in their history. After a bad start to the decade Athletic bounced back, just missing out on promotion by losing the playoff 7–18 away to Gloucester-based side, Spartans in 2004 before winning Western Counties West in 2005–06. They also won the Devon Senior Cup for the third time in 2007, defeating Paignton in the final. Success in the cup was not replicated in the league and in 2010 Torquay Athletic were once more relegated. Two years later they came close to promotion after finishing second in Tribute Western Counties West, but were comfortably beaten 7–39 away to another Gloucester based side, Old Centralians.

The 2017–18 season would see Torquay once again suffer the agony of relegation, going down on the last day of the season to drop to level 8 (Tribute Cornwall/Devon) - the lowest level that they have played at since the leagues began.

== Grounds ==
In the club's first season, they only played in-house games at Daddyhole Plain. From 1877 to 1881, they practised at Daddyhole but played home games on Paignton Green. For 1881–82, they played at a field in Plainmoor between Cary Park, Manor Road and Warberry Lane (now called Warbro Road). In 1882, they crossed Warberry Lane to play for the first time at the Plainmoor ground which is now home to Torquay United. The club was extinct 1885–86. The new club returned to Plainmoor for a season and a half before spending half a season at Hengrave, Shiphay. In 1888, they moved in to the brand new Recreation Ground. A financial dispute between Athletic and the Recreation Ground Company meant that 1890-91 was played at Paignton Cycle track behind the Esplanade Hotel (now the Inn on the Green). Athletic returned to the Rec in 1891 but stayed just one season before moving back to Plainmoor. A wooden grandstand was built and Athletic stayed for twelve seasons 1892–1904. In 1903, the club was served with twelve months’ notice by the Cary Estate. A battle ensued with the relatively young Torquay United club who had used the Rec since 1900. Rugby was the more established game at the time, although association was growing fast, and so Athletic prevailed. They moved back to the Rec in September 1904 and have stayed there ever since.

The Recreation Ground is located on Rathmore Road in Torquay, near to the sea front and next to the train station. It consists of a rugby/cricket pitch alongside a Victorian-era grandstand underneath which is the club-house and changing facilities, while a stand-alone cricket pavilion and scoreboard is situated at the opposite end of the ground. Parking is available at the ground.

The ground capacity for both rugby and cricket is around 3,000, most of which is standing, including 300 seats in the grandstand. The grandstand originally had seating for 600 but at present only half of it is used as the other half has fallen into ruin and is unsafe for spectators.

== Season summary ==
| Season | League | | | National Cup(s) | | County Cup(s) | |
| Season | Competition/Level | Position | Points | Competition | Performance | Competition | Performance |
|---|---|---|---|---|---|---|---|
| 1987–88 | South West 1 (5) | | | | | | |
| 1988–89 | South West 1 (5) | (relegated) | | | | | |
| 1989–90 | South West 2 (6) | 2nd (promoted) | | | | | |
| 1990–91 | South West 1 (5) | | | Pilkington Cup | 1st Round | | |
| 1991–92 | South West 1 (5) | | | Pilkington Cup | 1st Round | | |
| 1992–93 | South West 1 (5) | | | | | | |
| 1993–94 | South West 1 (6) (Note: RFU restructuring of the English rugby union system for the 1993–94 season due to the creation Courage League Division 5 meant that South West 1 became a tier 6 league.) | | | | | | |
| 1994–95 | South West 1 (6) | | | | | | |
| 1995–96 | South West 1 (6) | | | | | | |
| 1996–97 | South West 1 (5) (Note: The cancellation of Courage League Division 5 at the end of the 1995–96 season meant that South West 1 once again became a tier 5 league.) | 6th | 21 | | | | |
| 1997–98 | South West 1 (5) | 9th | 16 | | | Devon Senior Cup | Runners up |
| 1998–99 | South West 1 (5) | 11th (Note: Only one team was relegated from South West 1 at the end of the 1998–99 season, meaning that 11th placed Torquay Athletic were kept safe.) | 9 | Tetley's Bitter Cup | 1st Round | | |
| 1999–00 | South West 1 (5) | 9th | 16 | | | | |
| 2000–01 | South West 1 (5) | 11th (relegated) | 7 | | | | |
| 2001–02 | South West 2 West (6) | 10th | 14 | | | | |
| 2002–03 | South West 2 West (6) | 11th (relegated) | 12 | | | | |
| 2003–04 | Western Counties West (7) | 2nd (lost playoff) | 32 | Powergen Intermediate Cup | 1st Round | | |
| 2004–05 | Western Counties West (7) | 4th | 26 | Powergen Intermediate Cup | | | |
| 2005–06 | Western Counties West (7) | 1st (promoted) | 38 | Powergen Trophy | 1st Round | | |
| 2006–07 | South West 2 West (6) | 3rd | 28 | EDF Intermediate Cup | | Devon Senior Cup | Winners |
| 2007–08 | South West 2 West (6) | 4th | 26 | EDF Energy Trophy | 1st Round | | |
| 2008–09 | South West 2 West (6) | 8th | 17 | EDF Intermediate Cup | | | |
| 2009–10 | South West 1 West (6) (Note: RFU restructuring of the English rugby union system for the 2009–10 season saw South West 2 West renamed as South West 1 West.) | 12th (relegated) | 16 | | | | |
| 2010–11 | Western Counties West (7) | 6th | 74 (Note: The 2010–11 season would see the introduction of bonus points into lower league English rugby union (tier 6 and below).) | | | Devon Intermediate Plate | Winners |
| 2011–12 | Western Counties West (7) | 2nd (lost playoff) | 93 | | | Devon Intermediate Cup | Semi-finals |
| 2012–13 | Western Counties West (7) | 4th | 80 | RFU Intermediate Cup | 5th Round | Devon Senior Cup | 1st Round |
| 2013–14 | Western Counties West (7) | 7th | 60 | | | Devon Intermediate Cup | 2nd Round |
| 2014–15 | Western Counties West (7) | 12th | 36 | | | Devon Intermediate Cup | 1st Round |
| 2015–16 | Western Counties West (7) | 5th | 78 | | | Devon Intermediate Cup | 2nd Round |
| 2016–17 | Western Counties West (7) | 9th | 55 | RFU Intermediate Cup | 4th Round | | |
| 2017–18 | Western Counties West (7) | 13th (relegated) | 47 | | | Devon Intermediate Cup | Semi-finals |
| 2018–19 | Cornwall/Devon (8) | 5th | 84 | | | Devon Intermediate Shield | 3rd |
| 2019–20 | Cornwall/Devon (8) | 7th | 64.97 (Note: The season was postponed and ultimately cancelled due to the COVID-19 pandemic in the United Kingdom with Torquay sitting in 7th, having played 20 games and gained 56 points. The remaining games were calculated on a 'best playing record formula', with Torquay remaining in 7th place with 64.97 points.) | | | Devon Intermediate Shield | |
| 2020–21 | Cornwall/Devon (8) | | | | | Devon Intermediate Shield | |
Green background stands for either league champions (with promotion) or cup winners. Blue background stands for promotion without winning league or losing cup finalists. Pink background stands for relegation.

== Honours ==
First Team

- Devon RFU Senior Cup winners (3): 1907, 1979, 2007
- Tribute Western Counties West champions: 2005–06
- Devon Intermediate Plate winners: 2011
- Devon Intermediate Shield winners: 2023
- Devon Intermediate Cup winners: 2024

Second Team

- Devon Junior Cup winners: 1897

== Notable former players ==
- Chris Bell - Plymouth born Centre who played youth rugby at Athletic before going to forge a career in the Premiership with clubs including Harlequins and Wasps. Also gained youth international caps for England.
- Mike Davis - Torquay born Lock who played at Athletic in his youth and went to gain 16 caps for England at lock as well as coaching the national side from 1979 to 1982.
- Lee Mears - Torquay born Hooker who started with Torquay Athletic minis before going on to have a successful career with Bath as well as gaining 42 caps for England and 4 caps for the British and Irish Lions.
- Cecil Pritchard - capped 8 times by Wales in the 1920s. Played part of his career at Torquay and Barnstaple after moving to the south-west from his home country. Died in 1966.
- Gwyn Richards - fly-half who played for the club in the 1920s after spending much of his early career in his native Wales with the likes of Bridgend RFC and Cardiff RFC. Gained a solitary cap for Wales in 1927 before switching to rugby league. Died in 1985.
- (England) John Widdicombe - local lad who went on to play for Newport in Wales as well as being called up by Barbarians. Now forwards coach at the club.

== See also ==
- Devon RFU
