= Counties 1 Western West =

English rugby union league

- Current season or competition: 2025–26 Counties 1 Western West
- Sport: Rugby union
- Instituted: 1987; 39 years ago (as Western Counties)
- Number of teams: 12
- Country: England
- Holders: 'Wiveliscombe (1st title) (2025–26 – promoted to Regional 2 South West)
- Most titles: Penryn (3 titles)
- Website: clubs.rfu.com

Counties 1 Western West (known as Counties 1 Tribute Ale Western West for sponsorship reasons) is an English rugby union league. Originally a single division called Western Counties, in 1996 the division split into two regional leagues called Western Counties North and Western Counties West. Western Counties West was renamed Counties 1 Western West prior to the 2022–23 season and is currently a seventh tier league for clubs based in the south-west of England; mainly Cornwall, Devon and Somerset. The champions are promoted to Regional 2 South West. The number of teams relegated depends on feedback following promotion and relegation in the leagues above, but can be one, two or three, to either Counties 2 Cornwall, Counties 2 Devon or Counties 2 Somerset, depending on location.

'Wiveliscombe are the 2025–26 champions.

== Format ==
The champions are promoted to Regional 2 South West (formerly South West 1 West), while the last two teams, depending on their location, are relegated to Counties 2 Cornwall, Counties 2 Devon or Counties 2 Somerset. In previous seasons teams were relegated to the Cornwall/Devon league. The season runs from September to April and comprises twenty-two rounds of matches, with each club playing each of its rivals, home and away. The results of the matches contribute points to the league as follows:

- 4 points are awarded for a win
- 2 points are awarded for a draw
- 0 points are awarded for a loss, however
- 1 losing (bonus) point is awarded to a team that loses a match by 7 points or fewer
- 1 additional (bonus) point is awarded to a team scoring 4 tries or more in a match.

== 2026–27 ==
Departing were Wiveliscombe promoted to Regional 2 South West while Penryn (11th) and Plymstock Albion Oaks (12th) were relegated to Counties 2 Cornwall and Counties 1 Devon respectively.

Team	Ground	Capacity	Town/Area	Previous season
Barnstaple II	Pottingham Road	2,000 (575 seats)	Barnstaple, Devon	3rd
Camborne II	Crane Park (Note: Also known as the Recreation Ground.)	7,000 (780 seats)	Camborne, Cornwall	Promoted from Counties 2 Cornwall (1st)
Cullompton	Stafford Park		Cullompton, Devon	Relegated from Regional 2 South West (12th)
Devonport Services II	The Rectory	2,000	Devonport, Plymouth, Devon	Promoted from Counties 2 Devon (1st)
Kingsbridge	High House	1,000 (50 seats)	Kingsbridge, Devon	8th
Newton Abbot	Rackerhayes	1,150 (150 stand)	Newton Abbot, Devon	9th
Paignton	Queen's Park	1,650 (150 seats)	Paignton, Devon	2nd
Redruth II	The Recreation Ground	3,500 (580 seats)	Redruth, Cornwall	6th
Saltash	Moorlands Lane		Saltash, Cornwall	10th
St Ives	Recreation Ground	3,000 (275 seats)	St Ives, Cornwall	7th
Torquay Athletic	Recreation Ground	3,000 (300 seats)	Torquay, Devon	4th
Truro	St Clement's Hill	2,000	Truro, Cornwall	5th

Locations of the 2026–27 Counties 1 Western West teams in Cornwall
Locations of the 2026–27 Counties 1 Western West teams in Devon & Somerset

== 2025–26 ==
=== Participating teams and locations ===
Teams are based in south-west England, with six from Devon, five from Cornwall and one from Somerset. Eight of the teams played in last seasons competition, departing were the champions Pirates Amateurs promoted to Regional 2 South West, while Bude (10th) were relegated to Counties 2 Cornwall and Tavistock (11th) and Bideford (12th) were relegated to Counties 2 Devon. Incoming teams were Truro (11th) and Newton Abbot (12th) both relegated from Regional 2 South West. Teams promoted to the league were Saltash and Torquay, both champions of Counties 2 Cornwall and Counties 2 Devon respectively.

Team	Ground	Capacity	Town/Area	Previous season
Barnstaple II	Pottingham Road	2,000 (575 seats)	Barnstaple, Devon	3rd
Kingsbridge	High House	1,000 (50 seats)	Kingsbridge, Devon	7th
Newton Abbot	Rackerhayes	1,150 (150 stand)	Newton Abbot, Devon	Relegated from Regional 2 South West (12th)
Paignton	Queen's Park	1,650 (150 seats)	Paignton, Devon	2nd
Penryn	Memorial Ground	4,000 (200 seats)	Penryn, Cornwall	9th
Plymstock Albion Oaks	Horsham Playing Fields		Staddiscombe, Plymouth	4th
Redruth II	The Recreation Ground	3,500 (580 seats)	Redruth, Cornwall	5th
Saltash	Moorlands Lane		Saltash, Cornwall	Promoted from Counties 2 Cornwall (1st)
St Ives	Recreation Ground	3,000 (275 seats)	St Ives, Cornwall	8th
Torquay Athletic	Recreation Ground	3,000 (300 seats)	Torquay, Devon	Promoted from Counties 2 Devon (1st)
Truro	St Clement's Hill	2,000	Truro, Cornwall	Relegated from Regional 2 South West (11th)
Wiveliscombe	Recreational Ground		Wiveliscombe, Somerset	6th

Locations of the 2025–26 Counties 1 Western West teams in Cornwall
Locations of the 2025–26 Counties 1 Western West teams in Devon & Somerset

=== League table ===
2025–26 Counties 1 Western West League Table
		Played	Won	Drawn	Lost	Points for	Points against	Points diff	Try bonus	Loss bonus	Points
1	Wiveliscombe (P)	22	18	0	4	735	450	285	16	2	90
2	Paignton	22	16	0	6	838	602	236	20	2	86
3	Barnstaple II	22	11	2	9	598	536	62	14	5	67
4	Torquay Athletic	22	12	1	9	650	533	117	13	3	66
5	Truro	22	12	1	9	541	573	−32	14	1	65
6	Redruth II	22	12	0	10	629	681	−52	15	2	65
7	St Ives	22	11	0	11	524	548	−24	14	2	60
8	Kingsbridge	22	10	0	12	535	599	−64	12	5	57
9	Newton Abbot	22	8	0	14	606	705	−99	15	4	51
10	Saltash	22	6	0	15	566	618	−52	12	11	47
11	Penryn (R)	22	6	0	16	543	672	−129	13	8	45
12	Plymstock Albion Oaks (R)	22	8	0	14	505	753	−248	9	2	43
If teams are level at any stage, tiebreakers are applied in the following order: 1. Number of matches won 2. Difference between points for and against 3. Total number of points for 4. Aggregate number of points scored in matches between tied teams 5. Number of matches won excluding the first match, then the second and so on until the tie is settled
Green background is the promotion place. Pink background are relegation places. Updated: 29 May 2026

== 2024–25 ==
The champions Tiverton were promoted to Regional 2 South West, while Falmouth (12th) were relegated to Counties 2 Cornwall. Barnstaple II and Redruth II were promoted from Counties 2 Devon and Counties 2 Cornwall respectively. Six of the teams are from Devon, five from Cornwall and one from Somerset. Ten of last seasons twelve teams played in that season's competition.

=== Participating teams and location ===
Team	Ground	Capacity	Town/Area	Previous season
Barnstaple II	Pottingham Road	2,000 (575 seats)	Barnstaple, Devon	Promoted from Counties 2 Devon (1st)
Bideford	King George's Field	2,000	Bideford, Devon	9th
Bude	Bencoolen Meadow	750	Bude, Cornwall	11th
Kingsbridge	High House	1,000 (50 seats)	Kingsbridge, Devon	4th
Paignton	Queen's Park	1,650 (150 seats)	Paignton, Devon	2nd
Penryn	Memorial Ground	4,000 (200 seats)	Penryn, Cornwall	6th
Pirates Amateurs	Mennaye Field	4,000 (2,200 seats)	Penzance, Cornwall	5th
Plymstock Albion Oaks	Horsham Playing Fields		Staddiscombe, Plymouth	3rd
Redruth II	The Recreation Ground	3,500 (580 seats)	Redruth, Cornwall	Promoted from Counties 2 Cornwall (1st)
St Ives	Recreation Ground	3,000 (275 seats)	St Ives	8th
Tavistock	Sandy Park	500	Tavistock, Devon	7th
Wiveliscombe	Recreational Ground		Wiveliscombe, Somerset	10th

Locations of the 2024–25 Counties 1 Western West teams in Cornwall
Locations of the 2024–25 Counties 1 Western West teams in Devon & Somerset

=== League table ===
2024–25 Counties 1 Western West League Table
		Played	Won	Drawn	Lost	Points for	Points against	Points diff	Try bonus	Loss bonus	Points
1	Pirates Amateurs (P)	22	19	0	3	700	353	347	16	2	96
2	Paignton	22	17	2	3	883	462	421	19	1	93
3	Barnstaple II	22	16	0	6	745	383	362	16	4	84
4	Plymstock Albion Oaks	22	14	0	8	786	501	285	15	2	73
5	Redruth II	22	13	0	9	582	480	102	10	1	63
6	Wiveliscombe	22	12	0	10	537	439	98	10	2	61
7	Kingsbridge	22	10	1	11	626	562	64	13	1	51
8	St Ives	22	9	1	12	508	566	−58	10	3	46
9	Penryn	22	8	0	14	448	699	−251	8	2	42
10	Bude	22	7	0	15	502	725	−223	11	3	42
11	Tavistock	22	3	0	19	285	1028	−743	4	3	19
12	Bideford	22	2	0	20	305	709	−404	2	3	8
If teams are level at any stage, tiebreakers are applied in the following order: 1. Number of matches won 2. Difference between points for and against 3. Total number of points for 4. Aggregate number of points scored in matches between tied teams 5. Number of matches won excluding the first match, then the second and so on until the tie is settled
Green background is the promotion place. Pink background are relegation places (subject to confirmation by the RFU. Updated:21 April 2025

== 2023–24 ==
Departing were Topsham and Cullompton, promoted to Regional 2 South West. There was no relegation.

=== Participating teams and location ===
Team	Ground	Capacity	Town/Area	Previous season
Bideford	King George's Field	2,000	Bideford, Devon	8th
Bude	Bencoolen Meadow	750	Bude, Cornwall	10th
Falmouth	Recreation Ground	3,000	Falmouth, Cornwall	12th
Kingsbridge	High House	1,000 (50 seats)	Kingsbridge, Devon	3rd
Paignton	Queen's Park	1,650 (150 seats)	Paignton, Devon	11th
Penryn	Memorial Ground	4,000 (200 seats)	Penryn, Cornwall	7th
Pirates Amateurs	Mennaye Field	4,000 (2,200 seats)	Penzance, Cornwall	4th
Plymstock Albion Oaks	Horsham Playing Fields		Staddiscombe, Plymouth	9th
St Ives	Recreation Ground	3,000 (275 seats)	St Ives	Promoted from Counties 2 Cornwall (1st)
Tavistock	Sandy Park	500	Tavistock, Devon	Promoted from Counties 2 Devon (1st)
Tiverton	Coronation Field	2750 (250 seated)	Tiverton, Devon	5th
Wiveliscombe	Recreational Ground		Wiveliscombe, Somerset	6th

Locations of the 2023–24 Counties 1 Western West teams in Cornwall
Locations of the 2023–24 Counties 1 Western West teams in Devon & Somerset

=== League table ===
2023–24 Counties 1 Western West League Table
		Played	Won	Drawn	Lost	Points for	Points against	Points diff	Try bonus	Loss bonus	Points
1	Tiverton (P)	22	18	0	4	750	280	470	12	2	87
2	Paignton	22	17	1	4	777	487	290	15	2	87
3	Plymstock Albion Oaks	22	14	0	8	750	476	274	18	4	78
4	Kingsbridge	22	14	0	8	656	452	204	15	3	75
5	Pirate Amateurs	22	12	0	10	632	543	89	14	5	67
6	Penryn	22	14	0	8	474	455	19	7	0	63
7	Tavisock	22	9	1	12	566	609	−43	13	6	57
8	St Ives	22	11	1	10	371	473	−102	8	0	54
9	Bideford	22	7	0	15	373	578	−205	7	4	39
10	Wiveliscombe	22	6	0	16	436	604	−168	5	5	34
11	Bude	22	5	0	17	382	769	−387	6	2	28
12	Falmouth (R)	22	3	1	18	326	767	−441	2	5	21
Points are awarded as follows: four points for a win; two points for a draw; no points for a loss; one bonus point for scoring four tries or more in a match; one bonus point for losing by seven points or less.; If teams are level at any stage, tiebreakers are applied in the following order: 1. Number of matches won 2. Difference between points for and against 3. Total number of points for 4. Aggregate number of points scored in matches between tied teams
Green background is the promotion place. Pink background are relegation places. Updated:15 July 2024

== 2022–23 ==
=== Participating teams and location ===
Team	Ground	Capacity	Town/Area	Previous season
Bideford	King George's Field	2,000	Bideford, Devon	Western Counties West (11th)
Bude	Bencoolen Meadow	750	Bude, Cornwall	Promoted from Cornwall/Devon League (4th)
Cullompton	Stafford Park		Cullompton, Devon	Promoted from Cornwall/Devon League (3rd)
Falmouth	Recreation Ground	3,000	Falmouth, Cornwall	Western Counties West (13th)
Kingsbridge	High House	1,000 (50 seats)	Kingsbridge, Devon	Western Counties West (7th)
Paignton	Queen's Park	1,650 (150 seats)	Paignton, Devon	Western Counties West (12th)
Penryn	Memorial Ground	4,000 (200 seats)	Penryn, Cornwall	Western Counties West (10th)
Pirates Amateurs	Mennaye Field	4,000 (2,200 seats)	Penzance, Cornwall	Promoted from Cornwall/Devon League (champions)
Plymstock Albion Oaks	Horsham Playing Fields		Staddiscombe, Plymouth	Promoted from Cornwall/Devon League (5th)
Tiverton	Coronation Field	2750 (250 seated)	Tiverton, Devon	Western Counties West (8th)
Topsham	Bonfire Field		Topsham, Exeter	Promoted from Cornwall/Devon League (runner-up)
Wiveliscombe	Recreational Ground		Wiveliscombe, Somerset	Western Counties West (9th)

Locations of the 2022–23 Counties 1 Western West teams in Cornwall
Locations of the 2022–23 Counties 1 Western West teams in Devon & Somerset

=== League table ===
2022–23 Counties 1 Western West League Table
		Played	Won	Drawn	Lost	Points for	Points against	Points diff	Try bonus	Loss bonus	Points
1	Topsham (P)	22	20	0	2	912	421	421	16	1	97
2	Cullompton (P)	22	19	0	3	932	306	626	15	3	95
3	Kingsbridge	22	14	0	8	664	493	171	14	3	73
4	Pirates Amateur	22	13	1	8	698	524	174	14	4	72
5	Tiverton	22	13	1	8	577	486	91	11	4	69
6	Wiveliscombe	22	11	0	11	586	525	61	9	3	56
7	Penryn	22	9	1	12	618	662	−44	13	5	56
8	Bideford	22	10	0	12	446	598	−152	8	3	52
9	Plymstock Albion Oaks	22	9	0	13	554	658	−104	9	4	49
10	Bude	22	7	0	15	427	771	−344	8	4	40
11	Paignton	22	5	1	16	524	687	−163	8	7	37
12	Falmouth	22	0	0	22	242	1049	−807	3	1	4
Points are awarded as follows: four points for a win; two points for a draw; no points for a loss; one bonus point for scoring four tries or more in a match; one bonus point for losing by seven points or less.; If teams are level at any stage, tiebreakers are applied in the following order: 1. Number of matches won 2. Difference between points for and against 3. Total number of points for 4. Aggregate number of points scored in matches between tied teams
Green background is the promotion place. Pink background are relegation places. Updated:1 July 2023

== 2021–22 ==
=== Participating teams and location ===
Team	Ground	Capacity	Town/Area	Previous season
Bideford	King George's Field	2,000	Bideford, Devon	8th
Burnham-on-Sea	BASC Ground		Burnham-on-Sea, Somerset	Promoted from Somerset Premier
Chard	The Park, Essex Close		Chard, Somerset	7th
Falmouth	Recreation Ground	3,000	Falmouth, Cornwall	10th
Honiton	Allhallows Playing Field		Honiton, Devon	11th
Kingsbridge	High House	1,000 (50 seats)	Kingsbridge, Devon	4th
Newton Abbot	Rackerhayes	1,150 (150 stand)	Newton Abbot, Devon	Relegated from South West 1 West
Paignton	Queen's Park	1,650 (150 seats)	Paignton, Devon	Promoted from Cornwall/Devon League (runners-up)
Penryn	Memorial Ground	4,000 (200 seats)	Penryn, Cornwall	6th
Teignmouth	Bitton Park Sports Ground	1,210 (210 stand)	Teignmouth, Devon	3rd
Tiverton	Coronation Field	2750 (250 seated)	Tiverton, Devon	9th
Truro	St Clement's Hill	2,000	Truro, Cornwall	Promoted from Cornwall/Devon League (champions)
Wadebridge Camels	Molesworth Field	500	Wadebridge, Cornwall	5th
Wiveliscombe	Recreational Ground		Wiveliscombe, Somerset	13th

Locations of the 2021–22 Western Counties West teams

=== League table ===
2021–22 Western Counties West League Table
		Played	Won	Drawn	Lost	Points for	Points against	Points diff	Try bonus	Loss bonus	Points	Points adj
1	Wadebridge Camels	26	26	0	0	1136	410	726	24	0	128	
2	Truro	26	18	1	7	768	550	218	17	1	92	
3	Newton Abbot	26	17	1	8	828	576	252	18	3	92	
4	Teignmouth	26	15	2	9	794	524	270	15	4	83	
5	Chard	26	15	0	11	748	545	203	18	5	83	
6	Burnham-on-Sea	26	15	0	11	818	529	289	19	4	78	−5
7	Kingsbridge	26	14	1	11	836	532	304	16	3	72	−5
8	Tiverton	26	13	2	11	586	656	−70	10	2	68	
9	Wiveliscombe	26	11	1	14	567	628	−61	10	4	60	
10	Penryn	26	10	2	14	575	599	−24	10	3	59	
11	Bideford	26	8	1	17	438	740	−302	6	5	45	
12	Paignton	26	8	0	18	470	716	−246	5	2	39	
13	Falmouth	26	4	1	21	363	973	−610	5	1	24	
14	Honiton	26	2	0	24	380	1329	−949	5	0	13	
Points are awarded as follows: four points for a win; two points for a draw; no points for a loss; one bonus point for scoring four tries or more in a match; one bonus point for losing by seven points or less.; If teams are level at any stage, tiebreakers are applied in the following order: 1. Number of matches won 2. Difference between points for and against 3. Total number of points for 4. Aggregate number of points scored in matches between tied teams
Green background is the promotion place. Pink background are relegation places. Updated:7 August 2022

== 2020–21 ==
Due to the coronavirus pandemic the season was cancelled.

== 2019–20 ==
=== Participating teams and location ===
Team	Ground	Capacity	Town/Area	Previous season
Bideford	King George's Field	2,000	Bideford, Devon	10th
Chard	The Park, Essex Close		Chard, Somerset	12th
Cullompton	Stafford Park		Cullompton, Devon	Relegated from South West 1 West (13th)
Falmouth	Recreation Ground	3,000	Falmouth, Cornwall	7th
Honiton	Allhallows Playing Field		Honiton, Devon	Promoted from Cornwall/Devon (runner-up)
Kingsbridge	High House	1,000 (50 seats)	Kingsbridge, Devon	8th
Penryn	Memorial Ground	4,000 (200 seats)	Penryn, Cornwall	Promoted from Cornwall/Devon (champions)
Saltash	Moorlands Lane		Saltash, Cornwall	11th
St Austell	Tregorrick Park	4,000 (300 seats)	St Austell, Cornwall	4th
Teignmouth	Bitton Park Sports Ground	1,210 (210 stand)	Teignmouth, Devon	Relegated from South West 1 West (12th)
Tiverton	Coronation Field	750	Tiverton, Devon	5th
Wadebridge Camels	Molesworth Field	500	Wadebridge, Cornwall	6th
Wellington	Athletic Ground		Wellington, Somerset	3rd
Wiveliscombe	Recreational Ground		Wiveliscombe, Somerset	Promoted from Somerset Premier (champions)

Locations of the 2019–20 Western Counties West teams

=== League table ===
2019–20 Western Counties West League Table (to 16 March 2020, when play stopped due to COVID-19) / Final Positions
		Played	Won	Drawn	Lost	Points for	Points against	Points diff	Try bonus	Loss bonus	Points	Final position	Team	Points (adjusted)
1	St Austell	22	19	0	3	654	334	320	12	2	90	1	Wellington (P)	107
2	Wellington (P)	20	16	0	4	582	324	258	14	3	81	2	St Austell	106
3	Kingsbridge	22	14	0	8	736	399	337	15	4	75	3	Teignmouth	94
4	Teignmouth	19	13	1	5	534	304	230	9	5	68	4	Kingsbridge	89
5	Wadebridge Camels	21	13	1	7	548	418	130	7	4	65	5	Wadebridge Camels	80
6	Penryn	22	13	0	9	516	378	138	9	4	65	6	Penryn	74
7	Chard	21	11	1	9	473	562	−89	8	3	57	7	Chard	72
8	Bideford	21	10	1	10	373	420	−47	9	1	52	8	Bideford	63
9	Tiverton	22	8	1	13	319	522	−203	3	2	39	9	Tiverton	46
10	Falmouth	22	7	1	14	360	530	−170	5	2	37	10	Falmouth	44
11	Honiton	22	7	0	15	366	615	−249	4	5	37	11	Honiton	42
12	Wiveliscombe	22	5	0	17	362	689	−327	6	6	32	12	Saltash	39
13	Saltash	20	6	0	14	388	538	−150	4	2	30	13	Wiveliscombe	39
14	Cullompton	22	4	0	18	369	547	−178	5	8	29	14	Cullompton	34
Points are awarded as follows: four points for a win; two points for a draw; no points for a loss; one bonus point for scoring four tries or more in a match; one bonus point for losing by seven points or less.; If teams are level at any stage, tiebreakers are applied in the following order: 1. Number of matches won 2. Difference between points for and against 3. Total number of points for 4. Aggregate number of points scored in matches between tied teams
Green background is the promotion place. Blue background is the play-off place. Pink background are relegation places. Updated: 2 April 2021

== 2018–19 ==
=== Participating teams and location ===
Team	Ground	Capacity	Town/Area	Previous season
Bideford	King George's Field	2,000	Bideford, Devon	Relegated from South West 1 West (13th)
Chard	The Park, Essex Close		Chard, Somerset	7th
Crediton	Blagdon		Crediton, Devon	10th
Falmouth	Recreation Ground	3,000	Falmouth, Cornwall	12th
Kingsbridge	High House	1,000 (50 seats)	Kingsbridge, Devon	4th
Paignton	Queen's Park	1,650 (150 seats)	Paignton, Devon	9th
Saltash	Moorlands Lane		Saltash, Cornwall	Promoted from Cornwall/Devon (runner-up)
Sidmouth	Blackmore Field		Sidmouth, Devon	6th
St Austell	Tregorrick Park	4,000 (300 seats)	St Austell, Cornwall	3rd
Tiverton	Coronation Field	750	Tiverton, Devon	11th
Truro	St Clement's Hill	2,000	Truro, Cornwall	8th
Wadebridge Camels	Molesworth Field	500	Wadebridge, Cornwall	5th
Wellington	Athletic Ground		Wellington, Somerset	Promoted from Cornwall/Devon (champions)
Winscombe	Recreation Ground	1,200	Winscombe, Somerset	Level transfer from Western Counties North (11th)

Locations of the 2018–19 Western Counties West teams

=== League table ===
2018–19 Western Counties West League Table
		Played	Won	Drawn	Lost	Points for	Points against	Points diff	Try bonus	Loss bonus	Points	Points (adjusted)
1	Sidmouth (P)	26	20	2	4	805	406	399	17	2	103	
2	Crediton (P)	26	21	2	3	643	423	220	12	1	101	
3	Wellington	26	20	3	3	816	402	414	17	2	100	−5
4	St Austell	26	17	2	7	597	392	205	14	7	93	
5	Tiverton	26	13	1	12	605	547	58	9	6	69	
6	Wadebridge Camels	26	13	1	12	554	644	−90	9	3	66	
7	Falmouth	26	12	1	13	468	625	−157	6	1	57	
8	Kingsbridge	26	9	1	16	502	548	−46	7	8	53	
9	Winscombe	26	10	0	16	453	605	−152	5	6	51	
10	Bideford	26	8	1	17	495	485	10	7	8	49	
11	Saltash	26	9	0	17	396	626	−230	3	7	46	
12	Chard	26	8	0	18	456	796	−340	8	3	43	
13	Truro	26	7	3	16	491	651	−160	4	4	42	
14	Paignton	26	6	1	19	350	481	−131	1	9	36	
If teams are level at any stage, tiebreakers are applied in the following order: 1. Number of matches won 2. Difference between points for and against 3. Total number of points for 4. Aggregate number of points scored in matches between tied teams 5. Number of matches won excluding the first match, then the second and so on until the tie is settled
Green background is the promotion place. Blue background is the play-off place. Pink background are relegation places. Updated: 13 February 2021

=== Promotion play-off ===
In the play-off for promotion, Crediton played Midsomer Norton from Western Counties North for promotion to South West 1 West. Midsomer Norton had the best playing record and hosted the match, losing 15 – 19. This was the first time either team had participated in the play-offs, at this level, and Crediton's win was the sixth time the away team had won match. Teams from Western Counties North lead 10–9 in the nineteen play-off matches played since 2001.

	Played	Won	Drawn	Lost	Points for	Points against	Points diff	Try bonus	Loss bonus	Points
Midsomer Norton	26	20	0	6	750	595	155	20	2	102
Crediton (P)	26	21	2	3	643	423	220	12	1	101

27 April 2019
15:00

Midsomer Norton	15–19	Crediton

Norton Down Playing Fields, Midsomer Norton, Somerset

== 2017–18 ==
=== Participating teams and location ===
The 2017–18 Western Counties West League consists of fourteen teams; seven from Devon, five from Cornwall and two from Somerset. The season started on 2 September 2017 and finished on 21 April 2018. Ten of the fourteen teams participated in last season's competition. The 2016–17 champions, Exeter University were promoted to South West 1 West, along with the play-off winners Cullompton, while Chard (12th place) and Kingsbridge (13th) were relegated from that league. Bude and Wellington were relegated to the Cornwall/Devon League and were replaced by Falmouth (champions) and Paignton (runner-up).

Team	Ground	Capacity	Town/City	Previous season
Burnham-on-Sea	BASC Ground		Burnham-on-Sea, Somerset	12th
Chard	The Park, Essex Close		Chard, Somerset	Relegated from South West 1 West (12th)
Crediton	Blagdon		Crediton, Devon	10th
Devonport Services	The Rectory	2,000	Devonport, Plymouth, Devon	3rd
Falmouth	Recreation Ground	3,000	Falmouth, Cornwall	Promoted from Cornwall/Devon (champions)
Kingsbridge	High House	1,000 (50 seats)	Kingsbridge, Devon	Relegated from South West 1 West (13th)
Paignton	Queen's Park	1,650 (150 seats)	Paignton, Devon	Promoted from Cornwall/Devon (runner-up)
St Austell	Tregorrick Park	4,000 (300 seats)	St Austell, Cornwall	7th
St Ives	Recreation Ground	3,000 (275 seats)	St Ives, Cornwall	6th
Sidmouth	Blackmore Field		Sidmouth, Devon	8th
Tiverton	Coronation Field	750	Tiverton, Devon	11th
Torquay Athletic	Recreation Ground	3,000 (300 seats)	Torquay, Devon	9th
Truro	St Clement's Hill	2,000	Truro, Cornwall	4th
Wadebridge Camels	Molesworth Field	500	Wadebridge, Cornwall	5th

Locations of the 2017–18 Western Counties West teams in Cornwall
Locations of the 2017–18 Western Counties West teams in Devon and Somerset

=== League table ===
2017–18 Western Counties West League Table
		Played	Won	Drawn	Lost	Points for	Points against	Points diff	Try bonus	Loss bonus	Points	Points (adjusted)
1	St Ives (P)	26	22	0	4	809	478	331	20	1	109	
2	Devonport Services (P)	26	17	1	8	719	456	263	14	6	90	
3	St Austell	26	17	1	8	598	444	154	8	5	83	
4	Kingsbridge	26	16	2	8	714	391	323	11	3	82	
5	Wadebridge Camels	26	15	3	8	596	527	69	8	1	75	
6	Sidmouth	26	14	2	10	668	548	120	10	4	69	−5
7	Chard	26	10	1	15	462	532	−70	9	5	56	
8	Truro	26	9	1	16	539	632	−93	8	7	53	
9	Paignton	26	10	2	14	462	528	−66	3	4	51	
10	Crediton	26	10	1	15	427	514	÷87	4	5	51	
11	Tiverton	26	10	1	15	462	653	−191	3	5	50	
12	Falmouth	26	9	2	15	488	636	−148	7	2	49	
13	Torquay Athletic	26	10	0	16	446	621	−175	8	4	47	−5
14	Burnham-on-Sea	26	4	1	21	343	773	−430	2	4	24	
If teams are level at any stage, tiebreakers are applied in the following order: 1. Number of matches won 2. Difference between points for and against 3. Total number of points for 4. Aggregate number of points scored in matches between tied teams 5. Number of matches won excluding the first match, then the second and so on until the tie is settled
Green background is the promotion place. Blue background is the play-off place. Pink background are relegation places. Updated: 19 May 2017

=== Promotion play-off ===
Each season, the runners-up in Western Counties West and Western Counties North, participate in a play-off for promotion to South West 1 West. The team with the best playing record, in this case Chew Valley, host the match, and for the second successive season they lost, this time to Devonport Services 12 – 22. It is the first time Devonport Services are promoted to a level six league. This match was the eighteenth play-off for promotion; the northern sides lead with ten victories to the west's eight and the home teams are leading thirteen to five.

	Played	Won	Drawn	Lost	Points for	Points against	Points diff	Try bonus	Loss bonus	Points
Chew Valley	26	18	0	8	798	458	340	15	5	92
Devonport Services (P)	26	17	1	8	719	456	263	14	6	90

April 2018
15:00

Chew Valley	12–22	Devonport Services

Chew Lane, Chew Magna

== 2016–17 ==
=== Participating teams and location ===
The 2016–17 Western Counties West League consists of fourteen teams; seven from Devon, five from Cornwall and two from Somerset. The season began on 3 September 2016 and finished on 22 April 2017. Ten of the fourteen teams participated in last season's competition, the 2015–16 champions, Okehampton were promoted to South West 1 West, along with the play-off winners Kingsbridge. Two Cornish teams, Penryn and Saltash were relegated to the Cornwall/Devon League and were replaced by Bude (champions) and St Ives (runner-up). The three relegated teams from South West One were all allocated places in Western Counties North so the two most westerly teams from that division, Burnham and Wellington were transferred to this league to bring the number of teams to fourteen.

Locations of the 2016–17 Western Counties West teams in Cornwall
Locations of the 2016–17 Western Counties West teams in Devon and Somerset

Team	Ground	Capacity	Town/Village	Previous season
Bude	Bencoolen Meadow	750	Bude, Cornwall	promoted from Cornwall/Devon (1st)
Burnham-on-Sea	BASC Ground		Burnham-on-Sea, Somerset	level transfer from Western Counties North (6th)
Crediton	Blagdon		Crediton, Devon	12th
Cullompton	Stafford Park		Cullompton, Devon	7th
Devonport Services	The Rectory	2,000	Devonport, Plymouth, Devon	9th
Exeter University	Duckes Meadow, Salmon Pool Lane		Exeter, Devon	4th
Sidmouth	Blackmore Field		Sidmouth, Devon	8th
St Austell	Tregorrick Park	4,000 (300 seats)	St Austell, Cornwall	11th
St Ives	Recreation Ground	3,000 (275 seats)	St Ives, Cornwall	promoted from Cornwall/Devon (2nd)
Tiverton	Coronation Field	750	Tiverton, Devon	6th
Torquay Athletic	Recreation Ground	3,000 (300 seats)	Torquay, Devon	5th
Truro	St Clement's Hill	2,000	Truro, Cornwall	3rd
Wadebridge Camels	Molesworth Field	500	Wadebridge, Cornwall	10th
Wellington	Athletic Ground		Wellington, Somerset	level transfer from Western Counties North (10th)

=== League table ===
2016–17 Western Counties West League Table
		Played	Won	Drawn	Lost	Points for	Points against	Points diff	Try bonus	Loss bonus	Points
1	Exeter University (P)	25	21	0	4	960	329	631	18	1	103
2	Cullompton (P)	26	22	0	4	659	311	348	11	2	101
3	Devonport Services	26	17	1	8	587	474	113	8	4	82
4	Truro	24	14	1	9	603	487	116	11	3	72
5	Wadebridge Camels	26	15	0	11	510	548	−38	6	5	71
6	St Ives	26	12	0	14	710	503	207	12	10	70
7	St Austell	26	13	0	13	665	511	154	10	7	69
8	Sidmouth	26	12	0	14	608	593	15	8	5	61
9	Torquay Athletic	26	11	0	15	433	697	−264	5	6	55
10	Crediton	26	9	0	17	439	574	−135	5	7	48
11	Tiverton	26	9	0	17	390	657	−267	4	6	46
12	Burnham-on-Sea	25	8	0	17	429	521	−92	4	9	45
13	Bude	26	8	0	18	413	892	−479	4	3	39
14	Wellington	26	8	0	18	342	651	−309	1	4	32
If teams are level at any stage, tiebreakers are applied in the following order: 1. Number of matches won 2. Difference between points for and against 3. Total number of points for 4. Aggregate number of points scored in matches between tied teams 5. Number of matches won excluding the first match, then the second and so on until the tie is settled
Green background is the promotion place. Blue background is the play-off place. Pink background are relegation places. Updated: 19 May 2017

=== Promotion play-off ===
Each season, the runners-up in Western Counties West and Western Counties North, participate in a play-off for promotion to South West 1 West. The team with the best playing record, in this case Chew Valley, host the match and they lost to Cullompton 12 – 29.

	Played	Won	Drawn	Lost	Points for	Points against	Points diff	Try bonus	Loss bonus	Points
Chew Valley	26	22	0	4	822	493	329	18	0	106
Cullompton (P)	26	22	0	4	659	311	348	11	2	101

29 April 2017
15:00

Chew Valley	12–29	Cullompton

Chew Lane

== 2015–16 ==
The 2015–16 Western Counties West League consists of fourteen teams; nine from Devon and five from Cornwall. The seasons started on 5 September 2015 and the last matches were played on 30 April 2016.

=== Participating teams and location ===
Ten of the fourteen teams participated in last season's competition. The 2014–15 champions Teignmouth were promoted to South West 1 West and Tavistock and St Ives were relegated to the Cornwall/Devon League. The only team from Somerset, Wellington, was transferred to Western Counties North.

Locations of the 2015–16 Western Counties West teams in Cornwall
Locations of the 2015–16 Western Counties West teams in Devon

Team	Ground	Capacity	Town/Village	Previous season
Crediton	Blagdon		Crediton, Devon	promoted from Cornwall/Devon
Cullompton	Stafford Park		Cullompton, Devon	relegated from South West 1 West
Devonport Services	The Rectory	2,000	Devonport, Plymouth, Devon	6th
Exeter University	Duckes Meadow, Salmon Pool Lane		Exeter, Devon	9th
Kingsbridge	High House	1,000 (50 seats)	Kingsbridge, Devon	2nd
Okehampton	Showground	1,120 (120 seats)	Okehampton, Devon	7th
Penryn	Memorial Ground	4,000 (200 seats)	Penryn, Cornwall	11th
Saltash	Moorlands Lane		Saltash, Cornwall	promoted from Cornwall/Devon
Sidmouth	Blackmore Field		Sidmouth, Devon	8th
St Austell	Tregorrick Park	4,000 (300 seats)	St Austell, Cornwall	relegated from South West 1 West
Tiverton	Coronation Field	750	Tiverton, Devon	3rd
Torquay Athletic	Recreation Ground	3,000 (300 seats)	Torquay, Devon	12th
Truro	St Clement's Hill	2,000	Truro, Cornwall	4th
Wadebridge Camels	Molesworth Field	500	Wadebridge, Cornwall	5th

=== League table ===
2015–16 Western Counties West League Table
		Played	Won	Drawn	Lost	Points for	Points against	Points diff	Try bonus	Loss bonus	Points
1	Okehampton (P)	26	23	0	3	605	308	297	15	0	108
2	Kingsbridge (P)	26	22	0	4	745	264	481	16	2	106
3	Truro	26	16	0	10	636	535	101	15	5	85
4	Exeter University	26	17	1	8	738	492	246	13	3	81
5	Torquay Athletic	26	16	0	10	641	611	30	11	3	78
6	Tiverton	26	13	0	13	478	425	53	7	8	67
7	Cullompton	26	11	2	13	528	478	50	5	7	60
8	St Austell	26	10	1	15	455	511	−56	7	9	58
9	Devonport Services	26	10	0	16	478	610	−132	10	5	55
10	Wadebridge Camels	26	9	1	16	505	530	−25	7	8	53
11	Sidmouth	26	10	0	16	494	631	−137	4	5	49
12	Crediton	26	9	3	14	447	658	−211	5	2	49
13	Penryn	26	7	0	19	413	742	−329	5	5	38
14	Saltash	26	5	0	21	426	794	−368	5	7	32
If teams are level at any stage, tiebreakers are applied in the following order: 1. Number of matches won 2. Difference between points for and against 3. Total number of points for 4. Aggregate number of points scored in matches between tied teams 5. Number of matches won excluding the first match, then the second and so on until the tie is settled
Green background is the promotion place. Blue background is the play-off place. Pink background are relegation places. Updated: 9 May 2016

=== Promotion play-off ===
Each season, the runners-up in Western Counties North and Western Counties West, participate in a play-off for promotion to South West 1 West. The team with the best playing record, in this case Kingsbridge, hosted the match against Keynsham and won 16 – 10.

Team	Played	Won	Drawn	Lost	Points for	Points against	Points diff	Try bonus	Loss bonus	Points
Kingsbridge (P)	26	22	0	4	745	264	481	16	2	108
Keynsham	26	20	2	4	681	306	375	14	4	102

8 May 2016
15:00

Kingsbridge	16–10	Keynsham

High House

== 2014–15 ==
=== Participating teams and location ===
The 2014–15 Western Counties West consisted of fourteen teams; nine from Devon, four from Cornwall and one from Somerset. The season started on 6 September 2014 and finished on 18 April 2015. Teignmouth became champions with two matches to play after Exeter University had fifty points deducted for playing ineligible players. Teignmouth were promoted to South West 1 West, while the second place team, Kingsbridge, lost to the runner-up of Western Counties North, Newent in the play-off for promotion. The last two teams, Tavistock and St Ives were relegated to Cornwall/Devon.

Team	Ground	Capacity	Town/Village	Previous season
Devonport Services	The Rectory	2,000	Devonport, Plymouth, Devon	8th
Exeter University	Duckes Meadow, Salmon Pool Lane		Exeter, Devon	promoted from Cornwall/Devon
Kingsbridge	High House	1,000 (50 seats)	Kingsbridge, Devon	3rd
Okehampton	Showground	1,120 (120 seats)	Okehampton, Devon	9th
Penryn	Memorial Ground	4,000 (200 seats)	Penryn, Cornwall	6th
St Ives	Recreation Ground	3,000 (275 seats)	St Ives, Cornwall	12th
Sidmouth	Blackmore Field		Sidmouth, Devon	relegated from South West 1 West
Tavistock	Sandy Park		Tavistock, Devon	11th
Teignmouth	Bitton Sports Ground	1,210 (210 stand)	Teignmouth, Devon	2nd
Tiverton	Coronation Field	750	Tiverton, Devon	promoted from Cornwall/Devon
Torquay Athletic	Recreation Ground	3,000	Torquay, Devon	7th
Truro	St Clement's Hill	2,000	Truro, Cornwall	5th
Wadebridge Camels	Molesworth Field	500	Wadebridge, Cornwall	relegated from South West 1 West
Wellington	Athletic Ground		Wellington, Somerset	10th

=== League table ===
2014–15 Western Counties West League Table
	Team	Played	Won	Drawn	Lost	For	Against	Diff	Try bonus	Loss bonus	Points
1	Teignmouth (P)	26	23	0	3	989	356	633	18	2	112
2	Kingsbridge	26	18	0	8	701	422	279	12	4	88
3	Tiverton	26	17	0	9	574	281	293	11	4	83
4	Truro	26	15	0	11	770	598	172	12	5	78
5	Wadebridge Camels	26	15	0	11	707	503	204	11	4	75
6	Devonport Services	26	15	0	11	556	466	90	8	2	70
7	Okehampton	26	13	0	13	593	504	89	8	6	66
8	Sidmouth	26	11	1	14	526	646	−120	8	5	60
9	Exeter University	26	22	0	4	898	551	347	16	1	56 (Note: Exeter University deducted 50 points after playing ineligible players.)
10	Wellington	26	9	0	17	490	625	−135	6	4	46
11	Penryn	26	9	0	17	531	608	−77	7	7	40
12	Torquay Athletic	26	5	0	21	510	898	−388	8	8	36
13	Tavistock	26	5	0	21	393	927	−534	6	1	27
14	St Ives	26	4	1	21	303	1156	−853	5	1	18
If teams are level at any stage, tiebreakers are applied in the following order: 1. Number of matches won 2. Difference between points for and against 3. Total number of points for 4. Aggregate number of points scored in matches between tied teams 5. Number of matches won excluding the first match, then the second and so on until the tie is settled
Green background is the promotion place. Blue background is the play-off place. Pink background are relegation places. Updated: 8 May 2015

=== Promotion play-off ===
Each season, the runners-up in Western Counties North and Western Counties West, participate in a play-off for promotion to South West 1 West. The team with the best playing record, in this case Newent, hosted the match; their opponents were Kingsbridge who lost the match 26 – 28 to a stoppage time penalty.

Team	Played	Won	Drawn	Lost	Points for	Points against	Points diff	Try bonus	Loss bonus	Points
Newent (P)	26	23	0	3	827	399	428	16	1	110
Kingsbridge	26	18	0	8	701	422	279	12	4	88

25 April 2015
15:00

Newent	28–26	Kingsbridge
	Newent; Kingsbridge

Recreation Ground

== 2013–14 ==
- Bude
- Burnham-on-Sea
- Devonport Services
- Ivybridge
- Kingsbridge
- Okehampton
- Paignton Saxons
- Penryn
- St Ives
- Tavistock
- Teignmouth
- Torquay Athletic
- Truro
- Wellington

== 2009–10 ==
- Bude
- Camborne
- Devonport Services
- Kingsbridge
- Minehead Barbarians
- Newquay Hornets
- North Petherton
- Okehampton
- Penryn
- Tavistock
- Tiverton
- Truro
- Wadebridge Camels
- Withycombe

== 2007–08 ==
2007–08 Western Counties West
Club	Played	Won	Drawn	Lost	Points for	Points against	Points Diff	Bonus Points	Points
Paignton	22	18	0	4	629	252	377	0	36
Sidmouth	22	17	1	4	495	260	235	0	35
Wadebridge Camels	22	12	3	7	618	303	315	0	27
Tiverton	22	12	1	9	381	316	65	0	25
Bude	22	11	2	9	349	354	−5	0	24
Ivybridge	22	9	2	11	340	329	11	0	20
Devonport Services	22	9	2	11	488	501	−84	0	20
Minehead Barbarians	22	9	2	11	429	421	−197	0	20
Kingsbridge	22	9	1	12	408	372	36	0	19
Withycombe	22	9	0	13	242	439	−197	0	18
Hayle	22	6	2	14	235	537	−302	0	14
Penryn	22	3	0	19	177	536	−359	0	6

== Original teams ==
When league rugby began in 1987 this division (known as Western Counties) contained the following teams:

- Avon & Somerset Police
- Cirencester
- Clevedon
- Gordon League
- Matson
- Newquay Hornets
- Okehampton
- Old Redcliffians
- Sidmouth
- Tiverton
- Truro

== Western Counties honours ==
In the first season of the English rugby union league pyramid, sponsored by Courage, there was ten, tier seven leagues. The Western Counties League was for teams based in the south-west of England from Bristol, Cornwall, Devon, Gloucester and Somerset. Each team played one match against each of the other teams with the winning team awarded two points, and there was one point for each team in a drawn match. This system prevailed for five seasons, and in 1992–93 the number of teams increased from eleven to thirteen. The following season Western Counties League was renamed Courage South West 2 League, and three seasons later in 1996–97 a major reorganisation occurred with South West 2 being split into two regional leagues:

1. Courage Western Counties North consisted of sixteen teams based in Bristol, Gloucestershire and Somerset, and each team continued to play the others once
2. Courage Western Counties West consisted of eleven teams based in Cornwall, Devon and Somerset, and each team played the other twice.

=== Western Counties (1987–1993) ===
Originally Western Counties North and Western Counties West was a single division called Western Counties (sponsored by Courage), involving teams based in the south-west of England including Bristol, Cornwall, Devon, Gloucester and Somerset. Each team played one match against each of the other teams with the winning team awarded two points, and there was one point for each team in a drawn match. It was a tier 7 league with promotion up to South West 2 (Note: South West 2 is currently two regional divisions – South West 1 East and South West 1 West.) and relegation to either Cornwall/Devon or Gloucestershire/Somerset. (Note: Gloucestershire/Somerset is currently two separate leagues – Gloucester Premier and Somerset Premier.)

Western Counties
Season	No of teams	No of matches	Champions	Runners-up	Relegated team(s)	Ref
1987–88	11	10	Matson	Gordon League	Avon & Somerset Police, Sidmouth	
1988–89	11	10	Gordon League	Avonmouth Old Boys	Devonport Services, Crediton	
1989–90	11	10	Penryn	Avonmouth Old Boys	Cirencester, Devon & Cornwall Police	
1990–91	11	10	Coombe Down	Avonmouth Old Boys	Truro	
1991–92	11	10	Clevedon	Bridgwater & Albion (Note: Old Culverhaysians also promoted.)	Newquay Hornets	
1992–93	13	12	Gloucester Old Boys	Launceston	Plymouth Civil Service, Devon & Cornwall Police	

=== Western Counties (1993–1996) ===
At the end of the 1992–93 season the top six teams from London Division 1 and the top six from South West Division 1 were combined to create National 5 South. This meant that Western Counties dropped from a tier 7 league to a tier 8 league for the years that National 5 South was active. Promotion continued to South West 2 and relegation down to either Cornwall/Devon or Gloucestershire/Somerset. (Note: Gloucestershire/Somerset is currently two separate leagues – Gloucester Premier and Somerset Premier.) The league continued to be sponsored by Courage.

Western Counties
Season	No of teams	No of matches	Champions	Runners-up	Relegated team(s)	Ref
1993–94	13	12	Old Patesians	Tiverton	Wiveliscombe	
1994–95	13	12	Launceston	Devonport Services	Avonmouth Old Boys	
1995–96	13	12	Dings Crusaders	Spartans (Note: League restructuring meant that five teams were promoted, including 3rd to 5th place Penzance & Newlyn, Devonport Services and Tiverton.)	No relegation (Note: There was no relegation as Western Counties was due to split into Western Counties North and Western Counties West.)	
Green background are the promotion places.

=== Western Counties West (1996–2009) ===
Major restructuring by the RFU at the end of the 1995–96 season saw Western Counties split into two separate leagues, Western Counties North and Western Counties West, which reverted to tier 7 leagues due to the cancellation of National 5 South. Promotion from Western Counties West was now to the new South West 2 West division (formerly South West 2) (Note: From the 1996–97 season South West 2 was split into two regional divisions – South West 2 East and South West 2 West.) while relegation was now to Cornwall/Devon. (Note: Relegated Western Counties North clubs dropped to Gloucestershire/Somerset (currently Gloucester Premier / Somerset Premier.) From the 2008–09 season the league sponsor is Tribute.

Western Counties West
Season	No of teams	No of matches	Champions	Runners-up	Relegated team(s)	Ref
1996–97	11	20	Okehampton	St Austell	Old Plymouthians, Crediton, Saltash	
1997–98	10	18	St Austell	Kingsbridge	Sidmouth, Bideford	
1998–99	10	18	Truro	Ivybridge	Devonport Services, Kingsbridge	
1999–00	10	18	Ivybridge	Withycombe	No relegation (Note: There was no relegation this season due to restructuring of the league system by the RFU.)	
2000–01	12	22	Crediton	Withycombe	St Ives, Wellington, Paignton, Devonport Services (Note: At the end of the 2000–01 season there were more relegations from Western Counties West than usual due to with four teams going down, including 9th placed Paignton and 8th placed Devonport Services. Due to the Foot-and-mouth disease teams were unable to fulfil all fixtures which meant that 10th placed South Molton escaped relegation on aggregate points from games played.)	
2001–02	12	22	Exmouth	Penryn	South Molton, St Austell	
2002–03	12	22	Penryn	Withycombe	Okehampton, Bideford	
2003–04	12	22	Camborne	Torquay Athletic	Tiverton, St Just	
2004–05	12	22	Mounts Bay	St Ives	Wessex, Devonport Services	
2005–06	12	22	Torquay Athletic	Newton Abbot	Paignton, Ivel Barbarians	
2006–07	12	22	Barnstaple	Hayle	Crediton, Truro	
2007–08	12	22	Paignton	Sidmouth	Hayle, Penryn	
2008–09	14	26	Cullompton	Ivybridge	No relegation (Note: There was no relegation this season due to restructuring of the league system by the RFU.) (14th Withycombe)	

=== Western Counties West (2009–2022) ===
Despite widespread league restructuring by the RFU, Western Counties West continued as a tier 7 league, with promotion to South West 1 West (formerly South West 2 West) and relegation to Cornwall/Devon. Tribute continued to sponsor the league.

Western Counties West
Season	No of teams	No of matches	Champions	Runners-up	Relegated team(s)	Ref
2009–10	14	26	Camborne	Wadebridge Camels	Minehead Barbarians, Withycombe	
2010–11	14	26	Penryn	Kingsbridge	Tavistock, Newquay Hornets	
2011–12	14	26	North Petherton	Torquay Athletic	Tiverton, St Ives	
2012–13	14	26	St Austell	Bideford	Exeter Saracens, Honiton	
2013–14	14	26	Ivybridge	Teignmouth	Bude, Paignton	
2014–15	14	26	Teignmouth	Kingsbridge	St Ives, Tavistock	
2015–16	14	26	Okehampton	Kingsbridge	Saltash, Penryn	
2016–17	14	26	Exeter University	Cullompton	Wellington, Bude	
2017–18	14	26	St Ives	Devonport Services	Burnham-on-Sea, Torquay Athletic	
2018–19	14	26	Sidmouth	Crediton	Paignton, Truro	
2019–20	14	26	Wellington	St Austell	Cullompton, Saltash	
2020–21	14	26	Cancelled due to COVID-19 pandemic in the United Kingdom.			
2021–22	14	26	Wadebridge Camels	Truro	Honiton	

=== Counties 1 Western West (2022– ) ===
Following league reorganisation, Western Counties West is renamed Counties 1 Western West and continues to be a tier 7 league. Promotion is to Regional 2 South West and relegation to Counties 2 Cornwall, Counties 2 Devon or Counties 2 Somerset.

Counties 1 Western West
Season	No of teams	No of matches	Champions	Runner-up	Relegated team(s)	Ref
2022–23	12	22	Topsham	Cullompton	Falmouth (12th – no relegation)	
2023–24	12	22	Tiverton	Paignton	Falmouth (12th)	
2024–25	12	22	Pirate Amateurs	Paignton	Tavistock (11th) and Bideford (12th)	
2025–26	12	22	Wiveliscombe	Paignton	Penryn (11th) and Plymstock Albion Oaks (12th)	

== Number of league titles ==
- Penryn (3) (Note: One of Penryn's title wins was back when the league was known as Western Counties.)
- Camborne (2)
- Ivybridge (2)
- Okehampton (2)
- St Austell (2)
- Barnstaple (1)
- Clevedon (1) (Note: Clevedon's title win was when the league was known as Western Counties.)
- Coombe Down (1) (Note: Coombe Down title win was when the league was known as Western Counties.)
- Crediton (1)
- Cullompton (1)
- Dings Crusaders (1) (Note: Dings Crusaders title win was when the league was known as Western Counties.)
- Exeter University (1)
- Exmouth (1)
- Gloucester Old Boys (1) (Note: Gloucester Old Boys title win was when the league was known as Western Counties.)
- Gordon League (1) (Note: Gordon League's title win was when the league was known as Western Counties.)
- Launceston (1) (Note: Launceston's title win was when the league was known as Western Counties.)
- Matson (1) (Note: Matson's title win was back when the league was known as Western Counties.)
- Mounts Bay (1)
- North Petherton (1)
- Old Patesians (1) (Note: Old Patesians title win was back when the league was known as Western Counties.)
- Paignton (1)
- Pirates Amateurs (1)
- Sidmouth (1)
- St Ives (1)
- Teignmouth (1)
- Tiverton (1)
- Topsham (1)
- Torquay Athletic (1)
- Truro (1)
- Wadebridge Camels (1)
- Wellington (1)
- Wiveliscombe (1)

== Promotion play-offs ==
Since the 2000–01 season there has been a play-off between the runners-up of Western Counties North and Western Counties West for the third and final promotion place to South West 1 West. The team with the superior league record has home advantage in the tie. As of the end of the 2019–20 season the northern sides have been the more successful with ten victories to the west's nine while the home team has won thirteen times compared to the away teams six.

Western Counties (west v north) promotion play-off results
Season	Home team	Score	Away team	Venue	Attendance
2000–01	Taunton Titans (N)	24–16	Withycombe (W)	Hyde Park, Taunton, Somerset	
2001–02	St Mary's Old Boys (N)	43–7	Penryn (W)	Trench Lane, Almondsbury, Bristol	
2002–03	Thornbury (N)	12–5	Withycombe (W)	Cooper's Farm, Thornbury, Gloucestershire	
2003–04	Spartans (N)	18–7	Torquay Athletic (W)	Lansdown Road, Gloucester, Gloucestershire	
2004–05	St Ives (W)	27–5	Thornbury (N)	Alexandra Road, St Ives, Cornwall	
2005–06	Newton Abbot (W)	24–12	Walcot (N)	Rackerhayes, Newton Abbot, Devon	
2006–07	Hayle (W)	11–27	Barts Rugby (N)	Memorial Park, Hayle, Cornwall	
2007–08	Sidmouth (W)	23–20	Old Redcliffians (N)	Blackmore Field, Sidmouth, Devon	1,000
2008–09	Chosen Hill Former Pupils (N)	33–25	Ivybridge (W)	Brookfield Road, Churchdown, Gloucester	
2009–10	Wadebridge Camels (W)	25–21	Thornbury (N)	Molesworth Field, Wadebridge, Cornwall	
2010–11	Thornbury (N)	54–7	Kingsbridge (W)	Cooper's Farm, Thornbury, Gloucestershire	
2011–12	Old Centralians (N)	39–7	Torquay Athletic (W)	Saintbridge Sports Centre, Gloucester, Gloucestershire	
2012–13	Wells (N)	20–27	Bideford (W)	Charter Way, Wells, Somerset	400
2013–14	Teignmouth (W)	10–35	Matson (N)	Bitton Park Sports Ground, Teignmouth, Devon	
2014–15	Newent (N)	28–26	Kingsbridge (W)	Recreation Ground, Newent, Gloucestershire	
2015–16	Kingsbridge (W)	16–10	Keynsham (N)	High House, Kingsbridge, Devon	
2016–17	Chew Valley (N)	12–29	Cullompton (W)	Chew Lane, Chew Magna, Somerset	700
2017–18	Chew Valley (N)	12–22	Devonport Services (W)	Chew Lane, Chew Magna, Somerset	
2018–19	Midsomer Norton (N)	15–19	Crediton (W)	Norton Down Playing Fields, Midsomer Norton, Somerset	
2019–20	Cancelled due to COVID-19 pandemic in the United Kingdom. Best ranked runner up – St Austell (W) – promoted instead.				
2020–21	Cancelled due to COVID-19 pandemic in the United Kingdom.				
2021–22	Cancelled due to league reorganisation				
Green background represent the promoted team, (N) stands for Western Counties North teams, (W) stands for Western Counties West teams

== Summary of tier seven format since 1987 ==
Format of tier seven Western Counties West
Year	Name	No of teams	No of matches
1987–92	Western Counties League	11	10
1992–96	Western Counties League	13	12
1996–97	Western Counties West	11	20
1997–00	Western Counties West	10	18
2000–08	Western Counties West	12	22
2008–22	Western Counties West	14	26
2022–	Counties 1 Western West	12	22

== Sponsorship ==
The Western Counties League was part of the Courage Clubs Championship and was sponsored by Courage Brewery from the first season, 1987–88 to season 1996–97. The league was unsponsored until season 2007–08 when St Austell Brewery sponsored South-west based leagues under the Tribute Ale label.

== See also ==
- South West Division RFU
- Cornwall RFU
- Devon RFU
- Somerset RFU
- English rugby union system
