= Truro RFC =

Rugby union club, based in Cornwall

(England) Truro RFC
- Full name: Truro Rugby Football Club
- Union: Cornwall RFU
- Founded: 1885; 141 years ago
- Location: Truro, Cornwall, England
- Ground: St Clements Hill (Capacity: 2,000)
- League: Regional 2 South West
- 2024–25: 11th (relegated to Counties 1 Western West)
Team kit

Official website
- trurorfc.rfu.club

Truro RFC is a Cornish rugby union club based in the city of Truro and was formed in 1885. The club's colours are blue and gold and they operate two senior men's teams, a women's team, a colts side and various mini/junior teams (ages 7–16). The men's first team currently play in Counties 1 Western West – a league at level 7 in the English rugby union system.

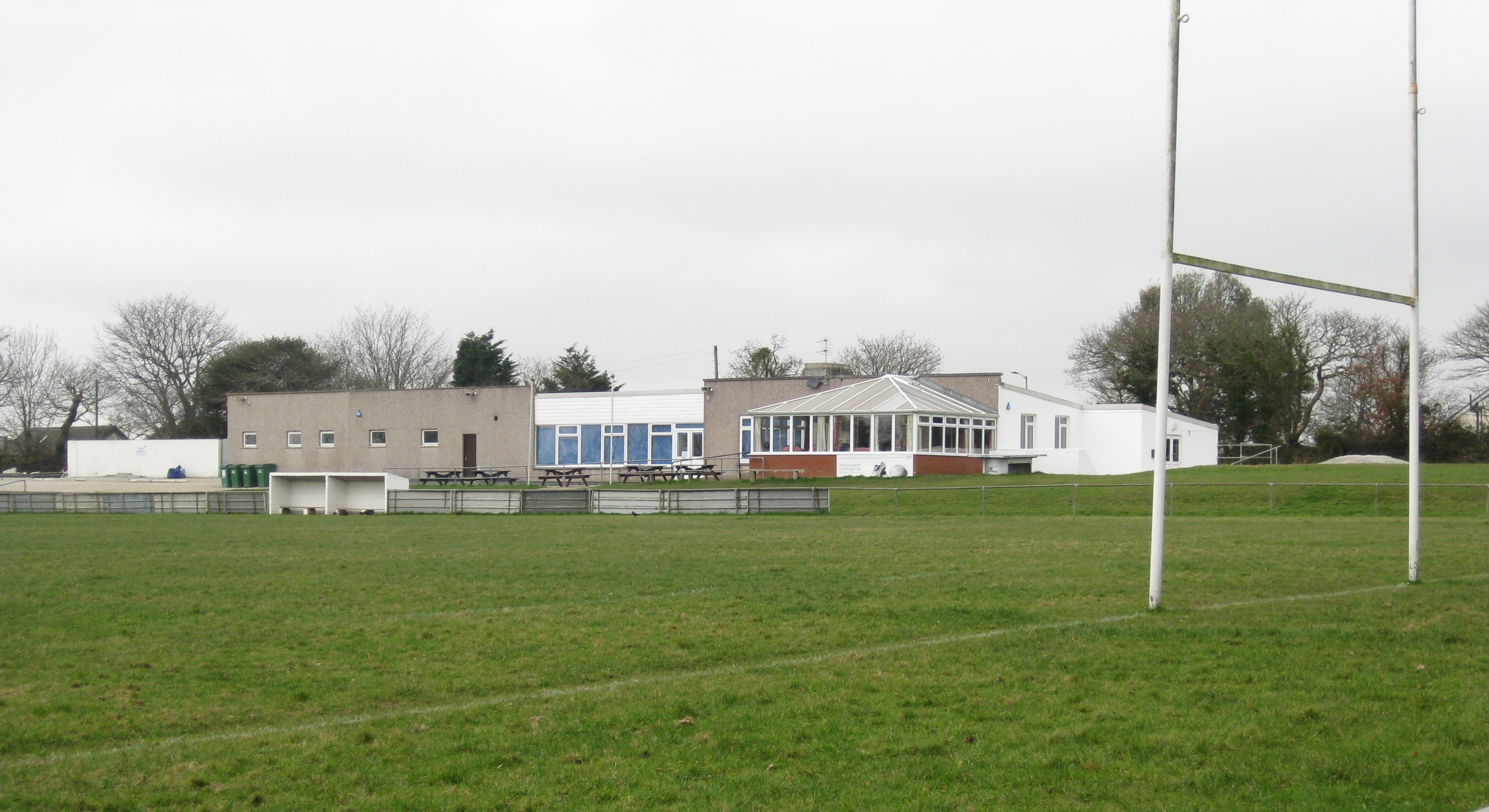
View of club house at St Clements Hill, home of Truro RFC

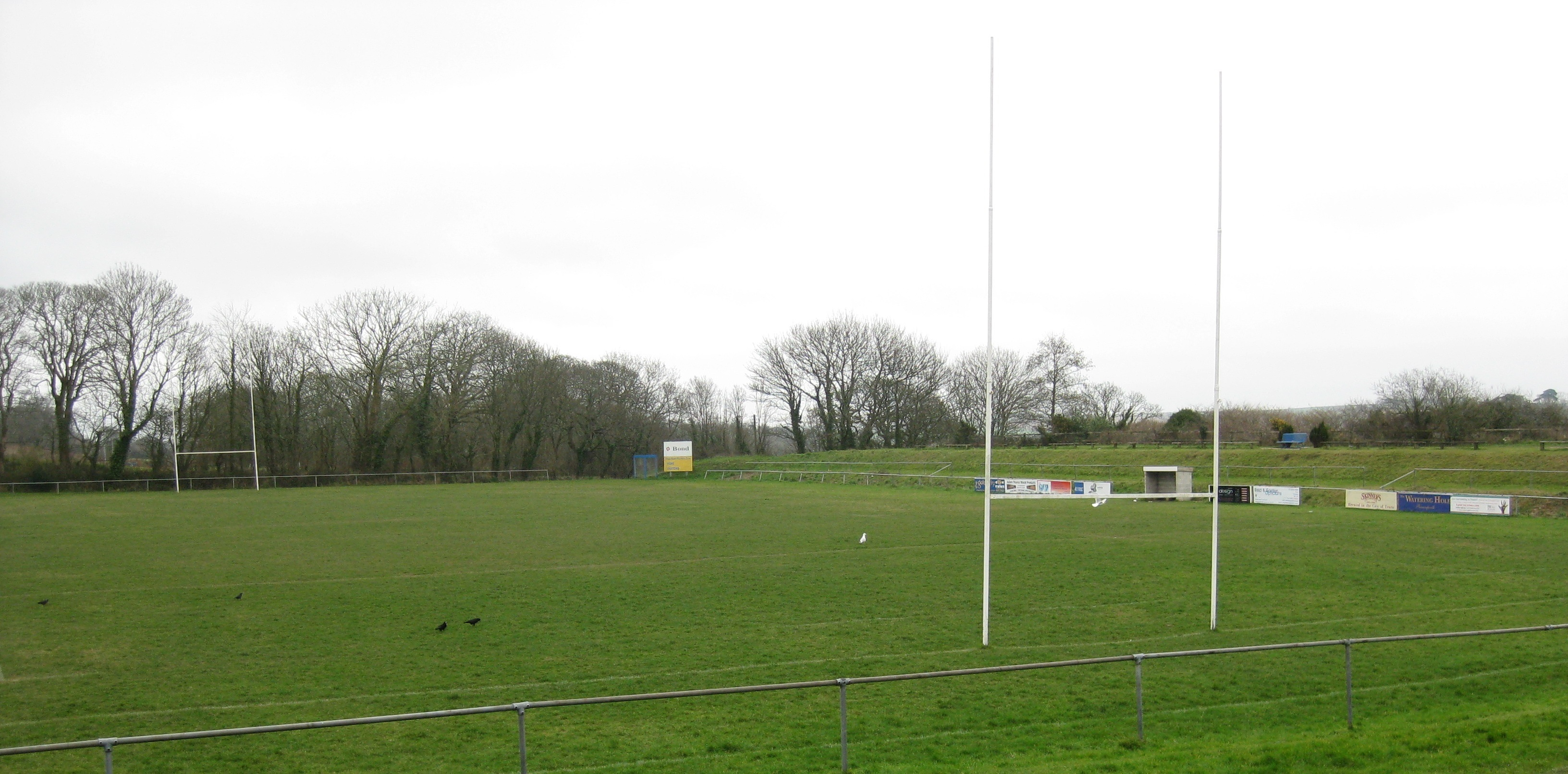
Alternative view of St Clements Hill showing the south-east bank

== History ==
Truro RFC are one of the oldest rugby union clubs in Cornwall having been founded in 1885. Despite being one of the senior clubs in the county the club has only started to experience success in recent times. With the advent of the Courage National Leagues in 1987, Truro were placed in Western Counties - ranked at tier 7 of the English rugby union league system. They remained in this division until 1991 when they were relegated to Courage Cornwall/Devon having finished bottom of the league standings. After seven relatively unremarkable seasons in Cornwall/Devon, Truro finally won the first league title in the club's history, finishing 4 points clear of second placed Crediton who were also promoted. This league title was the beginning of the club's most successful period so far as they went on to achieve three successive promotions, winning Western Counties West in 1999 and then South West 2 West (winning 21 out of 22 games) to reach South West Division 1, which at tier 5 is the highest level Truro have played.

In 2001 after just one year in South West Division 1 Truro were relegated to South West 2 West. They bounced back the following year by winning a league and cup double. First they won the Cornwall Cup 27–20 against Penryn at the Recreation Ground - remarkably the first time the club had reached the final of the competition let alone won it. They then overcame promotion rivals, Berry Hill, to claim the league title after a very close contest which saw the two sides finishing on 37 points apiece but Truro going up as champions due to better for/against record. In 2004 the club were relegated once more from South West Division 1 in bottom place, after two seasons in the division. They would also reach the final of the Cornwall Cup that year, losing 0–22 to Redruth at the Recreation Ground in Camborne. The demotion at the end of the 2003–04 season would be the first of three relegation's in four years as Truro went down from South West 2 West in 2006 and then from Western Counties West in 2007.

In 2017 the club won the South West section of the RFU Intermediate Cup, advancing through to the national semi-finals where they met the London & South East champions, Charlton Park. Unfortunately, Truro were unable to qualify for the final at Twickenham Stadium as they lost heavily away to the London side. In 2019 Truro were relegated from Western Counties West on the last weekend of the 2018–19 season, finishing 13th out of 14. After just one season, Truro returned to Western Counties West, where despite the COVID-19 crisis they had done enough to be crowned league champions of Cornwall/Devon.

== Ground ==
St Clements Hill is in south-east Truro at the top of the road that gives it its name, about 35–40 minutes' walk from the train station (be warned it is hilly). St Clements Hill consists of a club-house, main pitch and a secondary pitch for 2nd XV and junior fixtures, and there is plenty of parking available in and around the ground. The main pitch does not have a stand or any covered areas, although there is a tiered bank that surrounds the pitch on two sides offering a good view of the action for spectators. Due to the bank overall capacity at the ground is around 2,000, all of which is standing.

== Season summary ==
| Season | League | | | National Cup(s) | | County Cup(s) | |
| Season | Competition/Level | Position | Points | Competition | Performance | Competition | Performance |
|---|---|---|---|---|---|---|---|
| 1987–88 | Western Counties (7) | | | | | | |
| 1988–89 | Western Counties (7) | | | | | | |
| 1989–90 | Western Counties (7) | | | | | | |
| 1990–91 | Western Counties (7) | (relegated) | | | | | |
| 1991–92 | Cornwall/Devon (8) | | | | | | |
| 1992–93 | Cornwall/Devon (8) | | | | | | |
| 1993–94 | Cornwall/Devon (8) | | | | | | |
| 1994–95 | Cornwall/Devon (8) | | | | | | |
| 1995–96 | Cornwall/Devon (8) | | | | | | |
| 1996–97 | Cornwall/Devon (8) | | | | | | |
| 1997–98 | Cornwall/Devon (8) | 1st (promoted) | 30 | | | | |
| 1998–99 | Western Counties West (7) | 1st (promoted) | 26 | | | | |
| 1999–00 | South West 2 West (6) | 1st (promoted) | 42 | | | | |
| 2000–01 | South West 1 (5) | 10th (relegated) | 17 | Tetley's Bitter Cup | 1st Round | Cornwall Cup | Semi-finals |
| 2001–02 | South West 2 West (6) | 1st (promoted) | 37 | | | Cornwall Cup | Winners |
| 2002–03 | South West 1 (5) | 7th | 19 | Powergen Cup | Qualifying Round | Cornwall Cup | 1st Round |
| 2003–04 | South West 1 (5) | 12th (relegated) | 8 | Powergen Intermediate Cup | 1st Round | Cornwall Cup | Runners up |
| 2004–05 | South West 2 West (6) | 5th | 26 | Powergen Cup | Preliminary Round | Cornwall Cup | 3rd Round |
| 2005–06 | South West 2 West (6) | 10th (relegated) | 14 | Powergen Intermediate Cup | 5th Round | Cornwall Cup | 3rd Round |
| 2006–07 | Western Counties West (7) | 12th (relegated) | 0 | EDF Energy Senior Vase | 2nd Round | | |
| 2007–08 | Cornwall/Devon (8) | 4th | 30 | | | Cornwall Cup | Semi-finals |
| 2008–09 | Cornwall/Devon (8) | 3rd (promoted) | 32 | EDF Energy Senior Vase | 4th Round | | |
| 2009–10 | Western Counties West (7) | 4th | 36 | | | Cornwall Cup | Semi-finals |
| 2010–11 | Western Counties West (7) | 10th | 51 (Note: The 2010–11 season would see the introduction of bonus points into lower league English rugby union (tier 6 and below).) | | | | |
| 2011–12 | Western Counties West (7) | 6th | 79 | | | Cornwall Cup | 2nd Round |
| 2012–13 | Western Counties West (7) | 10th | 52 | | | Cornwall Cup | Quarter-finals |
| 2013–14 | Western Counties West (7) | 5th | 90 | | | Cornwall Cup | Quarter-finals |
| 2014–15 | Western Counties West (7) | 4th | 78 | | | Cornwall Cup | Semi-finals |
| 2015–16 | Western Counties West (7) | 3rd | 85 | | | Cornwall Cup | 1st Round |
| 2016–17 | Western Counties West (7) | 4th | 72 | RFU Intermediate Cup | Semi-finals | Cornwall Cup | Semi-finals |
| 2017–18 | Western Counties West (7) | 8th | 53 | | | Cornwall Cup | 1st Round |
| 2018–19 | Western Counties West (7) | 13th (relegated) | 42 | | | Cornwall Cup | Quarter-finals |
| 2019–20 | Cornwall/Devon (8) | 1st (promoted) | 102.67 (Note: The season was postponed and ultimately cancelled due to the COVID-19 pandemic in the United Kingdom with Truro sitting in 1st, having played 20 games and gained 85 points. The remaining games were calculated on a 'best playing record formula', with Truro remaining in 1st place with 102.67 points and gaining promotion as league champions.) | | | Cornwall Cup | Cancelled due to the COVID pandemic |
| 2020–21 | Western Counties West (7) | Postponed due to the COVID pandemic | | | | Cornwall Cup | Cancelled due to the COVID pandemic |
| 2021–22 | Western Counties West (7) | 2nd (promoted) | 92 | | | Cornwall Cup | Quarter-finals |
| 2022–23 | Regional 2 South West (6) | 3rd | 75 | | | Cornwall Cup | |
Green background stands for either league champions (with promotion) or cup winners. Blue background stands for promotion without winning league or losing cup finalists. Pink background stands for relegation.

== Honours ==
- Cornwall/Devon champions (2): 1997–98, 2019–20
- Western Counties West champions: 1998-99
- Western Counties West promotion: 2021–22
- South West 2 West champions (2): 1999–00, 2001–02
- Cornwall Cup winners: 2002
- RFU South West Intermediate winners: 2017

== Notable former players ==
- (England) Darren Dawidiuk - Truro born hooker who started his career at the club after coming through the youth teams. Currently playing in the Premiership with Gloucester after a spell with the Cornish Pirates.
- (England) Lewis Vinnicombe - winger who had short spell with Truro in between playing for Redruth and the Cornish Pirates. He has been capped by Cornwall and was the top try scorer at the 2014 Bill Beaumont Cup.
- Tom Voyce - Truro born full-back and winger who played youth rugby at the club before going on to a successful career in the English Premiership with several clubs including London Wasps, and was also capped 9 times by England.

== See also ==
- Cornish rugby
