= Darren Dawidiuk =

English rugby union player

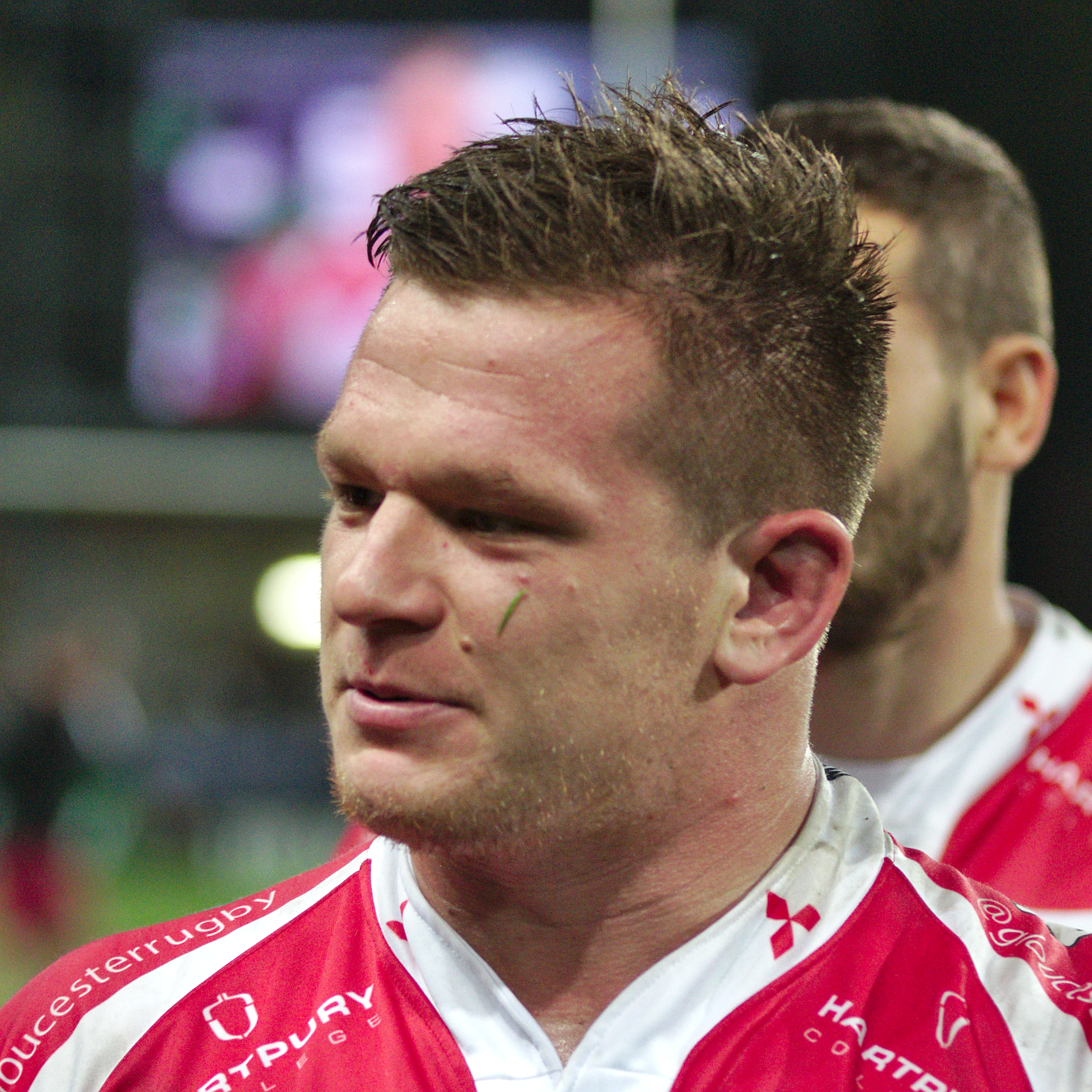
- Dawidiuk on October 25, 2014
- Born: Darren Dawidiuk; 21 September 1987 (age 39) Truro, England
- Height: 1.80 m (5 ft 11 in)
- Weight: 108 kg (17 st 0 lb)
- School: Richard Lander School; Truro College

Rugby union career
- Position: Hooker
- Current team: Bristol Bears
Youth career
- -: Truro
- –: Truro College
- –: Cornish Pirates Academy
Senior career
Years	Team	Apps	(Points)
2006–2009	Cornish Pirates	45	(20)
2009–2017	Gloucester	138	(35)
2017–2018	London Irish	0	(0)
2018–2020	Coventry	0	(0)
2019	Northampton Saints	0	(0)
2020–	Bristol Bears		
- Correct as of 27 November 2020
International career
Years	Team	Apps	(Points)
–	South West of England		
–	Rugby Academy (SWERA)		
2005–2006	England Colleges		

Darren Dawidiuk (born 21 September 1987 in Truro) is a former rugby union footballer, who last played for Premiership Rugby outfit Bristol Bears. He played as a hooker.

== Career ==
Dawidiuk joined the Cornish Pirates as an academy player in 2006 having played his youth rugby at Truro RFC, joining the city club at the age of 12, and making progress through the juniors and colts before he made a 1st team debut as a blind-side flanker in a league match against St. Ives.

Dawidiuk became a member of the South West of England Rugby Academy (SWERA) based at Truro, and he also gained selection to the England Colleges team in 2005.

He played for England Colleges again in 2006, and also captained the Truro College team that beat South Gloucestershire and Stroud College in the final of the British Colleges Cup competition, played at Castlecroft.

He made four appearances for the Cornish Pirates in his first season, and followed this with 14 in 2007–08 and 27 total appearances in 2008–2009. He also had a loan period at Redruth RFC during which time he appeared in the first team.

Dawidiuk was signed to Gloucester Rugby in the Aviva Premiership, starting from September 2009. After 8 seasons with Gloucester, on 25 July 2017, Dawidiuk left Kingsholm as he signed for rivals London Irish, returned to the Aviva Premiership from the 2017–18 season.

On 10 May 2018, it was announced Dawidiuk had been signed by Coventry, in preparation for their return to the Championship, following promotion from National League 1.

It was announced on 27 February 2019, that Dawidiuk had agreed to join Northampton Saints on loan until the conclusion of the 2018/19 season.

In November 2020, it was announced that he was currently on a short-term trial at Premiership Rugby side Bristol Bears.
