= Tiverton RFC =

English rugby union club, based in Devon

Tiverton
- Full name: Tiverton Rugby Club
- Union: Devon RFU
- Nickname: Tivvy
- Founded: 1868; 158 years ago
- Location: Tiverton, Devon, South West England
- Ground: Coronation Field (Capacity: 750)
- Chairman: Charles Burt
- President: Des Glanville
- Coach: Jon Hill
- Captain: Jack Sampson
- League: Regional 2 South West
- 2025–26: 2nd
Team kit

Official website
- www.tivertonrugbyclub.rfu.club

Tiverton Rugby Club is a rugby union club based in the town of Tiverton, Devon, England. The club plays at Coronation Field, and as of the 2025–26 season competes in the level six Regional 2 South West league and the Devon Intermediate Cup. It is considered to be the oldest rugby club in Devon.

== History ==
Tiverton Rugby Club was the opposing team in the first recorded rugger match played by the boys of Blundell's School in 1868. According to the club's website, the game was played under the school's own rules: with twenty players in each team, no flags, a referee and two umpires and it was known as the "carrying game".

The team adopted the standard rugby rules in 1870, following which it played not only against the school but against teams from nearby towns such as Crediton, Exeter and Wellington. During the 1880s the club was considered to be one of the top clubs in the South West, and won the inaugural Devon Rugby Football Union annual competition in 1888.

Since then, the club's website reports, the sport has at one time almost been forgotten in the town while at other times there have been as many as four town clubs competing against each other. In the 1980s the club was three times champions of the pre-league Devon Merit Table and four times winners of the Devon Colts Cup. In 1998 the club won the Devon Cup again after 110 years, following victory over Torquay Athletic on their own ground.

== Honours ==
Devon Senior Cup
Winners (3): 1887, 1888, 1998
Devon Senior Vase
Winners: 2010
Devon Colts Cup
Winners (3): 1971, 1972, 1981
Havill Plate
Winners: 1980
Counties 1 Western West
Winners: 2023–24
Tribute Cornwall/Devon League
Champions: 2005–06
Runner-up: 2013–14
Devon Merit Table 1
Champions (4): 1993–94, 1998–99, 1999–00, 2004–05
Devon Merit Table 2
Champions: 2010–11

== Notable former players ==
- Arthur Fagan (England)
- Charles Burt (England Schools)
- Craig Gillies (England A, Worcester Warriors, Llanelli Scarlets, Richmond, Bath)
- Matt Kvesic (England, England U20, England U18, England U16, Gloucester, Stourbridge, Worcester Warriors)
- Willie Luangrath (Laos)

== See also ==
- Oldest football clubs
- History of rugby union
- English rugby union system
