= Recreation Ground, Torquay =

Former cricket ground located in Torquay, Devon, England

Coordinates: 50°27′44″N 3°32′31″W

Recreation Ground
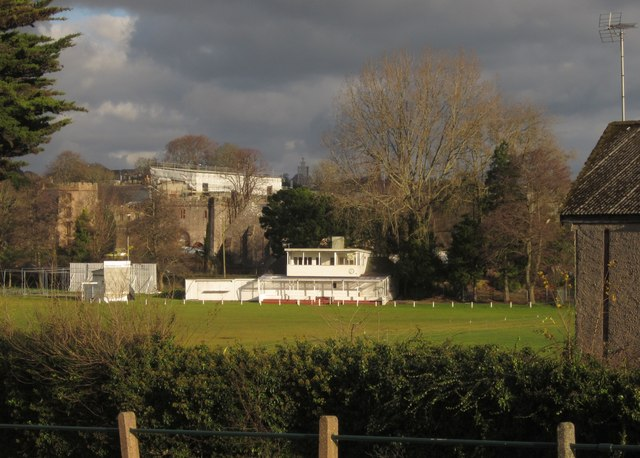

Ground information
- Location: Torquay, Devon
- Country: England
- Establishment: 1888
- Capacity: 3,000

Team information
Torquay Cricket Club	(1926–present)
Torquay Athletic RFC	(1888-90, 1891-92, 1904–present)
Torquay Wanderers	(1890-1892)
Torbay AFC	(1890-1891)
Torquay Town	(1892-1894)
Torquay Juniors	(1894-1897)
Torquay Albion	(1897-1900)
Torquay United	(1900-1904)
Devon	(1932–present)
Somerset	(1969–1975)
- As of 21 August 2010; Source: CricketArchive

Recreation Ground is a former First-class cricket ground located in Torquay, Devon.

== History ==
It has been the home of Torquay Cricket Club since 1926. Some sources wrongly attribute matches played at Torquay Cricket Club prior to 1926 to the Recreation Ground, although they were played at Barton Road which was the home of Torquay CC from 1852 to 1925 and is now the home of Barton CC. Between 1954 and 1958, the ground hosted annual fixtures between the South and the North, and between England XI and Commonwealth XI. The ground has been among the home venues for Devon County Cricket Club since 1932, while first-class county Somerset have also hosted four matches on the ground. The ground was first used by Torquay Athletic in 1888, but Athletic left twice due to financial disputes before returning for good in 1904. Since 1926 Torquay Athletic RFC have continued as tenants at the ground with cricket being played in the summer months.

The capacity is around 3,000 including 300 in the grandstand. Initially the grandstand held around 600 but in recent years only half of it is accessible due to safety concerns.

Filming location for the Monty Python sketch 'Derby Council v. All Blacks Rugby Match'.

== Gallery ==
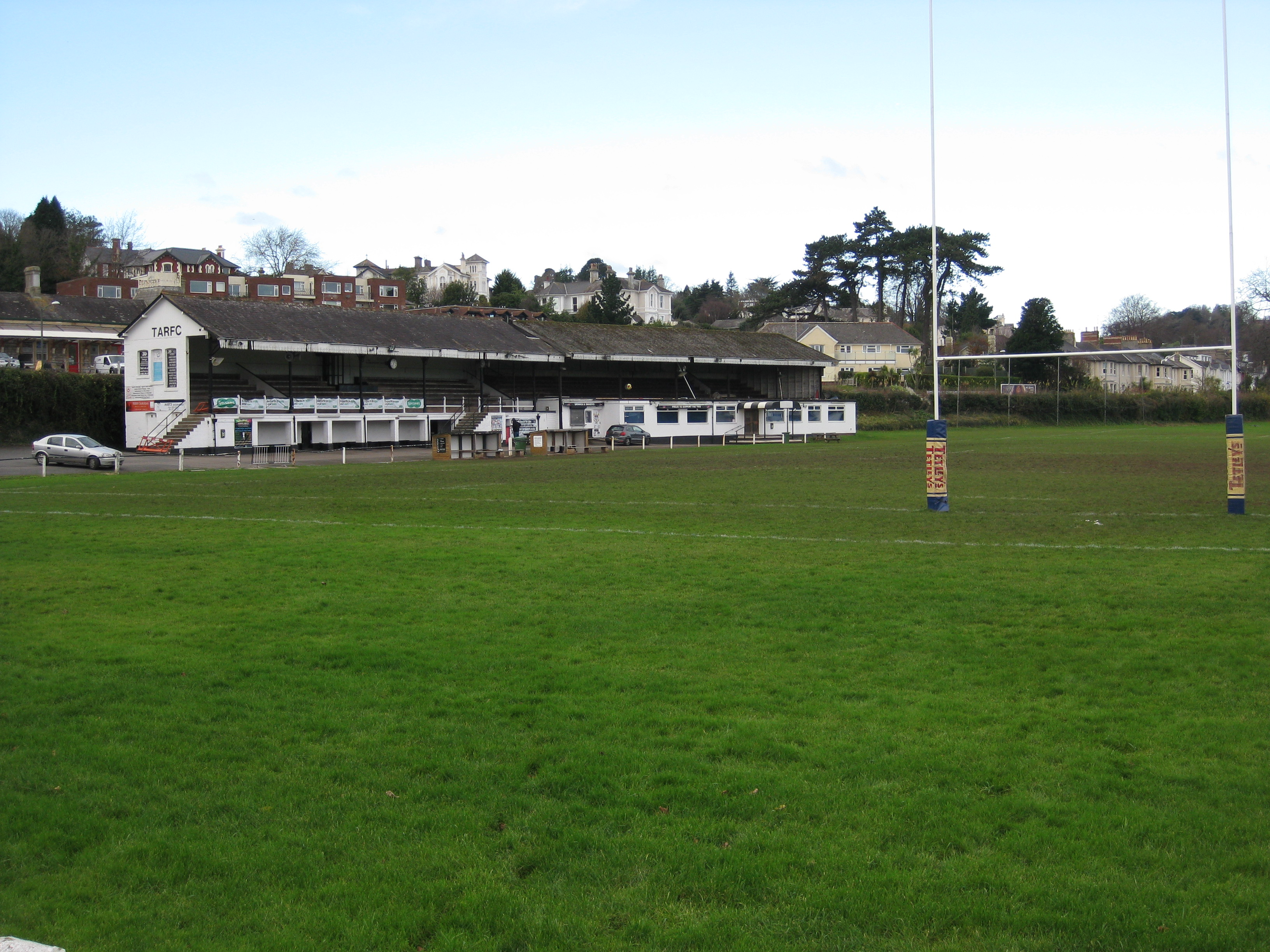
View of the grandstand at the Recreation Ground, home of Torquay Cricket Club

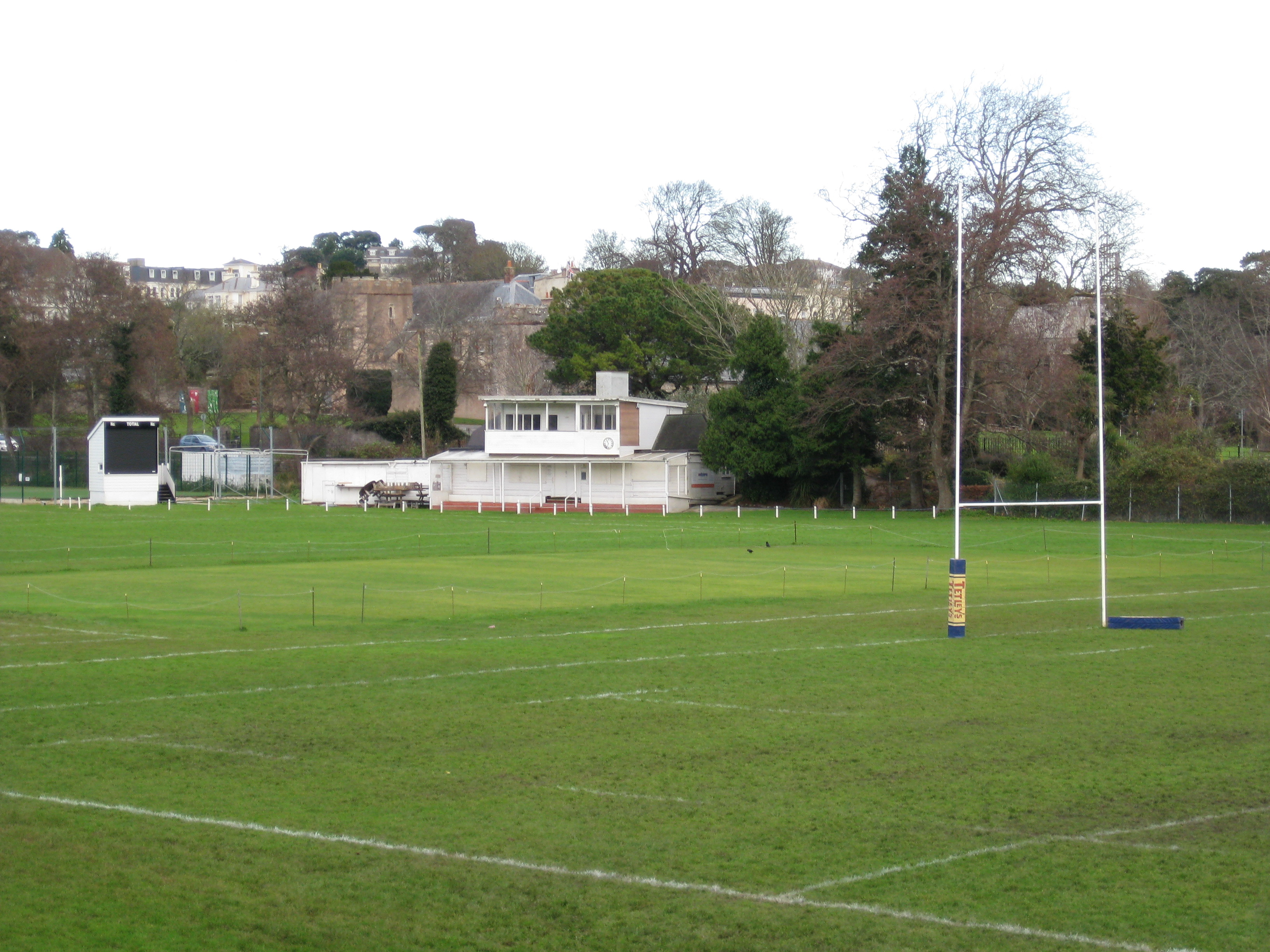
View from grandstand showing cricket pavilion
