= 2011–12 Tribute Cornwall League 2 =

English rugby union league season

Tribute Cornwall 2
- Countries: England
- Champions: St Agnes
- Runners-up: Perranporth
- Promoted: St Agnes and Perranporth
- Relegated: no relegation
- Matches played: 63

The 2011–12 Tribute Cornwall League 2, was a full season of rugby union within Cornwall League 2. Due to restructuring, this was the first time the level ten league, which is within the English rugby union league system, ran since the 2008–09 season.

== Team changes ==
Camelford RFC were accepted into the league system for the first time, the other six teams were previously in Tribute Cornwall League One.

== Table ==
2011–12 Tribute Cornwall League 2 Final Table
| Pos | Team | P | W | D | L | F | A | Diff | Bonus pts | Pts | Notes |
|---|---|---|---|---|---|---|---|---|---|---|---|
| 1 | St Agnes | 18 | 16 | 0 | 2 | 834 | 179 | 665 | 13 | 77 |
| 2 | Perranporth | 18 | 13 | 0 | 5 | 624 | 219 | 405 | 13 | 66 |
| 3 | St Day | 18 | 14 | 0 | 4 | 654 | 196 | 458 | 13 | 64 | 5pts deducted |
| 4 | Illogan Park | 18 | 10 | 0 | 8 | 470 | 310 | 160 | 10 | 45 | 5pts deducted |
| 5 | Redruth Albany | 18 | 7 | 0 | 11 | 271 | 696 | –428 | 4 | 32 |
| 6 | Lankelly–Fowey | 18 | 3 | 0 | 15 | 223 | 779 | –556 | 3 | 15 |
| 7 | Camelford RFC | 18 | 0 | 0 | 18 | 143 | 840 | –697 | 5 | 5 |
Points are awarded as follows: 4 points for a win; 2 points for a draw; 0 points for a loss; 1 point for scoring four tries and/or losing by seven points or less; If teams are level at any stage, tiebreakers are applied in the following order: 1. Number of matches won 2. Difference between points for and against 3. Total number of points for 4. Aggregate number of points scored in matches between tied teams 5. Number of matches won excluding the first match, then the second and so on until the tie is settled
Green background are promotion places.

== See also ==
- English rugby union system
