= 2013–14 Tribute Cornwall/Devon League =

2013–14 Courage Cornwall/Devon League
- Countries: England
- Date: 14 September 2013 – 26 April 2014
- Champions: Exeter University (1st title)
- Runners-up: Tiverton
- Relegated: Newquay Hornets; Veor
- Matches played: 156

The 2013–14 Cornwall/Devon League, known for sponsorship reasons as the Tribute Cornwall/Devon League was the twenty-seventh full season of rugby union within the Cornwall/Devon League, and consisted of seven teams from Devon and six teams from Cornwall. Exeter University, the champions, lost only one match and finished in their highest ever league placing. Tiverton came second and both teams are promoted to Tribute Western Counties West for 2014–15 season. Newquay Hornets and Veor, who won only two matches and promoted the previous season, are both relegated to Tribute Cornwall 1.

== Participating teams and locations ==
The 2013–14 Tribute Cornwall/Devon League consists of thirteen teams, six from Cornwall and seven from Devon; each team playing the others twice, home and away. The season started on 14 September 2013 and ended on 26 April 2014. Joining the nine teams who continued from last season were Exeter Saracens and Honiton, both relegated from Tribute Western Counties West last season. Honiton spent only one season in the higher league having been promoted from this league in 2011–12. Two teams were promoted from the two feeder leagues; Exeter University from Tribute Devon 1 and in their first season at this level, and Veor from Tribute Cornwall 1, who were relegated from this league in 2011–12.

Team	Ground	City/Area	Previous season
Crediton	Blagdon	Crediton, Devon	
Exeter Saracens	Exhibition Fields, Summer Lane	Whipton, Exeter, Devon	Relegated from Tribute Western Counties West
Exeter University	Duckes Meadow, Salmon Pool Lane	Exeter, Devon	Promoted from Tribute Devon League 1
Falmouth	Recreation Ground	Falmouth, Cornwall	
Hayle	Memorial Park	Hayle, Cornwall	
Honiton	Allhallows Playing Field	Honiton, Devon	Relegated from Tribute Western Counties West
Newquay Hornets	Newquay Sports Centre	Newquay, Cornwall	
Old Plymothian & Mannamedian's	King George V Playing Fields	Elburton, Plymouth, Devon	
Pirates Amateurs	Mennaye Field	Penzance, Cornwall	
Saltash	Moorlands Lane	Saltash, Cornwall	
Tiverton	Coronation Field	Tiverton, Devon	
Veor	Wheal Gerry	Camborne, Cornwall	Promoted from Tribute Cornwall 1
Withycombe	Raleigh Park	Withycombe, Exmouth, Devon	

== League table ==
2013–14 Tribute Cornwall/Devon League Table
	Club	Played	Won	Drawn	Lost	Points for	Points against	Points Diff	Bonus Points tries	Bonus Points losses	Points	Points deducted
1	Exeter University	24	23	0	1	1073	327	746	21	0	108	–5
2	Tiverton	24	22	0	2	784	258	526	12	1	101	
3	Withycombe	24	17	0	7	676	392	284	8	3	79	
4	Crediton	24	13	1	10	736	462	274	13	5	72	
5	Honiton	24	13	0	11	589	448	141	8	2	63	
6	Falmouth	24	12	1	11	540	448	92	6	5	61	
7	Saltash	24	11	1	12	679	586	93	10	4	55	–5
8	Hayle	24	10	0	14	560	529	31	7	5	52	
9	Old Plymothian & Mannamedian	24	8	2	14	517	532	–15	9	6	52	
10	Pirates Amateurs	24	9	0	15	415	671	–256	6	4	44	–2
11	Exeter Saracens	24	7	1	16	409	786	–377	7	4	41	
12	Newquay Hornets	24	6	0	18	277	1032	–755	2	2	28	
13	Veor	24	2	0	22	301	1085	–784	3	0	11	
Points are awarded as follows: 1. 4 pts for a win 2. 2 pts for a draw 3. 0 pts for a loss 4. 1 bonus pt for scoring four tries or more in a match 5. 1 bonus pt for losing by seven points or less.; If teams are level at any stage, tiebreakers are applied in the following order: 1. Number of matches won 2. Difference between points for and against 3. Total number of points for 4. Aggregate number of points scored in matches between tied teams 5. Number of matches won excluding the first match, then the second and so on until the tie is settled
Green background are promotion places. Pink background are relegation places. Updated: 23 August 2014

== See also ==
- English rugby union system
- Rugby union in Cornwall
