= Devon League 2 =

English rugby union league

Counties 3 Devon
- Current season or competition: 2025–26 Counties 3 Devon
- Sport: Rugby union
- Instituted: 1987; 39 years ago (as Devon 2A / Devon 2B)
- Ceased: 2018; 8 years ago
- Number of teams: 21
- Country: England
- Most titles: Ilfracombe, Salcombe, Totnes (3 titles)
- Website: englandrugby.com

Counties 3 Devon (formerly Devon League 2, also known as Tribute Devon 2 for sponsorship reasons) is an English level nine rugby union league for clubs based in Devon. Promotion is to Counties 1 Devon. Formerly relegation was to Devon League 3 but after its cancellation in 2003 there was no automatic relegation as this was the lowest division in club rugby union in Devon.

The league was suspended at the end of the 2017–18 season, with teams being either promoted into Devon League 1 or transferred to the Devon Merit Leagues. The league was reinstated following the RFU Adult competition Review which came into effect ahead of the 2022–23 season, but was initially split into East and West divisions before being re-categorised as East & North / South & West ahead of the 2023–24 season.

== Format ==
The results of the matches contributed points to the league as follows:

- 4 points are awarded for a win
- 2 points are awarded for a draw
- 0 points are awarded for a loss, however
- 1 losing (bonus) point are awarded to a team that loses a match by 7 points or fewer
- 1 additional (bonus) point are awarded to a team scoring 4 tries or more in a match.

== 2026-27 ==
=== North & East ===
Departing were Exmouth II, promoted to Counties 2 Devon.

Team	Ground	Capacity	Town/Village	Previous season
Bideford II	King George's Field	2,000	Bideford, Devon	New entry
Cullompton II	Stafford Park		Cullompton, Devon	9th
Exeter Athletic	Bravelands		Clyst St Mary, Devon	8th
Exeter Engineers	Bravelands		Clyst St Mary, Devon	7th
Ilfracombe	Brimlands		Ilfracombe	Re-entry
New Cross	Five Lanes Pitch, Strap Lane		Kingsteignton	6th
Newton Abbot II	Rackerhayes	1,150 (150 stand)	Newton Abbot, Devon	10th
North Tawton	Taw Meadow		North Tawton	5th
Okehampton II	Showground	1,120 (120 seats)	Okehampton, Devon	2nd
Sidmouth II	Blackmore Field		Sidmouth, Devon	4th
Tiverton II	Coronation Field	750 (250 seated)	Tiverton, Devon	3rd
Torrington	Donnacroft		Great Torrington	Promoted from Devon merit leagues

Locations of the 2026-27 Counties 3 Devon North & East teams

=== South & West ===
Departing were Brixham II, promoted to Counties 2 Devon.

Team	Ground	Capacity	Town/Village	Previous season
Dartmouth	Dartmouth Leisure Centre		Dartmouth	Relegated from Counties 2 Devon
Ivybridge II	Cross-in-Hand		Ivybridge, Devon	Relegated from Counties 2 Devon
Kingsbridge II	High House	1,000 (50 seats)	Kingsbridge, Devon	10th
Old Technicians	Weston Mill Oak Villa Social Club		Plymouth	4th
Paignton II	Queen's Park		Paignton, Devon	2nd
Plymouth Argaum	Bickleigh Down		Plymouth, Devon	5th
Plympton Victoria	St.Boniface Arena		Plympton, Plymouth	11th
Plymstock Albion Oaks II	Horsham Playing Fields		Staddiscombe, Plymouth	9th
Salcombe	Two Meads	500	Salcombe	6th
Tamar Saracens	The Parkway		Ernesettle, Plymouth	7th
Torquay Athletic II	Recreation Ground		Torquay, Devon	3rd
Totnes	Borough Park		Totnes	8th

Locations of the 2026-27 Counties 3 Devon South & West teams

== 2025–26 ==
=== North & East ===
Departing were Crediton II, promoted to Counties 2 Devon.

Team	Ground	Capacity	Town/Village	Previous season
Cullompton II	Stafford Park		Cullompton, Devon	8th
Exeter Athletic	Bravelands		Clyst St Mary, Devon	9th
Exeter Engineers	Bravelands		Clyst St Mary, Devon	7th
Exmouth II	Imperial Recreation Ground	1,250 (250 stand)	Exmouth, Devon	Relegated from Counties 2 Devon
New Cross	Five Lanes Pitch, Strap Lane		Kingsteignton	3rd
Newton Abbot II	Rackerhayes	1,150 (150 stand)	Newton Abbot, Devon	10th
North Tawton	Taw Meadow		North Tawton	2nd
Okehampton II	Showground	1,120 (120 seats)	Okehampton, Devon	6th
Sidmouth II	Blackmore Field		Sidmouth, Devon	4th
Tiverton II	Coronation Field	750 (250 seated)	Tiverton, Devon	5th

Locations of the 2025–26 Counties 3 Devon North & East teams

=== South & West ===
Departing were Ivybridge II, promoted to Counties 2 Devon.

Team	Ground	Capacity	Town/Village	Previous season
Brixham II	Astley Park		Brixham, Devon	2nd
Kingsbridge II	High House	1,000 (50 seats)	Kingsbridge, Devon	10th
Old Technicians	Weston Mill Oak Villa Social Club		Plymouth	3rd
Paignton II	Queen's Park		Paignton, Devon	4th
Plymouth Argaum	Bickleigh Down		Plymouth, Devon	Relegated from Counties 2 Devon
Plympton Victoria	St.Boniface Arena		Plympton, Plymouth	8th
Plymstock Albion Oaks II	Horsham Playing Fields		Staddiscombe, Plymouth	9th
Salcombe	Two Meads	500	Salcombe	5th
Tamar Saracens	The Parkway		Ernesettle, Plymouth	Relegated from Counties 2 Devon
Torquay Athletic II	Recreation Ground		Torquay, Devon	6th
Totnes	Borough Park		Totnes	7th

Locations of the 2025–26 Counties 3 Devon South & West teams

== 2024–25 ==
=== North & East ===
Departing were Topsham II, promoted to Counties 2 Devon.

Teignmouth II started but did not complete the season leaving eleven sides to contest the fixtures.

Team	Ground	Capacity	Town/Village	Previous season
Cullompton II	Stafford Park		Cullompton, Devon	4th
Crediton II	Blagdon		Crediton, Devon	3rd
Exeter Athletic	Bravelands		Clyst St Mary, Devon	9th
Exeter Engineers	Bravelands		Clyst St Mary, Devon	New entry
New Cross	Five Lanes Pitch, Strap Lane		Kingsteignton	Runners-up
Newton Abbot II	Rackerhayes	1,150 (150 stand)	Newton Abbot, Devon	10th
North Tawton	Taw Meadow		North Tawton	Relegated from Counties 2 Devon
Okehampton II	Showground	1,120 (120 seats)	Okehampton, Devon	6th
Sidmouth II	Blackmore Field		Sidmouth, Devon	7th
Tiverton II	Coronation Field	750 (250 seated)	Tiverton, Devon	5th

Locations of the 2024–25 Counties 3 Devon North & East teams

=== South & West ===
Departing were Dartmouth and Tamar Saracens, promoted to Couties 2 Devon. Tavistock II (10th) did not return for the new season.

Team	Ground	Capacity	Town/Village	Previous season
Brixham II	Astley Park		Brixham, Devon	4th
Ivybridge II	Cross-in-Hand		Ivybridge, Devon	Relegated from Counties 2 Devon
Kingsbridge II	High House	1,000 (50 seats)	Kingsbridge, Devon	9th
Old Technicians	Weston Mill Oak Villa Social Club		Plymouth	6th
Paignton II	Queen's Park		Paignton, Devon	5th
Plymstock Albion Oaks II	Horsham Playing Fields		Staddiscombe, Plymouth	7th
Plympton Victoria	St.Boniface Arena		Plympton, Plymouth	11th
Salcombe	Two Meads	500	Salcombe	3rd
Torquay Athletic II	Recreation Ground		Torquay, Devon	8th
Totnes	Borough Park		Totnes	12th

Locations of the 2024–25 Counties 3 Devon South & West teams

== 2023–24 ==
The league was redesignated as North & East and South & West for the new season.

=== North & East ===
Departing were Old Plymouthian & Mannamedian, promoted to Counties 2 Devon. Torrington (9th) and Buckfastleigh Ramblers (10th) returned to their respective merit leagues.

Teignmouth II, Topsham II and Okehampton II joined on a level transfer from the West league.

Team	Ground	Capacity	Town/Village	Previous season
Cullompton II	Stafford Park		Cullompton, Devon	6th
Crediton II	Blagdon		Crediton, Devon	Runners-up
Exeter Athletic	Bravelands		Clyst St Mary, Devon	7th
New Cross	Five Lanes Pitch, Strap Lane		Kingsteignton	8th
Newton Abbot II	Rackerhayes	1,150 (150 stand)	Newton Abbot, Devon	4th
Okehampton II	Showground	1,120 (120 seats)	Okehampton, Devon	4th (West)
Sidmouth II	Blackmore Field		Sidmouth, Devon	5th
Teignmouth II	Bitton Park Sports Ground		Teignmouth, Devon	8th (West)
Tiverton II	Coronation Field	750 (250 seated)	Tiverton, Devon	3rd
Topsham II	Bonfire Field		Topsham, Exeter	3rd (West)

Locations of the 2023–24 Counties 3 Devon North & East teams

=== South & West ===
Departing were Plymouth Argaum, promoted to Couties 2 Devon.

Topsham II (3rd), Newton Abbot (4th) and Teignmouth II (8th) went on a level transfer to the North & East division.

Team	Ground	Capacity	Town/Village	Previous season
Brixham II	Astley Park		Brixham, Devon	Relegated from Counties 2 Devon
Dartmouth	Dartmouth Leisure Centre		Dartmouth	7th
Kingsbridge II	High House	1,000 (50 seats)	Kingsbridge, Devon	New entry
Old Technicians	Weston Mill Oak Villa Social Club		Plymouth	6th
Paignton II	Queen's Park		Paignton, Devon	9th
Plymstock Albion Oaks II	Horsham Playing Fields		Staddiscombe, Plymouth	10th
Plympton Victoria	St.Boniface Arena		Plympton, Plymouth	Re-entry
Salcombe	Two Meads	500	Salcombe	5th
Tamar Saracens	The Parkway		Ernesettle, Plymouth	Runners-up
Tavistock II	Sandy Park	500	Tavistock, Devon	New entry
Torquay Athletic II	Recreation Ground		Torquay, Devon	New entry
Totnes	Borough Park		Totnes	11th

Locations of the 2023–24 Counties 3 Devon South & West teams

== 2022–23 ==
The league was reinstated following the RFU Adult competition Review which saw the competition split into East and West divisions.

=== East ===
Team	Ground	Capacity	Town/Village	Previous season
Buckfastleigh Ramblers	Buckfastleigh Sports Club		Buckfastleigh	Devon League 1 (13th)
Cullompton II	Stafford Park		Cullompton, Devon	New entry
Crediton II	Blagdon		Crediton, Devon	New entry
Exeter Athletic	Bravelands		Clyst St Mary, Devon	Devon League 1 (6th)
New Cross	Five Lanes Pitch, Strap Lane		Kingsteignton	Devon League 1 (3rd)
Okehampton II	Showground	1,120 (120 seats)	Okehampton, Devon	New entry
Old Plymouthian & Mannamedian	King George V Playing Fields		Plymstock, Plymouth	Devon League 1 (4th)
Sidmouth II	Blackmore Field		Sidmouth, Devon	New entry
Tiverton II	Coronation Field	750 (250 seated)	Tiverton, Devon	New entry
Torrington	Donnacroft		Great Torrington	Devon League 1 (11th)

Locations of the 2022–23 Counties 3 Devon East teams

=== West ===
Team	Ground	Capacity	Town/Village	Previous season
Dartmouth	Dartmouth Leisure Centre		Dartmouth	Devon League 1 (12th)
Newton Abbot II	Rackerhayes	1,150 (150 stand)	Newton Abbot, Devon	New entry
Old Technicians	Weston Mill Oak Villa Social Club		Plymouth	Devon League 1 (7th)
Paignton II	Queen's Park		Paignton, Devon	New entry
Plymouth Argaum	Bickleigh Down		Plymouth, Devon	Devon League 1 (9th)
Plymstock Albion Oaks II	Horsham Playing Fields		Staddiscombe, Plymouth	New entry
Salcombe	Two Meads	500	Salcombe	Devon League 1 (8th)
Tamar Saracens	The Parkway		Ernesettle, Plymouth	Devon League 1 (5th)
Teignmouth II	Bitton Park Sports Ground	1,210 (210 stand)	Teignmouth, Devon	New entry
Topsham II	Bonfire Field		Topsham, Exeter	New entry
Totnes	Borough Park		Totnes	Devon League 1 (10th)

Locations of the 2022–23 Counties 3 Devon West teams

== 2018–2022 ==
Not contested.

== 2017–18 ==
The season started on 28 October 2017 and the last matches were played on 24 February 2018

=== Participating clubs and locations ===
Ground	Capacity	Town/Village	Previous season	
Buckfastleigh Ramblers	Buckfastleigh Sports Club		Buckfastleigh	4th
Devonport HSOB	Stonehouse Creek		Devonport, Plymouth	6th
Ilfracombe	Brimlands		Ilfracombe	Relegated from Devon 1 (8th)
North Tawton	Taw Meadow		North Tawton	Relegated from Devon 1 (7th)
Old Plymouthian & Mannamedian		King George V Playing Fields	Plymstock, Plymouth	3rd
Plympton Victoria	St.Boniface Arena		Plympton, Plymouth	7th
St Columba & Torpoint	Defiance Field		Torpoint, Cornwall	8th
Salcombe	Two Meads	500	Salcombe	5th

Locations of the 2017–18 Devon 2 teams

== 2016–17 ==
=== Participating clubs ===
Team	Ground	Capacity	Town/Village	Previous season
Buckfastleigh Ramblers	Buckfastleigh Sports Club		Buckfastleigh	4th
Dartmouth	Dartmouth Leisure Centre		Dartmouth	5th
Devonport HSOB	Stonehouse Creek		Devonport, Plymouth	8th
Old Plymouthian & Mannamedian	King George V Playing Fields		Plymstock, Plymouth	relegated from Devon 1
Old Technicians	Weston Mill Oak Villa Social Club		Plymouth	3rd
Plympton Victoria	St.Boniface Arena		Plympton, Plymouth	7th
St Columba & Torpoint	Defiance Field		Torpoint, Cornwall	relegated from Devon 1
Salcombe	Two Meads	500	Salcombe	6th

=== Final table ===
2016–17 Devon League 2 Final Table
Pos	Team	P	W	D	L	F	A	Diff	Try bonus	Loss bonus	Pts	Notes
1	Dartmouth (P)	14	13	0	1	407	120	287	7	0	60
2	Old Technicians (P)	14	11	1	2	264	125	139	3	1	53
3	Old Plymothian & Mannamedian	14	10	1	3	449	131	318	5	0	47
4	Buckfastleigh Ramblers	14	8	0	6	366	181	185	5	3	35	5 pts deducted
5	Salcombe	14	6	0	8	259	241	18	3	3	26	4 pts deducted
6	Devonport HSOB	14	4	0	10	213	235	−22	3	4	8	15 pts deducted
7	Plympton Victoria	14	2	0	12	95	589	−494	0	1	5	4 pts deducted
8	St Columba & Torpoint	14	1	0	13	61	492	−431	0	0	−6	10 pts deducted
Points are awarded as follows: 4 points for a win; 2 points for a draw; 0 points for a loss; 1 point for scoring four tries; 1 point for losing by seven points or less; If teams are level at any stage, tiebreakers are applied in the following order: 1. Number of matches won 2. Difference between points for and against 3. Total number of points for 4. Aggregate number of points scored in matches between tied teams 5. Number of matches won excluding the first match, then the second and so on until the tie is settled
Green background are the promotion place. There is no relegation.

== 2015–16 ==
=== Participating clubs and locations ===
Locations of the 2015–16 Devon 2

Team	Ground	Capacity	Town/Village	Previous season
Buckfastleigh Ramblers	Buckfastleigh Sports Club		Buckfastleigh	6th
Dartmouth	Dartmouth Leisure Centre		Dartmouth	5th
Devonport HSOB	Stonehouse Creek		Devonport, Plymouth	7th
Ilfracombe	Brimlands		Ilfracombe	4th
Old Technicians	Weston Mill Oak Villa Social Club		Plymouth	Relegated from Devon 1 (8th)
Plympton Victoria	St.Boniface Arena		Plympton, Plymouth	8th
Salcombe	Two Meads	500	Salcombe	3rd
Torrington	Donnacroft		Torrington	Relegated from Devon 1 (9th)

== 2014–15 ==
North Tawton came first and were promoted to Devon 1 along with the runner-up Tamar Saracens. Both teams won thirteen of their fourteen matches; losing just the one match away to each other.

== 2013–14 ==
=== Participating clubs ===
Team	Ground	Capacity	Town/Village	Previous season
Buckfastleigh Ramblers	Buckfastleigh Sports Club		Buckfastleigh	
Dartmouth	Dartmouth Leisure Centre		Dartmouth	
Devonport HSOB	Stonehouse Creek		Devonport	
Ilfracombe	Brimlands		Ilfracombe	
North Tawton	Taw Meadow		North Tawton	
Plymouth Argaum	Bickleigh Down		Plymouth	
Plympton Victoria	St.Boniface Arena		Plympton	
Tamar Saracens	The Parkway		Ernesettle, Plymouth	
Torrington	Donnacroft		Torrington	

=== Final table ===
2013–14 Devon League 2 Final Table
Pos	Team	P	W	D	L	F	A	Diff	Try bonus	Loss bonus	Pts	Notes
1	Plymouth Argaum (P)	16	14	0	2	647	140	507	10	1	67
2	Torrington (P)	16	12	0	4	450	142	308	7	2	58
3	Tamar Saracens	16	11	0	5	564	152	412	8	3	55
4	Dartmouth	16	9	0	7	320	365	−45	5	1	43
5	North Tawton	16	11	0	5	471	183	288	7	3	34	20 pts deducted
6	Buckfastleigh Ramblers	16	7	0	9	315	326	−11	3	2	33
7	Ilfracombe	16	6	0	10	257	322	−65	4	2	26	5 pts deducted
8	Devonport HSOB	16	2	0	14	111	753	−642	0	0	3	5 pts deducted
9	Plympton Victoria	16	0	0	16	95	847	−752	0	0	−10	10pts deducted
Points are awarded as follows: 4 points for a win; 2 points for a draw; 0 points for a loss; 1 point for scoring four tries; 1 point for losing by seven points or less; If teams are level at any stage, tiebreakers are applied in the following order: 1. Number of matches won 2. Difference between points for and against 3. Total number of points for 4. Aggregate number of points scored in matches between tied teams 5. Number of matches won excluding the first match, then the second and so on until the tie is settled
Green background are the promotion places (subject to a possible re-organisation of the league structure). There is no relegation.

== 2012–13 ==
=== Participating clubs ===
- Buckfastleigh Ramblers
- Devonport HSOB
- Ilfracombe
- North Tawton
- Plymouth Argaum
- Plympton Victoria
- St Columba & Torpoint
- Tamar Saracens

=== Final table ===
2012–13 Devon 2 Final Table
Pos	Team	P	W	D	L	F	A	Diff	Try bonus	Loss bonus	Pts	Pts Adjusted
1	Old Technicians (P)	16	14	1	1	518	87	431	7	1	67	+8 points
2	St Columba & Torpoint (P)	15	10	1	4	322	99	223	7	2	53	+10 points
3	Plymouth Argaum	16	9	0	7	388	155	233	7	5	48	+12 points
4	North Tawton	16	10	1	5	349	217	132	3	0	45	+3 points
5	Tamar Saracens	16	7	1	8	242	211	31	3	4	37	+7 points
6	Ilfracombe	15	6	2	7	208	153	55	4	0	29	0
7	Buckfastleigh Ramblers	16	6	0	10	220	350	−130	1	2	27	+3 points
8	Devonport HSOB	14	3	0	11	88	488	−400	0	0	9	−4 points
9	Plympton Victoria	14	1	0	13	77	652	−575	0	2	–9	−13 pts
Points are awarded as follows: 4 points for a win; 2 points for a draw; 0 points for a loss; 1 point for scoring four tries; 1 point for losing by seven points or less; If teams are level at any stage, tiebreakers are applied in the following order: 1. Number of matches won 2. Difference between points for and against 3. Total number of points for 4. Aggregate number of points scored in matches between tied teams 5. Number of matches won excluding the first match, then the second and so on until the tie is settled
Green background are the promotion places.

== Original teams ==
When league rugby began in 1987 this division was split into two regional leagues known as Devon 2A and Devon 2B and contained the following teams:

=== Devon 2A ===
Devon 2A was for teams based in Plymouth and the surrounding area.

- Devonport HSOB (Note: 'Old Boys' team for Devonport High School For Boys.)
- Jesters (Note: Jesters RFC would later be incorporated into Old Plymothian & Mannamedian RFC and would be the name for their 2nd XV.)
- Plympton (Note: Plympton would later merge with Victoria to form Plympton Victoria RFC in 1996.)
- Plymouth YMCA (Note: Plymouth YMCA RFC is no longer active.)
- Old Public Oaks (Note: Old Public Oaks would merge with Plymstock in 2007 to form Plymstock Albion Oaks RFC.)
- Old Plymothian & Mannamedian
- Tamar Saracens
- St Columba & Torpoint (Note: Despite being based in Cornwall, St Columba & Torpoint play in the Devon leagues.)
- Victoria (Note: Victoria would later merge with Plympton to form Plympton Victoria RFC in 1996.)

=== Devon 2B ===
Devon 2B was for teams based in the rest of Devon.

- Cullompton
- Dartmouth
- North Tawton
- Salcombe
- Tavistock
- Topsham
- Withycombe

== Devon League 2 honours ==
=== Devon League 2A / 2B (1987–1992) ===
The original Devon 2 (sponsored by Courage) was split into two tier 10 regional leagues – Devon 2A (Plymouth region) and Devon 2B (rest of Devon). Promotion was to Devon 1 and there was no relegation.

Devon League 2A / 2B
Season	No of teams	Champions	Runners-up	Relegated team(s)	League name	Ref
1987–88	9	Devonport HSOB	Victoria	No relegation	Devon 2A	
1987–88	7	Cullompton	Dartmouth	No relegation	Devon 2B	
1988–89	9	Prince Rock	Jesters	No relegation	Devon 2A	
1988–89	7	Topsham	Tavistock	No relegation	Devon 2B	
1989–90	10	Jesters	Old Public Oaks	No relegation	Devon 2A	
1989–90	8	Ilfracombe	Dartmouth	No relegation	Devon 2B	
1990–91	10	Old Public Oaks	Prince Rock	No relegation	Devon 2A	
1990–91	7	Honiton	Kingsbridge	No relegation	Devon 2B	
1991–92	10	Old Plymothian & Mannamedian	Plymouth Argaum	No relegation	Devon 2A	
1991–92	7	Tavistock	Kingsbridge	No relegation	Devon 2B	
Green backgrounds are promotion places.

=== Devon League 2 (1992–1993) ===
Ahead of the 1992–93 season Devon 2A and 2B were merged into a single tier 10 division known as Devon 2. Promotion continued to Devon 1 and there was no relegation. The league continued to be sponsored by Courage.

Devon League 2
Season	No of teams	Champions	Runners-up	Relegated team(s)	Ref
1992–93	14	Withycombe	Dartmouth	No relegation	
Green backgrounds are promotion places.

=== Devon League 2 (1993–96) ===
The creation of National 5 South for the 1993–94 season meant that Devon 2 dropped to become a tier 11 league. Promotion continued to Devon 1 and there was no relegation until the introduction of Devon 3 at the end of the 1995–96 season. The league continued to be sponsored by Courage.

Devon League 2
Season	No of teams	Champions	Runners-up	Relegated team(s)	Ref
1993–94	12	Salcombe	Prince Rock	No relegation	
1994–95	12	Totnes	Cullomption	No relegation	
1995–96	12	Tamar Saracens	Torrington	Plymouth YMCA, Plympton Victoria, Jesters, Axminster (Note: Multiple clubs were relegated to the newly introduced Devon 3. Relegated Jesters would drop out of the leagues and later become amalgamated with Old Plymothian & Mannamedian.)	
Green backgrounds are promotion places.

=== Devon League 2 (1996–2003) ===
The cancellation of National 5 South at the end of the 1995–96 season saw Devon 2 return to being a tier 10 division. Promotion continued to Cornwall/Devon and relegation was now down to the new Devon 3.

Devon League 2
Season	No of teams	Champions	Runners-up	Relegated team(s)	Ref
1996–97	10	Ilfracombe	Dartmouth	St Columba	
1997–98	10	Cullompton	Wessex	Bovey Tracey	
1998–99	10	Totnes	Tamar Saracens	Prince Rock Woodland Fort, Devonport HSOB	
1999–00	10	Exeter Saracens	Topsham	Plymouth YMCA, Dartmouth	
2000–01	8	Devonport HSOB	Old Public Oaks	Plymouth Argaum, North Tawton, Buckfastleigh Ramblers	
2001–02	8	Topsham	Exeter Saracens	Plympton Victoria, Plymouth Barbarians, Marjon	
2002–03	7	Plymstock Albion Oaks	Totnes	No relegation (Note: The cancellation of Devon 3 at the end of the 2002–03 season meant there was no relegation.)	
Green backgrounds are promotion places.

=== Devon League 2 (2003–2009) ===
Devon 2 continued as a tier 10 league with promotion to Devon 1. However, the cancellation of Devon 3 at the end of the 2002–03 meant that there was no longer relegation. From the 2008–09 season onward the league sponsor is Tribute.

Devon League 2
Season	No of teams	Champions	Runners-up	Relegated team(s)	Ref
2003–04	10	Buckfastleigh Ramblers	Dartmouth	No relegation	
2004–05	10	Prince Rock Woodland Fort	Plymouth Barbarians	No relegation	
2005–06	10	Tamar Saracens	Exeter Saracens	No relegation	
2006–07	9	Totnes	Topsham	No relegation	
2007–08	8	Salcombe	St Columba & Torpoint	No relegation	
2008–09	9	New Cross	Old Technicians	No relegation	
Green backgrounds are promotion places.

=== Devon 1 South & West (2009–2010) ===
For a solitary season Devon 2 was known as Devon 1 South & West. It remained a tier 10 league with promotion to Devon 1 and there was no relegation. Tribute continued to sponsor the league.

Devon 1 South & West
Season	No of teams	Champions	Runners-up	Relegated team(s)	Ref
2009–10	9	Salcombe	Tamar Saracens	No relegation	
Green backgrounds are promotion places.

=== Devon League 2 (2010–2018) ===
Devon 1 South & West was renamed back to Devon 2 for the 2010–11 season onward. It continued as a tier 10 league with promotion to Devon 1 and there was no relegation. Tribute continued to sponsor the league. At the end of the 2017–18 season Devon 2 was disbanded and all teams transferred into either Devon 1 or the Devon Merit Leagues.

Devon League 2
Season	No of teams	Champions	Runners-up	Relegated team(s)	Ref
2010–11	9	St Columba & Torpoint	Topsham	No relegation	
2011–12	9	Exeter University	Dartmouth	No relegation	
2012–13	9	Old Technicians	St Columba & Torpoint	No relegation	
2013–14	9	Plymouth Argaum	Torrington	No relegation	
2014–15	9	North Tawton	Tamar Saracens	No relegation	
2015–16	8	Ilfracombe	Torrington	No relegation	
2016–17	8	Dartmouth	Old Technicians	No relegation	
2017–18	8	North Tawton	Buckfastleigh Ramblers (Note: 3rd placed Old Plymothian & Mannamedian also promoted.)	No relegation	
Green backgrounds are promotion places.

== Number of league titles ==
- Ilfracombe (3) (Note: One of Ilfracombe's titles was for Devon 2B.)
- Salcombe (3) (Note: One of Salcombe's titles was when league was known as Devon 1 South & West.)
- Totnes (3)
- Cullompton (2) (Note: One of Cullompton's titles was for Devon 2B.)
- Devonport HSOB (2) (Note: One of Devonport HSOB's titles was for Devon 2A.)
- North Tawton (2)
- Prince Rock Woodland Fort (2) (Note: Prince Rock Woodland Fort's titles include one won when known as Prince Rock and was for Devon 2A.)
- Tamar Saracens (2)
- Topsham (2) (Note: One of Topsham's titles was for Devon 2B.)
- Buckfastleigh Ramblers (1)
- Dartmouth (1)
- Exeter Saracens (1)
- Exeter University (1)
- Honiton (1) (Note: Honiton's title was for Devon 2B.)
- Jesters (1) (Note: Jesters title was for Devon 2A.)
- New Cross (1)
- Old Plymothian & Mannamedian (1) (Note: Old Plymothian & Mannamedian's title was for Devon 2A.)
- Old Public Oaks (1) (Note: Old Public Oaks title was for Devon 2A. Club currently known as Plymstock Albion Oaks RFC.)
- Old Technicians (1)
- Plymouth Argaum (1)
- Plymstock Albion Oaks (1)
- St Columba & Torpoint (1)
- Tavistock (1) (Note: Tavistock's title was for Devon 2B.)
- Withycombe (1)

== See also ==
- South West Division RFU
- Devon RFU
- Devon 1
- Devon 3
- English rugby union system
- Rugby union in England
