= 2007–08 Cornwall League 1 =

Tribute Cornwall 1
- Countries: England
- Champions: Saltash
- Runners-up: Helston
- Relegated: None

The Cornwall League 1 2007–08 was a full season of rugby union within Cornwall League 1.

== Team changes ==
Saltash as Champions, were promoted to the Tribute Cornwall/Devon League for season 2008–09. There was no relegation into Cornwall 1 and no relegation into Cornwall League 2.

== Table ==
Cornwall League 2007–08
Pos	Team	Pld	W	D	L	PF	PA	PD	Pts
1	Saltash (Note: Promoted to Cornwall/Devon League) (P)	16	14	0	2	392	121	+271	28
2	Helston (Note: Helston lost to Plymstock Albion Oakes in the promotion play–off) (Q)	16	13	0	3	303	161	+142	26
3	Liskeard-Looe	16	12	1	3	505	132	+373	25
4	St Austell	16	10	0	6	412	178	+234	20
5	Stithians	16	9	1	6	433	190	+243	19
6	Perranporth	16	4	0	12	184	320	−136	8
7	Roseland	16	4	0	12	144	412	−268	8
8	St Just	16	3	0	13	79	554	−475	6
9	Bodmin	16	2	0	14	106	490	−384	2 (Note: 2 pts deducted)

Rules for classification: Points are awarded as follows: 2 points for a win, 1 point for a draw, 0 points for a loss
(P) Promoted; (Q) Qualified for the phase indicated
