= 2007–08 Cornwall League 2 =

Rugby union season

Tribute Cornwall 2
- Countries: England
- Champions: Illogan Park
- Runners-up: Redruth Albany
- Matches played: 56

The Cornwall League 2 2007–08 was a full season of rugby union within Cornwall League 2.

== Team changes ==
There was no promotion or relegation for the following season, 2008–09, and the number of teams in Cornwall League 2 fell from eight teams to six as Illogan Park and Callington withdrew from the league

== Table ==
Cornwall League 2 2007-08
Pos	Team	Pld	W	D	L	PF	PA	PD	Pts
1	Illogan Park (C)	14	12	1	1	413	116	+297	25
2	Redruth Albany	14	9	1	4	309	152	+157	19
3	Camborne School of Mines	14	8	2	4	237	195	+42	18
4	St Day	14	8	1	5	249	194	+55	17
5	St Agnes	14	5	2	7	294	206	+88	12
6	Lankelly-Fowey	14	5	1	8	163	275	−112	11
7	Veor	14	4	0	10	147	428	−281	8
8	Callington	14	1	0	13	98	344	−246	−2 (Note: 4 points deducted)

Rules for classification: Points are awarded as follows: 2 points for a win, 1 point for a draw, 0 points for a loss
(C) Champions

== See also ==
- Trelawney's Army Cornwall rugby website
