= 2011–12 Tribute Cornwall League 1 =

Tribute Cornwall 1
- Countries: England
- Champions: Saltash
- Runners-up: Helston
- Promoted: Saltash
- Matches played: 63

The Tribute Cornwall League 1 2011–12 was a full season of rugby union within Cornwall League 1.

== Team changes ==
Saltash as Champions, are promoted to the Tribute Cornwall/Devon League for season 2012–13. Helston will play against the runners–up from Tribute Devon 1 for a place in the Tribute Cornwall/Devon League.

== Table ==
Tribute Cornwall League 1 2011-12
Pos	Team	P	W	D	L	F	A	Diff	Pts	Notes
1	Saltash	18	17	0	1	814	184	630	86	Promoted
2	Helston	18	14	0	4	501	250	251	67
3	St Just	18	11	0	7	441	333	108	54
4	Stithians	18	7	0	11	177	384	-207	32
5	Roseland	18	5	0	13	246	472	-132	21	points adjusted
6	Bodmin	18	5	0	13	221	554	-233	20	points adjusted
7	Camborne School of Mines	18	4	0	14	186	409	-223	15	points adjusted

Points are awarded as follows:

- 4 points for a win
- 2 points for a draw
- 0 points for a loss
- 1 point for scoring four tries and/or losing a match by seven points or less
