= 1992–93 Cornwall League 2 =

Cornwall 2
- Countries: England
- Champions: Helston
- Runners-up: Wadebridge Camels
- Matches played: 30

The Cornwall League 2 1992–93 was a full season of rugby union within Cornwall League 2.

== Table ==
Cornwall League 2 1992-93
Pos	Team	P	W	D	L	F	A	Diff	Pts	Notes
1	Helston	10	9	0	1	312	101	211	18
2	Wadebridge Camels	10	7	0	3	190	75	115	14
3	St Agnes	10	7	0	3	201	175	26	14
4	St Day	10	4	0	6	177	201	-24	8
5	Lankelly-Fowey	10	2	1	7	100	215	-115	5
6	Roseland	10	0	1	9	69	282	-213	1

Points are awarded as follows:

- 2 points for a win
- 1 points for a draw
- 0 points for a loss
