= 2010–11 Cornwall League 1 =

Rugby union competition in England

Tribute Cornwall 1
- Countries: England
- Champions: Veor
- Runners-up: Pirates Amateurs
- Relegated: St. Day, Perranporth, Illogan Park, St. Agnes, Redruth Albany

The Cornwall League 1 2010–11 was a full season of rugby union within Cornwall League 1.

== Team changes ==
Veor promoted as champions and Pirates Amateurs promoted to the Tribute Cornwall/Devon League, after beating Wessex (Tribute Devon 1) in a playoff. St Day, Perranporth, Illogan Park, St Agnes and Redruth Albany are relegated to the re–formed Tribute Cornwall 2. Lankelly–Fowey withdrew during the season and their results were expunged from the table; they will start next season in Tribute Cornwall 2 as well.

== Table ==
Tribute Cornwall League 2010-11
Pos	Team	Pld	W	D	L	PF	PA	PD	B	Pts
1	Veor	20	19	0	1	640	159	+481	14	92
2	Pirates Amateurs	20	17	0	3	670	204	+466	13	82
3	Helston	20	12	1	7	449	249	+200	12	63
4	St Just	19	12	1	6	416	226	+190	6	57
5	Camborne School of Mines	19	11	1	7	432	232	+200	8	50
6	Bodmin	20	9	1	10	319	305	+14	5	45
7	St Day	20	10	1	9	217	414	−197	3	45
8	Perranporth	20	5	1	14	313	469	−156	7	29
9	Illogan Park	20	5	0	15	231	705	−474	4	19
10	St Agnes	20	2	0	18	218	634	−416	5	13
11	Redruth Albany	20	3	2	15	205	567	−362	3	4

Rules for classification: Points are awarded as follows:
- 4 points for a win
- 2 points for a draw
- 0 points for a loss
- 1 point for a loss by seven points or less
- 1 point for 4 tries or more

=== Play–off ===
23 April 2011

Pirates Amateurs	29–20	Wessex RFC
Try: A Gwennap 29' M Westren 33' J Trezise T Edwards 47' S Stone 89'; Con: S. Powell, M Westren		Try: D Morris 21' R Hart; Con: T. Gwynne; Drop: A Alderman 12' T Gwynne 22'

Mennaye Field, Penzance
Attendance: 400
