= Veor RFC =

English rugby union football club

- Full name: Veor Rugby Football Club
- Union: Cornwall RFU
- Founded: 1966; 59 years ago
- Location: Camborne, Cornwall, England
- Ground: Blaythornes holmans sports centre (Capacity: 850)
- Chairman: Scott Lake
- Coach(es): Chris Instance (forwards) & Joe Parma (Head) Dan Arthur (S&C) Adam Coombes (team manager) Ben Page (lineout)
- Captain(s): Akiva Eaton & Pean gale (vice)
- League: Counties 2 Cornwall
- 2023–24: 5th
Team kit

Official website
- www.pitchero.com/clubs/veor/

Veor Rugby Football Club is a Cornish and English rugby union football club based in Camborne, Cornwall. The club, founded in 1966, play in amber and black at the Holmans Sports Centre. They are one of two teams in the town, along with neighbours, Camborne RFC. They currently play in Counties 2 Cornwall – a league at level 8 of the English rugby union system – following their promotion as champions of Cornwall 1 at the end of the 2018–19 season.

== History ==
With the advent of the league rugby union in 1987 Veor were placed in Cornwall 2 – a basement league ranked at level 10 of the English rugby union system – which they promptly won in their first season. This early success was replicated the next season when they won the Cornwall Clubs Cup (then known as the Knockout Plate) for the first time in their history. During the 1990s the club continued to build, achieving another promotion to reach the Cornwall/Devon League. Although they managed to remain at level 8 for several more year, Veor had to withdraw from Cornwall/Devon during the 1998-99 season, and were automatically relegated two levels down to Cornwall 2.

After struggling in Cornwall 2 at the start of the 21st century, Veor has started to move up the leagues once more, returning to the Cornwall/Devon League several times but being able to remain at level 8 for longer than a season on each occasion. In 2014–15 Veor were second in Tribute Cornwall 1, an English level nine league in the England rugby union structure. They played the runner-up from Tribute Devon 1 for a place in Tribute Cornwall/Devon League. By the end of the season, Veor won the CRFU Cornwall Clubs Cup for the third time in their history beating local rivals Lanner 10 – 7 in the final held at St Clement's in Truro.

After five seasons in Cornwall 1, Veor won the 2018–19 league championship and promotion back to Tribute Cornwall/Devon.

== Ground ==
Since 2016 Veor have played home games at the Memorial Ground, just off Boundervean Lane on the outskirts of Camborne. The Memorial Ground is also occupied by Camborne RFC who play their 1st XV fixtures nearby at the much larger Recreation Ground. Previously Veor had played at Wheal Gerry (also in Camborne) where they had been based for 60 years but had to move after being given notice to leave. Thankfully for Veor they were given the opportunity to share the Memorial Ground with Camborne RFC.

Facilities at the ground are fairly basic with standing space for at least 500 spectators, although more are possible with limited viewing. Parking is also non-existent on the country lane nearby, although the ground is five minutes or less walk from the Recreation Ground where easier parking can be made nearby and Camborne RFC have also made the Crane Park clubhouse available for team players and supporters.

== Season summary ==
| Season | League | | | National Cup(s) | | County Cup(s) | |
| Season | Competition/Level | Position | Points | Competition | Performance | Competition | Performance |
|---|---|---|---|---|---|---|---|
| 1987–88 | Cornwall 2 (10) | 1st (promoted) | 6 | | | | |
| 1988–89 | Cornwall 1 (9) | | | | | Cornwall Junior Knockout Plate | Winners |
| 1989–90 | Cornwall 1 (9) | | | | | | |
| 1990–91 | Cornwall 1 (9) | | | | | | |
| 1991–92 | Cornwall 1 (9) | | | | | | |
| 1992–93 | Cornwall 1 (9) | 1st (promoted) | | | | | |
| 1993–94 | Cornwall/Devon (8) | | | | | | |
| 1994–95 | Cornwall/Devon (8) | | | | | | |
| 1995–96 | Cornwall/Devon (8) | | | | | | |
| 1996–97 | Cornwall/Devon (8) | N/A (withdrew) (Note: During the 1996–97 season Veor withdrew Cornwall/Devon and were automatically demoted two levels to Cornwall 2.) | N/A | | | | |
| 1997–98 | Cornwall 2 (9) | 2nd (promoted) | 18 | | | | |
| 1998–99 | Cornwall 1 (9) | 9th (relegated) | -2 | | | | |
| 1999–00 | Cornwall 2 (10) | 7th | 5 | | | | |
| 2000–01 | Cornwall 2 (10) | 4th | 10 | | | | |
| 2001–02 | Cornwall 2 (10) | 3rd | 20 | | | | |
| 2002–03 | Cornwall 2 (10) | 7th | 4 | | | Cornwall Clubs Cup | |
| 2003–04 | Cornwall 2 (10) | 6th | 8 | Powergen Junior Vase | | | |
| 2004–05 | Cornwall 2 (10) | 5th | 8 | Powergen Junior Vase | | | |
| 2005–06 | Cornwall 2 (10) | 8th | 6 | Powergen Junior Vase | | | |
| 2006–07 | Cornwall 2 (10) | 8th | -2 | EDF Energy Junior Vase | Preliminary Round | | |
| 2007–08 | Cornwall 2 (10) | 7th | 8 | | | | |
| 2008–09 | Cornwall 2 (10) | 1st (promoted) | 29 | | | Cornwall Clubs Cup | Quarter-finals |
| 2009–10 | Cornwall 1 (9) | 2nd (lost playoff) | 36 | | | | |
| 2010–11 | Cornwall 1 (9) | 1st (promoted) | 92 (Note: The 2010–11 season would see the introduction of bonus points into lower league English rugby union (tier 6 and below).) | | | Cornwall Clubs Cup | Runners up |
| 2011–12 | Cornwall/Devon (8) | 12th (relegated) | 44 | | | | |
| 2012–13 | Cornwall 1 (9) | 1st (promoted) | 78 | | | Cornwall Clubs Cup | Winners |
| 2013–14 | Cornwall/Devon (8) | 13th (relegated) | 11 | | | Cornwall Cup | 1st Round |
| 2014–15 | Cornwall 1 (9) | 2nd (lost playoff) | 50 | | | Cornwall Clubs Cup | Winners |
| 2015–16 | Cornwall 1 (9) | 3rd | 47 | RFU Junior Vase | 4th Round | Cornwall Clubs Cup | Runners up |
| 2016–17 | Cornwall 1 (9) | 4th | 32 | | | Cornwall Clubs Cup | Semi-finals |
| 2017–18 | Cornwall 1 (9) | 4th | 38 | | | | |
| 2018–19 | Cornwall 1 (9) | 1st (promoted) | 63 | RFU Junior Vase | 1st Round | Cornwall Clubs Cup | Runners up |
| 2019–20 | Cornwall/Devon (8) | 9th | 46.80 (Note: The season was postponed and ultimately cancelled due to the COVID-19 pandemic in the United Kingdom with Veor sitting in 9th, having played 20 games and gained 39 points. The remaining games were calculated on a 'best playing record formula', with Veor remaining in 9th place with 46.80 points.) | | | | |
| 2020–21 | Cornwall/Devon (8) | | | | | | |
Green background stands for either league champions (with promotion) or cup winners. Blue background stands for promotion without winning league or losing cup finalists. Pink background stands for relegation.

== Honours ==
- Cornwall League 2 champions (2): 1987–88, 2008–09
- Cornwall Clubs Cup winners (3): 1989–90, 2012–13, 2014–15
- Cornwall League 1 champions (4): 1992–93, 2010–11, 2012–13, 2018–19

== See also ==
- Cornish rugby
