= 1987–88 Courage Cornwall League 2 =

Rugby union competition in England

Courage Cornwall League 2
- Countries: England
- Champions: Veor
- Runners-up: Lankelly–Fowey
- Promoted: Veor and Lankelly–Fowey
- Relegated: None
- Matches played: 10

The Courage Cornwall League 2 1987–88 was the first full season of rugby union within the Cornwall League 2. Each team played one match against each of the other teams, playing a total of four matches with two at home and two away. Veor the first champions and Lankelly–Fowey, as runners–up, were promoted to the Cornwall League 1 for season 1988–89. RAF St Mawgan finished in last place in what was their only season in the rugby union league system. St Day and Ormdale originally entered the league but did not complete their fixtures.

== Table ==
1987–88 Courage League Cornwall Two table
Pos	Team	Pld	W	D	L	PF	PA	PD	Pts	Promotion
1	Veor (C)	4	3	0	1	34	19	+15	6	Promoted
2	Lankelly–Fowey	4	2	1	1	37	39	−2	5	Promoted
3	Redruth GSOB	4	2	0	2	41	25	+16	4	
4	Roseland	4	2	0	2	21	45	−24	4	
5	RAF St Mawgan	4	0	1	3	16	21	−5	1	

Rules for classification: Points were awarded as follows: 2 pts for a win, 1 pt for a draw, 0 pts for a loss.
(C) Champions
