= Devon League 3 =

Defunct English rugby union league

- Current season or competition: 2002–03 Devon League 3
- Sport: Rugby union
- Instituted: 1996; 30 years ago
- Ceased: 2003; 23 years ago
- Number of teams: 6
- Country: England
- Holders: Salcombe (1st title) (2002–03) (promoted to Devon 2)
- Most titles: Prince Rock Woodland Fort (2 titles)

Devon League 3 was an English level eleven rugby union league for clubs based in Devon. The champions were promoted to Devon League 2 and, as this was the lowest division in club rugby within Devon, there was no relegation. The league was introduced ahead of the 1996–97 season and ran for seven seasons until it was cancelled at the end of the 2002–03 season, with all teams promoted into Devon League 2.

== Original teams ==
When this division was introduced in 1996 it contained the following teams:

- Axminster - relegated from Devon 2 (9th)
- Buckfastleigh Ramblers - new to league
- Devonport HSOB (Note: Old Boys side for Devonport High School for Boys.) - new to league
- Marjon (Note: Rugby team of Plymouth Marjon University.) - new to league
- Plymouth YMCA (Note: Plymouth YMCA RFC no longer exists as a rugby club.) - relegated from Devon 2 (12th)
- Plympton Victoria - relegated from Devon 2 (11th)
- Wessex (Note: Wessex would merge with Exeter Youth to form Exeter Athletic RFC in 2018.) - new to league
- Woodland Fort (Note: Woodland Fort would later merger with Prince Rock to form Prince Rock Woodland Fort RFC. The club has since disbanded.) - new to league

Jesters were also relegated from Devon 2 and should have joined Devon 3. However, they dropped out of the leagues and would become amalgamated with Old Plymothian & Mannamedian.

== Devon League 3 honours ==
Devon 3 was a tier 11 league. Promotion was to Devon 2 and there was no relegation.

Devon League 3
Season	No of teams	Champions	Runners-up	Relegated team(s)	Ref
1996–97	8	Wessex	Marjon	No relegation	
1997–98	7	Devonport HSOB	Plymstock	No relegation	
1998–99	6	Plymouth YMCA	Buckfastleigh Ramblers	No relegation	
1999–00	8	Prince Rock Woodland Fort	Devonport HSOB	No relegation	
2000–01	6	Dartmouth	Plympton Victoria	No relegation	
2001–02	6	Prince Rock Woodland Fort	North Tawton	No relegation	
2002–03	6	Salcombe	Plymouth Barbarians (Note: Due to the cancellation of Devon 3 at the end of the season, all six clubs were promoted into Devon 2, including Buckfastleigh Ramblers, St Columba & Torpoint, Plymouth Argaum and Plympton Victoria.)	No relegation	
Green backgrounds are promotion places.

== Number of league titles ==
- Prince Rock Woodland Fort (2)
- Dartmouth (1)
- Devonport HSOB (1)
- Plymouth YMCA (1)
- Salcombe (1)
- Wessex (1)

== See also ==
- South West Division RFU
- Devon RFU
- Devon 1
- Devon 2
- English rugby union system
- Rugby union in England
