= 2011–12 Tribute Cornwall/Devon League =

- Countries: England
- Champions: Tavistock
- Runners-up: Honiton
- Promoted: Tavistock and Honiton
- Relegated: Veor, Totnes and Torrington
- Matches played: 182

The Tribute Cornwall/Devon League 2011–12 was the 25th full season of rugby union within the Cornwall/Devon League and consisted of eight teams from Devon and six teams from Cornwall. Tavistock as champions and Honiton as runners–up were promoted to the Tribute Western Counties West for season 2012–13, whilst Veor was relegated to Tribute Cornwall One, and Totnes and Torrington were relegated to Tribute Devon One for season 2012–13.

== Table ==
2011–2012 Tribute Cornwall/Devon League Table
	Club	Played	Won	Drawn	Lost	Points for	Points against	Points Diff	Bonus Points	Points	Points deducted
1	Tavistock	26	21	0	5	846	291	555	19	103	
2	Honiton	26	20	0	6	717	351	366	17	97	
3	Teignmouth	26	19	0	7	708	399	309	15	91	
4	Withycombe	26	16	2	8	539	401	138	12	80	
5	Hayle	26	14	0	12	613	416	197	19	75	
6	Crediton	26	15	1	10	575	482	93	11	73	
7	Falmouth	26	14	1	11	526	435	91	9	67	
8	Pirates Amateurs	26	13	3	10	618	564	54	9	62	–5
9	Newquay Hornets	26	11	0	15	596	547	49	15	59	
10	Liskeard–Looe	26	10	1	15	423	582	-159	10	52	
11	Plymouth Barbarians	26	10	2	14	397	530	-123	5	49	
12	Veor	26	9	0	17	424	618	-194	8	44	
13	Totnes	26	3	0	23	263	907	-644	4	11	–5
14	Torrington	26	2	0	24	147	879	-732	3	11	
Points are awarded as follows: four points for a win; two points for a draw; no points for a loss; one bonus point for scoring four tries or more in a match; one bonus point for losing by seven points or less.; If teams are level at any stage, tiebreakers are applied in the following order: (1) difference between points for and against; (2) total number of points for...
Green background are promotion places. Pink background are relegation places.

== See also ==
- English rugby union system
