= Camelford RFC =

Rugby club in Cornwall, England

- Full name: Camelford Rugby Football Club
- Union: Cornwall RFU
- Nickname(s): The Ford
- Founded: 2008; 17 years ago
- Location: Camelford, Cornwall, England
- Ground(s): Lane End (Capacity: 500)
- Chairman: Ian Elford
- Coach(es): Wayne Roberts & Jamie Belsey
- Captain(s): Mike Willshire
- Most caps: Ian Elford (100) Jon Ponting (100)
- League(s): Cornwall 2
- 2018-19: 4th
Team kit

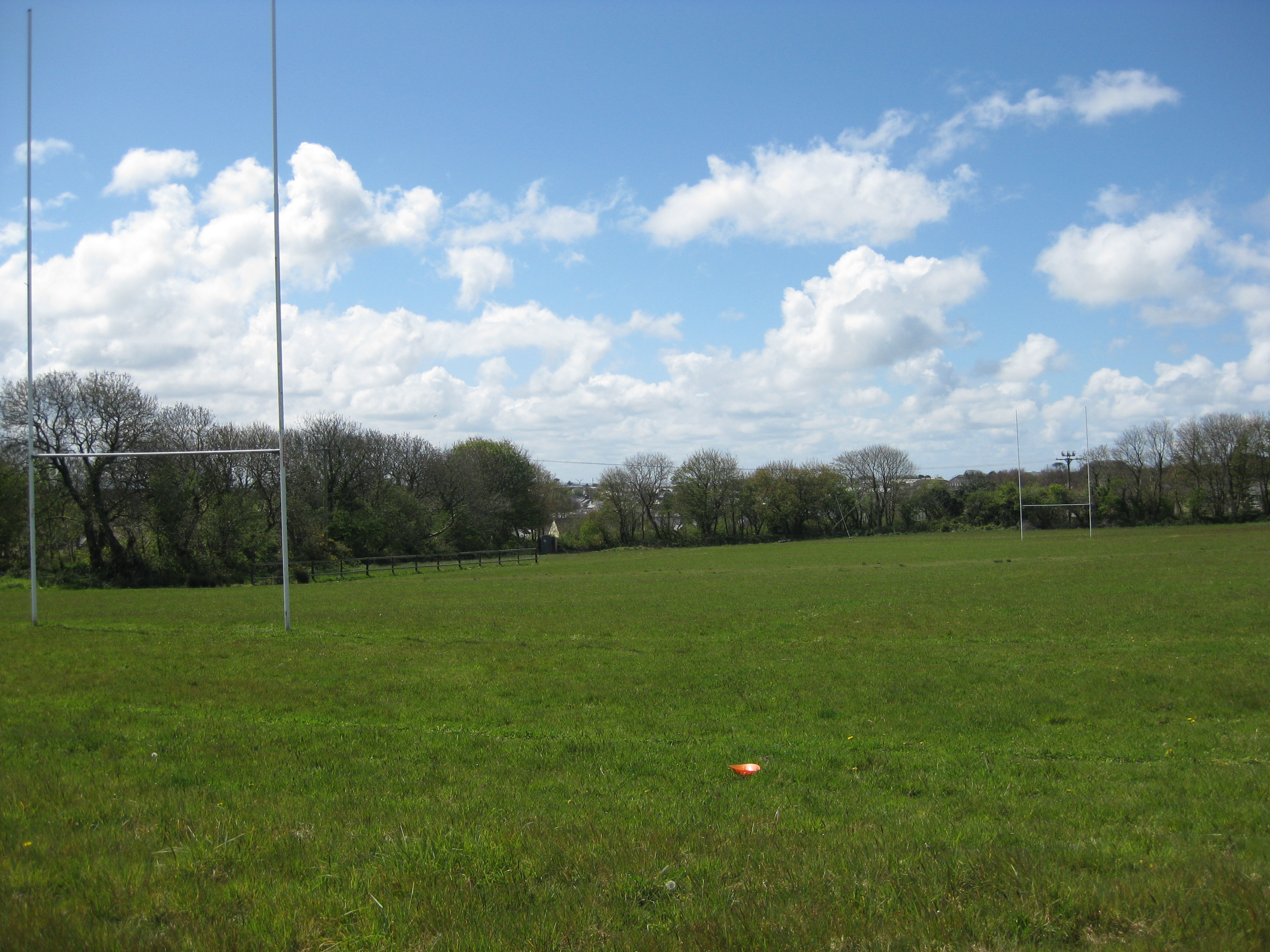
Lane End - home ground of Camelford RFC

Camelford Rugby Football Club are an English and Cornish rugby union club that are based in the town of Camelford in north-east Cornwall and were founded in 2008. They currently operate a men's team that play in Cornwall League 2 - a league that is ranked at tier 10 of the English rugby union system.

== History ==
Camelford RFC was formed in 2008. During the club's first two seasons they played friendly matches, mainly against Cornish opposition and in 2010 entered the Cornwall Merit Table, finishing 7th. 2011 was their first season in league rugby after being accepted to play in the Tribute Cornwall League Two. Since then they have gone from strength to strength, finishing third on both occasions during the 2013–14 and 2014-15 Cornwall 2 seasons.

== Ground ==
Camelford plays its home games at Lane End (Tregoodwell Lane) on the outskirts of the town. Facilities are basic, with no club-house and just the one open pitch with space for around 500 supporters standing. Although there is no parking available at the ground, visitors can park nearby in town (five minute walk). As Camelford has limited public transport, arriving by car is essential.

== Season summary ==
Season	League			National Cup(s)		County Cup(s)	
Season	Competition/Level	Position	Points	Competition	Performance	Competition	Performance
2008–09	N/A (Note: Camelford played friendly games during the 2008–09 season.)	N/A	N/A			Cornwall Clubs Cup	1st Round
2009–10	Cornwall Merit Table B	7th	26			Cornwall Clubs Cup	Quarter-finals
2010–11	N/A (Note: Camelford played friendly games during the 2010–11 season.)	N/A	N/A			Cornwall Clubs Cup	1st Round
2011–12	Cornwall 2 (10)	7th	5			Cornwall Clubs Cup	1st Round
2012–13	Cornwall 2 (10)	5th	28			Cornwall Clubs Cup	1st Round
2013–14	Cornwall 2 (10)	3rd	34	RFU Junior Vase	1st Round	Cornwall Clubs Cup	1st Round
2014–15	Cornwall 2 (10)	3rd	24	RFU Junior Vase	2nd Round	Cornwall Clubs Cup	1st Round
2015–16	Cornwall 2 (10)	3rd	24			Cornwall Clubs Cup	Group Stage
2016–17	Cornwall 2 (10)	7th	0				
2017–18	Cornwall 2 (10)	4th	20				
2018–19	Cornwall 2 (10)	4th	15	RFU Junior Vase	Quarter-finals		
2019–20	Cornwall 2 (10)						
Green background stands for either league champions (with promotion) or cup winners. Blue background stands for promotion without winning league or losing cup finalists. Pink background stands for relegation.

== See also ==
- Cornish rugby
