= Counties 3 Cornwall =

English level nine rugby union league

- Current season or competition: 2025–26 Counties 3 Cornwall
- Sport: Rugby union
- Instituted: 1987; 39 years ago
- Number of teams: 8
- Country: England
- Holders: Launceston II XV (1st title) (2024–25) (promoted to Counties 2 Cornwall)
- Most titles: St Agnes (6 titles)

Counties 3 Cornwall (formerly known as Tribute Cornwall League 2) is an English level nine rugby union league for clubs based in Cornwall. The champions and runner-up are promoted to Counties 2 Cornwall (formerly Cornwall League 1); there is no relegation. The league ran continuously since 1987–88, except for a two-season break, when Cornwall 2 combined with Cornwall League 1 for seasons 2009–10 and 2010–11. The competition recommenced in 2011–12 when it was decided to form two leagues of seven teams each.

For the 2016–17 season Cornwall 1 and Cornwall 2 were amalgamated to create the Cornwall League with fifteen teams playing each other once in the first phase. After Christmas the teams split into two leagues with the top eight playing in Cornwall One and the remainder playing in Cornwall Two. For the 2018–19 season Cornwall League 1 and Cornwall League 2 reverted to separate divisions. The RFU reorganised the league system in 2022, renaming the league Counties 3 Cornwall.

Launceston II XV are the current champions and are promoted to Counties 2 Cornwall. St Agnes are the most successful team having won the league on six occasions.

== Format ==
The season runs from September to April and the results of the matches contribute points to the league as follows:

- 4 points are awarded for a win
- 2 points are awarded for a draw
- 0 points are awarded for a loss, however
- 1 losing (bonus) point is awarded to a team that loses a match by 7 points or fewer
- 1 additional (bonus) point is awarded to a team scoring 4 tries or more in a match.

== 2026-27 ==
Departing were St Agnes promoted to Counties 2 Cornwall.

The league will be contested in two phases with all clubs playing 13 fixtures before it then splits into the top eight and bottom six clubs who will then play a further seven or five fixtures respectively.

| Team | Ground | Capacity | Town/Village | Previous season |
|---|---|---|---|---|
| Bodmin | Clifden Park | | Bodmin | Relegated from Counties 2 Cornwall |
| Bude II | Bencoolen Meadow | 750 | Bude, Cornwall | Re-entry |
| Camborne School of Mines | Memorial Park, Kernick Road | | Penryn | 5th |
| Falmouth II | Recreation Ground | 3,000 | Falmouth, Cornwall | Re-entry |
| Hayle | Memorial Park | | Hayle | 8th |
| Helston II | King George V Playing Field | 2,500 | Helston | New entry |
| Illogan Park | Paynters Lane Playing Field | | Illogan | 3rd |
| Lankelly-Fowey | Lankelly Farm | | Fowey | 6th |
| Pirates Amateurs II | Mennaye Field | 4,000 (2,200 seats) | Penzance, Cornwall | New entry |
| Redruth Albany | Trewirgie Road | | Redruth | Re-entry |
| Roseland | Philleigh Rugby Field | | Philleigh | 7th |
| Saltash II | Moorlands Lane | | Saltash | 4th |
| St Ives II | Recreation Ground | 3,000 (275 seats) | St Ives | 2nd |
| Veor | Memorial Ground | 500 | Camborne | Re-entry |

Locations of the 2026-27 Counties 3 Cornwall teams

== 2025–26 ==
Departing were Launceston II promoted to Counties 2 Cornwall, while Hayle were relegated from Counties 2 Cornwall and Lankelly-Fowey rejoined the league. At the beginning of the season the league was due to be contested by twelve sides; however, over the course of the season four teams withdrew (see below) leaving eight sides to contest the fixtures.

- Bude II
- Falmouth II
- Redruth Albany
- Veor

| Team | Ground | Capacity | Town/Village | Previous season |
|---|---|---|---|---|
| Camborne School of Mines | Memorial Park, Kernick Road | | Penryn | 7th |
| Hayle | Memorial Park | | Hayle | Relegated from Counties 2 Cornwall |
| Illogan Park | Paynters Lane Playing Field | | Illogan | 6th |
| Lankelly-Fowey | Lankelly Farm | | Fowey | Re-entry |
| Roseland | Philleigh Rugby Field | | Philleigh | 3rd |
| Saltash II | Moorlands Lane | | Saltash | 4th |
| St Agnes | Enys Parc | | St Agnes | 2nd |
| St Ives II | Recreation Ground | 3,000 (275 seats) | St Ives | 5th |

Locations of the 2025–26 Counties 3 Cornwall teams

=== League table ===
2025–26 Counties 3 Cornwall Table
| Pos | Team | P | W | D | L | F | A | Diff | Try bonus | Loss bonus | Pts | Pts adj |
|---|---|---|---|---|---|---|---|---|---|---|---|---|
| 1 | St Agnes (P) | 14 | 12 | 0 | 2 | 521 | 253 | 268 | 11 | 0 | 59 |
| 2 | St Ives II | 14 | 10 | 0 | 4 | 501 | 267 | 234 | 12 | 1 | 53 |
| 3 | Illogan Park | 14 | 10 | 0 | 4 | 331 | 226 | 105 | 8 | 3 | 51 |
| 4 | Saltash II | 14 | 6 | 0 | 8 | 386 | 578 | −192 | 10 | 0 | 34 |
| 5 | Camborne School of Mines | 14 | 6 | 1 | 7 | 418 | 364 | 54 | 7 | 2 | 30 | −5 |
| 6 | Lankelly-Fowey | 14 | 5 | 0 | 9 | 271 | 425 | −154 | 7 | 1 | 29 | −1 |
| 7 | Roseland | 14 | 4 | 1 | 9 | 328 | 419 | −91 | 7 | 1 | 27 | −1 |
| 8 | Hayle | 14 | 2 | 0 | 12 | 231 | 455 | −224 | 3 | 1 | 7 | −5 |
Points are awarded as follows: 4 points for a win; 2 points for a draw; 0 points for a loss; 1 point for scoring four tries; 1 point for losing by seven points or less; If teams are level at any stage, tiebreakers are applied in the following order: 1. Number of matches won 2. Difference between points for and against 3. Total number of points for 4. Aggregate number of points scored in matches between tied teams 5. Number of matches won excluding the first match, then the second and so on until the tie is settled
Green background is the promotion place. There is no relegation. Updated: 15 June 2026

== 2024–25 ==
=== Participating teams and locations ===
Departing were Hayle and Wadebridge Camels II, promoted to Counties 2 Cornwall. Relegated from Counties 2 Cornwall were Illogan Park (11th) and Camborne School of Mines (12th), while Truro II, St Ives II and Penryn II joined the league.

At the start of the season the league was due to be contested by fifteen sides; over the course of the season the following teams withdrew (2023–24 finishing position shown in brackets) leaving just seven sides to contest the fixtures.

- Bude II (12th)
- Camborne II (4th)
- Falmouth II (10th)
- Lankelly-Fowey (7th)
- Penryn II (n/a)
- Redruth Albany (11th)
- St Austell III (5th)
- Truro II (n/a)

| Team | Ground | Capacity | Town/Village | Previous season |
|---|---|---|---|---|
| Camborne School of Mines | Memorial Park, Kernick Road | | Penryn | Relegated from Counties 2 Cornwall |
| Illogan Park | Paynters Lane Playing Field | | Illogan | Relegated from Counties 2 Cornwall |
| Launceston II | Polson Bridge | 3,000 (194 seats) | Launceston | 3rd |
| Roseland | Philleigh Rugby Field | | Philleigh | 9th |
| Saltash II | Moorlands Lane | | Saltash | 8th |
| St Agnes | Enys Parc | | St Agnes | 6th |
| St Ives II | Recreation Ground | 3,000 (275 seats) | St Ives | New entry |

Locations of the 2024–25 Counties 3 Cornwall teams

=== League table ===
2024–25 Counties 3 Cornwall Table
| Pos | Team | P | W | D | L | F | A | Diff | Try bonus | Loss bonus | Pts | Pts adj |
|---|---|---|---|---|---|---|---|---|---|---|---|---|
| 1 | Launceston II (P) | 12 | 9 | 0 | 3 | 294 | 196 | 98 | 8 | 1 | 47 | +2 |
| 2 | St Agnes | 12 | 8 | 1 | 3 | 245 | 182 | 63 | 4 | 0 | 39 | +1 |
| 3 | Roseland | 12 | 6 | 0 | 6 | 276 | 316 | −40 | 4 | 2 | 30 | 0 |
| 4 | Saltash II | 12 | 5 | 1 | 6 | 299 | 282 | 17 | 5 | 1 | 29 | +1 |
| 5 | St Ives II | 12 | 6 | 2 | 4 | 236 | 240 | −4 | 4 | 0 | 27 | −5 |
| 6 | Illogan Park | 12 | 3 | 0 | 9 | 119 | 246 | −127 | 1 | 2 | 12 | −3 |
| 7 | Camborne School of Mines | 12 | 3 | 0 | 9 | 191 | 198 | −7 | 5 | 4 | 6 | −15 |
Points are awarded as follows: 4 points for a win; 2 points for a draw; 0 points for a loss; 1 point for scoring four tries; 1 point for losing by seven points or less; If teams are level at any stage, tiebreakers are applied in the following order: 1. Number of matches won 2. Difference between points for and against 3. Total number of points for 4. Aggregate number of points scored in matches between tied teams 5. Number of matches won excluding the first match, then the second and so on until the tie is settled
Green background are promotion places. There is no relegation. Updated: 30 October 2025

== 2023–24 ==
Departing were Perranporth and St. Just, both promoted to Counties 2 Cornwall.

=== Participating teams and locations ===
| Team | Ground | Capacity | Town/Village | Previous season |
|---|---|---|---|---|
| Bude II | Bencoolen Meadow | 750 | Bude, Cornwall | 9th |
| Camborne II | Recreation Ground | 7,000 (780 seats) | Camborne | 3rd |
| Falmouth II | Recreation Ground | 3,000 | Falmouth, Cornwall | First season |
| Hayle | Memorial Park | | Hayle | Relegated from Counties 2 Cornwall (12th) |
| Lankelly-Fowey | Lankelly Farm | | Fowey | 8th |
| Launceston II | Polson Bridge | 3,000 (194 seats) | Launceston | 5th |
| Redruth Albany | Trewirgie Road | | Redruth | 10th |
| Roseland | Philleigh Rugby Field | | Philleigh | 7th |
| Saltash II | Moorlands Lane | | Saltash | First season |
| St Agnes | Enys Parc | | St Agnes | 4th |
| St Austell III | Tregorrick Park | 4,000 (300 seats) | St Austell | First season |
| Wadebridge Camels II | Molesworth Field | 500 | Wadebridge | 6th |

Locations of the 2023–24 Cornwall League 2 teams

=== League table ===
2023–24 Counties 3 Cornwall Table
| Pos | Team | P | W | D | L | F | A | Diff | Try bonus | Loss bonus | Pts | Pts adj |
|---|---|---|---|---|---|---|---|---|---|---|---|---|
| 1 | Hayle | 22 | 20 | 1 | 1 | 912 | 228 | 684 | 16 | 0 | 99 |
| 2 | Wadebridge Camels II | 22 | 20 | 0 | 2 | 1064 | 238 | 826 | 17 | 0 | 97 |
| 3 | Launceston II | 22 | 15 | 1 | 6 | 883 | 364 | 519 | 15 | 2 | 79 |
| 4 | Camborne II | 22 | 15 | 1 | 6 | 603 | 330 | 273 | 12 | 2 | 72 | −5 |
| 5 | St Austell III | 22 | 12 | 2 | 8 | 441 | 381 | 60 | 10 | 2 | 60 | −5 |
| 6 | St Agnes | 22 | 11 | 1 | 10 | 592 | 473 | 119 | 10 | 2 | 59 |
| 7 | Lankelly-Fowey | 22 | 10 | 0 | 12 | 467 | 581 | −114 | 10 | 4 | 55 |
| 8 | Saltash II | 22 | 8 | 1 | 13 | 505 | 763 | –258 | 11 | 2 | 48 |
| 9 | Roseland | 22 | 8 | 2 | 12 | 379 | 532 | −153 | 5 | 2 | 45 |
| 10 | Falmouth II | 22 | 6 | 1 | 15 | 333 | 616 | –283 | 6 | 2 | 31 | −5 |
| 11 | Redruth Albany | 22 | 1 | 0 | 21 | 145 | 1304 | −1159 | 2 | 0 | 6 |
| 12 | Bude II | 22 | 1 | 0 | 21 | 242 | 756 | −514 | 4 | 1 | −6 | −15 |
Points are awarded as follows: 4 points for a win; 2 points for a draw; 0 points for a loss; 1 point for scoring four tries; 1 point for losing by seven points or less; If teams are level at any stage, tiebreakers are applied in the following order: 1. Number of matches won 2. Difference between points for and against 3. Total number of points for 4. Aggregate number of points scored in matches between tied teams 5. Number of matches won excluding the first match, then the second and so on until the tie is settled
Green background are promotion places. There is no relegation. Updated: 1 September 2024

== 2022–23 ==
Ten teams competed this season with Perranporth, Redruth Albany and St Just returning from the 2021–22 competition. Lankelly-Fowey, Roseland and St Agnes were relegated from Cornwall 1, while, four club 2nd teams joined the league; Bude II, Camborne II, Launceston II and Wadebridge Camels II.

=== Participating teams and locations ===
| Team | Ground | Capacity | Town/Village | Previous season |
|---|---|---|---|---|
| Bude II | Bencoolen Meadow | 750 | Bude, Cornwall | First season |
| Camborne II | Recreation Ground | 7,000 (780 seats) | Camborne | First season |
| Launceston II | Polson Bridge | 3,000 (194 seats) | Launceston | First season |
| Lankelly-Fowey | Lankelly Farm | | Fowey | Relegated from Cornwall League 1 (6th) |
| Perranporth | Ponsmere Valley | | Perranporth | 2nd |
| Redruth Albany | Trewirgie Road | | Redruth | 4th |
| Roseland | Philleigh Rugby Field | | Philleigh | Relegated from Cornwall League 1 (5th) |
| St Agnes | Enys Parc | | St Agnes | Relegated from Cornwall League 1 (7th) |
| St Just | Tregeseal | | Tregeseal, St Just | (3rd) |
| Wadebridge Camels II | Molesworth Field | 500 | Wadebridge | First season |

Locations of the 2022–23 Cornwall League 2 teams

=== League table ===
2022–23 Counties 3 Cornwall Table
| Pos | Team | P | W | D | L | F | A | Diff | Try bonus | Loss bonus | Pts | Pts adj |
|---|---|---|---|---|---|---|---|---|---|---|---|---|
| 1 | Perranporth | 18 | 16 | 0 | 2 | 808 | 200 | 608 | 15 | 1 | 80 |
| 2 | St Just | 18 | 13 | 0 | 5 | 505 | 225 | 280 | 8 | 1 | 62 |
| 3 | Camborne II | 18 | 13 | 0 | 5 | 600 | 259 | 341 | 11 | 2 | 61 | −5 |
| 4 | St Agnes | 18 | 11 | 0 | 7 | 639 | 319 | 320 | 11 | 1 | 57 |
| 5 | Launceston II | 18 | 10 | 0 | 8 | 566 | 332 | 234 | 9 | 2 | 47 | −5 |
| 6 | Wadebridge Camels II | 18 | 8 | 1 | 9 | 385 | 514 | −129 | 7 | 0 | 42 |
| 7 | Roseland | 18 | 7 | 1 | 10 | 431 | 456 | −25 | 8 | 2 | 40 |
| 8 | Lankelly-Fowey | 18 | 8 | 0 | 10 | 532 | 474 | 58 | 11 | 0 | 38 | −5 |
| 9 | Bude II | 18 | 3 | 0 | 15 | 300 | 602 | −302 | 4 | 2 | 18 |
| 10 | Redruth Albany | 18 | 0 | 0 | 18 | 86 | 1471 | −1385 | 1 | 0 | 1 |
Points are awarded as follows: 4 points for a win; 2 points for a draw; 0 points for a loss; 1 point for scoring four tries; 1 point for losing by seven points or less; If teams are level at any stage, tiebreakers are applied in the following order: 1. Number of matches won 2. Difference between points for and against 3. Total number of points for 4. Aggregate number of points scored in matches between tied teams 5. Number of matches won excluding the first match, then the second and so on until the tie is settled
Green background are promotion places. There is no relegation. Updated: 29 March 2023

== 2021–22 ==
=== Participating teams and locations ===
Stithians, who finished 4th in 2019–20, returned for 2021–22 but withdrew from the league in September 2021, consequently it ran with five teams instead.

| Team | Ground | Capacity | Town/Village | Previous season |
|---|---|---|---|---|
| Camelford | Lane End | 500 | Camelford | 5th |
| Perranporth | Ponsmere Valley | | Perranporth | 3rd |
| Redruth Albany | Trewirgie Road | | Redruth | 6th |
| St Ives | Recreation Ground | 3,000 (275 seats) | St Ives | withdrew from South West 1 West in 2019–20 |
| St Just | Tregeseal | | Tregeseal, St Just | relegated from Cornwall 1 |

Locations of the 2021–22 Cornwall League 2 teams

=== League table ===
2021–22 Cornwall League 2 Table
| Pos | Team | P | W | D | L | F | A | Diff | Try bonus | Loss bonus | Pts | Pts adj |
|---|---|---|---|---|---|---|---|---|---|---|---|---|
| 1 | St Ives | 8 | 8 | 0 | 0 | 302 | 9 | 293 | 5 | 0 | 40 |
| 2 | Perranporth | 8 | 6 | 0 | 2 | 171 | 92 | 79 | 2 | 0 | 28 |
| 3 | St Just | 8 | 4 | 0 | 4 | 297 | 195 | 102 | 4 | 1 | 21 |
| 4 | Redruth Albany | 8 | 2 | 0 | 6 | 58 | 348 | −290 | 1 | 0 | 0 | −10 |
| 5 | Camelford | 8 | 0 | 0 | 8 | 59 | 243 | −184 | 1 | 0 | −9 | −10 |
Points are awarded as follows: 4 points for a win; 2 points for a draw; 0 points for a loss; 1 point for scoring four tries; 1 point for losing by seven points or less; If teams are level at any stage, tiebreakers are applied in the following order: 1. Number of matches won 2. Difference between points for and against 3. Total number of points for 4. Aggregate number of points scored in matches between tied teams 5. Number of matches won excluding the first match, then the second and so on until the tie is settled
Green background are promotion places. There is no relegation. Updated: 25 July 2022

== 2020–21 ==
Due to the COVID-19 pandemic, the 2020–21 season was cancelled.

== 2019–20 ==
=== Participating teams and locations ===
| Team | Ground | Capacity | Town/Village | Previous season |
|---|---|---|---|---|
| Camelford | Lane End | 500 | Camelford | 4th |
| Helston | King George V Playing Field | 2,500 | Helston | Relegated from Cornwall 1 (8th) |
| Perranporth | Ponsmere Valley | | Perranporth | 3rd |
| Redruth Albany | Trewirgie Road | | Redruth | 6th |
| Roseland | Philleigh Rugby Field | | Philleigh | Relegated from Cornwall 1 (7th) |
| Stithians | Playing Field | | Stithians | 5th |

Locations of the 2019–20 Cornwall League 2 teams

=== League table ===
2019–20 Cornwall League 2 Table
| Pos | Team | P | W | D | L | F | A | Diff | Try bonus | Loss bonus | Pts | Notes |
|---|---|---|---|---|---|---|---|---|---|---|---|---|
| 1 | Roseland | 10 | 9 | 0 | 1 | 433 | 63 | 370 | 7 | 0 | 43 |
| 2 | Helston | 10 | 7 | 1 | 2 | 364 | 80 | 284 | 6 | 2 | 38 |
| 3 | Perranporth | 10 | 7 | 1 | 2 | 297 | 96 | 201 | 6 | 0 | 36 |
| 4 | Stithians | 10 | 3 | 0 | 7 | 142 | 257 | −115 | 2 | 1 | 15 |
| 5 | Camelford | 10 | 3 | 0 | 7 | 125 | 381 | −256 | 3 | 0 | 15 |
| 6 | Redruth Albany | 10 | 0 | 0 | 10 | 72 | 556 | −484 | 0 | 0 | 0 |
Points are awarded as follows: 4 points for a win; 2 points for a draw; 0 points for a loss; 1 point for scoring four tries; 1 point for losing by seven points or less; If teams are level at any stage, tiebreakers are applied in the following order: 1. Number of matches won 2. Difference between points for and against 3. Total number of points for 4. Aggregate number of points scored in matches between tied teams 5. Number of matches won excluding the first match, then the second and so on until the tie is settled
Green background are promotion places. There is no relegation. Updated: 4 October 2021

== 2018–19 ==
=== Participating teams and locations ===
| Team | Ground | Capacity | Town/Village | Previous season |
|---|---|---|---|---|
| Camelford | Lane End | 500 | Camelford | 4th |
| Perranporth | Ponsmere Valley | | Perranporth | 6th |
| Redruth Albany | Trewirgie Road | | Redruth | 7th |
| St Agnes | Enys Parc | | St Agnes | Relegated from Cornwall 1 (8th) |
| St Just | Tregeseal | | Tregeseal, St Just | 3rd |
| Stithians | Playing Field | | Stithians | 5th |

Locations of the 2018–19 Cornwall League 2 teams

=== League table ===
2018–19 Cornwall League 2 Table
| Pos | Team | P | W | D | L | F | A | Diff | Try bonus | Loss bonus | Pts | Pts adjusted |
|---|---|---|---|---|---|---|---|---|---|---|---|---|
| 1 | St Agnes | 10 | 10 | 0 | 0 | 346 | 18 | 328 | 5 | 0 | 42 | −5 |
| 2 | St Just | 10 | 7 | 0 | 3 | 176 | 174 | 2 | 3 | 0 | 33 |
| 3 | Perranporth | 10 | 7 | 0 | 3 | 397 | 68 | 329 | 6 | 1 | 31 | −5 |
| 4 | Camelford | 10 | 3 | 0 | 7 | 106 | 318 | −212 | 1 | 1 | 15 |
| 5 | Stithians | 10 | 3 | 0 | 7 | 149 | 227 | −78 | 3 | 0 | 0 | −15 |
| 6 | Redruth Albany | 10 | 0 | 0 | 10 | 33 | 402 | −369 | 0 | 0 | −5 | −5 |
Points are awarded as follows: 4 points for a win; 2 points for a draw; 0 points for a loss; 1 point for scoring four tries; 1 point for losing by seven points or less; If teams are level at any stage, tiebreakers are applied in the following order: 1. Number of matches won 2. Difference between points for and against 3. Total number of points for 4. Aggregate number of points scored in matches between tied teams 5. Number of matches won excluding the first match, then the second and so on until the tie is settled
Green background are promotion places. There is no relegation. Updated: 5 October 2021

== 2017–18 ==
=== League table (phase 2) ===
2017–18 Cornwall League 2 Table
| Pos | Team | P | W | D | L | F | A | Diff | Try bonus | Loss bonus | Pts | Points adjusted |
|---|---|---|---|---|---|---|---|---|---|---|---|---|
| 1 | Helston | 12 | 12 | 0 | 0 | 360 | 39 | 321 | 9 | 0 | 60 |
| 2 | Lankelly-Fowey | 12 | 9 | 0 | 3 | 348 | 173 | 175 | 7 | 0 | 44 |
| 3 | St Just | 12 | 6 | 0 | 6 | 96 | 203 | −107 | 1 | 1 | 24 | −5 |
| 4 | Camelford | 12 | 5 | 0 | 7 | 150 | 241 | −91 | 3 | 0 | 20 | −5 |
| 5 | Stithians | 12 | 5 | 1 | 6 | 178 | 142 | 36 | 4 | 1 | 19 | −10 |
| 6 | Perranporth | 11 | 3 | 1 | 7 | 143 | 182 | −39 | 1 | 2 | 12 | −5 |
| 7 | Redruth Albany | 11 | 0 | 0 | 11 | 71 | 366 | −295 | 0 | 2 | −13 | −15 |
Points are awarded as follows: 4 points for a win; 2 points for a draw; 0 points for a loss; 1 point for scoring four tries; 1 point for losing by seven points or less; If teams are level at any stage, tiebreakers are applied in the following order: 1. Number of matches won 2. Difference between points for and against 3. Total number of points for 4. Aggregate number of points scored in matches between tied teams 5. Number of matches won excluding the first match, then the second and so on until the tie is settled
Green background are promotion places. There is no relegation. Updated: 7 October 2021

== 2016–17 ==
For the current season Cornwall 1 and Cornwall 2 have been amalgamated to create the Cornwall League with fifteen teams playing each other once in the first phase. After Christmas the teams split into two leagues with the top eight playing in Cornwall One and the remainder playing in Cornwall Two.

=== Participating clubs (phase 2) ===
Locations of the 2016–17 Cornwall 2 (phase 2) teams

| Team | Ground | Town/Village | Phase one |
|---|---|---|---|
| Camelford RFC | Lane End | Camelford | 14th |
| Illogan Park | Paynters Lane Playing Field | Illogan | 13th |
| Lankelly-Fowey RFC | Lankelly Farm | Fowey | 11th |
| Perranporth | Ponsmere Valley | Perranporth | 9th |
| Redruth Albany | Trewirgie Road | Redruth | 15th |
| St Just | Tregeseal | St Just | 12th |
| Stithians | Playing Field | Stithians | 10th |

=== League table (phase 2) ===
2016–17 Cornwall League 2 Table
| Pos | Team | P | W | D | L | F | A | Diff | Try bonus | Loss bonus | Pts | Notes |
|---|---|---|---|---|---|---|---|---|---|---|---|---|
| 1 | Lankelly-Fowey | 12 | 10 | 0 | 2 | 266 | 131 | 135 | 6 | 2 | 50 |
| 2 | Illogan Park | 12 | 10 | 0 | 2 | 249 | 68 | 181 | 5 | 2 | 49 |
| 3 | Stithians | 12 | 9 | 0 | 3 | 150 | 106 | 44 | 1 | 2 | 43 |
| 4 | St Just | 12 | 6 | 0 | 6 | 281 | 230 | 51 | 4 | 2 | 32 |
| 5 | Redruth Albany | 12 | 4 | 0 | 8 | 55 | 193 | −138 | 1 | 1 | 11 |
| 6 | Perranporth | 12 | 3 | 0 | 9 | 111 | 146 | −35 | 1 | 2 | −14 |
| 7 | Camelford | 12 | 0 | 0 | 12 | 22 | 206 | −184 | 0 | 0 | −15 |
Points are awarded as follows: 4 points for a win; 2 points for a draw; 0 points for a loss; 1 point for scoring four tries; 1 point for losing by seven points or less; If teams are level at any stage, tiebreakers are applied in the following order: 1. Number of matches won 2. Difference between points for and against 3. Total number of points for 4. Aggregate number of points scored in matches between tied teams 5. Number of matches won excluding the first match, then the second and so on until the tie is settled
Green background are promotion places. There is no relegation. Updated: 24 April 2016

== 2015–16 ==
The first matches of the 2015–16 Cornwall League 2 were played on 10 October 2015 and the final matches on 2 April 2016 with the six teams playing each of the other teams twice to make ten matches each.

=== Participating clubs and locations ===
Locations of the 2015–16 Cornwall 2 teams

| Team | Ground | Town/Village | Previous season |
|---|---|---|---|
| Camelford RFC | Parc Tremain, Tintagel | Camelford | 3rd |
| Lankelly-Fowey RFC | Lankelly Farm | Fowey | 6th |
| Redruth Albany | Trewirgie Road | Redruth | 5th |
| Roseland | | Philleigh | relegated from Cornwall 1 |
| St Just | Tregeseal | St Just | 4th |
| Stithians | Playing Field | Stithians | relegated from Cornwall 1 |

=== League table ===
2015–16 Cornwall League 2 Table
| Pos | Team | P | W | D | L | F | A | Diff | Try bonus | Loss bonus | Pts | Notes |
|---|---|---|---|---|---|---|---|---|---|---|---|---|
| 1 | Roseland | 10 | 10 | 0 | 0 | 309 | 43 | 266 | 7 | 0 | 47 |
| 2 | St Just | 10 | 8 | 0 | 2 | 249 | 68 | 181 | 5 | 2 | 40 |
| 3 | Camelford | 10 | 4 | 1 | 5 | 167 | 127 | 40 | 2 | 4 | 24 |
| 4 | Stithians | 10 | 5 | 0 | 5 | 135 | 187 | −52 | 3 | 0 | 23 |
| 5 | Lankelly-Fowey | 10 | 2 | 1 | 7 | 123 | 272 | −149 | 1 | 0 | 11 |
| 6 | Redruth Albany | 10 | 0 | 0 | 10 | 46 | 332 | −286 | 0 | 1 | 1 |
Points are awarded as follows: 4 points for a win; 2 points for a draw; 0 points for a loss; 1 point for scoring four tries; 1 point for losing by seven points or less; If teams are level at any stage, tiebreakers are applied in the following order: 1. Number of matches won 2. Difference between points for and against 3. Total number of points for 4. Aggregate number of points scored in matches between tied teams 5. Number of matches won excluding the first match, then the second and so on until the tie is settled
Green background are promotion places. There is no relegation. Updated: 24 April 2016

== 2014–15 ==
The 2014–15 Cornwall League 2 originally consisted of seven teams; each team playing the others twice, home and away. St Day withdrew before the season started reducing the league to six teams. The season started on 4 October 2014 and finished on 24 January 2015 with the champions, St Agnes promoted to Cornwall 1. Lanner, in their first season in league rugby was also promoted after finishing the league season in second place. Both promoted teams finished the league season unbeaten winning eight of their ten matches.

=== Participating clubs and locations ===
| Team | Ground | Town/Village | Previous season |
|---|---|---|---|
| Camelford RFC | Parc Tremain, Tintagel | Camelford | 3rd |
| Lankelly-Fowey RFC | Lankelly Farm | Fowey | 5th |
| Lanner | Trevarth | Lanner | First season |
| Redruth Albany | Trewirgie Road | Redruth | 6th |
| St Agnes | Enys Parc | St Agnes | Relegated from Cornwall 1 |
| St Just | Tregeseal | St Just | 2nd |

=== League table ===
2014–15 Cornwall League 2 Table
| Pos | Team | P | W | D | L | F | A | Diff | Try bonus | Loss bonus | Pts | Notes |
|---|---|---|---|---|---|---|---|---|---|---|---|---|
| 1 | St Agnes | 10 | 8 | 2 | 0 | 522 | 75 | 447 | 7 | 0 | 44 |
| 2 | Lanner | 10 | 8 | 2 | 0 | 433 | 62 | 371 | 7 | 0 | 44 |
| 3 | Camelford | 10 | 5 | 0 | 5 | 86 | 228 | −142 | 2 | 0 | 24 |
| 4 | St Just | 10 | 4 | 0 | 6 | 112 | 300 | −188 | 2 | 1 | 15 |
| 5 | Redruth Albany | 10 | 2 | 0 | 8 | 96 | 407 | −311 | 0 | 1 | 9 |
| 6 | Lankelly-Fowey | 10 | 1 | 0 | 9 | 96 | 273 | −177 | 1 | 1 | −9 | 15 points deducted |
Points are awarded as follows: 4 points for a win; 2 points for a draw; 0 points for a loss; 1 point for scoring four tries; 1 point for losing by seven points or less; If teams are level at any stage, tiebreakers are applied in the following order: 1. Number of matches won 2. Difference between points for and against 3. Total number of points for 4. Aggregate number of points scored in matches between tied teams 5. Number of matches won excluding the first match, then the second and so on until the tie is settled
Green background are promotion places. There is no relegation. Updated: 17 August 2015

== 2013–14 ==
The 2013–14 Cornwall League 2 kicked off on 28 September 2013 and was due to finish on 18 January 2014 with each team playing each of the other teams three times. Owing to fixture cancellations the competition finished on 8 February 2014. The champions, Illogan Park are promoted to Cornwall 1, there is no relegation.

=== Participating clubs and locations ===
| Team | Ground | Town/Village | Previous season |
|---|---|---|---|
| Camelford RFC | Parc Tremain, Tintagel | Camelford | |
| Illogan Park RFC | Paynters Lane Playing Field | Illogan | |
| Lankelly-Fowey RFC | Lankelly Farm | Fowey | |
| Redruth Albany | Trewirgie Road | Redruth | |
| St Day RFC | Playing Field, Telegraph Hill | St Day | |
| St Just | Tregeseal | St Just | Relegated from Cornwall 1 |

=== League table ===
2013–14 Cornwall League 2 Table
| Pos | Team | P | W | D | L | F | A | Diff | Try bonus | Loss bonus | Pts | Notes |
|---|---|---|---|---|---|---|---|---|---|---|---|---|
| 1 | Illogan Park | 15 | 15 | 0 | 0 | 763 | 135 | 628 | 13 | 0 | 73 |
| 2 | St Just | 14 | 9 | 0 | 5 | 255 | 189 | 66 | 6 | 3 | 47 |
| 3 | Camelford | 15 | 7 | 0 | 8 | 239 | 335 | −96 | 5 | 0 | 34 |
| 4 | St Day | 14 | 6 | 0 | 8 | 215 | 346 | −131 | 5 | 2 | 21 | 10 pts deducted |
| 5 | Lankelly-Fowey | 15 | 4 | 0 | 11 | 255 | 414 | −159 | 6 | 2 | 19 | 5 pts deducted |
| 6 | Redruth Albany | 15 | 3 | 0 | 12 | 179 | 487 | −308 | 4 | 3 | 15 | 5 pts deducted |
Points are awarded as follows: 4 points for a win; 2 points for a draw; 0 points for a loss; 1 point for scoring four tries; 1 point for losing by seven points or less; If teams are level at any stage, tiebreakers are applied in the following order: 1. Number of matches won 2. Difference between points for and against 3. Total number of points for 4. Aggregate number of points scored in matches between tied teams 5. Number of matches won excluding the first match, then the second and so on until the tie is settled
Green background are promotion places. There is no relegation Updated: 27 August 2014

== 2012–13 ==
=== Participating clubs and locations ===
| Team | Ground | Town/Village |
|---|---|---|
| Bodmin RFC | Clifden Park | Bodmin |
| Camborne School of Mines RFC | Memorial Park, Kernick Road | Penryn |
| Camelford RFC | Parc Tremain, Tintagel | Camelford |
| Illogan Park RFC | Paynters Lane Playing Field | Illogan |
| Lankelly-Fowey RFC | Lankelly Farm | Fowey |
| Redruth Albany | Trewirgie Road | Redruth |
| St Day RFC | Playing Field, Telegraph Hill | St Day |

== Original teams ==
When league rugby began in 1987 this division contained the following teams:

- Lankelly-Fowey
- RAF St Mawgan (Note: Forces side representing RAF St Mawgan. No longer playing competitive league rugby.)
- Redruth CGSOB (Note: Old boys side from Redruth Grammar School. No longer playing competitive league rugby.)
- Roseland
- Veor

== Cornwall League 2 honours ==
=== Cornwall League 2 (1987–1993) ===
The original Cornwall 2 (sponsored by Courage) was a tier 10 league with promotion to Cornwall 1; there was no relegation.

Cornwall League 2
| Season | No of teams | Champions | Runners-up | Relegated team(s) | Ref |
| 1987–88 | 5 | Veor | Lankelly-Fowey | No relegation | |
| 1988–89 | 6 | Stithians | St Just | No relegation | |
| 1989–90 | 6 | St Agnes | Roseland | No relegation | |
| 1990–91 | 7 | Helston | Redruth Albany | No relegation | |
| 1991–92 | 6 | St Just | Camborne School of Mines | No relegation | |
| 1992–93 | 6 | Helston | Wadebridge Camels | No relegation | |
Green backgrounds are promotion places.

=== Cornwall League 2 (1993–1996) ===
The creation of National 5 South for the 1993–94 season meant that the Cornwall League 2 dropped one tier to tier 11. Promotion was to Cornwall 1 and there was no relegation.

Cornwall League 2
| Season | No of teams | Champions | Runners-up | Relegated team(s) | Ref |
| 1993–94 | 6 | St Agnes | Perranporth | No relegation | |
| 1994–95 | 6 | Redruth Albany | St Day | No relegation | |
| 1995–96 | 6 | Illogan Park | St Just | No relegation | |
Green backgrounds are promotion places.

=== Cornwall League 2 (1996–2009) ===
The cancellation of National 5 South at the end of the 1995–96 season saw Cornwall League 2 return to being a tier 10 division. Promotion continued to Cornwall 1 and there was no relegation. From the 2008–09 season onwards the league sponsor is Tribute. Restructuring at the end of the 2008–09 season saw Cornwall 1 and Cornwall 2 clubs merged into a single Cornwall League.

Cornwall League 2
| Season | No of teams | Champions | Runners-up | Relegated team(s) | Ref |
| 1996–97 | 6 | Bodmin | Wadebridge Camels | No relegation | |
| 1997–98 | 7 | Redruth Albany | Veor | No relegation | |
| 1998–99 | 7 | St Agnes | St Day | No relegation | |
| 1999–00 | 8 | Liskeard-Looe | Redruth Albany | No relegation | |
| 2000–01 | 8 | Mounts Bay | Callington | No relegation | |
| 2001–02 | 8 | St Day | Redruth Albany | No relegation | |
| 2002–03 | 8 | Redruth Albany | Illogan Park | No relegation | |
| 2003–04 | 8 | Helston | Stithians | No relegation | |
| 2004–05 | 8 | St Day | Stithians | No relegation | |
| 2005–06 | 8 | Helston | Camborne School of Mines | No relegation | |
| 2006–07 | 8 | Roseland | St Just | No relegation | |
| 2007–08 | 8 | Illogan Park | Redruth Albany | No relegation | |
| 2008–09 | 6 | Veor | St Day (Note: Five other teams were promoted along with Veor and St Day due to Cornwall 2 and Cornwall League 1 combining into a single division for the 2009-10 season.) | No relegation | |
Green backgrounds are promotion places.

=== Cornwall League 2 (2011–2016) ===
After an absence of several seasons, Cornwall 2 returned due to the splitting of the Cornwall League back into two separate divisions. Remaining at tier 10 of the league system, promotion was once again to Cornwall 1 and there was no relegation

Cornwall League 2
| Season | No of teams | Champions | Runners-up | Relegated team(s) | Ref |
| 2011–12 | 7 | St Agnes | Perranporth | No relegation | (Note: After two seasons there was a return to a two tier system; Cornwall 1 and 2.) |
| 2012–13 | 7 | Bodmin | Camborne School of Mines | No relegation | |
| 2013–14 | 6 | Illogan Park | St Just | No relegation | |
| 2014–15 | 6 | St Agnes | Lanner | No relegation | |
| 2015–16 | 6 | Roseland | St Just | No relegation | |
Green backgrounds are promotion places.

=== Cornwall League 2 (2016–2017) ===
The 2016–17 season saw a restructuring of the Cornwall leagues. For the first half of the season, all clubs from Cornwall 1 and Cornwall 2 played in a single tier 9 division. In the second half of the season the league divided into Cornwall 1 and Cornwall 2 leagues based on the league position of the clubs. During this season there was no promotion or relegation to or from Cornwall 2.

Cornwall League 2
| Season | No of teams | Champions | Runners-up | Relegated team(s) | Ref |
| 2016–17 | 7 | Lankelly-Fowey | Illogan Park | No relegation | |
Green backgrounds are promotion places.

=== Cornwall League 2 (2017–2022) ===
The 2017–18 season saw Cornwall 2 revert to being a tier 10 league. Promotion was to Cornwall 1 and there was no relegation.

Cornwall League 2
| Season | No of teams | Champions | Runners-up | Relegated team(s) | Ref |
| 2017–18 | 7 | Helston | Lankelly-Fowey | No relegation | |
| 2018–19 | 6 | St Agnes | St Just | No relegation | |
| 2019–20 | 6 | Roseland | Helston | No relegation | |
| 2020–21 | Cancelled due to COVID-19 pandemic in the United Kingdom. | | | | |
| 2021–22 | 5 | St Ives | Perranporth | No relegation | |
Green backgrounds are promotion places.

=== Counties 3 Cornwall (2022– ) ===
Following reorganisation of the league structure, Cornwall 2 became a tier nine league and renamed Counties 3 Cornwall. Promotion is to Counties 2 Cornwall and there is no relegation.

Counties 3 Cornwall
| Season | No of teams | Champions | Runners-up | Last place | Ref |
| 2022–23 | 10 | Perranporth | St Just | Redruth Albany | |
| 2023–24 | 12 | Hayle | Wadebridge Camel II | Bude II | |
| 2024–25 | 12 | Launceston II | St Agnes | Camborne School of Mines | |

== Number of league titles ==
- St Agnes (6)
- Helston (5)
- Illogan Park (3)
- Redruth Albany (3)
- Roseland (3)
- Bodmin (2)
- Veor (2)
- Hayle (1)
- Lankelly-Fowey (1)
- Launceston II XV (1)
- Liskeard-Looe (1)
- Mounts Bay (1)
- Perranporth (1)
- St Day (1)
- St Ives (1)
- St Just (1)
- Stithians (1)

== Geography ==
The following clubs have participated in the Cornwall League 2.

| Team | Ground | Town/Village |
|---|---|---|
| Bodmin | Clifden Park | Bodmin |
| Callington | Duchy College Playing Fields | Stoke Climsland |
| Camborne | Memorial Ground | Camborne |
| Camborne School of Mines | Memorial Park, Kernick Road | Penryn |
| Camelford | Parc Tremain, Tintagel | Camelford |
| RNAS Culdrose | Sport Field | RNAS Culdrose |
| Hayle | Memorial Ground | Hayle |
| Helston | King George V Playing Field | Helston |
| Illogan Park | Paynters Lane Playing Field | Illogan |
| Lankelly-Fowey | Lankelly Farm | Fowey |
| Lanner | Trevarth | Lanner |
| Launceston | Polson Bridge | Launceston |
| Liskeard-Looe | Lux Park | Liskeard |
| Mounts Bay | The Mennaye Field | Penzance |
| Ormdale | Treleigh | Redruth |
| Perranporth | Ponsmere Valley | Perranporth |
| Pirate Amateurs | The Mennaye Field | Penzance |
| Redruth II | Recreation Ground | Redruth |
| Redruth Albany | Trewirgie | Redruth |
| Redruth Grammar School Old Boys | Clijah Croft | Redruth |
| Roseland | Philleigh Rugby Field | Philleigh |
| St Agnes | Enys Parc | St Agnes |
| St Day | Playing Field, Telegraph Hill | St Day |
| St Ives | Recreation Ground | St Ives |
| St Just | Tregeseal | St Just |
| RAF St Mawgan | | RAF St Mawgan |
| Stithians | Playing Field | Stithians |
| Veor | Wheal Gerry / Memorial Ground | Camborne |
| Wadebridge Camels | Molesworth Field | Wadebridge |

== Sponsorship ==
The competition is known as Cornwall League 2 and has been sponsored by St Austell Brewery from season 2011–12 through to the current season; Tribute is the name of a beer. For the first ten seasons (1987–88 to 1996–97) the league was sponsored by the Courage Brewery.

== See also ==
- South West Division RFU
- Cornwall RFU
- English rugby union system
- Rugby union in Cornwall
