= Devon League 1 =

English rugby union league

Counties 2 Devon
- Sport: Rugby union
- Instituted: 1987; 39 years ago
- Number of teams: 12
- Country: England
- Most titles: South Molton (4 titles)
- Website: Counties 2 Devon

Counties 2 Devon (formerly Devon League 1) is an English level eight rugby union league for clubs primarily based in Devon (and occasionally includes one Cornish club — St Columba & Torpoint). The champions are promoted to Counties 1 Western West and relegation is to Counties 3 Devon North & East or Counties 3 Devon South & West.

== Format ==
The season runs from September to April and comprises twenty-six rounds of matches, with each club playing each of its rivals, home and away. The results of the matches contribute points to the league as follows:

- 4 points are awarded for a win
- 2 points are awarded for a draw
- 0 points are awarded for a loss, however
- 1 losing (bonus) point is awarded to a team that loses a match by 7 points or fewer
- 1 additional (bonus) point is awarded to a team scoring 4 tries or more in a match.

The top two teams are promoted to Western Counties West and the bottom three teams are relegated to either Cornwall One or Devon One depending on their location.

== 2026–27 ==
Departing were Devonport Services II promoted to Counties 1 Western West while Ivybridge II and Dartmouth were both relegated to Counties 3 Devon South & West.

Team	Ground	Capacity	Town/City	Previous season
Bideford	King George's Field	2,000	Bideford, Devon	2nd
Brixham II	Astley Park		Brixham, Devon	Promoted from Counties 3 Devon South & West
Crediton II	Blagdon		Crediton, Devon	9th
Exmouth II	Imperial Recreation Ground	1,250 (250 stand)		Promoted from Counties 3 Devon North & East
Exeter Saracens	Exhibition Fields, Summer Lane		Whipton, Heavitree, Exeter, Devon	6th
Honiton	Allhallows Playing Field		Honiton, Devon	3rd
Old Plymothian & Mannamedian	King George V Playing Fields		Plymstock, Plymouth	8th
Plymstock Albion Oaks	Horsham Playing Fields		Staddiscombe, Plymouth	Relegated from Counties 1 Western West (12th)
South Molton	Station Road		South Molton, Devon	4th
Tavistock	Sandy Park	500	Tavistock, Devon	10th
Topsham II	Bonfire Field		Topsham, Exeter	5th
Withycombe	Raleigh Park		Exmouth, Devon	7th

Locations of the 2025–26 Counties 2 Devon teams

== 2025–26 ==
Departing were Torquay Athletic promoted to Counties 1 Western West while Exmouth II (10th) were relegated to Counties 3 Devon North & East together with Tamar Saracens (11th) and Plymouth Argaum, both relegated to Counties 3 Devon South & West.

Team	Ground	Capacity	Town/City	Previous season
Bideford	King George's Field	2,000	Bideford, Devon	Relegated from Counties 1 Western West (12th)
Crediton II	Blagdon		Crediton, Devon	Promoted from Counties 3 Devon North & East
Dartmouth	Dartmouth Leisure Centre		Dartmouth	9th
Devonport Services II	The Rectory	2,000	Devonport, Plymouth, Devon	3rd
Exeter Saracens	Exhibition Fields, Summer Lane		Whipton, Heavitree, Exeter, Devon	4th
Honiton	Allhallows Playing Field		Honiton, Devon	2nd
Ivybridge II	Cross-in-Hand		Ivybridge, Devon	Promoted from Counties 3 Devon South & West (champions)
Old Plymothian & Mannamedian	King George V Playing Fields		Plymstock, Plymouth	7th
South Molton	Station Road		South Molton, Devon	8th
Tavistock	Sandy Park	500	Tavistock, Devon	Relegated from Counties 1 Western West (11th)
Topsham II	Bonfire Field		Topsham, Exeter	5th
Withycombe	Raleigh Park		Exmouth, Devon	6th

Locations of the 2025–26 Counties 2 Devon teams

== 2024–25 ==
Departing were Barnstaple II, promoted to Counties 1 Western West. North Tawton (11th) and Ivybridge II (12th) and were relegated to Counties 3 Devon North & East and Counties 3 Devon South & West respectively.

Joining were Topsham 2XV and Dartmouth, promoted from Counties 3 Devon North & East and Counties 3 Devon South & West respectively.

Team	Ground	Capacity	Town/City	Previous season
Dartmouth	Dartmouth Leisure Centre		Dartmouth	Promoted from Counties 3 Devon South & West (champions)
Devonport Services II	The Rectory	2,000	Devonport, Plymouth, Devon	3rd
Exeter Saracens	Exhibition Fields, Summer Lane		Whipton, Heavitree, Exeter, Devon	4th
Exmouth II	Imperial Recreation Ground	1,250 (250 stand)	Exmouth, Devon	7th
Honiton	Allhallows Playing Field		Honiton, Devon	6th
Old Plymothian & Mannamedian	King George V Playing Fields		Plymstock, Plymouth	8th
Plymouth Argaum	Bickleigh Down		Plymouth, Devon	10th
South Molton	Station Road		South Molton, Devon	5th
Tamar Saracens	The Parkway		Ernesettle, Plymouth	Promoted from Counties 3 Devon South & West (runners-up)
Topsham II	Bonfire Field		Topsham, Exeter	Promoted from Counties 3 Devon North & East
Torquay Athletic	Recreation Ground	3,000 (300 seats)	Torquay, Devon	2nd
Withycombe	Raleigh Park		Exmouth, Devon	9th

Locations of the 2024–25 Counties 2 Devon teams

== 2023–24 ==
Departing were Tavistock, promoted to Counties 1 Western West whilst Brixham II were relegated to Counties 3 Devon South & West. Joining were Old Plymothian & Mannamedian and Plymouth Argaum, promoted from Counties 3 Devon East and Counties 3 Devon West respectively.

Team	Ground	Capacity	Town/City	Previous season
Barnstaple II	Pottingham Road	2,000 (575 seats)	Barnstaple, Devon	3rd
Devonport Services II	The Rectory	2,000	Devonport, Plymouth, Devon	9th
Exeter Saracens	Exhibition Fields, Summer Lane		Whipton, Heavitree, Exeter, Devon	6th
Exmouth II	Imperial Recreation Ground	1,250 (250 stand)	Exmouth, Devon	8th
Honiton	Allhallows Playing Field		Honiton, Devon	5th
Ivybridge II	Cross-in-Hand		Ivybridge, Devon	7th
North Tawton	Taw Meadow		North Tawton, Devon	11th
Old Plymothian & Mannamedian	King George V Playing Fields		Plymstock, Plymouth	Promoted from Counties 3 Devon East (champions)
Plymouth Argaum	Bickleigh Down		Plymouth, Devon	Promoted from Counties 3 Devon West (champions)
South Molton	Station Road		South Molton, Devon	10th
Torquay Athletic	Recreation Ground	3,000 (300 seats)	Torquay, Devon	2nd
Withycombe	Raleigh Park		Exmouth, Devon	4th

Locations of the 2023–24 Counties 2 Devon teams

== 2022–23 ==
=== Participating clubs and locatoins ===
This was the first season following the RFU Adult Competition Review (ACR). The league was a continuation of Devon League 1 in name only with just the top two sides included in the new line-up of clubs. It was closer in standard to the Cornwall/Devon League (both being level 8) with four teams who played in that league the previous season included while the Cornish teams were allocated to Counties 2 Cornwall. Post ACR second-team club sides were permitted to enter the RFU pyramid so five 2XVs joined alongside Honiton relegated from Western Counties West.

Team	Ground	Capacity	Town/City	Previous season
Barnstaple II	Pottingham Road	2,000 (575 seats)	Barnstaple, Devon	New entry
Brixham II	Astley Park	1,800 (300 stand)	Brixham, Devon	New entry
Devonport Services II	The Rectory	2,000	Devonport, Plymouth, Devon	New entry
Exeter Saracens	Exhibition Fields, Summer Lane		Whipton, Heavitree, Exeter, Devon	1st (Devon League 1)
Exmouth II	Imperial Recreation Ground	1,250 (250 stand)	Exmouth, Devon	New entry
Honiton	Allhallows Playing Field		Honiton, Devon	14th Western Counties West
Ivybridge II	Cross-in-Hand		Ivybridge, Devon	New entry
North Tawton	Taw Meadow		North Tawton, Devon	10th Cornwall/Devon
South Molton	Station Road		South Molton, Devon	2nd (Devon League 1)
Tavistock	Sandy Park	500	Tavistock, Devon	6th Cornwall/Devon
Torquay Athletic	Recreation Ground	3,000 (300 seats)	Torquay, Devon	8th Cornwall/Devon
Withycombe	Raleigh Park		Exmouth, Devon	11th Cornwall/Devon

Locations of the 2022–23 Counties 2 Devon teams

=== League table ===
2022–23 Counties 2 Devon
		Played	Won	Drawn	Lost	Points for	Points against	Pts diff	Try bonus	Loss bonus	Points	Pts adj
1	Tavistock (P)	22	20	0	2	934	363	571	18	0	98	
2	Torquay Athletic	21	16	0	5	554	367	187	13	3	80	
3	Barnstaple II	22	15	0	7	554	300	244	13	3	76	
4	Withycombe	22	13	0	9	431	422	9	6	5	63	
5	Honiton	22	11	0	11	592	505	87	13	5	63	
6	Exeter Saracens	21	10	0	11	501	521	−20	9	3	52	
7	Ivybridge II	22	9	0	13	512	627	−115	11	3	50	
8	Exmouth II	20	9	0	11	356	588	−232	8	3	48	1
9	Devonport Services II	22	9	0	13	435	625	−190	8	1	45	
10	South Molton	22	9	0	13	494	507	−13	7	6	39	−10
11	North Tawton	22	6	0	16	404	549	−145	6	3	33	
12	Brixham II (R)	22	3	0	19	302	685	−383	3	5	15	−12
If teams are level at any stage, tiebreakers are applied in the following order: 1. Number of matches won 2. Difference between points for and against 3. Total number of points for 4. Aggregate number of points scored in matches between tied teams 5. Number of matches won excluding the first match, then the second and so on until the tie is settled
Green background is the promotion place. Pink background is relegation place. Updated: 17 March 2026

== 2021–22 ==
Team	Ground	Capacity	Town/City	Previous season
Buckfastleigh Ramblers	Buckfastleigh Sports Club		Buckfastleigh	10th
Dartmouth	Dartmouth Leisure Centre		Dartmouth	8th
Exeter Athletic	Bravelands		Clyst St Mary, Devon	Relegated from Cornwall/Devon (12th)
Exeter Saracens	Exhibition Fields, Summer Lane		Whipton, Heavitree, Exeter	4th
Ilfracombe	Brimlands		Ilfracombe	12th
New Cross	Five Lanes Pitch, Strap Lane		Kingsteignton	11th
Old Plymothian & Mannamedian	King George V Playing Fields		Plymstock, Plymouth	3rd
Old Technicians	Weston Mill Oak Villa Social Club		Plymouth	7th
Plymouth Argaum	Bickleigh Down		Plymouth, Devon	9th
Salcombe	Two Meads	500	Salcombe	Joined from Devon Merit League
South Molton	Station Road		South Molton	Relegated from Cornwall/Devon (13th)
Tamar Saracens	The Parkway		Ernesettle, Plymouth	2nd
Torrington	Donnacroft		Great Torrington	6th
Totnes	Borough Park		Totnes	5th

Locations of the 2021–22 Devon 1 teams

== 2020–21 ==
Due to the ongoing pandemic, the 2020–21 season was cancelled.

== 2019–20 ==
Team	Ground	Capacity	Town/City	Previous season
Buckfastleigh Ramblers	Buckfastleigh Sports Club		Buckfastleigh	5th
Dartmouth	Dartmouth Leisure Centre		Dartmouth	10th
Exeter Saracens	Exhibition Fields, Summer Lane		Whipton, Heavitree, Exeter	3rd
Ilfracombe	Brimlands		Ilfracombe	Joined from Devon Merit League
New Cross	Five Lanes Pitch, Strap Lane		Kingsteignton	11th
Old Plymothian & Mannamedian	King George V Playing Fields		Plymstock, Plymouth	9th
Old Technicians	Weston Mill Oak Villa Social Club		Plymouth	6th
Plymouth Argaum	Bickleigh Down		Plymouth, Devon	Relegated from Cornwall/Devon (13th)
Tamar Saracens	The Parkway		Ernesettle, Plymouth	4th
Torrington	Donnacroft		Great Torrington	7th
Totnes	Borough Park		Totnes	8th
Withycombe	Raleigh Park		Exmouth	Relegated from Cornwall/Devon (14th)

Locations of the 2019–20 Devon 1 teams

== 2018–19 ==
Team	Ground	Capacity	Town/City	Previous season
Buckfastleigh Ramblers	Buckfastleigh Sports Club		Buckfastleigh	Promoted from Devon League 2 (runners up)
Dartmouth	Dartmouth Leisure Centre		Dartmouth	3rd
Exeter Athletic (Note: Exeter Athletic were previously called Wessex RFC until that club merged with Exeter Youth RFC at the end of the 2017–18 season.)	Bravelands		Clyst St Mary, Devon	Relegated from Cornwall/Devon (13th)
Exeter Saracens	Exhibition Fields, Summer Lane		Whipton, Heavitree, Exeter	7th (not relegated)
New Cross	Five Lanes Pitch, Strap Lane		Kingsteignton	6th
North Tawton	Taw Meadow		North Tawton	Promoted from Devon League 2 (champions)
Old Plymothian & Mannamedian	King George V Playing Fields		Plymstock, Plymouth	Promoted from Devon League 2 (3rd)
Old Technicians	Weston Mill Oak Villa Social Club		Plymouth	8th (not relegated)
Tamar Saracens	The Parkway		Ernesettle, Plymouth	5th
Torrington	Donnacroft		Great Torrington	Relegated from Cornwall/Devon (14th)
Totnes	Borough Park		Totnes	4th

Locations of the 2018–19 Devon 1 teams

== 2017–18 ==
Team	Ground	Capacity	Town/City	Previous season
Dartmouth	Dartmouth Leisure Centre		Dartmouth	Promoted from Devon 2 (champions)
Exeter Saracens	Exhibition Fields, Summer Lane		Whipton, Exeter	6th
New Cross	Five Lanes Pitch, Strap Lane		Kingsteignton	4th
Old Technicians	Weston Mill Oak Villa Social Club		Plymouth	Promoted from Devon 2 (runner-up)
South Molton	Station Road		South Molton	3rd
Tamar Saracens	The Parkway		Ernesettle, Plymouth	Relegated from Cornwall/Devon (14th)
Topsham	Bonfire Field		Topsham, Exeter	Relegated from Cornwall/Devon (13th)
Totnes	Borough Park		Totnes	5th

Locations of the 2017–18 Devon 1 teams

== 2016–17 ==
=== Participating clubs and locations ===
Team	Ground	Capacity	Town/Village	Previous season
Exeter Saracens	Exhibition Fields, Summer Lane		Whipton, Exeter, Devon	Relegated from Cornwall/Devon (12th)
Ilfracombe	Brimlands		Ilfracombe	Promoted from Devon 2 (champions)
New Cross	Five Lanes Pitch, Strap Lane		Kingsteignton	4th
North Tawton	Taw Meadow		North Tawton	5th
South Molton	Station Road		South Molton	6th
Torrington	Donnacroft		Torrington	Promoted from Devon 2 (runner-up)
Totnes	Borough Park		Totnes	7th
Wessex	Flowerpot Playing Fields		Exeter	3rd

=== League table ===
2016–17 Devon 1 League Table
		Played	Won	Drawn	Lost	Points for	Points against	Difference	Try bonus	Loss bonus	Points
1	Wessex (P)	14	11	2	1	356	199	157	7	1	56
2	Torrington (P)	14	9	0	5	256	214	42	2	3	41
3	South Molton	14	7	1	6	255	230	25	4	4	39
4	New Cross	14	7	1	6	263	229	34	4	2	36
5	Totnes	14	6	0	8	243	256	−13	3	4	31
6	Exeter Saracens	14	6	0	8	295	299	−4	8	3	30
7	North Tawton	14	6	0	8	255	243	12	1	3	28
8	Ilfracombe	14	2	0	12	161	414	−253	2	2	12
If teams are level at any stage, tiebreakers are applied in the following order: 1. Number of matches won 2. Difference between points for and against 3. Total number of points for 4. Aggregate number of points scored in matches between tied teams 5. Number of matches won excluding the first match, then the second and so on until the tie is settled
Green background is the promotion place. Blue background is the play-off place. Pink background are relegation places. Updated: 21 April 2017

=== Promotion play-off ===
Each season, the runners-up of Cornwall 1 and Devon 1, usually participate in a play-off for promotion to Cornwall/Devon. Newquay Hornets declined to play the match and Torrington were promoted.

== 2015–16 ==
=== Participating clubs and locations ===
Locations of the 2015–16 Devon 1

Team	Ground	Capacity	Town/Village	Previous season
New Cross	Abbrook Park		Kingsteignton	6th
North Tawton	Taw Meadow		North Tawton	Promoted from Devon 2 (champions)
Old Plymothian & Mannamedian	King George V Playing Fields		Plymstock, Plymouth	Relegated from Cornwall/Devon (12th)
South Molton	Station Road		South Molton	Relegated from Cornwall/Devon (13th)
St Columba & Torpoint	Defiance Field		Torpoint, Cornwall	3rd
Tamar Saracens	The Parkway		Ernesettle, Plymouth	Promoted from Devon 2 (runner-up)
Topsham	Bonfire Field		Topsham, Exeter	7th
Totnes	Borough Park		Totnes	4th
Wessex	Flowerpot Playing Fields		Exeter	5th

=== League table ===
2015–16 Devon 1 League Table
		Played	Won	Drawn	Lost	Points for	Points against	Difference	Try bonus	Loss bonus	Points
1	Tamar Saracens (P)	16	12	2	2	433	134	299	7	1	60
2	Topsham (P)	16	11	0	5	386	174	212	8	2	54
3	Wessex	16	12	0	4	289	204	85	3	1	52
4	New Cross	16	9	1	6	432	254	178	4	3	45
5	North Tawton	16	9	0	7	291	272	19	3	1	40
6	South Molton	16	7	0	9	330	254	76	5	4	37
7	Totnes	16	6	1	9	307	261	46	3	2	31
8	Old Plymothian & Mannamedian	16	4	0	12	185	372	−187	2	4	22
9	St Columba &Torpoint	16	0	0	16	125	853	−728	1	1	2
If teams are level at any stage, tiebreakers are applied in the following order: 1. Number of matches won 2. Difference between points for and against 3. Total number of points for 4. Aggregate number of points scored in matches between tied teams 5. Number of matches won excluding the first match, then the second and so on until the tie is settled
Green background is the promotion place. Blue background is the play-off place. Pink background are relegation places. Updated: 21 April 2017

=== Promotion play-off ===
Each season, the runners-up of Cornwall 1 and Devon 1, usually participate in a play-off for promotion to Cornwall/Devon. Camborne School of Mines were due to play Topsham, but it appears that Camborne School of Mines conceded.

== 2014–15 ==
Plymouth Argaum are the champions and they are promoted to Cornwall/Devon for season 2015–16. The runner-up, Plymstock Albion Oaks won the play-off match against Veor 47 – 3 to also win promotion. The last two teams Old Technicians (8th) and Torrington (9th) are relegated (subject to confirmation) to Devon 2.

=== Participating clubs and locations ===
Team	Ground	Capacity	Town/Village	Previous season
New Cross	Abbrook Park		Kingsteignton	7th
Old Technicians	Weston Mill Oak Villa Social Club		Plymouth	5th
Plymouth Argaum	Bickleigh Down		Plymouth	Promoted from Devon 2
Plymstock Albion Oaks	Horsham Playing Fields		Staddiscombe, Plymouth	6th
St Columba & Torpoint	Defiance Field		Torpoint, Cornwall	8th
Topsham	Bonfire Field		Topsham, Exeter	3rd
Torrington	Donnacroft		Torrington	Promoted from Devon 2
Totnes	Borough Park		Totnes	2nd
Wessex	Flowerpot Playing Fields		Exeter	4th

=== League table ===
2014–15 Devon 1 League Table
	Club	Played	Won	Drawn	Lost	Points for	Points against	Difference	Try bonus	Loss bonus	Points
1	Plymouth Argaum (P)	16	14	0	2	522	160	362	9	1	66
2	Plymstock Albion Oaks (P)	16	12	1	3	360	212	148	4	1	55
3	St Columba & Torpoint	16	10	0	6	291	266	25	4	1	45
4	Totnes	16	7	0	9	322	291	31	2	5	35
5	Wessex	16	8	0	8	256	321	−65	2	0	34
6	New Cross	16	7	0	9	254	309	−55	3	2	34
7	Topsham	16	6	0	10	284	324	−40	3	4	31
8	Old Technicians	16	5	0	11	228	280	−52	3	6	29
9	Torrington	16	2	1	13	168	522	−354	1	2	13
If teams are level at any stage, tiebreakers are applied in the following order: 1. Number of matches won 2. Difference between points for and against 3. Total number of points for 4. Aggregate number of points scored in matches between tied teams 5. Number of matches won excluding the first match, then the second and so on until the tie is settled
Green background is the promotion place. Blue background is the play-off place. Pink background are relegation places. Updated: 28 April 2015

=== Promotion play-off ===
Each season, the runners-up of Cornwall 1 and Devon 1, participate in a play-off for promotion to Cornwall/Devon. Plymouth Albion Oaks beat the home team Veor 47 – 3.

Club	Played	Won	Drawn	Lost	Points for	Points against	Points difference	Try bonus	Loss bonus	Points
Plymstock Albion Oaks (P)	16	12	1	3	360	212	148	4	1	55
Veor	14	10	0	4	394	186	208	8	1	50

25 April 2015
14:30

Veor	3–47	Plymouth Albion Oaks

Wheal Gerry

== 2013–14 ==
The 2013–14 Devon 1 consisted of nine clubs; eight from Devon and one from Cornwall. The season started on 7 September 2013 and ended on 5 April 2014 with each team playing each of the other teams twice. South Molton finished in first place and were promoted to Cornwall/Devon, while the runner-up, Totnes, lost to the second team in Cornwall 1, Bodmin, in a play-off and stay in this league. The bottom team, Salcombe, were relegated to Devon 2.

=== Participating clubs and locations ===
Team	Ground	Capacity	Town/Village	Previous season
New Cross	Abbrook Park		Kingsteignton	
Old Technicians	Weston Mill Oak Villa Social Club		Plymouth	Promoted from Devon 2
Plymstock Albion Oaks	Horsham Playing Fields		Staddiscombe, Plymouth	
Salcombe	Two Meads	500	Salcombe	
St Columba & Torpoint	Defiance Field		Torpoint, Cornwall	Promoted from Devon 2
South Molton	Station Road		South Molton	
Topsham	Bonfire Field		Topsham, Exeter	
Totnes	Borough Park		Totnes	
Wessex	Flowerpot Playing Fields		Exeter	Relegated from Cornwall/Devon

=== League table ===
2013–14 Devon 1 League Table
Pos	Team	P	W	D	L	F	A	Diff	Try bonus	Loss bonus	Pts	Notes
1	South Molton (P)	16	13	0	3	390	165	225	10	3	65
2	Totnes	16	10	1	5	311	290	21	4	1	47
3	Topsham	16	9	0	7	304	280	24	5	2	43
4	Wessex	16	8	1	7	296	284	12	2	3	39
5	Old Technicians	16	8	0	8	266	299	−33	2	4	38
6	Plymstock Albion Oaks	16	8	0	8	257	262	−5	3	2	37
7	New Cross	16	6	0	10	231	247	−16	1	5	30
8	St Columba & Torpoint	16	6	0	10	217	309	−92	1	4	29
9	Salcombe	16	3	0	13	194	330	−136	1	3	16
Points are awarded as follows: 4 points for a win; 2 points for a draw; 0 points for a loss; 1 point for scoring four tries; 1 point for losing by seven points or less; If teams are level at any stage, tiebreakers are applied in the following order: 1. Number of matches won 2. Difference between points for and against 3. Total number of points for 4. Aggregate number of points scored in matches between tied teams 5. Number of matches won excluding the first match, then the second and so on until the tie is settled
Green background is the promotion place; pink background is the relegation place.

== 2012–13 ==
=== Participating clubs ===
- Dartmouth
- Exeter University
- New Cross
- Plymstock Albion Oaks
- Salcombe
- South Molton
- Topsham
- Torrington
- Totnes

== Original teams ==
When league rugby began in 1987 this division contained the following teams:

- Exeter Saracens
- Honiton
- Ilfracombe
- Ivybridge
- Kingsbridge
- Old Technicians
- Plymouth Argaum
- Plymouth Civil Service (Note: Plymouth Civil Services has since been disbanded.)
- Prince Rock (Note: Prince Rock would later merge with Woodland Fort to become known as Prince Rock Woodland Fort RFC. The club has since disbanded.)
- South Molton
- Totnes

== Devon League 1 honours ==
=== Devon League 1 (1987–1993) ===
The original Devon 1 (sponsored by Courage) was a tier 9 league with promotion to Cornwall/Devon and relegation to Devon 2.

Devon League 1
Season	No of teams	Champions	Runners-up	Relegated team(s)	Ref
1987–88	11	Exeter Saracens	Plymouth Civil Service	Ilfracombe, Prince Rock	
1988–89	11	Plymouth Civil Service	South Molton	Kingsbridge, Devonport HSOB, Honiton	
1989–90	11	Exmouth	Cullompton	Prince Rock	
1990–91	11	South Molton	Cullompton	Plymouth Argaum, Totnes	
1991–92	11	Devonport Services	Ivybridge	No relegation (Note: The restructuring of Devon 2A and Devon 2B into a single division at the end of the season, meant there was no relegation.)	
1992–93	12	Paignton	Honiton	Plymouth Argaum, Cullompton	
Green backgrounds are promotion places.

=== Devon League 1 (1993–96) ===
The creation of National 5 South for the 1993–94 season meant that Devon 1 became a tier 10 league. Promotion continued to Cornwall/Devon and relegation to Devon 2. The league continued to be sponsored by Courage.

Devon League 1
Season	No of teams	Champions	Runners-up	Relegated team(s)	Ref
1993–94	13	Honiton	Newton Abbot	Jesters	
1994–95	13	Old Plymothian	Newton Abbot	Prince Rock	
1995–96	13	Kingsbridge	Withycombe	Cullompton, Dartmouth, Salcombe, Ilfracombe	
Green backgrounds are promotion places.

=== Devon League 1 (1996–2009) ===
The cancellation of National 5 South at the end of the 1995–96 season saw Devon League 1 return to being a tier 9 division. Promotion continued to Cornwall/Devon and relegation to Devon 2. From the 2008–09 season onward the league sponsor was Tribute.

Devon League 1
Season	No of teams	Champions	Runners-up	Relegated team(s)	Ref
1996–97	10	Withycombe	Newton Abbot	Tamar Saracens, Totnes	
1997–98	10	Newton Abbot	Old Technicians	Dartmouth, Essex Saracens	
1998–99	10	Wessex	Tavistock	Topsham, Old Public Oaks	
1999–00	10	Old Plymothian & Mannamedian	Ilfracombe	Totnes	
2000–01	10	Torrington	Old Technicians	Plymouth Barbarians, Topsham, Exeter Saracens	
2001–02	10	Kingsbridge	Teignmouth	Old Technicians, Old Public Oaks	
2002–03	10	Sidmouth	Old Plymothian & Mannamedian	No relegation	
2003–04	12	Tavistock	Old Plymothian & Mannamedian	Exeter Saracens, Totnes	
2004–05	12	South Molton	Honiton	Topsham, Tamar Saracens	
2005–06	12	Okehampton	Cullompton	Ilfracombe	
2006–07	12	Teignmouth	Bideford	Buckfastleigh Ramblers, Prince Rock Woodland Fort	
2007–08	11	Old Plymothian & Mannamedian	Plymstock Albion Oaks	Dartmouth, Devonport HSOB	
2008–09	12	Teignmouth	Exeter Saracens	St Columba & Torpoint, Plymouth Barbarians, Salcombe	
Green backgrounds are promotion places.

=== Cornwall/Devon League (2009–2018) ===
Despite widespread league restructuring by the RFU, Devon 1 continued as a tier 9 division, with promotion to Cornwall/Devon and relegation to Devon 2. Tribute continued to sponsor the league.

Devon League 1
Season	No of teams	Champions	Runners-up	Relegated team(s)	Ref
2009–10	9	Totnes	Honiton	Buckfastleigh Ramblers, Topsham, Ilfracombe	
2010–11	9	Plymouth Barbarians	Wessex	Tamar Saracens	
2011–12	9	Wessex	Old Plymothian & Mannamedian	North Tawton, St Columba & Torpoint	
2012–13	9	Exeter University	Plymstock Albion Oaks	Dartmouth, Torrington	
2013–14	9	South Molton	Totnes	Salcombe	
2014–15	9	Plymouth Argaum	Plymstock Albion Oaks	Old Technicians, Torrington	
2015–16	9	Tamar Saracens	Topsham	St Columba & Torpoint, Old Plymothian & Mannamedian	
2016–17	8	Wessex	Torrington	Ilfracombe, North Tawton	
2017–18	8	South Molton	Topsham	No relegation (Note: There was no relegation as the division was due to increase from 8 to 10 teams for the following season due to the cancellation of Devon 2.)	
Green backgrounds are promotion places.

=== Devon League 1 (2018–present) ===
From the 2018–19 Devon 1 continued as a tier 9 division, with promotion to Cornwall/Devon. However, the cancellation of Devon 2 meant there was no longer relegation. Tribute continues to sponsor the league

Devon League 1
Season	No of teams	Champions	Runners-up	Relegated team(s)	Ref
2018–19	11	North Tawton	Exeter Athletic	No relegation	
2019–20	12	Withycombe	Tamar Saracens	No relegation	
2020–21	Cancelled due to COVID-19 pandemic in the United Kingdom.				
2021–22	13	Exeter Saracens	South Molton	No relegation	
Green backgrounds are promotion places.

== Promotion play-offs ==
Since the 2000–01 season there has been a play-off between the runners-up of Cornwall League 1 and Devon League 1 for the third and final promotion place to Cornwall/Devon. The team with the superior league record has home advantage in the tie. At the end of the 2019–20 season the Devon League 1 teams have been the most successful with thirteen wins to the Cornwall League 1 teams five; and the home team has won promotion on twelve occasions compared to the away teams six.

Cornwall League 1 v Devon League 1 promotion play-off results
Season	Home team	Score	Away team	Venue	Attendance
2000–01	Wadebridge Camels (C)	53–17	Old Technicians (D)	Molesworth Field, Wadebridge, Cornwall	
2001–02	Mounts Bay (C)	14–17	Teignmouth (D)	Mennaye Field, Penzance, Cornwall	
2002–03	Old Plymothian & Mannamedian (D)	8–20	Mounts Bay (C)	King George V Playing Fields, Plymstock, Plymouth, Devon	
2003–04	Old Plymothian & Mannamedian (D) (Note: The result of the 2003–04 promotion playoff between Old Plymothian & Mannamedian and Perranporth is not listed on the RFU website, although Old Plymothian & Mannamedian would have had home advantage as they had a better league record than Perranporth. We do, however, know that Old Plymothian & Mannamedian won this game as they were in Cornwall/Devon the next season while Perranporth were not.)		Perranporth (C)	King George V Playing Fields, Plymstock, Plymouth, Devon	
2004–05	Honiton (D)	49–20	Saltash (C)	Allhallows Playing Field, Honiton, Devon	
2005–06	Cullompton (D)	28–6	Newquay Hornets (C)	Stafford Park, Cullompton, Devon	
2006–07	Bideford (D)	23–18	Liskeard Looe (C)	King George's Fields, Bideford, Devon	
2007–08	Helston (C)	0–24	Plymstock Albion Oaks (D)	King George V Playing Field, Helston, Cornwall	
2008–09	No promotion play-off. (Note: Due to the restructuring of the English league system by the RFU for the following season there was no promotion play-off. The champions and runners-up from each league having automatic promotion.)				
2009–10	Honiton (D)	43–12	Veor (C)	Allhallows Playing Field, Honiton, Devon	
2010–11	Pirates Amateurs (C)	29–20	Wessex (D)	Mennaye Field, Penzance, Cornwall	400
2011–12	Helston (C)	19–20	Old Plymothian & Mannamedian (D)	King George V Playing Field, Helston, Cornwall	
2012–13	Stithians (C)	17–12	Plymstock Albion Oaks (D)	Church Road, Stithians, Cornwall	
2013–14	Bodmin (C)	17–15	Totnes (D)	Clifden Park, Bodmin, Cornwall	355
2014–15	Veor (C)	3–47	Plymstock Albion Oaks (D)	Wheal Gerry, Camborne, Cornwall	
2015–16	Topsham (D)	HWO (Note: Topsham were automatically promoted as Camborne School of Mines did not want promotion.)	Camborne School of Mines (C)	Bonfire Field, Topsham, Devon	
2016–17	Newquay Hornets (C)	AWO (Note: Torrington were automatically promoted at the end of the 2016–17 season as Newquay Hornets did not want to be promoted.)	Torrington (D)	Newquay Sports Ground, Newquay, Cornwall	
2017–18	Topsham (D)	67–3	Bodmin (C)	Bonfire Field, Topsham, Devon	
2018–19	Exeter Athletic (D)	29–3	Newquay Hornets (C)	Bravelands, Clyst St Mary, Devon	
2019–20	Cancelled due to COVID-19 pandemic in the United Kingdom. Best ranked runner up – Newquay Hornets (C) – promoted instead.				
2020–21	Cancelled due to COVID-19 pandemic in the United Kingdom.				
Green background is the promoted team. C = Cornwall League 1 and D = Devon League 1, HWO and AWO = home team or away team walk-over (when the other team declines to participate).

== Number of league titles ==
- South Molton (4)
- Old Plymothian & Mannamedian (3) (Note: Old Plymothian & Mannamedian's titles includes one win by Old Plymothian prior to the clubs merger.)
- Wessex (3)
- Exeter Saracens (2)
- Teignmouth (2)
- Withycombe (2)
- Devonport Services (1)
- Exeter University (1)
- Exmouth (1)
- Honiton (1)
- Kingsbridge (1)
- Newton Abbot (1)
- North Tawton (1)
- Okehampton (1)
- Paignton (1)
- Plymouth Argaum (1)
- Plymouth Barbarians (1)
- Plymouth Civil Service (1)
- Sidmouth (1)
- Tamar Saracens (1)
- Tavistock (1)
- Torrington (1)
- Totnes (1)

== Tier nine format since 1987 ==
Format of the tier nine Devon 1 rugby union league
Year	Name	No of teams	No of matches
1987–91	Courage Devon 1	11	10
1993–94	Courage Devon 1	13	12
1994–95	Courage Devon 1	11	10
1996–03	Devon 1	10	18
2003–07	Devon 1	12	22
2007–08	Devon 1	11	20
2008–09	Devon 1	12	22
2009–16	Devon 1	9	16
2016–	Devon 1	8	14

== See also ==
- South West Division RFU
- Devon RFU
- Devon 2
- Devon 3
- English rugby union system
- Rugby union in England
