= 2008–09 Cornwall League 2 =

Tribute Cornwall 2
- Countries: England
- Champions: Veor
- Runners-up: St Day
- Matches played: 60

The Cornwall League 2 2008–09 was a full season of rugby union within Cornwall League 2. This was the last time Cornwall League 2 ran until the 2011-12 season, due to restructuring.

== Team changes ==
The number of teams in the Cornwall/Devon League increased from 12 teams to 16 for the following 2009-10 season, therefore the two Cornwall Leagues combined to form a single division of 12 teams, in Cornwall League 1.

== Table ==
Cornwall League 2 2008-09
Pos	Team	Pld	W	D	L	PF	PA	PD	Pts
1	Veor (C)	20	14	1	5	524	272	+252	29
2	St Day	20	11	2	7	300	261	+39	24
3	Redruth Albany	20	9	2	9	351	245	+106	20
4	Camborne School of Mines	20	9	1	10	384	343	+41	19
5	Lankelly-Fowey	20	7	0	13	260	666	−406	12 (Note: 2 points deducted)
6	St Agnes	20	7	0	13	305	337	−32	10 (Note: 2 points deducted)

Rules for classification: Points were awarded as follows: 2 points for a win, 1 point for a draw, 0 points for a loss
(C) Champions

== See also ==
- Trelawney's Army Cornwall rugby website
