= Ernesettle =

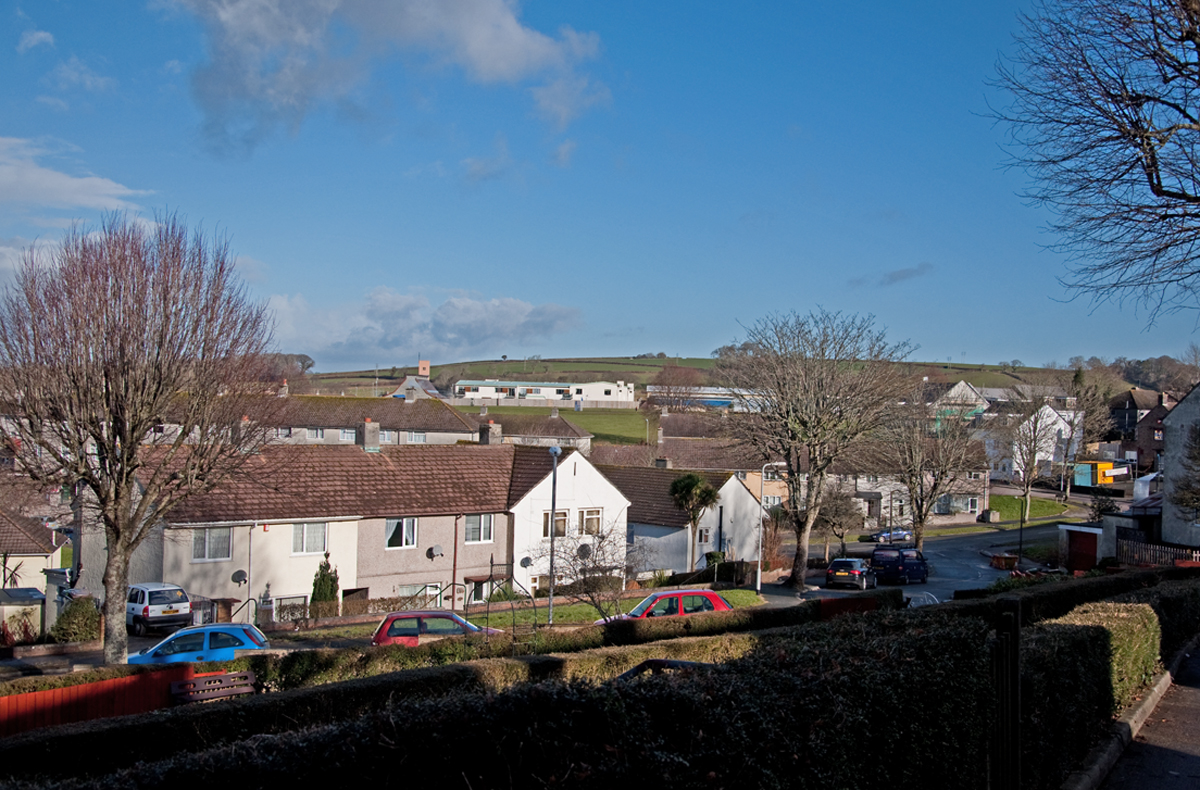
- Croydon Gardens, Ernesettle

- Location within Devon
- Unitary authority: Plymouth
- Ceremonial county: Devon
- Region: South West
- Country: England
- Sovereign state: United Kingdom
- Post town: PLYMOUTH
- Postcode district: PL
- Police: Devon and Cornwall
- Fire: Devon and Somerset
- Ambulance: South Western

Ernesettle is mentioned in the Domesday Book, which documented land in England and Wales, and describes as an ‘old Saxon manor’ there. By the 15th century, there were two farms, Great Ernesettle and Little Ernesettle, both named after William Ernstell, a freeholder of Budshead, who owned land here in 1428. By the 16th century, Ernesettle was a thriving hamlet, and Budshead Mill and a manor house were built on the bank of the river Their date of construction is uncertain, but in 1780 the owner was recorded as Sir Harry Trelawney and the tenant was Mr Robert Nicholls.

It became one of the post-World War II self-contained satellite suburbs built on the north western fringe of the enlarged city of Plymouth, in the county of Devon, England as part of the plan to clear slums and provide new communities for citizens. One of seven new estates constructed as part of Plymouth’s program of reconstruction.

It lies beside the River Tamar about half a mile north of the Tamar Road Bridge and Brunel's Royal Albert Railway Bridge. It is the site of the Royal Naval Armaments Depot and MOD Munitions. There are also industrial companies operating in Ernesettle, such as Vi-Spring. The area is currently having a lot of new buildings put in place, such as new houses, flats and the brand new Ernesettle Community School.

Ernesettle has had many notable residents over the years. Sir Francis Drake lived in the community in the 16th Century, and married at St Budeaux Church, where the records are preserved. Comedian Dawn French spent some of her early childhood here. Her grandfather owned and ran the newsagent's. Former Scotland international footballer and Plymouth Argyle manager Paul Sturrock has also lived in the suburb.

Ernesettle was one of several sites within the wider Plymouth and Devon area, listed for a possible waste incinerator or energy from waste (EfW) facility. Opposition to this grew considerably with the formation of the S.T.I.F.L.E. (Stop the Incinerator Fouling Land at Ernesettle) group which opposed the plan. On 14 March 2010, the plan to build the incinerator in Ernesettle was scrapped. An EfW facility opened in Barne Barton in 2015. In September 2014, Plymouth Biomass Limited submitted plans to build plans to build a biomass energy facility. Following protests from residents, the plans were dropped early in 2015

== Ernesettle Fort ==
The 1859 Royal Commission on the Defence of the United Kingdom recommended a huge programme of new fortifications to defend Plymouth. Ernesettle Fort (shown on Ordnance Survey maps as "Ernesettle Battery") forms part of an arc of forts and batteries which were a defence against an overland attack.

The fort is built 210 feet (64 m) above sea level on a spur below St Budeaux, overlooking the River Tamar. It is trapezoidal in shape and has a dry ditch on three sides, defended by caponiers. It was designed to include a barracks for 60 men in casemates, open emplacements for 15 guns and bomb-proof emplacements for 6 mortars. Construction started in 1863, but the fort wasn't armed until much later; by 1893 it had two 5-inch guns on disappearing mounts, and three 64 pounder muzzle loaders for close defence. The fort was disarmed soon afterwards, but remained in military hands and was in use in World War II. The fort is now within the boundary of the RN Armaments Depot and is not open to the public.
