= Bristol Combination Vase =

Rugby union competition in south-west England

- Sport: Rugby Union
- Instituted: 2003; 23 years ago
- Number of teams: 12
- Country: England
- Holders: Bristol Saracens RFC (1st title) (2018-19)
- Most titles: Old Bristolians (4 titles)
- Website: Bristol & District Rugby Football Combination

The Bristol Combination Vase is an annual rugby union knock-out club competition organised by the Bristol and District Rugby Football Combination – one of the five bodies that make up the Gloucestershire Rugby Football Union. It was first introduced during the 2003–2004 season, with the inaugural winners being Frampton Cotterell. Prior to 2003–04 there had been a plate competition for teams knocked out of the early round of the Bristol Combination Cup, although the vase was not a direct replacement as it was a separate competition intended for lower ranked sides in the Bristol region. It is the second most important competition organised by the Bristol Combination, behind the Bristol Combination Cup but in front of the Bristol Combination Cyril Parsons Bowl.

The Bristol Combination Vase is currently open for clubs sides based in Bristol and the surrounding countryside (including parts of Gloucestershire and Somerset), typically based between tier 7 (Tribute Western Counties North) and tier 8 (Gloucester Premier/Tribute Somerset Premier). The format is a cup knockout with a first round, quarter-finals, semi-finals and a final held at a neutral venue between April–May.

== Winners ==
Bristol Combination Vase Finals
Season	Winner	Score	Runners–up	Venue	Attendance
2003–04	Frampton Cotterell				
2004–05	Bishopston				
2005–06	Gordano				
2006–07	Southmead				
2007–08	Southmead				
2008–09	Old Colstonians				
2009–10	Old Bristolians		Old Colstonians	Station Road, Cribbs Causeway, Bristol	
2010–11	Whitehall	34–10	Chew Valley	Station Road, Cribbs Causeway, Bristol	
2011–12	Old Bristolians	11–9	Southmead	Station Road, Cribbs Causeway, Bristol	682
2012–13	Barton Hill	31–10	Bristol Harlequins	Station Road, Cribbs Causeway, Bristol	
2013–14	Barton Hill		Bristol Saracens	The Hayfields, Mangotsfield, Bristol	
2014–15	Clevedon	32–15	Bristol Saracens	The Hayfields, Mangotsfield, Bristol	
2015–16	Old Bristolians	38–3	Bristol Saracens	Station Road, Cribbs Causeway, Bristol	250
2016–17	Avonmouth Old Boys	38–19	Winscombe	Station Road, Cribbs Causeway, Bristol	
2017–18	Old Bristolians	24-17	Bristol Saracens	Station Road, Cribbs Causeway, Bristol	500
2018-19	Bristol Saracens	41-17	Imperial RFC	Lockleaze Combination Ground, Bristol	550

== Number of wins ==
- Old Bristolians (3)
- Barton Hill (2)
- Southmead (2)
- Avonmouth Old Boys (1)
- Bristol Saracens (1)
- Bishopston (1)
- Clevedon (1)
- Frampton Cotterell (1)
- Gordano (1)
- Old Colstonians (1)
- Whitehall (1)

== See also ==
- Gloucestershire RFU
- Bristol and District Rugby Football Combination
- Bristol Combination Cup
- Bristol Combination Cyril Parsons Bowl
- English rugby union system
- Rugby union in England
