= Bristol and District Rugby Football Combination =

Rugby union organisation in Bristol, England

The Bristol and District Rugby Football Combination is an organisation for the promotion of junior rugby union in the city of Bristol, England.

The Bristol and District Rugby Football Combination is one of two pillars on which the rugby union heritage of Bristol is based - the other being the city's senior rugby club the Bristol Bears. The Bristol Combination, on the other hand, is the body which nurtures junior rugby in the city. From its ranks have come many great players, but also it has provided the framework within which rugby as recreation is developed for thousands of people.

The Bristol Combination was founded in 1901 for "the promotion of rugby union and the mutual well being of clubs", tasks which remain at the core of its mission today. Its members are those 53 rugby clubs of Bristol and its surrounding area, which includes North Somerset and South Gloucestershire. No comparable body of a similar size exists in England.

As well as its representative role, the Combination organises the Charles Saunders Combination Cup, merit tables and leagues for clubs and teams not participating in RFU competitions, as well as an important role in youth and rugby development. It is also responsible for a ground where several clubs play at Lockleaze, in the north of the city.

The Combination regularly organises fixtures of the area's best players against Bristol Rugby Club's first team, or its second team, Bristol United.

== Constituent Clubs ==
- Abbey Wood
- Aretians
- Ashley Down Old Boys
- Avon
- Avonmouth Old Boys
- Barton Hill
- Bishopston
- Blagdon
- Bristol Bears (honorary member)
- Bristol Aeroplance Corporation
- Bristol Barbarians
- Bristol Harlequins
- Bristol Ladies
- Bristol Saracens
- Broad Plain
- Bristol Telephone Area
- Chew Valley
- Chippenham
- Chipping Sodbury
- Cleve
- Clevedon
- Clifton
- Cotham Park
- Dings Crusaders
- Frampton Cotterell
- Gordano
- Hornets
- Imperial
- Keynsham
- Kingswood
- HMP Leyhill
- Midsomer Norton
- Nailsea & Backwell
- North Bristol
- Old Ashtonians
- Old Bristolians
- Old Colstonians
- Old Elizabethans
- Old Redcliffians
- Oldfield Old Boys
- Pilning
- St. Bernadette Old Boys
- St. Brendans Old Boys
- St Mary's Old Boys
- Southmead
- The Tor
- Thornbury
- United Bristol Hospitals
- University of Bristol
- University of the West of England
- Walcot Old Boys
- Wells
- Weston-Super-Mare
- Whitehall
- Winscombe
- Yatton
- Yate RFC

== Competitions ==
The Bristol and District Rugby Football Combination currently runs the following cup competitions for clubs in Bristol and the surrounding area:

- Bristol Combination Cup (club sides at tiers 4-6 of the English rugby union system)
- Bristol Combination Vase (tiers 7–8)
- Bristol Combination Cyril Parsons Bowl (tiers 9–11)

== See also ==
- Gloucestershire RFU
- North Gloucestershire Combination
- English rugby union system
- History of the English rugby union system
