= Counties 2 Gloucestershire =

Level eight rugby union league in England

- Current season or competition: 2024-25 Counties 2 Gloucestershire
- Sport: Rugby union
- Instituted: 1987; 39 years ago (as Gloucestershire/Somerset)
- Number of teams: 12
- Country: England
- Most titles: Drybrook, Spartans (3 titles)
- Website: englandrugby.com

Counties 2 Gloucestershire (or Counties 2 Tribute Gloucester for sponsorship reasons; formerly known as Gloucester Premier) is an English rugby union league which sits at the eighth level of league rugby union in England with teams largely being based in the county of Gloucestershire and Bristol. Originally a single division called Gloucestershire/Somerset, in 2000 the division split into two county leagues called Gloucester Premier and Somerset Premier. Following the Adult Competition Review the league was renamed Counties 2 Gloucestershire and split into North and South divisions. For season 2025-26 the divisions were consolidated once more.

The league champions are promoted to Counties 1 Western North while the runner-up play the runner-up from Somerset Premier for the third promotion place. Relegated teams drop down into Counties 3 Gloucestershire North or Counties 3 Gloucestershire South depending on location.

== Teams 2026-27 ==
Departing were Cinderford II, promoted to Counties 1 Western North while Dursley (11th) and Old Richians (12th) were relegated to Counties 3 Gloucestershire (North).

Cheltenham North (9th in 2025-26) were initially placed in the league but withdrew shortly before the season began.

Team	Ground	Capacity	Town/Village	Previous season
Bream	High Street		Bream, Lydney, Gloucestershire	10th
Bristol Saracens	Bakewell Memorial Ground		Cribbs Causeway, Bristol	Promoted from Counties 3 Gloucestershire (South) (champions)
Chosen Hill Former Pupils	Brookfield Road		Churchdown, Gloucestershire	Relegated from Counties 1 Western North
Frampton Cotterell	The Park		Frampton Cotterell, Gloucestershire	4th
Hucclecote	Charlies Way		Hucclecote, Gloucestershire	Promoted from Counties 3 Gloucestershire (North) (champions)
Old Elizabethans	Severn Road		Hallen, Gloucestershire	5th
Old Patesians	Everest Road		Cheltenham, Gloucestershire	7th
Smiths	Prince of Wales Stadium	3,500 (500 seats)	Cheltenham, Gloucestershire	4th
St Mary's Old Boys	Trench Lane		Almondsbury, Bristol	2nd
Stroud	Fromehall Park	4,000 (200 seats)	Stroud, Gloucestershire	6th
Tewkesbury	The Moats		Tewkesbury, Gloucestershire	8th

Locations of the 2026-27 Counties 2 Gloucestershire teams in Gloucestershire
Locations of the 2026-27 Counties 2 Gloucestershire teams in Bristol area

== Teams 2025–26 ==
For season 2025–26 the North / South divisions were consolidated once more.

Departing were Dings Crusaders II , promoted to Counties 1 Western North as champions of the South division who defeated Smiths (champions of the North division) 28-45 in the promotion play-off.

All other teams, those placed 6th-12th in the North division and 7th-12th in the South division were cascaded down a level in the RFU pyramid to Counties 3 Gloucestershire (North) and Counties 3 Gloucestershire (South) respectively with the exception of Chipping Sodbury (12th South) who dropped two levels to Counties 4 Gloucestershire (South).

Team	Ground	Capacity	Town/Village	Previous season
Bream	High Street		Bream, Lydney, Gloucestershire	4th (South)
Cheltenham North	Stoke Orchard Road		Bishop's Cleeve, Gloucestershire	2nd (North)
Cinderford II	Dockham Road	2,500	Cinderford, Gloucestershire	Relegated from Counties 1 Western North
Dursley	Stragglers Sports Ground		Stinchcombe, Dursley, Gloucestershire	6th (South)
Frampton Cotterell	The Park		Frampton Cotterell, Gloucestershire	2nd (South)
Old Elizabethans	Severn Road		Hallen, Gloucestershire	5th (South)
Old Patesians	Everest Road		Cheltenham, Gloucestershire	4th (North)
Old Richians	Sandyleaze		Gloucester, Gloucestershire	3rd (North)
Smiths	Prince of Wales Stadium	3,500 (500 seats)	Cheltenham, Gloucestershire	1st (North)
St Mary's Old Boys	Trench Lane		Almondsbury, Bristol	3rd (South)
Stroud	Fromehall Park	4,000 (200 seats)	Stroud, Gloucestershire	5th (North)
Tewkesbury	The Moats		Tewkesbury, Gloucestershire	Promoted from Counties 3 Gloucestershire (North) (champions)

Locations of the 2025-26 Counties Gloucestershire teams

== Teams 2024–25 ==
=== North ===
Departing were Gordon League, promoted to Counties 1 Western North. Old Cryptians (11th) were relegated.

Joining were Gloucester Old Boys, Bredon Star and Berry Hill.

Team	Ground	Capacity	Town/Village	Previous season
Berry Hill	Lakers Road		Coleford, Gloucestershire	Level transfer from Counties 2 Gloucestershire (South) (10th)
Bredon Star	Bredon Playing Fields		Bredon, Worcestershire	Promoted from Counties 3 Gloucestershire (North) (runners-up)
Brockworth	Mill Lane		Brockworth, Gloucestershire	10th
Cheltenham North	Stoke Orchard Road		Bishop's Cleeve, Gloucestershire	6th
Cirencester	The Whiteway		Cirencester, Gloucestershire	9th
Coney Hill	Metz Hill		Gloucester, Gloucestershire	8th
Gloucester Old Boys	Horton Road		Gloucester, Gloucestershire	Promoted from Counties 3 Gloucestershire (North) (champions)
Hucclecote	Charlies Way		Hucclecote, Gloucestershire	5th
Old Patesians	Everest Road		Cheltenham, Gloucestershire	2nd
Old Richians	Sandyleaze		Gloucester, Gloucestershire	7th
Smiths	Prince of Wales Stadium	3,500 (500 seats)	Cheltenham, Gloucestershire	3rd
Stroud	Fromehall Park	4,000 (200 seats)	Stroud, Gloucestershire	4th

Locations of the 2024-25 Counties Gloucestershire North teams

=== South ===
Departing were Berry Hill on a level transfer to Counties 2 Gloucestershire (North). Avonmouth Old Boys (11th) and Whitehall (12th) were relegated.

Joining were Lydney II, Chipping Sodbury and Southmead

Team	Ground	Capacity	Town/Village	Previous season
Bream	High Street		Bream, Lydney, Gloucestershire	Champions (not promoted)
Bristol Saracens	Bakewell Memorial Ground		Cribbs Causeway, Bristol	6th
Chipping Sodbury	The Ridings		Chipping Sodbury, Gloucestershire	Relegated from Counties 1 Western North
Dings Crusaders II	Shaftsbury Park	2,250 (250 seats)	Frenchay, Bristol	2nd
Dursley	Stragglers Sports Ground		Stinchcombe, Dursley, Gloucestershire	5th
Frampton Cotterell	The Park		Frampton Cotterell, Gloucestershire	3rd
Lydney II	Regentsholm	1,500	Lydney, Gloucestershire	Promoted from merit leagues
North Bristol	Oaklands		Almondsbury, Bristol	9th
Old Colstonians	Colton's School		Stapleton, Bristol	7th
Old Elizabethans	Severn Road		Hallen, Gloucestershire	4th
Southmead	Greenway Centre		Southmead, Bristol	Promoted from merit leagues
St Mary's Old Boys	Trench Lane		Almondsbury, Bristol	8th

Locations of the 2024-25 Counties Gloucestershire South teams
Locations of the 2024-25 Counties Gloucestershire South teams in Bristol

== Teams 2023–24 ==
=== North ===
Departing were Cheltenham Saracens (12th), Old Centralians II (11th) and Ross-On-Wye (10th), all relegated. Spartans (Gloucester) (8th) did not return for the new season.

Joining were Old Patesians and Stroud, both promoted, together with Cheltenham North, relegated from Counties 1 Western North

Team	Ground	Capacity	Town/Village	Previous season
Brockworth	Mill Lane		Brockworth, Gloucestershire	4th
Cheltenham North	Stoke Orchard Road		Bishop's Cleeve, Gloucestershire	Relegated from Counties 1 Western North (11th)
Cirencester	The Whiteway		Cirencester, Gloucestershire	5th
Coney Hill	Metz Hill		Gloucester, Gloucestershire	3rd
Gordon League	Hempsted Lane		Gloucester, Gloucestershire	Runners-up
Hucclecote	Charlies Way		Hucclecote, Gloucestershire	7th
Old Cryptians	The Memorial Ground		Gloucester, Gloucestershire	6th
Old Patesians	Everest Road		Cheltenham, Gloucestershire	Promoted from Counties 3 Gloucestershire (North) (champions)
Old Richians	Sandyleaze		Gloucester, Gloucestershire	9th
Smiths	Prince of Wales Stadium	3,500 (500 seats)	Cheltenham, Gloucestershire	Champions (not promoted)
Stroud	Fromehall Park	4,000 (200 seats)	Stroud, Gloucestershire	Promoted from Counties 3 Gloucestershire (North) (runners-up)

Locations of the 2023-24 Counties Gloucestershire North teams

=== South ===
Departing were Clifton II, promoted to Counties 1 Western North. Lydney II (11th) and Drybrook II (12th) were relegated.

Joining were Avonmouth Old Boys, relegated from Counties 1 Western North, together with North Bristol and Old Colstonians.

Team	Ground	Capacity	Town/Village	Previous season
Avonmouth Old Boys	Barracks Lane		Shirehampton, Bristol	Relegated from Counties 1 Western North
Berry Hill	Lakers Road		Coleford, Gloucestershire	9th
Bream	High Street		Bream, Lydney, Gloucestershire	4th
Bristol Saracens	Bakewell Memorial Ground		Cribbs Causeway, Bristol	8th
Dings Crusaders II	Shaftsbury Park	2,250 (250 seats)	Frenchay, Bristol	6th
Dursley	Stragglers Sports Ground		Stinchcombe, Dursley, Gloucestershire	3rd
Frampton Cotterell	The Park		Frampton Cotterell, Gloucestershire	7th
North Bristol	Oaklands		Almondsbury, Bristol	Promoted from merit leagues
Old Colstonians	Colton's School		Stapleton, Bristol	Promoted from merit leagues
Old Elizabethans	Severn Road		Hallen, Gloucestershire	Runners-up
St Mary's Old Boys	Trench Lane		Almondsbury, Bristol	5th
Whitehall	Foundry Lane		Whitehall, Bristol	10th

Locations of the 2023-24 Counties Gloucestershire South teams
Locations of the 2023-24 Counties Gloucestershire South teams in Bristol

== Teams 2022–23 ==
This was the first season following the RFU's Adult Competition review and saw the league split into two divisions.

Departing were Longlevens, promoted to Counties 1 Western North.

=== North ===
Joining were Spartans who had withdrawn from Counties 1 Western North in the 2021–22 season.

Team	Ground	Capacity	Town/Village	Previous season
Brockworth	Mill Lane		Brockworth, Gloucestershire	Promoted from Gloucester 1 (North)
Cheltenham Saracens	King George V Playing Field		Cheltenham, Gloucestershire	10th
Cirencester	The Whiteway		Cirencester, Gloucestershire	Promoted from Gloucester 1 (North)
Coney Hill	Metz Hill		Gloucester, Gloucestershire	11th
Gordon League	Hempsted Lane		Gloucester, Gloucestershire	Promoted from Gloucester 1 (North)
Hucclecote	Charlies Way		Hucclecote, Gloucestershire	7th
Old Centralians II	Saintbridge Sports Centre		Gloucester, Gloucestershire	Promoted from Gloucester 1 (North)
Old Cryptians	The Memorial Ground		Gloucester, Gloucestershire	5th
Old Richians	Sandyleaze		Gloucester, Gloucestershire	9th
Ross-on-Wye	Abbotts Close		Ross-on-Wye, Herefordshire	12th
Smiths	Prince of Wales Stadium	3,500 (500 seats)	Cheltenham, Gloucestershire	Promoted from Gloucester 1 (North)
Spartans (Gloucester)	Lansdown Road		Gloucester, Gloucestershire	Relegated from Counties 1 Western North

Locations of the 2022-23 Counties Gloucestershire North teams

=== South ===
Team	Ground	Capacity	Town/Village	Previous season
Berry Hill	Lakers Road		Coleford, Gloucestershire	Promoted from Gloucester 1 (North)
Bream	High Street		Bream, Lydney, Gloucestershire	Promoted from Gloucester 1 (South)
Bristol Saracens	Bakewell Memorial Ground		Cribbs Causeway, Bristol	8th
Clifton II	Station Road	2,500 (400 seats)	Cribbs Causeway, Patchway, Bristol	Runners-up
Dings Crusaders II	Shaftsbury Park	2,250 (250 seats)	Frenchay, Bristol	6th
Drybrook II	Mannings Ground		Drybrook, Gloucestershire	Promoted from Gloucester 1 (North)
Dursley	Stragglers Sports Ground		Stinchcombe, Dursley, Gloucestershire	Promoted from Gloucester 1 (South)
Frampton Cotterell	The Park		Frampton Cotterell, Gloucestershire	3rd
Lydney II	Regentsholm	1,500	Lydney, Gloucestershire	Promoted from Gloucester 1 (South)
Old Elizabethans	Severn Road		Hallen, Gloucestershire	4th
St Mary's Old Boys	Trench Lane		Almondsbury, Bristol	Promoted from Gloucester 1 (South)
Whitehall	Foundry Lane		Whitehall, Bristol	Promoted from Gloucester 1 (South)

Locations of the 2022-23 Counties Gloucestershire South teams

== Teams 2021–22 ==
St Mary's Old Boys and Berry Hill who finished 9th and 10th respectively in 2019–20 but will play in Gloucester 1 in the current season. Their places were taken by Clifton II and Dings Crusaders II.

Team	Ground	Capacity	Town/Village	Previous season
Bristol Saracens	Bakewell Memorial Ground		Cribbs Causeway, Bristol	Relegated from Western Counties North (13th)
Cheltenham Saracens	King George V Playing Field		Cheltenham, Gloucestershire	8th
Clifton II	Station Road	2,500 (400 seats)	Cribbs Causeway, Patchway, Bristol	New entry
Coney Hill	Metz Hill		Gloucester, Gloucestershire	Relegated from Western Counties North (14th)
Dings Crusaders II	Shaftsbury Park	2,250 (250 seats)	Frenchay, Bristol	New entry
Frampton Cotterell	The Park		Frampton Cotterell, Gloucestershire	5th
Hucclecote	Charlies Way		Hucclecote, Gloucestershire	4th
Longlevens	Longford Lane		Longlevens, Gloucestershire	3rd
Old Cryptians	The Memorial Ground		Gloucester, Gloucestershire	Promoted from Gloucester 1 (champions)
Old Elizabethans	Severn Road		Hallen, Gloucestershire	Promoted from Gloucester 1 (runners-up)
Old Richians	Sandyleaze		Gloucester, Gloucestershire	6th
Ross-on-Wye	Abbotts Close		Ross-on-Wye, Herefordshire	7th

Locations of the 2021–22 Gloucester Premier teams

== 2020–21 ==
Due to the COVID-19 pandemic, the 2020–21 season was cancelled.

== Teams 2019–20 ==
Team	Ground	Capacity	Town/Village	Previous season
Berry Hill	Lakers Road		Coleford, Gloucestershire	7th
Cheltenham North	Stoke Orchard Road		Bishop's Cleeve, Gloucestershire	Promoted from Gloucester 1 (runners up)
Cheltenham Saracens	King George V Playing Field		Cheltenham, Gloucestershire	5th
Chosen Hill Former Pupils	Brookfield Road		Churchdown, Gloucestershire	Relegated from Western Counties North (12th)
Frampton Cotterell	The Park		Frampton Cotterell, Gloucestershire	6th
Hucclecote	Charlies Way		Hucclecote, Gloucestershire	3rd
Longlevens	Longford Lane		Longlevens, Gloucestershire	4th
Old Richians	Sandyleaze		Gloucester, Gloucestershire	Relegated from Western Counties North (13th)
Ross-on-Wye	Abbotts Close		Ross-on-Wye, Herefordshire	Promoted from Gloucester 1 (champions)
St Mary's Old Boys	Trench Lane		Almondsbury, Bristol	8th
Whitehall	Foundry Lane		Whitehall, Bristol	9th
Widden Old Boys	The Memorial Ground		Gloucester, Gloucestershire	10th

Locations of the 2019–20 Gloucester Premier teams

== Teams 2018–19 ==
Team	Ground	Capacity	Town/Village	Previous season
Berry Hill	Lakers Road		Coleford, Gloucestershire	Promoted from Gloucester 1 (champions)
Bristol Saracens	Bakewell Memorial Ground		Cribbs Causeway, Bristol	Relegated from Western Counties North (12th)
Cheltenham Saracens	King George V Playing Field		Cheltenham, Gloucestershire	10th
Frampton Cotterell	The Park		Frampton Cotterell, Gloucestershire	6th
Gloucester Old Boys	Horton Road		Gloucester, Gloucestershire	8th
Gordon League	Hempsted Lane		Gloucester, Gloucestershire	4th
Hucclecote	Charlies Way		Hucclecote, Gloucestershire	5th
Longlevens	Longford Lane		Longlevens, Gloucestershire	7th
Spartans	Lansdown Road		Gloucester, Gloucestershire	3rd
St Mary's Old Boys	Trench Lane		Almondsbury, Bristol	11th (not relegated)
Whitehall	Foundry Lane		Whitehall, Bristol	9th
Widden Old Boys	The Memorial Ground		Gloucester, Gloucestershire	Promoted from Gloucester 1 (runners up)

Locations of the 2018-19 Gloucester Premier teams

== Teams 2017–18 ==
Team	Ground	Capacity	Town/Village	Previous season
Barton Hill	Duncombe Road		Speedwell, Bristol	6th
Cheltenham Saracens	King George V Playing Field		Cheltenham, Gloucestershire	5th
Chipping Sodbury	Wickwar Road		Chipping Sodbury, Gloucestershire	4th
Cirencester	The Whiteway		Cirencester, Gloucestershire	Relegated from Western Counties North (12th)
Frampton Cotterell	The Park		Frampton Cotterell, Gloucestershire	9th
Gloucester Old Boys	Horton Road		Gloucester, Gloucestershire	Promoted from Gloucester 1 (runners up)
Gordon League	Hempsted Lane		Gloucester, Gloucestershire	8th
Hucclecote	Charlies Way		Hucclecote, Gloucestershire	3rd
Longlevens	Longford Lane		Longlevens, Gloucestershire	7th
Spartans	Lansdown Road		Gloucester, Gloucestershire	Promoted from Gloucester 1 (champions)
St Mary's Old Boys	Trench Lane		Almondsbury, Bristol	Runners up (lost promotion play-off)
Whitehall	Foundry Lane		Whitehall, Bristol	Relegated from Western Counties North (13th)

Locations of the 2017-18 Gloucester Premier teams

== Teams 2016–17 ==
Team	Ground	Town/Village	Previous season
Barton Hill	Duncombe Road	Speedwell, Bristol	relegated from Western Counties North
Berry Hill	Lakers Road	Coleford, Gloucestershire	3rd
Cheltenham North		Bishops Cleeve, Cheltenham, Gloucestershire	level transfer from Midlands 3 West (South) (8th)
Cheltenham Saracens	King George V Playing Field	Cheltenham, Gloucestershire	4th
Chipping Sodbury	Wickwar Road	Chipping Sodbury, Gloucestershire	5th
Frampton Cotterell	The Park	Frampton Cotterell, Gloucestershire	8th
Gordon League	Hempsted Lane	Gloucester, Gloucestershire	promoted from Gloucester 1 (2nd)
Hucclecote	Charlies Way	Hucclecote, Gloucestershire	9th
Longlevens	Longford Lane	Longlevens, Gloucestershire	10th
North Bristol	Oaklands	Almondsbury, Bristol	6th
Old Richians	Sandyleaze	Gloucester, Gloucestershire	promoted from Gloucester 1 (1st)
St Mary's Old Boys	Trench Lane	Almondsbury, Bristol	7th

== Teams 2015–16 ==
The 2015–16 Gloucester Premier consisted of twelve teams from Gloucestershire and Bristol. The season started on 5 September 2015 and the last match was played on 23 April 2016. Eight of the twelve teams participated in last season's competition.

Locations of the 2015-16 Gloucester Premier teams

Team	Ground	Town/Village	Previous season
Berry Hill	Lakers Road	Coleford, Gloucestershire	5th
Bream	High Street	Bream, Lydney, Gloucestershire	9th
Bristol Saracens	Bakewell Memorial Ground	Patchway, Bristol	relegated from Western Counties North (12th)
Cheltenham Saracens	King George V Playing Field	Cheltenham, Gloucestershire	3rd
Chipping Sodbury	Wickwar Road	Chipping Sodbury, Gloucestershire	promoted from Gloucester 1 (runner-up)
Cirencester	The Whiteway	Cirencester, Gloucestershire	6th
Frampton Cotterell	The Park	Frampton Cotterell, Gloucestershire	8th
Hucclecote	Charlies Way	Hucclecote, Gloucestershire	7th
Longlevens	Longford Lane	Longlevens, Gloucestershire	promoted from Gloucester 1 (champions)
North Bristol	Oaklands	Almondsbury, Bristol	relegated from Western Counties North (13th)
St Mary's Old Boys	Trench Lane	Almondsbury, Bristol	4th
Tewkesbury	The Moats	Tewkesbury, Gloucestershire	10th

=== League table ===
2015–16 Gloucester Premier League Table
		Played	Won	Drawn	Lost	Points for	Points against	Points diff	Try bonus	Loss bonus	Points
1	Bristol Saracens (P)	22	22	0	0	1041	210	931	19	0	107
2	Cirencester (P)	22	17	0	5	669	304	365	14	2	84
3	Berry Hill	22	15	1	6	524	331	193	10	4	76
4	Cheltenham Saracens	22	14	0	8	586	373	213	11	5	72
5	Chipping Sodbury	22	14	0	8	559	369	190	11	2	69
6	North Bristol	22	12	1	9	499	388	111	9	4	63
7	St Mary's Old Boys	22	10	0	12	493	548	−55	8	3	51
8	Frampton Cotterell	22	8	0	14	388	660	−272	8	1	41
9	Hucclecote	22	8	0	14	416	479	−63	6	2	40
10	Longlevens	22	7	0	15	352	566	−214	4	5	37
11	Tewkesbury	22	4	0	18	295	801	−506	1	0	17
12	Bream	22	0	0	22	168	961	−793	1	1	2
If teams are level at any stage, tiebreakers are applied in the following order: 1. Number of matches won 2. Difference between points for and against 3. Total number of points for 4. Aggregate number of points scored in matches between tied teams 5. Number of matches won excluding the first match, then the second and so on until the tie is settled
Green background is the promotion place. Blue background is the play-off place. Pink background are relegation places. Updated: 27 August 2016

== Teams 2014–15 ==
Stroud are champions and along with the runner-up Whitehall (play-off winner) were promoted to Western Counties North. Painswick and Gordon League were relegated to Gloucester 1.

- Berry Hill (relegated from Western Counties North)
- Bream (promoted from Gloucester 1)
- Cheltenham Saracens (promoted from Gloucester 1)
- Cirencester (relegated from Western Counties North)
- Frampton Cotterell
- Gordon League
- Hucclecote
- Painswick
- St. Mary's Old Boys
- Stroud
- Tewkesbury
- Whitehall

== Teams 2013–14 ==
- Bristol Saracens
- Dursley
- Frampton Cotterill
- Gordon League
- Hucclecote (promoted from Gloucester 1)
- Newent (promoted from Gloucester 1)
- Painswick
- Southmead
- Stroud
- St Mary's Old Boys
- Tewkesbury
- Whitehall

== Teams 2012–13 ==
- Bristol Saracens
- Drybrook
- Dursley
- Frampton Cotterell
- Gordon League
- Painswick
- Southmead
- Stroud
- St Mary's Old Boys (SW)
- Tewkesbury
- Whitehall
- Widden Old Boys

== Teams 2011–12 ==
- Bishopston
- Bristol Saracens
- Drybrook
- Frampton Cotterell
- Longlevens
- Old Bristolians
- Old Colstonians
- Old Richians
- Southmead
- St. Mary's Old Boys
- Tewkesbury
- Widden Old Boys

== Teams 2010–11 ==
- Bristol Saracens
- Brockworth
- Frampton Cotterell
- Gloucester Old Boys
- Old Bristolians
- Old Colstonians
- Old Richians
- Ross-on-Wye RFC
- Southmead
- Tewkesbury
- Whitehall RFC
- Widden Old Boys

== Teams 2009–10 ==
- Bristol Saracens
- Cirencester
- Frampton Cotterell
- Gloucester Old Boys
- Hucclecote
- Matson
- Old Colstonians
- Old Richians
- Ross-on-Wye RFC
- Spartans
- Tewkesbury
- Whitehall

== Teams 2008–09 ==
- Bristol Saraces
- Cirencester
- Drybrook
- Frampton Cotterell
- Gloucester Old Boys
- Hucclecote
- Matson
- Old Bristolians
- Old Colstonians
- Old Richians
- Spartans
- Whitehall

== Teams 2007–08 ==
- Aretians
- Cirencester
- Drybrook
- Frampton Cotterell
- Gloucester Old Boys
- Hartpury College
- Hucclecote
- Matson
- North Bristol
- Old Colstonians
- Old Richians
- Whitehall

== Teams 2006–07 ==
- Aretians
- Avonmouth Old Boys
- Cirencester
- Drybrook
- Frampton Cotterell
- Longlevens
- Matson
- Old Colstonians
- Old Richians
- Painswick
- Widden Old Boys
- Whitehall

== Teams 2005–06 ==
- Aretians
- Barton Hill
- Chosen Hill Former Pupils
- Drybrook
- Longlevens
- Matson
- Old Colstonians
- Old Richians
- Painswick
- Widden Old Boys

== Teams 2004–05 ==
- Aretians
- Avonmouth Old Boys
- Barton Hill
- Chosen Hill Former Pupils
- Longlevens
- North Bristol
- Old Richians
- Painswick
- Southmead
- Tewkesbury

== Teams 2003–04 ==
- Aretians
- Avonmouth Old Boys
- Cheltenham North
- Chipping Sodbury
- Cirencester
- Chosen Hill Former Pupils
- Longlevens
- North Bristol
- Old Bristolians
- Painswick

== Teams 2002–03 ==
- Aretians
- Avonmouth Old Boys
- Barton Hill
- Cirencester
- Chosen Hill Former Pupils
- Drybrook
- Hucclecote
- Longlevens
- North Bristol
- Painswick

== Teams 2001–02 ==
- Avonmouth Old Boys
- Barton Hill
- Bristol Saracens
- Cirencester
- Chipping Sodbury
- Chosen Hill Former Pupils
- Drybrook
- Hucclecote
- Longlevens
- Spartans

== Original teams ==
When league rugby began in 1987 this division (known as Gloucestershire/Somerset) contained the following teams from Bristol, Gloucestershire and Somerset:

- Avonmouth Old Boys
- Cleve
- Combe Down
- Coney Hill
- Gordano
- Keynsham
- Midsomer Norton
- Minehead Barbarians
- St. Brendan's Old Boys
- Tredworth
- Whitehall

== Gloucester Premier honours ==
=== Gloucestershire/Somerset (1987–1993) ===
Originally Gloucester Premier and Somerset Premier were combined in a single division known as Gloucestershire/Somerset, involving teams based in Gloucestershire, Somerset and Bristol. It was tier 8 league with promotion to Western Counties (Note: Since 1996 Western Counties has been split into two regional divisions; Western Counties North and Western Counties West.) and relegation to either Gloucestershire 1 (Note: Gloucestershire 1 was shortened to Gloucester 1 from the 1991–92 season onward.) or Somerset 1.

Gloucestershire/Somerset
Season	No of teams	Champions	Runners–up	Relegated team(s)	Ref
1987–88	11	Avonmouth Old Boys	Combe Down	St Brendan's Old Boys, Tredworth	
1988–89	11	Old Culverhaysians	Combe Down	Minehead Barbarians	
1989–90	10 (Note: Avon & Somerset Constabulary withdrew from league.)	Combe Down	Midsomer Norton	Old Redcliffians	
1990–91	11	Spartans	Whitehall	Midsomer Norton	
1991–92	11	Gloucester Old Boys	Drybrook (Note: 3rd place Wiveliscombe also promoted. The reason for so many promotions was due to the majority of south-west league increasing from 11 to 13 teams for the following season.)	Cleve	
1992–93	13	Old Patesians	Keynsham	Old Sulians	
Green backgrounds are promotion places.

=== Gloucestershire/Somerset (1993–1996) ===
The creation of National League 5 South for the 1993–94 season meant that Gloucestershire/Somerset dropped to become a tier 9 league. Promotion continued to Western Counties and relegation to either Gloucester 1 or Somerset 1.

Gloucestershire/Somerset
Season	No of teams	Champions	Runners–up	Relegated team(s)	Ref
1993–94	13	Dings Crusaders	St. Mary's Old Boys	Coney Hill, Frome	
1994–95	13	Keynsham	Whitehall	Midsomer Norton, Wiveliscombe	
1995–96	13	St. Mary's Old Boys	Cleve (Note: The cancellation of National League 5 South at the end of the 1995–96 would lead to widespread restructuring of the leagues. As a result all 13 clubs in Gloucestershire/Somerset would be promoted; St. Mary's Old Boys, Cleve, Hornets, Oldfield Old Boys, Thornbury, Avonmouth Old Boys, North Bristol, Whitehall, Bristol Harlequins, Cirencester and Old Redcliffians would go up into Western Counties North; Wellington would go up into Western Counties West; Stow-on-the-Wold would go up into Southern Counties North.)	No relegation	
Green backgrounds are promotion places.

=== Gloucestershire/Somerset (1996–2000) ===
The cancellation of National League 5 South at the end of the 1995–96 season meant that Gloucestershire/Somerset reverted to being a tier 8 league. Further restructuring meant that promotion was now to Western Counties North (Note: Western Counties was split into Western Counties North and Western Counties West as part of RFU restructuring at the end of the 1995–96 season.), while relegation continued to either Gloucester 1 or Somerset 1.

Gloucestershire/Somerset
Season	No of teams	Champions	Runners–up	Relegated team(s)	Ref
1996–97	16	Coney Hill	Old Richians	Old Cryptians	
1997–98	17	St. Bernadette's Old Boys	Wiveliscombe	Bristol Saracens	
1998–99	17	Barton Hill	Chew Valley	Old Sulians	
1999–00	17	Old Centralians (Note: Despite finishing as champions, the cancellation of Gloucestershire/Somerset meant that Old Centralians were instead transferred into the new look Gloucester Premier.)	Yatton (Note: The cancellation of Gloucestershire/Somerset and creation meant that almost all teams were transferred into new leagues; Old Centralians, Bream, Chipping Sodbury, Avonmouth Old Boys, Bristol Saracens, Brockworth and Longlevens went into Gloucester Premier, while Yatton, Tor, Old Culverhaysians, Midsomer Norton, Walcot, Avon, Combe Down and Gordano went into Somerset Premier.)	Chard, Frampton Cotterell	
Green backgrounds are promotion places.

=== Gloucester Premier (2000–2009) ===
Gloucestershire/Somerset was reorganised into two county leagues at the end of the 1999–00 season, Gloucester Premier and Somerset Premier, with both leagues remaining at level 8. Promotion from Gloucester Premier was to Western Counties North and relegation to Gloucester 1. Between 2007–2009 Gloucester Premier was sponsored by High Bridge Jewellers.

Gloucester Premier
Season	No of teams	Champions	Runners–up	Relegated team(s)	Ref
2000–01	10	Thornbury	Old Centralians	Brockworth, Bream, Aretians	
2001–02	10	Spartans	Drybrook	Chipping Sodbury, Bristol Saracens	
2002-03	10	Drybrook	Barton Hill	Hucclecote	
2003–04	10	Cheltenham North	Chosen Hill Former Pupils	Cirencester, Old Bristolians, Chipping Sodbury	
2004–05	10	North Bristol	Avonmouth Old Boys	Southmead, Tewkesbury	
2005–06	10	Chosen Hill Former Pupils	Barton Hill	No relegation (Note: There was no relegation as the division would be expanded from 10 to 12 teams for the next season.)	
2006–07	12	Avonmouth Old Boys	Widden Old Boys	Longlevens, Painswick	
2007–08	12	Hartpury College	North Bristol	Aretians	
2008–09	12	Drybrook	Southmead	No relegation	
Green backgrounds are promotion places.

=== Gloucester Premier (2009–present) ===
Despite widespread restructuring by the RFU at the end of the 2008–09 season, Gloucester Premier remained a tier 8 league, with promotion continuing to Western Counties North and relegation to Gloucester 1. From the 2017–18 season onward Gloucester Premier has been sponsored by Wadworth 6x.

Gloucester Premier
Season	No of teams	Champions	Runners–up	Relegated team(s)	Ref
2009–10	12	Matson	Cirencester	Hucclecote, Spartans	
2010–11	12	Whitehall	Old Richians	Gloucester Old Boys, Brockworth, Ross-on-Wye	
2011–12	12	Old Bristolians	Drybrook	Longlevens, Bishopston, Old Colstonians	
2012–13	12	Drybrook	Frampton Cotterell	Widden Old Boys	
2013–14	12	Newent	Bristol Saracens	Southmead, Dursley	
2014–15	12	Stroud	Whitehall	Painswick, Gordon League	
2015–16	12	Bristol Saracens	Cirencester	Bream, Tewkesbury	
2016–17	12	Old Richians	St Mary's Old Boys	North Bristol, Berry Hill, Cheltenham North	
2017–18	12	Chipping Sodbury	Barton Hill	Cirencester	
2018–19	12	Spartans	Bristol Saracens	Gloucester Old Boys, Gordon League	
2019–20	12	Chosen Hill Former Pupils	Cheltenham North	Widden Old Boys, Whitehall	
2020–21	12				
Green backgrounds are promotion places.

== Promotion play-offs ==
Since the 2000–01 season there has been a play-off between the runners-up of the Gloucester Premier and Somerset Premier for the third and final promotion place to Western Counties North. The team with the superior league record has home advantage in the tie. At the end of the 2019–20 season Gloucester Premier teams have been the most successful with thirteen wins to the Somerset Premier teams six; and the home team has won promotion on twelve occasions compared to the away teams seven.

Gloucester Premier v Somerset Premier promotion play-off results
Season	Home team	Score	Away team	Venue	Attendance
2000–01	Gordano (S)	19-21	Old Centralians (G)	Caswell Lane, Portbury, Somerset	
2001–02	Yatton (S)	32-0	Drybrook (G)	The Park, Yatton, Somerset	
2002–03	Barton Hill (G)	36-0	Midsomer Norton (S)	Duncombe Lane, Speedwell, Bristol	
2003–04	Nailsea & Backwell (S) (Note: The result of the 2003-04 playoff between Nailsea & Backwell and Chosen Hill Former Pupils is unknown due to all the south-west promotion playoff games from this season missing from the RFU website. However, as Nailsea & Backwell were in the higher division the next season (and Chosen Hill Former Pupils were not) it is assumed they won the playoff game. Nailsea & Backwell would also have hosted the game as they had a better points record in their league than Chosen Hill Former Pupils did in theirs.)		Chosen Hill Former Pupils (G)	West End Park, Nailsea, Somerset	
2004–05	Tor (S)	25-26	Avonmouth Old Boys (G)	Brian Harbinson Memorial Park, Glastonbury, Somerset	
2005–06	Barton Hill (G)	20-0	Tor (S)	Duncombe Lane, Speedwell, Bristol	
2006–07	Midsomer Norton (S)	10-31	Widden Old Boys (G)	Norton Down Playing Fields, Midsomer Norton, Somerset	
2007–08	North Bristol (G)	29-17	Chew Valley (S)	Oaklands, Almondsbury, Gloucestershire	
2008–09	Southmead (G)	20-14	North Petherton (S)	Greenway Centre, Southmead, Bristol	
2009–10	Cirencester (G)	35-17	Chard (S)	The Whiteway, Cirencester, Gloucestershire	
2010–11	Chard (S)	32-12	Old Richians (G)	Essex Close, Chard, Somerset	
2011–12	Wells (S)	18-10	Drybrook (G)	Charter Way, Wells, Somerset	
2012–13	Midsomer Norton (S)	28-12	Frampton Cotterell (G)	Norton Down Playing Fields, Midsomer Norton, Somerset	
2013–14	Bristol Saracens (G)	19-8	Tor (S)	Bakewell Memorial Ground, Henbury, Bristol	
2014–15	Winscombe (S)	13-21	Whitehall (G)	Winscombe Recreation Ground, Winscombe, Somerset	
2015–16	Winscombe (S)	21-22	Cirencester (G)	Winscombe Recreation Ground, Winscombe, Somerset	
2016–17	Oldfield Old Boys (S)	9-6	St Mary's Old Boys (G)	Shaft Road, Monkton Combe, Somerset	1,000
2017–18	Wiveliscombe (S)	12-15	Barton Hill (G)	Recreational Ground, Wiveliscombe, Somerset	
2018–19	Burnham-on-Sea (S)	24-25	Bristol Saracens (G)	BASC Ground, Burnham-on-Sea, Somerset	
2019–20	Cancelled due to COVID-19 pandemic in the United Kingdom. Best ranked runner up - Cheltenham North (G) - promoted instead.				
2020–21					
Green background is the promoted team. G = Gloucester Premier and S = Somerset Premier

== Number of league titles ==
- Drybrook (3)
- Spartans (3) (Note: One of Spartans titles was when league was known as Gloucestershire/Somerset.)
- Avonmouth Old Boys (2) (Note: One of Avonmouth Old Boys titles was when league was known as Gloucestershire/Somerset.)
- Chosen Hill Former Pupils (2)
- Barton Hill (1) (Note: Barton Hill's title was when league was known as Gloucestershire/Somerset.)
- Bristol Saracens (1)
- Cheltenham North (1)
- Chipping Sodbury (1)
- Combe Down (1) (Note: Combe Down's title was when league was known as Gloucestershire/Somerset.)
- Coney Hill (1) (Note: Coney Hill's title was when league was known as Gloucestershire/Somerset.)
- Dings Crusaders (1) (Note: Dings Crusaders title was when league was known as Gloucestershire/Somerset.)
- Gloucester Old Boys (1) (Note: Gloucester Old Boys title was when league was known as Gloucestershire/Somerset.)
- Hartpury College (1)
- Keynsham (1) (Note: Keynsham's title was when league was known as Gloucestershire/Somerset.)
- Matson (1)
- Newent (1)
- North Bristol (1)
- Old Bristolians (1)
- Old Centralians (1) (Note: Old Centralians title was when league was known as Gloucestershire/Somerset.)
- Old Culverhaysians (1) (Note: Old Culverhaysians title was when league was known as Gloucestershire/Somerset.)
- Old Patesians (1) (Note: Old Patesians title was when league was known as Gloucestershire/Somerset.)
- Old Richians (1)
- St. Bernadette's Old Boys (1) (Note: St. Bernadette's Old Boys title was when league was known as Gloucestershire/Somerset.)
- St. Mary's Old Boys (1) (Note: St. Mary's Old Boys title was when league was known as Gloucestershire/Somerset.)
- Stroud (1)
- Thornbury (1)
- Whitehall (1)

== See also ==
- South West Division RFU
- Gloucestershire RFU
- English rugby union system
- Rugby union in England
