= Simon Hunt (rugby union) =

English rugby union player

- Born: Simon Hunt; 22 July 1981 (age 45) Clapham, London, England
- Height: 1.88 m (6 ft 2 in)
- Weight: 14 st 13 lb (209 lb; 95 kg)
- School: The John Fisher School

Rugby union career
- Position: Wing
- Current team: Old Bristolians
Senior career
Years	Team	Apps	(Points)
1999-00	Rosslyn Park		
2000-02	London Irish	6	(5)
2002-03	Narbonne		
2003	Perpignan	7	(46)
2004	Ebbw Vale		
2004-05	Bristol Shoguns	3	(15)
2004	Pertemps Bees	3	(5)
2005-08	Ebbw Vale		
2006	Newport Gwent Dragons	1	(0)
2008-12	Birmingham & Solihull	85	(494)
2012-14	Moseley	44	(56)
2014-15	Dings Crusaders	26	(70)
- Correct as of 20 December 2015
International career
Years	Team	Apps	(Points)
1999-01	England Students		
2001	England U21		
2001	England Sevens		
2001	Great Britain Sevens		
2006-08	England Sevens		
2009	Barbarians		
2011-12	England Sevens		

Simon Hunt (born 22 July 1981) is an English rugby union footballer and Director of Rugby for Old Bristolians having most recently played for Dings Crusaders. Simon has played club rugby in England, France and Wales and is known as a prolific try scorer who can also point kick. He also has international pedigree, having played at youth level for England as well as being centrally contracted to the England Sevens squad for the 2011–2012 IRB Sevens World Series. Outside of rugby Simon holds 87th fastest time for a 2000m indoor row (Ages 30: 39). He is now working as a PE teacher.

== Early career ==
Simon attended The John Fisher School in Purley, London, which had a very successful rugby union program. From school he played for Rosslyn Park where his father Mick Hunt had involvement in the youth program, combining rugby with his studies and he also represented both London and South of England at U21 level, as well as England Students. His potential was recognized by Premiership side London Irish and he was picked up by the club for the 2000-01 season. As a young up-and-coming player his playing time was limited at Irish where there was a lot of competition for places and he only played 6 games (most of those in the European Challenge Cup), scoring 1 try, in his two seasons at the club.

In the summer of 2002, Simon left London Irish and moved to France where he signed for Top 16 club, Narbonne, for the 2002-03 season. Towards the end of the season he was on the move again, signing for another French club, the high flying Perpignan. His club reached the final of the Heineken Cup that year, losing to Toulouse at Lansdowne Road (a match Simon was not personally involved in). The following season Hunt suffered a serious multi-ligament injury to his left leg.

== Return to England / Welsh club career ==
He returned to England in 2004 and completed his rehabilitation at Sale Sharks before signing for Ebbw Vale playing in the Welsh Premier Division. For the 2004-05 season Simon moved back to England to play for Bristol Shoguns in National Division One scoring 2 tries on his debut against Nottingham. Despite scoring 3 tries in 3 appearances for the club, he was unable to become a regular at Bristol and after a short spell with Pertemps Bees in the same division, he re-signed for Ebbw Vale in 2005. A hat-trick for Vale against Cardiff in September would showcase his quality and he would become a prolific points scorer for club, contributing both tries and point kicking during his second spell there. His form for Ebbw Vale would lead to a call-up by the Newport Gwent Dragons and he made his Celtic League debut against Edinburgh at the tail end of the season.

== Promotion and relegation with Bees ==
Although he was a prolific points scorer in the Welsh Premier Division, Simon was unable to build on his solitary appearance for the Newport Gwent Dragons and in 2008 he moved back to England, signing a full-time contract with Birmingham & Solihull (formerly known as Pertemps Bees) who had just been relegated into National Division Two in what was his second spell with the club (he had made two national league appearances for the club during a brief stint in 2005). In scoring 31 league tries, Simon became the division's top try scorer (teammate Mark Woodrow was the top points scorer) and these tries contributed greatly in helping "The Bees" secure promotion and an instant return to the RFU Championship as they won the 2008–09 National Division Two. His performances in the league lead to Simon being called up by the Barbarians in March, playing and scoring against Blackheath in a 57 - 47 victory at Rectory Field in front of 2,500.

The 2009-10 season was a tough one for Bees as they finished dead bottom of the league at the end of the regular season with just 1 draw from 22 games with Simon managing just 5 tries. However, due to the format of the Championship which split into three groups of four teams during the second part of the season, Birmingham & Solihull had a chance of redemption. They turned the form book on its head by winning 3 of their 6 games in the relegation group, sending Coventry down instead, and Simon finished as top try scorer for this stage of the season, ending with 11 overall. The Bees were less fortunate for the 2010-11 season as they finished bottom of the table for both stages of the season and were relegated despite Simon being the 3rd highest try scorer in the division with 17 tries overall. Following the relegation of Birmingham and Solihull, Simon chose to leave the club due to gaining a central contract with the England Sevens squad for the 2011–2012 season with a view to playing in the 2013 World Cup in Russia.

== Recent career ==
After a short spell with England Sevens in 2012 Simon returned to Birmingham & Solihull who were struggling in the 2011–12 National League 1 signing a two-year contract. He made 7 appearances for the club, scoring 4 tries but was unable to prevent them suffering a second successive relegation as the club dropped to National League 2 North. A player of Simon's quality was meant to play at a higher level and he signed for nearby Moseley for the 2012-13 season. He stayed at Moseley for two seasons before moving to Bristol-based Dings Crusaders as a player coach, rejoining former teammate Mark Woodrow. Simon showed his try scoring quality at Dings with 14 tries but was unable to help the club stay up as they finished bottom of the 2014–15 National League 2 South and were relegated at the end of the season. Despite relegation, Dings did have some success by winning the 2015 Bristol Combination Cup with Simon scoring in the final against Cleve. After leaving Ding's Simon joined Old Bristolians (playing in Tribute Western Counties North) as Director of Rugby for the 2015–16 season.

== International career ==
Hunt's international career got off to a promising start. Whilst studying at St Mary's University he represented England Students and England U21. He made his debut for England Sevens in 2001 and also competed for the first ever Great Britain Sevens team at the 2001 World Games. After a six-year absence, Hunt returned to the national sevens squad between 2006 and 2008, then after a spell of 15's was recalled for the 2010 London Floodlit Sevens. Since then Hunt has reclaimed a regular starting position within the side and played at the 2010 Commonwealth Games in Delhi. He has also represented the Barbarians and made regular appearances on the invitational sevens circuit, in particular for the Samurai International outfit.

== Honours ==
Pertemps Bees/Birmingham & Solihull

- National League 2 champions: 2008-09
- National League 2 top try scorer (31 tries): 2008-09

Dings Crusaders

- Bristol Combination Cup winners: 2015

International/Representative

- Capped for England Schoolboys: 2001
- Capped for England Students: 2001
- Capped for England U21s: 2001
- Represented England Sevens: 2001, 2006–08, 2011
- Represented Great Britain Sevens at World Games: 2001
- Selected for Barbarians: 2009
