= Avonmouth Old Boys RFC =

English rugby union club, based in Shirehampton, England

(England) Avonmouth Old Boys RFC
- Full name: Avonmouth Old Boys Rugby Football Club
- Union: Gloucestershire RFU
- Nickname: The Mouth
- Founded: 1897; 129 years ago
- Location: Shirehampton, Bristol, England
- Ground: Barracks Lane
- Chairman: Grant Britton
- President: Rodney Kennett
- Coach(es): Chris Hurd (Head Coach), Sylvan Edwards (Backs Coach
- Captain(s): George Tomkins & Josh Krupa
- League: Western Counties North
- 2021–22: 12th
Team kit

Official website
- www.pitchero.com/clubs/avonmoutholdboys/

Avonmouth Old Boys Rugby Football Club is an English rugby union team based in Shirehampton in Bristol. The club runs three men senior teams, a vets side, a ladies team, a colts side and a youth section featuring the full range of age-groups including three girls' age groups. The first XV play in Western Counties North, a level-seven league in the English rugby union system.

== History ==
Avonmouth Old Boys RFC is one of the oldest clubs in Bristol and boasts a long and proud sporting history within the local community. Founded in 1897 by local school master W Powell, the club's first ground was on the banks of the River Severn in the region of the present West Wharf 2 of the Royal Edward Dock, there it remained for six seasons. The team then moved to a new home at the King George V Rec Ground (home to Avonmouth FC) where they stayed for many years. The site saw a huge change in the 70s as the Avonmouth Bridge was constructed adjacent to the playing pitches. The club saw a change in location again when in the mid-80s they moved into a brand new facility in Barracks Lane on the King George V playing fields, this is where the club have since stayed.

Avonmouth OBRFC has always been looked upon as one of the leading sides within the Bristol Combination and prior to the current league structure it achieved unparalleled success in the Bristol Evening post merit table and Bristol Combination Cup, mostly during the 1970s and 80s. Following the league restructure in the mid-90s the club struggled to gain any major success in league rugby with hotly contested local derbys taking their toll and many trips to Gloucestershire-based sides putting hold to any success.

The next couple of decades were successful ones for Avonmouth Old Boys RFC. The 1st XV gained promotion through the leagues from Gloucester Premier (level 8) to National League 3 South West (level 5). They won two Bristol Combination Cup titles and were runners-up once. More recently, the club has seen a drop in leagues but won the Gloucestershire County Cup and were runners-up the following year, while also winning the Bristol Combination Cup Vase. Currently the 1st XV competes in the Western Counties North (level 7).

== Honours ==
- Bristol Combination Cup winners (8): 1973, 1984, 1987, 1988, 1990, 1994, 2010, 2012
- Gloucester Premier champions (2): 1987–88 (Note: 1987–88 title was won when league was known as Gloucestershire/Somerset.), 2006–07
- Bristol Combination Plate winners (4): 1992, 1993, 2002, 2016
- Gloucester Premier v Somerset Premier play-off winner: 2004–05
- Western Counties North champions: 2007–08
- South West 1 (east v west) promotion play-off winner: 2011–12
- Bristol Combination Vase winners: 2016–17

== Past players ==
- Barry Nelmes:- England Rugby (6 Caps), Barbarian F.C. (Ba Ba's), Cardiff RFC, Bristol Rugby

Barry attended Portway Secondary School, he represented England Schools (under-15) against Wales at Twickenham in 1963. At the time he was playing in the second row and was equally at home at number 8. His natural mobility and ball handling ability stood him in good stead when he transferred to loose-head prop in senior rugby. At 62 and 17st he was ideally built for the modern game and made rapid progress through the representative ranks. Having made his first-class debut for Bristol rugby as a 16-year-old he was selected two years later for the Western Counties XV that beat the touring Wallabies. In later years he also turned out for the combined team against the All Blacks and Springboks. Nelmes joined Cardiff in 1973-74 and packed down with Alan Phillips and Mike Knill in an outstanding front-row that was the platform for another famous club triumph over the 1975 Wallabies. In the summer of the same year he had flown out to Australia as a replacement and won the first two of his six caps for England. His first home international was in 1978 against Wales. In the same pack was another Cardiff legend, John Scott, then with Rosslyn Park, while the opposition included club mates Gareth Edwards and Gerald Davies. Having been vice-captain for two seasons he succeeded Davies as club captain in 1978/79 and went on to play 166 first team games for Cardiff. He also played for the Barbarians F.C. in two particularly prestigious fixtures - the historic Queen's Silver Jubilee Match against the British & Irish Lions at Twickenham in 1977 and, the following year, as a replacement against the All Blacks at the National Stadium in Cardiff

- Derek Eves:–England Colts, Barbarians FC, Bristol Rugby, Coventry Rugby
- Derek Neate:–RAF, Bristol (captain)

Derek attended Portway Secondary School, Derek was first selected to play for Bristol United in 1952, and later recalled that he actually had to ask what Bristol United was as he had not heard of the team! On Friday 2 January 1953 he received a telegram informing him that he was to make his first team debut the following day against Harlequins at the Memorial Ground as a late replacement for Bert Macdonald. He was still only 17 at the time. After spending the subsequent two seasons moving between the first team and the United, Derek became a first team regular in the 1955–56 season, unusually winning both his first team cap and his club blazer at the season's end. He was called up for National Service in the following season but was often able to play for Bristol owing to sympathetic RAF postings at Locking and Pucklechurch. During his time in uniform he played for both the RAF and Combined Services. In 1961–62, Derek was appointed Bristol captain in succession to the charismatic John Blake. The following season was Bristol's 75th Anniversary, and Derek was again captain. At the end of this landmark campaign Bristol's Annual Report paid tribute to his work for the club both on the field and at numerous social functions. He returned to the captaincy in 1965–66, a conspicuously successful season in which Bristol won the Sunday Telegraph English Merit Table. When he led Bristol out against Clifton at the Memorial Ground on 27 November 1965, he beat his old friend Bert Macdonald's record of 344 first team games. He had one final season as captain in 1966–67, and gradually over the ensuing years he played less and less for the first team. Derek made his final first team appearance against Weston-super-Mare in November 1972, but even after that he turned out in the odd United game when required over the next couple of seasons. He then went on to serve on the club committee and to assist with coaching. Derek made 393 first team appearances, which was at one time the club record, scoring 73 tries and a single drop goal.

- Wayne Hone:- South West of England, England Classicals, Bristol Rugby, Clifton RFC
- Dave Holloway:- England school boy
- Allun Rees:- England school boy
- Nicky Evans:- England N.A.B.C 67/68
- Charl Coetzer:- Army Rugby Union
- Phil Dickinson:- England Colleges
- Andrew Morrison:- England Colleges
- Matt Belbin:- England Colleges, SGS Filton, Thornbury RFC
- Marko Mladenovic:- Cyprus national rugby union team (11 Caps), Falkirk RFC, Musselburgh RFC, Currie RFC
- Harry Hone:- Moseley RFC now Birmingham & Moseley RFC (RFU Championship), Cinderford RFC, Gloucestershire County, Gloucestershire u20's
- Ashley Challenger:- Somerset County, Gloucestershire u20's, Hartpury RFC (RFU Championship)
