= 2009–10 RFU Championship =

23rd edition of the second division of English domestic Rugby

- Countries: England
- Champions: Exeter Chiefs
- Runners-up: Bristol
- Relegated: Coventry
- Attendance: 402,209 (average 2,260 per match) (Note: Note that 2 home attendances are missing (see below) - so the total attendance will not be 100% accurate. The average attendance has also been taken into account with the missing games not included.)
- Highest attendance: 11,550 Bristol at home to Exeter Chiefs on 26 May 2010
- Lowest attendance: 200 Birmingham & Solihull at home to Doncaster Knights on 17 February 2010
- Top point scorer: (Ireland) Gareth Steenson (Exeter Chiefs) 280 points
- Top try scorer: (Scotland) Blair Cowan (Cornish Pirates) (South Africa) Errie Claassens (London Welsh) (England) Matthew Jess (Exeter Chiefs) 14 tries

The 2009–10 RFU Championship was the 1st season (of the professionalised format) of the second division of the English domestic rugby union competitions, played between August 2009 and May 2010. The league had been restructured from the 16 teams of the previous season down to just 12. New teams included Bristol who had been relegated from the Guinness Premiership 2008–09 and Birmingham and Solihull who had been promoted from National Division Two 2008–09. As well as a decrease in teams, the league would now consist of three parts - a standard league section, promotion/relegation pools and then playoffs to determine who would go up as champions.

During this season, Exeter Chiefs won promotion to the Aviva Premiership 2010–11 by beating Bristol in the playoff final. This marked Exeter's first ever promotion to the Premiership, which they would later win in 2017.

Despite finishing 11th of 12 after the first stage Coventry were relegated to the 2010–11 National League 1 as they finished bottom of the relegation pool.

== Participating teams ==
Locations of the 2009–10 RFU Championship teams

Team	Stadium	Capacity	City/Area
Bedford Blues	Goldington Road	5,000 (1,700 seats)	Bedford, Bedfordshire
Birmingham & Solihull	Sharmans Cross (Note: Birmingham & Solihull would play a home game on 2 January 2010 at Goldington Road in Bedford, as well as two more home games at Billesley Common on 2 and 17 February 2010 due to adverse weather conditions effecting the Sharmans Cross pitch.)	3,500 (1,000 seats)	Solihull, West Midlands
Bristol	Memorial Stadium	12,100	Bristol
Cornish Pirates	Recreation Ground	9,000	Camborne, Cornwall
Coventry	Butts Park Arena (Note: Coventry would play a home game on 4 December 2009 at the Ricoh Arena in Coventry.)	4,000	Coventry, West Midlands
Doncaster Knights	Castle Park	3,075	Doncaster, South Yorkshire
Exeter Chiefs	Sandy Park	10,000	Exeter, Devon
London Welsh	Old Deer Park	5,850 (1,000 seats) (Note: Old Deer Park capacity re-evaluated up from 4,500 to 5,850..)	Richmond, London
Moseley	Billesley Common	3,000+	Birmingham, West Midlands
Nottingham	Meadow Lane (Note: Nottingham would play a home game on 7 November 2009 at Welford Road in Leicester due to the Notts County football team playing a home match in the FA Cup on that date.)	19,588	Nottingham, Nottinghamshire
Plymouth Albion	The Brickfields	6,500	Plymouth, Devon
Rotherham Titans	Clifton Lane	2,500	Rotherham, South Yorkshire

== Stage 1 League Table ==
2009–10 RFU Championship table
Pos	Team	Pld	W	D	L	PF	PA	PD	B	Pts	Qualification
1	Bristol	22	19	0	3	630	337	+293	16	92	Promotion playoffs
2	Exeter Chiefs	22	19	0	3	699	360	+339	12	88	Promotion playoffs
3	London Welsh	22	14	1	7	483	376	+107	9	62 (Note: 5 points deducted)	Promotion playoffs
4	Bedford Blues	22	12	1	9	581	436	+145	9	59	Promotion playoffs
5	Nottingham	22	12	0	10	539	520	+19	11	59	Promotion playoffs
6	Cornish Pirates	22	11	1	10	555	463	+92	9	55	Promotion playoffs
7	Doncaster Knights	22	10	0	12	394	386	+8	8	48	Promotion playoffs
8	Plymouth Albion	22	10	1	11	389	462	−73	6	48	Promotion playoffs
9	Moseley	22	10	0	12	444	543	−99	6	46	Relegation playoffs
10	Rotherham Titans	22	7	0	15	451	520	−69	15	43	Relegation playoffs
11	Coventry	22	5	1	16	346	565	−219	5	12 (Note: 15 points deducted)	Relegation playoffs
12	Birmingham & Solihull	22	0	1	21	293	836	−543	4	−9	Relegation playoffs

Updated to match(es) played on 13 March 2010. Source:
Rules for classification: If teams are level at any stage, tiebreakers are applied in the following order:
1. Number of matches won
2. Difference between points for and against
3. Total number of points for
4. Aggregate number of points scored in matches between tied teams
5. Number of matches won excluding the first match, then the second and so on until the tie is settled
  Notes:

== Results ==
=== Round 1 ===
4 September 2009

Coventry	21 - 12	Rotherham Titans
	Report

Butts Park Arena
Attendance: 1,390
Referee: Darren Gamage

5 September 2009

Doncaster Knights	12 - 26	Bedford Blues (BP)
	Report

Castle Park
Attendance: 1,248
Referee: Tim Wigglesworth

5 September 2009

Moseley	25 - 50	Exeter Chiefs (BP)
	Report

Billesley Common
Attendance: 842
Referee: Martin Fox

5 September 2009

(BP) Plymouth Albion	33 - 10	Birmingham & Solihull
	Report

Brickfields
Attendance: 2,176
Referee: Luke Pearce

6 September 2009

Bristol	28 - 23	London Welsh (BP)
	Report

Memorial Stadium
Attendance: 5,025
Referee: Sean Davey

6 September 2009

Nottingham	13 - 24	Cornish Pirates
	Report

Meadow Lane
Attendance: 1,232
Referee: Llyr Apgeraint-Roberts

=== Round 2 ===
12 September 2009

(BP) Bedford Blues	42 - 6	Coventry
	Report

Goldington Road
Attendance: 2,852
Referee: Michael Tutty

12 September 2009

(BP) Birmingham & Solihull	36 - 40	Bristol (BP)
	Report

Sharmans Cross
Attendance: 1,223
Referee: Chris Sharp

12 September 2009

Exeter Chiefs	32 - 20	Doncaster Knights
	Report

Sandy Park
Attendance: 3,573
Referee: Rob Debney

13 September 2009

(BP) Cornish Pirates	57 - 24	Moseley (BP)
	Report

Recreation Ground
Attendance: 2,632
Referee: David Rose

13 September 2009

Nottingham	23 - 16	London Welsh (BP)
	Report

Meadow Lane
Attendance: 1,006
Referee: JP Doyle

13 September 2009

Rotherham Titans	29 - 16	Plymouth Albion
	Report

Clifton Lane
Attendance: 1,125
Referee: Terry Hall

=== Round 3 ===
18 September 2009

Coventry	13 - 27	Exeter Chiefs
	Report

Butts Park Arena
Attendance: 1,500
Referee: Sean Davey

18 September 2009

Doncaster Knights	10 - 21	Cornish Pirates
	Report

Castle Park
Attendance: 1,728
Referee: Andrew Taylorson

19 September 2009

(BP) London Welsh	37 - 12	Birmingham & Solihull
	Report

Old Deer Park
Attendance: 1,650
Referee: Tim Wigglesworth

19 September 2009

Moseley	20 - 31	Nottingham (BP)
	Report

Billesley Common
Attendance: 754
Referee: Adrian Hartwell

19 September 2009

Plymouth Albion	3 - 38	Bedford Blues (BP)
	Report

Brickfields
Attendance: 2,303
Referee: Keith Lewis

20 September 2009

(BP) Bristol	36 - 10	Rotherham Titans
	Report

Memorial Stadium
Attendance: 4,305
Referee: Rowan Kitt

=== Round 4 ===
26 September 2009

(BP) Bedford Blues	5 - 6	Bristol
	Report

Goldington Road
Attendance: 4,067
Referee: Greg Garner

26 September 2009

Exeter Chiefs	30 - 24	Plymouth Albion (BP)
	Report

Sandy Park
Attendance: 5,072
Referee: Dean Richards

26 September 2009

(BP) Moseley	33 - 25	Doncaster Knights
	Report

Billesley Common
Attendance: 749
Referee: Paul Knowles

26 September 2009

(BP) Rotherham Titans	22 - 28	London Welsh
	Report

Clifton Lane
Attendance: 1,262
Referee: Llyr Apgeraint-Roberts

27 September 2009

Cornish Pirates	20 - 14	Coventry (BP)
	Report

Recreation Ground
Attendance: 2,695
Referee: JP Doyle

27 September 2009

(BP) Nottingham	53 - 17	Birmingham & Solihull
	Report

Meadow Lane
Attendance: 1,210
Referee: Mark Wilson

=== Round 5 ===
2 October 2009

(2BP) Coventry	25 - 28	Moseley (BP)
	Report

Butts Park Arena
Attendance: 2,003
Referee: Luke Pearce

3 October 2009

Birmingham & Solihull	0 - 29	Rotherham Titans (BP)
	Report

Sharmans Cross
Attendance: 377
Referee: Rob Debney

3 October 2009

Doncaster Knights	7 - 23	Nottingham
	Report

Castle Park
Attendance: 1,323
Referee: Keith Lewis

3 October 2009

London Welsh	28 - 17	Bedford Blues
	Report

Old Deer Park
Attendance: 2,240
Referee: Rowan Kitt

3 October 2009

Plymouth Albion	16 - 8	Cornish Pirates
	Report

Brickfields
Attendance: 4,004
Referee: David Rose

4 October 2009

Bristol	26 - 35	Exeter Chiefs (BP)
	Report

Memorial Stadium
Attendance: 6,895
Referee: Llyr Apgeraint-Roberts

=== Round 6 ===
9 October 2009

(BP) Nottingham	46 - 0	Rotherham Titans
	Report

Meadow Lane
Attendance: 1,049
Referee: Llyr Apgeraint-Roberts

10 October 2009

(BP) Bedford Blues	53 - 25	Birmingham & Solihull
	Report

Goldington Road
Attendance: 3,180
Referee: Terry Hall

10 October 2009

Exeter Chiefs	13 - 9	London Welsh (BP)
	Report

Sandy Park
Attendance: 4,378
Referee: David Rose

10 October 2009

(BP) Doncaster Knights	14 - 17	Coventry
	Report

Castle Park
Attendance: 1,310

10 October 2009

Moseley	26 - 15	Plymouth Albion
	Report

Billesley Common
Attendance: 950
Referee: Darren Gamage

11 October 2009

Cornish Pirates	13 - 35	Bristol (BP)
	Report

Recreation Ground
Attendance: 4,115
Referee: Keith Lewis

=== Round 7 ===
16 October 2009

Bristol	19 - 9	Moseley
	Report

Memorial Stadium
Attendance: 5,149
Referee: Andrew Small

16 October 2009

(BP) Coventry	13 - 18	Nottingham
	Report

Butts Park Arena
Attendance: 1,313
Referee: Tim Wigglesworth

17 October 2009

Birmingham & Solihull	21 - 51	Exeter Chiefs (BP)
	Report

Sharmans Cross
Attendance: 367
Referee: Chris Sharp

17 October 2009

Plymouth Albion	6 - 21	Doncaster Knights
	Report

Brickfields
Attendance: 2,395
Referee: Roy Maybank

17 October 2009

(BP) London Welsh	34 - 10	Cornish Pirates
	Report

Old Deer Park
Attendance: 1,980
Referee: Rowan Kitt

17 October 2009

(BP) Rotherham Titans	25 - 27	Bedford Blues
	Report

Clifton Lane
Attendance: 1,304
Referee: Michael Tutty

=== Round 8 ===
23 October 2009

Coventry	26 - 10	Plymouth Albion
	Report

Butts Park Arena
Attendance: 1,076
Referee: Graham Knox

24 October 2009

Doncaster Knights	26 - 22	Bristol (BP)
	Report

Castle Park
Attendance: 1,907
Referee: Mark Wilson

24 October 2009

(BP) Exeter Chiefs	43 - 10	Rotherham Titans
	Report

Sandy Park
Attendance: 3,828
Referee: Andrew Taylorson

24 October 2009

(BP) Moseley	17 - 21	London Welsh
	Report

Billesley Common
Attendance: 964
Referee: Rob Debney

25 October 2009

(BP) Cornish Pirates	62 - 10	Birmingham & Solihull
	Report

Recreation Ground
Attendance: 2,530
Referee: Paul Knowles

25 October 2009

Nottingham	30 - 29	Bedford Blues (BP)
	Report

Meadow Lane
Attendance: 1,584
Referee: Greg Garner

=== Round 9 ===
30 October 2009

(BP) Bristol	46 - 28	Coventry
	Report

Memorial Stadium
Attendance: 4,839
Referee: Llyr Apgeraint-Roberts

31 October 2009

Bedford Blues	11 - 20	Exeter Chiefs
	Report

Goldington Road
Attendance: 3,297
Referee: Rob Debney

31 October 2009

(BP) Birmingham & Solihull	16 - 23	Moseley
	Report

Sharmans Cross
Attendance: 1,084
Referee: Andrew Taylorson

31 October 2009

London Welsh	9 - 20	Doncaster Knights
	Report

Old Deer Park
Attendance: 1,690
Referee: Greg Garner

31 October 2009

(BP) Plymouth Albion	31 - 25	Nottingham (BP)
	Report

Brickfields
Attendance: 2,078
Referee: JP Doyle

31 October 2009

Rotherham Titans	29 - 20	Cornish Pirates
	Report

Clifton Lane
Attendance: 1,287
Referee: Andrew Small

=== Round 10 ===
6 November 2009

Coventry	10 - 19	London Welsh
	Report

Butts Park Arena
Attendance: 1,133
Referee: Paul Knowles

7 November 2009

(BP) Doncaster Knights	36 - 7	Birmingham & Solihull
	Report

Castle Park
Attendance: 1,312

7 November 2009

Moseley	31 - 27	Rotherham Titans (BP)
	Report

Billesley Common
Attendance: 978
Referee: Andrew Small

7 November 2009

Nottingham	11 - 42	Exeter Chiefs (BP)
	Report

Welford Road, Leicester
Attendance: 1,216
Referee: Keith Lewis

7 November 2009

Plymouth Albion	8 - 33	Bristol (BP)
	Report

Brickfields
Attendance: 2,993
Referee: Terry Hall

8 November 2009

Cornish Pirates	25 - 24	Bedford Blues (BP)
	Report

Recreation Ground
Attendance: 2,465
Referee: David Rose

=== Round 11 ===
13 November 2009

Bedford Blues	23 - 7	Moseley
	Report

Goldington Road
Attendance: 2,282
Referee: Dean Richards

14 November 2009

Birmingham & Solihull	6 - 21	Coventry
	Report

Sharmans Cross
Attendance: 477
Referee: Rowan Kitt

14 November 2009

Exeter Chiefs	22 - 15	Cornish Pirates (BP)
	Report

Sandy Park
Attendance: 6,158
Referee: Mark Wilson

14 November 2009

London Welsh	12 - 24	Plymouth Albion (BP)
	Report

Old Deer Park
Attendance: 874
Referee: D May

14 November 2009

Rotherham Titans	11 - 7	Doncaster Knights (BP)
	Report

Clifton Lane
Attendance: 1,610
Referee: Adrian Hartwell

15 November 2009

(BP) Bristol	35 - 11	Nottingham
	Report

Memorial Stadium
Attendance: 4,784
Referee: David Pearson

=== Round 12 ===
4 December 2009

Coventry	15 - 15	Bedford Blues
	Report

Ricoh Arena
Attendance: 1,306
Referee: Darren Gamage

5 December 2009

(BP) Doncaster Knights	9 - 14	Exeter Chiefs
	Report

Castle Park
Attendance: 1,565
Referee: Llyr Apgeraint-Roberts

5 December 2009

London Welsh	19 - 14	Nottingham (BP)
	Report

Old Deer Park
Attendance: 910
Referee: Adrian Hartwell

5 December 2009

(BP) Moseley	19 - 20	Cornish Pirates
	Report

Billesley Common
Attendance: 901
Referee: Luke Pearce

5 December 2009

Plymouth Albion	20 - 15	Rotherham Titans (BP)
	Report

Brickfields
Attendance: 1,795
Referee: Dean Richards

6 December 2009

(BP) Bristol	28 - 0	Birmingham & Solihull
	Report

Memorial Stadium
Attendance: 4,440
Referee: Paul Knowles

=== Round 13 ===
12 December 2009

(BP) Bedford Blues	16 - 19	Plymouth Albion
	Report

Goldington Road
Attendance: 2,353
Referee: Luke Pearce

12 December 2009

Birmingham & Solihull	6 - 29	London Welsh (BP)
	Report

Sharmans Cross
Attendance: 407
Referee: Chris Sharp

12 December 2009

(BP) Exeter Chiefs	45 - 11	Coventry
	Report

Sandy Park
Attendance: 3,952
Referee: Terry Hall

12 December 2009

Rotherham Titans	0 - 15	Bristol
	Report

Clifton Lane
Attendance: 1,257
Referee: Rob Debney

13 December 2009

(BP) Cornish Pirates	10 - 12	Doncaster Knights
	Report

Recreation Ground
Attendance: 2,667
Referee: Roy Maybank

13 December 2009

(BP) Nottingham	30 - 15	Moseley
	Report

Meadow Lane
Attendance: 1,303
Referee: Dean Richards

=== Round 14 ===
18 December 2009

(BP) Bristol	37 - 16	Bedford Blues
	Report

Memorial Stadium
Attendance: 4,869
Referee: Tim Wigglesworth

18 December 2009

Coventry	12 - 27	Cornish Pirates (BP)
	Report

Butts Park Arena
Attendance: 802
Referee: Mark Wilson

19 December 2009

Birmingham & Solihull	P - P	Nottingham

- Postponed. Game rescheduled to 2 February 2010.

19 December 2009

Doncaster Knights	14 - 3	Moseley
	Report

Castle Park
Attendance: 1,334
Referee: Keith Lewis

19 December 2009

(BP) London Welsh	30 - 24	Rotherham Titans (2BP)
	Report

Old Deer Park
Attendance: 961
Referee: Sean Davey

19 December 2009

Plymouth Albion	23 - 13	Exeter Chiefs
	Report

Brickfields
Attendance: 4,430
Referee: Rowan Kitt

=== Round 15 ===
26 December 2009

Bedford Blues	30 - 23	London Welsh (BP)
	Report

Goldington Road
Attendance: 4,033
Referee: Llyr Apgeraint-Roberts

26 December 2009

Moseley	26 - 20	Coventry (BP)
	Report

Billesley Common
Attendance: 998
Referee: Rowan Kitt

27 December 2009

(BP) Cornish Pirates	46 - 7	Plymouth Albion
	Report

Recreation Ground
Attendance: 5,654
Referee: Terry Hall

27 December 2009

Exeter Chiefs	16 - 25	Bristol (BP)
	Report

Sandy Park
Attendance: 7,405
Referee: Greg Garner

28 December 2009

Nottingham	P - P	Doncaster Knights

- Postponed. Game rescheduled to 20 January 2010.

28 December 2009

Rotherham Titans	P - P	Birmingham & Solihull

- Postponed. Game rescheduled to 20 January 2010.

=== Round 16 ===
1 January 2010

(BP) Bristol	31 - 15	Cornish Pirates
	Report

Memorial Stadium
Attendance: 7,714
Referee: JP Doyle

2 January 2010

Birmingham & Solihull	10 - 49	Bedford Blues (BP)
	Report

Goldington Road, Bedford
Attendance: 1,407
Referee: Darren Gamage

2 January 2010

Coventry	P - P	Doncaster Knights

- Postponed. Game rescheduled to 10 February 2010.

2 January 2010

London Welsh	12 - 10	Exeter Chiefs (BP)
	Report

Old Deer Park
Attendance: 1,632
Referee: Mark Williams

2 January 2010

Plymouth Albion	10 - 20	Moseley
	Report

Brickfields
Attendance: 2,168
Referee: Llyr Apgeraint-Roberts

2 January 2010

Rotherham Titans	P - P	Nottingham

- Postponed. Game rescheduled to 11 February 2010.

=== Round 17 ===
15 January 2010

Bristol	P - P	Doncaster Knights

- Postponed. Game rescheduled to 24 February 2010.

16 January 2010

(BP) Bedford Blues	51 - 19	Nottingham
	Report

Goldington Road
Attendance: 2,088
Referee: Rowan Kitt

16 January 2010

Plymouth Albion	20 - 3	Coventry
	Report

Brickfields
Attendance: 2,151
Referee: Tim Wigglesworth

17 January 2010

(BP) Birmingham & Solihull	31 - 31	Cornish Pirates (BP)
	Report

Sharmans Cross
Attendance: 916
Referee: Wayne Barnes

17 January 2010

London Welsh	22 - 6	Moseley
	Report

Old Deer Park
Attendance: 910
Referee: Keith Lewis

17 January 2010

(BP) Rotherham Titans	18 - 24	Exeter Chiefs
	Report

Clifton Lane
Attendance: 1,076
Referee: Michael Tutty

=== Round 15 (Rescheduled Games) ===
20 January 2010

Nottingham	27 - 21	Doncaster Knights (BP)
	Report

Meadow Lane
Attendance: 808
Referee: Llyr Apgeraint-Roberts

- Game rescheduled from 28 December 2009.

20 January 2010

(BP) Rotherham Titans	42 - 15	Birmingham & Solihull
	Report

Clifton Lane
Attendance: 812
Referee: Mark Wilson

- Game rescheduled from 28 December 2009.

=== Round 18 ===
23 January 2010

Coventry	16 - 27	Bristol (BP)
	Report

Butts Park Arena
Attendance: 1,240
Referee: Darren Gamage

23 January 2010

(BP) Doncaster Knights	10 - 17	London Welsh
	Report

Castle Park
Attendance: 1,250
Referee: Dean Richards

23 January 2010

(BP) Exeter Chiefs	45 - 19	Bedford Blues
	Report

Sandy Park
Attendance: 3,781
Referee: Chris White

23 January 2010

Moseley	25 - 24	Birmingham & Solihull (BP)
	Report

Billesley Common
Attendance: 1,051
Referee: Paul Knowles

24 January 2010

(BP) Cornish Pirates	29 - 24	Rotherham Titans (2BP)
	Report

Recreation Ground
Attendance: 2,459
Referee: Rob Debney

24 January 2010

Nottingham	20 - 19	Plymouth Albion (BP)
	Report

Meadow Lane
Attendance: 1,219
Referee: Terry Hall

=== Round 19 ===
30 January 2010

Bedford Blues	19 - 16	Cornish Pirates (BP)
	Report

Goldington Road
Attendance: 2,817
Referee: Keith Lewis

30 January 2010

Birmingham & Solihull	P - P	Doncaster Knights

- Postponed. Game rescheduled to 17 February 2010.

30 January 2010

(BP) Exeter Chiefs	42 - 12	Nottingham
	Report

Sandy Park
Attendance: 4,084
Referee: Mathieu Raynal

30 January 2010

(BP) London Welsh	51 - 13	Coventry
	Report

Old Deer Park
Attendance: 1,027
Referee: Andrew Taylorson

30 January 2010

Rotherham Titans	7 - 19	Moseley
	Report

Clifton Lane
Attendance: 1,214
Referee: Andrew Small

31 January 2010

(BP) Bristol	24 - 14	Plymouth Albion
	Report

Memorial Stadium
Attendance: 5,537
Referee: Llyr Apgeraint-Roberts

=== Round 14 (Rescheduled Game) ===
2 February 2010

Birmingham & Solihull	0 - 39	Nottingham (BP)
	Report

Billesley Common
Referee: Luke Pearce

- Game rescheduled to 19 December 2009.

=== Round 20 ===
5 February 2010

Coventry	24 - 7	Birmingham & Solihull
	Report

Butts Park Arena
Attendance: 1,012
Referee: Andrew Small

6 February 2010

(BP) Moseley	19 - 26	Bedford Blues
	Report

Billesley Common
Attendance: 759
Referee: Terry Hall

6 February 2010

Plymouth Albion	13 - 13	London Welsh
	Report

Brickfields
Attendance: 2,155
Referee: Rob Debney

7 February 2010

Cornish Pirates	15 - 30	Exeter Chiefs (BP)
	Report

Recreation Ground
Attendance: 3,661
Referee: Rowan Kitt

7 February 2010

Doncaster Knights	27 - 20	Rotherham Titans (BP)
	Report

Castle Park
Attendance: 2,174
Referee: Martin Fox

7 February 2010

(BP) Nottingham	16 - 22	Bristol
	Report

Meadow Lane
Attendance: 1,796
Referee: Keith Lewis

=== Round 16 & 19 (Rescheduled Games) ===
10 February 2010

Coventry	7 - 27	Doncaster Knights
	Report

Butts Park Arena
Attendance: 618
Referee: Andrew Taylorson

- Game rescheduled from 2 January 2010.

16 February 2010

Rotherham Titans	28 - 24	Nottingham (2BP)
	Report

Clifton Lane
Attendance: 521
Referee: Chris Sharp

- Game rescheduled from 2 January 2010.

17 February 2010

Birmingham & Solihull	7 - 33	Doncaster Knights (BP)
	Report

Billesley Common
Attendance: 200
Referee: Michael Tutty

- Game rescheduled from 30 January 2010.

=== Round 21 ===
20 February 2010

Bedford Blues	12 - 23	Doncaster Knights
	Report

Goldington Road
Attendance: 2,241
Referee: Cedric Marchat

20 February 2010

Birmingham & Solihull	21 - 36	Plymouth Albion (BP)
	Report

Sharmans Cross
Attendance: 926

20 February 2010

(BP) Exeter Chiefs	36 - 19	Moseley
	Report

Sandy Park
Attendance: 3,525
Referee: Darren Gamage

20 February 2010

London Welsh	3 - 28	Bristol
	Report

Old Deer Park
Attendance: 2,150
Referee: Llyr Apgeraint-Roberts

20 February 2010

(BP) Rotherham Titans	41 - 11	Coventry
	Report

Clifton Lane
Attendance: 1,019
Referee: Paul Knowles

21 February 2010

(BP) Cornish Pirates	47 - 19	Nottingham
	Report

Recreation Ground
Attendance: 2,321
Referee: Terry Hall

=== Round 17 (Rescheduled Game) ===
24 February 2010

(BP) Bristol	42 - 7	Doncaster Knights
	Report

Memorial Stadium
Attendance: 4,315
Referee: Rowan Kitt

- Game rescheduled from 15 January 2010.

=== Round 22 ===
13 March 2010

Bedford Blues	33 - 26	Rotherham Titans (2BP)
	Report

Goldington Road
Attendance: 1,642
Referee: Keith Lewis

13 March 2010

(BP) Cornish Pirates	24 - 28	London Welsh
	Report

Recreation Ground
Attendance: 1,560
Referee: Wayne Barnes

13 March 2010

(BP) Doncaster Knights	13 - 20	Plymouth Albion
	Report

Castle Park
Attendance: 1,642
Referee: JP Doyle

13 March 2010

(BP) Exeter Chiefs	62 - 12	Birmingham & Solihull
	Report

Sandy Park
Attendance: 3,477
Referee: Michael Tutty

13 March 2010

Moseley	30 - 25	Bristol (2BP)
	Report

Billesley Common
Attendance: 1,564
Referee: Martin Fox

13 March 2010

(BP) Nottingham	37 - 10	Coventry
	Report

Meadow Lane
Attendance: 790
Referee: Andrew Taylorson

== Stage 2: Playoffs ==
=== Promotion ===
Winner of Pool A to play Runner-Up of Pool B, and Winner of Pool B to play Runner-Up of Pool A.

Group A:

Pos	Team	P	W	D	L	F	A	BP	PTS
1	Bristol	6	5	0	1	189	86	4	24
2	Bedford	6	4	0	2	154	125	4	20
3	Cornish Pirates	6	2	0	4	98	158	2	10
4	Plymouth Albion	6	1	0	5	57	129	1	5

=== Round 1 ===
19 March 2010

Bristol	19 - 12	Cornish Pirates (BP)
	Report

Memorial Stadium
Attendance: 5,892
Referee: Rowan Kitt

20 March 2010

(BP) Plymouth Albion	9 - 10	Bedford Blues
	Report

Brickfields
Attendance: 1,384
Referee: David Rose

=== Round 2 ===
27 March 2010

Bedford Blues	17 - 16	Bristol (BP)
	Report

Goldington Road
Attendance: 2,611
Referee: JP Doyle

28 March 2010

Cornish Pirates	17 - 0	Plymouth Albion
	Report

Recreation Ground
Attendance: 2,849
Referee: Llyr Apgeraint-Roberts

=== Round 3 ===
2 April 2010

Bristol	15 - 3	Plymouth Albion
	Report

Memorial Stadium
Attendance: 7,020
Referee: Andrew Taylorson

4 April 2010

Cornish Pirates	22 - 18	Bedford Blues (BP)
	Report

Recreation Ground
Attendance: 3,359
Referee: Rowan Kitt

=== Round 4 ===
10 April 2010

Plymouth Albion	7 - 38	Bristol (BP)
	Report

Brickfields
Attendance: 3,275
Referee: Rowan Kitt

10 April 2010

(BP) Bedford Blues	42 - 18	Cornish Pirates
	Report

Goldington Road
Attendance: 2,599
Referee: Llyr Apgeraint-Roberts

=== Round 5 ===
16 April 2010

Plymouth Albion	19 - 14	Cornish Pirates (BP)
	Report

Brickfields
Attendance: 4,141
Referee: David Rose

18 April 2010

(BP) Bristol	41 - 32	Bedford Blues (BP)
	Report

Memorial Stadium
Attendance: 6,701
Referee: Rob Debney

=== Round 6 ===
1 May 2010

(BP) Bedford Blues	35 - 19	Plymouth Albion
	Report

Goldington Road
Attendance: 3,302
Referee: Rowan Kitt

1 May 2010

Cornish Pirates	15 - 60	Bristol (BP)
	Report

Recreation Ground
Attendance: 3,190
Referee: Michael Tutty

Group B:

Pos	Team	P	W	D	L	F	A	BP	PTS
1	Exeter	6	4	0	2	181	86	4	20
2	London Welsh	6	4	0	2	108	110	2	18
3	Nottingham	6	2	0	4	98	141	2	10
4	Doncaster	6	2	0	4	108	158	1	9

=== Round 1 ===
21 March 2010

Nottingham	20 - 9	Exeter Chiefs
	Report

Meadow Lane
Attendance: 1,072
Referee: Rob Debney

20 March 2010

(BP) London Welsh	26 - 10	Doncaster Knights
	Report

Old Deer Park
Attendance: 520
Referee: Llyr Apgeraint-Roberts

=== Round 2 ===
27 March 2010

Doncaster Knights	25 - 15	Nottingham
	Report

Castle Park
Attendance: 1,011
Referee: Chris Sharp

27 March 2010

(BP) Exeter Chiefs	32 - 6	London Welsh
	Report

Sandy Park
Attendance: 4,342
Referee: Keith Lewis

=== Round 3 ===
3 April 2010

(BP) Doncaster Knights	19 - 21	Exeter Chiefs
	Report

Castle Park
Attendance: 1,050
Referee: Dean Richards

3 April 2010

London Welsh	12 - 29	Nottingham (BP)
	Report

Old Deer Park
Attendance: 960
Referee: Martin Fox

=== Round 4 ===
10 April 2010

(BP) Exeter Chiefs	51 - 15	Doncaster Knights
	Report

Sandy Park
Attendance: 4,181
Referee: David Rose

10 April 2010

(BP) Nottingham	10 - 17	London Welsh
	Report

Meadow Lane
Attendance: 1,339
Referee: Sean Davey

=== Round 5 ===
17 April 2010

London Welsh	16 - 15	Exeter Chiefs (BP)
	Report

Old Deer Park
Attendance: 1,100
Referee: Llyr Apgeraint-Roberts

18 April 2010

Nottingham	14 - 25	Doncaster Knights
	Report

Meadow Lane
Attendance: 1,354
Referee: Andrew Taylorson

=== Round 6 ===
1 May 2010

Doncaster Knights	14 - 31	London Welsh (BP)
	Report

Castle Park
Attendance: 1,389
Referee: Rob Debney

1 May 2010

(BP) Exeter Chiefs	53 - 10	Nottingham
	Report

Sandy Park
Attendance: 5,344
Referee: Sean Davey

=== Relegation ===
Bottom club in Group C relegated to National League 1

Group C:

Pos	Team	P	W	D	L	F	A	BP	PTS
1	Rotherham	6	5	0	1	188	116	7	27
2	Moseley	6	2	0	4	153	132	7	15
3	Birmingham & Solihull	6	3	0	3	158	169	3	13*
4	Coventry (R)	6	2	0	4	82	164	2	10

- Birmingham & Solihull deducted 2 points for fielding an unregistered player

Coventry are relegated to National League 1.

=== Round 1 ===
20 March 2010

Birmingham & Solihull	19 - 12	Moseley (BP)
	Report

Sharmans Cross
Attendance: 350
Referee: Dean Richards

20 March 2010

(BP) Rotherham Titans	29 - 3	Coventry
	Report

Clifton Lane
Attendance: 872
Referee: Shane Lewis

=== Round 2 ===
27 March 2010

(BP) Coventry	18 - 25	Birmingham & Solihull
	Report

Butts Park Arena
Attendance: 1,344
Referee: Rowan Kitt

27 March 2010

(2BP) Moseley	29 - 30	Rotherham Titans (BP)
	Report

Billesley
Attendance: 832
Referee: Andrew Taylorson

=== Round 3 ===
3 April 2010

Coventry	6 - 3	Moseley (BP)
	Report

Butts Park Arena
Attendance: 1,123
Referee: JP Doyle

3 April 2010

(BP) Rotherham Titans	33 - 20	Birmingham & Solihull
	Report

Clifton Lane
Attendance: 1,223
Referee: Michael Tutty

=== Round 4 ===
11 April 2010

Birmingham & Solihull	19 - 29	Rotherham Titans (BP)
	Report

Sharmans Cross
Attendance: 250
Referee: Andrew Taylorson

11 April 2010

Moseley	P - P	Coventry

- Postponed. Game rescheduled to 24 April 2010.

=== Round 5 ===
17 April 2010

(2BP) Rotherham Titans	29 - 33	Moseley (BP)
	Report

Clifton Lane
Attendance: 1,302
Referee: Rowan Kitt

18 April 2010

(2BP) Birmingham & Solihull	35 - 38	Coventry (BP)
	Report

Sharmans Cross
Referee: Greg Garner

=== Round 4 (Rescheduled Game) ===
24 April 2010

(BP) Moseley	37 - 5	Coventry
	Report

Billesley Common
Attendance: 1,474
Referee: Rob Debney

=== Round 6 ===
1 May 2010

Coventry	12 - 38	Rotherham Titans (BP)
	Report

Butts Park Arena
Attendance: 1,613
Referee: Llyr Apgeraint-Roberts

1 May 2010

(2BP) Moseley	34 - 38	Birmingham & Solihull (BP)
	Report

Billesley
Attendance: 850
Referee: David Rose

== Stage 3 ==
=== Semi-finals ===
The semifinals were one-off single ties held between the winner of Group A and the runner-up of Group B, and the winner of Group B and the runner-up of Group A. The matches took place at the home ground of the group winners.

7 May 210

Bristol	28 – 15	London Welsh
	Report

Memorial Stadium, Bristol
Attendance: 5,717
Referee: David Rose

8 May 210

Exeter Chiefs	37 – 8	Bedford Blues
	Report

Sandy Park, Exeter
Attendance: 4,549
Referee: Tim Wigglesworth

=== Final ===
The two-legged final took place at the home grounds of the two clubs involved, rather than at Twickenham.

19 May 2010

Exeter Chiefs	9 - 6	Bristol
	Report

Sandy Park, Exeter
Attendance: 10,021
Referee: David Pearson

26 May 2010

Bristol	10 - 29	Exeter Chiefs
	Report

Memorial Stadium, Bristol
Attendance: 11,550
Referee: Andrew Small

Exeter Chiefs win the Championship and earn promotion to the 2010–11 Premiership.

== Total Season Attendances ==
- Figures include playoff semi finals and final

Club	Home Games	Total	Average	Highest	Lowest	% Capacity
Bedford Blues	14	39,364	2,812	4,067	1,642	56%
Birmingham & Solihull	12 (Note: Missing home attendances v Nottingham on 2 February 2010 and Coventry on 18 April 2010.)	7,984	665	1,407	200	19%
Bristol	16	94,752	5,922	11,550	4,305	49%
Cornish Pirates	14	42,157	3,011	5,654	1,560	33%
Coventry	14	17,473	1,248	2,003	618	29%
Doncaster Knights	14	20,243	1,446	2,174	1,011	47%
Exeter Chiefs	16	77,670	4,854	10,021	3,477	49%
London Welsh	14	18,604	1,329	2,240	520	23%
Moseley	14	13,652	975	1,564	749	33%
Nottingham	14	16,978	1,213	1,796	790	6%
Plymouth Albion	14	37,448	2,675	4,430	1,384	41%
Rotherham Titans	14	15,884	1,135	1,610	521	45%

== Individual statistics ==
- Player stats include playoff games as well as regular season games. Also note that points scorers includes tries as well as conversions, penalties and drop goals.

=== Top points scorers ===
Rank	Player	Team	Appearances	Points
1	(Ireland) Gareth Steenson	Exeter Chiefs	26	280
2	(England) Adrian Jarvis	Bristol	31	274
3	(England) Tristan Roberts	Moseley	26	267
4	(Wales) Aled Thomas	London Welsh	29	226
5	(Canada) James Pritchard	Bedford Blues	22	209
6	(England) Rob Cook	Cornish Pirates	24	196
7	(England) Simon Hunt	Birmingham & Solihull	21	166
8	(England) Jonathan West	Rotherham Titans	24	159
9	(Scotland) Greig Tonks	Nottingham	25	135
9	(Ireland) Keiran Hallett	Plymouth Albion	26	135

=== Top try scorers ===
Rank	Player	Team	Appearances	Tries
1	(Scotland) Blair Cowan	Cornish Pirates	21	14
1	(South Africa) Errie Claassens	London Welsh	26	14
1	(England) Matthew Jess	Exeter Chiefs	28	14
2	(England) David Norton	Bristol	19	13
3	(England) Lee Robinson	Bristol	24	12
3	(England) Tim Streather	Nottingham	28	12
3	(England) Mark Foster	Exeter Chiefs	29	12
4	(England) Simon Hunt	Birmingham & Solihull	21	11
4	(England) Tom Arscott	Bristol	27	11
4	(England) James Phillips	Bristol	29	11

== Season records ==
=== Team ===
Largest home win — 52 pts

62 - 10 Cornish Pirates at home to Birmingham & Solihull on 25 October 2009

Largest away win — 45 pts

60 - 15 Bristol away to Cornish Pirates on 1 May 2010

Most points scored — 62 pts (x2)

62 - 10 Cornish Pirates at home to Birmingham & Solihull on 25 October 2009
62 - 12 Exeter Chiefs at home to Birmingham & Solihull on 13 March 2010

Most tries in a match — 10

Bristol away to Cornish Pirates on 1 May 2010

Most conversions in a match — 7

Cornish Pirates at home to Birmingham & Solihull on 25 October 2009

Most penalties in a match — 6 (x4)

Exeter Chiefs at home to Doncaster Knights on 12 September 2009
Rotherham Titans at home to Cornish Pirates on 31 October 2009
Moseley at home to Bristol on 13 March 2010
Exeter Chiefs away to Bristol on 26 May 2010

Most drop goals in a match — 2 (x3)

Doncaster Knights at home to Bristol on 24 October 2009
Rotherham Titans at home to Cornish Pirates on 31 October 2009
Exeter Chiefs away to Bristol on 26 May 2010

=== Player ===
Most points in a match — 24 (x2)

(Canada) James Pritchard for Bedford Blues at home to Nottingham on 16 January 2010
(Ireland) Gareth Steenson for Exeter Chiefs away to Bristol on 26 May 2010

Most tries in a match — 4 (x2)

(England) Ian Davey for Bedford Blues at home to Birmingham & Solihull on 10 October 2009
(Scotland) Callum MacBurnie for Moseley at home to Birmingham & Solihull on 1 May 2010

Most conversions in a match — 7

(England) James Moore for Cornish Pirates at home to Birmingham & Solihull on 25 October 2009

Most penalties in a match — 6 (x4)

(Ireland) Gareth Steenson for Exeter Chiefs at home to Doncaster Knights on 12 September 2009
(England) Jonathan West for Rotherham Titans at home to Cornish Pirates on 31 October 2009
(England) Tristan Roberts for Moseley at home to Bristol on 13 March 2010
(Ireland) Gareth Steenson for Exeter Chiefs away to Bristol on 26 May 2010

Most drop goals in a match — 2

(Ireland) Gareth Steenson for Exeter Chiefs away to Bristol on 26 May 2010

=== Attendances ===
Highest — 11,550

Bristol at home to Exeter Chiefs on 26 May 2010

Lowest — 200

Birmingham & Solihull at home to Doncaster Knights on 17 February 2010

Highest Average Attendance — 5,922

Bristol

Lowest Average Attendance — 665 (Note: Birmingham & Solihull are missing 2 home attendances so figure will not be 100% accurate.)

Birmingham & Solihull
