= Bristol Combination Cyril Parsons Bowl =

Rugby union competition in south-west England

- Sport: Rugby Union
- Instituted: 2012; 14 years ago
- Number of teams: 13
- Country: England
- Holders: Old Colstonians (2nd title) (2018–19)
- Most titles: Old Colstonians (2 titles)
- Website: Bristol & District Rugby Football Combination

The Bristol Combination Cyril Parsons Bowl is an annual rugby union knock-out club competition organised by the Bristol and District Rugby Football Combination – one of the five bodies that make up the Gloucestershire Rugby Football Union. It was first introduced during the 2012–13 season, with the inaugural winners being Winscombe, and is the third most important competition organised by the Bristol Combination, behind the Bristol Combination Cup and Bristol Combination Vase.

The Bristol Combination Vase is currently open for clubs sides based in Bristol and the surrounding countryside (including parts of Gloucestershire and Somerset), typically based in tier 9 (Gloucester 1/Somerset 1), tier 10 (Gloucester 2) and tier 11 (Gloucester 3). The format is a cup knockout with a first round, quarter-finals, semi-finals and a final held at a neutral venue between April–May.

== Bristol Combination Cyril Parsons Bowl winners ==
Bristol Combination Cyril Parsons Bowl Finals
Season	Winner	Score	Runners–up	Venue	Attendance
2012–13	Winscombe	17–15	Gordano	Valhalla, Brislington, Bristol	
2013–14	Chipping Sodbury	30–20	St Bernadettes Old Boys	Valhalla, Brislington, Bristol	
2014–15	St Mary's Old Boys	71–5	Ashley Down	Valhalla, Brislington, Bristol	
2015–16	Bristol Barbarians	38–16	Old Elizabethans	The Hayfields, Mangotsfield, Bristol	1,000
2016–17	Bristol Barbarians	34–33	Bishopston	The Hayfields, Mangotsfield, Bristol	650
2017–18	Old Colstonians	37-14	Bristol Harlequins	Lockleaze Sports Centre, Lockleaze, Bristol	
2018-19 [9]	Old Colstonians	17-7	Old Elizabethans	Lockleaze Sports Centre, Lockleaze, Bristol	

== Number of wins ==
- Bristol Barbarians (2)
- Chipping Sodbury (1)
- Old Colstonians (1)
- St Mary's Old Boys (1)
- Winscombe (1)

== See also ==
- Gloucestershire RFU
- Bristol and District Rugby Football Combination
- Bristol Combination Cup
- Bristol Combination Vase
- English rugby union system
- Rugby union in England
