= Bristol Combination Cup =

Rugby union competition in south-west England

- Sport: Rugby Union
- Instituted: 1970; 56 years ago
- Country: England
- Holders: Weston-super-Mare (1st title) (2018–19)
- Most titles: St Mary's Old Boys (11 titles)
- Website: Bristol & District Rugby Football Combination

The Bristol Combination Cup is an annual rugby union knock-out club competition organised by the Bristol and District Rugby Football Combination – one of the five bodies that make up the Gloucestershire Rugby Football Union. It was first introduced during the 1970–71 season, with the inaugural winners being Bristol Harlequins. A plate competition was introduced during the 1985–86 season for teams knocked out of the early rounds of the Bristol Combination Cup, with St Brendans Old Boys being the inaugural winners. The plate was discontinued at the end of the 2002–03 season and has since been replaced by the Bristol Combination Vase, which is for lower ranked clubs in the region.

The Bristol Combination Cup is currently open for clubs sides based in Bristol and the surrounding countryside (including parts of Gloucestershire and Somerset), playing in tier 4 (National League 2 South), tier 5 (National League 3 South West) and tier 6 (Tribute South West 1 West) of the English rugby union league system. The format is a knockout cup with quarter-finals, semi-finals and a final to be held at the Memorial Stadium in Bristol in April–May.

== Bristol Combination Cup winners ==
Bristol Combination Cup Finals
Season	Winner	Score	Runners–up	Venue	Attendance
1970–71	Bristol Harlequins				
1971–72	St. Brendans Old Boys				
1972–73	Avonmouth Old Boys				
1973–74	Dings Crusaders				
1974–75	Old Bristolians				
1975–76	St Mary's Old Boys				
1976–77	Bristol Harlequins				
1977–78	St Mary's Old Boys				
1978–79	St Mary's Old Boys				
1979–80	Old Redcliffians				
1980–81	St Mary's Old Boys				
1981–82	Keynsham				
1982–83	Old Redcliffians				
1983–84	Avonmouth Old Boys				
1984–85	Old Redcliffians				
1985–86	Dings Crusaders				
1986–87	Avonmouth Old Boys				
1987–88	Avonmouth Old Boys				
1988–89	St Mary's Old Boys				
1989–90	Avonmouth Old Boys				
1990–91	Dings Crusaders				
1991–92	Whitehall				
1992–93	Cleve		St Mary's Old Boys		
1993–94	Avonmouth Old Boys				
1994–95	Dings Crusaders				
1995–96	Dings Crusaders				
1996–97	St Mary's Old Boys				
1997–98	St Mary's Old Boys				
1998–99	Hornets				
1999-00	St Mary's Old Boys		Old Redcliffians		
2000–01	St Mary's Old Boys				
2001–02	Clevedon				
2002–03	Hornets				
2003–04	St Mary's Old Boys				
2004–05	Keynsham				
2005–06	Cleve		St Mary's Old Boys		
2006–07	St Mary's Old Boys				
2007–08	Cleve	61–5	Clevedon	Memorial Stadium, Bristol	
2008–09	Clifton	45–21	St Mary's Old Boys	Memorial Stadium, Bristol	
2009–10	Avonmouth Old Boys	14–0	Dings Crusaders	Memorial Stadium, Bristol	
2010–11	Dings Crusaders	36–18	Weston-super-Mare	Memorial Stadium, Bristol	
2011–12	Avonmouth Old Boys	23–15	Thornbury	Memorial Stadium, Bristol	
2012–13	Old Redcliffians	35–28	Dings Crusaders	Memorial Stadium, Bristol	1,500
2013–14	Clifton	21–16	Dings Crusaders	Memorial Stadium, Bristol	
2014–15	Dings Crusaders		Cleve	Memorial Stadium, Bristol	
2015–16	Clifton	48–10	Cleve	Memorial Stadium, Bristol	
2016–17	Clifton	30–7	Old Redcliffians	Memorial Stadium, Bristol	554
2017–18	Clifton	28–26	Cleve	Shaftesbury Park, Bristol	666
2018–19	Weston-super-Mare	49–27	Thornbury	Shaftesbury Park, Bristol	
2019-2020	Hornets	71-12	Barton Hill	Shaftesbury Park, Bristol	

== Bristol Combination Plate winners ==
Bristol Combination Plate Finals
Season	Winner	Score	Runners–up	Venue	Attendance
1985–86	St Brendans Old Boys				
1986–87	Aretians				
1987–88	Bristol Harlequins				
1988–89	Frampton Cotterell				
1989–90	Old Redcliffians				
1990–91	Bristol Harlequins				
1991–92	Avonmouth Old Boys				
1992–93	Avonmouth Old Boys				
1993–94	Thornbury				
1994–95	Ashley Down Old Boys				
1995–96	Southmead				
1996–97	Bristol Saracens				
1997–98	Chipping Sodbury				
1998–99	Ashley Down Old Boys				
1999-00	Gordano				
2000–01	Frampton Cotterell				
2001–02	Avonmouth Old Boys				
2002–03	Aretians				

== Number of wins ==
=== Cup ===
- St Mary's Old Boys (11)
- Avonmouth Old Boys (8)
- Dings Crusaders (7)
- Clifton (5)
- Old Redcliffians (4)
- Cleve (3)
- Hornets (3)
- Bristol Harlequins (2)
- Keynsham (2)
- Clevedon (1)
- Old Bristolians (1)
- St. Brendans Old Boys (1)
- Weston-super-Mare (1)
- Whitehall (1)

=== Plate ===
- Avonmouth Old Boys (3)
- Aretians (2)
- Ashley Down Old Boys (2)
- Bristol Harlequins (2)
- Frampton Cotterell (2)
- Bristol Saracens (1)
- Chipping Sodbury (1)
- Gordano (1)
- Old Redcliffians (1)
- Southmead (1)
- St Brendans Old Boys (1)
- Thornbury (1)

== See also ==
- Gloucestershire RFU
- Bristol and District Rugby Football Combination
- Bristol Combination Vase
- Bristol Combination Cyril Parsons Bowl
- English rugby union system
- Rugby union in England
