= Drybrook RFC =

English rugby union club, based in Gloucestershire

- Full name: Drybrook Rugby Football Club
- Union: Gloucestershire RFU
- Founded: 1893; 132 years ago
- Location: Drybrook, Gloucestershire
- Ground: Mannings Ground
- Chairman: Christopher Rawlings
- President: Chris Tingle
- League: Regional 1 midlands
- 2024–25: 1st (promoted to Regional 1 Midlands)

Official website
- drybrookrfc.com

Drybrook Rugby Club is an English rugby union club based in Drybrook, Gloucestershire. The first XV currently play in Regional 1 midlands, a level five league in the English rugby union league system

== Honours ==
- Gloucestershire 1 champions: 1988–89
- Gloucester Premier champions (3): 2002–03, 2008–09, 2012–13
- Western Counties North champions: 2013–14
- South West 1 West champions: 2017–18
- Regional 2 Severn champions: 2024–25
