= Gloucestershire Rugby Football Union =

(England) Gloucestershire RFU
- Full name: Gloucestershire Rugby Football Union
- Union: RFU
- Founded: 1878; 147 years ago
- Region: Gloucestershire, Bristol
- Chairman: Christopher Grigg
- President: Dr. Emily Ryall
Team kit

Official website
- gloucestershirerfu.co.uk

The Gloucestershire Rugby Football Union is the union responsible for rugby union in the county of Gloucestershire, England and is one of the constituent bodies of the national Rugby Football Union. Formed in 1878, it has won the county championship on numerous occasions.

== History ==
The Union was formed at a meeting held at Gloucester in September, 1878. At that meeting, the clubs represented were Clifton RFC, Gloucester RFC, Royal Agricultural College, Cirencester RFC, Rockleage, Stroud, and Cheltenham White Cross. The Union was formed mainly due to the efforts of J. D. Miller, J. H. Dunn, and J. F. Brown. all of whom were amongst the Union's first officers. For many years, the playing strength depended almost entirely on the Clifton and Gloucester Clubs. In the first five seasons the Union side only lost two of seventeen fixtures in Inter-County matches. The RFU recognised its success by electing in 1880 J. D. Miller to represent the West of England on the central executive. Ironically, the representative side then went through a period in which they had a very poor record. From 1883 to 1889 the team played only 10 times and of these 6 were lost, 3 drawn, and only 1 won. It was noted that the fortunes of the county side mirrored the success of the Gloucester City club side. When the Gloucester City side revived in the early 1890s, so to did the County, and in the seasons 1889-90, 1890–91, 1891–92, Gloucestershire lost two matches only.

In the first year of the County Championship (1890–91) Gloucestershire were the winners in the South-Western group, but when they entered the second phase, they were crushed by Lancashire.

== County side ==
=== Honours ===
Year	Winners	Home team	Score	Away team	Venue	Notes
1902	Durham County	Gloucestershire	3-9	Durham County	Gloucester	
1910	Gloucestershire	Gloucestershire	23-0	Yorkshire	Gloucester	
1913	Gloucestershire	Cumberland	3-14	Gloucestershire	Carlisle	
1920	Gloucestershire	Yorkshire	3-27	Gloucestershire	Bradford	
1921	Gloucestershire	Gloucestershire	31-4	Leicestershire	Kingsholm	
1922	Gloucestershire	North Midlands	0-19	Gloucestershire	Aston Villa	
1925	Leicestershire	Gloucestershire	6-14	Leicestershire	Bristol	
1930	Gloucestershire	Lancashire	7-13	Gloucestershire	Blundellsands	
1931	Gloucestershire	Gloucestershire	10-9	Warwickshire	Gloucester	
1932	Gloucestershire	Durham County	3-9	Gloucestershire	Blaydon-on-Tyne	
1934	East Midlands	East Midlands	10-0	Gloucestershire	Northampton	
1937	Gloucestershire	Gloucestershire	5-0	East Midlands	Bristol	
1947	Lancashire	Lancashire	8-8	Gloucestershire	Blundellsands	
1947	Lancashire	Gloucestershire	3-14	Lancashire	Kingsholm	Replay match
1949	Lancashire	Lancashire	9-3	Gloucestershire	Blundellsands	
1959	Warwickshire	Gloucestershire	9-14	Warwickshire	Memorial Ground Bristol	
1970	Staffordshire	Staffordshire	11-9	Gloucestershire	Burton on Trent	
1971	Surrey	Gloucestershire	3-14	Surrey	Kingsholm	
1972	Gloucestershire	Warwickshire	6-11	Gloucestershire	Coundon Road, Coventry	
1973	Lancashire	Gloucestershire	12-17	Lancashire	Memorial Ground Bristol	
1974	Gloucestershire	Lancashire	12-22	Gloucestershire	Blundellsands	
1975	Gloucestershire	Gloucestershire	13-9	East Counties	Kingsholm	
1976	Gloucestershire	Middlesex	9-24	Gloucestershire	Richmond Athletic Ground	
1978	North Midlands	North Midlands	10-7	Gloucestershire	The Reddings, Moseley	
1980	Lancashire	Lancashire	21-15	Gloucestershire	Vale of Lune	
1982	Northumberland	Gloucestershire	6-15	Northumberland	Kingsholm	
1983	Gloucestershire	Gloucestershire	19-7	Yorkshire	Memorial Ground Bristol	

From 1984 all Championship finals were played at Twickenham.

Year	Winners	Score	Runner's Up	Venue	Notes
1984	Gloucestershire	36-18	Somerset	Twickenham	
1996	Gloucestershire	17-13	Warwickshire	Twickenham	
1999	Cornwall	25-15	Gloucestershire	Twickenham	
2002	Gloucestershire	26-23	Cheshire	Twickenham	
2003	Lancashire	24-18	Gloucestershire	Twickenham	
2004	Devon	43-14	Gloucestershire	Twickenham	
2009	Lancashire	32-18	Gloucestershire	Twickenham	

=== Notable players for the County side ===
Many notable players have represented the county.

- British and Irish Lions
  - John Gordon A'Bear
  - Mike Teague
  - Mike Burton
- England internationals
  - J. A. Bush
  - W. O. Moberly
  - H. C. Baker
- Wales internationals
  - S. H. Nicholls
  - W. Watts
  - G. Rowles
- Scotland internationals
  - H. L. Evans (Clifton)
  - H.F. Chambers (Cheltenham)
  - D. Hilton (Clifton)

== Affiliated clubs ==
Formed by Clifton RFC, Gloucester RFC, Royal Agricultural College, Cirencester RFC, Rockleage, Stroud, and Cheltenham White Cross, by 1891, the Union consisted of ten clubs, viz., Gloucester, Clifton, Royal Agricultural College, Cirencester, Bristol, Cheltenham, Lydney, Sharpness, Dursley, Stroud, and Gordon Wanderers (Gloucester). In its early days, only Gloucester City was rated as a first class side, and this was deemed the county's weakness. Since then, the fortunes of the constituent clubs has varied enormously.

Today there are 74 clubs affiliated with the Gloucestershire RFU, most of which have teams at both senior and junior level. Geographically, most clubs in the RFU are from Gloucestershire or Bristol, although several teams are based in bordering counties such as Somerset. In turn clubs are affiliated with one of the five combinations – Bristol, Cheltenham, Forest of Dean, North Gloucestershire and Stroud – that make up the Gloucestershire RFU.

- 7 Bamboos (Note: Despite being based in Bristol, 7 Bamboos are not members of the Bristol Combination.)
- Aretians (Bristol)
- Ashley Down Old Boys (Bristol)
- Avonmouth Old Boys (Bristol)
- Barton Hill (Bristol)
- Berry Hill (Forest of Dean)
- Bishopston (Bristol)
- Bream (Forest of Dean)
- Bristol Aeroplane Co. (Bristol)
- Bristol Bears (Bristol)
- Bristol Bisons (Bristol)
- Bristol Saracens (Bristol)
- Bristol Telephone Area (Bristol)
- Broad Plain (Bristol)
- Brockworth (North Gloucestershire)
- Cheltenham (Cheltenham)
- Cheltenham Civil Service (Cheltenham)
- Cheltenham North (Cheltenham)
- Cheltenham Saracens (Cheltenham)
- Chipping Sodbury (Bristol)
- Chosen Hill Former Pupils (North Gloucestershire)
- Cinderford (Forest of Dean)
- Cirencester (Stroud)
- Cleve (Bristol)
- Clifton (Bristol)
- Coney Hill (North Gloucestershire)
- Cotham Park (Bristol)
- Dings Crusaders (Bristol)
- Dowty (North Gloucestershire)
- Drybrook (Forest of Dean)
- Dursley (Stroud)
- Fairford (Stroud)
- Frampton Cotterell (Bristol)
- Gloucester All Blues (North Gloucestershire)
- Gloucester Old Boys (North Gloucestershire)
- Gloucester Rugby (Note: Despite being the premier club in Gloucester and Kingsholm hosting combination finals, Gloucester Rugby are not members of the North Gloucestershire Combination.)
- Gloucestershire Constabulary (Cheltenham)
- Gordon League (North Gloucestershire)
- Hardwicke & Quedgeley Harlequins (North Gloucestershire)
- Hartpury College (Note: Administratively, Hartpury College is located in the Forest of Dean but they are not part of any combination.)
- Hucclecote (North Gloucestershire)
- Kingswood (Bristol)
- Longlevens (North Gloucestershire)
- Lydney (Forest of Dean)
- Matson (North Gloucestershire)
- Minchinhampton (Stroud)
- Newent (Forest of Dean)
- North Bristol (Bristol)
- Norton (Cheltenham)
- Old Bristolians (Bristol) (Note: Old Bristolians are joint members of both the Gloucestershire RFU and Somerset RFU.)
- Old Centralians (North Gloucestershire)
- Old Cryptians (North Gloucestershire)
- Old Elizabethans (Bristol)
- Old Patesians (Cheltenham)
- Old Richians (North Gloucestershire)
- Painswick (Stroud)
- Royal Agricultural University (Stroud)
- Smiths (Industries) (Cheltenham)
- Southmead (Bristol)
- Spartans (North Gloucestershire)
- St Mary's Old Boys (Bristol)
- Stow-on-the-Wold (Cheltenham)
- Stroud (Stroud)
- Tetbury (Stroud)
- Tewkesbury (Cheltenham)
- The Peeler (Bristol)
- Thornbury (Bristol)
- United Bristol Hospitals (Note: Despite being based in Bristol, United Bristol Hospitals are not members of the Bristol Combination.)
- University of Bristol (Bristol)
- University of Gloucestershire (Note: Despite being based in Cheltenham, University of Gloucestershire are not members of the Cheltenham Combination.)
- University of the West of England (Note: Despite being based in Bristol, University of the West of England are not members of the Bristol Combination.)
- Whitehall (Bristol)
- Widden Old Boys (North Gloucestershire)
- Wotton (Stroud)

== County club competitions ==
The Gloucester RFU currently runs the following club competitions for club sides in Gloucestershire and parts of Bristol:

=== Leagues ===
- Gloucester Premier – league for clubs at tier 8 of the English rugby union system between tiers 5-11
- Gloucester 1 – league for Gloucestershire sides at tier 9
- Gloucester 2 North – regional league for Gloucestershire sides at tier 10
- Gloucester 2 South – regional league for Gloucestershire sides at tier 11

Discontinued leagues:

- Gloucester 3 - tier 11/12 league that ran between 1987–2017
- Gloucester 4 - tier 12/13 league that ran between 1987–1996

=== Cups ===
Although in the past there has been a cup covering the whole of the county, Gloucestershire currently has competitions for each of the five affiliated bodies that make up the Gloucestershire RFU. These are as follows:

Bristol Combination

- Bristol Cup – founded in 1970 for club sides in and around Bristol at tiers 4-6 of the English rugby union system
- Bristol Vase – founded in 2003 for clubs at tiers 7-8
- Bristol Cyril Parsons Bowl – founded in 2012 for clubs sides at tiers 9-11

Cheltenham Combination

- Cheltenham Cup

Forest of Dean Combination

- Forest of Dean Cup

North Gloucestershire Combination

- North Gloucestershire Senior Cup – founded in 1903 for club sides based in Gloucester and north Gloucestershire between tiers 5-11
- North Gloucestershire Junior Cup – founded in 1913 for 2nd teams
- North Gloucestershire Glanville Cup – founded in 1975 for 3rd teams

Stroud & District Combination

- Stroud & District Senior Cup – founded in 1974 for club sides based in Stroud District between tiers 7-11
- Stroud & District Junior Cup – founded in 1976, primarily for 2nd teams
- Stroud & District Bill Adams Cup – founded in 1980, primarily for 3rd teams

== See also ==
- South West Division
- English rugby union system
