= Bristol Packers =

British American football team

The Bristol Packers was a British American football team which existed during the late 1980s and early 1990s in the city of Bristol, England. They played the majority of their home games at Cribbs Causeway, the home of Clifton Rugby Football Club, and also played some home games at Whitchurch Sports Stadium, St Bernadette's Rugby Club and Keynsham Rugby Club. The team folded at the end of the 1991 season after failing to record a single win that year, and suffered the death of a player on the field.

== History ==
The team were formed after the Bristol Bombers folded in 1986. The team was owned and initialised by the late Mike Wilkinson. The Packers ended their first season in 1987 with a 10-0 record in the Budweiser League. only losing to Aston Oilers 7-6 in the semi finals, Division One South-Western Conference, taking the conference championship. Their first season was to be the highlight of the team's existence, and a rapid decline culminated in the team ending its fifth, and final, season without a single win. The Packers ended their brief existence after the 1991 season when the club folded. This final season was also marred by the death on the field of Fullback Ronnie Barnes during a game with the London Ravens. His shirt number, #33, has been retired by all American football teams in Bristol in his honour.

The team's overall record in league and playoff games was 26-27-1.

This period of the late 1980s and early 1990s was the peak of popularity of American football in the United Kingdom, and in Bristol in particular. Over this time a total of six teams played in Bristol, each competing with the others for spectators and players, making it difficult for any of the teams to thrive. The six teams were the Packers and Bombers, as well as the Bristol Pirates and Bristol Blackhawks which both folded in the early 90s. The Bristol Aztecs and Bristol Bullets have lasted into the 21st century, and are both still active, along with the formation of the Bristol Barracuda who entered the BUAFL in 2007-2008 season.

There was a Bristol Packers club shop in the St Pauls area of Bristol, which sold club merchandise.

== Colours ==
The team played in green and gold uniforms, the same colours as their namesakes the Green Bay Packers.

== League record ==
Season	Division	Record
1987	Budweiser League Division 1, South-Western Conference	10-0
1988	Budweiser League Premier Division, South-Western Conference	8-2
1989	Budweiser League South-Western Conference	2-8
1990	NDMA Southern Conference	4-6
1991	NDMA First Division, Southern Conference	0-9-1
