= Old Bristolians RFC =

English rugby union club, based in Somerset

(England) Old Bristolians RFC
- Full name: Old Bristolians Rugby Football Club
- Union: Gloucestershire RFU, Somerset RFU
- Nickname: OBs
- Founded: 1915; 111 years ago
- Location: Failand, Somerset, England
- Ground: Old Bristolians Sports Club
- Chairman: Tristan Fowler
- President: Rich Berry
- Coach: (England) Simon Hunt
- League: Counties 1 Western North
- 2024–25: 3rd

Official website
- www.pitchero.com/clubs/oldbristolians

Old Bristolians Rugby Football Club is an English amateur rugby union club founded in 1915 and based in Failand, North Somerset. The first team play in Counties 1 Western North. They are a member of the Bristol and District Rugby Football Combination, an organisation which promotes junior rugby union in the city of Bristol.

== History ==
Old Bristolians is the rugby club associated with Bristol Grammar School (BGS), but now predominantly made up of players and members who are not BGS alumni.

In 2009–10 OBs won and were promoted from Gloucester 1, and also won the Bristol Combination Cup. In 2011–12 OBs then were promoted from Gloucester Premier to Tribute Western Counties North, again winning the Combination Cup, and finished mid-table in 2013 to 2017.

OBs second team won their league in 2009–10, and again in 2011 and currently play in Tribute Somerset 2 North.

OBs third team is in Tribute Somerset 3 North.

Bristol Grammar School (BGS) was founded in 1532 by two brothers, Robert and Nicholas Thorne, when it was housed in the St Bartholomew's Hospital, as part of the new founding of schools after Henry VIII's closure of the monasteries, where previously a large proportion of England's education had occurred. The school motto Ex Spinis Uvas, which translates as "From Thorns Grapes", is a play upon the names of the school founders Robert and Nicholas Thorne.

== Honours ==
- Bristol Combination Cup winners: 1974–75
- Gloucester 1 champions (2): 2002–03, 2009–10
- Bristol Combination Vase winners (4): 2009–10, 2011–12, 2015–16, 2017–18
- Gloucester Premier champions 2011–12

== Officials ==
President : Rich Berry

Chairman : Tristan Fowler

Hon Secretary : Ben Bagnall

Hon Treasurer : Robert Davies

Ladies' Rugby : Aimee Kelly

Director of Rugby Simon Hunt (rugby union)
