= Derek Neate =

English footballer

Personal information
- Full name: Derek George Stanbridge Neate
- Date of birth: 1 October 1927
- Place of birth: Uxbridge, England
- Date of death: October 2014 (aged 86–87)
- Place of death: West Sussex, England
- Height: 5 ft 8 in (1.73 m)
- Position: Winger

Senior career*
Years	Team	Apps	(Gls)
1947–1956	Hayes		
1956–1959	Brighton & Hove Albion	24	(6)
1959–1962	Bognor Regis Town		

Managerial career
- 1959–1962: Bognor Regis Town (player-manager)
- 1964–1966: Southwick
- 1967–1968: Worthing
- 1968–19??: Steyning Town
- * Club domestic league appearances and goals

Derek George Stanbridge Neate (1 October 1927 – October 2014) was an English professional footballer who played as a winger in the Football League for Brighton & Hove Albion.

== Life and career ==
Neate was born in 1927 in Uxbridge, Middlesex. He began playing football as an amateur for Hayes in 1947. A winger known for his pace, Neate was under consideration to represent Great Britain at the 1948 London Olympics as a sprinter, but an appearance in the Powderhall Sprint, a race with a cash prize, had deprived him of his amateur status and therefore his eligibility. He continued as a regular in the Hayes team until a broken leg suffered in May 1952 deprived him not only of a whole season's football but also of possible selection for the Great Britain football team at the 1952 Olympics. He gained weight and lost confidence while out injured, and found it difficult to re-establish himself in the side. He then suffered burst blood vessels in a leg and other health issues, and was advised to retire, but by late 1955 his form and fitness had returned.

Towards the end of the 1955–56 season, Neate turned professional with Brighton & Hove Albion. He made his debut in a 1–1 draw with promotion rivals Leyton Orient, a match that Albion needed to win, and by the end of the following season had made 28 appearances in the Third Division South and scored six goals. He stayed with the club for a further two years, but Denis Foreman and Frankie Howard kept him out of the first team. He settled in Lancing, West Sussex, and spent three years as player-manager of County League club Bognor Regis Town, and also managed Southwick, Worthing and Steyning Town, before retiring from the game.

Neate died in West Sussex in 2014 at the age of 87.
