= James Phillips (rugby union) =

English rugby union player

- Born: James Phillips; 27 September 1987 (age 39) Bristol, England
- Height: 1.93 m (6 ft 4 in)
- Weight: 121 kg (19 st 1 lb)
- School: Colston's School; St. Brendan's Sixth Form College

Rugby union career
- Position(s): Number Eight, Flanker, second row
Amateur team(s)
| Years | Team | Apps | (Points) |
- Cleve RFC
Senior career
| Years | Team | Apps | (Points) |
| 2006–2010 | Bristol | 82 | (60) |
| 2010–2014 | Exeter Chiefs | 49 | (35) |
| 2014–2015 | London Scottish | 26 | (25) |
| 2015–2016 | Bristol | 29 | (20) |
| 2016–2017 | Bath | 17 | (5) |
| 2018– | Sale Sharks | 0 | (0) |
International career
| Years | Team | Apps | (Points) |
- England U16s
| – | England U18s | | |

James Phillips (born 27 September 1987 in England) is a rugby union player for Sale Sharks in the Aviva Premiership. He plays as a back row or second row.

Phillips made his professional debut for Bristol against Sale Sharks in the 2007/08 season and has represented England at U16s and U18s level.

In January 2010, he extended his contract with Bristol. However, he signed for Exeter in June 2010, following Bristol's loss (to Exeter) in the Championship final. He re-signed for Bristol in 2015, and helped them win promotion to the Aviva Premiership in May 2016. Phillips chose to leave during the 2017-18 close season to join Bath.

On 15 March 2018, Phillips signed for Premiership rivals Sale Sharks on a two-year contract from the 2018–19 season.
