= Frankie Howard (footballer) =

English footballer

Personal information
- Full name: Francis Henry Howard
- Date of birth: 30 January 1931
- Place of birth: Acton, England
- Date of death: 11 October 2007 (aged 76)
- Place of death: Brighton, England
- Height: 5 ft 6 in (1.68 m)
- Position: Outside left

Senior career*
Years	Team	Apps	(Gls)
19??–1950	Guildford City		
1950–1959	Brighton & Hove Albion	200	(26)
- * Club domestic league appearances and goals

Francis Henry Howard (30 January 1931 – 11 October 2007) was an English professional footballer who scored 26 goals from 200 Football League appearances playing at outside left for Brighton & Hove Albion.

== Life and career ==
Howard was born in 1931 in Acton, Middlesex. A pacy left winger who had been a sprinter in his youth, Howard joined Brighton & Hove Albion from Guildford City in 1950. By the mid-1950s, he had established himself in the team, partnering Denis Foreman on the left of the attack, and in the 1957–58 season, he missed only five matches as Albion were promoted to the Second Division. Knee ligaments torn nine months later forced his retirement. He remained on the club staff as groundsman for nearly 30 years. Howard died in Brighton in 2007 at the age of 76.
