= Dings Crusaders RFC =

English rugby union club, based in Bristol

(England) Dings Crusaders
- Full name: Dings Crusaders Rugby Football Club
- Union: Gloucestershire RFU
- Founded: 1897; 129 years ago
- Location: Frenchay, Bristol, England
- Ground: Shaftesbury Park (Capacity: 2,250 (250 seats))
- Captain: (England) George Boulton
- League: National League 1
- 2025–26: 10th
Team kit

Official website
- dingscrusadersrfc

Dings Crusaders RFC is an English rugby union team based in the Bristol suburb of Frenchay having previously been based in Lockleaze up until 2018. The club was relegated from National Division Two South, the fourth tier of the English rugby union system in 2015, to the South West Premier The club are currently playing in the third tier of the English rugby union system, National League 1, following their promotion as champions of the 2023–24 National League 2 West.

Dings is one of the oldest clubs in Bristol, with its roots in a slum area of Bristol stretching back over 110 years. The club is entirely amateur, as opposed to the semi-professional structure of other clubs. The mantra "we don't play for personal gain" is a poignant line in the club's anthem, being very much a part of the community of Lockleaze it is not uncommon to find that some players in the teams today are third generation Dings players.

== Current standings ==
2026–27 National League 1 table
Pos	Team	Pld	W	D	L	PF	PA	PD	TB	LB	Pts	Qualification
1	Plymouth Albion	9	9	0	0	471	151	+320	9	0	45	Promotion place
2	Tonbridge Juddians	9	8	0	1	368	316	+52	9	0	41	Promotion play-off
3	Camborne	9	8	0	1	378	272	+106	8	0	40	Promotion play-off
4	Leeds Tykes	9	6	0	3	324	239	+85	7	3	34	
5	Sale FC	9	6	0	3	375	264	+111	7	2	33	
6	Rosslyn Park	9	5	0	4	343	287	+56	8	1	29	
7	London Scottish	9	4	0	5	330	344	−14	7	2	25	
8	Birmingham Moseley	9	4	0	5	249	312	−63	6	1	23	
9	Bishop's Stortford	9	3	0	6	322	362	−40	8	2	22	
10	Dings Crusaders	9	2	1	6	331	393	−62	8	3	21	
11	Bury St Edmunds	9	3	0	6	237	354	−117	6	0	18	Relegation play-off
12	Rams	9	2	1	6	229	304	−75	6	2	18	Relegation place
13	Sheffield	9	2	0	7	228	334	−106	6	3	17	Relegation place
14	Cambridge	9	0	0	9	240	493	−253	5	3	8	Relegation place

Updated to match(es) played on 7 November 2026. Source: National League Rugby
Rules for classification: If teams are level at any stage, tiebreakers are applied in the following order:
1. Number of matches won
2. Number of matches drawn
3. Difference between points for and against
4. Total number of points for
5. Aggregate number of points scored in matches between tied teams
6. Number of matches won excluding the first match, then the second and so on until the tie is settled

== History ==
The Dings was a slum area of Bristol located between Barton Hill and Temple Meads. The Shaftesbury Crusade, a Christian mission in the area, encouraged sporting activity in the Dings. In 1897, H W Rudge founded Dings Crusaders as part of the Dings Boys Club. Dings is one of only two remaining members of the original Bristol Combination set up in 1901, the other being Bristol Saracens. In 1948, Jack Steadman instigated a move to Dings current home in Lockleaze. Since league structure was introduced, Dings gained three promotions between 1996 and 2003 to enter the National League for the first time. The club finished in the relegation places at the end of the 2003–04 season, their first in National Division Three South, but were spared demotion by the demise of Wakefield. Since then, the club has consolidated its position within the league.

In 2014 it was announced that the club would be moving from the 1,500 capacity Lockleaze ground to Shaftesbury Park, which is based on Frenchay Park Road in Frenchay, South Gloucestershire. The new ground will be part of a £8 million sports facility with a main stand/club house, a gym and two court sports hall, eight changing rooms, two full size floodlight pitches including the main pitch which will have an 4G artificial surface, parking for up to 220 cars and multiple junior pitches. Capacity will include 250 seated and up to 2,000 standing, bring the total figure up to approximately 2,250.

On 17 February 2018 after 10 years in the making, Dings finally played their first game at Shaftesbury Park in front of a crowd of around 1,000, defeating Weston-super-Mare 34–26 in a South West Premier league game.

Dings Crusaders finished as National League 2 West champions at the end of the 2023–24 season, taking the title with a game to go. This win would also see Dings promoted to National League 1 - the highest level the club had reached in its league history.

== Honours ==
- Bristol Combination Cup winners (7): 1973–74, 1985–86, 1990–91, 1994–95, 1995–96, 2010–11, 2014–15
- Gloucestershire 1 champions: 1989–90
- Gloucestershire/Somerset champions: 1993–94
- Western Counties champions: 1995–96
- South West Division 2 West champions: 2000–01
- South West Premier champions (2): 2002–03, 2017–18
- National League 2 West: 2023–24

== Club officials ==
President : Raymond Bowden

Vice President : Phillip Knowles

Chairman : Steve Lloyd

General Secretary : Ian Haddrell

Treasurer : James Luck

Membership Secretary : Rob Stevens

Head Coach : Luke Arscott

Director of Rugby : Stean Williams

Club Captain : George Boulton
