= Winscombe R.F.C. =

English rugby union club, based in Somerset

Winscombe RFC
- Full name: Winscombe Rugby Football Club
- Union: Somerset RFU
- Founded: 1962; 64 years ago
- Location: Winscombe, Somerset, England
- Ground: Winscombe Recreation Ground (Capacity: 1,200)
- League: Regional 2 South West
- 2025–26: 7th
| 1st kit | 2nd kit |

Official website
- www.winscomberfc.co.uk

Winscombe RFC is an English amateur rugby club based in the village of Winscombe, Somerset. They play at the Winscombe War Memorial Recreation Ground, also known as The Rec. The club has three senior teams, a veterans side and over 400 children registered to play at mini and junior level, as well as a girls setups with U-18s and U-15s being past reigning National Champions.

== History ==
The club was founded in 1962 by Dai Davies, Taff Watham, Pete Smart, J.A. Jacobs and C.W. Reid, initially with only one team. Originally the club played on Home Field, Woodborough Farm, now known as the Lynch Field, and changed in a nearby lean-to building, behind what was then called the Woodborough Hotel (now the Woodborough Inn). Only one wall of that building now remains, from the showers, and forms the lower wall of the car park behind the pub. The first game took place on 10 November 1963 against a representative XV from Clifton Rugby Football Club, with Winscombe winning by 26–12. The club's first try-scorer, Steve Bridges, eventually went on to become a long serving president, only retiring in 2010. A 2nd XV was added in 1963, and the 3rd XV played its first match in 1967.

In 1968 the club moved to Winscombe War Memorial Ground (51.3098°N 2.8312°W), using a field leased from Sidcot School, now known as the Longfield pitches. They share the clubhouse with Winscombe cricket, hockey, and football clubs. In 2000 the club bought land for two additional pitches, and in 2007 these were named the Blomfield Pitches, in memory of the club's late treasurer, George Blomfield, who had campaigned tirelessly to raise money for the purchase. Further development of the club's facilities continues, with the latest stage being the floodlighting of the main Longfield pitch.

== Honours ==
1st team

- Somerset 2 champions (2): 1996–97, 2002–03
- Somerset 1 champions (2): 2003–04, 2006–07
- Bristol Combination Cyril Parsons Bowl winners: 2012–13
- Tribute Somerset Premier champions: 2016–17

Ladies

- National Girls U18 Champions 2016–17
- National Girls U15 Champions 2016–17
- NC2 South West (Central) Runners up 2023/24
- Bristol Combinations Cup Champion 2023/24
- NC2 South West (South) Champions 2024/25
- Papa John’s Junior Cup Runners Up 2024/25

== Team colours ==
When founded the team played in an all-black strip, and was known as the Somerset All-Blacks, at least by their own players.

== Senior teams ==
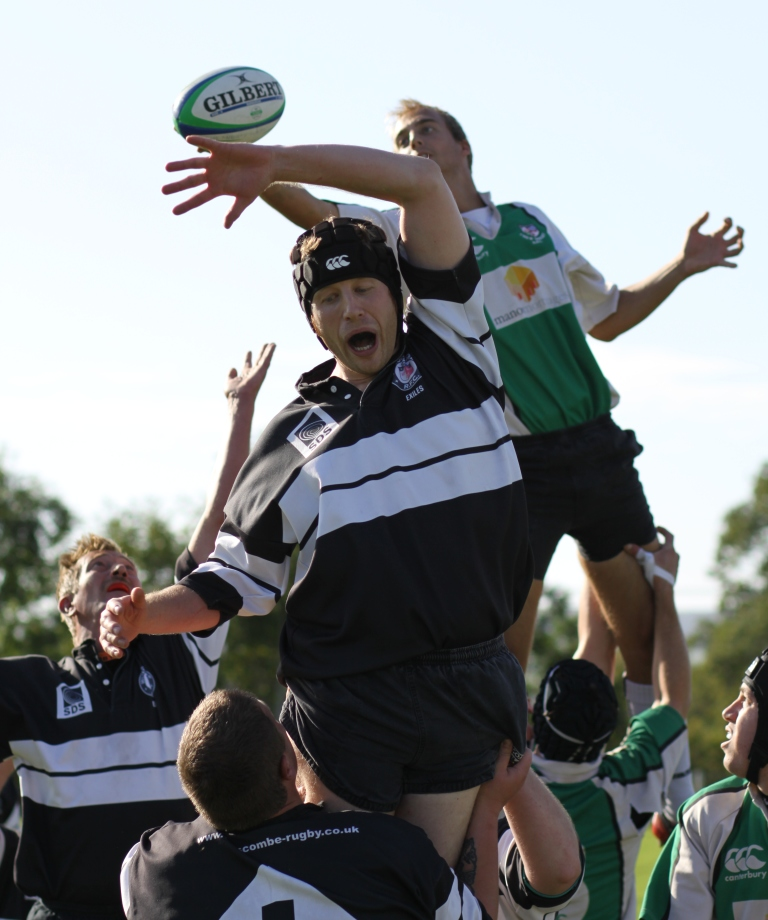
Winscombe 3rd XV in action against Chew Valley 2nd XV, 2009

The number of teams fielded by the club at senior level has fluctuated between two and four, although most recently there have been consistent 1st, 2nd and 3rd XVs. In season 2007–08 the club's 2nd XV entered the Somerset league system, followed by the 3rd XV in 2008–09. For the 2010–11 season, the club will field a 1st XV in Somerset Premier, and a 2nd XV in Somerset 2 North. Due to the advancing age profile of the 3rd XV they have been reconstituted as a Veterans XV and now only play friendly matches, on request. In 2023 the relaunch of the Ladies Section was put into place and they started their league campaign in NC2 rather than the standard NC3. The ladies section was started back up to provide a platform for their successful youth girls section to move into senior rugby.

== Mini and junior teams ==
The Mini and Junior section of the club was formed in 1981 by club stalwart Dave Howells and is now one of the largest Mini and Junior rugby sections in the south-west of England, with over 400 players registered. Players can start from Under 6, where although they are not permitted to play matches by RFU regulations, they are taught the basics of the game. The club fields teams at every age group from Under 6 to Under 17, and Colts (Under 19).

== Ladies and girls rugby ==
Formed under the guidance of Gareth Waterfield, Winscombe now boast a female rugby section (The Winscombe Warriors). They have teams at U18, U15 and U13 level. Formed in 2013 (at U15 level) they now have had players selected for representative and county rugby.

The team were 2013–14 season South West Champions in their inaugural season and have now progressed to National Champions at U15 and U18 levels. The ladies section relaunched in 2023–24 season. The Ladies had instant success winning The Bristol Combinations Cup.

== Rugby festivals ==
Winscombe RFC hosts three annual rugby festivals.

- The Wyvern Cup, a mini rugby competition for Under 8s;
- The North Somerset Schools Tag Tournament, for school years 3/4 and 5/6;
- The Rhino Mendip Sevens, a rugby sevens competition for age groups U13, U14, and U15.
