= Cleve RFC =

English rugby union club, based in Bristol

(England) Cleve RFC
- Full name: Cleve Rugby Football Club
- Union: Gloucestershire RFU
- Founded: 1922; 104 years ago
- Location: Mangotsfield, Gloucestershire, England
- Ground: The Hayfields
- Chairman: (Kenya) Simon Wilstead
- Coach(es): (England) Paul Vinicombe, (England) Harry Casson, (Wales) Matthew Jarvis
- League: Counties 1 Western North
- 2024–25: 1st (promoted to Regional 2 Severn)
1st kit	2nd kit

Official website
- cleverfc.rfu.club

Cleve Rugby Football Club is an English amateur rugby union club founded in 1922 based in Mangotsfield, Bristol. As of 2024, the club's first XV play in the County 1 Tribute North division, in the English rugby union league system. They are a member of the Bristol and District Rugby Football Combination, an organisation which promotes junior rugby union in the city of Bristol.

== History ==
Cleve Rugby Football Club was formed in 1922 as “Cleve RFC Downend”. They played their first game in a field in Staple Hill, which is now Staple Hill Park. The club later moved to Vassells Park in Fishponds, the players changing in the back room of the Full Moon Public House. It was at this time that the club became known simply as “Cleve RFC”. The club purchased a wooden pavilion in November 1934 for £200. When Cleve were forced to move to Bromley Heath Road in Downend in 1939, because of a housing development, their wooden pavilion went with them. In 1947 further land was purchased and was farmed by club members, as a source of income. Eventually, to meet the growing local interest in rugby football, more pitches were developed. Then, between 1969 and 1971, members added more facilities, which carried the club through the next 25 years.

The club badge is based on the coat of arms of the Cave Estate, from whom the ground in Downend was purchased and the ears of wheat acknowledge the club's farming activity after the War. The club motto ‘We sow to reap’ also records these early events but also reflects the club's commitment to providing rugby facilities and coaching for children from the age of 6.

The next milestone in Cleve's history was the club's move to its new clubhouse and grounds in Mangotsfield named ‘The Hayfields’ in September 1997. The club runs two senior sides on Saturdays and all mini and junior levels, from under-7's to colts.

== Honours ==
- Bristol Combination Cup winners (3): 1980, 1983, 1985, 2013
- Gloucester 1 champions: 1994–95
- Western Counties North champions: 2000–01
- South West Division 2 East champions: 2005–06
- South West 1 West champions: 2014–15
- Counties 1 Western North champions: 2024–25

== Coaching staff ==
1st XV : (England) Paul Vinicombe (England)

Colts Coach:

== Club officials ==
President : Howard Owen

Chairman : Simon Wilstead

Vice Chairman :Lee Williams

Director of Rugby Lenrie Sherriffe

Hon Secretary : Steve Bracey

Hon Treasurer : Grev Leigh

Hon Match Secretary : Fred Stapleton

== Notable former players ==
- James Phillips – Exeter Chiefs
- Jack Bates – Bristol
- Chris Brooker – Bristol
- Ryan Davis – London Wasps
- Redford Pennycook – Ealing Trailfinders
- Chevvy Pennycook – Moseley/Bristol
- Jack Tovey – Bristol
- Sam Worsley – Bristol
- John Thorne- Bristol-Gloucestershire- South West Counties- England.
