= Clifton Rugby =

English rugby union club based in Bristol

(England) Clifton RFC
- Full name: Clifton Rugby Football Club
- Union: Gloucestershire RFU
- Nickname: Lavender And Blacks
- Founded: 1872; 154 years ago
- Location: Cribbs Causeway, Bristol, BS10 7TB England
- Ground: Station Road (Capacity: 2,200 (200 seats))
- Chairman: Aftab Hamid
- President: John Raine
- Director of Rugby: Matt Salter
- Coach: Luke Cozens
- Captain: Mitchell Spencer
- League: National League 1
- 2025–26: 12th (relegated to National League 2 West)
Team kit

Official website
- cliftonrugby.co.uk

Clifton Rugby Football Club is an English rugby union club founded in Clifton, Bristol. Over the years the club's home games have been played in a variety of locations in northern Bristol, though never in Clifton itself; since 1976 they have been based at the southern end of Cribbs Causeway. Clifton RFC currently play in National League 2 West in the fourth tier of the English rugby union system following their relegation from the 2025–26 National League 1.

== History ==
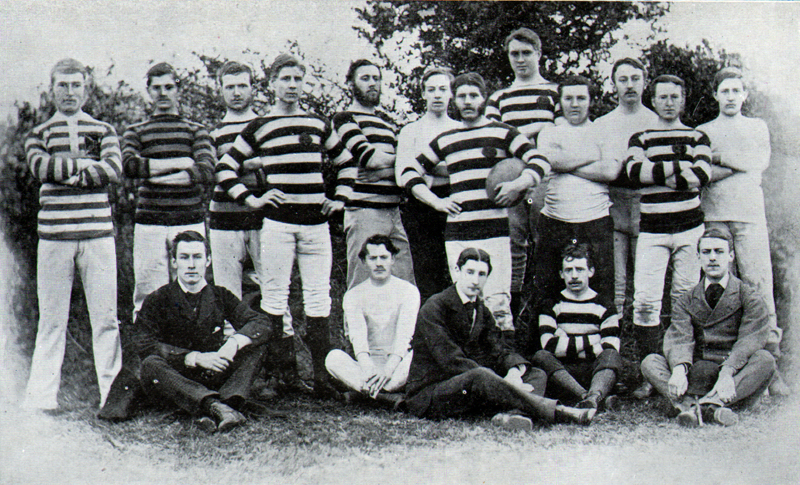
The first ever photograph of a Clifton RFC team (1873)

Clifton RFC is Bristol's oldest club, and one of the oldest in the world. Clifton Rugby Club was formed on 27 September 1872 at the Kings Arms on Blackboy Hill in Clifton, Bristol. The pub still stands, although it was rebuilt in 1902, and refurbished in the late 1990s. Clifton is the 32nd oldest club in the United Kingdom, the 21st oldest in England, the 2nd oldest in the South West (Bath Rugby older by seven years) and the oldest in Bristol. In 1909 a combined Bristol and Clifton RFC team, captained by Percy Down, lost to Australia 11–3.

Clifton's Cribbs Causeway ground also hosted the Bristol Packers American football team in the late 1980s and early 1990s.

== Honours ==
- Bass South West Merit Table champions: 1979–80
- South West Division 1 champions: 1988–89
- Area League South runner-up: 1989–90 (promoted)
- Courage League Division 4 champions: 1993–94
- London 1 v South West 1 promotion play-off winner: 2005–06
- South West Division 1 champions: 2008–09
- Bristol Combination Cup winners (5): 2008–09, 2013–14, 2015–16, 2016–17, 2017–18
- National League 2 West champions: 2024–25

== League table ==
2026–27 National League 2 West table
Pos	Team	Pld	W	D	L	PF	PA	PD	TB	LB	Pts	Qualification
1	Redruth	6	6	0	0	265	121	+144	5	0	29	Promotion place
2	Taunton Titans	6	5	0	1	264	132	+132	5	1	26	Promotion play-off
3	Hinckley	6	5	0	1	253	108	+145	5	0	25	
4	Luctonians	6	5	0	1	198	129	+69	5	0	25	
5	Clifton	6	5	0	1	240	189	+51	5	0	25	
6	Lymm	6	4	0	2	198	202	−4	5	1	22	
7	Old Redcliffians	6	3	0	3	194	188	+6	5	1	18	
8	Cinderford	6	3	0	3	222	250	−28	5	0	17	
9	Loughborough Students	6	2	0	4	197	236	−39	5	1	14	
10	Hornets	6	1	0	5	180	200	−20	4	4	12	
11	Barnstaple	6	2	0	4	139	174	−35	2	1	11	
12	Bournville	6	1	0	5	212	348	−136	5	1	10	Relegation play-off
13	Devonport Services	6	0	0	6	145	294	−149	3	1	4	Relegation place
14	Exeter University	6	0	0	6	140	276	−136	2	0	2	Relegation place

Updated to match(es) played on 5 September 2026. Source: National League Rugby
Rules for classification: If teams are level at any stage, tiebreakers are applied in the following order:
1. Number of matches won
2. Number of matches drawn
3. Difference between points for and against
4. Total number of points for
5. Aggregate number of points scored in matches between tied teams
6. Number of matches won excluding the first match, then the second and so on until the tie is settled

== Notable former players ==
Internationals

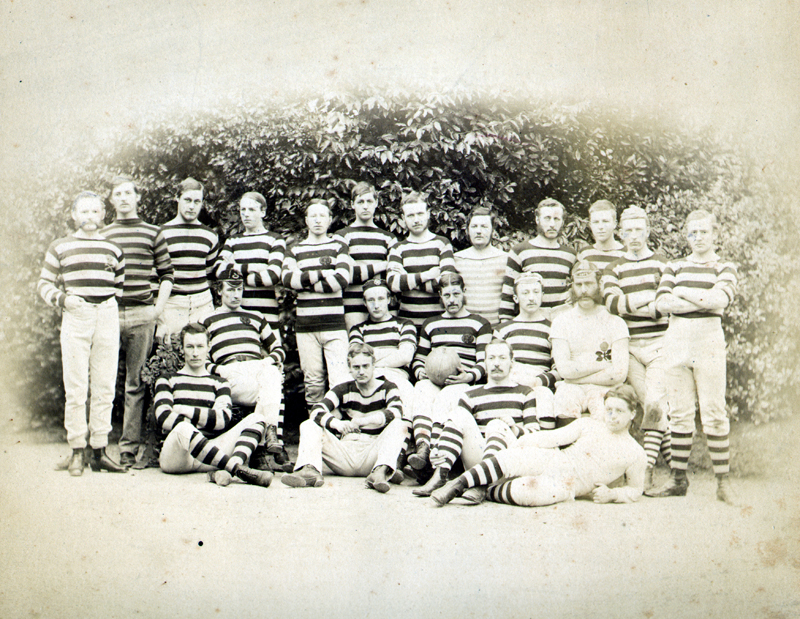
The Clifton RFC team for the 1874–75 season

- Billy Meakes (Australia)
- Ellis Genge (England)
- Callum Braley (Italy)
- Olly Kohn
- Henry Arthur Broomfield
- Rhys Oakley both (Wales)

British & Irish Lions

- Mako Vunipola (England)
- Mark Regan (England)
- Frederick Belson (England)
