= Counties 4 Somerset North =

English rugby union league

- Current season or competition: 2024–25 Counties 4 Somerset North
- Sport: Rugby union
- Instituted: 1987; 39 years ago (as Somerset 2)
- Number of teams: 12
- Country: England
- Most titles: Avonvale, Bath Old Edwardians, Old Redcliffians III, Wells, Winscombe (2 titles)
- Website: englandrugby.com

Counties 4 Somerset North (formerly known as Somerset 2 North or Tribute Somerset 2 North for sponsorship reasons) is an English rugby union league which sits at the tenth level of league rugby union in England alongside its counterpart Somerset 2 South. When the division was founded in 1987 it was a single league known as Somerset 2, but since 2006 it has been split into two regional divisions.

Counties 4 Somerset North currently involves teams from the northern part of Somerset as well as teams based in south and west Bristol. 1st, 2nd and even 3rd XV sides can participate in the division as long as they are not from the same club. The league champions are promoted to Counties 3 Somerset North while relegated teams used to drop to Somerset 3 North but since the RFU Adult Competition Review now drop to local merit leagues.

== Teams 2026–27 ==
Departing were Cheddar Valley (runners-up) promoted to Counties 3 Somerset North. Oldfield Old Boys II were league winners but did not go up.

| Team | Ground | Capacity | Town/Village | Previous season |
|---|---|---|---|---|
| Bristol Barbarians | Norton Lane | | Whitchurch, Bristol | Level transfer from Counties 4 Gloucestershire (South) (11th) |
| Chew Valley III | Chew Lane | | Chew Magna | 4th |
| Frome III | Gypsy Lane | | Frome, Somerset | 6th |
| Imperial II | South Bristol Sports Centre | | Hengrove, Bristol | 9th |
| Keynsham III | Bristol Road | | Keynsham | 7th |
| Midsomer Norton III | Norton Down Playing Fields | | Midsomer Norton | 10th |
| Nailsea & Backwell III | West End Park | | Nailsea, Somerset | 3rd |
| Oldfield Old Boys II | Shaft Road | | Monkton Combe, Bath | Champions (not promoted) |
| Yatton II | The Park | | Yatton | 5th |
| Walcott II | Albert Field | | Lansdown, Bath | 8th |

Locations of the 2026–27 Counties 4 Somerset North teams

== Teams 2025–26 ==
Departing were Bristol Telephone Area (runners-up) promoted to Counties 3 Somerset North. Yatton II were league winners but could not be promoted as Yatton were already in the league above.

St Bernadettes Old Boys II (4th) did not return for the new season.

Wells II (8th) moved on a level transfer back to Counties 4 Somerset South.

Chew Valley III had been promoted to Counties 3 Somerset North for season 2024–25 but withdrew and re-entered the leagues at the bottom of the pyramid. Oldfield Old Boys II also withdrew from Counties 3 Somerset North in 2024–25 and similarly re-joined the leagues a level below.

| Team | Ground | Capacity | Town/Village | Previous season |
|---|---|---|---|---|
| Cheddar Valley | Sharpham Road | | Cheddar | Relegated from Counties 3 Somerset South |
| Chew Valley III | Chew Lane | | Chew Magna | Re-entry |
| Frome III | Gypsy Lane | | Frome, Somerset | 7th |
| Imperial II | South Bristol Sports Centre | | Hengrove, Bristol | New entry |
| Keynsham III | Bristol Road | | Keynsham | 5th |
| Midsomer Norton III | Norton Down Playing Fields | | Midsomer Norton | 3rd |
| Nailsea & Backwell III | West End Park | | Nailsea, Somerset | 6th |
| Oldfield Old Boys II | Shaft Road | | Monkton Combe, Bath | Re-entry |
| Yatton II | The Park | | Yatton | Champions (not promoted) |
| Walcott II | Albert Field | | Lansdown, Bath | Relegated from Counties 3 Somerset North |

Locations of the 2025–26 Counties 4 Somerset North teams

== Teams 2024–25 ==
Departing were Chew Valley III (champions) and Walcot II (3rd), promoted to Counties 3 Somerset North. Keynsham III were runners-up but could not be promoted as Keynsham II were already in the league above.

Joining were Yatton II and Wells II.

| Team | Ground | Capacity | Town/Village | Previous season |
|---|---|---|---|---|
| Bristol Telephone Area | BTRA Sports Ground | | Stockwood, Bristol | 4th |
| Frome III | Gypsy Lane | | Frome, Somerset | 8th |
| Keynsham III | Bristol Road | | Keynsham | 2nd |
| Midsomer Norton III | Norton Down Playing Fields | | Midsomer Norton | 5th |
| Nailsea & Backwell III | West End Park | | Nailsea, Somerset | 6th |
| St Bernadettes Old Boys II | Whitchurch Sports Ground | | Whitchurch, Bristol | 7th |
| Yatton II | The Park | | Yatton | Level transfer from Counties 4 Somerset South (7th) |
| Wells II | Charter Way | | Wells, Somerset | Level transfer from Counties 4 Somerset South (5th) |

Locations of the 2024–25 Counties 4 Somerset North teams

== Teams 2023–24 ==
Departing were Old Redcliffians III and Imperial II, promoted to Counties 3 Somerset North.

Joining were Bristol Telephone Area, relegated from Counties 3 Somerset North.

With two leaving and only one joining the league was reduced in size from nine clubs to eight.

| Team | Ground | Capacity | Town/Village | Previous season |
|---|---|---|---|---|
| Bristol Telephone Area | BTRA Sports Ground | | Stockwood, Bristol | Relegated from Counties 3 Somerset North (12th) |
| Chew Valley III | Chew Lane | | Chew Magna | 6th |
| Frome III | Gypsy Lane | | Frome, Somerset | 8th |
| Keynsham III | Bristol Road | | Keynsham | 3rd |
| Midsomer Norton III | Norton Down Playing Fields | | Midsomer Norton | 7th |
| Nailsea & Backwell III | West End Park | | Nailsea, Somerset | 9th |
| St Bernadettes Old Boys II | Whitchurch Sports Ground | | Whitchurch, Bristol | 5th |
| Walcott II | Albert Field | | Lansdown, Bath | 4th |

Locations of the 2023–24 Counties 4 Somerset North teams

== Teams 2022–23 ==
This was the first season following the RFU Adult Competition Review.

Departing were Gordano II (champions), Clevedon II (3rd), Oldfield Old Boys (4th) and Bristol Telephone Area (7th) to Counties 3 Somerset North whilst Hornets III (runners-up) were promoted to Counties 3 Somerset South.

Also leaving were Weston-super-Mare III (6th) and Yatton (9th) who went on a level transfer to Counties 4 Somerset South.

Bristol Barbarians (5th) moved on a level transfer to Counties 4 Gloucestershire.

| Team | Ground | Capacity | Town/Village | Previous season |
|---|---|---|---|---|
| Chew Valley III | Chew Lane | | Chew Magna | Promoted from Somerset 3 North (5th) |
| Frome III | Gypsy Lane | | Frome, Somerset | Promoted from Somerset 3 South (runners-up) |
| Imperial II | South Bristol Sports Centre | | Hengrove, Bristol | Promoted from Somerset 3 North (runners-up) |
| Keynsham III | Bristol Road | | Keynsham | Promoted from Somerset 3 North (champions) |
| Midsomer Norton III | Norton Down Playing Fields | | Midsomer Norton | Promoted from Somerset 3 South (4th) |
| Nailsea & Backwell III | West End Park | | Nailsea, Somerset | Promoted from Somerset 3 North (3rd) |
| Old Redcliffians III | Scotland Lane | 1,000 | Brislington, Bristol | 8th |
| St Bernadettes Old Boys II | Whitchurch Sports Ground | | Whitchurch, Bristol | Promoted from Somerset 3 North (4th) |
| Walcott II | Albert Field | | Lansdown, Bath | 10th |

Locations of the 2022–23 Counties 4 Somerset North teams
Locations of the 2022–23 Counties 4 Somerset North teams in Bristol

== Teams 2021–22 ==
Winscombe II, who finished 6th in 2019–20, were level transferred to Somerset 2 South for the 2021–22 season.

| Team | Ground | Capacity | Town/Village | Previous season |
|---|---|---|---|---|
| Bristol Barbarians | Norton Lane | | Whitchurch, Bristol | 9th |
| Bristol Telephone Area | BTRA Sports Ground | | Stockwood, Bristol | 3rd |
| Clevedon II | Coleridge Vale Playing Fields | | Clevedon | 12th |
| Gordano II | Caswell Lane | | Portbury | 2nd |
| Hornets III | Hutton Moor Park | 1,100 (100 stand) | Weston-super-Mare | 5th |
| Old Redcliffians III | Scotland Lane | 1,000 | Brislington, Bristol | 8th |
| Oldfield Old Boys II | Shaft Road | | Monkton Combe, Bath | 4th |
| Walcott II | Albert Field | | Lansdown, Bath | 10th |
| Weston-super-Mare III | Recreation Ground | 3,000 | Weston-super-Mare | 11th |
| Yatton II | The Park | | Yatton | 7th |

Locations of the 2021–22 Somerset 2 North teams

== 2020–21 ==
Due to the COVID-19 pandemic, the 2020–21 season was cancelled.

== Teams 2019–20 ==
| Team | Ground | Capacity | Town/Village | Previous season |
|---|---|---|---|---|
| Bristol Barbarians | Norton Lane | | Whitchurch, Bristol | 8th |
| Bristol Telephone Area | BTRA Sports Ground | | Stockwood, Bristol | 4th |
| Clevedon II | Coleridge Vale Playing Fields | | Clevedon | Promoted from Somerset 3 North (champions) |
| Gordano II | Caswell Lane | | Portbury | Runners up |
| Hornets III | Hutton Moor Park | 1,100 (100 stand) | Weston-super-Mare | 10th |
| Nailsea & Backwell II | West End Park | | Nailsea | Promoted from Somerset 3 North (runners up) |
| Old Redcliffians III | Scotland Lane | 1,000 | Brislington, Bristol | 6th |
| Oldfield Old Boys II | Shaft Road | | Monkton Combe, Bath | 7th |
| Walcott II | Albert Field | | Lansdown, Bath | 5th |
| Weston-super-Mare III | Recreation Ground | 3,000 | Weston-super-Mare | 3rd |
| Winscombe II | Recreation Ground | 1,200 | Winscombe | Transfer from Somerset 2 South (runners up) |
| Yatton II | The Park | | Yatton | 9th |

Locations of the 2019–20 Somerset 2 North teams

== Original teams ==
When league rugby began in 1987 this league (known as Somerset 2) was a single division containing the following teams from Somerset and parts of Bristol:

- Avon
- Bath Old Edwardians (Note: Old Boys side for King Edward's School, Bath.)
- Blagdon
- Bristol Harlequins
- Chard
- Cheddar Valley
- Imperial
- St. Bernadette's Old Boys (Note: Old Boys side for St Bernadette Catholic Secondary School.)
- Stothert & Pitt
- Wells
- Winscombe

== Somerset 2 honours ==
=== Somerset 2 (1987–1993) ===
The original Somerset 2 was a tier 10 league with promotion to Somerset 1 and relegation to Somerset 3 (Note: Somerset 3 would briefly split into two divisions – Somerset 3A and 3B – during the 1989–90 season before remerging into a single division.).

Somerset 2
| Season | No of teams | Champions | Runners–up | Relegated team(s) | Ref |
| 1987–88 | 11 | St. Bernadette's Old Boys | Bristol Harlequins | Cheddar Valley, Chard | |
| 1988–89 | 12 | Avonvale | Yeovil | Westland, Wellington | |
| 1989–90 | 11 | Wiveliscombe | Imperial | St. Brendan's Old Boys | |
| 1990–91 | 13 | Stothert & Pitt | Wellington | Bath Old Edwardians, Avon | |
| 1991–92 | 13 | Wells | Imperial (Note: Restructuring of the leagues above Somerset 2 from 11 to 13 teams meant that five clubs were promoted including Yeovil, Westland and Gordano.) | No relegation (Note: Due to the restructuring of the Somerset leagues there was no relegation.) | |
| 1992–93 | 13 | North Petherton | Chard | Burnham-on-Sea, Castle Cary | |
Green backgrounds are promotion places.

=== Somerset 2 (1993–1996) ===
The creation of National League 5 South for the 1993–94 season meant that Somerset 2 dropped to become a tier 11 league. Promotion continued to Somerset 1 and relegation to Somerset 3.

Somerset 2
| Season | No of teams | Champions | Runners–up | Relegated team(s) | Ref |
| 1993–94 | 13 | Tor | Gordano | Avonvale, Bath Saracens | |
| 1994–95 | 13 | Imperial | Stothert & Pitt | Cheddar Valley, Westland | |
| 1995–96 | 13 | Wells | North Petherton (Note: Due to widespread restructuring at the end of the 1995–96 due to the cancellation of National League 5 South, six clubs were promoted including Nailsea & Backwell, Avonvale, Chew Valley and Crewkerne.) | No relegation (Note: Widespread league restructuring meant that there was no relegation.) | |
Green backgrounds are promotion places.

=== Somerset 2 (1996–2000) ===
The cancellation of National League 5 South at the end of the 1995–96 season meant that Somerset 2 reverted to being a tier 10 league. Promotion continued to Somerset 1 and relegation to Somerset 3.

Somerset 2
| Season | No of teams | Champions | Runners–up | Relegated team(s) | Ref |
| 1996–97 | 10 | Winscombe | Blagdon | Bath Old Edwardians, Bath Old Saracens | |
| 1997–98 | 10 | Avon | Old Ashtonian | Crewkerne, Castle Cary | |
| 1998–99 | 10 | Broadplain | Bristol Barbarians | Cheddar Valley, Bath Old Edwardians | |
| 1999–00 | 10 | Avonvale | Minehead Barbarians | No relegation (Note: The cancellation of Somerset 3 at the end of the 1999–00 season meant that there was no relegation.) | |
Green backgrounds are promotion places.

=== Somerset 2 (2000–2006) ===
Somerset 2 remained as a tier 10 league. Promotion continued to Somerset 1, while the cancellation of Somerset 3 at the end of the 1999–00 season meant there was no longer relegation.

Somerset 2
| Season | No of Teams | Champions | Runners–up | Relegated Teams | Ref |
| 2000–01 | 9 | Crewkerne | Burnham-on-Sea | No relegation | |
| 2001–02 | 8 | Bristol Barbarians | Bath Old Edwardians | No relegation | |
| 2002–03 | 8 | Winscombe | Burnham-on-Sea | No relegation | |
| 2003–04 | 7 | Blagdon | Avonvale | No relegation | |
| 2004–05 | 7 | Old Sulians | Martock | No relegation | |
| 2005–06 | 6 | Bath Old Edwardians (Note: Despite finishing as champions Bath Old Edwardians would not be promoted, instead transferring to the new Somerset 2 North division that was introduced for the following season.) | Somerton (Note: Runners up Somerton were promoted to Somerset 1 instead of champions Bath Old Edwardians.) | Multiple teams (Note: The reintroduction of Somerset 3 in the form of Somerset 3 North and Somerset 3 South for the 2006–07 season would see relegation return. Morganians and Castle Cary would drop to Somerset 3 South while Avonvale and Bath Saracens would transfer to Dorset & Wilts 3 West.) | |
Green backgrounds are promotion places.

=== Somerset 2 North (2006–2009) ===
At the start of the 2006–07 Somerset 2 was split into two regional divisions – Somerset 2 North and Somerset 2 South – both remaining at tier 10 of the league system. This restructuring was to enable 2nd XV and 3rd XV sides to play in the Somerset leagues for the first time and would make up most of the teams (Note: In the first season of Somerset 2 North, Bath Old Edwardians were the only 1st XV side – the rest being 2nd XV teams.). Promotion continued to Somerset 1 while relegation was now to Somerset 3 North (Note: Somerset 3 returned for the first time since the 1999–00 season; now split into two regional divisions – Somerset 3 North and Somerset 3 South.). From the 2007–08 season onward the league sponsor would be Tribute.

Somerset 2 North
| Season | No of Teams | Champions | Runners–up | Relegated Teams | Ref |
| 2006–07 | 11 | Keynsham II | Walcot II | Nailsea & Backwell II, Chew Valley II | |
| 2007–08 | 10 | Old Redcliffians II | Clevedon II | No relegation (Note: No relegation as league due to increase from 10 to 12 teams for the following season.) | |
| 2008–09 | 12 | St. Mary's Old Boys II | Midsomer Norton II | Stothert & Pitt II, Gordano II | |
Green backgrounds are promotion places.

=== Somerset 2 North (2009–present) ===
Despite widespread restructuring by the RFU at the end of the 2008–09 season, Somerset 2 North and its counterpart Somerset 2 South, remained as tier 10 leagues. Promotion continued to Somerset 1, while relegation was to Somerset 3 North. The league would continued to be sponsored by Tribute.

Somerset 2 North
| Season | No of Teams | Champions | Runners–up | Relegated Teams | Ref |
| 2009–10 | 13 | Walcot II | Midsomer Norton II | No relegation | |
| 2010–11 | 13 | Clevedon II | Old Redcliffians III | Walcot III, Bath Old Edwardians | |
| 2011–12 | 13 | Old Redcliffians III | Oldfield Old Boys II | No relegation | |
| 2012–13 | 12 | Hornets II | Oldfield Old Boys II | Avon | |
| 2013–14 | 12 | Chew Valley II | Gordano II | Midsomer Norton II | |
| 2014–15 | 14 | Bristol Harlequins II | Old Bristolians II | No relegation | |
| 2015–16 | 14 | Old Redcliffians III (Note: Champions Old Redcliffians III were not promoted.) | Old Bristolians II (Note: Runners up Old Bristolians II promoted instead of champions Old Redcliffians III.) | Nailsea & Backwell II, Keynsham III, Imperial II | |
| 2016–17 | 14 | Bath Old Edwardians | Old Redcliffians III | Old Culverhaysians | |
| 2017–18 | 14 | Cheddar Valley | Weston-super-Mare III | Stothert & Pitt II | |
| 2018–19 | 12 | Midsomer Norton II | Gordano II | Chew Valley III, Wells II | |
| 2019–20 | 12 | Nailsea & Backwell II | Gordano II | No relegation | |
| 2020–21 | | | | | |
Green backgrounds are promotion places.

== Number of league titles ==
- Avonvale (2) (Note: Both of Avonvale's titles were for Somerset 2.)
- Bath Old Edwardians (2) (Note: One of Bath Old Edwardians title was for Somerset 2.)
- Old Redcliffians III (2) (Note: As a club Old Redcliffians have won Somerset 2 North three times – once by the 2nd XV, twice by the 3rd XV.)
- Wells (2) (Note: Both of Wells' titles were for Somerset 2.)
- Winscombe (2) (Note: Both of Winscombe's titles were for Somerset 2.)
- Avon (1) (Note: Avon's title was for Somerset 2.)
- Blagdon (1) (Note: Blagdon's title was for Somerset 2.)
- Bristol Barbarians (1) (Note: Bristol Barbarians title was for Somerset 2.)
- Bristol Harlequins II (1)
- Broadplain (1) (Note: Broadplain's title was for Somerset 2.)
- Cheddar Valley (1)
- Chew Valley II (1)
- Clevedon II (1)
- Crewkerne (1) (Note: Crewkerne's title was for Somerset 2.)
- Hornets II (1)
- Imperial (1) (Note: Imperial's title was for Somerset 2.)
- Keynsham II (1)
- Midsomer Norton II (1)
- Nailsea & Backwell II (1)
- North Petherton (1) (Note: North Petherton's title was for Somerset 2.)
- Old Redcliffians II (1)
- Old Sulians (1) (Note: Old Sulians title was for Somerset 2.)
- St. Bernadette's Old Boys (1) (Note: St. Bernadette's Old Boys title was for Somerset 2.)
- St. Mary's Old Boys II (1)
- Stothert & Pitt (Note: Stothert & Pitt's title was for Somerset 2.)
- Tor (1) (Note: Tor's title was for Somerset 2.)
- Walcot II (1)
- Wiveliscombe (1) (Note: Wiveliscombe's title was for Somerset 2.)

== See also ==
- South West Division RFU
- Somerset RFU
- Somerset Premier
- Somerset 1
- Somerset 2 South
- Somerset 3 North
- Somerset 3 South
- English rugby union system
- Rugby union in England
