= Counties 4 Somerset South =

English rugby union league

- Current season or competition: 2024–25 Counties 4 Somerset South
- Sport: Rugby union
- Instituted: 1987; 39 years ago (as Somerset 2)
- Number of teams: 10
- Country: England
- Most titles: Avonvale, Castle Cary, Morganians, Wells, Winscombe (2 titles)
- Website: englandrugby.com

Counties 4 Somerset South (formerly known as Somerset 2 South or Tribute Somerset 2 South for sponsorship reasons) is an English rugby union league which sits at the tenth level of league rugby union in England alongside its counterpart Counties 4 Somerset North. When the division was founded in 1987 it was a single league known as Somerset 2, but since 2006 it has been split into two regional divisions.

1st, 2nd and even 3rd XV sides can participate in the division as long as they are not from the same club. The league champions are promoted to Counties 3 Somerset South while relegated teams used to drop to Somerset 3 South but since the RFU Adult Competition Review they instead now join county merit leagues.

== Teams 2026–27 ==
Departing were Burnham-on-Sea II (champions) and Somerton (runners-up), both promoted to Counties 3 Somerset South.

North Petherton III were originally allocated to the league but withdrew before the season began.

Team	Ground	Capacity	Town/Village	Previous season
Bridgwater & Albion III	Bath Road	5,000	Bridgwater, Somerset	8th
Crewkerne	Henhayes Recreation Ground		Crewkerne	Relegated from Counties 3 Somerset South
Hornets IV	Hutton Moor Park		Weston-super-Mare	Re-entry
Minehead Barbarians II	The Tom Stewart Field		Minehead	4th
Morganians	Chedzoy Lane		Bridgwater	3rd
Tor II	Brian Harbinson Memorial Park		Glastonbury, Somerset	9th
Wellington II	Athletic Ground		Wellington	Relegated from Counties 3 Somerset South
Wells II	Charter Way		Wells	5th
Weston-super-Mare III	Recreation Ground		Weston-super-Mare, Somerset	6th
Wincanton	Wincanton Sports Ground		Wincanton, Somerset	7th
Yeovil II	Yeovil Showground		Yeovil	10th

Locations of the 2026–27 Counties 4 Somerset South teams

== Teams 2025–26 ==
Departing were Wiveliscombe II (champions) and Martock (runners-up), both promoted to Counties 3 Somerset South.

North Petherton III were originally placed in the league but subsequently withdrew. Subsequently Hornets IV (10th in 2024–25) also withdrew leaving ten clubs to contest the outstanding fixtures.

Team	Ground	Capacity	Town/Village	Previous season
Bridgwater & Albion III	Bath Road	5,000	Bridgwater, Somerset	9th
Burnham-on-Sea II	BASC Ground		Burnham-on-Sea	3rd
Minehead Barbarians II	The Tom Stewart Field		Minehead	4th
Morganians	Chedzoy Lane		Bridgwater	8th
Somerton	Gasson's Lane		Somerton	Relegated from Counties 3 Somerset South
Tor II	Brian Harbinson Memorial Park		Glastonbury, Somerset	7th
Wells II	Charter Way		Wells	Level transfer from Counties 4 Somerset North (8th)
Weston-super-Mare III	Recreation Ground		Weston-super-Mare, Somerset	5th
Wincanton	Wincanton Sports Ground		Wincanton, Somerset	Re-entry
Yeovil II	Yeovil Showground		Yeovil	6th

Locations of the 2025–26 Counties 4 Somerset South teams

== Teams 2024–25 ==
Departing were Wyvern (champions), promoted to Counties 3 Somerset South. Wells II (5th) and Yatton II (7th) moved on a level transfer to Counties 4 Somerset North.

Joining were Bridgwater & Albion III, Burnham-on-Sea II and Wiveliscombe II.

Team	Ground	Capacity	Town/Village	Previous season
Bridgwater & Albion III	Bath Road	5,000	Bridgwater, Somerset	
Burnham-on-Sea II	BASC Ground		Burnham-on-Sea	
Hornets IV	Hutton Moor Park		Weston-super-Mare	4th
Martock	The Recreation Ground		Martock	3rd
Minehead Barbarians II	The Tom Stewart Field		Minehead	6th
Morganians	Chedzoy Lane		Bridgwater	2nd
Tor II	Brian Harbinson Memorial Park		Glastonbury, Somerset	10th
Weston-super-Mare III	Recreation Ground		Weston-super-Mare, Somerset	8th
Wiveliscombe II	Recreational Ground		Wiveliscombe	
Yeovil II	Yeovil Showground		Yeovil	9th

Locations of the 2024–25 Counties 4 Somerset South teams

== Teams 2023–24 ==
Departing were Burnham-on-Sea II, Cheddar Valley and Crewkerne, promoted to Counties 3 Somerset South. Wincanton (9th) were relegated.

Joining were Hornets IV, Morganians, Wells II, Wyvern and Yeovil II.

Team	Ground	Capacity	Town/Village	Previous season
Hornets IV	Hutton Moor Park		Weston-super-Mare	Promoted from Merit Leagues
Martock	The Recreation Ground		Martock	7th
Minehead Barbarians II	The Tom Stewart Field		Minehead	8th
Morganians	Chedzoy Lane		Bridgwater	Promoted from Merit Leagues
Tor II	Brian Harbinson Memorial Park		Glastonbury, Somerset	6th
Wells II	Charter Way		Wells	Relegated from Counties 3 Somerset South
Weston-super-Mare III	Recreation Ground		Weston-super-Mare, Somerset	4th
Wyvern	Mountfields road		Taunton	Promoted from Merit Leagues
Yatton II	The Park		Yatton, Somerset	5th
Yeovil II	Yeovil Showground		Yeovil	Promoted from Merit Leagues

Locations of the 2023–24 Counties 4 Somerset South teams

== Teams 2022–23 ==
This was the first season following the RFU Adult Competition Review.

Departing were Chard, Wiveliscombe II, Somerton, Wells II and Castle Cary (1st – 5th in that order) all promoted to Counties 3 Somerset South. Yeovil II (6th), Winscombe II (7th) and Wyvern (10th) did not return for the new season.

Team	Ground	Capacity	Town/Village	Previous season
Burnham-on-Sea II	BASC Ground		Burnham-on-Sea	8th
Cheddar Valley II	Sharpham Road		Cheddar	11th
Crewkerne	Henhayes Recreation Ground		Crewkerne	Relegated from Somerset Premier (14h)
Martock	The Recreation Ground		Martock	12th
Minehead Barbarians II	The Tom Stewart Field		Minehead	9th
Tor II	Brian Harbinson Memorial Park		Glastonbury, Somerset	Promoted from Somerset 3 South
Weston-super-Mare III	Recreation Ground		Weston-super-Mare, Somerset	Level transfer from Counties 4 Somerset North (6th)
Wincanton	Wincanton Sports Ground		Wincanton, Somerset	Promoted from Somerset 3 South
Yatton II	The Park		Yatton, Somerset	Level transfer from Counties 4 Somerset North (9th)

Locations of the 2022–23 Counties 4 Somerset South teams

== Teams 2021–22 ==
Team	Ground	Capacity	Town/Village	Previous season
Burnham-on-Sea II	BASC Ground		Burnham-on-Sea	9th
Castle Cary	Brook House Field		Castle Cary	7th
Chard II	The Park, Essex Close		Chard	4th
Cheddar Valley II	Sharpham Road		Cheddar	Promoted from Somerset 3 South (Champions)
Martock	The Recreation Ground		Martock	Promoted from Somerset 3 South (runners-up)
Minehead Barbarians II	The Tom Stewart Field		Minehead	8th
Somerton	Gasson's Lane		Somerton	2nd
Wells II	Charter Way		Wells	5th
Winscombe II	Recreation Ground	1,200	Winscombe	Transfer from Somerset 2 North (6th)
Wiveliscombe II	Recreational Ground		Wiveliscombe	3rd
Wyvern	Mountfields road		Taunton	6th
Yeovil II	Yeovil Showground		Yeovil	10th

Locations of the 2021–22 Somerset 2 South teams

== 2020–21 ==
Due to the COVID-19 pandemic, the 2020–21 season was cancelled.

== Teams 2019–20 ==
Team	Ground	Capacity	Town/Village	Previous season
Burnham-on-Sea II	BASC Ground		Burnham-on-Sea	9th
Castle Cary	Brook House Field		Castle Cary	Relegated from Somerset 1 (12th)
Chard II	The Park, Essex Close		Chard	5th
Minehead Barbarians II	The Tom Stewart Field		Minehead	7th
Morganians	Chedzoy Lane		Bridgwater	3rd
Somerton	Gasson's Lane		Somerton	6th
Wells II	Charter Way		Wells	Transfer from Somerset 2 North (11th)
Wiveliscombe II	Recreational Ground		Wiveliscombe	10th
Wyvern	Mountfields road		Taunton	Promoted from Somerset 3 South (runners up)
Yeovil II	Yeovil Showground		Yeovil	4th

Locations of the 2019–20 Somerset 2 South teams

== Original teams ==
When league rugby began in 1987 this league (known as Somerset 2) was a single division containing the following teams from Somerset and parts of Bristol:

- Avon
- Bath Old Edwardians (Note: Old Boys side for King Edward's School, Bath.)
- Blagdon
- Bristol Harlequins
- Chard
- Cheddar Valley
- Imperial
- St. Bernadette's Old Boys (Note: Old Boys side for St Bernadette Catholic Secondary School.)
- Stothert & Pitt
- Wells
- Winscombe

== Somerset 2 honours ==
=== Somerset 2 (1987–1993) ===
The original Somerset 2 was a tier 10 league with promotion to Somerset 1 and relegation to Somerset 3 (Note: Somerset 3 would briefly split into two divisions – Somerset 3A and 3B – during the 1989–90 season before remerging into a single division.).

Somerset 2
Season	No of teams	Champions	Runners–up	Relegated team(s)	Ref
1987–88	11	St. Bernadette's Old Boys	Bristol Harlequins	Cheddar Valley, Chard	
1988–89	12	Avonvale	Yeovil	Westland, Wellington	
1989–90	11	Wiveliscombe	Imperial	St. Brendan's Old Boys	
1990–91	13	Stothert & Pitt	Wellington	Bath Old Edwardians, Avon	
1991–92	13	Wells	Imperial (Note: Restructuring of the leagues above Somerset 2 from 11 to 13 teams meant that five clubs were promoted including Yeovil, Westland and Gordano.)	No relegation (Note: Due to the restructuring of the Somerset leagues there was no relegation.)	
1992–93	13	North Petherton	Chard	Burnham-on-Sea, Castle Cary	
Green backgrounds are promotion places.

=== Somerset 2 (1993–1996) ===
The creation of National League 5 South for the 1993–94 season meant that Somerset 2 dropped to become a tier 11 league. Promotion continued to Somerset 1 and relegation to Somerset 3.

Somerset 2
Season	No of teams	Champions	Runners–up	Relegated team(s)	Ref
1993–94	13	Tor	Gordano	Avonvale, Bath Saracens	
1994–95	13	Imperial	Stothert & Pitt	Cheddar Valley, Westland	
1995–96	13	Wells	North Petherton (Note: Due to widespread restructuring at the end of the 1995–96 due to the cancellation of National League 5 South, six clubs were promoted including Nailsea & Backwell, Avonvale, Chew Valley and Crewkerne.)	No relegation (Note: Widespread league restructuring meant that there was no relegation.)	
Green backgrounds are promotion places.

=== Somerset 2 (1996–2000) ===
The cancellation of National League 5 South at the end of the 1995–96 season meant that Somerset 2 reverted to being a tier 10 league. Promotion continued to Somerset 1 and relegation to Somerset 3.

Somerset 2
Season	No of teams	Champions	Runners–up	Relegated team(s)	Ref
1996–97	10	Winscombe	Blagdon	Bath Old Edwardians, Bath Old Saracens	
1997–98	10	Avon	Old Ashtonian	Crewkerne, Castle Cary	
1998–99	10	Broadplain	Bristol Barbarians	Cheddar Valley, Bath Old Edwardians	
1999–00	10	Avonvale	Minehead Barbarians	No relegation (Note: The cancellation of Somerset 3 at the end of the 1999–00 season meant that there was no relegation.)	
Green backgrounds are promotion places.

=== Somerset 2 (2000–2006) ===
Somerset 2 remained as a tier 10 league. Promotion continued to Somerset 1, while the cancellation of Somerset 3 at the end of the 1999–00 season meant there was no longer relegation.

Somerset 2
Season	No of Teams	Champions	Runners–up	Relegated Teams	Ref
2000–01	9	Crewkerne	Burnham-on-Sea	No relegation	
2001–02	8	Bristol Barbarians	Bath Old Edwardians	No relegation	
2002–03	8	Winscombe	Burnham-on-Sea	No relegation	
2003–04	7	Blagdon	Avonvale	No relegation	
2004–05	7	Old Sulians	Martock	No relegation	
2005–06	6	Bath Old Edwardians (Note: Despite finishing as champions Bath Old Edwardians would not be promoted, instead transferring to the new Somerset 2 North division that was introduced for the following season.)	Somerton (Note: Runners up Somerton were promoted to Somerset 1 instead of champions Bath Old Edwardians.)	Multiple teams (Note: The reintroduction of Somerset 3 in the form of Somerset 3 North and Somerset 3 South for the 2006–07 season would see relegation return. Morganians and Castle Cary would drop to Somerset 3 South while Avonvale and Bath Saracens would transfer to Dorset & Wilts 3 West.)	
Green backgrounds are promotion places.

=== Somerset 2 South (2006–2009) ===
At the start of the 2006–07 Somerset 2 was split into two regional divisions – Somerset 2 North and Somerset 2 South – both remaining at tier 10 of the league system. This restructuring was to enable 2nd XV and 3rd XV sides to play in the Somerset leagues for the first time and would make up most of the teams (Note: In the first season of Somerset 2 North, Bath Old Edwardians were the only 1st XV side – the rest being 2nd XV teams.). Promotion continued to Somerset 1 while relegation was now to Somerset 3 South (Note: Somerset 3 returned for the first time since the 1999–00 season; now split into two regional divisions – Somerset 3 North and Somerset 3 South.). From the 2007–08 season onward the league sponsor would be Tribute.

Somerset 2 South
Season	No of Teams	Champions	Runners–up	Relegated Teams	Ref
2006–07	5	Bridgwater & Albion II	Taunton II	No relegation (Note: No relegation as league due to increase from 5 to 11 teams for the following season.)	
2007–08	11	Taunton II	Weston-super-Mare II	Morganians	
2008–09	11	Weston-super-Mare II	Bridgwater & Albion III	No relegation (Note: No relegation as league due to increase from 11 to 13 teams for the following season.)	
Green backgrounds are promotion places.

=== Somerset 2 South (2009–present) ===
Despite widespread restructuring by the RFU at the end of the 2008–09 season, Somerset 2 South and its counterpart Somerset 2 South remained as tier 10 league. Promotion continued to Somerset 1, while relegation was to Somerset 3 South. The league continued to be sponsored by Tribute.

Somerset 2 South
Season	No. of teams	Champions	Runners–up	Relegated teams	Ref
2009–10	13	Wellington II	Bridgwater & Albion III	No relegation	
2010–11	13	Castle Cary	Wells II	No relegation	
2011–12	13	Chard II	North Petherton II	No relegation	
2012–13	13	Crewkerne	Cheddar Valley	Martock	
2013–14	12	Cheddar Valley	Tor II	No relegation	
2014–15	13	Wyvern	Hornets III	Yeovil II, Wellington	
2015–16	14	Wells II	Hornets III	Frome III	
2016–17	13	Morganians	North Petherton II	Midsomer Norton III	
2017–18	13	Castle Cary	Winscombe II	Tor II	
2018–19	12	Taunton III	Winscombe II	Bridgwater & Albion III, Martock	
2019–20	10	Morganians	Somerton	No relegation	
2020–21					
Green backgrounds are promotion places.

== Number of league titles ==
- Avonvale (2) (Note: Both of Avonvale's titles were for Somerset 2.)
- Castle Cary (2)
- Crewkerne (2) (Note: One of Crewkerne's titles was for Somerset 2.)
- Morganians (2)
- Wells (2) (Note: Both of Wells' titles were for Somerset 2. As a club Wells have actually won three titles – two by the 1st XV, one by the 2nd XV (Somerset 2 South).)
- Winscombe (2) (Note: Both of Winscombe's titles were for Somerset 2.)
- Avon (1) (Note: Avon's title was for Somerset 2.)
- Bath Old Edwardians (1) (Note: Bath Old Edwardians title was for Somerset 2.)
- Blagdon (1) (Note: Blagdon's title was for Somerset 2.)
- Bridgwater & Albion II (1)
- Bristol Barbarians (1) (Note: Bristol Barbarians title was for Somerset 2.)
- Broadplain (1) (Note: Broadplain's title was for Somerset 2.)
- Chard II (1)
- Cheddar Valley (1)
- Imperial (1) (Note: Imperial's title was for Somerset 2.)
- North Petherton (1) (Note: North Petherton's title was for Somerset 2.)
- Old Sulians (1) (Note: Old Sulians title was for Somerset 2.)
- St. Bernadette's Old Boys (1) (Note: St. Bernadette's Old Boys title was for Somerset 2.)
- Stothert & Pitt (Note: Stothert & Pitt's title was for Somerset 2.)
- Taunton II (1) (Note: As a club Taunton have won Somerset 2 South twice – once by the 2nd XV and once by the 3rd XV.)
- Taunton III (1)
- Tor (1) (Note: Tor's title was for Somerset 2.)
- Wellington II (1)
- Wells II (1)
- Weston-super-Mare II (1)
- Wiveliscombe (1) (Note: Wiveliscombe's title was for Somerset 2.)
- Wyvern (1)

== See also ==
- South West Division RFU
- Somerset RFU
- Somerset Premier
- Somerset 1
- Somerset 2 North
- Somerset 3 North
- Somerset 3 South
- English rugby union system
- Rugby union in England
