= Counties 3 Somerset =

English rugby union league

- Current season or competition: 2024–25 Counties 3 Somerset
- Sport: Rugby union
- Instituted: 1987; 39 years ago
- Number of teams: 12
- Country: England
- Most titles: Minehead Barbarians (3 titles)
- Website: englandrugby.com

Counties 3 Somerset (formerly known as Somerset 1 or Tribute Somerset 1 for sponsorship reasons) is an English rugby union league which sits at the ninth level of league rugby union in England involving teams based in the county of Somerset as well as some teams based in Bristol. 1st, 2nd and even 3rd XV sides can participate in the division as long as they are not from the same club.

The league champions and runners up are promoted to Counties 2 Somerset while relegated teams drop to either Counties 4 Somerset North or Counties 4 Somerset South depending on location. Each year clubs in this division also take part in the RFU Junior Vase – a level 9–12 national competition.

== Teams 2026–27 ==
=== North ===
Departing were Yatton, promoted to Counties 2 Somerset. There was no relegation.

| Team | Ground | Capacity | Town/Village | Previous season |
|---|---|---|---|---|
| Bristol Harlequins | Broomhill Road | | Brislington, Bristol | 3rd |
| Bristol Telephone Area | BTRA Sports Ground | | Stockwood, Bristol | 10th |
| Cheddar Valley | Sharpham Road | | Cheddar | Promoted from Counties 4 Somerset North (runners-up) |
| Clevedon II | Coleridge Vale Playing Fields | | Clevedon | 5th |
| Gordano II | Caswell Lane | | Portbury | 4th |
| Keynsham II | Bristol Road | | Keynsham | Relegated from Counties 2 Somerset (9th) |
| Midsomer Norton II | Norton Down Playing Fields | | Midsomer Norton | 7th |
| Nailsea & Backwell II | West End Park | | Nailsea | 6th |
| Old Redcliffians III | Scotland Lane | 1,000 | Brislington, Bristol | 8th |
| Old Sulians | Lansdown Road | | Bath | 2nd |
| Winscombe II | Recreation Ground | | Winscombe, Somerset | 9th |

Locations of the 2026–27 Counties 2 Somerset (North) teams
Locations of the 2026–27 Counties 2 Somerset (North) teams in Bristol

=== South ===
Departing were Wells promoted to Counties 2 Somerset. Also leaving were Wellington II and Crewkerne (10th) relegated to Counties 4 Somerset South.

| Team | Ground | Capacity | Town/Village | Previous season |
|---|---|---|---|---|
| Bridgwater & Albion II | Bath Road | 5,000 | Bridgwater | 4th |
| Burnham-on-Sea II | BASC Ground | | Burnham-on-Sea | Promoted from Counties 4 Somerset South (champions) |
| Castle Cary | Brook House Field | | Castle Cary | Relegated from Counties 2 Somerset |
| Chard II | The Park, Essex Close | | Chard | 6th |
| Hornets III | Hutton Moor Park | 1,100 (100 stand) | Weston-super-Mare | 11th |
| Martock | The Recreation Ground | | Martock | 7th |
| North Petherton II | Beggars Brook | | North Petherton | 8th |
| Somerton | Gasson's Lane | | Somerton | Promoted from Counties 4 Somerset South (runners-up) |
| Tor | Brian Harbinson Memorial Park | | Glastonbury, Somerset | 3rd |
| Weston-super-Mare II | Recreation Ground | 3,000 | Weston-super-Mare, Somerset | 2nd |
| Wiveliscombe II | Recreational Ground | | Wiveliscombe | 9th |
| Wyvern | Mountfields road | | Taunton | 5th |

Locations of the 2026–27 Counties 2 Somerset (South) teams

== Teams 2025–26 ==
=== North ===
Departing were Keynsham II, promoted to Counties 2 Somerset, while Walcott II were relegated to Counties 4 Somerset North.

| Team | Ground | Capacity | Town/Village | Previous season |
|---|---|---|---|---|
| Bristol Harlequins | Broomhill Road | | Brislington, Bristol | 3rd |
| Bristol Telephone Area | BTRA Sports Ground | | Stockwood, Bristol | Promoted from Counties 4 Somerset North |
| Clevedon II | Coleridge Vale Playing Fields | | Clevedon | 8th |
| Gordano II | Caswell Lane | | Portbury | 7th |
| Midsomer Norton II | Norton Down Playing Fields | | Midsomer Norton | Runners-up |
| Nailsea & Backwell II | West End Park | | Nailsea | Relegated from Counties 2 Somerset |
| Old Redcliffians III | Scotland Lane | 1,000 | Brislington, Bristol | 5th |
| Old Sulians | Lansdown Road | | Bath | 6th |
| Winscombe II | Recreation Ground | | Winscombe, Somerset | 9th |
| Yatton | The Park | | Yatton | 4th |

Locations of the 2025–26 Counties 2 Somerset (North) teams
Locations of the 2025–26 Counties 2 Somerset (North) teams in Bristol

=== South ===
Departing were Castle Cary promoted to Counties 2 Somerset while Cheddar Valley (12th) and Somerton (11th) were relegated to Counties 4 Somerset North and Counties 4 Somerset South respectively.

| Team | Ground | Capacity | Town/Village | Previous season |
|---|---|---|---|---|
| Bridgwater & Albion II | Bath Road | 5,000 | Bridgwater | Runners-up |
| Chard II | The Park, Essex Close | | Chard | 10th |
| Crewkerne | Henhayes Recreation Ground | | Crewkerne | 9th |
| Hornets III | Hutton Moor Park | 1,100 (100 stand) | Weston-super-Mare | 8th |
| Martock | The Recreation Ground | | Martock | Promoted from Counties 4 Somerset South (runners-up) |
| North Petherton II | Beggars Brook | | North Petherton | 5th |
| Tor | Brian Harbinson Memorial Park | | Glastonbury, Somerset | 3rd |
| Wellington II | Athletic Ground | | Wellington | 7th |
| Wells | Charter Way | | Wells, Somerset | Relegated from Counties 2 Somerset |
| Weston-super-Mare II | Recreation Ground | 3,000 | Weston-super-Mare, Somerset | 6th |
| Wiveliscombe II | Recreational Ground | | Wiveliscombe | Promoted from Counties 4 Somerset South (champions) |
| Wyvern | Mountfields road | | Taunton | 4th |

Locations of the 2025–26 Counties 2 Somerset (South) teams

== Teams 2024–25 ==
=== North ===
Departing were Nailsea & Backwell II, promoted to Counties 2 Somerset, while Imperial II were relegated.

Joining were Walcott II, Yatton and Chew Valley III.

Chew Valley III (promoted as champions from Counties 4 Somerset North) and Oldfield Old Boys II (10th in 2023–24) both started but did not complete the season meaning the remaining league fixtures were contested by ten sides.

| Team | Ground | Capacity | Town/Village | Previous season |
|---|---|---|---|---|
| Bristol Harlequins | Broomhill Road | | Brislington, Bristol | 3rd |
| Clevedon II | Coleridge Vale Playing Fields | | Clevedon | 9th |
| Gordano II | Caswell Lane | | Portbury | 8th |
| Keynsham II | Bristol Road | | Keynsham | 2nd |
| Midsomer Norton II | Norton Down Playing Fields | | Midsomer Norton | 5th |
| Old Redcliffians III | Scotland Lane | 1,000 | Brislington, Bristol | 7th |
| Old Sulians | Lansdown Road | | Bath | 6th |
| Walcott II | Albert Field | | Lansdown, Bath | Promoted from Counties 4 Somerset North (3rd) |
| Winscombe II | Recreation Ground | | Winscombe, Somerset | 4th |
| Yatton | The Park | | Yatton | Relegated from Counties 2 Somerset |

Locations of the 2024–25 Counties 2 Somerset (North) teams
Locations of the 2024–25 Counties 2 Somerset (North) teams in Bristol

=== South ===
Departing were Burnham-on-Sea II (12th) and Wiveliscombe II (11th) both relegated to Counties 4 Somerset South.

There was no promotion as Hornets II were already in Counties 2 Somerset meaning Hornets III could not compete in the same league.

Joining were Wyvern and Weston-super-Mare II.

| Team | Ground | Capacity | Town/Village | Previous season |
|---|---|---|---|---|
| Bridgwater & Albion II | Bath Road | 5,000 | Bridgwater | 8th |
| Castle Cary | Brook House Field | | Castle Cary | 2nd |
| Chard II | The Park, Essex Close | | Chard | 10th |
| Cheddar Valley | Sharpham Road | | Cheddar | 9th |
| Crewkerne | Henhayes Recreation Ground | | Crewkerne | 5th |
| Hornets III | Hutton Moor Park | 1,100 (100 stand) | Weston-super-Mare | Champions (not promoted) |
| North Petherton II | Beggars Brook | | North Petherton | 3rd |
| Somerton | Gasson's Lane | | Somerton | 6th |
| Tor | Brian Harbinson Memorial Park | | Glastonbury, Somerset | 4th |
| Wellington II | Athletic Ground | | Wellington | 7th |
| Weston-super-Mare II | Recreation Ground | 3,000 | Weston-super-Mare, Somerset | Relegated from Counties 2 Somerset |
| Wyvern | Mountfields road | | Taunton | Promoted from Counties 4 Somerset South |

Locations of the 2024–25 Counties 2 Somerset (South) teams

== Teams 2023–24 ==
=== North ===
Departing were Chew Valley II, promoted to Counties 2 Somerset, while Stothert & Pitt (9th) and Bristol Telephone Area (12th) were relegated.

Joining were Imperial II and Old Redcliffians III..

| Team | Ground | Capacity | Town/Village | Previous season |
|---|---|---|---|---|
| Bristol Harlequins | Broomhill Road | | Brislington, Bristol | 3rd |
| Clevedon II | Coleridge Vale Playing Fields | | Clevedon | 11th |
| Gordano II | Caswell Lane | | Portbury | 6th |
| Imperial II | South Bristol Sports Centre | | Hengrove, Bristol | Promoted from Counties 4 Somerset North (runners-up) |
| Keynsham II | Bristol Road | | Keynsham | 2nd |
| Midsomer Norton II | Norton Down Playing Fields | | Midsomer Norton | 10th |
| Nailsea & Backwell II | West End Park | | Nailsea | 4th |
| Oldfield Old Boys II | Shaft Road | | Monkton Combe, Bath | 8th |
| Old Redcliffians III | Scotland Lane | 1,000 | Brislington, Bristol | Promoted from Counties 4 Somerset North (champions) |
| Old Sulians | Lansdown Road | | Bath | 5th |
| Winscombe II | Recreation Ground | | Winscombe, Somerset | 7th |

Locations of the 2023–24 Counties 2 Somerset (North) teams
Locations of the 2023–24 Counties 2 Somerset (North) teams in Bristol

=== South ===
Departing were Huish Tigers, promoted to Counties 2 Somerset. Wells II (10th) were relegated to Counties 4 Somerset South.

Joining were Burnham-on-Sea II, Cheddar Valley, Crewkerne and Tor.

| Team | Ground | Capacity | Town/Village | Previous season |
|---|---|---|---|---|
| Bridgwater & Albion II | Bath Road | 5,000 | Bridgwater | 9th |
| Burnham-on-Sea II | BASC Ground | | Burnham-on-Sea | Promoted from Counties 4 Somerset South (champions) |
| Castle Cary | Brook House Field | | Castle Cary | 2nd |
| Chard II | The Park, Essex Close | | Chard | 3rd |
| Cheddar Valley | Sharpham Road | | Cheddar | Promoted from Counties 4 Somerset South (3rd) |
| Crewkerne | Henhayes Recreation Ground | | Crewkerne | Promoted from Counties 4 Somerset South (runners-up) |
| Hornets III | Hutton Moor Park | 1,100 (100 stand) | Weston-super-Mare | 4th |
| North Petherton II | Beggars Brook | | North Petherton | 6th |
| Somerton | Gasson's Lane | | Somerton | 5th |
| Tor | Brian Harbinson Memorial Park | | Glastonbury, Somerset | Relegated from Counties 2 Somerset |
| Wellington II | Athletic Ground | | Wellington | 7th |
| Wiveliscombe II | Recreational Ground | | Wiveliscombe | 8th |

Locations of the 2023–24 Counties 2 Somerset (South) teams

== Teams 2022–23 ==
This was the first season following the RFU Adult Competition Review with the league split into North and South divisions.

Departing were Old Redcliffians II, promoted, together with Cheddar Valley (7th) who took a voluntary relegation to Counties 4 Somerset South and Morganians (11th) who withdrew from league competition.

=== North ===
Joining were Bristol Harlequins, Bristol Telephone Area, Clevedon II, Gordano II, Oldfield Old Boys II, Stothert & Pitt and Winscombe II.

| Team | Ground | Capacity | Town/Village | Previous season |
|---|---|---|---|---|
| Bristol Harlequins | Broomhill Road | | Brislington, Bristol | Relegated from Somerset Premier |
| Bristol Telephone Area | BTRA Sports Ground | | Stockwood, Bristol | Promoted from Somerset 2 North (7th) |
| Clevedon II | Coleridge Vale Playing Fields | | Clevedon | Promoted from Somerset 2 North (3rd) |
| Chew Valley II | Chew Lane | | Chew Magna | 2nd |
| Gordano II | Caswell Lane | | Portbury | Promoted from Somerset 2 North (champions) |
| Keynsham II | Bristol Road | | Keynsham | 4th |
| Midsomer Norton II | Norton Down Playing Fields | | Midsomer Norton | 10th |
| Nailsea & Backwell II | West End Park | | Nailsea | 6th |
| Oldfield Old Boys II | Shaft Road | | Monkton Combe, Bath | Promoted from Somerset 2 North (4th |
| Old Sulians | Lansdown Road | | Bath | 3rd |
| Stothert & Pitt | Adams Field | | Corston, Somerset | Relegated from Somerset Premier |
| Winscombe II | Recreation Ground | | Winscombe, Somerset | Promoted from Somerset 2 South (7th) |

{
Locations of the 2022–23 Counties 2 Somerset (North) teams

=== South ===
Joining were Castle Cary, Chard II, Hornets III, Huish Tigers (double promotion), Somerton, Wells II and Wiveliscombe II.

| Team | Ground | Capacity | Town/Village | Previous season |
|---|---|---|---|---|
| Bridgwater & Albion II | Bath Road | 5,000 | Bridgwater | 8th |
| Castle Cary | Brook House Field | | Castle Cary | Promoted from Somerset 2 South (5th) |
| Chard II | The Park, Essex Close | | Chard | Promoted from Somerset 2 South (champions) |
| Hornets III | Hutton Moor Park | 1,100 (100 stand) | Weston-super-Mare | Promoted from Somerset 2 North (runners-up) |
| Huish Tigers | Ash Meadow Park | | Taunton, Somerset | Promoted from Somerset 3 South (champions) |
| North Petherton II | Beggars Brook | | North Petherton | 5th |
| Somerton | Gasson's Lane | | Somerton | Promoted from Somerset 2 South (3rd) |
| Wellington II | Athletic Ground | | Wellington | 9th |
| Wells II | Charter Way | | Wells | Promoted from Somerset 2 South (4th) |
| Wiveliscombe II | Recreational Ground | | Wiveliscombe | Promoted from Somerset 2 South (runners-up) |

Locations of the 2022–23 Counties 2 Somerset (South) teams

== Teams 2021–22 ==
Taunton II (11th in 2019–20) started but did not complete the season leaving eleven sides to contest the remaining fixtures.

| Team | Ground | Capacity | Town/Village | Previous season |
|---|---|---|---|---|
| Bridgwater & Albion II | Bath Road | 5,000 | Bridgwater | 4th |
| Cheddar Valley | Sharpham Road | | Cheddar | 5th |
| Chew Valley II | Chew Lane | | Chew Magna | 3rd |
| Keynsham II | Bristol Road | | Keynsham | 6th |
| Midsomer Norton II | Norton Down Playing Fields | | Midsomer Norton | 9th |
| Morganians | Chedzoy Lane | | Bridgwater | Promoted from Somerset 2 South (champions) |
| Nailsea & Backwell II | West End Park | | Nailsea | Promoted from Somerset 2 North (champions) |
| North Petherton II | Beggars Brook | | North Petherton | 8th |
| Old Redcliffians II | Scotland Lane | 1,000 | Brislington, Bristol | Relegated from Somerset Premier (12th) |
| Old Sulians | Lansdown Road | | Bath | 7th |
| Wellington II | Athletic Ground | | Wellington | 10th |

Locations of the 2021–22 Somerset 1 teams

== 2020–21 ==
Due to the COVID-19 pandemic, the 2020–21 season was cancelled.

== Teams 2019–20 ==
| Team | Ground | Capacity | Town/Village | Previous season |
|---|---|---|---|---|
| Bath Old Edwardians | King Edward's School Playing Fields | | Bath | 10th |
| Bridgwater & Albion II | Bath Road | 5,000 | Bridgwater | 5th |
| Bristol Harlequins | Valhalla | | Brislington, Bristol | Relegated from Somerset Premier (13th) |
| Cheddar Valley | Sharpham Road | | Cheddar | 6th |
| Chew Valley II | Chew Lane | | Chew Magna | 4th |
| Crewkerne | Henhayes Recreation Ground | | Crewkerne | 11th |
| Keynsham II | Bristol Road | | Keynsham | 8th |
| Midsomer Norton II | Norton Down Playing Fields | | Midsomer Norton | Promoted from Somerset 2 North (champions) |
| North Petherton | Beggars Brook | | North Petherton | 3rd |
| Old Sulians | Lansdown Road | | Bath | 7th |
| Taunton II | Towergate Stadium | 2,000 (198 seats) | Taunton | Promoted from Somerset 2 South (champions) |
| Wellington II | Athletic Ground | | Wellington | 9th |

Locations of the 2019–20 Somerset 1 teams

== Original teams ==
When league rugby began in 1987 this division contained the following teams:

- Burnham-on-Sea
- Crewkerne
- Frome
- Hornets
- North Petherton
- Old Culverhaysians (Note: Old Boys side for Culverhay School (now Bath Academy).)
- Oldfield Old Boys (Note: Old Boys side for Oldfield School.)
- Old Sulians (Note: Old Boys side for City of Bath Boys School (now Beechen Cliff School).)
- Walcot Old Boys (Note: Now known as Walcot Rugby.)
- Wellington
- Yeovil (Note: Yeovil would later merge with Westland to form Ivel Barbarians in 1995. Ivel Barbarians would in turn be renamed as Yeovil Rugby Club in 2014.)

== Somerset 1 honours ==
=== Somerset 1 (1987–1993) ===
The original Somerset 1 was a tier 9 league with promotion to Gloucestershire/Somerset and relegation to Somerset 2.

Somerset 1
| Season | No of teams | Champions | Runners–up | Relegated team(s) | Ref |
| 1987–88 | 12 | Old Culverhaysians | Frome | Wellington, Crewkerne, Yeovil | |
| 1988–89 | 11 | Frome | Oldfield Old Boys | St. Brendan's Old Boys, Burnham-on-Sea | |
| 1989–90 | 11 | Oldfield Old Boys | Walcot Old Boys | Avonvale, Gordano | |
| 1990–91 | 11 | Wiveliscombe | Old Redcliffians | Yeovil, Imperial | |
| 1991–92 | 11 | Old Sulians | Old Redcliffians (Note: Due to restructuring of the majority of south west leagues from 11 to 13 teams for the following season, 3rd place Bristol Harlequins were also promoted.) | No relegation (Note: Due to the restructuring of Somerset 1 from 11 to 13 teams for the following season, there was no relegation.) | |
| 1992–93 | 13 | Hornets | Walcot Old Boys | Westland, Gordano | |
Green backgrounds are promotion places.

=== Somerset 1 (1993–1996) ===
The creation of National League 5 South for the 1993–94 season meant that Somerset 1 dropped to become a tier 10 league. Promotion continued to Gloucestershire/Somerset 1 and relegation to Somerset 2.

Somerset 1
| Season | No of teams | Champions | Runners–up | Relegated team(s) | Ref |
| 1993–94 | 13 | Midsomer Norton | Yatton | Stothert & Pitt, Imperial | |
| 1994–95 | 13 | Wellington | Walcot Old Boys | Yeovil, North Petherton, Wells | |
| 1995–96 | 13 | Chard (Note: League restructuring caused by the cancellation of National 5 South meant that champions Chard were promoted two divisions up into Western Counties North (formerly Western Counties).) | Wiveliscombe (Note: The cancellation of National 5 South meant that clubs ranked 3rd to 9th were also promoted one level up into Gloucestershire/Somerset including Tor, Yatton, Old Sulians, St. Bernadette's Old Boys, Midsomer Norton, Walcot Old Boys and Gordano.) | No relegation (Note: Widespread league restructuring meant that there was no relegation.) | |
Green backgrounds are promotion places.

=== Somerset 1 (1996–2000) ===
The cancellation of National League 5 South at the end of the 1995–96 season meant that Somerset 1 reverted to being a tier 9 league. Promotion continued to Gloucestershire/Somerset and relegation to Somerset 2.

Somerset 1
| Season | No of teams | Champions | Runners–up | Relegated team(s) | Ref |
| 1996–97 | 10 | Wells | Frome | Crewkerne | |
| 1997–98 | 10 | Chew Valley | Frome | Avonvale, Blagdon | |
| 1998–99 | 10 | Avon | North Petherton | Winscombe, Minehead Barbarians | |
| 1999–00 | 10 | Frome (Note: Restructuring caused by the cancellation of Gloucestershire/Somerset at the end of the 1999–00 season meant that champions Frome were not promoted.) | Wells | No relegation (Note: League restructuring meant there was no relegation.) | |
Green backgrounds are promotion places.

=== Somerset 1 (2000–2006) ===
The cancellation of Gloucestershire/Somerset at the end of the 1999–00 season, saw Somerset 1 remain at tier 9, with promotion now to the new Somerset Premier (Note: Gloucestershire/Somerset was split into Gloucester Premier and Somerset Premier at the end of the 1999–00 season.) and relegation continuing to Somerset 2.

Somerset 1
| Season | No of Teams | Champions | Runners–up | Relegated Teams | Ref |
| 2000–01 | 12 | Minehead Barbarians | Wells | Bristol Barbarians | |
| 2001–02 | 12 | Nailsea & Backwell | North Petherton | Burnham-on-Sea | |
| 2002–03 | 12 | Chard | Stothert & Pitt | Bath Old Edwardians, Avonvale | |
| 2003–04 | 12 | Winscombe | Combe Down | Old Sulians | |
| 2004–05 | 11 | Minehead Barbarians | Old Culverhaysians | Avonvale. Blagdon | |
| 2005–06 | 11 | Gordano | Wells | No relegation (Note: No relegation as league due to increase from 11 to 12 teams for the 2006–07 season.) | |
Green backgrounds are promotion places.

=== Somerset 1 (2006–2009) ===
Somerset 1 remained a tier 9 league with promotion to Somerset Premier but the splitting of Somerset 2 into two regional divisions, meant that relegation was now to either Somerset 2 North or Somerset 2 South. From the 2007–08 season onward the league sponsor would be Tribute.

Somerset 1
| Season | No of Teams | Champions | Runners–up | Relegated Teams | Ref |
| 2006–07 | 12 | Winscombe | Old Sulians | Somerton | |
| 2007–08 | 12 | Burnham-on-Sea | North Petherton | Martock, Crewkerne | |
| 2008–09 | 12 | St. Bernadette's Old Boys | Taunton II | Bristol Barbarians | |
Green backgrounds are promotion places.

=== Somerset 1 (2009–present) ===
Despite widespread restructuring by the RFU at the end of the 2008–09 season, Somerset 1 remained a tier 9 league, with promotion continuing to Somerset Premier, while relegation to either Somerset 2 North or Somerset 2 South. The league would continued to be sponsored by Tribute.

Somerset 1
| Season | No of Teams | Champions | Runners–up | Relegated Teams | Ref |
| 2009–10 | 12 | Gordano | Imperial | St. Mary's Old Boys II, Broad Plain (Note: Broad Plain were relegated to Gloucester 3 instead of Somerset 2.) | |
| 2010–11 | 14 | Nailsea & Backwell | Weston-super-Mare II | Old Culverhaysians | |
| 2011–12 | 14 | Old Redcliffians II | Wiveliscombe | No relegation | |
| 2012–13 | 14 | St. Bernadette's Old Boys | Bristol Barbarians | Walcot II | |
| 2013–14 | 14 | Clevedon II | Imperial | Old Redcliffians III, Wells II | |
| 2014–15 | 14 | Hornets II | Chew Valley II | Cheddar Valley, Midsomer Norton II | |
| 2015–16 | 14 | Bridgwater & Albion II | Crewkerne | Chard II, North Petherton II | |
| 2016–17 | 14 | Minehead Barbarians | Imperial | Castle Cary, Bristol Harlequins II, Yatton II | |
| 2017–18 | 13 | Bristol Barbarians | Bristol Harlequins | Wyvern, Clevedon II, Old Bristolians II | |
| 2018–19 | 12 | Tor | Stothert & Pitt | Castle Cary | |
| 2019–20 | 12 | Bristol Harlequins | Crewkerne | Bath Old Edwardians | |
| 2020–21 | 12 | | | | |
Green backgrounds are promotion places.

== Number of league titles ==
- Minehead Barbarians (3)
- Chard (2)
- Frome (2)
- Gordano (2)
- Nailsea & Backwell (2)
- St. Bernadette's Old Boys (2)
- Winscombe (2)
- Avon (1)
- Bridgwater & Albion II (1)
- Bristol Barbarians (1)
- Bristol Harlequins (1)
- Burnham-on-Sea (1)
- Chew Valley (1)
- Clevedon II (1)
- Hornets (1) (Note: As a club Hornets have won Somerset 1 twice – once by the 1st XV, once by the 2nd XV.)
- Hornets II (1)
- Midsomer Norton (1)
- Old Culverhaysians (1)
- Old Redcliffians II (1)
- Old Sulians (1)
- Oldfield Old Boys (1)
- Tor (1)
- Wellington (1)
- Wells (1)
- Wiveliscombe (1)

== See also ==
- South West Division RFU
- Somerset RFU
- Somerset Premier
- Somerset 2 North
- Somerset 2 South
- Somerset 3 North
- Somerset 3 South
- English rugby union system
- Rugby union in England
