= Counties 2 Somerset =

English rugby union league

- Current season or competition: 2024–25 Counties 2 Somerset
- Sport: Rugby union
- Instituted: 1987; 39 years ago (as Gloucestershire/Somerset)
- Number of teams: 12
- Country: England
- Most titles: Gordano (3 titles)
- Website: englandrugby.com

Counties 2 Somerset (formerly Somerset Premier (which was known as Tribute Somerset Premier for sponsorship reasons) is an English rugby union league which sits at the eighth level of league rugby union in England involving teams based in the county of Somerset as well as some teams based in Bristol. Originally a single division called Gloucestershire/Somerset, in 2000 the division split into two county leagues called Gloucester Premier and Somerset Premier and subsequently adopted its new name following the RFU Adult Competition Review at the end of season 2021–22.

The league champions of Counties 2 Somerset are promoted to Counties 1 Western North while the runners up play the runners up of Gloucester Premier for their place. Relegated teams drop into Counties 3 Somerset North or Counties 3 Somerset South depending on location.

== Teams 2026–27 ==
Departing were runners-up Burnham-on-Sea promoted to Counties 1 Western North while Keynham II (9th) and Castle Cary (11th) were relegated to Counties 3 Somerset (North) and Counties 3 Somerset (South) respectively.

With three clubs departing and four joining the league was restored to twelve sides.

Team	Ground	Capacity	Town/Village	Previous season
Avon	Hicksfield		Bath, Somerset	7th
Bridgwater & Albion	Bath Road	5,000	Bridgwater, Somerset	Relegated from Counties 1 Western North
Chew Valley II	Chew Lane		Chew Magna	10th
Clevedon	Coleridge Vale Playing Fields		Clevedon, Somerset	Champions (not promoted)
Hornets II	Hutton Moor Park	1,100 (100 stand)	Weston-super-Mare, Somerset	4th
Imperial	South Bristol Sports Centre		Hengrove, Bristol	6th
Minehead Barbarians	The Tom Stewart Field		Minehead, Somerset	3rd
Oldfield Old Boys	Shaft Road		Monkton Combe, Bath, Somerset	8th
St Bernadettes Old Boys	Whitchurch Sports Ground		Whitchurch, Bristol	5th
Taunton II	Towergate Stadium	2,000 (198 seats)	Taunton, Somerset	Relegated from Counties 1 Western North
Wells	Charter Way		Wells, Somerset	Promoted from Counties 3 Somerset (South)
Yatton	The Park		Yatton	Promoted from Counties 3 Somerset (North)

Locations of the 2026–27 Counties 2 Somerset teams

== Teams 2025–26 ==
Departing were Midsomer Norton, promoted to Counties 1 Western North. Nailsea & Backwell II (12th) and Wells (11th) were relegated to Counties 3 Somerset (North) and Counties 3 Somerset (South) respectively.

Rebels (6th in 2024–25) started but subsequently withdrew from the league leaving eleven clubs to contest the outstanding fixtures.

Team	Ground	Capacity	Town/Village	Previous season
Avon	Hicksfield		Bath, Somerset	3rd
Burnham-on-Sea	BASC Ground		Burnham-on-Sea, Somerset	Relegated from Counties 1 Western North
Castle Cary	Brook House Field		Castle Cary	Promoted from Counties 3 Somerset (South)
Chew Valley II	Chew Lane		Chew Magna	9th
Clevedon	Coleridge Vale Playing Fields		Clevedon, Somerset	Runners-up
Hornets II	Hutton Moor Park	1,100 (100 stand)	Weston-super-Mare, Somerset	5th
Imperial	South Bristol Sports Centre		Hengrove, Bristol	8th
Keynsham II	Bristol Road		Keynsham	Promoted from Counties 3 Somerset (North)
Minehead Barbarians	The Tom Stewart Field		Minehead, Somerset	4th
Oldfield Old Boys	Shaft Road		Monkton Combe, Bath, Somerset	7th
St Bernadettes Old Boys	Whitchurch Sports Ground		Whitchurch, Bristol	10th

Locations of the 2025–26 Counties 2 Somerset teams

== Teams 2024–25 ==
Departing were Taunton II, promoted to Counties 1 Western North. Yatton (12th) and Weston-super-Mare II (11th) were relegated.

Joining were Clevedon and Midsomer Norton, both relegated from Counties 1 Western North. Nailsea & Backwell II were promoted from Counties 3 Somerset North.

In the offseason Huish Tigers rebranded as Rebels Rugby.

Team	Ground	Capacity	Town/Village	Previous season
Avon	Hicksfield		Bath, Somerset	3rd
Chew Valley II	Chew Lane		Chew Magna	2nd
Clevedon	Coleridge Vale Playing Fields		Clevedon, Somerset	Relegated from Counties 1 Western North
Hornets II	Hutton Moor Park	1,100 (100 stand)	Weston-super-Mare, Somerset	4th
Imperial	South Bristol Sports Centre		Hengrove, Bristol	5th
Midsomer Norton	Norton Down Playing Fields		Midsomer Norton, Somerset	Relegated from Counties 1 Western North
Minehead Barbarians	The Tom Stewart Field		Minehead, Somerset	6th
Nailsea & Backwell II	West End Park		Nailsea, Somerset	Promoted from Counties 3 Somerset North
Oldfield Old Boys	Shaft Road		Monkton Combe, Bath, Somerset	9th
Rebels	Ash Meadow Park		Taunton, Somerset	8th
St Bernadettes Old Boys	Whitchurch Sports Ground		Whitchurch, Bristol	10th
Wells	Charter Way		Wells, Somerset	7th

Locations of the 2024–25 Counties 2 Somerset teams

== Teams 2023–24 ==
Departing were Old Redcliffians II, promoted to Counties 1 Western North. Tor were relegated.

Joining were Chew Valley II and Huish Tigers.

Team	Ground	Capacity	Town/Village	Previous season
Avon	Hicksfield		Bath, Somerset	5th
Chew Valley II	Chew Lane		Chew Magna	Promoted from Counties 3 Somerset North (champions)
Hornets II	Hutton Moor Park	1,100 (100 stand)	Weston-super-Mare, Somerset	2nd
Huish Tigers	Ash Meadow Park		Taunton, Somerset	Promoted from Counties 3 Somerset South (champions)
Imperial	South Bristol Sports Centre		Hengrove, Bristol	4th
Minehead Barbarians	The Tom Stewart Field		Minehead, Somerset	7th
Oldfield Old Boys	Shaft Road		Monkton Combe, Bath, Somerset	6th
St Bernadettes Old Boys	Whitchurch Sports Ground		Whitchurch, Bristol	11th
Taunton II	Veritas Park		Taunton, Somerset	3rd
Wells	Charter Way		Wells, Somerset	8th
Weston-super-Mare II	Recreation Ground	3,000	Weston-super-Mare, Somerset	9th
Yatton	The Park		Yatton, Somerset	10th

Locations of the 2023–24 Counties 2 Somerset teams

== Teams 2022–23 ==
This was the first season following the RFU Adult Competition Review.

Departing were Nailsea & Backwell, promoted to Counties 1 Western North. Bristol Harlequins, Stothert & Pitt and Crewkerne were relegated.

Joining were Old Redcliffians II, promoted, and Taunton II who had withdrawn from Somerset 1 the previous season.

With four departing and two joining the league was reduced from 14 clubs to 12.

Team	Ground	Capacity	Town/Village	Previous season
Avon	Hicksfield		Bath, Somerset	5th
Hornets II	Hutton Moor Park	1,100 (100 stand)	Weston-super-Mare, Somerset	2nd
Imperial	South Bristol Sports Centre		Hengrove, Bristol	7th
Minehead Barbarians	The Tom Stewart Field		Minehead, Somerset	3rd
Oldfield Old Boys	Shaft Road		Monkton Combe, Bath, Somerset	9th
Old Redcliffians II	Scotland Lane	1,000	Brislington, Bristol	Promoted from Somerset 1 (champions)
St Bernadettes Old Boys	Whitchurch Sports Ground		Whitchurch, Bristol	10th
Taunton II	Veritas Park		Taunton, Somerset	Re-entry
Tor	Brian Harbinson Memorial Park		Glastonbury, Somerset	11th
Wells	Charter Way		Wells, Somerset	6th
Weston-super-Mare II	Recreation Ground	3,000	Weston-super-Mare, Somerset	4th
Yatton	The Park		Yatton, Somerset	8th

Locations of the 2022–23 Counties 2 Somerset teams

== Teams 2021–22 ==
Team	Ground	Capacity	Town/Village	Previous season
Avon	Hicksfield		Bath, Somerset	5th
Bristol Harlequins	Valhalla		Brislington, Bristol	Promoted from Somerset 1 (champions)
Crewkerne	Henhayes Recreation Ground		Crewkerne	Promoted from Somerset 1 (runners up)
Hornets II	Hutton Moor Park	1,100 (100 stand)	Weston-super-Mare, Somerset	11th
Imperial	South Bristol Sports Centre		Hengrove, Bristol	7th
Minehead Barbarians	The Tom Stewart Field		Minehead, Somerset	3rd
Nailsea & Backwell	West End Park		Nailsea, Somerset	2nd
Oldfield Old Boys	Shaft Road		Monkton Combe, Bath, Somerset	6th
St Bernadettes Old Boys	Whitchurch Sports Ground		Whitchurch, Bristol	10th
Stothert & Pitt	Adams Field		Corston, Somerset	9th
Tor	Brian Harbinson Memorial Park		Glastonbury, Somerset	13th
Wells	Charter Way		Wells, Somerset	8th
Weston-super-Mare II	Recreation Ground	3,000	Weston-super-Mare, Somerset	12th
Yatton	The Park		Yatton, Somerset	4th

Locations of the 2021–22 Somerset Premier teams

== 2020–21 ==
Due to the COVID-19 pandemic, the 2020–21 season was cancelled.

== Teams 2019–20 ==
Team	Ground	Capacity	Town/Village	Previous season
Avon	Hicksfield		Bath, Somerset	4th
Burnham-on-Sea	BASC Ground		Burnham-on-Sea, Somerset	Runners up (lost playoff)
Hornets II	Hutton Moor Park	1,100 (100 stand)	Weston-super-Mare, Somerset	12th
Imperial	South Bristol Sports Centre		Hengrove, Bristol	3rd
Minehead Barbarians	The Tom Stewart Field		Minehead, Somerset	6th
Nailsea & Backwell	West End Park		Nailsea, Somerset	7th
Oldfield Old Boys	Shaft Road		Monkton Combe, Bath, Somerset	8th
Old Redcliffians II	Scotland Lane	1,000	Brislington, Bristol	9th
St Bernadettes Old Boys	Whitchurch Sports Ground		Whitchurch, Bristol	11th
Stothert & Pitt	Adams Field		Bath, Somerset	Promoted from Somerset 1 (runners up)
Tor	Brian Harbinson Memorial Park		Glastonbury, Somerset	Promoted from Somerset 1 (champions)
Wells	Charter Way		Wells, Somerset	Relegated from Western Counties North (14th)
Weston-super-Mare II	Recreation Ground	3,000	Weston-super-Mare, Somerset	10th
Yatton	The Park		Yatton, Somerset	5th

Locations of the 2019–20 Somerset Premier teams

== Teams 2018–19 ==
Team	Ground	Capacity	Town/Village	Previous season
Avon	Hicksfield		Bath, Somerset	3rd
Bristol Harlequins	Valhalla		Brislington, Bristol	Promoted from Somerset 1 (Runners Up) (Note: Somerset 1 runners up, Bristol Harlequins were promoted instead of champions, Bristol Barbarians.)
Burnham-on-Sea	BASC Ground		Burnham-on-Sea, Somerset	Relegated from Western Counties West (14th)
Hornets II	Hutton Moor Park	1,100 (100 stand)	Weston-super-Mare, Somerset	10th
Imperial	South Bristol Sports Centre		Hengrove, Bristol	5th
Minehead Barbarians	The Tom Stewart Field		Minehead, Somerset	8th
Nailsea & Backwell	West End Park		Nailsea, Somerset	7th
Oldfield Old Boys	Shaft Road		Monkton Combe, Bath, Somerset	Relegated from Western Counties North (14th)
Old Redcliffians II	Scotland Lane	1,000	Brislington, Bristol	6th
St Bernadettes Old Boys	Whitchurch Sports Ground		Whitchurch, Bristol	9th
Weston-super-Mare II	Recreation Ground	3,000	Weston-super-Mare, Somerset	4th
Wiveliscombe	Recreational Ground		Wiveliscombe, Somerset	Runners up (lost playoff)
Yatton	The Park		Yatton, Somerset	Relegated from Western Counties North (13th)

Locations of the 2018–19 Somerset Premier teams

== Teams 2017–18 ==
Team	Ground	Capacity	Town/Village	Previous season
Avon	Hicksfield		Bath, Somerset	Relegated from Western Counties North (14th)
Bridgwater & Albion II	Bath Road	5,000	Bridgwater, Somerset	11th
Gordano	Caswell Lane		Portbury, Somerset	6th
Hornets II	Hutton Moor Park	1,100 (100 stand)	Weston-super-Mare, Somerset	9th
Imperial	South Bristol Sports Centre		Hengrove, Bristol	Promoted from Somerset 1 (runners up)
Minehead Barbarians	The Tom Stewart Field		Minehead, Somerset	Promoted from Somerset 1 (champions)
Nailsea & Backwell	West End Park		Nailsea, Somerset	8th
Old Redcliffians II	Scotland Lane	1,000	Brislington, Bristol	7th
St Bernadettes Old Boys	Whitchurch Sports Ground		Whitchurch, Bristol	12th
Stothert & Pitt	Adams Field		Bath, Somerset	10th
Tor	Brian Harbinson Memorial Park		Glastonbury, Somerset	5th
Weston-super-Mare II	Recreation Ground	3,000	Weston-super-Mare, Somerset	4th
Wiveliscombe	Recreational Ground		Wiveliscombe, Somerset	3rd

Locations of the 2017–18 Somerset Premier teams

== 2016–17 ==
=== Participating teams ===
- Bridgwater & Albion II
- Bristol Harlequins (relegated from Western Counties North)
- Crewkerne (promoted from Somerset 1)
- Gordano
- Keynsham II
- Hornets II
- Nailsea & Backwell
- Oldfield Old Boys
- Old Redcliffians II
- St Bernadettes Old Boys
- Stothert & Pitt RFC
- Tor
- Weston-super-Mare II
- Winscombe
- Wiveliscombe

=== 1st XV teams participating in Somerset Regional Leagues ===
==== Somerset 1 ====
- Bristol Barbarians
- Castle Cary
- Imperial
- Minehead Barbarians (relegated from Somerset Premier)
- Old Sulians
- Wyvern

==== Somerset 2 North ====
- Bath Old Edwardians (promoted from Somerset 3 North)
- Cheddar Valley (transferred from Somerset 2 South)
- Old Culverhaysians

==== Somerset 2 South ====
- Martock
- Morganians
- Somerton

==== Somerset 3 North ====
- Avon II
- Barton Hill II
- Bristol Telephone Area
- Imperial II
- Keynsham IV
- Nailsea & Backwell II
- Old Bristolians III
- Oldfield Old Boys III

==== Somerset 3 South ====
- Wincanton

== 2015–16 ==
The 2015–16 Somerset Premier consists of fourteen teams from Somerset and south-west Bristol. The season began on the 5 September 2015 and ended on the 30 April 2016.

=== Participating teams and location ===
Eleven of the fourteen teams participated in last season's competition. The 2014–15 champions Gordano were promoted to Western Counties North while Bristol Imperial and Clevedon II were relegated to Somerset 1.

Locations of the 2015–16 Somerset Premier teams

Team	Ground	Capacity	Town/Village	Previous season
Chew Valley II	Chew Lane		Chew Magna, Somerset	Promoted from Somerset 1 (runners up)
Hornets II	Hutton Moor Park	1,100 (100 stand)	Weston-super-Mare, Somerset	Promoted from Somerset 1 (champions)
Minehead Barbarians	The Tom Stewart Field		Minehead, Somerset	8th
Nailsea & Backwell	West End Park		Nailsea, Somerset	9th
Oldfield Old Boys	Shaft Road		Bath, Somerset	10th
Old Redcliffians II	Scotland Lane	1,000	Brislington, Bristol	6th
St Bernadettes Old Boys	Whitchurch Sports Ground		Whitchurch, Bristol	12th
Stothert & Pitt	Adams Field		Bath, Somerset	Relegated from Western Counties North (14th)
Taunton II	Hyde Park	2,000	Taunton, Somerset	11th
Tor	Brian Harbinson Memorial Park		Glastonbury, Somerset	4th
Weston-super-Mare II	Recreation Ground	3,000	Weston-super-Mare, Somerset	3rd
Winscombe	Winscombe Recreation Ground	1,200	Winscombe, Somerset	2nd (lost promotion playoff)
Wiveliscombe	Recreational Ground		Wiveliscombe, Somerset	7th
Yatton	Off North End		Yatton, Somerset	5th

=== 1st XV teams participating in Somerset Regional Leagues ===
==== Somerset 1 ====
- Bristol Barbarians
- Castle Cray
- Crewkerne
- Imperial
- Old Sulians
- Wyvern

==== Somerset 2 North ====
- Old Culverhaysians

==== Somerset 2 South ====
- Cheddar Valley
- Martock
- Morganians
- Somerton

==== Somerset 3 North ====
- Bath Old Edwardians

== Participating clubs 2014–15 ==
- Clevedon II (promoted from Somerset 1)
- Gordano
- Imperial
- Minehead Barbarians
- Oldfield Old Boys (relegated from Western Counties North)
- Old Redcliffians II
- Nailsea & Backwell
- St Bernadettes Old Boys
- Taunton II
- Tor
- Weston-super-Mare II
- Winscombe
- Wiveliscombe
- Yatton

== Participating clubs 2013–14 ==
- Bristol Barbarians
- Gordano
- Keynsham II
- Minehead Barbarians
- Nailsea & Backwell
- Old Redcliffians II
- St Bernadettes Old Boys (promoted from Somerset 1)
- Stothert & Pitt
- Taunton II
- Tor
- Weston-super-Mare II
- Winscombe
- Wiveliscombe
- Yatton (relegated from Western Counties North)

== Participating clubs 2012–13 ==
- Chew Valley
- Gordano
- Imperial
- Keynsham
- Midsomer Norton
- Minehead Barbarians
- Nailsea & Backwell
- Old Redcliffians II
- Stothert & Pitt
- Taunton II
- Tor
- Weston-super-Mare II
- Winscombe
- Wiveliscombe

== Participating teams 2010–11 ==
- Avon
- Chard
- Chew Valley
- Gordano
- Imperial
- Midsomer Norton
- Minehead Barbarians
- St Bernadettes
- Stothert & Pitt
- Taunton II
- Tor
- Wells
- Weston Hornets
- Winscombe

== Standings 2009–10 ==
- 1 Bristol Harlequins 40
- 2 Chard 34
- 3 Taunton II 33
- 4 Avon 33
- 5 Wells 32
- 6 Stothert & Pitt 18
- 7 Tor 18
- 8 Midsomer Norton 18
- 9 Chew Valley 16
- 10 St Bernadettes 9
- 11 Winscombe 8
- 12 Old Sulians 3

== Standings 2008–09 ==
- 1 Burnham on Sea 35
- 2 North Petherton 34
- 3 Tor 30
- 4 Bristol Harlequins 28
- 5 Stothert & Pitt 26
- 6 Chew Valley 20
- 7 Chard 19
- 8 Midsomer Norton 18
- 9 Winscombe 18
- 10 Wells 17
- 11 Avon 15
- 12 Old Sulians 4

== Standings 2007–08 ==
- 1 Keynsham 40
- 2 Chew Valley 32
- 3 Winscombe 28
- 4 Wells 26
- 5 Midsomer Norton 26
- 6 Avon 22
- 7 Old Sulians 20
- 8 Stothert & Pitt 20
- 9 Chard 18
- 10 Tor 16
- 11 Gordano 8
- 12 St Bernadettes 6

== Original teams ==
When league rugby began in 1987 this division (known as Gloucestershire/Somerset) contained the following teams:

- Avonmouth Old Boys
- Cleve
- Combe Down
- Coney Hill
- Gordano
- Keynsham
- Midsomer Norton
- Minehead Barbarians
- St. Brendan's Old Boys
- Tredworth
- Whitehall

== Somerset Premier honours ==
=== Gloucestershire/Somerset (1987–1993) ===
Originally Gloucester Premier and Somerset Premier were combined in a single division known as Gloucestershire/Somerset, involving teams based in Gloucestershire, Somerset and Bristol. It was tier 8 league with promotion to Western Counties (Note: Since 1996 Western Counties has been split into two regional divisions; Western Counties North and Western Counties West.) and relegation to either Gloucestershire 1 (Note: Gloucestershire 1 was shortened to Gloucester 1 from the 1991–92 season onward.) or Somerset 1.

Gloucestershire/Somerset
Season	No of teams	Champions	Runners–up	Relegated team(s)	Ref
1987–88	11	Avonmouth Old Boys	Combe Down	St Brendan's Old Boys, Tredworth	
1988–89	11	Old Culverhaysians	Combe Down	Minehead Barbarians	
1989–90	10 (Note: Avon & Somerset Constabulary withdrew from league.)	Combe Down	Midsomer Norton	Old Redcliffians	
1990–91	11	Spartans	Whitehall	Midsomer Norton	
1991–92	11	Gloucester Old Boys	Drybrook (Note: 3rd place Wiveliscombe also promoted. The reason for so many promotions was due to the majority of south-west league increasing from 11 to 13 teams for the following season.)	Cleve	
1992–93	13	Old Patesians	Keynsham	Old Sulians	
Green backgrounds are promotion places.

=== Gloucestershire/Somerset (1993–1996) ===
The creation of National League 5 South for the 1993–94 season meant that Gloucestershire/Somerset dropped to become a tier 9 league. Promotion continued to Western Counties and relegation to either Gloucester 1 or Somerset 1.

Gloucestershire/Somerset
Season	No of teams	Champions	Runners–up	Relegated team(s)	Ref
1993–94	13	Dings Crusaders	St. Mary's Old Boys	Coney Hill, Frome	
1994–95	13	Keynsham	Whitehall	Midsomer Norton, Wiveliscombe	
1995–96	13	St. Mary's Old Boys	Cleve (Note: The cancellation of National League 5 South at the end of the 1995–96 would lead to widespread restructuring of the leagues. As a result all 13 clubs in Gloucestershire/Somerset would be promoted; St. Mary's Old Boys, Cleve, Hornets, Oldfield Old Boys, Thornbury, Avonmouth Old Boys, North Bristol, Whitehall, Bristol Harlequins, Cirencester and Old Redcliffians would go up into Western Counties North; Wellington would go up into Western Counties West; Stow-on-the Wold would go up into Southern Counties North.)	No relegation	
Green backgrounds are promotion places.

=== Gloucestershire/Somerset (1996–2000) ===
The cancellation of National League 5 South at the end of the 1995–96 season meant that Gloucestershire/Somerset reverted to being a tier 8 league. Further restructuring meant that promotion was now to Western Counties North (Note: Western Counties was split into Western Counties North and Western Counties West as part of RFU restructuring at the end of the 1995–96 season.), while relegation continued to either Gloucester 1 or Somerset 1.

Gloucestershire/Somerset
Season	No of teams	Champions	Runners–up	Relegated team(s)	Ref
1996–97	16	Coney Hill	Old Richians	Old Cryptians	
1997–98	17	St. Bernadette's Old Boys	Wiveliscombe	Bristol Saracens	
1998–99	17	Barton Hill	Chew Valley	Old Sulians	
1999–00	17	Old Centralians (Note: Despite finishing as champions, the cancellation of Gloucestershire/Somerset meant that Old Centralians were instead transferred into the new look Gloucester Premier.)	Yatton (Note: The cancellation of Gloucestershire/Somerset and creation meant that almost all teams were transferred into new leagues; Old Centralians, Bream, Chipping Sodbury, Avonmouth Old Boys, Bristol Saracens, Brockworth and Longlevens went into Gloucester Premier, while Yatton, Tor, Old Culverhaysians, Midsomer Norton, Walcot, Avon, Combe Down and Gordano went into Somerset Premier.)	Chard, Frampton Cotterell	
Green backgrounds are promotion places.

=== Somerset Premier (2000–2009) ===
Gloucestershire/Somerset was reorganised into two county leagues at the end of the 1999–00 season, Gloucester Premier and Somerset Premier, with both leagues remaining at level 8. Promotion from Somerset Premier was to Western Counties North and relegation to Somerset 1. From the 2007–08 season onward the league sponsor would be Tribute.

Somerset Premier
Season	No of Teams	Champions	Runners–up	Relegated Teams	Ref
2000–01	12	Walcot	Gordano	Combe Down	
2001–02	12	Bristol Harlequins	Yatton	Wells	
2002–03	12	Gordano	Midsomer Norton	Old Culverhaysians, Minehead Barbarians	
2003–04	12	Oldfield Old Boys	Nailsea & Backwell	North Petherton	
2004–05	12	Old Redcliffians	Tor	Wiveliscombe, Gordano	
2005–06	12	Minehead Barbarians	Tor	Old Culverhaysians, Winscombe	
2006–07	12	Old Redcliffians	Midsomer Norton	Combe Down, Nailsea & Backwell	
2007–08	12	Keynsham	Chew Valley	St Bernadettes Old Boys, Gordano	
2008–09	12	Burnham-on-Sea	North Petherton	Old Sulians, Avon, Wells	
Green backgrounds are promotion places.

=== Somerset Premier (2009–present) ===
Despite widespread restructuring by the RFU at the end of the 2008–09 season, Somerset Premier remained a tier 8 league, with promotion continuing to Western Counties North and relegation to Somerset 1. The league would continued to be sponsored by Tribute.

Somerset Premier
Season	No of Teams	Champions	Runners–up	Relegated Teams	Ref
2009–10	12	Bristol Harlequins	Chard	Old Sulians	
2010–11	14	Hornets	Chard	St Bernadettes Old Boys	
2011–12	13	Avon	Wells	No relegation	
2012–13	14	Chew Valley	Midsomer Norton	Imperial	
2013–14	14	Stothert & Pitt	Tor	Bristol Barbarians, Keynsham II	
2014–15	14	Gordano	Winscombe	Imperial, Clevedon II	
2015–16	14	Yatton	Winscombe	Minehead Barbarians, Chew Valley II	
2016–17	14	Winscombe	Oldfield Old Boys	Bristol Harlequins, Crewkerne	
2017–18	13	Gordano	Wiveliscombe	Bridgwater & Albion II, Tor, Stothert & Pitt	
2018–19	13	Wiveliscombe	Burnham-on-Sea	Bristol Harlequins	
2019–20	14	Burnham-on-Sea	Nailsea & Backwell	Old Redcliffians II	
2020–21	14				
Green backgrounds are promotion places.

== Promotion play-offs ==
Since the 2000–01 season there has been a play-off between the runners-up of the Gloucester Premier and Somerset Premier for the third and final promotion place to Western Counties North. The team with the superior league record has home advantage in the tie. At the end of the 2019–20 season Gloucester Premier teams have been the most successful with thirteen wins to the Somerset Premier teams six; and the home team has won promotion on twelve occasions compared to the away teams seven.

Gloucester Premier v Somerset Premier promotion play-off results
Season	Home team	Score	Away team	Venue	Attendance
2000–01	Gordano (S)	19–21	Old Centralians (G)	Caswell Lane, Portbury, Somerset	
2001–02	Yatton (S)	32–0	Drybrook (G)	The Park, Yatton, Somerset	
2002–03	Barton Hill (G)	36–0	Midsomer Norton (S)	Duncombe Lane, Speedwell, Bristol	
2003–04	Nailsea & Backwell (S) (Note: The result of the 2003–04 playoff between Nailsea & Backwell and Chosen Hill Former Pupils is unknown due to all the south-west promotion playoff games from this season missing from the RFU website. However, as Nailsea & Backwell were in the higher division the next season (and Chosen Hill Former Pupils were not) it is assumed they won the playoff game. Nailsea & Backwell would also have hosted the game as they had a better points record in their league than Chosen Hill Former Pupils did in theirs.)		Chosen Hill Former Pupils (G)	West End Park, Nailsea, Somerset	
2004–05	Tor (S)	25–26	Avonmouth Old Boys (G)	Brian Harbinson Memorial Park, Glastonbury, Somerset	
2005–06	Barton Hill (G)	20–0	Tor (S)	Duncombe Lane, Speedwell, Bristol	
2006–07	Midsomer Norton (S)	10–31	Widden Old Boys (G)	Norton Down Playing Fields, Midsomer Norton, Somerset	
2007–08	North Bristol (G)	29–17	Chew Valley (S)	Oaklands, Almondsbury, Gloucestershire	
2008–09	Southmead (G)	20–14	North Petherton (S)	Greenway Centre, Southmead, Bristol	
2009–10	Cirencester (G)	35–17	Chard (S)	The Whiteway, Cirencester, Gloucestershire	
2010–11	Chard (S)	32–12	Old Richians (G)	Essex Close, Chard, Somerset	
2011–12	Wells (S)	18–10	Drybrook (G)	Charter Way, Wells, Somerset	
2012–13	Midsomer Norton (S)	28–12	Frampton Cotterell (G)	Norton Down Playing Fields, Midsomer Norton, Somerset	
2013–14	Bristol Saracens (G)	19–8	Tor (S)	Bakewell Memorial Ground, Henbury, Bristol	
2014–15	Winscombe (S)	13–21	Whitehall (G)	Winscombe Recreation Ground, Winscombe, Somerset	
2015–16	Winscombe (S)	21–22	Cirencester (G)	Winscombe Recreation Ground, Winscombe, Somerset	
2016–17	Oldfield Old Boys (S)	9–6	St Mary's Old Boys (G)	Shaft Road, Monkton Combe, Somerset	1,000
2017–18	Wiveliscombe (S)	12–15	Barton Hill (G)	Recreational Ground, Wiveliscombe, Somerset	
2018–19	Burnham-on-Sea (S)	24–25	Bristol Saracens (G)	BASC Ground, Burnham-on-Sea, Somerset	
2019–20	Cancelled due to COVID-19 pandemic in the United Kingdom. Best ranked runner up – Cheltenham North (G) – promoted instead.				
2020–21					
Green background is the promoted team. G = Gloucester Premier and S = Somerset Premier

== Number of league titles ==
- Gordano (3)
- Bristol Harlequins (2)
- Burnham-on-Sea (2)
- Keynsham (2) (Note: One of Keynsham's titles was when league was known as Gloucestershire/Somerset.)
- Old Redcliffians (2)
- Avon (1)
- Avonmouth Old Boys (1) (Note: Avonmouth Old Boys title was when league was known as Gloucestershire/Somerset.)
- Barton Hill (1) (Note: Barton Hill's title was when league was known as Gloucestershire/Somerset.)
- Chew Valley (1)
- Combe Down (1) (Note: Combe Down's title was when league was known as Gloucestershire/Somerset.)
- Coney Hill (1) (Note: Coney Hill's title was when league was known as Gloucestershire/Somerset.)
- Dings Crusaders (1) (Note: Dings Crusaders title was when league was known as Gloucestershire/Somerset.)
- Gloucester Old Boys (1) (Note: Gloucester Old Boys title was when league was known as Gloucestershire/Somerset.)
- Hornets (1)
- Minehead Barbarians (1)
- Old Centralians (1) (Note: Old Centralians title was when league was known as Gloucestershire/Somerset.)
- Old Culverhaysians (1) (Note: Old Culverhaysians title was when league was known as Gloucestershire/Somerset.)
- Old Patesians (1) (Note: Old Patesians title was when league was known as Gloucestershire/Somerset.)
- Oldfield Old Boys (1)
- Spartans (1) (Note: Spartans title was when league was known as Gloucestershire/Somerset.)
- St. Bernadette's Old Boys (1) (Note: St. Bernadette's Old Boys title was when league was known as Gloucestershire/Somerset.)
- St. Mary's Old Boys (1) (Note: St. Mary's Old Boys title was when league was known as Gloucestershire/Somerset.)
- Stothert & Pitt (1)
- Walcot (1)
- Winscombe (1)
- Wiveliscombe (1)
- Yatton (1)

== See also ==
- South West Division RFU
- Somerset RFU
- Somerset 1
- Somerset 2 North
- Somerset 2 South
- Somerset 3 North
- Somerset 3 South
- English rugby union system
- Rugby union in England
