= Somerset 3 North =

English rugby union league

- Current season or competition: 2020–21 Somerset 3 North
- Sport: Rugby union
- Instituted: 1987; 39 years ago (as Somerset 3)
- Number of teams: 9
- Country: England
- Holders: Stothert & Pitt II (2nd title) (2019–20) (promoted to Somerset 2 North)
- Most titles: Avonvale, St. Brendan's Old Boys, Stothert & Pitt II (2 titles)
- Website: englandrugby.com

Somerset 3 North (known as Tribute Somerset 3 North for sponsorship reasons) is an English rugby union league which sits at the eleven level of league rugby union in England alongside its counterpart Somerset 3 South. When the division was founded in 1987 it was a single league known as Somerset 3, but since 2006 it has been split into two regional divisions.

Somerset 3 North currently involves teams from the northern part of Somerset as well as teams based in south and west Bristol. 1st, 2nd, 3rd and even 4th XV sides can participate in the division as long as they are not from the same club. The league champions, and occasionally runners up, are promoted to Somerset 2 North and there is no relegation as this is the lowest level of league rugby in Somerset.

== Teams 2021–22 ==
Team	Ground	Capacity	Town/Village	Previous season
Chew Valley III	Chew Lane		Chew Magna	2nd
Imperial II	South Bristol Sports Centre		Hengrove, Bristol	4th
Keynsham III	Bristol Road		Keynsham	6th
Nailsea & Backwell III	West End Park		Nailsea, Somerset	New entry
St. Bernadette's Old Boys II	Whitchurch Sports Ground		Whitchurch, Bristol	3rd

Locations of the 2021–22 Somerset 3 North teams

== 2020–21 ==
Due to the COVID-19 pandemic, the 2020–21 season was cancelled.

== Teams 2019–20 ==
Team	Ground	Capacity	Town/Village	Previous season
Bristol Harlequins II	Valhalla		Brislington, Bristol	N/A
Chew Valley III	Chew Lane		Chew Magna	Relegated from Somerset 2 North (12th)
Imperial II	South Bristol Sports Centre		Hengrove, Bristol	4th
Keynsham III	Bristol Road		Keynsham	N/A
Old Culverhaysians	Odd Down Sports Ground		Odd Down, Bath	N/A
St. Bernadette's Old Boys II	Whitchurch Sports Ground		Whitchurch, Bristol	5th
Stothert & Pitt II	Adams Field		Bath	3rd
Winscombe III	Recreation Ground	1,200	Winscombe	7th
Yatton III	The Park		Yatton	6th

Locations of the 2019–20 Somerset 3 North teams

== Original teams ==
When league rugby began in 1987 this league (known as Somerset 3) was a single division containing the following teams from Somerset and parts of Bristol:

- Avonvale
- Backwell (Note: Backwell are now known as Nailsea & Backwell RFC.)
- Bath Civil Service
- Castle Cary
- Chew Valley
- Morganians
- Old Ashtonians
- Tor
- Wincanton
- Westland (Note: Westland would later merge with Yeovil to form Ivel Barbarians in 1995. Ivel Barbarians would in turn be renamed as Yeovil Rugby Club in 2014.)

== Somerset 3 honours ==
=== Somerset 3 (1987–1989) ===
The original Somerset 3 was a tier 11 league with promotion to Somerset 2 and there was no relegation.

Somerset 3
Season	No of teams	Champions	Runners–up	Relegated team(s)	Ref
1987–88	10	Avonvale	Westland	No relegation	
1988–89	12	Wiveliscombe	Tor	No relegation	
Green backgrounds are promotion places.

=== Somerset 3A / 3B (1989–1990) ===
For the 1989–90 season Somerset 3 split into two regional leagues – Somerset 3A and Somerset 3B – both at tier 11 of the league system. Promotion continued to Somerset 2 and there was no relegation.

Somerset 3
Season	No of teams	Champions	Runners–up	Relegated team(s)	League Name	Ref
1989–90	7	Blagdon	Backwell	No relegation	Somerset 3A	
1989–90	7	Wellington	Chard	No relegation	Somerset 3B	
Green backgrounds are promotion places.

=== Somerset 3 (1990–1993) ===
After a single season Somerset 3 reverted to being a single division at tier 11 of the league system. Promotion continued to Somerset 2 and there was no relegation.

Somerset 3
Season	No of teams	Champions	Runners–up	Relegated team(s)	Ref
1990–91	12	Backwell	Westland	No relegation	
1991–92	11	Chard	Bath Civil Services (Note: Restructuring of the majority of the south west leagues from 11 to 13 teams meant that five clubs were promoted including Avon, Bath Old Edwardians and Castle Cary.)	No relegation	
1992–93	7	Chew Valley	Old Ashtonians	No relegation	
Green backgrounds are promotion places.

=== Somerset 3 (1993–1996) ===
The creation of National League 5 South for the 1993–94 season meant that Somerset 3 dropped to become a tier 12 league. Promotion continued to Somerset 2 and there was no relegation.

Somerset 3
Season	No of teams	Champions	Runners–up	Relegated team(s)	Ref
1993–94	9	St. Brendan's Old Boys	Cheddar Valley	No relegation	
1994–95	9	Avonvale	Bath Saracens	No relegation	
1995–96	9	St. Brendan's Old Boys	Cheddar Valley (Note: 3rd place Castle Cary also promoted.)	No relegation	
Green backgrounds are promotion places.

=== Somerset 3 (1996–2000) ===
The cancellation of National League 5 South at the end of the 1995–96 season meant that Somerset 3 reverted to being a tier 11 league. Promotion continued to Somerset 2 and there was no relegation. Somerset 3 was cancelled at the end of the 1999–00 season and all teams transferred into Somerset 2.

Somerset 3
Season	No of teams	Champions	Runners–up	Relegated team(s)	Ref
1996–97	6	British Gas	Burnham-on-Sea	No relegation	
1997–98	5	Bath Old Edwardians	Bath Saracens	No relegation	
1998–99	5	Castle Cary	Crewkerne	No relegation	
1999–00	5	Martock (Note: Champions Martock would be promoted into Dorset & Wilts 2 North instead of Somerset 2.)	Bath Old Edwardians (Note: Due to the cancellation of Somerset 3 at the end of the 1999–00 season all clubs were promoted into different divisions. Bath Old Edwardians, Cheddar Valley and Morganians would join Somerset 2, while Wincanton would join champions Martock in Dorset & Wilts 2 North.)	No relegation	
Green backgrounds are promotion places.

=== Somerset 3 North ===
After an absence of six years, Somerset 3 returned – now split into two regional tier 11 divisions – Somerset 3 North and Somerset 3 South. This restructuring was to enable 2nd XV and 3rd XV sides to play in the Somerset leagues for the first time. Promotion was now to Somerset 2 North (Note: Somerset 2 had also split into two regional divisions – Somerset 2 North and Somerset 2 South – at the start of the 2006–07 season.) and there was no relegation. From the 2007–08 season onward the league sponsor would be Tribute.

Somerset 3 North
Season	No of Teams	Champions	Runners–up	Relegated Teams	Ref
2006–07	12	Walcot III (Note: Despite finishing as champions, Walcot III were not promoted as the club's 2nd XV were already in Somerset 2 North.)	Clevedon III	No relegation	
2007–08	14	Clevedon III (Note: Despite finishing as champions, Clevedon III were not promoted as the club's 2nd XV were already in Somerset 2 North.)	Chew Valley II	No relegation	
2008–09	14	Old Redcliffians III	Clevedon III	No relegation	
Green backgrounds are promotion places.

=== Somerset 3 North (2009–present) ===
Despite widespread restructuring by the RFU at the end of the 2008–09 season, Somerset 3 North and its counterpart Somerset 3 South, remained as tier 11 leagues. Promotion continued to Somerset 2 North and there was no relegation. The league would continued to be sponsored by Tribute.

Somerset 3 North
Season	No of Teams	Champions	Runners–up	Relegated Teams	Ref
2009–10	13	Keynsham III	Walcot III	No relegation	
2010–11	12	Avon II	Clevedon III	No relegation	
2011–12	13	Old Redcliffians IV (Note: Despite finishing as champions, Old Redcliffians IV would drop out of the Somerset leagues before the start of the new season.)	Midsomer Norton III	No relegation	
2012–13	7	Nailsea & Backwell II	Bath Old Edwardians	No relegation	
2013–14	11	Stothert & Pitt II	Imperial II	No relegation	
2014–15	13	Midsomer Norton III	Bristol Barbarians II	No relegation	
2015–16	9	Whitehall II	Bath Old Edwardians	No relegation	
2016–17	10	Bristol Telephone Area	Barton Hill II	No relegation	
2017–18	10	Barton Hill II	Clevedon III (Note: Runners up Clevedon III would drop out of the league as the club's 2nd XV were relegated from Somerset 1 at the end of the season, dropping two divisions down into Somerset 3 North.)	No relegation	
2018–19	7	Clevedon II	Nailsea & Backwell II	No relegation	
2019–20	9	Stothert & Pitt II	Chew Valley III	No relegation	
2020–21					
Green backgrounds are promotion places.

== Number of league titles ==
- Avonvale (2) (Note: Both of Avonvale's titles were for Somerset 3.)
- St. Brendan's Old Boys(2) (Note: Both of St. Brendan's Old Boys titles were for Somerset 3.)
- Stothert & Pitt II (2)
- Backwell (1) (Note: Backwell's title was for Somerset 3. Now known as Nailsea & Backwell, the club has won the division twice – the 2nd XV having won Somerset 3 North.)
- Avon II (1)
- Barton Hill II (1)
- Bath Old Edwardians (1) (Note: Bath Old Edwardians title was for Somerset 3.)
- Blagdon (1) (Note: Blagdon's title was for Somerset 3.)
- British Gas (1) (Note: British Gas's title was for Somerset 3.)
- Bristol Telephone Area (1)
- Castle Cary (1) (Note: Castle Cary's title was for Somerset 3.)
- Chard (1) (Note: Chard's title was for Somerset 3.)
- Chew Valley (1) (Note: Chew Valley's title was for Somerset 3.)
- Clevedon II (1) (Note: as a club Clevedon have won Somerset 3 North twice – once by the 2nd XV, once by the 3rd XV.)
- Clevedon III (1)
- Keynsham III (1)
- Martock (1) (Note: Martock's title was for Somerset 3.)
- Midsomer Norton III (1)
- Nailsea & Backwell II (1) (Note: 2nd XV of club formerly known as Backwell])
- Old Redcliffians III (1) (Note: as a club Old Redcliffians have won Somerset 3 North twice – once by the 3rd XV, once by the 4th XV.)
- Old Redcliffians IV (1)
- Walcot III (1)
- Wellington (1) (Note: Wellington's title was for Somerset 3.)
- Whitehall II (1)
- Wiveliscombe (1) (Note: Wiveliscombe's title was for Somerset 3.)

== See also ==
- South West Division RFU
- Somerset RFU
- Somerset Premier
- Somerset 1
- Somerset 2 North
- Somerset 2 South
- Somerset 3 South
- English rugby union system
- Rugby union in England
