= Somerset 3 South =

English rugby union league

Somerset 2 South
- Current season or competition: 2020–21 Somerset 3 South
- Sport: Rugby union
- Instituted: 1987; 39 years ago (as Somerset 3)
- Number of teams: 5
- Country: England
- Holders: Cheddar Valley II (1st title) (2019–20) (promoted to Somerset 2 South)
- Most titles: Avonvale, Hornets III, St. Brendan's Old Boys, Taunton III (2 titles)
- Website: englandrugby.com

Somerset 3 South (known as Tribute Somerset 3 South for sponsorship reasons) is an English rugby union league which sits at the eleven level of league rugby union in England alongside its counterpart Somerset 3 North. When the division was founded in 1987 it was a single league known as Somerset 3, but since 2006 it has been split into two regional divisions.

Somerset 3 South currently involves teams from the southern part of Somerset – although this means anywhere in the county outside Bristol. 1st, 2nd, 3rd and even 4th XV sides can participate in the division as long as they are not from the same club. The league champions, and occasionally runners up, are promoted to Somerset 2 South and there is no relegation as this is the lowest level of league rugby in Somerset.

== Teams 2021–22 ==
Team	Ground	Capacity	Town/Village	Previous season
Crewkerne II	Henhayes Recreation Ground		Crewkerne	New entry
Frome III	Gypsy Lane		Frome	4th
Huish Tigers	Richard Huish College		Taunton, Somerset	New entry
Midsomer Norton III	Norton Down Playing Fields		Midsomer Norton	3rd
Tor II	Brian Harbinson Memorial Park		Glastonbury, Somerset	New entry
Wincanton	Wincanton Sports Ground		Wincanton, Somerset	New entry

Locations of the 2021–22 Somerset 3 South teams

== 2020–21 ==
Due to the COVID-19 pandemic, the 2020–21 season was cancelled.

== Teams 2019–20 ==
Team	Ground	Capacity	Town/Village	Previous season
Chard III	The Park, Essex Close		Chard	6th
Cheddar Valley II	Sharpham Road		Cheddar	5th
Frome III	Gypsy Lane		Frome	N/A
Martock	The Recreation Ground		Martock	Relegated from Somerset 2 South (11th)
Midsomer Norton III	Norton Down Playing Fields		Midsomer Norton	4th

Locations of the 2019–20 Somerset 3 South teams

== Original teams ==
When league rugby began in 1987 this league (known as Somerset 3) was a single division containing the following teams from Somerset and parts of Bristol:

- Avonvale
- Backwell (Note: Backwell are now known as Nailsea & Backwell RFC.)
- Bath Civil Service
- Castle Cary
- Chew Valley
- Morganians
- Old Ashtonians
- Tor
- Wincanton
- Westland (Note: Westland would later merge with Yeovil to form Ivel Barbarians in 1995. Ivel Barbarians would in turn be renamed as Yeovil Rugby Club in 2014.)

== Somerset 3 honours ==
=== Somerset 3 (1987–1989) ===
The original Somerset 3 was a tier 10 league with promotion to Somerset 2 and there was no relegation.

Somerset 3
Season	No of teams	Champions	Runners–up	Relegated teams	Ref
1987–88	10	Avonvale	Westland	No relegation	
1988–89	12	Wiveliscombe	Tor	No relegation	
Green backgrounds are promotion places.

=== Somerset 3A / 3B (1989–1990) ===
For the 1989–90 season Somerset 3 split into two regional leagues – Somerset 3A and Somerset 3B – both at tier 10 of the league system. Promotion continued to Somerset 2 and there was no relegation.

Somerset 3
Season	No of teams	Champions	Runners–up	Relegated teams	League name	Ref
1989–90	7	Blagdon	Backwell	No relegation	Somerset 3A	
1989–90	7	Wellington	Chard	No relegation	Somerset 3B	
Green backgrounds are promotion places.

=== Somerset 3 (1990–1993) ===
After a single season Somerset 3 reverted to being a single division at tier 10 of the league system. Promotion continued to Somerset 2 and there was no relegation.

Somerset 3
Season	No of teams	Champions	Runners–up	Relegated teams	Ref
1990–91	12	Backwell	Westland	No relegation	
1991–92	11	Chard	Bath Civil Services (Note: Restructuring of the majority of the south west leagues from 11 to 13 teams meant that five clubs were promoted including Avon, Bath Old Edwardians and Castle Cary.)	No relegation	
1992–93	7	Chew Valley	Old Ashtonians	No relegation	
Green backgrounds are promotion places.

=== Somerset 3 (1993–1996) ===
The creation of National League 5 South for the 1993–94 season meant that Somerset 3 dropped to become a tier 12 league. Promotion continued to Somerset 2 and there was no relegation.

Somerset 3
Season	No of teams	Champions	Runners–up	Relegated teams	Ref
1993–94	9	St. Brendan's Old Boys	Cheddar Valley	No relegation	
1994–95	9	Avonvale	Bath Saracens	No relegation	
1995–96	9	St. Brendan's Old Boys	Cheddar Valley (Note: 3rd place Castle Cary also promoted.)	No relegation	
Green backgrounds are promotion places.

=== Somerset 3 (1996–2000) ===
The cancellation of National League 5 South at the end of the 1995–96 season meant that Somerset 3 reverted to being a tier 11 league. Promotion continued to Somerset 2 and there was no relegation. Somerset 3 was cancelled at the end of the 1999–2000 season and all teams transferred into Somerset 2.

Somerset 3
Season	No of teams	Champions	Runners–up	Relegated teams	Ref
1996–97	6	British Gas	Burnham-on-Sea	No relegation	
1997–98	5	Bath Old Edwardians	Bath Saracens	No relegation	
1998–99	5	Castle Cary	Crewkerne	No relegation	
1999–2000	5	Martock (Note: Champions Martock would be promoted into Dorset & Wilts 2 North instead of Somerset 2.)	Bath Old Edwardians (Note: Due to the cancellation of Somerset 3 at the end of the 1999–2000 season all clubs were promoted into different divisions. Bath Old Edwardians, Cheddar Valley and Morganians would join Somerset 2, while Wincanton would join champions Martock in Dorset & Wilts 2 North.)	No relegation	
Green backgrounds are promotion places.

=== Somerset 3 South ===
After an absence of six years, Somerset 3 returned – now split into two regional tier 10 divisions – Somerset 3 North and Somerset 3 South. This restructuring was to enable 2nd XV and 3rd XV sides to play in the Somerset leagues for the first time. Promotion was now to Somerset 2 South (Note: Somerset 2 had also split into two regional divisions – Somerset 2 North and Somerset 2 South – at the start of the 2006–07 season.) and there was no relegation. From the 2007–08 season onward the league sponsor would be Tribute.

Somerset 3 South
Season	No of Teams	Champions	Runners–up	Relegated teams	Ref
2006–07	12	Bridgwater & Albion III	Wells II (Note: Mistakenly listed as Wells 1st XV on RFU website – the 1st team were actually in Somerset Premier.)	No relegation	
2007–08	13	Taunton III	Wiveliscombe II	No relegation	
2008–09	13	Weston-super-Mare III	Castle Cary	No relegation	
Green backgrounds are promotion places.

=== Somerset 3 South (2009–present) ===
Somerset 3 South
Season	No of Teams	Champions	Runners–up	Relegated teams	Ref
2009–10	13	Chew Valley II	Morganians	No relegation	
2010–11	12	Hornets III	Bridgwater & Albion III	No relegation	
2011–12	8	Burnham-on-Sea II	Wyvern	No relegation	
2012–13	9	Hornets III	Wells III	No relegation	
2013–14	10	Wellington III	Martock	No relegation	
2014–15	10	Frome III	Martock	No relegation	
2015–16	11	Yeovil II	Wells III	No relegation	
2016–17	10	Weston-super-Mare IV	Wincanton	No relegation	
2017–18	11	Taunton III	Wyvern II (Note: Despite finishing as runners up Wyvern II would drop out of the league for following season, due to the 1st XV being relegated two divisions down from Somerset 1.)	No relegation	
2018–19	8	Tor II	Wyvern	No relegation	
2019–20	5	Cheddar Valley II	Martock	No relegation	
2020–21					
Green backgrounds are promotion places.

== Number of league titles ==
- Avonvale (2) (Note: Both of Avonvale's titles were for Somerset 3.)
- Hornets III (2)
- St. Brendan's Old Boys(2) (Note: Both of St. Brendan's Old Boys titles were for Somerset 3.)
- Taunton III (2)
- Backwell (1) (Note: Backwell's title was for Somerset 3.)
- Bath Old Edwardians (1) (Note: Bath Old Edwardians title was for Somerset 3.)
- Blagdon (1) (Note: Blagdon's title was for Somerset 3.)
- Bridgwater & Albion III (1)
- British Gas (1) (Note: British Gas's title was for Somerset 3.)
- Burnham-on-Sea II (1)
- Castle Cary (1) (Note: Castle Cary's title was for Somerset 3.)
- Chard (1) (Note: Chard's title was for Somerset 3.)
- Cheddar Valley II (1)
- Chew Valley (1) (Note: As a club Chew Valley have won Somerset 3 twice. The 1st XV won Somerset 3 when it was a single division, while the 2nd XV have won Somerset 3 South.)
- Chew Valley II (1)
- Frome III (1)
- Martock (1) (Note: Martock's title was for Somerset 3.)
- Tor II (1)
- Wellington (1) (Note: As a club Wellington have won Somerset 3 twice. The 1st XV won Somerset 3 when it was a single division, while the 3rd XV have won Somerset 3 South.)
- Wellington III (1)
- Weston-super-Mare III (1) (Note: As a club Weston-super-Mare have won Somerset 3 South twice – once by the 3rd XV, once by the 4th XV.)
- Weston-super-Mare IV (1)
- Wiveliscombe (1) (Note: Wiveliscombe's title was for Somerset 3.)
- Yeovil II (1)

== See also ==
- South West Division RFU
- Somerset RFU
- Somerset Premier
- Somerset 1
- Somerset 2 North
- Somerset 2 South
- Somerset 3 North
- English rugby union system
- Rugby union in England
