= Old Redcliffians =

English rugby union club, based in Bristol

(England) Old Redcliffians
- Full name: Old Redcliffians Rugby Football Club
- Union: Somerset RFU
- Founded: 1918; 108 years ago
- Location: Brislington, Bristol, England
- Ground: Scotland Lane (Capacity: 1,000)
- Chairman: Matt Oakley
- President: Raymond Massey
- Coach: Saul Nelson
- League: National League 2 West
- 2025–26: 8th
Team kit

Official website
- www.pitchero.com/clubs/oldredcliffians/

Old Redcliffians Rugby Football Club is an English rugby union team based in Brislington, a suburb of Bristol. The club runs four senior sides and a sevens team as well as a ladies side and the full range of junior teams. The first XV currently plays in National League 2 West, a level four league in the English rugby union system, following promotion from National League 3 South West in 2016–17. The 2011–12 season was successful for the other senior teams as they all achieved promotion; the second XV now play in the Tribute Somerset Premier, the third XV play in Tribute Somerset 1 and the fourth XV play in Tribute Somerset 2 North.

The rugby club was formed in 1918 by former pupils of Redcliffe Boys School, originally playing at Daventry Road in Knowle up until 1968 when they moved to their current ground, Scotland Lane, in Brislington.

== Ground ==
Scotland Lane is based in Brislington on the south-east edge of Bristol, with access by car via the A4 . The ground consists of a club-house, gym and five pitches, including one with floodlights, and there is onsite parking. Capacity around the main pitch (next to clubhouse) is approximately 1,000 standing.

== Current standings ==
2026–27 National League 2 West table
Pos	Team	Pld	W	D	L	PF	PA	PD	TB	LB	Pts	Qualification
1	Redruth	6	6	0	0	265	121	+144	5	0	29	Promotion place
2	Taunton Titans	6	5	0	1	264	132	+132	5	1	26	Promotion play-off
3	Hinckley	6	5	0	1	253	108	+145	5	0	25	
4	Luctonians	6	5	0	1	198	129	+69	5	0	25	
5	Clifton	6	5	0	1	240	189	+51	5	0	25	
6	Lymm	6	4	0	2	198	202	−4	5	1	22	
7	Old Redcliffians	6	3	0	3	194	188	+6	5	1	18	
8	Cinderford	6	3	0	3	222	250	−28	5	0	17	
9	Loughborough Students	6	2	0	4	197	236	−39	5	1	14	
10	Hornets	6	1	0	5	180	200	−20	4	4	12	
11	Barnstaple	6	2	0	4	139	174	−35	2	1	11	
12	Bournville	6	1	0	5	212	348	−136	5	1	10	Relegation play-off
13	Devonport Services	6	0	0	6	145	294	−149	3	1	4	Relegation place
14	Exeter University	6	0	0	6	140	276	−136	2	0	2	Relegation place

Updated to match(es) played on 5 September 2026. Source: National League Rugby
Rules for classification: If teams are level at any stage, tiebreakers are applied in the following order:
1. Number of matches won
2. Number of matches drawn
3. Difference between points for and against
4. Total number of points for
5. Aggregate number of points scored in matches between tied teams
6. Number of matches won excluding the first match, then the second and so on until the tie is settled

== Honours ==
1st team:

- Combination Merit Table champions (3): 1977–78, 1981–82, 1983–84
- Bristol Combination Cup winners (4): 1979–80, 1982–83, 1984–85, 2012–13
- Somerset Senior Cup winners (4): 1983–84, 1984–85, 1999–00, 2013–14
- Bristol Combination Plate winners: 1989–90
- Somerset Premier champions (2): 2004–05, 2006–07
- Western Counties North champions: 2009–10
- RFU Intermediate Cup winners: 2009–10
- South West 1 (east v west) promotion play-off winner: 2010–11
- South West 1 West champions: 2012–13
- National League 3 South West champions: 2016–17

2nd team:

- Somerset 2 North champions: 2007–08
- Somerset 1 champions: 2011–12

3rd team:

- Somerset 3 North champions: 2008–09
- Somerset 2 North champions (2): 2011–12, 2015–16

4th team:

- Somerset 3 North champions: 2011–12

== Notable former players ==
- Darren Barry
- Graeme Beveridge
- Ellis Genge
