= Rugby Football Union South West Division =

Rugby union governing body for South West England

The Rugby Football Union South West Division is a rugby union governing body for South West England and is part of the Rugby Football Union.

== Constituent Bodies ==
- Berkshire
- Buckinghamshire
- Cornwall
- Devon
- Dorset & Wilts
- Gloucestershire
- Oxfordshire

== Leagues ==
It organises the following leagues:

- South West Premier (tier 5)
- South West 1 East (6)
- South West 1 West (6)
- Southern Counties North (7)
- Southern Counties South (7)
- Western Counties North (7)
- Western Counties West (7)
- Cornwall/Devon (8)
- Cornwall 1 (9)
- Cornwall 2 (10)
- Devon 1 (9)
- Gloucester Premier (8)
- Gloucester 1 (9)
- Gloucester 2 North (10)
- Gloucester 2 South (10)
- Tribute Somerset Premier (8)
- Somerset 1 (9)
- Somerset 2 North (10)
- Somerset 2 South (10)
- Somerset 3 North (11)
- Somerset 3 South (11)
- Berks/Bucks & Oxon Premier (8)
- Berks/Bucks & Oxon Championship (9)
- Dorset & Wilts 1 North (8)
- Dorset & Wilts 1 South (8)
- Dorset & Wilts 2 North (9)
- Dorset & Wilts 2 South (9)
- Dorset & Wilts 3 North (10)
- Dorset & Wilts 3 South (10)

== Cups ==
Clubs also take part in the following national cup competitions:

- RFU Intermediate Cup
- RFU Senior Vase
- RFU Junior Vase

== See also ==
- London & SE Division
- Midland Division
- Northern Division
- English rugby union system
