= Somerset Rugby Football Union =

Rugby union governing body in England

Somerset County RFU Ltd.
- Sport: Rugby union
- Jurisdiction: Somerset, England
- Founded: 1875; 151 years ago
- Affiliation: RFU
- Headquarters: Somerset
- President: Nick Robins
- Chairman: Jon Whittock

Official website
- www.somersetrfu.co.uk
- (England)

The Somerset County Rugby Football Union (SCRFU) is the governing body for the sport of rugby union in the county of Somerset in England. The union is the constituent body of the Rugby Football Union (RFU) for Somerset. The SCRFU administers and organises rugby union clubs and competitions in the Somerset including the county rugby representative teams.

== History ==
The first Somerset rugby team played against Devon at Taunton in the 1875–76 season and the Somerset County Rugby Football Union was founded at a meeting in Bridgwater in September 1882. The county men's senior team has reached the County Championship final on five occasions, winning in their first final in 1923 but losing the remaining four. They currently play in Division 2.

Honors

- County Championship winners: 1923

== Affiliated clubs ==
There are currently 57 clubs affiliated with the Somerset RFU, most of which have teams at both senior and junior level, and are based in Somerset as well as parts of Bristol.

- Avon
- Avondale
- Bath
- Bath Old Edwardians
- Bath Saracens
- Bath Spa University College
- Blake Bears
- Bridgwater & Albion
- Bristol Barbarians
- Bristol Harlequins
- Burnham-on-Sea
- Butleigh Amateurs
- Castle Cary
- Chard
- Cheddar Valley
- Chew Valley
- Clevedon
- Combe Down
- Crewkerne
- Evercreech Barbarians
- Frome
- Gordano
- Hornets
- Imperial
- Keynsham
- Martock
- Midsomer Norton
- Milborne Port
- Millfield Old Boys
- Minehead Barbarians
- Morganians
- Nailsea and Backwell
- North Petherton
- North Wootton
- Old Alruedians
- Old Bristolians (Note: Old Bristolians are joint members of both the Gloucestershire RFU and Somerset RFU.)
- Old Culverhaysians
- Old Redcliffians
- Old Sulians
- Oldfield Old Boys
- Somerton
- St. Bernadette's Old Boys
- St. Brendan's Old Boys
- Stothert & Pitt
- Taunton Titans
- Tor
- University of Bath
- Walcot
- Wellington
- Wells
- Weston-super-Mare
- Wincanton
- Winscombe
- Wiveliscombe
- Wyvern
- Yatton
- Yeovil (Note: Although members of the Somerset RFU, Yeovil actually play in the Dorset & Wilts regional leagues.)

== County club competitions ==
Somerset team kit

The Somerset RFU currently runs the following club competitions for club sides in Somerset and parts of Bristol:

=== Leagues ===
- Somerset Premier – league ranked at tier 8 of the English rugby union system)
- Somerset 1 – tier 9 league
- Somerset 2 North – tier 10 league
- Somerset 2 South – tier 10 league
- Somerset 3 North – tier 11 league
- Somerset 3 South – tier 11 league

=== Cups ===
- Somerset Senior Cup – for club sides that typically play between tiers 4–7 of the English rugby union league system.
- Somerset Senior Vase – open to club sides that typically play between tiers 7–9.

== See also ==
- Category:Somerset County RFU players
