= Bridgwater & Albion RFC =

English rugby union club, based in Bridgwater, Somerset

- Full name: Bridgwater & Albion Rugby Football Club
- Union: Somerset RFU
- Nickname: Bridgy
- Founded: 1875; 151 years ago
- Location: Bridgwater, Somerset, England
- Ground: College Way (Capacity: 5,000 (600 seats))
- Chairman: Steve Smith
- President: Mike Berry
- Coach: Wayne Sprangle
- Captain: Oliver Dunn
- League: Counties 1 Western North
- 2024–25: 6th
Team kit

Official website
- barfc.co.uk

Bridgwater & Albion Rugby Football Club is an English rugby union team based in Bridgwater, Somerset and run two senior teams, a newly formed senior women's team, a colts side and a youth section featuring the full range of age-groups. The first XV play in regional rugby, currently in Counties 1 Western North.

== History ==
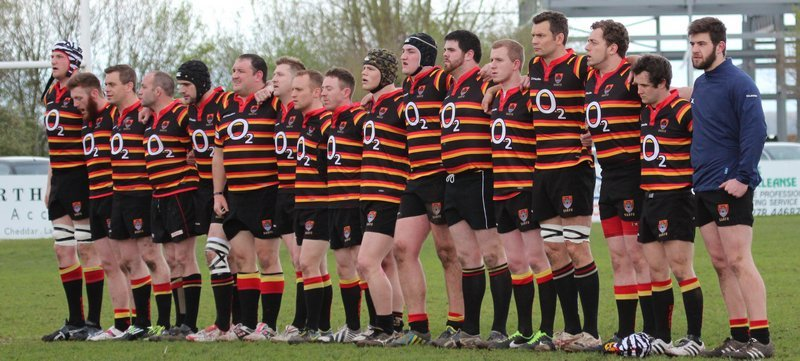
Team 2014

The club was founded in 1875. In the early 20th-century players from the club, including Robert Dibble and Tommy Woods represented England. In World War II the Broadway ground in Taunton Road was used for allotments with rugby transferring to Victoria Park, but after 1946 the ground was restored, with the grandstand being built in 1952.

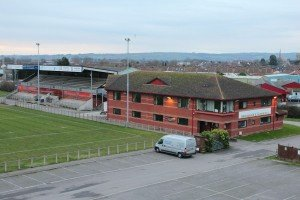
BARFC Bath Road Club House

== Honours ==
1st XV:

- Somerset Senior Cup winners (10): 1973, 1977, 1992, 1993, 1994, 1996, 1997, 1999, 2005, 2006
- South West 1 champions: 1996–97
- London 1 v South West 1 promotion play-off winners: 2004–05

2nd XV:

- Somerset 2 South champions: 2006–07
- Somerset 1 champions: 2015–16

3rd XV:

- Somerset 3 South champions: 2006–07
