= Hornets RFC =

Rugby union team in Somerset, England

(England) Hornets
- Full name: Hornets Rugby Football Club
- Union: Somerset RFU
- Founded: 1962; 64 years ago
- Location: Weston-super-Mare, Somerset, England
- Ground: The Nest (Capacity: 1,100 (100 in stand))
- Chairman: Stuart Simmons
- President: Neil Cowlin
- Coach: Jack Gadd (Headcoach)
- Captain: Matthew Parker
- League: National League 2 West
- 2025–26: 6th
Team kit

Official website
- www.hornetsrfc.co.uk

Hornets Rugby Football Club is an English rugby union team based in Weston-super-Mare, Somerset. The club runs three senior teams, a ladies team and the full range of junior teams. The first XV currently play in National Two West following their promotion from the South West Premier in 2022. The club also has a second XV which plays in the Tribute Somerset Premier and a third XV which plays in the Tribute Somerset 2 North. They are one of two rugby clubs in the town –- the other being Weston-super-Mare RFC.

== Ground ==
The Nest (formerly Hutton Moor Park) is located in the Hutton Moor neighbourhood at the heart of the Weston-super-Mare. The ground has good access, being next to the A370 and around 15 minutes walk from Weston Milton railway station. Facilities include a club house, parking for up to 80 cars, two full size rugby pitches with floodlights, the main pitch having an artificial grass surface, and a small covered stand for spectators. Capacity around the main pitch is approximately 1,100 - 100 in the covered stand and a further 1,000 standing pitch side.

== Current standings ==
2026–27 National League 2 West table
Pos	Team	Pld	W	D	L	PF	PA	PD	TB	LB	Pts	Qualification
1	Redruth	6	6	0	0	265	121	+144	5	0	29	Promotion place
2	Taunton Titans	6	5	0	1	264	132	+132	5	1	26	Promotion play-off
3	Hinckley	6	5	0	1	253	108	+145	5	0	25	
4	Luctonians	6	5	0	1	198	129	+69	5	0	25	
5	Clifton	6	5	0	1	240	189	+51	5	0	25	
6	Lymm	6	4	0	2	198	202	−4	5	1	22	
7	Old Redcliffians	6	3	0	3	194	188	+6	5	1	18	
8	Cinderford	6	3	0	3	222	250	−28	5	0	17	
9	Loughborough Students	6	2	0	4	197	236	−39	5	1	14	
10	Hornets	6	1	0	5	180	200	−20	4	4	12	
11	Barnstaple	6	2	0	4	139	174	−35	2	1	11	
12	Bournville	6	1	0	5	212	348	−136	5	1	10	Relegation play-off
13	Devonport Services	6	0	0	6	145	294	−149	3	1	4	Relegation place
14	Exeter University	6	0	0	6	140	276	−136	2	0	2	Relegation place

Updated to match(es) played on 5 September 2026. Source: National League Rugby
Rules for classification: If teams are level at any stage, tiebreakers are applied in the following order:
1. Number of matches won
2. Number of matches drawn
3. Difference between points for and against
4. Total number of points for
5. Aggregate number of points scored in matches between tied teams
6. Number of matches won excluding the first match, then the second and so on until the tie is settled

== Honours ==
1st team:

- Somerset 1 champions: 1992–93
- Somerset Senior Cup winners (5): 1995, 2015, 2016, 2018, 2022
- Western Counties North champions (2): 1998–99, 2012–13
- Bristol Combination Cup winners (3): 1999, 2003, 2020
- Somerset Premier champions: 2010–11
- South West 1 West champions (2): 2013–14, 2019–20

2nd team:

- Somerset 2 North champions: 2012–13
- Somerset 1 champions: 2014–15

3rd team:

- Somerset 3 South champions (2): 2010–11, 2012–13
