= Stothert & Pitt RFC =

English rugby union club, based in Bath

(England) Stothert & Pitt
- Full name: Stothert & Pitt Rugby Football Club
- Union: Somerset RFU
- Nickname: The Cranes
- Founded: 1903; 123 years ago
- Location: Bath, Somerset, England
- Ground: Adams Field
- League: Tribute Somerset 1
- 2018–19: Promoted from Tribute Somerset 1 (runners up)

Official website
- www.pitchero.com/clubs/stothertpitt

Stothert & Pitt RFC (Rugby Football Club) is a men's rugby union football club situated at the edge of Bath, in the county of Somerset, UK. The club was formed in 1903 and currently competes in Tribute Somerset Premier - a league at level 8 of the English rugby union system - following their promotion from Tribute Somerset 1 at the end of the 2018–19 season.

== Honours ==
1st XV:

- Somerset 2 champions: 1990–91
- Somerset Premier champions: 2013–14

2nd XV:

- Somerset 3 North champions (2): 2013–14, 2019–20

== See also ==
- Stothert & Pitt
