= Stockwood =

Area of Bristol, England

Coordinates: 51.4147°N 2.5410°W

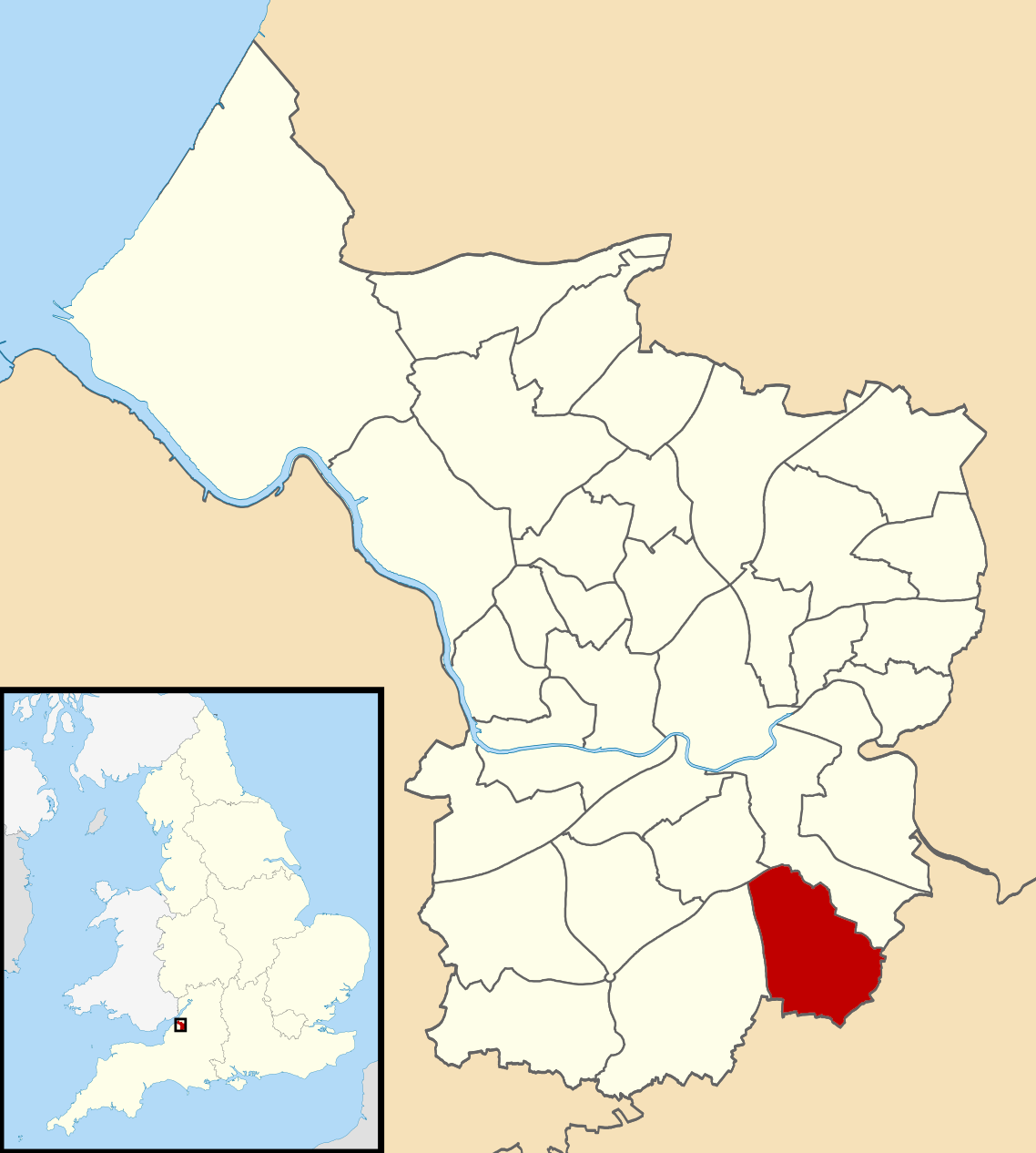
- Boundaries of the city council ward since 2016
- Population: 10,802
- OS grid reference: ST624685
- Unitary authority: Bristol
- Ceremonial county: Bristol
- Region: South West
- Country: England
- Sovereign state: United Kingdom
- Post town: BRISTOL
- Postcode district: BS14
- Dialling code: 01275
- Police: Avon and Somerset
- Fire: Avon
- Ambulance: South Western
- UK Parliament: Bristol East

Stockwood is a residential area and council ward in south Bristol, between Whitchurch and Brislington, and west of the Somerset town of Keynsham.

== Geography ==
Stockwood forms an outermost southern suburb of the city with much green space; the upper part of Stockwood is set on a plateau surrounded by pasture and the lower part a wooded valley, bordered to its west by the old Bristol and North Somerset Railway rail line which is now a cycle way.

The upper estate was built in the 1960s as private housing, together with sheltered elderly accommodation.

On a green-space ridge in front of the pantile-style shopping-precinct there is a good view of the city and events such as the Bristol International Balloon Fiesta. Below this green space, the rest of Stockwood consists of an earlier estate of previous council housing set on the sides of a steep valley.

== Community ==
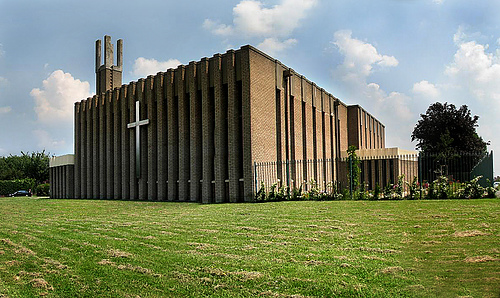
Christ the Servant church in Stockwood, Bristol.

Population of about 11,800.

There are two public houses located in Stockwood: The Concorde on Stockwood Lane and The Harvesters on Harrington Road. The uniquely named 'Man in Space' pub was redeveloped to make way for more residential houses and The Antelope was redeveloped to make way for flats.

There are two churches on this upper area: Stockwood Free Church (Baptist) and Christ the Servant (Anglican). There is also a public library, clinic, dentistry practice, vet, optician and pharmacies at the upper shops, together with several different fast-food outlets.

There is a Stockwood Community Facebook Page, where members of the Stockwood community can connect with one another, local businesses and events.

== Sport ==
Bristol Telephones F.C. and Bristol Telephone Area RFC play at the BTRA Sports Ground on Stockwood Lane. Bristol Telephones FC are members of the Western Football League Division One. The Phones Rugby Team play in Somerset RFU Division II North. The club is open to non-members and holds regular events such as Stockfest a yearly Music festival and an annual Firework Night. There are stables and horse riding as well as the nearby Horseworld. There is indoor bowls and other social activities at the Anglican Church. There are two Community Centres. Stockwood is home to Stockwood women's football team who play at the Blueprint stadium, BS14 8SJ. They play in the Eastern Division of the South West Regional Women's Football League. The nearest cricket club is St Mary Redcliffe CC who play at Old Reds Rugby Club off Scotland Lane.

== Youth ==
There are local Scout and Guides and a Church Lads' and Church Girls' Brigade. There are two primary schools serving the area as well as nurseries.

== Stockwood Open Space ==
Stockwood Open Space is a local nature reserve. It is an expanse of old farmland and ancient woodland providing a blend of old meadows, thick hedges and woodlands on lime-rich clay soils. It is owned by Bristol City Council and managed as a nature reserve in partnership with the Avon Wildlife Trust. Cowslip, Dyer's greenweed, common spotted orchids and bird's-foot trefoil are amongst the flowers to be found, and numerous butterflies include meadow brown, marbled white and large skipper. The wood known as Ilsyngrove is very old and the home of bluebell, yellow archangel and the rare Bath asparagus. Birds including whitethroats, kestrels and sparrowhawks are often seen. Two farm ponds are homes for frogs, toads and newts.
