= Chard RFC =

English rugby union team

(England) Chard
- Full name: Chard Rugby Football Club
- Union: Somerset RFU
- Nickname: The Eagles
- Founded: 1876; 149 years ago
- Location: Chard, Somerset, England
- Ground(s): Essex Close, Chard, TA20 1RH.
- Chairman: Billy Ellens
- President: Glyn Hughes
- Coach: Ben Thomas (Head Coach) Trae Gosling (1st Team Coach)
- Captain: 1st XV Luke Aplin -2nd XV Arron Lewis -3rd XV Kevin George -Ladies XV Lucy Gosden
- Most caps: Nick Hyslop (2017/18) Max Gosden (2018/19)
- Top scorer: Joe Mainwaring & Luke Hill (2017/18) Emil Szydelko (2018/19)
- League: Counties 1 Western North
- 2024–25: 8th
Team kit

Official website
- www.chardrugby.co.uk

Chard Rugby Football Club is an English rugby union team based in Chard in Somerset. The club run three senior men's teams, a Ladies' XV and the full range of junior teams. The first XV play in Counties 1 Western North after being relegated from Tribute South West 1 West in 2016–17. The second XV play in Tribute Somerset 2 South, the third XV in Tribute Somerset 3 South and the Ladies currently play Friendlies .

== Honours ==
1st team:

- Somerset 3 champions: 1991–92
- Somerset 1 champions (2): 1995–96, 2002–03
- Gloucester Premier v Somerset Premier play-off winners: 2010–11
- Western Counties North champions: 2011–12
- South West 1 (east v west) promotion play-off winners: 2013–14

2nd team:

- Somerset 2 South champions: 2011–12
- Somerset 2 South champions: 2021–22

Colts team:

- Somerset U18s League champions: 2015–16
