= St Austell Brewery =

Brewery founded in 1851

- Industry: Brewing
- Founded: 1851
- Founder: Walter Hicks
- Headquarters: St Austell, England
- Key people: Kevin Georgel (Chief executive)
- Products: Beer
- Production output: 100,000 barrels
- Number of employees: 1900
- Website: www.staustellbrewery.co.uk

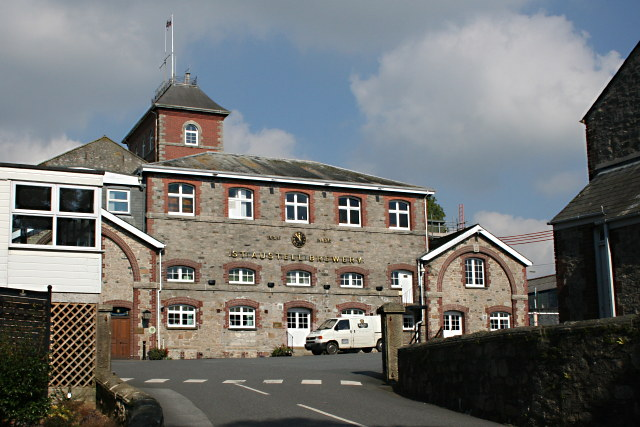
St Austell Brewery, Cornwall

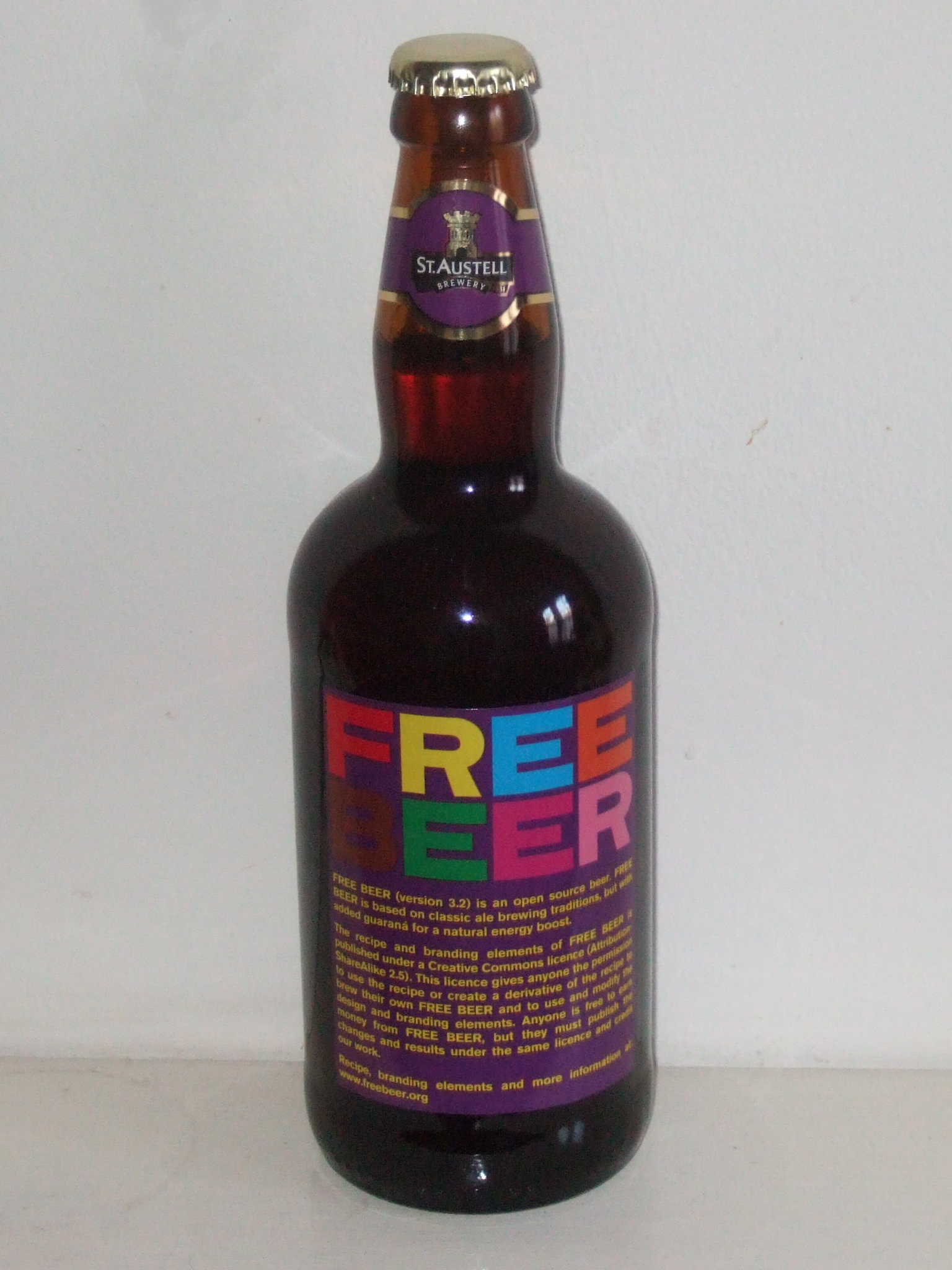
An unopened bottle of the open-source "Free Beer" which was brewed by St. Austell in 2007.

St Austell Brewery is a brewery founded in 1851 by Walter Hicks at St Austell, Cornwall, England.

== History ==
Originally named Walter Hicks & Co: brewers and wine merchants, the brewing company was renamed St Austell Brewery and significantly expanded by his daughter Hester Parnall (1868–1939), who became a director in 1911. She took over running the company on her father's death in 1916 (her husband Thomas Parnall, having died in 1915), and added nearly 80 pubs and hotels to the brewery's holdings, becoming known for "ruling the company with the grace of a duchess combined with the aplomb of a successful businessman".

The brewery's flagship beer is Tribute Ale, which accounts for around 80% of sales. Other popular ales include Proper Job, Tinner's Ale and Duchy Bitter.

On 1 July 2016 St Austell Brewery acquired Bath Ales. In March 2017 a multi-million pound investment in a new brewery and larger bottling and canning facilities at Bath Ales was announced. Chief executive, James Staughton, described the rationale of the investment as "to de-risk the business away from the seasonality of Cornwall. The further east we go, the more we're focused on city centres and the less seasonal the business becomes."

== Beers ==
Tribute was launched to commemorate the 1999 solar eclipse. It was originally a one-off special named Daylight Robbery, but proved to be so popular it was reintroduced as Tribute and has since won several awards around the UK.

St Austell Brewery signed a deal in 2008 with Healey's Cornish Cyder Farm, near Truro, to help keg and distribute Rattler Cyder and Rattler Pear Cyder for five years.

St Austell Brewery also produces Cornish IPA, which is bottle-conditioned and sold in Marks and Spencer stores and its other products include:

- Proper Job IPA (4.5% cask, 5.5% bottled) - also sold as M&S Cornish IPA at a strength of 5%
- Black Prince (4%)
- Trelawny (3.8%)
- HSD (Hicks Special Draught) (5.0%)
- Dartmoor Best Bitter (3.5%)
- Korev Cornish Lager (4.8%)
- Big Job IPA (7.2%)
- Mena Dhu (Cornish Stout) (4.5%)
- Tribute Cornish Pale Ale (4.2%)
- Anthem British Pale Ale (3.8%)
- Cornish Best (3.4%)
- Tribute Extra Strong Pale Ale (5.2%)
- Proper Black Black IPA (6.0%)
- Black Square Imperial Stout (11%)
- Cardinal Syn (7.8%)
- Bad Habit (8.2%)
- Divine Intervention (13%)
- Sayzon Belgium Farmhouse Ale (5.9%)
- Baobab Wheat Beer (5.3%)
- Secret Santa (4.3%)

The brewery previously produced the winter warmer Cripple Dick (11.7% ABV).
