= North Gloucestershire Combination =

- Full name: North Gloucestershire Combination
- Union: Gloucestershire RFU
- Founded: 1913; 112 years ago
- Region: Gloucester
- President: Stan Fritchley

Official website
- www.pitchero.com/clubs/northgloucestercombination

The North Gloucestershire Combination is the governing body for the sport of rugby union in the city of Gloucester and surrounding area in the county of Gloucestershire, England. The combination is responsible for organising clubs and cup competitions in the city of Gloucester and surrounding area, but is ultimately part of the Gloucestershire Rugby Football Union, which has overall control over rugby union in the county. Although there is no senior men's team (they are only eligible for the Gloucestershire county side), there are North Combination junior sides (under-16), as well as a vets team.

== History ==
Although the North Gloucestershire Combination was not officially formed until early in the 20th century, rugby union was already popular in the region with Gloucester Rugby having come into existence in 1873. Gloucester were then, as now, the biggest club in the county, but still needed the support of junior club sides to bolster their team in the case of injuries and other such selection crisis's. A solution of sorts was to introduce a competition for local club sides to help develop rugby union in the city and increase the number and quality of potential players that could one day represent Gloucester. The first cup competition was introduced in 1893–94 and was known simply as the 'Challenge Cup'. Early records of this Challenge Cup are scarce but it the early competition format appears to be that of a league, with the teams taking part considered part of the Gloucester League, even though sides from other towns such as Stroud and Cheltenham took part. Of the first clubs to take part in the new competition, only Gordon League and Painswick are still members of the North Gloucestershire Combination, although other club sides such as Stroud are still active, albeit in neighbouring combinations.

During the 1903–04 season the Senior Cup was introduced for the first time, with the inaugural winners being Berkley. During this period the local junior clubs were becoming disillusioned by the competition as it was not particularly well organised, results were not recorded properly and Gloucester Rugby were seen to be the beneficiaries to the detriment of the smaller clubs, who felt they were not being looked after properly. This would ultimately lead to the Gloucestershire RFU having to step in. In 1912 the Gloucester & District Combination was formed, containing 10 clubs including Gordon League and Painswick. A year later the name was changed to the North Gloucestershire Combination due to the involvement of sides from nearby towns such Cheltenham and Stroud. During the 1913–14 season a second cup competition known as the Junior Cup was introduced for A sides and was won by St Marks.

While several clubs would leave to join neighbouring combinations such as Cheltenham & District and Stroud & District in the period between and following the World Wars, the North Gloucestershire Combination would grow in size, with sides such Spartans (1927), Old Centralians (1937), Coney Hill (1947) and Matson (1957) coming into existence. Many of the clubs had enough players to field multiple teams and by the 1974–75 season a third cup competition known as the Glanville Cup was introduced for third teams, named after the competition's sponsor, Brian Glanville of Glanville Tires. Despite the game becoming professional in the 1980s and league rugby becoming increasingly important as the game approached the 21st century, the North Gloucestershire Combination cup competitions have proven to be popular with local teams, the prospect of a final at Kingsholm Stadium still being a big incentive.

== Affiliated clubs ==
There are currently 17 clubs affiliated with the North Gloucestershire Combination, with teams at both senior and junior level. This clubs are also affiliated with the Gloucestershire RFU. Note that although Gloucester Rugby are a member of the combination they do not actually take part in any of the competitions, as they operate at too high a level. They do however, enable their home ground of Kingsholm to be used for the combination cup finals.

- Brockworth
- Chosen Hill Former Pupils
- Coney Hill
- Dowty
- Gloucester All Blues
- Gloucester Old Boys
- Gloucester Rugby
- Gordon League
- Hardwicke & Quedgeley Harlequins
- Hucclecote
- Longlevens
- Matson
- Old Centralians
- Old Cryptians
- Old Richians
- Spartans
- Widden Old Boys

== Combination club competitions ==
The North Gloucestershire Combination currently runs the following club competitions:

=== Cups ===
- North Gloucestershire Senior Cup – founded in 1903 for club sides based in Gloucester between tiers 5–11
- North Gloucestershire Junior Cup – founded in 1913 for 2nd teams
- North Gloucestershire Glanville Cup – founded in 1975 for 3rd teams

== See also ==
- Gloucestershire RFU
- Bristol Combination
- English rugby union system
- History of the English rugby union system
