= South West 1 East =

English, level six, rugby union league

- Sport: Rugby union
- Instituted: 1987 (as South West 2)
- Ceased: 2022
- Number of teams: 14
- Country: England
- Holders: Oxford Harlequins (3rd title) (2021–22 (promoted to South West Premier))
- Most titles: Maidenhead (4 titles)
- Website: englandrugby.com

South West 1 East was an English, level six, rugby union league in south and south-west England; mainly Bedfordshire, Berkshire, Buckinghamshire, Dorset, Gloucester, Northamptonshire, Oxfordshire, Warwickshire and Wiltshire. Originally a single division known as South West 2, it was split into two regional leagues in 1996 – South West 1 East and South West 1 West.

The champions were promoted to South West Premier (formerly National League 3 South West) and the runner-up played the second team in South West 1 West, with the winning team gaining promotion. Relegated sides were usually relegated to one of the two seventh-tier leagues (depending on location) – Southern Counties North or Southern Counties South.

== 2021–22 ==
The teams competing in 2021–22 achieved their places in the league based on performances in 2019–20, the 'previous season' column in the table below refers to that season not 2020–21. Old Patesians finished 9th in season 2019–20 but were level transferred to South West 1 West.

=== Participating teams and locations ===
Team	Ground	Capacity	Town/Area	Previous season
Banbury	Bodicote Park	2,500 (250 seats)	Banbury, Oxfordshire	3rd
Beaconsfield	Oak Lodge Meadow		Beaconsfield, Buckinghamshire	10th
Bracknell	Lily Hill	1,250 (250 seats)	Bracknell, Berkshire	Relegated from SW Premier (13th)
Buckingham	Floyd Field		Maids Moreton, Buckingham, Buckinghamshire	7th
Chippenham	Allington Fields	9500	Chippenham, Wiltshire	8th
Frome	Gypsy Lane		Frome, Somerset	Promoted from Southern Counties South (runner-up)
Grove	Cane Lane		Grove, Oxfordshire	Promoted from Southern Counties South (champions)
Marlborough	The Common		Marlborough, Wiltshire	5th
Newbury Blues	Monk's Lane	8,000	Newbury, Berkshire	Relegated from SW Premier (12th)
Oxford Harlequins	Horspath Sports Ground	1,000	Oxford, Oxfordshire	4th
Sherborne	Gainsborough Park		Sherborne, Dorset	6th
Trowbridge	Doric Park	9550	Hilperton, Trowbridge, Wiltshire	12th
Windsor	Home Park		Windsor, Berkshire	11th
Witney	Witney Road		Hailey, Witney, Oxfordshire	Promoted from Southern Counties North (champions)

Locations of the 2021–22 South West 1 East teams

=== League table ===
2021–22 South West 1 East League table
Pos	Team	Pld	W	D	L	PF	PA	PD	TB	LB	Pts	Qualification
1	Oxford Harlequins	26	25	0	1	1046	398	+648	20	1	116 (Note: 5 points deducted)	Promotion place
2	Banbury	26	23	0	3	996	398	+598	17	2	113	
3	Bracknell	26	21	0	5	807	379	+428	20	3	107	
4	Newbury Blues	26	18	1	7	867	426	+441	14	7	95	
5	Witney	26	12	0	14	633	622	+11	13	6	67	
6	Trowbridge	26	12	1	13	534	708	−174	9	3	63	
7	Beaconsfield	26	13	0	13	562	640	−78	7	2	61	
8	Chippenham	26	10	0	16	647	820	−173	14	4	58	
9	Marlborough	25	11	1	13	659	620	+39	11	7	54 (Note: 10 points deducted)	
10	Sherborne	26	14	0	12	496	462	+34	8	4	44 (Note: 25 points deducted)	
11	Windsor	25	6	0	19	410	874	−464	6	3	33	
12	Frome	26	5	0	21	405	756	−351	5	7	32	
13	Grove	26	6	1	19	455	900	−445	8	2	31	
14	Buckingham	26	3	0	23	425	939	−514	6	8	26	

Updated to match(es) played on 8 June 2022. Source:
Rules for classification: Points are awarded as follows: four points for a win; two points for a draw; no points for a loss; one bonus point for scoring four tries or more in a match; one bonus point for losing by seven points or less.

If teams are level at any stage, tiebreakers are applied in the following order:

1. Number of matches won
2. Difference between points for and against
3. Total number of points for
4. Aggregate number of points scored in matches between tied teams
  Notes:

== 2020–21 ==
Due to the ongoing coronavirus pandemic the season was cancelled.

== 2019–20 ==
The season ended before all the matches were completed because of the coronavirus pandemic and the RFU used a best playing record formula to decide the final table.

=== Participating teams and locations ===
Team	Ground	Capacity	Town/Area	Previous season
Banbury	Bodicote Park	2,500 (250 seats)	Banbury, Oxfordshire	3rd
Beaconsfield	Oak Lodge Meadow		Beaconsfield, Buckinghamshire	6th
Buckingham	Floyd Field		Maids Moreton, Buckingham, Buckinghamshire	Promoted from Southern Counties North (play-off)
Chippenham	Allington Fields	500	Chippenham, Wiltshire	8th
Marlborough	The Common		Marlborough, Wiltshire	4th
Old Centralians	Saintbridge Sports Centre		Gloucester, Gloucestershire	Runner-up (lost play-off)
Old Patesians	Everest Road		Cheltenham, Gloucestershire	Relegated from South West Premier (14th)
Oxford Harlequins	Horspath Sports Ground	1,000	Oxford, Oxfordshire	10th
Royal Wootton Bassett	Ballard's Ash Sports Ground	5,000	Wootton Bassett, Wiltshire	5th
Salisbury	Castle Road	1,500	Salisbury, Wiltshire	7th
Sherborne	Gainsborough Park		Sherborne, Dorset	Promoted from Southern Counties South (champions)
Trowbridge	Doric Park		Hilperton, Trowbridge, Wiltshire	11th
Wimborne	Leigh Park		Wimborne, Dorset	9th
Windsor	Home Park		Windsor, Berkshire	Promoted from Southern Counties North (champions)

Locations of the 2019–20 South West 1 East teams

=== League table ===
2019–20 South West 1 East League Table (to 16 March 2020, when play stopped due to COVID-19)
Pos	Team	Pld	W	D	L	PF	PA	PD	TB	LB	Pts	
1	Old Centralians (P)	22	20	0	2	831	299	+532	19	1	101	Promotion place
2	Royal Wootton Bassett (P)	22	19	1	2	670	301	+369	15	1	94	Play-off place
3	Banbury	22	17	1	4	763	362	+401	13	1	84	
4	Oxford Harlequins	22	13	1	8	734	536	+198	14	5	73	
5	Marlborough	22	12	0	10	587	554	+33	13	5	66	
6	Sherborne	22	12	1	9	512	428	+84	7	5	62	
7	Buckingham	22	12	0	10	655	593	+62	9	4	61	
8	Chippenham	22	10	0	12	576	608	−32	13	5	58	
9	Old Patesians	22	9	0	13	529	589	−60	11	1	48	
10	Beaconsfield Rugby Club	22	8	0	14	578	725	−147	10	3	45	
11	Windsor	22	8	0	14	470	602	−132	8	3	43	
12	Trowbridge	22	6	0	16	392	821	−429	5	4	33	
13	Wimborne	22	5	0	17	343	671	−328	7	3	30	Relegation place
14	Salisbury	22	1	0	21	325	876	−551	3	3	5 (Note: 5 points deducted)	Relegation place

Updated to match(es) played on 2 November 2021. Source:
Rules for classification: Points are awarded as follows: four points for a win; two points for a draw; no points for a loss;
one bonus point for scoring four tries or more in a match; one bonus point for losing by seven points or less.

If teams are level at any stage, tiebreakers are applied in the following order:

1. Number of matches won
2. Difference between points for and against
3. Total number of points for
4. Aggregate number of points scored in matches between tied teams
  Notes:

Final positions (after point adjustments)
Pos	Team	Pts^{*}
1	Old Centralians	119
2	Royal Wootton Bassett	111
3	Banbury	99
4	Oxford Harlequins	86
5	Marlborough	78
6	Sherborne	73
7	Buckingham	72
8	Chippenham	69
9	Old Patesians	54
10	Beaconsfield	53
11	Windsor	52
12	Trowbridge	39
13	Wimborne	37
14	Salisbury	7

== 2018–19 ==
Team	Ground	Capacity	Town/Area	Previous season
Banbury	Bodicote Park	2,500 (250 seats)	Banbury, Oxfordshire	Runners up (lost playoff)
Beaconsfield	Oak Lodge Meadow		Beaconsfield, Buckinghamshire	Promoted from Southern Counties North (champions)
Chippenham	Allington Fields	500	Chippenham, Wiltshire	3rd
Marlborough	The Common		Marlborough, Wiltshire	Promoted from Southern Counties South (playoff)
Newbury Blues	Monk's Lane	8,000	Newbury, Berkshire	Relegated from South West Premier (12th)
Old Centralians	Saintbridge Sports Centre		Gloucester, Gloucestershire	7th
Oxford Harlequins	Horspath Sports Ground	1,000	Oxford, Oxfordshire	4th
Royal Wootton Bassett	Ballard's Ash Sports Ground	5,000	Wootton Bassett, Wiltshire	6th
Salisbury	Castle Road	1,500	Salisbury, Wiltshire	5th
Stratford-upon-Avon	Pearcecorft		Stratford-upon-Avon, Warwickshire	9th
Swindon	Greenbridge Road		Swindon, Wiltshire	11th
Trowbridge	Doric Park		Hilperton, Trowbridge, Wiltshire	Promoted from Southern Counties South (champions)
Wimborne	Leigh Park		Wimborne, Dorset	10th
Witney	Witney Road		Hailey, Witney, Oxfordshire	8th

=== Participating teams and locations ===
Locations of the 2018–19 South West 1 East teams

=== Promotion play-off ===
This seasons play-off for promotion to the South West Premier was between Launceston and Old Centralians. Launceston had the better playing record and hosted the match at Polson Bridge, winning 33 – 22. This was the 19th play-off match, the first for Launceston and the second for Old Centralians who won promotion in 2013 beating Camborne by 25 – 15. It was the 13th win for the home team and south-west teams have also won the match on 13 occasions.

Team	Pld	W	D	L	PF	PA	PD	TB	LB	Pts
Launceston	26	21	0	5	835	520	+315	17	3	106
Old Centralians	26	21	0	5	809	472	+337	15	2	101

27 April 2018

Launceston	33 – 22	Old Centralians

Polson Bridge, Launceston
Attendance: 1000+

== 2017–18 ==
=== Participating teams and location ===
The 2017–18 South West 1 East consisted of fourteen teams; five from Oxfordshire, four from Wiltshire, two from Gloucestershire and one each from Buckinghamshire, Dorset and Warwickshire. Nine of the fourteen teams participated in last season's competition.

Team	Ground	Capacity	Town/Area	Previous season
Banbury	Bodicote Park	2,500 (250 seats)	Banbury, Oxfordshire	6th
Bicester	Oxford Road		Bicester, Oxfordshire	Promoted from Southern Counties North (play-off)
Chippenham	Allington Fields	500	Chippenham, Wiltshire	9th
Grove	Cane Lane		Grove, Oxfordshire	11th
Marlow	Riverwoods Drive		Marlow, Buckinghamshire	Promoted from Southern Counties North (champions)
Old Centralians	Saintbridge Sports Centre		Gloucester, Gloucestershire	4th
Old Patesians	Everest Road		Cheltenham, Gloucestershire	3rd
Oxford Harlequins	Marston Ferry Road		Oxford, Oxfordshire	10th
Royal Wootton Bassett	Ballard's Ash Sports Ground	5,000	Wootton Bassett, Wiltshire	8th
Salisbury	Castle Road	1,500	Salisbury, Wiltshire	Relegated from National League 3 South West (13th)
Stratford-upon-Avon	Pearcecorft		Stratford-upon-Avon, Warwickshire	Level transfer from Midlands 1 West (5th)
Swindon	Greenbridge Road		Swindon, Wiltshire	7th
Wimborne	Leigh Park		Wimborne, Dorset	Promoted from Southern Counties South (champions)
Witney	Witney Road		Hailey, Witney, Oxfordshire	5th

Locations of the 2017–18 South West 1 East teams

== 2016–17 ==
=== Participating teams and location ===
The 2016–17 South West 1 East consisted of fourteen teams; five from Berkshire, four from Oxfordshire, three from Wiltshire and two from Gloucestershire. Eight of the fourteen teams participated in last season's competition. The season started on 3 September 2016 and the last league matches were played on 22 April 2017. The play-off match was played a week later on 29 April 2017.

Team	Ground	Capacity	Town/Village	Previous season
Banbury	Bodicote Park	2,500 (250 seats)	Banbury, Oxfordshire	promoted from Midlands 2 West (South) (champions)
Chippenham	Allington Fields	500	Chippenham, Wiltshire	relegated from National League 3 South West (14th)
Grove	Cane Lane		Grove, Oxfordshire	10th
Maidenhead	Braywick Park	1,750	Maidenhead, Berkshire	5th
Newbury Blues	Monk's Lane	8,000	Newbury, Berkshire	3rd
Old Centralians	Saintbridge Sports Centre		Gloucester, Gloucestershire	relegated from National League 3 South West (12th)
Old Patesians	Everest Road		Cheltenham, Gloucestershire	relegated from National League 3 South West (13th)
Oxford Harlequins	Marston Ferry Road		Oxford, Oxfordshire	6th
Reading	Holme Park		Sonning, Reading, Berkshire	11th
Reading Abbey	Rosehill		Emmer Green, Reading, Berkshire	promoted from Southern Counties North (champions)
Royal Wootton Bassett	Ballard's Ash Sports Ground	5,000	Wootton Bassett, Wiltshire	promoted from Southern Counties South (champions)
Swindon	Greenbridge Road		Swindon, Wiltshire	7th
Windsor	Home Park		Windsor, Berkshire	8th
Witney	Witney Road		Hailey, Witney, Oxfordshire	4th

Locations of the 2016–17 South West 1 East teams

=== League table ===
2016–17 South West 1 East final table
Pos	Team	Pld	W	D	L	PF	PA	PD	TB	LB	Pts	Qualification
1	Maidenhead (P)	26	22	0	4	916	453	+463	20	4	112	Promotion place
2	Newbury Blues (P)	26	21	1	4	894	401	+493	17	2	105	Play-off place
3	Old Patesians	26	21	0	5	726	416	+310	14	3	101	
4	Old Centralians	26	13	2	11	683	619	+64	13	3	72	
5	Witney	26	13	0	13	546	646	−100	10	6	68	
6	Banbury	26	12	2	12	536	631	−95	7	3	62	
7	Swindon	26	11	1	14	544	587	−43	9	5	60	
8	Royal Wootton Bassett	26	11	0	15	548	536	+12	8	4	56	
9	Chippenham	26	10	0	16	602	723	−121	11	5	56	
10	Oxford Harlequins	26	11	1	14	515	700	−185	6	3	55	
11	Grove	26	10	1	15	488	593	−105	7	6	55	
12	Windsor	26	9	1	16	504	669	−165	8	6	52	Relegation place
13	Reading Abbey	26	10	1	15	471	585	−114	4	4	50	Relegation place
14	Reading	26	3	0	23	294	708	−414	1	7	20	Relegation place

Updated to match(es) played on 1 June 2017. Source:
Rules for classification: Points are awarded as follows: four points for a win; two points for a draw; no points for a loss; one bonus point for scoring four tries or more in a match; one bonus point for losing by seven points or less.

If teams are level at any stage, tiebreakers are applied in the following order:

1. Number of matches won
2. Difference between points for and against
3. Total number of points for
4. Aggregate number of points scored in matches between tied teams

=== Promotion play-off ===
Each season, the runners-up in South West 1 East and Tribute South West 1 West, participate in a play-off for promotion to National League 3 South West. The team with the best playing record, in this case Newbury, hosted the match and they beat their opponents Clevedon 25 – 22.

Team	Pld	W	D	L	PF	PA	PD	TA	TB	LB	Pts
Newbury Blues (P)	26	21	1	4	894	401	+493	0	17	2	105
Clevedon	26	20	1	5	908	356	+552	0	12	5	99

29 April 2017
15:00

Newbury Blues	25 – 22	Cleveland
	Newbury

Monks Lane

== 2015–16 ==
The 2015–16 South West 1 East consisted of fourteen teams; four from Berkshire, three from Oxfordshire, three from Wiltshire and one each from Bedfordshire, Buckinghamshire, Dorset and Northamptonshire. The season started on 5 September 2015 and ended on 23 April 2016. Towcestrians finished in first place and were promoted to National League 3 South West for next season, along with the runner-up and play-off winner Salisbury.

=== Participating teams and location ===
Ten of the fourteen teams participated in last season's competition. The 2014–15 champions Chippenham were promoted to National League 3 South West while Bletchley and Buckingham were relegated to Southern Counties North and Devizes to Southern Counties South.

Team	Ground	Capacity	Town/Village	Previous season
Grove	Cane Lane		Grove, Oxfordshire	10th
High Wycombe	Kingsmead Road		High Wycombe, Buckinghamshire	promoted from Southern Counties North (champions)
Leighton Buzzard	Wright's Meadow		Leighton Buzzard, Bedfordshire	7th
Maidenhead	Braywick Park	1,750	Maidenhead, Berkshire	11th
Newbury Blues	Monk's Lane	8,000	Newbury, Berkshire	6th
Oxford Harlequins	Marston Ferry Road		Oxford, Oxfordshire	relegated from National League 3 South West (13th)
Reading	Holme Park		Sonning, Reading, Berkshire	9th
Salisbury	Castle Road	1,500	Salisbury, Wiltshire	promoted from Southern Counties South (play-off)
Swanage & Wareham	Bestwall Road		Wareham, Dorset	promoted from Southern Counties South (champions)
Swindon	Greenbridge Road		Swindon, Wiltshire	4th
Towcestrians	Greens Norton Road		Towchester, Northamptonshire	2nd (lost promotion play-off)
Trowbridge	Doric Park		Hilperton, Trowbridge, Wiltshire	8th
Windsor	Home Park		Windsor, Berkshire	3rd
Witney	Witney Road		Hailey, Witney, Oxfordshire	5th

Locations of the 2015–16 South West 1 East teams

=== League table ===
2015–16 South West 1 East final table
Pos	Team	Pld	W	D	L	PF	PA	PD	TB	LB	Pts	Qualification
1	Towcestrians (P)	26	21	1	4	980	310	+670	19	1	106	Promotion place
2	Salisbury (P)	26	20	1	5	732	395	+337	11	3	96	Play-off place
3	Newbury Blues	26	21	1	4	583	260	+323	7	1	94	
4	Witney	26	18	0	8	717	379	+338	12	4	88	
5	Maidenhead	26	16	1	9	662	454	+208	10	4	80	
6	Oxford Harlequins	26	16	2	8	559	493	+66	9	2	79	
7	Swindon	26	11	2	13	592	583	+9	11	5	64	
8	Windsor	26	12	0	14	554	635	−81	10	4	62	
9	Leighton Buzzard	26	11	0	15	549	588	−39	7	5	56	
10	Grove	26	8	0	18	452	718	−266	6	5	43	
11	Reading	26	6	1	19	446	592	−146	5	8	39	
12	High Wycombe	26	7	1	18	418	849	−431	5	3	38	Relegation place
13	Trowbridge	26	7	0	19	340	750	−410	2	5	35	Relegation place
14	Swanage & Wareham	26	3	0	23	338	916	−578	1	4	17	Relegation place

Updated to match(es) played on 28 May 2016. Source:
Rules for classification: Points are awarded as follows: four points for a win; two points for a draw; no points for a loss; one bonus point for scoring four tries or more in a match; one bonus point for losing by seven points or less.

If teams are level at any stage, tiebreakers are applied in the following order:

1. Number of matches won
2. Difference between points for and against
3. Total number of points for
4. Aggregate number of points scored in matches between tied teams

=== Promotion play-off ===
Each season, the runners-up in South West 1 East and Tribute South West 1 West, participate in a play-off for promotion to National League 3 South West. The team with the best playing record, in this case Salisbury, hosted the match and they beat their opponents Thornbury 26 – 24.

Team	Pld	W	D	L	PF	PA	PD	TA	TB	LB	Pts
Salisbury (P)	26	20	1	5	732	395	+337	0	11	3	96
Thornbury	26	19	0	7	779	411	+368	0	14	5	95

30 April 2016
15:00

Salisbury	26 – 24	Thornbury

Castle Road
Attendance: 500

== Teams 2014–15 ==
- Bletchley – promoted from Southern Counties North
- Buckingham
- Chippenham – relegated from National League 3 South West
- Devizes
- Grove
- Leighton Buzzard
- Maidenhead
- Newbury Blues
- Reading
- Swindon
- Towcestrians
- Trowbridge – promoted from Southern Counties South
- Windsor
- Witney

== Teams 2013–14 ==
- Buckingham
- Cheltenham
- Devizes – promoted from Southern Counties South
- Grove – promoted from Southern Counties North
- Maidenhead – relegated from National League 3 South West
- Marlow
- Newbury Blues
- Oxford Harlequins – relegated from National League 3 South West
- Reading
- Salisbury
- Swindon
- Towcestrians - transferred from Midlands 1 East
- Windsor
- Witney

== Teams 2012–13 ==
- Bletchley
- Bracknell
- Cheltenham
- Coney Hill
- High Wycombe
- Marlow
- Newbury Blues – relegated from National League 3 South West
- Old Centralians
- Reading
- Salisbury
- Swanage & Wareham
- Swindon
- Windsor
- Witney

== Original teams ==
When league rugby began in 1987 this division (known as South West 2) contained the following teams:

- Barnstaple
- Berry Hill
- Brixham
- Cinderford
- Devon & Cornwall Police
- Devonport Services
- Henley
- Launceston
- Newbury
- Reading
- Reading Abbey

== South West 1 East honours ==
=== South West 2 (1987–1993) ===
Originally South West 1 East and South West 1 West were combined in a single division called South West 2. It was a tier 6 league with promotion up to South West 1 and relegation down to either Western Counties (Note: Western Counties is currently split into regional divisions known as Western Counties North and Western Counties West.) or Southern Counties (Note: Southern Counties is currently split into two regional divisions known as Southern Counties North and Southern Counties South.).

South West 2
Season	No of teams	No of matches	Champions	Runners-up	Relegated teams	Ref
1987–88	11	10	Berry Hill	Reading	Newbury, Devonport Services	
1988–89	11	10	Matson	Brixham	Launceston, Devon & Cornwall Police	
1989–90	11	10	Gordon League	Torquay Athletic	Bridgwater & Albion	
1990–91	11	10	Cinderford	Newbury	Redingensians, Bournemouth	
1991–92	11	10	Henley	Sherborne (Note: 3rd place Penryn also promoted.)	Reading Abbey	
1992–93	13	12	Stroud	Barnstaple	Old Culverhaysians	

=== South West 2 (1993–1996) ===
The top six teams from South West 1 and the top six from London 1 were combined to create National 5 South, meaning that South West 2 dropped to become a tier 7 league. Promotion continued to South West 1 and relegation to either Western Counties (Note: Western Counties is currently split into regional divisions known as Western Counties North and Western Counties West.) or Southern Counties (Note: Southern Counties is currently split into two regional divisions known as Southern Counties North and Southern Counties South.).

South West 2
Season	No of teams	No of matches	Champions	Runners-up	Relegated teams	Ref
1993–94	13	12	Gloucester Old Boys	Taunton	Windsor	
1994–95	13	12	Matson	Bridgwater & Albion	Marlow	
1995–96	13	12	Launceston	Stroud	No relegation (Note: There was no relegation this season due to restructuring of the league system by the RFU.)	

=== South West 2 East (1996–2009) ===
League restructuring by the RFU for the 1996–97 season saw South West 2 split into two regional divisions known as South West 2 East and South West 2 West, and the cancellation of National 5 South meant that both divisions became tier 6 leagues. Promotion continued to South West 1, while relegation was now to either Southern Counties North or Southern Counties South (Note: Southern Counties North and Southern Counties South were originally a single division known as Southern Counties.).

South West 2 East
Season	No of teams	No of matches	Champions	Runners-up	Relegated teams	Ref
1996–97	12	22	Bracknell	Swanage & Wareham	Swindon, Chippenham	
1997–98	12	22	Salisbury	Marlow	Oxford	
1998–99	12	22	Dorchester	Swanage & Wareham	Bournemouth	
1999–00	12	22	Swanage & Wareham	Chippenham	Salisbury	
2000–01	12	22	Chinnor	Slough	High Wycombe, Witney	
2001–02	12	22	Marlow	Chippenham	Olney, Redingensians, Slough	
2002–03	12	22	Oxford Harlequins	Swanage & Wareham	Grove, Amersham & Chiltern, Dorchester	
2003–04	12	22	Maidenhead	Swanage & Wareham	High Wycombe, Frome, Stow-on-the-Wold	
2004–05	14	26	Reading Abbey	Chippenham	Ivel Barbarians, Amersham & Chiltern, Windsor	
2005–06	12	26	Cleve	Swanage & Wareham	Oakmeadians, Wimborne, Keynsham	
2006–07	12	22	Redingensians	Bournemouth	Aylesbury, Swindon, Frome	
2007–08	12	22	Chippenham	Salisbury	Tadley, Windsor, Marlow	
2008–09	12	22	Maidenhead	Reading	Henley Wanderers	
Green background are the promotion places.

=== South West 1 East (2009–present) ===
League restructuring by the RFU meant that South West 2 East and South West 2 West were renamed as South West 1 East and South West 1 West, with both leagues remaining at tier 6. Promotion was to National League 3 South West (Note: National League 3 South West is currently known as South West Premier.), while relegation continued to either Southern Counties North or Southern Counties South.

South West 1 East
Season	No of teams	No of matches	Champions	Runners-up	Relegated teams	Ref
2009–10	14	26	Cheltenham	High Wycombe	Royal Wootton Bassett, Trowbridge, Salisbury	
2010–11	14	26	Amersham & Chiltern	Maidenhead	Wimborne, Oakmeadians, Wallingford	
2011–12	14	26	Maidenhead	Salisbury	Olney, Buckingham, Reading Abbey	
2012–13	14	26	Bracknell	Old Centralians	High Wycombe, Swanage & Wareham, Bletchley	
2013–14	14	26	Oxford Harlequins	Towcestrians	Salisbury, Marlow, Cheltenham	
2014–15	14	26	Chippenham	Towcestrians	Bletchley, Buckingham, Devizes	
2015–16	14	26	Towcestrians	Salisbury	Swanage & Wareham, Trowbridge, High Wycombe	
2016–17	14	26	Maidenhead	Newbury Blues	Reading, Reading Abbey, Windsor	
2017–18	14	26	Old Patesians	Banbury	Bicester, Grove, Marlow	
2018–19	14	26	Newbury Blues	Old Centralians	Stratford Upon Avon, Swindon, Witney	
2019–20	14	26	Old Centralians	Royal Wootton Bassett	Salisbury, Wimborne	
2020–21	14	Cancelled due to COVID-19 pandemic in the United Kingdom.				
2021–22	14	26	Oxford Harlequins	Banbury	Awaiting decision from the RFU	
Green background are the promotion places.

== Promotion play-offs ==
Since the 2000–01 season there has been a play-off between the runners-up of South West 1 East and South West 1 West for the third and final promotion place to South West Premier. The team with the superior league record has home advantage. As of the end of the 2019–20 season the South West 1 West teams' have been the stronger with thirteen wins to the South West 1 East teams' six, while the home team has won promotion thirteen times to the away teams six.

South West 1 (east v west) promotion play-off results
Season	Home team	Score	Away team	Venue	Attendance
2000–01	Stroud (W)	37–8	Slough (E)	Fromehall Park, Stroud, Gloucestershire	
2001–02	Chippenham (E)	5–20	Berry Hill (W)	Allington Fields, Chippenham, Wiltshire	
2002–03	Clevedon (W)	22–8	Swanage & Wareham (E)	Coleridge Vale Playing Fields, Clevedon, Somerset	
2003–04	Swanage & Wareham (E)	19–23	Penryn (W)	Bestwall Road, Dorset	
2004–05	Chippenham (E)	24–18	Coney Hill (W)	Allington Fields, Chippenham, Wiltshire	
2005–06	Swanage & Wareham (E)	10–26	St Ives (W)	Bestwall Road, Dorset	
2006–07	Bournemouth (E)	43–12	Brixham (W)	Chapel Gate, Bournemouth, Dorset	
2007–08	Barnstaple (W)	17–6	Salisbury (E)	Pottington Road, Barnstaple, Devon	
2008–09	Reading (E)	16–10	Newton Abbot (W)	Holme Park, Sonning, Reading, Berkshire	
2009–10	Newton Abbot (W)	23–14	High Wycombe (E)	Rackerhayes, Newton Abbot, Devon	
2010–11	Old Redcliffians (W)	52–8	Maidenhead (E)	Scotland Lane, Brislington, Bristol	
2011–12	Salisbury (E)	13–13 (aet) (Note: After extra time the game was tied with each sides having 2 tries each. As a result Avonmouth Old Boys were awarded the victory by virtue of being the away side.)	Avonmouth Old Boys (W)	Castle Road, Salisbury, Wiltshire	
2012–13	Old Centralians (E)	25–15	Camborne (W)	Saintbridge Sports Centre, Gloucester, Gloucestershire	500
2013–14	Towcestrians (E)	18–22	Chard (W)	Greens Norton Road, Towcester, Northamptonshire	
2014–15	Towcestrians (E)	20–25	Ivybridge (W)	Greens Norton Road, Towcester, Northamptonshire	
2015–16	Salisbury (E)	26–24	Thornbury (W)	Castle Road, Salisbury, Wiltshire	500
2016–17	Newbury Blues (E)	25−22	Clevedon (W)	Monk's Lane, Newbury, Berkshire	
2017–18	Exeter University (W)	42−31	Banbury (E)	Topsham Sports Ground, Exeter, Devon	
2018–19	Launceston (W)	33–22	Old Centralians (E)	Polson Bridge, Launceston, Cornwall	1,200
2019–20	Cancelled due to COVID-19 pandemic in the United Kingdom. Best ranked runner up - Royal Wootton Bassett (E) - promoted instead.				
2020–21	Cancelled due to COVID-19 pandemic in the United Kingdom.				
2021–22	Cancelled due to the reorganisation of the league structure				
Green backgrounds represent promoted teams. E stands for South West 1 East while W stands for South West 1 West (or SW2E/SW2W for versions prior to 2009).

== Number of league titles ==
- Maidenhead (4)
- Oxford Harlequins (3)
- Bracknell (2)
- Chippenham (2)
- Matson (2) (Note: Both of Matsons titles were won when league was known as South West 2.)
- Amersham & Chiltern (1)
- Berry Hill (1) (Note: Berry Hill's title was when league was merged as South West 2.)
- Cheltenham (1)
- Chinnor (1)
- Cinderford (1) (Note: Cinderford's title was when league was merged as South West 2.)
- Cleve (1)
- Dorchester (1)
- Gloucester Old Boys (1) (Note: Gloucester Old Boys title was when league was merged as South West 2.)
- Gordon League (1) (Note: Gordon League's title was when league was merged as South West 2.)
- Henley (1) (Note: Henley's title was when league was merged as South West 2.)
- Launceston (Note: Launceston's title was won when league was known as South West 2.)
- Marlow (1)
- Newbury Blues (1)
- Old Centralians (1)
- Old Patesians (1)
- Reading Abbey (1)
- Redingensians (1)
- Salisbury (1)
- Stroud (1) (Note: Stroud's title was when league was merged as South West 2.)
- Swanage & Wareham (1)
- Towcestrians (1)

== See also ==
- South West Division RFU
- Berkshire RFU
- Buckinghamshire RFU
- Dorset & Wilts RFU
- Eastern Counties RFU
- Oxfordshire RFU
- English rugby union system
- Rugby union in England
