= Regional 2 Severn =

Level six rugby union league in England

- Current season or competition: 2025–26 Regional 2 Severn
- Sport: Rugby union
- Instituted: 2022
- Number of teams: 12
- Country: England
- Holders: Trowbridge (2025–26 promoted to Regional 1 South West)
- Most titles: Matson; Royal Wootton Bassett; Drybrook; Trowbridge (1 title)

Regional 2 Severn is a level six league in the English rugby union system, one of twelve leagues at this level and the teams are based in counties near the River Severn. The club finishing in first place is promoted to Regional 1 South West.

Trowbridge are the current champions.

== Format ==
The twelve teams are based in counties near the River Severn, mainly Gloucestershire and Somerset, but also Berkshire, Dorset, Oxfordshire and Wiltshire. The league champions are promoted to Regional 1 South West and relegation is to one of the level seven County 1 Leagues. The season runs from September to April and comprises twenty-two rounds of matches, with each club playing each of its rivals home and away. The results of the matches contribute points to the league table as follows:

- 4 points are awarded for a win
- 2 points are awarded for a draw
- 0 points are awarded for a loss, however
- 1 losing (bonus) point is awarded to a team that loses a match by 7 points or fewer
- 1 additional (bonus) point is awarded to a team scoring 4 tries or more in a match

== 2026-27 ==
Departing were Trowbridge, promoted to Regional 1 South West while North Dorset (10th - play off losers) and Cheltenham (12th) were relegated to Counties 1 Southern South and Counties 1 Western North respectively.

| Team | Ground | Capacity | City/Area | Previous season |
|---|---|---|---|---|
| Chinnor III | Kingsey Road | 2,000 | Thame, Oxfordshire | Promoted from Counties 1 Southern North (champions) |
| Chippenham | Allington Fields | 500 | Chippenham, Wiltshire | 2nd |
| Cleve | The Hayfields | | Mangotsfield, Gloucestershire | 3rd |
| Keynsham | Bristol Road | | Keynsham, Somerset | 4th |
| Longlevens | Longford Lane | | Longlevens, Gloucestershire | 8th |
| Marlborough | The Common | | Marlborough, Wiltshire | Relegated from Regional 1 South West |
| Matson | Redwell Road | | Matson, Gloucester | Relegated from Regional 1 South West |
| Newbury Blues | Monks Lane | 8,000 | Newbury, Berkshire | 5th |
| Old Centralians | Saintbridge Sports Centre | | Gloucester, Gloucestershire | 6th |
| Royal Wootton Bassett II | Ballards Ash | 5,000 | Royal Wootton Bassett, Wiltshire | 11th |
| Thornbury | Cooper's Farm | | Thornbury, Gloucestershire | 7th |
| Witney | Hailey Road | | Witney, Oxfordshire | 9th |

Locations of the 2026-27 Regional 2 Severn teams in Somerset, Wiltshire & Gloucestershire
Locations of the 2026-27 Regional 2 Severn teams in Berkshire, Oxfordshire & Wiltshire

== 2025–26 ==
The twelve teams are drawn from across Gloucestershire (five teams), Wiltshire (three), Berkshire (one), Dorset (one), Oxfordshire (one) and Somerset (one). Departing were Drybrook, promoted to Regional 1 Midlands while Gordano (11th) and Swindon (12th) were relegated to Counties 1 Western North and Counties 1 Southern South respectively. Also leaving were Stow-on-the-Wold (6th) on a level transfer to Regional 2 Midlands West and Weston-super-Mare (7th) level transferred to Regional 2 South West.

| Team | Ground | Capacity | City/Area | Previous season |
|---|---|---|---|---|
| Cheltenham | Newlands Park | 1,000 | Southam, Cheltenham, Gloucestershire | Level transfer from Regional 2 Midlands West (6th) |
| Chippenham | Allington Fields | 500 | Chippenham, Wiltshire | 2nd |
| Cleve | The Hayfields | | Mangotsfield, Gloucestershire | Promoted from Counties 1 Western North (champions) |
| Keynsham | Bristol Road | | Keynsham, Somerset | 4th |
| Longlevens | Longford Lane | | Longlevens, Gloucestershire | 5th |
| Newbury Blues | Monks Lane | 8,000 | Newbury, Berkshire | Level transfer from Regional 2 South Central (8th) |
| North Dorset | Slaughtergate | 1,000 | Gillingham, Dorset | Level transfer from Regional 2 South Central (10th) |
| Old Centralians | Saintbridge Sports Centre | | Gloucester, Gloucestershire | 8th |
| Royal Wootton Bassett II | Ballards Ash | 5,000 | Royal Wootton Bassett, Wiltshire | Promoted from Counties 1 Southern South (champions) |
| Thornbury | Cooper's Farm | | Thornbury, Gloucestershire | 10th |
| Trowbridge | Doric Park | | Hilperton, Trowbridge, Wiltshire | 3rd |
| Witney | Hailey Road | | Witney, Oxfordshire | 9th |

Locations of the 2025–26 Regional 2 Severn teams in Somerset & Gloucestershire
Locations of the 2025–26 Regional 2 Severn teams in Berkshire, Dorset, Oxfordshire & Wiltshire

=== League table ===
Regional 2 Severn 2025–26
| | Team | Played | Won | Drawn | Lost | Points for | Points against | Points diff | Try bonus | Loss bonus | Points |
| 1 | Trowbridge (P) | 22 | 20 | 0 | 2 | 980 | 347 | 633 | 21 | 1 | 103 |
| 2 | Chippenham | 22 | 18 | 1 | 3 | 1004 | 454 | 550 | 20 | 2 | 96 |
| 3 | Cleve | 22 | 18 | 0 | 4 | 1109 | 418 | 691 | 20 | 0 | 92 |
| 4 | Keynsham | 22 | 13 | 0 | 9 | 677 | 521 | 156 | 15 | 2 | 70 |
| 5 | Newbury Blues | 22 | 12 | 1 | 9 | 654 | 809 | −155 | 12 | 2 | 64 |
| 6 | Old Centralians | 22 | 11 | 1 | 10 | 665 | 712 | −47 | 13 | 2 | 61 |
| 7 | Thornbury | 22 | 11 | 0 | 11 | 774 | 673 | 101 | 15 | 2 | 61 |
| 8 | Longlevens | 22 | 10 | 0 | 12 | 698 | 723 | −25 | 13 | 3 | 56 |
| 9 | Witney | 22 | 6 | 0 | 16 | 611 | 879 | −268 | 14 | 4 | 42 |
| 10 | North Dorset | 22 | 5 | 1 | 16 | 424 | 709 | −285 | 6 | 5 | 34 |
| 11 | Royal Wootton Bassett II | 22 | 5 | 1 | 16 | 470 | 931 | −461 | 10 | 2 | 34 |
| 12 | Cheltenham (R) | 22 | 0 | 1 | 21 | 276 | 1166 | −890 | 6 | 1 | 4 |
If teams are level at any stage, tiebreakers are applied in the following order: 1. Number of matches won 2. Difference between points for and against 3. Total number of points for 4. Aggregate number of points scored in matches between tied teams 5. Number of matches won excluding the first match, then the second and so on until the tie is settled
Green background is the promotion place. Pink background are relegation places. Updated: 11 April 2026; Source:

== 2024–25 ==
The twelve teams are based in counties near the River Severn, i.e. Gloucestershire (five teams) and Somerset (three teams), with three from Wiltshire and one from Oxfordshire. Departing were Royal Wootton Bassett, promoted to Regional 1 South West. Chosen Hill Former Pupils (11th) and Devizes (12th) were relegated to Counties 1 Western North and Counties 1 Southern South respectively. Winscombe (8th) moved on a level transfer to Regional 2 South West.

=== Participating teams and locations ===
| Team | Ground | Capacity | City/Area | Previous season |
|---|---|---|---|---|
| Chippenham | Allington Fields | 500 | Chippenham, Wiltshire | 3rd |
| Drybrook | Mannings Ground | | Drybrook, Gloucestershire | 4th |
| Gordano | Caswell Lane | | Portbury, Somerset | 9th |
| Keynsham | Bristol Road | | Keynsham, Somerset | 7th |
| Longlevens | Longford Lane | | Longlevens, Gloucestershire | Promoted from Counties 1 Western North (2nd) |
| Old Centralians | Saintbridge Sports Centre | | Gloucester, Gloucestershire | 2nd |
| Stow-on-the-Wold | Oddington Road | | Stow-on-the-Wold, Gloucestershire | Level transfer from Regional 2 Midlands West |
| Swindon | Greenbridge Road | | Swindon, Wiltshire | 10th |
| Thornbury | Cooper's Farm | | Thornbury, Gloucestershire | 5th |
| Trowbridge | Doric Park | | Hilperton, Trowbridge, Wiltshire | 6th |
| Weston-super-Mare | Recreation Ground | 6,000 | Weston-super-Mare, Somerset | Relegated from Regional 1 South West |
| Witney | Hailey Road | | Witney, Oxfordshire | Level transfer from Regional 2 South Central (6th) |

Locations of the 2024–25 Regional 2 Severn teams in Avon & Gloucester
Locations of the 2024–25 Regional 2 Severn teams in Gloucestershire, Somerset, Wiltshire & Oxfordshire

=== League table ===
Regional 2 Severn 2024–25
| | Team | Played | Won | Drawn | Lost | Points for | Points against | Points diff | Try bonus | Loss bonus | Points |
| 1 | Drybrook (P) | 22 | 19 | 1 | 2 | 882 | 341 | 541 | 18 | 1 | 97 |
| 2 | Chippenham | 22 | 18 | 0 | 4 | 934 | 570 | 364 | 19 | 0 | 91 |
| 3 | Trowbridge | 22 | 17 | 0 | 5 | 869 | 472 | 397 | 16 | 4 | 88 |
| 4 | Keynsham | 22 | 13 | 0 | 9 | 728 | 546 | 182 | 16 | 6 | 74 |
| 5 | Longlevens | 22 | 13 | 2 | 7 | 854 | 552 | 302 | 16 | 0 | 72 |
| 6 | Stow-on-the-Wold | 22 | 13 | 1 | 8 | 567 | 530 | 37 | 12 | 3 | 69 |
| 7 | Weston-super-Mare | 22 | 10 | 0 | 12 | 596 | 616 | −20 | 12 | 4 | 57 |
| 8 | Old Centralians | 22 | 8 | 0 | 14 | 505 | 634 | −129 | 11 | 3 | 47 |
| 9 | Witney | 22 | 8 | 0 | 14 | 505 | 691 | −186 | 11 | 4 | 47 |
| 10 | Thornbury | 22 | 6 | 1 | 15 | 562 | 797 | −235 | 14 | 4 | 44 |
| 11 | Gordano (R) | 22 | 4 | 1 | 17 | 441 | 661 | −220 | 6 | 5 | 30 |
| 12 | Swindon (R) | 22 | 0 | 0 | 22 | 263 | 1296 | −1033 | 4 | 1 | 0 |
If teams are level at any stage, tiebreakers are applied in the following order: 1. Number of matches won 2. Difference between points for and against 3. Total number of points for 4. Aggregate number of points scored in matches between tied teams 5. Number of matches won excluding the first match, then the second and so on until the tie is settled
Green background is the promotion place. Pink background are relegation places. Updated: 26 October 2025; Source:

== 2023–24 ==
The twelve teams in this league are drawn from across Gloucestershire (five teams), Somerset (three) and Wiltshire (four). Nine of the teams played in last season's league. Matson, as champions, were promoted to Regional 1 South West, while Frome were relegated to Counties 1 Southern South. Newent moved on a level transfer to Regional 2 West Midlands. Joining were two teams relegated from Regional 1 South West, Old Centralians and Drybrook, while Devizes were added on a level transfer from Regional 2 South Central.

=== Participating teams and locations ===
| Team | Ground | Capacity | City/Area | Previous season |
|---|---|---|---|---|
| Chippenham | Allington Fields | 500 | Chippenham, Wiltshire | 2nd |
| Chosen Hill Former Pupils | Brookfield Road | | Churchdown, Gloucestershire | 6th |
| Devizes | The Sports Club | | Devizes, Wiltshire | Level transfer from Regional 2 South Central (8th) |
| Drybrook | Mannings Ground | | Drybrook, Gloucestershire | Relegated from Regional 1 South West (12th) |
| Gordano | Caswell Lane | | Portbury, Somerset | 9th |
| Keynsham | Bristol Road | | Keynsham, Somerset | 5th |
| Old Centralians | Saintbridge Sports Centre | | Gloucester, Gloucestershire | Relegated from Regional 1 South West (11th) |
| Royal Wootton Basset | Ballards Ash | 5,000 | Royal Wootton Bassett, Wiltshire | Relegated from Regional 1 South Central (11th) |
| Swindon | Greenbridge Road | | Swindon, Wiltshire | Transferred from Regional 2 South Central (10th) |
| Thornbury | Cooper's Farm | | Thornbury, Gloucestershire | 3rd |
| Trowbridge | Doric Park | | Hilperton, Trowbridge, Wiltshire | 7th |
| Winscombe | Recreation Ground | 1,200 | Winscombe, Somerset | 10th |

Locations of the 2023–24 Regional 2 Severn teams in Wiltshire
Locations of the 2023–24 Regional 2 Severn teams in Gloucestershire, Somerset & Avon

=== League table ===
Regional 2 Severn 2023–24
| | Team | Played | Won | Drawn | Lost | Points for | Points against | Points diff | Try bonus | Loss bonus | Points |
| 1 | Royal Wootton Bassett (P) | 22 | 21 | 0 | 1 | 1093 | 225 | +868 | 21 | 1 | 106 |
| 2 | Old Centralians | 22 | 17 | 1 | 4 | 653 | 458 | +195 | 15 | 0 | 85 |
| 3 | Chippenham | 22 | 16 | 0 | 6 | 793 | 489 | +304 | 19 | 2 | 85 |
| 4 | Drybrook | 22 | 13 | 0 | 9 | 630 | 475 | +155 | 14 | 3 | 69 |
| 5 | Thornbury | 22 | 12 | 1 | 9 | 578 | 629 | −51 | 13 | 3 | 66 |
| 6 | Trowbridge | 22 | 11 | 0 | 11 | 610 | 539 | +71 | 13 | 5 | 62 |
| 7 | Keynsham | 22 | 10 | 0 | 12 | 541 | 567 | −26 | 11 | 4 | 55 |
| 8 | Winscombe | 22 | 9 | 0 | 13 | 598 | 485 | +485 | 11 | 6 | 53 |
| 9 | Gordano | 22 | 8 | 0 | 14 | 438 | 709 | −271 | 9 | 2 | 43 |
| 10 | Swindon | 22 | 7 | 0 | 15 | 428 | 732 | −304 | 9 | 3 | 40 |
| 11 | Chosen Hill Former Pupils (R) | 22 | 6 | 1 | 15 | 362 | 698 | −336 | 4 | 4 | 34 |
| 12 | Devizes (R) | 22 | 0 | 1 | 21 | 291 | 1009 | −718 | 2 | 1 | 5 |
If teams are level at any stage, tiebreakers are applied in the following order: 1. Number of matches won 2. Difference between points for and against 3. Total number of points for 4. Aggregate number of points scored in matches between tied teams 5. Number of matches won excluding the first match, then the second and so on until the tie is settled
Green background is the promotion place. Pink background are relegation places. Updated: 20 January 2025; Source:

== 2022–23 ==
The twelve teams in this league are drawn from across Gloucestershire (five teams), Somerset (five) and Wiltshire (two). Matson, won all twenty of their matches and are promoted to Regional 1 South West. Frome are the only team to be relegated and will play in Counties 1 Southern South next season. The league originally had twelve teams, but Old Patesians decided to voluntary relegate themselves to Counties 3 Gloucestershire North, a level 9 league.

=== Participating teams and locations ===
| Team | Ground | Capacity | City/Area | Previous season |
|---|---|---|---|---|
| Cheltenham | Newlands Park | 1,000 | Southam, Cheltenham, Gloucestershire | Promoted from Western Counties North (2nd) |
| Chippenham | Allington Fields | | Chippenham, Wiltshire | Transferred from SW1E (8th) |
| Chosen Hill Former Pupils | Brookfield Road | | Churchdown, Gloucestershire | Promoted from Western Counties North (3rd) |
| Frome | Gypsy Lane | | Frome, Somerset | Transferred from SW1E (12th) |
| Gordano | Caswell Lane | | Portbury, Somerset | Promoted from Western Counties North (4th) |
| Keynsham | Bristol Road | | Keynsham, Somerset | Transferred from SW1W (6th) |
| Matson | Redwell Road | | Matson, Gloucester, Gloucestershire | Promoted from Western Counties North (champions) |
| Newent | Recreation Ground | | Newent, Gloucestershire | Transferred from SW1W (7th) |
| Old Patesians (Note: Old Patesians withdrew from Regional 2 Severn to compete in Counties 3 Gloucestershire North, a level 9 league.) | Everest Road | | Cheltenham, Gloucestershire | Transferred from SW1W (13th) |
| Thornbury | Cooper's Farm | | Thornbury, Gloucestershire | Transferred from SW1W (5th) |
| Trowbridge | Doric Park | 9550 | Hilperton, Trowbridge, Wiltshire | Transferred from SW1E (6th) |
| Winscombe | Recreation Ground | 1,200 | Winscombe, Somerset | Promoted from Western Counties North (5th) |

Locations of the 2022–23 Regional 2 Severn teams in Gloucester, Cheltenham & Avon
Locations of the 2022–23 Regional 2 Severn teams in Gloucestershire, Somerset & Wiltshire

=== League table ===
Regional 2 Severn 2022–23
| | Team | Played | Won | Drawn | Lost | Points for | Points against | Points diff | Try bonus | Loss bonus | Points |
| 1 | Matson (P) | 20 | 20 | 0 | 0 | 718 | 271 | +447 | 18 | 0 | 98 |
| 2 | Chippenham | 20 | 15 | 0 | 5 | 711 | 372 | +339 | 15 | 2 | 77 |
| 3 | Thornbury | 20 | 14 | 0 | 6 | 660 | 396 | +264 | 14 | 3 | 73 |
| 4 | Newent | 20 | 13 | 1 | 6 | 560 | 474 | +86 | 11 | 1 | 66 |
| 5 | Keynsham | 20 | 11 | 0 | 9 | 472 | 494 | –22 | 10 | 4 | 58 |
| 6 | Chosen Hill Former Pupils | 20 | 9 | 1 | 10 | 430 | 502 | −72 | 8 | 4 | 50 |
| 7 | Trowbridge | 20 | 8 | 0 | 12 | 502 | 556 | −54 | 8 | 1 | 41 |
| 8 | Cheltenham | 20 | 4 | 1 | 15 | 421 | 707 | −286 | 13 | 5 | 36 |
| 9 | Gordano | 20 | 5 | 0 | 15 | 406 | 703 | −297 | 10 | 4 | 34 |
| 10 | Winscombe | 20 | 5 | 1 | 14 | 354 | 521 | −167 | 5 | 3 | 30 |
| 11 | Frome (R) | 20 | 4 | 0 | 16 | 379 | 617 | −238 | 4 | 5 | 25 |
If teams are level at any stage, tiebreakers are applied in the following order: 1. Number of matches won 2. Difference between points for and against 3. Total number of points for 4. Aggregate number of points scored in matches between tied teams 5. Number of matches won excluding the first match, then the second and so on until the tie is settled
Green background is the promotion place. Pink background are relegation places. Updated: 19 June 2023; Source:

== Regional 2 Severn honours ==
The RFU reorganised the league structure in 2022 and this league is one of twelve at level six.

Regional 2 Severn
| Season | No of teams | No of matches | Champions | Runners-up | Relegated teams | Ref |
| 2022–23 | 11 | 20 | Matson | Chippenham | Frome | |
| 2023–24 | 12 | 22 | Royal Wootton Bassett | Old Centralians | Chosen Hill Former Pupils (11th) and Devizes (12th) | |
| 2024–25 | 12 | 22 | Drybrook | Chippenham | Gordano (11th) and Swindon (12th) | |
| 2025–26 | 12 | 22 | Trowbridge | | | |
Green background is the promotion place.
