= Counties 1 Western North =

English rugby union league

- Current season or competition: 2025–26 Counties 1 Western North
- Sport: Rugby union
- Instituted: 1987; 39 years ago
- Number of teams: 12
- Country: England
- Holders: Cleve (2nd title) (2024–25 promoted to Regional 2 Severn)
- Most titles: Coney Hill (4 titles)
- Website: Western Counties North

Counties 1 Western North (known as Counties 1 Tribute Western North for sponsorship purposes) is an English rugby union league. Originally a single division called Western Counties, in 1996 the division split into two regional leagues called Western Counties North and Western Counties West. Western Counties North was renamed Counties 1 Western North prior to the 2022–23 season and is currently a seventh tier league for clubs based in the south-west of England; mainly Bristol, Gloucestershire and Somerset. The current champions are Cleve.

== Format ==
The champions are promoted to Regional 2 Severn. The number of teams relegated depends on feedback following promotion and relegation in the leagues above, but is usually two or three to Counties 2 Gloucestershire North / South and Counties 2 Somerset.

The season runs from September to March and comprises twenty-two rounds of matches, with each club playing each of its rivals, home and away. The results of the matches contribute points to the league as follows:

- 4 points are awarded for a win
- 2 points are awarded for a draw
- 0 points are awarded for a loss, however
- 1 losing (bonus) point is awarded to a team that loses a match by 7 points or fewer
- 1 additional (bonus) point is awarded to a team scoring 4 tries or more in a match.

== 2026–27 ==
Departing were champions Nailsea & Backwell promoted to Regional 2 South West while Bridgwater & Albion (10th) and Taunton II (11th) were relegated to Counties 2 Somerset as were Chosen Hill Former Pupils (12th) to Counties 2 Gloucestershire.

Team	Ground	Capacity	Town/Area	Previous season
Burnham-on-Sea	BASC Ground		Burnham-on-Sea, Somerset	Promoted from Counties 2 Somerset (champions)
Chard	The Park, Essex Close		Chard, Somerset	6th
Cheltenham	Newlands Park	1,000	Southam, Cheltenham, Gloucestershire	Relegated from Regional 2 Severn
Cinderford II	Dockham Road	2,500	Cinderford, Gloucestershire	Promoted from Counties 2 Gloucestershire (champions)
Clifton II	Station Road	2,500 (400 seats)	Cribbs Causeway, Patchway, Bristol	4th
Dings Crusaders II	Shaftsbury Park	2,250 (250 seats)	Frenchay, Bristol	2nd
Gordano	Caswell Lane		Portbury, Somerset	8th
Gordon League	Hempsted Lane		Gloucester, Gloucestershire	9th
Midsomer Norton	Norton Down Playing Fields		Midsomer Norton, Somerset	3rd
Old Bristolians	Memorial Playing Fields		Failand, Somerset	5th
Old Redcliffians II	Scotland Lane	1,000	Brislington, Bristol	7th
Wellington	Athletic Ground		Wellington, Somerset	Relegated from Regional 2 South West

Locations of the 2026–27 Counties 1 Western North teams in Gloucestershire & Bristol
Locations of the 2026–27 Counties 1 Western North teams in Somerset

== 2025–26 ==
=== Participating teams and location ===
Departing were Cleve promoted to Regional 2 Severn while Cinderford 2XV and Burnham-on-Sea were relegated.

Team	Ground	Capacity	Town/Area	Previous season
Bridgwater & Albion	Bath Road	5,000	Bridgwater, Somerset	6th
Chard	The Park, Essex Close		Chard, Somerset	8th
Chosen Hill Former Pupils	Brookfield Road		Churchdown, Gloucestershire	10th
Clifton II	Station Road	2,500 (400 seats)	Cribbs Causeway, Patchway, Bristol	2nd
Dings Crusaders II	Shaftsbury Park	2,250 (250 seats)	Frenchay, Bristol	Promoted from Counties 2 Gloucestershire South (champions)
Gordano	Caswell Lane		Portbury, Somerset	Relegated from Regional 2 Severn (11th)
Gordon League	Hempsted Lane		Gloucester, Gloucestershire	9th
Midsomer Norton	Norton Down Playing Fields		Midsomer Norton, Somerset	Promoted from Counties 2 Somerset (champions)
Nailsea & Backwell	West End Park		Nailsea, Somerset	5th
Old Bristolians	Memorial Playing Fields		Failand, Somerset	3rd
Old Redcliffians II	Scotland Lane	1,000	Brislington, Bristol	4th
Taunton II	Towergate Stadium	2,000 (198 seats)	Taunton, Somerset	7th

Locations of the 2025–26 Counties 1 Western North teams in Gloucestershire & Bristol
Locations of the 2025–26 Counties 1 Western North teams in Somerset

== 2024–25 ==
=== Participating teams and location ===
Departing were Longlevens, in second place were promoted to Regional 2 Severn instead of the champions Cinderford 2XV as league regulations to not allow second teams to be promoted to a level six league. Chipping Sodbury were relegated to Counties 2 Gloucestershire South and Clevedon and Midsomer Norton were relegated to Counties 2 Somerset. With four teams leaving and five joining the league was restored to twelve sides.

Team	Ground	Capacity	Town/Area	Previous season
Bridgwater & Albion	Bath Road	5,000	Bridgwater, Somerset	5th
Burnham-on-Sea	BASC Ground		Burnham-on-Sea, Somerset	Relegated from Regional 2 South West (12th)
Chard	The Park, Essex Close		Chard, Somerset	Relegated from Regional 2 South West (11th)
Chosen Hill Former Pupils	Brookfield Road		Churchdown, Gloucestershire	Relegated from Regional 2 Severn (11th)
Cinderford II	Dockham Road	2,500	Cinderford, Gloucestershire	1st (not promoted)
Cleve	The Hayfields		Mangotsfield, Gloucestershire	8th
Clifton II	Station Road	2,500 (400 seats)	Cribbs Causeway, Patchway, Bristol	6th
Gordon League	Hempsted Lane		Gloucester, Gloucestershire	Promoted from Counties 2 Gloucestershire North (champions)
Nailsea & Backwell	West End Park		Nailsea, Somerset	3rd
Old Bristolians	Memorial Playing Fields		Failand, Somerset	7th
Old Redcliffians II	Scotland Lane	1,000	Brislington, Bristol	4th
Taunton II	Towergate Stadium	2,000 (198 seats)	Taunton, Somerset	Promoted from Counties 2 Somerset (champions)

Locations of the 2024–25 Counties 1 Western North teams in Gloucestershire
Locations of the 2024–25 Counties 1 Western North teams in Avon & Somerset

=== League table ===
2024–25 Counties 1 Western North League Table
		Played	Won	Drawn	Lost	Points for	Points against	Points diff	Try bonus	Loss bonus	Points	Pts adj
1	Cleve (P)	22	20	0	2	821	318	503	15	1	98	2
2	Clifton II	22	19	0	3	707	424	283	18	2	97	1
3	Old Bristolians	22	15	0	7	737	556	181	18	2	80	
4	Old Redcliffians II	22	14	0	8	608	484	124	12	3	73	2
5	Nailsea & Backwell	21	13	0	8	662	517	145	15	6	73	
6	Bridgewater & Albion	21	9	0	12	553	717	−164	12	3	51	
7	Taunton II	22	11	0	11	643	645	−2	13	2	49	−10
8	Chard	21	7	0	14	518	612	−94	9	6	43	
9	Gordon League	21	6	1	14	387	680	−293	5	3	34	
10	Chosen Hill Former Pupils	22	5	0	17	441	697	−256	9	5	34	
11	Cinderford II (R)	22	6	1	15	409	598	−189	10	3	29	−10
12	Burnham-on-Sea (R)	22	4	0	18	554	792	−238	8	4	28	
If teams are level at any stage, tiebreakers are applied in the following order: 1. Number of matches won 2. Difference between points for and against 3. Total number of points for 4. Aggregate number of points scored in matches between tied teams 5. Number of matches won excluding the first match, then the second and so on until the tie is settled
Green background is the promotion place Pink background are the relegation places Updated: 1 November 2025

== 2023–24 ==
=== Participating teams and location ===
Departing were 2nd placed Burnham-on-Sea, promoted to Regional 1 South West. Although Cinderford 2XV finished top, owing to league regulations Cinderford were unable to be promoted. Avonmouth Old Boys and Cheltenham North were relegated. Barton Hill, 7th in 2022–23, did not return for the new season and with four teams departing and three joining, the league ran with eleven sides last season.

Team	Ground	Capacity	Town/Area	Previous season
Bridgwater & Albion	Bath Road	5,000	Bridgwater, Somerset	Relegated from Regional 2 South West (12th)
Chipping Sodbury	The Ridings		Chipping Sodbury, Gloucestershire	9th
Cinderford II	Dockham Road	2,500	Cinderford, Gloucestershire	1st (not promoted)
Cleve	The Hayfields		Mangotsfield, Gloucestershire	8th
Clevedon	Coleridge Vale Playing Fields		Clevedon, Somerset	6th
Clifton II	Station Road	2,500 (400 seats)	Cribbs Causeway, Patchway, Bristol	Promoted from Counties 2 Gloucestershire South (champions)
Longlevens	Longford Lane		Longlevens, Gloucestershire	3rd
Midsomer Norton	Norton Down Playing Fields		Midsomer Norton, Somerset	5th
Nailsea & Backwell	West End Park		Nailsea, Somerset	4th
Old Bristolians	Memorial Playing Fields		Failand, Somerset	10th
Old Redcliffians II	Scotland Lane	1,000	Brislington, Bristol	Promoted from Counties 2 Somerset (champions)

Locations of the 2023–24 Counties 1 Western North teams in Gloucestershire
Locations of the 2023–24 Counties 1 Western North teams in Avon & Somerset

=== League table ===
2023–24 Counties 1 Western North League Table
		Played	Won	Drawn	Lost	Points for	Points against	Points diff	Try bonus	Loss bonus	Points
1	Cinderford II	20	17	1	2	753	221	532	13	0	88
2	Longlevens (P)	20	17	0	3	883	363	520	17	0	85
3	Nailsea & Backwell	20	14	1	5	656	349	307	16	2	76
4	Old Redcliffians II	20	14	0	6	734	491	243	13	2	71
5	Bridgewater & Albion	20	10	0	10	548	548	0	11	3	54
6	Clifton II	20	7	2	11	467	491	−24	10	5	50
7	Old Bristolians	20	8	0	12	426	663	−237	9	2	43
8	Cleve	20	7	0	13	460	595	−135	9	3	40
9	Midsomer Norton (R)	20	7	0	13	546	560	−14	7	4	39
10	Clevedon (R)	20	6	2	12	380	537	−157	4	2	38
11	Chipping Sodbury (R)	20	0	0	20	194	1229	−1035	0	0	0
If teams are level at any stage, tiebreakers are applied in the following order: 1. Number of matches won 2. Difference between points for and against 3. Total number of points for 4. Aggregate number of points scored in matches between tied teams 5. Number of matches won excluding the first match, then the second and so on until the tie is settled
Green background is the promotion place Pink background are the relegation places Updated: 1 November 2025

== 2022–23 ==
=== Participating teams and location ===
Team	Ground	Capacity	Town/Area	Previous season
Avonmouth Old Boys	Barracks Lane		Shirehampton, Bristol	12th
Barton Hill	Duncombe Road		Speedwell, Bristol	10th
Burnham-on-Sea	BASC Ground		Burnham-on-Sea, Somerset	6th Western Counties West
Cheltenham North	Stoke Orchard Road		Bishop's Cleeve, Gloucestershire	13th
Chipping Sodbury	The Ridings		Chipping Sodbury, Gloucestershire	8th
Cinderford II	Dockham Road	2,500	Cinderford, Gloucestershire	New entry
Cleve	The Hayfields		Mangotsfield, Gloucestershire	9th
Clevedon	Coleridge Vale Playing Fields		Clevedon, Somerset	11th
Longlevens	Longford Lane		Longlevens, Gloucestershire	1st Gloucester Premier
Midsomer Norton	Norton Down Playing Fields		Midsomer Norton, Somerset	7th
Nailsea & Backwell	West End Park		Nailsea, Somerset	1st Somerset Premier
Old Bristolians	Memorial Playing Fields		Failand, Somerset	6th

Locations of the 2022–23 Counties 1 Western North teams in Gloucestershire
Locations of the 2022–23 Counties 1 Western North teams in Avon & Somerset

=== League table ===
2022–23 Counties 1 Western North League Table
		Played	Won	Drawn	Lost	Points for	Points against	Points diff	Try bonus	Loss bonus	Points
1	Cinderford II	21	20	0	1	1024	301	723	17	1	98
2	Burnham-on-Sea (P)	22	17	0	5	814	473	341	15	2	85
3	Longlevens	22	17	0	5	905	410	495	15	1	84
4	Nailsea & Backwell	22	16	1	5	685	446	239	15	2	83
5	Midsomer Norton	22	12	1	9	666	590	76	11	5	66
6	Clevedon	22	13	0	9	473	555	−82	9	2	63
7	Barton Hill	22	11	0	11	452	642	−190	9	1	54
8	Cleve	21	7	0	14	501	501	0	8	7	43
9	Chipping Sodbury	22	8	0	14	440	779	−339	7	1	40
10	Old Bristolians	22	4	0	18	441	525	−84	8	10	20
11	Cheltenham North (R)	22	3	0	19	448	973	−525	8	0	20
12	Avonmouth Old Boys (R)	22	2	0	20	319	973	−654	2	5	15
If teams are level at any stage, tiebreakers are applied in the following order: 1. Number of matches won 2. Difference between points for and against 3. Total number of points for 4. Aggregate number of points scored in matches between tied teams 5. Number of matches won excluding the first match, then the second and so on until the tie is settled
Green background is the promotion place Pink background are the relegation places Updated: 1 August 2023

== 2021–22 ==
Spartans, 11th in 2019–20, withdrew during the season leaving the league to complete with thirteen clubs.

=== Participating teams ===
Team	Ground	Capacity	Town/Area	Previous season
Avonmouth Old Boys	Barracks Lane		Shirehampton, Bristol	5th
Barton Hill	Duncombe Road		Speedwell, Bristol	7th
Cheltenham	Newlands Park	1,000	Southam, Cheltenham, Gloucestershire	3rd
Cheltenham North	Stoke Orchard Road		Bishop's Cleeve, Gloucestershire	Promoted from Gloucester Premier (2nd)
Chipping Sodbury	The Ridings		Chipping Sodbury, Gloucestershire	6th
Chosen Hill Former Pupils	Brookfield Road		Churchdown, Gloucestershire	Promoted from Gloucester Premier (champions)
Cleve	The Hayfields		Mangotsfield, Gloucestershire	Relegated from South West 1 West (14th)
Clevedon	Coleridge Vale Playing Fields		Clevedon, Somerset	12th
Gordano	Caswell Lane		Portbury, Somerset	8th
Matson	Redwell Road		Matson, Gloucester, Gloucestershire	2nd
Midsomer Norton	Norton Down Playing Fields		Midsomer Norton, Somerset	4th
Old Bristolians	Memorial Playing Fields		Failand, Somerset	10th
Winscombe	Recreation Ground	1,200	Winscombe, Somerset	9th

Locations of the 2021–22 Tribute Western Counties North teams in Bristol & Gloucestershire
Locations of the 2021–22 Tribute Western Counties North teams in Avon & Somerset

=== League table ===
2021–22 Tribute Western Counties North League Table
		Played	Won	Drawn	Lost	Points for	Points against	Points diff	Try bonus	Loss bonus	Points	Pts adj
1	Matson	24	24	0	0	1019	192	827	22	0	119	
2	Cheltenham	24	20	1	3	932	456	476	16	1	100	
3	Chosen Hill Former Pupils	24	17	0	7	762	455	307	15	1	84	
4	Gordano	24	15	1	8	653	544	109	13	2	77	
5	Winscombe	24	14	2	8	631	526	105	14	1	75	
6	Old Bristolians	24	13	1	10	690	518	172	14	4	72	
7	Midsomer Norton	24	12	0	12	690	665	25	14	4	67	
8	Chipping Sodbury	24	12	0	14	784	734	50	13	5	61	
9	Cleve	24	9	1	14	485	561	−76	7	6	51	
10	Barton Hill	24	8	0	16	462	680	−218	9	4	45	
11	Clevedon	24	7	0	17	492	780	−288	6	3	37	
12	Avonmouth Old Boys	24	2	0	22	373	826	−453	2	8	18	
13	Cheltenham North	24	2	0	22	356	1126	−770	10	4	12	−10
If teams are level at any stage, tiebreakers are applied in the following order: 1. Number of matches won 2. Difference between points for and against 3. Total number of points for 4. Aggregate number of points scored in matches between tied teams 5. Number of matches won excluding the first match, then the second and so on until the tie is settled
Green background are the promotion places to 2 Severn and 2 South West Pink background there was no relegation. Updated: 25 June 2022

== 2020–21 ==
Due to the ongoing coronavirus pandemic the season was cancelled.

== 2019–20 ==
=== Participating teams ===
Team	Ground	Capacity	Town/Area	Previous season
Avonmouth Old Boys	Barracks Lane		Shirehampton, Bristol	5th
Barton Hill	Duncombe Road		Speedwell, Bristol	10th
Bristol Saracens	Bakewell Memorial Ground		Cribbs Causeway, Bristol	Promoted from Gloucester Premier (playoff)
Cheltenham	Newlands Park		Southam, Cheltenham, Gloucestershire	11th
Chipping Sodbury	Wickwar Road		Chipping Sodbury, Gloucestershire	6th
Clevedon	Coleridge Vale Playing Fields		Clevedon, Somerset	8th
Coney Hill	Metz Hill		Gloucester, Gloucestershire	Relegated from South West 1 West (14th)
Gordano	Caswell Lane		Portbury, Somerset	7th
Matson	Redwell Road		Matson, Gloucester, Gloucestershire	3rd
Midsomer Norton	Norton Down Playing Fields		Midsomer Norton, Somerset	Runners up (lost playoff)
Old Bristolians	Memorial Playing Fields		Failand, Somerset	9th
Spartans	Lansdown Road		Gloucester, Gloucestershire	Promoted from Gloucester Premier (champions)
Stroud	Fromehall Park	4,000 (200 seats)	Stroud, Gloucestershire	4th
Winscombe	Recreation Ground	1,200	Winscombe, Somerset	Level transfer from Western Counties West (9th)

Locations of the 2019–20 Tribute Western Counties North teams in Gloucestershire
Locations of the 2019–20 Tribute Western Counties North teams in Somerset

== 2018–19 ==
=== Participating teams ===
Team	Ground	Capacity	Town/Area	Previous season
Avonmouth Old Boys	Barracks Lane		Shirehampton, Bristol	3rd
Barton Hill	Duncombe Road		Speedwell, Bristol	Promoted from Gloucester Premier (play-off)
Cheltenham	Newlands Park		Southam, Cheltenham, Gloucestershire	10th
Chew Valley	Chew Lane		Chew Magna, Somerset	Runner-up (lost play-off)
Chipping Sodbury	Wickwar Road		Chipping Sodbury, Gloucestershire	Promoted from Gloucester Premier (champions)
Chosen Hill Former Pupils	Brookfield Road		Churchdown, Gloucestershire	7th
Clevedon	Coleridge Vale Playing Fields		Clevedon, Somerset	Relegated from South West 1 West (14th)
Gordano	Caswell Lane		Portbury, Somerset	Promoted from Somerset Premier (champions)
Matson	Redwell Road		Matson, Gloucester, Gloucestershire	Relegated from South West 1 West (12th)
Midsomer Norton	Norton Down Playing Fields		Midsomer Norton, Somerset	6th
Old Bristolians	Memorial Playing Fields		Failand, Somerset	5th
Old Richians	Sandyleaze		Gloucester, Gloucestershire	4th
Stroud	Fromehall Park	4,000 (200 seats)	Stroud, Gloucestershire	8th
Wells	Charter Way		Wells, Somerset	9th

Locations of the 2018–19 Tribute Western Counties North teams in Gloucestershire
Locations of the 2018–19 Tribute Western Counties North teams in Somerset

=== Promotion play-off ===
In the play-off for promotion, Midsomer Norton played Crediton from Western Counties West for promotion to South West 1 West. Midsomer Norton had the best playing record and hosted the match, losing 15 – 19. This was the first time either team had participated in the play-offs, at this level, and Crediton's win was the sixth time the away team had won match. Teams from Western Counties North lead 10–9 in the nineteen play-off matches played since 2001.

	Played	Won	Drawn	Lost	Points for	Points against	Points diff	Try bonus	Loss bonus	Points
Midsomer Norton	26	20	0	6	750	595	155	20	2	102
Crediton (P)	26	21	2	3	643	423	220	12	1	101

27 April 2019
15:00

Midsomer Norton	15–19	Crediton

Norton Down Playing Fields, Midsomer Norton, Somerset

== 2017–18 ==
The season started on 2 September and the final league matches were due to be completed by 21 April 2018, with the promotion play-off the following week.

=== Participating teams ===
Team	Ground	Capacity	Town/Area	Previous season
Avonmouth Old Boys	Barracks Lane		Shirehampton, Bristol	4th
Bristol Saracens	Bakewell Memorial Ground		Cribbs Causeway, Bristol	7th
Cheltenham	Newlands Park Sports & Social Venue		Southam, Cheltenham, Gloucestershire	10th
Chew Valley	Chew Lane		Chew Magna, Somerset	2nd
Chosen Hill Former Pupils	Brookfield Road		Churchdown, Gloucestershire	3rd
Coney Hill	Metz Hill		Gloucester, Gloucestershire	11th
Midsomer Norton	Norton Down Playing Fields		Midsomer Norton, Somerset	Relegated from Tribute South West 1 West (14th)
Old Bristolians	Memorial Playing Fields		Failand, Somerset	6th
Oldfield Old Boys	Shaft Road		Monkton Combe, Bath, Somerset	Promoted from Tribute Somerset Premier (play-off)
Old Richians	Sandyleaze		Gloucester, Gloucestershire	Promoted from Gloucester Premier (champions)
Stroud	Fromehall Park	4,000 (200 seats)	Stroud, Gloucestershire	5th
Wells	Charter Way		Wells, Somerset	9th
Winscombe	Recreation Ground	1,200	Winscombe, Somerset	Promoted from Tribute Somerset Premier (champions)
Yatton	The Park		Yatton, Somerset	8th

Locations of the 2017–18 Tribute Western Counties North teams in Somerset
Locations of the 2017–18 Tribute Western Counties North teams in Gloucestershire

=== Promotion play-off ===
Each season, the runners-up in Western Counties West and Western Counties North, participate in a play-off for promotion to South West 1 West. The team with the best playing record, in this case Chew Valley, host the match, and for the second successive season they lost, this time to Devonport Services 12 – 22. It is the first time Devonport Services are promoted to a level six league. This match was the eighteenth play-off for promotion; the northern sides lead with ten victories to the west's eight and the home teams are leading thirteen to five.

	Played	Won	Drawn	Lost	Points for	Points against	Points diff	Try bonus	Loss bonus	Points
Chew Valley	26	18	0	8	798	458	340	15	5	92
Devonport Services (P)	26	17	1	8	719	456	263	14	6	90

April 2018
15:00

Chew Valley	12–22	Devonport Services

Chew Lane, Chew Magna

== 2016–17 ==
=== Participating teams ===
Team	Ground	Capacity	Town/Area	Previous season
Avon	Ashley Lane		Bradford-on-Avon, Wiltshire	11th
Avonmouth Old Boys	Barracks Lane		Shirehampton, Bristol	relegated from Tribute South West 1 West (13th)
Bristol Saracens	Bakewell Memorial Ground		Cribbs Causeway, Bristol	promoted from Gloucester Premier (champions)
Cheltenham	Newlands Park Sports & Social Venue		Southam, Cheltenham	8th
Chew Valley	Chew Lane		Chew Magna, Somerset	3rd
Chosen Hill Former Pupils	Brookfield Road		Churchdown, Gloucestershire	9th
Cirencester	The Whiteway		Cirencester, Wiltshire	promoted from Gloucester Premier (via play-off)
Coney Hill	Metz Hill		Gloucester	relegated from Tribute South West 1 West (14th)
Keynsham	Bristol Road		Keynsham, Somerset	
Old Bristolians	Memorial Playing Fields		Failand, Somerset	4th
Stroud	Fromehall Park	4,000 (200 seats)	Stroud, Gloucestershire	5th
Wells	Charter Way		Wells, Somerset	relegated from Tribute South West 1 West (12th)
Whitehall	Foundry Lane		Whitehall, Bristol	7th
Yatton	The Park		Yatton, Somerset	promoted from Tribute Somerset Premier (champions)

=== League table ===
2016–17 Tribute Western Counties North League Table
		Played	Won	Drawn	Lost	Points for	Points against	Points diff	Try bonus	Loss bonus	Points
1	Keynsham (P)	26	23	0	3	718	316	402	15	1	109
2	Chew Valley	26	22	0	4	822	493	329	18	0	106
3	Chosen Hill Former Pupils	26	19	0	7	728	423	305	15	5	96
4	Avonmouth Old Boys	26	18	0	8	718	472	246	12	4	88
5	Stroud	26	15	0	11	846	534	312	15	4	79
6	Old Bristolians	26	15	0	11	621	499	122	11	6	77
7	Bristol Saracens	26	13	0	13	596	592	4	10	5	67
8	Yatton	26	12	0	14	784	734	50	13	5	61
9	Wells	26	11	0	15	442	687	−245	10	3	57
10	Cheltenham	26	10	0	16	588	806	−218	11	4	55
11	Coney Hill	26	12	0	14	547	558	−11	8	7	53
12	Cirencester	26	6	0	20	356	817	−461	4	5	33
13	Whitehall	26	3	0	23	433	923	−490	7	6	25
14	Avon	26	3	0	23	439	784	−345	3	7	22
If teams are level at any stage, tiebreakers are applied in the following order: 1. Number of matches won 2. Difference between points for and against 3. Total number of points for 4. Aggregate number of points scored in matches between tied teams 5. Number of matches won excluding the first match, then the second and so on until the tie is settled
Green background is the promotion place. Blue background is the play-off place. Pink background are relegation places. Updated: 24 May 2017

=== Promotion play-off ===
Each season, the runners-up in Western Counties North and Western Counties West, participate in a play-off for promotion to South West 1 West. The team with the best playing record, in this case Chew Valley, host the match and they lost to their opponents Cullompton 12 – 29.

	Played	Won	Drawn	Lost	Points for	Points against	Points diff	Try bonus	Loss bonus	Points
Chew Valley	26	22	0	4	822	493	329	18	0	106
Cullompton (P)	26	22	0	4	659	311	348	11	2	101

29 April 2017
15:00

Chew Valley	12–29	Cullompton

Chew Lane

== 2015–16 ==
The 2015–16 Tribute Western Counties North consists of fourteen teams; six from Somerset, four from Gloucestershire, three from Bristol and one from Wiltshire. The season started on 5 September 2015 and is finishes on 30 April 2016.

=== Participating teams and location ===
Nine of the fourteen teams participated in last season's competition. The 2014–15 champions Coney Hill and runners up Newent (who won their playoff game) were promoted to Tribute South West 1 West while Bristol Saracens and North Bristol were relegated to the Gloucester Premier and Stothert & Pitt to the Tribute Somerset Premier.

Locations of the 2015–16 Tribute Western Counties North teams
2015–16 Bristol & surrounding area Tribute Western Counties North teams

Team	Ground	Capacity	Town/Village	Previous season
Avon	Ashley Lane		Bradford-on-Avon, Wiltshire	5th
Barton Hill	Duncombe Road		Speedwell, Bristol	10th
Bristol Harlequins	Broomhill Road		Brislington, Bristol	3rd
Burnham-on-Sea	BASC Ground		Burnham-on-Sea, Somerset	11th
Cheltenham	Newlands Park Sports & Social Venue		Southam, Cheltenham, Gloucestershire	9th
Chew Valley	Chew Lane		Chew Magna, Somerset	4th
Chosen Hill Former Pupils	Brookfield Road		Churchdown, Gloucester, Gloucestershire	6th
Gordano	Caswell Lane		Portbury, Somerset	promoted from Tribute Somerset Premier (champions)
Keynsham	Bristol Road		Keynsham, Somerset	8th
Matson	Redwell Road		Gloucester, Gloucestershire	relegated from Tribute South West 1 West (12th)
Old Bristolians	Memorial Playing Fields		Failand, Somerset	7th
Stroud	Fromehall Park	4,000 (200 seats)	Stroud, Gloucestershire	promoted from Gloucester Premier (champions)
Wellington	Athletic Ground		Wellington, Somerset	level transfer from Tribute Western Counties West
Whitehall	Foundry Lane		Whitehall, Bristol	promoted from Gloucester Premier (play-off)

== Participating teams 2014–15 ==
- Avon
- Barton Hill
- Bristol Harlequins
- Bristol Saracens (promoted from Gloucester Premier)
- Burnham-on-Sea
- Cheltenham
- Chew Valley
- Chosen Hill Former Pupils
- Coney Hill (relegated from Tribute South West 1 West)
- Keynsham
- Old Bristolians
- Newent (promoted from Gloucester Premier)
- North Bristol
- Stothert & Pitt

== Participating teams 2013–14 ==
- Avon
- Barton Hill
- Berry Hill
- Bristol Harlequins
- Chew Valley (promoted from Tribute Somerset Premier)
- Chosen Hill Former Pupils
- Cirencester
- Drybrook (promoted from Gloucester Premier)
- Keynsham (promoted from Tribute Somerset Premier)
- Matson
- Midsomer Norton
- North Bristol
- Old Bristolians
- Oldfield Old Boys (relegated from Tribute South West 1 West)

== Participating teams 2012–13 ==
- Avon
- Barton Hill
- Berry Hill
- Bristol Harlequins
- Burnham-on-Sea
- Chosen Hill Former Pupils
- Cirencester
- Hornets
- Matson
- North Bristol
- Old Bristolians
- Wells
- Yatton

== Participating teams 2011–12 ==
- Barton Hill
- Bristol Harlequins
- Burnham-on-Sea
- Chard
- Cirencester
- Gordon League
- Hornets
- Keynsham
- Matson
- North Bristol
- Old Centralians
- Stroud
- Whitehall
- Yatton

== Participating teams 2010–11 ==
- Barton Hill
- Berry Hill
- Bristol Harlequins
- Cirencester
- Drybrook
- Gordon League
- Keynsham
- Matson
- North Bristol
- Old Centralians
- Stroud
- St Mary's Old Boys (SW)
- Thornbury
- Yatton

== Participating teams 2009–10 ==
- Barton Hill
- Berry Hill
- Burnham on Sea
- Drybrook
- Gordon League
- Hornets
- Keynsham
- North Bristol
- Old Centralians
- Old Redcliffians
- Southmead
- Stroud
- Thornbury
- Widden Old Boys

== Original teams ==
When league rugby began in 1987 this division (known as Western Counties) contained the following teams:

- Avon & Somerset Police
- Cirencester
- Clevedon
- Gordon League
- Matson
- Newquay Hornets
- Okehampton
- Old Redcliffians
- Sidmouth
- Tiverton
- Truro

== Western Counties North honours ==
=== Western Counties (1987–1993) ===
Originally Western Counties North and Western Counties West was a single division called Western Counties (sponsored by Courage), involving teams based in the south-west of England including Bristol, Cornwall, Devon, Gloucester and Somerset. Each team played one match against each of the other teams with the winning team awarded two points; there was one point for each team in a drawn match. It was a tier 7 league with promotion up to South West 2 (Note: South West 2 is currently two regional divisions - South West 1 East and South West 1 West.) and relegation to either Cornwall/Devon or Gloucestershire/Somerset. (Note: Gloucestershire/Somerset is currently two separate leagues – Gloucester Premier and Somerset Premier.)

Western Counties
Season	No of teams	No of matches	Champions	Runners-up	Relegated team(s)	Ref
1987–88	11	10	Matson	Gordon League	Avon & Somerset Police, Sidmouth	
1988–89	11	10	Gordon League	Avonmouth Old Boys	Devonport Services, Crediton	
1989–90	11	10	Penryn	Avonmouth Old Boys	Cirencester, Devon & Cornwall Police	
1990–91	11	10	Coombe Down	Avonmouth Old Boys	Truro	
1991–92	11	10	Clevedon	Bridgwater & Albion (Note: Old Culverhaysians also promoted.)	Newquay Hornets	
1992–93	13	12	Gloucester Old Boys	Launceston	Plymouth Civil Service, Devon & Cornwall Police	

=== Western Counties (1993–1996) ===
At the end of the 1992–93 season the top six teams from London Division 1 and the top six from South West Division 1 were combined to create National 5 South. This meant that Western Counties dropped from a tier 7 league to a tier 8 league for the years that National 5 South was active. Promotion continued to South West 2 and relegation down to either Cornwall/Devon or Gloucestershire/Somerset. (Note: Currently split into Gloucester Premier and Somerset Premier.) The league continued to be sponsored by Courage.

Western Counties
Season	No of teams	No of matches	Champions	Runners-up	Relegated team(s)	Ref
1993–94	13	12	Old Patesians	Tiverton	Wiveliscombe	
1994–95	13	12	Launceston	Devonport Services	Avonmouth Old Boys	
1995–96	13	12	Dings Crusaders	Spartans (Note: League restructuring meant that five teams were promoted, including 3rd to 5th place Penzance & Newlyn, Devonport Services and Tiverton.)	No relegation (Note: There was no relegation as Western Counties was due to split into Western Counties North and Western Counties West.)	
Green background are the promotion places.

=== Western Counties North (1996–2000) ===
Major restructuring by the RFU at the end of the 1995–96 season saw Western Counties split into two separate leagues, Western Counties North and Western Counties West, which reverted to tier 7 leagues due to the cancellation of National 5 South. Promotion from Western Counties North was to the new South West 2 West division (formerly South West 2) (Note: From the 1996–97 season South West 2 was split into two regional divisions – South West 2 East and South West 2 West.) while relegation was to Gloucestershire/Somerset. (Note: Currently Gloucester Premier and Somerset Premier.) (Note: Relegated Western Counties West clubs dropped to Cornwall/Devon.)

Western Counties North
Season	No of teams	No of matches	Champions	Runners-up	Relegated team(s)	Ref
1996–97	16	15	Keynsham	St Mary's Old Boys	Chard	
1997–98	17	16	St Mary's Old Boys	Cleve	Old Culverhays	
1998–99	17	16	Hornets	Coney Hill	Avonmouth Old Boys	
1999–00	17	16	Coney Hill	Cheltenham North	Multiple teams (Note: Oldfield Old Boys, Drybrook, Bristol Harlequins, St Bernadettes Old Boys, Wiveliscombe and Thornbury were the relegated sides this season. The reason for so many relegations was because the league would be reduced from 17 to 12 teams for the 2000–01 season.)	
Green background are the promotion places.

=== Western Counties North (2000–2009) ===
Western Counties North remained a tier 7 league, with promotion continuing to South West 2 West. Relegation was to either Gloucester Premier or Somerset Premier following the cancellation of Gloucestershire/Somerset at the end of the 1999–00 season. From the 2008–09 season the league sponsor was Tribute.

Western Counties North
Season	No of teams	No of matches	Champions	Runners-up	Relegated team(s)	Ref
2000–01	12	22	Cleve	Taunton	Barton Hill, Cirencester, Spartans	
2001–02	12	22	Clevedon	St Mary's Old Boys	North Bristol, Chew Valley	
2002–03	12	22	Coney Hill	Thornbury	Cheltenham North, Old Redcliffians	
2003–04	12	22	Gordon League	Spartans	Gordano, Old Richians, Barton Hill	
2004–05	12	22	Taunton	Thornbury	Matson, Nailsea & Backwell, Drybrook	
2005–06	12	22	Cheltenham North	Walcot	Old Redcliffians, Whitehall, Avonmouth Old Boys	
2006–07	12	22	Yatton	Barton Hill	Keynsham, North Bristol, Gloucester Old Boys	
2007–08	12	22	Avonmouth Old Boys	Old Redcliffians	Spartans, Pershore, Bristol Harlequins	
2008–09	12	22	Hartpury College	Chosen Hill Former Pupils	No relegation (Note: There was no relegation this year as the league changed from 12 to 14 teams for the 2009–10 season due to restructuring of the league system by the RFU.)	
Green background are the promotion places.

=== Western Counties North (2009–2022) ===
Despite widespread league restructuring by the RFU, Western Counties North continues as a tier 7 league, with promotion to South West 1 West (formerly South West 2 West) and relegation to either Gloucester Premier or Somerset Premier. Tribute continue to sponsor the league.

Western Counties North
Season	No of teams	No of matches	Champions	Runners-up	Relegated team(s)	Ref
2009–10	14	26	Old Redcliffians	Thornbury	Widden Old Boys, Southmead, Hornets	
2010–11	14	26	Berry Hill	Thornbury	Drybrook, St Mary's Old Boys	
2011–12	14	26	Chard	Old Centralians	Stroud, Gordon League, Whitehall	
2012–13	14	26	Hornets	Wells	Yatton, Keynsham	
2013–14	14	26	Drybrook	Matson	Oldfield Old Boys, Berry Hill, Cirencester, Midsomer Norton	
2014–15	14	26	Coney Hill	Newent	Stothert & Pitt, North Bristol, Bristol Saracens	
2015–16	14	26	Matson	Keynsham	Barton Hill, Gordano, Bristol Harlequins	
2016–17	14	26	Keynsham	Chew Valley	Avon, Whitehall, Cirencester	
2017–18	14	26	Coney Hill	Chew Valley	Oldfield Old Boys, Yatton, Bristol Saracens	
2018–19	14	26	Chew Valley	Midsomer Norton	Wells, Old Richians, Chosen Hill Former Pupils	
2019–20	14	26	Stroud	Matson	Coney Hill, Bristol Saracens	
2020–21	14	26	Cancelled due to the COVID-19 pandemic in the United Kingdom.			
2021–22	13	24	Matson	Cheltenham	Also promoted: Chosen Hill FP, Gordano and Winscombe. There was no relegation.	
Green background are the promotion places.

=== Counties 1 Western North (2022– ) ===
Following league reorganisation, Western Counties North is renamed Counties 1 Western North and continues to be a tier 7 league. Promotion is to Regional 2 South West and relegation to Counties 2 Gloucester or Counties 2 Somerset. Tribute continue to sponsor the league.

Counties 1 Western North
Season	No of teams	No of matches	Champions	Runners-up	Relegated team(s)	Ref
2022–23	12	22	Cinderford II	Burnham-on-Sea	Cheltenham North (11th) and Avonmouth Old Boys	
2023–24	11	20	Cinderford II	Longlevens	Midsomer Norton (9th), Cleavedon (10th) and Chipping Sodbury (12th)	
2024–25	12	22	Cleve	Clifton II	Cinderford (11th) and Burnham-on-Sea (12th)	
Green background is the promotion place.

== Promotion play-offs ==
Since the 2000–01 season there has been a one-off promotion play-off game played between the league runners-up of Western Counties North and Western Counties West for the third and final promotion place to South West 1 West, with the team with the superior league record having home advantage in the tie. As of the end of the 2018–19 season the northern sides have been the more successful with ten victories to the west's nine while the home team has won thirteen times compared to the away teams six.

Western Counties (north v west) promotion play-off results
Season	Home team	Score	Away team	Venue	Attendance
2000–01	Taunton Titans (N)	24–16	Withycombe (W)	Hyde Park, Taunton, Somerset	
2001–02	St Mary's Old Boys (N)	43–7	Penryn (W)	Trench Lane, Almondsbury, Bristol	
2002–03	Thornbury (N)	12–5	Withycombe (W)	Cooper's Farm, Thornbury, Gloucestershire	
2003–04	Spartans (N)	18–7	Torquay Athletic (W)	Lansdown Road, Gloucester, Gloucestershire	
2004–05	St Ives (W)	27–5	Thornbury (N)	Alexandra Road, St Ives, Cornwall	
2005–06	Newton Abbot (W)	24–12	Walcot (N)	Rackerhayes, Newton Abbot, Devon	
2006–07	Hayle (W)	11–27	Barton Hill (N)	Memorial Park, Hayle, Cornwall	
2007–08	Sidmouth (W)	23–20	Old Redcliffians (N)	Blackmore Field, Sidmouth, Devon	
2008–09	Chosen Hill Former Pupils (N)	33–25	Ivybridge (W)	Brookfield Road, Churchdown, Gloucester	
2009–10	Wadebridge Camels (W)	25–21	Thornbury (N)	Molesworth Field, Wadebridge, Cornwall	
2010–11	Thornbury (N)	54–7	Kingsbridge (W)	Cooper's Farm, Thornbury, Gloucestershire	
2011–12	Old Centralians (N)	39–7	Torquay Athletic (W)	Saintbridge Sports Centre, Gloucester, Gloucestershire	
2012–13	Wells (N)	20–27	Bideford (W)	Charter Way, Wells, Somerset	400
2013–14	Teignmouth (W)	10–35	Matson (N)	Bitton Park Sports Ground, Teignmouth, Devon	
2014–15	Newent (N)	28–26	Kingsbridge (W)	Recreation Ground, Newent, Gloucestershire	
2015–16	Kingsbridge (W)	16–10	Keynsham (N)	High House, Kingsbridge, Devon	
2016–17	Chew Valley (N)	12–29	Cullompton (W)	Chew Lane, Chew Magna, Somerset	700
2017–18	Chew Valley (N)	12–22	Devonport Services (W)	Chew Lane, Chew Magna, Somerset	
2018–19	Midsomer Norton (N)	15–19	Crediton (W)	Norton Down Playing Fields, Midsomer Norton, Somerset	
2019–20	Cancelled due to COVID-19 pandemic in the United Kingdom. Best ranked runner-up – St Austell (W) – promoted instead.				
2020–21	Cancelled due to COVID-19 pandemic in the United Kingdom.				
2021–22	Cancelled due to league reorganisation.				
Green backgrounds represent promoted teams. WCN stands for Western Counties North while WCW stands for Western Counties West.

== Number of league titles ==
- Coney Hill (4)
- Matson (3) (Note: One of Matson's title wins were back when the league was known as Western Counties.)
- Cinderford II (2)
- Cleve (2)
- Gordon League (2) (Note: One of Gordon League's title wins was when the league was known as Western Counties.)
- Hornets (2)
- Keynsham (2)
- Avonmouth Old Boys (1)
- Berry Hill (1)
- Chard (1)
- Cheltenham North (1)
- Chew Valley (1)
- Clevedon (1) (Note: Clevedon's title was when the league was known as Western Counties.)
- Coombe Down (1) (Note: Coombe Down's title win was when the league was known as Western Counties.)
- Dings Crusaders (1) (Note: Coombe Down's title win was when the league was known as Western Counties.)
- Drybrook (1)
- Gloucester Old Boys (1) (Note: Gloucester Old Boys title win was when the league was known as Western Counties.)
- Hartpury College (1)
- Launceston (1) (Note: Launceston's title win was when the league was known as Western Counties.)
- Old Patesians (1) (Note: Old Patesians title win was back when the league was known as Western Counties.)
- Old Redcliffians (1)
- Penryn (1) (Note: Penryn's title win was when the league was known as Western Counties.)
- St Mary's Old Boys (1)
- Stroud (1)
- Taunton (1)
- Yatton (1)

== Sponsorship ==
The Western Counties League and South West 2 were part of the Courage Clubs Championship and was sponsored by Courage Brewery from the first season, 1987–88 to season 1996–97. The league was unsponsored until season 2007–08 when St Austell Brewery sponsored South-west based leagues under the Tribute Ale label.

== See also ==
- South West Division RFU
- Gloucestershire RFU
- Somerset RFU
- English rugby union system
- Rugby union in England
