= North Gloucestershire Combination Senior Cup =

- Sport: Rugby union
- Instituted: 1903; 123 years ago
- Number of teams: 13
- Country: England
- Holders: Old Centralians (6th title) (2025-26)
- Most titles: Matson (31 titles)
- Website: North Gloucestershire Combination

The North Gloucestershire Combination Senior Cup is an annual rugby union knock-out club competition organised by the North Gloucestershire Combination – one of the five bodies that make up the Gloucestershire Rugby Football Union. It was first introduced during the 1903–04 season, with the inaugural winners being Berkley and is the most important rugby union competition in north Gloucestershire, ahead of the Junior Cup and Glanville Cup.

The Senior Cup is currently open for clubs sides based in Gloucester and north Gloucestershire, playing all the way from tier 5 (National League 3 South West) to tier 11 (Gloucester 3) of the English rugby union league system. The format is a knockout cup with a first round, quarter-finals, semi-finals and a final to be held at Kingsholm in Gloucester in April–May alongside the Junior and Glanville Cup finals.

== North Gloucestershire Combination Senior Cup winners ==
North Gloucestershire Combination Senior Cup Finals
Season	Winner	Score	Runners–up	Venue
1903–04	Berkley			
1904–05	Bream			
1905–06	South End			
1906–07	St Marks			
1907–08	Whitecroft			
1908–09	St Marks			
1909–10	St Marks			
1910–11	No result recorded			
1911–12	No result recorded			
1912–13	Gordon League			
1913–14	St Marks			
1914–19	No competition due to World War I			
1919–20	South End			
1920–21	Tredworth			
1921–22	St Marks			
1922–23	St Marks			
1923–24	West End			
1924–25	West End			
1925–26	West End			
1926–27	West End			
1927–28	Widden Old Boys			
1928–29	Gordon League			
1929–30	Widden Old Boys			
1930–31	Widden Old Boys			
1931–32	Gordon League			
1932–33	Widden Old Boys			
1933–34	Gordon League			
1934–35	Gordon League			
1935–36	No competition			
1936–37	Atlas Works			
1937–38	Atlas Works			
1938–39	Gordon League			
1939–48	No competition due to World War II			
1948–49	Coney Hill			Kingsholm, Gloucester, Gloucestershire
1949–50	Tredworth			Kingsholm, Gloucester, Gloucestershire
1950–51	Tredworth			Kingsholm, Gloucester, Gloucestershire
1951–52	Spartans			Kingsholm, Gloucester, Gloucestershire
1952–53	Gordon League			Kingsholm, Gloucester, Gloucestershire
1953–54	Coney Hill			Kingsholm, Gloucester, Gloucestershire
1954–55	Gordon League			Kingsholm, Gloucester, Gloucestershire
1955–56	Gordon League / Spartans (Note: The 1955–56 Senior Cup was shared between Gordon League and Spartans.)		N/A	Kingsholm, Gloucester, Gloucestershire
1956–57	Gordon League			Kingsholm, Gloucester, Gloucestershire
1957–58	Gordon League			Kingsholm, Gloucester, Gloucestershire
1958–59	Widden Old Boys			Kingsholm, Gloucester, Gloucestershire
1959–60	Gordon League			Kingsholm, Gloucester, Gloucestershire
1960–61	Longlevens			Kingsholm, Gloucester, Gloucestershire
1961–62	Tredworth			Kingsholm, Gloucester, Gloucestershire
1962–63	Matson			Kingsholm, Gloucester, Gloucestershire
1963–64	Matson			Kingsholm, Gloucester, Gloucestershire
1964–65	Matson			Kingsholm, Gloucester, Gloucestershire
1965–66	Matson			Kingsholm, Gloucester, Gloucestershire
1966–67	Matson			Kingsholm, Gloucester, Gloucestershire
1967–68	Gordon League			Kingsholm, Gloucester, Gloucestershire
1968–69	Matson			Kingsholm, Gloucester, Gloucestershire
1969–70	Matson			Kingsholm, Gloucester, Gloucestershire
1970–71	Matson			Kingsholm, Gloucester, Gloucestershire
1971–72	Matson			Kingsholm, Gloucester, Gloucestershire
1972–73	Matson			Kingsholm, Gloucester, Gloucestershire
1973–74	Matson			Kingsholm, Gloucester, Gloucestershire
1974–75	Gordon League			Kingsholm, Gloucester, Gloucestershire
1975–76	Gordon League		Old Centralians	Kingsholm, Gloucester, Gloucestershire
1976–77	Gordon League			Kingsholm, Gloucester, Gloucestershire
1977–78	Matson			Kingsholm, Gloucester, Gloucestershire
1978–79	Matson			Kingsholm, Gloucester, Gloucestershire
1979–80	Matson			Kingsholm, Gloucester, Gloucestershire
1980–81	Matson			Kingsholm, Gloucester, Gloucestershire
1981–82	Matson			Kingsholm, Gloucester, Gloucestershire
1982–83	Matson			Kingsholm, Gloucester, Gloucestershire
1983–84	Coney Hill			Kingsholm, Gloucester, Gloucestershire
1984–85	Coney Hill			Kingsholm, Gloucester, Gloucestershire
1985–86	Coney Hill			Kingsholm, Gloucester, Gloucestershire
1986–87	Matson			Kingsholm, Gloucester, Gloucestershire
1987–88	Matson			Kingsholm, Gloucester, Gloucestershire
1988–89	Matson			Kingsholm, Gloucester, Gloucestershire
1989–90	Matson			Kingsholm, Gloucester, Gloucestershire
1990–91	Gloucester Old Boys / Spartans (Note: The 1990–91 Senior Cup was shared between Gloucester Old Boys and Spartans.)		N/A	Kingsholm, Gloucester, Gloucestershire
1991–92	Spartans			Kingsholm, Gloucester, Gloucestershire
1992–93	Matson			Kingsholm, Gloucester, Gloucestershire
1993–94	Matson			Kingsholm, Gloucester, Gloucestershire
1994–95	Gloucester Old Boys			Kingsholm, Gloucester, Gloucestershire
1995–96	Spartans			Kingsholm, Gloucester, Gloucestershire
1996–97	Matson			Kingsholm, Gloucester, Gloucestershire
1997–98	Coney Hill			Kingsholm, Gloucester, Gloucestershire
1998–99	Matson			Kingsholm, Gloucester, Gloucestershire
1999-00	Matson			Kingsholm, Gloucester, Gloucestershire
2000–01	Matson			Kingsholm, Gloucester, Gloucestershire
2001–02	Coney Hill	19-7	Spartans	Kingsholm, Gloucester, Gloucestershire
2002–03	Coney Hill	64-7	Old Centralians	Kingsholm, Gloucester, Gloucestershire
2003–04	Coney Hill	31-20	Spartans	Kingsholm, Gloucester, Gloucestershire
2004–05	Coney Hill	27-24	Spartans	Kingsholm, Gloucester, Gloucestershire
2005–06	Coney Hill		Chosen Hill	Kingsholm, Gloucester, Gloucestershire
2006–07	Coney Hill		Widden Old Boys	Kingsholm, Gloucester, Gloucestershire
2007–08	Coney Hill			Kingsholm, Gloucester, Gloucestershire
2008–09	Coney Hill	6–3	Gordon League	Kingsholm, Gloucester, Gloucestershire
2009–10	Coney Hill		Matson	Kingsholm, Gloucester, Gloucestershire
2010–11	Coney Hill	19–14	Old Centralians	Kingsholm, Gloucester, Gloucestershire
2011–12	Old Centralians	34–10	Matson	Kingsholm, Gloucester, Gloucestershire
2012–13	Coney Hill	6–5	Old Centralians	Kingsholm, Gloucester, Gloucestershire
2013–14	Matson	17–10	Coney Hill	Kingsholm, Gloucester, Gloucestershire
2014–15	Old Centralians	58–17	Chosen Hill Former Pupils	Kingsholm, Gloucester, Gloucestershire
2015–16	Matson	26–7	Hucclecote	Kingsholm, Gloucester, Gloucestershire
2016–17	Old Centralians	26–16	Coney Hill	Kingsholm, Gloucester, Gloucestershire
2017–18	Old Centralians	26–15	Coney Hill	Kingsholm, Gloucester, Gloucestershire
2018-19	Old Centralians	17-15	Matson	Kingsholm, Gloucester, Gloucestershire
2019-20	No competition due to COVID-19			Kingsholm, Gloucester, Gloucestershire
2020-21	No competition due to COVID-19			Kingsholm, Gloucester, Gloucestershire
2021-22	Matson	27-10	Chosen Hill Former Pupils	Kingsholm, Gloucester, Gloucestershire
2022-23	Longlevens	42-32	Matson	Kingsholm, Gloucester, Gloucestershire
2023-24	Matson	26-24	Old Centralians	Kingsholm, Gloucester, Gloucestershire
2024-25	Longlevens	31-07	Matson	Kingsholm, Gloucester, Gloucestershire
2025-26	Old Centralians	24-21	Matson	Hucclecote RFC

== Number of wins ==
- Matson (31)
- Coney Hill (17)
- Gordon League (16) (Note: Gordon League's total includes 1 shared title.)
- Old Centralians (6)
- St Marks (6)
- Spartans (5) (Note: Spartans total includes 2 shared titles.)
- Widden Old Boys (5)
- Tredworth (4)
- West End (4)
- Longlevens (3)
- Atlas Works (2)
- Gloucester Old Boys (2)
- South End (2)
- Berkley (1)
- Bream (1)
- Whitecroft (1)

== See also ==
- North Gloucestershire Combination
- Gloucestershire RFU
- North Gloucestershire Combination Junior Cup
- North Gloucestershire Combination Glanville Cup
- English rugby union system
- Rugby union in England
