= North Gloucestershire Combination Junior Cup =

Rugby competition in England

- Sport: Rugby Union
- Instituted: 1913; 113 years ago
- Number of teams: 13
- Country: England
- Holders: Gordon League II (18th title) (2016–17)
- Most titles: Gordon League (18 titles)
- Website: North Gloucestershire Combination

The North Gloucestershire Combination Junior Cup is an annual rugby union knock-out club competition organised by the North Gloucestershire Combination — one of the five bodies that make up the Gloucestershire Rugby Football Union. It was first introduced during the 1913–14 season, with the inaugural winners being St. Marks 'A'. It is the second most important rugby union cup competition in north Gloucestershire, ahead of the Glanville Cup but behind the Senior Cup.

The Junior Cup is currently open for clubs based in Gloucester and north Gloucestershire which are the 2nd teams of sides playing in the Senior Cup – although in the past the first teams of lower-ranked clubs have also entered (for example when Old Cryptians won the Junior Cup in 2014). The format is a knockout cup with a first round, quarter-finals, semi-finals, and a final to be held at Kingsholm in Gloucester in April–May alongside the Senior and Glanville Cup finals.

== North Gloucestershire Combination Junior Cup winners ==
North Gloucestershire Combination Junior Cup Finals
Season	Winner	Score	Runners–up	Venue
1913–14	St Marks 'A'			
1914–21	No competition due to World War I			
1921–22	West End 'A'			
1922–23	West End 'A'			
1923–24	West End 'A'			
1924–25	Gordon League			
1925–26	West End 'A'			
1926–27	West End 'A'			
1927–28	Spartans			
1928–29	Atlas Works			
1929–30	Gordon League			
1930–31	Gloucester All Blues			
1931–32	Tredworth			
1932–33	Gordon League 'A'			
1933–34	Gordon League 'A'			
1934–35	No result recorded			
1935–36	No result recorded			
1936–37	Atlas Works 'A'			
1937–38	Gordon League 'A'			
1938–39	No result recorded			
1939–48	No competition due to World War II			
1948–49	R.N.O.C.A.			Kingsholm, Gloucester, Gloucestershire
1949–50	Coney Hill 'A'			Kingsholm, Gloucester, Gloucestershire
1950–51	Gordon League 'A'			Kingsholm, Gloucester, Gloucestershire
1951–52	Coney Hill 'A'			Kingsholm, Gloucester, Gloucestershire
1952–53	Gloucester All Blues 'A'			Kingsholm, Gloucester, Gloucestershire
1953–54	Painswick			Kingsholm, Gloucester, Gloucestershire
1954–55	Gordon League 'A'			Kingsholm, Gloucester, Gloucestershire
1955–56	Gordon League 'A'			Kingsholm, Gloucester, Gloucestershire
1956–57	Longlevens			Kingsholm, Gloucester, Gloucestershire
1957–58	Painswick			Kingsholm, Gloucester, Gloucestershire
1958–59	Spartans 'A'			Kingsholm, Gloucester, Gloucestershire
1959–60	Matson			Kingsholm, Gloucester, Gloucestershire
1960–61	Matson			Kingsholm, Gloucester, Gloucestershire
1961–62	Churchdown			Kingsholm, Gloucester, Gloucestershire
1962–63	Longlevens			Kingsholm, Gloucester, Gloucestershire
1963–64	Longlevens			Kingsholm, Gloucester, Gloucestershire
1964–65	Old Centralians II		Longlevens	Kingsholm, Gloucester, Gloucestershire
1965–66	BNS			Kingsholm, Gloucester, Gloucestershire
1966–67	Gordon League 'A'			Kingsholm, Gloucester, Gloucestershire
1967–68	Gordon League 'A'			Kingsholm, Gloucester, Gloucestershire
1968–69	Tredworth II			Kingsholm, Gloucester, Gloucestershire
1969–70	Tredworth II			Kingsholm, Gloucester, Gloucestershire
1970–71	Matson II			Kingsholm, Gloucester, Gloucestershire
1971–72	Old Richians 'A'			Kingsholm, Gloucester, Gloucestershire
1972–73	Old Richians 'A'			Kingsholm, Gloucester, Gloucestershire
1973–74	Old Cryptians 'A'			Kingsholm, Gloucester, Gloucestershire
1974–75	Gordon League 'A'			Kingsholm, Gloucester, Gloucestershire
1975–76	Tredworth II			Kingsholm, Gloucester, Gloucestershire
1976–77	Coney Hill			Kingsholm, Gloucester, Gloucestershire
1977–78	Gordon League			Kingsholm, Gloucester, Gloucestershire
1978–79	Matson II			Kingsholm, Gloucester, Gloucestershire
1979–80	Gordon League II			Kingsholm, Gloucester, Gloucestershire
1980–81	Matson II		Old Centralians II	Kingsholm, Gloucester, Gloucestershire
1981–82	Saintbridge Former Pupils			Kingsholm, Gloucester, Gloucestershire
1982–83	Gordon League II		Old Centralians II	Kingsholm, Gloucester, Gloucestershire
1983–84	Coney Hill II			Kingsholm, Gloucester, Gloucestershire
1984–85	Matson II			Kingsholm, Gloucester, Gloucestershire
1985–86	Coney Hill II			Kingsholm, Gloucester, Gloucestershire
1986–87	Matson II			Kingsholm, Gloucester, Gloucestershire
1987–88	Matson II			Kingsholm, Gloucester, Gloucestershire
1988–89	Spartans 'A'			Kingsholm, Gloucester, Gloucestershire
1989–90	Spartans A'			Kingsholm, Gloucester, Gloucestershire
1990–91	Gordon League II			Kingsholm, Gloucester, Gloucestershire
1991–92	Matson II			Kingsholm, Gloucester, Gloucestershire
1992–93	Matson II			Kingsholm, Gloucester, Gloucestershire
1993–94	Matson II			Kingsholm, Gloucester, Gloucestershire
1994–95	Matson II			Kingsholm, Gloucester, Gloucestershire
1995–96	Spartans II			Kingsholm, Gloucester, Gloucestershire
1996–97	Matson II			Kingsholm, Gloucester, Gloucestershire
1997–98	Matson II			Kingsholm, Gloucester, Gloucestershire
1998–99	Matson II			Kingsholm, Gloucester, Gloucestershire
1999-00	Coney Hill II		Old Centralians II	Kingsholm, Gloucester, Gloucestershire
2000–01	Old Centralians II		Matson II	Kingsholm, Gloucester, Gloucestershire
2001–02	Gordon League II			Kingsholm, Gloucester, Gloucestershire
2002–03	Gordon League II			Kingsholm, Gloucester, Gloucestershire
2003–04	Matson II			Kingsholm, Gloucester, Gloucestershire
2004–05	Coney Hill II			Kingsholm, Gloucester, Gloucestershire
2005–06	Coney Hill II			Kingsholm, Gloucester, Gloucestershire
2006–07	Coney Hill II			Kingsholm, Gloucester, Gloucestershire
2007–08	Coney Hill II			Kingsholm, Gloucester, Gloucestershire
2008–09	Coney Hill II		Matson II	Kingsholm, Gloucester, Gloucestershire
2009–10	Coney Hill II		Old Centralians II	Kingsholm, Gloucester, Gloucestershire
2010–11	Coney Hill II	42–20	Matson II	Kingsholm, Gloucester, Gloucestershire
2011–12	Coney Hill II	22–12	Widden Old Boys II	Kingsholm, Gloucester, Gloucestershire
2012–13	Old Centralians II	22–12	Coney Hill II	Kingsholm, Gloucester, Gloucestershire
2013–14	Old Cryptians	26–8	Coney Hill II	Kingsholm, Gloucester, Gloucestershire
2014–15	Chosen Hill Former Pupils II	27–10	Matson II	Kingsholm, Gloucester, Gloucestershire
2015–16	Matson II	30–11	Chosen Hill Former Pupils II	Kingsholm, Gloucester, Gloucestershire
2016–17	Old Centralians II	40–7	Matson II	Kingsholm, Gloucester, Gloucestershire
2017–18	Gordon League II	26–12	Coney Hill II	

== Number of wins ==
- Gordon League (18)
- Matson (17)
- Coney Hill (13)
- Spartans (5)
- West End (5)
- Old Centralians (4)
- Tredworth (4)
- Longlevens (3)
- Atlas Works (2)
- Gloucester All Blues (2)
- Old Cryptians (2)
- Old Richians (2)
- Painswick (2)
- BNS (1)
- Chosen Hill Former Pupils (1)
- Churchdown (1)
- Old Cryptians) (1)
- R.N.O.C.A. (1)
- St Marks (1)

== See also ==
- North Gloucestershire Combination
- Gloucestershire RFU
- North Gloucestershire Combination Senior Cup
- North Gloucestershire Combination Glanville Cup
- English rugby union system
- Rugby union in England
