= Newbury R.F.C. =

English rugby union club, based in Newbury

Newbury
- Full name: Newbury Rugby Football Club
- Union: Berkshire RFU
- Founded: 1928; 98 years ago
- Location: Newbury, Berkshire, England
- Ground: Monks Lane (Capacity: 8,000)
- Chairman: Louise Goodall
- President: David Jones
- Coach: Paul Archer
- Captain: Dan Thorne
- League: Regional 2 South Central
- 2024–25: 8th (level transfer to Regional 2 Severn)

Official website
- www.newburyrugby.co.uk

Newbury Rugby Football Club is a rugby union club based in Newbury, Berkshire, England. Following league reorganisation, they play in Regional 2 Severn, a league at tier 6 in the English rugby union system. Newbury RFC is a community rugby club using players drawn from the local community and those coached through its youth rugby programme.

== History ==
The club was founded in 1928 due to the efforts of Len Whittaker who left St. Bartholomews Grammar School in 1924. The first game took place on 15th September 1928 against Stoke RFC. This was the first of 23 games that season, during which the club won 13 matches and lost 10. Even throughout the early years of the club, the standard of play encouraged major sides such as Northampton, Gloucester, Harlequins, and Wasps to play against Newbury.

In 1932 the club found a permanent home where they stayed until 1952 at which time the club moved to Pinchington Lane to the south of the town. It was not until 1958 that a clubhouse could be built on the site which was less than a mile from the present headquarters at Monks Lane where they have five pitches, of which three are fully floodlit. The 1938–39 season saw Newbury unofficially crowned by the local press as "Champions of Berkshire". The first game to be played after the War was on 13 April 1946 and despite the inauspicious date, the club won the match 37 – 0 against Windsor.

When the league system for English rugby started in 1987, Newbury was playing in a regional league – Courage South West 1. They were relegated at the end of their first season, but by the 1990–91 season, they were back in South West 1 and then promoted a second time, having finished as runners-up.

By the 1994–95 season, they had been relegated back into South West 1, and again finished runners-up. In this season, there was no promotion place for runners-up. The following season, however, The Blues were promoted back into the National League as champions of South West 1.

The 1996–97 season saw the advent of professionalism in English Rugby, along with the reduction in the number of tiers in the league from 5 to 4. The Blues spent the season in the 4th tier (known as National 4 South at the time) and enjoyed their second successive promotion, again as champions.

The next eight seasons were spent in the third tier (known as the Jewson National League 1 for the first three seasons, latterly changing to National Division 2 following the league restructure at the end of the 1999–00 season). The Blues finished 7th, 5th, 5th, 9th, 8th, 9th, and 8th, before finishing as runners-up in 2004–05 and finally achieving the fifth promotion of their league career.

In their first season in the second tier of English rugby (known at the time as National Division One), The Blues finished 11th under coach Ben Ryan, and achieved the same placement the following season.

The Blues' third season in the second tier was slightly less successful, with the team finishing in 13th place in 2007–08 under coach Chris Dossett, and in 2008-09 Newbury finished 3rd-bottom with just 4 wins under coach Ben Sturnham. In normal seasons this would have resulted in a narrow escape from relegation, but with another league restructure undertaken at the end of the season there were five teams relegated instead of the usual two, taking The Blues back down to National League One (the 3rd tier) for the first time since the 2004–05 season.

The 2009–10 season saw The Blues suffer a second successive relegation under Ben Sturnham, despite winning 12 games, and they were relegated to the fourth tier (National League 2) for the first time since 1997.

In 2010–11, under coach Andy Widdop, The Blues hit new lows, winning just one game and achieving an unwanted division record of 2,055 points conceded. Naturally, this resulted in a last-place finish and a third successive relegation.

Mike Marchant took over as coach for the 2011–12 season in National League 3 South West, but The Blues did only slightly better than the previous season, winning just two games. They were relegated at the end of the season to the sixth tier, South West Division One East. This was reported in local media at the time as being lower than the league where Newbury Blues started their league careers, although this is debatable as South West Division One East was by now the equivalent league to South West 2, where Newbury Blues spent the 1987–88 season.

In 2012–13 The Blues' finally arrested their slide down the divisions and managed to avoid a fifth successive relegation by winning ten games and finishing a creditable 9th in the division. Former Samoan international Ngapaku Ngapaku (known as Pux) was coach.

Pux left at the end of the season, having guided The Blues to survival for the first time since 2009, and Lee Goodall took over the head coach role. 2013–14 saw The Blues finish 11th with eight wins, before winning 15 games in the 2014–15 season and finishing 6th.

The 2015–16 season was The Blues' most successful in a long time, with 21 wins, including a 14-game winning streak that saw them win every single game in 2016, resulting in a third-place finish and only a lack of bonus points denying The Blues a play-off place (Salisbury had 20 wins to Newbury’s 21, but had picked up 14 bonus points to Newbury’s 8).

Building on the previous season's success the 2016–17 season ended with The Blues in second position and into the play-off match against Clevedon RFC in April to decide who would be promoted up into National League 3 South West (renamed South West Premier for season 2017–18). With 21 wins, 1 draw, and 4 losses the match statistics were the same as the previous season, but what were markedly different ways in the try bonus points, with 17 against the previous season's 7. The match finished 25–22 with Newbury the victors and promotion.

On 28 April 2018 The Blues' were once again relegated, despite having won 13 of the 26 games in the season. They finished with 64 points, and had the best defensive record in the league after table toppers Dings Crusaders, beat Bournemouth, Maidenhead and Newtown Abbot both home and away who finished second, third and fourth in the league respectively, but with just 7 try-scoring bonus points during the season it was not enough to keep out of the relegation zone and on the final day of an extended season, they missed out on staying up by one point.

The 2018–19 season in the Wadworth 6X South West One East division did however get off to a great start with a 67–7 away win against Stratford-Upon-Avon, which was followed up with an 85–0 home win against Swindon.

== Honours ==
1st team:

- Courage South West 1 champions: 1995–96
- Courage League Division 4 South champions: 1996–97
- South West 1 (east v west) promotion play-off winners: 2016–17
- South West 1 East champions: 2018–19

2nd team (Newbury Stags):

- Berks/Bucks & Oxon 1 South champions: 2004–05
- Berks/Bucks & Oxon Premier champions (2): 2005–06, 2008–09

3rd team:

- Berks/Bucks & Oxon 4 champions: 2011–12
- Berks/Bucks & Oxon 3 South champions: 2012–13

== Youth teams ==
Newbury RFC is widely regarded as having an above average youth team, and are currently sponsored by the local solicitors Thomas Eggar. There is a tradition at Monks Lane where the first team squad are often known to help out with training the youth team, and have previously won at a high level more clearly than the youth section, whose teams often win at county level and have represented Newbury at Twickenham stadium.
