= Berry Hill RFC =

English rugby union club, based in Coleford, Gloucestershire

(England) Berry Hill
- Full name: Berry Hill Rugby Football Club
- Union: Gloucestershire Rugby Football Union
- Founded: 1892; 134 years ago
- Location: Coleford, Gloucestershire
- Ground: Lakers Road
- Chairman: Nick Harris
- Captain: Josh element
- League: Counties 3 Gloucestershire
- 2024/25: 11th
Team kit

Official website
- www.berryhillrfc.co.uk

Berry Hill Rugby Football Club is a rugby union club located in Coleford, Gloucestershire. The first XV currently plays in Gloucester Premier, an eighth tier league in the English rugby union system. The club also operates two additional senior sides and a junior section for ages 6 to 17.

== League history ==
When the league system was established in 1987, Berry Hill was placed in South West 2. It was a successful season for the club as not only did they win promotion but Berry Hill also reached the last 16 of the John Player Cup. Four seasons later they were promoted to the national divisions and played in 1992–93 Courage National 4 South. Reorganisation saw the club placed in Courage League Division 5 South for the following season. They played in that division throughout that competition's three year history and were placed back National 4 South for the 1996-97 season. However they were immediately relegated to South West 1 West and played in the South West divisions until relegation from South West 1 West in 2012. Two years later they were relegated again, this time to local rugby.

== Club honours ==
- South West 2 champions 1987-88
- South West 1 champions 1991-92
- South West 1 play-off winners 2001-02
- Tribute Western Counties North champions 2010–11
- Gloucester 1 champions 2017-18
