= Matson RFC =

Rugby union club, based in Gloucestershire

- Full name: Matson Rugby Football Club
- Union: Gloucestershire RFU
- Founded: 1957; 69 years ago
- Location: Matson, Gloucestershire, England
- League: Regional 1 South West
- 2025–26: 12th (relegated to Regional 2 Severn)
Team kit

Official website
- www.pitchero.com/clubs/matson

Matson Rugby Football Club is a rugby union club based in Matson, Gloucestershire, England. The first XV currently play in Regional 2 Severn, following their relegation from Regional 1 South West in 2026. As well as the first XV, the club operates a second XV, a third XV, Matson Colts and the full age range of junior sides.

== History ==
The club was founded in September 1957 following the construction of a new council estate with most of the players coming from this area of Matson.

With the introduction of league rugby in 1987, Matson were placed in the Counties 1 Western North league, and they were the champions in the inaugural season. The club was promoted to Regional 1 South West in 2023, and in 2025 finished 7th; their highest league position.

The club has achieved many victories in county cup competitions, with its various teams winning on 66 different occasions. The first XV has won the North Gloucestershire Combination Senior Cup 29 times. This included twelve wins between 1963 and 1974, with the exception of 1967–68, six consecutive victories between 1977 and 1982 and four more successive Senior Cup victories at the end of the 1980s. Also, the club's second XV has lifted the North Gloucestershire Combination Junior Cup 17 times and the third XV has won the North Gloucestershire Combination Glanville Cup on twenty occasions.

== Honours ==
- Counties 1 Western North champions: 1987–88
- Counties 1 Western North champions: 2013–14
- Regional 2 Severn champions: 2022–23
- North Gloucestershire Combination Senior Cup winners: 29 occasions
- North Gloucestershire Combination Junior Cup winners: 17 times
- North Gloucestershire Combination Glanville Cup winners: 20 occasions
