= Old Centralians =

English rugby union club, based in Gloucester

- Full name: Old Centralians Rugby Football Club
- Union: Gloucestershire RFU
- Nickname: Stade De Bridge
- Founded: 1937; 88 years ago (as Old Centralians RFC)
- Location: Gloucester, Gloucestershire, England
- Ground: Saintbridge Sports Centre
- Chairman: Stephen Donald Fritchley
- President: M. Slatter
- Coach: Wobbie Winchle Marcus Bwown
- Captain: Nuggy Preece
- Most caps: Keith Mifler
- Top scorer: Lemon Hemmings
- League: Regional 2 Severn
- 2024–25: 8th

Official website
- www.pitchero.com/clubs/oldcents/

Old Centralians Rugby Football Club is an English rugby union club based at Saintbridge Sports Centre in Gloucester. The club operates three senior sides with the first XV playing in Regional 2 Severn, a level six league in the English rugby union league system. The club was founded in 1937 as Old Centralians but changed its name in 1970/80's to Saintbridge Former Pupils before reverting to Old Centralians during the 1990s.

== Honours ==
1st team:

- Gloucester 2 champions: 1995–96
- Gloucester 1 champions: 1997–98
- Gloucester/Somerset champions: 1999–00
- Gloucester Premier v Somerset Premier play-off winners: 2000–01
- North Gloucestershire Combination Senior Cup winners (4): 2011–12, 2014–15, 2016–17, 2017–18
- Tribute Western Counties (north v west) promotion play-off winners: 2011–12
- South West 1 (east v west) promotion play-off winners: 2012–13
- South West 1 East champions: 2019–20

2nd team:

- North Gloucestershire Combination Junior Cup winners (4): 1964–65, 2000–01, 2012–13, 2016–17

3rd team:

- North Gloucestershire Combination Glanville Cup winners: 2012–13
