= Coney Hill RFC =

English rugby union team

(England) Coney Hill
- Full name: Coney Hill Rugby Football Club
- Union: Gloucestershire RFU
- Founded: 1947; 79 years ago
- Location: Gloucester, Gloucestershire, England
- Ground: Metz Way
- Chairman: Adam Pettigrew
- President: Ken Stokes
- Coach: Jake Marsh
- Captain: Joe Twomey
- League: Counties 3 Gloucestershire North

Official website
- www.pitchero.com/clubs/coneyhill/

Coney Hill Rugby Football Club is an English rugby union team based in Gloucester, Gloucestershire. The club run two senior teams and several junior teams — from Under 7's through to Colts . The first currently play in Counties 3 Gloucestershire North - a level nine league in the English rugby union system.

== History ==
The Coney Hill Rugby Football Club was officially formed in 1947 by old soldiers returning from Dunkirk to their homes in Coney Hill.

== Honours ==
1st team:

- North Gloucestershire Combination Senior Cup winners (17): 1949, 1954, 1984, 1985, 1986, 1998, 2002, 2003, 2004, 2005, 2006, 2007, 2008, 2009, 2010, 2011, 2013
- Gloucestershire/Somerset champions: 1996–97
- Western Counties North champions (4): 1999–00, 2002–03, 2014–15, 2017–18
- South West 2 West champions: 2006–07
- South West Intermediate Cup winners: 2018

2nd team:

- North Gloucestershire Combination Junior Cup winners (12): 1950, 1951, 1984, 1986, 2000, 2005, 2006, 2007, 2008, 2009, 2010, 2011, 2012

3rd team:

- North Gloucestershire Combination Glanville Cup winners (11): 1977, 1987, 2002, 2006, 2007, 2009, 2010, 2011, 2012, 2014, 2016
