= Matson, Gloucester =

Suburb of Gloucester, England

Coordinates: 51°50′N 2°13′W

Matson
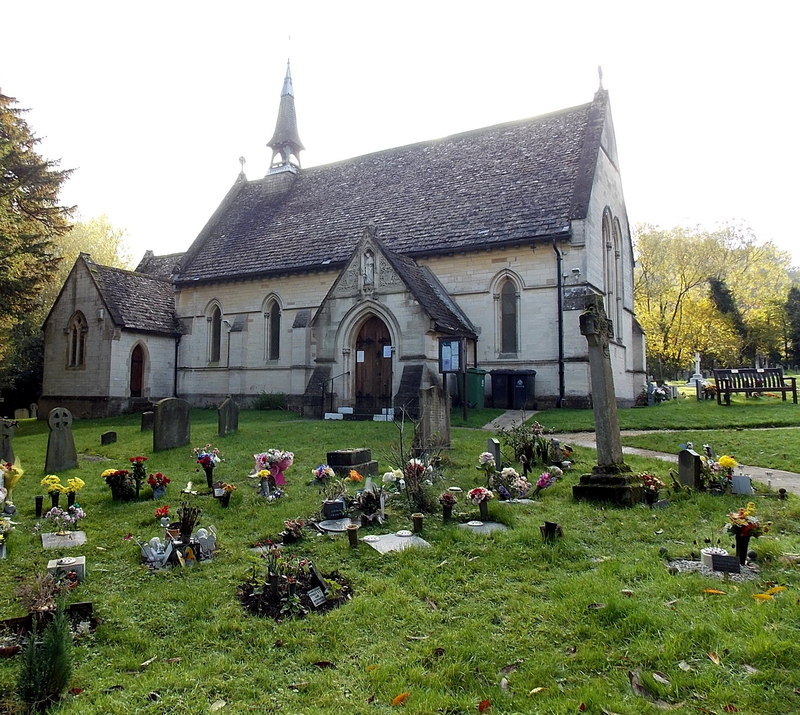
- St Katharine's Church

- Location within Gloucestershire
- District: Gloucester
- Shire county: Gloucestershire
- Region: South West
- Country: England
- Sovereign state: United Kingdom

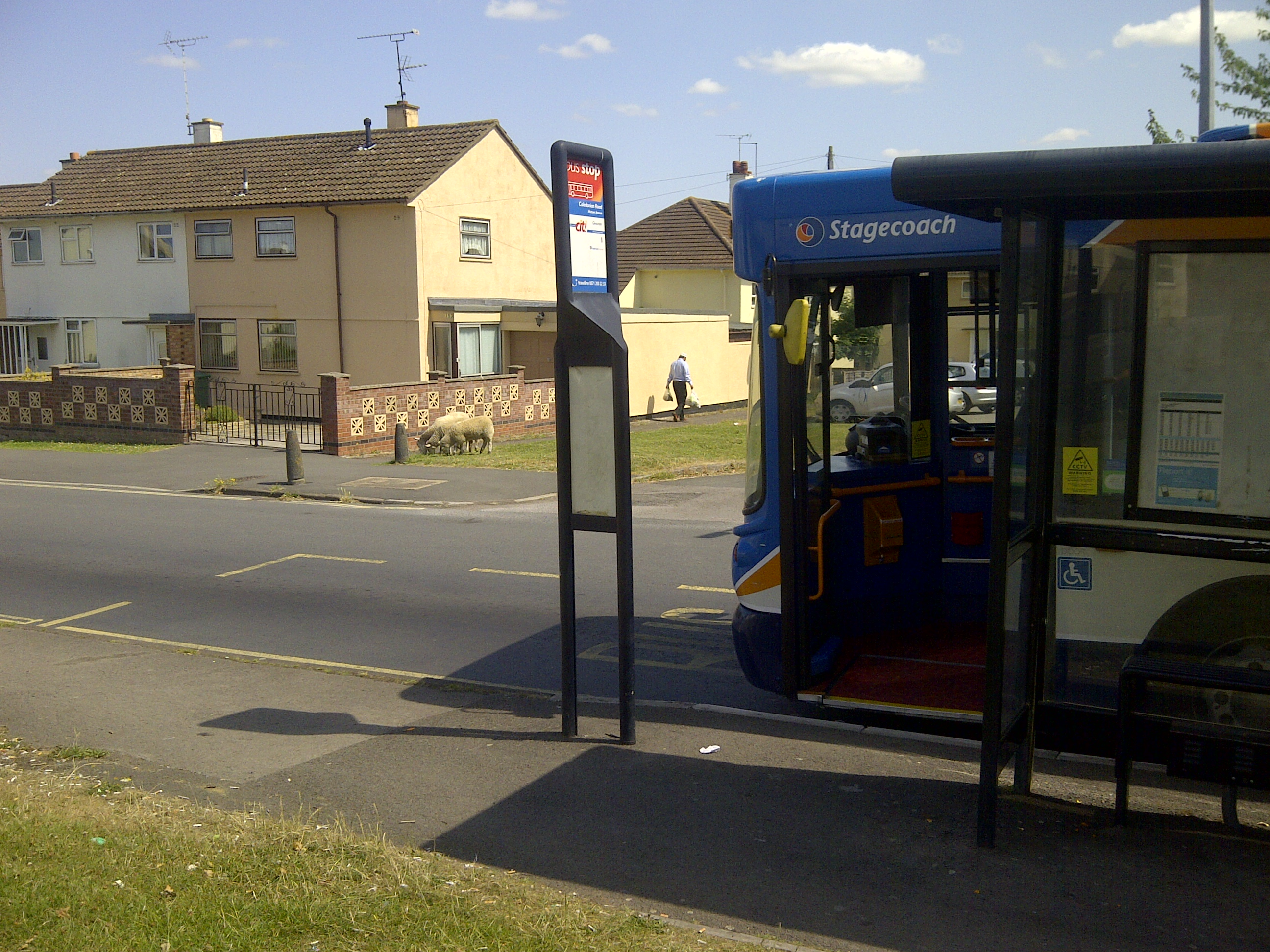
MAN 18.220 ALX300 22378 on a Stagecoach West service 1 to Gloucester City at the Matson terminus with sheep grazing nearby

Matson is a suburb of Gloucester, in the county of Gloucestershire, England.

== History ==
Matson is not mentioned in the Domesday Book. It appears to have been a part of Kings Barton at the time of the survey. The origins of the name are unclear but early versions recorded include Matesknolle, Mattesdune and Matesden and it is likely that the names refer to Robinswood Hill, a large hill which lay entirely within the ancient parish of Matson, on the flanks of which the village lies.

It has been suggested that iron ore was mined from Robinswood Hill in Saxon times although there is little evidence for this. A spring called the Red Well rising just above Matson is ferruginous in nature.

Matson House, a large manorial house, was the headquarters of King Charles during the Siege of Gloucester. It subsequently became the property of Major General William Selwyn in 1679. It is now (2017) the Selwyn Care Home.

A memorial erected in St Katherine's Churchyard in 1920 commemorates Matson parishioners who lost their lives in World War I. It is in the style of a medieval lantern cross and is Grade II listed.

Matson is a former civil parish. In 1931 the parish had a population of 40. On 1 April 1935 the civil parish was abolished. The vast majority was transferred to Gloucester, with small acreages to Brookthorpe and Upton St. Leonards.

The housing estate, which occupies the majority of Matson, was built between the 1950s and 1970s. Many housed dock and factory workers, many of whom worked at the Gloucester Docks.

== 1950s to present ==
A council estate was built in the village after the Second World War. Matson has a shopping parade, doctor's surgery, Neighbourhood Project and several churches. The M5 motorway and Gloucester services are nearby.

Gloucester Ski and Snowboard Centre is on Robinswood Hill, off Matson Lane. The ski slope opened in 1974.

Matson police station closed in 1994. The Musket public house permanently closed in 2009 and was demolished a year later. Housing has been built on the site.

Parmjit Dhanda, former MP for Gloucester (2001-2010), lived in Matson with his family.

Celebrity chef Tom Kerridge named his fruity sauce "Matson" after the curry sauce he used to buy from his local chipshop on the Matson estate.
