= Counties 4 Gloucestershire =

English rugby union leagues

- Current season or competition: 2024–25 Counties 4 Gloucestershire
- Sport: Rugby union
- Instituted: 1987; 39 years ago (as Gloucestershire 2)
- Number of teams: 8
- Country: England
- Most titles: Bream (3 titles)
- Website: englandrugby.com

Counties 4 Gloucestershire (formerly 'Gloucester 2 North / South') are English rugby union leagues which sits at the tenth level of league rugby union in England for teams primarily based in Gloucestershire as well as some teams from Bristol. Promoted clubs move into Counties 3 Gloucestershire (North) or Counties 3 Gloucestershire (South) depending on location. Since the discontinuation of Gloucester 3 at the end of the 2017–18 season there is currently no relegation. Up until 2017–18 Gloucester 2 was a single division but has since been split into two regional divisions.

== 2026-27 ==
=== North ===
Departing were Longlevens II and Widden Old Boys promoted to Counties 3 Gloucestershire (North).

| Team | Ground | Capacity | Town/Village | Previous season |
|---|---|---|---|---|
| Cheltenham Civil Service | Tewkesbury Road | | Uckington, Cheltenham, Gloucestershire | 7th |
| Cheltenham II | Newlands Park | 1,000 | Southam, Cheltenham, Gloucestershire | New entry |
| Drybrook II | Mannings Ground | | Drybrook, Gloucestershire | Relegated from Counties 3 Gloucestershire (North) |
| Ledbury II | Ross Road | | Ledbury, Herefordshire | 5th |
| Matson II | Redwell Road | | Matson, Gloucester, Gloucestershire | 6th |
| Minchinhampton | Hollybush Ground | | Minchinhampton, Gloucestershire | 4th |
| Old Cryptians | The Memorial Ground | | Gloucester, Gloucestershire | Relegated from Counties 3 Gloucestershire (North) |
| Old Patesians II | Everest Road | | Cheltenham, Gloucestershire | New entry |
| Ross-on-Wye | Abbotts Close | | Ross-on-Wye, Herefordshire | 8th |
| Smiths II | Prince of Wales Stadium | 3,500 (500 seats) | Cheltenham, Gloucestershire | 3rd |
| Spartans (Gloucester) | Lansdown Road | | Gloucester, Gloucestershire | Re-entry |

Locations of the 2026-27 Counties 4 Gloucestershire (North) teams

=== South ===
Departing were Frampton Cotterell II, Yate and Chipping Sodbury all promoted to Counties 3 Gloucestershire (South).

Also leaving were Bristol Barbarians (11th) on a level transfer to Counties 4 Somerset North.

| Team | Ground | Capacity | Town/Village | Previous season |
|---|---|---|---|---|
| Aretians | Little Stoke Park | | Little Stoke, Bristol | 10th |
| Avonmouth Old Boys II | Barracks Lane | | Shirehampton, Bristol | New entry |
| Bishopston | Bonnington Walk | | Lockleaze, Bristol | 8th |
| Bristol Aeroplane Company | BAWA Sportsground | | Filton, Bristol | 12th |
| Broad Plain | Bristol South End | | Bedminster, Bristol | Re-entry |
| Clifton III | Station Road | 2,500 (400 seats) | Cribbs Causeway, Patchway, Bristol | 4th |
| Cotham Park | Beggar Bush Lane | | Failand, Somerset | Relegated from Counties 3 Gloucestershire (South) (9th) |
| Dings Crusaders III | Shaftsbury Park | 2,250 (250 seats) | Frenchay, Bristol | 9th |
| Old Bristolians II | Memorial Playing Fields | | Failand, Somerset | 5th |
| St Brendan's Old Boys | Coombe Dingle Sports Complex | | Coombe Dingle, Bristol | 6th |
| St Mary's Old Boys II | Trench Lane | | Almondsbury, Bristol | New entry |
| Thornbury II | Cooper's Farm | | Thornbury, Gloucestershire | New entry |

Locations of the 2026-27 Counties 4 Gloucestershire (South) teams
Locations of the 2026-27 Counties 4 Gloucestershire (South) teams in Bristol

== Teams 2025–26 ==
For the new campaign the North / South divisional split was reinstated to allow for the cascading down of teams from Counties 2 Gloucestershire which was consolidated from two divisions to one with a corresponding cascade down from Counties 3 Gloucestershire (North) and Counties 3 Gloucestershire (South).

=== North ===
| Team | Ground | Capacity | Town/Village | Previous season |
|---|---|---|---|---|
| Cheltenham Civil Service | Tewkesbury Road | | Uckington, Cheltenham, Gloucestershire | Re-entry |
| Ledbury II | Ross Road | | Ledbury, Herefordshire | Promoted from Gloucester & District 1 Merit League |
| Longlevens II | Longford Lane | | Longlevens, Gloucestershire | Demoted from Counties 3 Gloucestershire (North) (6th) |
| Matson II | Redwell Road | | Matson, Gloucester, Gloucestershire | Demoted from Counties 3 Gloucestershire (North) (9th) |
| Minchinhampton | Hollybush Ground | | Minchinhampton, Gloucestershire | Demoted from Counties 3 Gloucestershire (North) (7th) |
| Ross-on-Wye | Abbotts Close | | Ross-on-Wye, Herefordshire | 5th |
| Smiths II | Prince of Wales Stadium | 3,500 (500 seats) | Cheltenham, Gloucestershire | 6th |
| Widden Old Boys | The Memorial Ground | | Gloucester, Gloucestershire | Demoted from Counties 3 Gloucestershire (North) (5th) |

Locations of the 2025–26 Counties 4 Gloucestershire (North) teams

=== South ===
| Team | Ground | Capacity | Town/Village | Previous season |
|---|---|---|---|---|
| Aretians | Little Stoke Park | | Little Stoke, Bristol | 8th |
| Bishopston | Bonnington Walk | | Lockleaze, Bristol | 2nd |
| Bristol Aeroplane Company | BAWA Sportsground | | Filton, Bristol | Demoted from Counties 3 Gloucestershire (South) (12th) |
| Bristol Barbarians | Norton Lane | | Whitchurch, Bristol | 7th |
| Cleve II | The Hayfields | | Mangotsfield, Gloucestershire | Promoted from Bristol & District 2 Merit League |
| Clifton III | Station Road | 2,500 (400 seats) | Cribbs Causeway, Patchway, Bristol | Demoted from Counties 3 Gloucestershire (South) (11th) |
| Chipping Sodbury | The Ridings | | Chipping Sodbury, Gloucestershire | Relegated from Counties 2 Gloucestershire (South) (12th) |
| Dings Crusaders III | Shaftsbury Park | 2,250 (250 seats) | Frenchay, Bristol | Demoted from Counties 3 Gloucestershire (South) (9th) |
| Frampton Cotterell II | The Park | | Frampton Cotterell, Gloucestershire | 4th |
| Old Bristolians II | Memorial Playing Fields | | Failand, Somerset | Demoted from Counties 3 Gloucestershire (South) (8th) |
| St Brendan's Old Boys | Coombe Dingle Sports Complex | | Coombe Dingle, Bristol | Demoted from Counties 3 Gloucestershire (South) (10th) |
| Yate | Yate Outdoor Sports Complex | | Yate, Gloucestershire | 3rd |

Locations of the 2025-26 Counties 4 Gloucestershire (South) teams
Locations of the 2025-26 Counties 4 Gloucestershire (South) teams in Bristol

== Teams 2024–25 ==
For the new campaign the North / South divisional split ceased and the remaining teams consolidated into one league.

Departing from the North division were Norton promoted to Counties 3 Gloucestershire (North); Cheltenham II, Cinderford III and Ledbury II returned to their respective merit leagues.

Departing from the South division were Kingswood and Dings Crusaders III promoted to Counties 3 Gloucestershire (South); Barton Hill II (5th) and Whitehall II (7th) returned to their respective merit leagues.

| Team | Ground | Capacity | Town/Village | Previous season |
|---|---|---|---|---|
| Aretians | Little Stoke Park | | Little Stoke, Bristol | Relegated from Counties 3 Gloucestershire (South) |
| Bishopston | Bonnington Walk | | Lockleaze, Bristol | Relegated from Counties 3 Gloucestershire (South) |
| Bristol Barbarians | Norton Lane | | Whitchurch, Bristol | 6th (South) |
| Drybrook II | Mannings Ground | | Drybrook, Gloucestershire | New entry |
| Frampton Cotterell II | The Park | | Frampton Cotterell, Gloucestershire | 3rd (South) |
| Ross-on-Wye | Abbotts Close | | Ross-on-Wye, Herefordshire | Relegated from Counties 3 Gloucestershire (North) |
| Smiths II | Prince of Wales Stadium | 3,500 (500 seats) | Cheltenham, Gloucestershire | New entry |
| Yate | Yate Outdoor Sports Complex | | Yate, Gloucestershire | 4th (South) |

Locations of the 2024–25 Counties 4 Gloucestershire teams

== Teams 2023–24 ==
=== North ===
Departing were Painswick and Longlevens II both promoted to Counties 3 Gloucestershire (North). Greyhound (4th), Newent II (6th) and Old Cryptians II (8th) did not return for the new season.

| Team | Ground | Capacity | Town/Village | Previous season |
|---|---|---|---|---|
| Cheltenham II | Newlands Park | | Southam, Cheltenham, Gloucestershire | 5th |
| Cinderford III | Beavis Memorial Ground | | Cinderford, Gloucestershire | 3rd |
| Ledbury II | Ross Road | | Ledbury, Herefordshire | 7th |
| Norton | Norton Parish Grounds | | Norton, Gloucestershire | Relegated from Counties 3 Gloucestershire (North) |

Locations of the 2023–24 Counties 4 Gloucestershire North teams

=== South ===
Departing were Bristol Aeroplane Company and Clifton III promoted to Counties 3 Gloucestershire (South).

Thornbury II (4th) and Avonmouth Old Boys II (9th) did not return for the new season.

| Team | Ground | Capacity | Town/Village | Previous season |
|---|---|---|---|---|
| Barton Hill II | Duncombe Road | | Speedwell, Bristol | 3rd |
| Bristol Barbarians | Norton Lane | | Whitchurch, Bristol | 5th |
| Dings Crusaders III | Shaftsbury Park | | Frenchay, Bristol | 6th |
| Frampton Cotterell II | The Park | | Frampton Cotterell, Gloucestershire | Relegated from Counties 3 Gloucestershire (South) |
| Kingswood | Grimsbury Road Playing Fields | | Warmley, Kingswood, Gloucestershire | 7th |
| Whitehall II | Foundry Lane | | Whitehall, Bristol | 10th |
| Yate | Yate Outdoor Sports Complex | | Yate, Gloucestershire | 8th |

Locations of the 2022–23 Counties 4 Gloucestershire South teams in Gloucestershire & Somerset
Locations of the 2023–24 Counties 4 Gloucestershire South teams in Bristol

== Teams 2022–23 ==
This was the first season following the RFU Adult Competition Review.

=== North ===
Departing were Tewkesbury, Bredon Star, Stroud, Minchinhampton, Norton (2nd to 6th respectively) were promoted to Counties 3 Gloucestershire (North). Cheltenham Civil Service (champions) and Old Patesians II (8th) did not return for the new season.

| Team | Ground | Capacity | Town/Village | Previous season |
|---|---|---|---|---|
| Cheltenham II | Newlands Park | | Southam, Cheltenham, Gloucestershire | 9th |
| Cinderford III | Beavis Memorial Ground | | Cinderford, Gloucestershire | New entry |
| Greyhound | Hereford Sports Club | | Hereford, Herefordshire | New entry |
| Ledbury II | Ross Road | | Ledbury, Herefordshire | New entry |
| Longlevens II | Longford Lane | | Longlevens, Gloucestershire | New entry |
| Newent II | Recreation Ground | | Newent, Gloucestershire | 11th |
| Old Cryptians II | The Memorial Ground | | Gloucester, Gloucestershire | 7th |
| Painswick | Broadham Fields | | Painswick, Gloucestershire | 10th |

Locations of the 2022–23 Counties 4 Gloucestershire North teams

=== South ===
Departing were Old Colstonians, North Bristol, Cotham Park, Southmead, Broad Plain, Old Bristolians II, Bishopston and Frampton Cotterell II (1st-8th respectively), all promoted to Counties 3 Gloucestershire (South). Cleve II (11th) did not return for the new season.

Yate re-entered league rugby having last competed in Somerset 3 North in 2017–18.

| Team | Ground | Capacity | Town/Village | Previous season |
|---|---|---|---|---|
| Avonmouth Old Boys II | Barracks Lane | | Shirehampton, Bristol | Relegated from Gloucester 1 (South) (11th) |
| Barton Hill II | Duncombe Road | | Speedwell, Bristol | Relegated from Gloucester 1 (South) (12th) |
| Bristol Aeroplane Company | BAWA Sportsground | | Filton, Bristol | 9th |
| Bristol Barbarians | Norton Lane | | Whitchurch, Bristol | Level transfer from Somerset 2 North (5th) |
| Clifton III | Station Road | 2,500 (400 seats) | Cribbs Causeway, Patchway, Bristol | New entry |
| Dings Crusaders III | Shaftsbury Park | 2,250 (250 seats) | Frenchay, Bristol | New entry |
| Kingswood | Grimsbury Road Playing Fields | | Warmley, Kingswood, Gloucestershire | 12th |
| Thornbury II | Cooper's Farm | | Thornbury, Gloucestershire | Relegated from Gloucester 1 (South) (10th) |
| Whitehall II | Foundry Lane | | Whitehall, Bristol | 10th |
| Yate | Yate Outdoor Sports Complex | | Yate | Re-entry |

Locations of the 2022–23 Counties 4 Gloucestershire South teams in Gloucestershire & Somerset
Locations of the 2022–23 Counties 4 Gloucestershire South teams in Bristol

== Teams 2021–22 ==
Ahead of the new season Stroud RFC, promoted to South West 1 West as champions of Western Counties North in 2019–20, withdrew from SW1W and instead joined at the bottom of the regional RFU pyramid in Gloucester 2.

=== North ===
| Team | Ground | Capacity | Town/Village | Previous season |
|---|---|---|---|---|
| Bredon Star | Bredon Playing Fields | | Bredon, Worcestershire | 6th |
| Cheltenham II | Newlands Park | | Southam, Cheltenham, Gloucestershire | New entry |
| Cheltenham Civil Service | Tewkesbury Road | | Uckington, Cheltenham, Gloucestershire | 3rd |
| Minchinhampton | Hollybush Ground | | Minchinhampton, Gloucestershire | 5th |
| Newent II | Recreation Ground | | Newent, Gloucestershire | New entry |
| Norton | Norton Parish Grounds | | Norton, Gloucestershire | 7th |
| Old Cryptians II | The Memorial Ground | | Gloucester, Gloucestershire | New entry |
| Old Patesians II | Everest Road | | Cheltenham, Gloucestershire | New entry |
| Painswick | Broadham Fields | | Painswick, Gloucestershire | 4th |
| Stroud | Fromehall Park | 4,000 (200 seats) | Stroud, Gloucestershire | New entry |
| Tewkesbury | The Moats | | Tewkesbury, Gloucestershire | Relegated from Gloucester 1 (11th) |

Locations of the 2021–22 Gloucester 2 North teams

=== South ===
| Team | Ground | Capacity | Town/Village | Previous season |
|---|---|---|---|---|
| Bishopston | Bonnington Walk | | Lockleaze, Bristol | 4th |
| Bristol Aeroplane Company | BAWA Sportsground | | Filton, Bristol | 5th |
| Broad Plain | Bristol South End | | Bedminster, Bristol | 7th |
| Cleve II | The Hayfields | | Mangotsfield, Gloucestershire | |
| Cotham Park | Beggar Bush Lane | | Failand, Somerset | 8th |
| Frampton Cotterell II | The Park | | Frampton Cotterell, Gloucestershire | New entry |
| Kingswood | Grimsbury Road Playing Fields | | Warmley, Kingswood, Gloucestershire | 9th |
| North Bristol | Oaklands | | Almondsbury, Bristol | Relegated from Gloucester 1 (11th) |
| Old Bristolians II | Memorial Playing Fields | | Failand, Somerset | New entry |
| Old Colstonians | Colton's School | | Stapleton, Bristol | Relegated from Gloucester 1 (12th) |
| Southmead | Greenway Centre | | Southmead, Bristol | 6th |
| Whitehall II | Foundry Lane | | Whitehall, Bristol | New entry |

Locations of the 2021–22 Gloucester 2 South teams outside Bristol
Locations of the 2021–22 Gloucester 2 South teams in Bristol

== 2020–21 ==
Due to the COVID-19 pandemic, the 2020–21 season was cancelled.

== Teams 2019–20 ==
=== North ===
| Team | Ground | Capacity | Town/Village | Previous season |
|---|---|---|---|---|
| Bream | High Street | | Bream, Lydney, Gloucestershire | Level transfer from Gloucester 2 South (3rd) |
| Bredon Star | Bredon Playing Fields | | Bredon, Worcestershire | Relegated from Gloucester 1 (11th) |
| Brockworth | Mill Lane | | Brockworth, Gloucestershire | Relegated from Gloucester 1 (10th) |
| Cainscross | Victory Park | | Cainscross, Stroud, Gloucestershire | 8th |
| Cheltenham Civil Service | Tewkesbury Road | | Uckington, Cheltenham, Gloucestershire | 3rd |
| Minchinhampton | Hollybush Ground | | Minchinhampton, Gloucestershire | 5th |
| Norton | Norton Parish Grounds | | Norton, Gloucestershire | 7th |
| Painswick | Broadham Fields | | Painswick, Gloucestershire | 4th |
| Westbury-on-Severn | Parish Playing Field | | Westbury-on-Severn, Gloucestershire | 6th |

Locations of the 2019–20 Gloucester 2 North teams

=== South ===
| Team | Ground | Capacity | Town/Village | Previous season |
|---|---|---|---|---|
| Aretians | Little Stoke Park | | Little Stoke, Bristol | 7th |
| Ashley Down Old Boys | Lockleaze Combination Ground | | Lockleaze, Bristol | Runners up (Note: Ashley Down Old Boys went to playoffs on league technicality.) |
| Bishopston | Bonnington Walk | | Lockleaze, Bristol | 4th |
| Bristol Aeroplane Company | BAWA Sportsground | | Filton, Bristol | 6th |
| Broad Plain | Bristol South End | | Bedminster, Bristol | 9th |
| Cotham Park | Beggar Bush Lane | | Failand, Somerset | 8th |
| Kingswood | Grimsbury Road Playing Fields | | Warmley, Kingswood, Gloucestershire | 10th |
| Southmead | Greenway Centre | | Southmead, Bristol | Relegated from Gloucester 1 (12th) |
| United Bristol Hospitals | Portway Development Ground | | Portway, Bristol | 5th |

Locations of the 2019–20 Gloucester 2 South teams outside Bristol
Locations of the 2019–20 Gloucester 2 South teams in Bristol

== Teams 2018–19 ==
=== North ===
| Team | Ground | Capacity | Town/Village | Previous season |
|---|---|---|---|---|
| Cainscross | Victory Park | | Cainscross, Stroud, Gloucestershire | Promoted from Gloucester 3 (6th) |
| Cheltenham Civil Service | Tewkesbury Road | | Uckington, Cheltenham, Gloucestershire | 12th |
| Fairford | Coln House School Playing Grounds | | Fairford, Gloucestershire | Promoted from Gloucester 3 (4th) |
| Minchinhampton | Hollybush Ground | | Minchinhampton, Gloucestershire | 6th |
| Norton | Norton Parish Grounds | | Norton, Gloucestershire | Promoted from Gloucester 3 (runners up) |
| Painswick | Broadham Fields | | Painswick, Gloucestershire | Promoted from Gloucester 3 (3rd) |
| Tewkesbury | The Moats | | Tewkesbury, Gloucestershire | 8th |
| Westbury-on-Severn | Parish Playing Field | | Westbury-on-Severn, Gloucestershire | Promoted from Gloucester 3 (5th) |

Locations of the 2018–19 Gloucester 2 North teams

=== South ===
| Team | Ground | Capacity | Town/Village | Previous season |
|---|---|---|---|---|
| Aretians | Little Stoke Park | | Little Stoke, Bristol | 11th |
| Ashley Down Old Boys | Lockleaze Combination Ground | | Lockleaze, Bristol | 5th |
| Bishopston | Bonnington Walk | | Lockleaze, Bristol | 10th |
| Bream | High Street | | Bream, Lydney, Gloucestershire | 4th |
| Bristol Aeroplane Company | BAWA Sportsground | | Filton, Bristol | 3rd |
| Broad Plain | Bristol South End | | Southmead, Bristol | 7th |
| Cotham Park | Beggar Bush Lane | | Failand, Somerset | 9th |
| Kingswood | Grimsbury Road Playing Fields | | Warmley, Kingswood, Gloucestershire | Promoted from Gloucester 3 (7th) |
| St Brendan's Old Boys | Coombe Dingle Sports Complex | | Coombe Dingle, Bristol | Relegated from Gloucester 1 (12th) |
| United Bristol Hospitals | Portway Development Ground | | Portway, Bristol | Promoted from Gloucester 3 (champions) |

Locations of the 2018–19 Gloucester 2 South teams outside Bristol
Locations of the 2018–19 Gloucester 2 South teams in Bristol

== Teams 2017–18 ==
| Team | Ground | Capacity | Town/Village | Previous season |
|---|---|---|---|---|
| Aretians | Little Stoke Park | | Little Stoke, Bristol | Promoted from Gloucester 3 (runners up) |
| Ashley Down Old Boys | Lockleaze Combination Ground | | Lockleaze, Bristol | Relegated from Gloucester 1 (12th) |
| Bishopston | Bonnington Walk | | Lockleaze, Bristol | 6th |
| Bream | High Street | | Bream, Lydney, Gloucestershire | Relegated from Gloucester 1 (11th) |
| Bristol Aeroplane Company | BAWA Sportsground | | Filton, Bristol | 5th |
| Broad Plain | Bristol South End | | Southmead, Bristol | 7th |
| Cheltenham Civil Service | Tewkesbury Road | | Uckington, Cheltenham, Gloucestershire | 8th |
| Cotham Park | Beggar Bush Lane | | Failand, Somerset | Promoted from Gloucester 3 (champions) |
| Minchinhampton | Hollybush Ground | | Minchinhampton, Gloucestershire | 9th |
| Ross-on-Wye | Abbotts Close | | Ross-on-Wye, Herefordshire | 4th |
| Smiths | Prince of Wales Stadium | 3,500 (500 seats) | Cheltenham, Gloucestershire | 3rd |
| Tewkesbury | The Moats | | Tewkesbury, Gloucestershire | Relegated from Gloucester 1 (10th) |

Locations of the 2017–18 Gloucester 2 teams
Locations of the 2017–18 Gloucester 2 South teams in Bristol

== Teams 2016–17 ==
- Bishopston (relegated from Gloucester 1)
- Bristol Airplane Company
- Broad Plain
- Cheltenham Civil Service (promoted from Gloucester 3)
- Kingswood
- Minchinhampton
- Painswick (relegated from Gloucester 1)
- Old Colstians
- Old Elizabethans (promoted from Gloucester 3)
- Ross-on-Wye
- Smiths
- Westbury-on-Severn

== Teams 2015–16 ==
The 2015–16 Gloucester 2 consists of twelve teams; ten from Gloucestershire and Bristol as well as two teams in Herefordshire and Somerset. The season starts on 12 September 2015 and is due to end on 23 April 2016. Eight of the twelve teams participated in last season's competition. The 2014–15 champions St Brendan's Old Boys and runners up Bishopston were promoted to the Gloucester 1 while Old Elizabethans were relegated to Gloucester 3.

| Team | Ground | Capacity | Town/Village | Previous season |
|---|---|---|---|---|
| Aretians | Little Stoke Park | | Little Stoke, Bristol | 5th |
| Ashley Down Old Boys | Lockleaze Combination Ground | | Lockleaze, Bristol | 7th |
| Bristol Aeroplane Company | BAWA Sportsground | | Filton, Bristol | 9th |
| Broad Plain | Bristol South End | | Southmead, Bristol | 10th |
| Cotham Park | Beggar Bush Lane | | Failand, Somerset | 8th |
| Kingswood | Grimsbury Road Playing Fields | | Warmley, Kingswood, Gloucestershire | Relegated from Gloucester 1 (11th) |
| Minchinhampton | Hollybush Ground | | Minchinhampton, Gloucestershire | Promoted from Gloucester 3 (runners up) |
| Old Colstonians | Colton's School | | Stapleton, Bristol | Relegated from Gloucester 1 (12th) |
| Ross-on-Wye | Abbotts Close | | Ross-on-Wye, Herefordshire | 3rd |
| Smiths | Prince of Wales Stadium | 3,500 (500 seats) | Cheltenham, Gloucestershire | Promoted from Gloucester 3 (champions) |
| Spartans | Lansdown Road | | Gloucester, Gloucestershire | 4th |
| Westbury-on-Severn | Parish Playing Field | | Westbury-on-Severn, Gloucestershire | 6th |

Locations of the 2015–16 Gloucester 2 teams
Locations of the 2015–16 Gloucester 2 South teams in Bristol

== Teams 2014–15 ==
- Aretians
- Ashley Down Old Boys (relegated from Gloucester 1)
- Bishopston (relegated from Gloucester 1)
- Bristol Aeroplane Co.
- Broad Plain
- Cotham Park
- Old Elizabethans (promoted from Gloucester 3)
- Ross-on-Wye
- St. Brendan's Old Boys
- Spartans
- Tredworth (promoted from Gloucester 3)
- Westbury-on-Severn

== Teams 2013–14 ==
- Aretians
- Bredon Star
- Bristol Aeroplane Co.
- Broad Plain (relegated from Gloucester 1)
- Cheltenham Civil Service
- Cotham Park
- Old Cryptians (promoted from Gloucester 3)
- Ross-on-Wye
- Spartans
- St. Brendands Old Boys
- Westbury-on-Severn (promoted from Gloucester 3)

== Teams 2012–13 ==
- Aretians
- Ashley Down Old Boys
- Bream
- Bredon Star
- Bristol Aeroplane Co.
- Cainscross
- Cheltenham Civil Service
- Cotham Park
- Gloucester All Blues
- Ross On Wye
- Spartans
- St Brendan's Old Boys

== Teams 2011–12 ==
- Aretians (relegated from Gloucester 1)
- Bristol Aeroplane Co.
- Broad Plain
- Cheltenham Civil Service (relegated from Gloucester 1)
- Chipping Sodbury
- Cotham Park (relegated from Gloucester 1)
- Gloucester All Blues
- Old Cryptians
- Old Elizabethans
- St. Brendon's Old Boys
- Tetbury (withdrawn)
- Westbury-on-Severn

== Teams 2010–11 ==
- Bristol Aeroplane Co.
- Cheltenham Saracens RFC
- Chipping Sodbury
- Greyhound RFC
- Old Cryptians
- Old Elizabethans
- Newent (promoted from Gloucester 3)
- St. Brendon's Old Boys
- Smiths
- Tetbury
- Tredworth
- Westbury-on-Severn

== Teams 2009–10 ==
- Bristol Aeroplane Co.
- Cainscross
- Cheltenham Saracens RFC
- Cotham Park
- Greyhound
- Kingswood
- Old Elizabethans
- St. Brendan's Old Boys
- Tetbury
- Tredworth
- Westbury-on-Severn

== Teams 2008–09 ==
- Bream
- Bristol Aeroplane Co.
- Cainscross
- Cheltenham Saracens RFC
- Greyhound
- Kingswood
- Old Cryptians
- Old Elizabethans
- Tetbury
- Tredworth
- Westbury-on-Severn

== Teams 2007–08 ==
- Ashley Down Old Boys
- Bristol Aeroplane Co.
- Cainscross
- Cheltenham Civil Service
- Cheltenham Saracens RFC
- Kingswood
- Old Cryptians
- Old Elizabethans
- Smiths
- Tetbury
- Westbury-on-Severn

== Teams 2006–07 ==
- Ashley Down Old Boys
- Bristol Aeroplane Co.
- Cheltenham Saracens RFC
- Cotham Park
- Dursley
- Ross-on-Wye
- Kingswood
- Old Elizabethans
- Tetbury
- Tredworth
- Westbury-on-Severn

== Teams 2005–06 ==
- Ashley Down Old Boys
- Bristol Aeroplane Co.
- Brockworth
- Cheltenham Saracens RFC
- Dursley
- Hartpury College
- Hucclecote
- Old Cryptians
- Old Elizabethans
- Smiths

== Teams 2004–05 ==
- Bream
- Brockworth
- Cheltenham Civil Service
- Cheltenham Saracens RFC
- Cotham Park
- Dursley
- Gloucester Civil Service
- Hucclecote
- Kingswood
- Old Elizabethans

== Teams 2003–04 ==
- Bream
- Cheltenham Civil Service
- Dursley
- Minchinhampton
- Old Colstonians
- Old Cryptians
- Old Elizabethans
- Smiths
- Westbury-on-Severn

== Teams 2002–03 ==
- Cheltenham Saracens RFC
- Kingswood
- Minchinhampton
- Old Cryptians
- Old Elizabethans
- Ross-on-Wye
- Smiths
- Westbury-on-Severn
- Widden Old Boys

== Teams 2001–02 ==
- Bishopston
- Bristol Aeroplane Co.
- Cainscross
- Dursley
- Kingswood
- Old Elizabethans
- Painswick
- Smiths
- Southmead
- Tewkesbury

== Original teams ==
When league rugby began in 1987 this division (then a single division known as Gloucestershire 2) contained the following teams:

- Ashley Down Old Boys
- Barton Hill
- Brockworth
- Caincross
- Cheltenham Civil Service
- Cheltenham Saracens
- Cotham Park
- Dursley
- North Bristol
- Old Cryptians
- Saintbridge Former Pupils (Note: Saintbridge Former Pupils would be renamed as Old Centralians.)

== Gloucester 2 honours ==
=== Gloucestershire 2 (1987–1991) ===
Originally as single division known as Gloucestershire 2, it was a tier 10 league with promotion to Gloucestershire 1 and relegation to Gloucestershire 3.

Gloucestershire 2
| Season | No of teams | Champions | Runners–up | Relegated Teams | Ref |
| 1987–88 | 11 | North Bristol | Saintbridge Former Pupils | Caincross, Dursley | |
| 1988–89 | 11 | Gloucester Old Boys | Cheltenham North | Cheltenham Civil Service | |
| 1989–90 | 11 | Brockworth | Ashley Down Old Boys | Old Bristolians | |
| 1990–91 | 11 | Thornbury | Frampton Cotterell | Old Colstonians | |
Green backgrounds are promotion places.

=== Gloucester 2 (1991–1993) ===
Gloucestershire 2 was shorted to Gloucester 2 for the 1991–92 season onward. It remained a tier 10 league with promotion to Gloucester 1 and relegation to Gloucester 3.

Gloucester 2
| Season | No of teams | Champions | Runners–up | Relegated Teams | Ref |
| 1991–92 | 11 | Ashley Down Old Boys | Bristol Saracens (Note: Due to the reorganisation of the majority of South West leagues from 11 to 13 teams, 3rd and 4th place Old Richians were Old Cryptians were also promoted.) | No relegation (Note: The restructuring of Gloucester 2 from 11 to 13 teams meant that there was no relegation.) | |
| 1992–93 | 13 | Stow-on-the-Wold | Painswick | Cainscross | |
Green backgrounds are promotion places.

=== Gloucester 2 (1993–1996) ===
The creation of National League 5 South for the 1993–94 season meant that Gloucester 2 dropped to become a tier 11 league. Promotion continued to Gloucester 1 and relegation to Gloucester 3.

Gloucester 2
| Season | No of teams | Champions | Runners–up | Relegated Teams | Ref |
| 1993–94 | 13 | Hucclecote Old Boys | Barton Hill | Dursley, Chipping Sodbury | |
| 1994–95 | 13 | Tredworth | Bristol Saracens | Kingswood | |
| 1995–96 | 13 | Old Centralians | Cheltenham Saracens (Note: The cancellation of National League 5 South at the end of the season, meant that nine teams were promoted into Gloucester 1 including Cainscross, Cheltenham Civil Service, Bristol Telephone Area, Bishopston, Old Bristolians, Painswick and Ashley Down Old Boys.) | No relegation | |
Green backgrounds are promotion places.

=== Gloucester 2 (1996–2000) ===
The cancellation of National League 5 South at the end of the 1995–96 season meant that Gloucester 2 reverted to being a tier 10 league. Promotion continued to Gloucester 1 and relegation to Gloucester 3.

Gloucester 2
| Season | No of teams | Champions | Runners–up | Relegated Teams | Ref |
| 1996–97 | 13 | Southmead | Chosen Hill Former Pupils | St. Brendan's Old Boys, Gloucester Civil Service | |
| 1997–98 | 13 | Chipping Sodbury | Aretians | Old Colstonians | |
| 1998–99 | 12 | Westbury-on-Severn | Tetbury | No relegation | |
| 1999–00 | 12 | Tewkesbury | Bishopston | Multiple teams (Note: Old Colstonians, Gloucester All Blues, Cotham Park, Gloucester Civil Service and Minchinhampton would be the relegated teams this year. The reason for so many relegations was partly due to Gloucester 2 reducing in size from 12 to 10 teams but also due to the introduction of Gloucester 3 South for the 2000-01 season leading to a restructuring of the Gloucestershire regional divisions.) | |
Green backgrounds are promotion places.

=== Gloucester 2 (2000–2009) ===
Gloucester 2 remained a tier 10 league despite the cancellation of Gloucestershire/Somerset at the end of the 1999–00 season. Promotion continued to Gloucester 1 and relegation to Gloucester 3. Between 2007 and 2009 Gloucester 2 was sponsored by High Bridge Jewellers.

Gloucester 2
| Season | No of teams | Champions | Runners–up | Relegated Teams | Ref |
| 2000–01 | 10 | Painswick | Tewkesbury | Cainscross, Bristol Telephone Area, Smiths | |
| 2001–02 | 9 | Bishopston | Southmead | Dursley, Old Colstonians, Cheltenham Civil Service | |
| 2002–03 | 9 | Cheltenham Saracens | Widden Old Boys | Ross-on-Wye, Kingswood | |
| 2003–04 | 9 | Old Colstonians | Old Cryptians | Minchinhampton, Smiths, Westbury-on-Severn | |
| 2004–05 | 10 | Bream | Cheltenham Civil Service | Gloucester Civil Service, Kingswood, Cotham Park | |
| 2005–06 | 10 | Hartpury College | Hucclecote | Smiths | |
| 2006–07 | 11 | Dursley | Ross-on-Wye | Tredworth, Cotham Park | |
| 2007–08 | 11 | Cheltenham Civil Service | Ashley Down Old Boys | Smiths | |
| 2008–09 | 11 | Bream | Old Cryptians | No relegation | |
Green backgrounds are promotion places.

=== Gloucester 2 (2009–2017) ===
Despite widespread restructuring by the RFU at the end of the 2008–09 season, Gloucester 2 remained a tier 10 league, with promotion continuing to Gloucester 1 and relegation to Gloucester 3.

Gloucester 2
| Season | No of teams | Champions | Runners–up | Relegated Teams | Ref |
| 2009–10 | 11 | Kingswood | Cotham Park | Cainscross | |
| 2010–11 | 12 | Cheltenham Saracens | Newent | Tredworth, Smiths, Greyhound, Tetbury | |
| 2011–12 | 11 | Chipping Sodbury | Broad Plain | Old Elizabethans, Westbury-on-Severn, Old Cryptians | |
| 2012–13 | 12 | Bream | Ashley Down Old Boys | Cainscross | |
| 2013–14 | 11 | Old Cryptians | Bredon Star | Cheltenham Civil Service | |
| 2014–15 | 11 | St. Brendan's Old Boys | Bishopston | Old Elizabethans | |
| 2015–16 | 12 | Spartans | Ashley Down Old Boys | Aretians, Cotham Park | |
| 2016–17 | 12 | Old Colstonians | Old Elizabethans | Kingswood, Painswick, Westbury-on-Severn | |
| 2017–18 | 12 | Ross-on-Wye | Smiths | No relegation (Note: The dissolution of Gloucester 3 at the end of the 2017–18 season and the splitting of Gloucester 2 into north and south regions for the 2018–19 season meant there were no relegation.) | |
Green backgrounds are promotion places.

=== Gloucester 2 North / South (2018–present) ===
For the 2018–19 season Gloucester 2 was split into two regional tier 10 leagues - Gloucester 2 North and Gloucester 2 South. Promotion continued to Gloucester 1 and there was no longer any relegation due to the cancellation of Gloucester 3. The league was now sponsored by Wadworth 6x.

Gloucester 2 North / South
| Season | No of teams | Champions | Runners–up | Relegated Teams | League Name | Ref |
| 2018–19 | 8 | Tewkesbury | Fairford | No relegation | Gloucester 2 North | |
| 2018–19 | 10 | St Brendan's Old Boys | Ashley Down Old Boys | No relegation | Gloucester 2 South | |
| 2019–20 | 9 | Brockworth | Bream | No relegation | Gloucester 2 North | |
| 2019–20 | 9 | Ashley Down Old Boys | Aretians | No relegation | Gloucester 2 South | |
| 2020–21 | 9 | | | No relegation | Gloucester 2 North | |
| 2020–21 | 9 | | | No relegation | Gloucester 2 South | |
Green backgrounds are promotion places.

== Promotion play-offs ==
Since the 2018–19 season there has been a play-off between the runners-up of the Gloucester 2 North and Gloucester 2 South for the third and final promotion place to Gloucester 1. The team with the superior league record has home advantage in the tie. At the end of the 2019–20 season Gloucester 2 North teams have been the most successful with one wins to the Gloucester 2 South teams zero; and the home team has won promotion on one occasions compared to the away teams zero.

Gloucester Premier v Tribute Somerset Premier promotion play-off results
| Season | Home team | Score | Away team | Venue | Attendance |
| 2018–19 | Fairford (N) | 11-10 | Bream (S) | Coln House School Playing Grounds, Fairford, Gloucestershire | |
| 2019–20 | Cancelled due to COVID-19 pandemic in the United Kingdom. No promotion. | | | | |
| 2020–21 | | | | | |
Green background is the promoted team. N = Gloucester 2 North and S = Gloucester 2 South

== Number of league titles ==
- Bream (3)
- Ashley Down Old Boys (2) (Note: Ashley Down Old Boys title wins includes the Gloucester 2 South title.)
- Brockworth (2) (Note: One of Brockworth's title wins includes the Gloucester 2 North title.)
- Cheltenham Saracens (2)
- Chipping Sodbury (2)
- Old Colstonians (2)
- St. Brendan's Old Boys (2) (Note: One of St. Brendan's Old Boys title wins includes the Gloucester 2 South title.)
- Tewkesbury (2) (Note: One of Tewkesbury's wins includes the Gloucester 2 North title.)
- Bishopston (1)
- Cheltenham Civil Service (1)
- Dursley (1)
- Gloucester Old Boys (1)
- Hartpury College (1)
- Hucclecote Old Boys (1) (Note: Hucclecote Old Boys are currently known as Hucclecote RFC.)
- Kingswood (1)
- North Bristol (1)
- Old Centralians (1)
- Old Cryptians (1)
- Ross-on-Wye (1)
- Southmead (1)
- Spartans (1)
- Stow-on-the-Wold (1)
- Thornbury (1)
- Tredworth (1)
- Westbury-on-Severn (1)

== See also ==
- South West Division RFU
- Gloucestershire RFU
- English rugby union system
- Rugby union in England
