= Gloucester 3 =

English rugby union league

- Current season or competition: 2017–18 Gloucester 3
- Sport: Rugby union
- Instituted: 1987; 39 years ago (as Gloucestershire 3)
- Ceased: 2018; 8 years ago
- Number of teams: 9
- Country: England
- Holders: United Bristol Hospitals (1st title) (2017–18 promoted to Gloucester 2)
- Most titles: St Brendan's Old Boys (3 titles)
- Website: englandrugby.com

Gloucester 3 was an English rugby union league which sat at the eleventh level of league rugby union in England for teams based in Gloucestershire as well as some in Bristol. Promoted clubs moved into Gloucester 2, and since the cancellation of Gloucester 4 at the end of the 1995–96 season there had been no relegation. The division was discontinued at the end of the 2017–18 season and Gloucester 2 was divided into north and south regional divisions.

== Teams 2017–18 ==
Team	Ground	Capacity	Town/Village	Previous season
Cainscross	Victory Park		Cainscross, Stroud, Gloucestershire	6th
Fairford	Walnut Tree Field		Fairford, Gloucestershire	4th
Gloucester All Blues	The Oxleaze		Gloucester, Gloucestershire	7th
Kingswood	Grimsbury Road Playing Fields		Warmley, Kingswood, Gloucestershire	Relegated from Gloucester 2 (12th)
Norton	Norton Parish Grounds		Norton, Gloucestershire	5th
Painswick	Broadham Fields		Painswick, Gloucestershire	Relegated from Gloucester 2 (11th)
Tetbury	The Recreation Ground		Tetbury, Gloucestershire	3rd
United Bristol Hospitals	Portway Development Ground		Portway, Bristol	Transferred from Gloucestershire Reserve Leagues
Westbury-on-Severn	Parish Playing Field		Westbury-on-Severn, Gloucestershire	Relegated from Gloucester 2 (10th)

Locations of the 2017-18 Gloucester 3 teams

== Teams 2016-17 ==
- Aretians (relegated from Gloucester 2)
- Cainscross
- Cotham Park
- Fairford
- Gloucester All Blues
- Norton
- Tetbury
- Wotton

== 2015–16 ==
The 2015–16 Gloucester 3 consists of seven teams from Gloucestershire. The season starts on 12 September 2015 and is due to end on 16 April 2016. Four of the seven teams participated in last season's competition. The 2014–15 champions Smiths and runners up Minchinhampton were promoted to the Gloucester 2 while Wotton joined from the Gloucestershire Reserve League. As it is the basement league in Gloucestershire there is no relegation.

Team	Ground	Capacity	Town/Village	Previous season
Cainscross	Victory Park		Cainscross, Stroud, Gloucestershire	3rd
Cheltenham Civil Service	Tewkesbury Road		Uckington, Cheltenham, Gloucestershire	5th
Gloucester All Blues	The Oxleaze		Gloucester, Gloucestershire	4th
Norton	Norton Parish Grounds		Norton, Gloucestershire	7th
Old Elizabethans	Severn Road		Hallen, Gloucestershire	Relegated from Gloucester 2 (11th)
Tetbury	The Recreation Ground		Tetbury, Gloucestershire	6th
Wotton	KLB School Playing Fields		Wotton-Under-Edge, Gloucestershire	Joined from Gloucestershire Reserve League - South 2 (1st)

Locations of the 2015-16 Gloucester 3 teams

== Teams 2014-15 ==
- Cainscross
- Cheltenham Civil Service (relegated from Gloucester 2)
- Gloucester All Blues (relegated from Gloucester 2)
- Hardwicke & Quedgeley Harlequins
- Minchinhampton
- Norton
- Smiths
- Tetbury

== Teams 2013–14 ==
- Cainscross (relegated from Gloucester 2)
- Hardwicke & Quedgeley
- Minchinhampton
- Norton
- Old Elizabethans
- Smiths
- Tredworth

== Teams 2012–13 ==
- Gloucester Civil Service
- Minchinhampton
- Norton
- Old Cryptians (relegated from Gloucester 2)
- Old Elizabethans (relegated from Gloucester 2)
- Smiths
- Tredworth
- Westbury-on-Severn

== Teams 2011-12 ==
- Bredon Star
- Bristol Telephone Area
- Cainscross
- Gloucester Civil Service
- Greyhound RFC (relegated from Gloucester 2)
- Minchinhampton
- Smiths (relegated from Gloucester 2)

== Teams 2010-11 ==
- Bristol Telephone Area
- Broad Plain
- Cainscross (relegated from Gloucester 2)
- Gloucester All Blues
- Gloucester Civil Service
- Minchinhampton
- Wotton

== Teams 2009-10 ==
- Bristol Telephone Area
- Dowty
- Gloucester All Blues
- Gloucester Civil Service
- Minchinhampton
- Newent
- Smiths
- Wotton

== Teams 2008-09 ==
- Bristol Telephone Area
- Cotham Park
- Gloucester All Blues
- Gloucester Civil Service
- Minchinhampton
- Newent
- St. Brendan's Old Boys
- Smiths
- Wotton

== Teams 2007-08 ==
- Bristol Telephone Area
- Cotham Park (relegated from Gloucester 2)
- Gloucester All Blues
- Gloucester Civil Service
- Greyhound
- Minchinhampton
- Pilning
- St. Brendon's Old Boys
- Tredworth
- Wotton

== Teams 2006-07 ==
- Bristol Telephone Area
- Cainscross
- Gloucester All Blues
- Gloucester Civil Service
- Greyhound
- Minchinhampton
- Pilning
- St. Brendan's Old Boys
- Smiths (relegated from Gloucester 2)
- Wotton

== Teams 2005-06 ==
=== North ===
- Cainscross
- Gloucester All Blues
- Gloucester Civil Service
- Minchinhampton
- Ross-on-Wye
- Tredworth
- Westbury-on-Severn

=== South ===
- Bristol Aeroplane Co.
- Cotham Park
- Kingswood
- Pilning
- St. Brendan's Old Boys
- Tetbury
- Wotton

== Teams 2004-05 ==
=== North ===
- Fairford
- Gloucester All Blues
- Hartpury College
- Ross-on-Wye
- Smiths
- Tredworth
- Westbury-on-Severn

=== South ===
- Bristol Aeroplane Co.
- Bristol Telephone Area
- Cainscross
- Minchinhampton
- Pilning
- St. Brendan's Old Boys
- Tetbury
- Wotton

== Teams 2003-04 ==
=== North ===
- Cainscross
- Fairford
- Gloucester All Blues
- Gloucester Civil Service
- Ross-on-Wye
- Tredworth
- Newent

=== South ===
- Bristol Aeroplane Co.
- Bristol Telephone Area
- Cotham Park
- Kingswood
- Pilning
- St. Brendan's Old Boys
- Tetbury
- Wotton

== Teams 2002-03 ==
=== North ===
- Cainscross
- Cheltenham Civil Service
- Dursley
- Fairford
- Gloucester All Blues
- Gloucester Civil Service
- Newent
- Tredworth

=== South ===
- Bristol Aeroplane Co.
- Bristol Telephone Area
- Cotham Park
- Old Colstonians
- Pilning
- St. Brendand's Old Boys
- Tetbury
- Wotton

== Teams 2001-02 ==
=== North ===
- Fairford
- Gloucester All Blues
- Gloucester Civil Service
- Newent
- Smiths
- Ross-on-Wye
- Tredworth

=== South ===
- Bristol Aeroplane Co.
- Bristol Telephone Area
- Cainscross
- Cotham Park
- Minchinhampton
- Tetbury
- Wotton

== Teams 2000-01 ==
=== North ===
- Fairford
- Gloucester All Blues
- Gloucester Civil Service
- Newent
- Ross-on-Wye
- Tredworth
- Widden Old Boys

=== South ===
- Bristol Aeroplane Co.
- Cotham Park
- Minchinhampton
- Old Colstonians
- St. Brendan's Old Boys
- Wotton

== Original teams ==
When league rugby began in 1987 this division (then a single division known as Gloucestershire 3) contained the following teams:

- Bishopston
- Chipping Sodbury
- Chosen Hill Former Pupils
- Frampton Cotterell
- Gloucester Civil Service
- Gloucester Old Boys
- Kingswood
- Old Bristolians
- Painswick
- Tewkesbury
- Thornbury

== Gloucester 3 honours ==
=== Gloucestershire 3 (1987–1991) ===
Originally a single division known as Gloucestershire 3, it was a tier 11 league with promotion to Gloucestershire 2 and relegation to Gloucestershire 4. (Note: Gloucestershire 4 was briefly divided into Gloucestershire 4A or Gloucestershire 4B for the 1989–90 season before remerging back into a single division.)

Gloucestershire 3
Season	No of teams	Champions	Runners–up	Relegated Teams	Ref
1987–88	11	Old Bristolians	Gloucester Old Boys	Bishopton, Gloucester Civil Service	
1988–89	11	Frampton Cotterell	Thornbury	Chosen Hill Former Pupils	
1989–90	11	Hucclecote Old Boys	Chipping Sodbury	No relegation (Note: There was no relegation at the end of the 1989–90 season due to Gloucestershire 4 remerging back into a single division and Gloucestershire 3 increasing from 11 to 13 teams.)	
1990–91	13	Bristol Telephone Area	Old Richians	Smiths	
Green backgrounds are promotion places.

=== Gloucester 3 (1991–1993) ===
Gloucestershire 3 was shorted to Gloucester 3 for the 1991–92 season onward. It remained a tier 11 league with promotion to Gloucester 2 and relegation to Gloucester 4.

Gloucester 3
Season	No of teams	Champions	Runners–up	Relegated Teams	Ref
1991–92	13	Painswick	Stow-on-the-Wold (Note: The restructuring of the majority of south west leagues from 11 to 13 teams meant that six teams were promoted including Cheltenham Civil Service, Old Bristolians, Chosen Hill Former Pupils and Caincross.)	No relegation (Note: The restructuring of south west leagues meant that there was no relegation.)	
1992–93	13	Dursley	Tetbury	Tewkesbury	
Green backgrounds are promotion places.

=== Gloucester 3 (1993–1996) ===
The creation of National League 5 South for the 1993–94 season meant that Gloucester 3 dropped to become a tier 12 league. Promotion continued to Gloucester 2 and relegation to Gloucester 4.

Gloucester 3
Season	No of teams	Champions	Runners–up	Relegated Teams	Ref
1993–94	13	Bishopston	Kingswood	Gloucester All Blues, Bristol Aeroplane Company	
1994–95	13	Caincross	Broad Plain	Minchinhampton	
1995–96	13	Southmead	Westbury-on-Severn (Note: Restructuring of the leagues following the cancellation of National League 5 South and Gloucester 4 at the end of the season meant that nine clubs would be promoted including Kingswood, Smiths, Aretians, Gloucester Civil Service, Old Colstonians, Chipping Sodbury and Tewkesbury.)	No relegation (Note: The cancellation of Gloucester 4 at the end of the season meant there would be no relegation.)	
Green backgrounds are promotion places.

=== Gloucester 3 (1996–2000) ===
The cancellation of National League 5 South at the end of the 1995–96 season meant that Gloucester 3 reverted to being a tier 11 league. Promotion continued to Gloucester 1 while the cancellation of Gloucester 4 meant there was no longer relegation.

Gloucester 3
Season	No of teams	Champions	Runners–up	Relegated Teams	Ref
1996–97	9	Dursley	Old Elizabethans	No relegation	
1997–98	9	Gloucester All Blues	Minchinhampton	No relegation	
1998–99	8	Gloucester Civil Service	Old Colstonians	No relegation	
1999–00	6	St Brendan's Old Boys	Wotton	No relegation	
Green backgrounds are promotion places.

=== Gloucester 3 North / South (2000–2006) ===
Restructuring of the Gloucester leagues at the end of the 1999–00 season saw Gloucester 3 split into two regional leagues - Gloucester 3 North and Gloucester 3 South - both at tier 11 of the league system. Promotion continued to Gloucester 2 and there was no relegation.

Gloucester 3
Season	No of teams	Champions	Runners–up	Relegated Teams	League Name	Ref
2000–01	7	Widden Old Boys	Ross-on-Wye	No relegation	Gloucester 3 North	
2000–01	6	St Brendan's Old Boys	Old Colstonians	No relegation	Gloucester 3 South	
2001–02	7	Ross-on-Wye	Smiths	No relegation	Gloucester 3 North	
2001–02	7	Minchinhampton	Cainscross	No relegation	Gloucester 3 South	
2002–03	8	Cheltenham Civil Service	Dursley	No relegation	Gloucester 3 North	
2002–03	8	Old Colstonians	Bristol Aeroplane Co.	No relegation	Gloucester 3 South	
2003–04	7	Gloucester Civil Service	Cainscross	No relegation	Gloucester 3 North	
2003–04	8	Kingswood	Cotham Park	No relegation	Gloucester 3 South	
2004–05	7	Hartpury College	Smiths	No relegation	Gloucester 3 North	
2004–05	8	Bristol Aeroplane Co.	Tetbury	No relegation	Gloucester 3 South	
2005–06	7	Ross-on-Wye	Westbury-on-Severn	No relegation	Gloucester 3 North (Note: This would be the last season for Gloucester 3 North. For 2006-07 the division would merge with Gloucester 3 South to form a new division - Gloucester 3.)	
2005–06	7	Tetbury	Kingswood	No relegation	Gloucester 3 South (Note: This would be the last season for Gloucester 3 South. For 2006-07 the division would merge with Gloucester 3 North to form a new division - Gloucester 3.)	
Green backgrounds are promotion places.

=== Gloucester 3 (2006–2009) ===
For the 2006–07 season Gloucester 3 North and South were remerged back into a single Gloucester 3 division, remaining at tier 11 of the league system. Promotion continued to Gloucester 2 and there was no relegation. Between 2007 and 2009 Gloucester 3 was sponsored by High Bridge Jewellers.

Gloucester 3
Season	No of teams	Champions	Runners–up	Relegated Teams	Ref
2006–07	10	Smiths	Cainscross	No relegation	
2007–08	10	Tredworth	Greyhound	No relegation	
2008–09	9	St Brendan's Old Boys	Cotham Park	No relegation	
Green backgrounds are promotion places.

=== Gloucester 3 (2009–2018) ===
Despite widespread restructuring by the RFU at the end of the 2008–09 season, Gloucester 2 remained a tier 11 league, with promotion continuing to Gloucester 1 and there was no relegation. From 2017 the league was now sponsored by Wadworth 6x. At the end of the 2017–18 the division was disbanded and all teams promoted to the newly regionalised Gloucester 2 - Gloucester 2 North or Gloucester 2 South.

Gloucester 3
Season	No of teams	Champions	Runners–up	Relegated Teams	Ref
2009–10	8	Newent	Smiths	No relegation	
2010–11	7	Broad Plain	Gloucester All Blues	No relegation	
2011–12	7	Bredon Star	Cainscross	No relegation	
2012–13	7	Old Cryptians	Westbury-on-Severn	No relegation	
2013–14	7	Old Elizabethans	Tredworth	No relegation	
2014–15	8	Smiths	Minchinhampton	No relegation	
2015–16	6	Old Elizabethans	Cheltenham Civil Service	No relegation	
2016–17	8	Cotham Park	Aretians	No relegation	
2017–18	9	United Bristol Hospitals	Norton (Note: 5 other teams promoted into either Gloucester 2 North or South for the following season as this was the last for Gloucester 3.)	No relegation	
Green backgrounds are promotion places.

== Promotion play-offs ==
Between 2001 and 2005 there was a promotion play-off between the runners-up of Gloucester 3 North and Gloucester 3 South for the third and final promotion place to Gloucester 2. The team with the superior league record had home advantage in the tie. During the 2005–06 season the play-offs were discontinued as Gloucester 3 would merge into one division for the 2006–07 season. Before they were discontinued Gloucester 3 North teams have been the most successful with three wins to the Gloucester 3 South teams' two; and the home team has won promotion on all five occasions.

League v League promotion play-off results
Season	Home team	Score	Away team	Venue	Attendance
2000–01	Old Colstonians (S)	39-7	Ross-on-Wye (N)	Colton's School, Stapleton, Bristol	
2001–02	Smiths (N)	23-14	Cainscross (S)	Prince of Wales Stadium, Cheltenham, Gloucestershire	
2002–03	Dursley (N)	41-19	Bristol Aeroplane Co. (S)	Stragglers Sports Ground, Stinchcombe, Dursley, Gloucestershire	
2003–04	Cotham Park (S) (Note: The result of the 2003-04 promotion playoff between Cotham Park and Cainscross is not listed on the RFU website, although Cotham Park would have had home advantage as they had a better league record than Cainscross. We do, however, know that Cotham Park won this game as they were in Gloucester 2 the next season while Cainscross were not.)		Cainscross (N)	Beggar Bush Lane, Failand, Somerset	
2004–05	Smiths (N)	26-20	Tetbury (S)	Prince of Wales Stadium, Cheltenham, Gloucestershire	
2005–06	No promotion playoff. (Note: There would be no promotion playoff at the end of the 2005-06 season as Gloucester 3 would become a single division the following season. Instead, both champions and runners up from Gloucester 3 North and Gloucester 3 South would be automatically promoted into Gloucester 2.)				
Green background is the promoted team.

== Number of league titles ==
- St Brendan's Old Boys (3) (Note: One of St Brendan's Old Boys titles was won in Gloucester 3 South.)
- Dursley (2)
- Gloucester Civil Service (2)
- Ross-on-Wye (2) (Note: Ross-on-Wye's titles were won in Gloucester 3 North.)
- Old Elizabethans (2)
- Smiths (2)
- Bishopston (1)
- Bredon Star (1)
- Broad Plain (1)
- Bristol Aeroplane Co. (1) (Note: Bristol Aeroplane's title was won in Gloucester 3 South.)
- Bristol Telephone Area (1)
- Caincross (1)
- Cheltenham Civil Service (1) (Note: Cheltenham Civil Service's title was won in Gloucester 3 North.)
- Cotham Park (1)
- Frampton Cotterell (1)
- Gloucester All Blues (1)
- Hartpury College (1) (Note: Hartpury College's title was won in Gloucester 3 North.)
- Hucclecote Old Boys (1) (Note: Currently known as Hucclecote RFC.)
- Kingswood (1) (Note: Kingswood's title was won in Gloucester 3 South.)
- Minchinhampton (1) (Note: Minchinhampton's title was won in Gloucester 3 South.)
- Newent (1)
- Old Bristolians (1)
- Old Colstonians (1) (Note: Old Colstonians title was won in Gloucester 3 South.)
- Old Cryptians (1)
- Painswick (1)
- Southmead (1)
- Tetbury (1) (Note: Tetbury's title was won in Gloucester 3 South.)
- Tredworth (1)
- United Bristol Hospitals (1)
- Widden Old Boys (1) (Note: Widden Old Boys title was won in Gloucester 3 North.)

== See also ==
- Gloucestershire RFU
- English rugby union system
- Rugby union in England
