= Counties 3 Gloucestershire =

English rugby union league

- Current season or competition: 2024-25 Counties 3 Gloucestershire
- Sport: Rugby union
- Instituted: 1987; 39 years ago (as Gloucestershire 1)
- Number of teams: 12
- Country: England
- Most titles: Aretians, Bristol Saracens, Old Bristolians, Spartans, Tewkesbury (2 titles)
- Website: englandrugby.com

Counties 3 Gloucestershire (formerly Gloucester 1) is an English rugby union league which sits at the ninth level of league rugby union in England for teams based primarily in the county of Gloucestershire but also on occasion teams from Bristol. Promoted clubs move into Counties 2 Gloucestershire North or Counties 2 Gloucestershire South depending on location. Relegated clubs drop into either Counties 4 Gloucestershire.

== Teams 2026-27 ==
=== North ===
Departing were Hucclecote promoted to Counties 2 Gloucestershire while Spartans (Gloucester), Drybrook II and Old Cryptians were relegated to Counties 4 Gloucestershire (North).

| Team | Ground | Capacity | Town/Village | Previous season |
|---|---|---|---|---|
| Berry Hill | Lakers Road | | Coleford, Gloucestershire | 6th |
| Bredon Star | Bredon Playing Fields | | Bredon, Worcestershire | 3rd |
| Brockworth | Mill Lane | | Brockworth, Gloucestershire | 9th |
| Cheltenham Saracens | King George V Playing Field | | Cheltenham, Gloucestershire | 4th |
| Cirencester | The Whiteway | | Cirencester, Gloucestershire | 2nd |
| Coney Hill | Metz Hill | | Gloucester, Gloucestershire | 7th |
| Dursley | Stragglers Sports Ground | | Stinchcombe, Dursley, Gloucestershire | Relegated from Counties 2 Gloucestershire |
| Gloucester Old Boys | Horton Road | | Gloucester, Gloucestershire | 8th |
| Longlevens II | Longford Lane | | Longlevens, Gloucestershire | Promoted from Counties 4 Gloucestershire (North) |
| Lydney II | Regentsholm | 1,500 | Lydney, Gloucestershire | 5th |
| Old Richians | Sandyleaze | | Gloucester, Gloucestershire | Relegated from Counties 2 Gloucestershire |
| Widden Old Boys | The Memorial Ground | | Gloucester, Gloucestershire | Promoted from Counties 4 Gloucestershire (North) |

Locations of the 2026-27 Counties 3 Gloucestershire (North) teams

=== South ===
Departing were Bristol Saracens promoted to Counties 2 Gloucestershire while Cotham Park (9th) were relegated to Counties 4 Gloucestershire (South).

| Team | Ground | Capacity | Town/Village | Previous season |
|---|---|---|---|---|
| Ashley Down Old Boys | Lockleaze Combination Ground | | Lockleaze, Bristol | 4th |
| Avonmouth Old Boys | Barracks Lane | | Shirehampton, Bristol | 3rd |
| Barton Hill | Duncombe Road | | Speedwell, Bristol | 2nd |
| Chipping Sodbury | The Ridings | | Chipping Sodbury, Gloucestershire | Promoted from Counties 4 Gloucestershire (South) (3rd) 9th |
| Cleve II | The Hayfields | | Mangotsfield, Gloucestershire | Promoted from Counties 4 Gloucestershire (South) (7th) |
| Frampton Cotterell II | The Park | | Frampton Cotterell, Gloucestershire | Promoted from Counties 4 Gloucestershire (South) (champions) |
| Kingswood | Grimsbury Road Playing Fields | | Warmley, Kingswood, Gloucestershire | 10th |
| North Bristol | Oaklands | | Almondsbury, Bristol | 5th |
| Old Colstonians | Colton's School | | Stapleton, Bristol | 7th |
| Southmead | Greenway Centre | | Southmead, Bristol | 8th |
| Whitehall | Foundry Lane | | Whitehall, Bristol | 6th |
| Yate | Yate Outdoor Sports Complex | | Yate, Gloucestershire | Promoted from Counties 4 Gloucestershire (South) (runners-up) |

Locations of the 2026-27 Counties 3 Gloucestershire (South) teams in Gloucestershire and Somerset
Locations of the 2026-27 Counties 3 Gloucestershire (South) teams in Bristol

== Teams 2025-26 ==
=== North ===
With the consolidation of the North & South divisions in Counties 2 Gloucestershire only one team, Tewkesbury, were promoted.

Only three teams (2nd-4th) retained their places in the league, all other teams, those placed 5th-10th, were cascaded down a level the RFU pyramid to Counties 4 Gloucestershire (North) with the exception of Norton (8th) and Chosen Hill FP II (10th) who dropped out of the RFU league pyramid.

| Team | Ground | Capacity | Town/Village | Previous season |
|---|---|---|---|---|
| Berry Hill | Lakers Road | | Coleford, Gloucestershire | Demoted from Counties 2 Gloucestershire (North) (11th) |
| Bredon Star | Bredon Playing Fields | | Bredon, Worcestershire | Demoted from Counties 2 Gloucestershire (North) (6th) |
| Brockworth | Mill Lane | | Brockworth, Gloucestershire | Demoted from Counties 2 Gloucestershire (North) (12th) |
| Cheltenham Saracens | King George V Playing Field | | Cheltenham, Gloucestershire | 3rd |
| Cirencester | The Whiteway | | Cirencester, Gloucestershire | Demoted from Counties 2 Gloucestershire (North) (9th) |
| Coney Hill | Metz Hill | | Gloucester, Gloucestershire | Demoted from Counties 2 Gloucestershire (North) (8th) |
| Drybrook II | Mannings Ground | | Drybrook, Gloucestershire | Promoted from Counties 4 Gloucestershire |
| Gloucester Old Boys | Horton Road | | Gloucester, Gloucestershire | Demoted from Counties 2 Gloucestershire (North) (10th) |
| Hucclecote | Charlies Way | | Hucclecote, Gloucestershire | Demoted from Counties 2 Gloucestershire (North) (7th) |
| Lydney II | Regentsholm | 1,500 | Lydney, Gloucestershire | Demoted from Counties 2 Gloucestershire (South) (11th) |
| Old Cryptians | The Memorial Ground | | Gloucester, Gloucestershire | 4th |
| Spartans (Gloucester) | Lansdown Road | | Gloucester, Gloucestershire | 2nd |

Locations of the 2025-26 Counties 3 Gloucestershire (North) teams

=== South ===
With the consolidation of the North & South divisions in Counties 2 Gloucestershire no team was promoted.

Those teams who finished 1st-7th retained their place in the league whilst those placed 8th-12th were cascaded down a level the RFU pyramid to Counties 4 Gloucestershire (South).

Broad Plain (2nd in 2024-25) started but did not complete the season leaving ten clubs to contest the outstanding fixtures.

| Team | Ground | Capacity | Town/Village | Previous season |
|---|---|---|---|---|
| Ashley Down Old Boys | Lockleaze Combination Ground | | Lockleaze, Bristol | 4th |
| Avonmouth Old Boys | Barracks Lane | | Shirehampton, Bristol | 1st (not promoted) |
| Barton Hill | Duncombe Road | | Speedwell, Bristol | 3rd |
| Bristol Saracens | Bakewell Memorial Ground | | Cribbs Causeway, Bristol | Demoted from Counties 2 Gloucestershire (South) (7th) |
| Cotham Park | Beggar Bush Lane | | Failand, Somerset | 7th |
| Kingswood | Grimsbury Road Playing Fields | | Warmley, Kingswood, Gloucestershire | 6th |
| North Bristol | Oaklands | | Almondsbury, Bristol | Demoted from Counties 2 Gloucestershire (South) (10th) |
| Old Colstonians | Colton's School | | Stapleton, Bristol | Demoted from Counties 2 Gloucestershire (South) (8th) |
| Southmead | Greenway Centre | | Southmead, Bristol | Demoted from Counties 2 Gloucestershire (South) (9th) |
| Whitehall | Foundry Lane | | Whitehall, Bristol | 5th |

Locations of the 2025-26 Counties 3 Gloucestershire (South) teams in Gloucestershire and Somerset
Locations of the 2025-26 Counties 3 Gloucestershire (South) teams in Bristol

== Teams 2024–25 ==
=== North ===
Departing were Bredon Star and Gloucester Old Boys, promoted to Counties 2 Gloucestershire North whilst Painswick (10th) and Ross-on-Wye (11th) were relegated to Counties 4 Gloucestershire.

Spartans (Gloucester) re-entered the leagues having withdrawn from Counties 2 Gloucestershire North ahead of the 2023-24 season.

| Team | Ground | Capacity | Town/Village | Previous season |
|---|---|---|---|---|
| Cheltenham Saracens | King George V Playing Field | | Cheltenham, Gloucestershire | 7th |
| Chosen Hill Former Pupils II | Brookfield Road | | Churchdown, Gloucestershire | 9th |
| Longlevens II | Longford Lane | | Longlevens, Gloucestershire | 6th |
| Matson II | Redwell Road | | Matson, Gloucester, Gloucestershire | 5th |
| Minchinhampton | Hollybush Ground | | Minchinhampton, Gloucestershire | 8th |
| Norton | Norton Parish Grounds | | Norton, Gloucestershire | Promoted from Counties 4 Gloucestershire (North) |
| Old Cryptians | The Memorial Ground | | Gloucester, Gloucestershire | Relegated from Counties 2 Gloucestershire North (11th) |
| Spartans (Gloucester) | Lansdown Road | | Gloucester, Gloucestershire | Re-entry |
| Tewkesbury | The Moats | | Tewkesbury, Gloucestershire | 4th |
| Widden Old Boys | The Memorial Ground | | Gloucester, Gloucestershire | 3rd |

Locations of the 2024-25 Counties 3 Gloucestershire (North) teams

=== South ===
Departing were Lydney II and Southmead promoted to Counties 2 Gloucestershire South. Aretians (10th) and Bishopston (11th) were relegated to Counties 4 Gloucestershire.

Barton Hill re-entered the leagues having withdrawn from Counties 1 Western North ahead of the 2023-24 season.

| Team | Ground | Capacity | Town/Village | Previous season |
|---|---|---|---|---|
| Ashley Down Old Boys | Lockleaze Combination Ground | | Lockleaze, Bristol | 4th |
| Avonmouth Old Boys | Barracks Lane | | Shirehampton, Bristol | Relegated from Counties 2 Gloucestershire South (11th) |
| Barton Hill | Duncombe Road | | Speedwell, Bristol | Re-entry |
| Bristol Aeroplane Company | BAWA Sportsground | | Filton, Bristol | 8th |
| Broad Plain | Bristol South End | | Bedminster, Bristol | 3rd |
| Clifton III | Station Road | 2,500 (400 seats) | Cribbs Causeway, Patchway, Bristol | 6th |
| Cotham Park | Beggar Bush Lane | | Failand, Somerset | 5th |
| Dings Crusaders III | Shaftsbury Park | 2,250 (250 seats) | Frenchay, Bristol | Promoted from Counties 4 Gloucestershire South (runners-up) |
| Kingswood | Grimsbury Road Playing Fields | | Warmley, Kingswood, Gloucestershire | Promoted from Counties 4 Gloucestershire South (champions) |
| Old Bristolians II | Memorial Playing Fields | | Failand, Somerset | 9th |
| St Brendan's Old Boys | Coombe Dingle Sports Complex | | Coombe Dingle, Bristol | 7th |
| Whitehall | Foundry Lane | | Whitehall, Bristol | Relegated from Counties 2 Gloucestershire South (12th) |

Locations of the 2024-25 Counties 3 Gloucestershire (South) teams in Gloucestershire and Somerset
Locations of the 2024-25 Counties 3 Gloucestershire (South) teams in Bristol

== Teams 2023–24 ==
=== North ===
Departing were Old Patesians and Stroud, promoted to Counties 2 Gloucestershire North whilst Norton (11th) were relegated to Counties 4 Gloucestershire North. Fairford (9th) left on a level transfer to Counties 3 Tribute Dorset & Wilts North.

| Team | Ground | Capacity | Town/Village | Previous season |
|---|---|---|---|---|
| Bredon Star | Bredon Playing Fields | | Bredon, Worcestershire | 5th |
| Cheltenham Saracens | King George V Playing Field | | Cheltenham, Gloucestershire | Relegated from Counties 2 Gloucestershire North |
| Chosen Hill Former Pupils II | Brookfield Road | | Churchdown, Gloucestershire | 8th |
| Gloucester Old Boys | Horton Road | | Gloucester, Gloucestershire | 3rd |
| Longlevens II | Longford Lane | | Longlevens, Gloucestershire | Promoted from Counties 4 Gloucestershire North (champions) |
| Matson II | Redwell Road | | Matson, Gloucester, Gloucestershire | 7th |
| Minchinhampton | Hollybush Ground | | Minchinhampton, Gloucestershire | 10th |
| Painswick | Broadham Fields | | Painswick, Gloucestershire | Promoted from Counties 4 Gloucestershire North (runners-up) |
| Ross-on-Wye | Abbotts Close | | Ross-on-Wye, Herefordshire | Relegated from Counties 2 Gloucestershire North |
| Tewkesbury | The Moats | | Tewkesbury, Gloucestershire | 6th |
| Widden Old Boys | The Memorial Ground | | Gloucester, Gloucestershire | 4th |

Locations of the 2023-24 Counties 3 Gloucestershire (North) teams

=== South ===
Departing were North Bristol and Old Colstonians promoted to Counties 2 Gloucestershire South. Frampton Cottrell II were relegated to Counties 4 Gloucestershire South

| Team | Ground | Capacity | Town/Village | Previous season |
|---|---|---|---|---|
| Aretians | Little Stoke Park | | Little Stoke, Bristol | 11th |
| Ashley Down Old Boys | Lockleaze Combination Ground | | Lockleaze, Bristol | 3rd |
| Bishopston | Bonnington Walk | | Lockleaze, Bristol | 9th |
| Bristol Aeroplane Company | BAWA Sportsground | | Filton, Bristol | Promoted from Counties 4 Gloucestershire South (champions) |
| Broad Plain | Bristol South End | | Bedminster, Bristol | 4th |
| Clifton III | Station Road | 2,500 (400 seats) | Cribbs Causeway, Patchway, Bristol | Promoted from Counties 4 Gloucestershire South (runners-up) |
| Cotham Park | Beggar Bush Lane | | Failand, Somerset | 6th |
| Lydney II | Regentsholm | 1,500 | Lydney, Gloucestershire | Relegated from Counties 2 Gloucestershire South |
| Old Bristolians II | Memorial Playing Fields | | Failand, Somerset | 8th |
| Southmead | Greenway Centre | | Southmead, Bristol | 5th |
| St Brendan's Old Boys | Coombe Dingle Sports Complex | | Coombe Dingle, Bristol | 7th |

Locations of the 2023-24 Counties 3 Gloucestershire (South) teams in Gloucestershire and Somerset
Locations of the 2023-24 Counties 3 Gloucestershire (South) teams in Bristol

== Teams 2022–23 ==
This was the first season following the RFU Adult Competition Review.

=== North ===
Departing were Smiths, Gordon League, Brockworth, Cirencester and Old Centralians II - all promoted to Counties 2 Gloucestershire North as were Berry Hill and Drybrook II to Counties 2 Gloucestershire South.

Old Patesians had finished 13th in Tribute South West 1 West an elected to suffer a triple relegation (bypassing levels 7 & 8) ahead of the new season.

| Team | Ground | Capacity | Town/Village | Previous season |
|---|---|---|---|---|
| Bredon Star | Bredon Playing Fields | | Bredon, Worcestershire | Promoted from Gloucester 2 (North) |
| Chosen Hill Former Pupils II | Brookfield Road | | Churchdown, Gloucestershire | 11th |
| Fairford | Coln House School Playing Grounds | | Fairford, Gloucestershire | 10th |
| Gloucester Old Boys | Horton Road | | Gloucester, Gloucestershire | 8th |
| Matson II | Redwell Road | | Matson, Gloucester, Gloucestershire | 12th |
| Minchinhampton | Hollybush Ground | | Minchinhampton, Gloucestershire | Promoted from Gloucester 2 (North) |
| Norton | Norton Parish Grounds | | Norton, Gloucestershire | Promoted from Gloucester 2 (North) |
| Old Patesians | Everest Road | | Cheltenham, Gloucestershire | Relegated from Tribute South West 1 West (13th) |
| Stroud | Fromehall Park | 4,000 (200 seats) | Stroud, Gloucestershire | Promoted from Gloucester 2 (North) |
| Tewkesbury | The Moats | | Tewkesbury, Gloucestershire | Promoted from Gloucester 2 (North) |
| Widden Old Boys | The Memorial Ground | | Gloucester, Gloucestershire | 9th |

Locations of the 2022-23 Counties 3 Gloucestershire (North) teams

=== South ===
Departing were Bream, Dursley, Lydney II, St Mary's Old Boys and Whitehall - all promoted to Counties 2 Gloucestershire South.

Thornbury II (10th), Avonmouth Old Boys II (11th) and Barton Hill II (12th) were relegated to Counties 4 Gloucestershire (South).

United Bristol Hospitals (9th) withdrew from league competition ahead of the new season.

| Team | Ground | Capacity | Town/Village | Previous season |
|---|---|---|---|---|
| Aretians | Little Stoke Park | | Little Stoke, Bristol | 7th |
| Ashley Down Old Boys | Lockleaze Combination Ground | | Lockleaze, Bristol | 5th |
| Bishopston | Bonnington Walk | | Lockleaze, Bristol | Promoted from Gloucester 2 (South) (7th) |
| Broad Plain | Bristol South End | | Bedminster, Bristol | Promoted from Gloucester 2 (South) (5th) |
| Cotham Park | Beggar Bush Lane | | Failand, Somerset | Promoted from Gloucester 2 (South) (3rd) |
| Frampton Cotterell II | The Park | | Frampton Cotterell, Gloucestershire | Promoted from Gloucester 2 (South) (8th) |
| North Bristol | Oaklands | | Almondsbury, Bristol | Promoted from Gloucester 2 (South) (Runners-Up) |
| Old Bristolians II | Memorial Playing Fields | | Failand, Somerset | Promoted from Gloucester 2 (South) (6th) |
| Old Colstonians | Colton's School | | Stapleton, Bristol | Promoted from Gloucester 2 (South) (Champions) |
| Southmead | Greenway Centre | | Southmead, Bristol | Promoted from Gloucester 2 (South) (4th) |
| St Brendan's Old Boys | Coombe Dingle Sports Complex | | Coombe Dingle, Bristol | 8th |

Locations of the 2022-23 Counties 3 Gloucestershire (South) teams in Gloucestershire and Somerset
Locations of the 2022-23 Counties 3 Gloucestershire (South) teams in Bristol

== Teams 2021–22 ==
For the new season Gloucester 1 was split into North and South Divisions with the addition of several second teams from sides higher in the pyramid with twelve clubs in each division. The teams competing in 2021–22 achieved their places in the league based on performances in 2019–20, the 'previous season' column in the table below refers to that season not 2020–21.

=== North ===
| Team | Ground | Capacity | Town/Village | Previous season |
|---|---|---|---|---|
| Berry Hill | Lakers Road | | Coleford, Gloucestershire | 10th |
| Brockworth | Mill Lane | | Brockworth, Gloucestershire | Promoted from Gloucester 2 (North) |
| Chosen Hill Former Pupils II | Brookfield Road | | Churchdown, Gloucestershire | New entry |
| Cirencester | The Whiteway | | Cirencester, Gloucestershire | 6th |
| Drybrook II | Mannings Ground | | Drybrook, Gloucestershire | New entry |
| Fairford | Coln House School Playing Grounds | | Fairford, Gloucestershire | 5th |
| Gloucester Old Boys | Horton Road | | Gloucester, Gloucestershire | 8th |
| Gordon League | Hempsted Lane | | Gloucester, Gloucestershire | 9th |
| Matson II | Redwell Road | | Matson, Gloucester, Gloucestershire | New entry |
| Old Centralians II | Saintbridge Sports Centre | | Gloucester, Gloucestershire | New entry |
| Smiths | Prince of Wales Stadium | 3,500 (500 seats) | Cheltenham, Gloucestershire | 3rd |
| Widden Old Boys | The Memorial Ground | | Gloucester, Gloucestershire | Relegated from Gloucester Premier (12th) |

Locations of the 2021-22 Gloucester 1 (North) teams

=== South ===
| Team | Ground | Capacity | Town/Village | Previous season |
|---|---|---|---|---|
| Aretians | Little Stoke Park | | Little Stoke, Bristol | Promoted from Gloucester 2 (South) |
| Ashley Down Old Boys | Lockleaze Combination Ground | | Lockleaze, Bristol | Promoted from Gloucester 2 (South |
| Avonmouth Old Boys II | Barracks Lane | | Shirehampton, Bristol | New entry |
| Barton Hill II | Duncombe Road | | Speedwell, Bristol | New entry |
| Bream | High Street | | Bream, Lydney, Gloucestershire | Promoted from Gloucester 2 (North) |
| Dursley | Stragglers Sports Ground | | Stinchcombe, Dursley, Gloucestershire | 4th |
| Lydney II | Regentsholm | 1,500 | Lydney, Gloucestershire | New entry |
| St Brendan's Old Boys | Coombe Dingle Sports Complex | | Coombe Dingle, Bristol | 7th |
| St Mary's Old Boys | Trench Lane | | Almondsbury, Bristol | Relegated from Gloucester Premier (9th) |
| Thornbury II | Cooper's Farm | | Thornbury, Gloucestershire | New entry |
| United Bristol Hospitals | Portway Development Ground | | Portway, Bristol | Promoted from Gloucester 2 (South) |
| Whitehall | Foundry Lane | | Whitehall, Bristol | Relegated from Gloucester Premier (11th) |

Locations of the 2021-22 Gloucester 1 (South) teams
Locations of the 2021-22 Gloucester 2 South teams in Bristol

== 2020–21 ==
Due to the COVID-19 pandemic, the 2020–21 season was cancelled.

== Teams 2019–20 ==
| Team | Ground | Capacity | Town/Village | Previous season |
|---|---|---|---|---|
| Cirencester | The Whiteway | | Cirencester, Gloucestershire | 4th |
| Dursley | Stragglers Sports Ground | | Stinchcombe, Dursley, Gloucestershire | 5th |
| Fairford | Coln House School Playing Grounds | | Fairford, Gloucestershire | Promoted from Gloucester 2 North (playoff) |
| Gloucester Old Boys | Horton Road | | Gloucester, Gloucestershire | Relegated from Gloucester Premier (12th) |
| Gordon League | Hempsted Lane | | Gloucester, Gloucestershire | Relegated from Gloucester Premier (11th) |
| North Bristol | Oaklands | | Almondsbury, Bristol | 8th |
| Old Colstonians | Colton's School | | Stapleton, Bristol | 6th |
| Old Cryptians | The Memorial Ground | | Gloucester, Gloucestershire | 3rd |
| Old Elizabethans | Severn Road | | Hallen, Gloucestershire | 9th |
| Smiths | Prince of Wales Stadium | 3,500 (500 seats) | Cheltenham, Gloucestershire | 7th |
| St Brendan's Old Boys | Coombe Dingle Sports Complex | | Coombe Dingle, Bristol | Promoted from Gloucester 2 South (champions) |
| Tewkesbury | The Moats | | Tewkesbury, Gloucestershire | Promoted from Gloucester 2 North (champions) |

Locations of the 2019-20 Gloucester 1 teams

== Teams 2018–19 ==
| Team | Ground | Capacity | Town/Village | Previous season |
|---|---|---|---|---|
| Bredon Star | Bredon Playing Fields | | Bredon, Worcestershire | 8th |
| Brockworth | Mill Lane | | Brockworth, Gloucestershire | 9th |
| Cheltenham North | Stoke Orchard Road | | Bishop's Cleeve, Gloucestershire | 5th |
| Cirencester | The Whiteway | | Cirencester, Gloucestershire | Relegated from Gloucester Premier (12th) |
| Dursley | Stragglers Sports Ground | | Stinchcombe, Dursley, Gloucestershire | 6th |
| North Bristol | Oaklands | | Almondsbury, Bristol | 10th |
| Old Colstonians | Colton's School | | Stapleton, Bristol | 3rd |
| Old Cryptians | The Memorial Ground | | Gloucester, Gloucestershire | 7th |
| Old Elizabethans | Severn Road | | Hallen, Gloucestershire | 4th |
| Ross-on-Wye | Abbotts Close | | Ross-on-Wye, Herefordshire | Promoted from Gloucester 2 (champions) |
| Smiths | Prince of Wales Stadium | 3,500 (500 seats) | Cheltenham, Gloucestershire | Promoted from Gloucester 2 (runners up) |
| Southmead | Greenway Centre | | Southmead, Bristol | 11th |

Locations of the 2018-19 Gloucester 1 teams

== Teams 2017–18 ==
| Team | Ground | Capacity | Town/Village | Previous season |
|---|---|---|---|---|
| Berry Hill | Lakers Road | | Coleford, Gloucestershire | Relegated from Gloucester Premier (11th) |
| Bredon Star | Bredon Playing Fields | | Bredon, Worcestershire | 7th |
| Brockworth | Mill Lane | | Brockworth, Gloucestershire | 3rd |
| Cheltenham North | Stoke Orchard Road | | Bishop's Cleeve, Gloucestershire | Relegated from Gloucester Premier (10th) |
| Dursley | Stragglers Sports Ground | | Stinchcombe, Dursley, Gloucestershire | 5th |
| North Bristol | Oaklands | | Almondsbury, Bristol | Relegated from Gloucester Premier (12th) |
| Old Colstonians | Colton's School | | Stapleton, Bristol | Promoted from Gloucester 2 (champions) |
| Old Cryptians | The Memorial Ground | | Gloucester, Gloucestershire | 4th |
| Old Elizabethans | Severn Road | | Hallen, Gloucestershire | Promoted from Gloucester 2 (runners up) |
| Southmead | Greenway Centre | | Southmead, Bristol | 9th |
| St Brendan's Old Boys | Coombe Dingle Sports Complex | | Coombe Dingle, Bristol | 8th |
| Widden Old Boys | The Memorial Ground | | Gloucester, Gloucestershire | 6th |

Locations of the 2017-18 Gloucester 1 teams

== Teams 2016–17 ==
- Ashley Downs Old Boys (promoted from Gloucester 2)
- Bream (relegated from Gloucester Premier)
- Bredon Star
- Brockworth
- Dursley
- Gloucester Old Boys
- Old Cryptians
- Southmead
- Spartans (promoted from Gloucester 2)
- St Brendan's Old Boys
- Tewkesbury (relegated from Gloucester Premier)
- Widden Old Boys

== Teams 2015–16 ==
The 2015–16 Gloucester 1 consists of twelve teams from Gloucestershire and Bristol as well as one team just over the border in Worcestershire. The season starts on 12 September 2015 and is due to end on 23 April 2016. Eight of the twelve teams participated in last season's competition. The 2014–15 champions Longlevens and runners up Chipping Sodbury were promoted to the Gloucester Premier while Old Colstonians and Kingswood were relegated to Gloucester 2.

Locations of the 2015-16 Gloucester 1 teams

| Team | Ground | Capacity | Town/Village | Previous season |
|---|---|---|---|---|
| Bishopston | Bonnington Walk | | Stoke Gifford, Bristol | Promoted from Gloucester 2 (runners up) |
| Bredon Star | Bredon Playing Fields | | Bredon, Worcestershire | 10th |
| Brockworth | Mill Lane | | Brockworth, Gloucestershire | 3rd |
| Dursley | Stragglers Sports Ground | | Stinchcombe, Dursley, Gloucestershire | 5th |
| Gloucester Old Boys | Horton Road | | Gloucester, Gloucestershire | 8th |
| Gordon League | Hempsted Lane | | Gloucester, Gloucestershire | Relegated from Gloucester Premier (11th) |
| Old Cryptians | The Memorial Ground | | Gloucester, Gloucestershire | 6th |
| Old Richians | Sandyleaze | | Gloucester, Gloucestershire | 7th |
| Painswick | Broadham Fields | | Painswick, Gloucestershire | Relegated from Gloucester Premier (12th) |
| Southmead | Greenway Centre | | Southmead, Bristol | 9th |
| St Brendan's Old Boys | Coombe Dingle Sports Complex | | Coombe Dingle, Bristol | Promoted from Gloucester 2 (champions) |
| Widden Old Boys | The Memorial Ground | | Gloucester, Gloucestershire | 4th |

== Teams 2014–15 ==
- Bredon Star (promoted from Gloucester 2)
- Brockworth
- Chipping Sodbury
- Dursley (relegated from Gloucester Premier)
- Gloucester Old Boys
- Kingswood
- Longlevens
- Old Colstonians
- Old Cryptians (promoted from Gloucester 2)
- Old Richians
- Southmead (relegated from Gloucester Premier)
- Widden Old Boys

== Teams 2013–14 ==
- Ashley Down Old Boys (promoted from Gloucester 2)
- Bishopston
- Bream (promoted from Gloucester 2)
- Brockworth
- Chipping Sodbury
- Gloucester Old Boys
- Kingswood
- Longlevens
- Old Colstonians
- Old Richians
- Widden Old Boys (relegated from Gloucester Premier)

== Teams 2012–13 ==
- Bishopston
- Broad Plain
- Brockworth
- Cheltenham Saracens
- Chipping Sodbury
- Gloucester Old Boys
- Hucclecote
- Kingswood
- Longlevens
- Newent
- Old Colstonians
- Old Richians

== Teams 2011–12 ==
- Ashley Down Old Boys
- Bream
- Brockworth
- Cheltenham Saracens (promoted from Gloucester 2)
- Dursley
- Gloucester Old Boys
- Hucclecote
- Kingswood
- Newent (promoted from Gloucester 2)
- Ross-on-Wye
- Spartans

== Teams 2010–11 ==
- Aretians
- Ashley Down Old Boys
- Bishopston
- Bream
- Cheltenham Civil Service
- Cotham Park
- Dursley
- Hucclecote
- Kingswood
- Longlevens
- Painswick
- Spartans

== Teams 2009–10 ==
- Aretians
- Ashley Down Old Boys
- Bishopston
- Bream
- Brockworth
- Cheltenham Civil Service
- Chipping Sodbury
- Dursley
- Longlevens
- Old Bristolians
- Old Cryptians
- Painswick

== Teams 2008–09 ==
- Aretians
- Ashley Down Old Boys
- Bishopston
- Brockworth
- Cheltenham Civil Service
- Chipping Sodbury
- Dursley
- Longlevens
- Old Bristolians
- Painswick
- Ross-on-Wye
- Tewkesbury

== Teams 2007–08 ==
- Bishopston
- Bream
- Bristol Saracens
- Brockworth
- Chipping Sodbury
- Dursley
- Longlevens
- Old Bristolians
- Painswick
- Ross-on-Wye
- Southmead
- Tewkesbury

== Teams 2006–07 ==
- Bishopston
- Bream
- Bristol Saracens
- Brockworth
- Cheltenham Civil Service
- Chipping Sodbury
- Hartpury College
- Hucclecote
- Old Bristolians
- Old Cryptians
- Southmead
- Tewkesbury

== Teams 2005–06 ==
- Bristol Saracens
- Bishopston
- Bream
- Cheltenham Civil Service
- Chipping Sodbury
- Cirencester
- Frampton Cotterell
- Old Bristolians
- Southmead
- Tewkesbury

== Teams 2004–05 ==
- Ashley Down Old Boys
- Bristol Saracens
- Bishopston
- Cirencester
- Chipping Sodbury
- Frampton Cotterell
- Old Bristolians
- Old Colstonians
- Old Cryptians
- Widden Old Boys

== Teams 2003–04 ==
- Ashley Down Old Boys
- Bishopston
- Bristol Saracens
- Brockworth
- Cheltenham Saracens
- Frampton Cotterell
- Hucclecote
- Southmead
- Tewkesbury
- Widden Old Boys

== Teams 2002–03 ==
- Ashley Down Old Boys
- Bishopston
- Bream
- Bristol Saracens
- Brockworth
- Chipping Sodbury
- Frampton Cotterell
- Old Bristolians
- Southmead
- Tewkesbury

== Teams 2001–02 ==
- Aretians
- Ashley Down Old Boys
- Bream
- Brockworth
- Frampton Cotterell
- Painswick
- Old Bristolians
- Old Cryptians
- Tewkesbury
- Westbury-on-Severn

== Teams 2000–01 ==
- Ashley Down Old Boys
- Cheltenham Civil Service
- Cheltenham Saracens
- Chosen Hill Former Pupils
- Frampton Cotterell
- Hucclecote
- Old Bristolians
- Old Cryptians
- Tetbury
- Westbury-on-Severn

== Original teams ==
When league rugby began in 1987 this division (known as Gloucestershire 1) contained the following teams:

- Bream
- Bristol Saracens
- Cheltenham North
- Dings Crusaders
- Drybrook
- Longlevens
- Old Colstonians
- Old Patesians
- Spartans
- St. Mary's Old Boys
- Widden Old Boys

== Gloucester 1 honours ==
=== Gloucestershire 1 (1987–1991) ===
Originally known as Gloucestershire 1, it was a tier 9 league with promotion to Gloucestershire/Somerset and relegation to Gloucester 2.

Gloucestershire 1
| Season | No of teams | Champions | Runners–up | Relegated Teams | Ref |
| 1987–88 | 11 | Spartans | Dings Crusaders | Bristol Saracens, Cheltenham North | |
| 1988–89 | 11 | Drybrook | Dings Crusaders | Old Colstonians | |
| 1989–90 | 11 | Dings Crusaders | Gloucester Old Boys | Tredworth | |
| 1990–91 | 11 | Gloucester Old Boys | Longlevens | Ashley Down Old Boys | |
Green backgrounds are promotion places.

=== Gloucester 1 (1991–1993) ===
Gloucestershire 1 was shorted to Gloucester 1 for the 1991–92 season onward. It remained a tier 9 league with promotion to Gloucestershire/Somerset and relegation to Gloucester 2.

Gloucester 1
| Season | No of teams | Champions | Runners–up | Relegated Teams | Ref |
| 1991–92 | 11 | Old Patesians | North Bristol (Note: Due to the restructuring of the majority of the south-west leagues from 11 to 13 teams for the 1992–93 season, 3rd place Thornbury were also promoted.) | No relegation (Note: There was no relegation this season as league was due to increase from 11 to 13 teams.) | |
| 1992–93 | 13 | St. Mary's Old Boys | Bream | Bristol Saracens | |
Green backgrounds are promotion places.

=== Gloucester 1 (1993–1996) ===
The creation of National League 5 South for the 1993–94 season meant that Gloucester 1 dropped to become a tier 10 league. Promotion continued to Gloucestershire/Somerset and relegation to Gloucester 2.

Gloucester 1
| Season | No of teams | Champions | Runners–up | Relegated Teams | Ref |
| 1993–94 | 13 | Stow-on-the-Wold | Cheltenham North | Ashley Down Old Boys, Saintbridge Former Pupils | |
| 1994–95 | 13 | Cleve | Longlevens | Painswick | |
| 1995–96 | 13 | Cheltenham North (Note: League restructuring caused by the cancellation of National 5 South meant that champions Cheltenham North were promoted two divisions up into Western Counties North (formerly Western Counties).) | Barton Hill (Note: The cancellation of National 5 South meant that clubs ranked 3rd to 9th were also promoted one level up into Gloucestershire/Somerset including Coney Hill, Longlevens, Frampton Cotterell, Old Richians, Bream, Brockworth, Old Cryptians.) | No relegation (Note: Widespread league restructuring meant that there was no relegation.) | |
Green backgrounds are promotion places.

=== Gloucester 1 (1996–2000) ===
The cancellation of National League 5 South at the end of the 1995–96 season meant that Gloucester 1 reverted to being a tier 9 league. Promotion continued to Gloucestershire/Somerset and relegation to Gloucester 2.

Gloucester 1
| Season | No of teams | Champions | Runners–up | Relegated Teams | Ref |
| 1996–97 | 13 | Bristol Saracens | Old Centralians | Widden Old Boys, Bishopston | |
| 1997–98 | 13 | Old Centralians | Chosen Hill Former Pupils | Bristol Telephone Area | |
| 1998–99 | 12 | Chipping Sodbury | Hucclecote | No relegation | |
| 1999–00 | 13 | Aretians | Chosen Hill Former Pupils | Cainscross, Southmead, Painswick, Old Bristolians | |
Green backgrounds are promotion places.

=== Gloucester 1 (2000–2009) ===
Gloucester 1 remained a tier 9 league despite the cancellation of Gloucestershire/Somerset at the end of the 1999–00 season. Promotion was now to the new Gloucester Premier, while relegation continued to Gloucester 2. Between 2007 and 2009 Gloucester 1 was sponsored by High Bridge Jewellers.

Gloucester 1
| Season | No of teams | Champions | Runners–up | Relegated Teams | Ref |
| 2000–01 | 10 | Chosen Hill Former Pupils | Hucclecote | Tetbury, Cheltenham Saracens | |
| 2001–02 | 10 | Aretians | Painswick | Westbury-on-Severn, Old Cryptians, Brockworth | |
| 2002–03 | 10 | Old Bristolians | Chipping Sodbury | Bream | |
| 2003–04 | 10 | Tewkesbury | Southmead | Hucclecote, Brockworth, Cheltenham Saracens | |
| 2004–05 | 10 | Widden Old Boys | Old Colstonians | Ashley Down Old Boys, Old Cryptians | |
| 2005–06 | 10 | Cirencester | Frampton Cotterell | No relegation (Note: There was no relegation as the division would be expanded from 10 to 12 teams for the next season.) | |
| 2006–07 | 12 | Hartpury College | Hucclecote | Cheltenham Civil Service, Old Cryptians | |
| 2007–08 | 12 | Bristol Saracens | Southmead | Bream | |
| 2008–09 | 12 | Tewkesbury | Ross-on-Wye | No relegation | |
Green backgrounds are promotion places.

=== Gloucester 1 (2009–2017) ===
Despite widespread restructuring by the RFU at the end of the 2008–09 season, Gloucester 1 remained a tier 9 league, with promotion continuing to Gloucester Premier and relegation to Gloucester 2.

Gloucester 1
| Season | No of teams | Champions | Runners–up | Relegated Teams | Ref |
| 2009–10 | 12 | Old Bristolians | Brockworth | Old Cryptians, Chipping Sodbury | |
| 2010–11 | 12 | Bishopston | Longlevens | Aretians, Cotham Park, Cheltenham Civil Service | |
| 2011–12 | 12 | Painswick | Dursley | Spartans, Ross-on-Wye, Bream | |
| 2012–13 | 12 | Newent | Hucclecote | Broad Plain | |
| 2013–14 | 12 | Bream | Cheltenham Saracens | Bishopston, Ashley Down Old Boys | |
| 2014–15 | 12 | Longlevens | Chipping Sodbury | Old Colstonians, Kingswood | |
| 2015–16 | 12 | Old Richians | Gordon League | Painswick, Bishopston | |
| 2016–17 | 12 | Spartans | Gloucester Old Boys | Bream, Ashley Down Old Boys, Tewkesbury | |
Green backgrounds are promotion places.

=== Gloucester 1 (2017–present) ===
Gloucester 1 remained a tier 9 league with promotion continuing to Gloucester Premier, while relegation was now to either Gloucester 2 North or Gloucester 2 South (formerly a single division). The league was now sponsored by Wadworth 6x.

Gloucester 1
| Season | No of teams | Champions | Runners–up | Relegated Teams | Ref |
| 2017–18 | 12 | Berry Hill | Widden Old Boys | St Brendan's Old Boys | |
| 2018–19 | 12 | Ross-on-Wye | Cheltenham North | Southmead, Bredon Star, Brockworth | |
| 2019–20 | 12 | Old Cryptians | Old Elizabethans | No relegation | |
| 2020–21 | 12 | | | | |
Green backgrounds are promotion places.

== Number of league titles ==
- Aretians (2)
- Bristol Saracens (2)
- Old Bristolians (2)
- Spartans (2)
- Tewkesbury (2)
- Berry Hill (1)
- Bishopston (1)
- Bream (1)
- Cheltenham North (1)
- Chipping Sodbury (1)
- Chosen Hill Former Pupils (1)
- Cirencester (1)
- Cleve (1)
- Dings Crusaders (1)
- Drybrook (1)
- Gloucester Old Boys (1)
- Hartpury College (1)
- Longlevens (1)
- Newent (1)
- Old Centralians (1)
- Old Cryptians (1)
- Old Richians (1)
- Painswick (1)
- Ross-on-Wye (1)
- St. Mary's Old Boys (1)
- Stow-on-the-Wold (1)
- Widden Old Boys (1)

== See also ==
- South West Division RFU
- Gloucestershire RFU
- English rugby union system
- Rugby union in England
