= Gloucester 4 =

English rugby union league

- Current season or competition: 1995–96 Gloucester 4
- Sport: Rugby union
- Instituted: 1987; 39 years ago (as Gloucestershire 4)
- Ceased: 1996; 30 years ago
- Country: England
- Holders: Minchinhampton (1st title) (1995–96 promoted to Gloucester 3)
- Most titles: Smiths (2 titles)

Gloucester 4 was an English rugby union league which sat at the twelve level of league rugby union in England for teams based in Gloucestershire and parts of Bristol. Promoted clubs moved into Gloucester 3 and there was no relegation as this was the basement league for club rugby union in Gloucestershire. In 1996 after ten seasons Gloucester 4 was discontinued at the end of the 1995-96 campaign.

== Original teams ==
When league rugby began in 1987 this division (then known as Gloucestershire 4) contained the following teams:

- Aretians
- Bristol Telephone Area
- Bristol Aeroplane Company
- Broad Plain
- Gloucester All Blues
- Hucclecote Old Boys (Note: Hucclecote Old Boys are currently known as Hucclecote RFC.)
- Minchinhampton
- Newent
- Old Colstonians
- Old Elizabethans
- Smiths

== Gloucester 4 honours ==
=== Gloucestershire 4 (1987–1989) ===
Originally a single division known as Gloucestershire 4, it was a tier 12 league. Promotion was to Gloucestershire 3 and there was no relegation.

Gloucestershire 4
Season	No of teams	Champions	Runners–up	Relegated Teams	Ref
1987–88	11	Smiths	Old Elizabethans	No relegation	
1988–89	12	Bristol Telephone Area	Hucclecote Old Boys	No relegation	
Green backgrounds are promotion places.

=== Gloucestershire 4A / 4B (1989–1991) ===
For the 1989–90 season Gloucestershitre 4 split into two tier 12 divisions - Gloucestershire 4A and Gloucestershire 4B. Promotion continued to Gloucestershire 3 and there was no relegation.

Gloucestershire 4 North / South
Season	No of teams	Champions	Runners–up	Relegated Teams	League Name	Ref
1989–90	7	Old Richians	Chosen Hill Former Pupils	No relegation	Gloucestershire 4A	
1989–90	7	Bishopston	Gloucester All Blues	No relegation	Gloucestershire 4B	
Green backgrounds are promotion places.

=== Gloucestershire 4 (1990–1991) ===
After a single season Gloucester 4 reverted to being a single division at tier 12 of the league system. Promotion continued to Gloucestershire 3 and there was no relegation.

Gloucestershire 4
Season	No of teams	Champions	Runners–up	Relegated Teams	Ref
1990–91	12	Stow-on-the-Wold	Southmead	No relegation	
Green backgrounds are promotion places.

=== Gloucester 4 (1991–1993) ===
Gloucestershire 4 was shorted to Gloucester 4 for the 1991–92 season onward. It remained a tier 12 league with promotion to Gloucester 3 and there was no relegation.

Gloucester 4
Season	No of teams	Champions	Runners–up	Relegated Teams	Ref
1991–92	11	Tetbury	Gloucester All Blues (Note: The expansion of the majority of south-west leagues from 11 to 13 teams for the follow seasons, meant that six teams were promoted, including Bristol Aeroplane, Westbury-on-Severn, Broad Plain and Gloucester Civil Service.)	No relegation	
1992–93	7	Smiths	Aretians	No relegation	
Green backgrounds are promotion places.

=== Gloucester 4 (1993–1996) ===
The creation of National League 5 South for the 1993–94 season meant that Gloucester 4 dropped to become a tier 13 league. Promotion continued to Gloucester 3 and there was no relegation. At the end of the 1995–96 Gloucester 4 was disbanded with the majority of teams promoted up into Gloucester 3.

Gloucester 4
Season	No of teams	Champions	Runners–up	Relegated Teams	Ref
1993–94	7	Tewkesbury	Minchinhampton	No relegation	
1994–95	7	Gloucestershire Police	Bristol Aeroplane Company	No relegation	
1995–96	7	Minchinhampton	Pilning (Note: The cancellation of Gloucester 4 meant that the majority of teams were promoted into Gloucester 3 including Gloucester All Blues, Newent, Wotton-under-Edge and Dowty. Another club, Tudorville, would drop out of the league system before the next season.)	No relegation	
Green backgrounds are promotion places.

== Number of league titles ==
- Smiths (2)
- Bishopston (1) (Note: Bishopston's title was Gloucestershire 4B.)
- Bristol Telephone Area (1)
- Gloucestershire Police (1)
- Minchinhampton (1)
- Old Richians (1) (Note: Old Richians title was Gloucestershire 4A.)
- Stow-on-the-Wold (1)
- Tetbury (1)
- Tewkesbury (1)

== See also ==
- Gloucestershire RFU
- English rugby union system
- Rugby union in England
