= Cheltenham Saracens RFC =

English rugby union club

(England) Cheltenham Saracens RFC
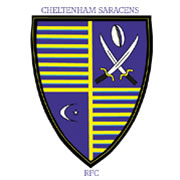
- Full name: Cheltenham Saracens Rugby Football Club
- Union: Gloucestershire RFU
- Nickname: "The Sarries"
- Founded: 1975; 51 years ago
- Location: Cheltenham, Gloucestershire, England
- Ground(s): King George V Playing Field, Brooklyn Road.
- Chairman: (Ireland) Jimmy O'Shea
- President: (England) Roger Harris
- Coach: (England) Gareth Evans
- Captain: (England) James Butler
- Most caps: (Norway) Andrei Hanger
- League: Gloucester Premier
- 2019–20: 8th
Team kit

Official website
- cheltenhamsaracensrugby.com

Cheltenham Saracens RFC is an English rugby union club based in the town of Cheltenham, Gloucestershire, affiliated to Gloucestershire Rugby Football Union. The club's First Team currently play in Gloucester Premier, while their reserve teams play in the Gloucestershire Merit Leagues. The club also runs an under 14's squad. The team practice on the King George V playing fields.

== Club history ==
=== Early years ===
The club was founded in 1975 after Cheltenham Colts Old Boys RFC joined the Cheltenham Saracens Sports Complex, a multi-sports organisation that fielded teams in other sports, such as football and cricket. The original club was based at the multi-sports organisation but played their home matches at King George V Playing Fields in Cheltenham which had previously been used for field hockey. The original kit consisted of blue jerseys with a yellow hoop, black shorts and blue socks, however alternative kits involving a royal blue and yellow quarters as well as black with red hoops on the sleeves were also used during the club's history. The first Chairman of Cheltenham Saracens RFC was Harry Attwood and centre, Tony Pates, was named first captain.

=== Decline and rise ===
Results slowly declined and many players drifted away from the club in search for match time at a higher level, heading to bigger clubs such as Cheltenham Rugby Football Club. After relegation from Gloucester 1 in 2003-04, the club was on the verge of collapse and was offered little support for their umbrella organisation leading to a discussion between those still attached to the club debating whether to leave. Eventually, the decision was made to move the club away from the multi-sports complex, based in the centre of Cheltenham, and after securing a lease from Cheltenham Borough Council, converted the office space above the club's changing rooms into a clubhouse composing of a kitchen, bar, a club lounge area and toilets. The move saw a rise in the club's fortunes as they were crowned league champions of Gloucester 2 in 2010-2012 losing only two matches all season, losing out 12-17 to Old Cryptians and 37-22 to St. Brendan's Old Boys. The Sarries ended up beating Newent RFC by five points, as the club started to attract a new number of players.

The 2011-12 season saw Saracens First XV struggle to adapt to the new standard of rugby as they beat fellow-promoted club Newent 17-3 on the opening day only to lose 30-6 away to Painswick RFC and followed that by a one-point win over Ross-on-Wye RFC, 11-10. The club's results bounced between win and loss until a run of four games undefeated, from January to March, saw them climb to a top half position and remain there despite a few losses close to the end of the season. However the season provided a good stead for the reserve teams with both putting together good form in their respective Merit tables which culminated with the Sarries 2nd XV lifting the Cheltenham Combination Junior Cup for the first time in 20 years as they beat Old Patesians RFC 3rd XV 17-14 after being 0-14 down at half time.

2012-2013 saw the Sarries First XV lose only two matches in the opening months as they ground out small margin wins against seasoned Gloucester 1 clubs. Their promotion efforts were hampered at the start of January with a big loss to eventual league winners Newent RFC and a draw with midtable Old Colstonians saw them drop off the pace. Any chance of promotion was stopped after three losses back to back as the club suffered injuries to a few key players. The reserve teams continued their fine form from the previous season as both teams managed to secure promotion from their Merit leagues and both teams reach the final of the Cheltenham Combination cups but fail to secure any silverware as the Second XV lost out to Old Patesians RFC 3rds in a replay of the previous year and the Third XV lost out to Smiths in the Minor Shield.

The club achieved promotion from Gloucester 1 for the first time in its history in the 2013-2014 season. They maintained their early good form until the start of 2 November, when they lost 13-20 at home to Old Richians rfc. Following this club's form was shaky, but a strong run into the end of the campaign including a 93-0 home win over Kingswood RFC set up a must-win match against fellow promotion chasers Longlevens on the last day of the season. Despite a promising start to the match, Longlevens managed to grab the win 45-38 which saw the Sarries achieve promotion in second behind Bream RFC as they secured two bonus points. The Sarries also performed with their reserve teams as both teams won their respective Merit tables for a second time in a row. The Sarries First XV capitalised on their league performances to capture the Cheltenham Combination Senior Cup for the first time in 30 years, picking up a win over a strong Old Patesians RFC team, however the Sarries reserve teams were unable to secure the Junior Cup or Minor Shield.

The Sarries opened their Gloucester Premier campaign coming out second best against Stroud RFC but picked up a bonus point. Their first home match as a Level 8 club saw them face local rivals Tewkesbury RFC and pick up a 65-5 win. This was followed by two more wins over Forest of Dean clubs Berry Hill RFC and Bream RFC before losing to Whitehall in mid-October, who would eventually go on to secure the playoff place above the Sarries on the last day of the season. The Sarries then went on a long win of runs, not losing a match until 17 January, which saw them go into the New Year's break on top of the league. The club would continue to sit in promotion contention until a 22-22 draw with St. Mary's Old Boys RFC followed by a loss to Stroud on the last day saw Stroud win the league and Whitehall RFC secure the second place as the Sarries finished third in their first season as a level eight club. The Cheltenham Combination Cup saw the Sarries lift the Senior Cup again against the Old Pats. Once again, the reserve teams were unable to add Combination Cup silverware to the Sarries' trophy cabinet.

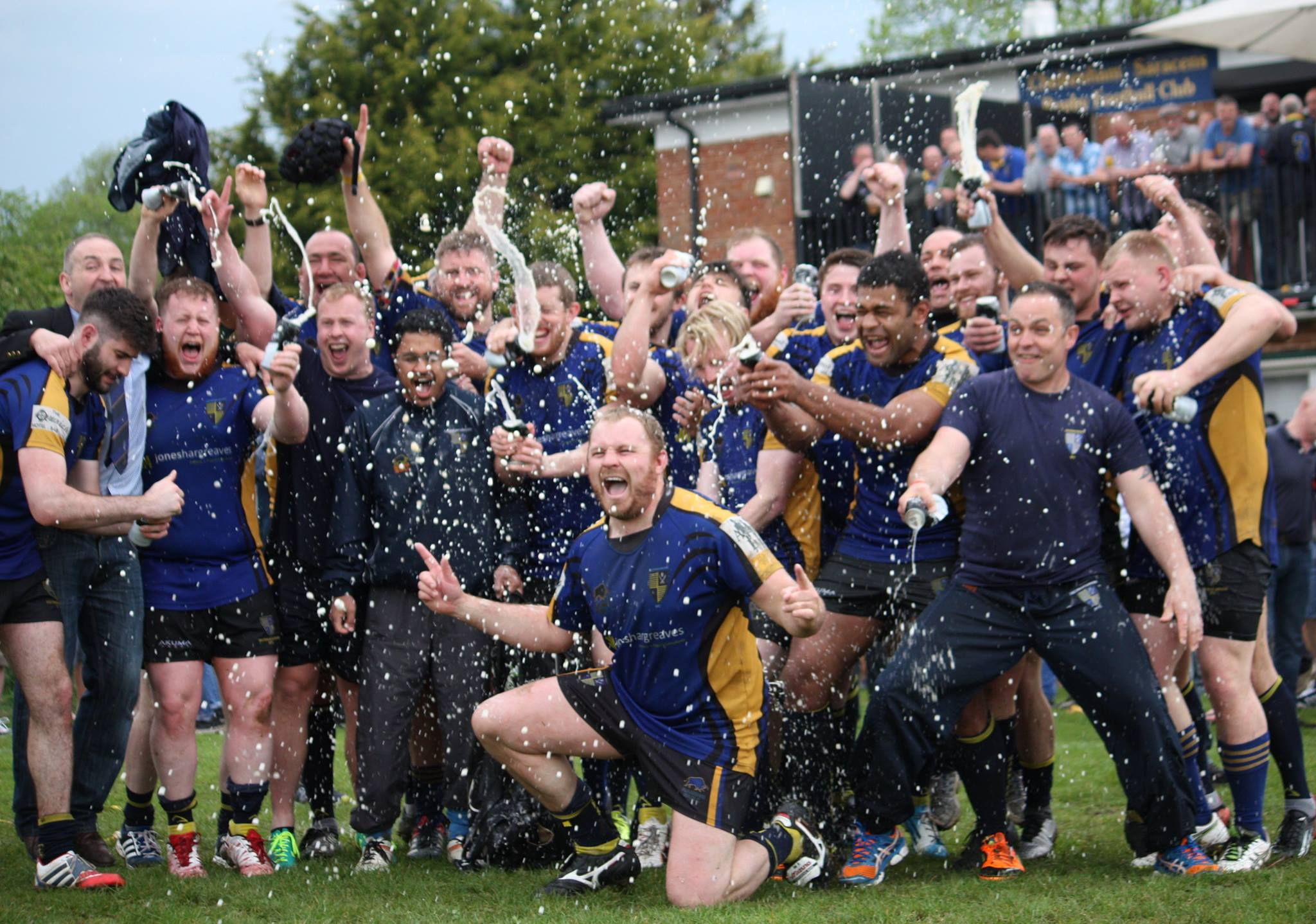
Cheltenham Combination Senior Cup Champions 2016

The St. Mark's based club started their 2015-16 at home against fellow Saracens club, Bristol Saracens. Despite a competitive start, the Bristol side proved too much for the Cheltenham Sarries, eventually running in a 22-53 win. The club's early form was unstable as they bounced between wins and losses which left them sitting midtable before a good run of form from late-October until mid-December saw them push higher up the league. The club's form remained patchy after the New Year's break with a mixed bag of results throughout the early months of 2016. Despite a late fightback, including wins over St. Mary's Old Boys and Cirencester, a 12-10 away loss to league champions Bristol Saracens saw them unable to continue to challenge for promotion. Sarries continued their history-making run, picking up their first ever first team competition win over Cheltenham RFC, winning 21-36 in the Cheltenham Combination Cup Senior Cup first round on 12 April. The club found itself put through to the final following a disagreement on the date of the Combination Senior Cup semi-final with Old Patesians RFC. Saracens advanced to face local rivals Cheltenham North RFC in the final on 7 May, which they would win in dominant fashion 38-14 despite being 0-14 down after five minutes.

The club opened the 2016/17 season with two pre-season trial matches. The first was a loss against Newport Saracens while the second was a win over Beaconsfield. The competitive campaign was launched away at St. Mary's Old Boys RFC in the Gloucestershire Senior Vase quarter final, which saw Saracens lose 12-5. The Gloucester Premier campaign started the following weekend with a victory over Longlevens. This was followed by a dominant win over North Bristol at King George V. The next round of games saw them lose away at Old Richians RFC but they returned to winning ways the next couple of weeks against Barts rugby and Berry Hill. The club was set to host local rivals Cheltenham North RFC on the club's Old Boys Day, but were handed a win as a walkover as the North were unable to field a team. November saw the Sarries travel back to Trench Lane to face St. Mary's Old Boys, coming out on the losing end of a 30-24 result.

== Charity Sevens Tournament ==
In 2013, the club held its first rugby sevens event since becoming independent. The club had previous history of sevens after taking part in the now defunct British Saracens' Sevens.

=== Committee ===
- President: Roger Harris
- Chairman: Eddie Walsh
- Vice Chairman: Jimmy O'Shea
- Club Secretary: John Bradley
- Membership Secretary: Iain bell
- Committee Member: Joe White
- Committee Member: Shaun Meheran
- Committee Member: Russell Thomas Morrison
- Committee Member: Terry Beaver

=== Coaching staff ===
- First Team Manager: Jimmy O'Shea
- Head Coach: James Butler
- Second Team Manager: Adrian Clarke
- Under 14's: Adrian Clarke, Aidan Shearer, Buster Mazoweic, Mark Collier, George Efthymiou.
- Physiotherapist: Edmore Moyo

== Club honours ==
Gloucester 1:

- Runner-up: 2013-2014

Gloucester 2:

- Winners (2): 2002-2003, 2010-2011

Cheltenham Combination Senior Cup:

- Winners (5): 1974*, 1984, 2014, 2015, 2016

*As Cheltenham Colts Old Boys RFC

Cheltenham Combination Junior Cup:

- Winners (3): 1982, 1990, 2012
- Runner-up: 2013

Cheltenham Combination Minor Shield:

- Runner-up: 2013

== Notable former players ==
- (England) Tony Pates
- (England) Timmy Pates
- (Ireland) Sylvie Donoghue
- (Norway) Andrei Hanger
- (England) Eddie Walsh
- (England) Terry Beaver
- (Ireland) Jimmy O'Shea
- (Italy) Fabio Nicosia
- (England) Nick Hanby
