= Gipsy Patch Lane Bridge =

Railway bridge in South Gloucestershire, England

- Coordinates: 51°31′21.34″N 2°33′40.13″W
- Carries: South Wales Main Line
- Crosses: B4057 Gipsy Patch Lane

History
- Rebuilt: 2020

Gipsy Patch Lane Bridge is a bridge in Little Stoke, Bristol, England, built in 2020.

== Background ==
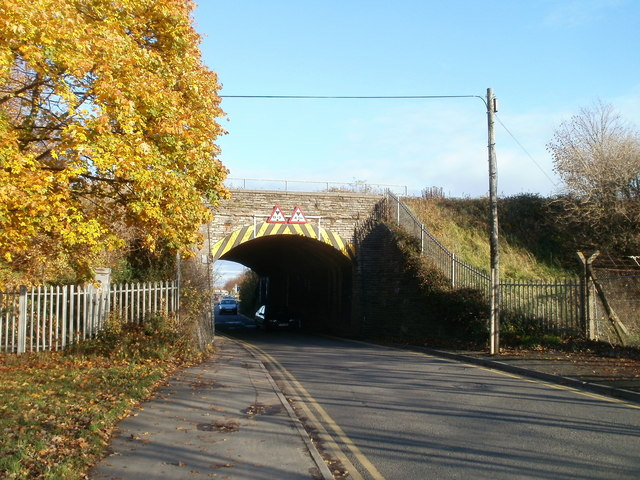
The original bridge in 2010

The Bristol and South Wales Union Railway, opened in 1863, was built through the Patchway area north of the city. About a quarter of a mile south of Patchway station, Gipsy Patch Lane (now the B4047) passed through the railway embankment via an arched underbridge built in dark brick. The bridge had a height clearance of 4 metres (13 feet) and was wide enough to accommodate one traffic lane in each direction and a pavement on one side.

It was replaced with a wider concrete bridge in 2020, as part of the city-wide MetroBus project. At 24 metres (79 ft) wide, the new bridge is approximately 10 metres (33 ft) wider than the original bridge and thus can accommodate in each direction a traffic lane, a bus lane and a pavement. To allow the use of double-decker buses on the new MetroBus m4 route, the road was lowered by 1.7 metres (5.6 feet).

== Reconstruction ==
Gipsy Patch Lane closed in March 2020 to allow the bridge to be replaced. The bridge was originally planned to be installed over Easter but work was delayed by the COVID-19 pandemic. Following news of the delay, a route for pedestrians and cyclists under the bridge was restored in April 2020.

The new 4,260-tonne bridge was constructed on site near the original bridge. The original bridge was demolished on 27 October 2020. The operation to move the new bridge into place began the following day. However, the transporters carrying it became stuck in mud 30 metres (98 ft) short of the desired location. The bridge was eventually moved into position on 14 November and the railway was reopened on 23 November, 16 days later than planned.

In November 2021, Gipsy Patch Lane reopened to westbound traffic. The road reopened to traffic in both directions on 24 April 2022.
