= Little Stoke =

Village in England

Coordinates: 51.524°N 2.560°W

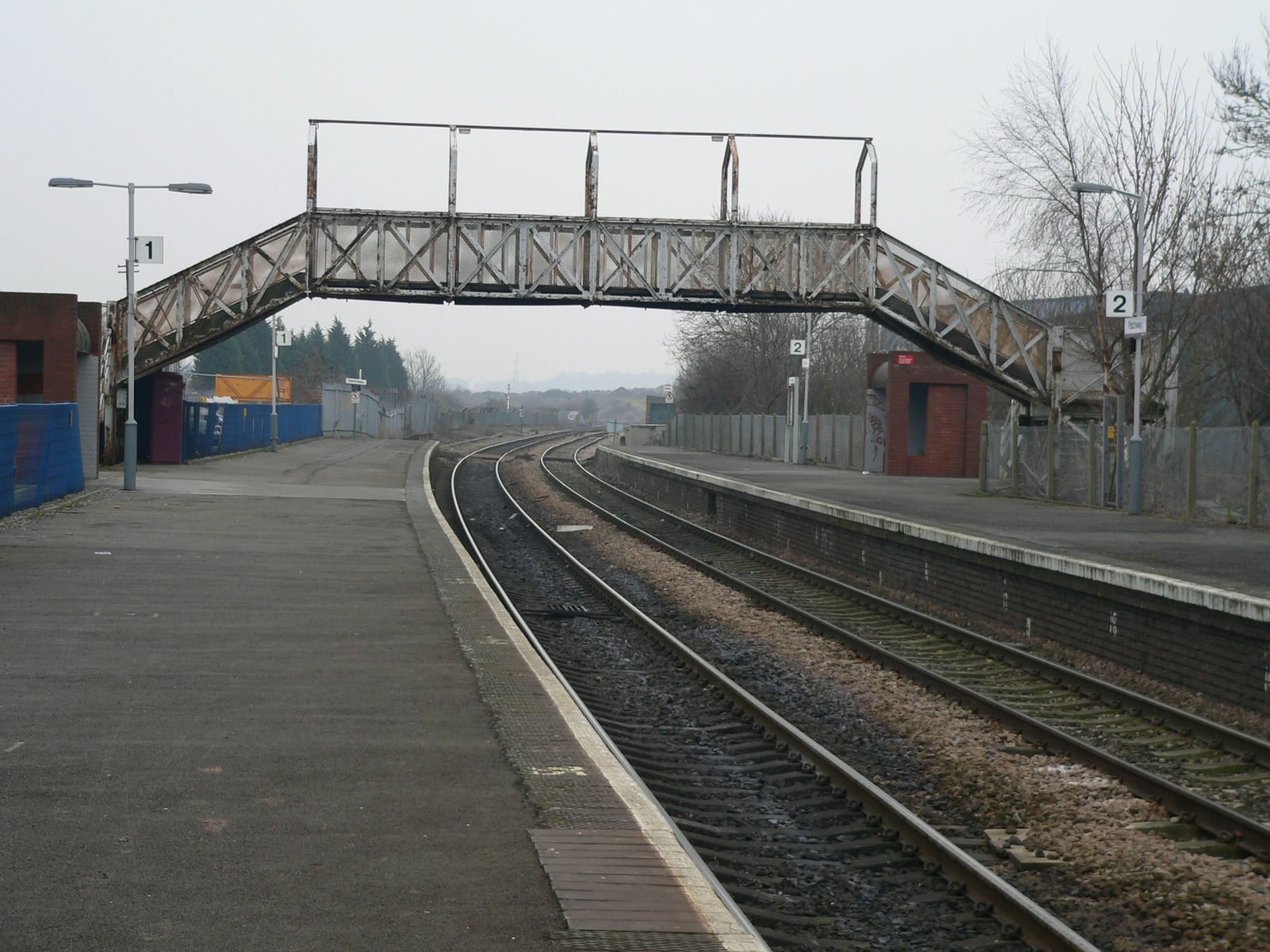
Patchway railway station.

Little Stoke is a village in the parish of Stoke Gifford, in the North Fringe of Bristol, South Gloucestershire, England. It is surrounded by Patchway, Stoke Gifford and Bradley Stoke. Home to Patchway railway station, a minor stop on the railway network, the railway line separates Little Stoke from the large Rolls-Royce factories in nearby Filton. Gipsy Patch Lane Bridge provides access under the line.

Little Stoke is home to a large playing field and a community hall. The community hall is now home to a café - 'Little Stoke Community Cafe'. Near the railway arch are some local shops including a post office.

Many of the road names are linked to engines produced in the 1950s and 1960s at what is now the Rolls-Royce factory. The area originally consisted of many council houses and post World War II prefabs. In recent years, some of the houses have been renovated; however, some owners have kept the older style of house.

Little Stoke has one Public House, The Stokers (formally The Magpies), on Gipsy Patch Lane, and one Social Club (Little Stoke Social Club), on Braydon Avenue.

School children attend Little Stoke Primary School and then move on to AbbeyWood High School, on New Road in nearby Filton; or to the nearby Patchway High School. Some pupils travel further afield to Bradley Stoke Community School in Bradley Stoke The Ridings High School in Winterbourne or to The Castle School or Marlwood School (in Thornbury and Alveston respectively).

Stoke Gifford Parish Council gained notoriety amongst the running world when it became the first council to vote to impose a charge on runners who run at Little Stoke parkrun every Saturday morning. parkrun organises free running events in over 800 parks worldwide and this was the first and only council to take this step when it made its decision on 12 April 2016 by a vote of 6 to 4. The Parish Council cited wear and tear on paths as its justification. Because of this, Little Stoke parkrun has now closed.

Little Stoke has a football team called Stokeside FC who play in the Bristol & District League as well as Little Stoke F.C who currently play in the Gloucestershire County League and Stoke Lane, which gets its name from the road Stoke Lane, which runs through Little Stoke. The club's home shirt for all the teams is black and white stripes.

Martin Davis, who lived at Little Stoke Farm, has published a book about local history: The Farmer and the Goose with the Golden Eyes: A Celebration of a Vanished Part of Rural South Gloucestershire and the Founding of the Wildfowl and Wetlands Trust at Slimbridge.
