= Speedwell, Bristol =

Coordinates: 51.4682°N 2.5268°W

Speedwell
- Location within Bristol
- Population: 2,342
- OS grid reference: ST635745
- Unitary authority: Bristol
- Ceremonial county: Bristol
- Region: South West
- Country: England
- Sovereign state: United Kingdom
- Post town: BRISTOL
- Postcode district: BS5, BS15
- Dialling code: 0117
- Police: Avon and Somerset
- Fire: Avon
- Ambulance: South Western
- UK Parliament: Bristol North East

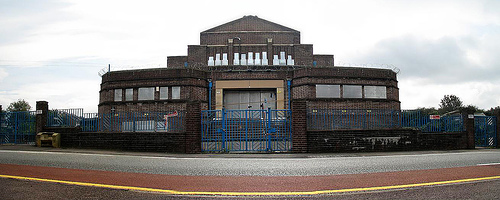
Speedwell Swimming Baths (after closure)

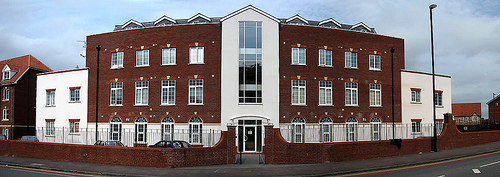
New housing on the site of the TA barracks, Whitefield Road

Speedwell is an area of east Bristol, Part of the Hillfields ward, it has a mixture of residential and industrial land.

The 2014 population estimate of the population of Speedwell was 2,342.

The one school in the area is Bristol Brunel Academy, previously known as Speedwell Technology College and Speedwell Secondary School. It was Bristol's first specialist school - a technology college since 1997. In 2007 the academy moved into all-new purpose built buildings and the old school buildings were demolished.

== History ==
The Speedwell area had many small coal mines in the 19th century. In the 1970s some of these old workings had to be stabilised in the area of Speedwell Secondary School. A goods only railway connected the collieries and the Peckett and Sons locomotive works (also known as the Atlas Locomotive Works) with the Midland railway at Kingswood junction. In the early 1970s, shortly after Avon county council was formed, approximately half of Speedwell Secondary School burned down. The school was partly rebuilt.

A number of 'temporary' prefab houses, built in the housing shortage after World War II, existed in the west side of the suburb into the 21st century.

Speedwell is the location of two of the three tower blocks located in the outer eastern suburbs of Bristol: Roegate house is an 11 story block of 83 flats built in the mid-1960s, and the other is the 10 story office block formerly used by Strachan & Henshaw.
