= Old Patesians R.F.C. =

English amateur rugby (union & league) club

Old Patesians RFC
- Full name: Old Patesians Rugby Football Club
- Union: Gloucestershire RFU
- Nickname: Old Pats
- Founded: 1913; 113 years ago
- Location: Cheltenham, Gloucestershire, England
- CEO: Matthew Cape
- Coach: Ben Smith
- Captain: Sam Rhymes
- League: Counties 2 Gloucestershire North
- 2023–24: 2nd
Team kit

Official website
- www.oldpats.co.uk

Old Patesians Rugby Football Club is a rugby union club based in Cheltenham, Gloucestershire. The club currently play in Counties 2 Gloucestershire North following their voluntary relegation from Regional 2 Severn. As well as the first XV, the club operate two other male teams, a junior programme, with teams starting from under-9, through to under-19 (Colts) level. The club runs a rugby league side under the name, Cheltenham Old Patesians, which play in the West of England Rugby League.

== History ==
The club was founded in 1913 by former pupils of Pate's Grammar School, where the game of rugby union had been played since 1906, hence the name "Old Patesians". The Old Patesians Association was formed in 1947. The club's motto is taken from Richard Pate's tomb, which is located in nearby Gloucester Cathedral. It reads, Patebit tum quod latuit (Latin) meaning, "What is hidden will be revealed." In January 2006 a Ladies side was created and they are now playing regularly in the Spirit of Game development league.

The club obtained its present home ground at Everest Road, Cheltenham in 1975; putting an end to the club's wanderings.

With the introduction of league rugby in 1987, the Old Pats were placed in Gloucestershire One. They were winners of Gloucestershire One in 1991–92 and then the Gloucestershire/Somerset League in 1992–93, they were then winners of the Western Counties League in 1993–94. The success continued in 1997–98 when the club were South West Two (West) League winners. The Old Pats, under a new coaching team, won South West One League in 2000–01 on the final Saturday of the season on points difference as well winning the Intermediate Cup at Twickenham by one point to Blaydon, and lost to Cinderford RFC by a narrow margin in the Gloucestershire Cup final. The juniors won the under-17 County Cup final.

In their first season in the National leagues in 2001–02, after taking a couple of games to find their feet, the Pats finished 5th. The club narrowly avoid relegation in 2005–06 but did win the Cheltenham Combination Cup for the fifth year in a row.

The club established a competitive women's side and affiliated to the RFUW in 2006–07. The club were relegated from the National leagues and lost the Cheltenham Combination Cup to Cheltenham.

In 2013, the club ran a rugby league side under the name, Cheltenham Old Patesians, which took part in the West of England Rugby League.

The club were promoted to South West Premier in 2018-19 but were relegated the same season.

== Honours ==
- Gloucester 1 champions: 1991–92
- Gloucestershire/Somerset champions: 1992–93
- Western Counties champions: 1993–94
- South West 2 champions: 1997–98
- South West 1 champions: 2001–02
- RFU Intermediate Cup at Twickenham winners: 2001–02
- West of England Rugby League winners: 2013
- South West 1 East champions: 2017–18
