= Prince of Wales Stadium =

Sports venue in Cheltenham, England

- Interactive map of Prince of Wales Stadium
- Full name: The Prince of Wales Stadium
- Location: Tommy Taylors Lane, Cheltenham, Gloucestershire; GL50 4RN
- Coordinates: 51°54′39″N 2°4′50″W
- Capacity: 3,500 (500 seats)
- Surface: Grass

Construction
- Built: 1981
- Opened: 1981
- Renovated: 1999

Tenant
- Gloucestershire All Golds Smiths Rugby Club

The Prince of Wales Stadium is a multi-sport stadium in Cheltenham, Gloucestershire, England, with a running track and athletics facilities. Since 2014, the stadium has been owned and managed by The Cheltenham Trust.

The stadium is home to Smiths Rugby Club which uses the ground for training and home games. It is also home to Cheltenham & County Harriers.

The Cheltenham Rugby Festival rugby league nines event has also been held there.

== History ==
The Prince of Wales Stadium was opened in 1981. A cricket match between Australia and Gloucestershire was played as part of its opening.

In September 1981, Cheltenham Tigers Rugby Football Club moved to the stadium. They played a match against Harlequins to celebrate the occasion.

The track was reopened on 2 October 1999 after the track surface had been resurfaced with Polytan PUR at a cost of £185,000. In 2014, the stadium became part of The Cheltenham Trust, a charity which manages several properties which were formerly run by Cheltenham Borough Council.
