= Norton, Gloucestershire =

Civil parish in Gloucestershire, England

Coordinates: 51.915402°N 2.210343°W

Norton
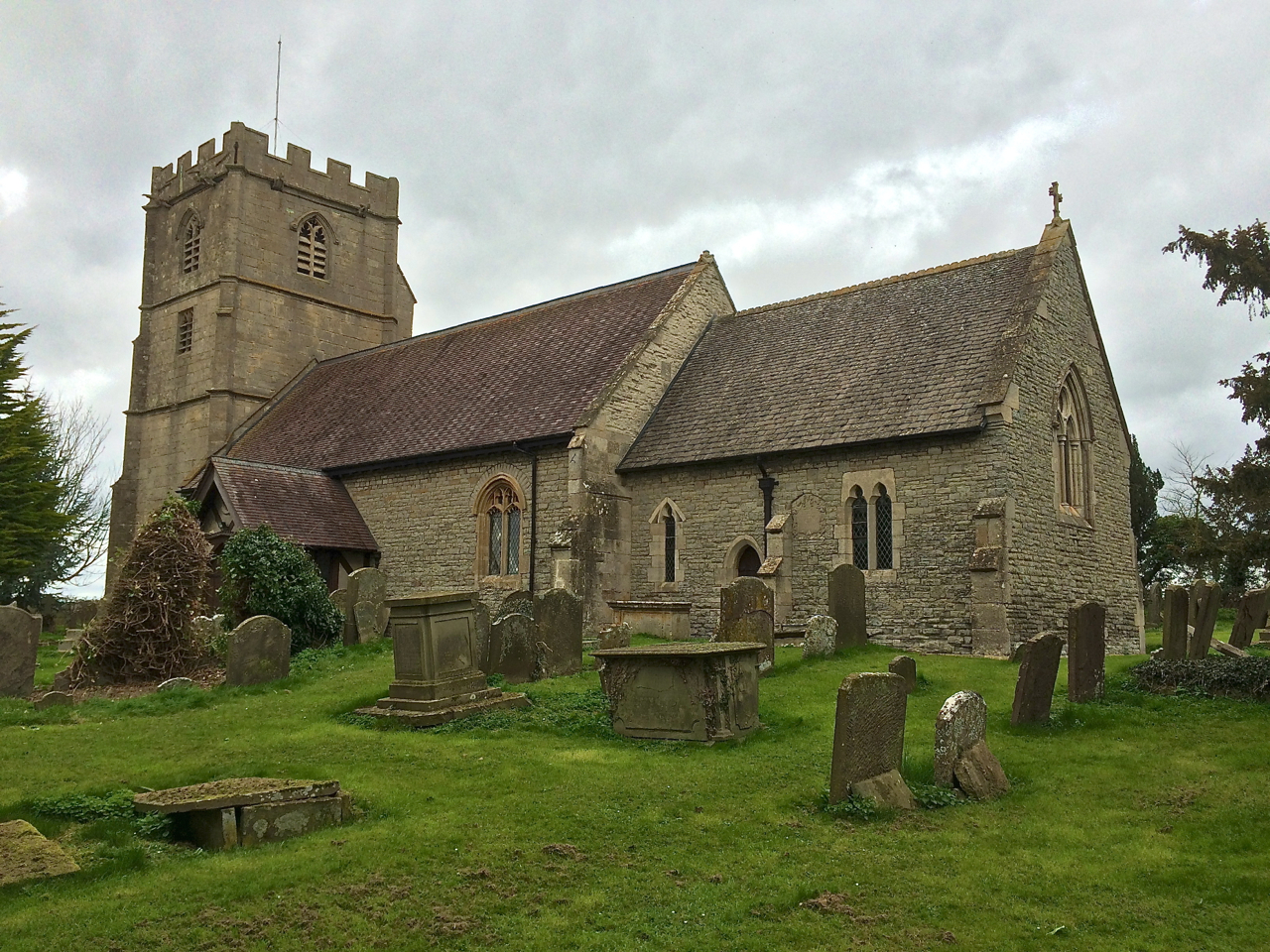
- St Mary's Church, Prior's Norton, Gloucestershire

- Location within Gloucestershire
- Population: 439
- OS grid reference: SO856241
- Civil parish: Norton
- District: Tewkesbury
- Shire county: Gloucestershire
- Region: South West
- Country: England
- Sovereign state: United Kingdom
- Post town: Gloucester
- Postcode district: GL2
- Dialling code: 01452
- Police: Gloucestershire
- Fire: Gloucestershire
- Ambulance: South Western
- UK Parliament: Tewkesbury

Norton is a settlement and civil parish in the Tewkesbury district, in the county of Gloucestershire, England.

== Overview ==
The main settlements in the parish are the three hamlets of Norton (sometimes called Cold Elm Norton), Bishop's Norton and Prior's Norton.

The parish is bisected by the main A38 road that connects Gloucester and Tewkesbury, Bishop's Norton lying to its west and Prior's Norton to its east. Norton formerly lay on the road but is now bypassed. For the purposes of local government the parish forms part of the Tewkesbury borough

The village has a small school (Norton Church of England Primary School), a village hall, a sports pitch, two pubs (The Red Lion at Wainlode Hill and the New Dawn Inn) and a church.

The parish of Norton had a population of 439 according to the 2011 census.

On the Bishop's Norton side, just down from the trigpoint at the top of Sandhurst Hill, is a commemoration stone in the middle of a small group of trees with the following inscription: "This stone marks the site of the bonfire lit to commemorate the coronation of King George V, June 22nd 1911".

== Governance ==
Norton falls in 'Coombe Hill' electoral ward. This ward stretches from Deerhurst in the north to the edge of Gloucester. The total ward population taken at the 2011 census was 4,545.
