= 1955–56 Rugby Union County Championship =

English rugby union competition

1955–56 County Championship
- Countries: England
- Champions: Middlesex (4th title)
- Runners-up: Devon

The 1955–56 Rugby Union County Championship was the 56th edition of England's premier rugby union club competition at the time.

Middlesex won the competition for the fourth time after defeating Devon in the final.

== Final ==
10 March 1956

Middlesex	13–9	Devon
Try: Woodward, Roberts; Con: Elgie (2); Pen: Elgie		Pen: Glastonbury (3)

Twickenham
Referee: L H Boundy (Hertfordshire)

J J Gardner	Harlequins
Ted Woodward	Wasps
Jim Roberts	Old Millhillians
A Cormack	St Mary's Hospital
Doug Baker	Harlequins
M K Elgie	London Scottish
Johnny Williams	Old Millhillians
John Leleu	London Welsh
R Boggon	Richmond
Peter Ryan	Richmond
Victor Harding	Saracens
Peter Yarranton (capt)	Wasps & R.A.F
Gordon Bendon	Wasps
Nick Labuschagne	Harlequins
M J O Massey	St Mary's Hospital

C T Bowen	Newton Abbot
W Blackmore	Exeter
W J Glastonbury	Plymouth Albion
G Williams	St Lukes College
J L Stark	Barnstaple
B E Jones	St Lukes College
D B Rees	St Lukes College
S Foster	Torquay Athletic
Dick Manley	Exeter
F A Prosser	Devonport Services
W L Copley	Devonport Services
R L Ellis	Plymouth Albion
Derrick Main	St Lukes College
S Baker	Sidmouth
G E R Ridd (capt)	St Lukes College

== See also ==
- English rugby union system
- Rugby union in England
