= Newton Abbot RFC =

English rugby union club, based in Devon, England

Newton Abbot Rugby Club
- Full name: Newton Abbot Rugby Club
- Union: Devon RFU
- Founded: 1878; 148 years ago
- Location: Kingsteignton, Newton Abbot, Devon, England
- Ground: Rackerhayes (Capacity: 1,150 (150 stand))
- Chairman: Mark Shaddick
- President: Brian Pilkington
- League: Regional 2 South West
- 2024–25: 12th (relegated to Counties 1 Western West)
Team kit

Official website
- narfc.co.uk

Newton Abbot Rugby Club is an English rugby union team based the town of Kingsteignton, just outside of Newton Abbot in Devon. The club runs two senior teams and a ladies side as well as the full range of junior teams. The first XV play in Counties 1 Western West, a level seven league in the English rugby union system, following their relegation from Regional 2 South West at the end of the 2024–25 season.

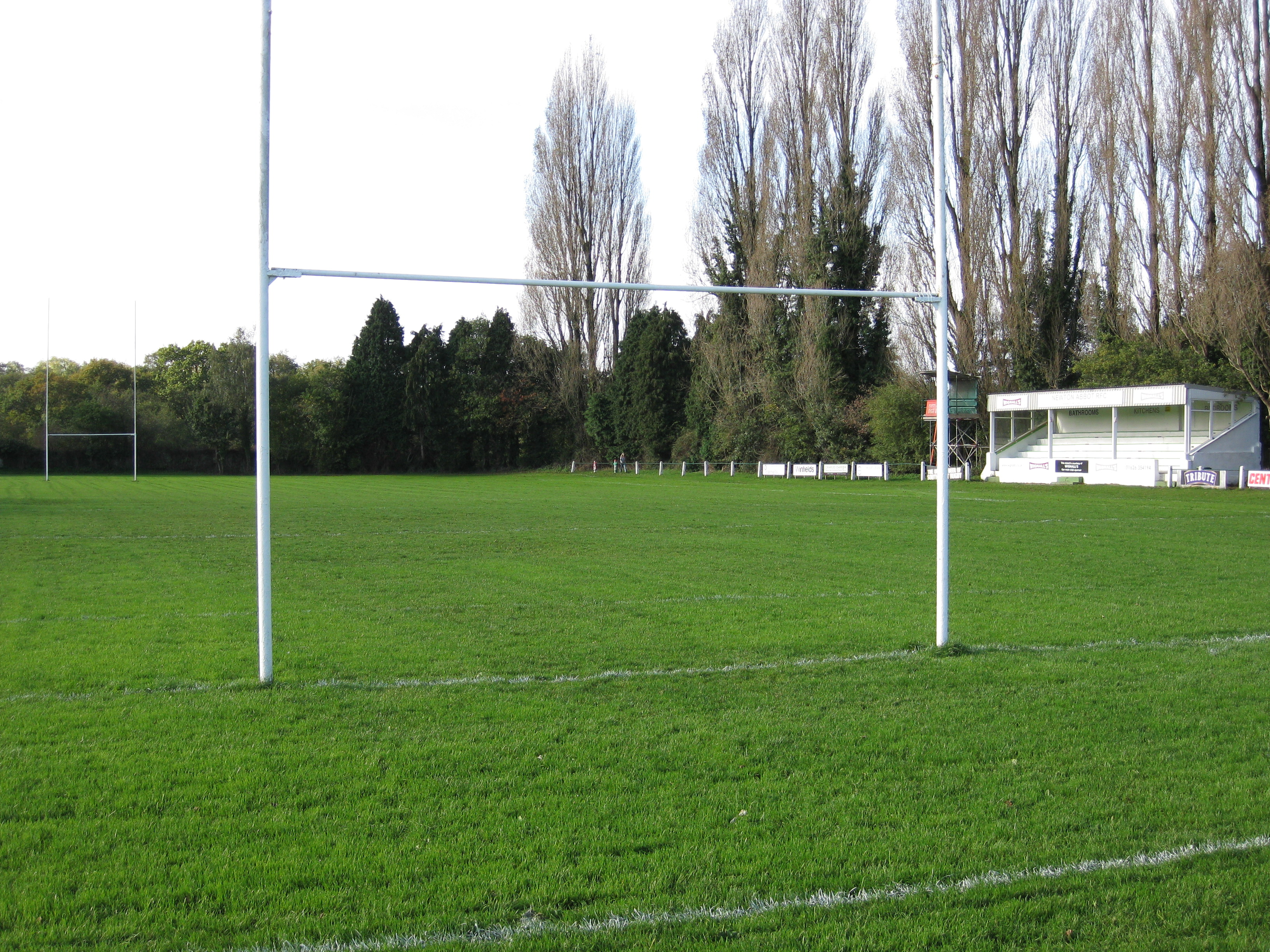
View of main pitch and stand at Rackerhayes, home of Newton Abbot RFC

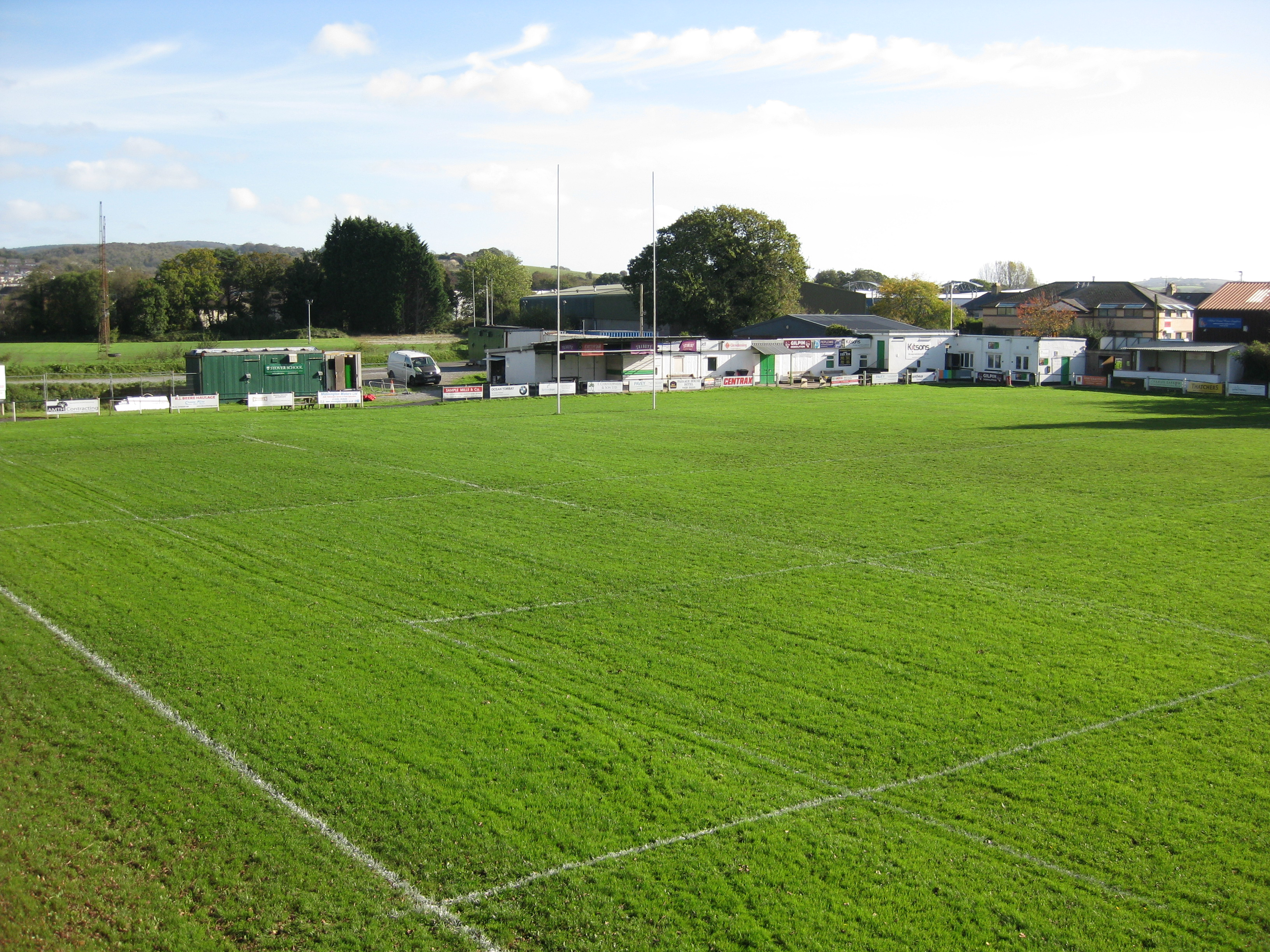
View of Newton Abbot RFC club house at Rackerhayes

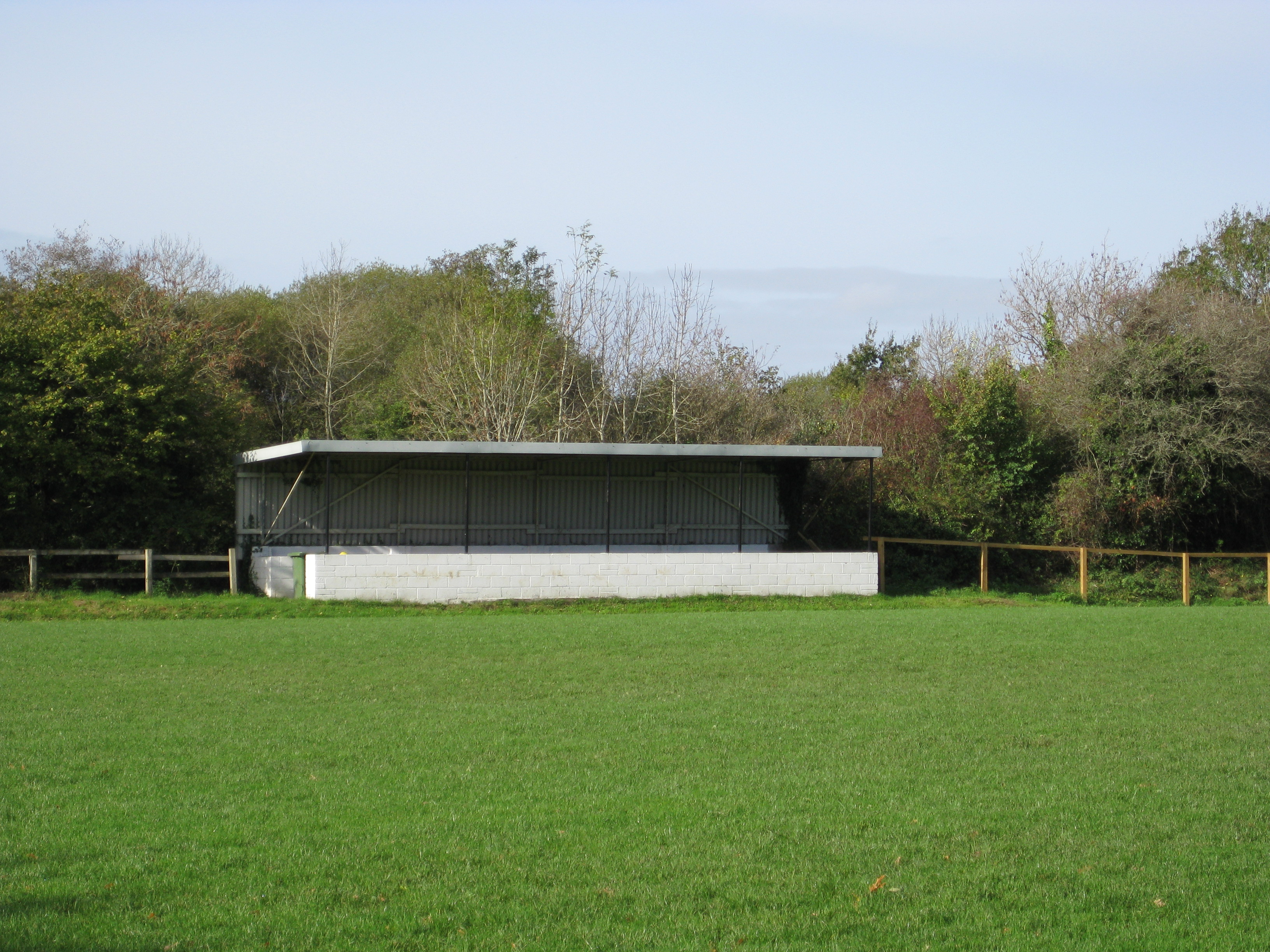
Covered stand alongside one of the training pitches at Rackerhayes

== Background/History ==
=== Early history ===
The rugby club of the Newton Rifle Volunteers, commonly known as Newton Rifles, changed its name to Newton Abbot RFC in 1886. That year's annual supper recalled how the club had been formed after Rev George Townsend Warner had invited the volunteers to play football after the annual shooting matches. This earlier event took place on 18 November 1878. The club was the third in Newton after Newton College (who changed from Association to Rugby in 1875) and the recently formed GWR club. The Volunteers' first reported match against another club took place on 25 January 1879. During the early years of the club the kit changed from green and red hoops to red, white and amber in 1897, before settling with an all white kit in 1903, thus earning the nickname of 'All Whites'. This period is also notable for the two Newton players who gained international caps for England while at the club, full-back Henry Tristram who was capped in 1887 and forward Denys Dobson who was capped in 1902. To date these are the only Newton Abbot players who have received international caps with England.

Prior to World War II the club had the distinction of hosting some of the top international sides on their tours of the country, including the New Zealand All Blacks in 1905, 1924 and 1935, the South African Springboks in 1907, and Australia in 1908. Indeed, it was during their time at Newton Abbot that the Australian team gave themselves the nickname of the 'Wallabies' following questioning from a local reporter. On the pitch the 1920s were one of the most successful in the club's history, winning the Devon Senior Cup for the first time in 1923, reclaiming it in 1924 before going on to claim a third title in 1927. The reserve side also did well, winning the Devon Junior Cup in 1921 and 1925. Although the club had some good seasons in the 1950s and 1960s the glory years were behind them and by the advent of league rugby the club was on the decline.

=== League rugby ===
The advent of league rugby in 1987 saw Newton Abbot placed in Cornwall/Devon – a tier 8 league in the English rugby union system. Their debut season in the leagues was one to forget as the club finished in bottom spot with 10 losses from 10 games played and were relegated to Devon League 1. Although relegation was disappointing, the club started to rebuild and by 1990 they had won their first county silverware since the 1920s, claiming the Havill Plate. Newton spent the next decade in Devon League 1, until after three seasons spent as runners up the club finally gained promotion as champions at the end of 1997–98.

Success was quick to follow the very next season as Newton made it two promotions in a row at the end of 1998–99, this time winning Cornwall/Devon ahead of runners-up Withycombe and gaining promotion to Western Counties West. In 2004 the club won their first Devon Senior Cup since 1927, defeating Brixham 33–31 in an exciting final at Astley Park. The 2005–06 season saw Newton finish second in the league behind Torquay Athletic, qualifying for a promotion playoff against the runners up from Tribute Western Counties North. Due to a stronger league performance, Newton Abbot were granted home advantage, and they made it count by sealing a 24–12 victory over Walcot at Rackerhayes. Also of interest during this period was the formation in Newton Abbot of rugby league side Devon Sharks in 2005. The Sharks played home games at Rackerhayes until 2008 when they moved to a purpose-built ground in Torquay.

The 2008–09 season saw Newton Abbot once more compete for promotion, fighting their way to a second-place finish, some way adrift of champions Taunton Titans who won all their games. As runners up the club found themselves with a second stab at promotion, heading east to take on South West 2 East runners-up, Reading, but ultimately ending up disappointed as they went down 10–16 at Holme Park. The following season Newton Abbot were once more in with a shout with promotion in what had been re-branded Tribute South West 1 after the RFU had re-organized the league structure. As with the previous season the club once again finished well behind the league champions, this time in the form of Hartpury College, who like Taunton finished unbeaten, winning all their games. Despite finishing 10 points behind Hartpury, Newton still did enough to secure home advantage for the promotion play-off. Once again Rackerhayes was the scene of a second home victory in the play-offs as Newton went on to beat High Wycombe 23–14 to seal promotion to National League 3 South West – the highest level the club had reached in its history.

== Ground ==
The club originally played at Teign Marshes where the Racecourse now stands. In 1897, they moved to the Recreation Ground which would be their home for fifty years. In 1947, Newton Abbot Spurs AFC outbid the rugby club for the lease on the Rec forcing NARFC to move to Rackerhayes. The Rackerhayes rugby ground is on the edge of an industrial estate, on southern the outskirts of Kingsteignton, near the Newton Abbot Racecourse, and about 2 miles walk from the town of Newton Abbot. The rugby ground consists of three pitches including two training pitches and backs on to the Rackerhayes fishing complex. The main pitch is next to the club house and has standing capacity for approximately 1,000 spectators including a couple of small covered standing areas. There is also a covered stand with seating for around 150 people, making the overall capacity of Rackerhayes about 1,150. In-ground parking is available next to the club-house, with additional parking in the surrounding industrial estate.

One of the two training pitches has a covered stand for standing spectators. Both training pitches are of decent quality. Reserve and youth fixtures are fulfilled on these pitches.

== Season summary ==
Season	League			National Cup(s)		County Cup(s)	
Season	Competition/Level	Position	Points	Competition	Performance	Competition	Performance
1987–88	Cornwall/Devon (8)	11th (relegated)	0				
1988–89	Devon League 1 (9)						
1989–90	Devon League 1 (9)					Havill Plate	Winners
1990–91	Devon League 1 (9)						
1991–92	Devon League 1 (9)						
1992–93	Devon League 1 (9)						
1993–94	Devon League 1 (10) (Note: RFU restructuring due to creating of Courage League Division 5 meant that Devon League 1 became a tier 10 league.)	2nd					
1994–95	Devon League 1 (10)	2nd					
1995–96	Devon League 1 (10)					Havill Plate	Runners up
1996–97	Devon League 1 (9) (Note: The cancellation of Courage League Division 5 at the end of the 1995–96 season meant that Devon League 1 once again became a tier 9 league.)	2nd				Devon Junior Cup	Runners up
1997–98	Devon League 1 (9)	1st (promoted)					
1998–99	Cornwall/Devon (8)	1st (promoted)	30				
1999–00	Western Counties West (7)	3rd	23				
2000–01	Western Counties West (7)	5th	20				
2001–02	Western Counties West (7)	6th	22				
2002–03	Western Counties West (7)	8th	20	Powergen Intermediate Cup	5th Round		
2003–04	Western Counties West (7)	4th	27	Powergen Intermediate Cup	1st Round	Devon Senior Cup	Winners
2004–05	Western Counties West (7)	3rd	38	Powergen Cup	Preliminary Round		
2005–06	Western Counties West (7)	2nd (promoted via playoff)	35	Powergen Intermediate Cup	3rd or 4th Round (Note: Newton Abbot reached at least the 3rd Round of the 2005–06 Powergen Intermediate Cup. They may have reached the 4th Round but due to poor press reporting there is no mention of any 4th Round fixtures from this season. What is certain is that they went out before the 5th Round as they are not listed in that draw.)		
2006–07	South West 2 West (6)	5th	26	EDF Energy Intermediate Cup	Quarter-finals		
2007–08	South West 2 West (6)	5th	21	EDF Energy Intermediate Cup	2nd Round		
2008–09	South West 2 West (6)	2nd (lost playoff)	36	EDF Energy Intermediate Cup	3rd Round		
2009–10	South West 1 West (6) (Note: South West 2 West was renamed as South West 1 West for the 2009–10 season.)	2nd (promoted via playoff)	42				
2010–11	National 3 South West (5)	6th	75 (Note: The 2010–11 season be the first in which Newton Abbot would use bonus points having been introduced to tier 5 from the 2009–10 season onward.)			Devon Senior Cup	Runners up
2011–12	National 3 South West (5)	7th	62			Devon Senior Cup	1st Round
2012–13	National 3 South West (5)	4th	90			Devon Senior Cup	Semi-finals
2013–14	National 3 South West (5)	4th	75			Devon Senior Cup	Runners up
2014–15	National 3 South West (5)	7th	64			Devon Senior Cup	Runners up
2015–16	National 3 South West (5)	11th	53			Devon Senior Cup	1st Round
2016–17	National 3 South West (5)	4th	75			Devon Senior Cup	Quarter-finals
2017–18	South West Premier (5) (Note: National League 3 South West would be renamed to South West Premier for the 2017–18 season.)	4th	71			Devon Senior Cup	1st Round
2018–19	South West Premier (5)	13th (relegated)	35			Devon Senior Cup	6th
2019–20	South West 1 West (6)	13th (relegated)	20.40 (Note: The season was postponed and ultimately cancelled due to the COVID-19 pandemic in the United Kingdom with Newton Abbott sitting in 13th, having played 20 games and gained 17 points. The remaining games were calculated on a 'best playing record formula', with Newton remaining in 13th place with 20.40 points.)			Devon Senior Shield	
2020–21	Western Counties West (7)						
Green background stands for either league champions (with promotion) or cup winners. Blue background stands for promotion without winning league or losing cup finalists. Pink background stands for relegation.

== Honours ==
- Devon Junior Cup winners (2): 1921, 1925 (both won by reserve side)
- Devon Senior Cup champions (4): 1923, 1924, 1927, 2004
- Havill Plate winners: 1990
- Devon League 1 champions: 1997–98
- Cornwall & Devon champions: 1998–99
- Tribute Western Counties (north v west) promotion play-off winners: 2005–06
- South West 1 (east v west) promotion play-off winners: 2009–10

== Notable players ==
- Denys Dobson - Forward who would go on to gain six caps for England during the 1902–03 season while playing at the club. Also made four appearances for the British and Irish Lions during their 1904 tour of Australia.
- Henry Tristram - Full-back who was capped by England while playing at the club in 1887 - one of the five caps he would make for his country. As well as playing rugby union he was also a first-class cricketer who appeared for both Durham County Cricket Club and Oxford University.
- Lewis Bradley - Wing who was capped by England deaf in 2026 in a test match against the Jamaican women national side were they lost 36-33.
