= Exmouth RFC =

English rugby union team, based in Devon

Exmouth
- Full name: Exmouth Rugby Football Club
- Union: Devon RFU
- Nickname: Cockles
- Founded: 1873; 153 years ago
- Location: Exmouth, Devon, England
- Ground: Imperial Recreation Ground (Capacity: 1,250 (250 stand))
- Chairman: John Justice
- President: Chris Parks
- Director of Rugby: Stu Lowe
- Coach: Matt Postlethwaite
- Captain: Dave Bargent
- League: Regional 1 South West
- 2025–26: 4th
Team kit

Official website
- www.exmouthrugby.co.uk

Exmouth Rugby Football Club is a rugby union team based at the Imperial Recreation Ground in Exmouth, Devon. The club runs four senior teams and a ladies side as well as the full range of junior boys teams and girls teams at three age levels. The first XV plays in the Regional 1 South West, the fifth tier of the English rugby union league system.

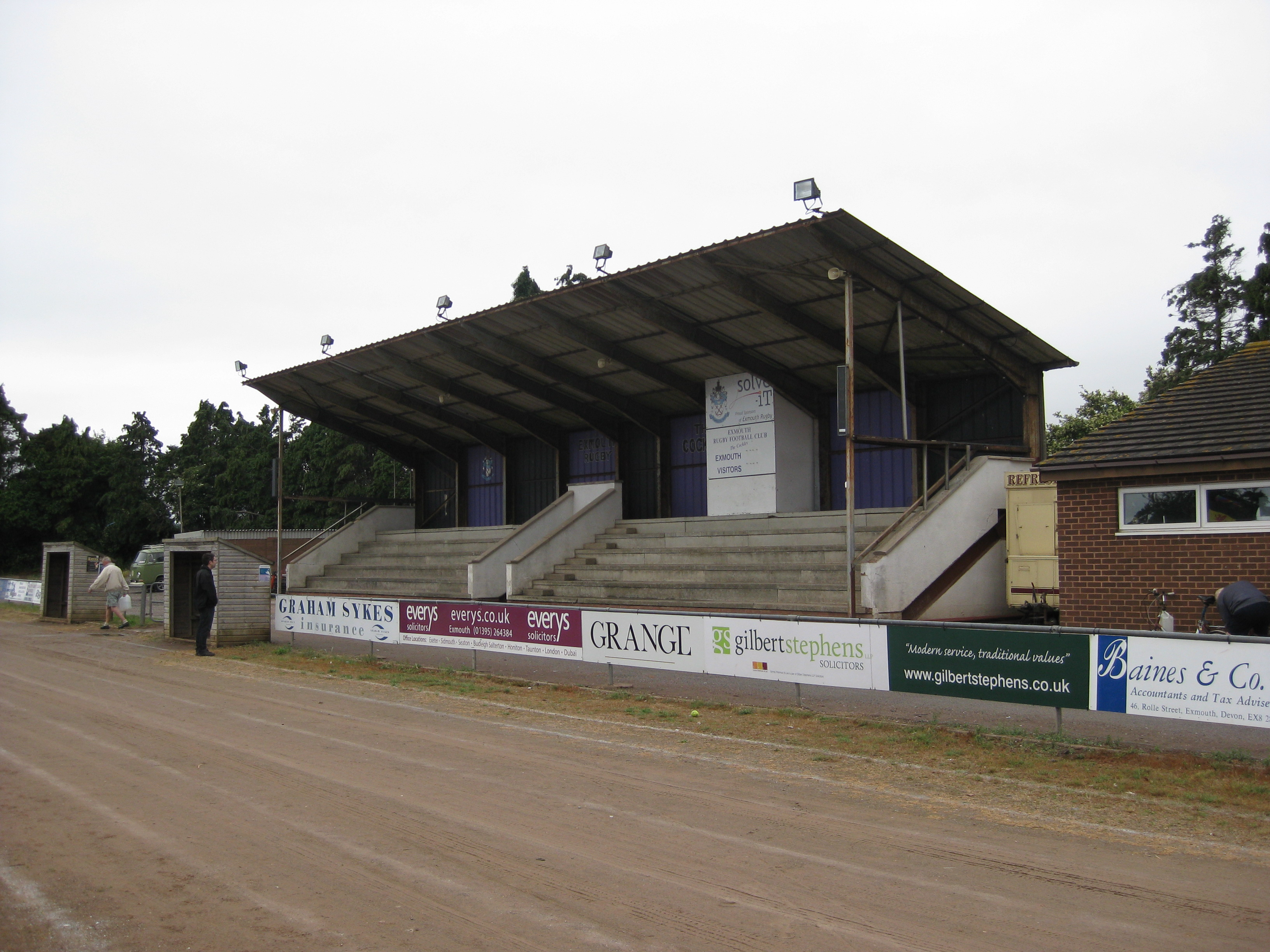
The stand at Exmouth RFC Imperial Recreation Ground

== History ==
Exmouth RFC was formed in 1873 and, along with clubs such as Barnstaple and Exeter, were instrumental in promoting the game of rugby union in Devon. Early games were played at Exmouth Cricket Ground and then Littleham Lane, until the club moved to more permanent lodgings at Archery Field (Cranford), where they would remain for the next 70 years. The club had some difficult times in its infancy, almost fading from existence in the early 20th century and having to merge with another local club (the Exmouth Echoes) in 1905.

By the 1920s things had improved considerably and Exmouth became one of the top sides in the county, with the first team winning the Devon Senior Cup in 1925 and reserves winning the Devon Junior Cup three times between 1920 and 1926. Although the success of the 1920s was not reflected in the decades before and after the Second World War, there were some moments of note including a home victory over a Swansea side. In the 1960s Exmouth decided to leave Cranford to a more suitable location in town so that they were more accessible to supporters. In 1964 the club moved to its current home at the Imperial Recreation Ground.

When the leagues were introduced in 1987–88 Exmouth were placed in Cornwall/Devon at level 8 of the English rugby union system. Although they were relegated to the Devon regional leagues at the end of 1988–89 they bounced back quickly and spent the remainder of the 1990s in Cornwall/Devon. At the end of the millennium Exmouth finally escaped from level 8 by winning promotion to Western Counties West. The club also won the Devon Junior Cup twice during this period, including a league and cup double in 2000.

During the early 21st century Exmouth started to rise up the league structure and become one of the counties premier sides. They achieved promotion from Western Counties West at the end of 2002 and also won the clubs' first Devon Senior Cup title since 1925. A second promotion at the end of 2008, this time from South West 2 West, saw Exmouth reach level 5 rugby.

On reaching level 5 Exmouth embarked on their most successful spell in the club's history, winning promotion to National League 2 South twice (at tier 4, the highest level the club has reached), and becoming dominant in county rugby with five senior cup victories, including four in row between 2010 and 2014. The only downside during this period was that the club was unable to remain in National League 2 South for longer than a season on each occasion they were promoted to that league.

== Ground ==
Exmouth RFC play at the Imperial Recreation Ground on the banks of the River Exe, just off the Royal Avenue in the heart of Exmouth. As it is next to Exmouth railway station it is easily accessible to supporters and there is plenty of parking, both inside and outside the ground. The ground consists of two enclosed pitches. The main pitch is surrounded by an athletics track and is next to the club-house and there is a covered grand stand. Capacity is around 1,250, which includes 250 in the stand, and a further 1,000 standing pitch side. The second pitch is for 2nd XV and junior games.

== Season summary ==
Season	League			National Cup(s)		County Cup(s)	
Season	Competition/Level	Position	Points	Competition	Performance	Competition	Performance
1987–88	Cornwall/Devon (8)	2nd	18				
1988–89	Cornwall/Devon (8)	10th (relegated)	4				
1989–90	Devon 1 (9)	1st (promoted)					
1990–91	Cornwall/Devon (8)						
1991–92	Cornwall/Devon (8)						
1992–93	Cornwall/Devon (8)						
1993–94	Cornwall/Devon (8)						
1994–95	Cornwall/Devon (8)						
1995–96	Cornwall/Devon (8)						
1996–97	Cornwall/Devon (8)						
1997–98	Cornwall/Devon (8)	3rd	24			Devon Junior Cup	Winners
1998–99	Cornwall/Devon (8)	5th	16				
1999–00	Cornwall/Devon (8)	1st (promoted)	30			Devon Junior Cup	Winners
2000–01	Western Counties West (7)	3rd	32				
2001–02	Western Counties West (7)	1st (promoted)	40				
2002–03	South West 2 West (6)	4th	28			Devon Senior Cup	Winners
2003–04	South West 2 West (6)	9th	18	Powergen Cup	Preliminary Round		
2004–05	South West 2 West (6)	9th	18	Powergen Intermediate Cup			
2005–06	South West 2 West (6)	7th	16	Powergen Intermediate Cup		Devon Senior Cup	Winners
2006–07	South West 2 West (6)	7th	22	EDF Energy Trophy	2nd Round		
2007–08	South West 2 West (6)	1st (promoted)	40	EDF Energy Intermediate Cup	3rd Round	Devon Senior Cup	Runners up
2008–09	South West 1 (5)	8th	20	EDF Energy Trophy	2nd Round		
2009–10	National 3 South West (5) (Note: Following widespread RFU restructuring of the English rugby union system South West 1 was renamed National League 3 South West for the 2009–10 season.)	10th	50 (Note: The 2009–10 season saw the introduction of bonus points to tier 5 English rugby union.)				
2010–11	National 3 South West (5)	8th	62			Devon Senior Cup	Winners
2011–12	National 3 South West (5)	4th	90			Devon Senior Cup	Winners
2012–13	National 3 South West (5)	2nd (promoted via play-off)	107			Devon Senior Cup	Winners
2013–14	National 2 South (4)	16th (relegated)	34			Devon Senior Cup	Winners
2014–15	National 3 South West (5)	2nd (lost play-off)	99			Devon Senior Cup	Semi-finals
2015–16	National 3 South West (5)	1st (promoted)	103			Devon Senior Cup	Winners
2016–17	National 2 South (4)	16th (relegated)	29				
2017–18	South West Premier (5) (Note: National League 3 South West was renamed South West Premier for the 2017–18 season.)	11th	65			Devon Senior Cup	Runners up
2018–19	South West Premier (5)	6th	75			Devon Senior Cup	Runners up
2019–20	South West Premier (5)	10th	54 (Note: The season was postponed and ultimately cancelled due to the COVID-19 pandemic in the United Kingdom with Exmouth sitting in 10th, having played 20 games and gained 45 points. The remaining games were calculated on a 'best playing record formula', with Exmouth remaining in 10th place with 54 points.)			Devon Senior Cup	
2020–21	South West Premier (5)	Cancelled due to COVID-19 pandemic in the United Kingdom.					
2021–22	South West Premier (5)	5th					
Green background stands for either league champions (with promotion) or cup winners. Blue background stands for promotion without winning league or losing cup finalists. Pink background stands for relegation.

== Honours ==
- Devon Junior Cup winners (6): 1920, 1922, 1926, 1938, 1998, 2000 (Note: Four of Exmouth's Devon Junior Cup wins (1920, 1922, 1926, 1938) were won by the reserve side.)
- Devon Senior Cup winners (8): 1925, 2003, 2006, 2011, 2012, 2013, 2014, 2016
- Havill Plate winners (3): 1977, 1981, 1983
- Devon League 1 champions: 1989–90
- Cornwall & Devon champions: 1999–00
- Western Counties West champions: 2001–02
- Tribute South West Division 2 West champions: 2007–08
- National League 3 (south-east v south-west) promotion play-off winner: 2012–13
- National League 3 South West champions: 2015–16

== See also ==
- Devon RFU
