= Paignton RFC =

English rugby union club, based in Devon

Paignton
- Full name: Paignton Rugby Football Club
- Union: Devon RFU
- Nickname: Cherries
- Founded: 1875; 151 years ago
- Location: Paignton, Devon, England
- Ground: Queen's Park (Capacity: 1,650 (150 seats))
- Chairman: Darren Law
- President: Nick Moloney
- League: Counties 1 Western West
- 2024–25: 2nd
Team kit

Official website
- www.paigntonrugby.com

Paignton Rugby Football Club is a rugby union club, originally formed in 1875 and based in Paignton, Devon. They moved to Queens Park in 1902 and have played there ever since. Paignton Rugby Club is affiliated to the Devon RFU and currently compete in Counties 1 Western West – a league at level 7 of the English rugby union system – following their promotion from the Cornwall/Devon League at the end of the 2021–22 season. Many of the club's players have represented the club at county or national level. The club have won the Cornwall/Devon League on three occasions; more than any other club. They have a friendly rivalry with neighbours Torquay Athletic RFC.

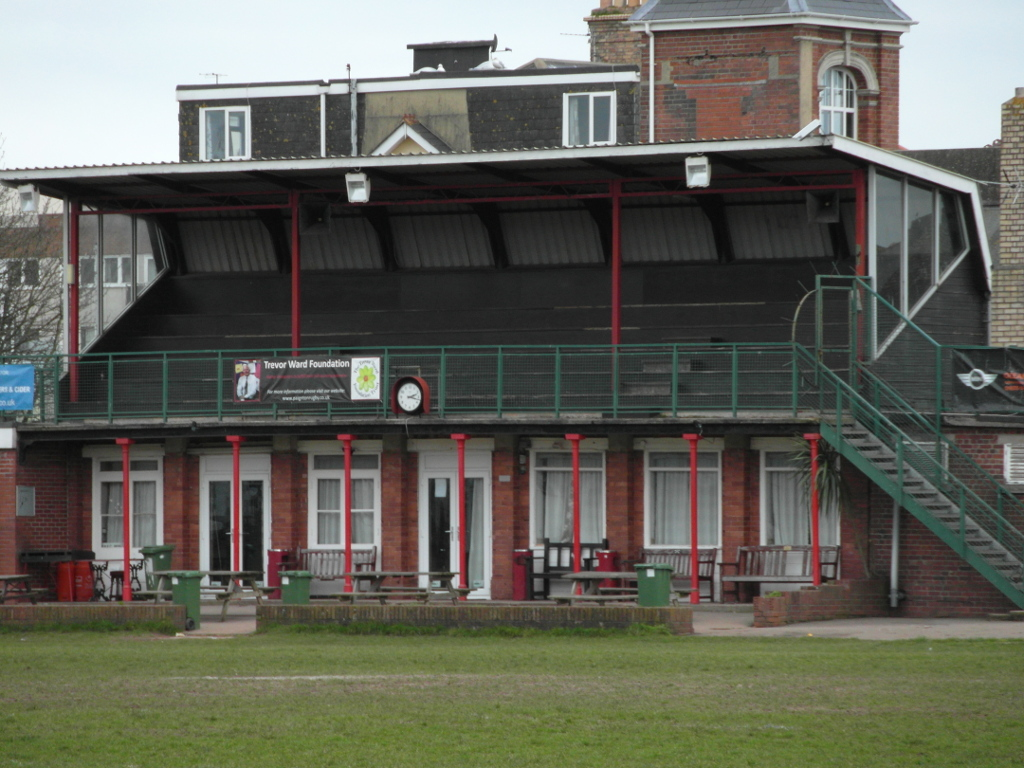
The clubhouse at Queen's Park, home of Paignton RFC

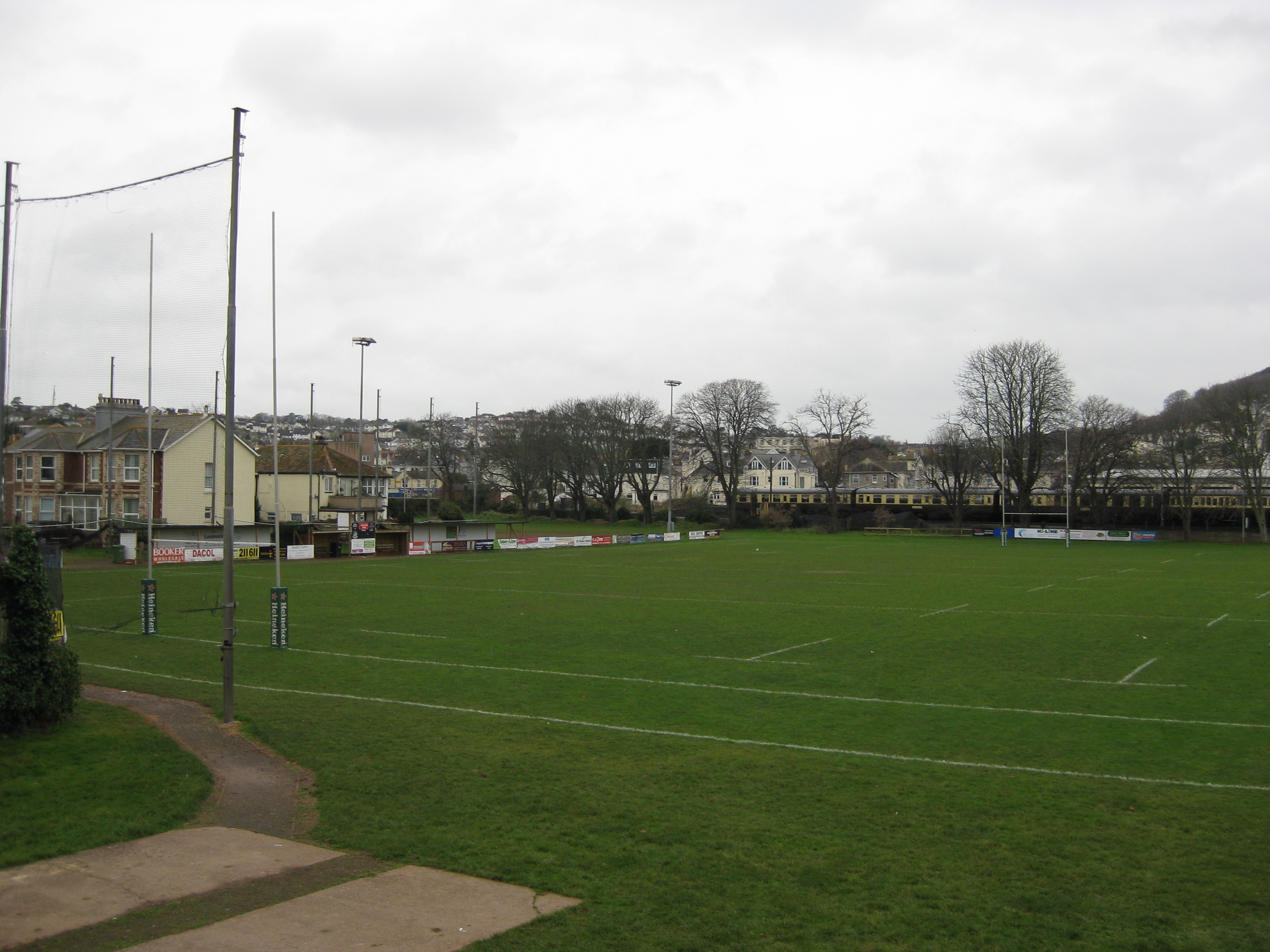
View of the main rugby pitch at Queen's Park

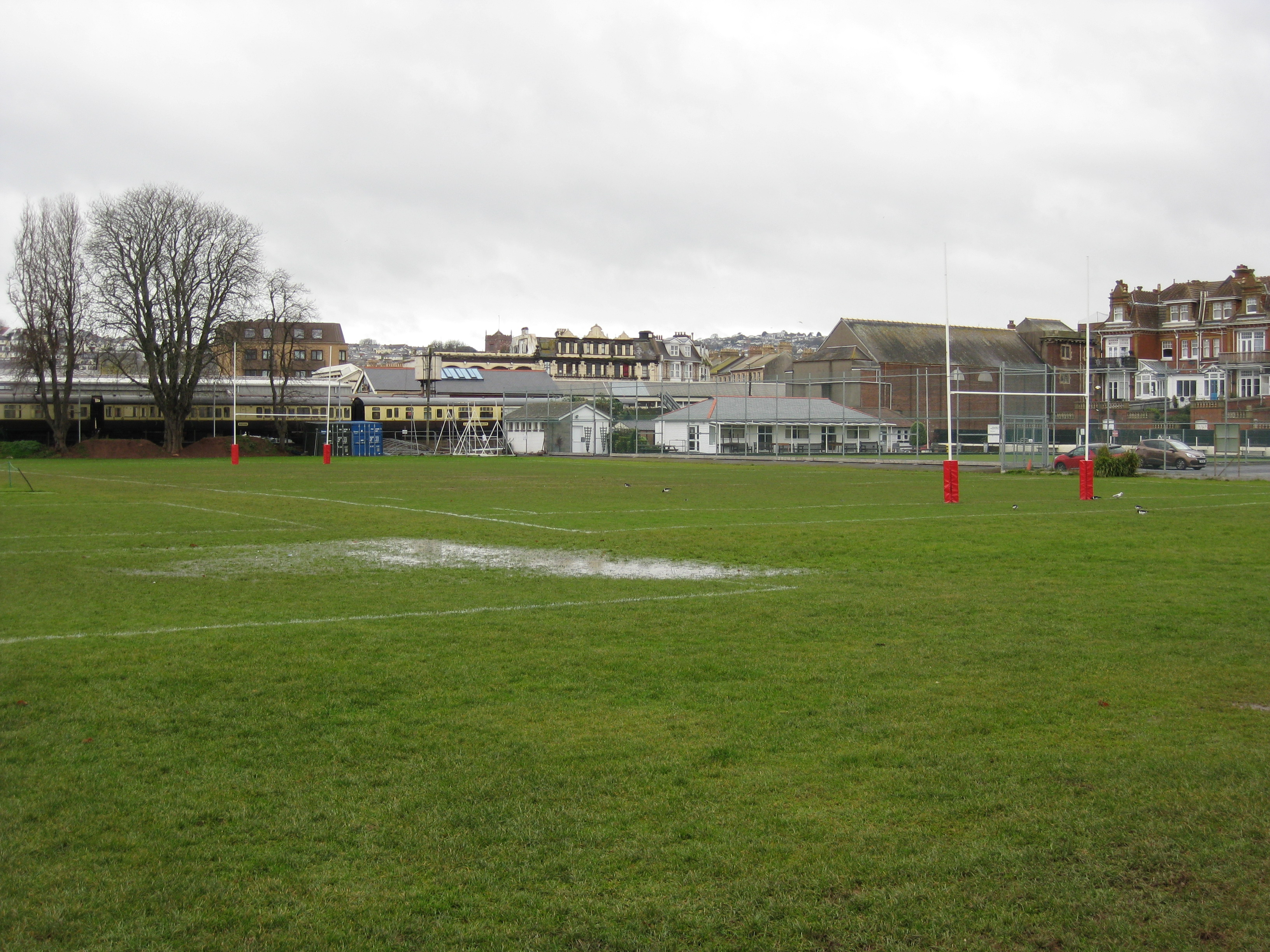
View of the junior rugby pitch at Queen's Park

== History ==
The first Paignton club was formed in 1875. It consisted of gentlemen from Paignton and Torquay and played on Paignton Green. After two successful seasons, the Torquay members left to form a separate “Torquay and South Devon” club. Paignton were one of the first members of the Devon Rugby Football Union, and an earlier incarnation of the modern club, the Paignton Scarlet Runners, were the first ever winners of the Devon Junior Cup in 1889. The club, now based at the Cycle Track behind the Esplanade Hotel, subsequently took senior status but folded within a year. This led to Torquay Athletic being lured from the Recreation Ground to Paignton Cycle Track for the 1890/91 season. At the end of the season, Tics returned to the Rec and a new Paignton club was formed. Paignton went on to win the Junior Cup again in 1900. Several years later Paignton were promoted to the Devon Senior Cup and made the final for the first time in 1904, only to lose to Plymouth. The club would have to wait until the late 1920s for their next success, when a reserve side won the Junior Cup in 1927, followed by a first ever Senior Cup victory in 1931 when they defeated Sidmouth 6-0. After the Second World War the club failed to match the exploits of the 1930s, with the Havill Plate success in 1974 being the only county silverware of note.

With the advent of the leagues in 1987, Paignton were placed in Cornwall/Devon at level 8 of the English rugby union system. A season later they were relegated into Devon 1 where they spent three seasons, also winning the Devon Junior Cup during that time. Promotion back to Cornwall/Devon in 1993 saw the club rise up the league system and they were in South West 2 by 1995. They spent five seasons at tier 7 (renamed to Western Counties West) until they were relegated at the end of 2000–01 season, their campaign not help by an outbreak of foot and mouth disease which meant a number of games went unplayed. The club were not gone for long as they made a speedy return by winning Cornwall/Devon the following year.

Despite a further relegation in 2006, the club started to enter a period of success with two quick-fire promotions in 2007 and 2008 to book their place in South West 2 West, which at tier 6 was the highest level the club had reached in its league history. They also started to become one of the more competitive sides in the county, reaching the Devon Senior Cup final in 2007 (losing to rivals Torquay) and winning the Devon Senior Plate in 2010. The next decade was not quite as successful as the club dropped two divisions following relegations in 2013 and 2014, although another promotion (as runners up in Cornwall/Devon) at the end of the 2016–17 season has seen Paignton stabilise in Western Counties West.

At the end of the 2018–19 season, Paignton finished bottom on Western Counties West and were relegated to level 8 (Tribute Cornwall/Devon).

== Ground ==
Queens Park is situated in the heart of Paignton, just off Queens Road, near to the sea and less than 5 minutes walk from the train station. The ground was built in 1900 on what was formerly marshy land and is shared by both Paignton Rugby Football Club and Paignton Cricket Club, with rugby taking place in the autumn and spring, and cricket in the summer months. Parking is available at the ground.

At the entrance of the ground there is the Victorian era club-house, with the grandstand on top, and there are two rugby pitches - one for senior matches, the other for juniors, with small covered areas adjacent to the senior pitch. In the summer this area is then combined to host cricket fixtures. Originally there was just one rugby pitch horizontal to the club-house/grandstand, but due to damage caused to the cricket wicket it was decided to instead split the area into two pitches, with the wicket in between. The grandstand has seating capacity for around 150, while the main rugby pitch has standing capacity for approximately 1,500 supporters, bringing the total capacity to 1,650. When cricket is played the capacity increases to around 3,000.

== Teams ==
The club has several teams in its senior and youth sections. There are male and female teams ranging from under-6 teams to under-16 teams in the youth section and the senior teams being the 1st XV, 2nd XV, 3rd XV (affectionately knowns as the "Rams") and a ladies team.

== Season summary ==
Season	League			National Cup(s)		County Cup(s)	
Season	Competition/Level	Position	Points	Competition	Performance	Competition	Performance
1987–88	Cornwall/Devon (8)	6th	10				
1988–89	Cornwall/Devon (8)	9th (relegated)	8				
1989–90	Devon 1 (9)						
1990–91	Devon 1 (9)						
1991–92	Devon 1 (9)					Devon Junior Cup	Winners
1992–93	Devon 1 (9)	1st (promoted)					
1993–94	Cornwall/Devon (8)						
1994–95	Cornwall/Devon (8)	1st (promoted)					
1995–96	Western Counties (7)						
1996–97	Western Counties West (7)	4th	23				
1997–98	Western Counties West (7)	7th	18				
1998–99	Western Counties West (7)	5th	18				
1999–00	Western Counties West (7)	4th	20				
2000–01	Western Counties West (7)	9th (relegated) (Note: At the end of the 2000–01 season there were more relegations from Western Counties West than usual due to with four teams going down, including 9th placed Paignton. Foot-and-mouth disease affected the league and most teams were unable to fulfil all fixtures which meant that 10th placed South Molton escaped relegation on aggregate points from games played.)	15				
2001–02	Cornwall/Devon (8)	1st (promoted)	25				
2002–03	Western Counties West (7)	10th	18				
2003–04	Western Counties West (7)	9th	16	Powergen Intermediate Cup			
2004–05	Western Counties West (7)	10th	11				
2005–06	Western Counties West (7)	11th (relegated)	10	Powergen Intermediate Cup			
2006–07	Cornwall/Devon (8)	1st (promoted)	38	EDF Energy Senior Vase		Devon RFU Senior Cup	Runners up
2007–08	Western Counties West (7)	1st (promoted)	36	EDF Energy Trophy	3rd Round	Devon Senior Cup	Semi-finals
2008–09	South West 2 West (6)	6th	21	EDF Energy Intermediate Cup			
2009–10	South West 1 West (6) (Note: RFU restructuring of the English rugby union system for the 2009–10 season saw South West 2 West renamed as South West 1 West.)	4th	38			Devon Senior Plate	Winners
2010–11	South West 1 West (6)	7th	58 (Note: The 2010–11 season would see the introduction of bonus points into lower league English rugby union (tier 6 and below).)			Devon Senior Vase	Runners up
2011–12	South West 1 West (6)	10th	56			Devon Senior Cup	Semi-finals
2012–13	South West 1 West (6)	13th (relegated)	33			Devon Senior Cup	
2013–14	Western Counties West (7)	14th (relegated)	4				
2014–15	Cornwall/Devon (8)	5th	74			Devon Intermediate Cup	1st Round
2015–16	Cornwall/Devon (8)	8th	58			Devon Intermediate Cup	Semi-finals
2016–17	Cornwall/Devon (8)	2nd (promoted)	104			Devon Senior Cup	1st Round
2017–18	Western Counties West (7)	9th	51			Devon Intermediate Cup	1st Round
2018–19	Western Counties West (7)	14th (relegated)	36			Devon Intermediate Cup	5th
2019–20	Cornwall/Devon (8)	2nd (promoted)	85.70 (Note: The season was postponed and ultimately cancelled due to the COVID-19 pandemic in the United Kingdom with Paignton sitting in 2nd, having played 20 games and gained 73 points. The remaining games were calculated on a 'best playing record formula', with Paignton remaining in 2nd place with 85.70 points and claiming promotion.)			Devon Intermediate Shield	
2019–20	Western Counties West (7)						
Green background stands for either league champions (with promotion) or cup winners. Blue background stands for promotion without winning league or losing cup finalists. Pink background stands for relegation.

== Honours ==
- Devon Junior Cup winners (4): 1889, 1900, 1927 (reserve team), 1992
- Devon Senior Cup winners: 1931
- Havill Plate winners: 1974
- Cornwall & Devon champions (3): 1994–95, 2001–02, 2006–07
- Tribute Western Counties West champions: 2007-08
- Devon Senior Plate winners: 2010

Devon Senior Cup record

- 1906 (lost) 12 – 4 in the final against Plymouth.
- 1931 (won), 6 – 0 in final against Sidmouth
- 2007 runner-up in a final against Torquay
- 2008 semi-final

Source - Devon RFU Handbook 2005/2006

== See also ==
- Devon RFU
