= David Butt Memorial Trophy =

Annual rugby union competition in Devon

- Sport: Rugby Union
- Instituted: 2016; 10 years ago
- Number of teams: 16
- Country: England
- Holders: South Molton (2017–18)
- Most titles: New Cross, South Molton (1 title)
- Website: Devon RFU

The David Butt Memorial Trophy is an annual rugby union knock-out club competition organized by the Devon Rugby Football Union. It was introduced at the start of the 2016–17 season in honour of David Butt, who had been chair of the Devon RFU, and had died back in April 2016. A former rugby player and coach with Barnstaple and South Molton, David had also been involved in local politics and was a Liberal Democrat Councillor as well as having been deputy leader of North Devon Council. The first-ever winners of the competition were New Cross who won the final held at Pottingham Road in Barnstaple.

The David Butt Memorial Trophy is open to club sides in Devon that play at tier 9 (Devon League 1) and tier 10 (Devon League 2) of the English rugby union league system and is held during the autumn months as a prelude to league action. The current format involves a first round group stage, organized by geography to minimize travel, followed by a knock-out stage featuring semi-finals and a final to be held at a neutral venue.

== David Butt Memorial Trophy winners ==
David Butt Memorial Trophy Finals
Year	Winner	Score	Runners–up	Venue
2016	New Cross	21-15	Old Technicians	Pottingham Road, Barnstaple
2017	South Molton	29-8	Dartmouth	Pottingham Road, Barnstaple
2018				

== Number of wins ==
- New Cross (1)
- South Molton (1)

== See also ==
- Devon RFU
- Devon Senior Cup
- Devon Intermediate Cup
- Devon Junior Cup
- Havill Plate
- English rugby union system
- Rugby union in England
