= Devonport Services R.F.C. =

English rugby union club, based in Plymouth, Devon

(England) Devonport Services R.F.C.
- Full name: Devonport Services R.F.C
- Union: Royal Navy Rugby Union
- Nickname: The Sporting Blues. Given in 1909.
- Founded: 1904; 122 years ago
- Location: Plymouth, Devon, England
- Ground: The Rectory Field (Capacity: 2,000 (Note: Rectory Field ground capacity was originally 7,000 until the main stand was closed in 2005.))
- Chairman: Captain Tim Leeder RN
- President: Cdr Peter Coulson CBE.RN retd
- Coach(es): Ben Russell, Rikki Bentham
- Captain: Mr Matt Gregory Esq
- League: Regional 1 South West
- 2025–26: 1st (promoted to National League 2 West)
Team kit

Official website
- www.pitchero.com/clubs/devonportservices

Devonport Services Rugby Football Club is an English rugby union team based in Plymouth, Devon. The club was originally called United Services Devonport and had their first recorded match back in 1904. Devonport Services play their homes games at the Rectory Field and their strip and club colours are dark blue and red. They are currently competing in National League 2 West, a tier 4 league in the English rugby union league system, following their promotion from Regional 1 South West at the end of 2024–25 season.

== Current club ==
Once open to the members of the British Armed Forces only, the rules were relaxed in 1994 when the youth teams joined the club, therefore allowing civilians to play alongside serving armed forces players. However, the club rules stipulate that at least 50% of the club's senior squad playing must be members of the Armed Forces – mainly from the Royal Navy and Royal Marines. As well as first team the club runs 2nd and 3rd teams, colts, ladies and the occasional vets team. There are also multiple youth teams for boys (6 – 16) and girls (12, 14, 16 and 18).

== Current standings ==
2026–27 National League 2 West table
Pos	Team	Pld	W	D	L	PF	PA	PD	TB	LB	Pts	Qualification
1	Redruth	6	6	0	0	265	121	+144	5	0	29	Promotion place
2	Taunton Titans	6	5	0	1	264	132	+132	5	1	26	Promotion play-off
3	Hinckley	6	5	0	1	253	108	+145	5	0	25	
4	Luctonians	6	5	0	1	198	129	+69	5	0	25	
5	Clifton	6	5	0	1	240	189	+51	5	0	25	
6	Lymm	6	4	0	2	198	202	−4	5	1	22	
7	Old Redcliffians	6	3	0	3	194	188	+6	5	1	18	
8	Cinderford	6	3	0	3	222	250	−28	5	0	17	
9	Loughborough Students	6	2	0	4	197	236	−39	5	1	14	
10	Hornets	6	1	0	5	180	200	−20	4	4	12	
11	Barnstaple	6	2	0	4	139	174	−35	2	1	11	
12	Bournville	6	1	0	5	212	348	−136	5	1	10	Relegation play-off
13	Devonport Services	6	0	0	6	145	294	−149	3	1	4	Relegation place
14	Exeter University	6	0	0	6	140	276	−136	2	0	2	Relegation place

Updated to match(es) played on 10 October 2026. Source: National League Rugby
Rules for classification: If teams are level at any stage, tiebreakers are applied in the following order:
1. Number of matches won
2. Number of matches drawn
3. Difference between points for and against
4. Total number of points for
5. Aggregate number of points scored in matches between tied teams
6. Number of matches won excluding the first match, then the second and so on until the tie is settled

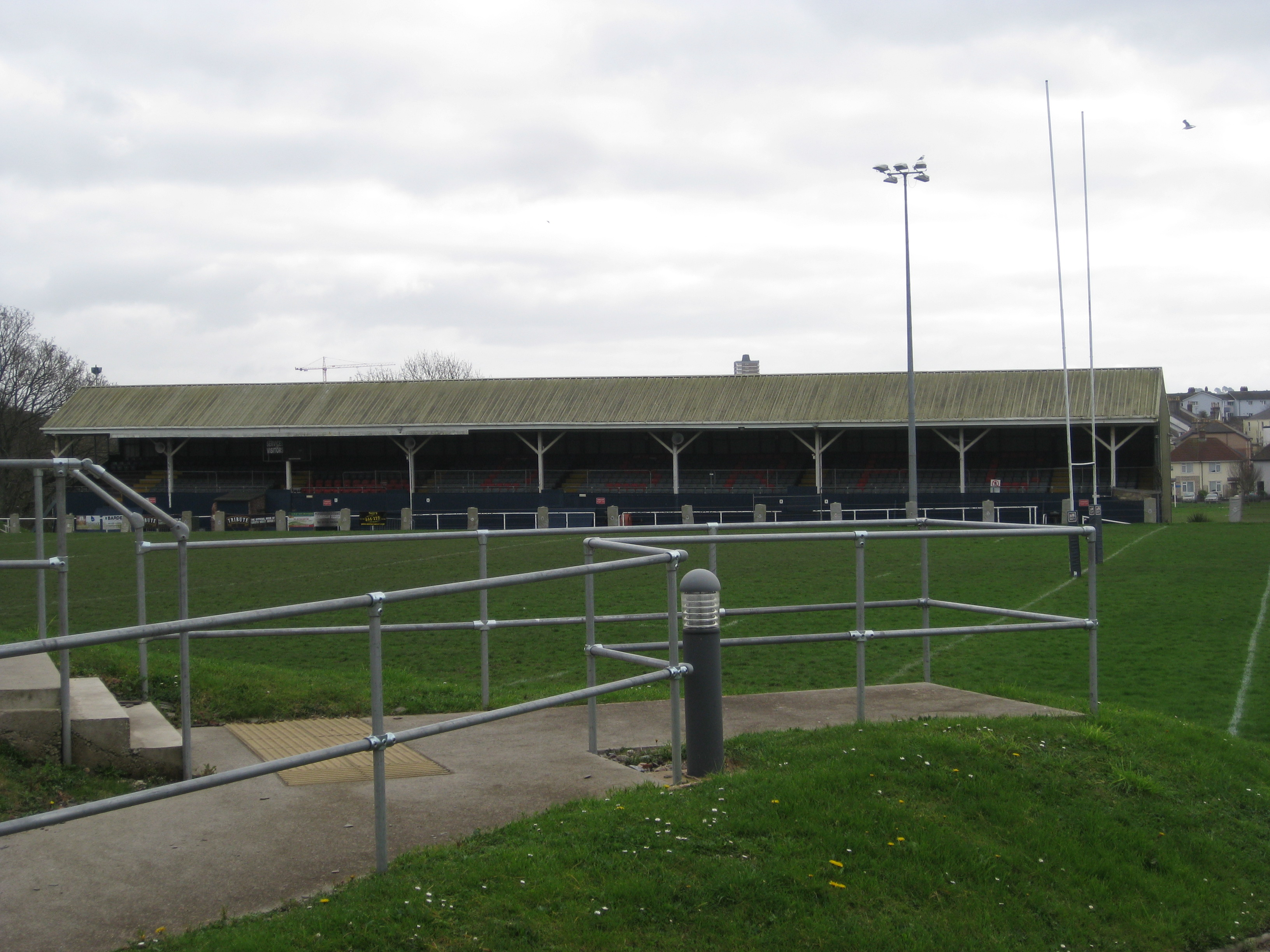
Inside Rectory Field, home of Devonport Services RFC.

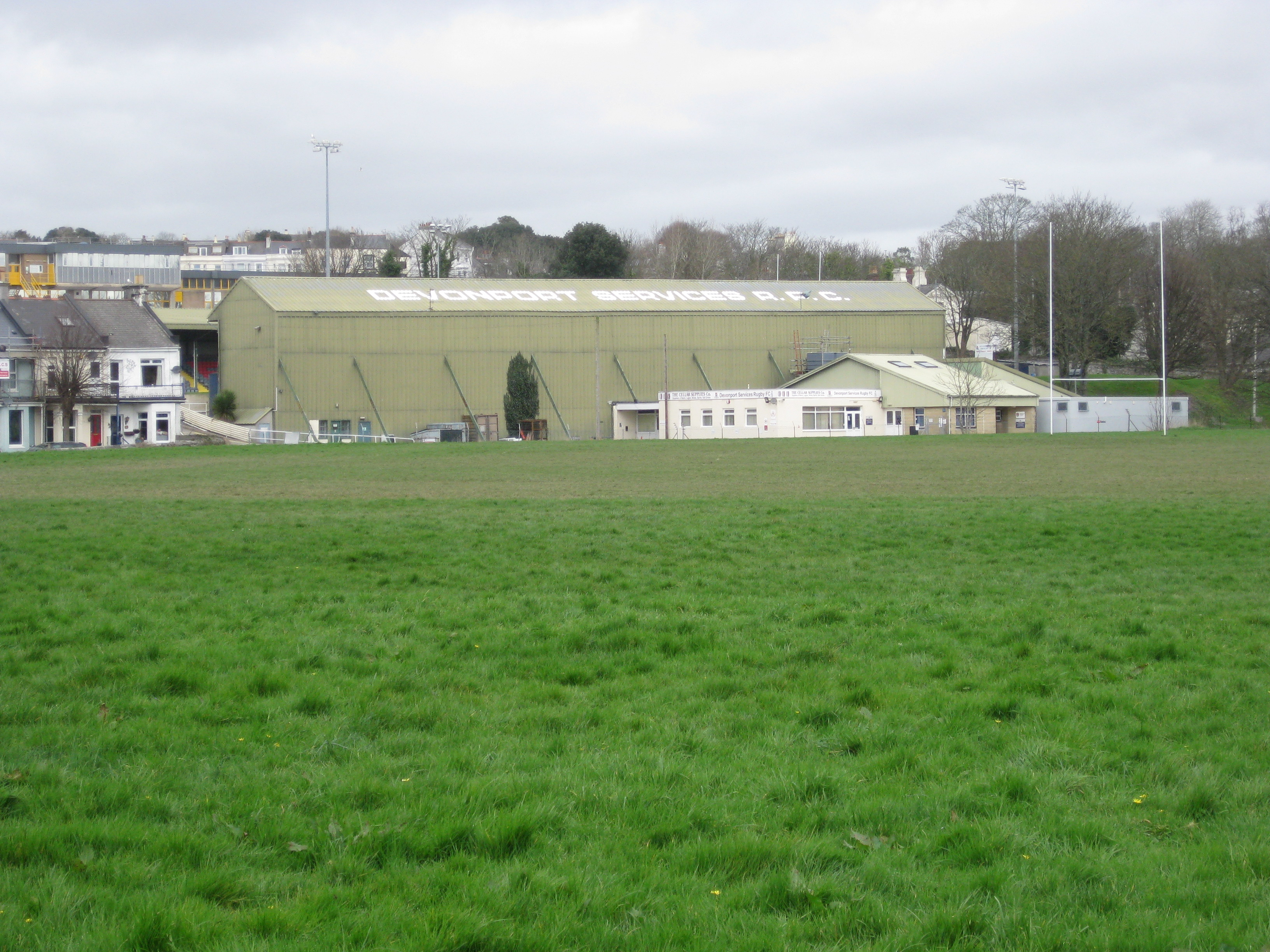
View of Rectory Field taken from outside of the ground.

== History ==
=== Early beginnings ===
Although the beginnings of the club are hazy they were certainly established during the first decade of the 20th century. The team, then known as United Services Devonport, was initially open to officers of the British Armed Forces, with the first recorded match being on 1 October 1904 when Services played a 2–2 draw against Plymouth RFC (a parent club of Plymouth Albion) in front of a crowd of 6,000. During the early stages of the club the team did not perform particularly well until 1912 when the club opened its playing membership to other ranks in the military and results improved dramatically.

The first mention of the club using the current name of Devonport Services with any regularity was around 1910/1911, although occasionally the press covering games would call them United Services leading to a degree of confusion. In 1912 the club was given the nickname "The Sporting Blues" by the South Wales Echo who used this name as part of their headline when covering the Services game away to Swansea. The Services initially played home games at Keyham, owned by the RNEC but during 1920s they moved to the Rectory Field in Devonport. The Rectory Field had previously been occupied by Devonport Albion, who were the strongest side in Devon during the early 20th century, but the ground was sold for £6,500 to the Navy in 1920. In the same year Devonport Albion merged with Plymouth RFC to form Plymouth Albion and subsequently moved to Beacon Park. In 1928 the Rectory Field was procured by the Royal Navy and Royal Marines Sports Control Board who rented it out to Devonport Services who have remained there ever since.

=== Postwar years ===
During World War II the Rectory Field was destroyed by fire due to Luftwaffe bombing raids, leaving only a small section of stand considered safe enough for spectators. The post war years would see the Rectory Field rebuilt, leaving Devonport Services without a home ground for several years. By 1948 the damaged main stand was rebuilt and space for around 1,200 supporters, while additional facilities such as separate changing rooms and a bar were added, and a second stand was also added – leading to the ground becoming known as the “Twickenham of the West”. After being rebuilt the Rectory Field had a capacity of around 7,000 – which was the largest recorded attendance when the Combined Services played the All Blacks on the 30 November 1993.

=== Up to present day ===
As well as hosting the All Blacks, the early 1990s were a successful time for the club as they won back to back league titles by winning Devon League 1 in 1992, followed by Tribute Cornwall/Devon in 1993. They spent four seasons in Western Counties West before being relegated in 1999. In 2003 Devonport Services won promotion by winning the Tribute Cornwall/Devon for the second time. Once again they enjoyed a number of seasons in Western Counties West until 2005 which saw them in last place with just one league win. This relegation was short-lived as Services came second in Tribute Devon/Cornwall, the following season and promotion back to Western Counties West.

Since 2005 the main south stand of Rectory Field was closed due to safety concerns (it is made of wood and a fire hazard), leaving the current capacity at around 2,000 which includes the (still open) Luddington north stand and standing areas. The stand was named after MAA Bill Luddington who won thirteen England caps, while with the club. In 2020–21 the south stand was demolished.

== Season summary ==
Season	League			National Cup(s)		County Cup(s)	
Season	Competition/Level	Position	Points	Competition	Performance	Competition	Performance
1987–88	South West 2 (6)	(relegated)		John Player Cup	1st round		
1988–89	Western Counties (7)	(relegated)					
1989–90	Cornwall/Devon (8)						
1990–91	Cornwall/Devon (8)	(relegated)					
1991–92	Devon 1 (9)	1st (promoted)					
1992–93	Cornwall/Devon (8)	1st (promoted)					
1993–94	Western Counties (7)						
1994–95	Western Counties (7)	2nd					
1995–96	Western Counties (7)	4th (promoted) (Note: RFU restructuring, due to the forthcoming cancellation of Courage League Division 5, led to a reorganisation of the leagues in the south-west region, with 4th place Devonport Services promoted to South West 2 West.)	14				
1996–97	South West 2 West (6)	11th (relegated)	8				
1997–98	Western Counties West (7)	8th	16				
1998–99	Western Counties West (7)	9th (relegated)	15				
1999–00	Cornwall/Devon (8)	2nd (promoted)	26				
2000–01	Western Counties West (7)	8th (relegated) (Note: Despite finishing 8th (out of 12 teams) Devonport Services were relegated at the end of the 2000–01 season.)	15				
2001–02	Cornwall/Devon (8)	4th	21				
2002–03	Cornwall/Devon (8)	1st (promoted)	30			Withdrawn (Note: From 2002 Devonport Services were withdrawn from county cup competitions by the Devon RFU due to the clubs re-affiliation with the RNFU. This ban was lifted for the 2015–16 season when Devonport Services were allowed back into county cup competitions once more.)	
2003–04	Western Counties West (7)	7th	17	Powergen Intermediate Cup	2nd round	Withdrawn	
2004–05	Western Counties West (7)	12th (relegated)	3			Withdrawn	
2005–06	Cornwall/Devon (8)	2nd (promoted)	34	Powergen Junior Vase	Quarter-finals	Withdrawn	
2006–07	Western Counties West (7)	5th	22	EDF Energy Senior Vase	2nd round	Withdrawn	
2007–08	Western Counties West (7)	7th	20	EDF Energy Senior Vase	5th round	Withdrawn	
2008–09	Western Counties West (7)	5th	25	EDF Energy Senior Vase	2nd round	Withdrawn	
2009–10	Western Counties West (7)	8th	21			Withdrawn	
2010–11	Western Counties West (7)	9th	62 (Note: The 2010–11 season saw the introduction of bonus points into the lower leagues (tier 6 and below).)			Withdrawn	
2011–12	Western Counties West (7)	11th	39			Withdrawn	
2012–13	Western Counties West (7)	3rd	81			Withdrawn	
2013–14	Western Counties West (7)	8th	56			Withdrawn	
2014–15	Western Counties West (7)	6th	70			Withdrawn	
2015–16	Western Counties West (7)	9th	55			Devon Intermediate Cup	1st round
2016–17	Western Counties West (7)	3rd	82			Devon Senior Cup	1st round
2017–18	Western Counties West (7)	2nd (promoted via play-off)	90	SW Intermediate Cup	Quarter-finals (Note: Devonport exited the competition during the South West Counties semi-final, which was equivalent to the quarter-finals of the overall South West Intermediate Cup.)	Devon Intermediate Cup	Semi-finals
2018–19	South West 1 West (6)	8th	70			Devon Senior Shield	Runners up
2019–20	South West 1 West (6)	4th	80.53 (Note: The season was postponed and ultimately cancelled due to the COVID-19 pandemic in the United Kingdom with Devonport Services sitting in 3rd, having played 19 games and gained 65 points. The remaining games were calculated on a 'best playing record formula', with Devonport Services dropping one place to 4th with 80.53 points.)			Devon Senior Shield	
2020–21	South West 1 West (6)	Cancelled due to COVID-19 pandemic in the United Kingdom.					
2021–22	South West 1 West (6)	2nd (promoted)	91				
2022–23	Regional 1 South West (5)	4th	61			Devon Senior Cup	Champions
2023–24	Regional 1 South West (5)	1st (promoted)	94			Devon Senior Cup	Champions
2024–25	National 2 West (4)	14th (relegated)	32				
2025–26	Regional 1 South West (5)	1st (promoted)	94				
Green background stands for either league champions (with promotion) or cup winners. Blue background stands for promotion without winning league or losing cup finalists. Pink background stands for relegation.

== Honours ==
- Courage Devon 1 champions: 1991–92
- Cornwall & Devon champions (2): 1992–93, 2002–03
- Tribute Western Counties (north v west) promotion play-off winners: 2017–18
- Regional 1 South West champions: 2023–24 2025–26

== Representative honours ==
=== International ===
37 players have gained men's senior international caps while at Devonport Services including 97 caps for England.

- England (14 players): Clarke.S, Eyres.W.C.T, Faithfull.C.K.T, Gardener.E.R, Gilbert.F.G, Gilbert.R, Harding.E.H, Hosking.D'Arcy, Luddington.W.G.E, Moore.W.K.T, Sharp.R, Vaughan.D.B, Webb.C.S.H, Woods.T
- Wales (14): D. Bebb, G. Bevan, J. Collins, T. Davies, C. James, B. Jones, L. Jones, D. Main, H. Mainwaring, A. Meredith, B. Meredith, M.C. Thomas, L. Williams, W. Williams
- Ireland (3): W.F. Horsey-Brown, H.W.V. Stephenson, M. Sugden
- Scotland (5): J. Aitkin, T. Rodd, K. Ross, G. Waddell, P. Waklastow
- The Philippines: Liam 'Rufio' Williams.
- Barbarians (7): M.C. Thomas, B. Gray, J. Highton, E. Hosking, SA. Lewis Jones, G. Waddell, J.K. Watkins

=== Youth internationals ===
Twelve players have gained youth international caps while at Devonport Services.

- England under 18s: Jack Arnott
- England under 16s: R. Haddlington, N. Batchelor, S. Trethewey, J. Currie, Jack Arnott, Richard Bayliss, Dan Pullinger-Ham, Tom Mumford
- England Colts: S. Trethewey, N. Batchelor
- Scotland under 18s: S. Meakin

=== Men's county/representative ===
95 players have gained county or representative caps while at Devonport Services.

- Devon (71): B. Badcock., C.A. Baker, S. Bennett, F.W. Bristow., Broome. Leading seaman, D. Brown, A.E. Carter, S. Clarke, M. Connolly., W.L. Copley, J.H. Dalyrymple, T.E. Davies, W. Davies, W.CT. Eyres, G. Fabian, E.J. Gardener, ERA. George, B.M. Gray., Sub-Lieut Hargrave, R. Hart., M. Hewitt, J. Highton., A. Higginson., R.M. Holgate.R.M., G.R. Hoskin, J. Husson, B. Jones, S. Jones, L. Kenny, J. Lane, K.A. Lavelle, T.S. Lee, Midshipman, W.M. Lowery, J. Martin, Meadows, A. Meredith, C. Miller, Lieutenant Middleditch, G. Morgan., J.K. Morrison., M.A. Pearey, B. Penfold, N. Penny, A. Pond, G. Price, F.A. Prosser, D. Pulford, G.D.O. Randel, Lieutenant Robotham, T.L. Scott, J. Shone, D.H. Smaldon, C.S. Stafford, L.S. Stovell, J.H. Tarr, D.G. Wixon
- Devon 7's: Ben Ashford
- Cornwall: Campbell, Lieutenant Carter, E.J. Gardener, F.G. Gilbert, Instructor Lieutenant B. Glastonbury, B.C. Gosling., S.J. Kealey, Lieutenant Kelly, Ldg Shiells, Instructor Lieutenant Thomas, Midshipman Walsham
- Somerset: G. Criddle, H.W. Hoar
- Surrey: J. Lion
- Hampshire: M.J. Brosnan, T.G.P. Crick, B.G. Gosling, Lieutenant Mares
- Dorset & Wilts: T. Hodgins
- Berkshire: Lieutenant Fenner
- Oxfordshire: Lieutenant Elvy
- Kent (1): Coyte
- Cumberland (1): Sub-Lieutenant Webster

=== Youth county/representative ===
Eleven players have gained youth county or representative caps while at Devonport Services.

- Devon under 20s: M. Anstis, S. Bennett, Tom Arscott, J. Daley, L. Stannard, T. Wheale.
- Devon Under 18's, Richard Goldsby-West, Jordan Patey.
- South West under 20s: Charlie Attis, Richard Baylis.
- South West under 16s: Richard Bayliss, Dan Pullinger-Ham, Tom Mumford, Chalie Attis, Mike Lewis, Richard Goldsby-West.

=== Ladies international/representative ===
Two players have gained international or representative caps while at Devonport Services.

- England: Lagi Tuima
- England under 18s: Lagi Tuima,
- England under 20s: Jess Thomas. Lagi Tuima.
- England Students (Ladies): Marcia Burgess

== See also ==
- Devon RFU
- Royal Navy Rugby Union
