= Brixham RFC =

English rugby union club, based in Devon

Brixham
- Full name: Brixham Rugby Football Club
- Union: Devon RFU
- Nickname: The Fishermen
- Founded: 1875; 151 years ago
- Location: Brixham, Devon, England
- Ground: Astley Park (Capacity: 1,800 (300 stand))
- Chairman: Chris Forster
- President: Keith Gardner
- Coach: Adam Thomas
- Captain: Jordan Watson
- League: Regional 1 South West
- 2025–26: 3rd
Team kit

Official website
- www.brixhamrfc.co.uk

Brixham Rugby Football Club is an English rugby union team based at Astley Park in Brixham, Devon. The club runs three senior teams, colts, a women's team known as The Sirens and the full range of junior teams. The first XV currently play in Regional 1 South West, a level five league in the English rugby union system.

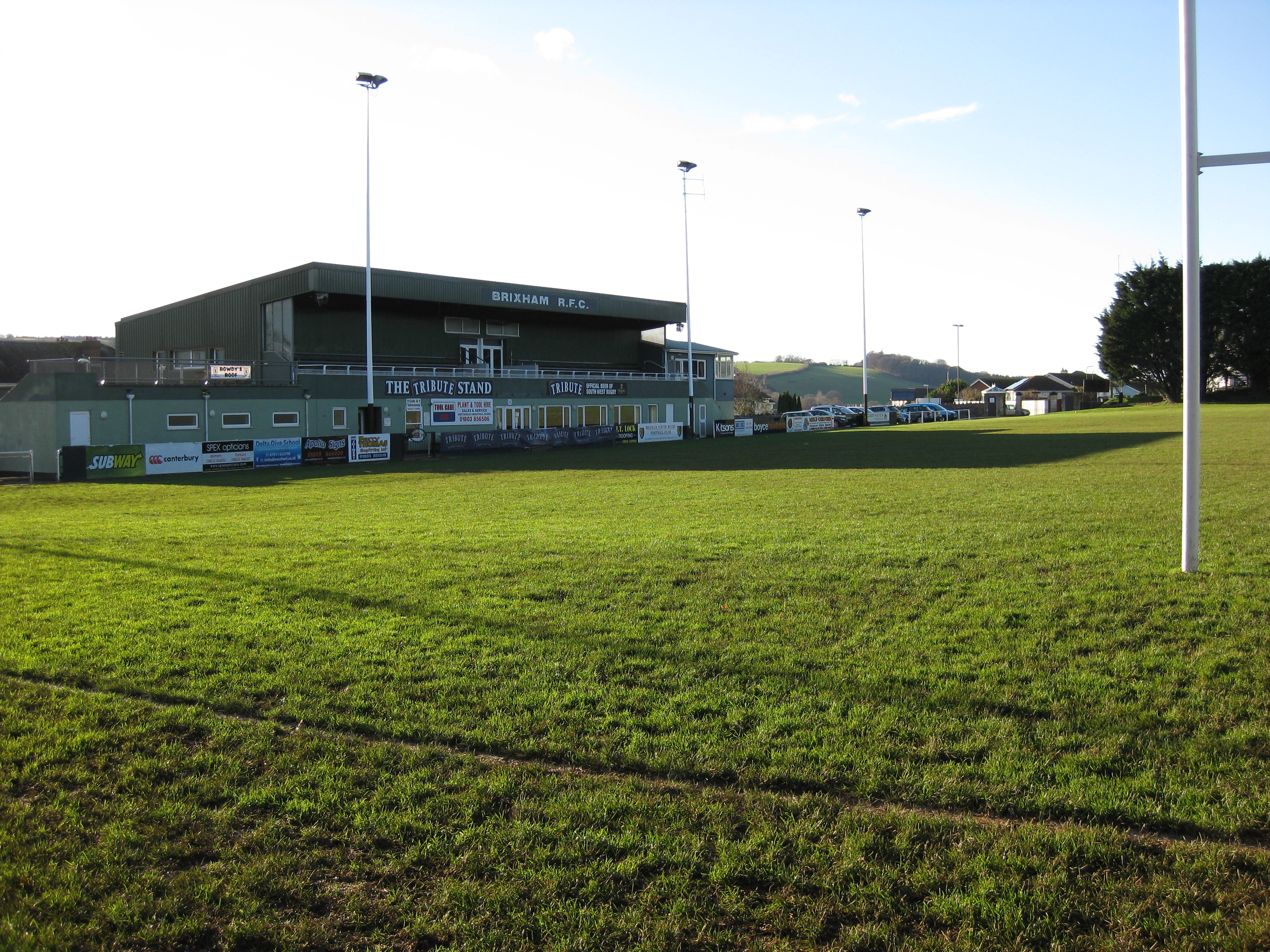
Astley Park, home of Brixham Rugby Club

== History ==
Brixham RFC was formed in 1875, as reported in Alcock's Football Annual 1876 edition, and became one of the founder members of the Devon RFU. In 1896 the club moved to its present ground, having previously played at Furzeham Green. Between 1924 and 1934 the club won the Devon Cup twice and were runner-up on four other occasions. When the leagues were introduced in 1987 the club was placed in the sixth tier league; South West 2.

At the end of 1989 Brixham were promoted to South West 1 where they remained for eight seasons when they were relegated at the end of the 1996–97 season. During this period they also enjoyed several runs in the Pilkington Cup, with the best performance coming in 1988–89 when they reached the third round, losing at home to Gloucester in front of almost 3,000 supporters. The club remained at level 6 for fifteen seasons until they finally promoted to level 5 by winning South West 1 West at the end of the 2011–12 season. This promotion also saw the club become one of the premier sides in the county, finally winning the Devon RFU Senior Cup in 2015 (their first victory since 1932) and then again in 2017.

== Ground ==
Astley Park is on Rea Barn Road in Brixham, opposite the police station and near to Brixham College. The ground consists of a club-house/stand alongside the main pitch, and there are also several other pitches on adjoining land for second XV and junior rugby. The stand sits atop the club-house and has seating/standing capacity for up to 300, while there is standing space for around 1,500 supporters pitch side, bringing the total capacity to approximately 1,800. There is limited parking in and around the ground.

== Season summary ==
Season	League			National Cup(s)		County Cup(s)	
Season	Competition/Level	Position	Points	Competition	Performance	Competition	Performance
1987–88	South West 2 (6)						
1988–89	South West 2 (6)	2nd (promoted)		Pilkington Cup	3rd Round		
1989–90	South West 1 (5)						
1990–91	South West 1 (5)			Pilkington Cup	1st Round		
1991–92	South West 1 (5)						
1992–93	South West 1 (5)			Pilkington Cup	1st Round		
1993–94	South West 1 (6) (Note: RFU restructuring of the English rugby union system for the 1993–94 season due to the creation Courage League Division 5 meant that South West 1 became a tier 6 league.)			Pilkington Cup	2nd Round		
1994–95	South West 1 (6)						
1995–96	South West 1 (6)			Pilkington Cup	1st Round		
1996–97	South West 1 (5) (Note: The cancellation of Courage League Division 5 at the end of the 1995–96 season meant that South West 1 once again became a tier 5 league.)	11th (relegated)	12				
1997–98	South West 2 West (6)	6th	22				
1998–99	South West 2 West (6)	3rd	28				
1999–00	South West 2 West (6)	2nd	36				
2000–01	South West 2 West (6)	5th	24				
2001–02	South West 2 West (6)	3rd	31				
2002–03	South West 2 West (6)	5th	28				
2003–04	South West 2 West (6)	4th	26	Powergen Intermediate Cup	6th Round	Devon Senior Cup	Runners up
2004–05	South West 2 West (6)	7th	18	Powergen Cup	Qualifying Round		
2005–06	South West 2 West (6)	3rd	32	Powergen Intermediate Cup			
2006–07	South West 2 West (6)	2nd (lost playoff)	32	EDF Energy Intermediate Cup	1st Round		
2007–08	South West 2 West (6)	8th	19	EDF Energy Intermediate Cup	2nd Round		
2008–09	South West 2 West (6)	7th	19	EDF Energy Intermediate Cup	1st Round		
2009–10	South West 1 West (6) (Note: RFU restructuring of the English rugby union system for the 2009–10 season meant that South West 2 West was renamed as South West 1 West.)	3rd	39			Devon Senior Cup	Runners up
2010–11	South West 1 West (6)	3rd	99 (Note: The 2010–11 season saw the introduction of bonus points in the lower leagues (tier 6 and below).)				
2011–12	South West 1 West (6)	1st (promoted)	100			Devon Senior Cup	Runner-up
2012–13	National 3 South West (5) (Note: The last time Brixham was in this division it was known as South West 1.)	7th	77			Devon Senior Cup	1st Round
2013–14	National 3 South West (5)	7th	68			Devon Senior Cup	Semi-finals
2014–15	National 3 South West (5)	5th	84			Devon Senior Cup	Winners
2015–16	National 3 South West (5)	4th	77			Devon Senior Cup	Runners up
2016–17	National 3 South West (5)	7th	71			Devon Senior Cup	Winners
2017–18	South West Premier (5) (Note: National League 3 South West was renamed as South West Premier for the 2017–18 season.)	10th	65			Devon Senior Cup	Semi-finals
2018–19	South West Premier (5)	8th	71			Devon Senior Cup	5th
2019–20	South West Premier (5)	5th	63.60 (Note: The season was postponed and ultimately cancelled due to the COVID-19 pandemic in the United Kingdom with Brixham sitting in 5th, having played 20 games and gained 53 points. The remaining games were calculated on a 'best playing record formula', with Brixham remaining in 5th place with 63.30 points.)			Devon Senior Cup	
2020–21	South West Premier (5)	Cancelled due to COVID-19 pandemic in the United Kingdom.					
2021–22	South West Premier (5)	7th	60				
2022–23	South West Premier (5)	3rd	71				
Green background stands for either league champions (with promotion) or cup winners. Blue background stands for promotion without winning league or losing cup finalists. Pink background stands for relegation.

== Honours ==
- Devon Junior Cup winners (3): 1905, 1909, 1934 (Note: One of Brixham's Devon Junior Cup wins (1934) was won by the reserve side.)
- Devon Senior Cup winners (4): 1922, 1932, 2015, 2017
- Tribute South West Division 1 West champions: 2011–12

== See also ==
- Devon RFU
