= Exeter University RFC =

English rugby union club, based in Exeter, Devon

(England) Exeter University
- Full name: Exeter University Rugby Football Club
- Union: Devon RFU
- Founded: 1860; 166 years ago as St Luke's College
- Location: Exeter, Devon, England
- Ground: Topsham Sports Ground / University Rubber Crumb / Duckes Meadow
- League: National League 2 West
- 2025–26: 12th
Team kit

Official website
- eurfc.co.uk

Exeter University Rugby Football Club (EURFC) is the University of Exeter's rugby club. The men's side has nine sides competing in BUCS competitions, as well as a Saturday XV, currently playing in National League 2 West – a level 4 league in the English rugby union system – following their promotion from South West Premier as champions in 2021–22. The University 1st XV compete in BUCS Super Rugby, the flagship university rugby league in the United Kingdom.

Having finished second in the league, EURFC's BUCS Super Rugby side secured the BUCS National Championship for the first time since 2016, with a 14–13 victory over Durham University in the final, whilst their Saturday XV side secured the South West Premier league title and with it, promotion to National 2 for the first time in the history of the club. In 2022, the club won the Devon Cup for the first time in 41 years, with a 54–32 victory over Exmouth.

The club also has a highly successful women's setup, with two teams competing in BUCS competition. Having won the Women's National Championship in 2018 and 2019, EURFC Women secured a return to the top flight of women's university rugby, after an unbeaten 2021–22 season.

== Current standings ==
2026–27 National League 2 West table
Pos	Team	Pld	W	D	L	PF	PA	PD	TB	LB	Pts	Qualification
1	Redruth	7	7	0	0	304	128	+176	6	0	34	Promotion place
2	Hinckley	7	6	0	1	277	125	+152	6	0	30	Promotion play-off
3	Luctonians	7	6	0	1	271	134	+137	6	0	30	
4	Clifton	7	6	0	1	315	201	+114	6	0	30	
5	Taunton Titans	7	5	0	2	281	156	+125	5	2	27	
6	Old Redcliffians	7	4	0	3	225	212	+13	6	1	23	
7	Cinderford	7	4	0	3	262	282	−20	6	0	22	
8	Lymm	7	4	0	3	205	241	−36	5	1	22	
9	Hornets	7	2	0	5	231	245	−14	5	4	17	
10	Loughborough Students	7	2	0	5	242	287	−45	6	2	16	
11	Barnstaple	7	2	0	5	163	205	−42	3	2	13	
12	Bournville	7	1	0	6	217	421	−204	5	1	10	Relegation play-off
13	Devonport Services	7	0	0	7	157	369	−212	3	1	4	Relegation place
14	Exeter University	7	0	0	7	172	316	−144	3	0	3	Relegation place

Updated to match(es) played on 10 October 2026. Source: National League Rugby
Rules for classification: If teams are level at any stage, tiebreakers are applied in the following order:
1. Number of matches won
2. Number of matches drawn
3. Difference between points for and against
4. Total number of points for
5. Aggregate number of points scored in matches between tied teams
6. Number of matches won excluding the first match, then the second and so on until the tie is settled

== History ==
The origins of the Exeter University Rugby Football Club can be traced back to the old sides of St Luke's College. The College was founded in 1839 with the first rugby match taking place in 1860 against Exeter Grammar School. By 1872, Exeter Rugby Football Club had been formed and the club's inaugural match was against St Luke's College, thus setting the scene for many memorable matches to follow.

By the 1950s college rugby in the United Kingdom had become a major influence upon the game as a whole. In 1957, Devon won the County Championship with St Luke's providing six members of the team. The 1960s and 1970s witnessed regular fixtures between St Luke's College and clubs such as Bristol, Gloucester, Rosslyn Park and Wasps. In 1969 annual matches, home and away, against Loughborough College were established. These games proved to be some of the most exhilarating and exciting matches played during this period and ensured that both sides would be remembered as two of the most powerful student rugby clubs of all time.

When St Luke's College amalgamated with the University of Exeter in 1978, many saw this as an end of an era for student rugby in the south-west of England. Although success has not been as forthcoming as it had been with the St Luke's College teams of old, the list of those students who have gone on to gain honours cannot be ignored. The current crop of players which have been assembled for over a decade, owe their succes to the University's Sports Scholarship recruitment drive and the links which have been forged with Exeter Chiefs Rugby Football Club.

EURFC have enjoyed a fine recent history, with the club winning the BUCS National Championship in 2001 at Twickenham, for the first time in Exeter's history. The club also won the 2nd XV Rugby Championship in 2000 and the BUCS Sevens Competition in 1999. During the same season the Club also reached the finals of the Middlesex Sevens at Twickenham. The latter was a feat that had not been achieved for over sixteen years, and not regularly since the glory days of St Luke's College.

Currently, forty-three current and former students have won full international caps. Numerous others have won A, B, student and Under 20s caps. Many have played for the Barbarians and several for the British and Irish Lions. Former students Richard Hill, John Scott, David Sole and Jeff Squire have all been selected to captain their respective countries. More recently, Sam Skinner (Scotland,) Lasha Jaiani (Georgia) and Christ Tshiunza (Wales) have all made their mark on the international scene, with Tshiunza becoming the first player to make his BUCS Super Rugby and international debuts in the same season.

Off the pitch too, many students have made their mark within the game. In particular, Don Rutherford was the first professional appointment in the Rugby Football Union. He was chosen to be their first Technical Director.

This season has seen Exeter achieve numerous accolades, with the 1st XV securing the BUCS National Championship title, whilst the Fresh 1s and Flair XV also won their respective BUCS leagues. The Saturday league side have also secured promotion to National 2 ahead of the 2022-23 season, the highest league level that the university has competed at.

Christ Tshiunza made his debut for Wales, just weeks after making his university debut against Cardiff University, whilst Dafydd Jenkins has represented the university, as well as Exeter Chiefs in the Gallagher Premiership, Heineken Champions Cup and Premiership Cup.

Oli Burrows, Dan John, Arthur Relton, Archie Hosking, Tom Cairns and Tom Hitchcock all represented Exeter Chiefs in the Premiership Cup, whilst Jake Murray made his debut for Harlequins in the same competition.

Ollie Leatherbarrow and Rob Gordon both represented Scotland U20s in the Six Nations, whilst Will Yarnell, Josh Barton, Fin Richardson and Tom Hitchcock were all selected in the England Students squad to take on France Universities at Kingston Park.

== Honours ==
- Devon Senior Cup Winners (5): 1969, 1970, 1975, 1981, 2022
- BUCS National Championship Winners (3): 2002–03, 2015–16, 2021–22
- Tribute Devon 2 Champions: 2011–12
- Tribute Devon 1 Champions: 2012–13
- Tribute Cornwall/Devon Champions: 2013–14
- Tribute Western Counties West Champions: 2016–17
- BUCS Super Rugby League Champions (2): 2017–18, 2018–19
- South West 1 (East vs West) promotion play-off winner: 2017–18
- South West Premier Champions 2021–22
