= Havill Plate =

Devon Havill Plate
- Sport: Rugby Union
- Instituted: 1972; 54 years ago
- Ceased: 2000; 26 years ago
- Country: England
- Holders: Torrington (1998–99)
- Most titles: Exmouth / Ilfracombe (3 titles)
- Website: Devon RFU

The Havill Plate was an annual rugby union knock-out competition organised by the Devon Rugby Football Union. It was first introduced during the 1971–72 season for clubs that were knocked out of the first round of the Devon Senior Cup with Ilfracombe being the first winners. When the Devon Junior Cup was reintroduced for the 1986–87 season the plate would expand to include teams knocked out of the early rounds of the Junior Cup, until the plate was discontinued after the 1999 final. The Devon RFU have reintroduced similar competitions in recent years although most have been discontinued due to a lack of interest.

== Devon Havill Plate winners ==
Havill Plate Finals
Season	Winner	Score	Runners–up	Venue
1971–72	Ilfracombe	12–6	Plymouth Argaum	
1972–73	Sidmouth		Old Heleans	
1973–74	Paignton			
1974–75	Bideford			
1975–76	Totnes			
1976–77	Exmouth			
1977–78	Paignton			
1978–79	Okehampton			
1979–80	Tiverton			
1980–81	Exmouth			
1981–82	Ivybridge			
1982–83	Exmouth			
1983–84	Ilfracombe			
1984–85	Crediton			
1985–86	Teignmouth			
1986–87	Tavistock	10–0	Plymouth Argaum	Bickleigh Down, Plymouth
1987–88	Plymouth Civil Service			
1988–89	Salcombe			
1989–90	Newton Abbot			
1990–91	Dartmouth	25–10	South Molton	Dartmouth Leisure Centre, Dartmouth
1991–92	Topsham		Dartmouth	
1992–93	Kingsbridge			
1993–94	Ilfracombe			
1994–95	Old Technicians			
1995–96	Wessex	22–11	Newton Abbot	
1996–97	Honiton			
1997–98	Wessex			
1998–99	Torrington			

== Number of wins ==
- Exmouth (3)
- Ilfracombe (3)
- Paignton (2)
- Wessex (2)
- Bideford (1)
- Crediton (1)
- Dartmouth (1)
- Honiton (1)
- Ivybridge (1)
- Kingsbridge (1)
- Newton Abbot (1)
- Okehampton (1)
- Old Technicians (1)
- Plymouth Civil Service (1)
- Salcombe (1)
- Sidmouth (1)
- Tavistock (1)
- Teignmouth (1)
- Tiverton (1)
- Topsham (1)
- Torrington (1)
- Totnes (1)

== See also ==
- Devon RFU
- Devon Senior Cup
- Devon Intermediate Cup
- Devon Junior Cup
- David Butt Memorial Trophy
- English rugby union system
- Rugby union in England
