= Pottington Road Ground =

Rugby field

- Interactive map of Pottington Road Ground
- Location: Pottington Road, Barnstaple, North Devon, EX31 1JH
- Coordinates: 51°04′57″N 4°04′07″W

is a rugby union ground and former greyhound racing stadium in Pottington Road, Barnstaple, North Devon.

== Rugby Union ==
Barnstaple RFC moved to the ground in 1921.

== Greyhound racing ==
The Barnstaple United Services Club brought greyhound racing to Barnstaple over 275 and 375 yards on the United Services Ground during 1931 but the operation moved next door to Pottington Road with the first race meeting held on 9 May 1931.

The racing was independent (unaffiliated to a governing body) and organised by the Barnstaple Greyhound Stadium Ltd, with racing held every Wednesday and Saturday at 7pm during the summer months only. The venue sometimes called the North Devon Greyhound Stadium held races over 375, 400, 525 and 725 yards, with whippets also racing over shorter distances.

The summer racing stopped in 1936 with no renewal of racing found 1937, this could be as a result of the Barnstaple United Services Club selling some of their land to the council to erect a football stadium there in 1937 for Barnstaple Town F.C.
