= Devon RFU Senior Cup =

Devon Senior Cup
- Sport: Rugby Union
- Instituted: 1886; 140 years ago
- Number of teams: 8 (Cup); 4 (Shield)
- Country: England
- Holders: Exeter University (five titles) (2021-22)
- Most titles: Exeter (16 titles)
- Website: Devon RFU

The Devon Senior Cup is an annual rugby union league and cup club competition organized by the Devon Rugby Football Union. It was first introduced in the 1886-87 season and the inaugural competition was won by Tiverton. During the early years of the cup the format changed several times from a knock-out competition to a league format, then to hybrid league/cup, then back to being a knock-out cup once again. The competition also had periods of inactivity, with World War I preventing play for a number of seasons and then the cup being cancelled in the 1930s before being reintroduced for the 1969-70 season when it was won by St. Luke's College (now University of Exeter). The Havill Plate was introduced in the 1970s for teams knocked out of the first round of the cup which would continue until 1999. Competitions similar to the Havill Plate were introduced in 2009 for teams that got knocked out of the earlier stages of the cup were introduced - plate (semi finals) and vase (quarter finals) - but these were discontinued due to a lack of interest by the clubs involved.

The Devon Senior Cup is currently the premier county cup competition for club sides based in Devon that play in tier 5 (South West One) of the English rugby union league system. For 2022-23 the format was two conference divisions of four teams playing three games to determine the top two in each pool, who go through to the semi-finals. The bottom two teams in the pools go through to the Devon Senior Shield, where two semi-finals are played to determine the finalists.

== Devon Senior Cup winners ==
Devon Senior Cup Finals
Season	Winner	Score	Runners–up	Venue
1885-86	Tiverton	2-0	Exeter	(Unofficial)
1886-87	Tiverton		Torquay Athletic RFC	Plainmoor (Unofficial)
1887-88	Tiverton	3-0	Newton Abbot	County Ground, Exeter
1888-89	Devonport Albion	11-0	Exeter	County Ground, Exeter
1889-90	Exeter	10-6	Torquay Athletic	County Ground, Exeter
1890-91	Devonport Albion	N/A (Note: The 1890-91 season saw the competition renamed the Devon League Cup and would take place in the form of a league for the next five seasons.)	RNEC	
1891-92	Devonport Albion	N/A		
1892-93	Devonport Albion	N/A		
1893-94	Barnstaple	N/A		
1894-95	Devonport Albion	N/A	6-2	Torquay Athletic
1895-96	Sidmouth	N/A		
1896-97	Sidmouth	3-0	Totnes	County Ground, Exeter
1897-98	Crediton	5-3	Torquay Albion	South Devon Cricket Ground, Marsh Road, Newton Abbot
1898-1903	No competition			
1904-05	Plymouth	3-0	Exeter	Rectory Field, Plymouth
1905-06	Plymouth	12-4	Paignton	County Ground
1906-07	Torquay Athletic	5-0 (Note: 1907 final was replayed after the first game finished 0-0.)	Devonport Albion	South Devon Cricket Ground, Marsh Road, Newton Abbot
1907-08	Devonport Albion	5-0	Plymouth	Home Park
1908-09	Devonport Albion	3-0	Newton Abbot	Recreation Ground, Torquay
1909-10	Plymouth	6-3	Devonport Albion	Home Park
1910-11	Plymouth	10-0	Newton Abbot	Recreation Ground, Torquay
1911-12	Devonport Albion	27-0 (Note: 1912 final was replayed after first game at Recreation Ground, Torquay finished 0-0.)	Torquay Athletic	
1912-13	Devonport Albion	5-3 (Note: 1913 final was replayed after first game finished 3-3.)	Exmouth	Devonport
1913-14	Devonport Albion	15-3	Exmouth	County Ground
1914-20	No competition due to World War I			
1920-21	Plymouth Albion	11-3	Newton Abbot	Recreation Ground, Torquay
1921-22	Brixham	3-0	Torquay Athletic	South Devon Cricket Ground, Marsh Road, Newton Abbot
1922-23	Newton Abbot	7-0	Torquay Athletic	South Devon Cricket Ground, Marsh Road, Newton Abbot
1923-24	Newton Abbot	7-4 (Note: extra time played after game finished 4-4 after 80 minutes.)	Torquay Athletic	Recreation Ground, Torquay
1924-25	Exmouth	10-0	Newton Abbot	South Devon Cricket Ground, Marsh Road, Newton Abbot
1925-26	Barnstaple	11-3 (Note: 1926 final was replayed after the first game finished 3-3.)	Brixham	County Ground, Exeter
1926-27	Newton Abbot	17-0	Exmouth	County Ground, Exeter
1927-28	Barnstaple	6-3	Brixham	County Ground, Exeter
1928-29	Teignmouth	6-3	Brixham	Recreation Ground, Torquay
1929-30	Sidmouth	3-0	Brixham	Recreation Ground, Torquay
1930-31	Paignton	6-0	Sidmouth	
1931-32	Brixham	9-0	Paignton	Recreation Ground, Torquay
1932-68	No competition			
1968-69	St. Luke's College		Plymouth Albion	Recreation Ground, Torquay
1969-70	St. Luke's College	12-9	Barnstaple	
1970-71	Exeter			
1971-72	Exeter		Torquay Athletic	
1972-73	Exeter			
1973-74	Plymouth Albion	16-6	St. Luke's College	Rectory Field, Plymouth
1974-75	St. Luke's College	25-10	Barnstaple	County Ground, Exeter
1975-76	Exeter	18-12	Torquay Athletic	
1976-77	Plymouth Albion	10-0	Exeter	Beacon Park, Plymouth
1977-78	Exeter	28-13	Sidmouth	County Ground, Exeter
1978-79	Torquay Athletic	15-8	Brixham	Recreation Ground, Torquay
1979-80	Exeter			
1980-81	Exeter University		Exeter	
1981-82	Exeter	9-4	Torquay Athletic	Recreation Ground, Torquay
1982-83	Plymouth Albion	30-13	Devon & Cornwall Police	Beacon Park, Plymouth
1983-84	Plymouth Albion	22-7	Devon & Cornwall Police	Beacon Park, Plymouth
1984-85	Plymouth Albion	12-4	Exeter University	County Ground, Exeter
1985-86	Plymouth Albion	15-6	Exeter	County Ground, Exeter
1986-87	Plymouth Albion	47-12	Devonport Services	Beacon Park, Plymouth
1987-88	Plymouth Albion	32-6	Okehampton	Showfield, Okehampton
1988-89	Exeter	17-9	Barnstaple	Pottington Road, Barnstaple
1989-90	Exeter	26-10	Torquay Athletic	Recreation Ground, Torquay
1990-91	Exeter	18-12	Plymouth Albion	Beacon Park, Plymouth
1991-92	Exeter	30-10	Brixham	County Ground, Exeter
1992-93	Exeter	35-21	Brixham	County Ground, Exeter
1993-94	Exeter	22-12	Plymouth Albion	Beacon Park, Plymouth
1994-95	Exeter	22-3	Brixham	Astley Park, Brixham
1995-96	Exeter	32-6	Barnstaple	Pottington Road, Barnstaple
1996-97	Barnstaple	31-18	Okehampton	Showfield, Okehampton
1997-98	Tiverton	23-14	Torquay Athletic	Recreation Ground, Torquay
1998-99	Barnstaple	20-14	Exeter	Pottington Road, Barnstaple
1999-00	Barnstaple	9-3	Exeter	Pottington Road, Barnstaple
2000-01	Barnstaple	30-18	Brixham	Pottington Road, Barnstaple
2001-02	Barnstaple	25-16	Brixham	Astley Park , Brixham
2002-03	Exmouth		Barnstaple	Pottington Road, Barnstaple
2003-04	Newton Abbot	33-31	Brixham	Astley Park, Brixham
2004-05	Barnstaple	21-0	Cullompton	Stafford Park, Cullompton
2005-06	Exmouth	22-13	Torquay Athletic	Imperial Recreation Ground, Exmouth
2006-07	Torquay Athletic	6-16	Paignton	Queen's Park, Paignton
2007-08	Barnstaple	23-19	Exmouth	Imperial Recreation Ground, Exmouth
2008-09	Barnstaple	21-0	Cullompton	Stafford Park, Cullompton
2009-10	Barnstaple	28-25	Brixham	Astley Park
2010-11	Exmouth	20-15	Newton Abbot	Rackerhayes, Kingsteignton
2011-12	Exmouth	28-15	Brixham	Astley Park, Brixham
2012-13	Exmouth	39-3	Barnstaple	Imperial Recreation Ground, Exmouth
2013-14	Exmouth	31-12	Newton Abbot	Imperial Recreation Ground, Exmouth
2014-15	Brixham	39-31	Newton Abbot	Rackerhayes, Kingsteignton
2015-16	Exmouth	31-25	Brixham	Imperial Recreation Ground, Exmouth
2016-17	Brixham	35-20	Okehampton	Astley Park, Brixham
2017-18	Ivybridge	38-31	Exmouth	Cross-in-Hand, Ivybridge
2018-19	Barnstaple	61-22	Exmouth	Pottington Road, Barnstaple
2021-22	Exeter University	54-32	Exmouth	Imperial Recreation Ground, Exmouth
2022-23	Devonport Services		Brixham	Rectory Field, Plymouth

== Devon Senior Plate winners ==
Devon Senior Plate Finals
Season	Winner	Score	Runners–up	Venue
2009-10	Paignton	28-3	Cullompton	Stafford Park, Cullompton
2010-11	Barnstaple	50-12	Brixham	Pottington Road, Barnstaple

== Devon Senior Shield winners ==
Devon Senior Plate Finals
Season	Winner	Score	Runners–up	Venue
2018-19	Okehampton	24–20	Devonport Services	Showground, Okehampton

== Devon Senior Vase winners ==
Devon Senior Vase Finals
Season	Winner	Score	Runners–up	Venue
2009-10	Tiverton	20-15	Kingsbridge	Coronation Field, Tiverton
2010-11	Cullompton	N/A (Note: Final was awarded to Cullompton as Paignton were unable to raise a side.)	Paignton	Stafford Park, Cullompton

== Number of wins ==
=== Cup ===
- Exeter (16)
- Barnstaple (13)
- Devonport Albion (10)
- Exmouth (8)
- Plymouth Albion (8) (Note: If you include the Devon Cup titles won by Plymouth Albion's parent clubs - Devonport Albion and Plymouth RFC - that merged to create the modern club in the 1920s then they have actually won 23 titles which would make them the most prolific team in the competition's history.)
- Plymouth RFC (5)
- Brixham (4)
- Exeter University (4) (Note: Exeter University's figure includes Devon Cups won by St. Luke's College before it was amalgamated into Exeter University in 1978.)
- Newton Abbot (4)
- Sidmouth (3)
- Torquay Athletic (3)
- Tiverton (3)
- Ivybridge (1)
- Paignton (1)
- Teignmouth (1)

=== Plate ===
- Barnstaple (1)
- Paignton (1)

=== Shield ===
- Okehampton (1)

=== Vase ===
- Cullompton (1)
- Tiverton (1)

== See also ==
- Devon RFU
- Devon Intermediate Cup
- Devon Junior Cup
- David Butt Memorial Trophy
- Havill Plate
- English rugby union system
- Rugby union in England
