= Devon RFU Junior Cup =

English rugby union competition

Devon Junior Cup
- Sport: Rugby Union
- Instituted: 1889; 137 years ago
- Number of teams: 15
- Country: England
- Holders: North Tawton (8th title) (2018–19)
- Most titles: Honiton, North Tawton (8 titles)
- Website: Devon RFU

The Devon Junior Cup is an annual rugby union knock-out club competition organized by the Devon Rugby Football Union. It was first introduced in the 1888–89 season when it was won by Paignton. During the pre-war years the Devon Junior Cup was open to lower ranked teams in the county, along with the reserve sides of the larger clubs such as Exeter and Devonport Albion. Like the senior cup competition, the junior cup has periods of inactivity over its history due to World Wars, and was cancelled towards the end of the 1950s only to return in the 1986–87 season when it was won by Exeter Saracens. The Havill Plate was introduced in the 1970s for teams knocked out of the first round of the Devon Senior Cup but later included clubs knocked out of the early stages of the Junior Cup – it was discontinued after the 1998–99 season.

The Junior Cup is the third cup competition in the county behind the Senior Cup and Intermediate Cup, and is open to club sides based in Devon that play in tier 9 (Devon League 1) of the English rugby union league system, as well as the Devon Merit Tables (outside of the league system). The current format is a knock-out cup with a first round, quarter-finals, semi-finals and final, which is played at the home ground of one of the finalists. Also running alongside is a Plate competition for clubs knocked out of the first round of the Devon Junior Cup. There was also a Vase competition but this has not been contested since 2017.

== Devon Junior Cup winners ==
Devon Junior Cup Finals
Season	Winner	Score	Runners–up	Venue
1888-89	Paignton Scarlet Runners			
1889-90	Melville			
1890-91	Totnes			
1891-92	Dartmouth Athletic			
1892-93	Devonport Albion 'B'			
1893-94	Aller Vale			
1894–95	Sidmouth	3 goals, 2 tries – 0	Ilfracombe	
1895-96	Tiverton Heathcoat			
1896-97	Torquay Juniors			
1897-98	Ilfracombe			
1898-99	Dartmouth Athletic			
1899-1900	Paignton			
1900-01	Argyle Athletic			
1901-02	Teignmouth / Friernhay (Note: The 1902 final between Teignmouth and Friernhay was shared after 3 consecutive 0-0 draws.)	0-0	N/A	
1902-03	Friernhay	4-3	Teignmouth	Newton Abbot
1903-04	Dartmouth Athletic		Exeter Reserves	Newton Abbot
1904-05	Brixham	24-0	Ilfracombe	
1905-06	Exeter Reserves	6-3 (Note: The 1906 final between Exeter Reserves and St. Chad's went into extra time.)	St. Chads	
1906-07	St. Chads			
1907-08	Devonport Ramblers			
1908-09	Brixham	12-0	Seaton	Newton Abbot
1909-10	Kingsteignton			
1910-11	Kingsteignton			
1911-12	Teignmouth			
1912-13	Seaton			
1913-14	North Tawton			
1914-19	No competition due to World War I			
1919-20	Exmouth Reserves			
1920-21	Newton Abbot Reserves			
1921-22	Exmouth Reserves			
1922-23	Kingsteignton			
1923-24	Crediton			
1924-25	Newton Abbot Reserves			
1925-26	Exmouth Reserves		Crediton	
1926-27	Paignton Reserves	9-3	Honiton	
1927-28	Honiton	21-7	Brixham Reserves	
1928-29	Honiton	9-3	Kingsteignton	County Ground, Exeter
1929-30	Honiton	9-5	Brixham Reserves	
1930-31	Kingsteignton			
1931-32	North Tawton			
1932-33	Bideford			
1933-34	Brixham Reserves			
1934-35	Bideford			
1935-36	Withycombe			
1936-37	No competition			
1937-38	Exmouth Reserves			
1938-39	Buckfastleigh			
1939-46	No competition			
1946-47	Crediton			
1947-48	North Tawton			
1948-49	North Tawton			
1949-50	North Tawton / Totnes			
1950-51	North Tawton / Totnes			
1951-52	Totnes			
1952-53	Cullompton			
1953-54	Buckfastleigh			
1954-55	Buckfastleigh			
1955-56	Buckfastleigh			
1956-57	North Tawton			
1957-86	No competition			
1986-87	Exeter Saracens			
1987-88	Ivybridge			
1988-89	Ivybridge			
1989-90	Cullompton			
1990-91	Ivybridge			
1991-92	Paignton			
1992-93	Honiton			
1993-94	Honiton			
1994-95	Ivybridge			
1995-96	Kingsbridge			
1996-97	Kingsbridge	48-0	Newton Abbot	Rackerhayes, Kingsteignton
1997-98	Exmouth			
1998-99	Withycombe			
1999-2000	Exmouth			
2000-01	Kingsbridge			
2001-02	Tavistock			
2002-03	Honiton			
2003-04	Honiton			
2004-05	Honiton	29-3	South Molton	
2005-06	Okehampton	8-3	Cullompton	
2006-07	Cullompton		Teignmouth	
2007-08	Bideford	27-3	Teignmouth	King George's Field, Bideford
2008-09	Exeter Saracens	34-15	Torrington	Exhibition Fields, Exeter
2009-10	Wessex	19-3	Totnes	Borough Park, Totnes
2010-11	Plymouth Barbarians	21-10	Topsham	Keyham Park, Plymouth
2011-12	Wessex	18-11	Newcross	Five Lanes, Kingsteignton
2012-13	South Molton	20-8	Torrington	Unicorn Park, South Molton
2013-14	Old Technicians	13-8	South Molton	Weston Mill, Plymouth
2014-15	Totnes	20-17	North Tawton	Tawmeadow, North Tawton
2015-16	Torrington	24-15	North Tawton	Donnacroft, Torrington
2016-17	Dartmouth	29-11	Totnes	Tawmeadow, North Tawton
2017-18	South Molton	34-13	Topsham	Unicorn Park, South Molton
2018-19	North Tawton	25-10	Exeter Athletic	Taw Meadows, North Tawton

== Devon Junior Plate winners ==
Devon Junior Plate Finals
Season	Winner	Score	Runners–up	Venue
2009-10	North Tawton	41-0	Plympton Victoria	Taw Meadows, North Tawton
2010-11	Wessex	29-19	Dartmouth	Dartmouth Leisure Centre, Dartmouth
2011-12	Plymouth Argaum (Note: Plate was awarded to Plymouth Argaum as OPM were unable to raise a side for the final.)	N/A	Old Plymothian & Mannamedian	N/A
2012-13	Buckfastleigh Ramblers	48-10	Devonport HSOB	Stonehouse Creek, Plymouth
2013-14	Unknown (Note: Final was played between Tamar Saracens and Dartmouth at Ernesettle Road but no result of match can be found.)		Unknown	Ernesettle Lane, Plymouth
2014-15	Plymouth Argaum	N/A (Note: The 2014-15 Plate competition was set up as a round-robin league competition between the 4 losing sides from the second round of the Devon Junior Cup with each side playing home and away.)	Unknown	N/A
2015-16	Tamar Saracens (Note: Details are hard to find but it appears that Tamar Saracens were awarded with the Plate after South Molton were unable to raise a time for the final.)	N/A	South Molton	N/A
2016-17	North Tawton	13-10	Torington	Tawmeadow, North Tawton
2017-18	New Cross	28-10	Devonport HSOB	Unicorn Park, South Molton
2018-19	Ilfracombe	20-3	Salcombe	Brimlands, Ilfracombe

== Devon Junior Vase winners ==
Devon Junior Vase Finals
Season	Winner	Score	Runners–up	Venue
2009-10	Plymouth Barbarians	26-18	Dartmouth	Keyham Park, Plymouth
2010-11	Plymstock Albion Oaks	27-12	Old Plymothian & Mannamedian	King George V Playing Fields, Plymouth
2011-12	North Tawton	24-9	Salcombe	Unicorn Park, North Tawton
2012-13	Old Technicians	20-12	Tamar Saracens	Weston Mill, Plymouth
2013-14	Topsham	18-11	Plymouth Argaum	Bickleigh Down, Plymouth
2014-15	New Cross	37-14	Plymstock Albion Oaks	Horsham Playing Fields, Plymouth
2015-16	New Cross	55-0	Devonport HSOB	Five Lanes, Kingsteignton
2016-17	Exeter Saracens	12-10	Old Technicians	Tawmeadow, North Tawton

== Number of wins ==
=== Cup ===
- Honiton (8)
- North Tawton (8) (Note: Two of North Tawton's cup wins were shared.)
- Exmouth (6) (Note: Four of Exmouth's cup wins were won by the reserve side.)
- Totnes (5) (Note: Two of Totnes's cup wins were shared.)
- Buckfastleigh (4)
- Ivybridge (4)
- Kingsteignton (4)
- Paignton (4) (Note: Paignton's figure includes Devon Junior Cup win by reserve side as well as a win by the Paignton Scarlet Runners, which is an older version of the modern club.)
- Bideford (3)
- Brixham (3) (Note: One of Brixham's cup wins was won by the reserve side.)
- Cullompton (3)
- Dartmouth Athletic (3)
- Kingsbridge (3)
- Crediton (2)
- Exeter Saracens (2)
- Friernhay (2) (Note: One of Friernhay's cup wins was shared.)
- Newton Abbot Reserves (2)
- South Molton (2)
- Teignmouth (2) (Note: One of Teignmouth's cup wins was shared.)
- Wessex (2)
- Withycombe (2)
- Aller Vale (1)
- Argyle Athletic (1)
- Devonport Albion 'B' (1) (Note: This victory was won by Devonport Albion's reserve side. The club would later merge with Plymouth RFC in the 1920s to form Plymouth Albion.)
- Dartmouth (1)
- Devonport Ramblers (1)
- Exeter Reserves (1) (Note: This was won by the reserve side of Exeter RFC (now Exeter Chiefs).)
- Ilfracombe (1)
- Melville (1)
- Okehampton (1)
- Old Technicians (1)
- Plymouth Barbarians (1)
- Seaton (1)
- Sidmouth (1)
- St. Chads (1)
- Tavistock (1)
- Tiverton Heathcoat (1)
- Torquay Athletic Juniors (1)
- Torrington (1)

=== Plate ===
- North Tawton (2)
- Plymouth Argaum (2)
- Buckfastleigh Ramblers (1)
- Ilfracombe (1)
- New Cross (1)
- Tamar Saracens (1)
- Wessex (1)

=== Vase ===
- New Cross (2)
- North Tawton (1)
- Exeter Saracens (1)
- Old Technicians (1)
- Plymouth Barbarians (1)
- Plymstock Albion Oaks (1)
- Topsham (1)

== See also ==
- Devon RFU
- Devon Senior Cup
- Devon Intermediate Cup
- David Butt Memorial Trophy
- Havill Plate
- English rugby union system
- Rugby union in England
