= Jack Arnott =

English rugby union player (born 1993)

- Born: 2 September 1993 (age 33) Plymouth, England
- Height: 1.80 m (5 ft 11 in)
- Weight: 78 kg (12 st 4 lb)
- Occupation: Professional rugby union player

Rugby union career
- Position: Wing
Senior career
Years	Team	Apps	(Points)
2012-	Exeter Chiefs		
International career
Years	Team	Apps	(Points)
- England U16
–	England U18		
–	England U20		

Jack Arnott is a Rugby Union player for Exeter Chiefs in the Aviva Premiership. He made his debut for the club against London Welsh on 28 January 2012. His position of choice is Winger. He has represented England U16, England U18 and is in the current England U20s Squad.

A former member of the Chiefs Academy, Arnott signed his first professional contract with Exeter on 25 May 2012.

Arnott is currently duel registered with Plymouth Albion in the RFU Championship to aid his player development.

Arnott scored a try within 10 seconds of coming on as a substitute on his debut in Exeter's opening game of the 2014/15 season against London Welsh.
