= Jim Roberts (rugby union) =

England international rugby union player

- Full name: James Roberts
- Born: 25 June 1932 Liverpool, England
- Died: 1 November 2020 (aged 88)
- School: Mill Hill School
- University: University of Cambridge

Rugby union career
- Position: Wing
International career
Years	Team	Apps	(Points)
1960–64	England	18	(18)

James Roberts (25 June 1932 – 1 November 2020) was an English international rugby union player.

Born in Liverpool, Roberts was educated at Mill Hill School and the University of Cambridge.

Roberts played with Old Millhillians, Sale, Middlesex and Cambridge University, where he won three blues. He played as a winger for England during the early 1960s, gaining 18 caps. His six England tries included two on debut against Wales at Twickenham in 1960. He played on England's 1960 and 1963 Five Nations title-winning sides. After opting out of the 1963 tour of Australasia, Roberts was capped a final time in a 1964 Test against the All Blacks at Twickenham.

== See also ==
- List of England national rugby union players
