= Devon Rugby Football Union =

(England) Devon RFU
- Full name: Devon Rugby Football Union
- Union: RFU
- Founded: 1877; 149 years ago
- Region: Devon
- President: John Drew
Team kit

Official website
- www.devonrfu.com

The Devon Rugby Football Union is the governing body for the sport of rugby union in the county of Devon in England. The union is the constituent body of the Rugby Football Union (RFU) for Devon, and administers and organises rugby union clubs and competitions in the county. It also administers the Devon county rugby representative teams.

== History ==
The first rugby team representing Devon was formed in 1877 but was solely a team with no organisation role. The Devon RFU was formed, as the Devon County Football Club, in 1881. Devon were the first opponents of The Original All Blacks during their famous 1905-6 tour. They lost 55–4.

== Devon senior men's county side ==
The Devon senior men's county side currently play in the Bill Beaumont Division 1 South. Historically, they are one of the strongest counties in the competition having won it multiple times although they have not won a trophy since 2007.

Honours:

- County Championship Cup winners (10): 1899, 1901, 1906, 1907, 1911, 1912, 1957, 2004, 2005, 2007

== Affiliated clubs ==
There are currently 49 clubs affiliated with the Devon RFU, most of which have teams at both senior and junior level. The majority of teams are in Devon but a couple are based in Cornwall.

- Barnstaple
- Bideford
- Brixham
- Buckfastleigh Ramblers
- Crediton
- Cullompton
- Dartmouth
- Devonport HSOB
- Devonport Services
- Exeter Chiefs
- Exeter Engineers
- Exeter Saracens
- Exeter University
- Exeter Youth (juniors only)
- Exmouth
- Honiton
- Ilfracombe
- Ivybridge
- Kingsbridge
- New Cross
- Newton Abbot
- North Tawton
- Okehampton
- Old Plymothian & Mannamedian
- Old Technicians
- Paignton
- Peninsula Medical School
- Plymouth Albion
- Plymouth Argaum
- Plymouth University
- Plympton Victoria
- Plymstock Albion Oaks
- Salcombe
- Saltash (Note: Saltash are based in Cornwall and are joint members of both the Cornwall RFU and Devon RFU.)
- Sidmouth
- South Molton
- St Columba & Torpoint (Note: St Columba & Torpoint are based in Cornwall but belong to the Devon RFU.)
- Tamar Saracens
- Tavistock
- Teignmouth
- Tiverton
- Topsham
- Torquay Athletic
- Torrington
- Totnes
- University of St Mark & St John
- Wessex
- Withycombe
- Westcountry Wasps

== County club competitions ==
The Devon RFU currently runs the following competitions for club sides based in Devon:

=== Leagues ===
- Tribute Cornwall/Devon (alongside Cornwall RFU) - league ranked at tier 8 of the English rugby union system for clubs that are based in either Cornwall or Devon
- Devon League 1 - tier 9 league for Devon clubs

=== Cups ===
- Devon Senior Cup - founded in 1888, open to clubs at tiers 5 of the English rugby union system
- Devon Shield - founded in 2018, open to clubs at tier 6
- Devon Intermediate Cup - founded in 2009, open to clubs at tiers 7–8
- Devon Junior Cup - founded in 1932, open to clubs at tiers 9–10
- David Butt Memorial Trophy - founded in 2016, pre-season cup for clubs at tiers 9–10

=== Discontinued competitions ===
- Havill Plate - knockout cup competition that ran between 1971 and 1999. Initially, for sides knocked out of early rounds of the Devon Senior Cup but would later expand to also include clubs knocked out the Junior Cup
- Devon League 2 - tier 10 league that ran between 1987 and 2018.
- Devon League 3 - tier 11 league that ran between 1996 and 2003.

== See also ==
- South West Division
- English rugby union system
