= Gordon Bendon =

English rugby union player

- Full name: Gordon John Bendon
- Born: 9 April 1929 Lambeth, London, England
- Died: 18 January 2001 (aged 71) Kingston-upon-Thames, London, England
- School: King's College School

Rugby union career
- Position: Prop
International career
Years	Team	Apps	(Points)
1959	England	4	(0)

Gordon John Bendon (9 April 1929 – 18 January 2001) was an English international rugby union player.

Born in Lambeth, Bendon was educated at King's College School in Wimbledon, London.

Bendon spent his entire career with Wasps, which he joined as a back-row forward aged 17, before being made to play prop and making that position his own. He was a Middlesex county representative.

In 1959, Bendon was capped four times playing for England in the Five Nations Championship.

Bendon was married to actress Adrienne Scott, the daughter of film producer Edwin J. Fancey.

== See also ==
- List of England national rugby union players
