= John Leleu =

Wales international rugby union player

- Born: 13 March 1935 (age 91) Bristol, England
- School: Bristol Grammar School

Rugby union career
- Position: Flanker
International career
Years	Team	Apps	(Points)
1959–60	Wales	4	(0)

John Leleu (born 13 March 1935) is a Welsh former international rugby union player.

Leleu was born in Bristol and educated at Bristol Grammar School.

An open-side flanker, Leleu played his early rugby with London Welsh and won a County Championship with Middlesex in 1956, before moving on to Swansea. He gained four Wales caps, debuting in a win over England in 1959 and making his last appearance the following year against the touring Springboks.

== See also ==
- List of Wales national rugby union players
