= Peter Ryan (rugby union, born 1930) =

English international rugby union player (1930–2026)

- Full name: Peter Henry Ryan
- Born: 1 October 1930 Bucklow, England
- Died: 24 January 2026 (aged 95)
- School: Harrow School
- University: University of Cambridge

Rugby union career
- Position: Wing-forward
International career
Years	Team	Apps	(Points)
1955	England	2	(0)

Peter Henry Ryan (1 October 1930 – 24 January 2026) was an English international rugby union player.

== Biography ==
Ryan was head boy and football captain at Harrow School, where he also made the school's cricket XI and rugby XV.

A wing-forward, Ryan read engineering at the University of Cambridge and in 1953 scored two tries against the touring All Blacks as a member of the first XV. He captained London club Richmond.

Ryan, capped twice by England, played the opening two fixtures of the 1955 Five Nations Championship, a loss to Wales at Cardiff Arms Park and a draw against Ireland at Lansdowne Road.

Ryan died on 24 January 2026, at the age of 95.

== See also ==
- List of England national rugby union players
