= Barnstaple RFC =

English rugby union club, based in Devon

(England) Barnstaple RFC
- Full name: Barnstaple Rugby Football Club
- Union: Devon RFU
- Founded: 1877; 149 years ago
- Location: Barnstaple, Devon, England
- Ground: Pottington Road (Capacity: 2,000 (575 seats))
- Chairman: Paul Shaddick
- President: Trevor Edwards
- Coach: (England) Winston James
- Captain: (England) Brandon Moore
- League: National League 2 West
- 2025–26: 7th
Team kit

Official website
- www.barnstaplerugby.co.uk

Barnstaple Rugby Football Club was established in 1877 and is a rugby union club based in Barnstaple, Devon. The club's first team play in the 4th tier of the English rugby union system, National League 2 West following their promotion from Regional 1 South West in 2024–25. The first team are called the Chiefs, and there are also 2nd and 3rd teams (Athletic and Buccaneers), a veterans side for players aged 35 and above, a number of youth teams from under-7s to under-18s (colts), and a girls side. The club colours are red and white and their nickname is Barum.

The clubs rivals are Bideford RFC, with an annual festive fixture played between the sides that attracts good crowds, despite the clubs currently playing in different divisions. Bideford last won a first XV fixture against Barnstaple in an Easter weekend friendly in 1995.

== History ==
Barnstaple Rugby Football Club was officially founded in 1877 at a meeting held at the Fortescue hotel. The first Chairman of the club was Mr W. A. Bilney, the first captain Mr W. H. TOLLER, and games in the early days were played at Rumsam. The club won silverware in 1894 when they claimed the Devon League Cup, becoming one of the strongest clubs in the county, forming a rivalry with Devonport Albion, and producing two international players for England - Charlie Harper and Charles Thomas. During the 1896–97 season Barnstaple were crowned 'Champions of the West' and claimed notable victories against the likes of Llanelli and Saracens. In 1921 Barnstaple moved from Rumsam to the clubs present Pottington Road Ground at Pottington Road.

With the advent of the leagues in 1987, Barnstaple found themselves placed at tier 6 of the English rugby union league system in what was then known as South West 2. By the mid-1990s the club had achieved promotion to South West 1 where they would remain for over a decade. During this period they also became one of the top club sides in Devon winning five county cups in this period, including four in a row between 1998 and 2002. This period of success came to an end when Barnstaple suffered consecutive relegations to fall to the lowest level in the club's history so far, dropping to Western Counties West (tier 7) by 2005. Thankfully, the club quickly righted itself and three seasons (and two promotions) later found themselves back in South West 1, following a 17-6 victory over Salisbury RFC in a promotion playoff played at Pottington Road. This climb back up the leagues also coincided with repeated Devon Cup success, with four titles won in a row between 2008 and 2011. In 2007, Jerry Collins, former New Zealand captain, played a game for Barnstaple's 2nd team while visiting family in the Devon town, and later wore the club's socks when playing for the Barbarians against South Africa on 1 December 2007.

Barnstaple stabilised itself in tier 5 as it became known as National League 3 South West. The club continued to play in this division up until the 2015–16 season when they won the promotion play-off game away at Tonbridge Juddians, reaching National League 2 South, which at tier 4 was the highest level reached in the club's league history to date. In 2016–17 Barnstaple finished 14th of 16 teams in the division, but were reprieved from relegation by the collapse of London Welsh in the RFU Championship. Barnstaple recorded 9 wins and 1 draw from 30 games, despite having lost 7 of their first 8 games of the season, as they struggled to adjust to the higher standard of rugby in the national leagues. The end of this season saw the retirement of veteran loosehead prop Mark Berry, who debuted during the Devon Cup winning season of 1998.

In 2017–18 Barnstaple again finished in 14th place, this time being relegated to (the newly named) South West Premier. Relegation came despite Barnstaple winning 10 games and drawing one, meaning they recorded more wins than each of the two teams placed immediately above them. A lack of try bonus points proved costly, as did home defeats to Cinderford and Chinnor, who finished first and second in the league respectively. In both games Barnstaple led after 80 minutes were played, but lost to last minute scores by the visitors. The season was also notable for including the 250th first team appearance of captain Winston James and the 200th for Will Topps.

Back at level 5 of the RFU's pyramid in 2018–19, Barnstaple bounced back well and finished the season in second place behind champions Bournemouth. This qualified Barnstaple for another promotion play-off, this time in Essex at Westcliff RFC. However, the trip was not a fruitful one, with a depleted Barnstaple side losing heavily. Barnstaple did lift silverware this season however, winning the Devon Cup final at home against Exmouth thanks in part to hat tricks from Winston James and Will Topps.

Having remained in the South West Premier division in 2019–20 Barnstaple again mounted a promotion bid and were top of the table, requiring 8 match points from their remaining three games (a possible 15 points) when the global pandemic Coronavirus caused the suspension of all rugby in England on 16 March. Barnstaple were also top of the Devon Senior Cup standings and in prime position to secure a second successive home final at the time of the suspension. Following the league restructuring of National 2 South into two leagues West and East, the 2022–23 season saw Barnstaple Chiefs playing along the M5 corridor in National 2 West while Barnstaple Athletic found themselves playing in a competitive league for the first time as they began the 2022–23 season in Counties 2 Tribute Devon. Notably, the new 1st XV head coach was Winston James, the youngest club captain in the club's history, who had been forced to retire early through injury. Unfortunately the Chiefs finished the season at the foot of the table and were relegated.

In 2023-24 Barnstaple came up short in their quest for promotion back to the national league, finishing the season in 2nd place in Tribute Regional 1 South West, the fifth tier of English rugby. However, the season ended on a high note, with the 1st XV reaching the final of the Papa John's National Cup, contested by the best teams playing at Level 5 of the pyramid. The final game ended 35-35, with opponents Heath RUFC, from Yorkshire, winning on try count back. The game was notable for being the final appearance of club stalwarts Adam Lloyd and Will Topps, the latter of whom played 304 games for the club, scoring 124 tries.

== Ground ==
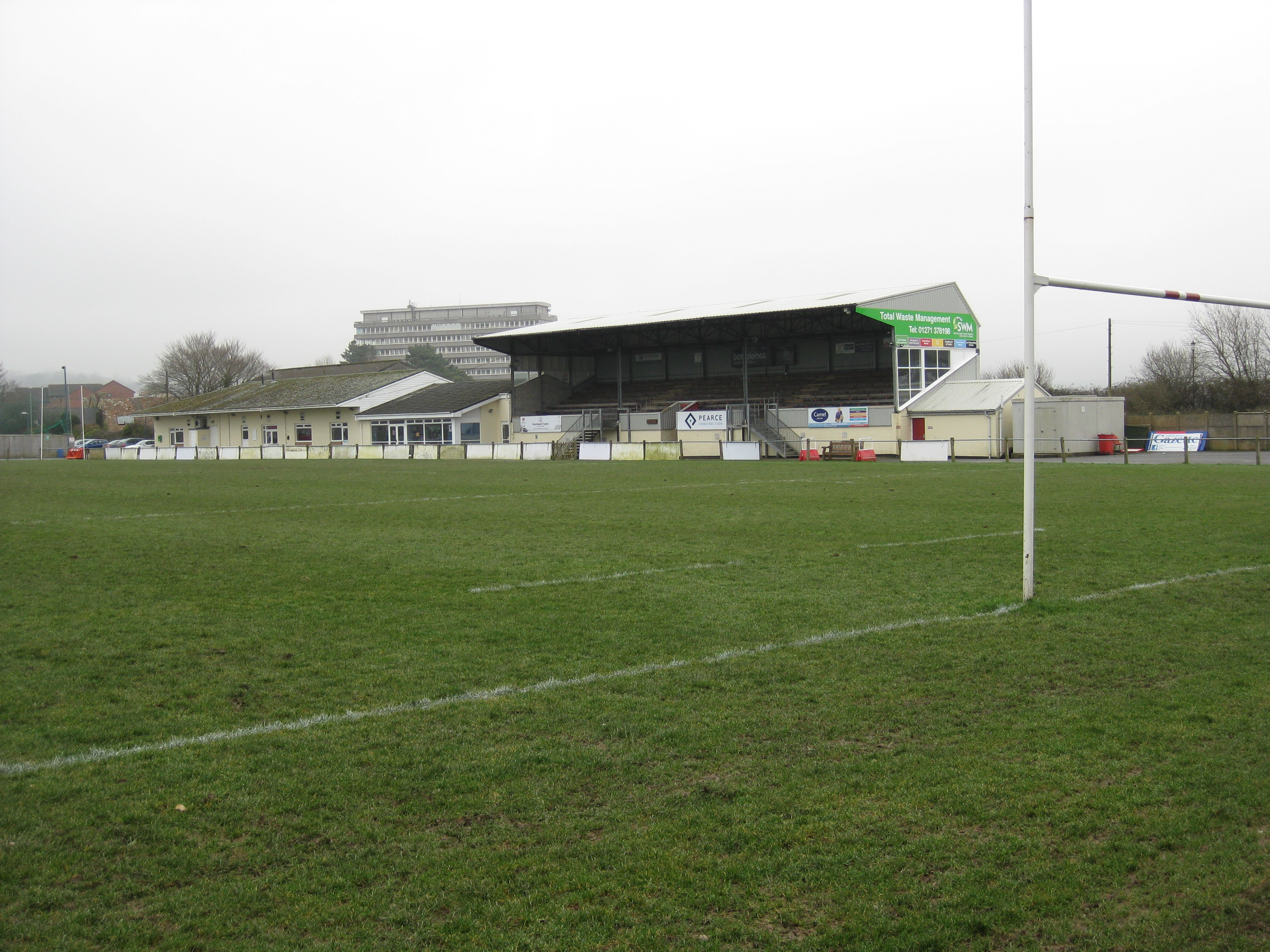
Main stand and club-house at Pottington Road, home of Barnstaple RFC

Barnstaple's ground of Pottington Road is on the road of the same name, next door to Barnstaple Town Football Club. It is located in town on the north bank of the River Taw, and is about 20–30 minutes' walk from Barnstaple railway station, which is across the river to the south. The rugby ground consists of a main stand next to the club-house, a smaller stand on the opposite side, and along with the main pitch there are three alternative pitches for second XV and colts games, as well as a couple of smaller pitches suitable for younger age ranges/minis. Parking is available at the ground for 100+ cars but space can be limited so alternative parking nearby in town followed by a short walk may be necessary on busy days. The current capacity of the ground is approximately 2,000, which includes around 575 seated (450 in the main stand, 150 in the stand opposite), with the rest standing. This capacity figure is representative of the sell-out crowd experienced against local rivals Bideford Rugby Football Club in the 2016 festive fixture between the two sides.

== Season summary ==
Season	League			National Cup(s)		County Cup(s)	
Season	Competition/Level	Position	Points	Competition	Performance	Competition	Performance
1987–88	South West 2 (6)						
1988–89	South West 2 (6)						
1989–90	South West 2 (6)			Pilkington Cup	2nd Round		
1990–91	South West 2 (6)						
1991–92	South West 2 (6)			Pilkington Cup	1st Round		
1992–93	South West 2 (6)	2nd (promoted)					
1993–94	South West 1 (6) (Note: Although Barnstaple were promoted from South West 2 into South West 1, the introduction of Courage League Division 5 by the RFU meant that South West 1 was reduced to a level 6 league.)						
1994–95	South West 1 (6)						
1995–96	South West 1 (6)						
1996–97	South West 1 (5) (Note: The cancellation of Courage League Division 5 at the end of the 1995-96 season meant that South West 1 once more became a level 5 league.)	4th	28	Pilkington Cup	3rd Round	Devon Senior Cup	Winners
1997–98	South West 1 (5)	6th	23	Tetley's Bitter Cup	1st Round		
1998–99	South West 1 (5)	3rd	36	Tetley's Intermediate Cup	Semi-finals	Devon Senior Cup	Winners
1999–00	South West 1 (5)	4th	30	Tetley's Bitter Cup	1st Round	Devon Senior Cup	Winners
2000–01	South West 1 (5)	4th	24	Tetley's Bitter Cup	2nd Round	Devon Senior Cup	Winners
2001–02	South West 1 (5)	3rd	28	Powergen Cup	1st Round	Devon Senior Cup	Winners
2002–03	South West 1 (5)	4th	25	Powergen Cup	1st Round	Devon Senior Cup	Runners up
2003–04	South West 1 (5)	11th (relegated)	11	Powergen Intermediate Cup			
2004–05	South West 2 West (6)	12th (relegated)	11			Devon Senior Cup	Winners
2005–06	Western Counties West (7)	3rd	32				
2006–07	Western Counties West (7)	1st (promoted)	44	EDF Energy Senior Vase			
2007–08	South West 2 West (6)	2nd (promoted via playoff)	36	EDF Energy Intermediate Cup	1st Round	Devon Senior Cup	Winners
2008–09	South West 1 (5)	7th	20	EDF Energy Trophy	2nd Round	Devon Senior Cup	Winners
2009–10	National 3 South West (5) (Note: RFU restructuring for the 2009–10 would see South West 1 be renamed as National League 3 South West.)	11th	49 (Note: The 2009–10 season would see the introduction of bonus points into tier 5 English rugby union.)			Devon Senior Cup	Winners
2010–11	National 3 South West (5)	11th	49			Devon Senior Plate	Winners
2011–12	National 3 South West (5)	5th	81			Devon Senior Cup	Semi-finals
2012–13	National 3 South West (5)	10th	58			Devon Senior Cup	Runners up
2013–14	National 3 South West (5)	8th	63			Devon Senior Cup	Semi-finals
2014–15	National 3 South West (5)	8th	63			Devon Senior Cup	1st Round
2015–16	National 3 South West (5)	2nd (promoted via playoff)	98			Devon Senior Cup	1st Round
2016–17	National 2 South (4)	14th (Note: London Welsh went into liquidation during the 2016–17 season leading to an imbalance of teams throughout the league structure. This meant that there was one less demotion per level in the English rugby union system, which in turn saved 14th placed Barnstaple from relegation.)	51				
2017–18	National 2 South (4)	14th (relegated)	55				
2018–19	South West Premier (5) (Note: From the 2017–18 season National League 3 South West would be renamed South West Premier.)	2nd (lost playoff)	91			Devon Senior Cup	Winners
2019–20	South West Premier (5)	1st (promoted)	88.69 (Note: The season was postponed and ultimately cancelled due to the COVID-19 pandemic in the United Kingdom with Barnstaple sitting in 1st, having played 21 games and gained 77 points. The remaining games were calculated on a 'best playing record formula', with Barnstaple remaining in 1st place with 88.69 points.)			Devon Senior Cup	
2020–21	National 2 South (4)	Cancelled due to COVID-19 pandemic in the United Kingdom.					
2021–22	National 2 South (4)	16th	18				
2022–23	National 2 South (4)	13th	36				
2023–24	Regional 1 South West (4)	2nd	88	Papa Johns National Trophy	Runners Up		
2024–25	Regional 1 South West (4)	1st	95	Papa Johns National Trophy	2nd Round	Devon Senior Cup	Winners
Green background stands for either league champions (with promotion) or cup winners. Blue background stands for promotion without winning league or losing cup finalists. Pink background stands for relegation.

== Honours ==
- Devon Senior Cup winners (13): 1894, 1926, 1928, 1997, 1999, 2000, 2001, 2002, 2005, 2008, 2009, 2010, 2019
- Western Counties West champions: 2006–07
- South West 2 (east v west) promotion play-off winner: 2007–08
- Devon Senior Plate winner: 2011
- National League 3 (south-east v south-west) promotion play-off winner: 2015–16
- South West Premier champions (level 5): 2019–20
- Regional 1 South West (level 5): 2024–25

== Current standings ==
2026–27 National League 2 West table
Pos	Team	Pld	W	D	L	PF	PA	PD	TB	LB	Pts	Qualification
1	Redruth	6	6	0	0	265	121	+144	5	0	29	Promotion place
2	Taunton Titans	6	5	0	1	264	132	+132	5	1	26	Promotion play-off
3	Hinckley	6	5	0	1	253	108	+145	5	0	25	
4	Luctonians	6	5	0	1	198	129	+69	5	0	25	
5	Clifton	6	5	0	1	240	189	+51	5	0	25	
6	Lymm	6	4	0	2	198	202	−4	5	1	22	
7	Old Redcliffians	6	3	0	3	194	188	+6	5	1	18	
8	Cinderford	6	3	0	3	222	250	−28	5	0	17	
9	Loughborough Students	6	2	0	4	197	236	−39	5	1	14	
10	Hornets	6	1	0	5	180	200	−20	4	4	12	
11	Barnstaple	6	2	0	4	139	174	−35	2	1	11	
12	Bournville	6	1	0	5	212	348	−136	5	1	10	Relegation play-off
13	Devonport Services	6	0	0	6	145	294	−149	3	1	4	Relegation place
14	Exeter University	6	0	0	6	140	276	−136	2	0	2	Relegation place

Updated to match(es) played on 5 September 2026. Source: National League Rugby
Rules for classification: If teams are level at any stage, tiebreakers are applied in the following order:
1. Number of matches won
2. Number of matches drawn
3. Difference between points for and against
4. Total number of points for
5. Aggregate number of points scored in matches between tied teams
6. Number of matches won excluding the first match, then the second and so on until the tie is settled

== Notable former players ==
- Jerry Collins – New Zealand All Black's international 2007 who was capped 45 times by the All blacks
- Ben Vellacott – Edinburgh Rugby and Scotland international
- Cecil Pritchard – capped 8 times by Wales in the 1920s. Played part of his career at Barnstaple when he moved to the south-west from his home country. Died in 1966.
- Danny Southworth – Cardiff Rugby and Wales international
- (England) Frazer Honey – Camborne RFC

== See also ==
- Devon RFU
