= Rugby union bonus points system =

Group tournament ranking system

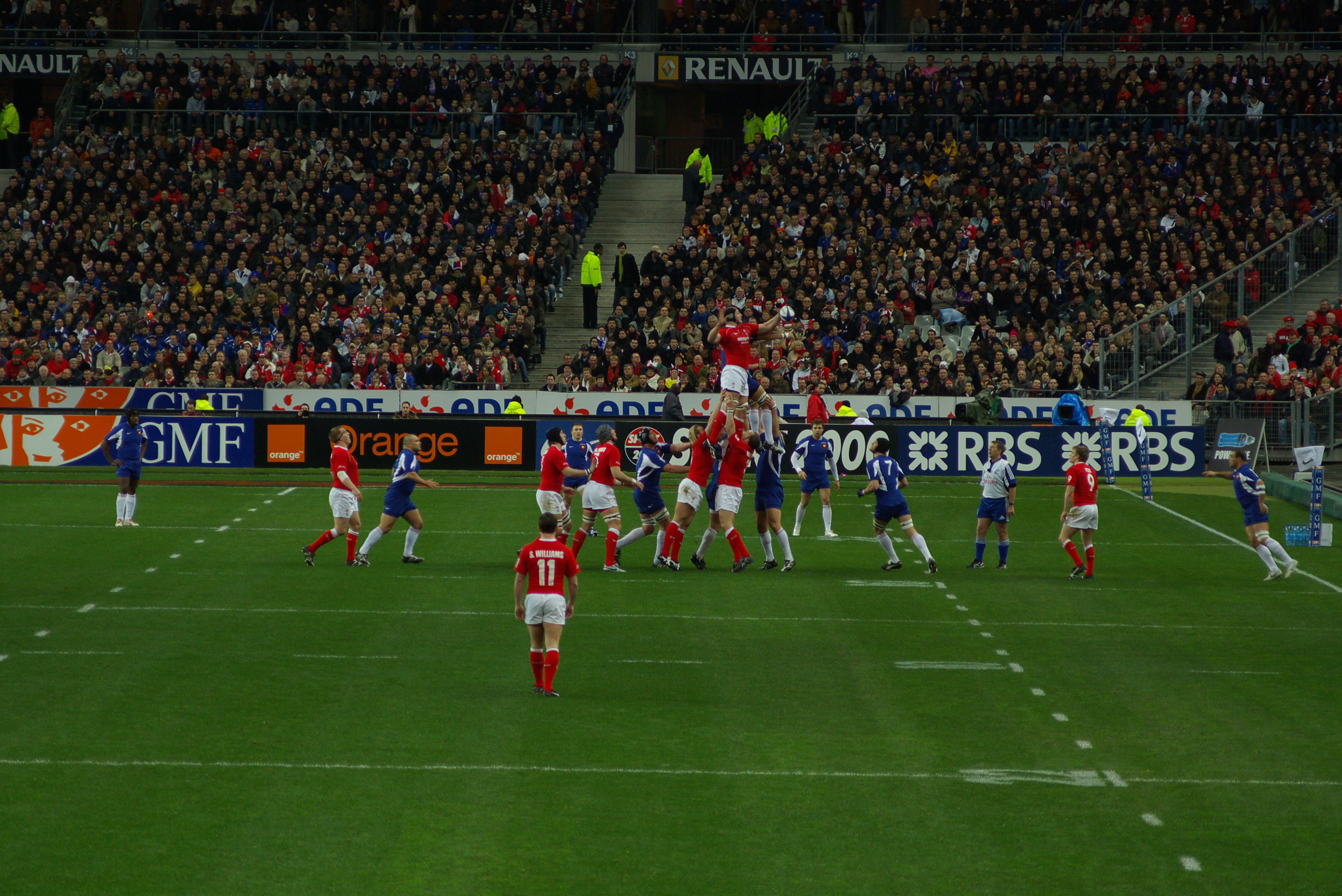
France vs Wales, 6 Nations 2007, Paris

Bonus points are extra league points awarded in rugby union competitions, in addition to the points for winning or drawing a match.

== Systems ==
The most common point system is:

- 4 points for winning a match
- 2 points for drawing a match
- 0 points for losing a match
- 1 losing bonus point for losing by 7 points (or fewer)
- 1 try bonus point for scoring (at least) 4 tries, regardless of the outcome.

In this system, winning teams get 4 or 5 points; drawing teams 2 or 3 points; and losing teams between 0 and 2 points.

This format was created for New Zealand's National Provincial Championship, in 1995 and subsequently adopted in the inaugural Super 12 in 1996. It was first used at the Rugby World Cup in 2003, and has been the staple for international and club competition since.

=== France ===
The French professional league, Ligue Nationale de Rugby (LNR), uses a similar system in its two competitions, the Top 14 and Rugby Pro D2. After trialling the system in 2007–08, LNR adopted the new system permanently.

The French system awards points:

- 4 points for a win.
- 2 points for a draw.
- 1 "bonus" point for winning while scoring at least 3 more tries than the opponent.
- 1 "bonus" point for losing by no more than a specified margin. Through the 2013–14 season, the margin was 7 points; starting in 2014–15, the margin was reduced to 5.

This system prevents a losing team from picking up two bonus points in the same match, as is possible under the normal system.

=== SANZAAR ===
In 2016, Super Rugby switched from the standard system to the original French system, i.e.

- 4 points for a win.
- 2 points for a draw.
- 1 bonus point for scoring at least 3 more tries than the opponent.
- 1 bonus point for losing by no more than 7 points (the value of a converted try).

SANZAAR extended this change to The Rugby Championship in 2017.

=== Six Nations ===
The 2017 Six Nations Championship used the standard bonus points system on a trial basis, with the added feature that a team winning the Grand Slam would earn three extra bonus points to ensure that a grand slam winning team is guaranteed to win the tournament. Six Nations tournaments also award a bonus point to any team that scores four tries or more, regardless of the outcome, meaning that a losing team can score two points if they score four tries and lose by seven points or fewer.

== Rugby league ==
From 2007 season through to 2014, the Championship and League 1 (the two levels below Super League), primarily in England but also featuring teams in France and Wales during this time frame, gave 3 points for a win, 2 for a draw, and 1 for a loss by 12 points or fewer (this amounts to two converted tries in rugby league, which gives four points for a try instead of the five points awarded in union). This changed in the 2015 season when the points system was brought into line with that of Super League, thereby standardising the system across Britain's three professional Rugby League divisions, abandoning the bonus points system.
