= Bideford RFC =

English Rugby union team

Bideford
- Full name: Bideford Rugby Football Club
- Union: Devon RFU
- Nickname: The Chiefs
- Founded: 1926; 100 years ago
- Location: Bideford, Devon, England
- Ground: King George's Field (Capacity: 2,000)
- Chairman: Matthew Anderson-Retter
- President: Lester Bird
- Coach: Kevin Booth
- Captain: Nick Bone
- League: [[Counties 2 Devon]
- [[Counties 2 Devon 2025/26: 2nd Counties 2 Devon)
Team kit

Official website
- www.bidefordrugby.co.uk

Bideford RFC is an English Rugby union team formed in 1926. The club is based in Bideford, Devon and operates three senior men's teams, as well as multiple youth, ladies and mini teams. The first team, the Chiefs play their centennial year Counties 2 Devon in 2026/27 following their 2nd place finish in 2025/26. The club has a longstanding rivalry with its neighbour, Barnstaple, and the traditional Boxing Day fixture between the two sides often attracts crowds in excess of a thousand supporters. Bideford plays home games at King George's Field. 2025 saw the Boxing Day fixture as a charity match raising monies for North Devon Hospice and Children’s Hospice South West after some endorsements from rugby celebrities such as Jonny Wilkinson and current England manager Richard Hill.

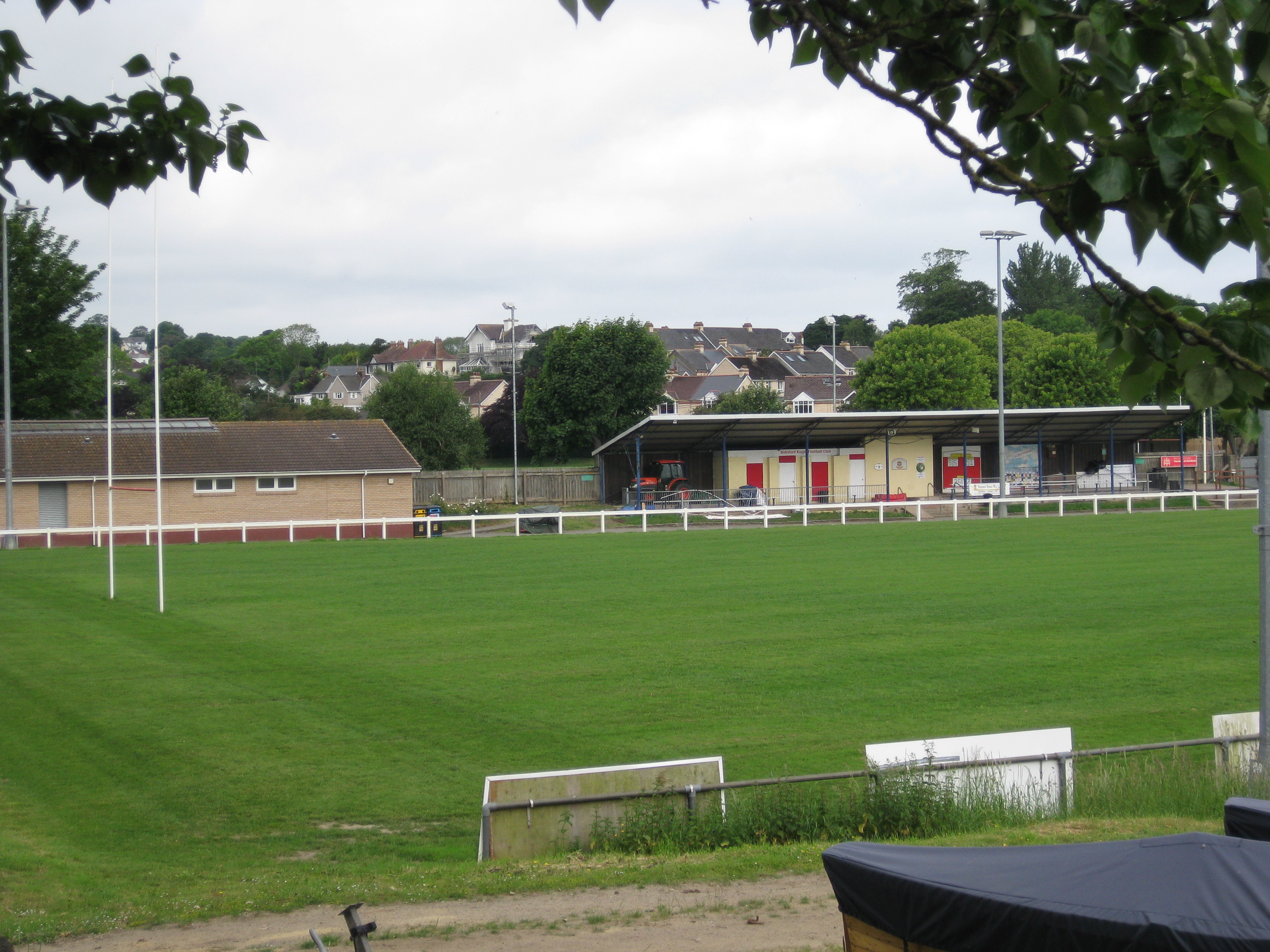
King George's Field, home of Bideford RFC

== History ==
=== Early days ===
Bideford was founded in 1926 by local players who had, until then, played for its neighbour, Barnstaple RFC. It was the beginning of a long sporting rivalry between the clubs. Bideford played their first game at Victoria Park against a Barnstaple reserve side. Victoria Park remained Bideford's home ground until 1929 when they moved to the Sports Ground. This ground was shared with the local football side, Bideford AFC. During the 1930s, the club had a degree of success in the Devon Junior Cup (the secondary cup competition for men's rugby at the time), winning the competition in 1933 and 1935. In 1969, Bideford left the Sports Ground and moved to King George's Field, where they currently play. They won the Havill Plate in 1975.

=== League rugby ===
When leagues were introduced for the 1987–88 season, Bideford was placed in Courage Cornwall/Devon, a regional league for Cornish and Devon-based clubs ranked in tier 8 of the English league system. In 1992, after four seasons in this division, the club finished as champions and thus were promoted to Tribute Western Counties West. They remained part of Tribute Western Counties West for six years. In the 1997–98 season, they finished last and were relegated, returning to Cornwall/Devon. In 2001, Bideford achieved promotion as runners-up and returned to the Tribute Western Counties West league. This promotion was short-lived; they were relegated the following year after a poor league campaign which saw just 1 win in 22 games. Two years later, Bideford sunk to their lowest ever league ranking and were thus relegated at the end of the 2004–05 season to Devon 1.

The 2006–07 season saw Bideford start to rebuild, and they finished second in the league behind champions Teignmouth, qualifying for a promotion play-off against the runners-up from Cornwall League 1, Liskeard-Looe. Due to a better league record, Bideford had home advantage, and they managed a win, allowing a return to Cornwall/Devon. The next year saw Bideford not only stave off relegation with a mid-table finish, but also win the Devon Junior Cup for the third time, beating Teignmouth 23–7 in the final held at King George's Field. Bideford won the league and cup double during the 2010–11 season, first winning Tribute Devon/Cornwall with 25 wins from 26 games and then outclassing Crediton, 45–12 away, in the final of the Devon Intermediate Cup. A second intermediate cup victory followed the next year as Bideford beat Okehampton 51–17 in front of a home crowd of around 400 supporters.

In 2013, Bideford finished second in Western Counties West after losing a competitive title battle with eventual champions St Austell and qualified for the promotion play-off against Western Counties North runners-up, Wells. Despite having to travel to Somerset, Bideford survived a late fight back to clinch promotion. This promotion saw Bideford play in Tribute South West 1 West for the 2013–14 season, which, at tier 6, is the highest level the club have played at. In 2017–18 Bideford were relegated from Tribute South West 1 West after three years in the division, finishing second bottom to drop back down to Tribute Western Counties West.

== Ground ==
Bideford play at King George's Fields next to Victoria Park on the western banks of the River Torridge, roughly 5 minutes walk from the town centre. Unfortunately as there is no longer a railway station in the town, away supporters will have to rely on car or bus to get to the ground, although there is plenty of parking near by.

The rugby ground consists of an enclosed main pitch with club house and covered standing terrace. There are also several training pitches adjoining Victoria Park for 2nd XV and junior fixtures. The current capacity of the main ground is around 2,000 (all standing), which has been reached on several occasions during the traditional Boxing Day fixture against neighbours Barnstaple.

== Season summary ==
Season	League			National Cup(s)		County Cup(s)	
Season	Competition/Level	Position	Points	Competition	Performance	Competition	Performance
1987–88	Cornwall/Devon (8)	8th	6				
1988–89	Cornwall/Devon (8)	5th	10				
1989–90	Cornwall/Devon (8)						
1990–91	Cornwall/Devon (8)						
1991–92	Cornwall/Devon (8)	1st (promoted)					
1992–93	Western Counties (7)						
1993–94	Western Counties (7) (Note: RFU restructuring due to creating of Courage League Division 5 meant that Western Counties was renamed as South West 2 for the 1993–94 season.)						
1994–95	Western Counties (7)						
1995–96	Western Counties (7)	10th	6				
1996–97	Western Counties West (7) (Note: League restructuring meant that Western Counties was split into Western Counties West and Western Counties West.)	6th	18				
1997–98	Western Counties West (7)	10th (relegated)	8				
1998–99	Cornwall/Devon (8)	7th	16				
1999–00	Cornwall/Devon (8)	10th (Note: Despite finishing bottom the 1999–00 Cornwall/Devon league, Bideford escaped the drop as there was no relegation that year.)	8				
2000–01	Cornwall/Devon (8)	2nd (promoted)	24				
2001–02	Western Counties West (7)	3rd	26				
2002–03	Western Counties West (7)	10th (relegated)	2				
2003–04	Cornwall/Devon (8)	9th	16				
2004–05	Cornwall/Devon (8)	12th (relegated)	2				
2005–06	Devon 1 (9)	5th	25	Powergen Junior Vase			
2006–07	Devon 1 (9)	2nd (promoted via playoff)	40	EDF Energy Junior Vase	6th Round		
2007–08	Cornwall/Devon	6th	24	EDF Energy Senior Vase	1st round	Devon Junior Cup	Winners
2008–09	Cornwall/Devon	7th	26				
2009–10	Cornwall/Devon	6th	30	RFU Senior Vase	6th Round		
2010–11	Cornwall/Devon (8)	1st (promoted)	123 (Note: The 2010–11 season would see the introduction of bonus points into lower league English rugby union (tier 6 and below).)			Devon Intermediate Cup	Winners
2011–12	Western Counties West (7)	3rd	91			Devon Intermediate Cup	Winners
2012–13	Western Counties West (7)	2nd (promoted via playoff)	96				
2013–14	South West 1 West (6)	8th	59				
2014–15	South West 1 West (6)	4th	76			Devon Senior Cup	1st round
2015–16	South West 1 West (6)	5th	73			Devon Senior Cup	Semi-finals
2016–17	South West 1 West (6)	11th	48			Devon Senior Cup	Semi-finals
2017–18	South West 1 West (6)	13th (relegated)	43			Devon Senior Cup	1st round
2018–19	Western Counties West (7)	10th	49			Devon Senior Shield	6th
2019–20	Western Counties West (7)	8th	62.64 (Note: The season was postponed and ultimately cancelled due to the COVID-19 pandemic in the United Kingdom with Bideford sitting in 8th, having played 21 games and gained 52 points. The remaining games were calculated on a 'best playing record formula', with Bideford remaining in 6th place with 62.64 points.)			Devon Senior Shield	
2020–21	Western Counties West (7)						
Green background stands for either league champions (with promotion) or cup winners. Blue background stands for promotion without winning league or losing cup finalists. Pink background stands for relegation.

== Honours ==
- Devon Junior Cup winners (3): 1933, 1935, 2008
- Havill Plate winners: 1975
- Tribute Cornwall/Devon champions (3):1991–92, 2000-01,2010–11
- Cornwall 1 v Devon 1 promotion play-off winners: 2006–07
- Devon Intermediate Cup winners (2): 2011, 2012
- Tribute Western Counties (North v West) promotion play-off winners: 2012–13
- U15’s Devon 7’s winners: 2024

== See also ==
- Devon RFU
