= Tredegar (disambiguation) =

Tredegar is a town and community situated on the banks of the Sirhowy River in the county borough of Blaenau Gwent, in the southeast of Wales.

Tredegar can also refer to:

== Places ==
- Tredegar General Hospital
- Recreation Ground, Tredegar
- New Tredegar, a former mining town in Wales
- Tredegar House, a stately home in Newport, Wales
  - Stable Block, Tredegar House
- Tredegar House Country Park, a park containing Tredegar House
- Tredegar Park, Newport
- Tredegarville, an area of Cardiff, Wales
- Tredegar Square, a Georgian square in Mile End, London

== Commerce ==
- Merthyr, Tredegar and Abergavenny Railway
- Tredegar Corporation, a manufacturer of plastic films
- Tredegar Iron Works, an iron works in Richmond, Virginia, USA
  - Lord Tredegar, Bow, a public house in London

== Music ==
- Tredegar Town Band
- Tredegar (band), a Welsh heavy metal band
  - Tredegar (album)

== Sport ==
- Tredegar Town F.C., a football club
- Tredegar RFC, a rugby club
- Tredegar Ironsides RFC
  - New Tredegar RFC

== People ==
- Baron Tredegar, a title in the Peerage of the United Kingdom
