= Coborn =

Coborn may refer to:

- Charles Coborn (1852–1945), British music hall singer and comedian born in Stepney, east London
- Coborn Road railway station, station built by the Great Eastern Railway on the main line out of London from Liverpool Street
- Coopers' Company and Coborn School, 11-18 school in Upminster, in the London Borough of Havering
- Prisca Coborn (1622–1701), wealthy widow (her husband was a brewer) who established Coopers' Company and Coborn School in Bow in 1701

== See also ==
- Coburn (disambiguation)
- Osborn (disambiguation)
