= Coopers' Company and Coborn School =

The Coopers' Company and Coborn School
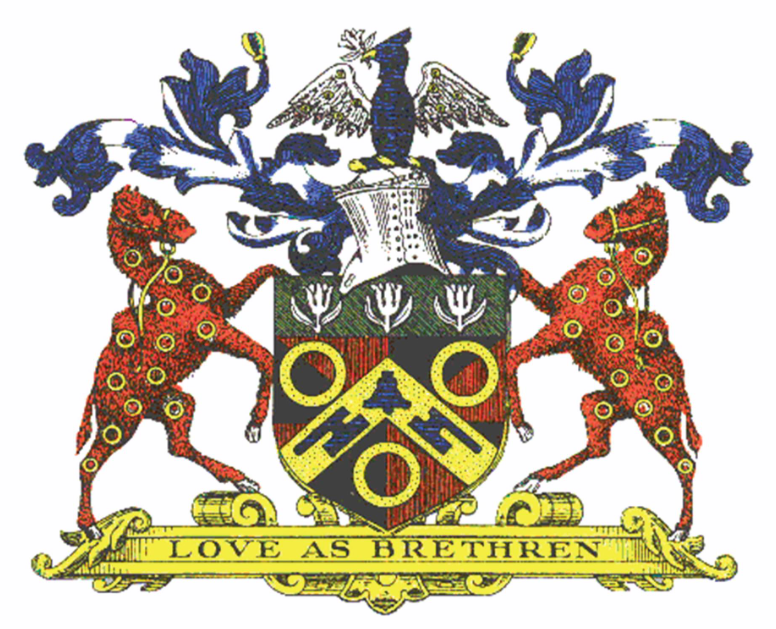

Location
- St Mary's Lane; Upminster, Greater London, RM14 3HS; England; 51.5562°N 0.2596°E

Information
- Type: Academy
- Motto: Love As Brethren
- Religious affiliation: Christian
- Established: 1536; 490 years ago
- Founder: Nicholas Gibson (1536), Prisca Coborn (1701). United in 1891, moved in 1971-1973
- Department for Education URN: 136600 Tables
- Ofsted: Reports
- Head teacher: Sue Hay
- Staff: Approx 94 teaching staff
- Gender: Co-educational
- Age: 11 to 18
- Enrolment: 1300-1400
- Houses: Coborn, Guild, Gibson, Ratcliffe
- Colours: Red, Blue, Green, Yellow
- Former pupils: Old boys/Old girls
- Website: http://www.cooperscoborn.org.uk

The Coopers' Company and Coborn School is a secondary school and sixth form with academy status, located in Upminster area of the London Borough of Havering, England.

== Admissions ==
The school is (since 2005) a non-selective school described by Ofsted as "an exceptional school of real excellence". The school excels at Performing Arts and Sports. In 2004 as part of the European Year of Education through Sport it won the award of "Europe's most sport minded school".

There have been no tests since 2001 nor interviews since 2004 for admission. Current applications are made via application form completed by the prospective students' parents and, months later, by a second form completed by the students themselves. This is not an examination but is heavily scrutinized. The school is heavily oversubscribed with approximately 5 applicants for each of the 180 places (over 900 applicants per year group). Due to this issue, Coopers' and Coborn School has appeared on an episode of Panorama, filmed by the BBC, to address this issue.

It is situated on St Mary's Lane (B187) about half a mile east of Upminster station, just over a mile west of the M25, and two miles from junction 29 (A127).

== General information ==
The school is divided into 5 years, similar to other secondary schools in England. It is one of only a few schools in the London Borough of Havering to also have a sixth form. A new sixth form building opened in 2011. The sixth form is primarily supplied with students from the years below who have completed year 11. However, it does allow external candidates from primarily local schools to apply, with a growing proportion being accepted due to a year-on-year increase in intake in sixth form students since the 2016/2017 academic year. The school specialises in humanities and sports (geography, history, RE and PE). It has had many sporting and other successes, including national championships in hockey and winning Havering Young Chef of the year.

== History ==
The Nicholas Gibson Free School was founded in 1536 by Nicholas Gibson, a prominent citizen of the City of London who earned his living as a grocer. On his death in 1549 Gibson's wife, Avice, took over the running of the school, which could take up to sixty boys. In 1552 she asked the Coopers' Company to undertake the management of the school for her, and thus the school included the company's title in its name. The school was situated in Ratcliff, on the north side of the River Thames between Shadwell and Limehouse which is now a district of the London Borough of Tower Hamlets. Schoolhouse Lane is still there and marks the place where the School and the Coopers' Company's Almshouses were located for over three hundred years.

Prisca Coborn (née Forster), the widow of a brewer (Thomas Coborn/Colbourne), established a coeducational school in Bow in 1701 as a result of the terms of her will, registered in the year of her death (1701), investing the school with lands let to tenants in Bow, Stratford and Bocking. She is buried in Bow Church.

The Coborn school was first housed in a site east of Bow Church, quickly moving toward Bow Bridge. In 1814 the school moved to a site which later became part of the Bryant and May match factory. In 1873 a new scheme was prepared under the Endowed Schools Act to reorganise the school to give secondary education to 200 boys and 200 girls and receive more public funding. The main new site, soon extended, assumed the temporary name of Stepney Grammar School, off Tredegar Square in the west of Bow (its closest station was Coborn Road railway station and from 1902, Mile End tube station and general district was Mile End Road). The Coborn name most frequently (as shared officially) referred to the girls school at 86 Bow Road which closed in 1886 until amalgamation with the Coopers' foundation (see below). The Coopers' Boys' School in the transitional period took over the Tredegar Square building. Miss Jessie Winifred Holland, headmistress 1903–10, married Sir William Foster, historian of the Coopers' Company and its schools; she too wrote a history, but of Coborn School.

In 1891 the two foundations were united. Coopers' Girls' School at 86 Bow Road was renamed Coborn School, moving to new buildings at 29-31/31-33 Bow Road in 1898 where it remained until the move to Upminster. M. G. Philpot, headmistress 1929–56, was awarded a C.B.E. for her services to education.

=== Second World War ===
The Coopers' Company boys' school was evacuated to Frome County School (now Frome Community College) in Frome in north Somerset, in October 1939. The Coburn School for Girls was evacuated to Taunton.

=== Post war ===
On moving to Upminster the schools were amalgamated to form the then voluntary aided school. The new site was first occupied in Upminster in 1971, and by 1973 the whole school had moved into these new premises. In the 1990s Coopers'-Coborn became a selective Grant-maintained school.

The badge/arms commonly associated with the Coborn School are the arms of the Forster family (her paternal line) as the Coborn family did not have their own.

The school converted to academy status on 1 April 2011.

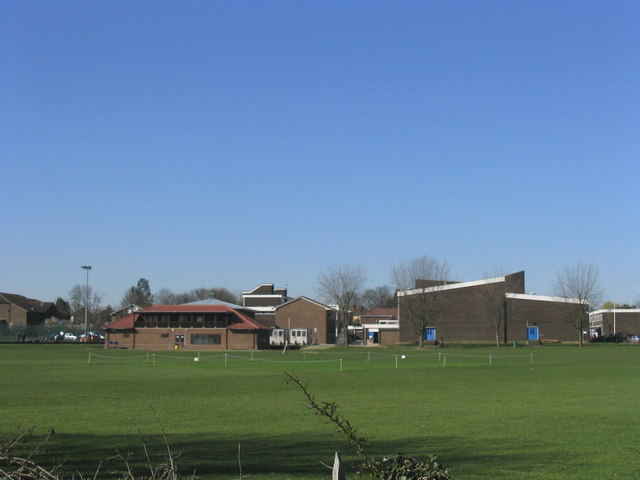
View from St Mary's Lane

== Notable former pupils ==
=== The Coopers' Company and Coborn School ===
- Riaz Amin, martial artist
- Sheila Atim, actress, singer, composer, and playwright
- Rylan Clark, media personality
- Harry Collett, actor
- Johnny Fisher, lightweight boxer
- Zara McDermott, Love Island contestant
- Nathan Michelow, rugby union player for England team
- Luke Norris, actor and playwright
- Ruby Mace, footballer Arsenal Women, Manchester City Women and Leicester City Women
- Stephen Peters, cricketer, Essex, Worcestershire and Northamptonshire
- Lorne Spicer, journalist and TV presenter
- Michael Spicer, comedian and scriptwriter
- Jenny Watson, chairwoman of the Electoral Commission since 2009, and from 2005 to 2007 of the Equal Opportunities Commission
- Rochelle Wiseman, singer, S Club 8 and The Saturdays
- Whigfield (Sannie Charlotte Carlson), singer (school exchange student for one term)

=== Coborn High School for Girls ===
- Dora, Baroness Gaitskell, wife of Hugh Gaitskell, leader of the Labour Party 1955-1963
- Cheryl Hall, actress and councillor

=== Coopers' Company's School ===
  - William Sydney Atkins, founder of WS Atkins, one of Britain's largest civil engineering companies
  - Bernard Bresslaw, actor. Appeared in a number of comedies, including some of the Carry On film series.
  - David Brewerton, journalist and former city editor of The Independent
  - Ivor Broadis, England 1954 FIFA World Cup footballer
  - Tim Holt, director from 1996 to 2000 of the Office for National Statistics and Registrar General for England and Wales, president from 2005 to 2007 of the Royal Statistical Society, and Leverhulme Professor of Social Statatistics from 1980 to 2005 at the University of Southampton
  - Richard Madeley, television presenter and author
  - Ronald Richardson, electrical engineer and chairman from 1969 to 1970 of the National Inspection Council for Electrical Installation Contracting, and of the North Western Electricity Board from 1964 to 1971 Fred Rumsey, Somerset and England cricketer and founder of the Professional Cricketers Association (PCA)
  - Arnold Shaw, Labour MP for Ilford South from 1966 to 1970 and 1974-9
  - Jack Warner, actor, Dixon of Dock Green (1955–76)
  - Jack Watling, actor
  - Christopher Wicking, screenwriter
  - R. D. Wingfield, radio dramatist
