= Tredegar Square =

Square in Mile End, London, England

Coordinates: 51°31′37″N 0°1′53″W

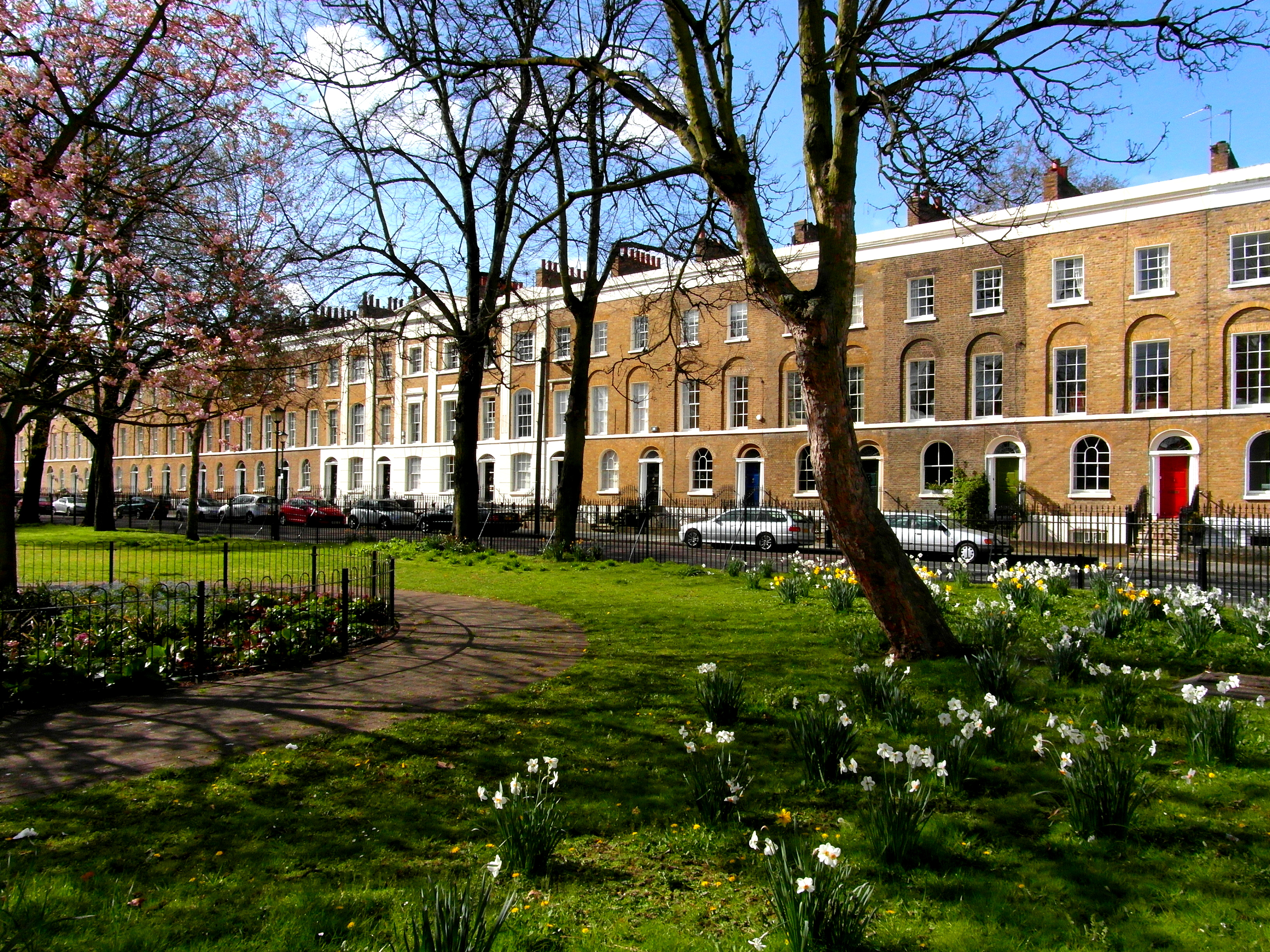
Tredegar Square - looking southwest within central garden, with houses of the west terrace beyond. The west, south and east terraces share this design, including white frame fronts of the four central houses.

Tredegar Square pronounced /trɪˈdiːɡər/ is a well-preserved Georgian square in Mile End, within the London Borough of Tower Hamlets. The square has a garden in the centre with lawns and large trees. Tredegar Square is legally protected by the Fields in Trust charity as part of the King George's Fields programme, ensuring it will remain as a green space in perpetuity.

== Location ==
Tredegar Square is 90 metres north of the main commercial thoroughfare of the district, Mile End Road. Six roads branch off the square including one sharing its name, Tredegar Square; the eponymous roadway forms an intersection with Mile End Road, about 120 metres east of Mile End tube station.

== Architecture ==
In pale brown brick, three nearly identical unbroken terraces line the west, south and east sides of the square, with long continuous white cornices, sash windows, fanlights, railings in front of basements and bold, traditional single-colour doors. All windows are white framed and a stucco white frame fronts the four central houses of each of these three rows, with a white gable façade feature centered above the middle two houses (see image). The north terrace is a different design, with its own similar shaped houses or sets of subdivided houses; these have white, ashlar-faced fronts or genuine large carved stone block facings, black railings on white-painted concrete and heavily porticoed, projecting and recessed features — for example, pediments above a feature window in the few recesses. The level of complex forms and white stone-like appearance of the north terrace resembles many of the blocks in Belgravia and Bayswater.

== History ==
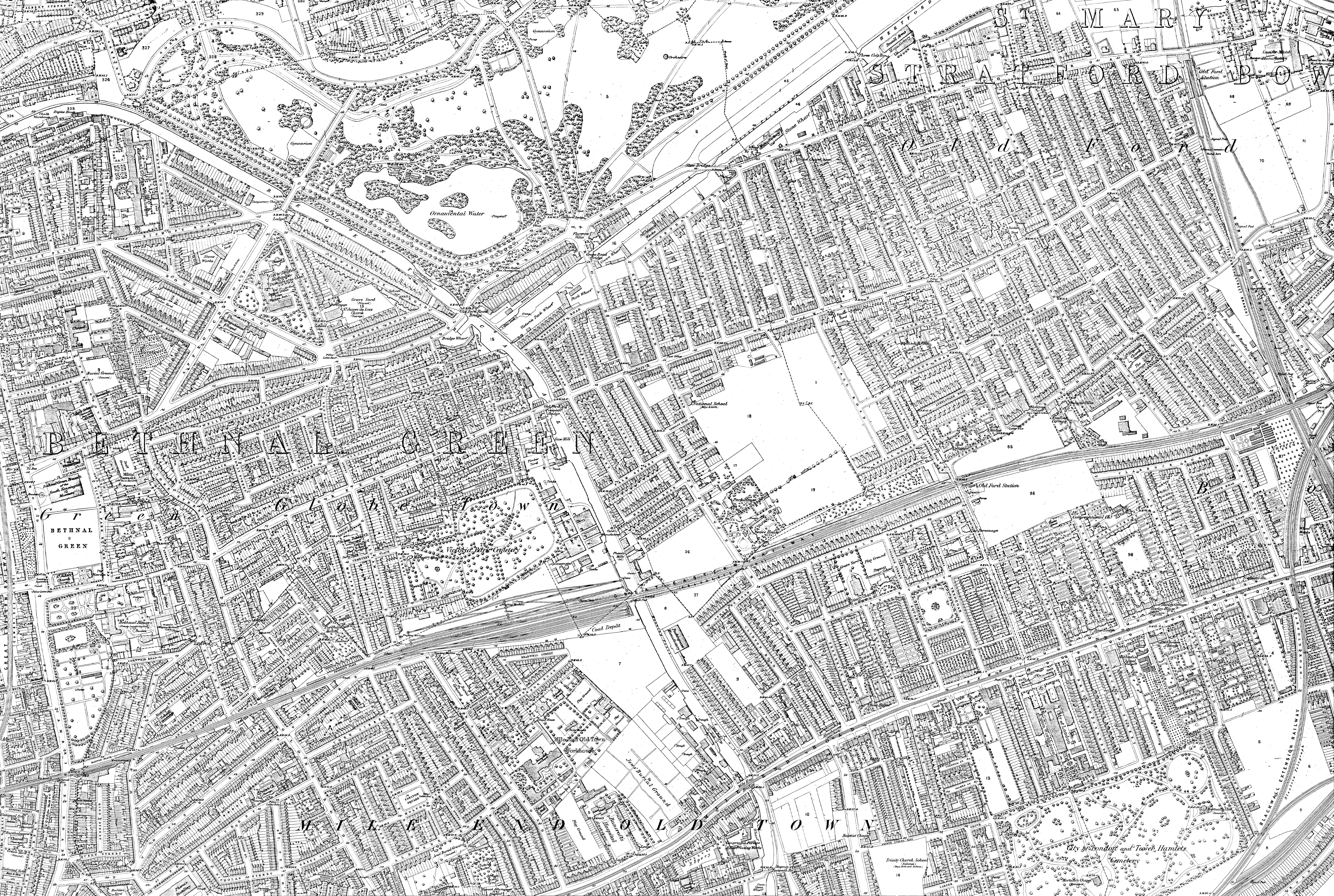
Extract from Ordnance Survey Map 1st Series 1889, scale 1:2500

The south and west sides of the square were completed in the 1830s, and the rest by 1847.

The square takes its name from the landowner, Sir Charles Morgan, 2nd Baronet, and his family estate Tredegar House near Newport, South Wales. One block north of the square is the Lord Tredegar pub and one block east The Morgan Arms, on Morgan Street.

The industrial town of Tredegar in South Wales was also named after the Tredegar estate, following the establishment nearby of The Tredegar Iron Company in 1800, on land owned by the Morgan family.

=== Coborn School campus named after square ===
Prisca Coborn (1622–1701), the widow of a Bow brewer, left property in Bow, Stratford, and Bocking (Essex) to maintain a school for not more than 50 poor children at Bow; the boys were to learn reading, writing, and accounts, and the girls reading, writing, and needlework. An expansion plan in 1873, to day-school 200 boys and 200 girls (in adjoining buildings) meant the Bocking estate was sold and part of the proceeds used to purchase and extend a building "in Tredegar Square", however clearly shown on the map as narrowly beyond its north-west corner, also known as Stepney Grammar School. The school did not prosper on its own in its new surroundings, and by 1884 was in financial difficulties; the girls' school temporarily closed and a merger took place within a decade. In 1898 Coborn School was moved to 29–31 Bow Road, where it remained until the move to Upminster in 1971, initial plans of which had been well advanced in 1963.

=== Restoration after damage in the London Blitz ===
The Tredegar Square Conservation Area was established in 1971. The square had become neglected prior to World War II, made worse when the area surrounding the square was badly damaged by bombing during the war.
