= Regional 2 South West =

English rugby union league

- Current season or competition: 2026–27 Regional 2 South West
- Sport: Rugby union
- Instituted: 1987; 39 years ago (as South West 2)
- Number of teams: 12
- Country: England
- Holders: Weston-super-Mare RFC (2nd title) (2025–26 (promoted to Regional 1 South West))
- Most titles: Cinderford, Hornets, Matson, Old Patesians, Truro and Weston-super-Mare (2 titles)
- Website: Regional 2 South West

Regional 2 South West, (formerly known as South West 1 West) is an English, level six, rugby union league for clubs based in the south-west of England; i.e. Cornwall, Devon, Dorset and Somerset. It is one of twelve leagues at this level in England. When league rugby started in 1986 it was known as South West 2, but in 1996 the division was split into two leagues — South West 1 West and South West 1 East. South West 1 West was renamed Regional 2 South West prior to the 2022–23 season. The champions are promoted to Regional 1 South West (formerly South West Premier) and the bottom two sides are relegated, depending on location, to either Counties 1 Western West, Counties 1 Western North or Counties 1 Southern South.

Weston-super-Mare are the current champions.

== Format ==
The season runs from September to April and comprises twenty-two rounds of matches, with each club playing each of its rivals, home and away. The results of the matches contribute points to the league as follows:

- 4 points are awarded for a win
- 2 points are awarded for a draw
- 0 points are awarded for a loss, however
- 1 losing (bonus) point is awarded to a team that loses a match by 7 points or fewer
- 1 additional (bonus) point is awarded to a team scoring 4 tries or more in a match.

== 2026–27 ==
=== Participating teams and location ===
Nine of last years teams participated in this season's competition; five of the teams are from Devon, while Somerset and Cornwall have four clubs and two clubs respectively and Dorset has one club. Departing were Weston-super-Mare promoted to Regional 1 South West while Cullompton (11th) and Wellington (12th) were relegated to Counties 1 Western West and Counties 1 Western North respectively. There were three teams promoted into the league. Nailsea & Backwell champions of Counties 1 Western North, Sherborne champions of Counties 1 Southern South and Wiveliscombe champions of Counties 1 Western West.

Team	Ground	Capacity	Town/Area	Previous season
Crediton	Blagdon		Crediton, Devon	5th
Ivybridge	Cross-in-Hand		Ivybridge, Devon	6th
Nailsea & Backwell	West End Park		Nailsea, Somerset	Promoted from Counties 1 Western North (1st)
North Petherton	Beggars Brook		North Petherton, Somerset	9th
Okehampton	Showground	1,120 (120 seats)	Okehampton, Devon	4th
Pirates Amateurs	Mennaye Field	4,000 (2,200 seats)	Penzance, Cornwall	8th
Sherborne	Gainsborough Park		Sherborne, Dorset	Promoted from Counties 1 Southern South (1st)
Teignmouth	Bitton Park Sports Ground	1,210 (210 stand)	Teignmouth, Devon	10th
Tiverton	Coronation Field	750 (250 seated)	Tiverton, Devon	2nd
Wadebridge Camels	Molesworth Field	500	Wadebridge, Cornwall	3rd
Winscombe	Recreation Ground	1,200	Winscombe, Somerset	7th
Wiveliscombe	Recreational Ground		Wiveliscombe, Somerset	Promoted from Counties 1 Western West (1st)

Locations of the 2026–27 Regional 2 South West teams

== 2025–26 ==
=== Participating teams and location ===
Nine of last years teams participated in this season's competition; six of the teams are from Devon, while Somerset and Cornwall have four clubs and two clubs respectively. Departing were Topsham promoted to Regional 1 South West while Truro and Newton Abbot were relegated to Counties 1 Western West. Incoming teams were Ivybridge relegated from Regional 1 South West, Pirates Amateurs promoted from Counties 1 Western West and Weston-super-Mare on a level transfer from Regional 2 Severn.

Team	Ground	Capacity	Town/Area	Previous season
Crediton	Blagdon		Crediton, Devon	2nd
Cullompton	Stafford Park		Cullompton, Devon	7th
Ivybridge	Cross-in-Hand		Ivybridge, Devon	Relegated from Regional 1 SW (12th)
North Petherton	Beggars Brook		North Petherton, Somerset	8th
Okehampton	Showground	1,120 (120 seats)	Okehampton, Devon	5th
Pirates Amateurs	Mennaye Field	4,000 (2,200 seats)	Penzance, Cornwall	Promoted from Counties 1 Western West (1st)
Teignmouth	Bitton Park Sports Ground	1,210 (210 stand)	Teignmouth, Devon	10th
Tiverton	Coronation Field	750 (250 seated)	Tiverton, Devon	3rd
Wadebridge Camels	Molesworth Field	500	Wadebridge, Cornwall	4th
Wellington	Athletic Ground		Wellington, Somerset	9th
Weston-super-Mare	Recreation Ground	6,000	Weston-super-Mare, Somerset	Level transfer from Regional 2 Severn (7th)
Winscombe	Recreation Ground	1,200	Winscombe, Somerset	6th

Locations of the 2025–26 Regional 2 South West teams

=== League table ===
2025–26 Regional 2 South West table
		Played	Won	Drawn	Lost	Points for	Points against	Points diff	Try bonus	Loss bonus	Points	Adj points
1	Weston-super-Mare (P)	22	22	0	0	1030	358	672	22	0	110	
2	Tiverton	22	18	0	4	822	463	359	18	3	93	
3	Wadebridge Camels	22	14	0	8	747	524	223	16	2	74	
4	Okehampton	22	14	0	8	629	478	151	13	4	73	
5	Crediton	22	12	0	10	623	616	7	12	4	64	
6	Ivybridge	22	11	1	10	606	628	−22	13	4	64	−1
7	Winscombe	22	11	1	10	615	569	46	14	3	63	
8	Pirates Amateurs	22	10	0	12	644	561	83	13	4	58	+1
9	North Petherton	22	8	0	14	540	638	−98	11	3	46	
10	Teignmouth	22	7	0	15	493	785	−292	8	2	38	
11	Cullompton (R)	22	4	0	18	439	785	−346	6	3	25	
12	Wellington (R)	22	0	0	22	219	1002	−783	2	1	−2	−5
Points are awarded as follows: four points for a win; two points for a draw; no points for a loss; one bonus point for scoring four tries or more in a match; one bonus point for losing by seven points or less.; If teams are level at any stage, tiebreakers are applied in the following order: 1. Number of matches won 2. Difference between points for and against 3. Total number of points for 4. Aggregate number of points scored in matches between tied teams
Mint background is the promotion place. (1st); Green background are the promotion play-off places. (2nd–5th); Pink background are the relegation play-off places (10th–11th); Salmon background is the relegation place. (12th); Updated: 25 April 2026

=== Play-offs ===
Promotion play-offs

This seasons play-offs, for the second promotion place to Regional 1 South West, is between the teams placed 2nd to 5th; followed by a play-off against the Regional 2 Severn play-off winner. In each match the highest placed team play at home.

Regional 2 promotion play-offs

18 April 2026

Tiverton (2nd)	48 – 14	Crediton (5th)

Coronation Field, Tiverton

18 April 2026

Wadebridge Camels (3rd)	54 – 24	Okehampton (4th)

Molesworth Field. Wadebridge

25 April 2026

Tiverton (2nd)	42 – 38	Wadebridge Camels (3rd)

Coronation Field, Tiverton

Regional 2 Severn v Regional 2 South West play-off

2 May 2026

Chippenham	25 – 17	Tiverton (2nd)

Allington Fields, Chippenham

Relegation play-off

25 April 2026

Teignmouth (10th)	36 – 34	Cullumpton (11th)

Bitton Park Sports Ground

- Cullumpton relegated

== 2024–25 ==
=== Participating teams and location ===
Seven of the teams are from Devon, while Somerset has three clubs and Cornwall two clubs. Nine of last years teams participated in this season's competition, Sidmouth were promoted to Regional 1 South West while Chard and Burham-on-Sea were relegated to Counties 1 Western North. The new teams were Okehampton relegated from Regional 1 South West, Tiverton promoted from Counties 1 Western West and Winscombe on a level transfer from Regional 2 Severn.

Team	Ground	Capacity	Town/Area	Previous season
Crediton	Blagdon		Crediton, Devon	4th
Cullompton	Stafford Park		Cullompton, Devon	5th
Newton Abbot	Rackerhayes	1,150 (150 stand)	Newton Abbot, Devon	10th
North Petherton	Beggars Brook		North Petherton, Somerset	7th
Okehampton	Showground	1,120 (120 seats)	Okehampton, Devon	Relegated from Regional 1 SW (11th)
Teignmouth	Bitton Park Sports Ground	1,210 (210 stand)	Teignmouth, Devon	8th
Tiverton	Coronation Field	750 (250 seated)	Tiverton, Devon	Promoted from Counties 1 Western West (1st)
Topsham	Bonfire Field		Topsham, Exeter	3rd
Truro	St Clement's Hill	2,000	Truro, Cornwall	6th
Wadebridge Camels	Molesworth Field	500	Wadebridge, Cornwall	2nd
Wellington	Athletic Ground		Wellington, Somerset	9th
Winscombe	Recreation Ground	1,200	Winscombe, Somerset	Level transfer from Regional 2 Severn (8th)

Locations of the 2024–25 Regional 2 South West teams

=== League table ===
2024–25 Regional 2 South West League Table
		Played	Won	Drawn	Lost	Points for	Points against	Points diff	Try bonus	Loss bonus	Points
1	Topsham (P)	22	21	0	1	1155	455	700	21	1	106
2	Crediton	22	17	0	5	729	411	318	15	4	87
3	Tiverton	22	16	0	6	745	374	371	13	3	80
4	Wadebridge Camels	22	15	1	6	743	494	249	15	2	79
5	Okehampton	22	15	0	7	646	476	170	15	1	76
6	Winscombe	22	11	0	11	586	606	−20	11	4	59
7	Cullompton	22	8	0	14	545	637	−92	9	5	46
8	North Petherton	22	7	1	14	583	748	−165	7	4	41
9	Wellington	22	7	0	15	448	727	−279	9	3	40
10	Teignmouth	22	5	0	17	440	755	−315	8	4	32
11	Truro (R)	22	5	0	17	402	918	−516	6	1	27
12	Newton Abbot (R)	22	3	2	17	425	846	−421	8	3	27
Points are awarded as follows: four points for a win; two points for a draw; no points for a loss; one bonus point for scoring four tries or more in a match; one bonus point for losing by seven points or less.; If teams are level at any stage, tiebreakers are applied in the following order: 1. Number of matches won 2. Difference between points for and against 3. Total number of points for 4. Aggregate number of points scored in matches between tied teams
Green background is the promotion place. Pink background are the relegation places. Updated: 10 April 2025

== 2023–24 ==
Nine of last seasons twelve teams played in that season's competition. The champions St Austell were promoted to Regional 1 South West, while Sherborne (11th) and Bridgwater & Albion (12th) were relegated to Counties 1 Southern South and Counties 1 Western North respectively. Promoted from Counties 1 Western West are Topsham and Cullompton. Burnham-on-Sea are also promoted as the runner-up from Counties 1 Western North. (Chippenham II, as champions, are not eligible for promotion because their first XV play in Regional 2 Severn also a level six league).

=== Participating teams and location ===
Team	Ground	Capacity	Town/Area	Previous season
Burnham-on-Sea	BASC Ground		Burnham-on-Sea, Somerset	Promoted from Counties 1 Western North (2nd)
Chard	The Park, Essex Close		Chard, Somerset	9th
Crediton	Blagdon		Crediton, Devon	2nd
Cullompton	Stafford Park		Cullompton, Devon	Promoted from Counties 1 Western West (2nd)
Newton Abbot	Rackerhayes	1,150 (150 stand)	Newton Abbot, Devon	10th
North Petherton	Beggars Brook		North Petherton, Somerset	8th
Sidmouth	Blackmore Field		Sidmouth, Devon	7th
Teignmouth	Bitton Park Sports Ground	1,210 (210 stand)	Teignmouth, Devon	6th
Topsham	Bonfire Field		Topsham, Exeter	Promoted from Counties 1 Western West (1st)
Truro	St Clement's Hill	2,000	Truro, Cornwall	3rd
Wadebridge Camels	Molesworth Field	500	Wadebridge, Cornwall	4th
Wellington	Athletic Ground		Wellington, Somerset	5th

Locations of the 2023–24 Regional 2 South West teams

=== League table ===
2023–24 Regional 2 South West League Table
		Played	Won	Drawn	Lost	Points for	Points against	Points diff	Try bonus	Loss bonus	Points
1	Sidmouth (P)	22	21	0	1	826	371	455	17	0	101
2	Wadebridge Camels	22	17	0	5	832	404	428	16	3	87
3	Topsham	22	16	0	6	960	581	379	19	3	86
4	Crediton	22	17	0	5	774	524	250	15	2	85
5	Cullompton	22	12	0	10	618	539	79	13	5	66
6	Truro	22	11	0	11	569	601	−32	13	7	64
7	North Petherton	22	10	0	12	524	705	−181	8	3	51
8	Teignmouth	22	9	0	13	534	616	−82	9	6	51
9	Wellington	22	8	0	14	498	627	−129	11	4	47
10	Newton Abbot	22	4	0	18	516	970	−454	9	5	30
11	Chard (R)	22	4	0	18	425	671	−246	4	5	25
12	Burnham-on-Sea (R)	22	3	0	19	384	851	−467	6	6	24
Points are awarded as follows: four points for a win; two points for a draw; no points for a loss; one bonus point for scoring four tries or more in a match; one bonus point for losing by seven points or less.; If teams are level at any stage, tiebreakers are applied in the following order: 1. Number of matches won 2. Difference between points for and against 3. Total number of points for 4. Aggregate number of points scored in matches between tied teams
Green background is the promotion place. Pink background are the relegation places. Updated: 21 July 2024

== 2022–23 ==
=== Participating teams and location ===
Team	Ground	Capacity	Town/Area	Previous season
Bridgwater & Albion	Bath Road	5,000 (600 seats)	Bridgwater, Somerset	10th
Chard	The Park, Essex Close		Chard, Somerset	Promoted from Western Counties West (5th)
Crediton	Blagdon		Crediton, Devon	9th
Newton Abbot	Rackerhayes	1,150 (150 stand)	Newton Abbot, Devon	Promoted from Western Counties West (3rd)
North Petherton	Beggars Brook		North Petherton, Somerset	11th
Sherborne	Gainsborough Park		Sherborne, Dorset	Transferred from South West 1 East 10th
Sidmouth	Blackmore Field		Sidmouth, Devon	8th
St Austell	Tregorrick Park	4,000 (300 seats)	St Austell, Cornwall	4th
Teignmouth	Bitton Park Sports Ground	1,210 (210 stand)	Teignmouth, Devon	Promoted from Western Counties West (4th)
Truro	St Clement's Hill	2,000	Truro, Cornwall	Promoted from Western Counties West (2nd)
Wadebridge Camels	Molesworth Field	500	Wadebridge, Cornwall	Promoted from Western Counties West (1st)
Wellington	Athletic Ground		Wellington, Somerset	12th

Locations of the 2022–23 Regional 2 South West teams

=== League table ===
2022–23 Regional 2 South West League Table
		Played	Won	Drawn	Lost	Points for	Points against	Points diff	Try bonus	Loss bonus	Points
1	St Austell (P)	22	20	0	2	1043	252	791	19	1	100
2	Crediton	22	19	0	3	725	369	356	16	1	93
3	Truro	22	15	0	7	563	467	96	11	4	75
4	Wadebridge Camels	22	14	1	7	632	369	263	11	3	72
5	Wellington	22	12	0	10	564	581	−17	11	4	63
6	Teignmouth	22	11	0	11	589	644	−55	11	4	59
7	Sidmouth	22	10	1	11	591	495	96	9	4	55
8	North Petherton	22	7	0	15	425	780	−355	9	4	41
9	Chard	22	7	1	14	328	491	−163	4	4	38
10	Newton Abbot	22	5	1	16	485	668	−183	11	4	37
11	Sherborne	22	7	0	15	318	613	−295	4	1	33
12	Bridgwater & Albion (R)	22	3	0	19	312	846	−534	3	1	16
Points are awarded as follows: four points for a win; two points for a draw; no points for a loss; one bonus point for scoring four tries or more in a match; one bonus point for losing by seven points or less.; If teams are level at any stage, tiebreakers are applied in the following order: 1. Number of matches won 2. Difference between points for and against 3. Total number of points for 4. Aggregate number of points scored in matches between tied teams
Green background is the promotion place. Pink background is the relegation place. Updated: 24 March 2023

== 2021–22 ==
=== Participating teams and location ===
Ahead of the new season, Stroud RFC (promoted as Western Counties North champions in 2019–20) withdrew from the league, leaving thirteen teams in this season's competition. Ten of the teams in this season's competition competed in 2019–20. The 'previous season' column in the table below refers to 2019–20 not 2020–21, which was cancelled due to the Covid-19 pandemic. Of the thirteen teams competing in this season's competition, five are from Somerset, four from Gloucester, three from Devon and one from Cornwall. The season started on 4 September 2021 and the final matches were played on 23 April 2022.

Chew Valley won the competition for the first time, just one point ahead of both Devonport Services and Lydney, in 2nd and 3rd place respectively. Owing to the reorganisation of the league system for next season, an announcement is awaited from the RFU as to which league teams will be allocated to.

Team	Ground	Capacity	Town/Area	Previous season
Bridgwater & Albion	Bath Road	5,000 (600 seats)	Bridgwater, Somerset	7th
Chew Valley	Chew Lane		Chew Magna, Somerset	6th
Crediton	Blagdon		Crediton, Devon	10th
Devonport Services	The Rectory	2,000	Devonport, Plymouth, Devon	4th
Keynsham	Bristol Road		Keynsham, Somerset	9th
Lydney	Regentsholm	3,000 (340 seats)	Lydney, Gloucestershire	2nd
Newent	Recreation Ground		Newent, Gloucestershire	11th
North Petherton	Beggars Brook		North Petherton, Somerset	8th
Old Patesians	Everest Road		Cheltenham, Gloucestershire	Transferred from South West 1 East (9th)
Sidmouth	Blackmore Field		Sidmouth, Devon	5th
St Austell	Tregorrick Park	4,000 (300 seats)	St Austell, Cornwall	Promoted from Western Counties West (runner-up)
Thornbury	Cooper's Farm		Thornbury, Gloucestershire	3rd
Wellington	Athletic Ground		Wellington, Somerset	Promoted from Western Counties West (champions)

Locations of the 2021–22 South West 1 West South teams

=== League table ===
2021–22 South West 1 West League Table
		Played	Won	Drawn	Lost	Points for	Points against	Points diff	Try bonus	Loss bonus	Points	Points adjusted
1	Chew Valley (P)	24	19	0	5	803	404	399	14	2	92	
2	Devonport Services	24	19	1	4	786	385	401	12	1	91	
3	Lydney	24	18	1	5	643	350	293	13	3	91	
4	St Austell	24	16	0	8	670	364	306	15	5	85	
5	Thornbury	24	15	1	8	641	496	145	13	3	78	
6	Keynsham	24	14	0	10	516	430	86	8	5	69	
7	Newent	24	12	0	12	579	556	23	9	4	61	
8	Sidmouth	24	9	2	13	467	521	−54	5	5	50	
9	Crediton	24	10	0	14	412	538	−126	5	6	47	−5
10	Bridgwater & Albion	24	7	1	16	399	757	−358	3	4	37	
11	North Petherin	24	5	0	19	466	824	−358	6	9	35	
12	Wellington	24	6	1	17	417	666	−249	5	3	30	−5
13	Old Patesians	24	2	1	21	341	849	−508	5	5	20	
Points are awarded as follows: four points for a win; two points for a draw; no points for a loss; one bonus point for scoring four tries or more in a match; one bonus point for losing by seven points or less.; If teams are level at any stage, tiebreakers are applied in the following order: 1. Number of matches won 2. Difference between points for and against 3. Total number of points for 4. Aggregate number of points scored in matches between tied teams
Green background are the promotion places. Updated: 29 July 2022

== 2020–21 ==
Due to the COVID-19 pandemic the season was cancelled.

== 2019–20 ==
=== Participating teams and location ===
Team	Ground	Capacity	Town/Area	Previous season
Bridgwater & Albion	Bath Road	5,000 (600 seats)	Bridgwater, Somerset	4th
Chew Valley	Chew Lane		Chew Magna, Somerset	Promoted from Western Counties North (champions)
Cleve	The Hayfields		Mangotsfield, Gloucestershire	Relegated from South West Premier (12th)
Crediton	Blagdon		Crediton, Devon	Promoted from Western Counties West (play-off)
Devonport Services	The Rectory	2,000	Devonport, Plymouth, Devon	8th
Hornets	Hutton Moor Park	1,100 (100 stand)	Weston-super-Mare, Somerset	10th
Keynsham	Bristol Road		Keynsham, Somerset	9th
Lydney	Regentsholm	3,000 (340 seats)	Lydney, Gloucestershire	7th
Newent	Recreation Ground		Newent, Gloucestershire	3rd
Newton Abbot	Rackerhayes	1,150 (150 stand)	Newton Abbot, Devon	Relegated from South West Premier (13th)
North Petherton	Beggars Brook		North Petherton, Somerset	5th
Sidmouth	Blackmore Field		Sidmouth, Devon	Promoted from Western Counties West (champions)
St Ives (Note: St Ives withdrew from the league and their fixtures were explunged, following a heavy defeat in their opening match at Chew Valley.)	Recreation Ground	3,000 (275 seats)	St Ives, Cornwall	6th
Thornbury	Cooper's Farm		Thornbury, Gloucestershire	11th

Locations of the 2019–20 South West 1 West South teams

=== League table ===
2019–20 South West 1 West League Table (to 16 March 2020, when play stopped due to COVID-19) / Final Positions
		Played	Won	Drawn	Lost	Points for	Points against	Points diff	Try bonus	Loss bonus	Points	Final position	Team	Points (adjusted)
1	Hornets (P)	20	15	1	4	673	333	340	10	3	75	1	Hornets	88
2	Lydney	20	14	0	6	549	351	198	10	2	68	2	Lydney	82
3	Devonport Services	19	12	2	5	500	358	142	9	4	65	3	Thornbury	82
4	Thornbury	20	12	0	8	589	367	222	12	4	64	4	Devonport Services	81
5	Sidmouth	21	12	1	8	516	412	104	8	4	62	5	Sidmouth	71
6	Chew Valley	21	11	0	10	638	538	100	13	4	61	6	Chew Valley	70
7	Bridgwater & Albion	20	11	0	9	417	452	−35	8	2	54	7	Bridgewater & Albion	65
8	Keynsham	20	11	0	9	414	384	30	3	5	52	8	North Petherton	61
9	North Petherton	20	10	0	10	429	437	−8	8	3	51	9	Keynsham	60
10	Crediton	20	7	0	13	351	654	−303	6	4	38	10	Crediton	46
11	Newent	19	6	0	13	366	515	−149	4	4	32	11	Newent	40
12	Cleve	20	5	1	14	322	594	−272	6	1	29	12	Cleve	35
13	Newton Abbot	20	1	1	18	288	657	−369	4	7	17	13	Newton Abbot	20
Points are awarded as follows: four points for a win; two points for a draw; no points for a loss; one bonus point for scoring four tries or more in a match; one bonus point for losing by seven points or less.; If teams are level at any stage, tiebreakers are applied in the following order: 1. Number of matches won 2. Difference between points for and against 3. Total number of points for 4. Aggregate number of points scored in matches between tied teams
Green background is the promotion place. Blue background is the play-off place. Pink background are relegation places. Updated: 30 January 2021

== 2018–19 ==
=== Participating teams and location ===
Team	Ground	Capacity	Town/Area	Previous season
Bridgwater & Albion	Bath Road	5,000 (600 seats)	Bridgwater, Somerset	10th
Coney Hill	Metz Hill		Gloucester, Gloucestershire	Promoted from Western Counties North (champions)
Cullompton	Stafford Park		Cullompton, Devon	9th
Devonport Services	The Rectory	2,000	Devonport, Plymouth, Devon	Promoted from Western Counties West (play-off)
Hornets	Hutton Moor Park	1,100 (100 stand)	Weston-super-Mare, Somerset	Relegated from South West Premier (13th)
Keynsham	Bristol Road		Keynsham, Somerset	11th
Launceston	Polson Bridge	3,000 (194 seats)	Launceston, Cornwall	3rd
Lydney	Regentsholm	3,000 (340 seats)	Lydney, Gloucestershire	Relegated from South West Premier (14th)
Newent	Recreation Ground		Newent, Gloucestershire	4th
North Petherton	Beggars Brook		North Petherton, Somerset	6th
Okehampton	Showground	1,120 (120 seats)	Okehampton, Devon	5th
St Ives	Recreation Ground	3,000 (275 seats)	St Ives, Cornwall	Promoted from Western Counties West (champions)
Teignmouth	Bitton Park Sports Ground	1,210 (210 stand)	Teignmouth, Devon	8th
Thornbury	Cooper's Farm		Thornbury, Gloucestershire	7th

Locations of the 2018–19 South West 1 West South teams

=== League table ===
2018–19 South West 1 West League Table
		Played	Won	Drawn	Lost	Points for	Points against	Points diff	Try bonus	Loss bonus	Points
1	Okehampton (P)	26	22	0	4	821	339	482	17	3	109
2	Launceston (P)	26	21	0	5	835	520	315	17	3	106
3	Newent	26	18	0	8	713	511	202	15	4	92
4	Bridgwater & Albion	26	17	0	9	780	581	199	15	4	87
5	North Petherton	26	17	0	9	718	651	67	15	1	84
6	St Ives	26	15	0	11	786	623	163	14	7	82
7	Lydney	26	13	0	13	653	504	149	12	7	71
8	Devonport Services	26	13	0	13	676	612	64	11	7	70
9	Keynsham	26	13	0	13	525	517	8	9	3	62
10	Hornets	26	11	0	15	770	787	−17	15	3	62
11	Thornbury	26	12	0	14	667	657	10	10	3	61
12	Teignmouth	26	7	0	19	573	785	−212	10	6	44
13	Cullompton	26	2	0	24	448	970	−522	6	5	19
14	Coney Hill	26	1	0	25	248	1156	−908	3	1	−12 (Note: Coney Hill deducted 20 points)
Points are awarded as follows: four points for a win; two points for a draw; no points for a loss; one bonus point for scoring four tries or more in a match; one bonus point for losing by seven points or less.; If teams are level at any stage, tiebreakers are applied in the following order: 1. Number of matches won 2. Difference between points for and against 3. Total number of points for 4. Aggregate number of points scored in matches between tied teams
Green background is the promotion place. Blue background is the play-off place. Pink background are relegation places. Updated: 23 January 2021

=== Promotion play-off ===
This seasons play-off for promotion to the South West Premier was between Launceston and Old Centralians. Launceston had the better playing record and hosted the match at Polson Bridge, winning 33 – 22. This was the 19th play-off match, the first for Launceston and the second for Old Centralians who won promotion 2013. It was the 13th win for the home team and south-west teams have also won the match on 13 occasions.

	Played	Won	Drawn	Lost	Points for	Points against	Points diff	Try bonus	Loss bonus	Points
Launceston	26	21	0	5	835	520	315	17	3	106
Old Centralians	26	21	0	5	809	472	337	15	2	101

27 April 2018

Launceston	33 – 22	Old Centralians

Polson Bridge, Launceston
Attendance: 1000+

== 2017–18 ==
=== Participating teams and location ===
The 2017–18 South West 1 West consists of fourteen teams; five from Devon, four each from Gloucestershire and Somerset, and one from Cornwall. Ten of the fourteen teams participated in last season's competition. The season started on 2 September 2016 and the last league matches were played on 21 April 2017. The play-off match was played a week later on 28 April 2017.

Team	Ground	Capacity	Town/Area	Previous season
Bideford	King George's Field	2,000	Bideford, Devon	11th
Bridgwater & Albion	Bath Road	5,000 (600 seats)	Bridgwater, Somerset	9th
Clevedon	Coleridge Vale Playing Fields		Clevedon, Somerset	2nd (lost play-off)
Cullompton	Stafford Park		Cullompton, Devon	Promoted from Western Counties West ( via play-off)
Drybrook	Mannings Ground		Drybrook, Gloucestershire	3rd
Exeter University	Topsham Sports Ground		Exeter, Devon	Promoted from Western Counties West (champions)
Keynsham	Bristol Road		Keynsham, Somerset	Promoted from Western Counties North (champions)
Launceston	Polson Bridge	3,000 (194 seats)	Launceston, Cornwall	Relegated from National 3 South West (12th)
Matson	Redwell Road		Matson, Gloucester, Gloucestershire	4th
Newent	Recreation Ground		Newent, Gloucestershire	5th
North Petherton	Beggars Brook		North Petherton, Somerset	7th
Okehampton	Showground	1,120 (120 seats)	Okehampton, Devon	8th
Teignmouth	Bitton Park Sports Ground	1,210 (210 stand)	Teignmouth, Devon	10th
Thornbury	Cooper's Farm		Thornbury, Gloucestershire	6th

Locations of the 2017–18 South West 1 West teams

=== League table ===
2017–18 South West 1 West League Table
		Played	Won	Drawn	Lost	Points for	Points against	Points diff	Try bonus	Loss bonus	Points
1	Drybrook (P)	26	24	0	2	899	316	583	18	2	116
2	Exeter University (P)	26	22	0	4	992	462	530	23	3	114
3	Launceston	26	18	1	7	692	443	249	10	3	88
4	Newent	26	17	1	8	628	482	146	11	2	83
5	Okehampton	26	13	0	13	615	583	32	11	5	68
6	North Petherton	26	13	0	13	615	710	−95	9	4	65
7	Thornbury	26	11	0	15	641	633	8	12	8	64
8	Teignmouth	26	12	1	13	591	687	−96	8	4	62
9	Cullompton	26	10	1	15	580	636	−56	11	5	58
10	Bridgwater & Albion	26	10	0	16	528	621	−93	9	9	58
11	Keynsham	26	11	0	15	482	660	−178	8	4	56
12	Matson	26	9	1	16	462	644	−182	8	2	43 (Note: Matson deducted 5 points)
13	Bideford	26	6	1	19	523	752	−229	8	9	43
14	Clevedon	26	3	0	23	417	1036	−619	4	5	21
Points are awarded as follows: four points for a win; two points for a draw; no points for a loss; one bonus point for scoring four tries or more in a match; one bonus point for losing by seven points or less.; If teams are level at any stage, tiebreakers are applied in the following order: 1. Number of matches won 2. Difference between points for and against 3. Total number of points for 4. Aggregate number of points scored in matches between tied teams
Green background is the promotion place. Blue background is the play-off place. Pink background are relegation places. Updated: 12 January 2021

=== Promotion play-off ===
This seasons play-off for promotion to the South West Premier was between Exeter University and Banbury. Over the season Exeter University had the better playing record and hosted the match at Topsham Sports Ground, winning 41 – 32. This was the 18th play-off match and the first for each of the teams; it was the 12th win for the home team and south-west teams have also won the match on 12 occasions. Banbury's total of 32 points was the most by a losing team and also the most by an away team.

	Played	Won	Drawn	Lost	Points for	Points against	Points diff	Try bonus	Loss bonus	Points
Exeter University (P)	26	22	0	4	992	462	530	23	3	114
Banbury	26	22	1	3	906	434	472	20	2	112

28 April 2018

Exeter University	42 – 31	Banbury

Topsham Sports Ground

== 2016–17 ==
=== Participating teams and location ===
The 2016–17 South West 1 West consists of fourteen teams; six from Somerset and four each from Devon and Gloucestershire. Ten of the fourteen teams participated in last season's competition. The season started on 3 September 2016 and the last league matches were played on 22 April 2017. The play-off match was played a week later on 29 April 2017.

Locations of the 2016–17 South West 1 West teams within Devon
Locations of the 2016–17 South West 1 West teams within Somerset
Locations of the 2016–17 South West 1 West teams within Gloucestershire

Team	Ground	Capacity	Town/Village	Previous season
Bideford	King George's Field	2,000	Bideford, Devon	5th
Bridgwater & Albion	Bath Road	5,000 (600 seats)	Bridgwater, Somerset	7th
Chard	The Park, Essex Close		Chard, Somerset	11th
Clevedon	Coleridge Vale Playing Fields		Clevedon, Somerset	8th
Drybrook	Mannings Ground		Drybrook, Gloucestershire	6th
Kingsbridge	High House	1,000 (50 seats)	Kingsbridge, Devon	promoted from Western Counties West (play-off)
Matson	Redwell Road		Matson, Gloucester	promoted from Western Counties North (champions)
Midsomer Norton	Norton Down Playing Fields		Midsomer Norton, Somerset	promoted from Southern Counties South (play-off)
Newent	Recreation Ground		Newent, Gloucestershire	3rd
North Petherton	Beggars Brook		North Petherton, Somerset	9th
Okehampton	Showground	1,120 (120 seats)	Okehampton, Devon	promoted from Western Counties West (champions)
Teignmouth	Bitton Park Sports Ground	1,210 (210 stand)	Teignmouth, Devon	10th
Thornbury	Cooper's Farm		Thornbury, Gloucestershire	2nd
Weston-super-Mare	Recreation Ground	3,000	Weston-super-Mare, Somerset	4th

=== League table ===
2016–17 South West 1 West League Table
		Played	Won	Drawn	Lost	Points for	Points against	Points diff	Try bonus	Loss bonus	Points
1	Weston-super-Mare (P)	26	25	1	0	1123	259	864	23	0	125
2	Clevedon	26	20	1	5	908	356	552	12	5	99
3	Drybrook	26	16	1	9	618	356	194	8	4	78
4	Matson	26	16	0	10	643	581	62	11	3	78
5	Newent	26	15	0	11	676	454	222	12	6	78
6	Thornbury	26	15	0	11	624	585	39	12	2	74
7	North Petherton	26	13	1	12	663	679	−16	11	4	69
8	Okehampton	25	13	1	11	547	414	133	8	7	64
9	Bridgwater & Albion	26	13	0	13	564	569	−5	8	4	64
10	Teignmouth	26	10	1	15	564	783	−219	14	2	58
11	Bideford	26	9	0	17	474	635	−161	7	5	48
12	Chard	25	6	0	19	385	751	−366	7	3	34
13	Kingsbridge	26	5	1	20	380	753	−373	4	3	29
14	Midsomer Norton	26	1	1	24	278	1204	−926	1	1	8
Points are awarded as follows: four points for a win; two points for a draw; no points for a loss; one bonus point for scoring four tries or more in a match; one bonus point for losing by seven points or less.; If teams are level at any stage, tiebreakers are applied in the following order: 1. Number of matches won 2. Difference between points for and against 3. Total number of points for 4. Aggregate number of points scored in matches between tied teams
Green background is the promotion place. Blue background is the play-off place. Pink background are relegation places. Updated: 30 April 2017

=== Promotion play-off ===
Each season, the runners-up in South West 1 East and South West 1 West, participate in a play-off for promotion to National League 3 South West. The team with the best playing record, in this case Newbury Blues, host the match and they beat their opponents Clevedon 25 – 22.

	Played	Won	Drawn	Lost	Points for	Points against	Points diff	Try bonus	Loss bonus	Points
Newbury Blues (P)	26	21	1	4	894	401	493	17	2	105
Clevedon	26	20	1	5	908	356	552	12	5	99

29 April 2017
15:00

Newbury Blues	25 – 22	Clevedon
	Newbury

Monks Lane

== 2015–16 ==
Camborne became champions on 9 April 2016, with two matches to play. Thornbury lost the play-off for promotion 24 – 26 at Salisbury and will continue to play in this league next season. Avonmouth OB, Coney Hill and Wells are all relegated to Western Counties North.

=== Participating teams and location ===
The 2015–16 South West 1 West consisted of fourteen teams; six from Somerset, four from Gloucestershire, two from Devon and one each from Bristol and Cornwall. Nine of the fourteen teams participated in last season's competition. The 2014–15 champions Cleve, and Ivybridge (via the play-off) were promoted to National League 3 South West. The relegated teams, Cullompton and St Austell will play in Western Counties West, and Matson will play in Western Counties North. The season started on 5 September 2015 and the last matches were played on 30 April 2016.

Locations of the 2015-16 South West 1 West teams

Team	Ground	Capacity	Town/Village	Previous season
Avonmouth Old Boys	Barracks Lane		Shirehampton, Bristol	9th
Bideford	King George's Field	2,000	Bideford, Devon	4th
Bridgwater & Albion	Bath Road	5,000 (600 seats)	Bridgwater, Somerset	3rd
Camborne	Recreation Ground	7,000 (780 seats)	Camborne, Cornwall	6th
Chard	The Park, Essex Close		Chard, Somerset	relegated from National League 3 South West
Clevedon	Coleridge Vale Playing Fields		Clevedon, Somerset	10th
Coney Hill	Metz Way		Coney Hill, Gloucester	promoted from Western Counties North (champions)
Drybrook	Mannings Ground		Drybrook, Gloucestershire	11th
Newent	Recreation Ground		Newent, Gloucestershire	promoted from Western Counties North (play-off)
North Petherton	Beggars Brook		North Petherton, Somerset	5th
Teignmouth	Bitton Park Sports Ground	1,210 (210 stand)	Teignmouth, Devon	promoted from Western Counties West (champions)
Thornbury	Cooper's Farm		Thornbury, Gloucestershire	7th
Wells	Charter Way		Wells, Somerset	8th
Weston-super-Mare	Recreation Ground	3,000	Weston-super-Mare, Somerset	relegated from National League 3 South West

=== League table ===
2015–16 South West 1 West League Table
		Played	Won	Drawn	Lost	Points for	Points against	Points diff	Try bonus	Loss bonus	Points
1	Camborne	26	23	0	3	774	306	468	15	2	110
2	Thornbury	26	19	0	7	779	411	368	14	5	95
3	Newent	26	20	1	5	594	395	199	9	3	94
4	Weston-super-Mare	26	16	0	10	685	530	155	8	5	77
5	Bideford	26	15	0	11	571	515	56	8	4	73
6	Drybrook	25	14	1	10	527	406	121	8	4	70
7	Bridgwater & Albion	26	14	0	12	452	553	−101	6	2	65
8	Clevedon	25	12	0	13	527	483	44	7	4	59
9	North Petherton	26	11	0	15	496	620	−124	7	5	56
10	Teignmouth	26	9	0	17	478	699	−221	10	5	52
11	Chard	26	8	1	17	535	613	−78	5	8	47
12	Wells	26	9	0	17	378	596	−218	1	4	41
13	Avonmouth Old Boys	26	7	1	18	465	653	−188	3	4	37
14	Coney Hill	26	2	0	24	296	777	−481	2	4	4
Points are awarded as follows: four points for a win; two points for a draw; no points for a loss; one bonus point for scoring four tries or more in a match; one bonus point for losing by seven points or less.; If teams are level at any stage, tiebreakers are applied in the following order: 1. Number of matches won 2. Difference between points for and against 3. Total number of points for 4. Aggregate number of points scored in matches between tied teams
Green background is the promotion place. Blue background is the play-off place. Pink background are relegation places. Updated: 29 April 2016

=== Promotion play-off ===
Each season, the runners-up in South West 1 East and South West 1 West, participate in a play-off for promotion to National League 3 South West. The team with the best playing record, in this case Salisbury, host the match and their opponents are Thornbury.

	Played	Won	Drawn	Lost	Points for	Points against	Points diff	Try bonus	Loss bonus	Points
Salisbury (P)	26	20	1	5	732	395	337	11	3	96
Thornbury	26	19	0	7	779	411	368	14	5	95

30 April 2016
15:00

Salisbury	26 – 24	Thornbury
	Thornbury

Castle Road
Attendance: 500
Referee: Zerren Bell

== 2014–15 ==
Cleve became champions with two matches to play and are promoted to National League 3 South West for next season. The team in second place, Ivybridge beat Towcestrians (the runner-up of South West 1 East) 25 – 20 in the play-off for promotion. St Austell and Cullompton are relegated to Western Counties West and Matson are relegated to Western Counties North.

=== Participating teams and location ===
The 2014–15 South West 1 West League consists of fourteen teams; four from Somerset, three each from Devon and Gloucestershire and two each from Bristol and Cornwall. The season started on 6 September 2014 and the last league matches were played on 18 April 2015; the play-off match was played a week later. Nine of the teams listed below participated in the South West 1 West last season. They were joined by Avonmouth OB who were relegated from National League 3 South West, Drybrook and Matson both promoted from Western Counties North, Ivybridge promoted from Western Counties West and Wells promoted from Southern Counties South.

Team	Ground	Capacity	Town/Village	Previous season
Avonmouth Old Boys	Barracks Lane		Shirehampton, Bristol	relegated from National League 3 South West
Bideford	King George's Field	2,000	Bideford, Devon	8th
Bridgwater & Albion	Bath Road	5,000 (600 seats)	Bridgwater, Somerset	9th
Camborne	Recreation Ground	7,000 (780 seats)	Camborne, Cornwall	3rd
Cleve	The Hayfields		Mangotsfield, Bristol	5th
Clevedon	Coleridge Vale Playing Fields		Clevedon, Somerset	11th
Cullompton	Stafford Park		Cullompton, Devon	10th
Drybrook	Mannings Ground		Drybrook, Gloucestershire	promoted from Western Counties North
Ivybridge	Cross-in-Hand		Ivybridge, Devon	promoted from Western Counties West
Matson	Redwell Road		Matson, Gloucester	promoted from Western Counties North
North Petherton	Beggars Brook		North Petherton, Somerset	6th
St Austell	Tregorrick Park	4,000 (300 seats)	St Austell, Cornwall	4th
Thornbury	Cooper's Farm		Thornbury, Gloucestershire	7th
Wells	Charter Way		Wells, Somerset	promoted from Southern Counties South

=== League table ===
2014–15 South West 1 West League Table
		Played	Won	Drawn	Lost	Points for	Points against	Points diff	Try bonus	Loss bonus	Points
1	Cleve	26	22	0	4	705	376	329	17	2	107
2	Ivybridge (P)	26	18	0	8	760	596	164	17	5	94
3	Bridgwater & Albion	26	16	0	10	669	505	164	16	5	80
4	Bideford	26	14	1	11	681	603	78	13	5	76
5	North Petherton	26	15	1	10	659	590	69	11	5	73
6	Camborne	26	13	0	13	638	580	58	11	8	71
7	Thornbury	26	12	2	12	583	591	−8	11	3	66
8	Wells	26	12	1	13	610	569	41	9	5	64
9	Avonmouth Old Boys	26	12	2	12	509	580	−71	7	3	62
10	Clevedon	26	11	2	13	558	565	−7	6	6	60
11	Drybrook	26	12	1	13	436	511	−75	4	5	59
12	Matson	26	9	0	17	552	686	−134	8	7	51
13	St Austell	26	7	0	19	463	607	−144	5	6	39
14	Cullompton	26	4	0	22	441	905	−464	3	3	22
Points are awarded as follows: four points for a win; two points for a draw; no points for a loss; one bonus point for scoring four tries or more in a match; one bonus point for losing by seven points or less.; If teams are level at any stage, tiebreakers are applied in the following order: 1. Number of matches won 2. Difference between points for and against 3. Total number of points for 4. Aggregate number of points scored in matches between tied teams
Green background is the promotion place. Blue background is the play-off place. Pink background are relegation places. Updated: 23 April 2015

=== Promotion play-off ===
Each season, the runners-up in South West 1 East and South West 1 West, participate in a play-off for promotion to National League 3 South West. The team with the best playing record, in this case Towcestrians, hosts the match; their opponents were Ivybridge who won 25 – 20.

	Played	Won	Drawn	Lost	Points for	Points against	Points diff	Try bonus	Loss bonus	Points
Towcestrians	26	21	0	5	704	405	299	15	3	103
Ivybridge (P)	26	18	0	8	760	596	164	17	5	94

25 April 2015
15:00

Towcestrians	20 – 25	Ivybridge
	report

Greens Norton Road

== 2013–14 ==
=== Participating teams and location ===
Team	Ground	Capacity	Town/Village	Previous season
Bideford	King George's Field	2,000	Bideford, Devon	promoted from Western Counties West
Bridgwater & Albion	College Way	5,000 (600 seats)	Bridgwater, Somerset	
Camborne	Recreation Ground	7,000 (780 seats)	Camborne, Cornwall	
Chard	The Park		Chard, Somerset	
Cleve	The Hayfields		Mangotsfield, Bristol	
Clevedon	Coleridge Vale Playing Fields		Clevedon, Somerset	
Coney Hill	Metz Way		Gloucester, Gloucestershire	switched from South West 1 East
Cullompton	Stafford Park		Cullompton, Devon	
Hornets	Hutton Moor Park	1,100 (stand)	Weston-super-Mare, Somerset	promoted from Western Counties North
North Petherton	Beggars Brook		North Petherton, Somerset	
Sidmouth	Blackmore Field		Sidmouth, Devon	
St Austell	Tregorrick Park	4,000 (300 seats)	St Austell, Cornwall	promoted from Western Counties West
Thornbury	Cooper's Farm		Thornbury, Gloucestershire	
Wadebridge Camels	Molesworth Field	500	Wadebridge, Cornwall	

== 2012–13 ==
- Bridgwater & Albion (relegated from National League 3 South West)
- Camborne
- Chard
- Cleve
- Clevedon
- Cullompton
- North Dorset
- North Petherton
- Old Redcliffians (relegated from National League 3 South West)
- Oldfield Old Boys
- Paignton Saxons
- Sidmouth
- Thornbury
- Wadebridge Camels

== Original teams ==
When league rugby began in 1987 this division (known as South West 2) contained the following teams:

- Barnstaple
- Berry Hill
- Brixham
- Cinderford
- Devon & Cornwall Police
- Devonport Services
- Henley
- Launceston
- Newbury
- Reading
- Reading Abbey

== Regional 2 South West honours ==
=== South West 2 (1987–1993) ===
Originally South West 1 West and South West 1 East were combined in a single division called South West 2. It was a tier 6 league with promotion to South West 1 and relegation to either Western Counties (Note: Western Counties is currently split into regional divisions known as Western Counties North and Western Counties West.) or Southern Counties (Note: Southern Counties is currently split into two regional divisions known as Southern Counties North and Southern Counties South.).

South West 2
Season	No of teams	No of matches	Champions	Runners-up	Relegated teams	Ref
1987–88	11	10	Berry Hill	Reading	Newbury, Devonport Services	
1988–89	11	10	Matson	Brixham	Launceston, Devon & Cornwall Police	
1989–90	11	10	Gordon League	Torquay Athletic	Bridgwater & Albion	
1990–91	11	10	Cinderford	Newbury	Redingensians, Bournemouth	
1991–92	11	10	Henley	Sherborne (Note: 3rd place Penryn were also promoted.)	Reading Abbey	
1992–93	13	12	Stroud	Barnstaple	Old Culverhaysians	

=== South West 2 ===
The top six teams from South West 1 and the top six from London 1 were combined to create National 5 South, meaning that South West 2 dropped one level to tier 7. Promotion continued to South West 1 and relegation to either Western Counties (Note: Western Counties is currently split into regional divisions known as Western Counties North and Western Counties West.) or Southern Counties (Note: Southern Counties is currently split into two regional divisions known as Southern Counties North and Southern Counties South.).

South West 2 honours
Season	No of teams	No of matches	Champions	Runners-up	Relegated teams	Ref
1993–94	13	12	Gloucester Old Boys	Taunton	Windsor	
1994–95	13	12	Matson	Bridgwater & Albion	Marlow	
1995–96	13	12	Launceston	Stroud	No relegation (Note: There was no relegation this season due to restructuring of the league system by the RFU.)	

=== South West 2 West (1996–2009) ===
League restructuring by the RFU for the 1996–97 season saw South West 2 split into two regional divisions known as South West 2 West and South West 2 East, and the cancellation of National 5 South meant that both divisions became tier 6 leagues. Promotion continued to South West 1, while relegation was now to either Western Counties North or Western Counties West (Note: Western Counties North or Western Counties West were formerly part of a single division known as Western Counties.).

South West 2 West
Season	No of teams	No of matches	Champions	Runners-up	Relegated teams	Ref
1996–97	12	22	Penzance-Newlyn	Spartans	Devonport Services, Combe Down	
1997–98	12	22	Old Patesians	Keynsham	Okehampton	
1998–99	12	22	Cinderford	Dings Crusaders	St Ives	
1999–00	12	22	Truro	Brixham	Tiverton, Taunton Titans, Spartans	
2000–01	14	26	Dings Crusaders	Stroud	St Austell, Clevedon, Penryn	
2001–02	12	22	Truro	Berry Hill	Camborne, Cheltenham North	
2002–03	12	22	St Mary's Old Boys	Clevedon	Torquay Athletic, Matson	
2003–04	12	22	Gloucester Old Boys	Penryn	Crediton, Taunton Titans, Thornbury	
2004–05	12	22	Spartans	Coney Hill	Gordon League, Stroud, Barnstaple	
2005–06	12	22	Mounts Bay	St Ives	Truro, Berry Hill, Gloucester Old Boys	
2006–07	12	22	Coney Hill	Brixham	Penryn, Spartans	
2007–08	12	22	Exmouth	Barnstaple	Hornets, Barton Hill, Camborne	
2008–09	12	22	Taunton Titans	Newton Abbot	Walcot	

=== South West 1 West (2009–2022) ===
League restructuring by the RFU meant that South West 2 West and South East 2 East were renamed as South West 1 West and South West 1 East, with both leagues remaining at tier 6. Promotion was to National League 3 South West (Note: National League 3 South West was renamed South West Premier.), while relegation continued to either Western Counties North or Western Counties West.

South West 1 West
Season	No of teams	No of matches	Champions	Runners-up	Relegated teams	Ref
2009–10	14	26	Hartpury College	Newton Abbot	Torquay Athletic, St Mary's Old Boys, Yatton	
2010–11	14	26	Chippenham	Old Redcliffians	St Ives, Walcot, Ivybridge	
2011–12	14	26	Brixham	Avonmouth Old Boys	Penryn, Berry Hill, Chosen Hill Former Pupils	
2012–13	14	26	Old Redcliffians	Camborne	Oldfield Old Boys, Paignton, North Dorset	
2013–14	14	26	Hornets	Chard	Wadebridge Camels, Coney Hill, Sidmouth	
2014–15	14	26	Cleve	Ivybridge	Matson, St Austell, Cullompton	
2015–16	14	26	Camborne	Thornbury	Wells, Avonmouth Old Boys, Coney Hill	
2016–17	14	26	Weston-super-Mare	Clevedon	Midsomer Norton, Kingsbridge, Chard	
2017–18	14	26	Drybrook	Exeter University	Clevedon, Bideford, Matson	
2018–19	14	26	Okehampton	Launceston	Coney Hill, Cullompton, Teignmouth	
2019–20	13 (Note: League reduced to 13 teams following the withdrawal of St Ives.)	20 (Note: Due to the COVID-19 pandemic in the United Kingdom the RFU cancelled all rugby below the Premiership with most clubs in Tribute South West 1 West having played 20 games, and a best playing record formula was used to decide the final table.)	Hornets	Lydney	Newton Abbot, Cleve	
2020–21	Cancelled due to COVID-19 pandemic in the United Kingdom.					
2021–22	13	24	Chew Valley	Devonport Services	No relegation	
Green background are the promotion places.

=== Regional 2 South West (2022– ) ===
League restructuring by the RFU created twelve leagues at level six. The champions are promoted to Regional 1 South West and the bottom two sides are relegated, depending on location, to either Counties 1 Western West, Counties 1 Western North or Counties 1 Southern South.

South West 1 West
Season	No of teams	No of matches	Champions	Runners-up	Relegated teams	Ref
2022–23	12	26	St Austell	Crediton	Sherborne (11th), Bridgwater & Albion (12th)	
2023–24	12	26	Sidmouth	Wadebridge Camels	Burnham-on-Sea (11th), Chard (12th)	
2024–25	12	26	Topsham	Crediton	Truro (11th), Newton Abbot (12th)	
2025–26	12	26	Weston-super-Mare	Tiverton	Cullompton (11th), Wellington (12th)	
Green background is the promotion place.

== Promotion play-offs ==
From season 2000–01 through to 2018–19 there has been a play-off, between the league runners-up of South West 1 East and South West 1 West, for the third and final promotion place to South West Premier. The team with the superior league record had home advantage. At the end of the 2018–19 season the South West 1 West teams' have been the stronger with thirteen wins to the South West 1 East teams' six, while the home team has won promotion thirteen times to the away teams six.

South West 1 (east v west) promotion play-off results
Season	Home	Score	Away	Venue	Attendance
2000–01	Stroud (W)	37–8	Slough (E)	Fromehall Park, Stroud, Gloucestershire	
2001–02	Chippenham (E)	5–20	Berry Hill (W)	Allington Fields, Chippenham, Wiltshire	
2002–03	Clevedon (W)	22–8	Swanage & Wareham (E)	Coleridge Vale Playing Fields, Clevedon, Somerset	
2003–04	Swanage & Wareham (E)	19–23	Penryn (W)	Bestwall Road, Dorset	
2004-05	Chippenham (E)	24–18	Coney Hill (W)	Allington Fields, Chippenham, Wiltshire	
2005–06	Swanage & Wareham (E)	10–26	St Ives (W)	Bestwall Road, Dorset	
2006–07	Bournemouth (E)	43–12	Brixham (W)	Chapel Gate, Bournemouth, Dorset	
2007–08	Barnstaple (W)	17–6	Salisbury (E)	Pottington Road, Barnstaple, Devon	
2008–09	Reading (E)	16–10	Newton Abbot (W)	Holme Park, Sonning, Reading, Berkshire	
2009–10	Newton Abbot (W)	23–14	High Wycombe (E)	Rackerhayes, Newton Abbot, Devon	
2010–11	Old Redcliffians (W)	52–8	Maidenhead (E)	Scotland Lane, Brislington, Bristol	
2011–12	Salisbury (E)	13–13 (aet) (Note: After extra time the game was tied with each sides having 2 tries each. As a result Avonmouth Old Boys were awarded the victory by virtue of being the away side.)	Avonmouth Old Boys (W)	Castle Road, Salisbury, Wiltshire	
2012–13	Old Centralians (E)	25–15	Camborne (W)	Saintbridge Sports Centre, Gloucester, Gloucestershire	500
2013–14	Towcestrians (E)	18–22	Chard (W)	Greens Norton Road, Towcester, Northamptonshire	
2014–15	Towcestrians (E)	20–25	Ivybridge (W)	Greens Norton Road, Towcester, Northamptonshire	
2015–16	Salisbury (E)	26–24	Thornbury (W)	Castle Road, Salisbury, Wiltshire	500
2016–17	Newbury Blues (E)	25−22	Clevedon (W)	Monk's Lane, Newbury, Berkshire	
2017–18	Exeter University (W)	42−31	Banbury (E)	Topsham Sports Ground, Exeter, Devon	
2018–19	Launceston (W)	33–22	Old Centralians (E)	Polson Bridge, Launceston, Cornwall	1,200
2019–20	Cancelled due to COVID-19 pandemic in the United Kingdom. Best ranked runner up – Royal Wootton Bassett (E) – promoted instead.				
2020–21	Season cancelled due to COVID-19 pandemic in the United Kingdom.				
2021–22	Cancelled due to the reorganisation of the league structure				
Green backgrounds represent promoted teams. E stands for South West 1 East while W stands for South West 1 West (or SW2E/SW2W for versions prior to 2009).

== Number of league titles ==
- Cinderford (2) (Note: One of Cinderford's titles was when league was merged as South West 2.)
- Hornets (2)
- Matson (2) (Note: Both of Matson's titles were when league was merged as South West 2.)
- Old Patesians (2) (Note: One of Old Patesians titles was when league was merged as South West 2.)
- Truro (2)
- Weston-super-Mare (2)
- Berry Hill (1) (Note: Berry Hill's title was when league was merged as South West 2.)
- Camborne (1)
- Chew Valley (1)
- Chippenham (1)
- Cleve (1)
- Coney Hill (1)
- Drybrook (1)
- Exmouth (1)
- Gloucester Old Boys (1) (Note: Gloucester Old Boys title was when league was merged as South West 2.)
- Gordon League (1) (Note: Gordon League's title was when league was merged as South West 2.)
- Hartpury College (1)
- Henley (1) (Note: Henley's title was when league was merged as South West 2.)
- Launceston (1) (Note: Launceston's title was when league was merged as South West 2.)
- Mounts Bay (1)
- Okehampton (1)
- Old Redcliffians (1)
- Penzance-Newlyn (1)
- Sidmouth (1)
- Spartans (1)
- St Austell (1)
- St Mary's Old Boys (1)
- Stroud (1) (Note: Stroud's title was when league was merged as South West 2.)
- Taunton Titans (1)
- Topsham (1)

== Summary of tier six format since 1987 ==
Format of the sixth-tier rugby union leagues in South-west England
Year	Name	No of teams	No of matches
1987–92	South West 2	11	10
1992–93	South West 2	13	12
1993–95	South West 1	13	12
1995–96	South West 1	13	12
1996–00	South West 2 West	12	22
2000–01	South West 2 West	14	26
2001–09	South West 2 West	12	22
2009–22	South West 1 West	14	26
2022–	Regional 2 South West	12	22

== See also ==
- South West Division RFU
- Cornwall RFU
- Devon RFU
- Gloucestershire RFU
- Somerset RFU
- English rugby union system
