= Ivybridge RFC =

English rugby union club, based in Devon

Ivybridge
- Full name: Ivybridge Rugby Club
- Union: Devon RFU
- Founded: 1975; 51 years ago
- Location: Ivybridge, Devon, England
- Ground: Cross-in-Hand
- League: Regional 2 South West
- 2025–26: 6th

Ivybridge Rugby Club is an English rugby union club based in Ivybridge, Devon. The first XV team currently play in Regional 2 South West, the 6th tier of the English rugby union system following their relegation from Regional 1 South West in season 2024–25.

== Honours ==
- Havill Plate winners: 1982
- Devon Junior Cup winners (4): 1988, 1989, 1991, 1995
- Devon Intermediate Cup winners: 2013
- Tribute Western Counties West champions (2): 1999–2000, 2013–14
- South West 1 (east v west) promotion play-off winner: 2014–15
- Devon Senior Cup winners: 2018
