= David Brewerton =

English author and journalist

David Brewerton (born 25 February 1943) is an English author and journalist. He was born in London, England which is still his home city. He was educated in the East End of London at Coopers' Company School.

== Career ==
After a short spell in the securities industry, Brewerton moved into financial journalism working initially for the Exchange Telegraph newswire. In the late sixties he joined the Financial Times and in 1970 moved to the City desk of The Daily Telegraph. Brewerton moved again in 1986 when he helped found The Independent as City Editor and was awarded the London Business School Prize as Financial Journalist Of The Year. During his time at The Independent he was responsible for breaking most of the stories on the notorious Guinness Affair which led to several leading businessmen—including Gerald Ronson and Ernest Saunders—being sent to prison. In 1988 Brewerton was recruited by Rupert Murdoch as Executive Editor of The Times Business News. At the end of his agreed contract with Murdoch, Brewerton became a partner in the public relations consultancy Brunswick where he advised corporations on how to deal with the media. He left the business in 2002 to develop his third career as an author and freelance journalist. In journalism, he specialises in writing obituaries of business personalities, principally for The Guardian newspaper.

Brewerton's first full-length novel, Impeccable Sources, was published in 2007 and draws on his experience of newspapers and in particular of investigative stories. His second novel, Dancing to Domino, deals with the question of how long a childhood promise can last. His non-fiction work includes A History of the Mercantile and General Reinsurance Company.
