= Devon RFU Intermediate Cup =

English rugby union club competition

Devon Intermediate Cup
- Sport: Rugby Union
- Instituted: 2009; 17 years ago
- Number of teams: 6 (Cup); 8 (Shield)
- Country: England
- Holders: Sidmouth (2nd title) (2018–19)
- Most titles: Bideford, Sidmouth (2 titles)
- Website: Devon RFU

The Devon Intermediate Cup is an annual rugby union knock-out club competition organized by the Devon Rugby Football Union. It was first introduced during the 2009-10 season with Okehampton being the inaugural winners. The competition was briefly discontinued at the end of the 2015-16 season due to a perceived lack of interest from clubs with the 2014 final being cancelled and the 2016 winners, Kingsbridge, only playing one game (the final) due to teams being unable/or unwilling to fulfil fixtures. It was reinstated once more for the 2017-18 season.

The Intermediate Cup is currently the secondary cup competition in the county behind the Devon Senior Cup but ahead of the Devon Junior Cup, for club sides based in Devon that play in tier 7 (Tribute Western Counties West) of the English rugby union league system. Since 2018–19 the format will change from a knockout cup competition to a hybrid league-cup. Running alongside it will be the Devon Intermediate Shield, which is for club sides in Devon that play in tier 8 (Tribute Cornwall/Devon) and will also use the a hybrid league-cup format.

== Format from 2018–19 ==
=== Intermediate Cup ===
Previously a knockout cup competition, for the 2018-19 season the format has been changed to a mini league, with league results between Devon teams playing in Tribute Western Counties West also counted towards the Devon Intermediate Cup. At the end of the season the top two teams in this mini-league will then meet in the cup final, to be held at the home ground of the club with the superior league record. It is worth noting that these top two teams will not necessary be the highest ranked sides in Tribute Western Counties West, as only games played against teams in Devon will count in the Intermediate Cup.

=== Intermediate Shield ===
Running alongside the Intermediate is the Devon Intermediate Plate. This will also involve a mini league with results for the Devon teams in Tribute Cornwall/Devon counting towards the Shield, with the two top teams meeting in a final at the end of the season, at the home ground of the club with the superior record.

== Devon Intermediate Cup winners ==
Devon Intermediate Cup Finals
Season	Winner	Score	Runners–up	Venue
2009-10	Okehampton	20-15	Crediton	Showfield, Okehampton
2010-11	Bideford	45-12	Crediton	Blagdon, Crediton
2011-12	Bideford	51-17	Okehampton	King George's Field, Bideford
2012-13	Ivybridge	29-27	Crediton	Blagdon, Crediton
2013-14	Cancelled (Note: the 2013-14 final was due to be played between Bideford and Ivybridge but was cancelled as hosts Bideford could not agree a date for the game.)			
2014-15	Teignmouth	29-23	Kingsbridge	High House, Kingsbridge
2015-16	Kingsbridge	20-0	Crediton	Blagdon, Crediton
2016-17	No competition			
2017-18	Sidmouth	27-24	Cullompton	Stafford Park, Cullompton
2018-19	Sidmouth	39-19	Crediton	Blackmore Field, Sidmouth

== Devon Intermediate Plate winners ==
Devon Intermediate Plate Finals
Season	Winner	Score	Runners–up	Venue
2009-10	Honiton		Teignmouth	Bitton Park, Teignmouth
2010-11	Torquay Athletic	50-11	Honiton	Recreation Ground, Torquay

== Devon Intermediate Shield winners ==
Devon Intermediate Shield Finals
Season	Winner	Score	Runners–up	Venue
2017-18	Withycombe	29-15	Honiton	Raleigh Park, Exmouth
2018-19	Honiton	46-0	Plymstock Albion Oaks	Allhallows Playing Field, Honiton

== Number of wins ==
=== Cup ===
- Bideford (2)
- Sidmouth (2)
- Ivybridge (1)
- Kingsbridge (1)
- Okehampton (1)
- Teignmouth (1)

=== Plate ===
- Honiton (1)
- Torquay Athletic (1)

=== Shield ===
- Honiton (1)
- Withycombe (1)

== See also ==
- Devon RFU
- Devon Senior Cup
- Devon Junior Cup
- David Butt Memorial Trophy
- Havill Plate
- English rugby union system
- Rugby union in England
