= Okehampton RFC =

English rugby union club, based in Devon

- Full name: Okehampton Rugby Football Club
- Union: Devon RFU
- Nickname: The Okes
- Founded: 1884; 142 years ago
- Location: Okehampton, Devon, England
- Ground: Showground (Capacity: 1,120 (120 seats))
- Chairman: John Shields
- President: Lloyd Thomas
- Coach: Brett Luxton
- Captain: Luke Simmons
- League: Regional 2 South West
- 2025–26: 4th
Team kit

Official website
- www.pitchero.com/clubs/okehampton

Okehampton RFC is an English rugby union club, formed in 1884 and based in Okehampton, Devon. The club has three senior men's teams (including veterans), a women's team, a colts team and multiple junior teams (u-7 to u-16) catering for boys and girls. Nicknamed the 'Okes' the club's colours are maroon and amber and they play home games at the Showground. The first team currently play in the Regional 2 South West, a league at tier 6 of the English rugby union system, having been relegated from Regional 1 South West at the end of the 2023–24 season.

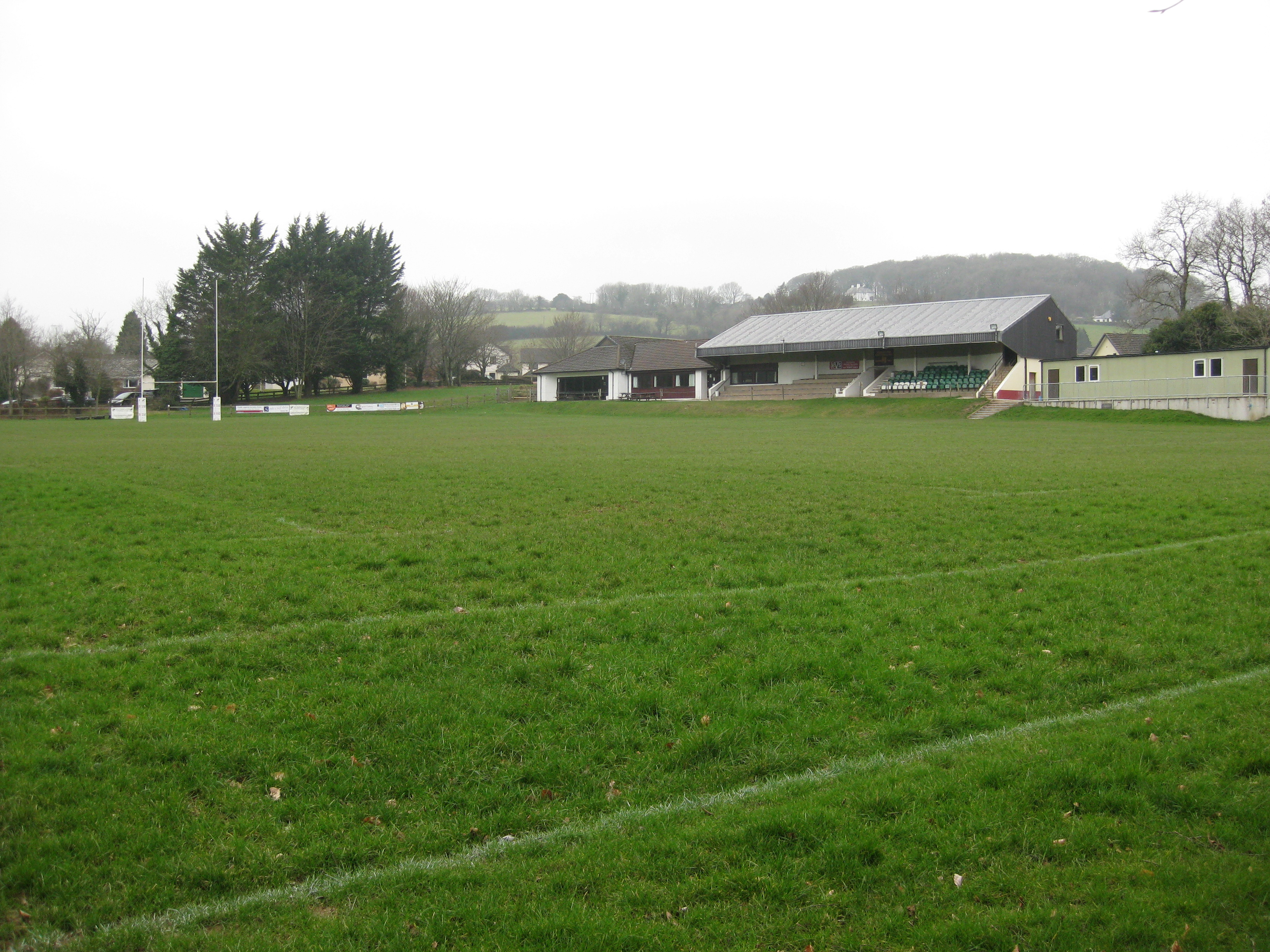
The Showground, home of Okehampton RFC

== History ==
=== Early history ===
Okehampton had a rugby team dating back as far as 1884, and by 1902 had registered with the Devon Rugby Football Union. The club moved grounds several times during the early days, starting at Northams Meadows in 1902, switching to North Road in 1912 and then Cowlands Field at Mill Road in the 1920s. The outbreak of World War II caused the club to close as many players went into the Armed Forces. After the war was over, the club's former ground, Cowlands Field, was sold for housing development, and they had to share with the local football side, Okehampton Argyle, at Simmonds Park. The club had initially suffered a shortage of senior players after the war but the local grammar school provided a stream of new players, while soldiers at the nearby army camp, some of whom would go on to become international players, were available from time to time.

The 1950s saw the club have a period of mixed fortunes. The introduction of rugby union in the secondary modern school would later pave the way for a colts team, while the men's senior team would go unbeaten between 1951 and 1953. By 1955 many of the players had retired and the club had several seasons of poor results but by 1958 they were back on track. By 1961 the club had moved away from Simmons Park to purchase its own ground at Oaklands, where it has remained ever since. This ground had a small grandstand, a bar, changing room facilities, as well as several school pitches across the road from the main ground, where colts and junior games could take place. With a new ground, Okehampton went from strength to strength winning the Devon County Havill Plate competition in 1979, the Devon Merit Table "B" in 1982–83 and the Devon Merit Table "A" in 1983–84.

=== League rugby ===
On the advent of league rugby union in 1987, Okehampton were placed in the Western Counties league (tier 7 of the English league system) where they remained until 1996–97 when they gained promotion as champions to South West 2 West. Their stay in tier 6 (the highest level the club have reached) was short lived and they were relegated after just one season in the division. The club also punched well above its weight in the Devon Senior Cup, appearing as losing finalists against Plymouth Albion in 1988 and Barnstaple in 1997. After a period of relative stability the club would drop down the leagues, first being relegation from Tribute Western Counties West in 2002–03 and then being relegated from Tribute Cornwall/Devon in 2004–05 in what would be the club's worst spell in its league history so far.

From the worst spell in its modern history, Okehampton would regroup and enter one of its best. They won a league and cup double in the 2005–06, winning promotion from Devon League 1 and claiming the Devon RFU Junior Cup for the first time, defeating league rivals Cullompton 8–3 in the final. The 2008–09 season saw the club promoted from Tribute/Cornwall Devon in second place and the following season saw them win the inaugural Devon Intermediate Cup defeating Tiverton on the final. In 2016 the club returned to tier 6 by winning the Tribute Western Counties West league title.

In 2019 Okehampton reached the highest level in the club's league history when it won promotion to South West Premier (level 5) after finishing as the 2018–19 Tribute South West 1 West champions. They also made it a league and cup double when they won the inaugural Devon RFU Shield by beating Devonport Services in a closely contested final at the Showground.

== Ground ==
Okehampton RFC have been based at the Showground since 1961. The ground is situated on Glendale Road next to Okehampton Primary School in a pleasant residential area in the north-west of town, and consists of a club-house and attached stand, a main pitch and a secondary pitch just across the road for 2nd XV and junior fixtures. The ground is quite compact meaning that the capacity is limited to about 1,000 standing, plus another 120 seats in the grandstand, bringing total capacity to approximately 1,120. Parking is extremely limited in and around the ground, although if you do not mind a 5-10 minute walk (admittedly uphill) then there is plenty of parking in town.

== Season summary ==
Season	League			National Cup(s)		County Cup(s)	
Season	Competition/Level	Position	Points	Competition	Performance	Competition	Performance
1987–88	Western Counties (7)					Devon Senior Cup	Runners up
1988–89	Western Counties (7)			Pilkington Cup	1st Round		
1989–90	Western Counties (7)						
1990–91	Western Counties (7)						
1991–92	Western Counties (7)						
1992–93	Western Counties (7)						
1993–94	Western Counties (7)						
1994–95	Western Counties (7)			Pilkington Cup	1st Round		
1995–96	Western Counties (7)	7th	9				
1996–97	Western Counties West (7) (Note: Restructuring of the south west leagues by the RFU meant that Western Counties was split into two regional leagues; Western Counties West and Western Counties North.)	1st (promoted)	33			Devon Senior Cup	Runners up
1997–98	South West 2 West (6)	12th (relegated)	4	Tetley's Bitter Cup	1st Round		
1998–99	Western Counties West (7)	7th	16				
1999–00	Western Counties West (7)	7th	17				
2000–01	Western Counties West (7)	6th	17				
2001–02	Western Counties West (7)	10th	13				
2002–03	Western Counties West (7)	11th (relegated)	13				
2003–04	Cornwall/Devon (8)	4th	25	Powergen Junior Vase	2nd Round		
2004–05	Cornwall/Devon (8)	10th (relegated)	15				
2005–06	Devon 1	1st (promoted)	40	Powergen Junior Vase		Devon Junior Cup	Winners
2006–07	Cornwall/Devon (8)	8th	20	EDF Energy Senior Vase	2nd Round		
2007–08	Cornwall/Devon (8)	5th	24	EDF Energy Senior Vase			
2008–09	Cornwall/Devon (8)	2nd (promoted)	34				
2009–10	Western Counties West (7)	5th	34			Devon Intermediate Cup	Winners
2010–11	Western Counties West (7)	5th	78 (Note: The 2010–11 season would see the introduction of bonus points into lower league English rugby union.)			Devon Intermediate Cup	Semi-finals
2011–12	Western Counties West (7)	5th	86			Devon Intermediate Cup	Runners up
2012–13	Western Counties West (7)	6th	70			Devon Intermediate Cup	1st Round
2013–14	Western Counties West (7)	9th	54			Devon Intermediate Cup	1st Round
2014–15	Western Counties West (7)	7th	66	RFU Intermediate Cup	5th Round	Devon Intermediate Cup	Semi-finals
2015–16	Western Counties West (7)	1st (promoted)	108	RFU Intermediate Cup	3rd Round	Devon Intermediate Cup	Semi-finals
2016–17	South West 1 West (6)	8th	64			Devon Senior Cup	Runners up
2017–18	South West 1 West (6)	5th	68			Devon Senior Cup	1st Round
2018–19	South West 1 West (6)	1st (promoted)	109			Devon Senior Shield	Winners
2019–20	South West Premier (5)	4th	67.20 (Note: The season was postponed and ultimately cancelled due to the COVID-19 pandemic in the United Kingdom with Okehampton sitting in 4th, having played 20 games and gained 56 points. The remaining games were calculated on a 'best playing record formula', with Okehampton remaining in 4th place with 67.20 points.)				
2020–21	South West Premier (5)	Cancelled due to COVID-19 pandemic in the United Kingdom.					
2021–22	South West Premier (5)	14th	31				
Green background stands for either league champions (with promotion) or cup winners. Blue background stands for promotion without winning league or losing cup finalists. Pink background stands for relegation.

== Honours ==
Men's 1XV

- Havill Plate winners: 1979
- Devon Merit Table "B" champions: 1982–83
- Devon Merit Table "A" champions: 1983–84
- Tribute Western Counties West champions (2): 1996–97, 2015–16
- Devon Junior Cup winners: 2006
- Devon League 1 champions: 2005–06
- Devon Intermediate Cup winners: 2010
- Tribute South West 1 West champions: 2018–19

Women XV

Women's NC3 South West (west) champions: 2023-24

Women's NC2 South West (west) champions: 2024-25

Women's Papa John's Junior Plate winners: 2024-25

Women's NC1 South West (west) champions: 2025-26

Colts XV

- Devon Colts Cup: 1982

== Notable former players ==
- Julian White – tighthead prop who played a couple of seasons at the club during his early career. Won 51 caps for England national rugby team as well as four caps for the British and Irish Lions.

== See also ==
- Devon RFU
