= Teignmouth R.F.C. =

Rugby union club in Devon, United Kingdom

Teignmouth RFC
- Full name: Teignmouth Rugby Football Club
- Union: Devon RFU
- Nickname: The Teigns
- Founded: 1874; 152 years ago
- Location: Teignmouth, Devon, England
- Ground: Bitton Park Sports Ground (Capacity: 1,210 (210 stand))
- Chairman: Mark Layton
- President: Andy Crossman
- Coach(es): Colin Stewart; Jack Bond
- Captain(s): George Franklin (Men's), Emily Sutcliffe (Women's)
- League: Regional 2 South West
- 2025–26: 10th
Team kit

Teignmouth Rugby Football Club is a rugby union club based in Teignmouth, Devon, England. The club runs two senior men's teams, a women's senior team, a veterans team, a colts team and a junior section for both girls and boys. The men's 1st XV currently play in Regional 2 South West – a league at level 6 of the English rugby union system. Since 2022, the club has also been home to Westcountry Wasps Rugby Football Club, Devon's oldest International Gay Rugby club.

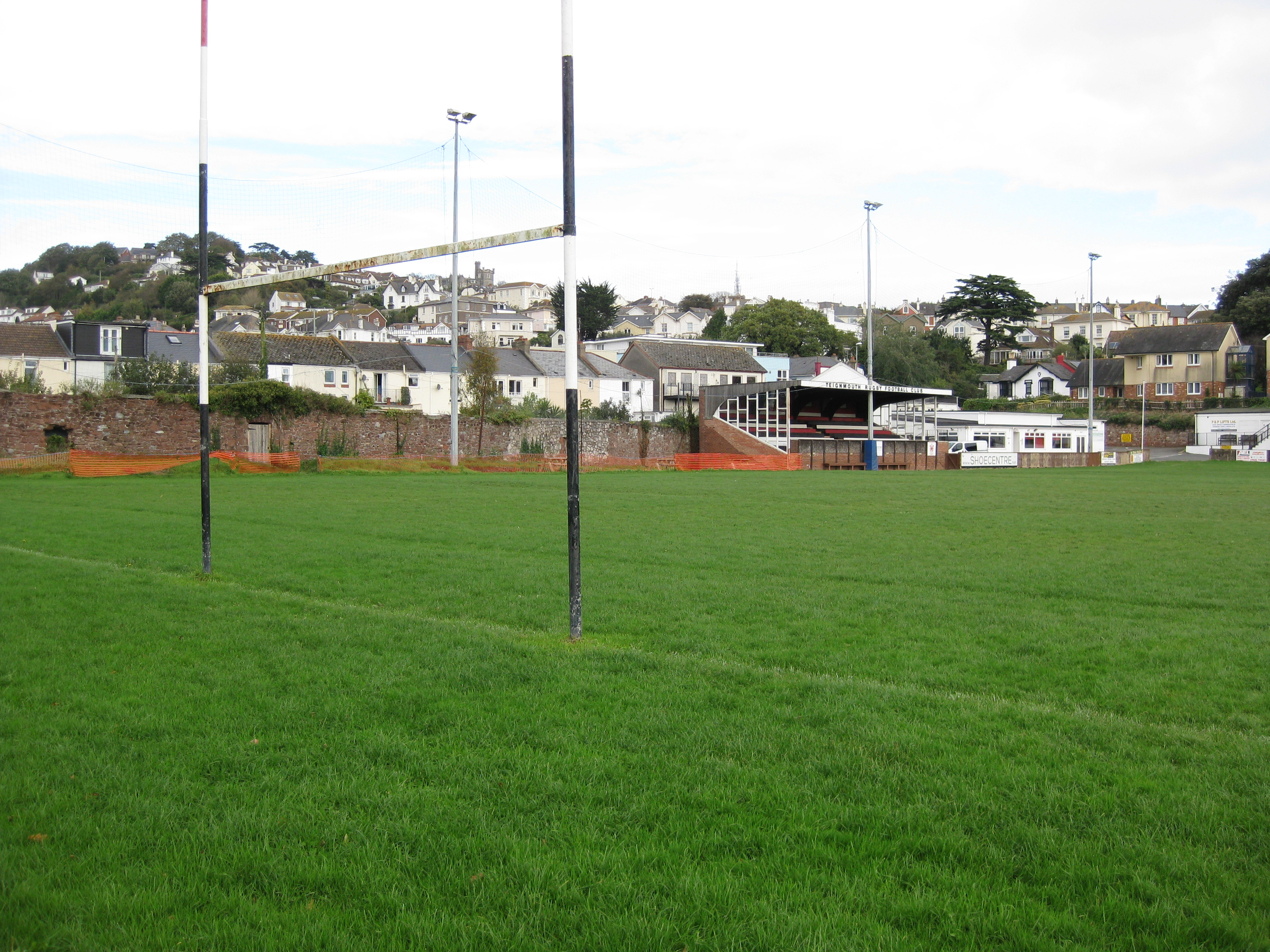
View of stand at Bitton Park, home of Teignmouth RFC

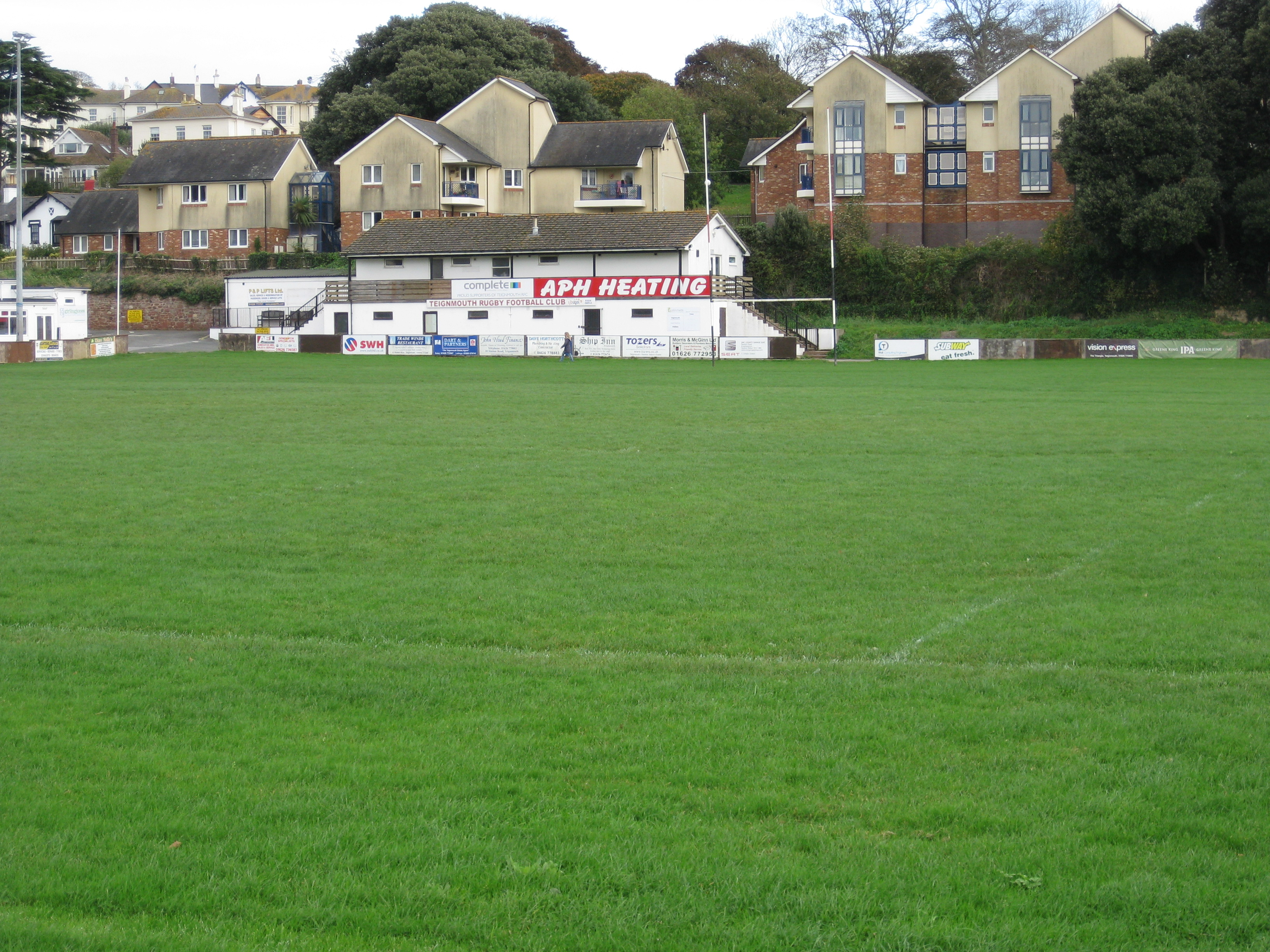
View of the Teignmouth RFC club house at Bitton Park

== History ==
Teignmouth RFC was officially formed in January 1874 and have played at Bitton Park Sports Ground since 1904, with the exception of the 1906–07 and 1982–83 seasons. When league rugby was launched in England for the 1987–88 season, Teignmouth were placed in the Cornwall & Devon league, where they remained for thirteen years.

The 2000–01 season was a bad year for Teignmouth Rugby Football Club. December 2000 saw the club closed down and put into administration due to an unpaid VAT bill. With the club facing closure a rescue package was launched with members raising enough money to buy the club out of administration. In a season badly affected by the foot and mouth crisis, which saw a number of games unplayed, Teignmouth finished mid-table but, due to the effects of relegation in higher divisions, Teignmouth were relegated to Devon League 1.

Teignmouth were only to spend one season in the lower division, finishing second and meeting the runner-up of Cornwall League 1, Mount's Bay, at their Penzance ground. Teignmouth won a hotly contested match, 17–14 to achieve promotion. Teignmouth once again found themselves relegated to Devon 1 in 2005–06. Teignmouth dominated the division and bounced straight back up as 2006–07 league champions.

The 2012–13 season was a successful one for Teignmouth; they comfortably won the Tribute Cornwall/Devon league and gained promotion to the Tribute Western Counties West league (the 7th tier of English rugby union league system). At the time, this was the highest level the club had ever competed at. The 2013–14 season saw Teignmouth finish second and reach a promotion play-off in their first season. Consecutive promotions proved to be a step too far, however, as they lost the play-off to Drybrook. The following year Teignmouth secured promotion to Tribute South West 1 West as 2014–15 league champions. To cap a memorable season, they also won the Devon Intermediate Cup, with victory against Kingsbridge.

The 2015–16 season saw Teignmouth reach their highest league position of 10th in South West 1 West. They did even better with an 8th placed finish at the end of the 2017–18 season. Unfortunately, this did not last as the club suffered a relegation to Western Counties West, finishing 12th out of 14th.

== Ground ==
Bitton Park Sports Ground is in the town of Teignmouth on the banks of the River Teign, next to the Teignmouth Bridge and within walking distance of the Teignmouth railway station. The ground has been occupied by the rugby club since 1904 and consists of a main pitch with a covered stand with seating, a club house, and a secondary pitch for seconds and youth fixtures. The main pitch has space for around 1,000 standing, which along with 210 in the stand brings the overall capacity to approximately 1,210. Alternative facilities are also available at Broadmeadow Pitches about 10 minutes up the road next to the Morrisons store.

== Honours ==
- Devon Junior Cup winners (2): 1902 (shared), 1912
- Devon Senior Cup winners: 1929
- Havill Plate winners: 1986
- Cornwall 1 v Devon 1 promotion play-off winners: 2001–02
- Tribute Devon 1 champions (2): 2006–07, 2008–09
- Tribute Cornwall/Devon champions: 2012–13
- Tribute Western Counties West champions: 2014–15
- Devon Intermediate Cup winners: 2015
