= Ronald Richardson =

English cricketer

Personal information
- Full name: Ronald Alfred Richardson
- Born: 10 November 1927; North Duffield, Yorkshire, England
- Died: 17 November 1998 (aged 71); Willaston, Cheshire, England
- Batting: Left-handed

Domestic team information
- Years: Team
- 1963–1970: Cheshire
- 1954/55– 1958/59: North Eastern Transvaal

Career statistics
Competition	First-class	List A
Matches	13	2
Runs scored	772	38
Batting average	33.56	19.00
100s/50s	1/3	–/–
Top score	140*	20
Balls bowled	–	–
Wickets	–	–
Bowling average	–	–
5 wickets in innings	–	–
10 wickets in match	–	–
Best bowling	–	–
Catches/stumpings	8/–	1/–
- Source: Cricinfo, 13 April 2011

Ronald Alfred Richardson (10 November 1927 – 17 November 1998) was an English cricketer. Richardson was a left-handed batsman. He was born in North Duffield, Yorkshire.

Richardson made his first-class debut for North Eastern Transvaa in South Africa against Rhodesia. Richardson played first-class cricket for the team from 1954 to 1958, representing them in 13 matches. In his 13 first-class matches he scored 772 runs at a batting average of 33.56, with two half centuries and a single century high score of 140* against Eastern Province.

Later returning to England, Richardson made his debut Cheshire in the 1963 Minor Counties Championship against the Yorkshire Second XI. Richardson played Minor counties cricket for Cheshire from 1963 to 1970, which included 24 Minor Counties Championship matches. He made two List A appearances in the 1968 Gillette Cup against Norfolk and Northamptonshire. In these two List A matches, he scored 38 runs at a batting average of 19.00, with a high score of 20.

He died in Willaston, Cheshire on 17 November 1998.
