= Prisca Coborn =

English philanthropist

- Born: Prisca Forster; 24 August 1622
- Died: 13 November 1701 (aged 79)
- Burial place: Bow Church, London Borough of Tower Hamlets, England

Prisca or Priscilla Coborn, Coburne or Colbourne (née Forster, 24 August 1622 – 13 November 1701) was a wealthy widow who lived in Middlesex, now in the East End of Greater London during the Stuart Era. She was a philanthropist who gave money to the poor and established a school for girls.

== Biography ==
Forster was the daughter of John Forster, a minister of Bow Church, where she was baptised on 30 August 1622. On her mother's side, she was descended from bakers, and inherited land locally and in Essex from her maternal grandfather, Thomas Skorier.

In 1675, Forster became the second wife of Thomas Coborn/Colbourne, a brewer in Bow, whose previous wife had died in January after giving birth to their daughter Alice. Thomas rewrote his will to include Prisca and Alice, and died a couple of months after the wedding. Alice Coborn died at the age of fifteen and was buried on what was to have been her wedding day. After her husband's death, Coborn carried on business as a brewer; she had over 900 barrels of strong beer and over 200 barrels of small beer in her cellars in 1698. She was generous to the poor, distributing £10 annuities in Bow on four days of the year known as Coborn Days (30 January, Maundy Thursday, Good Friday, and her birthday in August (which was also St Bartholomew's Day). In 1683, she donated a paten to Bow Church.

On her death in 1701, through the terms of her will, dated 6 May 1701, Prisca Coborn established the Coborn School for Girls in Bow. She also gave money to help the poor of Bow and Stepney in the East End of London, and bequeathed funds for an ornamental plaster ceiling in Bow Church. A ward in St Bartholomew's Hospital was named Coborn in recognition of her gifts. One of the bells in the church of St Dunstan's, Stepney was dedicated to Mrs. Prisca Coborn when cast in 1806. A historian writing in 1885 estimated that the value of her bequests to Bow parish for charitable and religious purposes was, in 1885, "equivalent to a capital sum of not less than £14,000".

Locally, she is remembered by the street names Coborn Road (called Cut Throat Lane before 1800) and Coborn Street, the Coborn Arms public house, and the Coborn Centre for Adolescent Mental Health.

She is buried at Bow Church, where a memorial to her (as Prisca Coburne) opposite that of her stepdaughter records her charitable bequests.
