= Lord Tredegar, Bow =

Pub in Bow, London

Coordinates: 51.528374°N 0.0335432°W

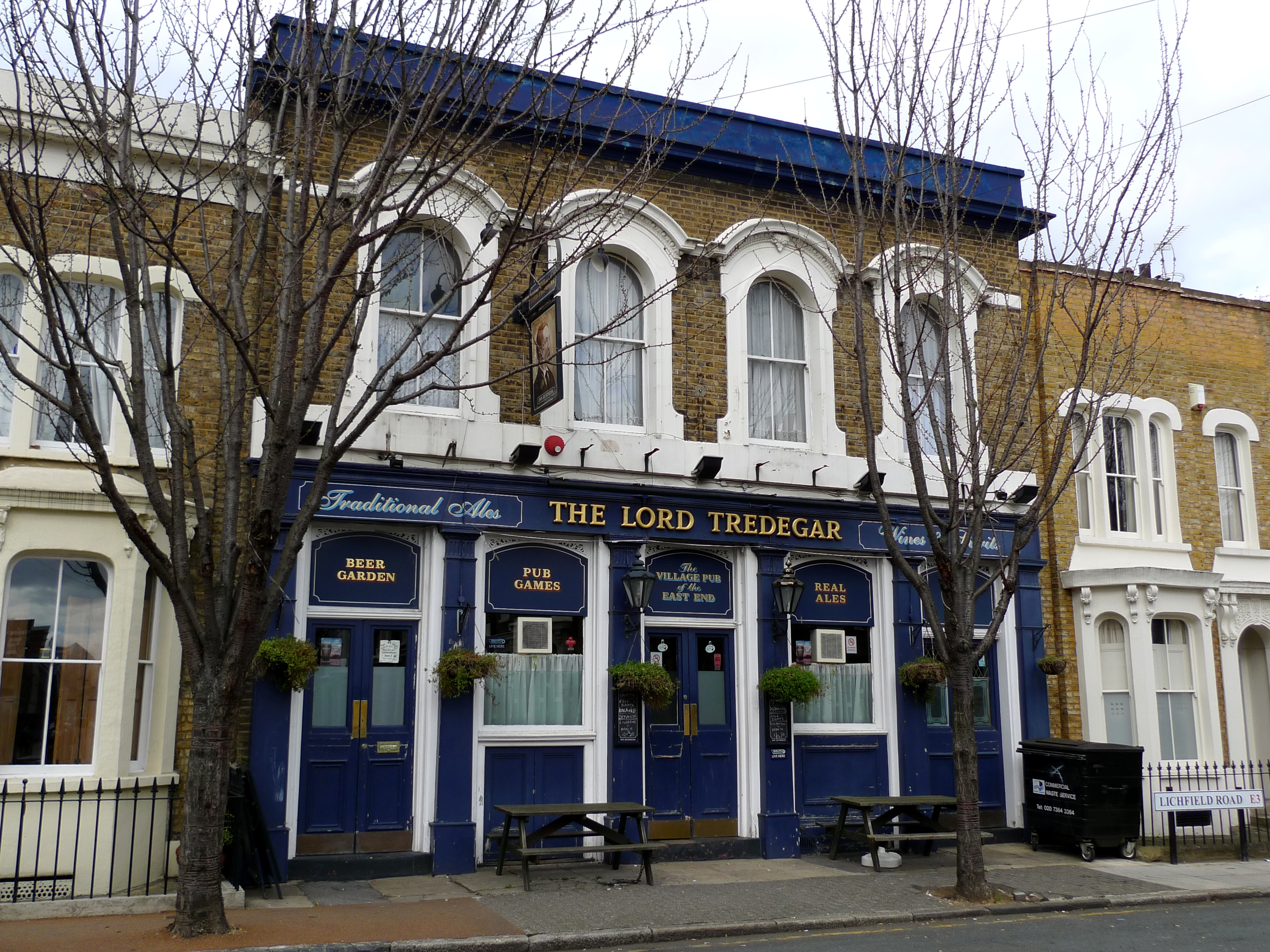
The Lord Tredegar, Mile End

The Lord Tredegar is a pub at 50 Lichfield Road, Mile End E3.

It is a Grade II listed building, built in the mid-19th century.

It is part of the Remarkable Pubs chain of 17 pubs in London.
