= King George's Fields =

Public open space in the United Kingdom, dedicated to the memory of King George V

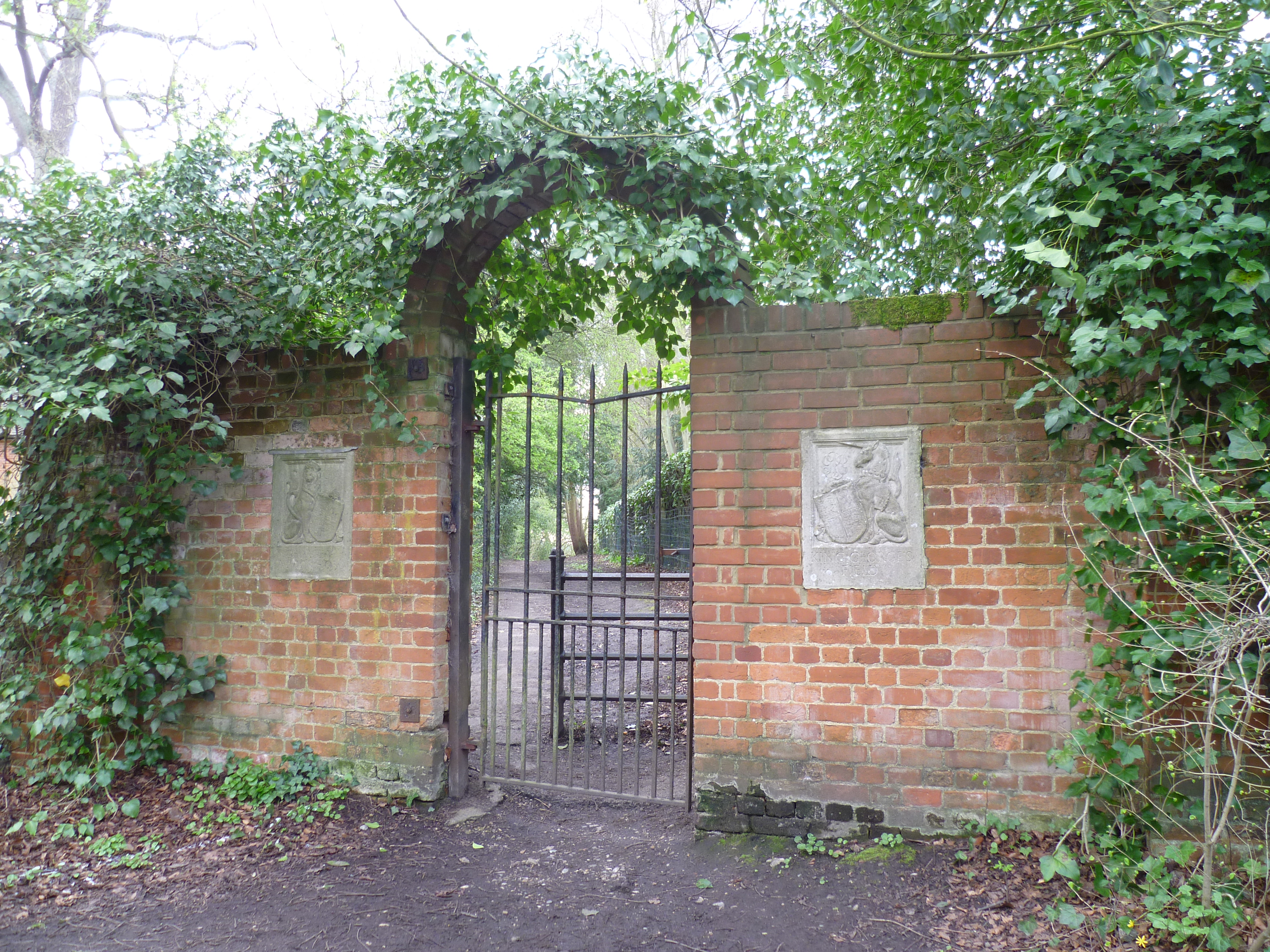
Entrance to the King George's Fields in Monken Hadley, north London

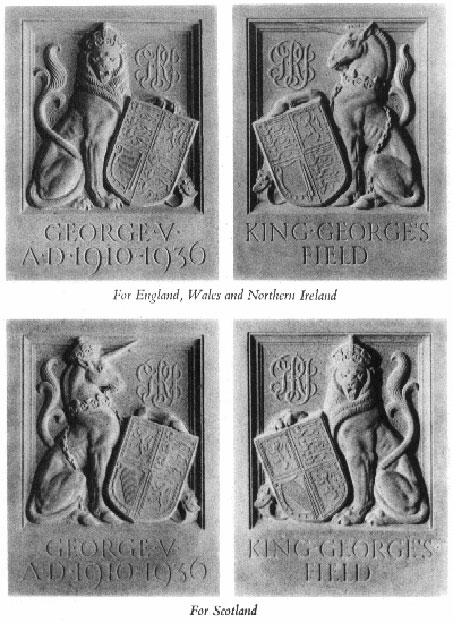
Common entrance plaques for King George's Fields

A King George's Field is a public open space in the United Kingdom dedicated to the memory of King George V (1865–1936).

In 1936, after the king's death, Sir Percy Vincent, the then–Lord Mayor of London, formed a committee to determine a memorial that was not solely based on the idea of a statue. They arrived the same year at the concept of funding and erecting a single statue in London and setting up the King George's Fields Foundation with the aim:

To promote and to assist in the establishment throughout the United Kingdom of Great Britain and Northern Ireland of playing fields for the use and enjoyment of the people.

Each of the playing fields would:

Be styled 'King George's Field' and to be distinguished by heraldic panels or other appropriate tablet medallion or inscription commemorative of His Late Majesty and of a design approved by the Administrative Council.

Money was raised locally to buy the land, with a grant made by the foundation. After purchase the land was passed to the National Playing Fields Association, (now known as Fields in Trust) to "preserve and safeguard the land for the public benefit". Land was still being acquired for the purpose during the 1950s and early 1960s.

When the King George's Fields Foundation was dissolved in 1965 there were 471 King George Playing Fields, all over the UK. They are now legally protected by Fields in Trust and managed locally by either the council or a board of local trustees.

There are covenants and conditions that ensure that the public will continue to benefit from these open play areas.

== History of the King George's Fields Foundation ==
=== Introduction ===
On 30 January 1936 upon the death of King George V, the then Lord Mayor of the City of London set up a committee to consider what form a national memorial to the King should take. In March 1936, the committee decided that there should be a statue in London and a philanthropic scheme of specific character that would benefit the whole country and be associated with King George V's name. As a result, in the November of that year, the King George's Fields Foundation was constituted by Trust Deed to give effect to the scheme. The urbanisation of the twentieth century in Great Britain was bringing home to many public-spirited people the fact that lack of open spaces must restrict the rising generation physically.

The aim of the Foundation was "to promote and to assist in the establishment throughout the United Kingdom of Great Britain and Northern Ireland of playing fields for the use and enjoyment of the people every such playing field to be styled 'King George's Field' and to be distinguished by heraldic panels or other appropriate tablet medallion or inscription commemorative of His Late Majesty and of a design approved by the Administrative Council."

The trust deed defined a 'Playing Field' as "any open space used for the purpose of outdoor games, sports and pastimes."

The project was to be a flexible one, focusing on urban areas, but not exclusively so, and carried out in each locality according to its requirements. It would enlist local interest and support, gratefully accepting gifts in the form of monies or land. Each field would have a distinctive uniform tablet as an appropriate visible commemoration of George V.

This was considered to be as the King would have wished, particularly in the service rendered to youth through providing for them an environment and opportunity for open air exercise, for the benefit of individual well-being and the general welfare of the nation.

=== The National Memorial Fund and 'Grant-in-aid Policy' ===
The purpose of the Foundation was to secure a living memorial by way of playing fields to the late sovereign, and that these open spaces be directly associated with that memory by being named 'King George's Fields'.

Playing fields were to be acquired, planned, equipped, maintained and safeguarded for recreational purposes in towns and villages throughout Great Britain and Northern Ireland. However, the cost required to acquire, construct and equip such fields for public use would prove too costly for the King George's Fields Foundation (KGFF) alone. To determine the best ways and means in which to remember George V, and to put in motion the necessary machinery to raise the required funds, a national appeal was set up. £557,436 was raised in the period just before the Second World War.

The Foundation found at the outset that half a million pounds was not enough to meet the costs of acquiring fields and maintaining them for all the places in the country where they were needed. The National Memorial Fund Committee had concluded that the maximum results might best be achieved by 'distributing the funds by way of grants-in-aid towards the capital costs of as many fields as possible', the balance of the capital required for each scheme to be raised by the local authorities or local bodies of Trustees managing and accepting responsibility for their maintenance as King George's Fields.

The plan of action came in the form of what was to be called Grant-in-Aid Policy set up on 1 March 1937. However, this would be possible only through the support of members and donors, and local authorities' commitment and co-operation.

To avoid duplication of effort and minimise administrative costs, the Foundation consulted the National Playing Fields Association (NPFA) and its affiliated county organisations. The NPFA would act, as administrator, to look at and consider proposals in order to allocate grants.

The amount of grant to be given rested with the Foundation. Among the factors taken into account by the Grants Committee were the population, number and size of existing playing fields, and local economic conditions. No size or standard of field, or particular facilities, were prescribed. Some very large schemes emerged; the largest King George's Field in Enfield, London, covers approximately 128 acres (0.5 km^{2}), providing many pitches for a variety of games. The smallest King George's Field at less than 1/4 acre is in the City of London, where the most urgent need was to keep children off the roads.

Certain conditions had to be observed. The Foundation, very much aware of the concept of a National Memorial, required security of tenure over the land and its dedication for permanent preservation as a 'King George's Field'. Funds were not made available for schemes that might disappear after a few years. The land had to be developed in some suitable way for playing on; ornamental gardens and parks, for example, were not accepted.

Additionally, each scheme was to have an entrance to the field designed to provide a sufficiently dignified setting for the heraldic panels that distinguish a field as a 'King George's Field'. While no particular style was adopted by the Foundation, it discouraged ornate or expensive entrance gates, and recommended the use of local materials.

=== The impact of the King George's Fields Foundation ===
Between the opening of the grants policy on 1 March 1937 and the outbreak of war in September, 1939, the Foundation approved 462 schemes out of a possible 1,800 preliminary applications. Approximately £400,000 of funds had been allocated as grants to various schemes in towns and villages the length and breadth of the country. However, during the seven years that war raged in Europe, construction work on playing fields was all but at a standstill. After 1945, with changed circumstances and social political issues in need of urgent prioritisation – for example, health, education and housing – many of the original approved schemes were abandoned, though in a number of cases alternative schemes were approved and grant-aided. All schemes were eventually completed in the 1960s.

It took some time before all the "King George's Fields" were completed in every detail. Table 1 shows the final list of the approved schemes under their respective countries. Table 2 summarises land ownership.

Table 1: Summary of King George's Fields
	No. of Schemes	Area	Capital costs £	Grants allocated
England	344	3,210 acres (13 km^{2})	3,433,876	458,407
Scotland	85	723 acres (2.9 km^{2})	379,849	93,495
Wales	35	329 acres (1.3 km^{2})	253,070	53,840
Northern Ireland	7	26 acres (0.1 km^{2})	32,135	11,375
Totals	471	4,288 acres	4,098,930	617,117

Notes:

1. Statistics for England include the Channel Islands.
2. 19 fields are included, which were financed entirely by local bodies, without grant aid from the Foundation. The schemes were recognised as 'King George's Fields' and provided with heraldic panels.
3. The Foundation was not authorised to spend any funds outside the UK but accorded the style "King George's Field" and issued Heraldic Panels to sites in Barbados, the Falkland Islands, Malta, Nigeria and Yemen (then Aden).

Table 2: Distribution of bodies in which the freeholds of the King George's Fields are vested
	Principal local authorities	Parish, town or community councils	Local trustees	NPFA
England	203	105	25	11
Scotland	71	–	14	–
Wales	17	11	6	1
Northern Ireland	5	–	1	1
Totals	296	116	46	13

=== The dissolution of the King George's Fields Foundation ===
The 1960s brought about further change. Almost thirty years had passed since the Foundation came into being and the time had now come to hand over responsibility to the National Playing Fields Association, (now known as Fields in Trust) of which Prince Philip, Duke of Edinburgh was president until succeeded by his grandson Prince William, Duke of Cambridge in 2013. The Foundation was never intended to continue to exist with its own trustees. The NPFA assumed total responsibility as the trustee of the charity, as agreed through a Scheme of the Charity Commissioners on 1 December 1965. Residual funds in the sum of £41,251 were transferred to the NPFA, which was then charged with the responsibility of paying £12,200 of allocated but unspent funds for certain purposes in connection with the approved 'King George's Fields'.

Under the Commissioners' Scheme, responsibilities of the National Playing Fields Association as trustees of the charity were extended to include the "preservation" in addition to "establishment" of the King George's Fields. This means that any plans by a local trustee require the consent of the NPFA, which has the duty of preserving the King George's Fields.

The NPFA was also given powers to use the remainder of the funds available for repairs or renewal of items of a capital nature including the replacement of heraldic panels.

=== Conclusion ===
The King George's Fields were set up in memory of King George V and provided and protected valuable open spaces and facilities, still of great value, for children and young people in particular. They are, in most cases, established on charitable trust and protected 'in perpetuity'. The Foundation's aim in 1936 was to make its funds stretch as far as possible. The total capital value of the 471 'King George's Fields' in 1936 amounted to approximately £4,000,000, measured by total expenditure on acquisition and development of land, undertaken by the local bodies concerned, with the aid of the grants made to them by the Foundation.

== Importance of memorial entrances and maintenance of heraldic panels ==
=== Introduction ===
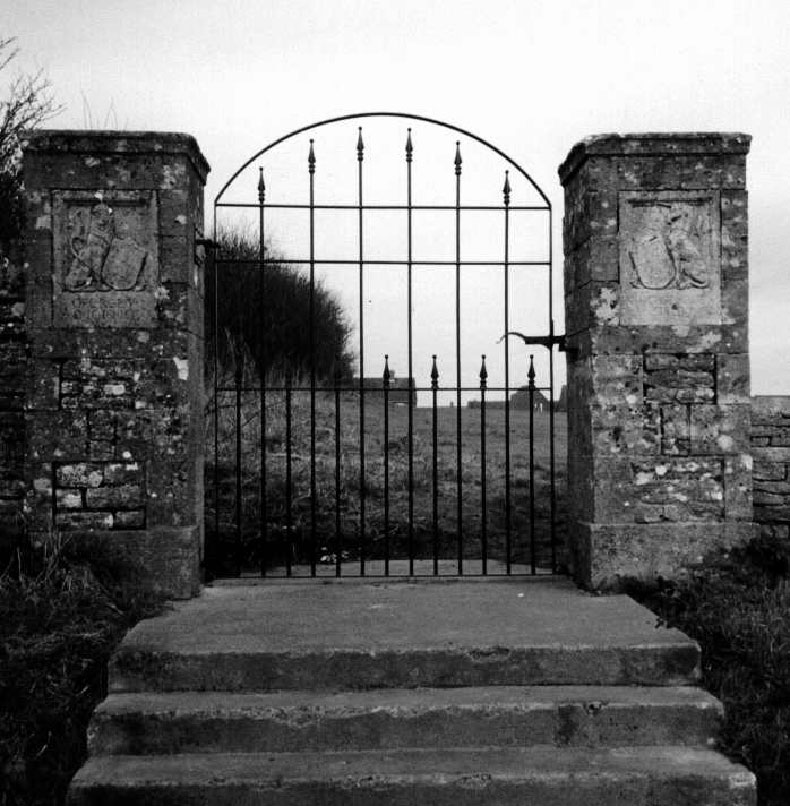
Stone heraldic panels in a King George V Field gateway

As every 'King George's Field' (KGF) forms part of a national memorial to King George V, it was a condition that the land is legally dedicated as such, and that the terms of its tenure should ensure its preservation for public recreation. It was also a condition that for every scheme the foundation's architect should approve the design of the entrance on which the heraldic panels were to be displayed. The governing factor with regard to the design of the entrance was 'appropriateness' – simple designs of character and materials suited to the neighbourhood. The local bodies were encouraged to employ an architect of their own choice, but, where desired, the foundation's architect gave the necessary guidance.

On 3 November 1936, the King George's Fields Foundation (KGFF) was constituted as a charitable trust to give effect to the scheme. The objects of the trust were "to promote and to assist in the establishment of playing fields for the use and enjoyment of the people throughout the United Kingdom of Great Britain and Northern Ireland". All the playing fields were to be styled and called 'King George's Field' and were to be distinguished by heraldic panels of a specific nature.

These heraldic panels were issued as a gift by the foundation to all approved schemes, and became the official emblems of the national memorial.

Although there was no set recommendation on the design of memorial entrances as a suitable tribute, it was agreed that every field should bear a unique insignia associated with George V.

=== Designs to be approved by the Foundation ===
The arrangements between the Foundation and the National Playing Fields Association (NPFA) were as follows:

- Playing fields were to be acquired locally, planned, equipped, maintained and safeguarded for recreational purposes with the help of a Grant-in-aid Policy set up on 1 March 1937.
- All schemes, or proposals for schemes, were submitted in the first instance to the Foundation. Those that became eligible to become a 'King George's Field' were remitted for inspection and report. The Foundation's final approval of each scheme for official recognition as a 'King George's Field' carried with it the provision of heraldic panels, and the grant to be given.

Approval by the NPFAs, as trustee of the Foundation, is still sought for any schemes or proposals for King George's Fields.

The Foundation, in pursuance of its national memorial purpose, had to prescribe certain conditions as to the design of the entrance. Highly ornate and expensive entrances were not encouraged. For many schemes designs were adopted by the local bodies to meet the Foundation's minimum requirements. In this instance, local conditions and local materials were taken into consideration as an essential part of the design.

The width, material and size of entrances were governed by the size of the particular field, and by the size of community most likely to use it. It was suggested that wherever possible the actual gates should be set back from the boundary line of the field next to the road so as to provide a clear space outside for children leaving the field. In cases where a field was unfenced no actual gates would be necessary but piers bearing the heraldic panels might be placed as pylons to mark the most important point of entry.

Consideration also had to be taken into account regarding the type of stone used for the pillars. Particular attention was given to using quality local materials. For instance, stone piers in Bath would have been treated quite differently from those of Derbyshire or Cornwall. In counties where buildings and walls were predominantly built of stone, the piers would be built of the local stone. Where a field had a stone wall enclosing it, it might well be that piers would be unnecessary and that a simple raising of the wall would provide an appropriate setting for the heraldic panels. Brick piers were built of a narrow brick, not machine-pressed brick, and excessive or elaborate mouldings were avoided.

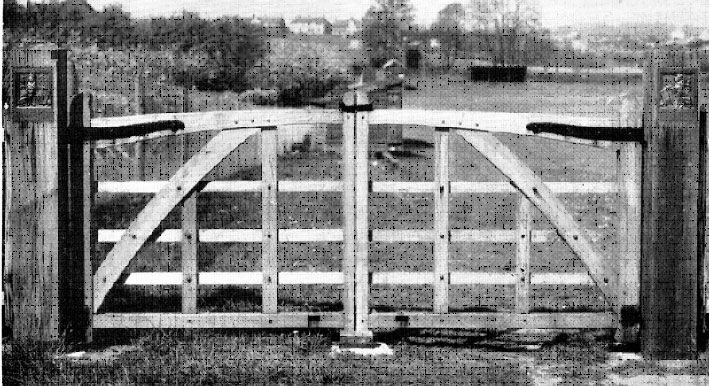
Bronze heraldic panels in a King George V Field gateway

The most suitable field entrance for many villages was a wicket or field gate of English oak properly framed and pinned, hung to oak posts with hinges wrought by the local blacksmith. Where iron gates were more suitable over-elaboration was to be avoided. Designs had to be simple, made of wrought iron, and of such a type as could easily be opened and closed by children. Consideration too had to be given that the gates were strong enough to withstand rough and constant usage. The memorial panels were to be set on the upper portion of each gate pier.

=== The heraldic panels ===
Heraldic panels were made of either stone or bronze and, in some cases, brass. These panels were, and still must be, displayed at the main entrance to the field; the Lion panel to be fixed on the left of the entrance and the Unicorn panel on the right, except Scotland, where the opposite is compulsory. Where the piers of the entrance are of brick or stone, the panels were of stone 2 ft (1 m) high by 1 ft 6 in (0.46 m) broad. Where wooden posts form the gate-supports, smaller plaques in bronze were issued – 11¼ins high by 8¼ins broad.

The panels feature a design by George Kruger Gray. In the case of England, Wales and Northern Ireland, the panel on the left is the Lion, holding a Royal Shield, with the words 'George V' underneath, and below them 'A.D. 1910–1936'; and on the right is the Unicorn holding a similar shield with the words 'King George's Field' underneath. In the case of Scotland, the relative positions of the Lion and the Unicorn are reversed, and the Scottish arms take prior place in the Shield and the Unicorn wears a crown. The wording below is identical.

These panels are essential to the heritage of the Foundation. Subject to the Deed of Dedication, the fields are, in most cases, established on charitable trust and protected in 'perpetuity'. The NPFA gives initial guidance and the necessary information on the specific design.
