= Bristol Cathedral Choir School =

Secondary academy in Bristol, England

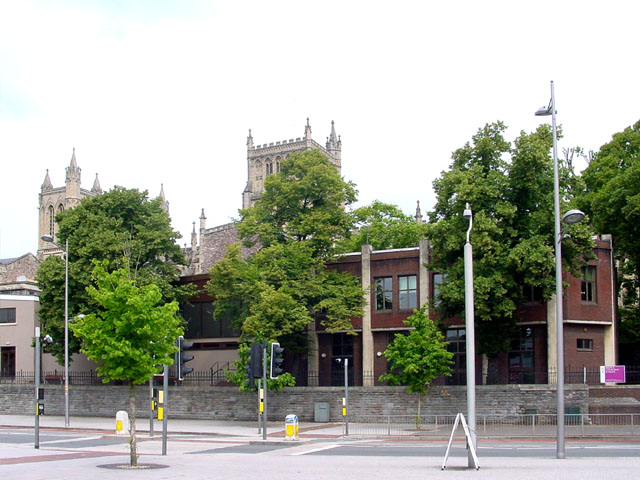

Location
- College Square; Bristol, BS1 5TS; England
- Coordinates: 51.4508°N 2.6029°W

Information
- Former name: Bristol Cathedral School
- Type: Secondary Academy; Cathedral school
- Religious affiliation: Church of England
- Established: 1140; 886 years ago
- Local authority: Bristol City Council
- Oversight: Diocese of Bristol
- Trust: Cathedral Schools Trust
- Department for Education URN: 135575 Tables
- Ofsted: Reports
- Head of school: Wade Nottingham
- Gender: Mixed
- Age: 11 to 18
- Enrolment: 780 (Data from January 2016)
- Capacity: 680 (Data from January 2016)
- Houses: Abbots; Canons; Deans; Priors; Bishops
- Accreditations: National Teaching School, Artsmark
- Website: bccs.bristol.sch.uk

Bristol Cathedral Choir School is a mixed gender non-selective musical secondary school with academy status, in the Cabot area of Bristol, England. Until 2008 it was Bristol Cathedral School, part of Bristol Cathedral, in the centre of the city. The choristers of the cathedral are educated at the school, which has a strong musical tradition. The school is a day school and has no boarders. It admits some pupils each year based on musical aptitude, as well as admitting probationary choristers. That is the school's only form of selection, and all other pupils are chosen at random via a lottery system.

== History ==
Founded in 1140 as part of what was then Bristol Abbey, Bristol Cathedral School was re-founded by Henry VIII in 1542 after he dissolved the monastery.

A fee-paying school up until the Second World War, from 1944 to 1975 it was a direct grant school. When direct grant schools were abolished, it had to become an independent school once more to maintain its policy of selection by academic ability.

The school began accepting girls into the sixth form in 1982 and became fully co-educational in 2005.

In April 2007 the school appointed a new headmaster, Hugh Monro. In July of that year, the school moved towards ending a 30-year period as an independent, fee-paying institution by applying to change its status to a publicly funded city academy with specialities in music and maths – the first choir school in the country to make such a move. The formal agreement clearing the way for the school to become an academy in September 2008 was signed on 3 March 2008. At the same time, the school's name was changed to Bristol Cathedral Choir School.

== External facilities ==
Weekly assemblies, occasional services and school concerts are held in Bristol Cathedral.

The school has playing fields near Beggar Bush Lane in Failand.

== Buildings ==
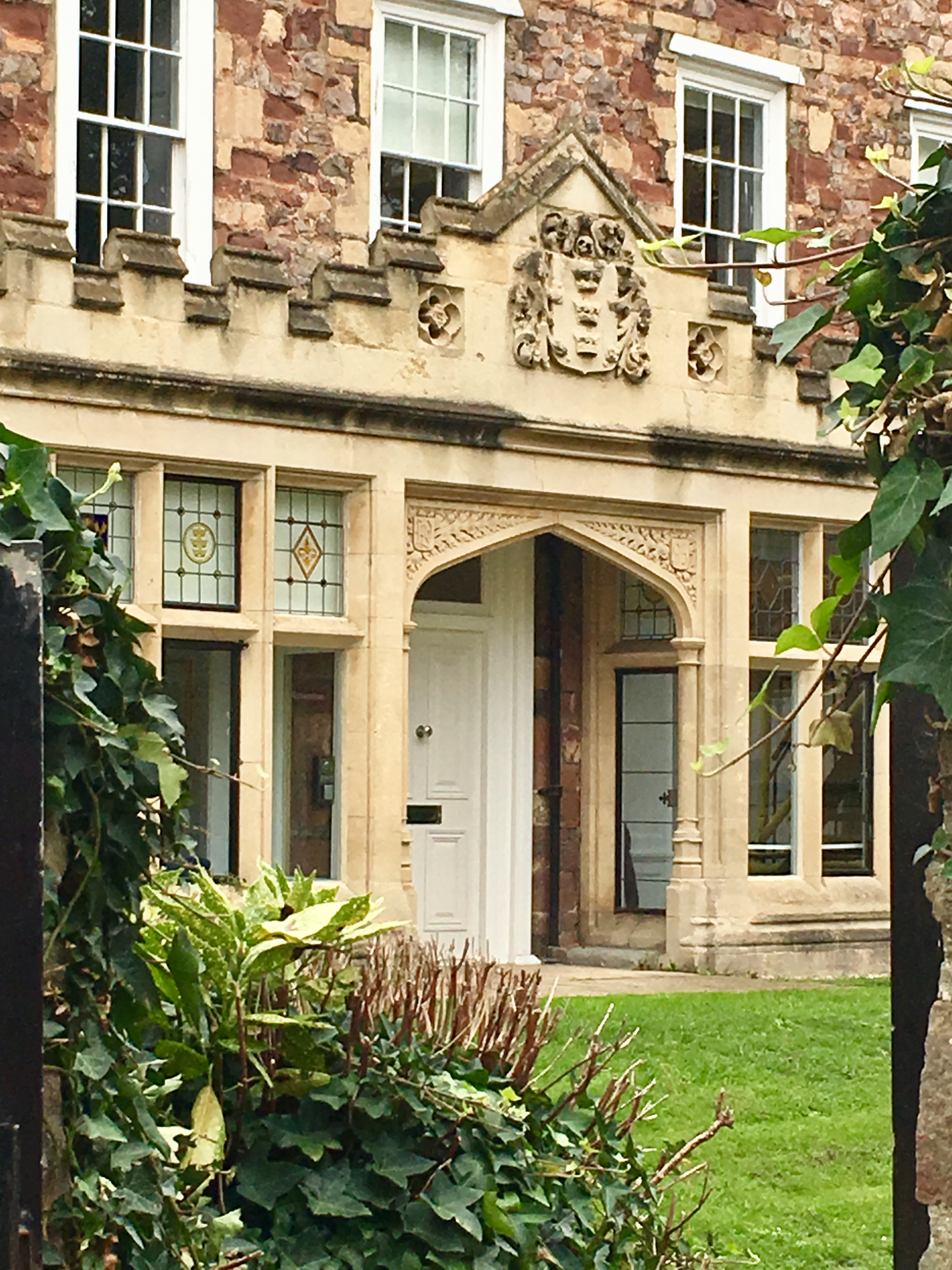
Deanery entrance, no longer used

The main school building was part of St Augustine's Abbey, which was founded in 1140. This contains the refectory and a 13th-century right-hand archway, with upper walls from the early 16th century. It was extensively altered and partly refaced in the late 18th and early 19th centuries. It has been designated by English Heritage as a Grade II* listed building. The Abbey House and Deanery are also Grade II* listed.

Following its conversion to academy status, several new buildings were added to the school on the west side of College Square. In 2008 the Rectory building was completed at a cost of £3.5 million. This was followed by the Parsonage and then the Cresswell Centre, which was opened by Lord Adonis in September 2011.

In 2013, Cathedral Primary School – also managed by Cathedral Schools Trust – opened under the city library,

== Uganda link ==
Since 1987, the school has been linked with St. James's School, an independent co-educational secondary school in the centre of Jinja, Uganda. Each year a teacher from St. James's visits Bristol for two or three weeks, getting involved in school activities including expeditions, observing lessons and also giving lessons on topics such as AIDS, agriculture or African economics. In addition, two gap-year students from Bristol go to Jinja for six months each year. They act as classroom assistants at St. James's, as well as helping in a local primary school and in an orphanage or a street children's centre.

== Cathedral Schools Trust ==
Since 2008 the school has been managed by the Cathedral Schools Trust, a multi-academy trust with roots in the Church of England in Bristol. The trust also manages two other secondary schools, Trinity Academy in Lockleaze and St. Katherine's School in Pill, and six primary schools: Cathedral, Headley Park, Hotwells, St Werburgh's, Stoke Park and Victoria Park.

== Notable Old Cathedralians ==
- Sophie Anderton (born 1977), lingerie model and reality television personality
- James Averis (born 1974), cricketer
- Raymond L. Brett (1917–1996), professor of English at University of Hull and a friend of Philip Larkin
- Chris Chivers (1967-), Anglican priest
- Russ Conway (1925–2000), pianist and composer
- Reginald Croom-Johnson (1879–1957), an English barrister and judge who also served as a Conservative Member of Parliament
- William Draper (1721–1787), British Army officer and cricketeer who led the expedition which captured Manila in 1762
- John Fortune (1939–2013), comic and writer
- Tom Dascombe (Born 1973), jockey and racehorse trainer
- Racey Helps, (1913–1970), children's writer and illustrator
- David Hulin, (born 1975), director and animation director
- Andrew Ibrahim (born 1989), terrorist suspect convicted of preparing terrorist acts
- Dan Jones (born 1969), composer
- David Jones (1941–2010), Flavelle Medal–winning biologist
- Chris McNab (born 1980), author and computer hacker
- Mark Newman (born c.1967), physicist
- Tom Spilsbury (born 1976), journalist, Doctor Who Magazine editor
- Tony Whitby (1930-1975), British BBC Radio producer; controller of BBC radio 4 from 1970 to 1975
- Alured Wilshere (1872-1957), barrister, academic and legal scholar.
- Reece Winstone (1909–1991), photographer and local historian
- Alan Geoffrey Woods (born 1942), Dean of Gibraltar 2003–2008

It has been said that the influential pseudonymous graffiti artist Banksy, whose identity is a closely guarded secret, is a former pupil of Bristol Cathedral School named Robin Gunningham.

== Former teachers ==
- David Jewell, headmaster
- Alastair Hignell, history and sport

== See also ==
- List of the oldest schools in the United Kingdom
- List of the oldest schools in the world
