= Iain MacLean =

Ian or Iain MacLean or McLean may refer to:

== Sportsmen ==
- Ian McLean (footballer) (1929–1965), Australian rules footballer
- Ian McLean (cricketer) (born 1954), Australian cricketer
- Iain MacLean (basketball) (born 1965), Scottish former basketball player and coach
- Ian MacLean (born 1966), Scottish former footballer
- Iain McLean (born 1983), Scottish lawn bowler

== Others ==
- Ian McLean (politician) (born 1934), New Zealand National Party MP
- Ian McLean (actor) (1887–1978), English stage and film actor
- Ian McLean (judge) (1928 – 2016)
- Iain MacLean (politician) (1953–2008), Australian Liberal Party legislator
- Iain MacLean (journalist), Scottish TV news presenter since 2001
