= Trinity Academy, Bristol =

Trinity Academy

Location
- Brangwyn Grove; Bristol, BS7 9BY; England; 51.4873°N 2.5652°W

Information
- Type: Secondary Academy
- Established: 2019; 7 years ago
- Local authority: Bristol City Council
- Oversight: Diocese of Bristol
- Trust: Amplify Education
- Department for Education URN: 147072 Tables
- Ofsted: Reports
- Head of school: Eiron Bailey
- Gender: Mixed
- Age: 11 to 18
- Capacity: 1220
- Website: trinityacademybristol.org

Trinity Academy is a mixed gender non-selective musical Secondary Academy, located in the Lockleaze area of Bristol, England. It is one of three secondary schools in the Cathedrals Schools Trust (CST) along with Bristol Cathedral Choir School and St Katherine's School. It is situated alongside Stoke Park Primary School.

== History ==
In March 2018 Cathedral Schools Trust and Bristol City Council secured £25 million in funding from the Education & Skills Funding Agency, to fund the building of the new school. Trinity Academy opened to students in September 2019 using temporary buildings. It first moved into its new building in September 2021, and expects to reach its capacity of 1,220 pupils in September 2025.

In 2023, the Schools Adjudicator ruled that a change to the Trinity Academy admission criteria must be reversed, so that the allocation of places to its "inner priority area" returns to 25%, rather than an ambiguous change to "up to 25 per cent".

== See also ==
- Bristol Cathedral Choir School
