= Alured Myddleton Wilshere =

English barrister and legal scholar (1891–1972)

A. M. Wilshere
- Born: 27 February 1872; Corhampton, England
- Died: 12 November 1957 (aged 86)
- Education: Hertford College, Oxford
- Occupation: Barrister
- Notable work: Harris and Wilshire's Criminal Law

Alured Nathaniel Myddleton Wilshere (sometimes misspelt Wilshire) (27 February 1872 - 12 November 1957) was an English barrister, academic and legal scholar. He was a writer of legal texts, most notably Harris and Wilshere's Criminal Law which was a leading textbook on English criminal law.

== Early life and education ==
Wilshere was born on 27 February 1872 in Corhampton, Hampshire in England, the son of Ebenezer Stibbs, a clergyman.

He was schooled at Bristol Cathedral School and Bristol Grammar School and is then reported to have traveled to Canada. On his return to England, he was elected a scholar at Hertford College, Oxford, matriculating on 14 October 1890. He was awarded a second class in Classical Moderations as a non-collegiate student in 1892.

Wilshere later joined Gray’s Inn as a student of law and he took the LL.B. degree at the University of London, where he gained distinction as Exhibitioner in Roman Law and Jurisprudence. He was called to the bar on 17 November 1902 having been awarded the First Certificate of Honour by the Council of Legal Education during the Michaelmas term of that year.

== Career ==
Wilshere was a member of the Western Circuit practicing from 2 Elm Court Chambers in the Temple, London, before the sessions at Hampshire, Winchester, Southampton, Portsmouth, Bournemouth and Bristol, and before the Central Criminal Court.

Early on in his career, he lectured in Common Law for the Bristol and District Board of Legal Studies, which prepared students for professional qualifying examinations. By 1911, he was styled “Special Lecturer in Law to the University of Bristol”.

Wilshere wrote a number of standard student texts for Sweet & Maxwell, including:

- The Elements of Criminal Law and Procedure (1906; 2nd ed. 1911)
- A Selection of Leading Cases Illustrating the Criminal Law (1912)
- The Outlines of Procedure in an Action in the King’s Bench Division (2nd ed. 1913)

He also edited and revised the 13th through 18th editions (1919 to 1950) of Seymour Harris’s Principles of the Criminal Law, leading to the work commonly being cited as “Harris and Wilshere.”

== Death ==
Wilshere died in Bristol on 12 November 1957. An obituary in the Cathedral School magazine described him as one of Bristol’s leading barristers and noted the international reputation of his legal writings.
