= Frederic Philip Tomlinson =

English barrister and legal scholar (1846–1883)

- Born: 10 July 1846; Heysham, Lancashire
- Died: 31 August 1883 (aged 37); Mouswald, Dumfriesshire
- Education: Trinity College, Cambridge
- Occupation: Barrister
- Notable work: Harris's Criminal Law

Frederic Philip Tomlinson (10 July 1846 - 31 August 1883) was an English barrister and legal scholar. He was co-editor of Harris's Principles of the Criminal Law, which was a leading textbook on English criminal law.

== Early life and education ==
Tomlinson was born on 10 July 1846 at Heysham, Lancashire, the fifth son of Thomas Tomlinson, a barrister, and Sarah Mashiter, daughter of the Rev. Roger Mashiter of Bolton-le-Sands. His brother was William Tomlinson.

He was schooled at Westminster School and was admitted to Trinity College, Cambridge as a pensioner in 1864, later becoming a scholar in 1867, and taking the B.A. in 1868 (proceeded by seniority to the M.A. in 1872).

He was admitted at the Inner Temple in 1867 and called to the Bar in the Michelmas term of 1871.

== Career ==
Tomlinson practised as a special pleader and circuit junior on the Northern Circuit, and he held chambers in the Temple, London.

In 1881, he co-wrote the second edition of Principles of the Criminal Law with Seymour F. Harris, and he wrote The Judicature Acts and Rules of the Supreme Court, 1883: With Notes and Index, which was published posthumously in 1884.

== Personal life and death ==
On 29 July 1876, Tomlinson married Mary Reid, eldest daughter of Sir James John Reid, a Scottish advocate and former colonial Chief Justice of the Ionian Islands.

He died after a short illness on 31 August 1883 at Mouswald, Dumfriesshire, aged 37.
