= Regional 1 South West =

Level five rugby union league in England

- Current season or competition: 2025–26 Regional 1 South West
- Sport: Rugby union
- Instituted: 1987; 39 years ago (as South West 1)
- Number of teams: 12
- Country: England
- Holders: Devonport Services (2nd title) (2025–26 (promoted to National League 2 West))
- Most titles: Barnstaple, Bournemouth, Chinnor, Clifton, Devonport Services, Dings Crusaders, Reading (2 titles)
- Website: England Rugby – South West Division

Regional 1 South West (formerly South West Premier and National League 3 South West) is a level five league in the English rugby union system. It is one of six leagues at this level. When this division began in 1987 it was known as South West Division 1. The format of the league was changed at the beginning of the 2009–10 season following reorganisation by the Rugby Football Union, and the name change from National League 3 to South West Premier was introduced for the 2017–18 season by the RFU in order to lessen confusion for what is a series of regional leagues. Regional 1 South West, is the highest regional rugby union league covering South West England. The club finishing in first place is promoted to National League 2 West. Relegated teams drop down to either Regional 2 South West or Regional 2 Severn, depending on their location.

Devonport Services are the 2025-26 champions and will be promoted to National League 2 West.

== Format ==
The season runs from September to April and comprises twenty-two rounds of matches, with each club playing each of its rivals, home and away. The results of the matches contribute points to the league as follows:

- 4 points are awarded for a win
- 2 points are awarded for a draw
- 0 points are awarded for a loss, however
- 1 losing (bonus) point is awarded to a team that loses a match by 7 points or fewer
- 1 additional (bonus) point is awarded to a team scoring 4 tries or more in a match

== 2026–27 ==
Departing were Devonport Services, promoted to National League 2 West while Marlborough (11th) and Matson (12th) were relegated to Regional 2 Severn.

=== Participating teams and locations ===
Team	Ground	Capacity	City/Area	Previous season
Brixham	Astley Park	1,800 (300 stand)	Brixham, Devon	3rd
Chew Valley	Lobbingtons		Chew Magna, Somerset	10th
Exmouth	Imperial Recreation Ground	1,250 (250 stand)	Exmouth, Devon	4th
Launceston	Polson Bridge	3,000 (194 seats)	Launceston, Cornwall	8th
Lydney	Regentsholme	3,000 (340 seats)	Lydney, Gloucestershire	7th
Newent	Recreation Ground		Newent, Gloucestershire	Level transfer from Regional 1 Midlands (4th)
Royal Wootton Bassett	Ballards Ash		Royal Wootton Bassett, Wiltshire	6th
Sidmouth	Blackmore Field		Sidmouth, Devon	9th
St Austell	Tregorrick Park	4,000 (300 seats)	St Austell, Cornwall	5th
Topsham	Bonfire Field		Topsham, Exeter	Runners-up
Trowbridge	Doric Park		Hilperton, Trowbridge, Wiltshire	Promoted from Regional 2 Severn (Champions)
Weston-super-Mare	Recreation Ground	6,000	Weston-super-Mare, Somerset	Promoted from Regional 2 South West (Champions)

Locations of the 2026–27 Regional 1 South West teams

== 2025–26 ==
Ten of last years teams participated in this season's competition, with the league made up of five teams from Devon, two each from Cornwall, Gloucestershire and Wiltshire, and one from Somerset. Departing were Barnstaple, promoted to National League 2 West with Devonport Services (12th) replacing them. Ivybridge (12th) were relegated to Regional 2 South West and Topsham, as champions, were promoted from that league.

=== Participating teams and locations ===
Team	Ground	Capacity	City/Area	Previous season
Brixham	Astley Park	1,800 (300 stand)	Brixham, Devon	2nd
Chew Valley	Lobbingtons		Chew Magna, Somerset	11th
Devonport Services	The Rectory Field	2,000	Devonport, Plymouth, Devon	Relegated from National League 2 West (12th)
Exmouth	Imperial Recreation Ground	1,250 (250 stand)	Exmouth, Devon	3rd
Launceston	Polson Bridge	3,000 (194 seats)	Launceston, Cornwall	5th
Lydney	Regentsholme	3,000 (340 seats)	Lydney, Gloucestershire	9th
Marlborough	The Common		Marlborough, Wiltshire	10th
Matson	Redwell Road		Matson, Gloucester	7th
Royal Wootton Bassett	Ballards Ash		Royal Wootton Bassett, Wiltshire	8th
Sidmouth	Blackmore Field		Sidmouth, Devon	6th
St Austell	Tregorrick Park	4,000 (300 seats)	St Austell, Cornwall	4th
Topsham	Bonfire Field		Topsham, Exeter	Promoted from Regional 2 South West (champions)

Locations of the 2025−26 Regional 1 South West teams

=== League table ===
Regional 1 South West 2025–26
Pos	Team	Pld	W	D	L	PF	PA	PD	TB	LB	Pts	Qualification
1	Devonport Services (P)	22	18	1	3	818	504	+314	18	2	94	Promoted
2	Topsham	22	16	2	4	713	501	+212	16	2	86	Promotion play-off
3	Brixham	22	15	0	7	808	515	+293	17	4	81	Promotion play-off
4	Exmouth	22	12	1	9	711	466	+245	17	4	71	
5	St Austell	22	14	1	7	599	458	+141	9	3	70	
6	Royal Wootton Bassett (Note: The current table on the RFU site (11 April) gives RWB 62 points)	22	11	2	9	689	641	+48	10	3	61	
7	Lydney	22	11	2	9	523	473	+50	10	3	61	
8	Launceston	22	8	0	14	520	583	−63	10	8	50	
9	Sidmouth	22	8	0	14	550	705	−155	13	5	50	Relegation play-off
10	Chew Valley	22	7	0	15	474	741	−267	7	4	39	Relegation play-off
11	Marlborough (R)	22	3	1	18	420	894	−474	7	3	24	Relegation place
12	Matson (R)	22	4	0	18	341	685	−344	4	2	22	Relegation place

Updated to match(es) played on 10 May 2026. Source:
Rules for classification: If teams are level at any stage, tiebreakers are applied in the following order:
1. Number of matches won
2. Difference between points for and against
3. Total number of points for
4. Aggregate number of points scored in matches between tied teams
5. Number of matches won excluding the first match, then the second and so on until the tie is settled

=== Play-offs ===
The champions, Devonport Services, are automatically promoted to next seasons National 2 West. Second-placed Topsham won the Regional 1 South West play-off against third-placed Brixham, while Stourbridge beat Newport in the Regional 1 Midlands play-off. Stourbridge beat Topsham in Round 2 and played Exeter University for the right to play in next seasons National 2 West. Exeter University remain in National League 2 West. In each match the highest placed team play at home.

Promotion play-offs

25 April 2026
14:00

Topsham (2nd)	43 – 24	Brixham (3rd)

Bonfield Field, Topsham

25 April 2026

Newport (Salop) (2nd)	26 – 36	Stourbridge (3rd)

The Old Showground, Stourbridge

Round 2

2 May 2026

Topsham	12 – 24	Stourbridge

Bonfield Field, Topsham

NLR Accession Final

9 May 2026
15:00

Exeter University (12th)	64 – 10	Stourbridge

Topsham Sports Ground, Exeter

Relegation play-off

The 9th and 10th placed teams held a play-off, with the losing team playing in the Regional 1 Accession Final, against the winner of the Regional 2 Severn promotion play-off. Both Sidmouth and Chew Valley remain in Regional 1 South West.

25 April 2026
14:30

Sidmouth (9th)	44 – 41	Chew Valley (10th)

Blackmore Field, Sidmouth

Regional 1 Accession Final

9 May 2026

Chew Valley	42 – 31	Chippenham

Lobbingtons, Chew Magna

== 2024–25 ==
Nine of last years teams participate in this season's competition. Five of the teams are from Devon, while Cornwall, Gloucestershire and Wiltshire have two clubs each and Somerset one club. Devonport Services, as champions, are promoted to National League 2 West. Okehampton (11th) and Weston-super-Mare (12th) are relegated to Regional 2 South West and Regional 2 Severn respectively, while Marlborough (9th) is transferred from Regional 1 South Central.

=== Participating teams and locations ===
Team	Ground	Capacity	City/Area	Previous season
Barnstaple	Pottingham Road	2,000 (575 seats)	Barnstaple, Devon	2nd
Brixham	Astley Park	1,800 (300 stand)	Brixham, Devon	4th
Chew Valley	Lobbingtons		Chew Magna, Somerset	3rd
Exmouth	Imperial Recreation Ground	1,250 (250 stand)	Exmouth, Devon	6th
Ivybridge	Cross-in-Hand		Ivybridge, Devon	9th
Launceston	Polson Bridge	3,000 (194 seats)	Launceston, Cornwall	5th
Lydney	Regentsholme	3,000 (340 seats)	Lydney, Gloucestershire	7th
Marlborough	The Common		Marlborough, Wiltshire	Transferred from Regional 1 SC (9th)
Matson	Redwell Road		Matson, Gloucester	10th
Royal Wootton Bassett	Ballards Ash		Royal Wootton Bassett, Wiltshire	Promoted from Regional 2 Severn (1st)
Sidmouth	Blackmore Field		Sidmouth, Devon	Promoted from Regional 2 SW (1st)
St Austell	Tregorrick Park	4,000 (300 seats)	St Austell, Cornwall	8th

Locations of the 2024–25 Regional 1 South West teams

=== League table ===
Regional 1 South West 2024–25
Pos	Team	Pld	W	D	L	PF	PA	PD	TB	LB	Pts	Qualification
1	Barnstaple (C)	22	18	1	3	855	367	+488	19	2	95	Promoted
2	Brixham	22	18	1	3	855	497	+358	16	3	93	
3	Exmouth	22	16	0	6	886	516	+370	19	5	88	
4	St Austell	22	12	0	10	593	579	+14	12	3	63	
5	Launceston	22	11	0	11	666	733	−67	14	1	59	
6	Sidmouth	22	10	0	12	576	626	−50	14	4	58	
7	Matson	22	10	0	12	536	629	−93	12	3	55	
8	Royal Wootton Bassett	22	10	0	12	601	608	−7	9	5	54	
9	Lydney	22	8	1	13	593	586	+7	10	4	48	
10	Marlborough	22	6	1	15	591	737	−146	11	2	39	
11	Chew Valley	22	7	0	15	541	768	−227	7	3	38	
12	Ivybridge (R)	22	4	0	18	437	1084	−647	7	1	24	Relegated

Updated to match(es) played on 8 April 2025. Source:
Rules for classification: If teams are level at any stage, tiebreakers are applied in the following order:
1. Number of matches won
2. Difference between points for and against
3. Total number of points for
4. Aggregate number of points scored in matches between tied teams
5. Number of matches won excluding the first match, then the second and so on until the tie is settled
  (C) Champion; (R) Relegated

== 2023–24 ==
Nine of last years teams participate in this season's competition. Champions, Camborne were promoted to National League 2 West while Old Centralians (11th) and Drybrook (12th) were both relegated to Regional 2 Severn. Six of the teams are from Devon, while Cornwall, Gloucestershire and Somerset each have two clubs.

=== Participating teams and locations ===
Team	Ground	Capacity	City/Area	Previous season
Barnstaple	Pottingham Road	2,000 (575 seats)	Barnstaple, Devon	Relegated from National League 2 West 13th
Brixham	Astley Park	1,800 (300 stand)	Brixham, Devon	3rd
Chew Valley	Lobbingtons		Chew Magna, Somerset	2nd
Devonport Services	The Rectory	2,000	Devonport, Plymouth, Devon	4th
Exmouth	Imperial Recreation Ground	1,250 (250 stand)	Exmouth, Devon	5th
Ivybridge	Cross-in-Hand		Ivybridge, Devon	6th
Launceston	Polson Bridge	3,000 (194 seats)	Launceston, Cornwall	8th
Lydney	Regentsholme	3,000 (340 seats)	Lydney, Gloucestershire	7th
Matson	Redwell Road		Matson, Gloucester, Gloucestershire	Promoted from Regional 2 Severn (1st)
Okehampton	Showground	1,120 (120 seats)	Okehampton, Devon	9th
St Austell	Tregorrick Park	4,000 (300 seats)	St Austell, Cornwall	Promoted from Regional 2 South West (1st)
Weston-super-Mare	Recreation Ground	3,000	Weston-super-Mare, Somerset	10th

Locations of the 2023–24 Regional 1 South West teams

=== League table ===
Regional 1 South West 2023–24
Pos	Team	Pld	W	D	L	PF	PA	PD	TB	LB	Pts	Qualification
1	Devonport Services (C)	22	19	0	3	793	403	+390	16	2	94	Promoted
2	Barnstaple	22	18	0	4	727	341	+386	14	2	88	
3	Chew Valley	22	17	0	5	787	426	+361	14	2	84	
4	Brixham	22	15	1	6	840	554	+286	16	2	80	
5	Launceston	22	13	0	9	616	457	+159	11	3	66	
6	Exmouth	22	11	0	11	517	522	−5	8	2	54	
7	Lydney	22	8	0	14	567	642	−75	14	4	50	
8	St Austell	22	7	1	14	485	643	−158	9	6	45	
9	Ivybridge	22	7	0	15	505	786	−281	6	4	38	
10	Matson	22	7	0	15	432	653	−221	9	3	35 (Note: 5 points deducted)	
11	Okehampton (R)	22	5	0	17	414	797	−383	3	3	26	Relegated
12	Weston-super-Mare (R)	22	4	0	18	441	900	−459	6	2	24	Relegated

Updated to match(es) played on 6 April 2024. Source:
Rules for classification: If teams are level at any stage, tiebreakers are applied in the following order:
1. Number of matches won
2. Difference between points for and against
3. Total number of points for
4. Aggregate number of points scored in matches between tied teams
5. Number of matches won excluding the first match, then the second and so on until the tie is settled
  (C) Champion; (R) Relegated
  Notes:

=== Results ===
Home \ Away	BAR	BRI	CHV	DEV	EXM	IVY	LAU	LYD	MAT	OKE	SAU	WSM
Barnstaple	—	33–20	20–19	41–16	21–17	55–7	26–8	29–10	55–0	45–14	31–17	57–14
Brixham	39–38	—	39–36	28–24	22–45	40–12	46–31	45–20	77–7	88–12	34–34	54–28
Chew Valley	35–19	32–27	—	12–11	21–10	60–31	12–3	36–7	41–0	80–6	44–12	61–6
Devonport Services	23–12	39–22	27–17	—	33–17	61–12	28–18	38–18	39–31	48–7	50–24	55–7
Exmouth	3–26	34–21	27–47	17–20	—	60–14	12–23	40–36	HWO	33–3	27–22	43–18
Ivybridge	16–68	25–42	46–19	17–25	20–11	—	10–24	23–20	18–24	37–23	36–35	29–27
Launceston	20–17	21–28	31–22	6–26	44–5	48–31	—	36–26	46–3	15–20	39–19	62–12
Lydney	10–18	32–29	24–42	20–24	22–31	34–32	38–15	—	44–28	38–19	33–24	34–19
Matson	25–34	10–21	12–17	34–42	31–32	17–14	20–35	27–14	—	29–21	26–20	38–12
Okehampton	8–45	15–41	19–56	19–35	21–22	34–30	30–29	36–10	14–38	—	16–17	12–24
St Austell	8–15	14–19	26–35	5–60	19–3	19–20	19–34	26–24	24–18	27–24	—	41–24
Weston-super-Mare	12–22	12–58	23–43	19–69	38–28	40–25	7–28	25–53	33–14	10–41	31–33	—

Updated to match(es) played on 6 April 2024. Source: Regional 1 South West
Legend: Blue = home team win; Yellow = draw; Red = away team win.
For upcoming matches, an "a" indicates there is an article about the rivalry between the two participants.

== 2022–23 ==
This was the first season following the RFU Adult Competition Review.

Nine of the teams who competed in the final season of the SW Premier competition returned. Departing were Exeter University (champions), Hornets (runners-up) and Old Redcliffians (3rd) were promoted to National League 2 West whilst Bournemouth (8th) and Royal Wootton Bassett (13th) were level transferred to Regional 1 South Central.

with five teams leaving and three joining the league was reduced in size from 14 clubs to 12.

=== Participating teams and locations ===
Team	Ground	Capacity	City/Area	Previous season
Brixham	Astley Park	1,800 (300 stand)	Brixham, Devon	7th
Camborne	Recreation Ground	7,000 (780 seats)	Camborne, Cornwall	11th
Chew Valley	Lobbingtons		Chew Magna, Somerset	Promoted from South West 1 West (champions)
Devonport Services	The Rectory	2,000	Devonport, Plymouth, Devon	Promoted from South West 1 West (runner-up)
Drybrook	Mannings Ground		Drybrook, Gloucestershire	10th
Exmouth	Imperial Recreation Ground	1,250 (250 stand)	Exmouth, Devon	5th
Ivybridge	Cross-in-Hand		Ivybridge, Devon	9th
Launceston	Polson Bridge	3,000 (194 seats)	Launceston, Cornwall	6th
Lydney	Regentsholme	3,000 (340 seats)	Lydney, Gloucestershire	Promoted from South West 1 West (3rd)
Okehampton	Showground	1,120 (120 seats)	Okehampton, Devon	14th
Old Centralians	Saintbridge Sports Centre		Gloucester, Gloucestershire	12th
Weston-super-Mare	Recreation Ground	3,000	Weston-super-Mare, Somerset	4th

Locations of the 2022–23 Regional 1 South West teams

=== Final league table ===
Regional 1 South West 2022–23
Pos	Team	Pld	W	D	L	PF	PA	PD	TB	LB	Pts	Qualification
1	Camborne (P)	22	18	0	4	815	474	+341	20	3	95	Promoted
2	Chew Valley	22	16	0	6	755	459	+296	16	3	83	
3	Brixham	22	14	0	8	629	572	+57	12	3	71	
4	Devonport Services	22	13	0	9	507	516	−9	5	4	61	
5	Exmouth	22	12	0	10	592	504	+88	7	4	59	
6	Ivybridge	22	10	0	12	582	645	−63	11	5	56	
7	Lydney	22	10	0	12	507	544	−37	6	6	52	
8	Launceston	22	10	0	12	494	538	−44	6	6	52	
9	Okehampton	22	10	0	12	445	567	−122	6	2	48	
10	Weston-super-Mare RFC	22	8	0	14	491	661	−170	6	5	43	
11	Old Centralians (R)	22	6	0	16	420	604	−184	5	7	36	Relegated
12	Drybrook (R)	22	5	0	17	414	567	−153	4	7	31	Relegated

Updated to match(es) played on 26 March 2023. Source:
Rules for classification: If teams are level at any stage, tiebreakers are applied in the following order:
1. Number of matches won
2. Difference between points for and against
3. Total number of points for
4. Aggregate number of points scored in matches between tied teams
5. Number of matches won excluding the first match, then the second and so on until the tie is settled
  (P) Promoted; (R) Relegated

=== Results ===
Home \ Away	BRI	CAM	CHV	DEV	DRY	EXM	IVY	LAU	LYD	OKE	OCE	WSM
Brixham	—	38–42	43–27	52–13	57–18	16–14	29–15	36–11	20–15	32–14	8–14	22–26
Camborne	33–35	—	38–28	32–19	38–0	44–24	78–18	39–7	42–25	20–26	67–12	37–21
Chew Valley	51–21	18–14	—	34–32	41–26	25–29	48–27	40–9	26–8	41–22	69–19	51–10
Devonport Services	37–18	27–35	16–10	—	19–13	18–15	41–29	25–24	24–17	20–24	17–16	24–22
Drybrook	43–0	10–31	28–33	20–31	—	22–35	12–16	12–29	9–12	36–14	18–16	21–20
Exmouth	25–45	30–39	20–15	35–23	27–10	—	25–18	22–12	17–15	31–17	67–11	68–14
Ivybridge	24–25	26–29	29–30	18–13	37–26	15–13	—	31–30	34–39	42–18	29–18	45–27
Launceston	17–18	20–39	30–14	18–13	33–20	29–24	44–27	—	22–28	17–38	36–22	14–5
Lydney	50–33	43–35	15–53	13–18	13–10	41–23	22–10	22–27	—	57–33	20–14	17–27
Okehampton	27–7	15–17	0–27	7–21	21–17	17–21	41–25	25–24	22–8	—	19–17	28–24
Old Centralians	27–29	10–40	10–27	28–15	20–22	30–13	13–25	10–15	26–10	41–7	—	34–23
Weston-super-Mare	29–44	22–26	13–47	36–41	24–21	27–14	24–42	28–26	19–17	22–10	28–12	—

Updated to match(es) played on 25 March 2023. Source: Regional 1 South West
Legend: Blue = home team win; Yellow = draw; Red = away team win.
For upcoming matches, an "a" indicates there is an article about the rivalry between the two participants.

== 2021–22 ==
The first matches were played on 4 September 2021 and the final league matches on 23 April 2022. Exeter University (as champions), Old Redcliffians (as runner-up) and Hornets (3rd) are all promoted to National League 2 West (formerly National League 2 South). The RFU will announce the format of the tier 5 leagues during the summer of 2022.

=== Participating teams ===
Nine of the fourteen teams participated in the previous competition (2019–20). The champions, Barnstaple were promoted to National League 2 South, while Newbury and Bracknell were both relegated to South West 1 East. Maidenhead have been level transferred to London & South East Premier. The teams coming into this season's competition are Old Redcliffians and Bournemouth, both relegated from National League 2 South in 15th and 16th position respectively. Teams promoted into this season's competition are Hornets, champions of South West 1 West, and two teams from South West 1 East, Royal Wootton Bassett and Old Centralians (1st and 2nd respectively).

Team	Ground	Capacity	City/Area	Previous season
Bournemouth	Chapel Gate	1,500	Bournemouth, Dorset	Relegated from National League 2 South
Brixham	Astley Park	1,800 (300 stand)	Brixham, Devon	5th
Camborne	Recreation Ground	7,000 (780 seats)	Camborne, Cornwall	9th
Drybrook	Mannings Ground		Drybrook, Gloucestershire	7th
Exeter University	Topsham Sports Ground		Exeter, Devon	6th
Exmouth	Imperial Recreation Ground	1,250 (250 stand)	Exmouth, Devon	10th
Hornets	Hutton Moor Park	1,100 (100 stand)	Weston-super-Mare, Somerset	Promoted from South West 1 West (champions)
Ivybridge	Cross-in-Hand		Ivybridge, Devon	8th
Launceston	Polson Bridge	3,000 (194 seats)	Launceston, Cornwall	11th
Okehampton	Showground	1,120 (120 seats)	Okehampton, Devon	4th
Old Centralians	Saintbridge Sports Centre		Gloucester, Gloucestershire	Promoted from South West 1 East (runner-up)
Old Redcliffians	Scotland Lane	1,000	Brislington, Bristol	Relegated from National League 2 South
Royal Wootton Bassett	Ballard's Ash	5,000	Royal Wootton Bassett, Wiltshire	Promoted from South West 1 East (champions)
Weston-super-Mare	Recreation Ground	3,000	Weston-super-Mare, Somerset	2nd

Locations of the 2021–22 South West Premier teams

=== Final league table ===
2021–22 South West Premier table
Pos	Team	Pld	W	D	L	PF	PA	PD	TB	LB	Pts
1	Exeter University (P)	26	23	0	3	1132	501	+631	22	2	116
2	Old Redcliffians (P)	26	23	0	3	989	517	+472	21	1	114
3	Hornets (P)	26	22	0	4	890	517	+373	17	2	107
4	Weston-super-Mare	26	18	0	8	726	485	+241	12	4	88
5	Exmouth	26	14	1	11	639	657	−18	11	5	74
6	Launceston	26	11	0	15	602	728	−126	12	8	64
7	Brixham	26	10	1	15	582	695	−113	12	6	60
8	Bournemouth	26	10	0	16	639	663	−24	11	9	60
9	Ivybridge	26	9	1	16	746	834	−88	16	6	60
10	Drybrook	26	11	1	14	542	662	−120	6	6	58
11	Camborne	26	9	0	17	582	818	−236	8	5	49
12	Old Centralians	26	7	2	17	619	864	−245	11	4	47
13	Royal Wootton Bassett	26	6	1	19	503	863	−360	5	4	35
14	Okehampton	26	5	1	20	509	896	−387	6	3	31

Updated to match(es) played on 3 May 2022. Source:
Rules for classification: If teams are level at any stage, tiebreakers are applied in the following order:
1. Number of matches won
2. Difference between points for and against
3. Total number of points for
4. Aggregate number of points scored in matches between tied teams
5. Number of matches won excluding the first match, then the second and so on until the tie is settled
  (P) Promoted

== 2020–21 ==
Due to the ongoing pandemic, the 2020–21 season was cancelled.

== 2019–20 ==
The season ended before all the matches were completed because of the coronavirus pandemic and the RFU used a best playing record formula to decide the final table. Barnstaple are the champions.

=== Participating teams ===
Ten of the thirteen teams participated in last season's competition. They are joined by three promoted sides; Launceston, Newbury Blues and Okehampton. Bournemouth were promoted to National League 2 South, while relegated sides included Newton Abbot and Cleve (both South West 1 West), and Old Patesians (South West 1 East). Initially, Bromsgrove were due to be level transferred from Midlands Premier but the withdrawal of Birmingham & Solihull from the league system meant that they stayed put, leaving South West Premier with just thirteen teams.

Team	Ground	Capacity	City/Area	Previous season
Barnstaple	Pottingham Road	2,000 (575 seats)	Barnstaple, Devon	Runners up (lost playoff)
Bracknell	Lily Hill	1,250 (250 seats)	Bracknell, Berkshire	10th
Brixham	Astley Park	1,800 (300 stand)	Brixham, Devon	8th
Camborne	Recreation Ground	7,000 (780 seats)	Camborne, Cornwall	9th
Drybrook	Mannings Ground		Drybrook, Gloucestershire	11th
Exeter University	Topsham Sports Ground		Exeter, Devon	4th
Exmouth	Imperial Recreation Ground	1,250 (250 stand)	Exmouth, Devon	6th
Ivybridge	Cross-in-Hand		Ivybridge, Devon	5th
Launceston	Polson Bridge	3,000 (194 seats)	Launceston, Cornwall	Promoted from South West 1 West (playoff)
Maidenhead	Braywick Park	1,750 (250 seats)	Maidenhead, Berkshire	3rd
Newbury Blues	Monk's Lane	8,000	Newbury, Berkshire	Promoted from South West 1 East (champions)
Okehampton	Showground	1,120 (120 seats)	Okehampton, Devon	Promoted from South West 1 West (champions)
Weston-super-Mare	Recreation Ground	3,000	Weston-super-Mare, Somerset	7th

Locations of the 2019–20 South West Premier teams

=== Final league table ===
2019–20 South West Premier (to 16 March 2020, when play stopped due to COVID-19)
Pos	Team	Pld	W	D	L	PF	PA	PD	TB	LB	Pts
1	Barnstaple (C)	21	16	0	5	542	316	+226	10	3	77
2	Maidenhead	19	10	2	7	534	432	+102	9	6	59
3	Weston-super-Mare	19	11	0	8	458	352	+106	8	5	57
4	Okehampton	20	12	0	8	380	364	+16	4	4	56
5	Brixham	20	11	1	8	398	440	−42	4	3	53
6	Exeter University	21	9	1	11	577	547	+30	10	5	53
7	Drybrook	20	9	0	11	369	386	−17	4	7	47
8	Ivybridge	20	8	3	9	503	468	+35	5	4	47
9	Camborne	20	9	1	10	389	477	−88	5	3	46
10	Exmouth	20	8	1	11	440	473	−33	5	6	45
11	Launceston	19	8	1	10	372	526	−154	3	5	42
12	Newbury Blues	20	7	0	13	395	484	−89	3	6	37
13	Bracknell	19	6	0	13	326	418	−92	4	4	32

Updated to match(es) played on 7 August 2020. Source:
Rules for classification: If teams are level at any stage, tiebreakers are applied in the following order:
1. Number of matches won
2. Difference between points for and against
3. Total number of points for
4. Aggregate number of points scored in matches between tied teams
5. Number of matches won excluding the first match, then the second and so on until the tie is settled
  (C) Champion

Final positions (with adjusted points)
Pos	Team	Pts^{*}
1	Barnstaple (C)	89
2	Weston-super-Mare	73
3	Maidenhead	73
4	Okehampton	67
5	Brixham	64
6	Exeter University	60
7	Drybrook	56
8	Ivybridge	56
9	Camborne	55
10	Exmouth	54
11	Launceston	54
12	Newbury Blues	44
13	Bracknell	39

Updated to match(es) played on 26 December 2020. Source:
(C) Champion

== 2018–19 ==
=== Participating teams ===
Nine of the fourteen teams participated in last season's competition. They are joined by Barnstaple, who were relegated from National League 2 South, and by three promoted sides; Drybrook, Exeter University and Old Patesians. Dings Crusaders (last season's champions) were promoted to National League 2 South, while Hornets and Lydney were both relegated to South West 1 West, and Newbury Blues relegated to South West 1 East.

Team	Ground	Capacity	City/Area	Previous season
Barnstaple	Pottingham Road	2,000 (575 seats)	Barnstaple, Devon	Relegated from National 2 South (14th)
Bournemouth	Chapel Gate	1,500	Bournemouth, Dorset	Runners up (lost play-off)
Bracknell	Lily Hill	1,250 (250 seats)	Bracknell, Berkshire	5th
Brixham	Astley Park	1,800 (300 stand)	Brixham, Devon	10th
Camborne	Recreation Ground	7,000 (780 seats)	Camborne, Cornwall	7th
Cleve	The Hayfields		Mangotsfield, Gloucestershire	6th
Drybrook	Mannings Ground		Drybrook, Gloucestershire	Promoted from South West 1 West (champions)
Exeter University	Topsham Sports Ground		Exeter, Devon	Promoted from South West 1 West (play-off)
Exmouth	Imperial Recreation Ground	1,250 (250 stand)	Exmouth, Devon	11th
Ivybridge	Cross-in-Hand		Ivybridge, Devon	9th
Maidenhead	Braywick Park	1,750 (250 seats)	Maidenhead, Berkshire	3rd
Newton Abbot	Rackerhayes	1,150 (150 stand)	Newton Abbot, Devon	4th
Old Patesians	Everest Road		Cheltenham, Gloucestershire	Promoted from South West 1 East (champions)
Weston-super-Mare	Recreation Ground	3,000	Weston-super-Mare, Somerset	8th

Locations of the 2018–19 South West Premier teams

=== Final league table ===
2018–19 South West Premier table
Pos	Team	Pld	W	D	L	PF	PA	PD	TB	LB	Pts
1	Bournemouth (P)	26	25	0	1	999	352	+647	18	0	118
2	Barnstaple (Q)	26	19	1	6	747	541	+206	12	1	91
3	Maidenhead	26	16	1	9	750	581	+169	16	4	86
4	Exeter University	26	15	1	10	776	650	+126	13	5	80
5	Ivybridge	26	15	0	11	656	601	+55	14	4	78
6	Exmouth	26	13	2	11	698	684	+14	15	4	75
7	Weston-super-Mare	26	12	3	11	765	619	+146	14	5	73
8	Brixham	26	12	1	13	742	642	+100	14	7	71
9	Camborne	26	12	0	14	707	746	−39	15	7	70
10	Bracknell	26	13	0	13	597	601	−4	9	4	65
11	Drybrook	26	12	0	14	533	621	−88	6	2	56
12	Cleve (R)	26	6	0	20	642	841	−199	11	8	43
13	Newton Abbot (R)	26	4	1	21	543	940	−397	7	10	35
14	Old Patesians (R)	26	3	0	23	398	1134	−736	4	3	19

Updated to match(es) played on 9 January 2021. Source:
Rules for classification: If teams are level at any stage, tiebreakers are applied in the following order:
1. Number of matches won
2. Difference between points for and against
3. Total number of points for
4. Aggregate number of points scored in matches between tied teams
5. Number of matches won excluding the first match, then the second and so on until the tie is settled
  (P) Promoted; (Q) Qualified for promotion play-off; (R) Relegated

=== Promotion play-off ===
Each season, the runners-up in the South West Premier (formerly National League 3 South West) and London & South East Premier (National League 3 London & South East) participate in a play-off for the third promotion place to National League 2 South. The team with the best playing record, in this case Westcliff, hosted the match and beat their opponents Barnstaple 44 – 5 to win promotion to National League 2 South for the first time. This was Westcliff's first appearance in the play-offs and Barnstaple's second; in 2016 Barnstaple beat Tonbridge Juddians 31 – 30 at Tonbridge. The home team have won fifteen out of nineteen play-off matches and the south-east team have won the play-off thirteen times.

Team	Pld	W	D	L	PF	PA	PD	TB	LB	Pts
Westcliff (P)	26	19	0	7	808	425	+383	17	5	98
Barnstaple	26	19	1	6	747	541	+206	12	1	91

(P) Promoted

27 April 2019

Westcliff	44 – 5	Barnstaple
	Westcliff

The Gables, Eastwood
Attendance: 750

== 2017–18 ==
=== Participating teams ===
Ten of the fourteen teams participated in last season's competition (when it was known as National League 3 South West). They are joined by Exmouth, who were relegated from National League 2 South, and by three promoted sides; Weston-super-Mare, Maidenhead and Newbury Blues. Old Redcliffians (champions) were promoted to National League 2 South, while Launceston were relegated to (South West 1 West), Salisbury to (South West 1 East) and Bromsgrove to (Midlands 1 West).

Team	Ground	Capacity	City/Area	Previous season
Bournemouth	Chapel Gate	1,500	Bournemouth, Dorset	5th
Bracknell	Lily Hill	1,250 (250 seats)	Bracknell, Berkshire	9th
Brixham	Astley Park	1,800 (300 stand)	Brixham, Devon	7th
Camborne	Recreation Ground	7,000 (780 seats)	Camborne, Cornwall	3rd
Cleve	The Hayfields		Mangotsfield, Gloucestershire	10th
Dings Crusaders	Shaftsbury Park	2,250 (250 seats)	Frenchay, Bristol	2nd (lost play-off)
Exmouth	Imperial Recreation Ground	1,250 (250 stand)	Exmouth, Devon	Relegated from National League 2 South (16th)
Hornets	Hutton Moor Park	1,100 (100 stand)	Weston-super-Mare, Somerset	8th
Ivybridge	Cross-in-Hand		Ivybridge, Devon	6th
Lydney	Regentsholm	3,000 (340 seats)	Lydney, Gloucestershire	11th
Maidenhead	Braywick Park	1,750 (250 seats)	Maidenhead, Berkshire	Promoted from South West 1 East (champions)
Newbury Blues	Monk's Lane	8,000	Newbury, Berkshire	Promoted from South West 1 East (play-offs)
Newton Abbot	Rackerhayes	1,150 (150 stand)	Newton Abbot, Devon	4th
Weston-super-Mare	Recreation Ground	3,000	Weston-super-Mare, Somerset	Promoted from South West 1 West (champions)

Locations of the 2017-18 South West Premier teams

=== Final league table ===
2017–18 South West Premier table
Pos	Team	Pld	W	D	L	PF	PA	PD	TB	LB	Pts
1	Ding Crusaders (P)	26	20	0	6	837	438	+399	16	4	100
2	Bournemouth (Q)	26	17	1	8	761	635	+126	9	4	83
3	Maidenhead	26	13	0	13	780	825	−45	18	4	74
4	Newton Abbot	26	13	0	13	858	713	+145	14	5	71
5	Bracknell	26	12	3	11	635	653	−18	10	5	69
6	Cleve	26	12	1	13	693	699	−6	12	7	69
7	Camborne	26	14	0	12	578	558	+20	6	4	66
8	Weston-super-Mare	26	11	2	13	652	705	−53	14	4	66
9	Ivybridge	26	13	1	12	639	620	+19	10	6	65 (Note: 5 points deducted?)
10	Brixham	26	12	2	12	630	619	+11	8	5	65
11	Exmouth	26	12	1	13	706	737	−31	11	4	65
12	Newbury Blues (R)	26	13	0	13	569	522	+47	7	5	64
13	Hornets (R)	26	8	1	17	536	933	−397	9	2	45
14	Lydney (R)	26	6	0	20	516	733	−217	7	6	37

Updated to match(es) played on 2 January 2021. Source:
Rules for classification: If teams are level at any stage, tiebreakers are applied in the following order:
1. Number of matches won
2. Difference between points for and against
3. Total number of points for
4. Aggregate number of points scored in matches between tied teams
5. Number of matches won excluding the first match, then the second and so on until the tie is settled
  (P) Promoted; (Q) Qualified for promotion playoff; (R) Relegated
  Notes:

=== Promotion play-off ===
Each season, the runners-up in the South West Premier (formerly National League 3 South West) and London & South East Premier (formerly National League 3 London & SE) participate in a play-off for the third promotion place to National League 2 South. The team with the best playing record, in this case Guernsey, hosted the match and beat their opponents Bournemouth 38 – 23 to win promotion. This was Guernsey's first appearance in the play-offs and Bournemouth's second. Bournemouth's previous appearance was in 2011 when they lost to Hertford 23 – 22.

Team	Pld	W	D	L	PF	PA	PD	TB	LB	Pts
Guernsey (P)	26	22	0	4	962	446	+516	19	3	110
Bournemouth	26	17	1	8	761	635	+126	9	4	83

(P) Promoted

28 April 2018
15:00

Guernsey	38 – 23	Bournemouth
	Guernsey; Bournemouth

Footes Lane

== 2016–17 ==
Nine of the fourteen teams participated in last season's competition. They are joined by Launceston who were relegated from National League 2 South, and by two promoted sides: Camborne and Salisbury. Exmouth (champions) and Barnstaple (play-off) were promoted to National League 2 South, while Chippenham were relegated to South West 1 West, and Old Patesians and Old Centralians to South West 1 East. To address a league imbalance due to only one team coming down from National League 2 South, both Bromsgrove and Bracknell have been level transferred into the league from National League 3 Midlands and National League 3 London & SE respectively, Bromsgrove having finished 9th and Bracknell 11th.

Team	Ground	Capacity	City/Area	Previous season
Bournemouth	Chapel Gate	1,500	Bournemouth, Dorset	5th
Bracknell	Lily Hill	1,250 (250 seats)	Bracknell, Berkshire	level transfer from National League 3 London & SE (11th)
Brixham	Astley Park	1,800 (300 stand)	Brixham, Devon	4th
Bromsgrove	Finstall Park		Bromsgrove, Worcestershire	level transfer from National League 3 Midlands (9th)
Camborne	Recreation Ground	7,000 (780 seats)	Camborne, Cornwall	promoted from South West 1 West (champions)
Cleve	The Hayfields		Mangotsfield, Gloucestershire	9th
Dings Crusaders	Landseer Avenue	1,500	Lockleaze, Bristol	10th
Hornets	Hutton Moor Park	1,100 (100 stand)	Weston-super-Mare, Somerset	7th
Ivybridge	Cross-in-Hand		Ivybridge, Devon	8th
Launceston	Polson Bridge	3,000 (194 seats)	Launceston, Cornwall	relegated from 2015–16 National League 2 South (16th)
Lydney	Regentsholm	3,000 (340 seats)	Lydney, Gloucestershire	3rd
Newton Abbot	Rackerhayes	1,150 (150 stand)	Newton Abbot, Devon	11th
Old Redcliffians	Scotland Lane	1,000	Brislington, Bristol	6th
Salisbury	Castle Road	1,500	Salisbury, Wiltshire	promoted from South West 1 East (play-off)

Locations of the 2016-17 South West Premier teams

=== Final league table ===
2016–17 National League 3 South West table
Pos	Team	Pld	W	D	L	PF	PA	PD	TB	LB	Pts
1	Old Redcliffians (P)	26	22	1	3	737	467	+270	14	2	106
2	Ding Crusaders (Q)	26	19	0	7	676	448	+228	8	3	87
3	Camborne	26	16	1	9	685	547	+138	12	4	77 (Note: 5 points deducted?)
4	Newton Abbot	26	14	1	11	702	717	−15	11	6	75
5	Bournemouth	26	12	3	11	777	551	+226	11	7	72
6	Ivybridge	26	14	0	12	646	618	+28	10	5	71
7	Brixham	26	13	2	11	590	594	−4	10	5	71
8	Hornets	26	13	0	13	714	559	+155	13	4	69
9	Bracknell	26	14	0	12	568	625	−57	8	4	68
10	Cleve	26	13	0	13	643	616	+27	10	3	65
11	Lydney	26	10	0	16	454	653	−199	7	4	51
12	Launceston (R)	26	7	1	18	390	619	−229	2	9	41
13	Salisbury (R)	26	7	0	19	500	807	−307	4	7	39
14	Bromsgrove (R)	26	3	1	22	511	772	−261	4	11	29

Updated to match(es) played on 28 April 2017. Source:
Rules for classification: If teams are level at any stage, tiebreakers are applied in the following order:
1. Number of matches won
2. Difference between points for and against
3. Total number of points for
4. Aggregate number of points scored in matches between tied teams
5. Number of matches won excluding the first match, then the second and so on until the tie is settled
  (P) Promoted; (Q) Qualified for the promotion playoff; (R) Relegated
  Notes:

=== Promotion play-off ===
Each season, the runners-up in the National League 3 London & SE, and National League 3 South West participate in a play-off for the third promotion place to National League 2 South. The team with the best playing record, in this case Wimbledon, hosted the match and beat Dings Crusaders 55 – 5 to win promotion.

Team	Pld	W	D	L	PF	PA	PD	TB	LB	Pts
Wimbledon (P)	26	23	0	3	936	399	+537	21	2	115
Dings Crusaders	26	19	0	7	676	448	+228	8	3	87

(P) Promoted

29 April 2017
15:00

Wimbledon	55 – 5	Dings Crusaders
	Wimbledon; Dings

Beverley Meads
Attendance: 350

== 2015–16 ==
Nine of the fourteen teams participated in last season's competition. They are joined by two teams relegated from National League 2 South, Dings Crusaders and Lydney; and by three promoted teams Cleve, Chippenham and Ivybridge. The teams leaving the league were the 2014–15 champions, Redingensians who were promoted to National League 2 South and the relegated teams, Chard and Weston-super-Mare to play in South West 1 West, and Oxford Harlequins to South West 1 East. Bracknell, who finished 3rd last season, transferred to National League 3 London and SE.

=== Participating teams ===
Team	Ground	Capacity	City/Area	Previous season
Barnstaple	Pottington Road	2,000 (575 seats)	Barnstaple, Devon	8th
Bournemouth	Chapel Gate	1,500	Bournemouth, Dorset	9th
Brixham	Astley Park	1,800 (300 stand)	Brixham, Devon	5th
Cleve	The Hayfields		Mangotsfield, Gloucestershire	promoted from South West 1 West (champions)
Chippenham	Allington Fields		Chippenham, Wiltshire	promoted from South West 1 East (champions)
Dings Crusaders	Landseer Avenue	1,500	Lockleaze, Bristol	relegated from 2014–15 National League 2 South (16th)
Exmouth	Imperial Recreation Ground	1,250 (250 stand)	Exmouth, Devon	2nd
Hornets	Hutton Moor Park	1,100 (100 stand)	Weston-super-Mare, Somerset	6th
Ivybridge	Cross-in-Hand		Ivybridge, Devon	promoted from South West 1 West (play-off)
Lydney	Regentsholm	3,000 (340 seats)	Lydney, Gloucestershire	relegated from 2014–15 National League 2 South (14th)
Newton Abbot	Rackerhayes	1,150 (150 stand)	Newton Abbot, Devon	7th
Old Centralians	Saintbridge Sports Centre		Gloucester, Gloucestershire	4th
Old Patesians	Everest Road		Cheltenham, Gloucestershire	10th
Old Redcliffians	Scotland Lane	1,000	Brislington, Bristol	11th

Locations of the 2015-16 National League 3 South West teams

=== Final league table ===
2015–16 National League 3 South West table
Pos	Team	Pld	W	D	L	PF	PA	PD	TB	LB	Pts
1	Exmouth (C, P)	26	21	0	5	921	466	+455	17	2	103
2	Barnstaple (Q, P)	26	20	2	4	715	378	+337	12	2	98
3	Lydney	26	16	1	9	547	488	+59	9	4	79
4	Brixham	26	16	0	10	553	517	+36	9	4	77
5	Bournemouth	26	15	0	11	630	441	+189	8	7	75
6	Old Redcliffians	26	15	2	9	474	437	+37	7	4	75
7	Hornets	26	13	2	11	647	508	+139	13	5	74
8	Ivybridge	26	14	0	12	518	467	+51	7	7	70
9	Cleve	26	12	1	13	598	595	+3	10	3	63
10	Ding Crusaders	26	11	0	15	485	568	−83	5	4	53
11	Newton Abbot	26	9	0	17	573	560	+13	6	11	53
12	Old Centralians (R)	26	11	0	15	494	600	−106	6	2	52
13	Old Patesians (R)	26	3	0	23	466	950	−484	5	5	22
14	Chippenham (R)	26	2	0	24	353	999	−646	4	3	15

Updated to match(es) played on 30 April 2016. Source: "National League 3 South West". England Rugby.
Rules for classification: If teams are level at any stage, tiebreakers are applied in the following order:
1. Number of matches won
2. Difference between points for and against
3. Total number of points for
4. Aggregate number of points scored in matches between tied teams
5. Number of matches won excluding the first match, then the second and so on until the tie is settled
  (C) Champion; (P) Promoted; (Q) Qualified for the promotion playoff; (R) Relegated

=== Promotion play-off ===
Each season, the runners-up in the National League 3 London and SE, and National League 3 South West participate in a play-off for promotion to National League 2 South. The team with the best playing record, in this case Tonbridge Juddians, host the match and their opponents were Barnstaple, who won the match 30 – 31, scoring the winning points with a penalty in the last seconds of the match.

Team	Pld	W	D	L	PF	PA	PD	TB	LB	Pts
Tonbridge Juddians	26	21	1	4	833	395	+438	13	2	101
Barnstaple (P)	26	20	2	4	715	378	+337	12	2	98

(P) Promoted

30 April 2016
15:00

Tonbridge Juddians	30 – 31	Barnstaple
	Juddians; Barnstaple

The Slade
Attendance: 600
Referee: Matt Turvey

== 2014–15 ==
=== Participating teams ===
Team	Ground	Capacity	City/Area	Previous season
Barnstaple	Pottington Road	2,000 (575 seats)	Barnstaple, Devon	8th
Bournemouth	Chapel Gate	1,500	Bournemouth, Dorset	relegated from National League 2 South
Bracknell	Lily Hill Park	1,250	Bracknell, Berkshire	3rd
Brixham	Astley Park	1,800 (300 stand)	Brixham, Devon	7th
Chard	The Park, Essex Close		Chard, Somerset	promoted from South West 1 West
Exmouth	Imperial Recreation Ground	1,250 (250 stand)	Exmouth, Devon	relegated from National League 2 South
Hornets	Hutton Moor Park	1,100 (100 stand)	Weston-super-Mare, Somerset	promoted from South West 1 West
Newton Abbot	Rackerhayes	1,150 (150 stand)	Newton Abbot, Devon	4th
Old Centralians	Saintbridge Sports Centre		Gloucester, Gloucestershire	11th
Old Patesians	Everest Road		Cheltenham, Gloucestershire	10th
Old Redcliffians	Scotland Lane	1,000	Brislington, Bristol	6th
Oxford Harlequins	Marston Ferry Road		North Hinksey, Oxfordshire	promoted from South West 1 East
Redingensians	Old Bath Road		Sonning, Berkshire	2nd
Weston-super-Mare	Recreation Ground	3,000	Weston-super-Mare, Somerset	9th

=== Final league table ===
2014–15 National League 3 South West
Pos	Team	Pld	W	D	L	PF	PA	PD	TB	LB	Pts
1	Redingensians (C, P)	26	22	0	4	934	359	+575	18	2	108
2	Exmouth (Q)	26	21	0	5	820	426	+394	13	2	99
3	Bracknell	26	17	0	9	747	565	+182	13	6	87
4	Old Centralians	26	18	1	7	672	551	+121	7	3	84
5	Brixham	26	17	0	9	692	577	+115	12	4	84
6	Hornets	26	16	0	10	695	557	+138	13	5	82
7	Newton Abbot	26	11	1	14	654	670	−16	11	7	64
8	Barnstaple	26	11	2	13	605	582	+23	10	5	63
9	Bournemouth	26	11	1	14	590	630	−40	9	4	59
10	Old Patesians	26	9	1	16	533	755	−222	10	6	54
11	Old Redcliffians	26	10	2	14	439	642	−203	2	4	50
12	Weston-super-Mare (R)	26	7	0	19	469	652	−183	5	6	39
13	Oxford Harlequins (R)	26	6	0	20	431	825	−394	6	3	33
14	Chard (R)	26	2	0	24	409	899	−490	2	4	14

Updated to match(es) played on 4 May 2015. Source: "National League 3 South West". England Rugby.
Rules for classification: If teams are level at any stage, tiebreakers are applied in the following order:
1. Number of matches won
2. Difference between points for and against
3. Total number of points for
4. Aggregate number of points scored in matches between tied teams
5. Number of matches won excluding the first match, then the second and so on until the tie is settled
  (C) Champion; (P) Promoted; (Q) Qualified for promotion playoff; (R) Relegated

=== Promotion play-off ===
Each season, the runners-up in the National League 3 London and SE, and National League 3 South West participate in a play-off for promotion to National League 2 South. The team with the best playing record, in this case Exmouth, hosts the match; their opponents were Barnes and the match was played on 25 April 2015. At the end of full-time the match score was 22 – 22, and Barnes scored the only points in extra-time, to win the match 27– 22.

Team	Pld	W	D	L	PF	PA	PD	TB	LB	Pts
Exmouth	26	21	0	5	820	426	+394	13	2	99
Barnes (P)	26	19	0	7	638	492	+146	13	2	91

(P) Promoted

25 April 2015
14:30

Exmouth	22 – 27	Barnes

Imperial Recreation Ground
Attendance: 1,000

After extra time (80 mins: 22 – 22)

== 2013–14 ==
- Amersham & Chiltern RFC
- Avonmouth Old Boys
- Barnstaple
- Bracknell (promoted from South West 1 East)
- Brixham
- Chippenham
- Lydney (relegated from National League 2 South)
- Newton Abbot
- Old Centralians (promoted from South West 1 East)
- Old Patesians
- Old Redcliffians (promoted from South West 1 West)
- Redingensians
- Weston-super-Mare
- Worcester Wanderers (promoted from Midlands 1 West)

=== League winners ===
- Lydney (promoted to National League 2 South)

=== Relegated ===
- Avonmouth Old Boys (relegated to South West 1 West)
- Chippenham (relegated to South West 1 East)
- Worcester Wanderers (relegated to Midlands 1 West)

=== Transferred ===
- Amersham & Chiltern RFC (transferred to National League 3 London & SE)

=== Final league table ===
2013–14 National League 3 South West Final table
Pos	Team	Pld	W	D	L	PF	PA	PD	TB	LB	Pts
1	Lydney (C, P)	26	24	1	1	919	385	+534	20	1	119
2	Redingensians	26	20	2	4	719	363	+356	16	2	102
3	Bracknell	26	19	1	6	706	425	+281	14	3	95
4	Newton Abbot	26	15	0	11	663	603	+60	12	3	75
5	Amersham & Chiltern RFC	26	12	1	13	595	409	+186	13	6	69
6	O Redcliffians	26	14	2	10	501	500	+1	6	2	68
7	Brixham	26	13	0	13	591	618	−27	10	6	68
8	Barnstaple	26	13	1	12	508	585	−77	7	2	63
9	Weston-super-Mare	26	11	0	15	612	645	−33	8	6	58
10	O Patesians	26	9	0	17	516	778	−262	9	5	50
11	O Centralians	26	9	1	16	500	640	−140	7	6	46 (Note: Old Centralians deducted 5 points)
12	Worcester Wanderers (R)	26	9	0	17	440	696	−256	7	3	46
13	Avonmouth Old Boys (R)	26	5	1	20	373	617	−244	2	7	31
14	Chippenham (R)	26	4	0	22	381	760	−379	5	6	27

Updated to match(es) played on 9 May 2014. Source:
Rules for classification: If teams are level at any stage, tiebreakers are applied in the following order:
1. Number of matches won
2. Difference between points for and against
3. Total number of points for
4. Aggregate number of points scored in matches between tied teams
5. Number of matches won excluding the first match, then the second and so on until the tie is settled
  (C) Champion; (P) Promoted; (R) Relegated
  Notes:

== 2012–13 ==
- Amersham & Chiltern RFC
- Avonmouth Old Boys
- Barnstaple
- Brixham
- Chippenham
- Exmouth
- London Irish Amateur (transferred from National League 3 London & SE)
- Maidenhead (promoted from South West 1 East)
- Malvern
- Newton Abbot
- Old Patesians
- Oxford Harlequins
- Redingensians
- Weston-super-Mare

== 2011–12 ==
- Amersham & Chiltern RFC
- Barnstaple
- Bournemouth
- Bridgwater & Albion
- Chinnor
- Chippenham
- Exmouth
- Newbury Blues (relegated from National League 2 South)
- Newton Abbot
- Old Patesians
- Old Redcliffians
- Oxford Harlequins
- Redingensians
- Weston-super-Mare

== 2010–11 ==
- Barnstaple
- Bournemouth
- Bridgwater & Albion
- Cheltenham
- Chinnor
- Cleve
- Coney Hill
- Exmouth
- Hartpury College
- Newton Abbot
- Old Patesians
- Oxford Harlequins
- Redingensians
- Weston-super-Mare

== 2009–10 ==
The first season as a national league

- Barnstaple
- Bournemouth
- Chinnor
- Chippenham
- Cleve
- Coney Hill
- Exmouth
- Maidenhead (promoted from South West 1 East)
- Old Patesians
- Oxford Harlequins
- Reading
- Redingensians
- Taunton
- Weston-super-Mare

== 2007–08 ==
2007–08 South West Division 1 table
Pos	Team	Pld	W	D	L	PF	PA	PD	Pts
1	Chinnor	22	19	2	1	665	317	+348	40
2	Bracknell	22	19	0	3	640	292	+348	38
3	Weston-super-Mare	22	13	1	8	496	413	+83	27
4	Cleve	22	13	0	9	469	417	+52	26
5	Bournemouth	22	11	1	10	520	405	+115	21 (Note: Oxford Harlequins and Bournemouth were deducted two points each for fielding ineligible players)
6	Old Patesians	22	9	2	11	477	362	+115	20
7	Oxford Harlequins	22	9	2	11	472	452	+20	18
8	Redingensians	22	9	0	13	403	459	−56	18
9	Coney Hill	22	9	0	13	411	534	−123	18
10	Reading	22	7	2	13	483	587	−104	16
11	Maidenhead	22	7	1	14	416	584	−168	15
12	St Ives (SW)*	22	1	1	20	158	788	−630	1 (Note: St Ives were deducted two points for failing to field a team against Bracknell)

Updated to match(es) played on 2008 April 19. Source: rfu.com

== Original teams ==
When league rugby began in 1987 this division contained the following teams:

- Bournemouth
- Bridgwater & Albion
- Clifton
- High Wycombe
- Oxford
- Maidenhead
- Redruth
- St Ives
- Taunton
- Torquay Athletic
- Weston-super-Mare

== Regional 1 South West honours ==
In the first season of the English rugby union league pyramid, sponsored by Courage, there was four, tier five leagues. The geographical area for teams in South West Division One covered an area of south-west England from Oxfordshire and Berkshire in the east to Cornwall in the west. There were eleven teams in the league and they played each team once, giving each team ten matches. The other tier five leagues were London 1, Midlands 1 and North 1. This system prevailed for five seasons, and in 1992–93 the number of teams increased from eleven to thirteen. The following season (1993–94) the league was reorganised and the four tier five leagues became two; National 5 North and National 5 South. After three seasons, in 1996–97, a further reorganisation occurred, and there was a return to four, tier five leagues; with South West Division One covering the area of south-west England from Berkshire westwards. This system prevailed until 2009–10 when the number of teams was increased from twelve to fourteen and renamed National League Three South West. There was a name change for the beginning of season 2017–18 when the division was renamed the South West Premier.

=== South West 1 (1987–1993) ===
The original South West 1 was a tier 5 league with promotion up to Area League 2 South and relegation down to South West 2 (presently split into two leagues known as South West 1 East and South West 1 West).

South West 1
Season	No of teams	No of matches	Champions	Runners-up	Relegated teams	Ref
1987–88	11	10	Redruth	High Wycombe	Bournemouth	
1988–89	11	10	Clifton	High Wycombe	Torquay Athletic, Bridgwater & Albion	
1989–90	11	10	Maidenhead	Weston-super-Mare	Oxford	
1990–91	11	10	High Wycombe	Reading	Matson, Stroud, Taunton	
1991–92	11	10	Berry Hill	Cinderford	No relegation	
1992–93	13	12	Reading	Henley	Penryn	

=== South West 1 (1993–96) ===
The top six teams from South West 1 and the top six from London 1 were combined to create National 5 South. South West 1 dropped to become a tier six league and was one of two feeder leagues for National 5 South. Relegation continued to South West 2 (currently South West 1 East and South West 1 West).

South West 1
Season	No of teams	No of matches	Champions	Runners-up	Relegated teams	Ref
1993–94	13	12	Henley	Cheltenham	Gordon League	
1994–95	13	12	Cheltenham	Newbury	Stroud	
1995–96	13	12	Newbury	Gloucester Old Boys	Cinderford	

=== South West 1 (1996–2009) ===
At the end of the 1995–96 season National 5 South was discontinued and South West 1 returned to being a tier 5 league. Promotion was up to National 4 South (now known as National League 2 South), while the splitting of South West 2 into two regional divisions, meant that relegation was now down to either South West 2 East or South West 2 West (currently South West 1 East / South West 1 West).

South West 1
Season	No of teams	No of matches	Champions	Runners-up	Relegated teams	Ref
1996–97	12	22	Bridgwater & Albion	Launceston	Brixham, Camborne	
1997–98	12	22	Bracknell	Launceston	High Wycombe, St Ives	
1998–99	12	22	Penzance & Newlyn	Launceston	Salisbury	
1999–00	12	22	Launceston	Keynsham	Matson, Stroud	
2000–01	12	22	Old Patesians	Cinderford	Berry Hill, Truro, Torquay Athletic, Gloucester Old Boys	
2001–02	12	22	Weston-super-Mare	Dings Crusaders	Stroud, Maidenhead, Swanage & Warham, Dorcester	
2002–03	12	22	Dings Crusaders	Reading	Berry Hill, Marlow	
2003–04	12	22	Reading	Cinderford	Barnstaple, Truro	
2004–05	12	22	Cinderford	Bridgwater & Albion	St Mary's Old Boys, Gloucester Old Boys, Keynsham	
2005–06	12	22	Chinnor	Clifton	Penryn, Cheltenham, Spartans	
2006–07	12	22	Mounts Bay	Cleve	Chippenham, Clevedon, Reading Abbey	
2007–08	12	22	Chinnor	Bracknell	Reading, Maidenhead, St Ives	
2008–09	12	22	Clifton	Bracknell	No relegation	

=== National League 3 South West (2009–2017) ===
The division was renamed National League 3 South West following a restructuring of the national leagues which led to changes at all levels. It remained a tier 5 league with promotion up to National League 2 South (formerly National League 3 South) and relegation to either South West 1 East or South West 1 West (formerly South West 2 East / South West 2 West).

National League 3 South West
Season	No of teams	No of matches	Champions	Runners-up	Relegated teams	Ref
2009–10	14	26	Taunton	Old Patesians	Maidenhead, Chippenham, Reading	
2010–11	14	26	Hartpury College	Bournemouth	Cleve, Coney Hill, Cheltenham	
2011–12	14	26	Bournemouth	Chinnor	Bridgwater & Albion, Newbury Blues, Old Redcliffians	
2012–13	14	26	London Irish Amateur	Exmouth	Maidenhead, Oxford Harlequins, Malvern	
2013–14	14	26	Lydney	Redingensians	Chippenham, Avonmouth Old Boys, Worcester Wanderers	
2014–15	14	26	Redingensians	Exmouth	Chard, Oxford Harlequins, Weston-super-Mare	
2015–16	14	26	Exmouth	Barnstaple	Chippenham, Old Patesians, Old Centralians	
2016–17	14	26	Old Redcliffians	Dings Crusaders	Bromsgrove, Salisbury, Launceston	
Green background are the promotion places.

=== South West Premier (2017–2022) ===
For the 2017–18 season all divisions at tier 5 were renamed from National League 3 to Premier meaning that National League 3 South West became known as South West Premier. Promotion continued to National League 2 South and relegation to either South West 1 East or South West 1 West.

South West Premier
Season	No of teams	No of matches	Champions	Runners-up	Relegated teams	Ref
2017–18	14	26	Dings Crusaders	Bournemouth	Lydney, Hornets, Newbury Blues	
2018–19	14	26	Bournemouth	Barnstaple	Old Patesians, Newton Abbot, Cleve	
2019–20	13 (Note: League reduced to 13 teams following the withdrawal of Birmingham & Solihull from Midlands Premier, leaving level 5 with an imbalance of teams.)	20 (Note: Due to the COVID-19 pandemic in the United Kingdom the RFU cancelled all rugby below the Premiership with most clubs in South West Premier having played 20 games, and a best playing record formula was used to decide the final table.)	Barnstaple	Weston-super-Mare	Bracknell, Newbury Blues	
2020–21	14	26	Cancelled due to COVID-19 pandemic in the United Kingdom.			
2021–22	14	26	Exeter University	Old Redcliffians	Hornets also promoted.	
Green background are the promotion places.

=== Regional 1 South West (2022–2025) ===
From 2022–23 season the number of tier 5 leagues was increased from four to six.

Regional 1 South West
Season	No of teams	No of matches	Champions	Runners-up	Relegated teams	Ref
2022–23	12	22	Camborne	Chew Valley	Old Centralians (11th) and Drybrook (12th)	
2023–24	12	22	Devonport Services	Barnstaple	Okehampton (11th) and Weston-super-Mare (12th)	
2024–25	12	22	Barnstaple	Brixham	Ivybridge (12th)	

=== Regional 1 South West (2025– ) ===
Regional 1 South West continued to be a tier 5 league. Promotion and relegation play-offs were introduced.

Regional 1 South West
Season	No of teams	No of matches	Champions	2nd	3rd	Relegated teams	Ref
2025–26	12	22	Devonport Services	Topsham	Brixham	Marlborough (11th) and Matson (12th)	
Green background is the promotion place.

== Promotion play-offs ==
From 2000–01 season there was a promotion play-off game between the runners-up of London & South East Premier and South West Premier for the third and final promotion place to National League 2 South; with the team with the superior league record having home advantage. As of the 2018–19 season, the London and south-east teams have been most successful with thirteen wins to the south-west teams six, while the home side have won fifteen of the nineteen ties. The last play-off was in 2018–19, with the next two seasons cancelled due to the COVID-19 pandemic in the United Kingdom and following the increase of leagues at this level to three, only the champions are promoted.

South West Premier v London & South East Premier promotion play-off results
Season	Home team	Score	Away team	Venue	Attendance	Reference
2000–01	Cinderford (SW)	26–10	Havant (LSE)	Dockham Road, Cinderford, Gloucestershire		
2001–02	Basingstoke (LSE)	29–13	Dings Crusaders (SW)	Down Grange, Basingstoke, Hampshire		
2002–03	Haywards Heath (LSE)	34–21	Reading (SW)	Whiteman's Green, Cuckfield, West Sussex		
2003–04	Hertford (LSE)	25–14	Cinderford (SW)	Highfields, Ware, Hertfordshire		
2004–05	Worthing Raiders (LSE)	26–30	Bridgwater & Albion (SW)	Roundstone Lane, Angmering, West Sussex	1,200	
2005–06	Richmond (LSE)	3–12	Clifton (SW)	Athletic Ground, Richmond, Greater London	1,100	
2006–07	Ealing Trailfinders (LSE)	48–16	Cleve (SW)	Trailfinders Sports Ground, Ealing, Greater London		
2007–08	Worthing Raiders (LSE)	18–5	Bracknell (SW)	Roundstone Lane, Angmering, West Sussex		
2008–09	Barnes (LSE)	39–18	Bracknell (SW)	Barn Elms, Barnes, Greater London		
2009–10	Old Albanian (LSE)	15–0	Old Patesians (SW)	Woollam Playing Fields, St Albans, Hertfordshire		
2010–11	Hertford (LSE)	23–22	Bournemouth (SW)	Highfields, Ware, Hertfordshire	1,000	
2011–12	Chinnor (SW)	19–8	Tonbridge Juddian (LSE)	Kingsey Road, Thame, Oxfordshire		
2012–13	Exmouth (SW)	21–20	Dorking (LSE)	Imperial Recreation Ground, Exmouth, Devon		
2013–14	Old Elthamians (LSE)	17–10	Redingensians (SW)	Queen Mary Sports Ground, Chislehurst, Kent	1,350	
2014–15	Exmouth (SW)	22–27 (aet)	Barnes (LSE)	Imperial Recreation Ground, Exmouth, Devon	1,000	
2015–16	Tonbridge Juddian (LSE)	30–31	Barnstaple (SW)	The Slade, Tonbridge, Kent	600	
2016–17	Wimbledon (LSE)	55–5	Dings Crusaders (SW)	Beverley Meads, Raynes Park, Greater London	350	
2017–18	Guernsey (LSE)	38–23	Bournemouth (SW)	Footes Lane, Saint Peter Port, Guernsey		
2018–19	Westcliff (LSE)	44–5	Barnstaple (SW)	The Gables, Eastwood, Essex	750	
2019–20	Cancelled due to COVID-19 pandemic in the United Kingdom. Best ranked runner up – Guernsey (LSE) – promoted instead.					
2021–22	Cancelled due to COVID-19 pandemic in the United Kingdom.					
2022–23	Cancelled due to national league reorganisation.					
Green background represent the promoted teams. (LSE = London & South East teams while SW = South West teams).

== Number of league titles ==
- Barnstaple (2)
- Bournemouth (2)
- Chinnor (2)
- Clifton (2)
- Devonport Services (2)
- Dings Crusaders (2)
- Reading (2)
- Berry Hill (1)
- Bracknell (1)
- Bridgwater & Albion (1)
- Camborne (1)
- Cheltenham (1)
- Cinderford (1)
- Exeter University (1)
- Exmouth (1)
- Hartpury College (1)
- Henley (1)
- High Wycombe (1)
- Launceston (1)
- London Irish Amateur (1)
- Lydney (1)
- Maidenhead (1)
- Mounts Bay (1)
- Newbury (1)
- Old Patesians (1)
- Old Redcliffians (1)
- Penzance & Newlyn (1) (Note: Penzance & Newlyn are now known as the Cornish Pirates.)
- Redingensians (1)
- Redruth (1)
- Taunton (1)
- Weston-super-Mare (1)

== See also ==
- South West Division RFU
- English rugby union system
- Rugby union in England
