= Somerset Senior Vase =

Rugby competition

- Sport: Rugby Union
- Instituted: 2005; 21 years ago
- Country: England
- Holders: Clevedon RFC (2025-26)
- Most titles: Midsomer Norton (3 titles)
- Website: Somerset RFU

The Somerset Senior Vase is an annual rugby union knock-out club competition organized by the Somerset Rugby Football Union. It was first introduced during the 2005-06 season, with the inaugural winners being St Bernadette's. It is the second most important rugby union cup competition in Somerset, behind the Senior Cup.

The Senior Vase is currently open to club sides based in Somerset and parts of Bristol that are outside of the top 16 teams in the county, typically playing in tier 7 (Counties 1), tier 8 (Counties 2) and tier 9 (Somerset 1) of the English rugby union league system. While the Somerset leagues have 1st and 2nd XV taking part in league games, like the Somerset Senior Cup, the Vase only allows 1st teams to enter. The format is a knockout cup with a quarter-finals, semi-finals and a final to be held at a neutral venue between March–May.

== Somerset Senior Vase winners ==
Somerset Senior Vase Finals
Season	Winner	Score	Runners–up	Venue
2004-05	St Bernadette's	12-6	Minehead	
2006-07	Midsomer Norton	32-26	Wellington	
2007-08	Wells	56-18	Avon	Recreation Ground, Weston-super-Mare
2008-09	Tor	16-15	Burnham-on-Sea	Beggars Brook, North Petherton
2009-10	Bristol Harlequins	11-6	Wells	Beggars Brook, North Petherton
2010-11	Wellington	13-0	Stothert & Pitt	Recreation Ground, Weston-super-Mare
2011-12	Gordano	31-7	Old Bristolians	Recreation Ground, Weston-super-Mare
2012-13	Chew Valley	16-8	Gordano	Recreation Ground, Weston-super-Mare
2013-14	Chew Valley	31-24	Bristol Harlequins	Recreation Ground, Weston-super-Mare
2014-15	Midsomer Norton	25-22	Bristol Harlequins	Recreation Ground, Weston-super-Mare
2015-16	Yatton	62-17	Tor	Recreation Ground, Weston-super-Mare
2016-17	Tor	21-19	Yeovil	Hutton Moor, Weston-super-Mare
2017-18	Wellington	45-17	Winscombe	Beggars Brook, North Petherton
2018–19	Burnham-on-Sea	38-13	Yatton	Hutton Moor Park, Weston-super-Mare
2020–21	Burnham-on-Sea	27-12	Yeovil	
2022–23	Hornets	23-21	Castle Cary	
2023–24	Imperial	26-16	Hornets III	
2024–25	Midsomer Norton	47-21	Clevedon	Chew Valley RFC
2025–26	Clevedon	71-19	Old Sulians	Chew Valley RFC

== Number of wins ==
- Midsomer Norton (3)
- Chew Valley (2)
- Tor (2)
- Bunham-On-Sea (2)
- Chew Valley (2)
- Wellington (2)
- Bristol Harlequins (1)
- Burnham-on-Sea (1)
- Clevedon (1)
- Gordano (1)
- Wells (1)
- Yatton (1)

== See also ==
- Somerset RFU
- Somerset Senior Cup
- English rugby union system
- Rugby union in England
