= Charles Attenborough =

Charles Attenborough may refer to:

- Charles Attenborough (weightlifter) (1902–1961), British weightlifter
- Charles Leete Attenborough (1853–1937), English solicitor and barrister, judge, and legal scholar
