= Henry Alleyne Palmer =

English barrister and Registrar of Criminal Appeals (1893–1965)

- Born: 13 November 1893
- Died: 15 August 1965 (aged 71)
- Education: University College, Oxford
- Occupation: Barrister
- Known for: Criminal law
- Notable work: Harris's Criminal Law
- Military career
- Allegiance: United Kingdom
- Branch: British Army
- Conflicts: WWI, WWII

Henry Alleyne Palmer (13 November 1893 - 15 August 1965) was an English barrister and legal scholar who served as the Queen's Coroner and Attorney, Master of the Crown Office, and Registrar of the Court of Criminal Appeal.

== Early life ==
Palmer was born on 13 November 1893, and he was educated at Charterhouse School and University College, Oxford. He was commissioned in the Middlesex Regiment (Territorial Army) during the Great War, demobilised in 1919, and called to the Bar by the Inner Temple in 1921.

== Career ==
Palmer practiced at the bar from 1921 until 1940, when he was recalled from Reserve for Army Service during the Second World War. He was demobilised and placed on retired list in 1945.

After the war, he returned to the Bar and entered the field of law reporting. In 1948 he was appointed Assistant Registrar of the Court of Criminal Appeal, and the following year he was also appointed Registrar of the Court-Martial Appeal Court and made an Assistant Master. From 1962 until 1965, Palmer was Queen's Coroner and Attorney, Master of the Crown Office, and Registrar of the Court of Criminal Appeal.

Palmer co-wrote the 19th and 20th editions (1954, 1960) of Harris's Criminal Law with his son.

== Personal life ==
Palmer married Maud (née Obbard) in 1925 and they had two children. Their son was Henry Palmer.
