= David Jewell (headmaster) =

British independent school headmaster

David Jewell (24 March 1934 – 21 May 2006) was a British independent school headmaster during the late 20th century.

== Life and career ==
David Jewell was born in 1934 in Porthleven, West Cornwall, the son of a Wing Commander in the Royal Air Force.

Jewell was educated at Blundell's School and St John's College, Oxford, where he studied chemistry and met his future wife, Katharine. He then took up his first teaching post as science master at Winchester College. After a brief period working in a state school in Bristol, he returned to the independent sector at the age of 36 as headmaster of Bristol Cathedral School, which he led from direct-grant status to independence.

Later, he became headmaster of Repton School, a boys' school in England, and was subsequently headmaster of Haileybury and Imperial Service College. He presided over significant changes in both these schools. In 1990 he served as chairman of the Headmasters' and Headmistresses' Conference and as a councillor on Porthleven town council.

== Personal and political views ==
Jewell was a firm supporter of direct-grant schools and was influential in campaigning for the introduction of the assisted places scheme . He was also a committed Anglican Christian.
