= Reece Winstone =

Reece Winstone FRPS (1909–1991) was an English photographer from Bristol. He edited and self-published the 'Bristol As It Was' books of photographs of Bristol, covering in detail the period from the dawn of photography to 1962.

== Career ==
Frank Reece Winstone was born on 3 September 1909 to John ('Jack') and Lillian Winstone, at 13 Elvaston Road, Bedminster, Bristol.

He attended Bristol Cathedral School from 1920 to 1925, and while there started photography as a hobby.

On leaving school, Winstone joined his father's menswear business at 29 East Street, Bedminster, where he learnt about salesmanship and display, whilst practising photography at night. He remained an amateur photographer until his father retired in 1937, at which time he became a full-time freelance.

After wartime service in the RAF Mobile Field Photographic Section, during which time he adopted the name 'Reece' for his professional work, Winstone moved to 23 Hyland Grove, Henbury, Bristol. This was to be his home and business address for the next 40 years.

In 1948, Winstone gave his first public 'Lantern Lecture' (or slide show) on 'Old Bristol', with some success. Through the 1950s he expanded his collection of Bristol photographs, and began to campaign on issues such as the High Cross (removed from College Green), the Friese-Greene birthplace and contribution to invention of cinematography, and to highlight the destruction being wrought by post-war development.

Reece has a claim to be the first person to publish photographs of vanished scenes: his first 'Bristol As It Was' title (Bristol As It Was 1939–1914) was published in 1957, and eventually ran to 5 editions selling a total of 20,000 copies. He went on to publish a further 36 volumes, the last (Bristol As It Was 1940–1960) being published in 1988. The earlier books reflected in their titles Winstone's personal memory of history; in the period before 1939 the dates run backwards (so Bristol As It Was 1939–1914), whereas in his books covering periods after his publishing began or before his birth in 1909 they run forwards (so Bristol As It Was 1953–1956). From 1950 onwards, Winstone took photographs of scenes which were soon to change as a result of redevelopment, with the express intent of publishing them in book form a decade later.

Winstone's accession log details the 43,427 photographs he took between 4 December 1924 and 6 February 1988, many of which were in fulfilment of his self-appointed role as 'photographic recorder of Bristol', although the greater part was the creation of his library of 'Beautiful Britain' photographs. In addition he amassed a large collection of historic photographs of the city, and was meticulous in dating and captioning them, and thus Bristol's history since the mid-19th century is well documented photographically. Photographs attributed to Winstone are held in the Conway Library at The Courtauld Institute of Art.

Reece was awarded the Fellowship of the Royal Photographic Society for his contribution to photographic history.

== Reece Winstone Archive ==
After Winstone's death, further volumes in the Bristol As It Was series were published by his son John.

Reproductions of photographs from the collection (now the 'Reece Winstone Archive') can be obtained on payment of a fee.

== Publications ==
Title	ISBN
Bristol As It Was 1939–1914	0-900814-54-3
Bristol As It Was 1914–1900	0-900814-41-1
Bristol Today	0-900814-37-3
Bristol in the 1890s	0-900814-42-X
Bristol in the 1940s	0-900814-61-6
Bristol in the 1880s	0-900814-55-1
Bristol As It Was 1879–1874	0-900814-64-0
Bristol As It Was 1950–1953	0-900814-60-3
Bristol As It Was 1874–1866	
Bristol's History Volume I	0-900814-29-2
Bristol As It Was 1866–1860	0-900814-40-3
Bristol Fashion	
Bristol in the 1850s	0-900814-53-5
Bristol As It Was 1953–1956	0-900814-56-X
Bristol's Earliest Photographs	0-900814-32-2
Bristol Tradition	
Bristol in the 1920s	0-900814-32-2
Bristol As It Was 1956–1959	0-900814-39-X
Bristol Blitzed	0-900814-43-8
Ann Green of Clifton	
Bristol's Trams	0-900814-45-4
Bristol's History Volume II	
Bristol As It Was 1913–1921	0-900814-48-9
History of Bristol's Suburbs	
Bristol's Suburbs in the 1920s & 30s	
Bristol As It Was 1928–1933	0-900814-57-8
Bath As It Was	
Bristol As It Was 1960–1962	0-900814-62-4
Bristol As It Was 1845–1900	0-900814-63-9
Bristol's Suburbs Long Ago	0-900814-65-2
Bristol As It Was 1934–1936	0-900814-66-4
Bristol As It Was 1937–1939	
Changes in the Face of Bristol	
Bristol As It Was 1940–1960	
