= Peter Morrish (barrister) =

English barrister (1927–2005)

- Born: 16 April 1927
- Died: 26 November 2005 (aged 78)
- Education: Edinburgh University
- Occupation: Barrister
- Known for: Criminal law
- Notable work: Harris's Criminal Law
- Military career
- Allegiance: United Kingdom
- Branch: Royal Navy

Peter Jeffery Morrish (16 April 1927 – 26 November 2005) was an English barrister, court official and authoritative legal author.

== Biography ==
He was born on 16 April 1927 in Portsmouth, Hampshire, and educated at Winchester College and Edinburgh University. After university, Morrish served in the Royal Navy, and as police officer and then public prosecutor in Northern Rhodesia.

He returned to the UK and was called to the bar by Gray's Inn in 1962. He served at the North London court and the Inner London Quarter Sessions, was deputy clerk at Middlesex Quarter Sessions, and then deputy clerk of the peace for Lancashire at Preston. He was later deputy clerk of arraigns at the Central Criminal Court and then a deputy registrar to the Criminal Division of the Court of Appeal.

Morrish went into practice at the bar later in his career, founding and being a head of a common law set of chambers at Goldsmith Building with an emphasis on criminal and family work.

== Published works ==
He published widely during his career, including:

- Morrish, Peter; McLean, Ian (1971). Practical Guide to Appeals in Criminal Courts. London: Sweet & Maxwell Ltd. ISBN 978-0-421-13920-6.
- Ian McLean; Peter Morrish, eds. (1973). Harris's Criminal Law (22nd ed.). London: Sweet & Maxwell. ISBN 0-421-16120-5.
- McLean, Ian; Morrish, Peter (1975). The Trial of Breathalyser Offences: A Practitioner's Index of Practice and Procedure. Chichester: B. Rose. ISBN 978-0-85992-035-3.
- Morrish, Peter; McLean, Ian (1987). The Trial of Breathalyser Offences: A Practitioner's Index of Practice and Procedure (2nd ed.). Sweet & Maxwell. ISBN 978-1-870080-11-8.
- McLean, Ian; Morrish, Peter (1990). The Trial of Breathalyser Offences: A Practitioner's Index of Practice and Procedure (3rd ed.). London: Sweet & Maxwell. ISBN 978-0-85121-681-2.
- Katkhuda, Sam; Morrish, Peter (1990). Forms of Indictment. London: Longman. ISBN 978-0-85121-654-6.
- Magistrates' Courts Index (1st-13 edns) (1973–2003).
- Crown Court Index (1st-26th edns) (1972–2006).

He was also a contributor to the Criminal Law title of the 4th (Hailsham) issue of Halsbury's Laws of England. His final work, Public Prosecutor’s Handbook was in preparation at the time of his death.

== Death ==
Morrish was aged 78 when he died on 26 November 2005.
