= Ron Price =

- Full name: Edwin Ronald Price
- Born: 16 September 1915 Trealaw, Wales
- Died: 6 November 1997 (aged 82) Weston-super-Mare, England

Rugby union career
- Position: Second row
International career
Years	Team	Apps	(Points)
1939	Wales	2	(0)

Edwin Ronald Price (16 September 1915 – 6 November 1997) was a Welsh international rugby union player.

Price hailed from the town of Porth in the Rhondda Valley.

A forward, Price played for Somerset club Weston-super-Mare and was capped twice for Wales during the 1939 Home Nations Championship, before international rugby was paused due to the war. He represented a Welsh Services XV while with the Royal Air Force, but gained no further caps.

== See also ==
- List of Wales national rugby union players
