= Henry Palmer (judge) =

English barrister and judge (1927–2015)

HHJ Henry Palmer
- Born: 13 November 1927
- Died: 27 July 2015 (aged 89)
- Occupations: Barrister, judge
- Known for: Criminal law
- Notable work: Harris's Criminal Law

Robert Henry Stephen Palmer (known as Henry Palmer) (13 November 1927 - 27 July 2015) was an English barrister, judge and legal scholar.

== Early life ==
Palmer was born on 13 November 1927, to parents Henry Alleyne Palmer and Maud (née Obbard) Palmer, coincidentally sharing the same birthday as his father. He was called to the Bar in 1950 by the Inner Temple.

== Career ==
Palmer was appointed as Deputy Chairman of the Berkshire Quarter Sessions in 1970, he served as a Recorder of the Crown Court from 1972 to 1978, and he was appointed as a Circuit Judge in 1978. He was Resident Judge at the Crown Court at Acton from 1987 to 1991, and at the Crown Court at Harrow from 1991 to 1993. Additionally, he served judge of the Mental Health Review Tribunal.

He co-wrote the 19th and 20th editions (1954, 1960) of Harris's Criminal Law with his father.
