= Harris's Criminal Law =

Textbook of English criminal law

Harris's Criminal Law (originally published as Principles of the Criminal Law and also known as Harris and Wilshere's Criminal Law) was a leading textbook on English criminal law published in 22 editions from 1877 to 1973.

== Editions and editors ==
Edition(s)	Year(s)	Editor(s)	Title
1st	1877	Harris, Seymour F.	Principles of the criminal law
2nd	1881	Harris, Seymour F. and Tomlinson, Frederic P.	Principles of the criminal law
3rd	1884	Harris, Seymour F. and Agabeg, Aviet	Principles of the criminal law
4th, 5th	1884, 1889	Agabeg, Aviet	Principles of the criminal law
6th-12th	1892-1912	Attenborough, Charles L.	Principles of the criminal law
13th-18th	1919-1950	Wilshere, Alured M.	Harris and Wilshere's Criminal Law
19th, 20th	1954, 1960	Palmer, H. A. and Palmer, Henry	Harris's Criminal Law
21st	1968	Hooper, Anthony	Harris's Criminal Law
22nd	1973	McLean, Ian and Morrish, Peter	Harris's Criminal Law

== See also ==
- Bibliography of English criminal law
- Kenny's Outlines of Criminal Law
- Smith, Hogan and Ormerod's Criminal Law
