= Raymond L. Brett =

Raymond Laurence Brett
- Born: 10 January 1917
- Died: 6 December 1996 (aged 79)

Academic work
- Discipline: English
- Institutions: University of Hull

Raymond Laurence Brett (10 January 1917 – 6 December 1996) was Professor of English at University of Hull and a friend of Philip Larkin. He produced an edition of Wordsworth and Coleridge's Lyrical Ballads which went through two further editions. Some of his many other publications are listed below.

== Education ==
He attended Bristol Cathedral School and University of Bristol and in 1940 received a B.Litt from University College, Oxford.

== Academic career ==
After working in the Admiralty, from 1940 to 1946, he was a Lecturer in English at the University of Bristol, from 1946 to 1952 and G. F. Grant Professor of English, University of Hull, 1952–1982 and Dean of the Faculty of Arts at the University of Hull from 1960 to 1962.

He held a number of Visiting Professorships: University of Rochester, USA, 1958–1959; Kiel University, University of Osnabrück, 1977; University of Baroda, Jadavpur University, 1978; University of Ottawa, 1981.

He received an Honorary Doctorate of Literature from the University of Hull in 1983.

== Publications ==
- Coleridge's Theory of Imagination, 1949.
- The third earl of Shaftesbury : a study in 18th century literary theory, London : Hutchinson, 1951.
- Crabbe, London : Longman, 1956.
- Reason and imagination : a study of form and meaning in four poems : [Milton's "Lycidas"; Pope's "Essay on man"; Coleridge's "The rime of the ancient mariner"; Eliot's "Four quartets"], London : Oxford University Press for the University of Hull, 1960.
- William Wordsworth and S.T. Coleridge Lyrical ballads edited by R.L. Brett, London : Methuen, 1963.
  - Lyrical ballads; Wordsworth and Coleridge : the text of the 1798 edition with the additional 1800 poems and the Prefaces, London : Routledge, 2nd edition, edited by R.L. Brett with Alun R. Jones 1988, ISBN 0-415-06388-4
  - Lyrical ballads; Wordsworth and Coleridge : the text of the 1798 edition with the additional 1800 poems and the Prefaces, London : Routledge, 1991.
- The English Mind, 1964.
- Poems of faith and doubt, the Victorian age, London : Arnold, 1965.
- Fancy & imagination : a study of Coleridge, London : Methuen, 1969.
- S.T. Coleridge , edited by R.L. Brett (Writers and their Background series), London : Bell, 1971.
- An introduction to English studies, London : Edward Arnold, 1965, new edition 1976.
- Hazlitt, Harlow : Longman, 1977.
- Andrew Marvell: essays on the tercentenary of his death Oxford : Oxford University Press, 1979.
- "Saved from the flames" Times Saturday Review, 18 February 1978: Describes the Journals of Caroline Fox. It was thought that after publication of a selection in 1881, all the manuscripts had been destroyed. This article notes the discovery of the first volume, covering 1832 to 1834, none of which was included in the published selection. A further selection from the journals was published in 1972 and Raymond Brett produced an edition of the journals of Barclay Fox, Caroline's brother in 1979 (See below).
- Fox, Robert Barclay (1979). Barclay Fox's journal; ed. by Raymond Brett. London: Bell and Hyman. ISBN 0-7135-1865-0. and U.S.: Totowa, N.J., Rowman & Littlefield 1979, ISBN 0-8476-6187-3.
- Faith and Doubt: religion and secularisation in literature from Wordsworth to Larkin, James Clarke (1997) ISBN 0-227-67941-5. Part of text only on Google Books but includes portrait. U.S. publication: Macon, Ga. : Mercer University Press, 1997.
- "Philip Larkin at Hull: A Psycho-Literary Sketch. A memoir of Philip Larkin" About Larkin 7 April 1999
