= Somerset Senior Cup =

Annual rugby union knock-out club

- Sport: Rugby Union
- Instituted: 1970; 56 years ago
- Country: England
- Holders: Hornets (2021-22)
- Most titles: Weston-super-Mare (11 titles)
- Website: Somerset RFU

The Somerset Senior Cup is an annual rugby union knock-out club competition organised by the Somerset Rugby Football Union. First contested between 1906-07 and 1913-14, it was reintroduced during the 1970–71 season, with the winners being Bath. It is the most important rugby union cup competition in Somerset, ahead of the Somerset Vase.

The Senior Cup is currently open to club sides based in Somerset and parts of Bristol who play between tier 4 (National League 2 South) and tier 7 (Tribute Western Counties North) of the English rugby union league system. A non-league 2nd XV from the University of Bath has also taken part in the competition in recent years but this is the only 2nd team to take part as the Senior Cup is only open to 1st teams. The format is a knockout cup with a first round, quarter-finals, semi-finals and a final to be held at a neutral venue between March–May.

== Somerset Senior Cup winners ==
Somerset Senior Cup Finals
Season	Winner	Score	Runners–up	Venue
1906–07	Bridgwater Albion	5–0	Bath	Taunton
1907-08	Weston-super-Mare	7–0	Bridgwater	Taunton
1908-09	Bridgwater	9–0	Bath	Weston-super-Mare
1909-10	Bridgwater Albion	13–0	Bridgwater	Bridgwater
1910-11	Weston-super-Mare	3–0	Taunton	Bridgwater
1911-12	Bridgwater Albion	5–0	Weston-super-Mare	Malt Shovel Ground, Bridgwater
1912-13	Weston-super-Mare	12–3	North Petherton	
1913-14	Bridgwater Albion	6–0	Taunton Albion	Weston-super-Mare
1970–71	Bath	13–8	Somerset Police	
1971–72	Bath	13–8	Somerset Police	
1972–73	Bridgwater & Albion	15–9 (aet)	Old Redcliffians	
1973–74	Bath	22–3	Weston-super-Mare	
1974–75	Bath	41–3	Old Redcliffians	
1975–76	Bath	22–7	Weston-super-Mare	
1976–77	Bridgwater & Albion	18–6 (Note: The 1976–77 cup final was won by Bridgwater & Albion after a replay as the first game ended in a tie.)	Old Redcliffians	
1977–78	Avon & Somerset Police	13–10	Combe Down	
1978–79	Weston-super-Mare	14–9	Midsomer Norton	
1979–80	Midsomer Norton	9–6	Bridgwater & Albion	
1980–81	Weston-super-Mare	14–6	Old Redcliffians	
1981–82	Keynsham	6–3	Old Redcliffians	
1982–83	Bath	39–10	Old Redcliffians	
1983–84	Old Redcliffians	22–9	Keynsham	
1984–85	Old Redcliffians	28–9	Gordano	
1985–86	Taunton	22–13	Combe Down	
1986–87	Old Culverhaysians	16–13	Weston-super-Mare	
1987–88	Combe Down	25–12	Old Culverhaysians	Recreation Ground, Bath
1988–89	Taunton	12–10	Combe Down	
1989–90	Midsomer Norton	10–6	Old Redcliffians	
1990–91	Combe Down	13–12	Old Culverhaysians	
1991–92	Bridgwater & Albion	18–7	Weston-super-Mare	
1992–93	Bridgwater & Albion	21–5	Old Redcliffians	
1993–94	Bridgwater & Albion	15–10	Clevedon	
1994–95	Hornets	14–12	Keynsham	
1995–96	Bridgwater & Albion	12–11	Weston-super-Mare	
1996–97	Bridgwater & Albion	26–15	Hornets	
1997–98	Keynsham	36–10	Clevedon	
1998–99	Bridgwater & Albion	27–21	Keynsham	
1999-00	Old Redcliffians	23–6	Gordano	
2000–01	Clevedon	21–20	Bridgwater & Albion	
2001–02	Weston-super-Mare	29–6	Walcot	
2002–03	Weston-super-Mare	41–17	Clevedon	
2003–04	Weston-super-Mare	17–9	Bridgwater & Albion	
2004–05	Bridgwater & Albion	53–0	Clevedon	
2005–06	Bridgwater & Albion	29–20	Hornets	Off North End, Yatton
2006–07	Weston-super-Mare	33–7	Bridgwater & Albion	Athletic Ground, Wellington
2007–08	Taunton	48–18	Clevedon	Recreation Ground, Weston-super-Mare
2008–09	Weston-super-Mare	35–22	Bristol Harlequins	Bristol Road, Keynsham
2009–10	Weston-super-Mare	15–8	Taunton	Bath Road, Bridgwater
2010–11	Weston-super-Mare	41–19	Clevedon	Bath Road, Bridgwater
2011–12	North Petherton	9–9 (aet) (Note: The 2011–12 cup final was won by North Petherton after a penalty shoot out.)	Clevedon	Recreation Ground, Weston-super-Mare
2012–13	Weston-super-Mare	33–22	Old Redcliffians	Bath Road, Bridgwater
2013–14	Old Redcliffians	35–21 (aet)	North Petherton	Recreation Ground, Weston-super-Mare
2014–15	Hornets	30–14	Wells	Bath Road, Bridgwater
2015–16	Hornets	31–27	Weston-super-Mare	Recreation Ground, Weston-super-Mare
2016–17	Weston-super-Mare	33–19	Clevedon	Hutton Moor, Weston-super-Mare
2017–18	Hornets	22–19	University of Bath	Hutton Moor, Weston-super-Mare
2018–19	Taunton Warriors	22–18	North Petherton	Bath Road, Bridgwater
2021-22	Hornets	53-27	Wellington	Bath Road, Bridgwater

== Number of wins ==
- Weston-super-Mare (11)
- Bridgwater & Albion (10)
- Bath (6)
- Hornets (5)
- Old Redcliffians (4)
- Taunton (3) (Note: Taunton have won 4 titles overall – 3 by the 1st XV, 1 by the 2nd XV.)
- Combe Down (2)
- Keynsham (2)
- Midsomer Norton (2)
- Avon & Somerset Police (1)
- Clevedon (1)
- North Petherton (1)
- Old Culverhaysians (1)
- Taunton Warriors (1) (Note: Taunton RFC 2nd XV.)

== See also ==
- Somerset RFU
- Somerset Senior Vase
- English rugby union system
- Rugby union in England
