= Aviet Agabeg =

Armenian-Indian barrister and legal scholar (1844–1920)

- Born: 29 August 1844; Kolkata, India
- Died: 4 September 1920 (aged 76); London, England
- Education: St John's College, Cambridge
- Occupation: Barrister
- Notable work: Harris's Criminal Law
- Spouse: Edith Wynne

Aviet Agabeg (29 August 1844 - 4 September 1920) was an Armenian-Indian barrister and legal scholar. He was one of the first Asian barristers to be called to the bar in England and Wales and the first to be called by the Inner Temple, and he was editor of Harris's Principles of the Criminal Law, which was a leading textbook on English criminal law.

== Early life and education ==
Agabeg was born into the Armenian diaspora in India in Kolkata on 29 August 1844. He was admitted as a pensioner at St John's College, Cambridge on 4 October 1862, and he graduated LL.B. in 1867. He was admitted as a member of the Inner Temple in 1864 and called to the bar in 1868.

== Career ==
Agabeg was a member of the Northern Circuit, practicing from chambers in London. He was noted for being a special pleader and conveyancer who practiced before the High Courts at Kolkata and Yangon.

He was joint editor of Bills of Exchange Act 1882: With Explanatory Notes and Decisions (1883), and editor of the third to fifth editions of Harris's Principles of the Criminal Law (1884–1889).

== Personal life and death ==
Agabeg married the Welsh operatic soprano and concert singer Edith Wynne in 1875. They had two daughters, Isabel Myfanwy, who became a musician in adulthood, and Gwladys Edith Victoria, who died soon after birth in 1878. His wife died on 24 January 1897, aged 54.

He died in London on 4 September 1920.
