= Taunton R.F.C. =

English rugby union club, based in Taunton

Taunton
- Full name: Taunton Rugby Football Club
- Union: Somerset RFU
- Founded: 1875; 151 years ago
- Location: Taunton, Somerset, England
- Ground(s): Summerfield Stadium, Hyde Lane (Capacity: 2,000 (198 seats))
- Chairman: John Wrelton
- President: Neil Symons
- Coach: Tony Yapp
- Captain: Dan Lee
- Top scorer: Nick Mason
- League: National League 2 West
- 2025–26: 4th
Team kit

Official website
- www.tauntonrfc.co.uk

Taunton Rugby Football Club is an English rugby union club based in Taunton, Somerset. The first XV, Taunton Titans, play in National League 2 West (tier 4 of the English rugby union league system), having been relegated from National League 1 at the end of the 2023–24 season. The second XV (The Warriors) play in the Counties 1 Western North. The club also operates the full range of junior teams for both boys and girls.

== History ==
The club was founded in 1875, and play their home matches at Hyde Park, next to the M5 motorway. They moved to Hyde Park in November 2001, having previously played at Priory Park for 66 years. In 2011, they began their partnership with local telecommunications firm, Commsplus. This partnership developed over many years and in October 2017, the Taunton Rugby Club ground at Hyde Park in Taunton was officially renamed the 'Commsplus Stadium'. For the 2019–20 season, the ground will be known as the 'Towergate Stadium' after new sponsors Towergate – an insurance company.

The ground name has changed several more times - from Veritas Park in 2023–24 to the Summerfield Stadium for the 2025-26 season.

== Current standings ==
2026–27 National League 2 West table
| Pos | Team | Pld | W | D | L | PF | PA | PD | TB | LB | Pts | Qualification |
|---|---|---|---|---|---|---|---|---|---|---|---|---|
| 1 | Redruth | 6 | 6 | 0 | 0 | 265 | 121 | +144 | 5 | 0 | 29 | Promotion place |
| 2 | Taunton Titans | 6 | 5 | 0 | 1 | 264 | 132 | +132 | 5 | 1 | 26 | Promotion play-off |
| 3 | Hinckley | 6 | 5 | 0 | 1 | 253 | 108 | +145 | 5 | 0 | 25 | |
| 4 | Luctonians | 6 | 5 | 0 | 1 | 198 | 129 | +69 | 5 | 0 | 25 | |
| 5 | Clifton | 6 | 5 | 0 | 1 | 240 | 189 | +51 | 5 | 0 | 25 | |
| 6 | Lymm | 6 | 4 | 0 | 2 | 198 | 202 | −4 | 5 | 1 | 22 | |
| 7 | Old Redcliffians | 6 | 3 | 0 | 3 | 194 | 188 | +6 | 5 | 1 | 18 | |
| 8 | Cinderford | 6 | 3 | 0 | 3 | 222 | 250 | −28 | 5 | 0 | 17 | |
| 9 | Loughborough Students | 6 | 2 | 0 | 4 | 197 | 236 | −39 | 5 | 1 | 14 | |
| 10 | Hornets | 6 | 1 | 0 | 5 | 180 | 200 | −20 | 4 | 4 | 12 | |
| 11 | Barnstaple | 6 | 2 | 0 | 4 | 139 | 174 | −35 | 2 | 1 | 11 | |
| 12 | Bournville | 6 | 1 | 0 | 5 | 212 | 348 | −136 | 5 | 1 | 10 | Relegation play-off |
| 13 | Devonport Services | 6 | 0 | 0 | 6 | 145 | 294 | −149 | 3 | 1 | 4 | Relegation place |
| 14 | Exeter University | 6 | 0 | 0 | 6 | 140 | 276 | −136 | 2 | 0 | 2 | Relegation place |

Updated to match(es) played on 5 September 2026. Source: National League Rugby
Rules for classification: If teams are level at any stage, tiebreakers are applied in the following order:
1. Number of matches won
2. Number of matches drawn
3. Difference between points for and against
4. Total number of points for
5. Aggregate number of points scored in matches between tied teams
6. Number of matches won excluding the first match, then the second and so on until the tie is settled

== Playing record ==
The team's achievements in 2008–09, when they remained unbeaten, saw them being named 'BBC West Team of the Year'.

In the 2009–10 season, the Taunton 1st XV were champions of National League 3 South West, winning 24 of 26 matches.

In the 2010–11 season, the Taunton 1st XV finished in 7th position in their first season in National League 2 South.

== Honours ==
1st team (Titans):

- Somerset Senior Cup winners (3): 1986, 1989, 2008
- Tribute Western Counties (north v west) promotion play-off winner: 2000–01
- Western Counties North champions: 2004–05
- South West 2 West champions: 2008–09
- National League 3 South West champions: 2009–10
- National League 2 South champions: 2019–20

2nd team (Warriors):

- Somerset 2 South champions: 2007–08
- Somerset Senior Cup winners: 2019

3rd team (Wanderers):

- Somerset 3 South champions (2): 2007–08, 2017–18
- Somerset 2 South champions: 2018–19
- Notes:

== M5 motorway crash ==
On the evening of 4 November 2011 seven people were killed and fifty one injured in a multi-vehicle accident on the M5 south of the area where Taunton RFC were holding a fireworks display. Police said that they were investigating whether smoke from the event had been a significant factor in the accident. Taunton Rugby Club management committee issued a statement regarding the crash on 7 November 2011. On 13 December 2011, it was reported that the Highways Agency advised that fog warning systems be upgraded 18 months before the crash.

On 19 October 2012, Geoffrey Counsell, the provider of a fireworks display, was charged with seven counts of manslaughter. At the 15 January hearing the manslaughter charges against Counsell were dropped. He will instead face a single charge of failing to ensure the safety of others, under health and safety laws. On 9 April he entered a not guilty plea and was bailed.

On 10 December 2013, Geoffrey Counsell was cleared of the blame for the firework deaths. He had denied the charge of failing to ensure public safety for the Taunton Rugby Club display. A judge at Bristol Crown Court directed the jury to find him not guilty. Speaking outside court, Mr Counsell said he believed the decision to prosecute him was "motivated by a desire to find someone to blame for this terrible accident, simply for the sake of doing so". The Crown Prosecution Service (CPS) said it sought evidence from experts and eyewitnesses before making the decision to charge Mr Counsell. The pile-up involved about 30 cars when they were engulfed by a thick fog on the M5 on 4 November 2011. The court had previously been told the smog was so thick that motorists on the northbound carriageway likened it to having a tin of paint thrown over their windscreens. Mr Justice Simon ruled Mr Counsell had "no case to answer" following an application from the defendant's barrister at the halfway point in the trial. He said the prosecution's case was "heavily weighted" on "hindsight" and there was not sufficient evidence to show that Mr Counsell ought to have foreseen that smoke from the display could have drifted and mixed with fog to create thick smog. "I have therefore concluded that the evidence is such that the jury cannot continue in these circumstances and it is my duty to stop the trial and order an acquittal," he added.

Mr Counsell, who ran Firestorm Pyrotechnics, was the contractor hired by Taunton Rugby Club to run the £3,000 display, which was watched by about 1,000 people. He set off 1,500 shots in 15 minutes – just 200 yards from the motorway.
