= George Bennett (rugby) =

Wales international rugby league & union footballer

Personal information
- Full name: George Henry Bennett
- Born: 8 July 1913 Forden, Montgomeryshire, Wales
- Died: 31 August 1970 (aged 57)

Playing information

Rugby union
Club
Years	Team	Pld	T	G	FG	P
1927–30	Risca
1929–30	Weston-super-Mare
	Total	0	0	0	0	0

Rugby league
- Position: Centre, Stand-off, Scrum-half
Club
Years	Team	Pld	T	G	FG	P
1930–37	Wigan	232	101	5		313
1937–≥45	Bradford Northern	151
194?–4?	→Castleford (guest)	0	0	0	0	0
	Total	383	101	5	0	313
Representative
Years	Team	Pld	T	G	FG	P
1935–36	Wales	3	2	0	0	6

George Henry Bennett (8 July 1913 – 31 August 1970) was a Welsh rugby union, and professional rugby league footballer who played in the 1920s, 1930s and 1940s. He played club level rugby union (RU) for Weston-super-Mare RFC, and representative level rugby league (RL) for Wales, and at club level for Wigan, Bradford Northern and Castleford (as a wartime guest) as a centre, stand-off, or scrum-half.

== Background ==
Bennett was born in Forden, Montgomeryshire, and he died aged 57.

== Rugby union career ==
Bennett started his career as a rugby union player, joining Weston-super-Mare in 1929. He left Wales due to the racism of the Welsh Rugby Union preventing him from playing for the national team, and signed for rugby league side Wigan in November 1930.

== Rugby league career ==
=== Wigan ===
Bennett played stand-off in Wigan's 15–3 victory over Salford in the Championship Final during the 1933–34 season at Wilderspool Stadium, Warrington on Saturday 28 April 1934. He also played stand-off in Wigan's 30–27 victory over France at Central Park, Wigan, on Saturday 10 March 1934. Bennett played at centre and scored a try in Wigan's 12–21 defeat by Salford in the 1934–35 Lancashire Cup Final during the 1934–35 season at Station Road, Swinton on Saturday 20 October 1934. In December 1937, after losing his place as a first team regular, he joined Bradford Northern.

=== Bradford Northern ===
Bennett played 151 games for Bradford, including the final of the 1944 Challenge Cup victory over Wigan.

=== International honours ===
Bennett won three caps for Wales (RL) in 1935–1936 while at Wigan, becoming the first black man to represent a British national team at rugby league. In 1936 he was to tour Australia with the England team but was omitted to "avoid criticism" due to the colour of his skin.

== Notes ==
George Bennet's surname is variously spelt with two T's as Bennett, or with a single T as Bennet.
