= Edith Wynne =

Welsh operatic soprano (1842–1897)

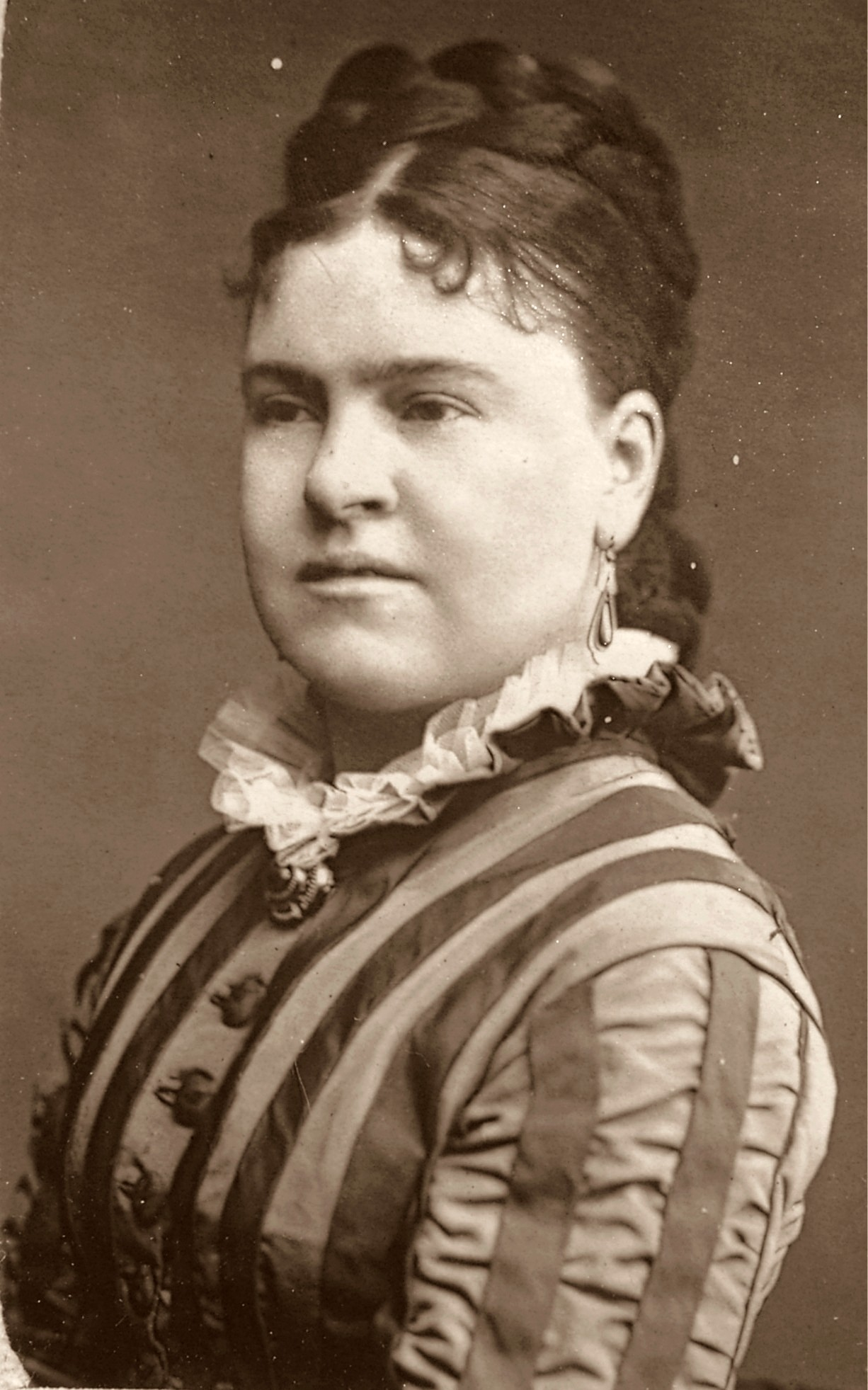
- Sarah Edith Wynne, aka "Eos Cymru"
- Born: 11 March 1842; Holywell, Flintshire, Wales
- Died: 24 January 1897 (aged 54)
- Other names: Eos Cymru
- Occupations: Singer, voice teacher
- Spouse: Aviet Agabeg

Sarah Edith Wynne (Eos Cymru) (11 March 1842 – 24 January 1897) was a Welsh operatic soprano and concert singer.

== Early life ==
Wynne was born in Holywell, Flintshire, the third daughter of Robert Wynne and Harriet Davies Wynne. Her father was a tailor. She toured in Wales at age 12 as a singer. She studied singing with Richard Scarisbrick in Liverpool and Pinsuti at the Royal Academy of Music, where she was Westmoreland Scholar from 1863 to 1864. She subsequently studied with Romani and Vannuccini in Florence.

Her brothers Robert, Richard, and Llew Wynne, and her older sister Kate Wynne Matthison, were also singers. Actress Edith Wynne Matthison was her niece and namesake.

== Career ==
Her first appearances were in provincial concert halls and theatres. She made her London debut in June 1862 at concerts organized by Ellis Roberts, and sang soon after, on 4 July 1862 at St. James's Hall, in John Thomas's Welsh concert. Wynne sang in the United States with the Janet and John Patey and Charles Santley in 1871-1872, and at the Boston Handel Festival of 1874. She also appeared in opera at The Crystal Palace between 1869 and 1871 as Arline in Wallace's Maritana and as Lady Edith in Randegger's Rival Beauties, but she was chiefly noted for her singing of art song and ballads, and her appearances at the Reid Concerts in Edinburgh.

After her marriage in 1875 she increasingly devoted herself to teaching oratorio and ballad singing. She last sang in London in 1894.

== Personal life ==
She married a Cambridge-educated Armenian barrister, Aviet Agabeg, in 1875. They had two daughters, Isabel Myfanwy, who became a musician in adulthood, and Gwladys Edith Victoria, who died soon after birth in 1878. Sarah Edith Wynne Agabeg died at her home in London on 24 January 1897, aged 54 years, and was buried in Hampstead Cemetery.
