= Weston-super-Mare RFC =

English rugby union team, based in Somerset

Weston-super-Mare
- Full name: Weston-super-Mare Rugby Football Club
- Union: Somerset RFU
- Founded: 1875; 151 years ago
- Location: Weston-super-Mare, Somerset, England
- Ground(s): Recreation Ground, Drove Road (Capacity: 3,000)
- Chairman: Barry Sparks
- President: John Brentnall
- Coach(es): Darren Crompton, Dan Lomax
- Captain: Tom Sugg
- Most caps: Ash Russell (452)
- Top scorer: Robbie Hazzard
- League: Regional 2 South West
- 2025–26: 1st (promoted to Regional 1 South West)

Official website
- www.westonrugby.co.uk

Weston-super-Mare Rugby Football Club is an English rugby union team based in Weston-super-Mare, Somerset. The club runs five senior teams, including a colts and veterans side and the full range of junior teams The first XV play in Regional 1 South West, a level five league in the English rugby union system, following their promotion from Regional 2 South West in 2026.

The second XV (United) play in the Tribute Somerset Premier and the third XV (Athletic) play in Tribute Somerset 2 North.

== History ==
The club was formed in 1875 and played their early games on what is now a supermarket car park before moving to their present ground at Drove Road in 1880. The Great Depression saw people from Wales arriving in the town, played rugby for Weston and became one of the top clubs in the country at that time. Recently they have had a resurgence in player attendance, overall improvement in facilities and a thriving social scene which has equated to success on the field.

Weston-super-Mare are one of two rugby clubs in the town, the other being Hornets RFC.

== Ground ==
The club are based at the Recreation Ground in the centre of town, having played there since 1880. Access to the ground is good, being just off the A370 and across the road from Weston-super-Mare railway station. Facilities include a club house, on site parking, with a seated grandstand and covered terracing on both sides of the main pitch. There are also several full size rugby pitches on adjutant land. The ground capacity has been historically listed as 6,000 and early games have been reported of 4,000 spectators attending, but a figure of 3,000 is more realistic with modern crowd safety measures in mind.

In 2021 talks began with the club, North Somerset Council and Atlas HIVE to redevelop the ground, which include a new club house, gym, 260 seat grandstand and upgraded parking facilities, as well a health centre and 182 apartments surrounded the ground. In 2022 planning permission was given and an plan for redevelopment to be completed by 2028.

== Honours ==
1st team:

- Somerset Senior Cup winners (11): 1979, 1981, 2002, 2003, 2004, 2007, 2009, 2010, 2011, 2013, 2017
- South West 1 champions: 2001–02
- Somerset Division 3 South champions: 2008–09
- South West 1 West champions: 2016–17
- Bristol Combination Cup winners: 2019
- Regional 2 South West winners: 2025–26

2nd team:

- Somerset 2 South champions: 2008–09

3rd team:

- Somerset 3 South champions: 2008–09

4th team:

- Somerset 3 South champions: 2016–17

== International players ==
Eight former players have gone on to win international caps.

- (England) 1882–84 E L Strong
- (Wales) 1885–91 W H Thomas
- (Wales) (RL) 1935 George Bennett
- (Wales) 1939 R E Price
- (England) 1967–73 Peter Larter
- (England) 1970 G F Redmond
- (England) 1984–97 Nigel Redman
- (Republic of Ireland) 2010 Dan Tuohy
- (Scotland) 2011 Jack Cuthbert
