= Ian McLean (judge) =

English barrister and judge (1928–2016)

HHJ Ian McLean
- Born: 7 September 1928
- Died: 8 March 2016 (aged 87)
- Education: Christ's College, Cambridge
- Occupations: Barrister, judge, legal scholar
- Known for: Criminal law
- Notable work: Harris's Criminal Law
- Military career
- Allegiance: United Kingdom
- Branch: British Army
- Unit: Intelligence Corps

Ian Graeme McLean (7 September 1928 – 8 March 2016) was an English barrister, judge, and author of legal works.

== Early life and education ==
McLean was born in Edinburgh on 7 September 1928. He was schooled at Aldenham School and served in the Intelligence Corps from 1946 to 1948. He went up to Christ’s College, Cambridge, graduating B.A. (Hons) in law in 1950 (proceeding to M.A. by seniority in 1955).

He was called to the Bar by the Middle Temple in 1951.

== Career ==
From 1951 to 1955, McLean practised law in London and on the Western Circuit.

He served as Crown Counsel in the Northern Region of the Federation of Colonial Nigeria from 1955 until 1959. Then, from 1959 to 1962, during the pivotal period of Nigerian Independence, he served as both Senior Lecturer and Head of the Legal Department of the Institute of Administration at Zaria and as Native Courts Adviser overseeing the implementation of the Settlement of 1960, a major overhaul of the Northern Region's judicial system that integrated Islamic, customary, and statutory laws.

McLean returned to the English Bar in 1962 and practised on the London and South Eastern Circuit. He was appointed as one of the first Immigration Adjudicators in 1969, a Metropolitan Stipendiary Magistrate in 1970 and a Circuit Judge in 1980. He retired in 1997.

He published widely during his career, including:

- Criminal Law Procedure and Evidence of Lagos, Eastern and Western Nigeria (1963).
- Cases on the Criminal Law, Procedure and Evidence of Nigeria (excluding the North) (1966).
- A Practical Guide to Appeals in Criminal Courts (1971).
- Harris's Criminal Law (1973).
- Trial of Breathalyser Offences: A Practitioner's Index of Practice and Procedure (1st-3rd edns) (1975, 1987, 1990).
- A Pattern of Sentencing (1981).
- Criminal Appeals: A Practical Guide to Appeals to and from The Crown Court (1989).
- Fact-Finding for Magistrates (1990).
- Magistrates' Courts Index (1st-13 edns) (1973–2003).
- Crown Court Index (1st-35th edns) (1972–2015).

He was also a contributor to Archbold Criminal Pleading, Evidence and Practice and the Criminal Law title of the 4th issue of Halsbury's Laws of England.

== Personal life and death ==
McLean married Eleonore Maria Gmeiner in 1957 and had two daughters (Elisabeth and the late Fiona). He died on 8 March 2016, aged 87, and was survived by Eleonore, Elisabeth, and his grandchildren and great-grandchildren.
