= Charles Leete Attenborough =

English barrister and judge (1853–1937)

- Born: 12 January 1853
- Died: 7 March 1937 (aged 84)
- Notable work: Harris's Criminal Law

Charles Leete Attenborough (12 January 1853 - 6 March 1937) was an English solicitor and barrister, judge, and legal scholar.

Attenborough was admitted as a solicitor in 1875 and then called to the bar by Inner Temple in 1891. He practiced on the Midland Circuit from chambers in the Temple, London. From 1892 to 1912 he wrote the sixth to twelfth editions of Harris's Principles of the Criminal Law. He was an alderman of Middlesex and chairman of the county licensing committee, and from 1918 to 1936 he was the Recorder of Great Grimsby.
