= Seymour Frederick Harris =

English barrister, legal scholar and Anglican clergyman (1851–1920)

The Reverend Seymour Frederick Harris
- Born: 18 April 1851
- Died: 1920 (aged 68–69)
- Education: Worcester College, Oxford
- Occupations: Barrister, Anglican clergyman
- Notable work: Harris's Criminal Law

Seymour Frederick Harris (18 April 1851 - 1920) was an English barrister, legal scholar and Anglican clergyman. He was the original author of Principles of the Criminal Law (1877), later widely known as Harris's Criminal Law, a leading textbook on English criminal law.

== Early life and education ==
Harris was born on 18 April 1851, the second son of Rev. James Harris, a Wesleyan minister of Ormskirk, Lancashire. He passed the University of London Matriculation Examination in 1869, and went up to Worcester College, Oxford graduating B.A. and B.C.L. (later proceeding to M.A. by seniority).

He was admitted to the Inner Temple in 1872 and called to the bar in the trinity term of 1875.

== Career ==
=== Law ===
Harris joined the Northern Circuit and practiced before the sessions at Liverpool, Kirkdale and Preston. He wrote two legal texts: The Elements of Roman Law Summarized (1875); and the first three editions of Principles of the Criminal Law (1877, 1881, 1884).

=== Clergy ===
Harris's legal practice was brief. Although he remained on the Bar roll into the early twentieth century, he entered Anglican holy orders, becoming vicar of St Michael & All Hallows (also styled St Michael & All Angels), Blackburn from 1884 until his death. He wrote two further books: Earnest Young Heroes (1896); and A Century of Missionary Martyrs (1897).

== Personal life and death ==
Harris married Mary Elinor Barber, daughter of William Barber QC (a Chancery barrister and Bencher of Lincoln's Inn). They had two children.

He died in 1920.
