= St Katherine's School =

Location
- Ham Green; Pill, Somerset, BS20 0HU; England
- 51.4741°N 2.6767°W

Information
- Type: Academy
- Local authority: North Somerset
- Trust: Cathedral Schools Trust
- Department for Education URN: 142853 Tables
- Ofsted: Reports
- Gender: Co-educational
- Age: 11 to 18
- Houses: Stephenson (Red), Pankhurst (Green), Turing (Blue), Yousafzai (Yellow).
- Colour: Burgundy
- Website: www.stkaths.org.uk/

St Katherine's School is a co-educational secondary school and sixth form located in the English county of Somerset. Commonly known to be located in Pill, the school is actually located in the neighbouring civil parish of Abbots Leigh.

== History ==
Previously a community school administered by North Somerset Council, in June 2016 St Katherine's School converted to academy status and is now sponsored by the Cathedral Schools Trust.

== Curriculum ==
St Katherine's School offers GCSEs, Cambridge Nationals and Level 2 BTECs as programmes of study for pupils, while students in the sixth form have the option to study from a range of A-levels, Cambridge Technicals and Level 3 BTECs.

== Notable former pupils ==
- Beth Gibbons, lead singer of Portishead
- Amelie Morgan, Olympic gymnast

== Former teachers ==
Paul Kent, played rugby for Somerset, brother of Charles Kent (rugby union)
