= Lockleaze =

Area of Bristol, England

Coordinates: 51.4901°N 2.5608°W

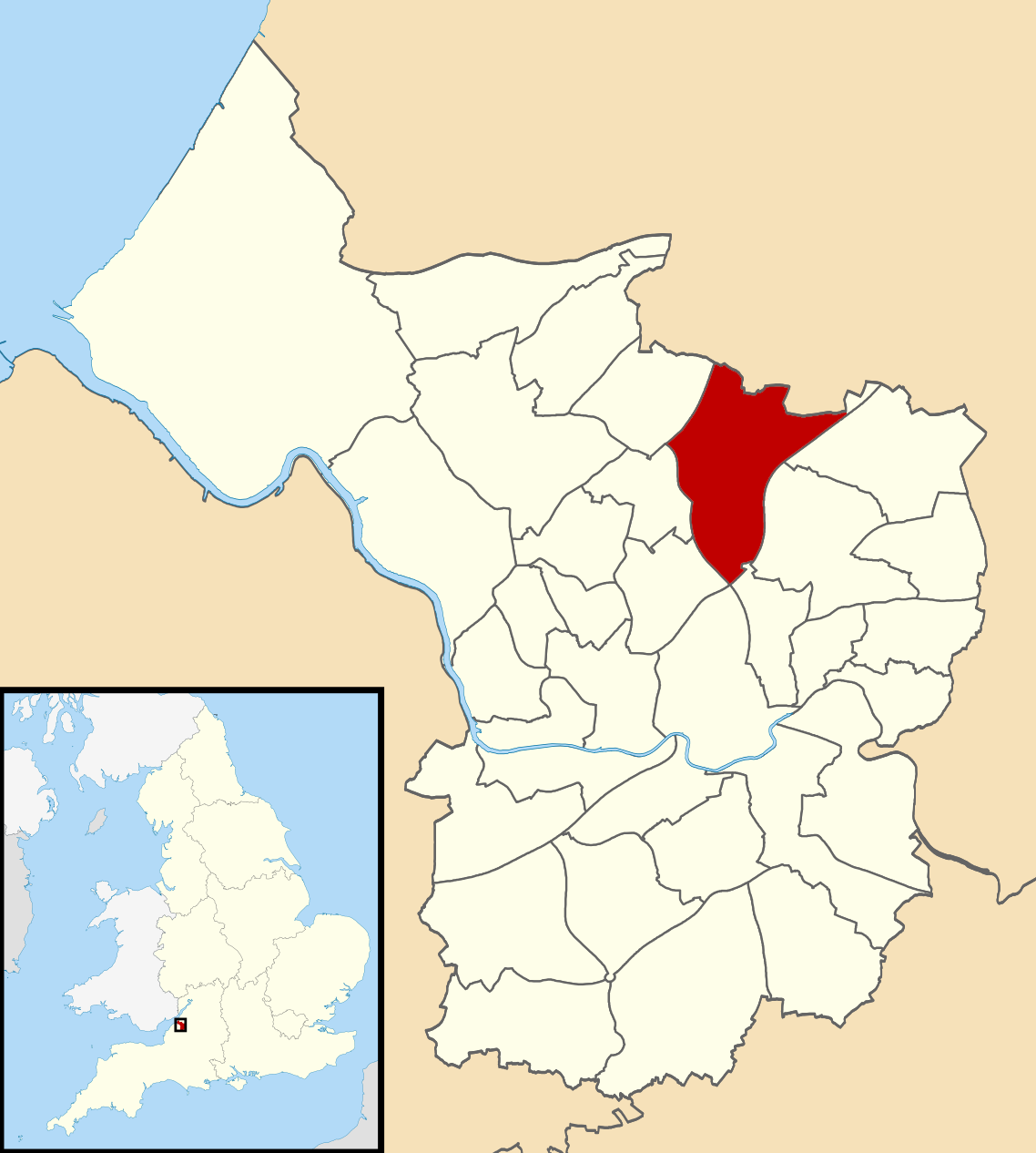
- Boundaries of the city council ward since 2016
- Population: 12,080 (2011.Ward)
- OS grid reference: ST611769
- Unitary authority: Bristol
- Ceremonial county: Bristol
- Region: South West
- Country: England
- Sovereign state: United Kingdom
- Post town: BRISTOL
- Postcode district: BS7
- Dialling code: 0117
- Police: Avon and Somerset
- Fire: Avon
- Ambulance: South Western
- UK Parliament: Bristol North East

Lockleaze is an area and council ward in the northern suburbs of the city of Bristol, England, 3 miles (5 km) north of the city centre, south of Filton, east of Horfield and west of Frenchay.

Lockleaze is a residential area of social housing built on the western flank of Purdown on a north–south axis, that was initially separated from Horfield by the main Bristol to South Wales railway line. The suburb was developed immediately after World War II. Although much of the housing was owned by Bristol Corporation, some are now privately owned. The Lockleaze council ward was extended to include older Bristol council housing and the border with Horfield is the thoroughfare, Filton Avenue.

Lockleaze School was designed by the city architect A.H. Clarke and built in 1954. It is an early example of 'Method Building' using pre-cast frame with pre-stressed floors and brick panel walling. The school closed in July 2004. Trinity Academy has since been built in Lockleaze to replace it. The site of the original school has now been replaced with housing.

St Mary's Church dates from 1956 by T.H.B. Burrough.

A microwave transmission tower, Purdown BT Tower, is located at Lockleaze and is known locally as the "Cups and Saucers". The distinctive tower, built in 1970, can be seen from many miles away.

During World War II, an anti-aircraft gun emplacement, known locally as Purdown Purcy, was located on the down, the ruins of which remain today.

== History ==
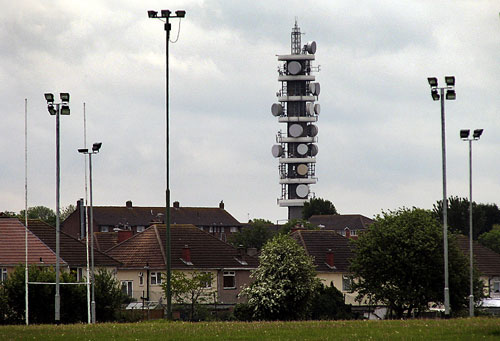
The Purdown BT Tower dominates much of Lockleaze

The estate takes its name from Lockleaze Farm, which occupied the site. The name Lock Leaze comes from the Anglo-Saxon for a fold in a field or pasture. Lockleaze Farm stood roughly where Bonnington Walk is today, between Stothard Road, Branwhite Close and Thornycroft Close. The farm stood at the end of Lockleaze Lane; neither the lane nor the farm buildings remain today. Lockleaze Lane was a continuation of Berry Lane, which began at the junction between Gloucester Road and the present-day Muller Road, at Horfield Court Farm. The lane followed the route of Muller Road, Filton Avenue, Berry Lane and Chedworth Road, before crossing the gas works and crossing the railway at the present day Constable Road/Lockleaze Road bridge. On the south side of Chedworth Road stood Berry Lane Farm. As well as Lockleaze Farm there was also Purdown Farm which stands at the site of present-day Fairacre Close. The old farmhouse remained long after the houses were built at Haydon Gardens.

Nearly all the roads in Lockleaze are named after painters, such as Constable, Gainsborough, Blake, Hogarth and Nash. A new development situated off Bonnington Walk was built using experimatal modular housing developed by Legal & General. These were since bought by local housing associations.

== Amenities ==
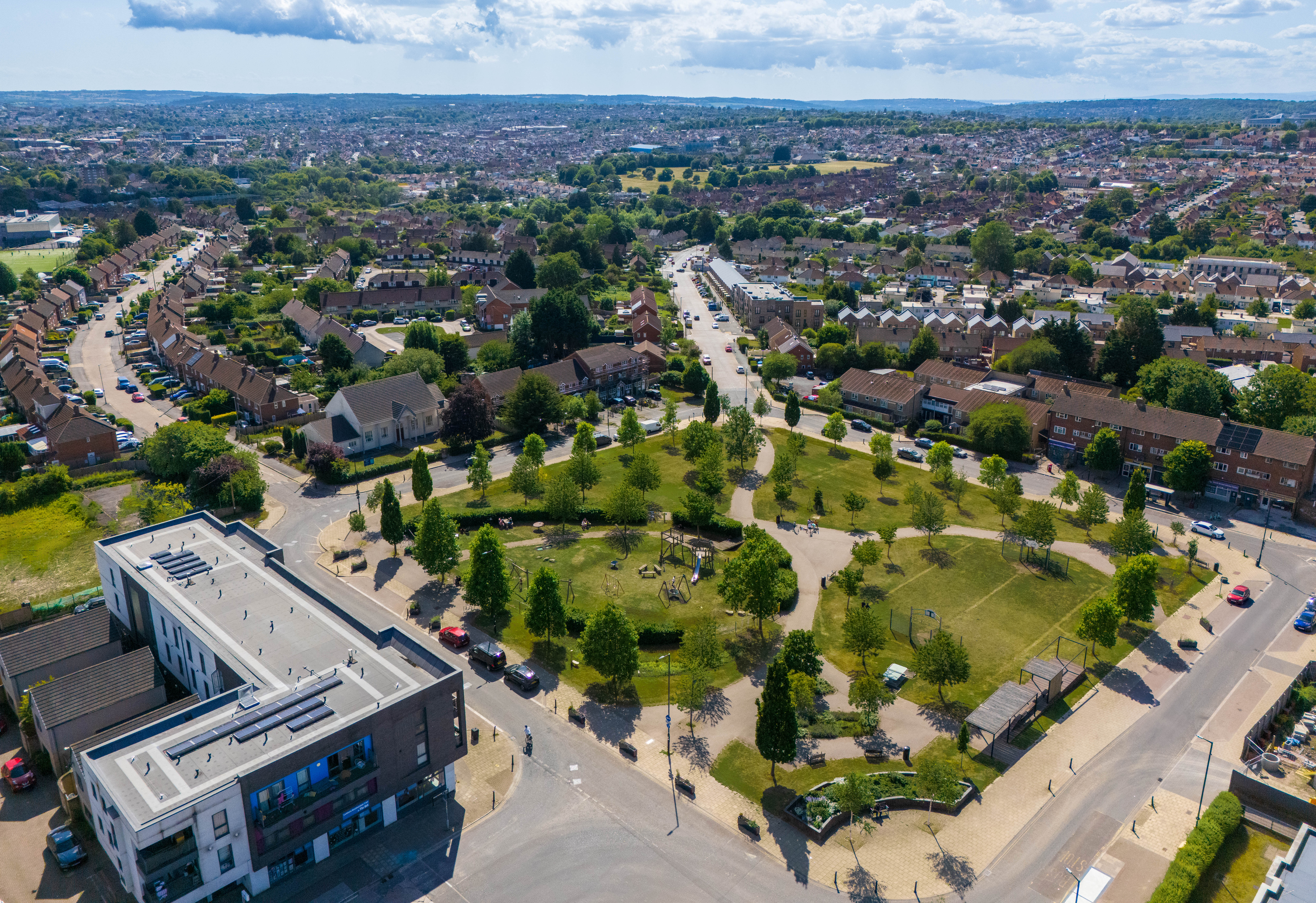
Gainsborough Square, Lockleaze.

The hub of Lockleaze is Gainsborough Square, where shops face onto the north and west sides of the Square.

On the east side of the Square, a new community centre has been built, named The Hub. At the south side of the Square is the Church of St. Mary Magdalene with St. Francishe. The central green area of Gainsborough Square serves as a small park, with an enclosed child's play area.

The nearest police station is on Southmead Road, in the neighbouring district of Southmead. Lockleaze once had its own police station on Gainsborough Square.

A doctor's surgery is located on Lockleaze Road.

Lockleaze is served by a bus service operated by First West of England, with several bus stops throughout Lockleaze.

== Famous people ==
- Boxer Lee Haskins was born in Lockleaze
- Robin Boardman-Pattison, a senior Extinction Rebellion personality known for storming off a Sky News interview, lived in Lockleaze

== In popular culture ==
The Channel 4 sitcom Teachers was filmed at Lockleaze school. Lockleaze provided a backdrop in the 1962 film Some People directed by Clive Donner, starring Kenneth More, Angela Douglas and Ray Brooks. The film is about a youth worker (Kenneth More) trying to help a group of teenagers in Bristol. In the film, several Lockleaze landmarks were shown, including Purdown, the communication tower and the large gas holders which once stood just off Lockleaze Road. Lockleaze was also the setting for the series finale of BBC Three's 2016 drama miniseries Thirteen, starring Jodie Comer.
