= 2013–14 National League 2 South =

Rugby union competition in England

- Countries: England
- Champions: Hartpury College
- Runners-up: Ampthill (not promoted)
- Relegated: Exmouth, Bournemouth, London Irish Wild Geese
- Matches played: 240
- Attendance: 79,628 (average 332 per match)
- Highest attendance: 1,905; Shelford v Cambridge; 12 April 2014
- Lowest attendance: 80; Clifton v Southend Saxons; 8 February 2014
- Top point scorer: (England) Elliot Clements-Hill (Ampthill); 366 points
- Top try scorer: (England) Dean Adamson (Ampthill); 24 tries

The 2013–14 National League 2 South was the fifth season (27th overall) of the fourth tier (south) of the English domestic rugby union competitions since the professionalised format of the second division was introduced. The league system was 4 points for a win, 2 points for a draw and additional bonus points being awarded for scoring 4 or more tries and/or losing within 7 points of the victorious team. In terms of promotion the league champions would go straight up into National League 1 while the runners up would have a one-game playoff against the runners up from National League 2 North (at the home ground of the club with the superior league record) for the final promotion place. After an absence of several years, the Cornwall Super Cup returned in a new format with the two league matches between the Cornish sides Launceston and Redruth also counting towards the cup.

Hartpury College, as champions, were promoted to the third tier (2014–15 National League 1) for next season. League runners-up, Ampthill, lost the annual play–off against the 2013–14 National League 2 North runners up, Darlington Mowden Park 30 – 28. London Irish Wild Geese were demoted to National League 3 London & SE, and Bournemouth and Exmouth were both relegated to National League 3 South West. Finally, the Cornish Super Cup was won by Launceston who defeated Redruth via an aggregate score of 39 - 28.

== Participating teams ==
Eleven of the teams listed below participated in the 2012–13 National League 2 South season. Cambridge were relegated from National League 1; London Irish and Exmouth were promoted from National League 3 South West; Bishop's Stortford were promoted from National League 3 London & SE; Ampthill were promoted from National League 3 Midlands and were then level transferred from National League 2 North (where they would normally have expected to play) due to an imbalance in the number of teams in the two fourth tier leagues.

Locations of the 2013–14 National League 2 South teams

Team	Ground	Capacity	Location
Ampthill	Dillingham Park	3,000	Ampthill, Bedfordshire
Bishop's Stortford	Silver Leys	1,600	Bishop's Stortford, Hertfordshire
Bournemouth	Chapel Gate	1,500	Bournemouth, Dorset
Cambridge	Grantchester Road	2,200 (200 seats)	Cambridge, Cambridgeshire
Canterbury	Merton Lane	1,500 (75 seats)	Canterbury, Kent
Chinnor	Kingsey Road	2,000	Thame, Oxfordshire
Clifton	Station Road	2,200 (200 seats)	Cribbs Causeway, Patchway, Bristol
Dings Crusaders	Landseer Avenue	1,500	Lockleaze, Bristol
Exmouth	Imperial Recreation Ground	1,250 (250 stand)	Exmouth, Devon
Hartpury College	College Stadium	2,000	Hartpury, Gloucestershire
Launceston	Polson Bridge	3,000	Launceston, Cornwall
London Irish Wild Geese	The Avenue	6,600	Sunbury-on-Thames, Surrey
Redruth	The Recreation Ground	3,500 (580 seats)	Redruth, Cornwall
Shelford	The Davey Field	2,000 (150 seats)	Great Shelford, Cambridgeshire
Southend Saxons	Warners Park	1,500 (150 seats)	Southend, Essex
Taunton	Hyde Park, Bathpool	2,000 (198 seats)	Taunton, Somerset

== League table ==
2013–14 National League 2 South table
Pos	Team	Pld	W	D	L	PF	PA	PD	TB	LB	Pts	Qualification
1	Hartpury College (C)	30	23	0	7	1019	666	+353	22	3	117	Promoted
2	Ampthill & District	30	21	1	8	1053	631	+422	20	3	109	Promotion play-offs
3	Bishop's Stortford	30	18	2	10	841	687	+154	19	7	102	
4	Canterbury	30	19	0	11	781	715	+66	18	6	100	
5	Clifton	30	18	0	12	739	702	+37	11	3	86	
6	Taunton Titans	30	17	1	12	785	718	+67	10	6	86	
7	Cambridge	30	16	0	14	749	668	+81	14	7	85	
8	Southend	30	15	0	15	735	740	−5	12	8	80	
9	Redruth	30	13	1	16	641	759	−118	13	5	72	
10	Shelford	30	13	2	15	646	664	−18	6	7	69	
11	Dings Crusaders	30	12	0	18	679	745	−66	10	10	68	
12	Launceston	30	15	0	15	605	730	−125	4	2	66	
13	Chinnor	30	12	0	18	676	775	−99	8	9	65	
14	London Irish Wild Geese (R)	30	11	0	19	754	808	−54	11	8	63	Relegated
15	Bournemouth (R)	30	8	1	21	670	996	−326	10	5	49	Relegated
16	Exmouth (R)	30	5	0	25	591	960	−369	7	7	34	Relegated

Updated to match(es) played on 1 May 2014. Source: RFU
Rules for classification: If teams are level at any stage, tiebreakers are applied in the following order:
1. Number of matches won
2. Difference between points for and against
3. Total number of points for
4. Aggregate number of points scored in matches between tied teams
5. Number of matches won excluding the first match, then the second and so on until the tie is settled
  (C) Champion; (R) Relegated

== Results ==
=== Round 1 ===
7 September 2013
14:30

(BP) Bournemouth	42 – 21	Taunton Titans
	Report

Chapel Gate
Attendance: 350
Referee: Alex Manley

7 September 2013
14:30

(2BP) Canterbury	30 – 32	Clifton (BP)
	Report

Merton Lane
Attendance: 200
Referee: Veryan Boscawen

7 September 2013
14:30

(BP) Exmouth	3 – 9	Chinnor
	Report

Imperial Recreation Ground
Attendance: 300
Referee: Fergus Kirby

7 September 2013
14:30

(BP) Dings Crusaders	26 – 32	Southend Saxons (BP)
	Report

Landseer Avenue
Attendance: 110
Referee: Paul Kimber

7 September 2013
14:30

(BP) Hartpury College	37 – 13	Bishop's Stortford
	Report

College Stadium
Attendance: 175
Referee: Tom Davis

7 September 2013
15:00

Shelford	21 – 9	Launceston
	Report

The Davey Field
Attendance: 249
Referee: Craig Maxwell Keys

7 September 2013
15:00

(BP) Redruth	27 – 35	Cambridge (BP)
	Report

The Recreation Ground
Attendance: 621
Referee: Phil Watters

7 September 2013
16:30

London Irish Wild Geese	10 – 37	Ampthill (BP)
	Report

Hazelwood
Attendance: 250
Referee: John Ibbotson

=== Round 2 ===
14 September 2013
14:30

(BP) Bournemouth	45 – 25	London Irish Wild Geese (BP)
	Report

Chapel Gate
Attendance: 300
Referee: Philip Davies

14 September 2013
14:30

Clifton	29 – 23	Hartpury College
	Report

Station Road
Attendance: 200
Referee: Phil Watters

14 September 2013
15:00

Bishop's Stortford	28 – 28	Ampthill
	Report

Silver Leys
Attendance: 220
Referee: Brendan Fitzmaurice

14 September 2013
15:00

(BP) Cambridge	24 – 14	Canterbury
	Report

Grantchester Road
Attendance: 450
Referee: Paul Kimber

14 September 2013
15:00

(BP) Chinnor	42 – 17	Dings Crusaders
	Report

Kingsey Road
Attendance: 250
Referee: Max Marsden

14 September 2013
15:00

(BP) Launceston	31 – 10 (Note: First leg of 2013-14 Cornish Super Cup.)	Redruth
	Report

Polson Bridge
Attendance: 1,650
Referee: Fergus Kirby

14 September 2013
15:00

Southend Saxons	17 – 13	Shelford (BP)
	Report

Warners Bridge Park
Attendance: 150
Referee: Luke Haskins

14 September 2013
15:00

(BP) Taunton Titans	61 – 23	Exmouth (BP)
	Report

Hyde Park
Attendance: 356
Referee: Nick Williams

=== Round 3 ===
21 September 2013
14:30

Dings Crusaders	24 – 17	Taunton Titans (BP)
	Report

Landseer Avenue
Attendance: 415
Referee: James Sullivan

21 September 2013
14:30

(BP) Exmouth	33 – 18	Bournemouth
	Report

Imperial Recreation Ground
Attendance: 167
Referee: Shane Lewis

21 September 2013
15:00

(BP) Canterbury	35 – 25	Launceston
	Report

Merton Lane
Attendance: 140
Referee: Alex Manley

21 September 2013
14:30

Hartpury College	19 – 13	Cambridge (BP)
	Report

College Stadium
Attendance: 230
Referee: Matthew O'Grady

21 September 2013
15:00

(BP) Shelford	19 – 24	Chinnor
	Report

The Davey Field
Attendance: 225
Referee: Stephen Light

21 September 2013
15:00

Ampthill	20 – 37	Clifton
	Report

Dillingham Park
Attendance: 175
Referee: Max Marsden

21 September 2013
15:00

(2BP) London Irish Wild Geese	35 – 37	Bishop's Stortford (BP)
	Report

Hazelwood
Attendance: 300
Referee: Veryan Boscawen

21 September 2013
15:00

(BP) Redruth	38 – 7	Southend Saxons
	Report

The Recreation Ground
Attendance: 635
Referee: Richard Kelly

=== Round 4 ===
28 September 2013
14:30

Clifton	21 – 19	Bishop's Stortford (BP)
	Report

Station Road
Attendance: 450
Referee: Guy Steel Bodger

28 September 2013
14:30

(BP) Bournemouth	37 – 36	Dings Crusaders (2BP)
	Report

Chapel Gate
Attendance: 300
Referee: Veryan Boscawen

28 September 2013
14:30

Exmouth	19 – 16	London Irish Wild Geese (BP)
	Report

Imperial Recreation Ground
Attendance: 175
Referee: Nick Williams

28 September 2013
15:00

Cambridge	15 – 25	Ampthill
	Report

Grantchester Road
Attendance: 430
Referee: Alex Manley

28 September 2013
15:00

Chinnor	27 – 15	Redruth
	Report

Kingsey Road
Attendance: 482
Referee: Gareth Holsgrove

28 September 2013
15:00

Launceston	21 – 18	Hartpury College (BP)
	Report

Polson Bridge
Attendance: 687
Referee: Luke Haskins

28 September 2013
15:00

Southend Saxons	34 – 27	Canterbury (2BP)
	Report

Warners Bridge Park
Attendance: 150
Referee: Rob Warburton

28 September 2013
15:00

Taunton Titans	25 – 19	Shelford (BP)
	Report

Hyde Park
Attendance: 265
Referee: Phil Matters

=== Round 5 ===
5 October 2013
14:30

Dings Crusaders	25 – 19	Exmouth (BP)
	Report

Landseer Avenue
Attendance: 120
Referee: Guy Steel Bodger

5 October 2013
14:30

(BP) Hartpury College	51 – 15	Southend Saxons
	Report

College Stadium
Attendance: 320
Referee: Philip Davis

5 October 2013
15:00

(BP) Ampthill	56 – 11	Launceston
	Report

Dillingham Park
Attendance: 300
Referee: Jamie Leahy

5 October 2013
15:00

Bishop's Stortford	22 – 63	Cambridge (BP)
	Report

Silver Leys
Attendance: 300
Referee: James Sullivan

5 October 2013
15:00

Canterbury	20 – 13	Chinnor (BP)
	Report

Merton Lane
Attendance: 207
Referee: Paul Kimber

5 October 2013
15:00

London Irish Wild Geese	21 – 20	Clifton (BP)
	Report

Hazelwood
Attendance: 400
Referee: Alex Manley

5 October 2013
15:00

(BP) Redruth	24 – 18	Taunton Titans (BP)
	Report

The Recreation Ground
Attendance: 610
Referee: Phil Watters

5 October 2013
15:00

Shelford	26 – 26	Bournemouth
	Report

The Davey Field
Attendance: 240
Referee: Matthew O'Grady

=== Round 6 ===
12 October 2013
14:30

Dings Crusaders	17 – 26	London Irish Wild Geese
	Report

Landseer Avenue
Attendance: 197
Referee: Matthew O'Grady

12 October 2013
14:30

Exmouth	20 – 42	Shelford (BP)
	Report

Imperial Recreation Ground
Attendance: 121
Referee: Phil Watters

12 October 2013
15:00

(BP) Bournemouth	39 – 32	Redruth (2BP)
	Report

Chapel Gate
Attendance: 400
Referee: Max Marsden

12 October 2013
15:00

(BP) Cambridge	32 – 13	Clifton
	Report

Grantchester Road
Attendance: 398
Referee: Gareth Holsgrove

12 October 2013
15:00

(BP) Chinnor	39 – 47	Hartpury College (BP)
	Report

Kingsey Road
Attendance: 250
Referee: James Sullivan

12 October 2013
15:00

(BP) Launceston	34 – 33	Bishop's Stortford (2BP)
	Report

Polson Bridge
Attendance: 577
Referee: Veryan Boscawen

12 October 2013
15:00

(BP) Southend Saxons	30 – 21	Ampthill
	Report

Warners Bridge Park
Attendance: 180
Referee: Richard Kelly

12 October 2013
15:00

(BP) Taunton Titans	38 – 34	Canterbury (2BP)
	Report

Hyde Park
Attendance: 200
Referee: Graham Dickens

=== Round 7 ===
19 October 2013
14:30

Clifton	22 – 20	Launceston (BP)
	Report

Station Road
Attendance: 372
Referee: Dan Parrott

19 October 2013
14:30

(BP) Hartpury College	43 – 11	Taunton Titans
	Report

College Stadium
Attendance: 300
Referee: Andy Rawson

19 October 2013
15:00

Ampthill	21 – 11	Chinnor
	Report

Dillingham Park
Attendance: 200
Referee: Fergus Kirby

19 October 2013
15:00

(BP) Bishop's Stortford	22 – 15	Southend Saxons (BP)
	Report

Silver Leys
Attendance: 392
Referee: Graham Dickens

19 October 2013
15:00

(BP) Canterbury	36 – 6	Bournemouth
	Report

Merton Lane
Attendance: 220
Referee: James Clarke

19 October 2013
15:00

London Irish Wild Geese	10 – 43	Cambridge (BP)
	Report

Hazelwood
Attendance: 400
Referee: Veryan Boscawen

19 October 2013
15:00

(BP) Redruth	26 – 14	Exmouth
	Report

The Recreation Ground
Attendance: 608
Referee: Nick Williams

19 October 2013
15:00

(BP) Shelford	19 – 20	Dings Crusaders
	Report

The Davey Field
Attendance: 228
Referee: Alex Manley

=== Round 8 ===
26 October 2013
14:30

Bournemouth	12 – 50	Hartpury College (BP)
	Report

Chapel Gate
Attendance: 311
Referee: Paul Kimber

26 October 2013
14:00

Dings Crusaders	14 – 13	Redruth (BP)
	Report

Landseer Avenue
Attendance: 171
Referee: Veryan Boscawen

26 October 2013
14:30

(BP) Exmouth	41 – 51	Canterbury (BP)
	Report

Imperial Recreation Ground
Attendance: 137
Referee: Luke Haskins

26 October 2013
15:00

Chinnor	29 – 27	Bishop's Stortford (2BP)
	Report

Kingsey Road
Attendance: 440
Referee: Max Marsden

26 October 2013
15:00

Launceston	23 – 17	Cambridge (BP)
	Report

Polson Bridge
Attendance: 734
Referee: Nick Williams

26 October 2013
15:00

(BP) Shelford	41 – 19	London Irish Wild Geese
	Report

The Davey Field
Attendance: 177
Referee: Rob Warburton

26 October 2013
15:00

(BP) Southend Saxons	34 – 10	Clifton
	Report

Warners Bridge Park
Attendance: 120
Referee: Brendan Fitzmaurice

26 October 2013
15:00

Taunton Titans	26 – 22	Ampthill (BP)
	Report

Hyde Park
Attendance: 200
Referee: Morgan Whitehead

=== Round 9 ===
2 November 2013
14:00

Cambridge	25 – 10	Southend Saxons
	Report

Grantchester Road
Attendance: 410
Referee: Guy Steel Bodger

2 November 2013
14:15

(BP) Ampthill	36 – 0	Bournemouth
	Report

Dillingham Park
Attendance: 130
Referee: Gareth Holsgrove

2 November 2013
14:30

(BP) Hartpury College	50 – 10	Exmouth
	Report

College Stadium
Attendance: 220
Referee: Phil Watters

2 November 2013
14:30

(BP) London Irish Wild Geese	45 – 22	Launceston
	Report

Hazelwood
Attendance: 200
Referee: Max Marsden

2 November 2013
14:30

(BP) Clifton	24 – 20	Chinnor (BP)
	Report

Station Road
Attendance: 150
Referee: Philip Davis

2 November 2013
15:00

(2BP) Bishop's Stortford	32 – 37	Taunton Titans (BP)
	Report

Silver Leys
Attendance: 218
Referee: Alex Manley

2 November 2013
15:00

Canterbury	21 – 18	Dings Crusaders (BP)
	Report

Merton Lane
Attendance: 140
Referee: Rob Warburton

2 November 2013
15:00

Redruth	12 – 12	Shelford
	Report

The Recreation Ground
Attendance: 461
Referee: James Sullivan

=== Round 10 ===
9 November 2013
14:30

Bournemouth	3 – 20	Bishop's Stortford (BP)
	Report

Chapel Gate
Attendance: 250
Referee: Tom Davis

9 November 2013
14:30

(BP) Dings Crusaders	23 – 25	Hartpury College
	Report

Landseer Avenue
Attendance: 184
Referee: James Sullivan

9 November 2013
14:30

Exmouth	20 – 42	Ampthill (BP)
	Report

Imperial Recreation Ground
Attendance: 165
Referee: Paul Kimber

9 November 2013
14:30

(BP) Redruth	38 – 28	London Irish Wild Geese (BP)
	Report

The Recreation Ground
Attendance: 714
Referee: Phil Watters

9 November 2013
14:30

Shelford	23 – 12	Canterbury
	Report

The Davey Field
Attendance: 229
Referee: Will Halford

9 November 2013
15:00

(BP) Chinnor	40 – 17	Cambridge
	Report

Kingsey Road
Attendance: 346
Referee: Fergus Kirby

9 November 2013
15:00

(BP) Southend Saxons	14 – 17	Launceston
	Report

Warners Bridge Park
Attendance: 130
Referee: Max Marsden

9 November 2013
15:00

Taunton Titans	27 – 13	Clifton
	Report

Hyde Park
Attendance: 381
Referee: Nick Williams

=== Round 11 ===
16 November 2013
14:00

(BP) Cambridge	48 – 25	Taunton Titans (BP)
	Report

Grantchester Road
Attendance: 379
Referee: Calum Howard

16 November 2013
14:15

(BP) Ampthill	78 – 10	Dings Crusaders
	Report

Dillingham Park
Attendance: 150
Referee: Jamie Leahy

16 November 2013
14:30

(BP) Bishop's Stortford	31 – 7	Exmouth
	Report

Silver Leys
Attendance: 225
Referee: Gareth Holsgrove

16 November 2013
14:30

(BP) Clifton	53 – 13	Bournemouth
	Report

Station Road
Attendance: 156
Referee: Steven Light

16 November 2013
14:30

(BP) Hartpury College	46 – 23	Shelford
	Report

College Stadium
Attendance: 153
Referee: Tom Davis

16 November 2013
14:30

Launceston	22 – 20	Chinnor (BP)
	Report

Polson Bridge
Attendance: 531
Referee: Veryan Boscawen

16 November 2013
14:30

(2BP) London Irish Wild Geese	25 – 27	Southend Saxons
	Report

Hazlewood
Attendance: 200
Referee: Paul Kimber

16 November 2013
15:00

(BP) Canterbury	46 – 22	Redruth
	Report

Merton Lane
Attendance: 150
Referee: Philip Davis

=== Round 12 ===
23 November 2013
14:30

Bournemouth	17 – 33	Cambridge (BP)
	Report

Chapel Gate
Attendance: 300
Referee: James Sullivan

23 November 2013
14:30

Dings Crusaders	14 – 33	Bishop's Stortford (BP)
	Report

Landseer Avenue
Attendance: 168
Referee: Owain Griffiths

23 November 2013
14:30

(BP) Exmouth	36 – 34	Clifton (2BP)
	Report

Imperial Recreation Ground
Attendance: 101
Referee: Nick Williams

23 November 2013
14:30

(BP) Redruth	32 – 29	Hartpury College (2BP)
	Report

Recreation Ground
Attendance: 803
Referee: Shane Lewis

23 November 2013
14:30

Shelford	20 – 31	Ampthill (BP)
	Report

The Davey Field
Attendance: 303
Referee: Dan Parrott

23 November 2013
15:00

Canterbury	23 – 20	London Irish Wild Geese (BP)
	Report

Merton Lane
Attendance: 212
Referee: Veryan Boscawen

23 November 2013
15:00

(BP) Chinnor	28 – 36	Southend Saxons (BP)
	Report

Kingsey Road
Attendance: 221
Referee: Alex Manley

23 November 2013
15:00

(BP) Taunton Titans	30 – 18	Launceston
	Report

Hyde Park
Attendance: 524
Referee: Sara Cox

=== Round 13 ===
29 November 2013
19:45

Clifton	24 – 17	Dings Crusaders (BP)
	Report

Station Road
Attendance: 800
Referee: Gareth Holsgrove

30 November 2013
14:00

(BP) Cambridge	40 – 23	Exmouth
	Report

Grantchester Road
Attendance: 411
Referee: Veryan Boscawen

30 November 2013
14:15

(BP) Ampthill	38 – 17	Redruth
	Report

Dillingham Park
Attendance: 250
Referee: Tom Davis

30 November 2013
14:30

(BP) Bishop's Stortford	25 – 11	Shelford
	Report

Silver Leys
Attendance: 250
Referee: Richard Kelly

30 November 2013
14:30

(BP) Launceston	32 – 5	Bournemouth
	Report

Polson Bridge
Attendance: 672
Referee: Phil Watters

30 November 2013
14:30

London Irish Wild Geese	16 – 27	Chinnor
	Report

Hazelwood
Attendance: 300
Referee: Max Marsden

30 November 2013
15:00

(BP) Hartpury College	39 – 36	Canterbury (2BP)
	Report

College Stadium
Attendance: 158
Referee: Philip Davis

30 November 2013
15:00

(2BP) Southend Saxons	33 – 44	Taunton Titans (BP)
	Report

Warners Bridge Park
Attendance: 190
Referee: Calum Howard

=== Round 14 ===
7 December 2013
14:00

Canterbury	33 – 30	Ampthill
	Report

Merton Lane
Attendance: 257
Referee: James Sullivan

7 December 2013
14:00

(BP) Exmouth	25 – 32	Launceston
	Report

Imperial Recreation Ground
Attendance: 232
Referee: Max Marsden

7 December 2013
14:00

(BP) Redruth	29 – 25	Bishop's Stortford (2BP)
	Report

The Recreation Ground
Attendance: 487
Referee: Nick Williams

7 December 2013
14:00

(BP) Shelford	45 – 18	Clifton
	Report

The Davey Field
Attendance: 145
Referee: Brendan Fitzmaurice

7 December 2013
14:30

(2BP) Bournemouth	36 – 39	Southend Saxons (BP)
	Report

Chapel Gate
Attendance: 150
Referee: Paul Kimber

7 December 2013
14:30

(BP) Dings Crusaders	10 – 15	Cambridge
	Report

Landseer Avenue
Attendance: 172
Referee: Guy Steel Bodger

7 December 2013
14:30

Hartpury College	31 – 26	London Irish Wild Geese (BP)
	Report

College Stadium
Attendance: 212
Referee: Dai Cambourne

7 December 2013
15:00

Taunton Titans	20 – 15	Chinnor (BP)
	Report

Hyde Park
Attendance: 400
Referee: Matthew O'Grady

=== Round 15 ===
14 December 2013
14:00

(BP) Bishop's Stortford	22 – 27	Canterbury
	Report

Silver Leys
Attendance: 225
Referee: David Parsons

14 December 2013
14:00

(BP) Cambridge	17 – 23	Shelford
	Report

Grantchester Road
Attendance: 1,573
Referee: Philip Davis

14 December 2013
14:00

(BP) London Irish Wild Geese	35 – 8	Taunton Titans
	Report

Hazelwood
Attendance: 300
Referee: Stephen Light

14 December 2013
14:15

(BP) Ampthill	24 – 41	Hartpury College (BP)
	Report

Dillingham Park
Attendance: 300
Referee: Gareth Holsgrove

14 December 2013
14:30

Chinnor	21 – 17	Bournemouth (BP)
	Report

Kingsey Road
Attendance: 399
Referee: Simone Colantonio

14 December 2013
14:30

(BP) Clifton	35 – 21	Redruth
	Report

Station Road
Attendance: 257
Referee: Josh Chapman

14 December 2013
14:30

(BP) Launceston	31 – 27	Dings Crusaders (BP)
	Report

Polson Bridge
Attendance: 585
Referee: Nick Williams

14 December 2013
15:00

(BP) Southend Saxons	36 – 19	Exmouth
	Report

Warners Bridge Park
Attendance: 190
Referee: Alex Manley

=== Round 16 ===
21 December 2013
14:00

Redruth	18 – 10 (Note: Second leg of 2013-14 Cornish Super Cup. Launceston win 39–28 on aggregate.)	Launceston
	Report

The Recreation Ground
Attendance: 1,350
Referee: Fergus Kirby

21 December 2013
14:00

(BP) London Irish Wild Geese	34 – 10	Bournemouth

Hazelwood
Attendance: 300
Referee: James Munro

21 December 2013
14:15

(BP) Ampthill	41 – 22	Bishop's Stortford
	Report

Dillingham Park
Attendance: 200
Referee: Rob Warburton

21 December 2013
14:30

(BP) Dings Crusaders	38 – 0	Chinnor
	Report

Landseer Avenue
Attendance: 187
Referee: Mike Hudson

21 December 2013
14:30

(BP) Hartpury College	41 – 24	Clifton
	Report

College Stadium
Attendance: 88
Referee: Phil Watters

21 December 2013
14:30

Shelford	16 – 10	Southend Saxons (BP)

The Davey Field
Attendance: 212
Referee: Craig Maxwell Keys

21 December 2013
15:00

Canterbury	8 – 3	Cambridge (BP)
	Report

Merton Lane
Attendance: 362
Referee: Gareth Holsgrove

21 December 2013

Exmouth	P – P	Taunton Titans

- Postponed. Game to be rescheduled for 22 February 2014.

=== Round 17 ===
4 January 2014
14:00

Bishop's Stortford	18 – 13	London Irish Wild Geese (BP)
	Report

Silver Leys
Attendance: 240
Referee: Brendan Fitzmaurice

4 January 2014
14:00

(BP) Cambridge	32 – 21	Hartpury College
	Report

Grantchester Road
Attendance: 433
Referee: Richard Kelly

4 January 2014
14:30

(BP) Chinnor	20 – 21	Shelford
	Report

Kingsey Road
Attendance: 390
Referee: Calum Howard

4 January 2014
14:30

(BP) Clifton	36 – 12	Ampthill
	Report

Station Road
Attendance: 150
Referee: Luke Haskins

4 January 2014
14:30

Launceston	18 – 6	Canterbury
	Report

Polson Bridge
Attendance: 373
Referee: Nick Williams

4 January 2014
15:00

(BP) Southend Saxons	22 – 0	Redruth
	Report

Warners Bridge Park
Attendance: 111
Referee: Dan Parrott

4 January 2014
15:00

Taunton Titans	24 – 5	Dings Crusaders
	Report

Hyde Park
Attendance: 407
Referee: Veryan Boscawen

4 January 2014

Bournemouth	P – P	Exmouth

- Postponed. Game to be replayed on 15 March 2014.

=== Round 18 ===
11 January 2014
14:00

London Irish Wild Geese	21 – 15	Exmouth (BP)
	Report

Hazelwood
Attendance: 150
Referee: Alex Manley

11 January 2014
14:00

Shelford	27 – 22	Taunton Titans (BP)
	Report

The Davey Field
Attendance: 229

11 January 2014
14:15

(BP) Ampthill	40 - 10	Cambridge
	Report

Dillingham Park
Attendance: 100
Referee: Ross Campbell

11 January 2014
14:30

(BP) Dings Crusaders	33 – 29	Bournemouth (2BP)
	Report

Landseer Avenue
Attendance: 162
Referee: Guy Steel Bodger

11 January 2014
14:30

(2BP) Redruth	25 – 26	Chinnor (BP)
	Report

The Recreation Ground
Attendance: 672
Referee: Phil Watters

11 January 2014
15:00

(BP) Canterbury	27 – 21	Southend Saxons (BP)
	Report

Merton Lane
Attendance: 357
Referee: James Sullivan

11 January 2014
15:00

(BP) Hartpury College	40 – 13	Launceston
	Report

College Stadium
Attendance: 123
Referee: Shane Lewis

11 January 2014
14:00

Bishop's Stortford	13 – 10	Clifton (BP)
	Report

Silver Leys
Attendance: 185
Referee: Max Marsden

=== Round 19 ===
18 January 2014
14:00

(2BP) Cambridge	32 – 36	Bishop's Stortford (BP)
	Report

Grantchester Road
Attendance: 544
Referee: Stephen Light

18 January 2014
14:00

Exmouth	12 – 30	Dings Crusaders (BP)
	Report

Imperial Recreation Ground
Attendance: 183
Referee: Nick Williams

18 January 2014
14:30

Bournemouth	20 – 27	Shelford
	Report

Chapel Gate
Attendance: 150
Referee: Richard Kelly

18 January 2014
14:30

(BP) Chinnor	17 – 24	Canterbury
	Report

Kingsey Road
Attendance: 343

18 January 2014
14:30

Clifton	23 – 13	London Irish Wild Geese
	Report

Station Road
Attendance: 237
Referee: Mike Hudson

18 January 2014
15:00

Southend Saxons	7 – 23	Hartpury College
	Report

Warners Bridge Park
Attendance: 206
Referee: Nick Cockburn

18 January 2014
15:00

Taunton Titans	16 – 5	Redruth
	Report

Hyde Park
Attendance: 456
Referee: James Clarke

18 January 2014
14:30

Launceston	P – P	Ampthill

- Postponed. Game to be rescheduled for 22 February 2014.

=== Round 20 ===
25 January 2014
14:00

(BP) Bishop's Stortford	34 - 7	Launceston
	Report

Silver Leys
Attendance: 254
Referee: Alex Manley

25 January 2014
14:00

(BP) London Irish Wild Geese	39 – 26	Dings Crusaders (BP)
	Report

Hazelwood
Attendance: 200
Referee: Veryan Boscawen

25 January 2014
14:00

(BP) Shelford	29 – 21	Exmouth
	Report

The Davey Field
Attendance: Graham Dickens
Referee: 216

25 January 2014
14:15

Ampthill	17 – 14	Southend Saxons (BP)
	Report

Dillingham Park
Attendance: 150
Referee: James Clarke

25 January 2014
14:30

(BP) Clifton	26 – 19	Cambridge (BP)
	Report

Station Road
Attendance: 288
Referee: Llyr Apgeraint-Roberts

25 January 2014
14:30

Redruth	21 – 10	Bournemouth
	Report

The Recreation Ground
Attendance: 786
Referee: Nick Williams

25 January 2014
15:00

(BP) Canterbury	27 – 17	Taunton Titans
	Report

Merton Lane
Attendance: 287
Referee: Paul Kimber

25 January 2014
15:00

(BP) Hartpury College	31 – 14	Chinnor
	Report

College Stadium
Attendance: 335
Referee: James Sullivan

=== Round 21 ===
1 February 2014
14:00

Exmouth	13 – 35	Redruth (BP)
	Report

Imperial Recreation Ground
Attendance: 195
Referee: James Sullivan

1 February 2014
14:00

Cambridge	3 – 19	London Irish Wild Geese
	Report

Grantchester Road
Attendance: 398
Referee: Alex Manley

1 February 2014
14:30

Dings Crusaders	26 – 6	Shelford
	Report

Landseer Avenue
Attendance: 115
Referee: Max Marsden

1 February 2014
14:30

Launceston	17 – 5	Clifton
	Report

Polson Bridge
Attendance: 346
Referee: Philip Davis

1 February 2014
15:00

Taunton Titans	22 – 12	Hartpury College
	Report

Hyde Park
Attendance: 250
Referee: Shane Lewis

1 February 2014

Bournemouth	P – P	Canterbury

- Postponed. Game to be rescheduled for 22 February 2014.

1 February 2014

Southend Saxons	P – P	Bishop's Stortford

- Postponed. Game to be rescheduled for 22 February 2014.

1 February 2014

Chinnor	P – P	Ampthill

- Postponed. Game to be rescheduled for 15 March 2014.

=== Round 22 ===
8 February 2014
14:15

(BP) Ampthill	40 – 12	Taunton Titans
	Report

Dillingham Park
Attendance: 180
Referee: David Parsons

8 February 2014
14:30

Clifton	19 – 18	Southend Saxons (BP)
	Report

Station Road
Attendance: 80
Referee: Josh Chapman

8 February 2014
14:30

(BP) Canterbury	32 – 7	Exmouth
	Report

Merton Lane
Attendance: 167
Referee: James Clarke

8 February 2014
15:00

(BP) Hartpury College	29 – 5	Bournemouth
	Report

College Stadium
Attendance: 142
Referee: Matthew O'Grady

8 February 2014
15:00

(BP) Redruth	10 – 15	Dings Crusaders
	Report

The Recreation Ground
Attendance: 635
Referee: Nick Williams

8 February 2014

London Irish Wild Geese	P – P	Shelford

- Postponed. Game to be rescheduled for 22 February 2014.

8 February 2014

Bishop's Stortford	P – P	Chinnor

- Postponed. Game to be rescheduled for 19 April 2014.

8 February 2014

Cambridge	P – P	Launceston

- Postponed. Game to be rescheduled for 15 March 2014.

=== Round 23 ===
15 February 2014

Bournemouth	P – P	Ampthill

- Postponed. Game rescheduled to 19 April 2014.

15 February 2014

Chinnor	P – P	Clifton

- Postponed. Game rescheduled to 22 February 2014.

15 February 2014

Dings Crusaders	P – P	Canterbury

- Postponed. Game rescheduled to 15 March 2014.

15 February 2014

Exmouth	P – P	Hartpury College

- Postponed. Game rescheduled to 19 April 2014.

15 February 2014

Launceston	P – P	London Irish Wild Geese

- Postponed. Game rescheduled to 19 April 2014.

15 February 2014

Shelford	P – P	Redruth

- Postponed. Game rescheduled to 15 March 2014.

15 February 2014

Southend Saxons	P – P	Cambridge

- Postponed. Game rescheduled to 19 April 2014.

15 February 2014

Taunton Titans	P – P	Bishop's Stortford

- Postponed. Game rescheduled to 15 March 2015.

=== Rounds 16, 19, 21, 22 & 23 (Rescheduled Games) ===
22 February 2014
14:00

Launceston	23 – 38	Ampthill (BP)
	Report

Polson Bridge
Attendance: 591
Referee: Tom Davis

- Game rescheduled from 18 January 2014

22 February 2014
14:30

(BP) Bournemouth	30 – 32	Canterbury (BP)
	Report

Chapel Gate
Attendance: 100
Referee: Paul Kimber

- Game rescheduled from 1 February 2014.

22 February 2014
14:30

Exmouth	20 – 36	Taunton (BP)
	Report

Imperial Recreation Ground
Attendance: 203
Referee: Nick Williams

- Game rescheduled from 21 December 2013

22 February 2014
14:30

(BP) London Irish Wild Geese	59 – 24	Shelford (BP)
	Report

Hazelwood
Attendance: 271
Referee: Christopher Ridley

- Game rescheduled from 8 February 2015.

22 February 2014
15:00

(2BP) Chinnor	22 – 28	Clifton
	Report

Kingsey Road
Attendance: 147
Referee: Luke Haskins

- Game rescheduled from 15 February 2014

22 February 2014
15:00

Southend Saxons	13 – 39	Bishop's Stortford (BP)
	Report

Warners Bridge Park
Attendance: 112
Referee: Stephen Light

- Game rescheduled from 1 February 2014.

=== Round 24 ===
1 March 2014
14:30

Clifton	28 – 22	Taunton (BP)
	Report

Station Road
Attendance: 329
Referee: Dan Parrott

1 March 2014
15:00

(BP) Ampthill	43 – 10	Exmouth
	Report

Dillingham Park
Attendance: 150
Referee: Max Marsden

1 March 2014
15:00

(2BP) Bishop's Stortford	28 – 33	Bournemouth (BP)
	Report

Silver Leys
Attendance: 295
Referee: Gareth Holsgrove

1 March 2014
15:00

(BP) Cambridge	29 – 13	Chinnor
	Report

Grantchester Road
Attendance: 350
Referee: Graham Dickens

1 March 2014
15:00

(BP) Canterbury	25 – 20	Shelford
	Report

Merton Lane
Attendance: 312
Referee: Veryan Boscawen

1 March 2014
15:00

(BP) Hartpury College	29 – 22	Dings Crusaders (BP)
	Report

College Stadium
Attendance: 362
Referee: Brendan McGaffney

1 March 2014
15:00

London Irish Wild Geese	26 – 20	Redruth (BP)
	Report

Hazelwood
Attendance: 200
Referee: Paul Kimber

1 March 2014
15:30

Launceston	17 – 32	Southend Saxons (BP)
	Report

Polson Bridge
Attendance: 556
Referee: Phil Watters

=== Round 25 ===
8 March 2014
14:30

Bournemouth	15 – 34	Clifton (BP)
	Report

Chapel Gate
Attendance: 200
Referee: Christopher Ridley

8 March 2014
14:30

Dings Crusaders	19 – 34	Ampthill (BP)
	Report

Landseer Avenue
Attendance: 210
Referee: Guy Steel Bodger

8 March 2014
14:30

(BP) Exmouth	20 – 21	Bishop's Stortford
	Report

Imperial Recreation Ground
Attendance: 214
Referee: James Clarke

8 March 2014
15:00

Chinnor	28 – 20	Launceston
	Report

Kingsey Road
Attendance: 383
Referee: Ryan Smith

8 March 2014
15:00

Redruth	21 – 17	Canterbury (BP)
	Report

The Recreation Ground
Attendance: 815
Referee: Nick Williams

8 March 2014
15:00

(BP) Shelford	18 – 23	Hartpury College (BP)
	Report

The Davey Field
Attendance: 258
Referee: Fergus Kirby

8 March 2014
15:00

Southend Saxons	25 – 17	London Irish Wild Geese
	Report

Warners Bridge Park
Attendance: 205
Referee: Gareth Holsgrove

8 March 2014
15:00

(BP) Taunton	39 – 10	Cambridge
	Report

Hyde Park
Attendance: 300
Referee: Veryan Boscawen

=== Rounds 17, 21, 22 & 23 (Rescheduled Games) ===
15 March 2014
14:00

Cambridge	36 – 13	Launceston
	Report

Grantchester Road
Attendance: 294
Referee: Christopher Ridley

- Game rescheduled from 8 February 2014.

15 March 2014
14:30

Bournemouth	24 – 17	Exmouth (BP)
	Report

Chapel Gate
Attendance: 100
Referee: Alex Manley

- Game rescheduled from 4 January 2014.

15 March 2014
14:30

(BP) Dings Crusaders	17 – 20	Canterbury
	Report

Landseer Avenue
Attendance: 120

- Game rescheduled from 15 February 2014.

15 March 2014
14:30

(BP) Shelford	37 – 15	Redruth
	Report

The Davey Field
Attendance: 127
Referee: Mike Hudson

- Game rescheduled from 15 February 2014.

15 March 2014
15:00

(BP) Chinnor	31 – 35	Ampthill (BP)
	Report

Kingsey Road
Attendance: 221
Referee: Tom Davis

- Game rescheduled from 1 February 2014.

15 March 2014
15:00

Taunton	24 – 24	Bishop's Stortford
	Report

Hyde Park
Attendance: 175
Referee: James Clarke

- Game rescheduled from 15 February 2014.

=== Round 26 ===
22 March 2014
14:30

(BP) Clifton	40 – 22	Exmouth
	Report

Station Road
Attendance: 372
Referee: Fergus Kirby

22 March 2014
14:30

Launceston	15 – 10	Taunton Titans (BP)
	Report

Polson Bridge
Attendance: 752
Referee: Phil Watters

22 March 2014
15:00

(BP) Ampthill	36 – 10	Shelford
	Report

Dillingham Park
Attendance: 200
Referee: Gareth Holsgrove

22 March 2014
15:00

(BP) Bishop's Stortford	35 – 14	Dings Crusaders
	Report

Silver Leys
Attendance: 205
Referee: Veryan Boscawen

22 March 2014
15:00

(BP) Cambridge	41 – 21	Bournemouth
	Report

Grantchester Road
Attendance: 450
Referee: Guy Steel Bodger

22 March 2014
15:00

(BP) Hartpury College	48 – 12	Redruth
	Report

College Stadium
Attendance: 183
Referee: Shane Lewis

22 March 2014
15:00

London Irish Wild Geese	13 – 29	Canterbury (BP)
	Report

Hazelwood
Attendance: 400
Referee: Clare Hodnett

22 March 2014
15:00

Southend Saxons	27 – 25	Chinnor (BP)
	Report

Warners Bridge Park
Attendance: 150
Referee: Alex Manley

=== Round 27 ===
29 March 2014
14:30

Bournemouth	25 – 21	Launceston (BP)
	Report

Chapel Gate
Attendance: 300
Referee: Mike Hudson

29 March 2014
14:30

(BP) Dings Crusaders	43 – 10	Clifton
	Report

Landseer Avenue
Attendance: 250
Referee: Paul Kimber

29 March 2014
14:30

Exmouth	27 – 12	Cambridge
	Report

Imperial Recreation Ground
Attendance: 150
Referee: Nick Williams

29 March 2014
15:00

(BP) Canterbury	44 – 29	Hartpury College (BP)
	Report

Merton Lane
Attendance: 834
Referee: Veryan Boscawen

29 March 2014
15:00

(BP) Chinnor	31 – 47	London Irish Wild Geese (BP)
	Report

Kingsey Road
Attendance: 398
Referee: Luis Caviglia

29 March 2014
15:00

(BP) Redruth	41 – 36	Ampthill (BP)
	Report

The Recreation Ground
Attendance: 734
Referee: Luke Haskins

29 March 2014
15:00

(BP) Shelford	22 – 24	Bishop's Stortford
	Report

The Davey Field
Attendance: 636
Referee: Alex Manley

29 March 2014
15:00

Taunton Titans	22 – 18	Southend Saxons (BP)
	Report

Hyde Park
Attendance: 225
Referee: Dewi Phillips

=== Round 28 ===
5 April 2014
15:00

(BP) Ampthill	41 – 8	Canterbury
	Report

Dillingham Park
Attendance: 400
Referee: Rob Warburton

5 April 2014
15:00

(BP) Bishops Stortford	53 – 8	Redruth
	Report

Silver Leys
Attendance: 430
Referee: Richard Kelly

5 April 2014
14:30

Clifton	13 – 21	Shelford
	Report

Station Road
Attendance: 110
Referee: James Clarke

5 April 2014
15:00

(BP) Cambridge	29 – 26	Dings Crusaders (2BP)
	Report

Grantchester Road
Attendance: 435
Referee: James Munro

5 April 2014
15:00

Chinnor	20 – 18	Taunton Titans (BP)
	Report

Kingsey Road
Attendance: 328
Referee: Max Marsden

5 April 2014
15:00

Launceston	18 – 17	Exmouth (BP)
	Report

Polson Bridge
Attendance: 584
Referee: Paul Kimber

5 April 2014
15:00

(2BP) London Irish Wild Geese	34 – 37	Hartpury College (BP)
	Report

Hazelwood
Attendance: 500
Referee: Luke Haskins

5 April 2014
15:00

(BP) Southend Saxons	57 – 26	Bournemouth (BP)
	Report

Warners Bridge Park
Attendance: 152
Referee: Brendan Fitzmaurice

=== Round 29 ===
12 April 2014
14:30

(BP) Bournemouth	56 – 19	Chinnor
	Report

Chapel Gate
Attendance: 250
Referee: Max Marsden

12 April 2014
14:30

(BP) Dings Crusaders	36 – 24	Launceston
	Report

Landseer Avenue
Attendance: 220
Referee: Alex Manley

12 April 2014
14:30

(BP) Exmouth	34 – 27	Southend Saxons (BP)
	Report

Imperial Recreation Ground
Attendance: 147
Referee: Guy Steel Bodger

12 April 2014
15:00

(BP) Canterbury	27 – 31	Bishop's Stortford (BP)
	Report

Merton Lane
Attendance: 523
Referee: Matthew O'Grady

12 April 2014
15:00

(BP) Hartpury College	39 – 30	Ampthill
	Report

College Stadium
Attendance: 369
Referee: Philip Davis

12 April 2014
15:00

(BP) Redruth	34 – 15	Clifton
	Report

The Recreation Ground
Attendance: 868
Referee: Phil Watters

12 April 2014
15:00

(BP) Shelford	8 – 13	Cambridge
	Report

The Davey Field
Attendance: 1,905
Referee: Jack Makepeace

12 April 2014
15:00

Taunton Titans	45 – 15	London Irish Wild Geese
	Report

Hyde Park
Attendance: 300
Referee: Paul Kimber

=== Rounds 22 & 23 (Rescheduled Games) ===
19 April 2014
14:00

(BP) Bishop's Stortford	43 - 12	Chinnor
	Report

Silver Leys
Attendance: 360
Referee: Philip Davis

- Game rescheduled from 8 February 2014.

19 April 2014
14:00

(BP) Exmouth	32 – 47	Hartpury College (BP)
	Report

Imperial Recreation Ground
Attendance: 193
Referee: Luke Haskins

- Game rescheduled from 15 February 2014.

19 April 2014
14:30

Bournemouth	23 - 61	Ampthill (BP)
	Report

Chapel Gate
Attendance: Simon Harding
Referee: 193

- Game rescheduled from 15 February 2014.

19 April 2014
14:30

Launceston	27 – 23	London Irish Wild Geese (BP)
	Report

Polson Bridge
Attendance: 656
Referee: Tom Davis

- Game rescheduled from 15 February 2014.

19 April 2014
14:30

(BP) Southend Saxons	53 – 25	Cambridge
	Report

Warners Bridge Park
Attendance: 229
Referee: Richard Kelly

- Game rescheduled from 15 February 2014.

=== Round 30 ===
26 April 2014
14:30

(BP) Clifton	43 – 12	Canterbury
	Report

Station Road
Attendance: 300
Referee: Luke Haskins

26 April 2014
15:00

(BP) Ampthill	40 – 24	London Irish Wild Geese
	Report

Dillingham Park
Attendance: 410
Referee: Jamie Leahy

26 April 2014
15:00

(BP) Bishop's Stortford	31 – 21	Hartpury College
	Report

Silver Leys
Attendance: 610
Referee: James Clarke

26 April 2014
15:00

(BP) Cambridge	19 – 20	Redruth (BP)
	Report

Grantchester Road
Attendance: 650
Referee: Eanna O'Dowd

26 April 2014
15:00

(BP) Chinnor	32 – 12	Exmouth
	Report

Kingsey Road
Attendance: 463
Referee: Philip Davis

26 April 2014
15:00

Launceston	16 – 6	Shelford
	Report

Polson Bridge
Attendance: 799
Referee: Nick Williams

26 April 2014
15:00

Southend Saxons	12 – 31	Dings Crusaders (BP)
	Report

Warners Bridge Park
Attendance: 480
Referee: Gareth Holsgrove

26 April 2014
15:00

(BP) Taunton Titans	48 – 27	Bournemouth
	Report

Hyde Park
Attendance: 250
Referee: Max Marsden

=== Promotion play–off ===
Each season, the runners–up in the National League 2 South and National League 2 North participate in a play–off for promotion into National Division 1. Darlington Mowden Park were runners-up in the 2013–14 National League 2 North and as they had a better record than the South runners-up, Ampthill, they hosted the play–off match. The game was played on 3 May 2014 at The Northern Echo Arena and finished 25 – 25 after normal time, so went to two 10-minute periods of extra time. The game was won with a try scored by DMP in the 3rd minute of added on time. As a result, they will play in National League 1 in the 2014–15 season for the first time.

3 May 2014
15:00

Darlington Mowden Park	30 – 28 a.e.t.	Ampthill
	Darlington MP; Ampthill

The Northern Echo Arena
Attendance: 975
Referee: Wayne Falla

== Total season attendances ==
Club	Home Games	Total	Average	Highest	Lowest	% Capacity
Ampthill	15	3,285	219	400	100	7%
Bishop's Stortford	15	4,464	298	610	205	19%
Bournemouth	15	3,654	244	400	100	16%
Cambridge	15	7,605	507	1,573	294	23%
Canterbury	15	4,368	291	834	140	19%
Chinnor	15	5,061	337	482	147	17%
Clifton	15	4,251	283	800	80	13%
Dings Crusaders	15	2,801	187	415	110	12%
Exmouth	15	2,683	179	300	101	14%
Hartpury College	15	3,370	225	369	88	11%
Launceston	15	10,093	673	1,650	346	22%
London Irish Wild Geese	15	4,371	291	500	150	4%
Redruth	15	10,799	720	1,350	461	21%
Shelford	15	5,379	359	1,905	127	18%
Southend Saxons	15	2,755	184	480	111	12%
Taunton Titans	15	4,689	313	524	175	16%

== Individual statistics ==
- Note that points scorers includes tries as well as conversions, penalties and drop goals.

=== Top points scorers ===
Rank	Player	Team	Appearances	Points
1	(England) Elliot Clements-Hill	Ampthill	30	366
2	(England) William Millet	Chinnor	28	283
3	(England) Jim Wigglesworth	Cambridge	28	255
4	(England) Kieron Lewitt	Launceston	27	251
4	(England) Mark Woodrow	Dings Crusaders	29	251
5	(England) Tom Best	Canterbury	27	210
6	(England) Billy Burns	Hartpury College	19	205
7	(England) Bradley Burr	Southend Saxons	23	193
8	(England) Elliot Bale	Shelford	16	191
9	(England) Gary Kingdom	Taunton Titans	26	182

=== Top try scorers ===
Rank	Player	Team	Appearances	Tries
1	(England) Dean Adamson	Ampthill	30	24
2	(England) Martyn Beaumont	Canterbury	29	21
2	(England) Elliot Clements-Hill	Ampthill	30	21
3	(England) Steff Reynolds	Hartpury College	17	20
3	(Australia) Scott Tolmie	London Irish Wild Geese	29	20
4	(England) Jim Wigglesworth	Cambridge	28	17
4	(England) Nicholas Hankin	Bishop's Stortford	30	17
5	(England) Mark Billings	Bishop's Stortford	29	14
6	(England) Steve Leonard	Hartpury College	27	13
6	(Portugal) Jake Carter	Hartpury College	28	13
6	(England) William Millet	Chinnor	28	13
6	(England) Danny Cleare	Southend Saxons	30	13

== Season records ==
=== Team ===
Largest home win — 68 pts

78 - 10 Ampthill at home to Dings Crusaders on 16 November 2013

Largest away win — 41 pts

63 – 22 Cambridge away to Bishop's Stortford on 5 October 2013

Most points scored — 78 pts

78 - 10 Ampthill at home to Dings Crusaders on 16 November 2013

Most tries in a match — 12

Ampthill at home to Dings Crusaders on 16 November 2013

Most conversions in a match — 9 (x2)

Cambridge away to Bishop's Stortford on 5 October 2013
Ampthill at home to Dings Crusaders on 16 November 2013

Most penalties in a match — 7

Launceston at home to Hartpury College on 28 September 2013

Most drop goals in a match — 1

N/A - multiple teams

=== Player ===
Most points in a match — 31

(England) Elliot Clements-Hill for Ampthill away to Bournemouth on 19 April 2014

Most tries in a match — 4 (x4)

(England) Sam Hardcastle for Bournemouth at home to London Irish Wild Geese on 14 September 2013
(England) Tristan Corpe for Chinnor at home to Dings Crusaders on 14 September 2013
(England) Dean Adamson for Ampthill at home to Dings Crusaders on 16 November 2013
(England) Jim Wigglesworth for Cambridge at home to Exmouth on 30 November 2013

Most conversions in a match — 9

(England) Jim Wigglesworth for Cambridge away to Bishop's Stortford on 5 October 2013

Most penalties in a match — 6

(England) Jake Murphy for Launceston at home to Hartpury College on 28 September 2013

Most drop goals in a match — 1

N/A - multiple players

=== Attendances ===
Highest — 1,905

Shelford at home to Cambridge on 12 April 2014

Lowest — 80

Clifton at home to Southend Saxons on 8 February 2014

Highest Average Attendance — 720

Redruth

Lowest Average Attendance — 179

Exmouth

== See also ==
- English rugby union system
- Rugby union in England
