= 2013–14 National League 2 North =

Rugby union competition in England

- Countries: England
- Champions: Macclesfield
- Runners-up: Darlington Mowden Park (also promoted)
- Relegated: Dudley Kingswinford, Bromsgrove, Sheffield Tigers
- Matches played: 240
- Attendance: 79,429 (average 331 per match)
- Highest attendance: 3,750; Darlington Mowden Park v Macclesfield; 26 April 2014
- Lowest attendance: 90; Hull v Otley; 14 December 2013
- Top point scorer: (England) Stephen Collins (Sedgley Park); 298 points
- Top try scorer: (England) Ryan Parkinson (Macclesfield); 32 tries

The 2013–14 National League 2 North was the fourth season (27th overall) of the fourth tier (north) of the English domestic rugby union competitions since the professionalised format of the second division was introduced. The league system was 4 points for a win, 2 points for a draw and additional bonus points being awarded for scoring 4 or more tries and/or losing within 7 points of the victorious team. In terms of promotion the league champions would go straight up into National League 1 while the runners up would have a one-game playoff against the runners up from National League 2 South (at the home ground of the club with the superior league record) for the final promotion place.

The battle for the league title was as tight as it had ever been in the division with three teams - Darlington Mowden Park, Macclesfield and Stourbridge - looking to go up in a title race that went to the very last day of the season. Stourbridge won their final game away to Harrogate via a bonus point victory meaning that the winner of Darlington Mowden Park and Macclesfield was likely to go up. In a very close game in front of a record National 2 North crowd of 3,750 at The Northern Echo Arena, Mowden Park emerged as the victors 28 - 24 against Macclesfield only for the Cheshire side to gain 2 bonus points in defeat. These bonus points meant that it was Macclesfield that went up 1 point clear of their two title rivals, returning to their former league after just one season out. Despite the disappointment of losing out on the last day of the season, Darlington Mowden Park would follow Macclesfield up into the 2013–14 National League 1 by defeating Ampthill in the north-south promotion playoff in what was a very tight game that took extra time to be resolved. The move to The Northern Echo Arena marked a significant turnaround in fortunes for the north-east side, with large crowds attending on a regular basis, averaging more than 800 spectators per game. This was particularly impressive given that matches at their former Yiewsley Drive ground just a couple of seasons earlier had attracted only around 200 hardcore supporters. Spare a thought for Stourbridge, though, as the Midlands side would have comfortably secured promotion in almost any other season, only to miss out in what was arguably the most competitive title race in the division’s recent history.

While the fight for promotion had been extremely fierce the battle for relegation was far less so. Dudley Kingswinford ended a two-year stay in the division in what was a very poor season, failing to win any games at all and only having 6 points all season from try and losing bonuses (they were the first team to lose all 30 games in the division since Manchester in 2010-11, although bonus points gave them a better overall record). Dudley Kingswinford would be followed in relegation by fellow Midlands side Bromsgrove whose 5 wins were not enough and finally by Sheffield Tigers who did better but not enough to catch 13th placed Hull. Dudley Kingswinford and Bromsgrove would drop to National League 3 Midlands while Sheffield Tigers fell to National League 3 North.

== Participating teams and locations ==
Twelve of the teams listed below participated in the 2012–13 National League 2 North season. Macclesfield and Sedgley Park were relegated from the 2012–13 National League 1; Chester (champions) and Harrogate (playoffs) were promoted from National League 3 North; Ampthill were promoted from National League 3 Midlands as champions and were then level transferred to the 2013–14 National League 2 South, due to an imbalance in the number of teams in the two fourth tier leagues.

Locations of the 2013-14 National League 2 North teams

Team	Stadium	Capacity	City/Area
Birmingham & Solihull	Portway		Portway, Birmingham, West Midlands
Bromsgrove	Finstall Park		Bromsgrove, Worcestershire
Caldy	Paton Field	4,000	Thurstaston, Wirral, Merseyside
Chester	Hare Lane	2,000 (500 seats)	Chester, Cheshire
Darlington Mowden Park	The Northern Echo Arena	25,000	Darlington, County Durham
Dudley Kingswinford	Heathbrook	2,260 (260 seats)	Kingswinford, Dudley, West Midlands
Harrogate	Claro Road	4,500 (500 seats)	Harrogate, North Yorkshire
Hull	Ferens Ground	1,500 (288 seats)	Kingston upon Hull, East Riding of Yorkshire
Leicester Lions	Westleigh Park	2,000	Blaby, Leicestershire
Luctonians	Mortimer Park	2,500 (300 seats) (Note: Luctonians ground capacity increased from 2,200 to 2,500 due to completion of 300 seater grandstand.)	Kingsland, Herefordshire
Macclesfield	Priory Park	1,250 (250 seats)	Macclesfield, Cheshire
Otley	Cross Green	7,000 (852 seats)	Otley, West Yorkshire
Preston Grasshoppers	Lightfoot Green	2,250 (250 seats)	Preston, Lancashire
Sedgley Park	Park Lane	3,000	Whitefield, Bury, Greater Manchester
Sheffield Tigers	Dore Moor	1,000	Sheffield, South Yorkshire
Stourbridge	Stourton Park	3,500 (499 seats)	Stourbridge, West Midlands

== League table ==
National League 2 North table
Pos	Team	Pld	W	D	L	PF	PA	PD	TB	LB	Pts	Qualification
1	Macclesfield (C)	30	26	1	3	1081	511	+570	24	2	132	Promoted
2	Darlington Mowden Park (P)	30	27	0	3	1081	390	+691	22	1	131	Promotion play-off
3	Stourbridge	30	27	1	2	1034	363	+671	20	1	131	
4	Sedgley Park	30	21	0	9	993	598	+395	17	5	106	
5	Chester	30	18	0	12	661	510	+151	11	5	88	
6	Birmingham & Solihull	30	17	0	13	741	599	+142	13	5	86	
7	Leicester Lions	30	14	0	16	763	725	+38	11	6	73	
8	Caldy	30	14	0	16	705	778	−73	12	5	73	
9	Harrogate	30	14	0	16	759	794	−35	9	7	72	
10	Luctonians	30	14	0	16	613	816	−203	8	5	69	
11	Preston Grasshoppers	30	13	0	17	596	662	−66	9	6	67	
12	Otley	30	12	0	18	670	699	−29	8	6	57 (Note: Otley was docked 5 points after selecting an ineligible player on 21 December 2013 against Harrogate. They appealed to the RFU but failed to have the judgement overturned.)	
13	Hull	30	9	0	21	666	884	−218	10	5	51	
14	Sheffield Tigers (R)	30	8	0	22	488	782	−294	4	7	43	Relegated
15	Bromsgrove (R)	30	5	0	25	487	1032	−545	4	3	27	Relegated
16	Dudley Kingswinford	30	0	0	30	320	1515	−1195	2	4	6	Relegated

Updated to match(es) played on 9 May 2014. Source: RFU
Rules for classification: If teams are level at any stage, tiebreakers are applied in the following order:
1. Number of matches won
2. Difference between points for and against
3. Total number of points for
4. Aggregate number of points scored in matches between tied teams
5. Number of matches won excluding the first match, then the second and so on until the tie is settled
  (C) Champion; (P) Promoted; (R) Relegated
  Notes:

== Results ==
=== Round 1 ===
7 September 2013
14:00

Leicester Lions	29 - 16	Dudley Kingswinford
	Report

Westleigh Park
Attendance: 113
Referee: Gareth Holsgrove

7 September 2013
14:30

(BP) Sedgley Park	36 - 0	Caldy
	Report

Park Lane
Attendance: 210
Referee: Andy Rawson

7 September 2013
15:00

(BP) Chester	24 - 13	Birmingham & Solihull
	Report

Hare Lane
Attendance: 375
Referee: Brendan McGaffney

7 September 2013
15:00

(BP) Luctonians	29 - 27	Hull (BP)
	Report

Mortimer Park
Attendance: 608
Referee: Matthew O'Grady

7 September 2013
15:00

(BP) Macclesfield	30 - 19	Darlington Mowden Park
	Report

Priory Park
Attendance: 371
Referee: Richard Kelly

7 September 2013
15:00

(BP) Otley	29 - 17	Bromsgrove
	Report

Cross Green
Attendance: 317
Referee: Will Halford

7 September 2013
15:00

Sheffield Tigers	3 - 16	Preston Grasshoppers
	Report

Dore Moor
Attendance: 156
Referee: John Healy

7 September 2013
15:00

(BP) Stourbridge	24 - 7	Harrogate
	Report

Stourton Park
Attendance: 450
Referee: Luke Haskins

=== Round 2 ===
14 September 2013
14:00

Birmingham & Solihull	29 - 21	Leicester Lions
	Report

Portway
Attendance: 180
Referee: James Sullivan

14 September 2013
14:30

(BP) Preston Grasshoppers	29 - 24	Sedgley Park (BP)
	Report

Lightfoot Green
Attendance: 507
Referee: Graham Dickens

14 September 2013
15:00

Bromsgrove	12 - 28	Luctonians
	Report

Finstall Park
Attendance: 250
Referee: Andrew Taylorson

14 September 2013
15:00

(BP) Caldy	12 - 14	Chester
	Report

Paton Field
Attendance: 309
Referee: Karl Kirkpatrick

14 September 2013
15:00

Dudley Kingswinford	17 - 71	Stourbridge (BP)
	Report

Heathbrook
Attendance: 1,000
Referee: Marcus Caton

14 September 2013
15:00

Hull	12 - 39	Darlington Mowden Park (BP)
	Report

Ferens Ground
Attendance: 192
Referee: Will Halford

14 September 2013
15:00

(BP) Harrogate	24 - 27	Otley
	Report

Claro Road
Attendance: 700
Referee: Jamie Leahy

14 September 2013
15:00

Sheffield Tigers	5 - 39	Macclesfield (BP)
	Report

Dore Moor
Attendance: 146
Referee: Guy Steel Bodger

=== Round 3 ===
21 September 2013
14:00

Leicester Lions	18 - 13	Caldy
	Report

Westleigh Park
Attendance: 117
Referee: Guy Steel Bodger

21 September 2013
14:30

(BP) Sedgley Park	29 - 17	Sheffield Tigers
	Report

Park Lane
Attendance: 258
Referee: Brendan McGaffney

21 September 2013
15:00

(BP) Chester	26 - 5	Preston Grasshoppers
	Report

Hare Lane
Attendance: 320
Referee: Andy Rawson

21 September 2013
15:00

(BP) Darlington Mowden Park	48 - 21	Bromsgrove
	Report

The Northern Echo Arena
Attendance: 720
Referee: Wayne Falla

21 September 2013
15:00

(BP) Luctonians	32 - 31	Harrogate (BP)
	Report

Mortimer Park
Attendance: 410

21 September 2013
15:00

(BP) Macclesfield	36 - 26	Hull (BP)
	Report

Priory Park
Attendance: 297
Referee: Gareth Holsgrove

21 September 2013
15:00

(BP) Otley	36 - 19	Dudley Kingswinford
	Report

Cross Green
Attendance: 369
Referee: Brendan Fitzmaurice

21 September 2013
15:00

(BP) Stourbridge	32 - 10	Birmingham & Solihull
	Report

Stourton Park
Attendance: 650
Referee: Jamie Leahy

=== Round 4 ===
28 September 2013
14:00

Birmingham & Solihull	24 - 21	Otley (BP)
	Report

Portway
Attendance: 188
Referee: Brendan McGaffney

28 September 2013
14:30

Preston Grasshoppers	23 - 16	Leicester Lions (BP)
	Report

Lightfoot Green
Attendance: 257
Referee: Jamie Leahy

28 September 2013
14:30

Sedgley Park	21 - 37	Macclesfield (BP)
	Report

Park Lane
Attendance: 245
Referee: Will Halford

28 September 2013
15:00

Bromsgrove	22 - 19	Hull (BP)
	Report

Finstall Park
Attendance: 195
Referee: Karl Kirkpatrick

28 September 2013
15:00

Caldy	21 - 55	Stourbridge (BP)
	Report

Paton Field
Attendance: 223
Referee: Matthew O'Grady

28 September 2013
15:00

(2BP) Dudley Kingswinford	24 - 30	Luctonians (BP)
	Report

Heathbrook
Attendance: 250
Referee: Andy Rawson

28 September 2013
15:00

Harrogate	17 - 34	Darlington Mowden Park (BP)
	Report

Claro Road
Attendance: 280
Referee: Brendan Fitzmaurice

28 September 2013
15:00

Sheffield Tigers	21 - 31	Chester (BP)
	Report

Dore Moor
Attendance: 138
Referee: Graham Dickens

=== Round 5 ===
5 October 2013
14:00

(BP) Leicester Lions	34 - 22	Sheffield Tigers
	Report

Westleigh Park
Attendance: 127
Referee: Veryan Boscawen

5 October 2013
14:00

(BP) Macclesfield	43 - 34	Bromsgrove (BP)
	Report

Priory Park
Attendance: 283
Referee: Luke Haskins

5 October 2013
15:00

Chester	22 - 42	Sedgley Park (BP)
	Report

Hare Lane
Attendance: 340
Referee: Max Marsden

5 October 2013
15:00

(BP) Darlington Mowden Park	86 - 7	Dudley Kingswinford
	Report

The Northern Echo Arena
Attendance: 750
Referee: Will Halford

5 October 2013
15:00

(BP) Hull	23 - 30	Harrogate
	Report

Ferens Ground
Attendance: 150
Referee: Graham Dickens

5 October 2013
15:00

Luctonians	22 - 15	Birmingham & Solihull (BP)
	Report

Mortimer Park
Attendance: 465
Referee: Nick Williams

5 October 2013
15:00

(BP) Otley	31 - 27	Caldy (BP)
	Report

Cross Green
Attendance: 218
Referee: Llyr Apgeraint-Roberts

5 October 2013
15:00

(BP) Stourbridge	44 - 6	Preston Grasshoppers
	Report

Stourton Park
Attendance: 631
Referee: Gareth Holsgrove

=== Round 6 ===
12 October 2013
14:00

(BP) Birmingham & Solihull	21 - 28	Darlington Mowden Park (BP)
	Report

Portway
Attendance: 200
Referee: Alex Manley

12 October 2013
14:30

(BP) Preston Grasshoppers	37 - 22	Otley
	Report

Lightfoot Green
Attendance: 358
Referee: Brendan Fitzmaurice

12 October 2013
14:30

(BP) Sedgley Park	38 - 33	Leicester Lions (2BP)
	Report

Park Lane
Attendance: 257
Referee: Andy Rawson

12 October 2013
15:00

Caldy	30 - 22	Luctonians (BP)
	Report

Paton Field
Attendance: 321
Referee: Jamie Leahy

12 October 2013
15:00

(BP) Chester	14 - 15	Macclesfield
	Report

Hare Lane
Attendance: 625
Referee: Darren Gamage

12 October 2013
15:00

(BP) Dudley Kingswinford	20 - 25	Hull
	Report

Heathbrook
Attendance: 270
Referee: Luke Haskins

12 October 2013
15:00

(BP) Harrogate	39 - 12	Bromsgrove
	Report

Claro Road
Attendance: 280
Referee: Will Halford

12 October 2013
15:00

(BP) Sheffield Tigers	14 - 17	Stourbridge
	Report

Dore Moor
Attendance: 143
Referee: Brendan McGaffney

=== Round 7 ===
19 October 2013
14:00

Leicester Lions	14 - 0	Chester
	Report

Westleigh Park
Attendance: 129
Referee: Jamie Leahy

19 October 2013
15:00

(BP) Bromsgrove	32 - 25	Dudley Kingswinford (2BP)
	Report

Finstall Park
Attendance: 350
Referee: Phil Watters

19 October 2013
15:00

(BP) Darlington Mowden Park	38 - 5	Caldy
	Report

The Northern Echo Arena
Attendance: 625
Referee: Brendan Fitzmaurice

19 October 2013
15:00

Hull	21 - 32	Birmingham & Solihull (BP)
	Report

Ferens Ground
Attendance: 150
Referee: Brendan McGaffney

19 October 2013
15:00

(BP) Luctonians	18 - 19	Preston Grasshoppers
	Report

Mortimer Park
Attendance: 450
Referee: Guy Steel Bodger

19 October 2013
15:00

(BP) Macclesfield	42 - 28	Harrogate
	Report

Priory Park
Attendance: 314
Referee: Llyr Apgeraint-Roberts

19 October 2013
15:00

(BP) Otley	40 - 16	Sheffield Tigers
	Report

Cross Green
Attendance: 376
Referee: Karl Kirkpatrick

19 October 2013
15:00

Stourbridge	7 - 0	Sedgley Park (BP)
	Report

Stourton Park
Attendance: 610
Referee: Tom Davis

=== Round 8 ===
26 October 2013
14:00

(BP) Birmingham & Solihull	40 - 12	Bromsgrove
	Report

Portway
Attendance: 240
Referee: Graham Wells

26 October 2013
14:00

Leicester Lions	20 - 46	Macclesfield (BP)
	Report

Westleigh Park
Attendance: 117
Referee: Gordon Corry

26 October 2013
14:30

Preston Grasshoppers	10 - 34	Darlington Mowden Park (BP)
	Report

Lightfoot Green
Attendance: 307
Referee: Brendan McGaffney

26 October 2013
14:30

(BP) Sedgley Park	44 - 23	Otley
	Report

Park Lane
Attendance: 307
Referee: Karl Kirkpatrick

26 October 2013
15:00

(BP) Caldy	49 - 17	Hull
	Report

Paton Field
Attendance: 197
Referee: Guy Steel Bodger

26 October 2013
15:00

Chester	15 - 23	Stourbridge
	Report

Hare Lane
Attendance: 340
Referee: Gareth Holsgrove

26 October 2013
15:00

Dudley Kingswinford	22 - 47	Harrogate (BP)
	Report

Heathbrook
Attendance: 200
Referee: Graham Dickens

26 October 2013
15:00

(BP) Sheffield Tigers	29 - 5	Luctonians
	Report

Dore Moor
Attendance: 107
Referee: Jonathan Kaplan

=== Round 9 ===
2 November 2013
14:00

(BP) Harrogate	34 - 27	Birmingham & Solihull (2BP)
	Report

Claro Road
Attendance: 150
Referee: Brendan McGaffney

2 November 2013
14:00

Hull	22 - 30	Preston Grasshoppers (BP)
	Report

Ferens Ground
Attendance: 150
Referee: Matthew O'Grady

2 November 2013
14:00

Leicester Lions	3 - 20	Stourbridge
	Report

Westleigh Park
Attendance: 143
Referee: Andy Rawson

2 November 2013
14:00

(BP) Otley	27 - 31	Chester
	Report

Cross Green
Attendance: 253
Referee: Llyr Apgeraint-Roberts

2 November 2013
14:15

Bromsgrove	28 - 3	Caldy
	Report

Finstall Park
Attendance: 200
Referee: Karl Kirkpatrick

2 November 2013
14:15

(BP) Luctonians	12 - 18	Sedgley Park
	Report

Mortimer Park
Attendance: 300
Referee: Andrew Taylorson

2 November 2013
15:00

(BP) Darlington Mowden Park	51 - 3	Sheffield Tigers
	Report

The Northern Echo Arena
Attendance: 510
Referee: Will Halford

2 November 2013
15:00

(BP) Macclesfield	73 - 3	Dudley Kingswinford
	Report

Priory Park
Attendance: 248
Referee: James Clarke

=== Round 10 ===
9 November 2013
14:00

(BP) Birmingham & Solihull	70 - 12	Dudley Kingswinford
	Report

Portway
Attendance: 198
Referee: Karl Kirkpatrick

9 November 2013
14:00

Leicester Lions	21 - 9	Otley
	Report

Westleigh Park
Attendance: 117
Referee: Veryan Boscawen

9 November 2013
14:00

(BP) Sheffield Tigers	16 - 18	Hull
	Report

Dore Moor
Attendance: 101
Referee: Brendan Fitzmaurice

9 November 2013
14:15

(BP) Caldy	24 - 17	Harrogate (BP)
	Report

Paton Field
Attendance: 173
Referee: Graham Dickens

9 November 2013
14:30

Preston Grasshoppers	22 - 5	Bromsgrove
	Report

Lightfoot Green
Attendance: 337
Referee: Mick Harris

9 November 2013
14:30

Sedgley Park	23 - 21	Darlington Mowden Park (BP)
	Report

Park Lane
Attendance: 302
Referee: Guy Steel Bodger

9 November 2013
15:00

(BP) Chester	32 - 10	Luctonians
	Report

Hare Lane
Attendance: 320
Referee: Jamie Leahy

9 November 2013
15:00

(BP) Stourbridge	16 - 19	Macclesfield
	Report

Stourton Park
Attendance: 900
Referee: Marcus Caton

=== Round 11 ===
16 November 2013
14:00

(BP) Harrogate	45 - 40	Preston Grasshoppers (2BP)
	Report

Claro Road
Attendance: 215
Referee: Peter Stentiford

16 November 2013
14:00

Hull	18 - 29	Sedgley Park (BP)
	Report

Ferens Ground
Attendance: 150
Referee: Clare Hodnett

16 November 2013
14:15

Bromsgrove	31 - 19	Sheffield Tigers
	Report

Finstall Park
Attendance: 150
Referee: Brendan McGaffney

16 November 2013
14:15

Dudley Kingswinford	17 - 43	Caldy (BP)
	Report

Heathbrook
Attendance: 160
Referee: Gordon Corry

16 November 2013
14:15

Otley	27 - 35	Stourbridge (BP)
	Report

Cross Green
Attendance: 380
Referee: Wayne Falla

16 November 2013
14:15

Luctonians	25 - 16	Leicester Lions
	Report

Mortimer Park
Attendance: 370
Referee: Mike Hudson

16 November 2013
15:00

Darlington Mowden Park	20 - 13	Chester (BP)
	Report

The Northern Echo Arena
Attendance: 520
Referee: Andrew Taylorson

16 November 2013
15:00

Macclesfield	17 - 32	Birmingham & Solihull (BP)
	Report

Priory Park
Attendance: 334
Referee: Nick Williams

=== Round 12 ===
23 November 2013
14:00

Leicester Lions	17 - 62	Darlington Mowden Park (BP)
	Report

Westleigh Park
Attendance: 113
Referee: Rob Warburton

23 November 2013
14:00

Sheffield Tigers	17 - 16	Harrogate (BP)
	Report

Dore Moor
Attendance: 109
Referee: Matthew O'Grady

23 November 2013
14:15

(BP) Caldy	39 - 3	Birmingham & Solihull
	Report

Paton Field
Attendance: 219
Referee: Andy Rawson

23 November 2013
14:15

Otley	11 - 27	Macclesfield (BP)
	Report

Cross Green
Attendance: 304
Referee: Will Halford

23 November 2013
14:30

(BP) Preston Grasshoppers	35 - 12	Dudley Kingswinford
	Report

Lightfoot Green
Attendance: 267
Referee: Karl Kirkpatrick

23 November 2013
14:30

(BP) Sedgley Park	90 - 5	Bromsgrove
	Report

Park Lane
Attendance: 175
Referee: Jamie Leahy

23 November 2013
15:00

Chester	23 - 14	Hull
	Report

Hare Lane
Attendance: 452
Referee: Brendan McGaffney

23 November 2013
15:00

(BP) Stourbridge	57 - 12	Luctonians
	Report

Stourton Park
Attendance: 560
Referee: Luke Haskins

=== Round 13 ===
30 November 2013
14:00

(BP) Birmingham & Solihull	29 - 24	Preston Grasshoppers (2BP)
	Report

Portway
Attendance: 166
Referee: Clare Hodnett

30 November 2013
14:00

Harrogate	28 - 37	Sedgley Park (BP)
	Report

Claro Road
Attendance: 200
Referee: Will Halford

30 November 2013
14:00

Hull	14 - 10	Leicester Lions (BP)
	Report

Ferens Ground
Attendance: 165
Referee: Jamie Leahy

30 November 2013
14:15

(BP) Dudley Kingswinford	15 - 18	Sheffield Tigers
	Report

Heathbrook
Attendance: 250
Referee: Fergus Kirby

30 November 2013
14:15

(BP) Luctonians	17 - 23	Otley
	Report

Mortimer Park
Attendance: 370
Referee: Phil Watters

30 November 2013
15:00

Bromsgrove	7 - 27	Chester (BP)
	Report

Finstall Park
Attendance: 200
Referee: Luke Haskins

30 November 2013
15:00

(BP) Darlington Mowden Park	38 - 8	Stourbridge
	Report

The Northern Echo Arena
Attendance: 1,005
Referee: Andrew Taylorson

30 November 2013
15:00

(BP) Macclesfield	52 - 15	Caldy
	Report

Priory Park
Attendance: 355
Referee: Sam Grove-White

=== Round 14 ===
7 December 2013
14:00

(BP) Leicester Lions	55 - 25	Bromsgrove
	Report

Westleigh Park
Attendance: 129
Referee: Sara Cox

7 December 2013
14:00

Otley	5 - 31	Darlington Mowden Park (BP)
	Report

Cross Green
Attendance: 268
Referee: Will Halford

7 December 2013
14:00

(BP) Sheffield Tigers	14 - 18	Birmingham & Solihull
	Report

Dore Moor
Attendance: 115
Referee: Peter Stentiford

7 December 2013
14:15

Luctonians	10 - 69	Macclesfield (BP)
	Report

Mortimer Park
Attendance: 301
Referee: David Procter

7 December 2013
14:30

(BP) Preston Grasshoppers	16 - 18	Caldy
	Report

Lightfoot Green
Attendance: 372
Referee: Graham Dickens

7 December 2013
14:30

(BP) Sedgley Park	111 - 15	Dudley Kingswinford
	Report

Park Lane
Attendance: 220
Referee: Karl Kirkpatrick

7 December 2013
15:00

(BP) Chester	31 - 13	Harrogate
	Report

Hare Lane
Attendance: 415
Referee: Jamie Leahy

7 December 2013
15:00

(BP) Stourbridge	54 - 0	Hull
	Report

Stourton Park
Attendance: 425
Referee: Brendan McGaffney

=== Round 15 ===
14 December 2013
14:00

Birmingham & Solihull	20 - 40	Sedgley Park (BP)
	Report

Portway
Attendance: 247
Referee: Andrew Taylorson

14 December 2013
14:00

(BP) Harrogate	20 - 25	Leicester Lions (BP)
	Report

Claro Road
Attendance: 225
Referee: Mick Harris

14 December 2013
14:00

Hull	12 - 3	Otley
	Report

Ferens Ground
Attendance: 90
Referee: James Clarke

14 December 2013
14:15

Caldy	20 - 11	Sheffield Tigers
	Report

Paton Field
Attendance: 273
Referee: Brendan Fitzmaurice

14 December 2013
14:15

Dudley Kingswinford	5 - 36	Chester (BP)
	Report

Heathbrook
Attendance: 150

14 December 2013
15:00

Bromsgrove	7 - 41	Stourbridge (BP)
	Report

Finstall Park
Attendance: 400
Referee: Phil Watters

14 December 2013
15:00

(BP) Darlington Mowden Park	54 - 0	Luctonians
	Report

The Northern Echo Arena
Attendance: 615

14 December 2013
15:00

(BP) Macclesfield	25 - 3	Preston Grasshoppers
	Report

Priory Park
Attendance: 279
Referee: Andy Rawson

=== Round 16 ===
21 December 2013
14:00

(BP) Leicester Lions	5 - 7	Birmingham & Solihull
	Report

Westleigh Park
Attendance: 123
Referee: Luke Haskins

21 December 2013
14:00

Otley	9 - 25	Harrogate (BP)
	Report

Cross Green
Attendance: 817
Referee: Llyr Apgeraint-Roberts

21 December 2013
14:15

(BP) Chester	36 - 19	Caldy
	Report

Hare Lane
Attendance: 635
Referee: Peter Stentiford

21 December 2013
14:15

(BP) Luctonians	24 - 5	Bromsgrove
	Report

Mortimer Park
Attendance: 470
Referee: Clare Hodnett

21 December 2013
14:30

(BP) Sedgley Park	39 - 14	Preston Grasshoppers
	Report

Park Lane
Attendance: 351
Referee: Will Halford

21 December 2013
15:00

(BP) Darlington Mowden Park	52 - 7	Hull
	Report

The Northern Echo Arena
Attendance: 1,026
Referee: Karl Kirkpatrick

21 December 2013
15:00

Macclesfield	21 - 20	Sheffield Tigers (BP)
	Report

Priory Park
Attendance: 395
Referee: Brendan McGaffney

21 December 2013
15:00

(BP) Stourbridge	55 - 0	Dudley Kingswinford
	Report

Stourton Park
Attendance: 950
Referee: Guy Steel Bodger

=== Round 17 ===
4 January 2014
14:00

Birmingham & Solihull	7 - 19	Stourbridge
	Report

Portway
Attendance: 420
Referee: Tom Davis

4 January 2014
14:00

Harrogate	18 - 15	Luctonians
	Report

Claro Road
Attendance: 230
Referee: Mick Harris

4 January 2014
14:00

Hull	17 - 37	Macclesfield (BP)
	Report

Ferens Ground
Attendance: 110
Referee: Will Halford

4 January 2014
14:00

Sheffield Tigers	15 - 12	Sedgley Park (BP)
	Report

Dore Moor
Attendance: 97
Referee: Jamie Leahy

4 January 2014
14:15

Bromsgrove	15 - 29	Darlington Mowden Park (BP)
	Report

Finstall Park
Attendance: 250
Referee: Gareth Holsgrove

4 January 2014
14:15

(BP) Caldy	31 - 18	Leicester Lions
	Report

Paton Field
Attendance: 216
Referee: Clare Hodnett

4 January 2014
14:15

Dudley Kingswinford	7 - 60	Otley (BP)
	Report

Heathbrook
Attendance: 130
Referee: Graham Dickens

4 January 2014
14:30

Preston Grasshoppers	13 - 23	Chester
	Report

Lightfoot Green
Attendance: 311
Referee: Matthew O'Grady

=== Round 18 ===
11 January 2014
15:00

(BP) Chester	20 - 13	Sheffield Tigers (BP)
	Report

Hare Lane
Attendance: 377
Referee: Karl Kirkpatrick

11 January 2014
15:00

(BP) Darlington Mowden Park	38 - 20	Harrogate
	Report

The Northern Echo Arena
Attendance: 680
Referee: Brendan McGaffney

11 January 2014
15:00

(BP) Hull	37 - 13	Bromsgrove
	Report

Ferens Ground
Attendance: 150
Referee: Jamie Leahy

11 January 2014
15:00

(BP) Leicester Lions	47 - 15	Preston Grasshoppers
	Report

Westleigh Park
Attendance: 105
Referee: James Clarke

11 January 2014
15:00

(BP) Luctonians	72 - 0	Dudley Kingswinford
	Report

Mortimer Park
Attendance: 272

11 January 2014
15:00

Otley	12 - 48	Birmingham & Solihull (BP)
	Report

Cross Green
Attendance: 341

11 January 2014
15:00

(BP) Macclesfield	19 - 23	Sedgley Park
	Report

Priory Park
Attendance: 385
Referee: Andrew Taylorson

11 January 2014
15:00

(BP) Stourbridge	46 - 12	Caldy
	Report

Stourton Park
Attendance: 525
Referee: Gareth Holsgrove

=== Round 19 ===
18 January 2014
14:00

Birmingham & Solihull	23 - 15	Luctonians (BP)
	Report

Portway
Attendance: 257
Referee: Ryan Smith

18 January 2014
14:00

Harrogate	19 - 18	Hull (BP)
	Report

Claro Road
Attendance: 270
Referee: Will Halford

18 January 2014
14:00

Sheffield Tigers	27 - 21	Leicester Lions (BP)
	Report

Dore Moor
Attendance: 128
Referee: Chris Bennett

18 January 2014
14:15

(BP) Caldy	26 - 25	Otley (2BP)
	Report

Paton Field
Attendance: 300
Referee: Graham Dickens

18 January 2014
14:15

Dudley Kingswinford	10 - 53	Darlington Mowden Park (BP)
	Report

Heathbrook
Attendance: 155
Referee: Max Marsden

18 January 2014
15:00

Bromsgrove	5 - 43	Macclesfield (BP)
	Report

Finstall Park
Attendance: 175
Referee: Alex Manley

18 January 2014
15:00

Preston Grasshoppers	13 - 31	Stourbridge (BP)
	Report

Lightfoot Green
Attendance: 431
Referee: Luke Haskins

18 January 2014
15:00

(BP) Sedgley Park	43 - 14	Chester
	Report

Park Lane
Attendance: 239
Referee: Andy Rawson

=== Round 20 ===
25 January 2014
14:00

(BP) Hull	62 - 0	Dudley Kingswinford
	Report

Ferens Ground
Attendance: 150
Referee: Brendan Fitzmaurice

25 January 2014
14:00

(BP) Leicester Lions	34 - 10	Sedgley Park
	Report

Westleigh Park
Attendance: 114
Referee: Jamie Leahy

25 January 2014
14:15

(BP) Bromsgrove	17 - 23	Harrogate
	Report

Finstall Park
Attendance: 200
Referee: Karl Kirkpatrick

25 January 2014
14:15

(BP) Otley	12 - 13	Preston Grasshoppers
	Report

Cross Green
Attendance: 347
Referee: Will Halford

25 January 2014
15:00

Darlington Mowden Park	15 - 13	Birmingham & Solihull (BP)
	Report

Northern Echo Arena
Attendance: 721
Referee: Marcus Caton

25 January 2014
15:00

(BP) Macclesfield	30 - 6	Chester
	Report

Priory Park
Attendance: 385
Referee: Luke Haskins

25 January 2014
15:00

(BP) Stourbridge	31 - 7	Sheffield Tigers
	Report

Stourton Park
Attendance: 500
Referee: Brendan McGaffney

25 January 2014

Luctonians	P - P	Caldy

- Postponed. Game rescheduled to 22 February 2014.

=== Round 21 ===
1 February 2014
14:15

Caldy	5 - 19	Darlington Mowden Park
	Report

Paton Field
Attendance: 178
Referee: Jamie Leahy

1 February 2014
14:15

Dudley Kingswinford	5 - 41	Bromsgrove (BP)
	Report

Heathbrook
Attendance: 245
Referee: Veryan Boscawen

1 February 2014
14:30

(BP) Preston Grasshoppers	7 - 10	Luctonians
	Report

Lightfoot Green
Attendance: 351
Referee: Chris Bennett

1 February 2014
14:30

Sedgley Park	3 - 45	Stourbridge (BP)
	Report

Park Lane
Attendance: 207
Referee: Will Halford

1 February 2014
15:00

Chester	12 - 7	Leicester Lions (BP)
	Report

Hare Lane
Attendance: 289
Referee: Brendan McGaffney

1 February 2014

Birmingham & Solihull	P - P	Hull

- Postponed. Game rescheduled to 22 February 2014.

1 February 2014

Harrogate	P - P	Macclesfield

- Postponed. Game rescheduled to 22 February 2014.

1 February 2014

Sheffield Tigers	P - P	Otley

- Postponed. Game rescheduled to 22 February 2014.

=== Round 22 ===
8 February 2014
14:00

(BP) Harrogate	38 - 7	Dudley Kingswinford
	Report

Claro Road
Attendance: 180
Referee: Brendan Fitzmaurice

8 February 2014
14:00

(BP) Hull	33 - 26	Caldy (2BP)
	Report

Ferens Ground
Attendance: 150
Referee: Karl Kirkpatrick

8 February 2014
14:15

Otley	14 - 12	Sedgley Park (BP)
	Report

Cross Green
Attendance: 302
Referee: Mick Harris

8 February 2014
15:00

(BP) Darlington Mowden Park	24 - 11	Preston Grasshoppers
	Report

The Northern Echo Arena
Attendance: 610
Referee: Veryan Boscawen

8 February 2014
15:00

(BP) Macclesfield	32 - 17	Leicester Lions
	Report

Priory Park
Attendance: 287
Referee: Will Halford

8 February 2014
15:00

Stourbridge	14 - 0	Chester
	Report

Stourton Park
Attendance: 420
Referee: Marcus Caton

8 February 2014

Bromsgrove	P - P	Birmingham & Solihull

- Postponed. Game rescheduled to 15 March 2014.

8 February 2014

Luctonians	P - P	Sheffield Tigers

- Postponed. Game rescheduled to 15 March 2014.

=== Round 23 ===
15 February 2014
14:15

(BP) Caldy	31 - 13	Bromsgrove
	Report

Paton Field
Attendance: 132
Referee: Graham Dickens

15 February 2014
14:15

Dudley Kingswinford	3 - 26	Macclesfield (BP)
	Report

Heathbrook
Attendance: 210
Referee: Gareth Holsgrove

15 February 2014
15:00

Chester	10 - 8	Otley (BP)
	Report

Hare Lane
Attendance: 365
Referee: Clare Hodnett

15 February 2014
15:00

(BP) Stourbridge	38 - 0	Leicester Lions
	Report

Stourton Park
Attendance: 370
Referee: Jamie Leahy

15 February 2014

Birmingham & Solihull	P - P	Harrogate

- Postponed. Game rescheduled to 19 April 2014.

15 February 2014

Preston Grasshoppers	P - P	Hull

- Postponed. Game rescheduled to 15 March 2014.

15 February 2014

Sedgley Park	P - P	Luctonians

- Postponed. Game rescheduled to 19 April 2014.

15 February 2014

Sheffield Tigers	P - P	Darlington Mowden Park

- Postponed. Game rescheduled to 19 April 2014.

=== Rounds 20 & 21 (rescheduled games) ===
22 February 2014
14:00

Birmingham & Solihull	28 - 15	Hull
	Report

Portway
Attendance: 180
Referee: Mike Hudson

- Game rescheduled from 1 February 2014.

22 February 2014
14:00

Harrogate	19 - 49	Macclesfield (BP)
	Report

Claro Road
Attendance: 150
Referee: Wayne Falla

- Game rescheduled from 1 February 2014.

22 February 2014
14:00

Sheffield Tigers	11 - 20	Otley
	Report

Dore Moor
Attendance: 117
Referee: Andrew Jackson

- Game rescheduled from 1 February 2014.

22 February 2014
14:15

Luctonians	23 - 20	Caldy (BP)
	Report

Mortimer Park
Attendance: 251
Referee: Gareth Holsgrove

- Game rescheduled from 25 January 2014.

=== Round 24 ===
1 March 2014
14:00

(BP) Hull	39 - 16	Sheffield Tigers
	Report

Ferens Ground
Attendance: 150
Referee: Brendan Fitzmaurice

1 March 2014
14:15

Bromsgrove	13 - 29	Preston Grasshoppers (BP)
	Report

Finstall Park
Attendance: 314
Referee: James Clarke

1 March 2014
15:00

Darlington Mowden Park	17 - 13	Sedgley Park (BP)
	Report

The Northern Echo Arena
Attendance: 740
Referee: Andy Rawson

1 March 2014
15:00

Dudley Kingswinford	0 - 36	Birmingham & Solihull (BP)
	Report

Heathbrook
Attendance: 410
Referee: Guy Steel Bodger

1 March 2014
15:00

(BP) Harrogate	38 - 24	Caldy
	Report

Claro Road
Attendance: 250
Referee: Will Halford

1 March 2014
15:00

Luctonians	21 - 20	Chester (BP)
	Report

Mortimer Park
Attendance: 393
Referee: Andrew Taylorson

1 March 2014
15:00

(BP) Macclesfield	26 - 26	Stourbridge
	Report

Priory Park
Attendance: 512
Referee: Llyr Apgeraint-Roberts

1 March 2014
15:00

Otley	25 - 15	Leicester Lions
	Report

Cross Green
Attendance: 362
Referee: Ryan Smith

=== Round 25 ===
8 March 2014
14:00

(BP) Birmingham & Solihull	17 - 22	Macclesfield
	Report

Portway
Attendance: 320
Referee: Jamie Leahy

8 March 2014
14:00

(BP) Leicester Lions	45 - 21	Luctonians
	Report

Westleigh Park
Attendance: 129
Referee: Karl Kirkpatrick

8 March 2014
14:30

Preston Grasshoppers	15 - 25	Harrogate
	Report

Lightfoot Green
Attendance: 278
Referee: Graham Dickens

8 March 2014
14:30

(BP) Sedgley Park	32 - 30	Hull (BP)
	Report

Park Lane
Attendance: 202
Referee: Brendan McGaffney

8 March 2014
15:00

(BP) Caldy	66 - 15	Dudley Kingswinford
	Report

Paton Field
Attendance: 211
Referee: Andrew Taylorson

8 March 2014
15:00

(BP) Chester	9 - 15	Darlington Mowden Park
	Report

Hare Lane
Attendance: 750
Referee: Andy Rawson

8 March 2014
15:00

(BP) Sheffield Tigers	28 - 10	Bromsgrove
	Report

Dore Moor
Attendance: 105
Referee: Jack Makepeace

8 March 2014
15:00

(BP) Stourbridge	34 - 25	Otley
	Report

Stourton Park
Attendance: 500
Referee: Andrew Jackson

=== Rounds 22 & 23 ===
15 March 2014
14:30

(BP) Preston Grasshoppers	43 - 13	Hull
	Report

Lightfoot Green
Attendance: 203
Referee: Jack Makepeace

- Game rescheduled from 15 February 2014.

15 March 2014
15:00

(2BP) Bromsgrove	28 - 34	Birmingham & Solihull (BP)
	Report

Finstall Park
Attendance: 132
Referee: Max Marsden

- Game rescheduled from 8 February 2014.

15 March 2014
15:00

(BP) Luctonians	35 - 28	Sheffield Tigers (BP)
	Report

Mortimer Park
Attendance: 240
Referee: Andy Rawson

- Game rescheduled from 8 February 2014.

=== Round 26 ===
22 March 2014
14:00

(BP) Birmingham & Solihull	35 - 15	Caldy
	Report

Portway
Attendance: 211
Referee: Jack Makepeace

22 March 2014
15:00

Bromsgrove	14 - 24	Sedgley Park
	Report

Finstall Park
Attendance: 200
Referee: Dan Parrott

22 March 2014
15:00

(BP) Darlington Mowden Park	52 - 10	Leicester Lions
	Report

The Northern Echo Arena
Attendance: 724
Referee: Will Halford

22 March 2014
15:00

Dudley Kingswinford	0 - 32	Preston Grasshoppers (BP)
	Report

Heathbrook
Attendance: 210
Referee: Max Marsden

22 March 2014
15:00

Harrogate	20 - 5	Sheffield Tigers
	Report

Claro Road
Attendance: 280
Referee: Chris Bennett

22 March 2014
15:00

(BP) Hull	32 - 19	Chester
	Report

Ferens Ground
Attendance: 150
Referee: Brendan Fitzmaurice

22 March 2014
15:00

(BP) Luctonians	15 - 20	Stourbridge (BP)
	Report

Mortimer Park
Attendance: 443
Referee: Matthew O'Grady

22 March 2014
15:00

(BP) Macclesfield	48 - 21	Otley
	Report

Priory Park
Attendance: 375
Referee: Graham Dickens

=== Round 27 ===
29 March 2014
14:00

(BP) Leicester Lions	58 - 39	Hull (BP)
	Report

Westleigh Park
Attendance: 121
Referee: Christopher Ridley

29 March 2014
14:30

Preston Grasshoppers	16 - 8	Birmingham & Solihull
	Report

Lightfoot Green
Attendance: 367
Referee: Chris Bennett

29 March 2014
14:30

(BP) Sedgley Park	57 - 15	Harrogate
	Report

Park Lane
Attendance: 453
Referee: Jack Makepeace

29 March 2014
15:00

(BP) Chester	62 - 7	Bromsgrove
	Report

Hare Lane
Attendance: 300
Referee: Clare Hodnett

29 March 2014
15:00

(BP) Otley	17 - 19	Luctonians
	Report

Cross Green
Attendance: 594
Referee: Will Halford

29 March 2014
15:00

(BP) Sheffield Tigers	45 - 8	Dudley Kingswinford
	Report

Dore Moor
Attendance: 133
Referee: Brendan Fitzmaurice

29 March 2014
15:00

Stourbridge	14 - 5	Darlington Mowden Park
	Report

Stourton Park
Attendance: 1,200
Referee: Philip Davis

29 March 2014
15:30

(BP) Caldy	29 - 47	Macclesfield (BP)
	Report

Paton Field
Attendance: 236
Referee: Karl Kirkpatrick

=== Round 28 ===
5 April 2014
14:00

(BP) Birmingham & Solihull	48 - 0	Sheffield Tigers
	Report

Portway
Attendance: 167
Referee: Christopher Ridley

5 April 2014
15:00

Bromsgrove	18 - 39	Leicester Lions (BP)
	Report

Finstall Park
Attendance: 125
Referee: James Sullivan

5 April 2014
15:00

Caldy	22 - 21	Preston Grasshoppers (BP)
	Report

Paton Field
Attendance: 212
Referee: James Munroe

5 April 2014
15:00

(BP) Darlington Mowden Park	37 - 24	Otley (BP)
	Report

The Northern Echo Arena
Attendance: 697
Referee: Wayne Falla

5 April 2014
15:00

Dudley Kingswinford	14 - 48	Sedgley Park (BP)
	Report

Heathbrook
Attendance: 160
Referee: Andy Rawson

5 April 2014
15:00

(BP) Harrogate	15 - 17	Chester
	Report

Claro Road
Attendance: 250
Referee: Will Halford

5 April 2014
15:00

(BP) Hull	29 - 38	Stourbridge (BP)
	Report

Ferens Ground
Attendance: 150
Referee: Llyr Apgeraint-Roberts

5 April 2014
15:00

(BP) Macclesfield	59 - 5	Luctonians
	Report

Priory Park
Attendance: 357
Referee: Brendan McGaffney

=== Round 29 ===
12 April 2014
14:00

(BP) Leicester Lions	41 - 36	Harrogate (2BP)
	Report

Westleigh Park
Attendance: 130

12 April 2014
14:30

Preston Grasshoppers	17 - 28	Macclesfield (BP)
	Report

Lightfoot Green
Attendance: 417
Referee: Luke Haskins

12 April 2014
14:30

(BP) Sedgley Park	34 - 20	Birmingham & Solihull
	Report

Park Lane
Attendance: 203
Referee: Marcus Caton

12 April 2014
15:00

(BP) Chester	65 - 22	Dudley Kingswinford
	Report

Hare Lane
Attendance: 378
Referee: Will Halford

12 April 2014
15:00

Luctonians	18 - 26	Darlington Mowden Park
	Report

Mortimer Park
Attendance: 402
Referee: Karl Kirkpatrick

12 April 2014
15:00

(BP) Otley	45 - 0	Hull
	Report

Cross Green
Attendance: 273
Referee: David Parsons

12 April 2014
15:00

Sheffield Tigers	19 - 28	Caldy (BP)
	Report

Dore Moor
Attendance: 159
Referee: Clare Hodnett

12 April 2014
15:00

(BP) Stourbridge	78 - 6	Bromsgrove
	Report

Stourton Park
Attendance: 600
Referee: James Clarke

=== Round 23 (rescheduled games) ===
19 April 2014
14:00

Sheffield Tigers	5 - 69	Darlington Mowden Park (BP)
	Report

Dore Moor
Attendance: 125
Referee: Will Halford

- Game rescheduled from 15 February 2014.

19 April 2014
14:45

(BP) Sedgley Park	45 - 12	Luctonians
	Report

Park Lane
Attendance: 217
Referee: Brendan Fitzmaurice

- Game rescheduled from 15 February 2014.

19 April 2014
15:00

(BP) Birmingham & Solihull	24 - 33	Harrogate (BP)
	Report

Portway
Attendance: 261
Referee: Andrew Taylorson

- Game rescheduled from 15 February 2014.

=== Round 30 ===
26 April 2014
14:00

Birmingham & Solihull	10 - 9	Chester (BP)
	Report

Portway
Attendance: 540
Referee: James Munro

26 April 2014
14:30

(BP) Preston Grasshoppers	22 - 24	Sheffield Tigers (BP)
	Report

Lightfoot Green
Attendance: 437
Referee: Brendan McGaffney

26 April 2014
15:00

(BP) Bromsgrove	12 - 19	Otley
	Report

Finstall Park
Attendance: 200
Referee: Karl Kirkpatrick

26 April 2014
15:00

(BP) Caldy	34 - 15	Sedgley Park
	Report

Paton Field
Attendance: 398
Referee: Will Halford

26 April 2014
15:00

(BP) Darlington Mowden Park	28 - 24	Macclesfield (2BP)
	Report

The Northern Echo Arena
Attendance: 3,750
Referee: Marcus Caton

26 April 2014
15:00

Dudley Kingswinford	0 - 74	Leicester Lions (BP)
	Report

Heathbrook
Attendance: 200
Referee: Dave Clarkson

26 April 2014
15:00

Harrogate	19 - 41	Stourbridge (BP)
	Report

Claro Road
Attendance: 390
Referee: Andy Rawson

26 April 2014
15:00

(BP) Hull	27 - 38	Luctonians (BP)
	Report

Ferens Ground
Attendance: 150
Referee: Mick Harris

=== Promotion play–off ===
Each season, the runners–up in the National League 2 South and National League 2 North participate in a play–off for promotion into National Division 1. Darlington Mowden Park were runners-up in the North and as they had a better record than the 2013–14 National League 2 South runners-up, Ampthill, they hosted the play–off match. The game was played on 3 May 2014 at The Northern Echo Arena and finished 25 – 25 after normal time, so went to two 10-minute periods of extra time. The game was won with a try scored by DMP in the 3rd minute of added on time. As a result, they will play in National League 1 in the 2014–15 season for the first time.

3 May 2014
15:00

Darlington Mowden Park	30 – 28 a.e.t.	Ampthill
	Darlington MP; Ampthill

The Northern Echo Arena
Attendance: 975
Referee: Wayne Falla

== Total season attendances ==
- Figures not including north-south promotion playoff.

Club	Home Games	Total	Average	Highest	Lowest	% Capacity
Birmingham & Solihull	15	3,775	252	540	166	
Bromsgrove	15	3,341	223	400	125	
Caldy	15	3,598	240	398	132	6%
Chester	15	6,281	419	750	289	21%
Darlington Mowden Park	15	13,693	913	3,750	510	4%
Dudley Kingswinford	15	4,000	267	1,000	130	10%
Harrogate	15	4,050	270	700	150	6%
Hull	15	2,207	147	192	90	10%
Leicester Lions	15	1,825	122	141	105	6%
Luctonians	15	5,745	383	608	240	15%
Macclesfield	15	5,177	345	512	248	31%
Otley	15	5,521	368	817	218	5%
Preston Grasshoppers	15	5,200	347	507	203	15%
Sedgley Park	15	3,846	256	453	175	9%
Sheffield Tigers	15	1,879	125	159	97	13%
Stourbridge	15	9,291	619	1,200	370	18%

== Individual statistics ==
- Note that points scorers includes tries as well as conversions, penalties and drop goals.

=== Top points scorers ===
Rank	Player	Team	Appearances	Points
1	(England) Stephen Collins	Sedgley Park	29	298
2	(England) Mark Ireland	Otley	26	272
3	(England) James Hearn	Stourbridge	28	268
4	(England) Jon Boden	Leicester Lions	24	220
5	(England) Richard Vasey	Caldy	28	209
6	(England) Joe Rowntree	Harrogate	30	209
7	(England) Tom Eaton	Macclesfield	30	205
8	(England) Adam Canning	Birmingham & Solihull	20	172
9	(England) Ryan Parkinson	Macclesfield	27	160
10	(England) James Cameron	Hull	28	145

=== Top try scorers ===
Rank	Player	Team	Appearances	Tries
1	(England) Ryan Parkinson	Macclesfield	27	32
2	(England) Edward Stobart	Macclesfield	26	23
3	(England) Nathan Bressington	Stourbridge	22	22
4	(England) Drew Cheshire	Luctonians	27	21
4	(England) Matthew Lamprey	Sedgley Park	29	21
5	(England) Andrew Riley	Sedgley Park	27	20
6	(England) Johnny Matthews	Sedgley Park	25	17
6	(England) Elliot Brierley	Macclesfield	27	17
7	(England) Henry Robinson	Darlington Mowden Park	21	16
7	(England) Stefan Shillingford	Stourbridge	28	16

== Season records ==
=== Team ===
Largest home win — 96 pts

111 - 15 Sedgley Park at home to Dudley Kingswinford on 7 December 2013

Largest away win — 74 pts

74 - 0 Leicester Lions away to Dudley Kingswinford on 26 April 2014

Most points scored — 111 pts

111 - 15 Sedgley Park at home to Dudley Kingswinford on 7 December 2013

Most tries in a match — 17

Sedgley Park at home to Dudley Kingswinford on 7 December 2013

Most conversions in a match — 13

Sedgley Park at home to Dudley Kingswinford on 7 December 2013

Most penalties in a match — 6 (x2)

Otley away to Sedgley Park on 26 October 2013
Leicester Lions away to Caldy on 4 January 2014

Most drop goals in a match — 2

Birmingham & Solihull away to Luctonians on 5 October 2013

=== Player ===
Most points in a match — 35

(England) Stephen Collins for Sedgley Park at home to Dudley Kingswinford on 7 December 2013

Most tries in a match — 5 (x2)

(England) Matthew Lamprey for Sedgley Park at home to Dudley Kingswinford on 7 December 2013
(England) Nathan Bressington for Stourbridge at home to Bromsgrove on 12 April 2014

Most conversions in a match — 13

(England) Stephen Collins for Sedgley Park at home to Dudley Kingswinford on 7 December 2013

Most penalties in a match — 6 (x2)

(England) Mark Ireland for Otley away to Sedgley Park on 26 October 2013
(England) Jon Boden for Leicester Lions away to Caldy on 4 January 2014

Most drop goals in a match — 2

(England) Adam Canning for Birmingham & Solihull away to Luctonians on 5 October 2013

=== Attendances ===
Highest — 3,750

Darlington Mowden Park at home to Macclesfield on 26 April 2014

Lowest — 90

Hull at home to Otley on 14 December 2013

Highest Average Attendance — 913

Darlington Mowden Park

Lowest Average Attendance — 122

Leicester Lions

== See also ==
- English Rugby Union Leagues
- English rugby union system
- Rugby union in England
