= Elliot Bale =

English rugby union player

- Full name: Elliot Bale
- Born: 2 December 1991 (age 34) Rugby, England
- Height: 1.78 m (5 ft 10 in)
- Weight: 87 kg (13 st 10 lb)
- School: Lawrence Sheriff School, England
- University: University of Bedfordshire

Rugby union career
- Position: Fly-half
- Current team: Birmingham Moseley Rugby Club
Senior career
| Years | Team | Apps | (Points) |
| 2015–2016 | Plymouth Albion R.F.C. | | |
| 2016–present | Birmingham Moseley Rugby Club | | |

Elliot Bale (born 2 December 1991) is a British rugby union player, currently playing with English National League 1 side Birmingham Moseley Rugby Club. His position is fly-half.

== Background ==
Bale attended Lawrence Sheriff School and University of Bedfordshire.

== Rugby career ==
=== Leicester Tigers ===
Bale signed for Leicester Tigers Academy aged 16 and was part of the squad to remain unbeaten in 2010, successfully defeating England U20s in the final match.

=== Plymouth Albion ===
Bale moved to Plymouth Albion R.F.C. in National League 1 for the 2015–2016 season, having been a product of Leicester Tigers Academy.

=== Birmingham Moseley ===
Bale signed for Birmingham Moseley Rugby Club in National League 1 for the 2016–2017 season.

It was announced September 5, 2019 Bale had signed for Rugby club Châteaurenard in Provence, France.
