= Dogge (disambiguation) =

Dogge is a historical spelling for dog.

Dogge may also refer to:

- Dogge, also called "Rüde"; a type of charge in German heraldry; see hound (heraldry)
- Dogge Doggelito (born 1975), Swedish rapper

== See also ==
- Shepton v Dogge, a 1442 English contract law case
- Dogged
- Dogging (disambiguation)
- Dogger (disambiguation)
- Doggy (disambiguation)
- Dogg (disambiguation)
- Doge (disambiguation)
- Dog (disambiguation)
