= Dog (disambiguation) =

The dog is a domesticated canid species, Canis familiaris.

Dog, dogs, DOG, or DOGS may also refer to:

== Animals ==
- Species in the family Canidae called "dogs" as a part of their common name:
  - African wild dog, Lycaon pictus, of Africa
  - Bush dog, Speothos venaticus, of South America
  - Indian wild dog, also known as the Dhole, Cuon alpinus, of Asia
  - Raccoon dog, Nyctereutes procyonoides, of Asia
  - Short-eared dog, Atelocynus microtis, of South America
- Dog, a male canid, as opposed to a bitch
- Non-canid animals, e.g.:
  - Prairie dogs, Cynomys, a genus of North American social ground squirrels

== Places ==
- Dog Crossing, Georgia, an unincorporated community, US
- Dog Hollow (Illinois), a valley in Illinois, US
- Dog Island (Florida), a barrier island in the Gulf of Mexico, US
- Dog Islands, an island group in the British Virgin Islands
- Dog River (disambiguation)
- Isle of Dogs, a peninsula in East London, UK
- The Dogs, Wincanton, house in Wincanton, Somerset, England
- Dog Dome, a granite dome in the Tuolumne Meadows area of Yosemite National Park

== People ==
=== Name ===
- He Dog (1830–1930), an Oglala Sioux leader
- Mary Crow Dog (1954-2013), a Dakota Sioux author and activist also known as Mary Brave Bird

=== Nickname ===
- Diogenes of Sinope (c. 413/403–c. 324/321 BC), ancient Greek philosopher
- Michael Artiaga (born 2007), American Tetris player
- Clive Barker (soccer) (1944–2023), South African football coach
- Duane Chapman (born 1953) better known as Dog the Bounty Hunter, American television personality, bounty hunter, and former bail bondsman
- Alexandr Dolgopolov (born 1988), Ukrainian tennis player
- Al Jourgensen (born 1958), Cuban-American musician
- James H. Kelley (1834–1912), English-born mayor of Dodge City, Kansas
- DMX (rapper)

== Arts and media ==
=== Fictional characters ===
- Augie Doggie and Doggie Daddy, television cartoon characters
- The main character in the comic strip Footrot Flats
- A minor character in the television show Red Dwarf
- Dog (Half-Life 2), from the video game Half-Life 2
- Dog, in the Nickelodeon TV series CatDog
- Dog, in the 1998 film Lock, Stock and Two Smoking Barrels
- Dog, Daryl Dixon's pet dog introduced in The Walking Dead season 9, episode 7: "Stradivarius"
- Dog, from the Emmy Award-winning children's animation show WordWorld

=== Books ===
- Dogs (manga), by Shirow Miwa, subtitled "Bullets & Carnage"
- The Dogs, novel by Ivan Nazhivin 1931

=== Film ===
- Dogs (1977 film), a natural horror film
- The Dogs (1979 film), a French film
- Dog (2001 film), an animated short film by Suzie Templeton
- The Dog (film), a 2013 documentary about the real story behind Dog Day Afternoon
- Dogs (2016 film), a Romanian film
- Dog (2022 film), an American film starring Channing Tatum
- Dogs (2025 film), an Uruguayan-Argentine film directed by Gerardo Minutti

=== Television ===
- Dog, an ident for BBC Two, first aired in 1993 (see BBC Two 1991–2001 idents)
- "The Dog" (Seinfeld), a 1991 episode
- Dogs (TV series), a 2018 Netflix documentary series
- "Dog" (Miranda), a 2009 episode
- "Dogs", a Series D episode of QI (2006)
- "Dogs" (The Bear), a 2022 episode

=== Music ===
==== Performers ====
- Dogs (British band), a British punk music band
- Dogs (French band), a French rock music band
- The Dogs (US punk band), a Michigan proto-punk band
- The Dogs (US hip-hop band), an American hiphop band
- The Dogs, the Finnish band Ile Kallio
- DMX (rapper), nicknamed "Dog"

==== Albums ====
- Dogs (Beware of Safety album), 2009
- Dogs (Nina Nastasia album), 2000
- Dogs, 2011, by The Parlor Mob

==== Songs ====
- "Dogs" (Damien Rice song), 2007
- "Dogs" (Pink Floyd song), 1977
- "Dogs" (The Who song), 1968
- "Dogs", by IShowSpeed and Kai Cenat, 2023
- "Dogs", by British heavy metal band Motörhead from Rock 'n' Roll (1987)
- "Dogs", by Sun Kil Moon from Benji (2014)
- "Dog", by Sly and the Family Stone from their 1967 debut A Whole New Thing
- "The Dog", by Rufus Thomas
- "Dog", by C418 from Minecraft – Volume Alpha

==== Other uses in music ====
- Dog, a fad dance

=== Other media ===
- The Dog (franchise), created by Artlist in Japan in 2000
- The Dog (Goya), a painting by Francisco Goya
- Disk Original Group, a Famicom Disk System game development collective
- Dulwich Outdoor Gallery

== Food and beverages ==
- Newcastle Brown Ale, an English brand of dark brown beer, nicknamed "Dog"
- Corn dog (also spelled corndog), a sausage or hot dog on a stick that has been coated in a thick layer of cornmeal batter and deep fried
- Hot dog, a cooked sausage served in a bun

== Organizations ==
- Dog soldiers, or Dog Men (Cheyenne: Hotamétaneo'o), one of six Cheyenne military societies
- Deployable Operations Group, U.S. Coast Guard command
- Deutsche Orient-Gesellschaft, the German Oriental Society
- Dulwich Outdoor Gallery
- Bulldogs Rugby League Football Club, an Australian football club, nicknamed "The Dogs" or "The Doggies"

== Science, technology, and mathematics ==
=== Tools and hardware ===
- Bench dog, a removable clamp inserted into a workbench to hold an item fast
- Dog, a form of pawl used to secure a chain, as on an anchor windlass
- Dog clutch, a clutch that couples two rotating shafts or components by interference or clearance fit
- Dog (engineering), a tool or part of a tool, such as a pawl, that prevents or imparts movement through physical engagement
- "Dog irons" or "fire dogs", a form of andiron for holding wood in a fireplace, or skewers in place for cooking over a fire
- Feed dogs, movable plates which pull fabric through a sewing machine in discrete steps between stitches
- Lathe dog, a dog which clamps on a work piece to allow it to be revolved by a lathe face-plate

=== Other uses in science, technology, and mathematics ===
- Dog (zodiac), the Chinese zodiac sign
- Hurricane Dog (disambiguation), three tropical cyclones in 1950, 1951 and 1952
- Sirius, the Dog Star, brightest star in Canis Major, the big dog constellation
- Sun dog, an atmospheric phenomenon that consists of a bright spot to the left and right of the Sun
- Difference of Gaussians, in mathematics
- Digital on-screen graphic

== Sports ==
- Greyhound racing
- Bulldogs Rugby League Football Club, an Australian football club, nicknamed "The Dogs" or "The Doggies"
- Underdogs, also called "dogs" in sports betting

== Other uses ==
- Dog (zodiac), the Chinese zodiac sign
- Dog, a non-standard hand in the card game poker
- Dog, in some British spelling alphabets, the letter "D"
- Dog in business, a stock-keeping unit in a growth–share matrix with low market share and poor prospects
- DogFart, an American adult website
- Dog Latin, English made to resemble Latin

== See also ==
- Dawg (disambiguation), includes Dawgs
- Dogg (disambiguation)
- Dogge (disambiguation)
- Dogz, a game in the Petz series of games
- The Dog (disambiguation), includes The Dogs
- Doggy style (disambiguation)
- Dogging (disambiguation)
