= Dogger =

Dogger may refer to:

== Places ==
- Dogger Bank, a large shallow area in the North Sea between Britain and Denmark
  - Dogger, a sea area in the North Sea, noted in shipping forecasts within the Dogger Bank

== People ==
=== Individuals ===
- Paul Dogger (1971), a former professional tennis player from the Netherlands

=== By activities ===
- Dogger, a person who engages in the sexual practice of dogging
- Dogger, a person who hunted and trapped dingoes

== Other uses ==
- The Dogger, rocks of the Middle Jurassic epoch
- Dogger (boat), a type of ketch rigged fishing boat working the Dogger Bank in the seventeenth century
- Dogger (book), a book by Shirley Hughes

== See also ==
- Battle of Dogger Bank (disambiguation)
- Dog (disambiguation)
- Dogging (disambiguation)
- Doggo, an internet slang term for "dogs' language"
- On the Dogger Bank, an 1846 painting by the British artist Clarkson Stanfield
