= Dog Hollow =

Dog Hollow may refer to:

- Dog Hollow (Illinois), a valley in Pope County
- Dog Hollow (McDonald County, Missouri), a valley
- Dog Hollow (West Virginia), a valley
- Dog Hollow, Omaha a neighborhood of Omaha, Nebraska
