= The Dog =

The Dog or The Dogs may refer to:

== Film and television ==
- The Dogs (film), a 1979 French film
- The Dog (film), a 2013 documentary about Dog Day Afternoon
- "The Dog" (Fear the Walking Dead), a 2015 television episode
- "The Dog" (King Rollo), a 1980 television episode
- "The Dog" (Seinfeld), a 1991 television episode
- The Dog, a character in Death Toll
- The Dog, a minor character in Red Dwarf

== Music ==
- Dogs (French band), a French punk and new wave band
- Dogs (British band), an English indie rock group
- The Dogs (American punk band), a proto-punk group
- The Dogs (American hip-hop group), a hip-hop band
- The Dogs, a Finnish band featuring Ile Kallio
- "The Dog", a song by English punk band The Damned on their 1982 album Strawberries
- "The Dog", a song by singer Rufus Thomas

== Other uses ==
- The Dog (Goya), a painting by Francisco Goya
- The Dogs, Wincanton, a house in Wincanton, Somerset, England
- Dog Islands, an island group in the British Virgin Islands
- The Dog, an 1845 non-fiction work by William Youatt
- The Dogs, a 1976 novel by Robert Calder
- The Dogs, a 2015 novel by Allan Stratton
- The Dog (franchise), a Japanese franchise created in 2000
  - The Dog: Happy Life, a 2006 pet simulator video game
  - The Dog Island, a 2007 adventure video game
- Bulldogs Rugby League Football Club or The Dogs, an Australian football club
- The Dog, a character in Footrot Flats

== See also ==
- That Dog, a rock band
- The Dogs D'Amour, an English rock band
- Dog (disambiguation)
