= Doggy (disambiguation) =

Doggy is a name for a dog in baby talk, but can also be related to a member of the canine family.

Doggy, Doggie, or doggies may also refer to:

== People and characters ==
- Gordon "Doggie" Kuhn (1905–1978), Canadian ice hockey player
- Doggie Julian (1901–1967), U.S. player and coach in basketball, baseball, American football
- Doggie Miller (1864–1909), U.S. baseball player
- Doggie Trenchard (1874–1943), U.S. American football player
- Doggie Wise, a member of the 1924 Hawaii Deans football team

=== Fictional characters ===
- Chief Anubis "Doggie" Cruger (character), a fictional character from Power Ranger S.P.D.

== Groups, companies, organizations ==
- Western Bulldogs, nicknamed "The Doggies"; an AFL team in West Footscray, Victoria, Australia
- Sydney Ice Dogs, nicknamed "Doggies", an ice hockey team in Sydney, New South Wales, Australia
- Doggie Diner, California, USA; a fastfood restaurant chain

== Music ==
- "Doggies" (멍멍이), a 2010 single by Norazo
- "Doggie" (song), a 1998 song by Shizuka Kudo off the album I'm Not
- "Doggie" (Anslem Douglas song), a song by Anslem Douglas

== Other uses ==
- Detection of Olfactory traces by orthoGonal Gas Identification technologiES (DOGGIES); see Gasera
- Doggy style, a sex position

== See also ==
- Dog (disambiguation)
- Doge (disambiguation)
- Dogg (disambiguation)
- Doggy style (disambiguation)
