= Dawg =

Dawg or DAWG may refer to:

== People ==
- Phife Dawg or simply Phife (1970–2016), American rapper and member of the group A Tribe Called Quest
- Smoke Dawg (1996–2018), Canadian rapper
- White Dawg, American rapper and record producer

== Arts and entertainment ==
- Dawg (film), a romantic-comedy film (also known as Bad Boy) starring Liz Hurley and Denis Leary
- Dawg '90, an all-instrumental album by American musician David Grisman, recorded with his group David Grisman Quintet in 1990
- Dawg, the nickname of American mandolinist David Grisman

== Fictional characters ==
- Dawg, a fictional dog from the DC Comics series, Lobo
- Dawg, a companion of The Dandy comics Desperate Dan

== Sports ==
- Okotoks Dawgs, collegiate baseball team
- Informal nickname used by University of Georgia Bulldog athletics
- Informal nickname used by University of Washington Husky athletics
- Informal nickname used by Louisiana Tech University Bulldog athletics

== Abbreviation ==
- Directed acyclic word graph (disambiguation)
- Deputy's Advisory Working Group, a governance body within the United States Department of Defense
- Dynamically Allocated Way Guard, a mitigation approach to the Spectre security vulnerability
- Alternative spelling of dog
- Defense Autonomous Warfare Group, the evolution of the Replicator program in the United states.

== See also ==
- Dog (disambiguation)
- Dogg (disambiguation)
