= Doge =

Doge, doge, or DOGE may refer to:

== Government ==
- Doge (title), an elected leader in several Italian city-states:
  - Doge of Amalfi (839–1673)
  - Doge of Genoa (1339–1797)
  - Doge of Venice (697–1797)
- Department of Government Efficiency, a 2025 United States federal initiative

== Other uses ==
- Doge (meme), an Internet meme primarily associated with the Shiba Inu dog breed
- Dogecoin (trading code: DOGE), a cryptocurrency named after the meme
- DOGE (database) (French: Documentation en Gestion des Entreprises), an academic bibliographic database
- Caffè del Doge, Italian café franchise
- Döge, a village in Hungary
- Elphias Doge, a character from the Harry Potter series

== See also ==
- DOGE-1, planned cubesat mission
- Dodge (disambiguation)
- Doeg (disambiguation)
- Dog (disambiguation)
