= Public sex =

Sexual activity that takes place in a public context

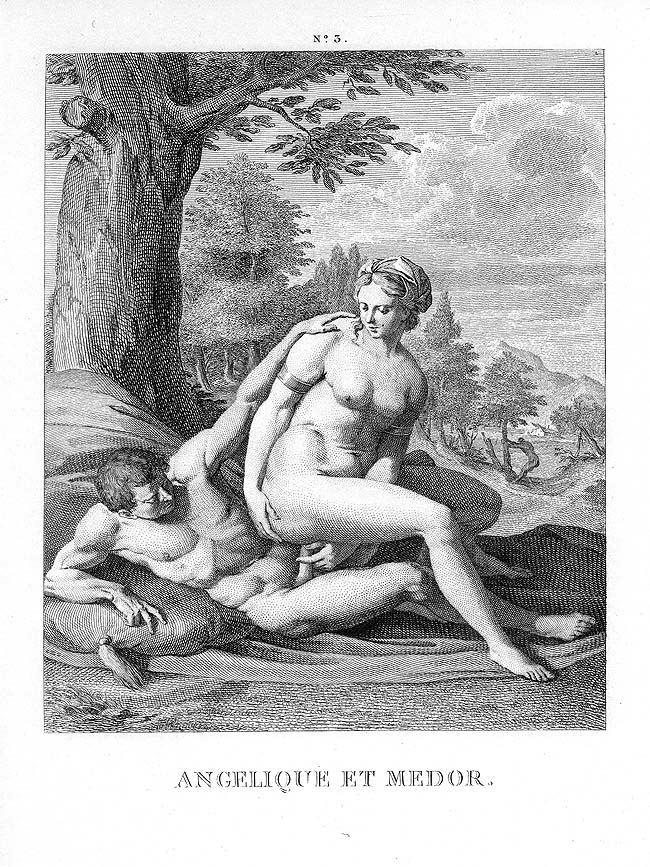
Engraving by Jacques Joseph Coiny, Angelique et Medor. 1798

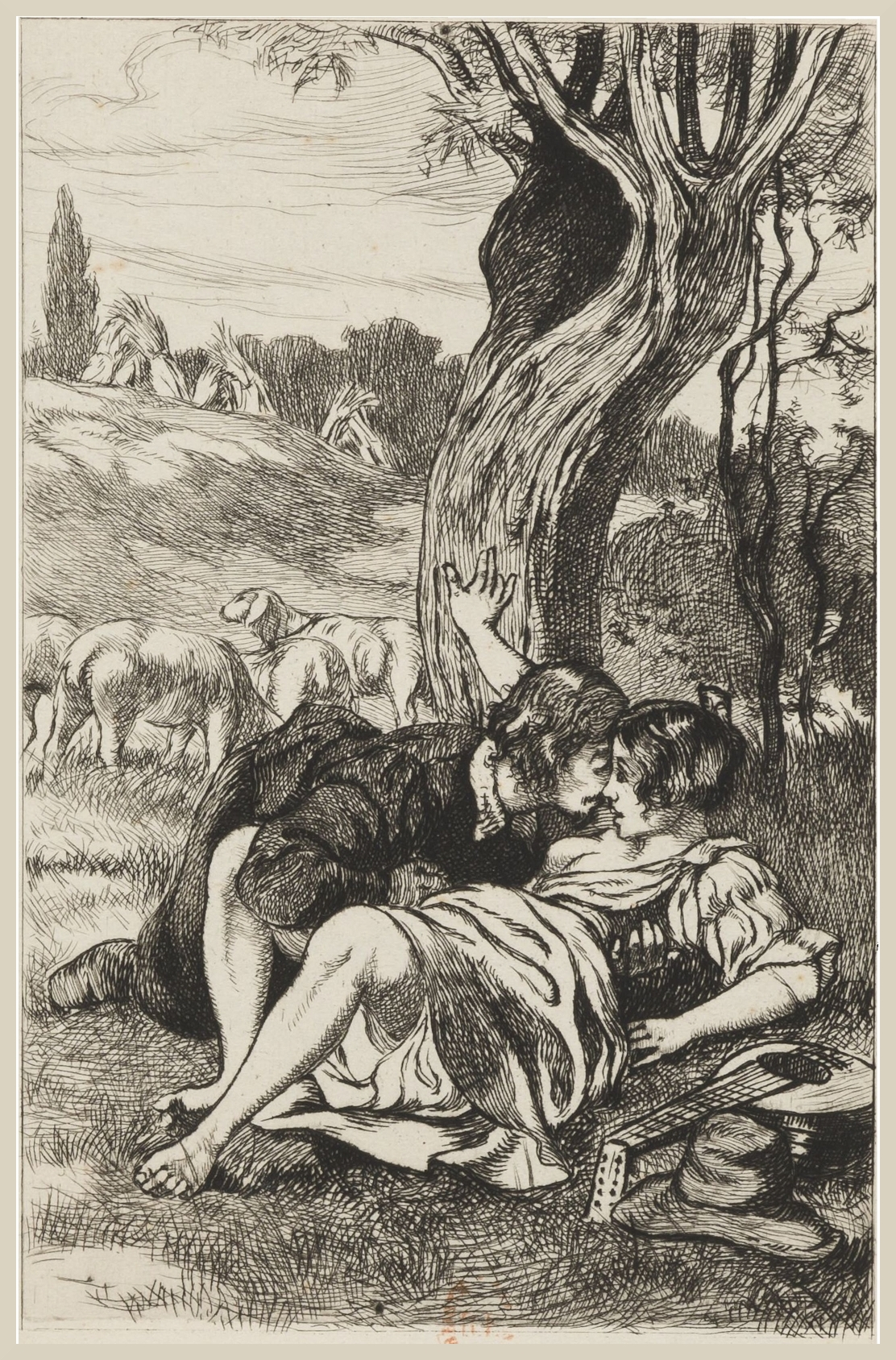
Martin van Maële's print Francion 15 (published 1925) depicts a couple engaging in foreplay outdoors.

Public sex is sexual activity that takes place in a public context. It refers to one or more persons performing a sex act in a public place, or in a private place that can be viewed from a public place.

Such a private place may be a back yard, a barn, balcony or a bedroom with the curtains open. Public sex also includes sexual acts in semi-public places where the general public is free to enter, such as shopping malls. Public sex acts can be performed in a car (colloquially called "parking"), on a beach, in a forest, theatre, bus, aeroplane, street, cubicle, elevator, bathroom, cemetery, and other locations.

According to a large study in 2008, having sex in a public place is a common fantasy and a significant number of couples or individuals have done so. The fantasy is at times depicted in art or film.

== Incidence ==
In ancient Greece, it was recorded that Crates of Thebes, the Cynic philosopher, had sexual intercourse with his wife Hipparchia of Maroneia, another Cynic philosopher, in public. In England, some of the 17th century religious dissenters known as Ranters engaged in public sex.

In September 2003, the BBC reported on a "dogging" craze fueled by Internet publicity. Dogging is a British English slang term for engaging in public sex, usually in a car park or country park, while others watch. Dogging has aspects of exhibitionism and voyeurism.

There is some evidence on the Internet that during the next decade "dogging" spread to other countries, such as the United States, Canada, Ireland, Australia, Barbados, Brazil, the Netherlands, Denmark, Norway, Poland, and Sweden.

Outdoor public sex purportedly takes place often in parks and beaches in Vancouver and San Francisco. According to the New York magazine, public sex occurs frequently in New York City, and is a fantasy common to many people.

== Perception ==
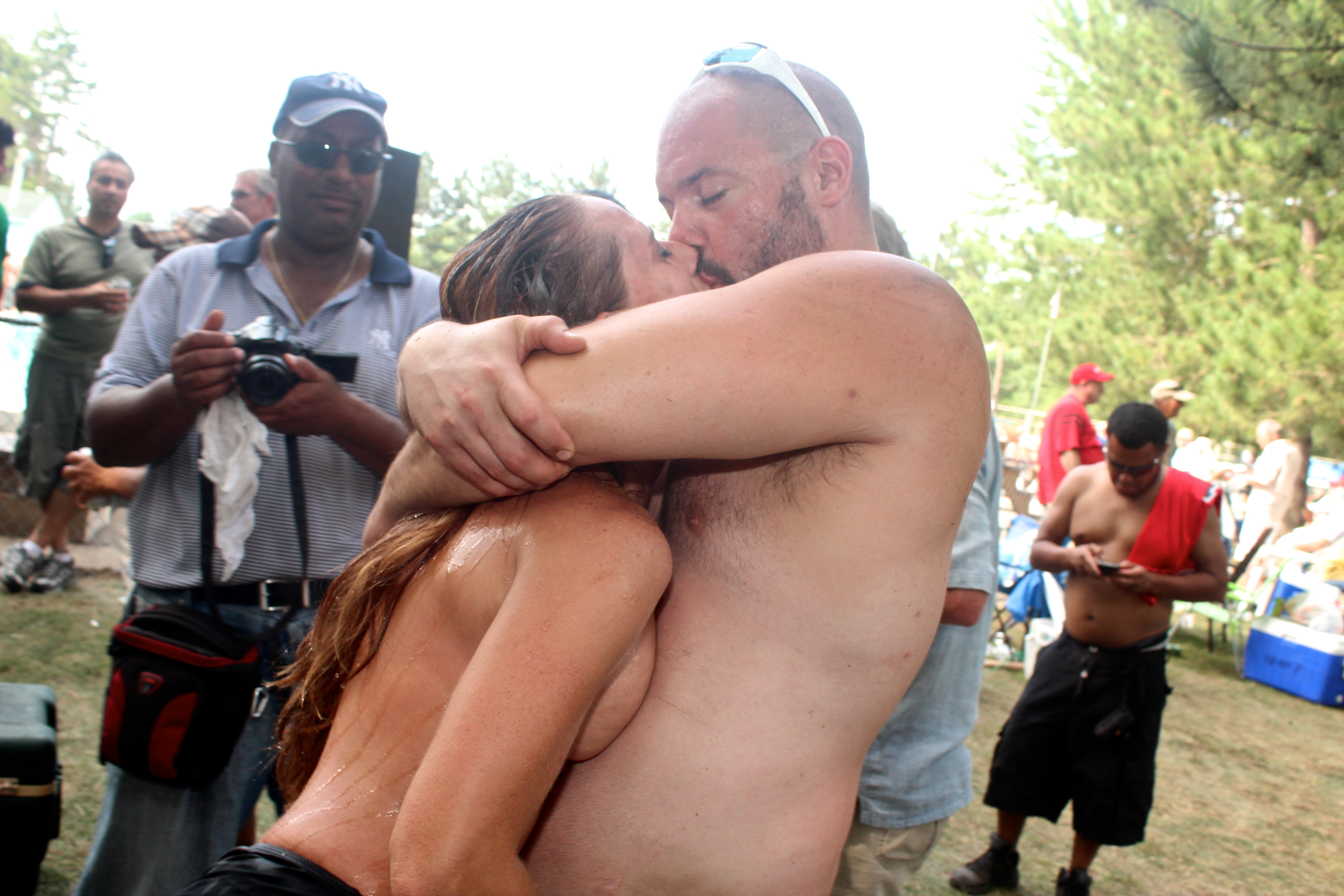
A topless couple kissing in public, Nudes-A-Poppin', USA, 2013

Social views related to public sex and sexuality vary greatly between cultures and different times. There are many and varied laws that apply to sex in public, which use a variety of terms such as indecent exposure, public lewdness, gross indecency, and others. In some jurisdictions, an offense is committed only if the participants are seen by others, so that a sex act may occur in a closed toilet cubicle without an offense being committed.

In the United Kingdom, there has been a rise in public sex venues, possibly due to a more relaxed approach to the enforcement of laws relating to public sex since the early 1990s.

== Legality ==
In the United Kingdom, the legal status of public sexual acts was considered as part of the Sexual Offences Act 2003. Section 71 of the Act makes it an offence to engage in sexual activity in a public lavatory. In the United Kingdom public sex comes under laws related to voyeurism, exhibitionism or public displays of sexual behaviour, but public sex law enforcement remains ambiguous. Prosecution is possible for a number of offences under section 5 of the Public Order Act 1986, exposure under section 66 of the Sexual Offences Act 2003, or under the common law offence of outraging public decency. The policy of the Association of Chief Police Officers (ACPO) is that arrests are a last resort and a more gradual approach should be taken in such circumstances.

== See also ==
- Cottaging
- Exhibitionism
- Girls Gone Wild (franchise)
- Nudity and sexuality
- Public display of affection
- Public nudity
- Public Sex (film)
- Sexualization
