= List of storms named Dog =

The name Dog has been used for three tropical cyclones in the Atlantic Ocean:

- Hurricane Dog (1950) – a Category 4 hurricane
- Hurricane Dog (1951) – a Category 1 hurricane that passed through the Central Windward Islands
- Tropical Storm Dog (1952) – a strong tropical storm that never threatened land
