= Doeg =

Doeg can refer to:

- Doeg the Edomite, a herdsman in the time of King David
- Doeg people, a Native American people in Northern Virginia in the 17th century, known for their role in Bacon's rebellion

== See also ==
- Doge (disambiguation)
