= Dogging =

Dogging may refer to:

- Dogging (sexual slang), a British English slang term for engaging in public sex while others watch
- Dogging: A Love Story, the original title of Public Sex (film), a 2009 British romantic comedy
- Dogging, a slang term for truancy used in parts of Britain
- Dogging, a method of catching wildfowl using a duck decoy (structure)

== See also ==
- Dog (disambiguation)
