= Hurricane Fox =

Category 4 Atlantic hurricane in 1952

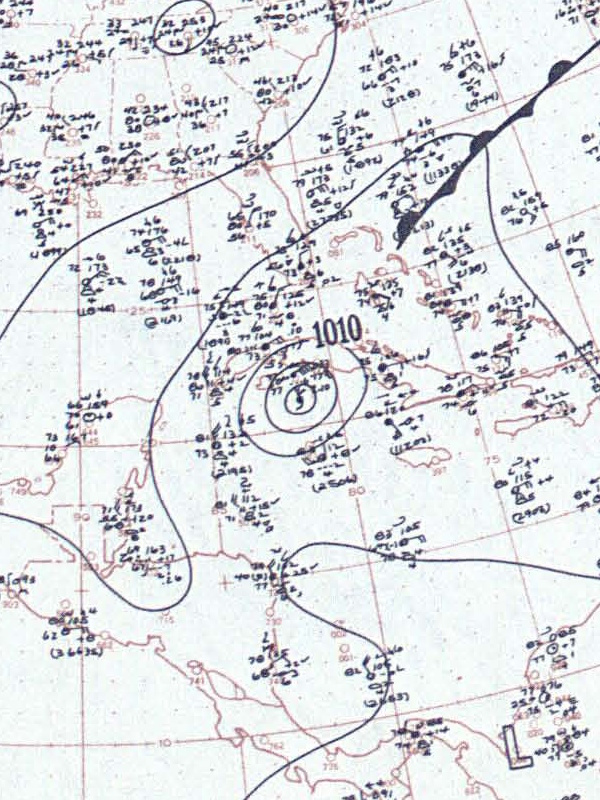
- Surface weather analysis map showing Fox on October 24

Meteorological history
- Formed: October 20, 1952
- Dissipated: October 28, 1952

Category 4 major hurricane
- 1-minute sustained (SSHWS/NWS)
- Highest winds: 145 mph (230 km/h)
- Lowest pressure: 934 mbar (hPa); 27.58 inHg

Overall effects
- Fatalities: 601
- Damage: $10 million (1952 USD)
- Areas affected: Cayman Islands, Cuba, southeast Florida, the Bahamas
- IBTrACS
- Part of the 1952 Atlantic hurricane season

Hurricane Fox was a powerful, destructive, and deadly tropical cyclone that crossed central Cuba in October 1952. The seventh named storm, sixth hurricane, and third major hurricane of the 1952 Atlantic hurricane season, it was the strongest and deadliest system of the season. Fox developed northwest of Cartagena, Colombia, in the southern Caribbean Sea. It moved steadily northwest, intensifying to a tropical storm on October 21. The next day, it rapidly strengthened into a hurricane and turned north passing closely to Grand Cayman, Cayman Islands. The cyclone attained peak winds of 145 mph (233 km/h) as it struck Cayo Guano del Este off the coast of Cienfuegos. Fox made landfall on Cuba at maximum intensity on October 24, producing peak gusts of 170–180 mph (270–290 km/h). It weakened over land, but it re-strengthened as it turned east over the Bahamas. On October 26, it weakened and took an erratic path, dissipating west-southwest of Bermuda on October 28.

Fox was the second most intense hurricane to strike Cuba until Hurricane Michelle in 2001. It was originally believed to have been the second Category 4 hurricane in Cuba prior to the Atlantic hurricane reanalysis. At the time, the cyclone produced the fourth lowest pressure in a landfalling Cuban hurricane; only the 1917, 1924, and 1932 hurricanes were more intense. Hurricane Irma would later join that list in 2017. Hurricane Fox killed 600 people across the island, causing severe crop damages in rural areas. The hurricane also ruined 30 percent of the tomato crops on Eleuthera in the Bahamas. Across the archipelago, Fox produced wind gusts in excess of 110 mph (180 km/h). Total damages reached $10 million in Cuba. Fox was the second hurricane to land during the season, after Hurricane Able struck South Carolina.

== Meteorological history ==
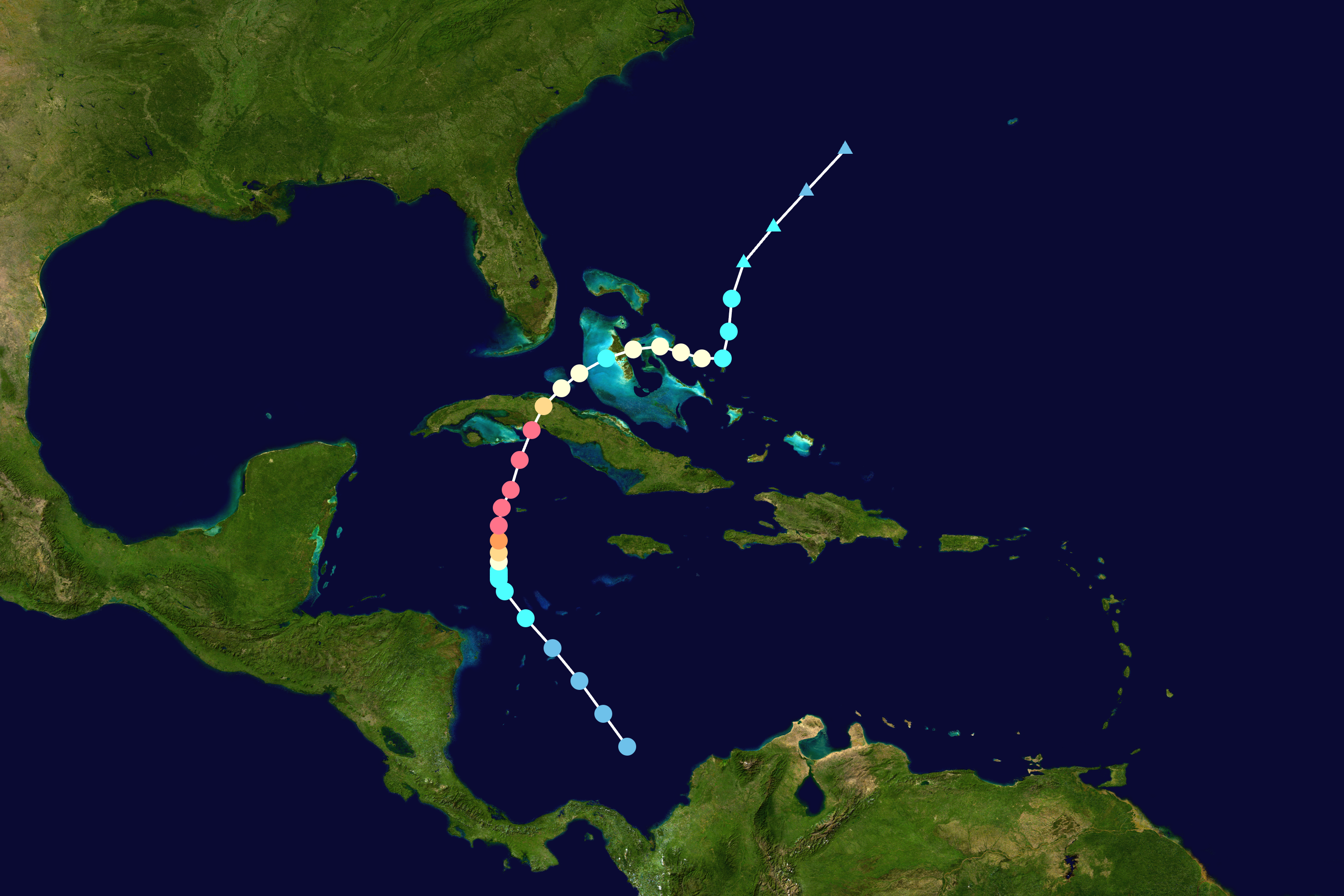
Map plotting the storm's track and intensity, according to the Saffir–Simpson scale Map key Saffir–Simpson scale Tropical depression (≤38 mph, ≤62 km/h) Tropical storm (39–73 mph, 63–118 km/h) Category 1 (74–95 mph, 119–153 km/h) Category 2 (96–110 mph, 154–177 km/h) Category 3 (111–129 mph, 178–208 km/h) Category 4 (130–156 mph, 209–251 km/h) Category 5 (≥157 mph, ≥252 km/h) Unknown Storm type Tropical cyclone Subtropical cyclone Extratropical cyclone, remnant low, tropical disturbance, or monsoon depression

On October 20, a tropical depression formed in the Caribbean Sea, 170 miles (270 km) northwest of Cartagena, Colombia. Fox is believed to have developed from a low-pressure area in the Intertropical Convergence Zone, though it was not operationally detected until October 21. The system steadily advanced northwest and it gradually intensified. On October 21, a reconnaissance mission flew into the system, reporting sustained winds of 35 mph (56 km/h) and gusts to 55 mph (89 km/h). At the time, the system is estimated to have strengthened to Tropical Storm Fox. The cyclone continued to deepen, and it reached the equivalent of a Category 1 hurricane on the Saffir–Simpson scale, 120 miles (190 km) southeast of the Swan Islands, Honduras. The hurricane rapidly intensified and turned north on October 23, strengthening to attain winds which correspond to a modern-day major hurricane, a storm of Category 3 status or higher on the Saffir–Simpson scale. The Hurricane passed closely to Grand Cayman, Cayman Islands. Late on October 24, the cyclone struck the small island of Cayo Guano del Estes in the Archipelago de los Canarreos, south of Cienfuegos. Maximum sustained winds were near 145 mph (233 km/h), and the island's weather station recorded a minimum pressure of 934 mbar (27.6 inHg). The cyclone crossed the mainland coast of Cuba west of Cienfuegos, and it weakened as it crossed the island.

Early on October 25, Hurricane Fox entered the Atlantic Ocean. It crossed central Andros and turned east across the Bahamas. On October 26, the hurricane briefly re-intensified as it crossed Cat Island. The center became ill-defined, and the cyclone quickly weakened. It turned north and then took an erratic northeast turn as it weakened to a tropical storm on October 27. The system gained extratropical characteristics as it merged with a polar frontal boundary, and it dissipated west-southwest of Bermuda on October 28.

== Preparations ==
Advisories, along with coordination between the National Observatory at Havana and U.S. Weather Bureau, were credited for the reduced deaths in Cuba. Weather observations were also readily available from Cuban meteorological stations. On October 25, the cyclone's hurricane-force winds were expected to remain off the Florida east coast, although gale-force winds were anticipated from the Florida Keys to Palm Beach, Florida. Accordingly, storm warnings were issued from Key West, Florida to Vero Beach, Florida. Military aircraft were transported to safer locations, while watercraft were stored in harbors and rivers. Hotels and resorts were boarded up on the barrier islands. The Bahamas received warnings well in advance of the hurricane. The hurricane turned quickly to the east, which reduced the threat to Bimini, Cat Cay, Grand Bahama, and the Abaco Islands.

== Impact ==
Wettest tropical cyclones and their remnants in Haiti Highest-known totals
Precipitation			Storm	Location	Ref.
Rank	mm	in	Storm	Location	Ref.
1	1,447.8	57.00	Flora 1963	Miragoâne	
2	654.8	25.78	Noel 2007	Camp Perrin	
3	604.5	23.80	Matthew 2016	Anse-á-Veau	
4	410.0	16.14	Lili 2002	Camp Perrin	
5	323.0	12.72	Hanna 2008	Camp Perrin	
6	273.0	10.75	Gustav 2008	Camp Perrin	
7	168.0	6.614	Laura 2020	Port-Au-Prince	
8	65.0	2.56	Fox 1952	Ouanaminthe	

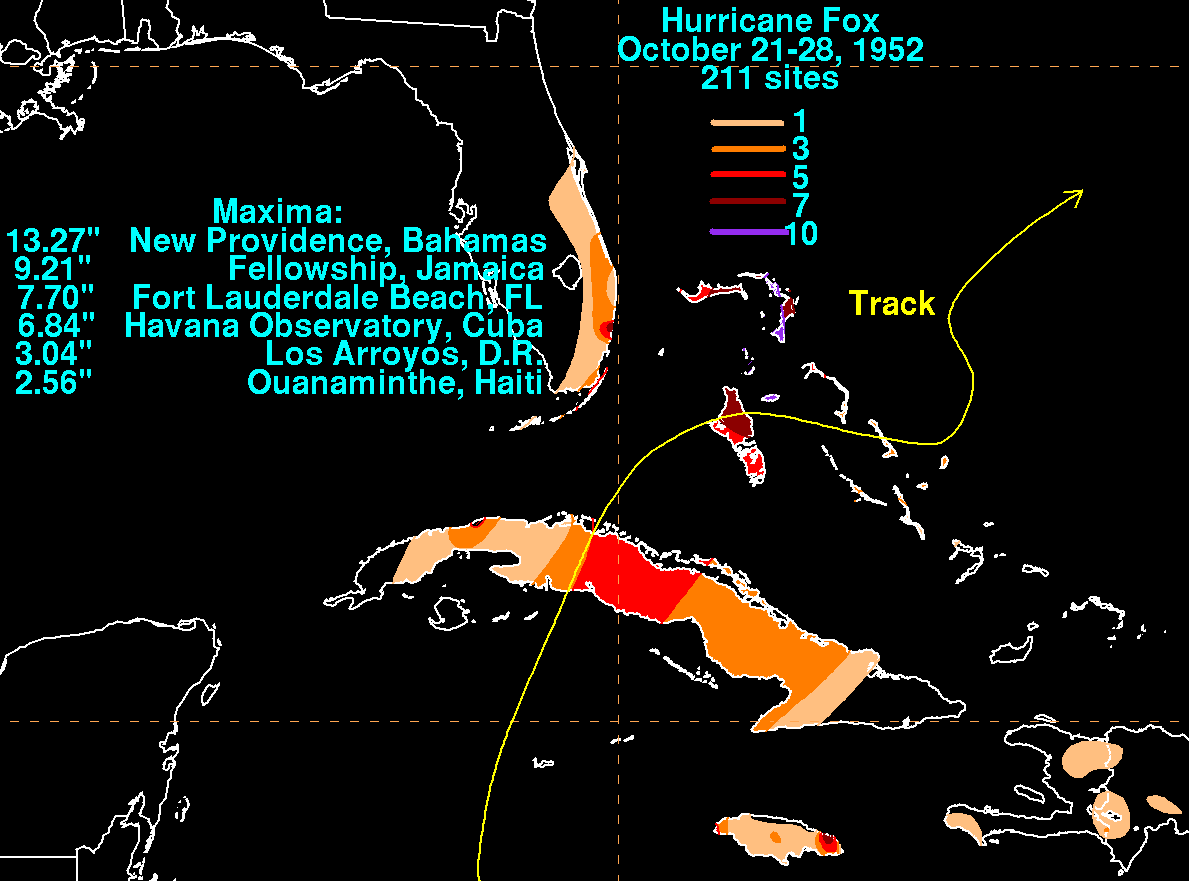
Storm total rainfall related to Hurricane Fox

An aircraft flight into the storm experienced severe turbulence, and wind driven rain reportedly stripped paint from the plane's surfaces.

As a result of the storm, 70 people were injured in Cuba. Severe damage to properties and crops occurred in rural areas. In Zulueta, 30 structures were destroyed, while a Japanese freighter was washed ashore on the reefs near Cayo Breton. The crew survived, though another ship was disabled during the storm. The fringes of the storm produced heavy rainfall in Cuba, flooding low areas and causing several rivers to overflow their banks. Strong winds uprooted large trees in Santa Isabel, and winds of 100 mph (160 km/h) were reported in the city of Cienfuegos. In Aguada de Pasajeros, 600 buildings were demolished, while 36 of 261 sugar mills across the island were damaged by Hurricane Fox. In all, Hurricane Fox killed 600 people in Cuba and caused $10 million in damages.

The cyclone produced peak winds of 50 mph (80 km/h) in Nassau, Bahamas, causing no reported damage. Crops were damaged by high winds and heavy precipitation on Eleuthera. About 30 percent of the tomato crops were destroyed during the storm. A man who attempted to secretly seed and weaken the storm was missing and presumed dead after his plane disappeared off Miami, Florida. Multiple searches by the Coast Guard were unsuccessful.

In the early 1950s, Atlantic tropical cyclones were named via the Joint Army/Navy Phonetic Alphabet. Hurricane Fox of 1952 was the final Atlantic tropical cyclone to be designated with this naming system, and a female list of tropical cyclone names was utilized in the 1953 Atlantic hurricane season. After the stronger 1917 Pinar del Río hurricane, Hurricane Fox was Cuba's second most intense landfall until Hurricane Michelle struck the island in 2001. Originally, the 1917 hurricane was believed to have been a Category 3 hurricane prior to the Atlantic hurricane reanalysis, which made Fox the second Category 4 landfall after the 1932 Cuba Hurricane. At the time, Fox was the fourth most intense hurricane to strike Cuba in terms of atmospheric pressure; only the 1917, 1924, and 1932 storms were stronger at one point in their life spans.

== See also ==
- List of Category 4 Atlantic hurricanes
- List of Florida hurricanes
- Hurricane Michelle
- Hurricane Paloma
