= Dog Hollow (McDonald County, Missouri) =

Valley in Missouri, United States

- Location within Missouri

Geography
- Coordinates: 36°35′28″N 94°22′45″W
- Interactive map of Dog Hollow

Dog Hollow is a valley in the U.S. state of Missouri. Numerous hunting dogs in the valley caused the name Dog Hollow to be selected.
