= Shepton v Dogge =

1442 English contract law case

- Citations: (1442) B&M 390

Keywords
- Contract, remedies

Shepton v Dogge (1442) B&M 390 is an old English contract law case, concerning the action for debt, and exemplifying the manner in which litigants had to make claims in deceit, or other forms of action that were recognised by the primitive legal system.

== Facts ==
The defendant agreed, in London, to sell and convey land outside London to the plaintiff. She took the money, but then conveyed the land to a third party. The plaintiff sued in deceit. Had the land been inside the city, the action could have been brought in city courts by London's custom. This would have meant actions in covenant did not require documents under a seal. The normal remedy would be specific performance. Moreover, if one had put it out of their power to perform, they would be imprisoned until they could repay.

== Judgment ==
Held, damages were awarded.

== See also ==
- English contract law
