= Doggy style (disambiguation) =

Doggy style is any sex position in which a person bends over, crouches on all fours, or lies on their stomach, for sexual activity.

Doggy style or doggystyle may also refer to:

== Music ==
=== Snoop Dogg ===
- Doggy Style Records, an American record label founded by Snoop Dogg in 1995
- Doggystyle, the 1993 debut studio album from American rapper Snoop Dogg
- Snoop Dogg's Doggystyle, a mixed hardcore pornography and hip-hop music video featuring the music of rapper Snoop Dogg

=== Other music ===
- Doggy Style (band), a punk rock band from Placentia, California
- "Doggy Style", a song by Psychopomps from their 1993 album Pro-Death Ravers
- "Doggy Style", a song by Swiss band Krokus from their 1995 album To Rock or Not to Be
- "Doggy Style" (Cupcakke song), a song by American rapper Cupcakke from her 2016 mixtape S.T.D (Shelters to Deltas)

== Other uses ==
- Doggystyle (TV series), a 2018–2022 Danish TV series starring Josephine Park

== See also ==
- Dogging (sexual slang)
