= Directed acyclic word graph =

Directed acyclic word graph (DAWG) may refer to two related, but distinct, automata constructions in computer science:

- Deterministic acyclic finite state automaton, a data structure that represents a finite set of strings
- Suffix automaton, a finite automaton that functions as a suffix index
