= Battle of Dogger Bank =

Battle of Dogger Bank may refer:

- Battle of Dogger Bank (1696), during the War of the Grand Alliance between a French squadron and a Dutch convoy
- Battle of Dogger Bank (1781), during the Fourth Anglo-Dutch War between a British squadron and a Dutch squadron
- Dogger Bank incident, a 1904 incident during the Russo-Japanese War, when Russian sailors wrongly opened fire on British fishing boats
- Battle of Dogger Bank (1915), during World War I, between battlecruisers of the Royal Navy and the German Navy
- Battle of Dogger Bank (1916), during World War I, between a mine-sweeping squadron of the Royal Navy and German torpedo boats
