= Caffè del Doge =

Italian coffee roaster and café franchise

Caffè del Doge is a coffee roaster and café franchise, based in Venice, Italy.

== History ==
Caffè del Doge was founded the early 1950s by Ermenegildo Rizzardini. The first roasting facility was located near the Rialto Bridge. Since 1995, it has been operated by partners Bernardo Della Mea Francesco and Palombarini. In 1997, Caffè del Doge became a member of the Specialty Coffee Association of America and began exporting its beans to foreign markets in 1999.
