= Dog Hollow (West Virginia) =

Valley in West Virginia, United States

Coordinates: 38°39′07″N 81°38′57″W

Dog Hollow is a valley in the U.S. state of West Virginia.

The fox hounds of a local settler caused the name Dog Hollow to be selected.
