= Public Sex (film) =

- Directed by: Simon Ellis
- Produced by: Brock Norman Brock; Michael Groom
- Starring: Luke Treadaway; Kate Heppell; Richard Riddell
- Production company: Vertigo Films
- Release dates: 26 January 2009 (International Film Festival Rotterdam); 26 December 2009 (United Kingdom)
- Running time: 108 minutes
- Country: United Kingdom
- Language: English

Public Sex (Original title: Dogging: A Love Story) is a British romantic comedy film released in 2009 starring Luke Treadaway, Kate Heppell, Justine Glenton and Richard Riddell, directed by Simon Ellis and written by Michael Groom and Brock Norman Brock. The film was originally titled Dogging: A Love Story, and was changed to Public Sex when released in the United States.

== Premise ==
Dan (Luke Treadaway) is an aspiring journalist who drops his inhibitions to research the United Kingdom's underground subculture of dogging or public sex and along the way finds love and friendship.

== Cast ==
- Luke Treadaway as Dan
- Kate Heppell as Laura
- Richard Riddell as Rob
- Sammy T. Dobson as Tanya
- Michael Socha as Jim
- Justine Francesca Glenton as Sarah (as Justine Glenton)
- Allen Mechen as Laura's Dad
- Malcolm Freeman as Mister Dole
- Sean Francis as Winston
- Shaun Mechen as Interested Piker
- Dirk Smith as Council Dogger
- Ken Mood as Council Dogger (as Kenneth Mood)
- Danny Moonshine as Council Dogger
- Mike Rivers as Robb's Boss
