= Dogg =

Dogg or The Dogg is a stage name or ring name which may refer to:

- The Dogg (born 1983), Namibian musician
- Tha Dogg Pound, American hip hop group
- Nate Dogg (1969–2011), American rapper and R&B artist
- Red Dogg, a member of the hip hop group C-Block
- Road Dogg, American professional wrestler
- Snoop Dogg (born 1971), American rapper
- Swamp Dogg (born 1942), American soul artist
- Deso Dogg (1975–2018), German rapper and ISIL Member
- Tymon Dogg (born 1950), British musician

== See also ==
- Dawg (disambiguation)
- Dog (disambiguation)
- Dogge (disambiguation)
