= Dog River =

Dog River may refer to:

== Canada ==
- Dog River (Ontario), a river in Thunder Bay District, Ontario
- Dog River (Manitoba), a river in Northern Region, Manitoba
- Dog River, Saskatchewan, a fictional setting for the television series Corner Gas

== United States ==
- Dog River (Alabama), a tributary of Mobile Bay
- Dog River (Georgia), a tributary of the Chattahoochee River
- Dog River (Oregon), a tributary of the east branch of the Hood River
- Dog Salmon River, a tributary of the Ugashik River
- Hood River (Oregon), formerly known as Dog River
- Yellow Dog River, a river in Michigan

== Other ==
- Nahr al-Kalb, a river and gorge in Lebanon
- Dog River (album), 2007 collaboration album by Moka Only and Def3
