= The Dogs (American punk band) =

American proto-punk band

- Origin: Lansing, Michigan
- Genres: Proto-punk; punk; hard rock
- Years active: 1968–1981; 1983–1989; 2000–present
- Members: Loren Molinare; Mary Kay; Tony Matteucci
- Past members: Ron Wood

The Dogs are an American three-piece proto-punk band formed in Lansing, Michigan, in 1968. They are noted for presaging the energy and sound of the later punk and hardcore genres.

Originally formed by guitarist/vocalist Loren Molinare and bassist Mary Kay with drummer Ron Wood, and based in Lansing, The Dogs played with the rock and proto-punk bands of the time including Amboy Dukes, The Stooges, MC5, and The Up. The band relocated to Detroit in 1973, and then to New York City in 1974 where they played with other bands of the glam and pre-punk scenes such as KISS, The Dictators, Television, and The Stilettos (pre-Blondie).

The band moved again to the West Coast in 1976, releasing their debut 7” "John Rock" on California’s Dynamic Recording label, and playing with hard rock bands such as AC/DC and Van Halen as well as new wave groups like The Motels and Ramones. Moving to the UK in 1978, The Dogs toured Britain and Ireland, in support of second 7” Slash Your Face, self-released on the band’s own Detroit Records imprint that year.

The band returned to the U.S. in 1980 but went on hiatus in 1981 with the departure of their drummer; they reformed with new drummer Tony Matteucci in 1983, but went on hiatus again in 1989 when Molinaire joined Little Caesar.

Interest in the band revived following the inclusion of their songs on the Killed By Death compilation series, with their records subsequently becoming collector's items. Slash Your Face was reissued and the Fed Up compilation released on Bacchus Archives in 2001. The band reformed and new material followed on Dionysus Records in 2003 in the form of debut album proper Suburban Nightmare.

The Dogs toured the Far East in 2007 and 2013 in support of a series of releases on Japanese label Future Now Records, beginning with double CD tribute Doggy Style featuring covers of Dogs tracks by local groups and notable garage punks such as The Bellrays as well as unreleased Dogs material.

The band played SXSW festival in 2009 and 2014 and NXNE festival in 2009. Second album proper Hypersensitive was self-released in 2012 and a new EP Aint Going Nowhere in 2016.

== Discography ==
=== Singles and EPs ===
- ”John Rock”/"Younger Point of View" (Dynamic Recording/1976)
- Slash Your Face 7-inch EP (Detroit Records/1978) (Bacchus Archives/2001) (Last Laugh/2017) - "Slash Your Face"/"Fed Up"/"Are You A Boy Or A Girl?"
- ”Tough Enough”/"John Rock" (Brain Transplant/1998)
- ”Class of 1970”/"Rebel Rock" (Dionysus/2001)
- Ain’t Going Nowhere 7-inch EP (Smelvis Records/2016) - "Not Working For The CIA", "Call My Name", "Let's Go Baby"
- Welcome to the Revolution Digi Single (Die Laughing/2020)
- Split 7-inch with Glitter Trash (New Fortune) - "Something To Believe In" (with Jenna Talin)

=== Albums ===
- Suburban Nightmare LP/CD (Dionysus/2003)
- Hypersensitive CD (Detroit/2012)

=== Compilations ===
- Fed Up LP/CD (Bacchus Archives/2000) LP (Dionysus Records/2011) Cass. (Burger/2015)
- The Dogs Unleashed...Doggy Licks CD/DVD (Future Now/2013) - live recordings

=== Compilation appearances ===
- Saturday Night Pogo (Rhino-1978) - "Younger Point Of View"
- Killed by Death: Rare Punk 77-82 (Redrum-1988) - "Slash Your Face" (as Dogs)
- We're Desperate: The L.A. Scene (1976-79) (Rhino-1993) - "Younger Point Of View"
- Doggy Style 2XCD (Future Now-2007) - "LA Times (unreleased Live", "Motor City Theatre (unreleased Live)", "John Rock (unreleased Live) - The Dogs tribute album
- A Tale Of Rotten Orange (Orange Fight-2010) - "You Can't Catch Me"
- Tribute To Sonny Vincent 3XCD (Disturbed-2019) - "Call My Name"
- Internationale Top-Hits (BASF) - "Imagine Me Imagine You"
