= The Dogs, Wincanton =

The Dogs
- The Old House
- Location within Somerset
- 51°03′20″N 2°24′26″W
- Location: Wincanton, Somerset, England

History
- Built: c. 1650

Listed Building – Grade I
- Official name: The Dogs
- Designated: 24 March 1961
- Reference no.: 1273913

The Dogs (also known as The Old House) in Wincanton, Somerset, England was built around 1650 and has been designated as a Grade I listed building.

The name 'The Dogs' refers to two stone greyhounds, which were previously used as finials on the gateposts, but these have since disappeared. They represented the arms of the Churchey family who locally held the title Lord of the manor.

The two storey house was largely rebuilt in the 1740s by Nathaniel Ireson, but is one of the few buildings in the town known to predate a serious fire in 1707. It has a central range and two wings projecting towards the street. It has coped gables and mullioned windows. The house has elaborate scrolled cast iron gates.

William of Orange slept in one of the bedrooms for at least one night during the Glorious Revolution in 1688.

A Coachman's cottage was built for the house in 1838. In the 1930s a cinema was added by the owner of the house.

== See also ==
- List of Grade I listed buildings in South Somerset
