= Dog Hollow (Illinois) =

Valley in Illinois, United States

Coordinates: 37.549279°N 88.540429°W

Dog Hollow is a valley in Pope County, Illinois, in the United States.

Legend has it the hollow was so named on account of two settlers being chased there by a headless dog.
