= Dogs (French band) =

French punk rock/new wave band

- Origin: Rouen, France
- Genres: New wave, power pop, punk, indie rock
- Years active: 1973–2002

Dogs (a.k.a. Les Dogs) were a French punk rock/new wave band from Rouen, formed in 1973. Allmusic describes them as a "treasured cult band". Following two EPs in 1977/1978, their debut album Different was released in 1979 on Mercury Records; Different Shadows followed in 1980. The band continued with various line ups, releasing ten more albums before the death of vocalist – and only constant member – Dominique Laboubée, in 2002.

== Band line-ups ==
(1973–1975)	Dominique Laboubée – vocals, guitar (died 9 October 2002 from lung cancer); Paul Peschenaert – guitar, vocals; François Camuzeaux – bass; Michel Gross – drums
(1976–1977)	Dominique Laboubée – vocals, guitar; Hugues Urvoy de Portzamparc – bass, vocals; Michel Gross – drums
(1977–1978)	Dominique Laboubée – vocals, guitar; Jean-Yves Garin – guitar, vocals; Hugues Urvoy de Portzamparc – bass, vocals; Michel Gross – drums
(1978–1981)	Dominique Laboubée – vocals, guitar; Hugues Urvoy de Portzamparc – bass, vocals; Michel Gross – drums
(1981–1987)	Dominique Laboubée – vocals, guitar; Antoine Massy-Perrier – vocals, guitar; Hugues Urvoy de Portzamparc – bass, vocals; Michel Gross – drums
(1988–1992)	Dominique Laboubée – vocals, guitar; Antoine Massy-Perrier – vocals, guitar; Gene Clarksville – keyboard; Christian Rosset – bass, vocals; Bruno Lefaivre – drums
(1993–1996)	Dominique Laboubée – vocals, guitar; Christian Rosset – bass, vocals; Bruno Lefaivre – drums
(1996–2002)	Dominique Laboubée – vocals, guitar; Laurent Ciron – vocals, guitar; Christian Rosset – bass, vocals; Bruno Lefaivre – drums

== Discography ==
=== Albums ===
- 1979 – Different (Phonogram, 33 T)
- 1980 – Walking Shadows (Phonogram, 33 T)
- 1982 – Too Much Class for the Neighbourhood (Epic, 33 T)
- 1983 – Legendary Lovers (Epic, 33 T)
- 1985 – Shout (Epic, 33 T)
- 1986 – More, More, More (Epic, 33 T)
- 1988 – A Million Ways of Killing Time (New Rose, 33 T)
- 1993 – Three is a Crowd (Skydog / Mélodie, CD)
- 1998 – 4 of a Kind, Vol.1 (Hacienda, CD)
- 1999 – 4 of a Kind, Vol.2: A Different Kind (Hacienda, CD)
- 2001 – Short, Fast & Tight (Hacienda, Double CD)

=== Compilations ===
- 1987 – Shakin' with the Dogs – Compilation (Epic, 33 T)
- 2017 – Rehearsals 1974
