= Dogging (sexual slang) =

Engaging in sexual acts in a public or semi-public place, or spying on such acts

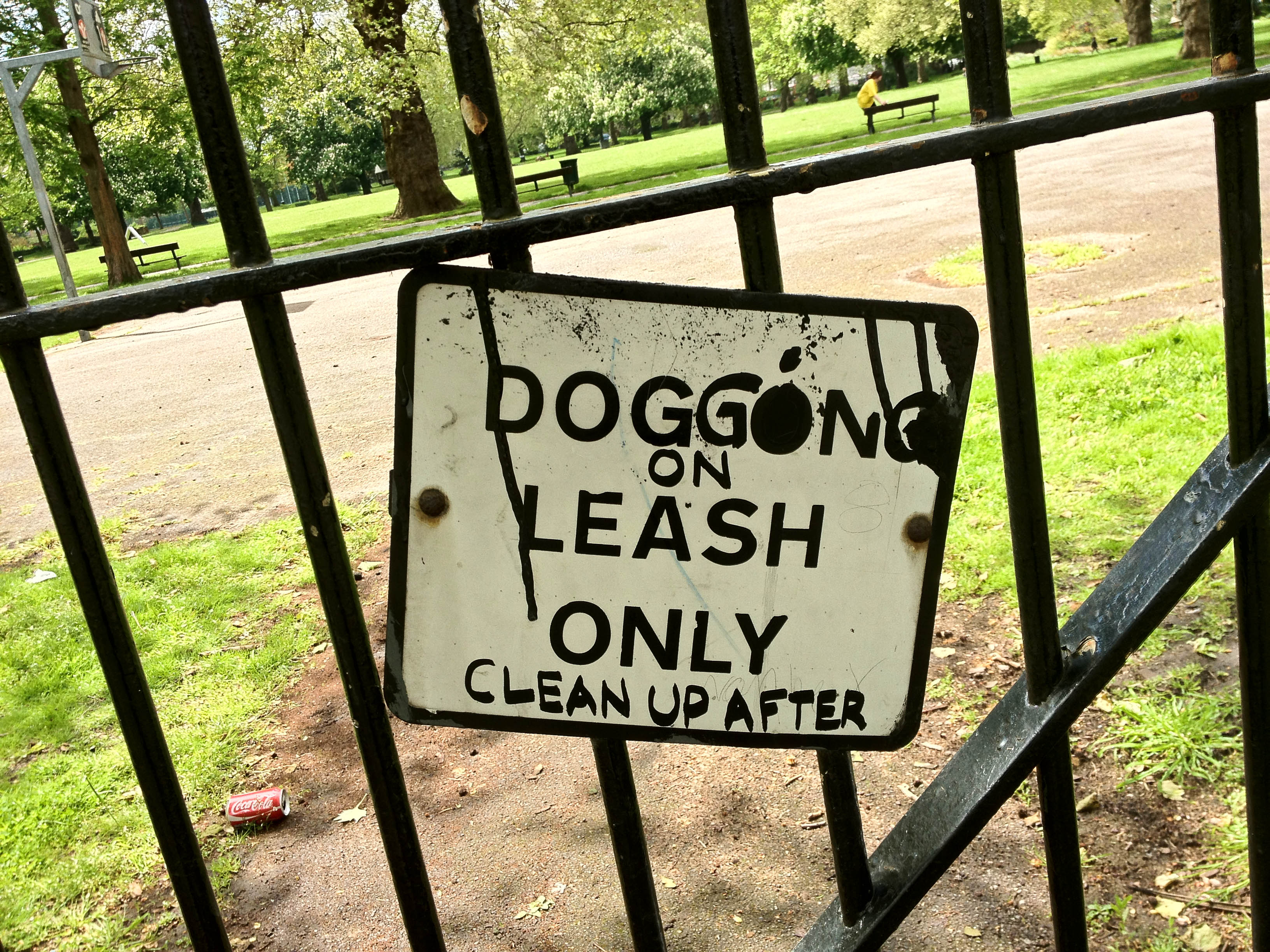
Vandalised "DOG ON LEASH ONLY" sign amended to refer to dogging, Kennington Park, London, 2012

Dogging is a British English slang term for engaging in sexual acts in a public or semi-public place or watching others doing so. There may be more than two participants; both group sex and gang banging can be included. As observation is encouraged, voyeurism and exhibitionism are closely associated with dogging. The people involved meet either randomly or, increasingly, arrange beforehand over the Internet to meet up.

In September 2003, BBC News reported on the "new" dogging craze. They cited the Internet and text messaging as common ways of organising meetings. The original definition of dogging—and which remains a closely related activity—is spying on couples having sex in a car or other public place, and the term had been in use on Britain's railways for many years. It would have been well-known at least as far back as 1951.

There is some evidence on the Internet that the "craze" has begun to spread to other countries, such as the United States, Canada, Australia, Barbados, Brazil, Denmark, the Netherlands, Norway, Poland, and Sweden.

== Legality ==
In the United Kingdom, dogging comes under laws related to voyeurism, exhibitionism, or public displays of sexual behaviour. Prosecution is possible for a number of offences such as Section 5 of the Public Order Act 1986, exposure under section 66 of the Sexual Offences Act 2003, or for the common law offence of outraging public decency. As of 2010, Association of Chief Police Officers (ACPO) policy was that arrests are a last resort and a more gradual approach should be taken in such circumstances. As such public sex in some areas of the UK sits in a slightly grey area legally: "…Public sex is a popular—and quasi-legal—activity in Britain, according to the authorities and to the large number of Web sites that promote it. (It is treated as a crime only if someone witnesses it, is offended and is willing to make a formal complaint.) And the police tend to tread lightly in public sex environments, in part because of the bitter legacy of the time when gay sex was illegal and closeted men having anonymous sex in places like public bathrooms were routinely arrested and humiliated."

== Terminology ==
The Sunday Herald of Scotland wrote in 2003, "The term dogging originated in the early 1970s to describe men who spied on couples having sex outdoors—these men would 'dog' the couples' every move and watch them." An alternative etymology posits dog walking as the origin of the term; audience members, and indeed participants, could use the ordinary exercise of their pets as cover for their sexual assignations.

== See also ==
- Casual sex
- Cottaging
- Hogging (sexual practice)
- Public Sex (film)
- Swinging (sexual practice)
- Troll (gay slang)
