= Counties 2 Dorset & Wilts North =

English rugby union league

Counties 2 Dorset & Wilts North / Central
- Current season or competition: 2025-26 Counties 2 Dorset & Wilts North
- Sport: Rugby union
- Instituted: 1987; 39 years ago (as Berks/Dorset/Wilts 1)
- Number of teams: 9
- Country: England
- Most titles: Bradford-on-Avon, Corsham (3 titles)
- Website: englandrugby.com

Counties 2 Dorset & Wilts North (formerly Dorset & Wilts 1 North) is an English rugby union league, forming part of the South West Division, for clubs primarily based in Wiltshire, sitting at tier 8 of the English rugby union system. Originally consisting of one league, Dorset & Wilts 1 split into North and South regional divisions in 2004. Teams based in Berkshire participated until 2001, when they left to join the Buckinghamshire & Oxon leagues. At the start of the 2022–23 campaign a Central Division was introduced, before being disbanded ahead of the 2025–26 season.

Promoted teams move up into Counties 1 Southern South while relegated teams tend to drop down into Counties 3 Dorset & Wilts North or Counties 3 Dorset & Wilts Central depending on location.

== 2026–27 ==
Combe Down departed, promoted to Counties 1 Southern South, while Melksham II (11th) and Amesbury (12th) were relegated to Counties 3 Dorset & Wilts Central.

Team	Ground	Capacity	Town/Village	Previous season
Alfred's Nomads (Marlborough 2nd XV)	The Common		Marlborough, Wiltshire	Relegated from Counties 1 Southern South
Bradford-on-Avon	Broom Ground		Winsley, Bradford-on-Avon, Wiltshire	3rd
Calne	Calne Recreation Ground		Calne, Wiltshire	9th
Fairford	Coln House School Playing Grounds		Fairford, Gloucestershire	10th
Minety	Minety Playing Fields		Minety, Wiltshire	4th
Pewsey Vale	The Angela Yeates Memorial Ground		Pewsey, Wiltshire	8th
Royal Wootton Bassett III	Ballard's Ash Sports Ground		Wootton Bassett, Wiltshire	7th
Supermarine	Supermarine Sports and Social Club		South Marston, Swindon, Wiltshire	6th
Sutton Benger	Recreation Ground		Sutton Benger, Wiltshire	5th
Swindon	Greenbridge Road		Swindon, Wiltshire	Relegated from Counties 1 Southern South
Swindon College Old Boys	Nationwide Sports Pavilion		Swindon, Wiltshire	Promoted from Counties 3 Dorset & Wilts North
Westbury	Knott Field		Westbury, Wiltshire	2nd

Locations of the 2026–27 Counties 2 Dorset & Wilts North teams

== 2025–26 ==
Ahead of the new season the Central division was disbanded with the teams reallocated to the North and South leagues. Trowbridge II were the last champions of the Central league, promoted to Counties 1 Southern South. Amesbury, Bradford-on-Avon and Westbury all moved on a level transfer to the North division while Wheatsheaf Cabin Crew and Yeovil level transferred to South. Frome II, Salisbury II and Avondale were relegated to Counties 3 Dorset & Wilts Central.

Departing from the North league were Alfred's Nomads (Marlborough 2nd XV) who defeated Oakmedians, champions of the South division 55–31 to be promoted to Counties 1 Southern South whilst Swindon College Old Boys (8th), Colerne (9th) and Devizes II (10th) were relegated to Counties 3 Dorset & Wilts North.

Team	Ground	Capacity	Town/Village	Previous season
Amesbury	Archers Way		Salisbury, Wiltshire	Level transfer from Central (4th)
Bradford-on-Avon	Broom Ground		Winsley, Bradford-on-Avon, Wiltshire	Level transfer from Central (5th)
Calne	Calne Recreation Ground		Calne, Wiltshire	7th
Combe Down	Holly's Corner		Combe Down, Bath, Somerset	Relegated from Counties 1 Southern South
Fairford	Coln House School Playing Grounds		Fairford, Gloucestershire	6th
Melksham II	The Conigre	1,000	Melksham, Wiltshire	Promoted from Counties 3 Dorset & Wilts Central
Minety	Minety Playing Fields		Minety, Wiltshire	5th
Pewsey Vale	The Angela Yeates Memorial Ground		Pewsey, Wiltshire	2nd
Royal Wootton Bassett III	Ballard's Ash Sports Ground		Wootton Bassett, Wiltshire	4th
Supermarine	Supermarine Sports and Social Club		South Marston, Swindon, Wiltshire	Promoted from Counties 3 Dorset & Wilts North
Sutton Benger	Recreation Ground		Sutton Benger, Wiltshire	3rd
Westbury	Knott Field		Westbury, Wiltshire	Level transfer from Central (6th)

Locations of the 2025-26 Counties 2 Dorset & Wilts North teams

== 2024–25 ==
=== North ===
Departing were Chippenham II promoted to Counties 1 Southern South whilst Supermarine (9th), were relegated to Counties 3 Dorset & Wilts North.

Team	Ground	Capacity	Town/Village	Previous season
Alfred's Nomads (Marlborough 2nd XV)	The Common		Marlborough, Wiltshire	Runners-up
Calne	Calne Recreation Ground		Calne, Wiltshire	8th
Colerne	Higgins Field		Colerne, Wiltshire	Promoted from Counties 3 Dorset & Wilts Central (Runners-up)
Devizes II	The Sports Club		Devizes, Wiltshire	Level transfer from Counties 2 D&W (Central) (7th)
Fairford	Coln House School Playing Grounds		Fairford, Gloucestershire	Promoted from Counties 3 Dorset & Wilts North (Champions)
Minety	Minety Playing Fields		Minety, Wiltshire	6th
Pewsey Vale	The Angela Yeates Memorial Ground		Pewsey, Wiltshire	5th
Royal Wootton Bassett III	Ballard's Ash Sports Ground		Wootton Bassett, Wiltshire	4th
Sutton Benger	Recreation Ground		Sutton Benger, Wiltshire	3rd
Swindon College Old Boys	Nationwide Sports Pavilion		Swindon, Wiltshire	7th

Locations of the 2024-25 Counties 2 Dorset & Wilts North teams

=== Central ===
Departing were Melksham, promoted to Southern Counties South, whilst Devizes II (7th) left on a level transfer to Counties 2 D&W North. Warminister (3rd) suffered a voluntary relegation to Counties 3 Dorset & Wilts Central.

Team	Ground	Capacity	Town/Village	Previous season
Amesbury	Archers Way		Salisbury, Wiltshire	8th
Avonvale	Bathford Playing Fields		Bathford, Bath, Somerset	Relegated from Counties 1 Southern South (12th)
Bradford-on-Avon	Broom Ground		Winsley, Bradford-on-Avon, Wiltshire	Promoted from Counties 3 Dorset & Wilts Central (Champions)
Frome II	Gypsy Lane		Frome, Somerset	5th
Salisbury II	Castle Road	1,500	Salisbury, Wiltshire	4th
Trowbridge II	Doric Park		Hilperton, Trowbridge, Wiltshire	6th
Westbury	Knott Field		Westbury, Wiltshire	Runners-up
Wheatsheaf Cabin Crew	Netherhampton Road		Netherhampton, Salisbury, Wiltshire	Level transfer from Counties 2 Dorset & Wilts South (6th)
Yeovil	Yeovil Showground		Yeovil, Somerset	Relegated from Counties 1 Southern South (11th)

Locations of the 2024-25 Counties 2 Dorset & Wilts Central teams

== 2023–24 ==
=== North ===
Departing were Devizes II (8th) who were level transferred to the Central division together with Swindon II (9th), relegated to Counties 3 Dorset & Wilts North.

Team	Ground	Capacity	Town/Village	Previous season
Alfred's Nomads (Marlborough 2nd XV)	The Common		Marlborough, Wiltshire	Runners-up
Calne	Calne Recreation Ground		Calne, Wiltshire	5th
Chippenham II	Allington Fields		Chippenham, Wiltshire	Champions (not promoted)
Minety	Minety Playing Fields		Minety, Wiltshire	4th
Pewsey Vale	The Angela Yeates Memorial Ground		Pewsey, Wiltshire	7th
Royal Wootton Bassett III	Ballard's Ash Sports Ground		Wootton Bassett, Wiltshire	6th
Supermarine	Supermarine Sports and Social Club		South Marston, Swindon, Wiltshire	Promoted from Counties 3 Dorset & Wilts North (Champions)
Sutton Benger	Recreation Ground		Sutton Benger, Wiltshire	3rd
Swindon College Old Boys	Nationwide Sports Pavilion		Swindon, Wiltshire	Relegated from Southern Counties North (11th)

Locations of the 2023-24 Counties 2 Dorset & Wilts North teams

=== Central ===
Departing were Corsham, promoted to Southern Counties South, Bradford-on-Avon (9th) were relegated to Counties 3 Tribute Dorset & Wilts Central, whilst North Dorset II (5th) and Wheatsheaf Cabin Crew (6th) left on a level transfer to Counties 2 Dorset & Wilts South.

Team	Ground	Capacity	Town/Village	Previous season
Amesbury	Archers Way		Salisbury, Wiltshire	4th
Devizes II	The Sports Club		Devizes, Wiltshire	Level transfer from Counties 2 D&W (North) (8th)
Frome II	Gypsy Lane		Frome, Somerset	Relegated from Counties 1 Southern South (12th)
Melksham	The Conigre	1,000	Melksham, Wiltshire	3rd
Salisbury II	Castle Road	1,500	Salisbury, Wiltshire	8th
Trowbridge II	Doric Park		Hilperton, Trowbridge, Wiltshire	Relegated from Counties 1 Southern South (10th)
Warminister	Folly Lane		Warminster, Wiltshire	Runners-up
Westbury	Knott Field		Westbury, Wiltshire	7th

Locations of the 2023-24 Counties 2 Dorset & Wilts Central teams

== 2022–23 ==
This was the first season following the RFU Adult Competition Review which saw the introduction of a new Central division.

=== North ===
Departing were Frome II, Trowbridge II and Royal Wootton Bassett II all promoted to Counties 1 Southern South. Melksham (4th), Westbury (10th) and Warminster (7th) moved to the new Central division.

Team	Ground	Capacity	Town/Village	Previous season
Alfred's Nomads (Marlborough 2nd XV)	The Common		Marlborough, Wiltshire	9th
Calne	Calne Recreation Ground		Calne, Wiltshire	11th
Chippenham II	Allington Fields		Chippenham, Wiltshire	5th
Devizes II	The Sports Club		Devizes, Wiltshire	Promoted from Dorset & Wilts 2 North (Runners-up)
Minety	Minety Playing Fields		Minety, Wiltshire	6th
Pewsey Vale	The Angela Yeates Memorial Ground		Pewsey, Wiltshire	Promoted from Dorset & Wilts 2 North (Champions)
Royal Wootton Bassett III	Ballard's Ash Sports Ground		Wootton Bassett, Wiltshire	Promoted from Dorset & Wilts 2 North (5th)
Sutton Benger	Recreation Ground		Sutton Benger, Wiltshire	8th
Swindon II	Greenbridge Road		Swindon, Wiltshire	12th

Locations of the 2022-23 Counties 2 Dorset & Wilts North teams

=== Central ===
Team	Ground	Capacity	Town/Village	Previous season
Amesbury	Archers Way		Salisbury, Wiltshire	Promoted from Dorset & Wilts 2 Central (Runners-up)
Bradford-on-Avon	Broom Ground		Winsley, Bradford-on-Avon, Wiltshire	Promoted from Dorset & Wilts 2 Central (3rd)
Corsham	Lacock Road		Corsham, Wiltshire	Relegated from Southern Counties South
Melksham	The Conigre	1,000	Melksham, Wiltshire	Level transfer from D&W1 North (4th)
North Dorset II	Slaughtergate	1,000	Gillingham, Dorset	Promoted from Dorset & Wilts 2 Central (4th)
Salisbury II	Castle Road	1,500	Salisbury, Wiltshire	Level transfer from Dorset & Wilts 1 South (11th)
Warminister	Folly Lane		Warminster, Wiltshire	Level transfer from D&W1 North (7th)
Westbury	Knott Field		Westbury, Wiltshire	Level transfer from D&W1 North (10th)
Wheatsheaf Cabin Crew	Netherhampton Road		Netherhampton, Salisbury, Wiltshire	Promoted from Dorset & Wilts 2 Central (champions)

Locations of the 2022-23 Counties 2 Dorset & Wilts Central teams

== 2021–22 ==
Team	Ground	Capacity	Town/Village	Previous season
Alfred's Nomads (Marlborough 2nd XV)	The Common		Marlborough, Wiltshire	9th
Calne	Calne Recreation Ground		Calne, Wiltshire	10th
Chippenham II	Allington Fields		Chippenham, Wiltshire	11th
Frome II	Gypsy Lane		Frome, Somerset	5th
Melksham	The Conigre	1,000	Melksham, Wiltshire	2nd
Minety	Minety Playing Fields		Minety, Wiltshire	8th
Royal Wootton Bassett II	Ballard's Ash Sports Ground	5,000	Wootton Bassett, Wiltshire	3rd
Sutton Benger	Recreation Ground		Sutton Benger, Wiltshire	4th
Swindon II	Greenbridge Road		Swindon, Wiltshire	Promoted from Dorset & Wilts 2 North (runners up)
Trowbridge II	Doric Park		Hilperton, Trowbridge, Wiltshire	7th
Warminster	Folly Lane		Warminster, Wiltshire	6th
Westbury	Knott Field		Westbury, Wiltshire	Promoted from Dorset & Wilts 2 North (champions)

Locations of the 2021-22 Dorset & Wilts 1 North teams

== 2020–21 ==
Due to the COVID-19 pandemic, the 2020–21 season was cancelled.

== 2019–20 ==
Team	Ground	Capacity	Town/Village	Previous season
Alfred's Nomads (Marlborough 2nd XV)	The Common		Marlborough, Wiltshire	Promoted from Dorset & Wilts 2 North (runners up)
Avonvale	Bathford Playing Fields		Bathford, Bath, Somerset	Runners up
Bradford-on-Avon	Broom Ground		Winsley, Bradford-on-Avon, Wiltshire	Relegated from Southern Counties South (12th)
Calne	Calne Recreation Ground		Calne, Wiltshire	10th
Chippenham II	Allington Fields		Chippenham, Wiltshire	9th
Frome II	Gypsy Lane		Frome, Somerset	Promoted from Dorset & Wilts 2 North (champions)
Melksham	The Conigre	1,000	Melksham, Wiltshire	3rd
Minety	Minety Playing Fields		Minety, Wiltshire	6th
Royal Wootton Bassett II	Ballard's Ash Sports Ground	5,000	Wootton Bassett, Wiltshire	5th
Sutton Benger	Recreation Ground		Sutton Benger, Wiltshire	8th
Trowbridge II	Doric Park		Hilperton, Trowbridge, Wiltshire	7th
Warminster	Folly Lane		Warminster, Wiltshire	4th

Locations of the 2019-20 Dorset & Wilts 1 North teams

== 2018–19 ==
Team	Ground	Capacity	Town/Village	Previous season
Avonvale	Bathford Playing Fields		Bathford, Bath, Somerset	3rd
Calne	Calne Recreation Ground		Calne, Wiltshire	Promoted from Dorset & Wilts 2 North (runners up)
Chippenham II	Allington Fields		Chippenham, Wiltshire	6th
Combe Down	Holly's Corner		Combe Down, Bath, Somerset	Runners up
Melksham	The Conigre	1,000	Melksham, Wiltshire	9th
Minety	Minety Playing Fields		Minety, Wiltshire	4th
Pewsey Vale	The Angela Yeates Memorial Ground		Pewsey, Wiltshire	8th
Royal Wootton Bassett II	Ballard's Ash Sports Ground		Wootton Bassett, Wiltshire	7th
Supermarine	Supermarine Sports and Social Club		South Marston, Swindon, Wiltshire	10th
Sutton Benger	Recreation Ground		Sutton Benger, Wiltshire	Promoted from Dorset & Wilts 2 North (champions)
Trowbridge II	Doric Park		Hilperton, Trowbridge, Wiltshire	11th
Warminster	Folly Lane		Warminster, Wiltshire	5th

Locations of the 2018-19 Dorset & Wilts 1 North teams

== 2017–18 ==
Team	Ground	Capacity	Town/Village	Previous season
Avonvale	Bathford Playing Fields		Bathford, Bath, Somerset	Promoted from Dorset & Wilts 2 North (champions)
Bradford-on-Avon	Broom Ground		Winsley, Bradford-on-Avon, Wiltshire	2nd
Chippenham II	Allington Fields		Chippenham, Wiltshire	9th
Combe Down	Holly's Corner		Combe Down, Bath, Somerset	Relegated from Southern Counties South (11th)
Melksham	The Conigre	1,000	Melksham, Wiltshire	3rd
Minety	Minety Playing Fields		Minety, Wiltshire	6th
Pewsey Vale	The Angela Yeates Memorial Ground		Pewsey, Wiltshire	4th
Royal Wootton Bassett II	Ballard's Ash Sports Ground	5,000	Wootton Bassett, Wiltshire	7th
Supermarine	Supermarine Sports and Social Club		South Marston, Swindon, Wiltshire	10th
Swindon II	Greenbridge Road		Swindon, Wiltshire	8th
Trowbridge II	Doric Park		Hilperton, Trowbridge, Wiltshire	Promoted from Dorset & Wilts 2 North (runners up)
Warminster	Folly Lane		Warminster, Wiltshire	5th

Locations of the 2017-18 Dorset & Wilts 1 North teams

== 2016–17 ==
=== Participating clubs ===
- Bradford-on-Avon (relegated from Southern Counties South)
- Chippenham II
- Corsham
- Devizes II
- Frome II
- Melksham
- Minety
- Pewsey Vale (promoted from Dorset & Wilts 2 North)
- Royal Wootton Bassett II
- Supermarine
- Swindon II
- Warminster

== 2015–16 ==
The 2015–16 Dorset & Wilts 1 North consists of twelve teams—most of which are based in the northern part of Wiltshire but also two teams that are based just across the county border in Gloucestershire and Somerset. The season starts on 12 September 2015 and is due to end on 23 April 2016.

=== Participating teams and location ===
Eight of the twelve teams participated in last season's competition. The 2014-15 champions, Marlborough were promoted to Southern Counties South while Calne, Cricklade and Pewsey Vale were all relegated to Dorset & Wilts 2 North.

Locations of the 2015-16 Dorset & Wilts 1 North teams

Team	Ground	Capacity	Town/Village	Previous season
Chippenham II	Allington Fields		Chippenham, Wiltshire	6th
Colerne	Higgins Field		Colerne, Wiltshire	Promoted from Dorset & Wilts 2 North (runners up)
Combe Down	Holly's Corner		Combe Down, Bath, Somerset	2nd
Corsham	Lacock Road		Corsham, Wiltshire	Relegated from Southern Counties South (11th)
Devizes II	The Sports Club		Devizes, Wiltshire	4th
Fairford	Coln House School Playing Fields		Fairford, Gloucestershire	9th
Melksham	The Conigre	1,000	Melksham, Wiltshire	3rd
Minety	Minety Playing Fields		Minety, Wiltshire	8th
Royal Wootton Bassett II	Ballard's Ash Sports Ground	5,000	Wootton Bassett, Wiltshire	Promoted from Dorset & Wilts 2 North (champions)
Supermarine	Supermarine Sports and Social Club		South Marston, Swindon, Wiltshire	Relegated from Southern Counties South (12th)
Swindon II	Greenbridge Road		Swindon, Wiltshire	5th
Trowbridge II	Doric Park		Hilperton, Trowbridge, Wiltshire	7th

== Participating clubs 2014–15 ==
- Calne
- Chippenham II
- Combe Down
- Crickdale
- Devizes II
- Fairford
- Marlborough
- Melksham
- Minety
- Pewsey Vale
- Trowbridge II
- Swindon II

== Original teams ==
When league rugby began in 1987 this division (known as Berks/Dorset/Wilts 1) contained the following teams from Berkshire, Dorset and Wiltshire:

- Aldermaston
- Dorchester
- Devizes
- Hungerford
- Marlborough
- Royal Wootton Bassett
- R.E.M.E. Arborfield
- Sherborne
- Swanage & Wareham
- Weymouth (Note: Weymouth RFC would later be known as Weymouth & Portland RFC.)

== Dorset & Wilts 1 North honours ==
=== Berks/Dorset/Wilts 1 (1987–1993) ===
Originally Dorset & Wilts 1 North and Dorset & Wilts 1 South were combined in a single division known as Berks/Dorset/Wilts 1, involving clubs based in Berkshire, (Note: Since 2000, Berkshire clubs have played in the Berks/Bucks & Oxon leagues.) Dorset and Wiltshire. It was a tier 8 league with promotion to Southern Counties and relegation to Berks/Dorset/Wilts 2.

Berks/Dorset/Wilts 1
Season	No of teams	Champions	Runners–up	Relegated team(s)	Ref
1987–88	10	Swanage & Wareham	Devizes	Hungerford	
1988–89	11	Bracknell	Dorchester	Marlborough	
1989–90	11	Sherborne	Corsham	R.E.M.E. Arborfield	
1990–91	11	Dorchester	Devizes	Lytchett Minster, Puddletown, Aldermaston	
1991–92	11	Bracknell	Chippenham	No relegation (Note: There was no relegation as league due to increase from 11 to 13 teams for the following season.)	
1992–93	13	Royal Wootton Bassett	Swindon	Bournemouth University	
Green backgrounds are promotion places.

=== Berks/Dorset/Wilts 1 (1993–1996) ===
The creation of National League 5 South for the 1993–94 season meant that Berks/Dorset/Wilts 1 dropped to become a tier 9 league. Promotion continued to Southern Counties and relegation to Berks/Dorset/Wilts 2.

Berks/Dorset/Wilts 1
Season	No of teams	Champions	Runners–up	Relegated team(s)	Ref
1993–94	13	Devizes	Swindon	Puddletown, Bradford-on-Avon, North Dorset	
1994–95	13	Swindon	Melksham	Swindon College	
1995–96	13	Blandford	Royal Wootton Bassett (Note: The cancellation of National League 5 South at the end of the 1995–96 season meant that six clubs were promoted including Marlborough, Corsham, North Dorset and Redingensians.)	No relegation (Note: Restructuring caused by the cancellation of National League 5 South meant that there was no relegation.)	
Green backgrounds are promotion places.

=== Berks/Dorset/Wilts 1 (1996–2000) ===
The cancellation of National League 5 South at the end of the 1995–96 season meant that Berks/Dorset/Wilts 1 reverted to being a tier 8 league. Further restructuring meant that promotion was now to Southern Counties South, (Note: Southern Counties was split into Southern Counties North and Southern Counties South as part of RFU restructuring at the end of the 1995–96 season.) while relegation continued to Berks/Dorset/Wilts 2.

Berks/Dorset/Wilts 1
Season	No of teams	Champions	Runners–up	Relegated team(s)	Ref
1996–97	10	Weymouth	Westbury	Supermarine, Lytchett Minster	
1997–98	10	Tadley	Redingensians	Marlborough, Aldermaston	
1998–99	10	Ivel Barbarians	Swindon College Old Boys	Weymouth, East Dorset, Thatcham	
1999–2000	10	Swindon	Corsham	Calne, Blandford	
Green backgrounds are promotion places.

=== Dorset & Wilts 1 (2000–2004) ===
At the end of the 1999–2000 season the division became known as Dorset & Wilts 1 following the departure of Berkshire clubs to join the Bucks & Oxon leagues. It remained a tier 8 league with promotion to Southern Counties South and relegation to either Dorset & Wilts 2 North or Dorset & Wilts 2 South (both formerly part of Berks/Dorset/Wilts 2).

Dorset & Wilts 1
Season	No of teams	Champions	Runners–up	Relegated team(s)	Ref
2000–01	8	Frome	Oakmeadians	North Dorset	
2001–02	8	Westbury	Calne	Bridport	
2002–03	8	Trowbridge	Swindon College Old Boys	No relegation (Note: No relegation due to league expansion from 8 teams to 10.)	
2003–04	10	Sherborne	Bradford-on-Avon	No relegation (Note: No relegation due to league restructure the following season as the league would split into 2 regional leagues - Dorset & Wilts 1 North and Dorset & Wilts 1 South.)	
Green backgrounds are promotion places.

=== Dorset & Wilts 1 North (2004–2009) ===
Ahead of the 2004–05 season, local league restructuring saw Dorset & Wilts 1 split into two tier 8 regional divisions - Dorset & Wilts 1 North and Dorset & Wilts 1 South. Promotion continued to Southern Counties South, while relegation was now to Dorset & Wilts 2 North.

Dorset & Wilts 1 North
Season	No of Teams	Champions	Runners–up	Relegated team(s)	Ref
2004–05	10	Corsham	Melksham	Marlborough, Hungerford	
2005–06	11	Supermarine	Calne	Malmesbury, Pewsey Vale	
2006–07	11	Corsham	Calne	Colerne	
2007–08	12	Bradford-on-Avon	Minety	Trowbridge II	
2008–09	12	Devizes	Chippenham II	Fairford	
Green backgrounds are promotion places.

=== Dorset & Wilts 1 North (2009–present) ===
Despite widespread restructuring by the RFU at the end of the 2008–09 season, Dorset & Wilts 1 North remained a tier 8 league, with promotion continuing to Southern Counties South and relegation to Dorset & Wilts 2 North.

Dorset & Wilts 1 North
Season	No of Teams	Champions	Runners–up	Relegated Teams	Ref
2009–10	12	Marlborough	Chippenham II	Corsham II, Swindon II	
2010–11	12	Melksham	Chippenham II	Cricklade, Royal Wootton Bassett II	
2011–12	12	Chippenham II (Note: Not promoted as Chippenham 1st team in the league above.)	Supermarine	Bath Saracens, Fairford, Sutton Benger	
2012–13	12	Chippenham II (Note: Not promoted as Chippenham 1st team in the league above.)	Pewsey Vale	Avonvale, Marlborough	
2013–14	12	Bradford-on-Avon	Minety	No relegation	
2014–15	12	Marlborough	Combe Down	Calne, Cricklade	
2015–16	12	Combe Down	Corsham	Colerne, Fairford	
2016–17	12	Corsham	Bradford-on-Avon	Devizes II, Frome II	
2017–18	12	Bradford-on-Avon	Combe Down	Swindon II	
2018–19	12	Combe Down	Avonvale	Supermarine, Pewsey Vale	
2019–20	12	Avonvale	Melksham	Bradford-on-Avon, Chippenham II	
2020–21	12				
Green backgrounds are promotion places.

== Number of league titles ==
- Bradford-on-Avon (3)
- Corsham (3)
- Bracknell (2) (Note: Both of Bracknell's titles were won when league was known as Berks/Dorset/Wilts 1.)
- Chippenham II (2)
- Combe Down (2)
- Devizes (2) (Note: One of Devizes titles was when the league was known as Berks/Dorset/Wilts 1.)
- Marlborough (2)
- Sherborne (2) (Note: One of Sherborne's title was won when the league was known as Berks/Dorset/Wilts 1, the other when the league was known as Dorset & Wilts 1.)
- Swindon (2) (Note: Both of Swindon's titles was won when league was known as Berks/Dorset/Wilts 1.)
- Avonvale (1)
- Blandford (1) (Note: Blandford's title was won when league was known as Berks/Dorset/Wilts 1.)
- Dorchester (1) (Note: Dorchester's title was won when league was known as Berks/Dorset/Wilts 1.)
- Frome (1) (Note: Frome's title was won when league was known as Dorset & Wilts 1.)
- Ivel Barbarians (1) (Note: Ivel Barbarians title was won when league was known as Berks/Dorset/Wilts 1. Ivel Barbarians are now known as Yeovil Rugby Club.)
- Melksham (1)
- Royal Wootton Bassett (1) (Note: Royal Wootton Bassett's title was won when league was known as Berks/Dorset/Wilts 1.)
- Supermarine (1)
- Swanage & Wareham (1) (Note: Swanage & Wareham's title was won when league was known as Berks/Dorset/Wilts 1.)
- Tadley (1) (Note: Tadley's title was won when league was known as Berks/Dorset/Wilts 1.)
- Trowbridge (1) (Note: Trowbridge's title was won when league was known as Berks/Dorset/Wilts 1.)
- Westbury (Note: Westbury's title was won when league was known as Dorset & Wilts 1.)
- Weymouth (1) (Note: Weymouth's title was won when league was known as Berks/Dorset/Wilts 1.)

== See also ==
- South West Division RFU
- Dorset & Wilts RFU
- English rugby union system
- Rugby union in England
