= Counties 2 Dorset & Wilts South =

English rugby union league

- Current season or competition: 2025–26 Counties 2 Dorset & Wilts South
- Sport: Rugby union
- Instituted: 1987; 39 years ago (as Berks/Dorset/Wilts 1)
- Country: England
- Most titles: Blandford, Dorchester, Ivel Barbarians (3 titles)
- Website: englandrugby.com

Counties 2 Dorset & Wilts South (formerly Dorset & Wilts 1 South) is an English Rugby Union league, forming part of the South West Division, for clubs primarily based in Dorset, sitting at tier 8 of the English rugby union system. Originally a single league, Dorset & Wilts 1 split into North and South regional divisions in 2004. Teams based in Berkshire participated until 2001 when they left to join the Buckinghamshire & Oxon leagues.

Promoted teams move up to Counties 1 Southern South, while relegated teams drop to Counties 3 Dorset & Wilts South or sometimes Counties 3 Dorset & Wilts Central.

== 2026–27 ==
Dorchester departed, promoted to Counties 1 Southern South, while Swanage & Wareham II (11th) were relegated to Counties 3 Dorset & Wilts South.

Team	Ground	Capacity	Town/Village	Previous season
Blandford	Larksmead Recreation Ground		Blandford, Dorset	Promoted from Counties 3 Dorset & Wilts South
Bridport	Brewery Fields		Bridport, Dorset	5th
East Dorset Dockers	Iford Lane		Christchurch, Dorset	6th
Frome II	Gypsy Lane		Frome, Somerset	Promoted from Counties 3 Dorset & Wilts Central (champions)
Lytchett Minster	Lytchett Park		Lytchett Minster, Poole, Dorset	3rd
North Dorset II	Slaughtergate	1,000	Gillingham, Dorset	Promoted from Counties 3 Dorset & Wilts Central (runners-up)
Oakmeadians	Meyrick Park		Bournemouth, Dorset	2nd
Puddletown	Enterprise Park		Piddlehinton, Dorset	10th
Weymouth & Portland	Monmouth Avenue		Weymouth, Dorset	9th
Wheatsheaf Cabin Crew	Netherhampton Road		Netherhampton, Salisbury, Wiltshire	8th
Wimborne II	Leigh Park		Wimborne, Dorset	4th
Yeovil	Yeovil Showground		Yeovil, Somerset	7th

Locations of the 2026-27 Counties 2 Dorset & Wilts South teams

== 2025–26 ==
There was no promotion as Oakmedians lost the playoff to Alfred's Nomads (Marlborough 2nd XV) 31-55 which saw the winners promoted to Counties 1 Southern South.

Blandford (9th) were relegated to Counties 3 Dorset & Wilts South while North Dorset II were relegated to Counties 3 Dorset & Wilts Central.

Bournemouth III (promoted from Counties 3 Dorset & Wilts South) started the season but later withdrew from the league, leaving eleven sides to contest the outstanding fixtures.

Team	Ground	Capacity	Town/Village	Previous season
Bridport	Brewery Fields		Bridport, Dorset	4th
Dorchester	Coburg Road		Dorchester, Dorset	Relegated from Counties 1 Southern South (11th)
East Dorset Dockers	Iford Lane		Christchurch, Dorset	7th
Lytchett Minster	Lytchett Park		Lytchett Minster, Poole, Dorset	5th
Oakmeadians	Meyrick Park		Bournemouth, Dorset	Champions (lost playoff)
Puddletown	Enterprise Park		Piddlehinton, Dorset	8th
Swanage & Wareham II	Bestwall Rd		Wareham, Dorset	6th
Weymouth & Portland	Monmouth Avenue		Weymouth, Dorset	2nd
Wheatsheaf Cabin Crew	Netherhampton Road		Netherhampton, Salisbury, Wiltshire	Level transfer from Counties 2 Dorset & Wilts Central (3rd)
Wimborne II	Leigh Park		Wimborne, Dorset	3rd
Yeovil	Yeovil Showground		Yeovil, Somerset	Level transfer from Counties 2 Dorset & Wilts Central (2nd)

Locations of the 2025-26 Counties 2 Dorset & Wilts South teams

== 2024–25 ==
Departing were Ellingham & Ringwood II (9th), relegated to Counties 3 Dorset & Wilts South. Wheatsheaf Cabin Crew (6th) moved on a level transfer Counties 2 Dorset & Wilts 2 Central.

Team	Ground	Capacity	Town/Village	Previous season
Blandford	Larksmead Recreation Ground		Blandford, Dorset	Runners-up
Bridport	Brewery Fields		Bridport, Dorset	7th
East Dorset Dockers	Iford Lane		Christchurch, Dorset	8th
Lytchett Minster	Lytchett Park		Lytchett Minster, Poole, Dorset	Champions (not promoted)
North Dorset II	Slaughtergate	1,000	Gillingham, Dorset	4th
Oakmeadians	Meyrick Park		Bournemouth, Dorset	3rd
Puddletown	Enterprise Park		Piddlehinton, Dorset	Promoted from Counties 3 Dorset & Wilts South
Swanage & Wareham II	Bestwall Rd		Wareham, Dorset	Promoted from Counties 3 Dorset & Wilts South
Weymouth & Portland	Monmouth Avenue		Weymouth, Dorset	Relegated from Counties 1 Southern South
Wimborne II	Leigh Park		Wimborne, Dorset	5th

Locations of the 2024–25 Counties 2 Dorset & Wilts South teams

== 2023–24 ==
Departing were Weymouth & Portland promoted to Counties 1 Southern South. Puddletown (7th) and Swanage & Wareham II (8th) were relegated to Counties 3 Dorset & Wilts South.

Team	Ground	Capacity	Town/Village	Previous season
Blandford	Larksmead Recreation Ground		Blandford, Dorset	Relegated from Counties 1 Southern South
Bridport	Brewery Fields		Bridport, Dorset	5th
East Dorset Dockers	Iford Lane		Christchurch, Dorset	6th
Ellingham & Ringwood II	Parsonage Barn Lane		Ringwood, Hampshire	Promoted from Counties 3 Dorset & Wilts South
Lytchett Minster	Lytchett Park		Lytchett Minster, Poole, Dorset	3rd
North Dorset II	Slaughtergate	1,000	Gillingham, Dorset	Level transfer from Counties 2 Dorset & Wilts 2 Central
Oakmeadians	Meyrick Park		Bournemouth, Dorset	Runners-up
Wheatsheaf Cabin Crew	Netherhampton Road		Netherhampton, Salisbury, Wiltshire	Level transfer from Counties 2 Dorset & Wils 2 Central
Wimborne II	Leigh Park		Wimborne, Dorset	4th

Locations of the 2023–24 Counties 2 Dorset & Wilts South teams

== 2022–23 ==
This was the first season following the RFU Adult Competition Review.

Departing were North Dorset and Blandford promoted to Counties 1 Southern South, Salisbury II (11th) moved on a level transfer to Counties 2 Dorset & Wils 2 Central, Sherborne II (12th) were relegated to Counties 3 Tribute Dorset & Wilts Central whilst Bournemouth III (8th) returned to merit league rugby.

Team	Ground	Capacity	Town/Village	Previous season
Bridport	Brewery Fields		Bridport, Dorset	9th
East Dorset Dockers	Iford Lane		Christchurch, Dorset	6th
Lytchett Minster	Lytchett Park		Lytchett Minster, Poole, Dorset	Promoted from Dorset & Wilts 2 South
Oakmeadians	Meyrick Park		Bournemouth, Dorset	4th
Puddletown	Enterprise Park		Piddlehinton, Dorset	5th
Swanage & Wareham II	Bestwall Rd		Wareham, Dorset	7th
Weymouth & Portland	Monmouth Avenue		Weymouth, Dorset	3rd
Wimborne II	Leigh Park		Wimborne, Dorset	10th

Locations of the 2022–23 Counties 2 Dorset & Wilts South teams

== 2021–22 ==
Dorset Dockers (2nd in 2019-20) and East Dorset (11th in Dorset & Wilts 2 South in 2019-20) merged to form East Dorset Dockers for season 2021-22.

Sherborne II (5th in 2019-20) started but later withdrew leaving eleven sides to complete the remaining fixtures.

Team	Ground	Capacity	Town/Village	Previous season
Blandford	Larksmead Recreation Ground		Blandford, Dorset	4th
Bournemouth III	Chapel Gate		Bournemouth, Dorset	7th
Bridport	Brewery Fields		Bridport, Dorset	Promoted from Dorset & Wilts 2 South (champions)
East Dorset Dockers	Iford Lane		Christchurch, Dorset	2nd
North Dorset	Slaughtergate	1,000	Gillingham, Dorset	Relegated from Southern Counties South (12th)
Oakmeadians	Meyrick Park		Bournemouth, Dorset	6th
Puddletown	Enterprise Park		Piddlehinton, Dorset	10th
Salisbury II	Castle Road	1,500	Salisbury, Wiltshire	9th
Swanage & Wareham II	Bestwall Rd		Wareham, Dorset	11th
Weymouth & Portland	Monmouth Avenue		Weymouth, Dorset	3rd
Wimborne II	Leigh Park		Wimborne, Dorset	8th

Locations of the 2021-22 Dorset & Wilts 1 South teams

== 2020–21 ==
Due to the COVID-19 pandemic, the 2020–21 season was cancelled.

== 2019–20 ==
Team	Ground	Capacity	Town/Village	Previous season
Blandford	Larksmead Recreation Ground		Blandford, Dorset	5th
Bournemouth III	Chapel Gate		Bournemouth, Dorset	7th
Dorchester	Coburg Road		Dorchester, Dorset	Relegated from Southern Counties South (11th)
Dorset Dockers	Potterne Park		Verwood, Dorset	Runners up
Lytchett Minster	Lytchett Park		Lytchett Minster, Poole, Dorset	Promoted from Dorset & Wilts 2 South (runners up)
Oakmedians	Meyrick Park		Bournemouth, Dorset	3rd
Puddletown	Enterprise Park		Piddlehinton, Dorset	Promoted from Dorset & Wilts 2 South (runners up)
Salisbury II	Castle Road	1,500	Salisbury, Wiltshire	9th
Sherborne II	Gainsborough Park		Sherborne, Dorset	8th
Swanage & Wareham II	Bestwall Road		Wareham, Dorset	Promoted from Dorset & Wilts 2 South (3rd)
Weymouth & Portland	Monmouth Avenue		Weymouth, Dorset	6th
Wimborne II	Leigh Park		Wimborne, Dorset	4th

Locations of the 2019-20 Dorset & Wilts 1 South teams

== 2018–19 ==
Team	Ground	Capacity	Town/Village	Previous season
Blandford	Larksmead Recreation Ground		Blandford, Dorset	Relegated from Southern Counties South (12th)
Bournemouth III	Chapel Gate		Bournemouth, Dorset	3rd
Bridport	Brewery Fields		Bridport, Dorset	10th
Dorset Dockers	Potterne Park		Verwood, Dorset	Runners up
Oakmedians	Meyrick Park		Bournemouth, Dorset	6th
Puddletown	Enterprise Park		Piddlehinton, Dorset	Promoted from Dorset & Wilts 2 South (runners up)
Salisbury II	Castle Road	1,500	Salisbury, Wiltshire	5th
Sherborne II	Gainsborough Park		Sherborne, Dorset	Promoted from Dorset & Wilts 2 South (champions)
Swanage & Wareham	Bestwall Road		Wareham, Dorset	Relegated from Southern Counties South (11th)
Weymouth & Portland	Monmouth Avenue		Weymouth, Dorset	9th
Wimborne II	Leigh Park		Wimborne, Dorset	4th

Locations of the 2018-19 Dorset & Wilts 1 South teams

== 2017–18 ==
Team	Ground	Capacity	Town/Village	Previous season
Bournemouth III	Chapel Gate		Bournemouth, Dorset	6th
Bridport	Brewery Fields		Bridport, Dorset	Promoted from Dorset & Wilts 2 South (3rd)
Dorchester	Coburg Road		Dorchester, Dorset	4th
Dorset Dockers	Potterne Park		Verwood, Dorset	Relegated from Southern Counties South (12th)
New Milton II	Normans Way		Ashley, New Milton, Hampshire	Promoted from Dorset & Wilts 2 South (champions)
Lytchett Minster	Lytchett Park		Lytchett Minster, Poole, Dorset	9th
North Dorset II	Slaughtergate	1,000	Gillingham, Dorset	10th
Oakmedians	Meyrick Park		Bournemouth, Dorset	8th
Salisbury II	Castle Road	1,500	Salisbury, Wiltshire	3rd
Swanage & Wareham II	Bestwall Road		Wareham, Dorset	7th
Weymouth & Portland	Monmouth Avenue		Weymouth, Dorset	5th
Wimborne II	Leigh Park		Wimborne, Dorset	2nd

Locations of the 2017-18 Dorset & Wilts 1 South teams

== 2016–17 ==
- Bournemouth III
- Dorchester (relegated from Southern Counties South)
- East Dorset
- Lytchett Minster
- New Milton & District II
- North Dorset II
- Oakmedians
- Salisbury II
- Sherborne II
- Swanage & Wareham II
- Weymouth & Portland (promoted from Dorset & Wilts 2 South)
- Wimborne II
- Yeovil (promoted from Dorset & Wilts 2 South)

== 2015–16 ==
The 2015–16 Dorset & Wilts 1 South consisted of twelve teams; nine based in Dorset, two in south Wiltshire and one from Somerset. The season started on 12 September 2015 and ended on 23 April 2016.

Eight of the twelve teams participated in last season's competition. The 2014-15 champions, Dorset Dockers were promoted to Southern Counties South while Yeovil were relegated to Dorset & Wilts 2 South and Westbury to Dorset & Wilts 2 North.

Locations of the 2015-16 Dorset & Wilts 1 South teams in Dorset
Locations of the 2015-16 Dorset & Wilts 1 South teams in Somerset & Wiltshire

Team	Ground	Capacity	Town/Village	Previous season
Blandford	Larksmead Rugby Pitches		Blandford Forum, Dorset	4th
Bournemouth II	Chapel Gate		Bournemouth, Dorset	2nd
East Dorset	Iford Lane Playing Fields		Bournemouth, Dorset	Promoted from Dorset & Wilts 2 South (champions)
Frome II	Gypsy Lane		Frome, Somerset	7th
Lytchett Minster	Lytchett Park		Lytchett Minster, Poole, Dorset	5th
New Milton II	Normans Way		Ashley, New Milton, Hampshire	
North Dorset II	Slaughtergate	1,000	Gillingham, Dorset	9th
Oakmedians	Meyrick Park		Bournemouth, Dorset	8th
Salisbury II	Castle Road		Salisbury, Wiltshire	Promoted from Dorset & Wilts 2 South (runners up)
Sherborne II	Gainsborough Park		Sherborne, Dorset	3rd
Swanage & Wareham II	Bestwall Road		Wareham, Dorset	Promoted from Dorset & Wilts 2 South (3rd)
Warminster	Folly Lane		Warminster, Wiltshire	10th
Wimborne II	Leigh Park		Wimborne, Dorset	6th

== 2014–15 ==
- Blandford
- Bournemouth II
- Dorset Dockers
- Frome II
- Ivel Barbarians
- Lytchett Minster
- North Dorset II
- Oakmeadians
- Sherborne II
- Warminster
- Westbury
- Wimborne II

== 2012–13 ==
- Blandford
- Bournemouth II
- Bridport
- Ivel Barbarians
- North Dorset II
- Oakmeadians II
- Salisbury II
- Sherborne II
- Swanage & Wareham II
- Warminster
- Westbury
- Wimborne II

== Original teams ==
When league rugby began in 1987 this division (known as Berks/Dorset/Wilts 1) contained the following teams from Berkshire, Dorset and Wiltshire:

- Aldermaston
- Dorchester
- Devizes
- Hungerford
- Marlborough
- Royal Wootton Bassett
- R.E.M.E.
- Sherborne
- Swanage & Wareham
- Weymouth (Note: Weymouth RFC would later be known as Weymouth & Portland RFC.)

== Dorset & Wilts 1 South honours ==
=== Berks/Dorset/Wilts 1 (1987–1993) ===
Originally Dorset & Wilts 1 North and Dorset & Wilts 1 South were combined in a single division known as Berks/Dorset/Wilts 1, involving clubs based in Berkshire (Note: Since 2000, Berkshire clubs have played in the Berks/Bucks & Oxon leagues.), Dorset and Wiltshire. It was a tier 8 league with promotion to Southern Counties and relegation to Berks/Dorset/Wilts 2.

Berks/Dorset/Wilts 1
Season	No of teams	Champions	Runners–up	Relegated team(s)	Ref
1987–88	10	Swanage & Wareham	Devizes	Hungerford	
1988–89	11	Bracknell	Dorchester	Marlborough	
1989–90	11	Sherborne	Corsham	R.E.M.E. Arborfield	
1990–91	11	Dorchester	Devizes	Lytchett Minster, Puddletown, Aldermaston	
1991–92	11	Bracknell	Chippenham	No relegation (Note: There was no relegation as league due to increase from 11 to 13 teams for the following season.)	
1992–93	13	Royal Wootton Bassett	Swindon	Bournemouth University	
Green backgrounds are promotion places.

=== Berks/Dorset/Wilts 1 (1993–1996) ===
The creation of National League 5 South for the 1993–94 season meant that Berks/Dorset/Wilts 1 dropped to become a tier 9 league. Promotion continued to Southern Counties and relegation to Berks/Dorset/Wilts 2.

Berks/Dorset/Wilts 1
Season	No of teams	Champions	Runners–up	Relegated team(s)	Ref
1993–94	13	Devizes	Swindon	Puddletown, Bradford-on-Avon, North Dorset	
1994–95	13	Swindon	Melksham	Swindon College Old Boys	
1995–96	13	Blandford	Royal Wootton Bassett (Note: The cancellation of National League 5 South at the end of the 1995–96 season meant that six clubs were promoted including Marlborough, Corsham, North Dorset and Redingensians.)	No relegation (Note: Restructuring caused by the cancellation of National League 5 South meant that there was no relegation.)	
Green backgrounds are promotion places.

=== Berks/Dorset/Wilts 1 (1996–2000) ===
The cancellation of National League 5 South at the end of the 1995–96 season meant that Berks/Dorset/Wilts 1 reverted to being a tier 8 league. Further restructuring meant that promotion was now to Southern Counties South (Note: Southern Counties was split into Southern Counties North and Southern Counties South as part of RFU restructuring at the end of the 1995–96 season.), while relegation continued to Berks/Dorset/Wilts 2.

Berks/Dorset/Wilts 1
Season	No of teams	Champions	Runners–up	Relegated team(s)	Ref
1996–97	10	Weymouth	Westbury	Supermarine, Lytchett Minster	
1997–98	10	Tadley	Redingensians	Marlborough, Aldermaston	
1998–99	10	Ivel Barbarians	Swindon College Old Boys	Weymouth & Portland, East Dorset, Thatcham	
1999–00	10	Swindon	Corsham	Calne, Blandford	
Green backgrounds are promotion places.

=== Dorset & Wilts 1 (2000–2004) ===
At the end of the 1999–00 season the division became known as Dorset & Wilts 1 following the departure of Berkshire clubs to join the Bucks & Oxon leagues. It remained a tier 8 league with promotion to Southern Counties South and relegation to either Dorset & Wilts 2 North or Dorset & Wilts 2 South (both formerly part of Berks/Dorset/Wilts 2).

Dorset & Wilts 1
Season	No of teams	Champions	Runners–up	Relegated team(s)	Ref
2000–01	8	Frome	Oakmeadians	North Dorset	
2001–02	8	Westbury	Calne	Bridport	
2002–03	8	Trowbridge	Swindon College Old Boys	No relegation (Note: No relegation due to league expansion from 8 teams to 10.)	
2003–04	10	Sherborne	Bradford-on-Avon	No relegation (Note: No relegation due to league restructure the following season as the league would split into 2 regional leagues - Dorset & Wilts 1 North and Dorset & Wilts 1 South.)	
Green backgrounds are promotion places.

=== Dorset & Wilts 1 South (2004–2009) ===
Ahead of the 2004–05 season, local league restructuring saw Dorset & Wilts 1 split into two tier 8 regional divisions: Dorset & Wilts 1 North and Dorset & Wilts 1 South. Promotion continued to Southern Counties South, while relegation was now to Dorset & Wilts 2 South.

Dorset & Wilts 1 South
Season	No of Teams	Champions	Runners–up	Relegated team(s)	Ref
2004–05	10	Blandford	Weymouth & Portland	Dorchester II, Swanage & Wareham III	
2005–06	11	Bournemouth II	Swanage & Wareham II	Wincanton, Ivel Barbarians II, Oakmeadians II	
2006–07	9	Ivel Barbarians	Swanage & Wareham II	No relegation (Note: No relegation as division restructured from 9 to 11 teams for the next season.)	
2007–08	11	Swanage & Wareham II (Note: Not promoted as Swanage & Wareham 1st team in league above.)	Salisbury II	Blandford	
2008–09	11	Dorchester II	Bridport	Wimborne II	
Green backgrounds are promotion places.

=== Dorset & Wilts 1 South (2009–present) ===
Despite widespread restructuring by the RFU at the end of the 2008–09 season, Dorset & Wilts 1 South remained a tier 8 league, with promotion continuing to Southern Counties South and relegation to Dorset & Wilts 2 South.

Dorset & Wilts 1 South
Season	No of Teams	Champions	Runners–up	Relegated team(s)	Ref
2009–10	12	Bridport	Weymouth & Portland	Puddletown, Salisbury II	
2010–11	11	Blandford	Weymouth & Portland	Wimborne II, Westbury	
2011–12	12	Weymouth & Portland	Warminster	Ellingham & Ringwood II, Frome II, Bournemouth III	
2012–13	11	Ivel Barbarians	North Dorset II	Oakmeadians II	
2013–14	12	Wimborne II (Note: Not promoted as Wimborne 1st team in league above.)	Blandford	Salisbury II, Swanage & Wareham II, East Dorset	
2014–15	12	Dorset Dockers	Bournemouth II	Westbury, Ivel Barbarians	
2015–16	12	Bournemouth II	Blandford (Note: Runners up Blandford promoted as champions Bournemouth II declined promotion.)	Swanage & Wareham II, East Dorset	
2016–17	12	Yeovil	Wimborne II	East Dorset, Sherborne II	
2017–18	12	Dorchester	Dorset Dockers	Lytchett Minster, New Milton II, Swanage & Wareham II (Note: Swanage & Wareham II were relegated despite finishing 7th due to the Swanage & Wareham 1st XV being relegated from Southern Counties South for the following season.)	
2018–19	11 (Note: Reduced from 12 to 11 teams after North Dorset II withdrew from league.)	Swanage & Wareham	Dorset Dockers	Bridport	
2019–20	12	Dorchester	Dorset Dockers	Lytchett Minster, Swanage & Wareham II	
2020–21	12				
Green backgrounds are promotion places.

== Number of league titles ==
- Blandford (3) (Note: One of Blandford's titles was won when league was known as Berks/Dorset/Wilts 1.)
- Dorchester (3) (Note: One of Dorchester's titles was won when league was known as Berks/Dorset/Wilts 1.) (Note: Dorcester have won four titles overall - three by the 1st team and one by the 2nd team.)
- Ivel Barbarians (3) (Note: One of Ivel Barbarians titles was won when league was known as Berks/Dorset/Wilts 1. Ivel Barbarians are now known as Yeovil Rugby Club.)
- Bracknell (2) (Note: Both of Bracknell's titles were won when league was known as Berks/Dorset/Wilts 1.)
- Bournemouth II (2)
- Sherborne (2) (Note: One of Sherborne's title was when the league was known as Berks/Dorset/Wilts 1, the other when league was known as Dorset & Wilts 1.)
- Swanage & Wareham (2) (Note: One of Swanage & Wareham's titles was won when league was known as Berks/Dorset/Wilts 1.) (Note: Swanage & Wareham have won three titles overall - two by the 1st team and one by the 2nd team.)
- Swindon (2) (Note: Both of Swindon's titles was won when league was known as Berks/Dorset/Wilts 1.)
- Weymouth & Portland (2) (Note: One of Weymouth & Portland's titles was won when league was known as Berks/Dorset/Wilts 1.)
- Bridport (1)
- Devizes (1) (Note: Devizes title was won when the league was known as Berks/Dorset/Wilts 1.)
- Dorchester II (1)
- Dorset Dockers (1)
- Frome (1) (Note: Frome's title was won when league was known as Dorset & Wilts 1.)
- Royal Wootton Bassett (1) (Note: Royal Wootton Bassett's title was won when league was known as Berks/Dorset/Wilts 1.)
- Swanage & Wareham II (1)
- Swindon (1) (Note: Swindon's title was won when league was known as Berks/Dorset/Wilts 1.)
- Trowbridge (1) (Note: Trowbridge's title was won when league was known as Berks/Dorset/Wilts 1.)
- Westbury (Note: Westbury's title was won when league was known as Dorset & Wilts 1.)
- Wimborne II (1)
- Yeovil (1)

== See also ==
- South West Division RFU
- Dorset & Wilts RFU
- English rugby union system
- Rugby union in England
