= Counties 3 Dorset & Wilts South =

English rugby union league

- Current season or competition: 2024–25 Counties 3 Dorset & Wilts South
- Sport: Rugby union
- Instituted: 1987; 39 years ago (as Berks/Dorset/Wilts 2)
- Country: England
- Most titles: Blandford, Bournemouth III, Bournemouth University, Bridport, East Dorset, North Dorset, Oakmeadians II, Sherborne II (2 titles)
- Website: englandrugby.com

Counties 3 Dorset & Wilts South (formerly Dorset & Wilts 2 South) is an English Rugby Union league, forming part of the South West Division, for clubs primarily based in Dorset, sitting at tier 9 of the English rugby union system.

Promoted teams typically move up to Counties 2 Dorset & Wilts South or occasionally to Counties 2 Dorset & Wilts Central. Relegated teams used to drop to Dorset & Wilts 3 South but since that division was cancelled at the end of the 2018–19 season there has been no relegation.

== 2026-27 ==
Departing were Blandford promoted to Counties 2 Dorset & Wilts South. Leaving were Swanage & Wareham III (8th) who were displaced by Swanage & Wareham II being relegated into the league.

Team	Ground	Capacity	Town/Village	Previous season
Bournemouth III	Chapel Gate		Bournemouth, Dorset	Re-entry
Dorchester II	Coburg Road		Dorchester, Dorset	6th
East Dorset Dockers 2XV	Iford Lane		Christchurch, Dorset	New entry
Lytchett Minster II	Lytchett Park		Lytchett Minster, Poole, Dorset	4th
Oakmedians II	Meyrick Park		Bournemouth, Dorset	5th
Poole	Recreation Ground		Hamworthy, Poole, Dorset	7th
Sherborne II	Gainsborough Park		Sherborne, Dorset	2nd
Swanage & Wareham II	Bestwall Rd		Wareham, Dorset	Relegated from Counties 2 Dorset & Wilts South
Wimborne III	Leigh Park		Wimborne, Dorset	3rd

Locations of the 2026-27 Counties 3 Dorset & Wilts South teams

== 2025–26 ==
Departing were Bournemouth III promoted to Counties 2 Dorset & Wilts South. Also leaving were Ellingham & Ringwood II (3rd) on a level transfer to Counties 3 Hampshire.

Team	Ground	Capacity	Town/Village	Previous season
Blandford	Larksmead Recreation Ground		Blandford, Dorset	Relegated from Counties 2 D&W South (9th)
Dorchester II	Coburg Road		Dorchester, Dorset	8th
Lytchett Minster II	Lytchett Park		Lytchett Minster, Poole, Dorset	7th
Oakmedians II	Meyrick Park		Bournemouth, Dorset	4th
Poole	Recreation Ground		Hamworthy, Poole, Dorset	5th
Sherborne II	Gainsborough Park		Sherborne, Dorset	2nd
Swanage & Wareham III	Bestwall Rd		Wareham, Dorset	9th
Wimborne III	Leigh Park		Wimborne, Dorset	6th

Locations of the 2025–26 Counties 3 Dorset & Wilts South teams

== 2024–25 ==
Departing were Swanage & Wareham II and Puddletown, both promoted to Counties 2 Dorset & Wilts South while Salisbury III (7th) returned to merit league rugby.

Team	Ground	Capacity	Town/Village	Previous season
Bournemouth III	Chapel Gate		Bournemouth, Dorset	4th
Dorchester II	Coburg Road		Dorchester, Dorset	6th
Ellingham & Ringwood II	Parsonage Barn Lane		Ringwood, Hampshire	Relegated from Counties 2 D&W South (9th)
Lytchett Minster II	Lytchett Park		Lytchett Minster, Poole, Dorset	Promoted from Group 1 Dorset & Wilts Matrix
Oakmedians II	Meyrick Park		Bournemouth, Dorset	5th
Poole	Recreation Ground		Hamworthy, Poole, Dorset	8th
Sherborne II	Gainsborough Park		Sherborne, Dorset	3rd
Swanage & Wareham III	Bestwall Rd		Wareham, Dorset	New entry
Wimborne III	Leigh Park		Wimborne, Dorset	Promoted from Group 1 Dorset & Wilts Matrix

Locations of the 2024–25 Counties 3 Dorset & Wilts South teams

== 2023–24 ==
Departing were Ellingham & Ringwood II promoted to Counties 2 Dorset & Wilts South.

Bournemouth III re-joined the league pyramid having most recently competed in Dorset & Wilts 1 South in season 2021–22.

Team	Ground	Capacity	Town/Village	Previous season
Bournemouth III	Chapel Gate		Bournemouth, Dorset	Re-entry
Dorchester II	Coburg Road		Dorchester, Dorset	Runners-up
Oakmedians II	Meyrick Park		Bournemouth, Dorset	3rd
Poole	Recreation Ground		Hamworthy, Poole, Dorset	4th
Puddletown	Enterprise Park		Piddlehinton, Dorset	Relegated from Counties 2 D&W South (7th)
Salisbury III	Castle Road	1,500	Salisbury, Wiltshire	5th
Sherborne II	Gainsborough Park		Sherborne, Dorset	Level transfer from Counties 3 D&W Central (3rd)
Swanage & Wareham II	Bestwall Rd		Wareham, Dorset	Relegated from Counties 2 Dorset & Wilts South

Locations of the 2023–24 Counties 3 Dorset & Wilts South teams

== 2022–23 ==
Departing were Lytchett Minster promoted to Counties 2 Dorset & Wilts South, Christchurch (runners-up) moved to Counties 4 Hampshire whilst Wimborne III (7th), Swanage & Wareham III (8th) and East Dorset Dockers II (9th) returned to merit league rugby.

Team	Ground	Capacity	Town/Village	Previous season
Dorchester II	Coburg Road		Dorchester, Dorset	4th
Ellingham & Ringwood II	Parsonage Barn Lane		Ringwood, Hampshire	5th
Oakmedians II	Meyrick Park		Bournemouth, Dorset	6th
Poole	Recreation Ground		Hamworthy, Poole, Dorset	3rd
Salisbury III	Castle Road	1,500	Salisbury, Wiltshire	Level transfer from Counties 3 D&W Central (9th)

Locations of the 2022–23 Counties 3 Dorset & Wilts South teams

== 2021–22 ==
Dorset Dockers and East Dorset (11th in 2019–20) merged ahead of the current season to form East Dorset Dockers.

North Dorset II, Salisbury III and Wheatsheaf Cabin Crew did not return as all were level transferred to the newly formed Dorset & Wilts 2 Central for the current season.

Team	Ground	Capacity	Town/Village	Previous season
Christchurch	East Sports And Social Club		Christchurch, Dorset	Promoted from Dorset & Wilts South Matrix 2
Dorchester II	Coburg Road		Dorchester, Dorset	7th
East Dorset Dockers II	Iford Lane Playing Fields		Bournemouth, Dorset	11th
Ellingham & Ringwood II	Parsonage Barn Lane		Ringwood, Hampshire	3rd
Lytchett Minster	Lytchett Park		Lytchett Minster, Poole, Dorset	Relegated from Dorset & Wilts 1 South (12th)
Oakmedians II	Meyrick Park		Bournemouth, Dorset	6th
Poole	Recreation Ground		Hamworthy, Poole, Dorset	4th
Swanage & Wareham III	Bestwall Road		Wareham, Dorset	10th
Wimborne III	Leigh Park		Wimborne, Dorset	8th

Locations of the 2021–22 Dorset & Wilts 2 South teams

== 2020–21 ==
Due to the COVID-19 pandemic, the 2020–21 season was cancelled.

== 2019–20 ==
Team	Ground	Capacity	Town/Village	Previous season
Bridport	Brewery Fields		Bridport, Dorset	Relegated from Dorset & Wilts 1 South (11th)
Dinton (Note: Dinton would later drop out of the 2019–20 Dorset & Wilts 2 South.)	The Recreation Ground		Dinton, Wiltshire	7th
Dorchester II	Coburg Road		Dorchester, Dorset	Champions (not promoted) (Note: Despite finishing as champions Dorchester II were denied promotion due to the Dorcester 1st XV being relegated into Dorset & Wilts 1 South from Southern Counties South.)
East Dorset	Iford Lane Playing Fields		Bournemouth, Dorset	9th
Ellingham & Ringwood II	Parsonage Barn Lane		Ringwood, Hampshire	5th
North Dorset II	Slaughtergate	1,000	Gillingham, Dorset	Relegated from Dorset & Wilts 1 South (dropped out)
Oakmedians II	Meyrick Park		Bournemouth, Dorset	11th
Poole	Recreation Ground		Hamworthy, Poole, Dorset	Promoted from Dorset & Wilts 3 South (runners up)
Salisbury III	Castle Road	1,500	Salisbury, Wiltshire	6th
Swanage & Wareham III	Bestwall Road		Wareham, Dorset	Promoted from Dorset & Wilts 3 South (3rd)
Wheatsheaf Cabin Crew	Netherhampton Road		Netherhampton, Salisbury, Wiltshire	4th
Wimborne III	Leigh Park		Wimborne, Dorset	10th

Locations of the 2019–20 Dorset & Wilts 2 South teams

== 2018–19 ==
Team	Ground	Capacity	Town/Village	Previous season
Dinton	The Recreation Ground		Dinton, Wiltshire	5th
Dorchester II	Coburg Road		Dorchester, Dorset	6th
East Dorset	Iford Lane Playing Fields		Bournemouth, Dorset	4th
Ellingham & Ringwood II	Parsonage Barn Lane		Ringwood, Hampshire	7th
Lytchett Minster	Lytchett Park		Lytchett Minster, Poole, Dorset	Relegated from Dorset & Wilts 1 South (12th)
New Milton II	Normans Way		Ashley, New Milton, Hampshire	Relegated from Dorset & Wilts 1 South (11th)
North Dorset III	Slaughtergate	1,000	Gillingham, Dorset	Promoted from Dorset & Wilts 3 South (champions)
Oakmedians II	Meyrick Park		Bournemouth, Dorset	10th
Salisbury III	Castle Road	1,500	Salisbury, Wiltshire	3rd
Swanage & Wareham II	Bestwall Road		Wareham, Dorset	Relegated from Dorset & Wilts 1 South (7th) (Note: Despite finishing 7th Swanage & Wareham II were relegated due to the Swanage & Wareham 1st XV being relegated into Dorset & Wilts 1 South from Southern Counties South.)
Wheatsheaf Cabin Crew	Netherhampton Road		Netherhampton, Salisbury, Wiltshire	9th
Wimborne III	Leigh Park		Wimborne, Dorset	Promoted from Dorset & Wilts 3 South (runners up)

Locations of the 2018–19 Dorset & Wilts 2 South teams

== 2017–18 ==
Team	Ground	Capacity	Town/Village	Previous season
Blandford II	Larksmead Rugby Pitches		Blandford Forum, Dorset	Promoted from Dorset & Wilts 3 South (runners up)
Dinton	The Recreation Ground		Dinton, Wiltshire	Promoted from Dorset & Wilts 3 South (3rd)
Dorchester II	Coburg Road		Dorchester, Dorset	9th
East Dorset	Iford Lane Playing Fields		Bournemouth, Dorset	Relegated from Dorset & Wilts 1 South (12th)
Ellingham & Ringwood II	Parsonage Barn Lane		Ringwood, Hampshire	6th
New Milton III	Normans Way		Ashley, New Milton, Hampshire	Promoted from Dorset & Wilts 3 South (champions)
Oakmedians II	Meyrick Park		Bournemouth, Dorset	7th
Puddletown	Enterprise Park		Piddlehinton, Dorset	4th
Salisbury III	Castle Road	1,500	Salisbury, Wiltshire	2nd (not promoted)
Sherborne II	Gainsborough Park		Sherborne, Dorset	Relegated from Dorset & Wilts 1 South (11th)
Wheatsheaf Cabin Crew	Netherhampton Road		Netherhampton, Salisbury, Wiltshire	5th

Locations of the 2017–18 Dorset & Wilts 2 South teams

== 2016–17 ==
- Bridport
- Bournemouth IV
- Dorchester II
- Ellinghan & Ringwood II
- Dorset Dockers II (promoted from Dorset & Wilts 3 South)
- Lytchett Minster II (promoted from Dorset & Wilts 3 South)
- New Milton II
- North Dorset III
- Oakmedians II
- Puddletown
- Salisbury III
- Wheatsheaf Cabin Crew

== 2015–16 ==
The 2015–16 Dorset & Wilts 2 South consisted of twelve teams; seven based in Dorset, three from Hampshire and one each from Somerset and Wiltshire. The season started on 12 September 2015 and ended on 23 April 2016.

Eight of the twelve teams participated in last season's competition. The 2014–15 champions, East Dorset were promoted to Dorset & Wilts 1 South along with Salisbury II (2nd) and Swanage & Wareham II (3rd), while North Dorset III and Wimborne III were relegated to Dorset & Wilts 3 South.

Locations of the 2015–16 Dorset & Wilts 2 South teams in Dorset, Hampshire, Somerset & Wiltshire

Team	Ground	Capacity	Town/Village	Previous season
Bournemouth III	Chapel Gate		Bournemouth, Dorset	7th
Bridport	Brewery Fields		Bridport, Dorset	5th
Dorchester II	Coburg Road		Dorchester, Dorset	8th
Ellingham & Ringwood II	Parsonage Barn Lane		Ringwood, Hampshire	9th
Fordingbridge II	The Recreation Ground		Fordingbridge, Hampshire	Promoted from Dorset & Wilts 3 South (3rd)
New Milton II	Normans Way		Ashley, New Milton, Hampshire	10th
North Dorset III	Slaughtergate	1,000	Gillingham, Dorset	12th (not relegated)
Poole	Recreation Ground		Hamworthy, Poole, Dorset	Promoted from Dorset & Wilts 3 South (runners up)
Puddletown	Enterprise Park		Piddlehinton, Dorset	6th
Weymouth & Portland	Monmouth Avenue		Weymouth, Dorset	4th
Wheatsheaf Cabin Crew	Netherhampton Road		Netherhampton, Salisbury, Wiltshire	Promoted from Dorset & Wilts 3 South (champions)
Yeovil	Yeovil Showground		Yeovil, Somerset	Relegated from Dorset & Wilts 1 South (11th)

== 2012–13 ==
- Dorchester II
- East Dorset
- Ellingham & Ringwood II
- Fordingbridge
- Frome II
- New Milton II
- North Dorset III
- Poole
- Puddletown
- Weymouth II

== Original teams ==
When league rugby began in 1987, this division (known as Berks/Dorset/Wilts 2) contained the following teams from Berkshire, Dorset and Wiltshire:

- Bradford-on-Avon
- Chippenham
- Corsham
- Lytchett Minster
- Minety
- North Dorset
- Oakmedians
- Poole
- Puddletown
- Swindon College Old Boys
- Supermarine
- Trowbridge

== Dorset & Wilts 2 South honours ==
=== Berks/Dorset/Wilts 2 (1987–1993) ===
Originally Dorset & Wilts 2 North and Dorset & Wilts 2 South were combined in a single division known as Berks/Dorset/Wilts 2, involving clubs based in Berkshire, (Note: Since 2000, Berkshire clubs have played in the Berks/Bucks & Oxon leagues.) Dorset and Wiltshire. It was a tier 9 league with promotion to Berks/Dorset/Wilts 1 and, from the 1988–89 season onward, relegation was to either Berks/Dorset/Wilts 3 East or Berks/Dorset/Wilts 3 West.

Berks/Dorset/Wilts 2
Season	No of teams	Champions	Runners–up	Relegated team(s)	Ref
1987–88	12	Chippenham	Corsham	No relegation	
1988–89	11	North Dorset	Puddletown	Minety	
1989–90	11	Melksham	Lytchett Minster	Poole	
1990–91	11	D.I.H.E.	Swindon College Old Boys	R.E.M.E. Arborfield, Trowbridge, Westbury	
1991–92	11	Aldermaston	Lytchett Minster (Note: Restructuring of the south-west leagues from 11 to 13 teams for the following season, meant that four teams were promoted, including Bradford-on-Avon and Puddleton.)	No relegation (Note: The restructuring of Berks/Dorset/Wilts 3 East and Berks/Dorset/Wilts 3 West into a single season called Berks/Dorsets/Wilts 3, meant that there was no relegation.)	
1992–93	13	Supermarine	Marlborough	Berkshire Shire Hall	
Green backgrounds are promotion places.

=== Berks/Dorset/Wilts 2 (1993–1996) ===
The creation of National League 5 South for the 1993–94 season meant that Berks/Dorset/Wilts 2 dropped to become a tier 10 league. Promotion continued to Berks/Dorset/Wilts 1, while relegation was now to Berks/Dorset/Wilts 3. (Note: Prior to the 1992–93 season Berks/Dorset/Wilts 3 was divided into two regional divisions - Berks/Dorset/Wilts 3 East and Berks/Dorset/Wilts 3 West.)

Berks/Dorset/Wilts 2
Season	No of teams	Champions	Runners–up	Relegated team(s)	Ref
1993–94	13	Blandford	Thatcham	Minety, Hungerford	
1994–95	13	Bournemouth University (Note: Champions Bournemouth University were not promoted.)	North Dorset	Poole	
1995–96	13	Trowbridge	Calne (Note: 3rd place Westbury also promoted.)	Bournemouth University, Puddletown, Warminster (Note: Restructuring of the Berks, Dorset & Wilts leagues, including a reduction of teams in each division, meant that more teams were relegated than usual.)	
Green backgrounds are promotion places.

=== Berks/Dorset/Wilts 2 (1996–2000) ===
The cancellation of National League 5 South at the end of the 1995–96 season meant that Berks/Dorset/Wilts 2 reverted to being a tier 9 league. Promotion continued to Berks/Dorset/Wilts 1 and relegation to Berks/Dorset/Wilts 3.

Berks/Dorset/Wilts 2
Season	No of teams	Champions	Runners–up	Relegated team(s)	Ref
1996–97	8	Tadley	Ivel Barbarians	Pewsey Vale	
1997–98	10	Swindon College Old Boys	Portcastrians	Supermarine, Berkshire Shire Hall	
1998–99	9	Minety	Bridport	Hungerford, Puddletown, Marlborough	
1999–00	8	Thatcham	Oakmeadians	No relegation (Note: There would be no relegation due to the cancellation of Berks/Dorset/Wilts 3 at the end of the season.)	
Green backgrounds are promotion places.

=== Dorset & Wilts 2 South (2000–2004) ===
At the end of the 1999–00 season Berks/Wilts/Dorset 2 was restructured following the departure of Berkshire clubs to join the Bucks & Oxon leagues. It was now split into two tier 9 regional leagues - Dorset & Wilts 2 North and Dorset & Wilts 2 South. Promotion from Dorset & Wilts 2 South was now to Dorset & Wilts 2 and there was no relegation due to the cancellation of Berks/Wilts/Dorset 3.

Dorset & Wilts 2 South
Season	No of teams	Champions	Runners–up	Relegated team(s)	Ref
2000–01	8	Blandford	Martock	No relegation	
2001–02	6	Sherborne	Weymouth & Portland	No relegation	
2002–03	6	North Dorset	Bridport	No relegation	
2003–04	9	Bridport	Martock	No relegation	
Green backgrounds are promotion places.

=== Dorset & Wilts 2 South (2004–2009) ===
Ahead of the 2004–05 season, local league restructuring meant that promotion from Dorset & Wilts 2 South was now to Dorset & Wilts 1 South (formerly Dorset & Wilts 1) and relegation to the newly introduced Dorset & Wilts 3 South (last known as Berks/Dorset/Wilts 3). It remained a tier 9 league.

Dorset & Wilts 2 South
Season	No of teams	Champions	Runners–up	Relegated team(s)	Ref
2004–05	11	Wincanton	Salisbury III	Multiple teams (Note: Weymouth & Portland II, North Dorset III, Dorchester III and Blandford II were the relegated teams this year. The reason so many teams were relegated was due to the creation of a new division (Dorset & Wilts 3 North & South) for the following season.)	
2005–06	10	Salisbury III (Note: Not promoted as Salisbury 2nd team in division above.)	Swanage & Wareham III	Bridport II, Oakmeadians Vets, Poole	
2006–07	10	Bournemouth III (Note: Not promoted as Bournemouth 2nd team in division above.)	North Dorset III	Wincanton, Sherborne II, Wheatsheaf Cabin Crew	
2007–08	9	Sherborne II	Wimborne III	Chard II	
2008–09	10	Oakmeadians II	Bridport II	Wimborne III	
Green backgrounds are promotion places.

=== Dorset & Wilts 2 South (2009–present) ===
Despite widespread restructuring by the RFU at the end of the 2008–09 season, Dorset & Wilts 2 South remained a tier 9 league, with promotion continuing to Dorset & Wilts 1 South and relegation to Dorset & Wilts 3 South until that division was abolished at the end of the 2018–19 season.

Dorset & Wilts 2 South
Season	No of teams	Champions	Runners–up	Relegated team(s)	Ref
2009–10	11	Bournemouth III	Sherborne II	Lytchett Minster II	
2010–11	12	Salisbury II	Ellingham & Ringwood II	Multiple teams (Note: Bridport II, Dorchester II, South Wilts and Swanage & Wareham III were the relegated teams this year. The reason for so many relegated teams was due to the creation of a new Dorset & Wilts 4 division for the following season.)	
2011–12	10	Oakmeadians II	Wimborne II	Wincanton, Wheatsheaf Cabin Crew	
2012–13	10	East Dorset	Frome II	Fordingbridge II	
2013–14	11	Dorset Dockers	Lytchett Minster	Frome III (Note: After finishing the season bottom of the league - Frome III chose to drop to Tribute Somerset 3 South instead of Dorset & Wilts 3 South.) , Oakmeadians II, Poole	
2014–15	12	East Dorset	Salisbury II	North Dorset III, Wimborne III	
2015–16	12	Yeovil	Weymouth & Portland	Fordingbridge II, Poole	
2016–17	10	New Milton II	Salisbury III (not promoted) (Note: Salisbury III finished as runners up but were not promoted as Salisbury II were in the division above. 3rd place Bridport were promoted instead.)	Lytchett Minster II, Dorchester II	
2017–18	11	Sherborne II	Puddletown	Blandford II, New Milton III (Note: Despite finishing 8th New Milton III were relegated due to New Milton II being relegated into Dorset & Wilts 2 South from Dorset & Wilts 1 South.)	
2018–19	12	Dorchester II (Note: Champions Dorchester II were not promoted into Dorset & Wilts 1 North due to the Dorcester 1st XV being relegated into that division from Southern Counties South.)	Lytchett Minster (Note: 3rd place Swanage & Wareham II also promoted.)	No relegation (Note: No relegation due to dissolution of Dorset & Wilts 3 South at the end of the season. As North Dorset II were relegated into the division, North Dorset III dropped out of the league.)	
2019–20	11 (Note: League reduced from 12 to 11 teams after Dinton drop out of the league. New Milton II would also transfer into Hampshire 2.)	Bridport	Wheatsheaf Cabin Crew	No relegation	
2020–21	11				
Green backgrounds are promotion places.

== Number of league titles ==
- Blandford (2) (Note: One of Blandford's titles was won when the league was known as Berks/Dorset/Wilts 2.)
- Bournemouth III (2)
- Bournemouth University (2) (Note: Bournemouth University were formerly known as Dorset Institute of Higher Education (D.I.H.E.). Both titles were won when the league was known as Berks/Dorset/Wilts 2.)
- Bridport (2)
- East Dorset (2)
- North Dorset (2) (Note: One of North Dorset's titles was won when the league was known as Berks/Dorset/Wilts 2.)
- Oakmeadians II (2)
- Sherborne II (2) (Note: Sherborne have won three titles overall - two by the 2nd team and one by the 1st team.)
- Aldermaston (1) (Note: Aldermaston's title was won when the league was known as Berks/Dorset/Wilts 2.)
- Chippenham (1) (Note: Chippenham's title was won when the league was known as Berks/Dorset/Wilts 2.)
- Dorchester II (1)
- Dorset Dockers (1)
- Melksham (1) (Note: Melksham's title was won when the league was known as Berks/Dorset/Wilts 2.)
- Minety (1) (Note: Minety's title was won when the league was known as Berks/Dorset/Wilts 2.)
- New Milton II (1)
- Salisbury II (1) (Note: Salisbury have won two titles overall - one by the 2nd team and one by the 3rd team.)
- Salisbury III (1)
- Sherborne (1)
- Supermarine (1) (Note: Supermarine's title was won when the league was known as Berks/Dorset/Wilts 2.)
- Swindon College Old Boys (1) (Note: Swindon College Old Boys title was won when the league was known as Berks/Dorset/Wilts 2.)
- Tadley (1) (Note: Tadley's title was won when the league was known as Berks/Dorset/Wilts 2.)
- Thatcham (1) (Note: Thatcham's title was won when the league was known as Berks/Dorset/Wilts 2.)
- Trowbridge (1) (Note: Trowbridge's title was won when the league was known as Berks/Dorset/Wilts 2.)
- Wincanton (1)
- Yeovil (1)

== See also ==
- South West Division RFU
- Dorset & Wilts RFU
- English rugby union system
- Rugby union in England
