= Regional 2 South Central =

Level six rugby union league in England

- Current season or competition: 2026–27 Regional 2 South Central
- Sport: Rugby union
- Instituted: 2022
- Number of teams: 12
- Country: England
- Holders: Bournemouth (2025–26)
- Most titles: Marlborough, Jersey, Farnham and Bournemouth (1 title)

Regional 2 South Central is a level six league in the English rugby union system, one of twelve leagues, at this level. Originally part of the South West Division of the RFU, the league was transferred to the London & SE Division for season 2023–24, with a subsequent change of teams, with only five of the previous season's twelve teams remaining. Bournemouth are the current champions and are promoted to Regional 1 South Central.

== Format ==
The season runs from September to April and comprises twenty-two rounds of matches, with each club playing each of its rivals home and away. The results of the matches contribute points to the league table as follows:

- 4 points are awarded for a win
- 2 points are awarded for a draw
- 0 points are awarded for a loss, however
- 1 losing (bonus) point is awarded to a team that loses a match by 7 points or fewer
- 1 additional (bonus) point is awarded to a team scoring 4 tries or more in a match

The club finishing in first place is automatically promoted to Regional 1 South Central. Relegated teams drop down to a level seven league.

== 2026–27 ==
=== Participating teams and locations ===
NIne of the teams remain from last season. Departing were the champions Bournemouth, promoted to Regional 1 South Central while Reeds Weybridge (11th) and Ellingham & Ringwood (12th) were relegated to Counties 1 Surrey/Sussex and Counties 1 Hampshire respectively. Incoming teams were Camberley, relegated from Regional 1 South Central, while Bognor, champions of Counties 1 Hampshire and Weybridge Vandals, runner-up of Counties 1 Surrey/Sussex were promoted to Regional 2 South Central.

Team	Ground	Capacity	City/Area	Previous season
Bognor	Hampshire Avenue		Bognor Regis, West Sussex	Promoted from Counties 1 Hampshire (champions)
Camberley	Watchetts Recreation Ground	Camberley, Surrey	Relegated from Regional 1 South Central (12th)	
Chobham	Fowlers Well		Chobham, Surrey	9th
Guildford	Broadwater Sports Club		Farncombe, Surrey	10th
Havant II	Hook's Lane	1,500	Havant, Hampshire	7th
Old Tiffinians	Grist's Memorial Ground		Thames Ditton, Surrey	4th
Petersfield	Penn's Place		Petersfield, Hampshire	5th
Tottonians	Water Lane		Totton, Hampshire	6th
Twickenham	Parkfields		Hampton, London	8th
Weybridge Vandals	Brownacres		Walton-on-Thames, Surrey	Promoted from Counties 1 Surrey/Sussex (2nd)
Wimborne	Leigh Park		Wimborne Minster, Dorset	3rd
Winchester	North Walls Park		Winchester, Hampshire	2nd

Locations of the 2026–27 Regional 2 South Central teams in Greater London
Locations of the 2026–27 Regional 2 South Central teams in Surrey, Hampshire & Dorset

== 2025–26 ==
=== Participating teams and locations ===
Seven teams remained from last season. Departing were Farnham, promoted to Regional 1 South Central while Chichester (11th) and Andover (12th) were relegated to Counties 1 Hampshire. Also leaving were Newbury Blues (8th) and North Dorset (10th) on a level transfer to Regional 2 Severn. Incoming teams were Havant II (1st) and Ellingham & Ringwood (2nd), both promoted from Counties 1 Hampshire and Twickenham (1st) promoted from Counties 1 Surrey/Sussex. Reeds Weybridge (6th) and Old Tiffinians (7th) were both level transferred from Regional 2 South East.

Team	Ground	Capacity	City/Area	Previous season
Bournemouth	Chapel Gate	1,500	Bournemouth, Dorset	2nd
Chobham	Fowlers Well		Chobham, Surrey	7th
Ellingham & Ringwood	Parsonage Barn Lane		Ringwood, Hampshire	Promoted from Counties 1 Hampshire (2nd)
Guildford	Broadwater Sports Club		Farncombe, Surrey	9th
Havant II	Hook's Lane	1,500	Havant, Hampshire	Promoted from Counties 1 Hampshire (champions)
Old Tiffinians	Grist's Memorial Ground		Thames Ditton, Surrey	Level transfer from Regional 2 South East (7th)
Petersfield	Penn's Place		Petersfield, Hampshire	5th
Reeds Weybridge	Whiteley Village		Hersham, Surrey	Level transfer from Regional 2 South East (6th)
Tottonians	Water Lane		Totton, Hampshire	4th
Twickenham	Parkfields		Hampton, London	Promoted from Counties 1 Surrey/Sussex (champions)
Wimborne	Leigh Park		Wimborne Minster, Dorset	6th
Winchester	North Walls Park		Winchester, Hampshire	3rd

Locations of the 2025–26 Regional 2 South Central teams in Greater London, Surrey & Hampshire
Locations of the 2025–26 Regional 2 South Central teams in Dorset

=== League table ===
2025–26 Regional 2 South Central
		Played	Won	Drawn	Lost	Points for	Points against	Points diff	Try bonus	Loss bonus	Points	Pts. adj.
1	Bournemouth (P)	22	21	1	0	888	367	521	15	0	103	
2	Winchester	22	19	0	3	823	361	462	17	2	96	−1
3	Wimborne	22	16	0	6	788	465	323	18	2	84	
4	Old Tiffinians	22	13	1	8	876	555	321	20	5	79	
5	Petersfield	22	12	1	9	566	526	40	13	3	67	+1
6	Tottonians	22	11	1	10	653	497	156	14	7	67	
7	Havant II	22	10	0	12	782	829	−47	17	2	59	
8	Twickenham	22	10	0	12	679	665	14	14	3	57	
9	Chobham	22	7	0	15	536	723	−187	9	2	39	
10	Guildford	22	6	0	16	442	897	−455	9	1	34	
11	Reeds Weybridge (R)	22	4	0	18	384	838	−454	4	4	19	−5
12	Ellingham & Ringwood (R)	22	1	0	21	276	970	−694	6	1	6	−5
Points are awarded as follows: four points for a win; two points for a draw; no points for a loss; one bonus point for scoring four tries or more in a match; one bonus point for losing by seven points or less.; If teams are level at any stage, tiebreakers are applied in the following order: 1. Number of matches won 2. Difference between points for and against 3. Total number of points for 4. Aggregate number of points scored in matches between tied teams 5. Number of matches won excluding the first match, then the second and so on until the tie is settled
Mint background is the promotion place. (1st); Green background are the promotion play-off places. (2nd–5th); Pink background are the relegation play-off places (10th–11th); Salmon background is the relegation place. (12th); Updated: 24 June 2026; Source:

== 2024–25 ==
=== Participating teams and locations ===
Leaving the league were Jersey, promoted to Regional 1 South East together with Reading and Salisbury who were relegated to Counties 1 Southern North and Counties 1 Southern South respectively. Also departing on level transfers were London Irish Amateur (to Regional 2 Thames) and Witney (to Regional 2 Severn).

Joining were North Dorset, promoted from Counties 1 Southern South together with Andover and Petersfield, both promoted from Counties 1 Hampshire. Bournemouth came down from Regional 1 South Central whilst Chobham were added on a level transfer (from Regional 2 Thames).

Team	Ground	Capacity	City/Area	Previous season
Andover	Foxcotte Lane		Andover, Hampshire	Promoted from Counties 1 Hampshire (runners-up)
Bournemouth	Chapel Gate	1,500	Bournemouth, Dorset	Relegated from Regional 1SC (12th)
Chichester	Oaklands Park		Chichester, West Sussex	9th
Chobham	Fowlers Well		Chobham, Surrey	Level transfer from Regional 2 Thames (7th)
Farnham	Wilkinson Way		Farnham, Surrey	7th
Guildford	Broadwater Sports Club		Farncombe, Surrey	4th
Newbury Blues	Monks Lane	8,000	Newbury, Berkshire	10th
North Dorset	Slaughtergate	1,000	Gillingham, Dorset	Promoted from Counties 1 Southern South (champions)
Petersfield	Penn's Place		Petersfield, Hampshire	Promoted from Counties 1 Hampshire (champions)
Tottonians	Water Lane		Totton, Hampshire	3rd
Wimborne	Leigh Park		Wimborne Minster, Dorset	8th
Winchester	North Walls Park		Winchester, Hampshire	2nd

Locations of the 2024–25 Regional 2 South Central teams in Surrey, Berkshire, West Sussex & Hampshire
Locations of the 2024–25 Regional 2 South Central teams in Dorset

=== League table ===
2024–25 Regional 2 South Central
		Played	Won	Drawn	Lost	Points for	Points against	Points diff	Try bonus	Loss bonus	Points
1	Farnham (P)	22	20	2	0	777	340	437	17	0	101
2	Bournemouth	22	19	0	3	870	429	441	14	2	92
3	Winchester	22	17	2	3	844	355	489	15	3	90
4	Tottonians	22	17	1	4	744	449	295	14	1	85
5	Petersfield	22	11	0	11	676	601	75	17	3	64
6	Wimborne	22	10	0	12	640	523	117	13	4	57
7	Chobham	22	7	0	15	539	750	−211	13	5	46
8	Newbury Blues	22	8	0	14	417	657	−240	6	4	42
9	Guildford	22	5	2	15	514	732	−218	11	4	39
10	North Dorset	22	7	0	15	422	808	−386	8	1	37
11	Chichester (R)	22	5	1	16	476	699	−223	8	6	36
12	Andover (R)	22	2	0	20	361	937	−576	4	1	13
Points are awarded as follows: four points for a win; two points for a draw; no points for a loss; one bonus point for scoring four tries or more in a match; one bonus point for losing by seven points or less.; If teams are level at any stage, tiebreakers are applied in the following order: 1. Number of matches won 2. Difference between points for and against 3. Total number of points for 4. Aggregate number of points scored in matches between tied teams 5. Number of matches won excluding the first match, then the second and so on until the tie is settled
Green background is the promotion place. Pink background are relegation places. Updated: 24 August 2025; Source:

== 2023–24 ==
=== Participating teams and locations ===
Regional 2 South Central has been transferred from the South West Division of the RFU to the London & SE Division and only five of the 2022–23 seasons teams remain. The Gloucestershire and Wiltshire teams (with the exception of Salisbury) were transferred to leagues in the South West Division.

Team	Ground	Capacity	City/Area	Previous season
Chichester	Oaklands Park		Chichester, West Sussex	Transferred from Regional 2SE (9th)
Farnham	Wilkinson Way		Farnham, Surrey	Transferred from Regional 2SE (2nd)
Guildford	Broadwater Sports Club		Farncombe, Surrey	Transferred from Regional 2SE (8th)
Jersey	St Peter	4000	St Peter, Jersey	Promoted from Counties 1 Hampshire (1st)
London Irish Wild Geese	Hazelwood	2,000	Sunbury-on-Thames, Surrey	Transferred from Regional 2 Thames (5th)
Newbury Blues	Monks Lane	8,000	Newbury, Berkshire	3rd
Reading	Holme Park		Reading, Berkshire	6th
Salisbury			Salisbury, Wiltshire	7th
Tottonians	Water Lane		Totton, Hampshire	2nd
Wimborne	Leigh Park		Wimborne Minster, Dorset	Promoted from Counties 1 Southern South (1st)
Winchester	North Walls Park		Winchester, Hampshire	Promoted from Counties 1 Hampshire (2nd)
Witney			Witney, Oxfordshire	5th

Locations of the 2023–24 Regional 2 South Central teams in Surrey, Berkshire, West Sussex, Hampshire and the Channel Islands

=== League table ===
2023–24 Regional 2 South Central Table
		Played	Won	Drawn	Lost	Points for	Points against	Points diff	Try bonus	Loss bonus	Points	Points deducted
1	Jersey (P)	22	20	0	2	975	423	552	20	1	102	
2	Winchester	22	16	1	5	653	332	321	16	3	85	
3	Tottonians	22	15	0	7	679	443	236	11	6	77	
4	Guildford	22	13	1	8	672	469	203	15	3	72	
5	London Irish Wild Geese	22	11	1	10	643	616	27	14	6	66	
6	Witney	22	12	0	10	448	446	2	9	5	62	
7	Farnham	22	8	0	14	668	578	90	16	9	57	
8	Wimborne	22	9	1	12	503	668	−165	10	5	53	
9	Chichester	22	8	1	13	489	566	−77	8	5	47	
10	Newbury Blues	22	9	0	13	387	629	−242	5	1	42	
11	Salisbury (R)	22	5	0	17	325	815	−490	3	1	24	
12	Reading (R)	22	3	1	18	312	769	−457	3	3	20	
Points are awarded as follows: four points for a win; two points for a draw; no points for a loss; one bonus point for scoring four tries or more in a match; one bonus point for losing by seven points or less.; If teams are level at any stage, tiebreakers are applied in the following order: 1. Number of matches won 2. Difference between points for and against 3. Total number of points for 4. Aggregate number of points scored in matches between tied teams 5. Number of matches won excluding the first match, then the second and so on until the tie is settled
Green background is the promotion place. Pink background are relegation places. Updated: 29 October 2024; Source:

== 2022–23 ==
=== Participating teams and locations ===
The twelve teams are based in Berkshire, Buckinghamshire, Gloucestershire, Hampshire, Oxfordshire, Warwickshire and Wiltshire. Marlborough won all 22 of their matches and are promoted to Regional 1 South Central, while Grove (11th) and Buckingham (12th), will play in Counties 1 Southern North.

Team	Ground	Capacity	City/Area	Previous season
Buckingham	Floyd Field		Maids Moreton, Buckingham, Buckinghamshire	Relegated from South West 1 East (14th)
Devizes	The Sports Club		Devizes, Wiltshire	Promoted from Southern Counties South (1st)
Grove	Cane Lane		Grove, Oxfordshire	Relegated from South West 1 East (13th)
Marlborough	The Common		Marlborough, Wiltshire	Transferred from South West 1 East (9th)
Newbury Blues	Monks Lane	8,000	Newbury, Berkshire	Transferred from South West 1 East (4th)
Reading	Holme Park		Reading, Berkshire	Promoted from Southern Counties North (2nd)
Salisbury			Salisbury, Wiltshire	Promoted from Southern Counties South (2nd)
Shipston-on-Stour	Mayo Road	600	Shipston-on-Stour, Warwickshire	Promoted from Southern Counties North (4th)
Stow-on-the-Wold	Oddington Road		Stow-on-the-Wold, Gloucestershire	Promoted from Southern Counties North (1st)
Swindon	Greenbridge Road		Swindon, Wiltshire	Promoted from Southern Counties South (3rd)
Tottonians	Water Lane		Totton, Hampshire	Promoted from London 2 South West (1st)
Witney			Witney, Oxfordshire	Transferred from South West 1 East (5th)

Locations of the 2022–23 Regional 2 South Central teams

=== League table ===
2022–23 Regional 2 South Central Table
		Played	Won	Drawn	Lost	Points for	Points against	Points diff	Try bonus	Loss bonus	Points	Points deducted
1	Marlborough (P)	22	22	0	0	1004	184	820	20	0	110	
2	Tottonians	22	17	0	5	820	437	383	14	1	83	
3	Newbury Blues	22	15	0	7	713	403	310	14	3	77	
4	Stow-on-the-Wold	22	15	0	7	643	390	253	13	3	77	
5	Witney	22	14	0	8	664	463	201	12	3	71	
6	Reading	22	9	1	12	515	711	−196	9	3	50	
7	Salisbury	22	9	0	13	495	639	−144	9	5	50	
8	Devizes	22	9	0	13	495	660	−165	9	3	48	
9	Shipston on Stour	22	8	0	14	580	714	−134	10	5	47	
10	Swindon	22	9	0	13	429	567	−138	8	6	45	−5
11	Grove (R)	22	4	0	18	362	924	−562	6	2	19	−5
12	Buckingham (R)	22	0	1	21	344	972	−628	8	6	11	−5
Points are awarded as follows: four points for a win; two points for a draw; no points for a loss; one bonus point for scoring four tries or more in a match; one bonus point for losing by seven points or less.; If teams are level at any stage, tiebreakers are applied in the following order: 1. Number of matches won 2. Difference between points for and against 3. Total number of points for 4. Aggregate number of points scored in matches between tied teams 5. Number of matches won excluding the first match, then the second and so on until the tie is settled
Green background is the promotion place. Pink background are relegation places. Updated: 23 July 2023; Source:

== Regional 2 South Central (2022– ) ==
League restructuring by the RFU created twelve leagues at level six. The champions are promoted to Regional 1 South Central and the bottom sides are relegated to Counties 1 Southern North.

Regional 2 South Central
Season	No of teams	No of matches	Champions	Runners-up	Relegated team(s)	Ref
2022–23	12	22	Marlborough	Tottonians	Grove (11th) and Buckingham (12th)	
2023–24	12	22	Jersey	Winchester	Salisbury (11th) and Reading (12th)	
2024–25	12	22	Farnham	Bournemouth	Chicester (11th) and Andover (12th)	
2025–26	12	22	Bournemouth	Winchester	Reeds Weybridge (11th) and Ellingham & Ringwood (12th)	
Green background is the promotion place.

== See also ==
- English rugby union system
