= Counties 1 Southern South =

League in the Rugby Football Union South West Division

- Current season or competition: 2025–26 Counties 1 Southern South
- Sport: Rugby union
- Instituted: 1987; 39 years ago (as Southern Counties)
- Number of teams: 12
- Country: England
- Holders: Royal Wootton Bassett II (2024–25) (promoted to Regional 2 Severn)
- Most titles: Wimborne (5 titles)

Counties 1 Southern South (formerly known as Southern Counties South) is a level 7 league in the Rugby Football Union South West Division, the rugby union governing body for South West England, part of the Rugby Football Union. When league rugby first began in 1987 it was a single league known as Southern Counties but in 1996 the division was split into two regional leagues: Southern Counties North (now Counties 1 Southern North) and Southern Counties South. Counties 1 Southern South primarily features teams based in Dorset and Wiltshire, with some from Somerset.

The league champions at the end of the season are promoted to Regional 2 South Central or Regional 2 Severn while the last two or three teams are relegated to one of three Counties 2 Dorset & Wilts leagues depending on geographic location. As of the 2022–23 season, with the RFU league restructuring, second XVs are able to play in Counties 1 Southern South.

== Structure and format ==
The twelve teams play home and away matches from September through to April, making a total of twenty-two matches each. The results of the matches contribute points to the league as follows:

- 4 points are awarded for a win.
- 2 points are awarded for a draw.
- 0 points are awarded for a loss.

In addition:

- 1 losing (bonus) point is awarded to a team that loses a match by 7 points or fewer
- 1 additional (bonus) point is awarded to a team scoring 4 tries or more in a match

The league champions are promoted to Regional 2 South Central or Regional 2 Severn while the last two or three teams are relegated to one of three Counties 2 Dorset & Wilts leagues depending on geographic location.

== 2026–27 ==
Departing were Sherborne, promoted to Regional 2 South West while Swindon (11th) and Alfred's Nomads (Marlborough 2nd XV) (12th) were relegated to Counties 2 Dorset & Wilts North.

Team	Ground	Capacity	Town/Area	Previous season
Chippenham II	Allington Fields	500	Chippenham, Wiltshire	10th
Combe Down	Holly's Corner		Combe Down, Bath, Somerset	Promoted from Counties 2 Dorset & Wilts North
Corsham	Lacock Road		Corsham, Wiltshire	8th
Devizes	The Sports Club		Devizes, Wiltshire	3rd
Dorchester	Coburg Road		Dorchester, Dorset	Promoted from Counties 2 Dorset & Wilts South
Frome	Gypsy Lane		Frome, Somerset	4th
Melksham	The Conigre	1,000	Melksham, Wiltshire	7th
North Dorset	Slaughtergate	1,000	Gillingham, Dorset	Relegated from Regional 2 Severn
Salisbury	Castle Road	1,500	Salisbury, Wiltshire	5th
Swanage & Wareham	Bestwall Road		Wareham, Dorset	6th
Trowbridge II	Doric Park		Hilperton, Trowbridge, Wiltshire	9th
Walcot	Albert Field		Lansdown, Bath, Somerset	2nd

Locations of the 2026–27 Southern Counties South teams in Somerset and Wiltshire
Locations of the 2026–27 Southern Counties South teams in Dorset

== 2025–26 ==
=== Participating teams and locations ===
Departing were Royal Wootton Bassett II, promoted to Regional 2 Severn while Combe Down (12th) were relegated to Counties 2 Dorset & Wilts North together with Dorchester (11th), relegated to Counties 2 Dorset & Wilts South.

Team	Ground	Capacity	Town/Area	Previous season
Alfred's Nomads (Marlborough 2nd XV)	The Common		Marlborough, Wiltshire	Promoted from Counties 2 Dorset & Wilts North (champions)
Chippenham II	Allington Fields	500	Chippenham, Wiltshire	10th
Corsham	Lacock Road		Corsham, Wiltshire	8th
Devizes	The Sports Club		Devizes, Wiltshire	2nd
Frome	Gypsy Lane		Frome, Somerset	7th
Melksham	The Conigre	1,000	Melksham, Wiltshire	9th
Salisbury	Castle Road	1,500	Salisbury, Wiltshire	5th
Sherborne	Gainsborough Park		Sherborne, Dorset	3rd
Swanage & Wareham	Bestwall Road		Wareham, Dorset	6th
Swindon	Greenbridge Road		Swindon, Wiltshire	Relegated from Regional 2 Severn (12th)
Trowbridge II	Doric Park		Hilperton, Trowbridge, Wiltshire	Promoted from Counties 2 Dorset & Wilts Central (champions)
Walcot	Albert Field		Lansdown, Bath, Somerset	4th

Locations of the 2025–26 Southern Counties South teams in Somerset and Wiltshire
Locations of the 2025–26 Southern Counties South teams in Dorset

== 2024–25 ==
=== Participating teams and locations ===
Departing were North Dorset, promoted to Regional 2 South Central while Weymouth & Portland (10th) were relegated to Counties 2 Dorset & Wilts South together with Yeovil (11th) and Avondale (12th) both relegated to Counties 2 Dorset & Wilts Central. Incoming teams were Salisbury (11th) and Devizes (12th) relegated from Regional 2 South Central and Regional 2 Severn respectively. Promoted to Counties 1 Southern South were Chippenham II champions of Counties 2 Dorset & Wilts North and Melksham, champions of Counties 2 Dorset & Wilts Central.

Team	Ground	Capacity	Town/Area	Previous season
Combe Down	Holly's Corner		Combe Down, Bath, Somerset	7th
Chippenham II	Allington Fields	500	Chippenham, Wiltshire	Promoted from Counties 2 Dorset & Wilts North (champions)
Corsham	Lacock Road		Corsham, Wiltshire	9th
Devizes	The Sports Club		Devizes, Wiltshire	Relegated from Regional 2 Severn (12th)
Dorchester	Coburg Road		Dorchester, Dorset	8th
Frome	Gypsy Lane		Frome, Somerset	4th
Melksham	The Conigre	1,000	Melksham, Wiltshire	Promoted from Counties 2 Dorset & Wilts Central (champions)
Royal Wootton Bassett II	Ballards Ash	5,000	Royal Wootton Bassett, Wiltshire	6th
Salisbury	Castle Road	1,500	Salisbury, Wiltshire	Relegated from Regional 2 South Central (11th)
Sherborne	Gainsborough Park		Sherborne, Dorset	3rd
Swanage & Wareham	Bestwall Road		Wareham, Dorset	2nd
Walcot	Albert Field		Lansdown, Bath, Somerset	5th

Locations of the 2024–25 Southern Counties South teams in Somerset and Wiltshire
Locations of the 2024–25 Southern Counties South teams in Dorset

=== League table ===
Counties 1 Southern South 2024–25
	Team	Played	Won	Drawn	Lost	Points for	Points against	Points diff	Try bonus	Loss bonus	Points	Points adj
1	Royal Wootton Bassett II (P)	22	20	0	2	861	425	436	19	0	99	
2	Devizes	22	16	2	4	646	482	164	16	3	88	1
3	Sherborne	22	17	2	3	690	389	301	14	1	87	
4	Walcot	22	12	0	10	587	582	5	11	6	65	
5	Salisbury	22	14	0	8	479	469	10	7	1	64	
6	Swanage & Wareham	22	11	1	10	612	489	123	11	2	59	
7	Frome	22	10	0	12	525	553	−28	12	2	54	
8	Corsham	22	7	2	13	553	596	−43	10	5	47	
9	Melksham	22	6	2	14	534	714	−180	9	2	39	
10	Chippenham II	22	4	2	16	472	766	−294	8	4	32	
11	Dorchester (R)	22	3	0	19	465	813	−348	10	5	27	
12	Combe Down (R)	22	6	1	15	439	585	−146	6	3	25	−10
If teams are level at any stage, tiebreakers are applied in the following order: 1. Number of matches won 2. Number of draws 3. Difference between points for and against 4. Total number of points for 5. Aggregate number of points scored in matches between tied teams 6. Number of matches won excluding the first match, then the second and so on until the tie is settled
Green background is the promotion place. Pink background are the relegation places. Updated: 12 March 2026; Source:

== 2023–24 ==
=== Participating teams and locations ===
Wimborne, as champions, was promoted to Regional 2 South Central, while Trowbridge II (10th) and Frome II (12), were both relegated to Counties 2 Dorset & Wilts North and Blandford (11th) was relegated to Counties 2 Dorset & Wilts South. Incoming teams were Frome (11th) and Sherborne (11th) relegated from Regional 2 Severn and Regional 2 South West respectively; while Corsham (1st) promoted from Counties 2 Dorset & Wilts Central and Weymouth & Portland (1st) promoted from Counties 2 Dorset & Wilts South.

Team	Ground	Capacity	Town/Area	Previous season
Avonvale	Bathford Playing Fields		Bathford, Bath, Somerset	9th
Combe Down	Holly's Corner		Combe Down, Bath, Somerset	4th
Corsham	Lacock Road		Corsham, Wiltshire	Promoted from Counties 2 Dorset & Wilts Central (champions)
Dorchester	Coburg Road		Dorchester, Dorset	5th
Frome	Gypsy Lane		Frome, Somerset	Relegated from Regional 2 Severn (11th)
North Dorset	Slaughtergate	1,000	Gillingham, Dorset	8th
Royal Wootton Bassett II	Ballards Ash	5,000	Royal Wootton Bassett, Wiltshire	7th
Sherborne	Gainsborough Park		Sherborne, Dorset	Relegated from Regional 2 South West (11th)
Swanage & Wareham	Bestwall Road		Wareham, Dorset	6th
Walcot	Albert Field		Lansdown, Bath, Somerset	2nd
Weymouth & Portland	Monmouth Avenue		Weymouth, Dorset	Promoted from Counties 2 Dorset & Wilts South (champions)
Yeovil	Yeovil Showground		Yeovil, Somerset	3rd

Locations of the 2023–24 Southern Counties South teams in Somerset and Wiltshire
Locations of the 2023–24 Southern Counties South teams in Somerset and Dorset

=== League table ===
Counties 1 Southern South 2023–24
	Team	Played	Won	Drawn	Lost	Points for	Points against	Points diff	Try bonus	Loss bonus	Points	Points adj
1	North Dorset (P)	22	19	0	3	696	306	390	14	2	92	
2	Swanage & Wareham	22	17	0	5	641	404	237	15	2	85	
3	Sherborne	22	18	0	4	778	343	435	14	2	84	−4
4	Frome	22	15	0	7	530	405	125	10	3	74	1
5	Walcot	22	15	0	7	548	368	180	8	3	67	−4
6	Royal Wootton Bassett II	22	12	2	8	578	388	190	10	4	67	
7	Combe Down	22	9	1	12	483	554	−71	9	5	53	1
8	Dorchester	22	7	1	14	629	560	69	11	5	47	1
9	Corsham	22	8	0	14	305	493	−188	4	2	38	
10	Weymouth & Portland (R)	22	7	0	15	404	566	−162	6	2	31	−5
11	Yeovil (R)	22	1	0	21	293	1036	−743	4	1	9	
12	Avondale (R)	22	2	0	20	249	711	−462	3	3	4	−10
If teams are level at any stage, tiebreakers are applied in the following order: 1. Number of matches won 2. Number of draws 3. Difference between points for and against 4. Total number of points for 5. Aggregate number of points scored in matches between tied teams 6. Number of matches won excluding the first match, then the second and so on until the tie is settled
Green background is the promotion place. Pink background are the relegation places. Updated: 12 March 2026; Source:

== 2022–23 ==
=== Participating teams and locations ===
This was the first season following the RFU Adult Competition Review. Seven of the teams who competed in the final season of Southern Counties South returned.

Team	Ground	Capacity	Town/Area	Previous season
Avonvale	Bathford Playing Fields		Bathford, Bath, Somerset	11th Southern Counties South
Blandford	Larksmead Recreation Ground		Blandford, Dorset	Promoted Dorset & Wilts 1 South (2nd)
Combe Down	Holly's Corner		Combe Down, Bath, Somerset	6th Southern Counties South
Dorchester	Coburg Road		Dorchester, Dorset	8th Southern Counties South
Frome II	Gypsy Lane		Frome, Somerset	Promoted Dorset & Wilts 1 North (champions)
North Dorset	Slaughtergate	1,000	Gillingham, Dorset	Promoted Dorset & Wilts 1 South (champions)
Royal Wootton Bassett II	Ballards Ash	5,000	Royal Wootton Bassett, Wiltshire	Promoted Dorset & Wilts 1 North (3rd)
Swanage & Wareham	Bestwall Road		Wareham, Dorset	5th Southern Counties South
Trowbridge II	Doric Park		Hilperton, Trowbridge, Wiltshire	Promoted Dorset & Wilts 1 North (2nd)
Walcot	Albert Field		Lansdown, Bath, Somerset	9th Southern Counties South
Wimborne	Leigh Park		Wimborne, Dorset	4th Southern Counties South
Yeovil	Yeovil Showground		Yeovil, Somerset	7th Southern Counties South

Locations of the 2022–23 Southern Counties South teams in Somerset and Wiltshire
Locations of the 2022–23 Southern Counties South teams in Somerset and Dorset

=== League table ===
Counties 1 Southern South 2022–23
	Team	Played	Won	Drawn	Lost	Points for	Points against	Points diff	Try bonus	Loss bonus	Points	Points adj
1	Wimborne (P)	22	20	2	0	943	263	680	18	0	104	2
2	Walcot	22	18	0	4	775	297	478	14	1	88	1
3	Yeovil	22	14	1	7	578	474	104	13	1	72	
4	Combe Down	22	14	1	7	589	363	226	12	0	70	
5	Dorchester	22	12	0	10	548	446	102	12	3	66	3
6	Swanage & Wareham	22	11	1	10	556	416	140	9	5	63	3
7	Royal Wootton Bassett II	22	11	0	11	691	509	182	14	4	62	
8	North Dorset	22	11	1	10	595	523	72	10	4	60	
9	Avondale	22	8	0	14	414	482	−68	8	3	33	−10
10	Trowbridge II (R)	22	4	0	18	412	1068	−656	6	1	18	−5
11	Blandford (R)	22	4	0	18	279	704	−425	4	3	13	−10
12	Frome II (R)	22	2	0	20	144	979	−835	1	1	1	−9
If teams are level at any stage, tiebreakers are applied in the following order: 1. Number of matches won 2. Number of draws 3. Difference between points for and against 4. Total number of points for 5. Aggregate number of points scored in matches between tied teams 6. Number of matches won excluding the first match, then the second and so on until the tie is settled
Green background is the promotion place. Pink background are the relegation places. Updated: 11 March 2026; Source:

== 2021–22 ==
=== Participating teams and locations ===
Thatcham finished 11th in 2019–20 but were level transferred to Southern Counties North for the current season.

Team	Ground	Capacity	Town/Area	Previous season
Avonvale	Bathford Playing Fields		Bathford, Bath, Somerset	Promoted from Dorset & Wilts 1 North (champions)
Combe Down	Holly's Corner		Combe Down, Bath, Somerset	6th
Corsham	Lacock Road		Corsham, Wiltshire	10th
Devizes	The Sports Club		Devizes, Wiltshire	4th
Dorchester	Coburg Road		Dorchester, Dorset	Promoted from Dorset & Wilts 1 South (champions)
Salisbury	Castle Road	1,500	Salisbury, Wiltshire	Relegated from South West 1 East (14th)
Swindon	Greenbridge Road		Swindon, Wiltshire	3rd
Swindon College Old Boys	Nationwide Sports Pavilion		Swindon, Wiltshire	8th
Swanage & Wareham	Bestwall Road		Wareham, Dorset	5th
Walcot	Albert Field		Lansdown, Bath, Somerset	9th
Wimborne	Leigh Park		Wimborne, Dorset	Relegated from South West 1 East (13th)
Yeovil	Yeovil Showground		Yeovil, Somerset	7th

Locations of the 2021–22 Southern Counties South teams in Avon and Wiltshire
Locations of the 2021–22 Southern Counties South teams in Somerset and Dorset

== 2020–21 ==
Due to the coronavirus pandemic the season was cancelled.

== 2019–20 ==
=== Participating teams and locations ===
Team	Ground	Capacity	Town/Area	Previous season
Combe Down	Holly's Corner		Combe Down, Bath, Somerset	Promoted from Dorset & Wilts 1 North (champions)
Corsham	Lacock Road		Corsham, Wiltshire	9th
Devizes	The Sports Club		Devizes, Wiltshire	8th
Frome	Gypsy Lane		Frome, Somerset	Runner-up (lost play-off)
Grove	Cane Lane		Grove, Oxfordshire	4th
North Dorset	Slaughtergate	1,000	Gillingham, Dorset	7th
Swindon	Greenbridge Road		Swindon, Wiltshire	Relegated from South West 1 East (13th)
Swindon College Old Boys	Nationwide Sports Pavilion		Swindon, Wiltshire	6th
Thatcham	Henwicky Worthy Sports Field		Thatcham, Berkshire	10th
Swanage & Wareham	Bestwall Road		Wareham, Dorset	Promoted from Dorset & Wilts 1 South (champions)
Walcot	Albert Field		Lansdown, Bath, Somerset	5th
Yeovil	Yeovil Showground		Yeovil, Somerset	3rd

Locations of the 2019–20 Southern Counties South teams

== 2018–19 ==
=== Participating teams and locations ===
Team	Ground	Capacity	Town/Area	Previous season
Bradford-on-Avon	Broom Ground		Winsley, Bradford-on-Avon, Wiltshire	Promoted from Dorset & Wilts 1 North (champions)
Corsham	Lacock Road		Corsham, Wiltshire	4th
Devizes	The Sports Club		Devizes, Wiltshire	8th
Dorchester	Coburg Road		Dorchester, Dorset	Promoted from Dorset & Wilts 1 South (champions)
Frome	Gypsy Lane		Frome, Somerset	6th
Grove	Cane Lane		Grove, Oxfordshire	Relegated from South West 1 East (13th)
North Dorset	Slaughtergate	1,000	Gillingham, Dorset	5th
Sherborne	Gainsborough Park		Sherborne, Dorset	3rd
Swindon College Old Boys	Nationwide Sports Pavilion		Swindon, Wiltshire	9th
Thatcham	Henwicky Worthy Sports Field		Thatcham, Berkshire	Level transfer from Southern Counties North (5th)
Walcot	Albert Field		Lansdown, Bath, Somerset	10th
Yeovil	Yeovil Showground		Yeovil, Somerset	7th

Locations of the 2018–19 Southern Counties South teams

== 2017–18 ==
=== Participating teams and locations ===
Team	Ground	Capacity	Town/Area	Previous season
Blandford	Larksmead Recreation Ground		Blandford, Dorset	10th
Corsham	Lacock Road		Corsham, Wiltshire	Promoted from Dorset & Wilts 1 North (champions)
Devizes	The Sports Club		Devizes, Wiltshire	6th
Frome	Gypsy Lane		Frome, Somerset	8th
Marlborough	The Common		Marlborough, Wiltshire	5th
North Dorset	Slaughtergate	1,000	Gillingham, Dorset	7th
Sherborne	Gainsborough Park		Sherborne, Dorset	3rd
Swanage & Wareham	Bestwall Road		Wareham, Dorset	4th
Swindon College Old Boys	Nationwide Sports Pavilion		Swindon, Wiltshire	Promoted from Berks/Bucks & Oxon Premier (champions)
Trowbridge	Doric Park		Hilperton, Trowbridge, Wiltshire	2nd (lost play-off)
Walcot	Albert Field		Lansdown, Bath, Somerset	9th
Yeovil	Yeovil Showground		Yeovil, Somerset	Promoted from Dorset & Wilts 1 South (Champions)

Locations of the 2017–18 Southern Counties South teams in Wiltshire and Avon
Locations of the 2017–18 Southern Counties South teams in Dorset & Somerset

== 2016–17 ==
=== Participating teams and locations ===
Team	Ground	Capacity	City/Area	Previous season
Blandford	Larksmead Recreation Ground		Blandford, Dorset	Promoted from Dorset & Wilts 1 South (2nd)
Combe Down	Holly's Corner		Combe Down, Bath, Somerset	Promoted from Dorset & Wilts 1 North (champions)
Devizes	The Sports Club		Devizes, Wiltshire	4th
Dorset Dockers	Potterne Park		Verwood, Dorset	7th
Frome	Gypsy Lane		Frome, Somerset	10th
Marlborough	The Common		Marlborough, Wiltshire	6th
North Dorset	Slaughtergate	1,000	Gillingham, Dorset	3rd
Sherborne	Gainsborough Park		Sherborne, Dorset	5th
Swanage & Wareham	Bestwall Road		Wareham, Dorset	Relegated from South West 1 East (14th)
Trowbridge	Doric Park		Hilperton, Trowbridge, Wiltshire	Relegated from South West 1 East (13th)
Walcot	Albert Field		Lansdown, Bath, Somerset	8th
Wimborne	Leigh Park		Wimborne, Dorset	9th

Locations of the 2016–17 Southern Counties South teams in Wiltshire and Somerset
Locations of the 2016–17 Southern Counties South teams in Dorset

== Season 2015–16 ==
The 2015–16 Southern Counties South consists of twelve teams; four each from Dorset, Somerset and Wiltshire. The season started on 12 September 2015 and ended on 23 April 2016.

=== Participating teams and locations ===
Eight of the twelve teams participated in last season's competition. The 2014–15 champions Swanage & Wareham and runner-up Salisbury (who won their play-off game) were promoted to the South West 1 East while Supermarine and Corsham were both relegated to Dorset & Wilts 1 North. Royal Wootton Bassett were level transferred from Southern Counties North.

Team	Ground	Capacity	Town/Village	Previous season
Bradford-on-Avon	Broom Ground		Winsley, Bradford-on-Avon, Wiltshire	10th
Devizes	The Sports Club		Devizes, Wiltshire	Relegated from South West 1 East (12th)
Dorchester	Coburg Road		Dorchester, Dorset	9th
Dorset Dockers	Potterne Park		Verwood, Dorset	Promoted from Dorset & Wilts 1 South (champions)
Frome	Gypsy Lane		Frome, Somerset	6th
Marlborough	The Common		Marlborough, Wiltshire	Promoted from Dorset & Wilts 1 North (champions)
Midsomer Norton	Norton Down Playing Fields		Midsomer Norton, Somerset	7th
North Dorset	Slaughtergate	1,000	Gillingham, Dorset	4th
Royal Wootton Bassett	Ballard's Ash Sports Ground	5,000	Wootton Bassett, Wiltshire	Transferred from Southern Counties North (3rd)
Sherborne	Gainsborough Park		Sherborne, Dorset	3rd
Walcot	Albert Field		Lansdown, Bath, Somerset	5th
Wimborne	Leigh Park		Wimborne, Dorset	8th

Locations of the 2015–16 Southern Counties South teams in Wiltshire and Somerset
Locations of the 2015–16 Southern Counties South teams in Dorset

=== 2015–16 ===
	Team	Played	Won	Drawn	Lost	Points for	Points against	+/−	Try bonus points	Losing bonus points	Points
1	Royal Wootton Bassett	22	19	0	3	640	223	417	13	3	92
2	Midsomer Norton	22	16	1	5	643	297	346	14	3	83
3	North Dorset	22	15	1	6	712	365	347	13	5	80
4	Devizes	22	14	0	8	462	322	140	10	4	71
5	Sherborne	22	14	1	7	619	392	227	9	3	70
6	Marlborough	22	14	0	8	491	391	100	7	5	68
7	Dorset Dockers	22	10	1	11	506	555	−49	9	2	54
8	Walcot	22	7	1	14	467	561	−94	6	2	38
9	Wimborne	22	6	2	14	406	577	−171	7	3	38
10	Frome	22	7	0	15	324	664	−340	4	4	31
11	Bradford-on-Avon	22	3	1	18	255	691	−436	3	3	20
12	Dorchester	22	3	0	19	284	771	−487	4	0	11

== Teams 2014–15 ==
- Bradford-on-Avon
- Corsham
- Dorchester
- Frome
- Midsomer Norton
- North Dorset
- Salisbury (relegated from South West 1 East)
- Sherborne
- Supermarine
- Swanage & Wareham
- Walcot
- Wimborne

== Teams 2013–14 ==
- Corsham
- Dorchester
- Frome
- Ivel Barbarians
- North Dorset (relegated from Tribute South West 1 West)
- Sherborne
- Swanage & Wareham
- Trowbridge
- Walcot
- Wells
- Wimborne

== Teams 2012–13 ==
- Corsham
- Devizes
- Dorchester
- Frome
- Oakmeadians
- Sherborne
- Supermarine
- Trowbridge
- Walcott
- Weymouth
- Wimborne
- Wootton Bassett

== Teams 2009–10 ==
- Bradford-on-Avon
- Corsham
- Devizes
- Dorchester
- Frome
- Ivel Barbarians
- Minety
- North Dorset
- Oldfield Old Boys
- Sherborne
- Tadley
- Wimborne

== Original teams ==
When league rugby began in 1987 this division was known as Southern Counties and contained the following teams:

- Aylesbury
- Banbury
- Bletchley
- Bracknell
- Marlow
- Oxford Marathon (Note: Oxford Marathon would merge with Oxford Old Boys in 1996 to form Oxford Harlequins.)
- Oxford Old Boys (Note: Oxford Old Boys would merge with Oxford Marathon in 1996 to form Oxford Harlequins.)
- Redingensians (Note: Redingensians are currently known as Rams.)
- Swindon
- Wimborne
- Windsor

== Southern Counties South honours ==
=== Southern Counties (1987–1993) ===
Originally Southern Counties North and Southern Counties South were combined in a single division called Southern Counties. It was a tier 7 league with promotion to South West 2 (Note: South West 2 is currently two regional divisions: South West 1 East and South West 1 West.) and relegation to either Berks/Dorset/Wilts 1 (Note: Berks/Dorset/Wilts 1 no longer contains Berkshire clubs and is currently split into Dorset & Wilts 1 North and Dorset & Wilts 1 South.) or Bucks/Oxon 1. (Note: Bucks/Oxon 1 has since involved Berkshire clubs and is currently known as Berks/Bucks & Oxon Premier)

Southern Counties
Season	No of teams	Champions	Runners-up	Relegated teams	Ref
1987–88	11	Redingensians	Swindon	Bracknell	
1988–89	11	Banbury	Aylesbury	Oxford Marathon	
1989–90	11	Marlow	Swanage & Wareham	Oxford Old Boys	
1990–91	11	Sherborne	Windsor	Swindon, Chiltern, Slough, Bracknell	
1991–92	11	Banbury	Aylesbury (Note: 3rd place Windsor also promoted.)	No relegation (Note: No relegation due to league expansion from 11 to 13 teams for the 1992–93 season.)	
1992–93	13	Swanage & Wareham	Dorchester	Grove	
Green backgrounds are promotion places.

=== Southern Counties (1993–1996) ===
At the end of the 1992–93 season the top six teams from London Division 1 and the top six from South West Division 1 were combined to create National 5 South. This meant that Southern Counties dropped from a tier 7 league to a tier 8 league for the years that National 5 South was active. Promotion continued to South West 2 and relegation to either Berks/Dorset/Wilts 1 or Bucks/Oxon 1.

Southern Counties
Season	No of teams	Champions	Runners-up	Relegated teams	Ref
1993–94	13	Bournemouth	Bracknell	Royal Wootton Bassett, Redingensians	
1994–95	13	Dorchester	Bracknell	Slough, Oxford Marathon	
1995–96	13	Amersham & Chiltern	Bracknell (Note: Due to the cancellation of Courage League Division 5 and subsequent restructuring of the leagues at the end of the 1995–96 season, six clubs were promoted from Southern Counties including Chinnor, Chippenham, Marlow and Swindon.)	No relegation (Note: The cancellation of Courage League Division 5 and splitting of Southern Counties into Southern Counties North and Southern Counties South at the end of the 1995–96 season, meant that there was no relegation.)	
Green backgrounds are promotion places.

=== Southern Counties South (1996–2000) ===
Restructuring by the RFU at the end of the 1995–96 season saw Southern Counties split into two separate leagues, Southern Counties North and Southern Counties South, which reverted to tier 7 leagues due to the cancellation of National 5 South. Promotion from Southern Counties South was now to the new South West 2 East (Note: Another change at the end of the 1995–96 saw South West 2 also split into two regional divisions: South West 2 East and South West 2 West.) while relegation was now only to Berks/Dorset/Wilts 1 (currently split into Dorset & Wilts 1 North and Dorset & Wilts 2 South). (Note: Relegated Southern Counties North clubs dropped to Bucks/Oxon 1.)

Southern Counties South
Season	No of teams	Champions	Runners-up	Relegated teams	Ref
1996–97	10	Reading Abbey	Wimborne	Redingensians, Corsham	
1997–98	10	Wimborne	Chippenham	Westbury, Weymouth	
1998–99	10	Chippenham	Royal Wootton Bassett	Blandford, North Dorset, Swindon	
1999–00	10	Tadley	Windsor	Sherborne	
Green backgrounds are promotion places.

=== Southern Counties South (2000–2004) ===
Southern Counties South remained a tier 7 league, with promotion continuing to South West 2 East. However, the transfer of Berkshire clubs from the Dorset/Wilts leagues to the Bucks/Oxon leagues, meant that relegation was now to Dorset & Wilts 1 (formerly Berks/Dorset/Wilts 1). (Note: Dorset & Wilts 1 is now split into two regional divisions: Dorset & Wilts 1 North and Dorset & Wilts South.)

Southern Counties South
Season	No of teams	Champions	Runners-up	Relegated teams	Ref
2000–01	9	Redingensians	Salisbury	No relegation	
2001–02	10	Wimborne	Oakmeadians	Melksham, Corsham, Swindon College Old Boys	
2002–03	10	Frome	Oakmeadians	Calne	
2003–04	9	Ivel Barbarians	Tadley	Westbury	
Green backgrounds are promotion places.

=== Southern Counties South (2005–2009) ===
Southern Counties South remained a tier 7 league, with promotion continuing to South West 2 East, while a further restructuring of the Dorset/Wilts leagues meant that relegation was now to either Dorset & Wilts 1 North or Dorset & Wilts 1 South.

Southern Counties South
Season	No of teams	Champions	Runners-up	Relegated teams	Ref
2004–05	12	Bournemouth	Frome	Minety, Bradford-on-Avon	
2005–06	12	Frome	Oldfield Old Boys	Blandford, Corsham	
2006–07	12	Walcot	Royal Wootton Bassett	Melksham, Bridport	
2007–08	12	Trowbridge	Royal Wootton Bassett	Devizes, Dorchester	
2008–09	12	Oakmeadians	Royal Wootton Bassett	No relegation	
Green backgrounds are promotion places.

=== Southern Counties North (2009–present) ===
Despite widespread league restructuring by the RFU, Southern Counties South continued as a tier 7 league, with promotion to South West 1 East (formerly South West 2 East) and relegation to either Dorset & Wilts 1 North or Dorset & Wilts 1 South.

Southern Counties South
Season	No of teams	Champions	Runners-up	Relegated teams	Ref
2009–10	12	Wimborne	Frome	Ivel Barbarians, Minety	
2010–11	12	Salisbury	Oldfield Old Boys	Bradford-on-Avon, Bridport, Marlborough	
2011–12	12	North Dorset	Dorchester	Melksham, Blandford	
2012–13	12	Devizes	Trowbridge	Supermarine, Oakmeadians	
2013–14	12	Wells	Trowbridge	Ivel Barbarians	
2014–15	12	Swanage & Wareham	Salisbury	Supermarine, Corsham	
2015–16	12	Royal Wootton Bassett	Midsomer Norton	Dorchester, Bradford-on-Avon	
2016–17	12	Wimborne	Trowbridge	Dorset Dockers, Combe Down	
2017–18	12	Trowbridge	Marlborough	Blandford, Swanage & Wareham	
2018–19	12	Sherborne	Frome	Bradford-on-Avon, Dorchester	
2019–20	12	Grove	Frome	North Dorset	
2020–21	12	Season cancelled due to COVID-19 pandemic in the United Kingdom.			
2021–22	12	Devizes	Salisbury	Corsham (12th)	
Green backgrounds are promotion places.

=== Counties 1 Southern South (2022– ) ===
Following the reorganisation of the leagues, Southern Counties South was renamed Counties 1 Southern South and remained a level seven league. The champions are promoted to Regional 2 Severn or Regional 2 South Central and two or three teams are relegated, depending on location, to Counties 2 Dorset & Wilts Central, Counties 2 Dorset & Wilts North or Counties 2 Dorset & Wilts South.

Counties 1 Southern South
Season	No of teams	No of matches	Champions	Runners-up	Relegated team(s)	Ref
2022–23	12	22	Wimborne	Walcot	Trowbridge II (10th), Blandford (11th) and Frome II (12th)	
2023–24	12	22	North Dorset	Swanage & Wareham	Weymouth & Portland (10th), Yeovil (11th) and Avondale (12th)	
2024–25	12	22	Royal Wootton Bassett	Devizes	Dorchester (11th) and Combe Down (12th)	
Green background is the promotion place.

== Promotion play-offs ==
From 2000–01 season to 2018–19 there was a play-off between the runners-up of Southern Counties North and Southern Counties South for the third and final promotion place to South West 1 East. The team with the superior league record had home advantage in the tie. At the end of the 2018–19 season Southern Counties North teams have been the most successful with twelve wins to the Southern Counties South teams seven; and the home team won promotion on thirteen occasions compared to the away teams six.

Southern Counties North v Southern Counties South promotion play-off results
Season	Home team	Score	Away team	Venue	Attendance
2000–01	Salisbury (S)	49–20	Grove (N)	Castle Road, Salisbury, Wiltshire	
2001–02	Grove (N)	30–13	Oakmeadians (S)	Recreation Lane, Grove, Oxfordshire	
2002–03	Oakmeadians (S)	24–17	Aylesbury (N)	Meryick Park, Bournemouth, Dorset	
2003–04	Amersham & Chiltern (N) (Note: The result of the 2003–04 playoff between Amersham & Chiltern and Tadley is unknown due to all the south-west promotion playoff games from this season missing from the RFU website. However, as Amersham & Chiltern were in the higher division the next season (and Tadley were not) it is assumed they won the playoff game. Amersham & Chiltern would also have hosted the game as they had a better points record in their league than Tadley did in theirs.)		Tadley (S)	Ash Grove, Amersham, Buckinghamshire	
2004–05	Frome (S)	12–38	Henley Wanderers (N)	Gypsy Lane, Frome, Somerset	
2005–06	Oldfield Old Boys (S)	32–33	Swindon (N)	Shaft Road, Monkton Combe, Somerset	
2006–07	Wootton Bassett (S)	17–20	Tadley (N)	Ballards Ash Sports Ground, Wootton Bassett, Wiltshire	
2007–08	Wallingford (N)	22–3	Wootton Bassett (S)	Wallingford Sports Park, Wallingford, Oxfordshire	
2008–09	Marlow (N)	18–15	Wootton Bassett (S)	Riverwoods Drive, Marlow, Buckinghamshire	
2009–10	Amersham & Chiltern (N)	45–12	Frome (S)	Ash Grove, Amersham, Buckinghamshire	
2010–11	Aylesbury (N)	10–39	Oldfield Old Boys (S)	Ostler's Field, Weston Turville, Aylesbury, Buckinghamshire	
2011–12	Windsor (N)	22–15	Dorcester (S)	Home Park, Windsor, Berkshire	
2012–13	Grove (N)	39–20	Trowbridge (S)	Recreation Lane, Grove, Oxfordshire	
2013–14	Trowbridge (S)	27–19	Aylesbury (N)	Doric Park, Hilperton, Trowbridge, Wiltshire	
2014–15	Salisbury (S)	34–16	Aylesbury (N)	Castle Road, Salisbury, Wiltshire	
2015–16	Midsomer Norton (S)	29–22	Aylesbury (N)	Norton Down Playing Fields, Midsomer Norton, Somerset	
2016–17	Bicester (N)	53–20	Trowbridge (S)	Oxford Road, Bicester, Oxfordshire	
2017–18	Windsor (N)	29–31	Marlborough (S)	Home Park, Windsor, Berkshire	
2018–19	Frome (S)	10–23	Buckingham (N)	Gypsy Lane, Frome, Somerset	400
2019–20	Cancelled due to COVID-19 pandemic in the United Kingdom. Best ranked runner up – Frome (S) – promoted instead.				
Green background is the promoted team. N = Southern Counties North and S = Southern Counties South

== Number of league titles ==
- Wimborne (5) – 1998, 2002, 2010, 2017, 2023
- Banbury (2) (Note: Both of Banbury's titles were won when league was a single division known as Southern Counties.) – 1989, 1992
- Redingensians (2) (Note: One of Redingensians titles was won when league was a single division known as Southern Counties.) –1988, 2001
- Bournemouth (2) (Note: One of Bournemouth's titles was won when league was a single division known as Southern Counties.) – 1994, 2005
- Frome (2) – 2003, 2006
- Swanage & Wareham (2) (Note: One of Swanage & Wareham's titles was won when league was a single division known as Southern Counties.) – 1993, 2015
- Trowbridge (2) – 2008, 2018
- Sherborne (2) (Note: One of Sherborne's titles was won when league was a single division known as Southern Counties.) – 1991, 2019
- Devizes](2) –2013, 2022
- North Dorset (2) – 2012, 2024
- Royal Wootton Bassett (2) – 2016, 2025
- Marlow (1) (Note: Marlow's title was won when league was a single division known as Southern Counties.) – 1990
- Chippenham (1) – 1993
- Dorchester (1) (Note: Dorchester's title was won when league was a single division known as Southern Counties.) – 1995
- Amersham & Chiltern (1) (Note: Amersham & Chiltern's title was won when league was a single division known as Southern Counties.) – 1996
- Reading Abbey (1) – 1997
- Tadley (1) – 2000
- Ivel Barbarians (1) (Note: Ivel Barbarians are now known as Yeovil Rugby Club.) – 2004
- Walcot (1) – 2007
- Oakmeadians (1) – 2009
- Salisbury (1) – 2011
- Wells (1) – 2014
- Grove (1) – 2020
- Updated to 2024–25 – year(s) won.

== See also ==
- South West Division RFU
- Dorset & Wilts RFU
- English rugby union system
- Rugby union in England
