= North Dorset RFC =

English rugby union club, based in Gillingham, Dorset

- Full name: North Dorset Rugby Football Club
- Union: Dorset & Wilts RFU
- Founded: 1951; 75 years ago
- Location: Gillingham, Dorset, England
- Ground: Slaughtergate (Capacity: 1,000)
- Chairman: Janet Dimmack
- President: Jez Spicer
- Coach: Dean Lloyd-Christie
- Captain: Thomas Stewart
- League: Regional 2 South Central
- 2024–25: 10th (transferred to Regional 2 Severn)
1st kit	2nd kit

Official website
- www.ndrfc.co.uk

North Dorset RFC is a rugby union club in Gillingham, Dorset, who have been in existence since 1951. They currently play in Regional 2 Severn and are based at Slaughtergate, Gillingham. The club runs two senior men's teams, a women's team and a veteran's side, the junior section starts at Under 7's up to a Colts XV.

== Dorset and Wilts Cup ==
North Dorset won the Dorset & Wilts cup once in their history in 2015–16 season beating Marlborough 17 – 16 at Salisbury

== Dorset and Wilts Vase ==
North Dorset have won the Vase four times since 2002.

2002–03 season beating Westbury in the final.

2004–05 season beating Swindon 27–25 in the final.

2008–09 season beating Devizes 24–7 in the final.

2009–10 season beating Corsham 31–16 in the final.

They were runners up in the 2006–07 & 2011–12 seasons, losing both times to Royal Wootton Bassett RFC

In 2010–11 the club again reached the final, but the game was never played due to Wootton Bassett RFC not wanting to play the game due to their aim to finish 2nd and qualify for the promotion play-off; they finished 3rd.

== Off the field ==
The club have had some remarkable success being awarded or winning:

2006 RFU Seal of Approval.

2008 Best Cutting Edge School Club link by a School/Club.

2009 Rugby Football Union President's XV award., Mini and Youth Seal of Approval Club of the Year .

They were also runners up Mini and Youth Seal of Approval Club of the Year in 2007 and 2008.

== Honours ==
1st team:

- Dorset & Wilts 2 South champions (2): 1988–89, (Note: League known as Berks/Dorset/Wilts 2 in 1988–89.) 2002–03
- Dorset & Wilts Vase champions (4): 2003, 2005, 2009, 2010
- Counties 1 Southern South champions (2): 2011–12 (Note: League known as Southern Counties South in 2011–12), 2023–24
- Southern Counties Cup champions: 2015–16
- Dorset & Wilts Cup champions: 2015–16
- Dorset & Wilts 1 South champions: 2021–22

2nd team:

- Dorset & Wilts 2nd XV Cup champions: 2012–13

3rd team:

- Dorset & Wilts 3 South champions (2): 2005–06, 2017–18

Touring Team:

- Ghent 15s rugby festival champions: 2009.
