= Hilperton =

Village in Wiltshire, England

Coordinates: 51.330°N 2.184°W

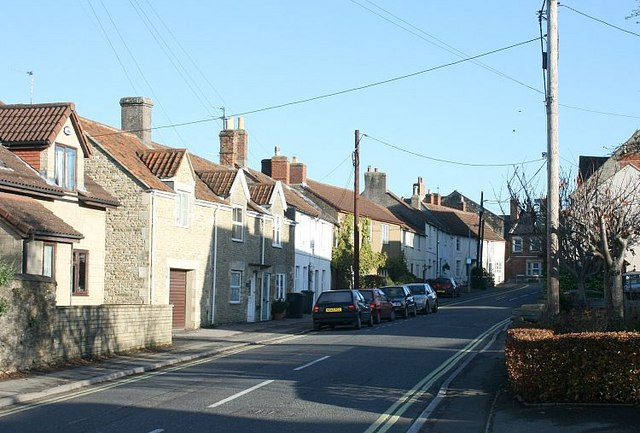
- Church Street, Hilperton

- Location within Wiltshire
- Population: 4,967 (in 2011)
- OS grid reference: ST873590
- Civil parish: Hilperton
- Unitary authority: Wiltshire
- Ceremonial county: Wiltshire
- Region: South West
- Country: England
- Sovereign state: United Kingdom
- Post town: Trowbridge
- Postcode district: BA14
- Dialling code: 01225
- Police: Wiltshire
- Fire: Dorset and Wiltshire
- Ambulance: South Western
- UK Parliament: South West Wiltshire
- Website: Parish Council

Hilperton is a village and civil parish in Wiltshire, England. The village is separated by a few fields (the Hilperton Gap) from the northeastern edge of the town of Trowbridge and is approximately 1.3 miles (2.1 km) from Trowbridge town centre.

To the east of the village are the Devizes Road and Stourton Park housing areas, and Paxcroft, a small industrial hamlet. In the west of the parish is the village of Hilperton Marsh which is adjacent to the village of Staverton (a separate parish) and the Canal Road industrial estate (part of Trowbridge). In the north, beyond the Kennet and Avon Canal, is the rural hamlet of Whaddon.

The Bristol Avon forms part of the parish's northern boundary. The Paxcroft Brook, a tributary of the River Biss, crosses the south of the parish.

== History ==
Settlements with altogether 12 households were recorded at Helprintone or Helperitone in the Domesday Book of 1086. Little is known of Hilperton's history until the 19th century; home-based cloth weaving was a major source of employment but declined during that century.

From the 16th century the Long family were landowners at Hilperton and Whaddon. Hilperton House dates from the 18th century and is Grade II* listed.

A school with 100 places was built near the church c. 1840 and replaced with a larger building in 1875, which by 1893 was attended by 122 children on average. All ages attended until 1931, when it was reorganised into an infant school and junior school; it became voluntary controlled in 1948. Responding to the increase in population, a new school was opened in 1970 a short distance to the north, and was attended by 151 in 2004.

The ancient parish of Whaddon was merged with Semington in 1894, then transferred to Hilperton in the late 20th century.

The population of the parish was 748 in the 1801 census and little changed at 825 in 1951, but by 1971 had more than doubled to 1,928 and by 2011 had again increased to 4,967.

A 2016 community governance review extended the Trowbridge boundary north-east into Hilperton, effective April 2017. The area transferred to Trowbridge, lying south of Hilperton Drive, has around 260 houses, The Mead primary school, and a local shopping centre with a Budgens supermarket and the Red Admiral pub.

== Religious sites ==
=== Church of England ===
The ecclesiastical parishes of Hilperton and Whaddon were combined in 1854.

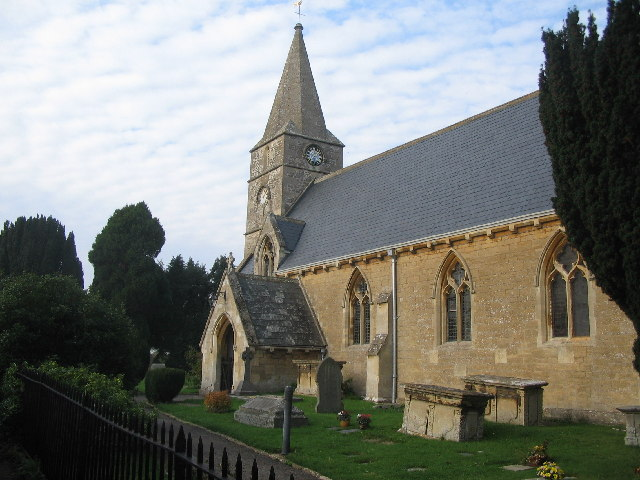
Church of St Michael and All Saints

The parish church of St Michael and All Angels was largely rebuilt by T.H. Wyatt in 1852, as the previous 15th-century church had insufficient capacity. Internal changes were made in the 1890s, including relocation of the organ to an enlarged vestry, the addition of stained glass windows, and the installation of the 12th-century font bowl from the church at Whaddon, mounted on a 19th-century shaft and base. Five of the six bells were recast in 1909.

St Mary's church at Hilperton Marsh was built as a chapel of ease in 1889, using prefabricated corrugated iron components. After further funds were raised, a chancel in stone and flint was added in 1899; the church also gained the 19th-century font from St Michael's. Services were influenced by the Anglo-Catholic Oxford Movement. Changes in 1954 created the parish of Staverton with Hilperton Marsh, where St Mary's became the sole church on the closure of the older St Paul's church at Staverton in 2011.

Whaddon's Church of St Mary is from the 12th and 14th centuries; a chapel for the Long family (later of Rood Ashton House) was added in 1770, and the chancel and bellcote were rebuilt in 1879. 12th-century stones survive, although rearranged, in the north (blocked) and south doorways. The church was designated as Grade II* listed in 1988.

Today the two Hilperton churches, together with those at Whaddon and Semington, comprise the Canalside Benefice.

=== Nonconformists ===
A Particular Baptist chapel, an offshoot of the Back Street chapel at Trowbridge, was built in Hilperton village in 1806 and enlarged in 1821. The congregation numbered 59 in 1829 and 30 in 1890; the chapel continued in use until the second half of the 20th century, and has been replaced by dwellings. A Wesleyan Methodist chapel was built in the village in 1819, then rebuilt in 1891 with seating for 300. The chapel closed before the 1990s and is now a private house. Grace Reformed Baptist Church has met at Hilperton C of E Primary School since March 2015.

== Governance ==
Hilperton is an ancient civil parish with its own elected parish council. It is in the area of Wiltshire Council unitary authority, which is responsible for all significant local government functions. Hilperton electoral division has the same boundaries as the parish, and elects one member of Wiltshire Council; it has been represented by Ernie Clark (Independent) since 9 May 2005.

For Westminster elections, Hilperton is part of the South West Wiltshire constituency, which has been held since 2010 by Andrew Murrison for the Conservatives. Boundary changes which came into effect at the 2024 general election transferred the parish out of the Chippenham constituency to join Trowbridge in South Wiltshire.

== Amenities ==
Hilperton village has a free house pub, the Lion and Fiddle, on Devizes Road. The post office and general stores closed in 2004, though a petrol station (with a small shop) remains in place. The village hall on Whaddon Lane is the social hub of the older part of Hilperton, and the adjoining football pitch is home to Hilperton United FC. Trowbridge Rugby Football Club, who play in Southern Counties South, have their ground at Paxcroft.

The Kennet and Avon Canal crosses the rural northern section of the parish and forms the western boundary of Hilperton Marsh, where there is a marina.

The village school continues as Hilperton CE Primary School. The south of the parish is served by The Mead Community Primary School at Paxcroft Mead, which was in Hilperton parish when it opened in 2001 but is within the area transferred to Trowbridge in 2017. Castle Mead School, another primary school in Trowbridge parish, is nearby.

== Landmarks ==
Hilperton is home to a mid-18th century limestone village lock-up known as The Blind House, a set of stocks, a green village pump manufactured by Lee Howl, a milestone giving directions to three nearby towns, and two elaborate Paxcroft Mead signs constructed in 1997. There are plaques commemorating nine hundred years since Hilperton's entry in the Domesday Book, the village's win as "The Best Kept Village 2012", and a plaque commemorating the centenary of parish councils in 1994. The Paxcroft Mead Country Park has three "People in the Park" benches, one of which commemorates the tenth anniversary of the Paxcroft Mead Community Centre.

== Notable people ==
- Sir William Roger Brown (1831–1902), mill-owner and philanthropist
- Lee Probert (born 1972), Premier League referee
