= Dorchester RFC =

English rugby union club, based in Dorchester, Dorset

(England) Dorchester RFC
- Full name: Dorchester Rugby Football Club
- Union: Dorset & Wilts RFU
- Founded: 1871; 155 years ago
- Location: Dorchester, Dorset England
- Ground(s): Surcouf Park, Coburg Road
- Coach: Sam Cload
- League: Counties 2 Dorset & Wilts South
1st kit	2nd kit

Official website
- www.dorchester-rfc.co.uk

Dorchester Rugby Football Club is an English amateur rugby union club that is based in Dorchester, Dorset, England. The club currently play in Counties 2 Dorset & Wilts South - a tier 8 league in the English rugby union system - following their relegation from Counties 1 Southern South at the end of the 2024–25 season. Their home ground is Coburg Road, built on land leased from the Duchy of Cornwall. The club was first formed in 1871.

== Club Honours ==
1st Team

- Dorset & Wilts 1 South champions (3): 1990–91, (Note: Includes Berks/Dorset/Wilts 1 league title.) 2017–18, 2019–20
- Southern Counties champions: 1994–95
- South West 2 East champions: 1998–99
- Counties 2 Dorset & Wilts South champions: 2025-26
- Dorset & Wilts Cup winners: 1999–00
- Dorset & Wilts Senior Vase winners: 2017, 2020

2nd XV

- Dorset & Wilts 1 South champions: 2008–09
- Dorset & Wilts 3 South champions: 2011–12
- Dorset & Wilts 2 South champions: 2018–19
- Dorset & Wilts Cup 2nd XV Cup winners: 1995–96

3rd XV

- Dorset & Wilts South Matrix champions: 2019–20
- Dorset & Wilts 4 champions: 2014–15

Statistics

- Most games played for 1st XV — Frank Dike 658
- Most Games played for Dorchester — Frank Dike 969
- Most Tries scored for 1st XV — Tony Foot 138

1st XV biggest win vs. Ventnor, Isle of Wight, 4 October 1997: 99 – 7.
