= Royal Wootton Bassett RFC =

English rugby union club, based in Wiltshire

Royal Wootton Bassett
- Full name: Royal Wootton Bassett Rugby Football Club
- Union: Dorset and Wilts Rugby Football Union
- Founded: 1971; 55 years ago
- Location: Royal Wootton Bassett, Wiltshire, England
- Ground: Ballard's Ash Sports Ground (Capacity: 5,000)
- League: Regional 1 South West
- 2025–26: 6th

Official website
- www.rwbrfc.club

Royal Wootton Bassett Rugby Football Club is a rugby union club located in Royal Wootton Bassett, Wiltshire. The club operates four senior teams, two under-18s sides, girls rugby teams and a minis and junior section. The 1st XV play at the fifth level of the English rugby union system, participating in Regional 1 South West, following promotion from Regional 2 Severn in season 2023–24.

== History ==
Royal Wootton Bassett was formed in 1971 and when league rugby was introduced in 1987, they were placed in Berks/Dorset/Wilts 1. They stayed in that division until they gained their first promotion in 1993.

In 2016, the club was promoted to South West 1 East. They played in that division until the COVID-19 cancelled season in 2020, after which they were promoted to tier 5 as best runners-up. They remained at that level for three seasons when they finished second from bottom in Regional 1 South Central, resulting in relegation back to tier 6.

== Honours ==
- Regional 2 Severn champions: 2023–24
- Southern Counties South champions: 2015–16
- Berks/Dorset/Wilts 1 champions: 1992–93

=== Royal Wootton Basset II XV ===
- Dorset & Wilts 2 North champions: 2014–15

=== Royal Wootton Bassett III XV ===
- Dorset & Wilts 3 North champions: 2015–16
