= Marlborough RFC =

English rugby union club, based in Wiltshire

Marlborough
- Full name: Marlborough Rugby Football Club
- Union: Dorset and Wilts Rugby Football Union
- Founded: 1967; 58 years ago
- Location: Marlborough, Wiltshire
- Ground(s): The Moor
- League(s): Regional 1 South West
- 2024–25: 10th

Official website
- marlboroughrfc.rfu.club

Marlborough Rugby Football Club is an English rugby union club based in Marlborough, Wiltshire. The first XV team currently play in Regional 1 South West. The club also operates a second XV, a colts side and junior teams for both boys and girls.

When league rugby began in 1987, Marlborough was placed in Dorset & Wilts 1 North and in the following years, the club has been promoted on four occasions and now play in the fifth tier of the English rugby union system.

== Honours ==
- Regional 2 South East champions 2022–23
- Dorset & Wilts 1 North champions 2009–10, 2014–15
- Dorset & Wilts 2 North champions 2006–07, 2012–13
- Southern Counties North/Southern Counties South play-off winners 2017–18
