= Salisbury RFC =

English rugby union club, based in Wiltshire

Salisbury
- Full name: Salisbury Rugby Club
- Union: Dorset & Wilts RFU
- Nickname(s): Green and white
- Founded: 1912; 114 years ago
- Location: Salisbury, Wiltshire, England
- Ground: Castle Road (Capacity: 2,000 +100 covered seating)
- Chairman: Russell Jugg
- President: Richard Larcombe
- Coach(es): Gareth Blackborrow & David (Jonah) Thorpe
- Captain(s): Dan Hammond & Miles Thompson
- League: Regional 2 South Central
- 2022–23: 7th

Official website
- salisburyrfc.org

Salisbury Rugby Club is an English rugby union club in Salisbury, Wiltshire, who play in Regional 2 South Central, a level six league. The club is based at Hudson's Field, Castle Road, near Old Sarum.

Former players include Dave Egerton (Bath, England, British and Irish Lions), Richard Hill (Saracens, England, British and Irish Lions), Mike Brown (Harlequins Leicester Tigers and England), Will Stuart (Bath Rugby, England), Cadan Murley (Harlequins, England).

== Structure ==
Senior sections: the senior section has up to three teams who play regularly. There is currently no women’s senior squad.

Junior section: split into Minis and Juniors. The Minis accepts children from Reception to Year 6 (U6s to U11s). These are mixed and play in line with RFU Age Grade rugby (touch rugby up to and including U8s, and then contact from U9s to U11s). The Junior section splits into boys' and girls' squads with the boys having teams from U12 to U16s and the Colts, and the girls having U12s, U14, U16 and U18s groupings. This is in line with RFU Age Grade rugby. In season 25/26, the U14 and U15 Boy were age grade champions in the Dorset and Wiltshire RFU competition.

Charitable rugby: the club works in conjunction with charities and private coaches to train students at sixth form colleges in Salisbury and the surround area to have a Salisbury 6th Form Colleges team (in a Barbarians RFC-like set up). This initiative is endorsed by Mike Brown.

== Sponsors ==
Club sponsors include:

- Spire Printing
- Heritage VW – Mini Rugby
- Nunton Dairies – Mini Rugby
- Chaffyn Grove school – Mini coaches' kit
- Sarum Vision – Junior coaches' kit
- NFU Mutual – Junior playing strips

== Honours ==
- Dorset & Wilts Cup winners 1989–90
- South West 2 East champions: 1997–98
- Southern Counties (north v south) promotion play-off winners: 2000–01, 2014–15
- Southern Counties South champions: 2010–11
- Southern Counties Cup winners 2014–15
- South West 1 (east v west) promotion play-off winner: 2015–16

== See also ==
- Dorset and Wilts Rugby Football Union
