= Sherborne RFC =

English rugby union club, based in Dorset

Coordinates: 50.940501°N 2.511077°W

- Full name: Sherborne Rugby Football Club
- Union: Dorset & Wilts RFU
- Nickname: The Dorset All Blacks
- Founded: 1980; 46 years ago (Founder: Tom Kelly)
- Location: Sherborne, Dorset, England
- Region: South West
- Ground(s): Gainsborough Park, Terrace Playing Fields
- League: Counties 1 Southern South
- 2025–26: 1st (promoted to Regional 2 South West)
| 1st kit | 2nd kit |

Official website
- www.sherbornerugby.co.uk

Sherborne Rugby Football Club is a rugby union club in Dorset in the south west of England. The club was established in 1980. It has a membership of 100 senior players and a further 300 boys and girls in the junior section. The club runs one senior women's and two men's teams with the 1st XV currently playing in Regional 2 South West – a league at level 6 of the English rugby union system after a couple of seasons in Counties 1 Southern South ]]

== Ground and location ==
The clubhouse and grounds are located at the Terrace Playing Fields. The Terraces are an artificially created area of flat land made just before the start of the Second World War by levelling part of the valley sides on the southern boundary of the town.

In the club's first season they were allocated one pitch by the town council, located at the most exposed, western, corner of the ground. The clubhouse was the cricket clubhouse and so unused during the rugby season; a small wooden clapboard construction consisting of little more than a bar and small kitchen. As the membership and playing level of the club increased over the first few seasons, so the number of pitches being marked was increased and their location less remote. The clubhouse was also demolished and rebuilt in brick; a much more substantial construction including a much larger bar area, more substantial kitchen and storage rooms as well as four team changing-rooms, two referees' changing rooms and showers. Initially the bar area was to be divided in two, a main bar and a smaller committee and vice-presidents' bar. The wall had been built during the day before an evening team practice session and when the players found out about it they entered the construction site and pushed the wall down while the cement was still wet. They did not want the club to change from the small player-centered club that it was to a club where the Establishment with little real interest in rugby could network.

Since then another 8-changing-room facility, the Gainsborough Pavilion, was erected in 1999 next-door on the site of the former Sherborne Football clubhouse. These changing-rooms and showers are sometimes used by the rugby club, particularly when there are several teams playing at home on the same weekend.

Gainsborough Park is the rugby team's new two-pitch playing area on the south-eastern side of the Terrace car park, so called because it is on Gainsborough Hill. It was created as part of a deal between the Town Council, the Sherborne Castle Estates and the town – due in large part to the pressure applied by a group known as Save Foster's Field. The nine-acre playing fields of the former Foster's School were slated to be sold to a developer to construct houses. As the last remaining playing fields within the town this caused a furore amongst Sherborne residents and the problem persisted for nine years and directly influencing a change in the law. In 2002, after pressure from Sherborne residents, the then Secretary of State for Education, Charles Clarke, changed the rules such that first use of any money from the sale of a school playing field must be re-invested in improvements of outdoor facilities nearby. As a result, the sale of Foster's Field for an estimated £4 million meant that Sherborne Town Council were able to spend £1 million on the creation of Gainsborough Park from a piece of farmland owned by the Sherborne Castle Estates. In 2011, as the final part of this deal, floodlights were installed on the main pitch at Gainsborough Park.

The club has outgrown its current limited facilities and plans are in the pipeline to build a new club house closer to the new pitches and incorporating greater changing and support facilities.

== History ==
Following a couple of fortuitous meetings and discussions in The Digby Tap Public House, a group of players were put together by Alan Fall, Doug Hamilton and Tom Kelly in the second half of the 1979–80 season to play some friendly fixtures against the second or third teams of local sides, always playing away from home (as there was no home pitch) and wearing an assortment of mismatched jerseys. As a result of a determined effort by these three men, by the beginning of the 1980–81 season the club was fully functioning with a committee, complete fixture list, a home pitch on the Terrace Playing Fields, the use of Sherborne Cricket Club's clubhouse (on the site of the current Terrace Clubhouse) and a set of shirts complete with club emblem.

After various suggestions and discussions revolving around a multi-coloured set of shirts to reflect the disparate jerseys of their first unofficial matches the previous year, a playing kit of entirely black shirts, shorts and socks was chosen by the club members. This was in recognition of Charles John Monro who was believed to have been a Sherborne schoolboy who had introduced rugby to New Zealand in 1870. In addition, the New Zealand national team had recently had tours to the UK in 1978, 1979 and 1980 winning 34 of 36 games and the Sherborne players wanted to emulate their style of play and this success. Unfortunately for Sherborne, although Monro had taken the game to New Zealand, he was never at school in the town; he had actually been a pupil at Christ's College in Finchley near London. Remarkably, Sherborne does have a real connection with New Zealand rugby, the man who gave the Bledisloe Cup to be competed for between the national teams of Australia and New Zealand had been a boy at the School, Charles Bathurst, 1st Viscount Bledisloe!

By the end of the first season the fledgling club had won their division and were promoted. In the first eleven years of the club, Sherborne won their division five times, became runners-up four time, were promoted six times and were never relegated. The local press began referring to them as the Dorset All-Blacks. Players joined from a radius of 30 miles or more. The club put out a second XV for the first time in the 1981–82 season, they had a colts side in the 1983–84 season, then a third XV in 1985–86 and a fourth XV (nicknamed the Mooseheads) in 1986–87. At about the same time the junior section of the club was established with mini-rugby sessions being run on Sunday mornings.

The club achieved its zenith in its 13th and 14th seasons (1992–94), playing in South West One (the fifth level in the English rugby union system), playing against such clubs as Cinderford RFC, Henley RFC (then being coached by Clive Woodward), Maidenhead RFC and Salisbury RFC. Between 1993 and 1998 the club were relegated five times in five years back to the division they had occupied in their second season of existence. Since then the club has achieved an equilibrium in the seventh division of English rugby.

== Community links ==
The club has many close links with local community most notably The Gryphon School, Sherborne School and Sherborne Girls School.

=== Facilities ===
The club utilises the sporting facilities available at the schools to conduct training sessions, the weight room and gymnasia at Sherborne School, the Oxley AstroTurf at Sherborne Girls and the weight-room and AstroTurf at The Gryphon School are all frequently used by club teams from U16 through Colts to the senior sides.

=== Coaching ===
Many of the club's coaches have been physical education/sport teachers at one of the town's schools. Examples include Alan Fall (club founder member and first coach) teacher at the local secondary modern school St Aldhelm's School (now The Gryphon School), AM Davis, DP Jones and DA Scott from Sherborne School, SD Lilley was head of PE at Sherborne School when he was a player/coach and the current 1st XV coach (C Smith) is also in the PE Department at Sherborne School.

=== Playing ===
The club has, since the outset, welcomed players from the local grammar school (Foster's School) and the local secondary modern school (St Aldhelm's) and continues to gain much of its membership from The Gryphon School, now that all the senior state schools in the town have been merged into one comprehensive school.

On Sunday, 21 September 1986 Sherborne RFC played a match against the Sherborne Pilgrims, the Old Boys' side of Sherborne School. The fixture was played because a change in the laws of rugby meant that old boys' teams (usually made up of 18- to 20-year-olds) could no longer play against school sides (composed of 16- and 17-year-olds) as they traditionally always had. Rather than allow the Pilgrim's annual return to the town die, the fixture against the club was conceived. This was expected to become an annual fixture, unfortunately it seems to have been a one-off event.

For many years the boys at Sherborne School were forbidden, by the school, to play rugby for the club. In recent years this situation has changed and several pupils from the local private school turn out for the club, particularly in the Spring once the school rugby season has ended. On the evening of Tuesday 27 September 2011 the first match between the school and the club Colts (under 18) side took place under the club's new floodlights on Gainsborough Park, the final score was 34–24 to the school. Further playing links were established about ten weeks later when, on the evening of Tuesday, 13 December 2011, a Sherborne Invitation XV of under-18's players who either live, go to school or play rugby in the town was selected to take on a touring team from the Anglican Church Grammar School, Australia (known as Churchie). Sherborne players were drawn from the club, from Sherborne School, Bryanston School, King's Bruton, Thomas Hardye School and Yeovil College.

== Tours ==
=== Senior club tours ===
The club's first trip abroad was taken in its first year of existence, 1980. A minibus of players and their wives/girlfriends travelled to Sherborne's original twin town in France, Granville, to play in their annual seven-a-side tournament. The players and their partners were hosted in the homes of players from the Granville club. The trip became an annual event and was continued for at least the next ten years, Sherborne won the Granville Sevens cup in 1990/91.

In August 1988 Sherborne/Granville toured Kenya together, playing several matches in Nairobi and one in Mombasa. The floods that month in Sudan that caused a two-day delay in departure, staying at a hotel near Heathrow Airport, and a six-hour layover at an inundated Khartoum Airport (the only dry part of the city) surrounded by locals seeking refuge while the plane had one of its jet engines repaired.

In December 1990/January 1991 Sherborne toured California as "Wessex Rugby" (Sherborne plus a handful of invited players from the other local clubs). Landing in Los Angeles they played a tournament at the Finlander Rugby Club before travelling to San Diego as guests of Old Aztecs RFC. This was followed by a couple of days in Las Vegas before playing the next match in Visalia. Finally two matches were played in the San Francisco Bay Area, one in Monterey and the final match on the last day against Paxo (Palo Alto X-Olympic) Rugby Club in Palo Alto.

=== Junior section tours ===
The junior section of the club has organised end of season trips to other parts of the UK, Europe and even Africa and the Americas. The Under 16s have visited South Africa, France and the Netherlands in recent years. The Under 16's toured Canada in 2013 playing four matches, two against club sides (Balmy Beach RFC and Toronto Nomads RFC) and two against provincial sides; Ontario (in Ottawa) and Quebec (in Montreal). They won all four.

== Club playing achievements ==
| Season | | 1st XV Playing in | Division's level in English rugby | Outcome | | Other Achievements |
|---|---|---|---|---|---|---|
| 1st | 1980/81 | Dorset and Wilts Division III | 11 | Winners | ↑ | |
| 2nd | 1981/82 | Dorset and Wilts Division II | 10 | Runners-up | - | |
| 3rd | 1982/83 | Dorset and Wilts Division II | 10 | Winners | ↑ | |
| 4th | 1983/84 | Dorset and Wilts Division I | 9 | Runners-up | - | |
| 5th | 1984/85 | Dorset and Wilts Division I | 9 | Runners-up | - | |
| 6th | 1985/86 | Dorset and Wilts Division I | 9 | Winners | ↑ | Dorset Sevens runners-up |
| 7th | 1986/87 | Dorset Wilts and Berks Division I | 8 | | - | Dorset Sevens winners, Bristol & West Sevens winners |
| 8th | 1987/88 | Dorset Wilts and Berks Division I | 8 | | - | Dorset Sevens winners, Bass Star Cup winners |
| 9th | 1988/89 | Dorset Wilts and Berks Division I | 8 | | - | Bass Star Cup winners |
| 10th | 1989/90 | Dorset Wilts and Berks Division I | 8 | Winners | ↑ | Bass Star Cup winners |
| 11th | 1990/91 | Southern Counties | 7 | Winners | ↑ | Granville Sevens winners, hosted by Sherborne's French twin town Granville |
| 12th | 1991/92 | South West Division II | 6 | Runners-up | ↑ | Dorset & Wilts Cup runners-up |
| 13th | 1992/93 | South West Division I | 5 | | - | |
| 14th | 1993/94 | South West Division I | 5 | | ↓ | Dorset & Wilts Cup winners |
| 15th | 1994/95 | South West Division II | 6 | | ↓ | Dorset & Wilts 2nd XV's Cup winners |
| 16th | 1995/96 | Southern Counties | 7 | | ↓ | |
| 17th | 1996/97 | Dorset Wilts and Berks Division I | 8 | | ↓ | |
| 18th | 1997/98 | Dorset and Wilts Division I | 9 | | ↓ | |
| 19th | 1998/99 | Dorset and Wilts Division II | 10 | Winners | ↑ | |
| 20th | 1999/00 | Dorset and Wilts Division I | 9 | Winners | ↑ | |
| 21st | 2000/01 | Dorset Wilts and Berks Division I | 8 | | ↓ | |
| 22nd | 2001/02 | Dorset & Wilts 2 South | 9 | Winners | ↑ | |
| 23rd | 2002/03 | Dorset & Wilts 1 South | 8 | | - | |
| 24th | 2003/04 | Dorset & Wilts 1 South | 8 | Winners | ↑ | |
| 25th | 2004/05 | Southern Counties South | 7 | | - | |
| 26th | 2005/06 | Southern Counties South | 7 | | - | |
| 27th | 2006/07 | Southern Counties South | 7 | | - | |
| 28th | 2007/08 | Southern Counties South | 7 | | - | 2nd XV win Dorset and Wilts 2 South |
| 29th | 2008/09 | Southern Counties South | 7 | | - | |
| 30th | 2009/10 | Southern Counties South | 7 | 4th | - | 2nd XV runners up Dorset and Wilts Division 2 South and win Dorset and Wilts Vase. U18's Dorset and Wilts League and Dorset and Wilts Cup winners |
| 31st | 2010/11 | Southern Counties South | 7 | | - | U18's Dorset and Wilts Cup winners |
| 32nd | 2011/12 | Southern Counties South | 7 | | - | U18's Dorset and Wilts Cup winners |
| 33rd | 2012/13 | Southern Counties South | 7 | | - | |
| 34th | 2013/14 | Southern Counties South | 7 | | - | U18's Dorset and Wilts Cup winners |
| 35th | 2014/15 | Southern Counties South | 7 | 3rd | - | |
| 36th | 2015/16 | Southern Counties South | 7 | 5th | - | |
| 37th | 2016/17 | Southern Counties South | 7 | 3rd | - | |
| 38th | 2017/18 | Southern Counties South | 7 | 3rd | - | |
| 39th | 2018/19 | Southern Counties South | 7 | Winners | ↑ | |
| 40th | 2019/20 | South West 1 East | 6 | 6th | - | |
| 41st | 2020/21 | South West 1 East | 6 | Season cancelled due to the COVID-19 pandemic. | | |
| 42nd | 2021/22 | South West 1 East | 6 | 10th | → | |
| 43rd | 2022/23 | Regional 2 South West | 6 | 11th | ↓ | |
| 44th | 2023/24 | Counties 1 Southern South | 7 | 3rd | - | |
| 45th | 2024/25 | Counties 1 Southern South | 7 | 3rd | - | |
| 46th | 2025/26 | Counties 1 Southern South | 7 | Winners | ↑ | |
| 47th | 2026/27 | | | | | |

== Honours (trophies) ==
1st team:

- Dorset & Wilts 3 Merit League champions: 1980–81
- Dorset & Wilts 2 Merit League champions: 1982–83
- Dorset & Wilts 1 Merit League champions: 1985–86
- Dorset Sevens winners (2): 1986–87, 1987–88
- Bristol Sevens winners: 1986–87
- Bass Star Cup winners (3): 1987–88, 1988–89, 1989–90
- Granville Sevens winners: 1990–91
- Southern Counties South champions (2): 1990–91 (Note: 1990–91 title was when league was single division known as Southern Counties.), 2018–19
- Dorset & Wilts Cup winners: 1993–94
- Dorset & Wilts Division II champions: 1998–99
- Dorset & Wilts Division I champions: 1999–00
- Dorset & Wilts 2 champions: 2001–02
- Dorset & Wilts 1 champions (2): 1989–90, 2003–04
- Counties 1 Southern South champions: 2025–26

2nd team:

- Dorset & Wilts 2nd XV's Cup winners: 1994–95
- Dorset & Wilts 2 South champions (2): 2007–08, 2017–18
- Dorset & Wilts Vase: 2009-10

Youth

- U18s Dorset & Wilts League champions: 2009–10
- U18s Dorset & Wilts Cup winners (4): 2009–10, 2010–11, 2011–12, 2013-14

== Representative honours ==
=== International ===
==== Full senior international caps ====
- Mike Davis, Former England Rugby player and England head coach coached Sherborne RFC for many years between 1984 and 2009.
- (East Africa Protectorate) Doug Hamilton, captain of Kenya and a player and later manager of East Africa between 1970 and 1978 before moving to Sherborne where he was pivotal in the founding of Sherborne RFC.
- Dean Ryan, played for Saracens, Wasps, Newcastle and Bristol. Represented England (1990–1998) in the back row, scoring a try in his debut match.
- Kevin Graham, first played for Zimbabwe at the inaugural Rugby World Cup in New Zealand in 1987; recently arrived in Sherborne where he continues to be active with the Sherborne RFC touch group.
- Oliver Devoto, England (2016 & 2020)
- Harriet Cumber, Scotland Sevens (2012–2015) and Scotland (wing 2014/15 versus Italy)

==== Other international caps ====
- Nigel Francis, Wales deaf XV's and VII's (2009–2011)
- George Buckney, England Under 16 prop 2010/11 versus Italy and Wales
- Oliver Devoto, England U19 (2010/11), England U20 (2013), England XV (2014), England Saxons (2016)
- Tom James, England Students (2016)
- Tom Lawday, England Students (2016)

=== Other players of note ===
Players from Sherborne RFC who have gone on to play club rugby at the highest level.

- Will Carrick-Smith, Exeter Chiefs (2012–2015) London Scottish (2015/16) and Bedford Blues (2016–2020) and Richmond (2021- )
- Harriet Cumber, Murrayfield Wanderers, Worcester Valkyries (2018– )
- Oliver Devoto, Bath Rugby (2012–2016), Exeter Chiefs (2016– )
- Tom James, BUCS Finalist with Loughborough University Bedford Blues (2016/17), Doncaster Knights (2017–2020), Northampton Saints (2020– )
- Tom Lawday, Exeter Chiefs (2017–2019) loaned to Cornish Pirates (2017/18 from Exeter), Harlequin F.C. (2019– )
- Alice Lockwood, Bristol Bears (2019– )
- Darren Morris, Harlequin F.C.
- Richard Nias, played Flanker for Harlequin F.C. (2000) and Worcester Warriors (2002–03).
- Sam Nixon, London Scottish Academy, Plymouth Albion (2016/17), Bath Academy (2017–2019) (loaned to Yorkshire Carnegie 2018), Bath (2019–2020) and Bayonne (2020– ).
- Glen O'Loughlin, three caps for the Royal Navy, 1992 (versus Army) & 1997 (versus Army and RAF)
- Fergus Taylor, Oxford Blue (2016 & 2017), captain (2017), Varsity Cup Winner (2016), CUS Genova Rugby (see Italian Wikipedia page), Genoa, Serie A, Italy (2017–2019) and VII Rugby Torino (see Italian Wikipedia page), Turin, Serie A, Italy (2019– )
- Jake Woolmore, Exeter Chiefs (2014–16), Jersey Reds (2016–2018), Bristol Bears (2018– )

== Club honours board (players) ==
Club Honours
| Season | President | Chairman | Club Captain | Honours Caps |
|---|---|---|---|---|
| 1980/81 | - | TF Kelly | DP Hamilton | A March, P Ollis, K Rowland |
| 1981/82 | - | TF Kelly | DP Hamilton | I Aplin, S Dustan, S O'Loughlin |
| 1982/83 | TF Kelly | DP Hamilton | S O'Loughlin | J Andrews, A Fall |
| 1983/84 | TF Kelly | DP Hamilton | S O'Loughlin | G Churchill, S Clothier, C Gale |
| 1984/85 | TF Kelly | DP Hamilton | A James | S Dustan, A Tucker |
| 1985/86 | TF Kelly | C Thomas-Peter | A Tucker | DP Hamilton |
| 1986/87 | WD Christopher | C Thomas-Peter | P Rushton | D O'Loughlin, MJ Walker |
| 1987/88 | WD Christopher | C Thomas-Peter | P Rushton | R Robinson |
| 1988/89 | WD Christopher | C Thomas-Peter | P Rushton | - |
| 1989/90 | WD Christopher | S Clothier | A Tucker | J Churchill |
| 1990/91 | WD Christopher | S Clothier | A Tucker | M Burks, G Churchill |
| 1991/92 | WD Christopher | S Clothier | A Tucker | K Hunt, S Hunt |
| 1992/93 | WD Christopher | S Clothier | A Tucker | - |
| 1993/94 | WD Christopher | C Phipps | A Tanner | - |
| 1994/95 | WD Christopher | C Phipps | A Tucker | - |
| 1995/96 | WD Christopher | C Phipps | S Vevers | M Burks, J Churchill, D O'Loughlin |
| 1996/97 | D Ireland | C Phipps | S Eagles | A James |
| 1997/98 | C Phipps | M Burks | B Frampton | - |
| 1998/99 | C Phipps | M Burks | A Workman | - |
| 1999/00 | C Phipps | M Burks | G Fingland | S Devoto, M Hill, K Hunt, J Nutland, M Trew |
| 2000/01 | C Phipps | M Burks | M Hill | M Barrow, A Workman |
| 2001/02 | B Allan | M Trew | J Gower | J Gower, M Green, M Trew |
| 2002/03 | B Allan | M Trew | J Gower | N Garland, B Heal |
| 2003/04 | R King | M Trew | J Gower | M Hobden, G Siggins |
| 2004/05 | R King | M Trew | R Nias | R Holder |
| 2005/06 | S Mottram | M Trew | J Gower | C Andrews, M Carvell, N O'Grady |
| 2006/07 | S Mottram | M Trew | J Gower | S Devoto, R Nias |
| 2007/08 | S Mottram | M Trew | S Newton | J Andrews, T Berry, J Bolwell |
| 2008/09 | S Mottram | M Trew | N Rowe | A Nixon, D O'Loughlin |
| 2009/10 | S Mottram | M Trew | N Rowe | M Burks, S Devoto, J Gower, C Thomas-Peter, B Whittaker |
| 2010/11 | S Mottram | M Trew | | J Andrews, S Devoto, B Pennington |
| 2011/12 | S Mottram | M Trew | B Harvey | G Buckney, O Devoto |
| 2012/13 | S Mottram | M Trew | J Newby | N Brook |
| 2013/14 | S Mottram | M Trew | J Newby | - |
| 2014/15 | S Mottram | M Trew | J Newby | S Brady, P Cuff, R O’Loughlin |
| 2015/16 | S Mottram | M Trew | T O'Loughlin | J Flynn Sr. |
| 2016/17 | S Mottram | M Trew | T O'Loughlin | T Hopkins, N O'Grady |
| 2017/18 | S Mottram | M Trew | T O'Loughlin | S Vincent, C Smith, E Kuhn, M Cole |
| 2018/19 | S Mottram | M Trew | C Jones | G Reynolds, B Cass, H Hodgson, T Siggins |
| 2019/20 | S Mottram | M Trew | C Jones | |
| 2020/21 | S Mottram | M Trew | C Jones | |
| 2021/22 | S Mottram | M Trew | B Austin | T Hopkins, J Chandler, P Hitch |
| 2022/23 | S Mottram | M Trew | B Austin | R Hunt, R O'Loughlin, S Vincent |
| 2023/24 | S Mottram | M Trew | B Austin | S Whittaker |
| 2023/24 | S Mottram | M Trew | G Tuffin | |
| 2024/25 | S Mottram | M Trew | B Austin | |
| 2024/25 | S Mottram | M Trew | E Hahne | |
| 2025/26 | S Mottram | M Trew | | |
