= Church of St Peter, Redlynch =

Church in Somerset, England

Church of St Peter
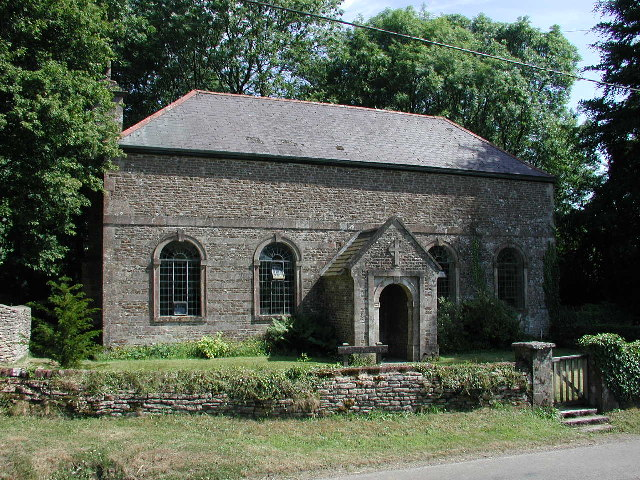

- Location within Somerset
- 51.0984°N 2.4300°W
- Location: Redlynch, Somerset, England

History
- Built: c. 1750

Listed Building – Grade II*
- Official name: Church of St Peter
- Designated: 24 March 1961
- Reference no.: 1176298

The Anglican Church of St Peter in Redlynch, Somerset, England was built in about 1750. It is a Grade II* listed building.

== History ==
The church was built in about 1750 by Stephen Fox-Strangways, 1st Earl of Ilchester (1704–1776) on his estate of Redlynch, to the designs of Nathaniel Ireson of Wincanton, who was also the master-builder of his new mansion house known as Redlynch Park. It replaced the medieval parish church which stood on the same spot.

== Architecture ==
The stone building has Doulting stone dressings and Welsh slate roofs. The five bays make up a single-cell plan. The porch and vestry have been added since the original construction. On the roof is a bell turret.

The interior includes panels with plasterwork decorations and a reredos with Ionic columns. There is a memorial to a soldier from World War I.

== See also ==
- List of ecclesiastical parishes in the Diocese of Bath and Wells
