= Church of St Peter and St Paul, Wincanton =

Church in Somerset, England

Church of St Peter and St Paul
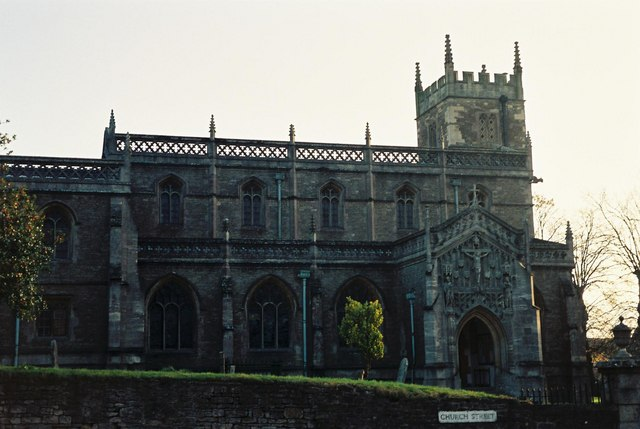

- Location within Somerset
- 51°03′18″N 2°24′49″W
- Location: Wincanton, Somerset, England

History
- Rebuilt: 1887-91

Site notes
- Architect: J. D. Sedding

Listed Building – Grade II*
- Designated: 24 March 1961
- Reference no.: 1238534

The Anglican Church of St Peter and St Paul in Wincanton within the English county of Somerset is a Grade II* listed building. The Church of St Peter and St Paul was almost totally rebuilt 1887-91 by J. D. Sedding, however parts of the tower may be remnants form an earlier church, dating from 1313, on the same site.

== History ==
Little of the original church remains but it is known that in 1748 Nathaniel Ireson, a local architect built and paid for a new chancel, which has been removed in subsequent renovations, and carved several of the memorial tablets. In 1793 the tower was raised by 12 feet (4 m) making it 50 feet (15 m) high, five bells were cast and a sixth added.

Because of the state of the roofs, which are under repair, the church is included on the Heritage at Risk Register.

== Architecture ==
The stone building has almost flat lead roofs behind parapets. It consists of a nave, chancel, north aisle and a double width south aisle, organ chamber, lady chapel, and north porch. The porch which was built in 1891 has a Calvary scene above the arch. The three-stage tower is supported by diagonal offset buttresses and a corner stair turret. The east window has stained glass by Clayton and Bell which was installed in 1889.

== Churchyard ==
The churchyard includes a self designed and carved monument to Nathaniel Ireson who died in 1769. The statue in 18th century costume faces south west and stands on a square plinth inscribed to Nathanial Ireson and his family. The pedestal has been replaced since the original statue was erected. Another memorial, erected early in the 19th century is to Elliot Grasset Thomas and his family. Only the plinth with his coat of arms survives from the original structure.

The stone walls and gateways around the churchyard were built in 1818. The north east gateway is the largest of several entrances to the site.

== See also ==
- List of ecclesiastical parishes in the Diocese of Bath and Wells
