= Redlynch =

Redlynch may refer to:

- Redlynch, Queensland, Australia
- Redlynch, Somerset, England, United Kingdom
- Redlynch, Wiltshire, England, United Kingdom
