= Wincanton Town Hall =

Municipal building in Wincanton, Somerset, England

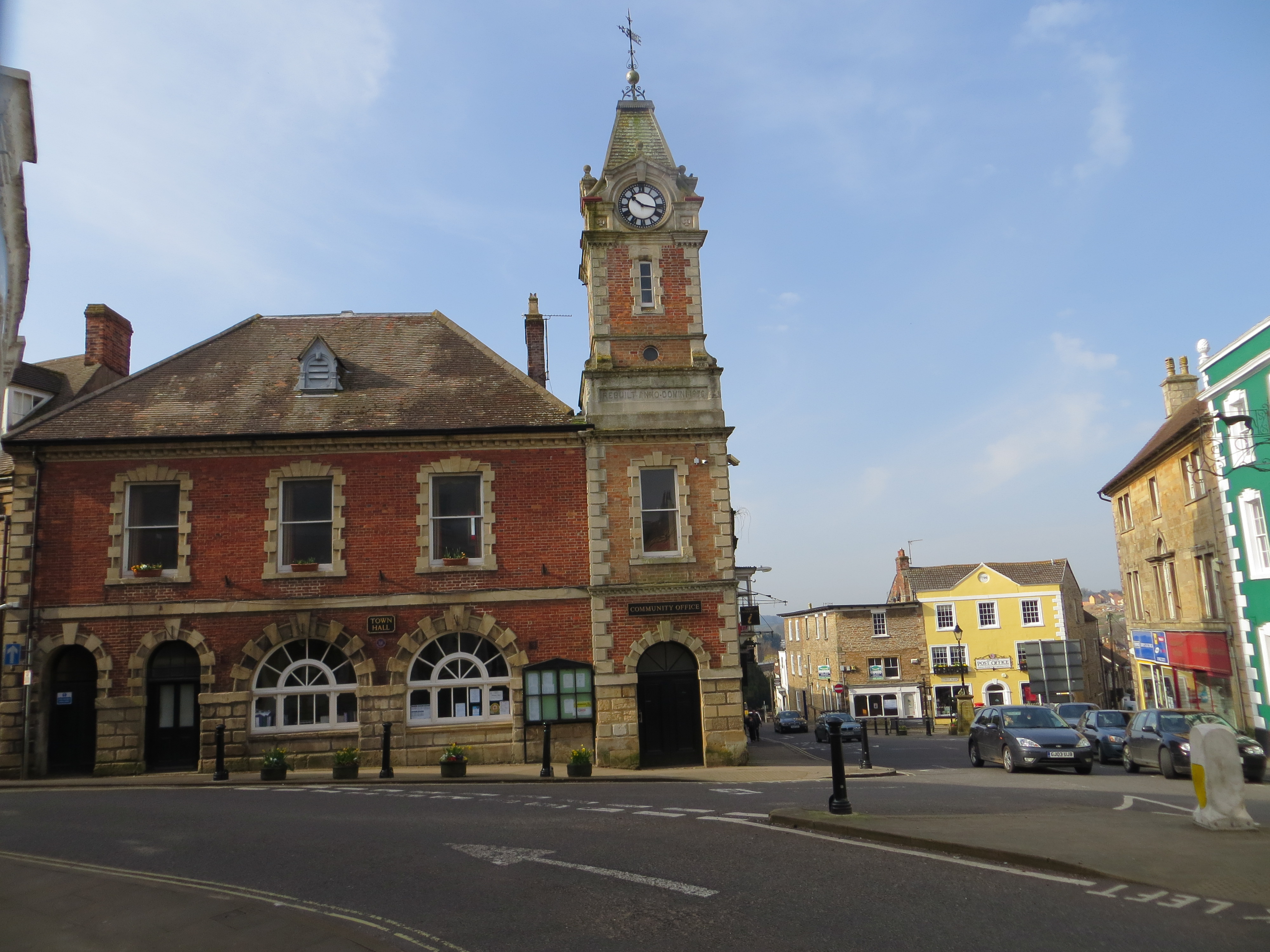
- The building in 2014

- Shown in Somerset
- 51.0562°N 2.4109°W
- Location: Market Place, Wincanton

History
- Built: 1878

Site notes
- Architect: William John Willcox
- Architectural style: Queen Anne style

Listed Building – Grade II
- Official name: Town Hall
- Designated: 25 January 1985
- Reference no.: 1274059

Wincanton Town Hall is a municipal building in the Market Place in Wincanton, a town in Somerset in England. The building, which currently accommodates the offices and meeting place of Wincanton Town Council and also operates as a community centre, is a Grade II listed building.

== History ==
The first municipal building in Wincanton was an ancient market house which was erected on pillars, so that markets could be held, with an assembly hall on the first floor. The assembly room was the meeting place of the bailiff and other officers of the borough, which was created in the 14th century. Already in a dilapidated condition, it was demolished by a mob during a riot in 1767.

A second municipal building was built on the same site in 1769. It was built in red brick with stone dressings and featured a lock-up for petty criminals on the ground floor and a courtroom on the first floor. It was restored and enlarged in 1867 but, along with two adjoining properties, was burned down in a major fire in August 1877.

The current town hall was designed by William John Willcox of Bath in the Queen Anne style, built by Joseph Bird of Writhlington in red brick with stone dressings at a cost of £877 and was completed in September 1878. The tower was provided with a clock and bell by Gillett & Bland of Croydon. Although erected on the site of its predecessor, the opportunity was taken to widen the road. There was initially a market held in the undercroft, but in 1893 a separate market hall was built, and the undercroft was fully enclosed. The town hall served as the meeting place of the parish council which, after local government reorganisation in 1974, was succeeded by Wincanton Town Council. It also became a community centre with access to a food fridge. It was opened up to serve as a refuge for stranded drivers during the snow storms, which blew in from the US, in early March 2018.

Works of art in the town hall include a portrait by L. Swinnerton Dyer of the Speaker of the House of Commons and Chief Justice of the Common Pleas, Sir James Dyer, who owned the rectory at Staplegrove rear Taunton and returned it to religious use. The portrait is a copy, probably copied from the version in the vicarage at Longburton, intended to replace a much earlier version which was destroyed in the fire at the town hall in August 1877.

== Architecture ==
The building is designed in the Queen Anne style, in imitation of the work of the local architect, Nathaniel Ireson. It is a two-storey brick building, with stone dressings, including a plinth, band course and cornice. At the north-east corner is a three-stage tower, with a round-headed doorway with stone voussoirs and a keystone in the first stage, a sash window with a Gibbs surround in the second stage, and an oculus and a lancet window in the third stage, all surmounted by a clock, a steep tiled roof and a weather vane. To the left of the tower is the east facing façade, which originally featured three round headed openings with Gibbs surrounds. The first opening has since been replaced by two doorways. The first floor is fenestrated by three sash windows with rusticated surrounds and keystones. A dormer vent in the centre of the roof was presented by Captain Benjamin Morton Festing of the Royal Navy. The building was grade II listed in 1985.
