= John Ring (surgeon) =

British surgeon (1752–1821)

John Ring (1752–1821) was an English surgeon, vaccination activist, and man of letters.

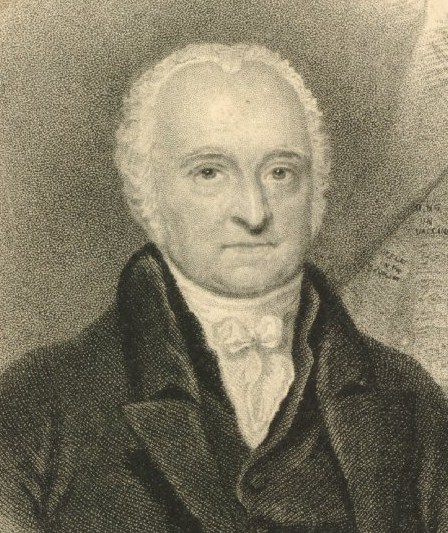
John Ring

== Life ==
The son of Richard Ring, he was born at Wincanton in Somerset, and was baptised there on 21 August 1752. He entered Winchester College in 1765, and left it in 1767–8. He then went to London, where he attended the lectures of Percivall Pott, John Hunter and William Hunter.

Ring received the diploma of the Surgeons' Company on 1 September 1774, and went into practise in London. He became a member of the Medical Society of London, then newly founded, and later was elected a member of the Medical Society of Paris.

An attack on cow-pox treatment made by Benjamin Moseley, physician to the Chelsea Hospital, brought from Ring a refutation, Then in August 1799, he met Edward Jenner, and they became friends. From 1799 Ring devoted most of his professional life to the cause of vaccination. He had leading medical men in London sign a document acknowledging that cow-pox was a much milder and safer disease than inoculated smallpox. He went to Ringwood in 1808 at the head of a deputation to investigate some supposed failures of vaccination; feeling was running so high that the deputies carried pistols.

The British Vaccine Establishment was founded in 1809, later the National Vaccine Establishment and a government department for the distribution of vaccine. Jenner was appointed the first director, and he nominated Ring to act as his principal vaccinator and inspector of stations. Ring was set aside, however, and Jenner resigned his post, which was then filled by James Moore, a brother of Sir John Moore.

Ring opened his own vaccinating station, which became popular. He died of apoplexy at his house in New Street, Hanover Square, London, on 7 December 1821.

== Works ==
Besides tracts on vaccination (1804 and 1805), Ring was author of:

- The Commemoration of Handel, published anonymously in 1786; 2nd edit., 1819.
- Reflections on the Surgeons Bill, London, 1798.
- A Treatise on Cow-pox, 2 parts, London, 1801–3.
- The Beauties of the "Edinburgh Review", alias the Stinkpot of Literature, London, 1807.
- A Treatise on the Gout, London, 1811.
- Answer to Dr. Kinglake, showing the danger of his Cooling Treatment of the Gout, London, 1816. Against Robert Kinglake.
- A Caution against Vaccine Swindlers and Impostors, London, 1816.

Ring also translated

- Alexander Geddes's Ode to Peace, 1802;
- Christopher Anstey's Carmen Alcaicum, addressed to Jenner, 1804, the profits going to the Royal Jennerian Society for the Extermination of Smallpox; and
- The Works of Virgil, partly original and partly altered from Dryden and Pitt (2 vols. London, 1820).

== Notes ==
Attribution

This article incorporates text from a publication now in the public domain: Lee, Sidney, ed. (1896). "Ring, John". Dictionary of National Biography. Vol. 48. London: Smith, Elder & Co.
