= The Gryphon School =

- The Gryphon School logo.

Location
- Bristol Road; Sherborne, Dorset, DT9 4EQ; England; 50°57′32″N 2°30′51″W

Information
- Type: Secondary Academy
- Religious affiliation: Church of England
- Established: 1992
- Local authority: Dorset
- Trust: Sherborne Schools' Area Trust (SAST)
- Ofsted: Reports
- Headmaster: James Gower
- Gender: Mixed
- Age: 11 to 18
- Enrolment: 1,560
- Website: http://www.gryphon.dorset.sch.uk

The Gryphon School is a Church of England secondary school with academy status for 11 to 18-year-olds in Sherborne, Dorset, England. The school has been the largest member of the Academy Trust "Sherborne Area Schools' Trust" (SAST) since June 2017. Established in September 1992, student numbers have grown steadily from 850 to almost 1,600 as of September 2017. The sixth form has around 400 students and teaches a variety of A-levels. In September 2005, the school achieved Business and Enterprise Specialist School. - However the school no longer uses this as its title following the re-brand in 2013. The school includes the Main Gryphon Secondary School, The Gryphon Sixth Form and Forget Me Not nursery.

== History of The Gryphon School ==
The Gryphon School was created from an amalgamation of three schools: Lord Digby's Girls School (1743–1992), Foster's Grammar School for Boys (1640–1992) and St Aldhelm's Secondary Modern School (1959–1992). This merger is not forgotten, and many students come to understand how their school was formed through a miniature history lesson provided in physical education lessons. This miniature history lesson ties in with the school's sporting competitiveness, and the names of the three merged schools and the new school name "The Gryphon School" still exist as sporting houses. Students are assigned a house as to which they are a part of during inter-house events such as rugby, football and hockey in addition to the more known "sports day".

The main school building is modelled in a post-modern architectural style, of which pays homage to the local vernacular; it’s yellow bricks in fitting with the honey coloured stone of Sherborne and the surrounding area, as well as its red-tiled hipped roofs, and classic four-pane windows.

The school converted to academy status in August 2012.

In June 2017, the school joined the newly established multi-academy trust "Sherborne Area Schools' Trust".

== Sherborne Area Schools' Trust (SAST) ==
As of 1 June 2017, the school became a founding member of the Sherborne Area Schools' Trust. This newly established multi-academy trust was formed to create a formal partnership between member schools: Buckland Newton CE Primary, St Andrews CE Primary (Yetminster), Sherborne Primary, Sherborne Abbey CE Primary, St Mary's CE Primary (Bradford Abbas), The Gryphon School and Thornford CE Primary. In 2019, King Arthur's Community School become a SAST member, becoming the second secondary school in The Trust. The trust is growing, with Charlton Horethorne Primary School being the latest school to join, in mid-2019.

The Gryphon School is the largest member school of the Trust with 1560 in the school, and an over 3300 pupils in Trust combined, including The Gryphon School.

Steven Hillier, the Headmaster of The Gryphon School until June 2017 was appointed Executive Head of the multi-academy trust. With Nicki Edwards becoming the Headmistress of The Gryphon School as of June 2017.

== Years ==
=== Year 7 ===
Year 7 students go on a variety of trips including to both local Castle, Sherborne Old Castle and Sherborne New Castle. Other trips include Geography excursions.

=== Year 8 ===
In Year Eight students take the same subjects as in the previous year but at the end of year seven are given the choice of two additional modern foreign languages: Spanish, French or German.

=== Year 9 ===
During the Spring Term Year Nine students have a series of information assemblies and tasters for GCSE subjects that they have not already studied in Key Stage 3 (KS3), they then choose what courses they would like to sit for GCSE.

They also go on various international trips to aid their learning about the country's cultures.

=== Year 10 ===
Year 10 is the start of GCSE where students begin to study the content they will be examined on during year 11. During year 10 students who took additional and core-science take they GCSE core science exams in Biology, Physics and Chemistry.

For some subjects, coursework is completed in year 10 that contributes towards the end GCSE. However, from 2017, much of this coursework will no longer exist due to the new '100% exam' system brought in by the Government.

=== Year 11 ===
Year 11 is the year where the full exams for the chosen GCSE subjects take place between May and June. Before then year 11 students spend the first part of the year learning content for exams and revising for exams.

After May half-term year 11 students go on study leave. This means that they no longer attend normal school lessons, but can return for revision and return for the remaining exams. At the end of June, once all the exams are completed, year 11 officially don't attend the school. Many students go to the Gryphon Sixth Form, but many go to college or take on apprenticeships in the following September.

== Exam results ==
Exam	2007	2008	2009	2010	2011	2012	2013	2014	2015	2016	2017	2018	2019
GCSE 5 A* - C inc. EM 1	55%	61.09%	53%	-	64%	56%	62%	65%	72%	70%	72%	-	-
GCSE A* - A (9 - 7)	-	-	-	-	26%	25%	31%	27%	28%	25%	21%	25%	21.6%
GCSE A* - C (9 - 4)	-	-	-	74%	-	-	81%	78%	80%	-	-	79%	78.7%
GCSE Progress 8 Score	-	-	-	-	-	-	-	-	-	0.09	0.17	0.12	-
A Level A* - A	-	-	-	-	-	27%	34%	29%	30%	27%	25%	32%	-
A Level A* - B 2	-	51.39%	-	48%	52%	53%	62%	55%	55%	-	-	-	-
A Level A* - C	-	-	-	73%	77%	77%	85%	78%	82%	79%	78%	-	-
A Level Pass Rate	-	-	-	99.4%	97%	98%	94%	99%	99%	99.6%	99%	-	-

1-A table showing the percentage of Gryphon School students who got 5 A*-C grades including English and Maths at GCSE level. From 2017 A*-C also equates to the new 9-4 grades
2-A table showing A* A and B grade results as a percentage of entries for Sixth Formers.

== Sixth form college ==
The Gryphon School has a sixth form college which consists of years 12 and 13. The sixth form students have the opportunity to take GCE A-level courses in a wide variety of subjects, along with a selection of Level-3 BTEC subjects.

Students who are part of the sixth form are exempt from the uniform policies that years 7-11 are obliged to follow; and as a result do not have to wear uniform.

The sixth form students make use of many perks such as a dedicated common room in the centre of the school, adjacent to the Gryphon Café and close to the Learning Resource Centre with its own Sixth Form only provision, notably an alternative mezzanine for Sixth Formers with computers. The introduction of a new 'Sixth Form Café' in 2017 allows students to purchase food that is not available to lower years due to the strict laws on food sold to under 16 year-olds.

The general area of which the students attending the sixth form travel in from is larger than that of the rest of the school. Many of these students travel by bus, lift share, or drive themselves in once they can drive.

== Site Development and Expansion ==
Over recent years the school has been investing in the facilities in the school to make them better and more suited to the current student base of almost 1,600.

Here is a list of the main projects the school has completed and what projects are planned for the near future on school facilities.

- 2004 - AstroTurf added to sports centre.
- 2004 - New outdoor geography classrooms added.
- 2006 - Conference Centre and new reception built.
- 2009 - Sixth form common room moved.
- 2012 - Canteen expanded.
- 2013-14 - Sports Centre refurbished.
- 2013-14 - Pool removed.
- 2014 - New two-story building with two classrooms and a lift built at the far-end of the school.
- 2014 - 'The Pod' built to reduce canteen queues and sells quick takeaway food to all students.
- 2015 - Inner 'quads' levelled and grass replaced with synthetic grass.
- 2017 - New Sixth Form only café opened in the common room to reduce queue sizes for the main school café. It also is able to sell different products as it has fewer regulations set on sugar and fat contents.
- Planned - New 10 classroom block to replace outdoor classrooms in History and Geography.

The future plans for the school are to allow for the rapidly growing number of students in the school. They are also planned to replace the separate building that makes up the Geography and History department; which were only originally meant to be temporary buildings to house the growing number of students. As of 2016, the school is still trying to gain grants given by local authorities for the construction new building.

== Transport ==
The large catchment area of the school has meant that many people use the buses operating to and from the school as their main means of transport. In addition to this, the school has multiple car parks and does allow sixth-formers who can drive to park in the school carparks - though it can get very congested at busy times and finding a space can become difficult. Bike racks are available for those who travel by bike, and the school has good pavement links for walking into and from the rest of Sherborne. In 2019, a proposed puffin crossing on Bristol Road has been approved to be built which will make the walk into the centre of town much safer.

Many students travel from far villages and towns or out of catchment; The Gryphon School caters private AM and PM bus services provided by local tour and coach hire operators (South West Tours, Bakers, Vale Coaches etc.). If a service is destined within Dorset students are eligible for free transport as provided by Dorset County Council "School Transport" scheme. By school invitation, First Group, the local bus service operator was allocated a bay in the bus park and allowed access twice a day to offer students in both Sherborne and Yeovil a service into the school.

As of Summer 2018, the main provider of both private- and council-funded buses into the school are operated by South West Coaches, following the surprise collapse of the Nippy Bus company.

== Boris Johnson graffiti ==
In January 2020, an Instagram account posted a picture referencing the UK Prime Minister with the words "F*ck Boris" graffitied onto one of the school walls. Local MP Chris Loder contacted the school and teachers promptly took the account down. An anonymous parent of a gryphon student contacted freelance journalist website Byline Times, who then claimed that "political surveillance" was used to help identify the owner of the account. Loder said those claims were 'totally unfounded', with his spokesman adding that Loder happened to find the Instagram account while "browsing online, nothing more than that". A spokesperson for The Gryphon reaffirms the schools political independence and ask that when students express their own political opinions and ideals, they "do not reference our school when doing so".

== Notable alumni ==
- Ollie Devoto – Exeter Chiefs and England rugby player
- Ben Hardy – actor
- Sophie Irwin – romance novelist
- Tom James – Northampton Saints rugby player
- Chris Loder – MP for West Dorset
- Ruby White - Team GB Boxer (2026)
