= Robert Kinglake (physician) =

British physician (1765–1842)

Robert Kinglake M.D. (1765–1842) was an English physician, known as a medical writer.

== Life ==
Kinglake graduated M.D. at the university of Göttingen, and also studied at the university of Edinburgh. After practising for some years as a surgeon at Chipping Norton, Oxfordshire, he moved to Chilton-upon-Polden in Somerset, and in 1802 to Taunton. At this period Kinglake worked part-time for the Pneumatic Institution.

At Taunton Kinglake attended public meetings and made speeches in support of the first Reform Bill. He died on 26 September 1842 at West Monkton rectory, near Taunton, the home of his son W. C. Kinglake. He was a member of the Royal Medical Society of Edinburgh, the Physical Society of Göttingen, and other learned bodies.

== Works ==
Kinglake attracted attention with his controversial writings on gout, in which he advocated a refrigeration treatment. It was based on application of cloths soaked in a mixture of ammonia and cold water. His first papers on the subject appeared in 1801 and 1803 in the Medical and Physical Journal. His views were opposed by William Wadd, W. Perry, John Hunt, John Ring, and others. James Parkinson launched a major attack in 1805, in Observations on the Nature and Cure of the Gout (1805).

Kinglake replied to his critics in:

- A Dissertation on Gout (with appendix), London, 1804.
- Reply to Mr. Edlin's two Cases of Gout, Taunton, 1804.
- Additional Cases of Gout, Taunton, 1807.
- Strictures on Mr. Parkinson's Observations on the Nature and Cure of Gout. … To which are added, Two Letters to Dr. Haygarth, containing Remarks on the Opinions he has lately published on Acute Rheumatism, Taunton, 1807.

He also published "Observations on the Medicinal Effects of Digitalis" in the Medical and Physical Journal for 1800. In Robert Macnish's Anatomy of Drunkenness, there is a short article by the author on Kinglake's experiment with ether.

== Notes ==
Attribution

This article incorporates text from a publication now in the public domain: Lee, Sidney, ed. (1892). "Kinglake, Robert". Dictionary of National Biography. Vol. 31. London: Smith, Elder & Co.
