= Lucy Giles =

British Army officer (born 1969)

Colonel Lucy Margaret Giles CBE (born 1969) is a former British Army officer. In 2016, she was the first woman appointed as a College Commander at the Royal Military Academy Sandhurst, and was later President of the Army Officer Selection Board and Colonel Commandant of the Royal Logistic Corps.

== Early life ==
Born in Yeovil, Somerset, in June 1969, Giles was educated at King Arthur's School, Wincanton, and then in the sixth form of Sexey's School, Bruton. She studied Biology at the University of Exeter, where she joined the Officers' Training Corps. On 29 September 1989, while at Exeter, she was commissioned as a 2nd Lieutenant into the Territorial Army and the Women's Royal Army Corps.

== Career ==
On 5 January 1991, Giles transferred as a 2nd Lieutenant to the Regular Army's Royal Corps of Transport. She was promoted to Captain in the Royal Logistic Corps in April 1995. In June 2011, she was promoted from Major to Lt. Colonel, and then in December 2018 to full Colonel.

In the British Army, Giles served on operations in Sierra Leone, East Timor, Bosnia, Iraq, Northern Ireland, and Afghanistan. Soon after a tour of Northern Ireland, she took a short maternity leave, and within a year became the first woman given command of 47 Air Despatch Squadron, a unit transporting supplies by air to British troops around the world. In January 2016, she was appointed as college commander at Sandhurst, commanding New College, where Officer Cadets spend the second and third terms of their three-term Commissioning Course. This was not the post of Commandant of Sandhurst, at the time held by Major General Paul Nanson.

From 2019 to 2022, Giles was President of the Army Officer Selection Board at Westbury, Wiltshire.

On 1 January 2025, Giles became Colonel Commandant of the Royal Logistic Corps. She retired from the army as a Colonel on 5 January 2026.

== Personal life ==
In 1998, Giles married a Royal Artillery officer, Nicholas Pond, now a retired Brigadier. They have a son and a daughter.

== Honours ==
- 2017: Honorary degree, University of Exeter
- 1 August 2021: Honorary Colonel of the Exeter University Officers Training Corps (succeeding Lieutenant-General Sir Christopher Tickell)
- 2024 New Year Honours: Commander of the Order of the British Empire (Military Division).
