= Paul Boyle =

British geographer (born 1964)

Paul Boyle CBE FRSE FBA
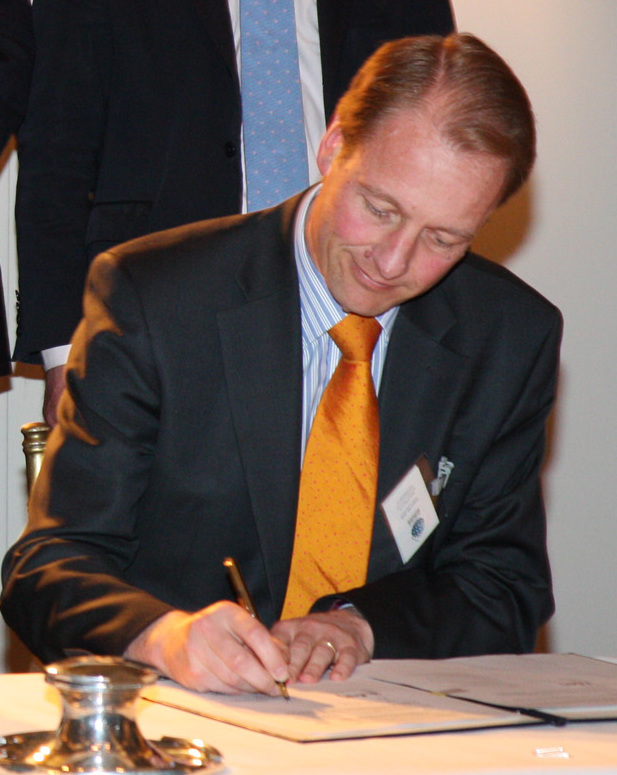
- Professor Paul Boyle in 2012

Vice-Chancellor of Swansea University
- Incumbent
- Assumed office March 2019
- Preceded by: Richard B. Davies

Vice-Chancellor of the University of Leicester
- In office 2014–2019
- Preceded by: Sir Robert Burgess
- Succeeded by: Nishan Canagarajah

Personal details
- Born: 16 November 1964 (age 61)
- Education: Lancaster University; University of Colorado
- Salary: £312,000 (2021–22)

Paul Joseph Boyle, CBE, FRSE, FBA, FRSGS, FLSW (born 16 November 1964) is a British geographer, academic, and academic administrator. He was the vice-chancellor of the University of Leicester between 2014 and 2019. He had been Professor of Human Geography at the University of St Andrews from 1999 to 2014, and Chief Executive of the Economic and Social Research Council (ESRC) from 2010 to 2014. He took over as vice-chancellor of Swansea University at the end of the 2018/2019 academic year.

== Honours ==
In 2006, Boyle was elected a Fellow of the Royal Society of Edinburgh (FRSE). In 2013, he was elected a Fellow of the British Academy (FBA), the United Kingdom's national academy for the social sciences and humanities. In the 2016 New Year Honours, he was appointed a Commander of the Order of the British Empire (CBE) "for services to social science".

In 2022, Boyle was elected a Fellow of the Learned Society of Wales.

== Selected works ==
- Boyle, Paul; Halfacree, Keith, eds. (2002). Migration and Gender in the Developed World. London: Routledge. ISBN 978-1-134-69513-3.
- Boyle, Paul; Halfacree, Keith H.; Robinson, Vaughan (2014). Exploring Contemporary Migration. London: Routledge. ISBN 978-1-317-89087-4.

Academic offices
Preceded by Richard B. Davies	Vice-Chancellor of Swansea University; 2019–Present	Incumbent
Preceded by Sir Robert Burgess	Vice-Chancellor of the University of Leicester; 2014–2019	Succeeded by Nishan Canagarajah
