= Nishan Canagarajah =

British Tamil academic (born 1966)

Sir Nishan Canagarajah
- நிஷான் கனகராஜா

Vice Chancellor of the University of Leicester
- Incumbent
- Assumed office November 2019
- Preceded by: Paul Boyle

Personal details
- Born: Cedric Nishanthan Canagarajah; 1966 (age 59–60) Sri Lanka
- Education: Christ's College, Cambridge (BA, MA, PhD)

Sir Cedric Nishanthan Canagarajah (born 1966) is a Sri Lankan-British academic and the current president and vice-chancellor of the University of Leicester. He was previously one of the pro-vice-chancellors of the University of Bristol.

== Early life ==
Canagarajah was born in 1966 in Sri Lanka. His mother was a teacher. He was educated at St. John's College, Jaffna. He was the Head Prefect of the college in the year 1985 and also excelled in sports such as cricket, football, volleyball, and hockey. After school he joined Christ's College, Cambridge from where he received a B.A. honours degree in electronics and information sciences in 1989 and a Ph.D. in digital signal processing in 1993.

== Career ==
Canagarajah joined the University of Bristol in 1993 as a research assistant. He was promoted to lecturer in 1994, senior lecturer in 1999 and reader in 2001. He became professor of multimedia signal processing in 2004. He was promoted to research director at the university's Faculty of Engineering in 2006 and head of Department of Computer Science in 2009. He became head of Merchant Venturers School of Engineering in 2010 before becoming dean of the Faculty of Engineering in 2011. He was appointed pro-vice-chancellor for research and enterprise in August 2014. In August 2019 it was announced that he would become president and vice-chancellor of the University of Leicester in November 2019.

Canagarajah's research contributions in image segmentation and texture classification are internationally recognized and his research on audio signal processing led to an interactive exhibit, Virtual Drum, at the London Science Museum. He has led a number of successful international research partnerships and is currently theme leader for the joint £5M EPSRC/DST collaborative programme on next generation telecommunications systems and services, which includes a number of UK and Indian universities and industrial partners.

Canagarajah has served on a number of national and international panels on research funding, governance and postgraduate education. He acted as a technical consultant for several industrial partners including Sony, BT, BBC, Orange, Thales, Toshiba and the Metropolitan Police Service. He is part of the Universities UK advisory group to tackle racial harassment in higher education.

In January 2021, members of the Leicester University and College Union voted overwhelmingly in support of a motion of no confidence against Canagarajah, in response to a proposed mass lay-off of faculty members. In March 2021, students at Leicester also approved a vote of no confidence against Canagarajah, with 1010 votes for the proposal and only 82 opposed. In December 2025, another motion of no confidence in Canagarajah was passed by the Leicester University and College Union in response to more proposed job cuts, with 96.2% voting in favour and 3.8% opposed.

== Personal life ==
Canagarajah is married to Thabitha. They have a daughter and two sons.

Canagarajah was knighted in the 2026 New Year Honours for services to higher education. On 7 July 2026, he received the honour from King Charles III at an investiture ceremony held at Windsor Castle.
