= Robert Burgess (sociologist) =

British sociologist (1947–2022)

Sir Robert Burgess
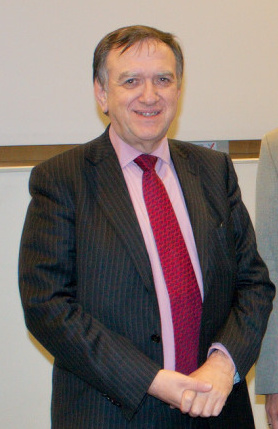
- Burgess at Thomas Erlebach's inaugural lecture on 2 December 2008
- Born: Robert George Burgess; 23 April 1947
- Died: 21 February 2022 (aged 74)
- Education: University of Warwick (PhD, 1981); University of Durham, (BA, 1971)
- Spouse: Hilary Joyce (m. 1974)

Sir Robert George Burgess DL, FAcSS (23 April 1947 – 21 February 2022) was a British sociologist and academic. He was appointed Vice-Chancellor of the University of Leicester in 1999, succeeding Ken Edwards. He was President of the British Sociological Association 1989–1991 and chair of the board of GSM London.

== Early life ==
Burgess was born in Sturminster in Dorset on 23 April 1947. He grew up Somerset, and attended the King Arthur's School in Wincanton, from 1958. He taught for a year at Bennett Memorial Diocesan School, a church school, in Tunbridge Wells in Kent.

Burgess received his BA degree from the University of Durham in 1971 and his PhD degree from the University of Warwick in 1981.

== Career ==
Burgess remained at Warwick as a lecturer and became Professor of Sociology in 1987. He then rose through the ranks, serving as Senior Pro-Vice-Chancellor 1995–99. Burgess then moved to the University of Leicester as Vice-Chancellor, introducing sweeping changes that enhanced the university's reputation and saw it enter the top-20 institutions in many league tables.

Burgess was chair of the Universities and Colleges Admissions Service (UCAS) 2005–11, the Research Information Network 2005–11, and is the chair of the UUK/Guild HE Teacher Education Advisory Group. In 2007, Burgess chaired the steering group that produced the Burgess Report, calling for sweeping changes in university degree classification that would replace the established system of first- and second class degrees.

Burgess retired from the post of Vice-Chancellor in September 2014, at age 67. He was succeeded by Professor Paul Boyle.

== Personal life ==
Burgess was knighted in the 2010 New Year Honours. He became an Academician of the Social Sciences in 2000. He received an Honorary DLitt degree from the University of Staffordshire in 1998 and a DUniv degree from the University of Northampton in 2007.

Burgess married Hilary Margaret Mary Joyce in 1974 and lists his recreations as walking, music and "some gardening". Sir Bob and Lady Burgess lived at Knighton Hall, the University of Leicester's traditional vice-chancellor's residence in Knighton, Leicester. Burgess's record in building both the university's academic reputation and its campus buildings earned him the nickname Bob the Builder among his university colleagues.

Burgess died on 21 February 2022, at the age of 74.

Academic offices
Preceded by Jennifer Platt	President of the British Sociological Association; 1989–1991	Succeeded by John Westergaard
Preceded by Ken Edwards	Vice-Chancellor of the University of Leicester; 1999–2014	Succeeded by Paul Boyle
