= Abbey104 =

Coordinates: 50.9528°N 2.5232°W

Abbey 104
- Sherborne; England
- Broadcast area: Sherborne, Yeovil, West Dorset, South Somerset
- Frequencies: 104.7 MHz and online

History
- First air date: 16 February 2013

Links
- Website: abbey104.com

Abbey 104 (formerly known as Radio Sherborne) is a community radio station broadcasting on 104.7 FM to Sherborne and the surrounding areas in Dorset and Somerset in the United Kingdom. The studio is located at 118 Yeovil Road, Sherborne, DT9 4BB since August 2024 and was previously housed in The Coombe, Sherborne.

== History ==
The station was originally known as Radio Sherborne broadcasting on 87.5 FM (on an restricted service licence) and online. Radio Sherborne was later rebranded as Abbey 104 in February 2013, broadcasting on 104.7 FM.

The idea of a local radio station for Sherborne was brought up in 2010 by Chris Tucker. He felt that the local community was neglected by broadcasters such as the BBC and commercial stations. This was most apparent in winter 2009-2010, where the area found itself in a news black spot for local weather and travel reports.

The station is proposed as a way to bring community views, news and music to people of the town and surrounding areas.

In 2010, the station received a National Lottery grant of £9,000 which helped towards start-up costs. The station is well supported and sponsored by local traders in the area.

Oliver Letwin, a local MP, was invited to the official launch at the Eastbury Hotel, Sherborne along with representatives of the local Lions Club and Rotary Club.

Abbey 104's 1st birthday broadcasting on 104.7 FM was celebrated with a special outside broadcast at Sainsbury's in Sherborne.

At the end of March 2014, Abbey104 ceased broadcasting from Georgian House, Greenhill, Sherborne, and moved to temporary studio premises at the Mermaid Pub in Sherborne, whilst the new studio was prepared at Coombe Works, Coombe, Sherborne.

In April 2014, the studios were moved from the temporary premises at the Mermaid and commenced at Coombe Works where the station broadcast from until August 2024.

Since April 2022 the station has been run by John Shearing as chairman with Robert Ford treasurer, and Susan Hill secretary. Other directors, Taff Martin and Kevin Gould resigned as directors in 2023. Abbey 104 has gone from strength to strength over the last three years and is becoming a much needed part of the community.

In February 2018, Abbey 104 was given a new five-year extension to its licence, committing the station to serve the local community for the foreseeable future with a collection of old and new hits. The licence was again renewed in 2023 for a further five years. The station celebrated 10 years of broadcasting with a party at Mill Farm with current and former presenters and the station's business partners taking part.

Presenters on Abbey 104 include programme controller Phil Clements, with a Charts Show, Bob Ford Folk and Roots Show, John Shearing's The Unlimited Music Show and The Retro Rock Show, and many more. Community-centred shows include The Countryside Matters, The BV Magazine podcast and Legally Speaking which offers legal and financial tips from Mogers Drewett Solicitors and Financial Planners.

In February 2024, Abbey 104 was unexpectedly given six months' notice to quit its home for over 10 years in The Coombe, Sherborne, as the whole site was being sold. New premises were eventually found at 118 Yeovil Road, Sherborne and the work began to convert the building into a working studio with appropriate soundproofing, lighting and heating. Local businesses, Abbey 104 members, and members of the public responded to the station's request for support, and donated funds, items needed and labour. Everyone at Abbey 104 is hugely grateful to all those who helped relocate to the new studio. It could not have been done without them. The station continued to broadcast during the eight weeks or so of refurbishment and launched from the new studio in August 2024.

== Transmission ==
The main frequency for Abbey104 is on 104.7 MHz FM and emits 25 watts from a transmitter located at [Sherborne Golf Club], Sherborne. A STL is used to communicate between the studio at 118 Yeovil Road, Sherborne, to the transmitter site. The station broadcast range is approximately 12-15 mile radius around Sherborne. This includes Wincanton to the north and Cerne Abbas to the south, towards Martock to the west and Shaftesbury to the east.
