= South West Coaches =

British bus operating company

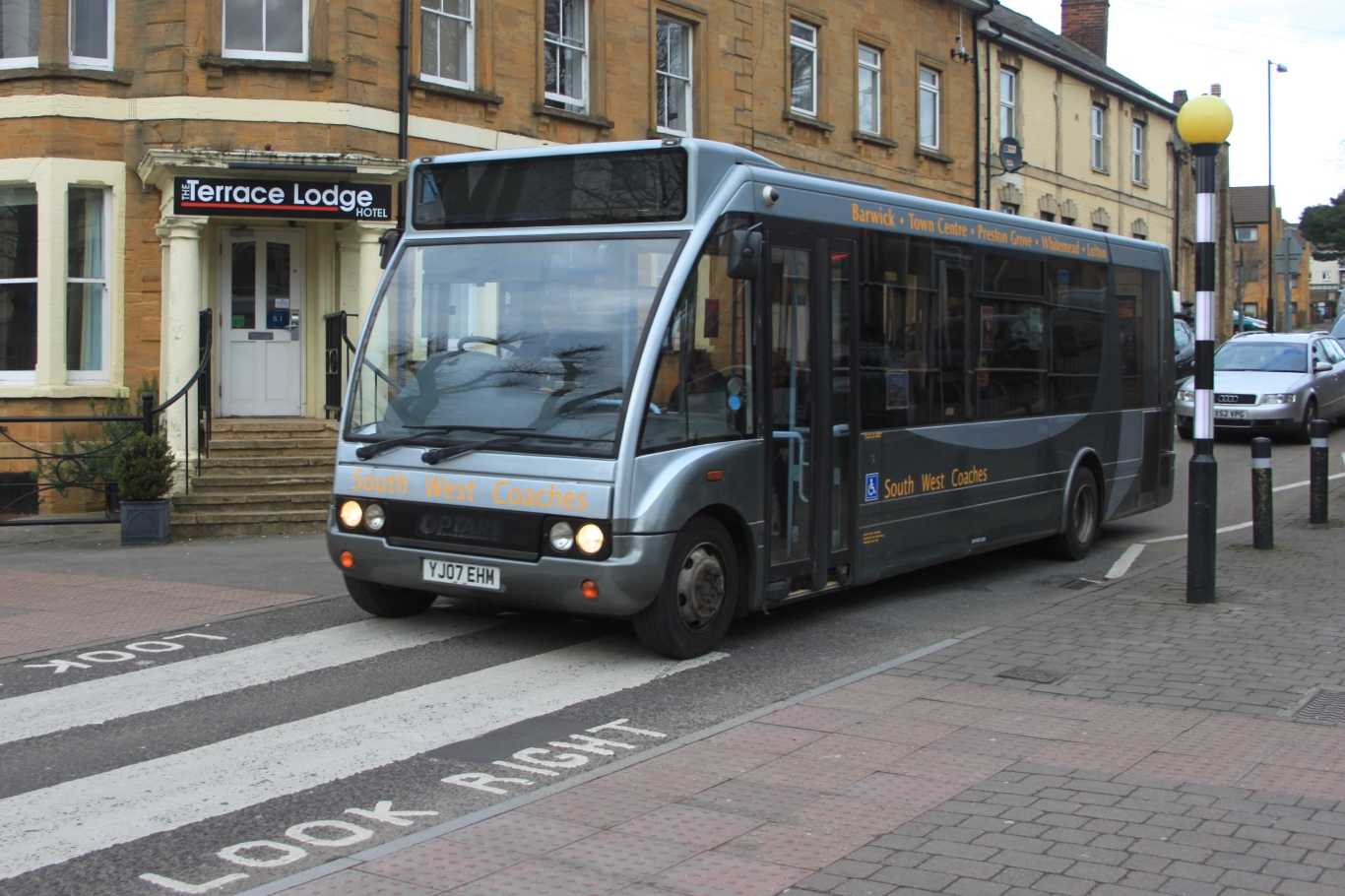
- Optare Solo M880SL in Yeovil in February 2016
- Parent: Alan Graham
- Founded: 2000
- Headquarters: Southgate Road, Wincanton BA9 9EB
- Service area: Dorset; Somerset; Wiltshire
- Service type: Bus & coach services
- Hubs: Yeovil; Isle of Portland
- Fleet: 70 (February 2021)
- Website: www.southwestcoaches.co.uk

South West Coaches is a privately owned bus company that operates services around Dorset, Somerset, and Wiltshire, in South West England.

== History ==
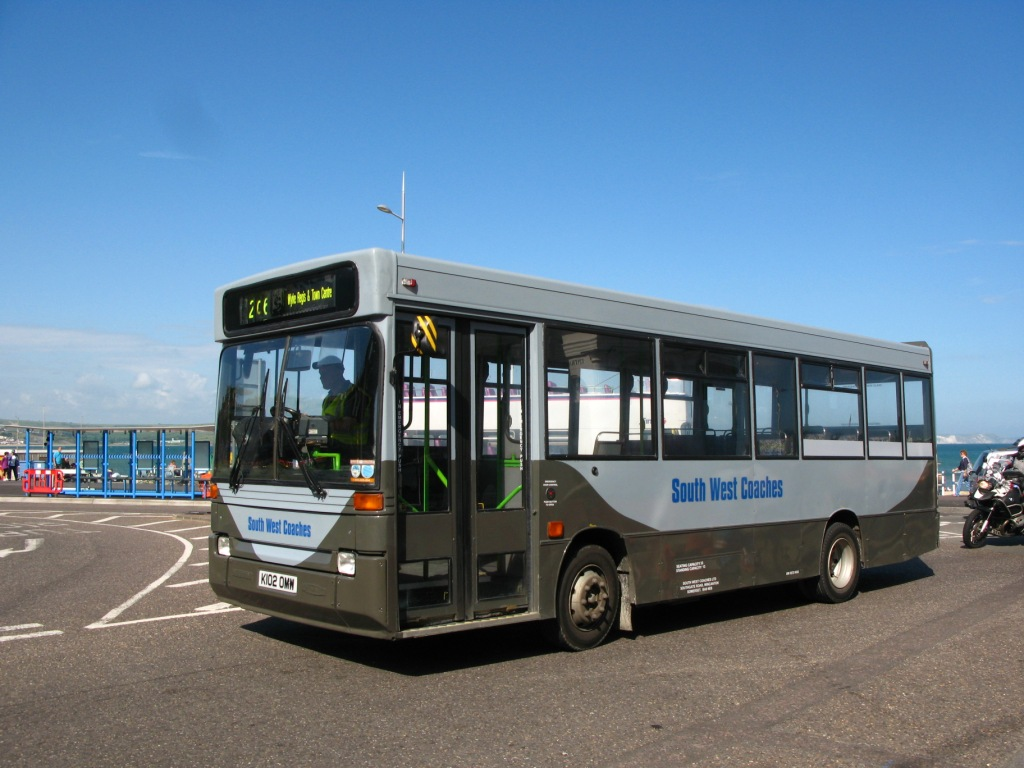
Dennis Dart in Weymouth, July 2011

Reggie Wake started bus services from South Barrow in February 1930. Business expanded during World War II and the main base was moved to nearby Sparkford. A trunk route from Yeovil to Castle Cary and Shepton Mallet was started in 1947 and operated by double-decker buses from 1949 until 1968. Several other operators were taken over which led to setting up a second depot in Wincanton. In 1964 it became a limited company, Wakes Services Limited. By 1979 some of the smaller services had been withdrawn but the Yeovil-Shepton mallet service continued. At this time 4 buses and 21 coaches were in use. Bus deregulation in the 1980s encouraged further growth of the network to places such as Taunton, Frome and Bridport in Doreset. In 1996 the fleet had 35 vehicles. The Wake family sold the business in 1999 to AG Hulbert & Son of Yeovil and the combined business branded as South West Coaches.

In April 2008, Safeway Services of South Petherton was purchased, followed in October 2009 by Sureline on the Isle of Portland.

=== Sureline ===
Sureline
- Founded: 2002
- Headquarters: Unit 17, Tradecroft Industrial Estate, Isle of Portland, Dorset
- Service area: United Kingdom
- Service type: Urban bus services
- Destinations: Isle of Portland, Weymouth, Dorchester, Bridport, Yeovil
- Fleet: 15

Sureline was a bus operator based in the Isle of Portland, Dorset, on the south coast of England. It operated from Portland through Weymouth to Dorchester. Formed in 2002, Sureline became defunct in 2009 and was taken over by South West Coaches.

Sureline was established in 2002 by David Beaman and Bill Landucci. Operations began on 24 August that year with a service running between Portland and Dorchester on weekdays only. Sureline was initially based at Southwell Business Park but relocated to Tradecroft Industrial Estate, near the village of Easton, in July 2003. They first began operating with a fleet of eight Mercedes 709 buses. By early 2003, four more buses of the same type had been acquired with seven used for daily services. Sureline's operations extended from 2003 with new routes and timetables, including an extension to Portland Bill. In 2004, the fleet was increased with the arrival of two Dennis Dart buses, while one of the 709s were scrapped.

While local services continued to evolve and expand, in September 2005, Sureline also began two services from Dorchester to Yeovil. One went via Maiden Newton and Cattistock, while the other went via Cerne Abbas and Sherborne. 2006 saw the opening of the operator's new maintenance facility at Southwell Business Park. By this time, Sureline was employing approximately thirty drivers and had a peak vehicle requirement of fourteen. Some service reduction was seen in 2007, including a reduction of Saturday operations on the main Portland to Dorchester route. Weekend operations of the two Yeovil routes were transferred to Nordcat of Sturminster Newton. The timetable changes continued into 2008 and 2009; the 212 and X37 services from Dorchester to Yeovil were amended to run on schooldays only, while more focus was given to the X10 and X20 routes in the Weymouth to Dorchester sector. This resulted in a much reduced service to and from Portland, despite being the operator's base.

On 26 October 2009, Sureline was taken over by South West Coaches of Wincanton, who were also the successors to the long-established Wakes of Sparkford and Wincanton. Both Sureline founders, Beaman and Landucci, left the company. To date, the new operators continue many of the services that were provided by Sureline including the original route on Portland. Speaking to the Dorset Echo, Beaman claimed the decision to sell Sureline was made to "safeguard its future", while he also blamed increasing government regulation for small bus firm, resulting in increased difficulty to generate profit.

== Operations ==
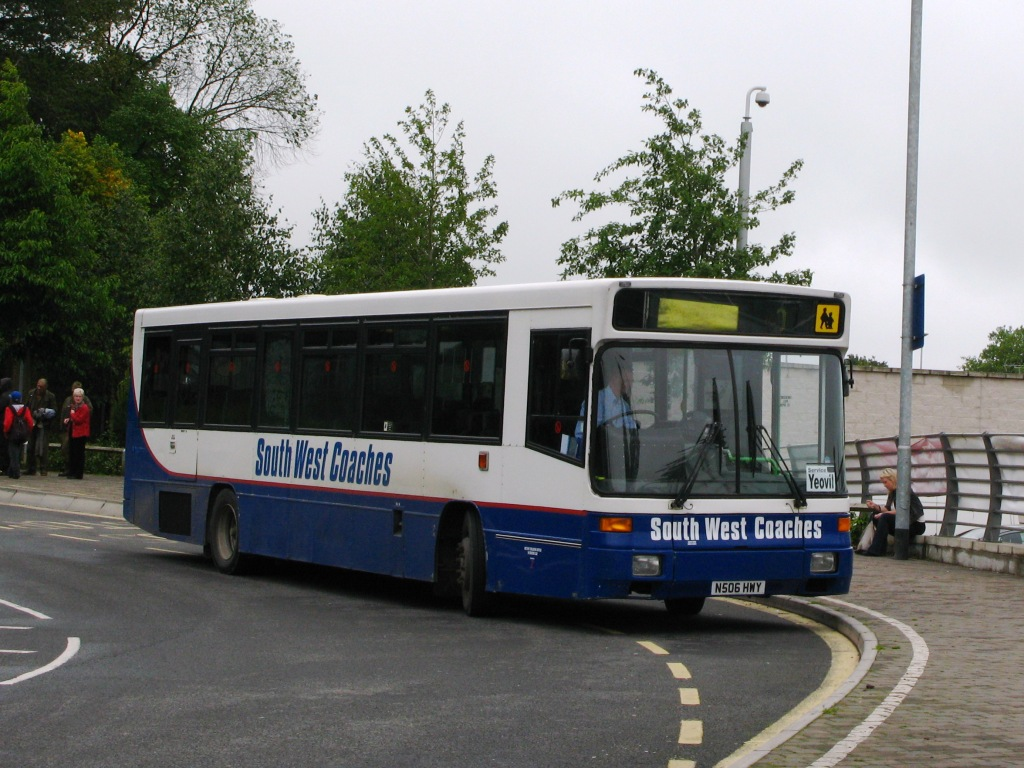
SWC Volvo B10B, Shepton Mallet, 2011

Logo used from 2008 to 2015

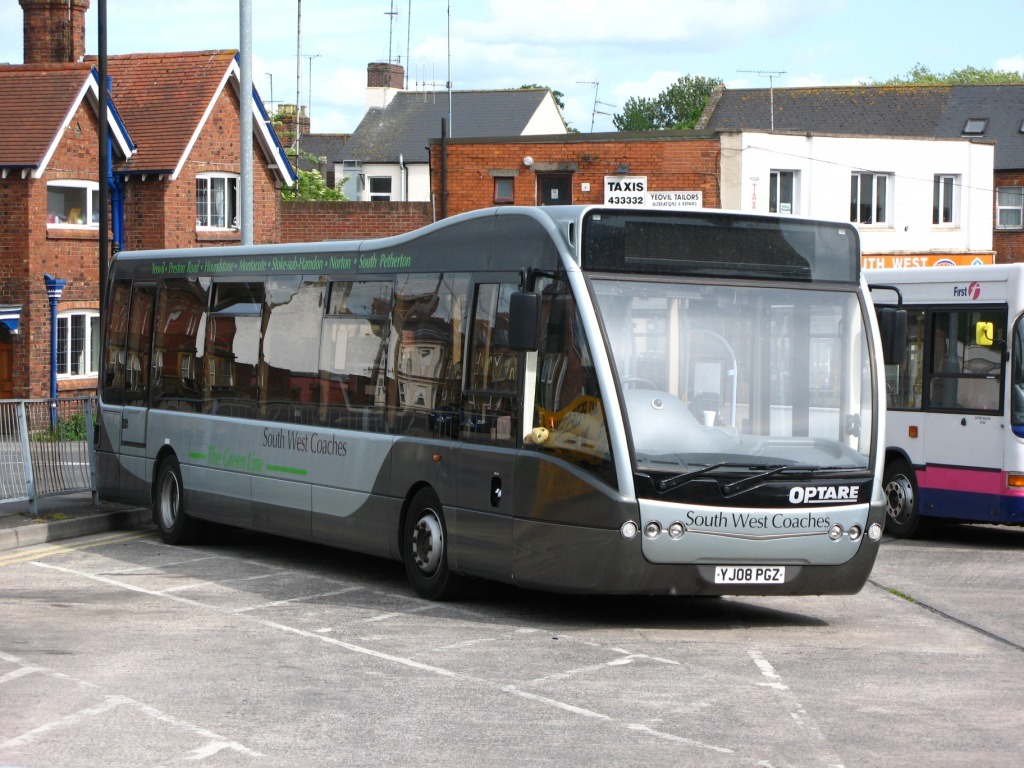
SWC Optare Versa in Yeovil, 2011

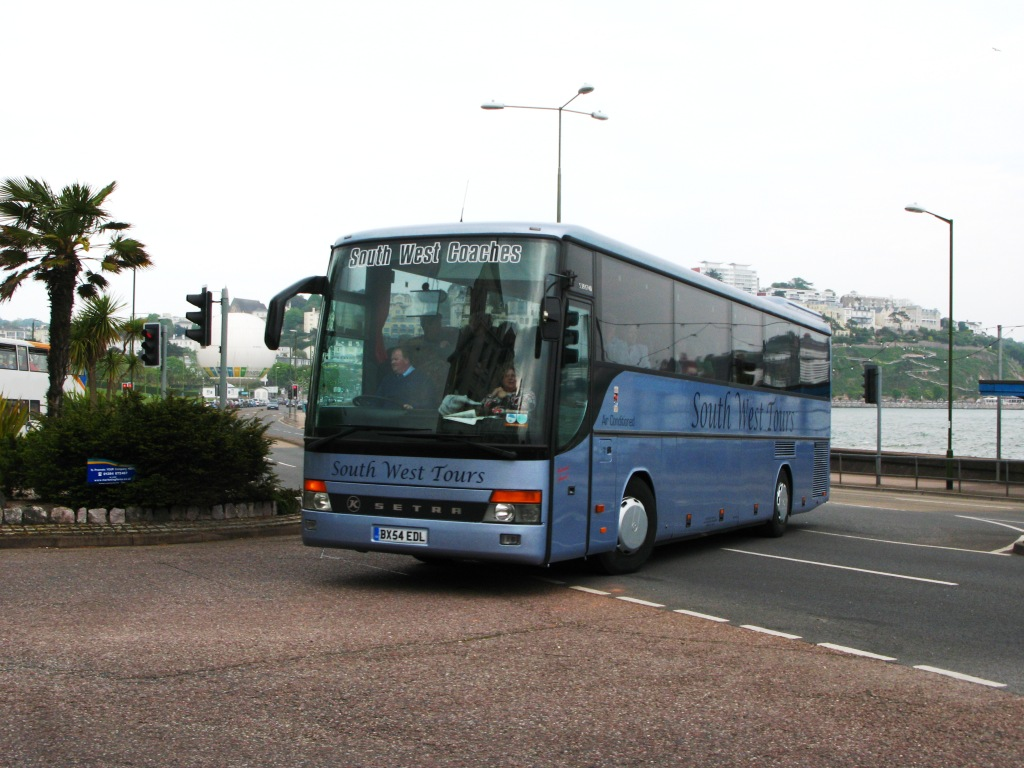
Setra S315GT-HD in Torquay in May 2011

South West Coaches have little competition in their operating area since another independent operator, Nippy Bus, with its N10 route competing with South West Coaches' route 81, ceased operations in 2017. First Hampshire & Dorset still competes on the Portland routes. In most villages, South West Coaches is the sole bus operator, so that public transport users are heavily reliant on its services. The geographical area covered stretches from Minehead and Taunton in the west to Salisbury in the east and from the Isle of Portland and Bournemouth in the south to Warminster and Frome in the north.

The company operates local town services in Yeovil under contract to Somerset County Council, ex Sureline routes in Dorchester, Weymouth and on the Isle of Portland. A large proportion of its work is coach trips as well as private hire and school contracts. In Somerset, South West Coaches is the leading provider of infrequent services. In Dorset, it provides many school services for Dorset Council.

In July 2017, the company began to operate a Shaftesbury to Gillingham service. In October 2017, after First Dorset had ended its service from Wyke Regis to Weymouth, South West Coaches agreed to a local request to take over the route. In November 2017, with the unexpected closure of Nippy Bus, South West Coaches took over providing transport services to Strode College. On an evening in March 2018, a South West Coaches bus travelling through Chard had windows smashed by projectiles thrown by boys aged about 10 to 13.

== Depots ==
There are three Depots in Somerset, at Wincanton, Yeovil, and West Pennard, and one in Dorset, in the Isle of Portland.

== Fleet ==
As at February 2021, the fleet consisted of some seventy buses and minibuses.

== Routes ==
- Service 1 - Yeovil | Castle Cary | Shepton Mallet
- Service 11 - Yeovil | Houndstone | Abbey Manor
- Service 52 - Yeovil | Martock | Bower Hinton
- Service 58 - Gillingham | Zeals | Mere
- Service 81 - Yeovil | Montacute | South Petherton
- Service 96/96A - Yeovil | Crewkerne | Chard
- Service 200 - Weymouth | Weymouth Bay Holiday Park | Haven Holiday Park (seasonal)
- Service 646 - Charlton Horethorne | Wincanton | Street Strode College
- Service 647 - Gillingham | Wincanton | Street Strode College
- Service 652 - Odcombe | Martock | Street Strode College
- Service 667 - Street | Castle Cary | Wincanton
- Service CR2 - Gillingham | Shaftesbury
  - Service CR2M - Gillingham | Motcombe | Shaftesbury
- Service CR3 - Gillingham | Marnhull | Sturminster Newton
- Service CR5/CR5A - Yeovil | Sherborne | Dorchester

== See also ==
- List of bus operators of the United Kingdom
