= King Arthur's School =

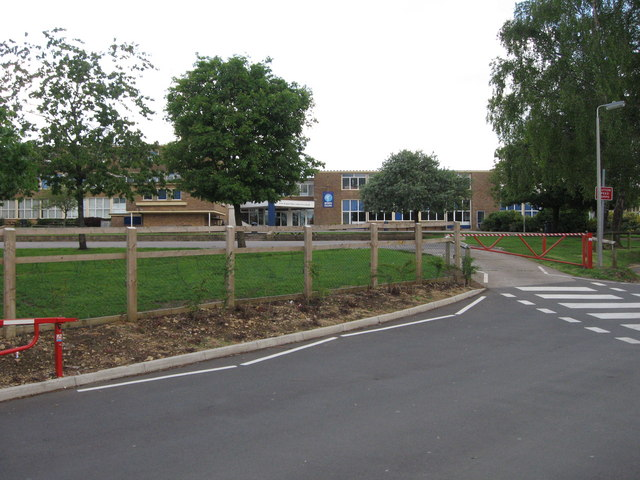

Location
- West Hill; Wincanton, Somerset, BA9 9BX; England
- Coordinates: 51.0564°N 2.4218°W

Information
- Type: Academy
- Established: 1958; 68 years ago
- Local authority: Somerset County Council
- Trust: Sherborne Area Schools' Trust
- Department for Education URN: 147016 Tables
- Ofsted: Reports
- Head: Jonty Archibald
- Gender: Coeducational
- Age: 11 to 16
- Enrolment: 350
- Website: www.kingarthurs.org.uk

King Arthur's School is a smaller than average secondary school in Wincanton, Somerset, England. It had 350 students between the ages of 11 and 16 in 2017. Before April 2019 it was called King Arthur's Community School.

== Description ==
The campus includes the Wincanton Community Sports Centre and West Hill Nursery. The logo is linked to the Arthurian story of Excalibur, which is also the name of the school magazine.

In 2017 the community school was rated as inadequate by Ofsted. At the end of 2017 the head teacher left amid speculation about a merger with Ansford Academy.

The school was assisted to restructure by staff from The Gryphon School Sherborne, and in April 2019 formally joined the Sherbourne Area Schools' Trust (SAST). SAST was established in June 2017 with seven schools serving the west and north Dorset area, as well as students from south Somerset.

=== Academics ===
The school had been criticised for its poor performance: its poor, “ineffective” governance, and lack of support for children with special educational needs. Teachers' expectations of what pupils can achieve had been too low. To change this the SMT is working with SAST and has in place new procedures.

Secondary education in the United Kingdom is compulsory until the age of 16. It is divided into two key stages of three and two years, or two and three. Students must study the National Curriculum. In King Arthur's School, Key Stage 3 lasts three years, Year 7, 8, 9. SAST encourages the EBacc qualification: Core subjects are English and Maths, EBacc subjects are Science, Geography, History or French. Creative Subjects, Art, PE etc. make up the rest of the timetable.

In Key Stage 4, that is years 10 and 11, this continues, but with a different time emphasis. The Core remains the same, and the language drops from being compulsory to being one of a wider pool of options. There is no 6th form

== Notable alumni ==
Alumni include Professor Sir Robert Burgess, formerly Vice Chancellor of Leicester University; and Lieutenant Colonel Lucy Giles, the first female Commander at Royal Military Academy Sandhurst.
