= Redlynch, Somerset =

Village in Somerset, England

Coordinates: 51.100°N 2.422°W

Redlynch
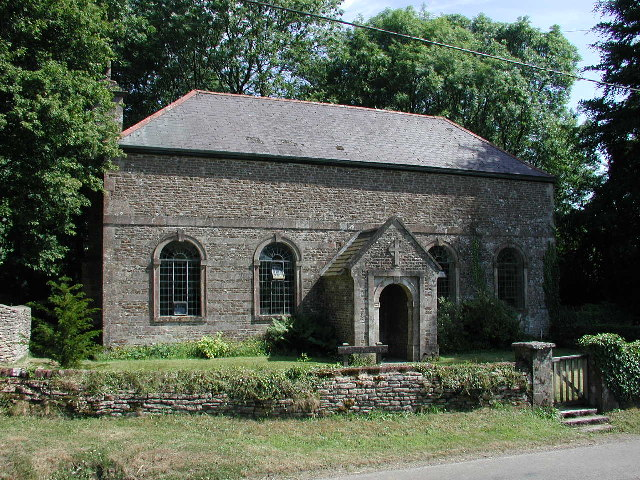
- St Peter's Church, built by Stephen Fox-Strangways, 1st Earl of Ilchester (1704–1776)

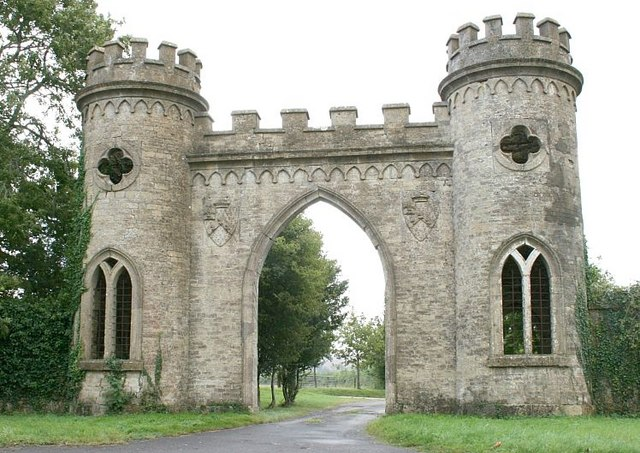
- "The Towers", displaying the arms of Fox

- Location within Somerset
- OS grid reference: ST705335
- Civil parish: Bruton
- Unitary authority: Somerset Council
- Ceremonial county: Somerset
- Region: South West
- Country: England
- Sovereign state: United Kingdom
- Post town: BRUTON
- Postcode district: BA10
- Dialling code: 01749
- Police: Avon and Somerset
- Fire: Devon and Somerset
- Ambulance: South Western
- UK Parliament: Glastonbury and Somerton

Redlynch is a village and former manor in the civil parish of Bruton, in Somerset, England. The 18th-century church and a folly named The Towers are of architectural interest.

== History ==
=== Ownership ===
In the mid-12th century, the manor of Redlynch was held by Henry Lovel (died 1194) of Castle Cary. It was later part of the hundred of Bruton.

In the late 14th century it was acquired by James FitzJames (died c. 1391), whose great-grandson, Sir John FitzJames (died c. 1542), Chief Justice of the King's Bench, is recorded in 1538 as having a house at Redlynch which included a "great chamber over a parlour". He was succeeded by his cousin Sir Nicholas FitzJames, who made improvements to the house. Sir Nicholas's heir was his nephew John FitzJames, who in 1617 sold the estate to Sir Robert Gorges of Bristol.

In 1617, Gorges purchased the estate from John FitzJames. Helena Snakenborg, a lady-in-waiting to Queen Elizabeth I and widow successively of William Parr, Marquess of Northampton, and of Gorges, died at the age of 86 on 10 April 1635 at Redlynch, then the residence of her son, Sir Robert Gorges. She was buried on 14 May in Salisbury Cathedral. In 1672, the Gorges family conveyed the estate to Sir Stephen Fox (1627–1716) in settlement of a debt.

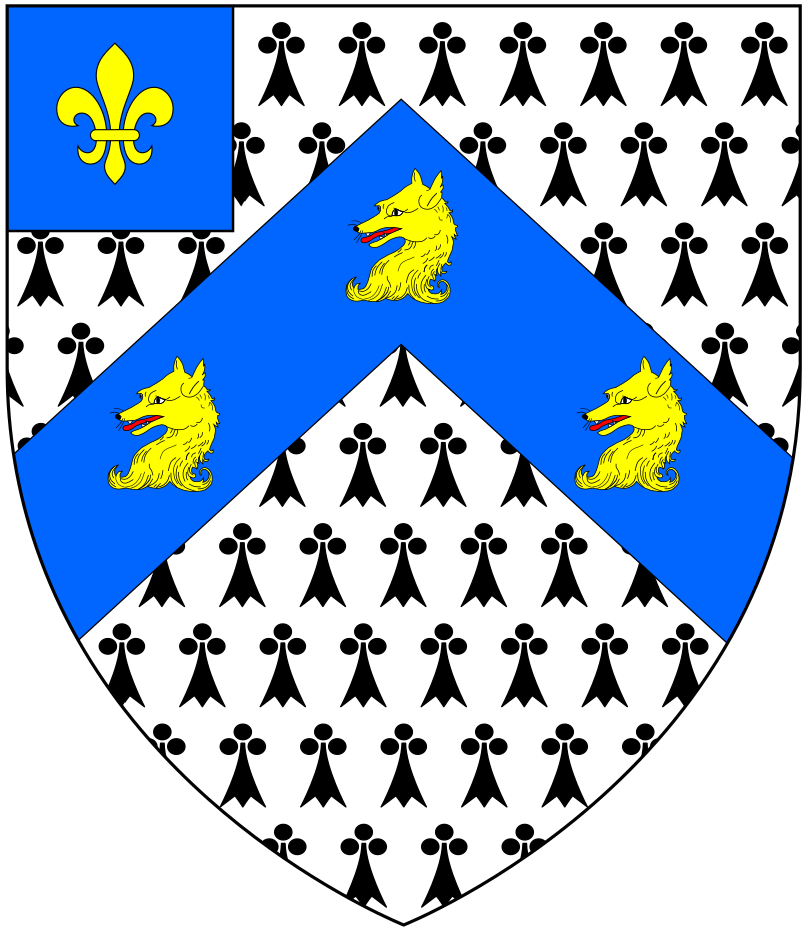
Canting arms of Fox: Ermine, on a chevron azure three fox's heads and necks erased or on a canton of the second a fleur-de-lys of the third

Having acquired what was by then a large 16th-century manor house in 1672, Sir Stephen Fox, paymaster-general to King Charles II, commenced repairs on it in 1688. In 1708/09 he began building a new house adjacent to the old one, to designs by the architect Thomas Fort. He also laid out formal gardens.

The estate descended to Fox's eldest son Stephen Fox-Strangways, 1st Earl of Ilchester (1704–1776), who in the first half of the 18th century built the east wing of the house to the design of Nathaniel Ireson of Wincanton. He also expanded the park and installed decorative features such as a lake, a waterfall, a temple, a Chinese seat and a bird house. In 1755, Ilchester added a Gothic-style entrance gate on the west side, designed by Henry Flitcroft. King George III was a visitor to Redlynch on his way to Weymouth.

Henry Fox-Strangways, 2nd Earl of Ilchester (1747–1802) transferred his principal seat to Melbury House in Dorset, but information about the Ilchester household at Redlynch survives in the published diaries and correspondence of Agnes Porter, a Scottish-born governess to his many daughters from 1784 to 1797. The Redlynch estate suffered from neglect, but in the 1790s, he planned to convert the deer park to agricultural use, which was accomplished by his son Henry Fox-Strangways, 3rd Earl of Ilchester (1787–1858). In 1851, part of the house was in use as a farmhouse.

In 1901, the 5th Earl of Ilchester (1847–1905), still seated at Melbury, converted the service block into his principal residence on the estate, to the designs of Sir Edwin Lutyens. The west block was previously the stable. Within the grounds were an orangery, summerhouse, and a walled kitchen garden.

=== Speculators and wartime use ===
In 1912 the estate was sold by Giles Fox-Strangways, 6th Earl of Ilchester (1874–1959) to the Cavendish Land Company, which in turn sold it on to a series of speculators. The new residence converted by the 5th Earl was partly destroyed by a fire in 1914 caused by suffragettes. This was later rebuilt, but at the same time the main part of the first Earl's mansion was demolished.

In 1935 it was purchased by Margaret Howard, Countess of Suffolk (1879 – 1967), widow of Henry Howard, 19th Earl of Suffolk, 12th Earl of Berkshire (1877–1917), and sister-in-law of Lord Curzon, who lived there until her death. During World War II the United States Army 3rd Armored Division (spearhead) was based at Redlynch Park. Remnants of the entrance bunker survive, marked with an inscribed plaque thanking the local people.

=== Heritage at risk ===
Redlynch served as a school between about 1971 and 1982, but in 1985 the house and stables were split into flats, and the orangery sold for use as a separate house.

The surviving folly known as The Towers, displaying the arms of the Fox family, features on the Heritage at Risk Register kept by English Heritage, as does the whole park.

== Church of St Peter ==
Redlynch parish Church of St Peter, dating from 1750, was erected by the 1st Earl to designs by Nathaniel Ireson of Wincanton. It has been designated by English Heritage as a Grade II* listed building.

== Notable residents ==
From March to October 1959, American author John Steinbeck (1902–1968) and his wife Elaine rented a cottage in the hamlet of Discove, Redlynch, while Steinbeck researched his retelling of the Arthurian legend. Glastonbury Tor was visible from the cottage, and Steinbeck also visited the nearby hillfort of Cadbury Castle, a supposed site of King Arthur's court of Camelot. The unfinished manuscript appeared after his death in 1976 as The Acts of King Arthur and His Noble Knights. The Steinbecks called the time spent in Somerset the happiest of their life together.
