= Foster's School =

School in Dorset, England

Foster's Grammar School for Boys, Sherborne, Dorset, was founded by Richard Foster in 1640. It closed on 31 August 1992.

== History ==
Foster's School was initially endowed by Richard Foster from rent collected at Foster's Farm at Boy's Hill in the parish of Haydon. The students were to be inhabitants of Sherborne and between the ages of seven and eleven at the time of their enrollment. It was known as the Blue School, a common name for charity schools in which the students wore blue coats. In addition to the blue coat, the boys were issued a bonnet (headgear), two shirts, two cravats, two pair of stockings and two pair of shoes each year. Foster died prior to the school's first term in 1687.

The typical school day lasted from 8 am to 11 am, with a break to go home for lunch, and then schooling resumed from 1 pm until 5 pm in the summer and 4 pm in the winter, Monday through Friday. On Sundays, the boys were required to attend services and bible study from 8 am to 1 pm.

Richard Foster had also directed that funds from his estate go toward the education of "ten poor maids of the town of Sherborne". However it was not until 1738 when girls were enrolled in classes, leading to the founding of Lord Digby's School in 1747.

By 1939, a new building had been provided at Tinney's Lane to educate 150 boys with the old school buildings in Hound Street being retained as a small boarding house and headmaster's residence. The school worked closely with the girls' grammar school, Lord Digby's, and in later years each school provided distinct areas of expertise and adopted a co-educational approach for pupils from both schools for "A" level studies. Although both schools were small, educational standards were high.

In 1987, it was announced that both Foster's School and Lord Digby's School would be closed and incorporated into a comprehensive with St Aldhelm's school.

In 1992, the schools were closed and a new school, The Gryphon School, was created on the site of the old St Aldhelm's. The Foster's site at Tinney's Lane and all of the property associated with the school were sold off for housing development, the school being commemorated by the naming of the main estate as "Foster's Field".

== See also ==
- Category:People educated at Foster's School
