= Nippy Bus =

British bus operating company

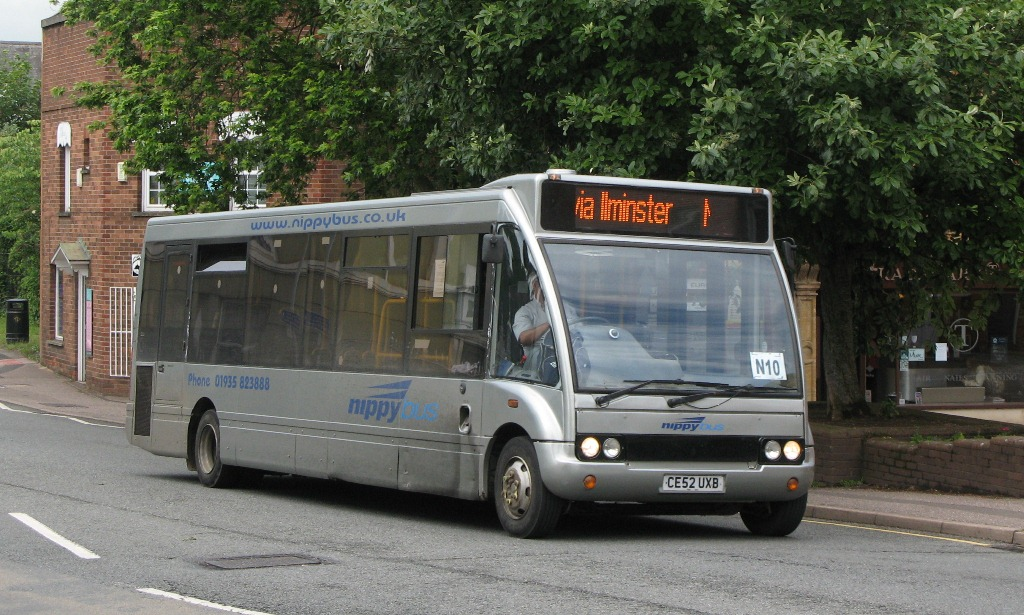
- Optare Solo in Taunton in June 2013
- Parent: Syd Hardy
- Founded: September 2004
- Ceased operation: 29 October 2017
- Headquarters: Martock
- Service area: Somerset
- Service type: Bus & coach services
- Routes: 13 (October 2013)
- Hubs: Yeovil
- Operator: Sydney Hardy
- Website: www.nippybus.co.uk

Nippy Bus was a privately owned bus company operating services in Somerset, England. It operated local town services in Yeovil under contract to the Somerset County Council as well as rural services. Nippy Club was launched in 2010 utilising a coach on chartered services twice a month for clubbers.

== History ==
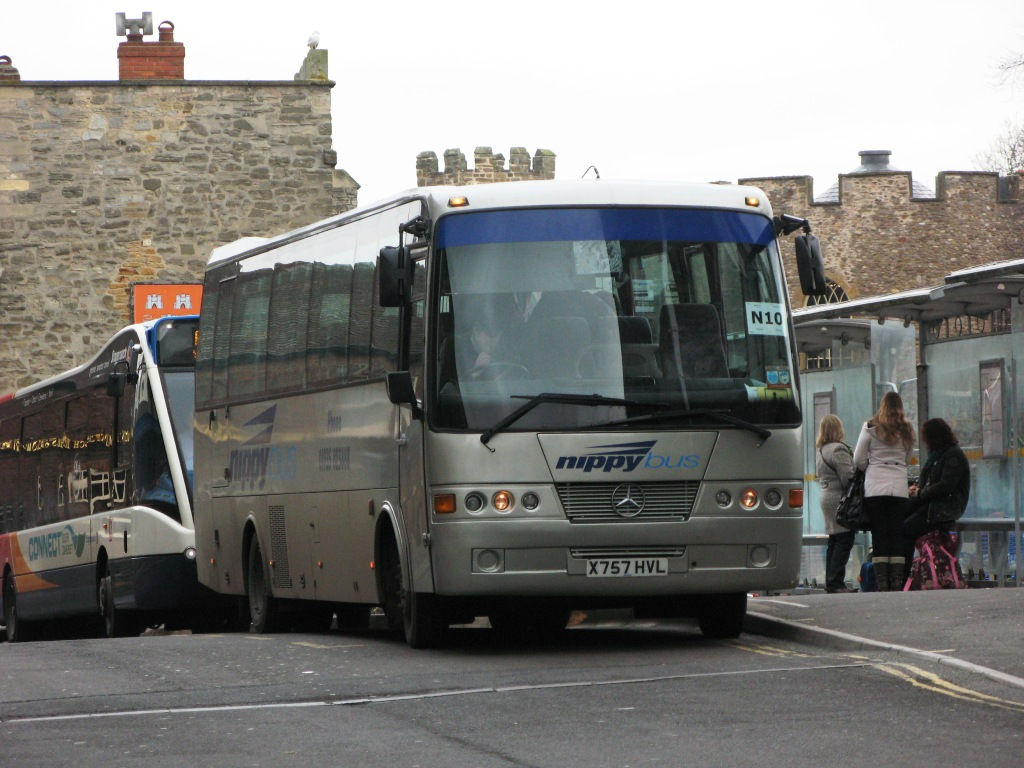
Ferqui Solera C35F bodied Mercedes-Benz O1120L in Castle Green, Taunton in June 2012

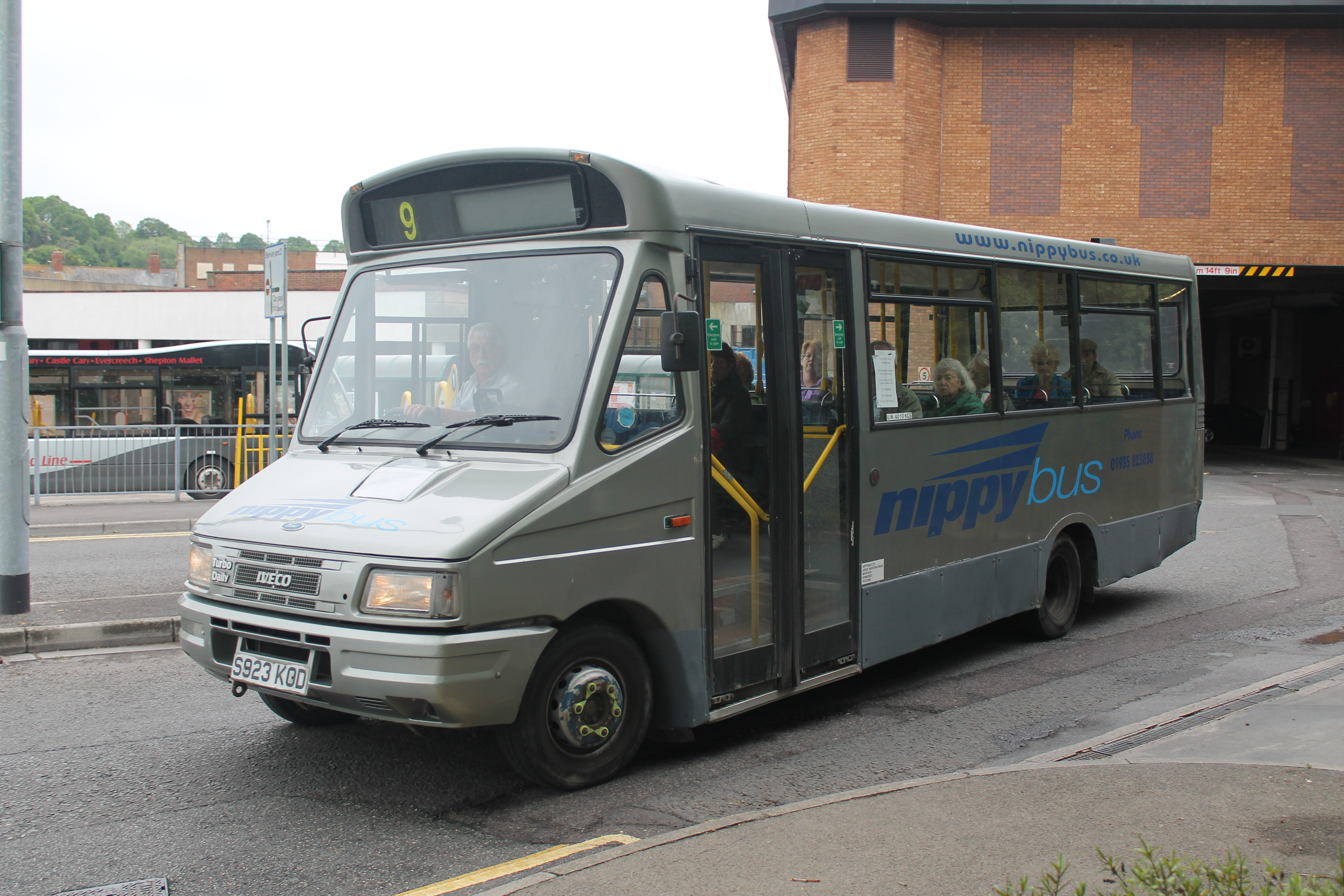
Iveco Turbo Daily in Yeovil in June 2013

Nippy Bus was founded in September 2004 beginning with five partially demand responsive night bus services, four of which (N1, N2, N4 and N5) started from market towns via villages in South Somerset to Yeovil serving parts of the town before reaching the centre. Route N3 operated as a local circular town service within Yeovil. After First Somerset & Avon cutbacks the company launched daytime services route N7 to replace First's 61A and route N8 to replace First's 56 under contract to Somerset County Council.

Originally based in Yeovil, the company moved to a purpose built garage in Martock, at the same time a commercial route began between Martock and Yeovil as route N9 operating as an express service in competition with First's route 52 offering a much shorter journey time. A demand responsive service operated from Martock as route N6 to provide connections to local villages including South Petherton.

Route N5 between Sherborne and Yeovil was withdrawn due to low passenger numbers. Routes 612 and 667 began to replace First routes of the same number.

Further expansion occurred with new route N10 to replace Safeway Services route 681, however at the same time South West Coaches offered to replace the route with route 81 when they acquired the company resulting in a situation whereby two routes served the same villages at the same time.

Route N10 was subsequently withdrawn and more new routes began including the N11, N12 and N14 under contract to Somerset County Council to replace South West Coaches routes.

Night Routes were expanded owing to the success in Yeovil to Taunton. Three Routes were launched the T1, T2 and T3 in Taunton and serving local villages surrounding the town. In addition a positioning trip running between Yeovil and Taunton was made into the first inter-urban night bus in Somerset which was branded as the Taunton Flyer. These routes were subsequently withdrawn.

Routes N7 and N14 were withdrawn and parts of these routes were incorporated into the N12. The company won new contracts from Somerset County Council for routes 63 and 633 which operated 3-4 daytime journeys Monday-Saturday, these routes were previously operated by Stagecoach South West, simultaneously they won school contracts for route 16 ex Stagecoach South West and routes 658 and 659 ex First Somerset & Avon.

On 1 May 2011, the Night Routes N1-N4 were withdrawn due to funding cuts. This resulted in the majority of Yeovil being left with no evening bus services.

Nippy Bus had been running a combination of demand responsive services and standard routes throughout South Somerset. Nippy Bus used Yeovil as a hub where one could interchange between services.

== Operation ==
There was some competition in their operating area with First Somerset & Avon and South West Coaches. In most villages Nippy Bus were the sole bus operator and therefore many communities were heavily reliant on their services. Opening up many villages to Monday-Saturday services for the first time ever either as demand responsive services or on fixed routes compared to the once a week services offered by the incumbent South West Coaches. The geographical area covered was fairly small stretching from Martock in the west to Sherborne in the east and from Yeovil in the south to Street in the north.

On 29 October 2017, Nippy Bus ceased trading with managing director Sydney Hardy sacking staff through an online internal memo. All former Nippy Bus routes were run by various operators on 29 and 30 October.

In January 2018, following a public inquiry by the Traffic Commissioner, Sydney Hardy was banned from holding an operator licence or running a licensed company for 10 years, and Nippybus' licence was revoked.
