= Benjamin Moseley =

Moseley, Benjamin (1742–1819), physician and opponent of vaccination

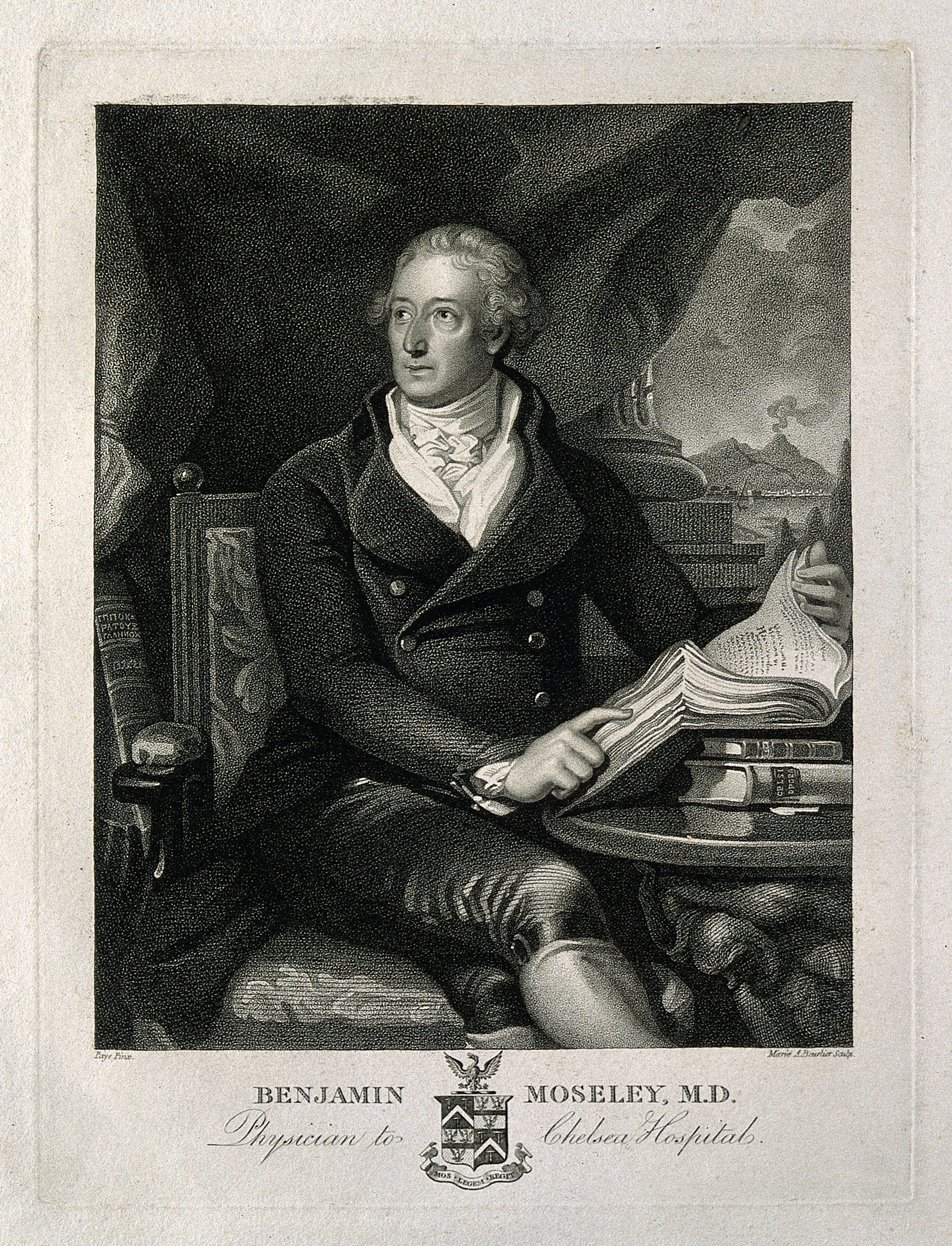
Moseley, Benjamin (1742–1819), physician and opponent of vaccination

Benjamin Moseley (1742–25 September 1819) was a British medical doctor and early opponent of vaccination.

Born in Essex, Moseley received his medical training in Paris and London and began his practice in Kingston, Jamaica, in 1768. During his sixteen years there, he studied and published pamphlets on diseases he encountered, like dysentery, and on the medicinal and agricultural effects of the island's consumable crops, like coffee and sugar. His practice during this time was profitable, and upon his return to Britain in 1784 he had enough money to travel across Europe and to obtain more medical training, earning an M.D. from St. Andrews University. He was elected as a member to the American Philosophical Society in 1775. In 1788, he began a medical practice catering to wealthy patients in London and became a physician to the Royal Hospital in Chelsea.

== Vaccine hesitancy ==
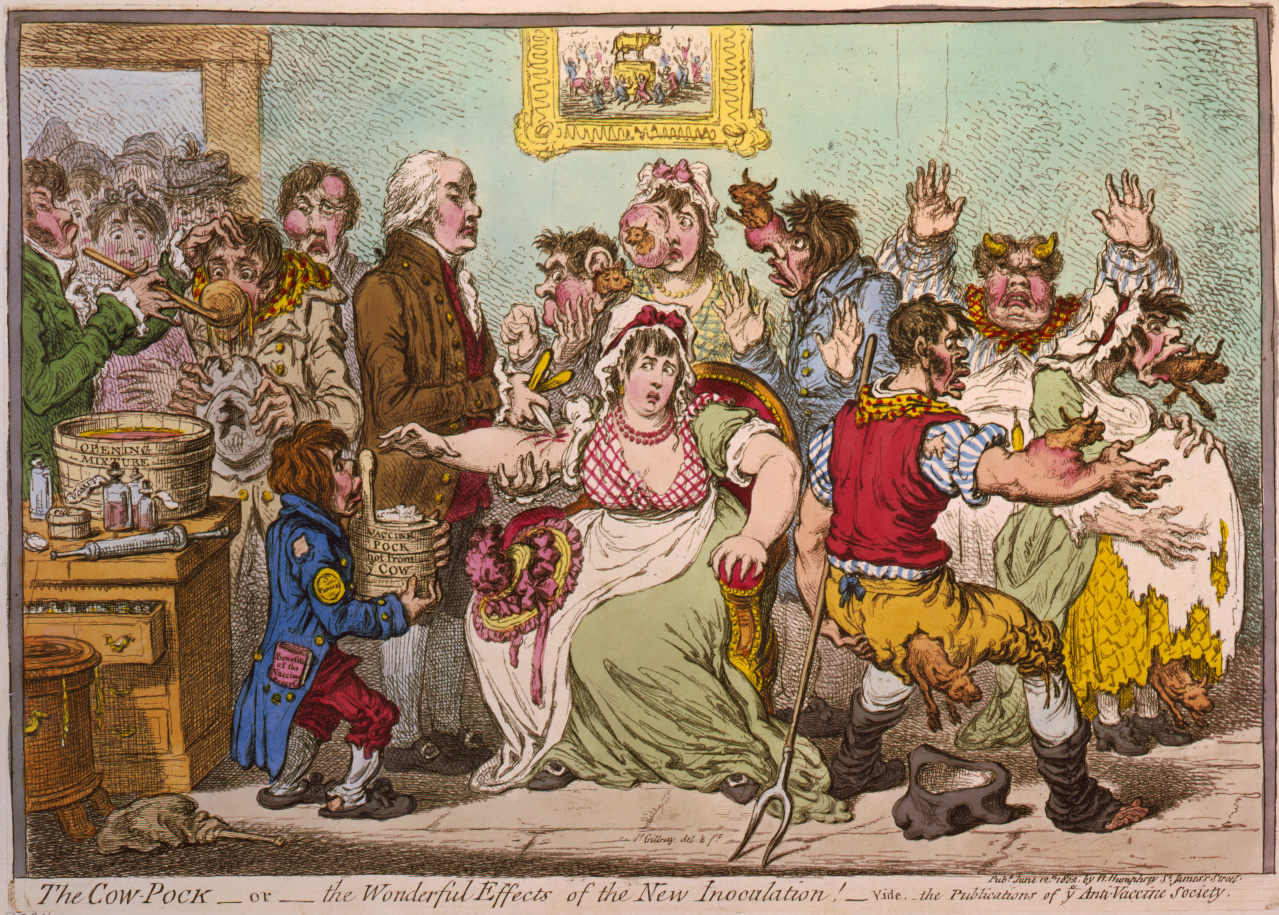
The Cow-Pock—or—the Wonderful Effects of the New Inoculation!—vide. the Publications of y^{e} Anti-Vaccine Society Print (color engraving) published June 12, 1802 by H. Humphrey, St. James's Street.

He was an early opponent of the new practice of vaccination. Beginning in 1799, in pamphlets and journal articles, he expressed doubt as to the efficacy of using doses of cowpox to protect patients from becoming ill with smallpox and outrage at his medical colleagues for adopting the new practice so quickly. He put forth theories that vaccinations would have horrible side-effects, including physical ailments like whooping cough and intellectual afflictions like insanity. Some of his warnings were based on the fears of other objectors to vaccination; others were original to him. Moseley expressed his views before Parliament during investigations into the practice in 1802 and 1808. His outlandish theories were the basis for a satirical cartoon by James Gillray called “The Cow Pock” which portrayed small cows bursting out of human bodies.

Moseley died in Southend, a favorite summer vacation spot, in 1819. Moseley's library was sold in a sale by Evans in London on 22 November (and four following days). A copy of the catalogue is held at Cambridge University Library (shelfmark Munby.c.122(3)).
