= Nathaniel Ireson =

Nathaniel Ireson (1685 – 18 April 1769) was a potter, architect and mason best known for his work around Wincanton in Somerset, England.

He was probably born in Ansley, Warwickshire.

He rebuilt much of the centre of Wincanton following a fire in 1707.

He was churchwarden at St Peter's in Stourton, Wiltshire during the 1720s and may have done work on the church himself.

He moved to Wincanton around 1726, and owned a pottery there from 1738-1750. There is a monument to him in the Churchyard of St Peter and St Paul, Wincanton, including a statue which he is believed to have carved himself.

== Works ==
- Crowcombe Court (completing earlier work by another builder.
- Stourhead 1720-1724.
- Ven House, Milborne Port enlargement around 1725 - 1730.
- The Church of St Peter in Redlynch, Somerset 1750.
- Park House, Mells Park, Somerset.
- Meadow Court, Tockenham, Wiltshire.
- Shanks House, Cucklington.
- The Dogs, Wincanton 1740-1750.
- Church of St Mary, Bruton rebuilt chancel in 1743.
- Corsham Court remodelling of front 1747.
- St Peter and St Paul, Wincanton. Modifications in 1747, including the construction, at his own expense, of the chancel (later removed) and several monuments.
