= Wincanton =

Town in Somerset, England

Coordinates: 51.0559°N 2.4102°W

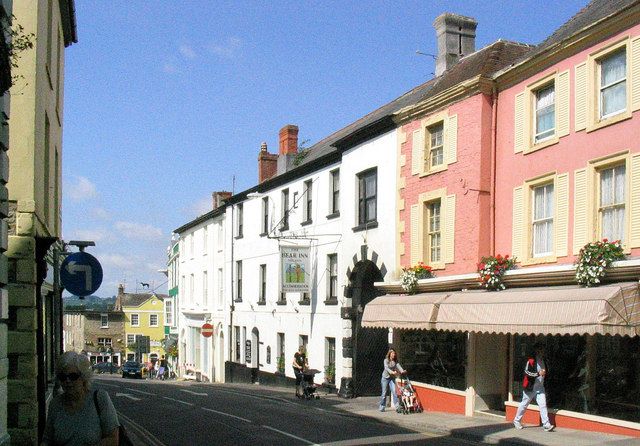
- Wincanton High Street

- Location within Somerset
- Population: 6,573 (2021 census)
- OS grid reference: ST712286
- Unitary authority: Somerset Council
- Ceremonial county: Somerset
- Region: South West
- Country: England
- Sovereign state: United Kingdom
- Post town: Wincanton
- Postcode district: BA9
- Dialling code: 01963
- Police: Avon and Somerset
- Fire: Devon and Somerset
- Ambulance: South Western
- UK Parliament: Glastonbury and Somerton

Wincanton (/ˈwɪŋkæntən/ or /wɪŋˈkæntən/) is a town and civil parish in Somerset, southwest England. The town lies off the A303 road, a main route between London and South West England, and has some light industry. In the 2021 census the civil parish had a population of 6,573.

== Toponymy ==
The name of Wincanton is first attested in 1084, in the forms Wincainietone and Wincautone. In the Domesday Book of 1086, the name is spelled Wincaleton. The town's name comes from the name of the River Cale, which runs through the town and was in Old English called Wincawel, combined with the Old English word tūn, "estate, settlement". It thus once meant "estate on the River Cale".

The origin of the name of the River Cale itself is less clear. It is first attested in a fourteenth-century copy of a charter from 956, where it appears in the forms Cawel and Wricawel, the latter of which is agreed to be a scribal error for *Wincawel. The leading suggestion for the origin of this name is that cawel is the Brittonic word, meaning "basket", found in Cornish as cawal and Welsh as cawell (borrowed from the Latin word *cavellum 'basket'). If so, the baskets were perhaps fish-traps, and the river was named for their use in it. The win- element is the Brittonic word meaning "white", and was not necessarily used literally: different arms of the same river were regularly distinguished by being labelled "white" and "black" (as in the rivers Whiteadder and Blackadder).

== History ==
Windmill Hill was the site of a Bronze Age Beaker culture burial, and contemporary artefacts have been found on the Selwood Ridge.

Prior to the Norman Conquest Wincanton was frequently the scene of battles between the Britons, Danes and Saxons. During the reign of Edmund Ironside, the English, under his command, defeated the Danes, forcing them to leave England.

Cockroad Wood Castle, which is now in the parish of Charlton Musgrove, was a motte and bailey castle, probably built after the Norman Conquest in 1066. The castle sits close to the contemporary Norman castles of Ballands and Castle Orchard, and may have been built as part of a system of fortifications to control the surrounding area. By 1086 the surrounding land was held by Walter of Douai, although no documentary evidence of the castle remains. At the time of the Domesday Book, the village was home to 49 households.

The parish of Wincanton was part of the Norton Ferris Hundred.

Wincanton was probably the site of a market in the medieval period but did not gain a market and fair charter until 1556.

The town was the scene of one of the few armed skirmishes in England during the Glorious Revolution of 1688. In the Wincanton Skirmish a troop of Horse Guards under Patrick Sarsfield, loyal to James II, defeated an advance party of troops fighting for William of Orange, on 20 November 1688. A great part of the town was destroyed by fires in the years 1707 and 1747.

In the early 19th century Wincanton was a depot for French officer prisoners of war, during the Napoleonic Wars.

By 2010 there had been an influx of foreign nationals, especially Portuguese and Polish citizens.

== Governance ==
For local government purposes, since 1 April 2023, the parish comes under the unitary authority of Somerset Council. Prior to this, it was part of the non-metropolitan district of South Somerset (established under the Local Government Act 1972). It was part of Wincanton Rural District before 1974.

Wincanton has its own town council. The town council has responsibility for local issues, including setting an annual precept (local rate) to cover the council's operating costs and producing annual accounts for public scrutiny. The town council evaluates local planning applications and works with the local police, district council officers, and neighbourhood watch groups on matters of crime, security, and traffic; their role also includes initiating projects for the maintenance and repair of parish facilities, as well as consulting with the district council on the maintenance, repair, and improvement of highways, drainage, footpaths, public transport, and street cleaning. Conservation matters (including trees and listed buildings) and environmental issues are also the responsibility of the council.

It is part of Glastonbury and Somerton, a constituency of the House of Commons. The current member of parliament is the Liberal Democrats politician Sarah Dyke.

== Community services ==
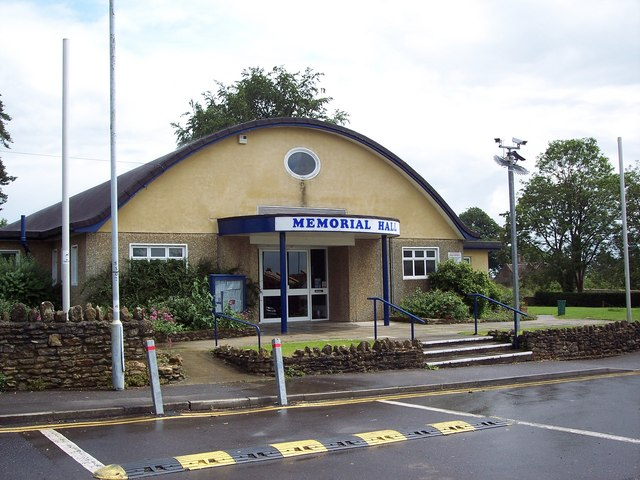
Memorial Hall

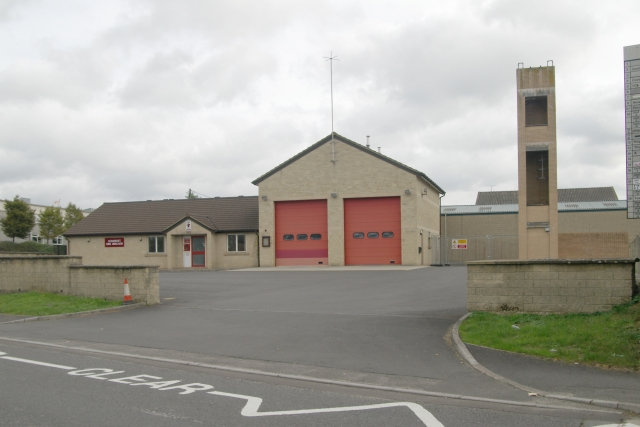
Wincanton Fire Station

Wincanton Community Hospital in Dancing Lane was formerly known as Verrington Hospital and in March 2015 had 28 beds on two wards plus intermediate care unit. It opened as an Isolation Hospital in September 1910 for patients with scarlet fever.

The Balsam Centre is a healthy living centre and also a children's centre for Wincanton and southeast Somerset.

The Memorial Hall, which opened on 9 January 1959, has a stage as well as facilities for dancing or for seating 250. It also has a separate committee room that can seat 50.

Fire, police and ambulance services are provided jointly with other authorities through the Devon and Somerset Fire and Rescue Service, Avon and Somerset Constabulary and the South Western Ambulance Service.

== Geography ==
Wincanton is situated on the northeast edge of Blackmore Vale, 12 miles (19 km) northeast of Yeovil, and 10 miles (16 km) northwest of Shaftesbury on the extreme southeast of Somerset close to the borders of Dorset and Wiltshire.

=== Climate ===
Along with the rest of South West England, Wincanton has a temperate climate which is generally wetter and milder than the rest of the country. The annual mean temperature is about 10 °C (50 °F); due to the modifying effect of the sea the range is less than in most other parts of the UK. January is the coldest month with mean minimum temperatures between 1 °C (34 °F) and 2 °C (36 °F). July and August are the warmest months in the region with mean daily maxima around 21 °C (70 °F).

Convective cloud often forms inland however, especially near hills, reducing the number of hours of sunshine. The average annual sunshine totals around 1,600 hours.

Rainfall tends to be associated with Atlantic depressions or with convection. The Atlantic depressions are more vigorous in autumn and winter and most of the rain which falls in those seasons in the southwest is from this source. Average rainfall is about 725 millimetres (28.5 in). November to March have the highest mean wind speeds, with June to August having the lightest winds. The predominant wind direction is from the southwest.

== Demographics ==
At the 2021 census, Wincanton civil parish had a population of 6,573 in 2,915 households. The Office for National Statistics also define a Wincanton "built-up area" which excludes outlying parts of the parish, but includes Bayford which is in the neighbouring parish of Stoke Trister; this area had a population of 6,745 in 2021.

Census population of Wincanton parish
Census	Population	Female	Male	Households	Source
2001	4,639	2,359	2,280	2,040	
2011	5,272	2,713	2,559	2,325	
2021	6,573	3,332	3,241	2,915	

== Economy ==
In the late 1890s the West Surrey Central Dairy Company purchased a local creamery. In 1908, after developing a dried milk baby powder, it changed its name to Cow & Gate. The creamery and dairy products factory had its own sidings from the Somerset and Dorset Joint Railway station, providing access for milk trains.

In order to cope with the transport problems across its quickly expanding creamery, milk bottling and doorstep delivery network, Cow & Gate formed a dedicated logistics arm in 1920. Spun out in 2002 from successor company Unigate, Wincanton plc is now a major logistics company. The company still has a dairy products base in the town, although its head office function moved to Chippenham, Wiltshire in 2005.

In 1999, Unigate sold its remaining dairies to Dairy Crest, which still has a creamery and milk processing plant in the town, but has sold the cheese business to Adams Foods Ltd, producer of the Pilgrim's Choice brand of Cheddar cheese.

Several businesses are located in Wincanton, such as Coffee Sense Coffee Roasters who won a Guild of Fine Food Great Taste Award Winner in 2017 and Boxclever Press Ltd who gained royal recognition in 2019 when they were awarded a Queen's Award for Enterprise in the international trade category

== Landmarks ==
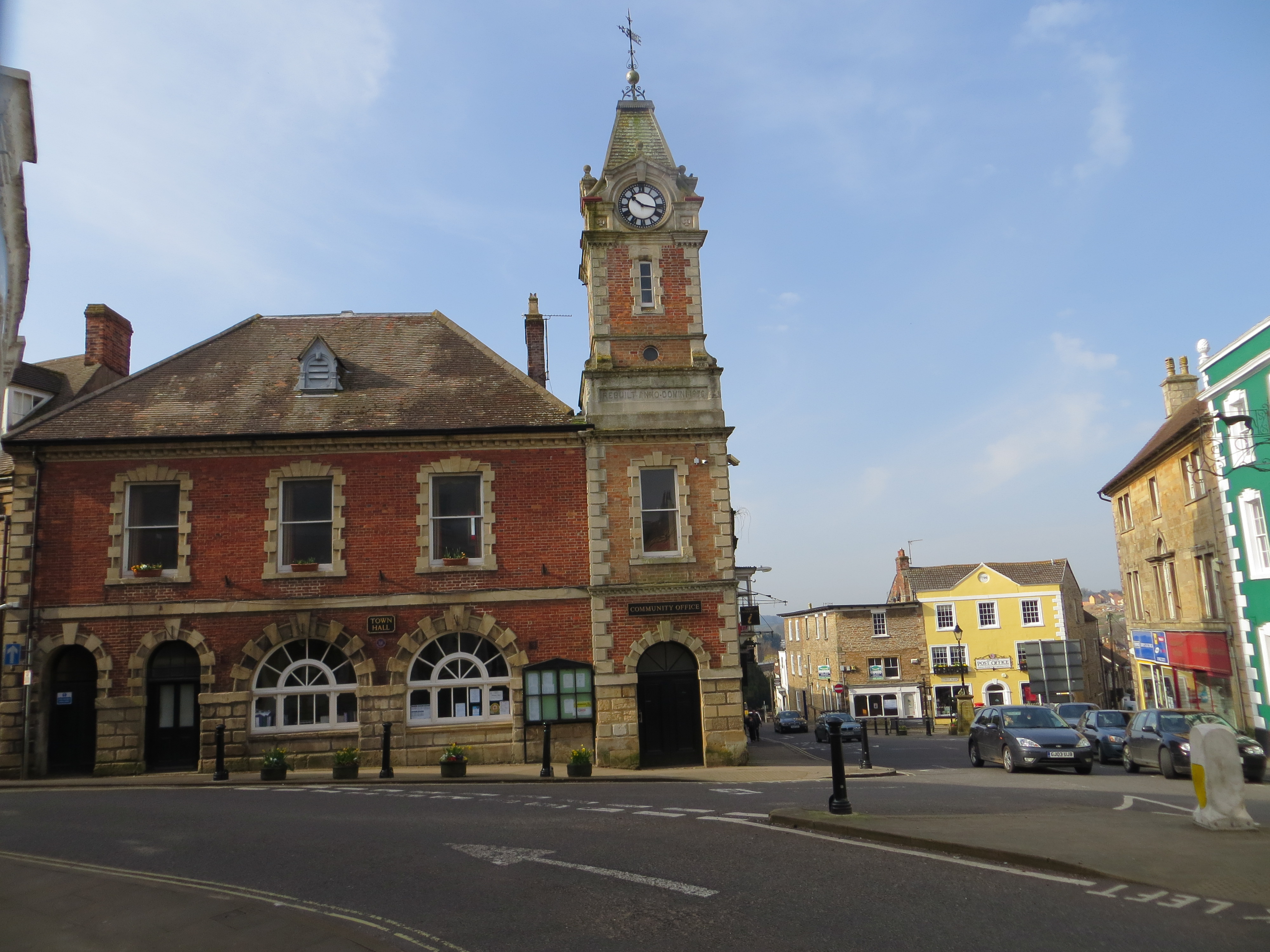
Wincanton Town Hall

The Dogs (also called The Old House) was built around 1650, and was reshaped internally by Nathaniel Ireson in 1740–50. It is a grade I listed building.

Wincanton Town Hall, the third on its site, was completed in 1878.

== Transport ==
Wincanton railway station was on the Somerset and Dorset Joint Railway but this closed on 7 March 1966. The nearest railway stations now are Templecombe railway station on the Exeter to Waterloo line, and Castle Cary railway station on the Reading to Taunton and Heart of Wessex lines.

The town is north of the A303 road, one of the main routes between London and South West England.

The town is served twice daily by Berrys Coaches 'Superfast' service to and from London.

== Media ==
Local news and television programmes are provided by BBC West and ITV West Country. Television signals are received from the Mendip TV transmitter.

Local radio stations are BBC Radio Somerset on 95.5 FM, Heart West on 102.6 FM, Greatest Hits Radio South West (formerly The Breeze) on 106.6 FM, Abbey104 on 104.7 FM and Radio Ninesprings, a community based station which broadcast to the town on 104.5 FM.

The town is served by the local newspaper, Western Gazette which publishes Thursdays.

== Education ==
Primary education up to the age of 11 is offered by Wincanton Primary School and Our Lady of Mount Carmel Catholic Primary School. The history of Wincanton Primary began in 1833 when an appeal was launched to provide a National school in Wincanton and after a number of difficulties the school was built in North Street in 1838, although this had very few pupils. A school board was formed in 1871 and opened a school in the former National school buildings with over 200 pupils. In 1875 there were 206 children attending. In 1894 the board raised money for a new school to accommodate 445 children, which opened in South Street in 1897.

Wincanton has one secondary school, King Arthur's School, which is Somerset's first specialist sports college.

The Balsam Centre is a healthy living centre and also a children's centre. Since 2005 it has received grants for the re-fitting of the training kitchen and construction and refurbishment to create a dedicated teaching area, counselling and interview rooms and a studio space for physical and community activities.

== Religious sites ==
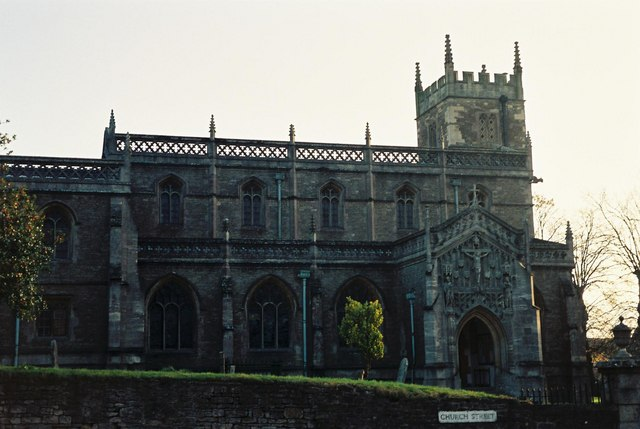
Church of St Peter and St Paul

The Church of St Peter and St Paul was almost totally rebuilt in 1887-91 by J. D. Sedding; however, parts of the tower may be remnants of an earlier church, dating from 1313, on the same site. In 1793 the tower was raised by 12 feet (4 m) making it 50 feet (15 m) high; five bells were cast and a sixth added. The additional carving and north porch were added in subsequent years. The churchyard includes a self-designed monument to the local architect Nathaniel Ireson who died in 1796. Because of the state of the roofs, which are under repair, the church is included on the Heritage at Risk Register.

The Roman Catholic Church and Presbytery of St Luke and St Teresa was built in 1881 by the priest/architect A.J.C Scoles.

There are also places of worship for Pentecostals, Methodists, Baptists and Quakers in the town.

== Culture ==
Wincanton Museum is a small local museum in the high street which closed in 2010. You can now visit some of the items which were in the museum in the library which is situated in Carrington Way.

In 2023 the museum reopened in a new site on the high street, with free admission to view the artefacts.

== Notable people ==
- John Ring (1752–1821), surgeon, vaccination activist, and man of letters.
- General Sir Mosley Mayne (1889–1955), senior British Indian Army officer, where he commanded Eastern Command (India).
- Tony Weare (1912–1994), comics artist and cartoonist.
- Diana Hoddinott (born 1941), actress, played Annie Hacker, the wife of Jim Hacker
- Sir Robert Burgess (1947–2022), sociologist and academic, Vice-Chancellor of the University of Leicester; went to local school.
- Colonel Lucy Giles (born 1969), former British Army officer, Commander at the Royal Military Academy Sandhurst.

== Sports ==
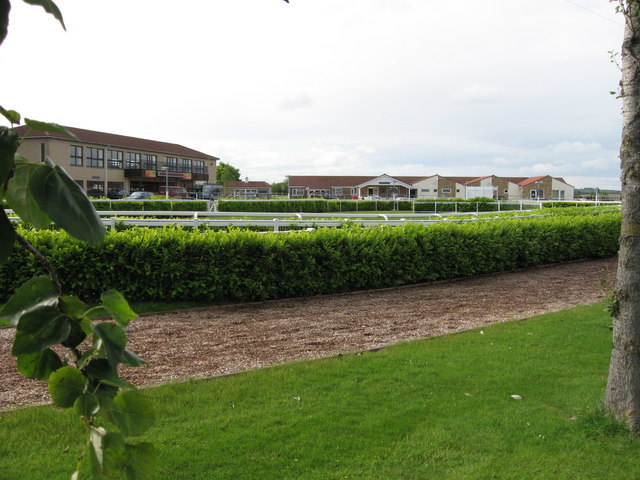
Wincanton Racecourse

The town gives its name to Wincanton Racecourse which is in the neighbouring parish of Charlton Musgrove.

Wincanton has a Non-League football club Wincanton Town F.C. who play at the Wincanton Sports Ground on Moor Lane. The Sports Ground in Moor Lane also provides facilities for tennis and bowls.

Wincanton Sports Centre was opened in 2001, funded by a National Lottery grant.

The cricket club, which plays in the recreation ground, has two Saturday teams and a Sunday team.

The rugby union club plays at King Arthur's Community School in the town. In 2010 they won the Dorset & Wilts division of the English Rugby Union South West Division.

== Twinning & relation to Discworld ==
Wincanton is unusual in that it was twinned in 2002 with a town which can only be found in fiction. As well as with Gennes / Les Rosiers in France and Lahnau in Germany, Wincanton is twinned with Ankh-Morpork, a fictional city state near the Circle Sea on Terry Pratchett's Discworld. On 5 April 2009, a number of roads on a new housing development were given names taken from Ankh-Morpork, such as Peach Pie Street and Treacle Mine Road, after a short-list was voted upon by fans. There are shops in the town selling Discworld-related goods. In 2015 the Uncle Tom's Cabin pub unveiled a sign by Discworld illustrator Richard Kingston referencing The Mended Drum. Pratchett and Kingston were regulars. The other Pratchett connection is to be found in Cale Park. A new bridge was built over the River Cale from the main park to the children's recreation area. The name 'Troll Bridge' was chosen by the public from a list of nominations. This refers to a short story written by Terry Pratchett and a short film of the same name made by Snowgum Films.
