= Dorset & Wilts 3 South =

English Rugby Union league

- Sport: Rugby union
- Instituted: 1992 (as Berks/Dorset/Wilts 3)
- Ceased: 2019
- Number of teams: 7
- Country: England
- Holders: New Milton III (2nd title) (2018–19) (not promoted to Dorset & Wilts 2 South as 2nd XV in division above)
- Most titles: East Dorset, New Milton III, North Dorset III (2 titles)
- Website: englandrugby.com

Dorset & Wilts 3 South was an English Rugby Union league, forming part of the South West Division, primarily for clubs based in Dorset, sitting at tier 10 of the English rugby union system. Promoted teams generally moved up to Dorset & Wilts 2 South. Relegated teams dropped to Dorset & Wilts 4 until the cancellation of this division at the end of the 2015–16 season; after that there was no relegation. The league was created in 2005 and disbanded after the 2018–19 season.

== History ==
Until 2005, Dorset & Wilts 3 was one division with teams from Berkshire included. In that year, three regional divisions were created for teams in Dorset and Wiltshire, namely Dorset & Wilts 3 North, Dorset & Wilts 3 South and Dorset & Wilts 3 West. The West division was disbanded at the end of the 2008–09 season, leaving just the North and South divisions. At the end of the 2018–19 season Dorset & Wilts 3 South was cancelled.

On occasion, clubs in this division also took part in the RFU Junior Vase, a level 9–12 national competition.

== 2019–20 ==
Team	Ground	Capacity	Town/Village	Previous season
Bournemouth IV	Chapel Gate		Bournemouth, Dorset	5th
Dorchester III	Coburg Road		Dorchester, Dorset	4th
Ellingham & Ringwood III	Parsonage Barn Lane		Ringwood, Hampshire	7th
New Milton III	Normans Way		Ashley, New Milton, Hampshire	Champions (not promoted) (Note: Despite finishing as champions New Milton III were denied promotion due to the New Milton 2nd XV playing in the division above.)
North Dorset III	Slaughtergate	1,000	Gillingham, Dorset	Relegated from Dorset & Wilts 2 South (12th)
Oakmedians II	Meyrick Park		Bournemouth, Dorset	Relegated from Dorset & Wilts 2 South (11th)
Salisbury IV	Castle Road		Salisbury, Wiltshire	6th

Locations of the 2019–20 Dorset & Wilts 3 South teams

== 2018–19 ==
Team	Ground	Capacity	Town/Village	Previous season
Bournemouth IV	Chapel Gate		Bournemouth, Dorset	N/A (re-joined league)
Dorchester III	Coburg Road		Dorchester, Dorset	7th
Ellingham & Ringwood III	Parsonage Barn Lane		Ringwood, Hampshire	6th
New Milton III	Normans Way		Ashley, New Milton, Hampshire	Relegated from Dorset & Wilts 2 South (8th) (Note: Despite finishing 8th New Milton III were relegated due to New Milton II being relegated into Dorset & Wilts 2 South from Dorset & Wilts 1 South.)
Poole	Recreation Ground		Hamworthy, Poole, Dorset	2nd
Salisbury IV	Castle Road		Salisbury, Wiltshire	8th
Swanage & Wareham III	Bestwall Road		Wareham, Dorset	5th

Locations of the 2018–19 Dorset & Wilts 3 South teams

== 2017–18 ==
Team	Ground	Capacity	Town/Village	Previous season
Dorchester III	Coburg Road		Dorchester, Dorset	N/A (joined league)
Ellingham & Ringwood III	Parsonage Barn Lane		Ringwood, Hampshire	10th
Fordingbridge II	The Recreation Ground		Fordingbridge, Hampshire	9th
North Dorset III	Slaughtergate	1,000	Gillingham, Dorset	N/A (joined league)
Poole	Recreation Ground		Hamworthy, Poole, Dorset	5th
Salisbury IV	Castle Road		Salisbury, Wiltshire	8th
Swanage & Wareham III	Bestwall Road		Wareham, Dorset	6th
Wimborne III	Leigh Park		Wimborne, Dorset	4th

Locations of the 2017–18 Dorset & Wilts 3 South teams

== 2016–17 ==
- Blandford II
- Bournemouth V
- Dinton
- Ellingham & Ringwood III
- Fordingbridge II (relegated from Dorset & Wilts 2 South)
- New Milton III
- Oakmedians III
- Poole (relegated from Dorset & Wilts 2 South)
- Salisbury IV
- Swanage & Wareham III
- Weymouth & Portland II
- Wimborne III

== 2015–16 ==
The division consisted of ten teams, seven in Dorset, two in Wiltshire and one in Hampshire.

Seven of the teams participated in last season's competition. The 2014–15 champions, Wheatsheaf Cabin Crew were promoted to Dorset & Wilts 2 South along with Poole (2nd) and Fordingbridge II (3rd), while Weymouth & Portland II and Blandford II were relegated to Dorset & Wilts 4.

Locations of the 2015–16 Dorset & Wilts 3 South teams in Dorset & Wiltshire

Team	Ground	Capacity	Town/Village	Previous season
Bournemouth IV	Chapel Gate		Bournemouth, Dorset	6th
Dinton	The Recreation Ground		Dinton, Wiltshire	9th
Dorchester III	Coburg Road		Dorchester, Dorset	Promoted from Dorset & Wilts 4 (champions)
Dorset Dockers II	Potterne Park		Verwood, Dorset	5th
Lytchett Minster II	Lytchett Park		Lytchett Minster, Poole, Dorset	Promoted from Dorset & Wilts 4 (runners up)
Newton Milton III	Normans Way		Ashley, New Milton, Hampshire	10th
Oakmedians II	Meyrick Park		Bournemouth, Dorset	8th
Salisbury III	Castle Road		Salisbury, Wiltshire	7th
Swanage & Wareham III	Bestwall Road		Wareham, Dorset	4th
Wimborne III	Leigh Park		Wimborne, Dorset	Relegated from Dorset & Wilts 2 South (11th)

== 2012–13 ==
- Frome III
- Lytchett Minster
- Oakmeadians III
- Salisbury III
- South Wilts
- Swanage & W III
- Verwood
- Wheatsheaf Cabin Crew
- Wimborne III
- Wincanton

== Original teams ==
When this division was introduced in 1992 it was a single division known as Berks/Dorset/Wilts 3, containing the following teams from Dorset and Wiltshire (Note: Despite the name for the first season of Berks/Dorset/Wilts 3 there were no actual Berkshire based clubs.):

- Amesbury – transferred from Berks/Dorset/Wilts 3 East (4th)
- Colerne – transferred from Berks/Dorset/Wilts 3 East (5th)
- Plessey Christ (Note: Plessey Christ would be renamed as Christchurch RFC for the 1993–94 season onward.) – transferred from Berks/Dorset/Wilts 3 West (6th)
- Portcastrians (Note: In Portcastrians would be renamed as East Dorset RFC in 2003.) – transferred from Berks/Dorset/Wilts 3 West (7th)
- Poole – transferred from Berks/Dorset/Wilts 3 West (5th)
- Westbury – transferred from Berks/Dorset/Wilts 3 West (4th)

== Dorset & Wilts 3 South honours ==
=== Berks/Dorset/Wilts 3 (1992–1993) ===
Originally Dorset & Wilts 3 North and Dorset & Wilts 3 South were combined in a single division known as Berks/Dorset/Wilts 3. Berks/Dorset/Wilts 3 itself was created ahead of the 1992–93 season by merging the existing Berks/Dorset/Wilts 3 East and Berks/Dorset/Wilts 3 West divisions. It was a tier 10 league with promotion to Berks/Dorset/Wilts 2 and there was no relegation.

Berks/Dorset/Wilts 3
Season	No of teams	Champions	Runners–up	Relegated team(s)	Ref
1992–93	6	Poole	Westbury	No relegation	
Green backgrounds are promotion places.

=== Berks/Dorset/Wilts 3 (1993–1996) ===
The creation of National League 5 South for the 1993–94 season meant that Berks/Dorset/Wilts 3 dropped to become a tier 11 league. Promotion continued to Berks/Dorset/Wilts 2 and there was no relegation.

Berks/Dorset/Wilts 3
Season	No of teams	Champions	Runners–up	Relegated team(s)	Ref
1993–94	6	Berkshire Shire Hall	Pewsey Vale	No relegation	
1994–95	8	Portcastrians	Tadley	No relegation	
1995–96	6	Dorset Police	Colerne	No relegation	
Green backgrounds are promotion places.

=== Berks/Dorset/Wilts 3 (1996–2000) ===
The cancellation of National League 5 South at the end of the 1995–96 season meant that Berks/Dorset/Wilts 3 reverted to being a tier 10 league. Promotion continued to Berks/Dorset/Wilts 2 and there was no relegation. At the end of the 1999–00 season the division was cancelled and all teams transferred into the new look Dorset & Wilts 2 North or Dorset & Wilts 2 South (Note: Berks/Dorset/Wilts 2 would be divided into Dorset & Wilts 2 North or Dorset & Wilts 2 South ahead of the 2000–01 season.)

Berks/Dorset/Wilts 3
Season	No of teams	Champions	Runners–up	Relegated team(s)	Ref
1996–97	7	Minety	Christchurch	No relegation	
1997–98	7	Puddletown	Hungerford	No relegation	
1998–99	7	Bradford-on-Avon	Berkshire Shire Hall	No relegation	
1999–00	6	Hungerford	Warminster (Note: This would be the last season of Berks/Dorset/Wilts 3. All six Teams would all be promoted into a new regional league for the next season – joining either Dorset & Wilts 2 North or Dorset & Wilts 2 South depending on geographical location. A level 3 regional division would be reinstated in 2005–06.)	No relegation	
Green backgrounds are promotion places.

=== Dorset & Wilts 3 South (2005–2009) ===
After an absence of four years, Berks/Dorset/Wilts 3 was reintroduced in the form of two tier 10 regional divisions – Dorset & Wilts 3 North and Dorset & Wilts 3 South. Promotion was to Dorset & Wilts 2 South and there was no relegation.

Dorset & Wilts 3 South
Season	No of Teams	Champions	Runners–up	Relegated team(s)	Ref
2005–06	9	North Dorset III	Chard II	No relegation	
2006–07	10	Swanage & Wareham IV (Note: Not promoted as Swanage & Wareham 3rd team in division above.)	Blandford II	No relegation	
2007–08	8	Bridport II	Lytchett Minster II	No relegation	
2008–09	9	Fordingbridge II	Ellingham & Ringwood II	No relegation	
Green backgrounds are promotion places

=== Dorset & Wilts 3 South (2009–present) ===
Despite widespread restructuring by the RFU at the end of the 2008–09 season, Dorset & Wilts 3 South remained a tier 10 league, with promotion continuing to Dorset & Wilts 2 South and, between 2011 and 2016, relegation was to the since discontinued Dorset & Wilts 4. Dorset & Wilts 3 South was itself cancelled at the end of the 2018–19 season.

Dorset & Wilts 3 South
Season	No of Teams	Champions	Runners–up	Relegated team(s)	Ref
2009–10	10 (Note: Division expanded due to folding of Dorset & Wilts 3 West.)	East Dorset	Poole	No relegation	
2010–11	12	Wincanton	Weymouth & Portland II	Swanage & Wareham IV, Bournemouth IV, Wimborne III (Note: Teams were relegated due to the creation of a new Dorset & Wilts 4 division for the following season.)	
2011–12	10	Dorchester II	New Milton II	Lytchett Minster II, Blandford II, Bridport II	
2012–13	10	Lytchett Minster	Frome III	Oakmeadians Vets, Wincanton, Verwood	
2013–14	8	Bournemouth III	Wimborne III	No relegation	
2014–15	12	Wheatsheaf Cabin Crew	Poole	Weymouth & Portland II, Blandford II	
2015–16	9	Dorset Dockers II	Lytchett Minster II	No relegation	
2016–17	12	New Milton III	Blandford II (Note: 3rd place Dinton were also promoted.)	No relegation	
2017–18	8	North Dorset III	Wimborne III	No relegation	
2018–19	7 (Note: Reduced from 8 to 6 teams after Fordingbridge II and Blandford II, who had been relegated from Dorset & Wilts 2 North, dropped out. An extra team, Bournemouth IV rejoined to make it 7 teams.)	New Milton III (Note: Despite winning the league New Milton III could not be promoted due to the 2nd XV being in the division above.)	Poole (Note: 3rd place Swanage & Wareham III also promoted.)	No relegation	
Green backgrounds are promotion places

== Number of league titles ==
- East Dorset (2) (Note: One of East Dorset's title was won back when the league was Berks/Dorset/Wilts 3 and the club was known as Portcastrians.)
- New Milton III (2)
- North Dorset III (2)
- Berkshire Shire Hall (1) (Note: Berkshire Shire Hall's was won back when the league was Berks/Dorset/Wilts 3.)
- Bournemouth III (1)
- Bradford-on-Avon (1) (Note: Bradford-on-Avon's title was won back when the league was Berks/Dorset/Wilts 3.)
- Bridport II (1)
- Dorset Police (1) (Note: Dorset Police's title was won back when the league was Berks/Dorset/Wilts 3.)
- Dorchester II (1)
- Dorset Dockers II (1)
- Fordingbridge II (1)
- Hungerford (1) (Note: Hungerford's title was won back when the league was Berks/Dorset/Wilts 3.)
- Lytchett Minster (1)
- Minety (1) (Note: Minety's title was won back when the league was Berks/Dorset/Wilts 3.)
- Poole (1) (Note: Poole's title was won back when the league was Berks/Dorset/Wilts 3.)
- Puddletown (1) (Note: Puddletown's title was won back when the league was Berks/Dorset/Wilts 3.)
- Swanage & Wareham IV (1)
- Wheatsheaf Cabin Crew (1)
- Wincanton (1)

== See also ==
- South West Division RFU
- Dorset & Wilts RFU
- English rugby union system
- Rugby union in England
