= Dorset & Wilts 3 West =

English rugby union league

- Sport: Rugby Union
- Instituted: 1988; 38 years ago (as Berks/Dorset/Wilts 3 West)
- Ceased: 2009; 17 years ago
- Number of teams: 8
- Country: England
- Holders: Bradford-on-Avon II (1st title) (2008–09) (promoted to Dorset & Wilts 2 North)

Dorset & Wilts 3 West was English Rugby Union league, forming part of the South West Division, for clubs based in western Dorset. Promoted teams tended to move up to Dorset & Wilts 2 North or Dorset & Wilts 2 South depending on geographical location and there was no relegation. The league was originally created as Berks/Dorset/Wilts 3 West in 1988 and ran until 1992 until it merged with Berks/Dorset/Wilts 3 East to form Berks/Dorset/Wilts 3. The division would return as Dorset & Wilts 3 West in 2006. By the end of the 2008–09 season, the league was disbanded and clubs were transferred to Dorset & Wilts 3 North or Dorset & Wilts 3 South.

== Original teams ==
When this division was introduced in 1988 as Berks/Dorset/Wilts 3 West, it contained the following teams from Dorset and Wiltshire (Note: Despite the name for the first season of Berks/Dorset/Wilts 3 West there were no actual Berkshire based clubs.):

- Blandford
- Bridport
- Plessey Christ (Note: Plessey Christ would be renamed as Christchurch RFC for the 1993–94 season onward.)
- D.I.H.E. (Note: Dorset Institute of Higher Education would become known as Bournemouth University in 1992.)
- Portcastrians (Note: In Portcastrians would be renamed as East Dorset RFC in 2003.)
- Warminster
- Westbury

== Dorset & Wilts 3 West honours ==
=== Berks/Dorset/Wilts 3 West (1988–1992) ===
Originally known as Berks/Dorset/Wilts 3 West and involved involving clubs based in Berkshire (Note: Since 2000, Berkshire clubs have played in the Berks/Bucks & Oxon leagues.), Dorset and Wiltshire. It was a tier 10 league with promotion to Berks/Dorset/Wilts 2 and there was no relegation. At the end of the 1991–92 season Berks/Dorset/Wilts 3 West and counterpart Berks/Dorset/Wilts 3 East would merge into a single division known as Berks/Dorset/Wilts 3 (currently Dorset & Wilts 3 North and Dorset & Wilts 3 South).

Berks/Dorset/Wilts 3 West
| Season | No of Teams | Champions | Runners–up | Relegated Team(s) | Ref |
| 1988–89 | 7 | Westbury | Warminster | No relegation | |
| 1989–90 | 7 | D.I.H.E. | Warminster | No relegation | |
| 1990–91 | 7 | Warminster | Bridport | No relegation | |
| 1991–92 | 7 | Blandford | Trowbridge (Note: 3rd place Bridport were also promoted.) | No relegation | |
Green backgrounds are promotion places.

=== Dorset & Wilts 3 West (2006–2009) ===
Berks/Dorset/Wilts 3 West would return as Dorset & Wilts 3 West for the 2006–07 season, this time only involving clubs based in Dorset and Wiltshire. It was a tier 10 league with promotion to Dorset & Wilts 2 North or Dorset & Wilts 2 South and there was no relegation. After just three seasons the division was cancelled and all clubs transferred into either Dorset & Wilts 3 North or Dorset & Wilts 3 South.

Dorset & Wilts 3 West
| Season | No of Teams | Champions | Runners–up | Relegated Team(s) | Ref |
| 2006–07 | 10 | Corsham II | Bath Saracens | No relegation | |
| 2007–08 | 10 | Avonvale | Combe Down II | No relegation | |
| 2008–09 | 8 | Bradford-on-Avon II | South Wilts | No relegation | |
Green backgrounds are promotion places

== Number of league titles ==
- Avonvale (1)
- Blandford (1)
- Bradford-on-Avon II (1)
- Corsham II (1)
- D.I.H.E. (1)
- Warminster (1)
- Westbury (1)

== See also ==
- Dorset & Wilts RFU
- English Rugby Union Leagues
- English rugby union system
- Rugby union in England
