= Berks/Dorset/Wilts 3 East =

English rugby union league

- Sport: Rugby Union
- Instituted: 1988; 38 years ago (as Berks/Dorset/Wilts 3 East)
- Ceased: 1992; 34 years ago
- Number of teams: 8
- Country: England
- Holders: Calne (1st title) (1991–92) (promoted to Berks/Dorset/Wilts 2)

Berks/Dorset/Wilts 3 East was an English Rugby Union league, forming part of the South West Division, for clubs primarily based in Berkshire and Wiltshire. Promoted teams moved up to Berks/Dorset/Wilts 2 (currently Dorset & Wilts 2 North and Dorset & Wilts 2 South) and there was no relegation. The league ran for four seasons until 1992 when it merged with Berks/Dorset/Wilts 3 West to form Berks/Dorset/Wilts 3.

== Original teams ==
When this division was introduced in 1988 it contained the following teams from Berkshire, Hampshire and Wiltshire (Note: Despite the league name of Berks/Dorset/Wiltshire 3 East there were no teams from Dorset and one side was from Hampshire.):

- Amesbury
- Berkshire Shire Hall
- Calne
- Colerne
- Melksham
- Tadley
- Thatcham

== Berks/Dorset/Wilts 3 East honours ==
Originally known as Berks/Dorset/Wilts 3 East and involved involving clubs based in Berkshire (Note: Since 2000, Berkshire clubs have played in the Berks/Bucks & Oxon leagues.), Dorset and Wiltshire. It was a tier 10 league with promotion to Berks/Dorset/Wilts 2 and there was no relegation. At the end of the 1991–92 season Berks/Dorset/Wilts 3 East and counterpart Dorset & Wilts 3 West would merge into a single division known as Berks/Dorset/Wilts 3 (currently Dorset & Wilts 3 North and Dorset & Wilts 3 South).

Berks/Dorset/Wilts 3 East
Season	No of Teams	Champions	Runners–up	Relegated Team(s)	Ref
1988–89	7	Melksham	Berkshire Shire Hall	No relegation	
1989–90	7	Minety	Tadley	No relegation	
1990–91	7	Tadley	Thatcham	No relegation	
1991–92	5	Calne	Thatcham (Note: 3rd place Berkshire Shire Hall were also promoted.)	No relegation	
Green backgrounds are promotion places.

== Number of league titles ==
- Calne (1)
- Melksham (1)
- Minety (1)
- Tadley (1)

== See also ==
- Dorset & Wilts RFU
- English Rugby Union Leagues
- English rugby union system
- Rugby union in England
