= Dorset & Wilts 4 =

English rugby union league

- Current season or competition: 2015–16 Dorset & Wilts 4
- Sport: Rugby union
- Instituted: 2011; 15 years ago
- Ceased: 2016; 10 years ago
- Number of teams: 5
- Country: England
- Holders: Weymouth & Portland II (1st title) (2015–16) (promoted to Dorset & Wilts 3 South)
- Most titles: Bournemouth IV (2 titles)
- Website: englandrugby.com

Dorset & Wilts 4 was an English Rugby Union league, forming part of the South West Division, for clubs based in Dorset and Wiltshire as well as the occasional team from Somerset. Promoted teams moved up to Dorset & Wilts 3 North or Dorset & Wilts 3 South depending on geographical position. Due to a lack of teams the league was cancelled at the end of the 2015-16 season.

== 2015–16 ==
The 2015–16 Dorset & Wilts 4 consisted of five teams; two of which were based in Dorset and one each in Hampshire, Somerset and Wiltshire. The season started on 26 September 2015 and ended on 2 April 2016.

=== Participating teams and location ===
Two of the five teams participated in the previous season's competition. The 2014-15 champions, Dorchester III, along with runners up, Lytchett Minster II, were promoted to Dorset & Wilts 3 South. As the basement league in Dorset & Wilts there was no relegation.

Team	Ground	Capacity	Town/Village	Previous season
Blandford II	Larksmead Rugby Pitches		Blandford Forum, Dorset	Relegated from Dorset & Wilts 3 South (11th)
Ellingham & Ringwood III	Parsonage Barn Lane		Ringwood, Hampshire	3rd
Salisbury IV	Castle Road		Salisbury, Wiltshire	N/A
Weymouth & Portland II	Monmouth Avenue		Weymouth, Dorset	Relegated from Dorset & Wilts 3 South (12th)
Wincanton	Wincanton Sports Ground		Wincanton, Somerset	4th

Locations of the 2015-16 Dorset & Wilts 4 teams in Dorset, Hampshire, Somerset & Wiltshire

== Participating Clubs 2012–13 ==
- Blandford II
- Bournemouth IV
- Bridport II
- Ellingham & Ringwood III
- Lytchett Minster II
- New Milton III
- North Dorset IV
- Swanage & W IV
- Weymouth III

== Dorset & Wilts 4 Honours ==
Dorset & Wilts 4 Honours
Season	No of Teams	Champions	Runners–up	Relegated Teams	League Name
2011-12	6	Frome III	Wimborne III	No relegation	Dorset & Wilts 4
2012-13	8	Bournemouth IV (Note: Not promoted as Bournemouth 3rd team in division above.)	New Milton III	No relegation	Dorset & Wilts 4
2013-14	7	Bournemouth IV	Blandford II	No relegation	Dorset & Wilts 4
2014-15	6	Dorchester III	Lytchett Minster II	No relegation	Dorset & Wilts 4
2015-16	6	Weymouth & Portland II	Blandford II	No relegation	Dorset & Wilts 4
Green backgrounds are promotion places.

== Number of league titles ==
- Bournemouth IV (2)
- Dorchester III (1)
- Frome III (1)
- Weymouth & Portland II (1)

== See also ==
- Dorset & Wilts RFU
- English Rugby Union Leagues
- English rugby union system
- Rugby union in England
