= Dorset & Wilts 3 North =

Former English Rugby Union league

- Sport: Rugby union
- Instituted: 1992 (as Berks/Dorset/Wilts 3)
- Ceased: 2020
- Number of teams: 7
- Country: England
- Holders: Bath Saracens (1st title)
- Most titles: Combe Down II, Swindon College Old Boys II (2 titles)
- Website: englandrugby.com

Dorset & Wilts 3 North was an English Rugby Union league, forming part of the South West Division, for clubs primarily based in Wiltshire, sitting at tier 10 of the English rugby union system. Promoted teams tended to move up to Dorset & Wilts 2 North and there was no relegation. The league was created in 2005 and was disbanded after the 2019–20 season.

== History ==
Until 2005, Dorset & Wilts 3 was one division with teams from Berkshire included. In that year, three regional divisions were created for teams in Dorset and Wiltshire, namely Dorset & Wilts 3 North, Dorset & Wilts 3 South and Dorset & Wilts 3 West. The West division was disbanded at the end of the 2008–09 season, leaving just the North and South divisions.

On occasion, clubs in this division also took part in the RFU Junior Vase, a level 9–12 national competition.

The 2019–20 season ended early in view of the COVID-19 pandemic, in common with all English leagues. Neither of the Dorset & Wilts 3 divisions featured in plans for the 2020–21 season.

== 2019–20 ==
| Team | Ground | Capacity | Town/Village | Previous season |
|---|---|---|---|---|
| Bath Saracens | Sulis Sports Club | | Bath, Somerset | 3rd |
| Bradford-on-Avon II (Note: Bradford-on-Avon II would withdraw from Dorset & Wilts 3 North during the 2019–20 season.) | Broom Ground | | Winsley, Bradford-on-Avon, Wiltshire | 6th |
| Chippenham III | Allington Fields | | Chippenham, Wiltshire | 4th |
| Cricklade | Fairview Field | | Cricklade, Wiltshire | Relegated from Dorset & Wilts 2 North (11th) |
| Minety II | Minety Playing Fields | | Minety, Wiltshire | 8th |
| Royal Wootton Bassett III | Ballard's Ash Sports Ground | | Wootton Bassett, Wiltshire | Relegated from Dorset & Wilts 2 North (12th) |
| Swindon III | Greenbridge Road | | Swindon, Wiltshire | 7th |
| Warminister II | Folly Lane | | Warminster, Wiltshire | 5th |

Locations of the 2019–20 Dorset & Wilts 3 North teams

== 2018–19 ==
| Team | Ground | Capacity | Town/Village | Previous season |
|---|---|---|---|---|
| Amesbury | Archers Way | | Salisbury, Wiltshire | N/A (joined league) |
| Bath Saracens | Sulis Sports Club | | Bath, Somerset | 6th |
| Bradford-on-Avon II | Broom Ground | | Winsley, Bradford-on-Avon, Wiltshire | 8th |
| Chippenham III | Allington Fields | | Chippenham, Wiltshire | 5th |
| Combe Down II | Holly's Corner | | Combe Down, Bath, Somerset | Relegated from Dorset & Wilts 2 North (12th) |
| Minety II | Minety Playing Fields | | Minety, Wiltshire | 7th |
| Swindon III | Greenbridge Road | | Swindon, Wiltshire | 4th |
| Warminister II | Folly Lane | | Warminster, Wiltshire | 3rd |

Locations of the 2018–19 Dorset & Wilts 3 North teams

== 2017–18 ==
| Team | Ground | Capacity | Town/Village | Previous season |
|---|---|---|---|---|
| Bath Saracens | Sulis Sports Club | | Bath, Somerset | Relegated from Dorset & Wilts 2 North (11th) |
| Bradford-on-Avon II | Broom Ground | | Winsley, Bradford-on-Avon, Wiltshire | 5th |
| Chippenham III | Allington Fields | | Chippenham, Wiltshire | Relegated from Dorset & Wilts 2 North (12th) |
| Corsham II | Lacock Road | | Corsham, Wiltshire | 3rd |
| Melksham III | The Conigre | 1,000 | Melksham, Wiltshire | 11th |
| Minety II | Minety Playing Fields | | Minety, Wiltshire | 7th |
| Supermarine II | Supermarine Sports and Social Club | | South Marston, Swindon, Wiltshire | 9th |
| Swindon III | Greenbridge Road | | Swindon, Wiltshire | 10th |
| Trowbridge III | Doric Park | | Hilperton, Trowbridge, Wiltshire | 6th |
| Warminister II | Folly Lane | | Warminster, Wiltshire | 4th |

Locations of the 2017–18 Dorset & Wilts 3 North teams

== 2016–17 ==
- Alfred's Nomads
- Bradford-upon-Avon II (relegated from Dorset & Wilts 2 North)
- Corsham II
- Devizes III
- Melksham III
- Minety II
- Swindon III
- Swindon College Old Boys II (relegated from Dorset & Wilts 2 North)
- Supermarine II
- Trowbridge III
- Warminster II
- Westbury II

== 2015–16 ==
The division consisted of eleven teams, all based in Wiltshire.

Eight of the eleven teams participated in last season's competition. The 2014–15 champions, Combe Down II, were promoted to Dorset & Wilts 2 North, while Chippenham III and Supermarine II were relegated from there. No teams were relegated to Dorset & Wilts 4.

Locations of the 2015–16 Dorset & Wilts 3 North teams in Wiltshire

| Team | Ground | Capacity | Town/Village | Previous season |
|---|---|---|---|---|
| Alfred's Nomads | The Common | | Marlborough, Wiltshire | 7th |
| Chippenham III | Allington Fields | | Chippenham, Wiltshire | Relegated from Dorset & Wilts 2 North (10th) |
| Corsham II | Lacock Road | | Corsham, Wiltshire | Relegated from Dorset & Wilts 2 North (12th – dropped from league) |
| Devizes III | The Sports Club | | Devizes, Wiltshire | 2nd |
| Melksham III | The Conigre | 1,000 | Melksham, Wiltshire | 9th (not relegated) |
| Minety II | Minety Playing Fields | | Minety, Wiltshire | 8th |
| Royal Wootton Bassett III | Ballard's Ash Sports Ground | | Royal Wootton Bassett, Wiltshire | 5th |
| Supermarine II | Supermarine Sports and Social Club | | South Marston, Swindon, Wiltshire | Relegated from Dorset & Wilts 2 North (11th) |
| Swindon III | Greenbridge Road | | Swindon, Wiltshire | 4th |
| Warminster II | Folly Lane | | Warminster, Wiltshire | 3rd |
| Westbury II | Knott Field | | Westbury, Wiltshire | 6th |

== 2012–13 ==
- Bradford-on-Avon II
- Calne II
- Colerne
- Devizes III
- Melksham III
- Minety II
- Pewsey Vale II
- Supermarine III
- Swindon III
- Swindon College Old Boys III
- Trowbridge III
- Warminster II

== 2011–12 ==
- Calne II
- Colerne
- Combe Down II
- Devizes III
- Melksham III
- Midsomer Norton IV
- Mintey II
- Pewsey Vale II
- Supermarine II
- Swindon College Old Boys III
- Trowbridge III
- Warminster II

== Original teams ==
When this division was introduced in 1992 it was a single division known as Berks/Dorset/Wilts 3, containing the following teams from Dorset and Wiltshire (Note: Despite the name for the first season of Berks/Dorset/Wilts 3 there were no actual Berkshire based clubs.):

- Amesbury – transferred from Berks/Dorset/Wilts 3 East (4th)
- Colerne – transferred from Berks/Dorset/Wilts 3 East (5th)
- Plessey Christ (Note: Plessey Christ would be renamed as Christchurch RFC for the 1993–94 season onward.) – transferred from Berks/Dorset/Wilts 3 West (6th)
- Portcastrians (Note: In Portcastrians would be renamed as East Dorset RFC in 2003.) – transferred from Berks/Dorset/Wilts 3 West (7th)
- Poole – transferred from Berks/Dorset/Wilts 3 West (5th)
- Westbury – transferred from Berks/Dorset/Wilts 3 West (4th)

== Dorset & Wilts 3 North honours ==
=== Berks/Dorset/Wilts 3 (1992–1993) ===
Originally Dorset & Wilts 3 North and Dorset & Wilts 3 South were combined in a single division known as Berks/Dorset/Wilts 3. Berks/Dorset/Wilts 3 itself was created ahead of the 1992–93 season by merging the existing Berks/Dorset/Wilts 3 East and Berks/Dorset/Wilts 3 West divisions. It was a tier 10 league with promotion to Berks/Dorset/Wilts 2 and there was no relegation.

Berks/Dorset/Wilts 3
| Season | No of teams | Champions | Runners–up | Relegated team(s) | Ref |
| 1992–93 | 6 | Poole | Westbury | No relegation | |
Green backgrounds are promotion places.

=== Berks/Dorset/Wilts 3 (1993–1996) ===
The creation of National League 5 South for the 1993–94 season meant that Berks/Dorset/Wilts 3 dropped to become a tier 11 league. Promotion continued to Berks/Dorset/Wilts 2 and there was no relegation.

Berks/Dorset/Wilts 3
| Season | No of teams | Champions | Runners–up | Relegated team(s) | Ref |
| 1993–94 | 6 | Berkshire Shire Hall | Pewsey Vale | No relegation | |
| 1994–95 | 8 | Portcastrians | Tadley | No relegation | |
| 1995–96 | 6 | Dorset Police | Colerne | No relegation | |
Green backgrounds are promotion places.

=== Berks/Dorset/Wilts 3 (1996–2000) ===
The cancellation of National League 5 South at the end of the 1995–96 season meant that Berks/Dorset/Wilts 3 reverted to being a tier 10 league. Promotion continued to Berks/Dorset/Wilts 2 and there was no relegation. At the end of the 1999–00 season the division was cancelled and all teams transferred into the new look Dorset & Wilts 2 North or Dorset & Wilts 2 South (Note: Berks/Dorset/Wilts 2 would be divided into Dorset & Wilts 2 North or Dorset & Wilts 2 South ahead of the 2000–01 season.)

Berks/Dorset/Wilts 3
| Season | No of teams | Champions | Runners–up | Relegated team(s) | Ref |
| 1996–97 | 7 | Minety | Christchurch | No relegation | |
| 1997–98 | 7 | Puddletown | Hungerford | No relegation | |
| 1998–99 | 7 | Bradford-on-Avon | Berkshire Shire Hall | No relegation | |
| 1999–00 | 6 | Hungerford | Warminster (Note: This would be the last season of Berks/Dorset/Wilts 3. All six Teams would all be promoted into a new regional league for the next season – joining either Dorset & Wilts 2 North or Dorset & Wilts 2 South depending on geographical location. A level 3 regional division would be reinstated in 2005–06.) | No relegation | |
Green backgrounds are promotion places.

=== Dorset & Wilts 3 North (2005–2009) ===
After an absence of four years, Berks/Dorset/Wilts 3 was reintroduced in the form of two tier 10 regional divisions – Dorset & Wilts 3 North and Dorset & Wilts 3 South. Promotion was to Dorset & Wilts 2 North and there was no relegation.

Dorset & Wilts 3 North
| Season | No of Teams | Champions | Runners–up | Relegated team(s) | Ref |
| 2005–06 | 11 | Fairford | Sutton Benger | No relegation | |
| 2006–07 | 10 | Swindon College Old Boys II | Malmesbury | No relegation | |
| 2007–08 | 9 | Calne II | Royal Wootton Bassett III | No relegation | |
| 2008–09 | 7 | Minety II | Swindon College Old Boys II | No relegation | |
Green backgrounds are promotion places.

=== Dorset & Wilts 3 North (2009–present) ===
Despite widespread restructuring by the RFU at the end of the 2008–09 season, Dorset & Wilts 3 North remained a tier 10 league, with promotion continuing to Dorset & Wilts 2 North and there was no relegation.

Dorset & Wilts 3 North
| Season | No of Teams | Champions | Runners–up | Relegated team(s) | Ref |
| 2009–10 | 12 (Note: Division expanded due to folding of Dorset & Wilts 3 West.) | Corsham III | Marlborough II | No relegation | |
| 2010–11 | 11 | Swindon III | Westbury II | No relegation | |
| 2011–12 | 12 | Combe Down II | Supermarine II | No relegation | |
| 2012–13 | 12 | Colerne | Trowbridge III (Note: Not promoted as Trowbridge 2nd team in division above.) | No relegation | |
| 2013–14 | 12 | Trowbridge III | Bradford-on-Avon II | No relegation | |
| 2014–15 | 9 | Combe Down II | Devizes III | No relegation | |
| 2015–16 | 11 | Royal Wootton Bassett III | Chippenham III | No relegation | |
| 2016–17 | 12 | Swindon College Old Boys II | Alfred's Nomads | No relegation | |
| 2017–18 | 10 | Corsham II | Trowbridge III | No relegation | |
| 2018–19 | 8 (Note: Reduced from 10 to 8 teams after Melksham III and Supermarine II withdrew from league.) | Amesbury | Combe Down II | No relegation | |
| 2019–20 | 7 (Note: Reduced from 8 to 7 teams after Bradford-on-Avon II withdrew from league.) | Bath Saracens (Note: No promotion due to COVID-19 pandemic in the United Kingdom.) | Chippenham III | No relegation | |
| 2020–21 | 8 | | | No relegation | |
Green backgrounds are promotion places.

== Number of league titles ==
- Combe Down II (2)
- Swindon College Old Boys II (2)
- Amesbury (1)
- Bath Saracens (1)
- Berkshire Shire Hall (1) (Note: Berkshire Shire Hall's was won back when the league was Berks/Dorset/Wilts 3.)
- Bradford-on-Avon (1) (Note: Bradford-on-Avon's title was won back when the league was Berks/Dorset/Wilts 3.)
- Calne II (1)
- Colerne (1)
- Corsham II (1) (Note: Corsham have won two titles overall – one by the 2nd team and one by the 3rd team.)
- Corsham III (1)
- Dorset Police (1) (Note: Dorset Police's title was won back when the league was Berks/Dorset/Wilts 3.)
- Fairford (1)
- Hungerford (1) (Note: Hungerford's title was won back when the league was Berks/Dorset/Wilts 3.)
- Minety (1) (Note: As club Minety have actually won two titles – one by the 1st XV when the league was known as Berks/Dorset/Wilts 3, the other by the 2nd XV when the league was known as Dorset & Wilts 3 North.)
- Minety II (1)
- Poole (1) (Note: Poole's title was won back when the league was Berks/Dorset/Wilts 3.)
- Puddletown (1) (Note: Puddletown's title was won back when the league was Berks/Dorset/Wilts 3.)
- Portcastrians (1) (Note: Portcastrians (currently East Dorset) title was won back when the league was Berks/Dorset/Wilts 3.)
- Royal Wootton Bassett III (1)
- Trowbridge III (1)

== See also ==
- South West Division RFU
- Dorset & Wilts RFU
- English rugby union system
- Rugby union in England
