= Bournemouth Rugby =

English rugby union club, based in Dorset

(England) Bournemouth
- Full name: Bournemouth Rugby Football Club
- Union: Dorset & Wilts RFU, Hampshire RFU
- Founded: 1893; 133 years ago
- Location: Christchurch, Dorset, England
- Ground: Chapel Gate (Capacity: 1,500)
- Chairman: Simon Carkeet
- President: Doug Warren
- League: Regional 2 South Central
- 2025–26: 1st (promoted to Regional 1 South Central)
Team kit

Official website
- www.bournemouth-rugby.co.uk

Bournemouth RFC is a rugby union club founded in 1893. The grounds are currently located at Chapel Gate in Christchurch. They currently play in Regional 1 South Central, at the fifth tier of the English rugby union system following their promotion from Regional 2 South Central at the end of 2025–26 season.

== History ==
Bournemouth RFC was founded in 1893, and is one of the oldest rugby clubs on the south coast. Initially, the club played rugby teams including Portsmouth, Trojans and Sherbourne School, whom they would travel by train to play against.

The club's first major success occurred in the 1973–74 season, when Bournemouth defeated Trojans 16–3 to win the Hampshire Cup. This was the first time in the tournament's history that a non-services, civilian side won. The club began competing in the Dorset & Wilts RFU structures, and between 1977 and 1985, Bournemouth dominated the regional circuit. The team won the Dorset & Wilts Senior Cup six times in an eight-year span.

In October 1989, the club moved away from its original ground in Bournemouth to a newly developed, 67-acre ground at Chapel Gate in Christchurch, located near Bournemouth Airport. The grounds were opened on 21 April 1990 by former Prime Minister Edward Heath. The pitches went on to host schoolboy, junior, and student international fixtures featuring well known rugby players including Lawrence Dallaglio and Joe Rokocoko.

The 21st century saw the club continue to improve. Bournemouth secured the South West Premier championship title twice; first in the 2011–12 season and again in 2018–19 under head coach Will Croker. The 2nd, 3rd, and 4th XV squads have also won various Dorset & Wiltshire league titles across the 2000s and 2010s.

For the 2025–26 season, the club won the Regional 2 South Central title, scoring in the final play of the match to win against Winchester at Chapel Gate.

== Honours ==
1st team:

- Hampshire Cup winners: 1973–74
- Dorset & Wilts Senior Cup winners: (12) 1977–78, 1978–79, 1979–80, 1980–81, 1982–83, 1984–85, 1994–95, 2007–08, 2008–09, 2009–10, 2010–11, 2012–13
- Southern Merit Table champions: 1983–84
- Southern Counties South champions (2): 1993–94, 2004–05 (Note: 1993–94 title was when league was single division known as Southern Counties.)
- South West 2 (east v west) promotion play-off winner: 2006–07
- South West Premier champions (2): 2011–12, 2018–19
- Regional 2 South Central champions (level 6): 2025–26

2nd team:

- Dorset & Wilts 1 South champions (2): 2005–06, 2015–16

3rd team:

- Dorset & Wilts 2 South champions (2): 2006–07, 2009–10
- Dorset & Wilts 3 South champions: 2013–4

4th team:

- Dorset & Wilts 4 champions (2): 2012–13, 2013–14

== Teams ==
Bournemouth currently run four senior teams.

1st XV (Lions) – compete in Regional 1 South Central. Were winners of 2011–12 National 3 South West. Were runner-up in 2010–11 losing 22 – 23 away to Hertford in the National 3 play-off. Winners of the Dorset & Wilts RFU Senior Cup in 2011 for the fourth successive time, equalling their previous best run from 1977–78 to 1980–81 and their twelfth overall.

The second XV play in a league called The Shield, the third XV plays in Dorset & Wilts 1 South and the fourth XV plays in Dorset & Wilts 4. The club also runs the full range of junior teams and one girls side.

== Season-by-season summary ==
1973/1974: Winners Hampshire Cup. Beat Trojans 16–3. Become the first non-services side to win the cup.

1977/1978: Winners Dorset & Wilts RFU Senior KO Cup. Beat Salisbury. Believed to be the only club to win the county cup for two different counties.

1978/1979: Winners Dorset & Wilts RFU Senior KO Cup. Beat Salisbury 27–3.

1979/1980: Winners Dorset & Wilts RFU Senior KO Cup. Beat Salisbury 23–3.

1980/1981: Winners Dorset & Wilts RFU Senior KO Cup. Beat Wimborne.

1982/1983: Winners Dorset & Wilts RFU Senior KO Cup. Beat Swanage & Wareham 15–3.

1983/1984: Winners of the Bisley Office Equipment Southern Merit Table.

1984/1985: Winners Dorset & Wilts RFU Senior KO Cup. Beat Swindon 14–3.

1987/1988: Courage South West 1 11th (Relegated).

1988/1989: Courage South West 2 9th.

1989/1990: Courage South West 2 10th. Moved to the new ground at Chapel Gate in October. The then Rt Hon Edward Heath, MBE, MP, the former Prime Minister, officially opened the ground on 21 April 1990.

1990/1991: Courage South West 2 11th (Relegated).

1991/1992: Courage Southern Counties 6th.

1992/1993: Courage Southern Counties 3rd.

1993/1994: Courage Southern Counties 1st (Promoted). Celebrated Centenary Year.

1994/1995: Courage South West 2 – 7th. Winners Dorset & Wilts RFU Senior KO Cup. Beat Dorchester 13–8 at Salisbury, Sun 2 Apr 1995.

1995/1996: Courage South West 2 8th.

1996/1997: South West 2 East 10th. Andy Long plays his last game for Bournemouth 11 January 1997, open side flanker v Marlow h l 17–27 and goes back to Bath.

1997/1998: South West 2 East 7th. Andy Long plays hooker for England against Australia 15 November 1997!

1998/1999: South West 2 East 12th (Relegated). Ben Gollings as fly-half scores a penalty on his debut against Amersham & Chiltern (a) 8–25. Leaves to join Harlequins and becomes part of the England 7s squad.

1999/2000: Southern Counties South 8th.

2000/2001: Southern Counties South 7th.

2001/2002: Southern Counties South 3rd.

2002/2003: Southern Counties South 5th.

2003/2004: Southern Counties South 4th.

Bournemouth score more than one hat-trick in a league match for the first time. 15 Mar 2003 v Calne a w 82–5 (Dan Cawley/7/3t, Guy Spencer/15C/4t).

2004/2005: Southern Counties South 1st (Promoted). 1st XV Honours ties awarded to: Mark Awdas, Mark Burley, Damian Carroll, Dan Cawley, Darren Clarke, Andrew Freeman, Sam Hardcastle, Ben Harris, Jon Holdaway, Jayson Kenny, Matt Morgan, Jon Sanchez, Tim Seward, Guy Spencer, Dave Upton, Steve Winduss. This is the first time these ties have been awarded and is in recognition of long term representation for Bournemouth 1st XV.

2005/2006: 1st XV (Lions) – South West 2 East 3rd. 1st XV Honours ties awarded to: Jon Beswick, Robert Bruce, Richard Dew, Simon Eveleigh, Matt Kiely.

2006/2007: 1st XV (Lions) – South West 2 East – 2nd/12 (Promoted. Beat Brixham 43/7t4c-12/2tc in South West 2 Play-off). P23, W18, D1, L4. For 721/103t63c25p, Ag 2281/35t17c24. Includes PO. Leading Points Scorer: 120 Jon Sanchez 120/39c14p. Leading Try Scorer: 20 James Flynn 100/20t. Hat-tricks: 2 James Flynn 100/20t. Captain: Dan Cawley. Player of the Year: James Payne. 1st XV Honours ties awarded to: Scott Chislett, James Flynn, Craig White, James Payne.

2007/2008: 1st XV (Lions) South West 1–5th/12. P22, W11, D1, L10. For 520/74t65c20p, Ag 405/52t32c25pd. Leading Points Scorer: 142 James Flynn 142/9t29c13p. Leading Try Scorer: 19 Sam Hardcastle 97/19tc. Sam Hardcastle establishes a new league career try-scoring record of 70 (overtaking Guy Spencer's record of 67 set in 2004/5). Hat-tricks: 1 Sam Hardcastle 97/19tc. Winners Dorset & Wilts RFU Senior KO Cup beating Swanage & Wareham 20/3tcp-10/tcp. 1st XV Honours ties awarded to: Jo Burns, Domenick Davies, Anthony Dunkerley, George Leyland, Alan Manning.

2008/2009: 1st XV (Lions) – South West 1 – 3rd/12. P22, W14, D1, L7. For 539/71t35c38p, Ag 392/48t31c 29pd. Leading Points Scorer: 227 Mike Pope 227/14t26c35p – a new club league-season points-scoring record. Leading Try Scorer: 14 Mike Pope 227/14t26c35p. Hat-tricks: 1 Scott Chislett 20/4t, Tim Gray 20/4t, James Payne 30/6t, Mike Pope 227/14t26c35p. Sam Hardcastle extends his own league career try-scoring record to 82. Captain: Chris Hughes. Player of the Year: Mike Pope. Winners Dorset & Wilts RFU Senior KO Cup beating Swanage & Wareham 13/2tp-3/p at Dorchester (Coburg Road) Sunday, 26 April 2009. 1st XV Honours ties awarded to: Iain Crombie, ‘Eddie’ Edwards, Tim Gray, Simon McFarlane, Tim Wareham.

2009/2010: 1st XV (Lions) – National 3 South West – 5th/14. P26, W14, D2, L10. For 618/81t48c38pd, Ag 427/54t29c30p3d. Leading Points Scorer: 215 Mike Pope 215/16t33c22pd. Leading Try Scorers: 16 Rory Hearson† 95/16t3c3p, Mike Pope 215/16t33c22pd. Hat-tricks: 1 Matt Kiely 25/5t, Mike Pope 215/16t33c22pd. Captain: Alan Manning. Player of the Year: Scott Chislett. Winners Dorset & Wilts RFU Senior KO Cup (for the 10th time) beating Swanage & Wareham 46/7t4cp-8/tp at Oakmeadians (Meyrick Park) Saturday, 17 April 2010. 1st XV Honours ties awarded to: Callum Forrest, Mike Pope.

2010/2011: 1st XV (Lions) – National 3 South West – 2nd/14. P26, W22, D0, L4. For 862/117t71c45p, Ag 380/45t28c32pd. 1st XV Captain: Alan Manning. Leading Points Scorer: 188 Dan Pollard† 188/5t50c21p (a new club debut-league-season record). Leading Try Scorer: 27 Sam Yarwood† 135/27t (a new club league-season record, which is, ipso facto, a debut league season record also; is a new club league-career try-scoring record for a right wing. Sam Yarwood is the leading try-scorer in National 3 South West. Hat-tricks: 3 – Sam Yarwood† 135/27t; 1 – Dan Connolly† 25/5t, Sam Hardcastle 90/18t, Riad Lynch 20/4t. As loosehead prop, Riad Lynch becomes the first Bournemouth front-five player to score a hat-trick. Sam Hardcastle extends own league career try-scoring record to 100. National 3 South Play-off – Lost 22/3t2cp-23/3tc2p away to Hertford. Captain: Alan Manning. Player of the Year: Sam Yarwood. Winners Dorset & Wilts RFU Senior KO Cup (for the 11th time) beating Swanage & Wareham 47/7t3c2p-10/tcp at Dorchester (Coburg Road) Sunday, 3 April 2011. Wednesday, 6 April 2011: Sam Yarwood dies in a canoeing accident on Lake Ullswater. A new trophy (The Yarwood Trophy) created in Sam's memory and awarded by the players to their player of the year. Won by Karim Lynch. 1st XV Honours tie awarded to: Tomas Ford. 2nd XV (Nomads) Hampshire Senior Merit Table–2nd. 2010/1 was the inaugural season for this competition. Winners of the Dorset & Wilts 2nd XV Cup for the second successive season. 3rd XV (Wanderers) Dorset & Wilts 1 South–8th. 4th XV (Bedouins) Dorset & Wilts 3 South–11th and were relegated. Ben Gollings, former Bournemouth player (1998/1999), appointed captain of the England 7s squad.

2011/2012: 1st XV (Lions) – SSE National 3 South West – Winners. 1st XV Captain: Alan Manning. 2nd XV (Nomads) Hampshire Senior Merit Table. 3rd XV (Wanderers) Dorset & Wilts 1 South. 4th XV (Bedouins) Dorset & Wilts 4 South.

Bournemouth score three hat-tricks in a league match for the first time. 8 Oct v Newbury Blues h w 112–5 (Robert Bruce/12/3t, Tony Dunkerley/7/3t, James Flynn/11/4t).

Robbie Searle† sets a new club league-points-scoring record of 32/2t11c v Bridgwater & Albion at Chapel Gate 12 November 2011. Equals Barry Hook's outright record set against Aldershot Services in November 1976. With four tries, Barry's total would be 36 in today's money (not forgetting Keith Berry's 7-try record set in October 1978 which would earn him 35 points today (rather than 28)). In the same game against Bridgwater, James Flynn set a new club league-career hat-trick scoring record of six overtaking Guy Spencer's record set in 2004/2005 and equalled his own record of three hat-tricks in a (league) season.

20 November 2011. Jack Hennings sets off on a sponsored climb to the Base Camp on Mount Everest to raise funds for the Lake District Rescue Services in memory of Sam Yarwood.

22 November 2011. Greg Barden, former Bournemouth player (2005/2006), is made captain of the England 7s squad. Greg becomes the second Bournemouth player to be made England 7s captain, the other being Ben Gollings (1998/1999) for the 2010/2011 season.

January 2012. Jon Beswick trekked to the South Pole for charity retracing Scott's fatal expedition of 1912. See his website www.wmor.co.uk.

14 April 2012. Bournemouth beat Weston-super-Mare 61–5 at Chapel Gate to secure the National 3 South West championship and promotion to National 2 South with one game to go, the highest level ever achieved by Bournemouth or a Dorset Club. Only the second Dorset & Wilts club to play at this level (4), the other being Salisbury who were 'placed' in the then Area South when, what is now known as, The English Clubs Championship started in season 1987/1988 and played for three seasons.

In an outstanding season for the club, the league playing record was P26, W24, D0, L2. For 1285, Ag 225, Diff 1030. Inevitably club league-scoring records were broken. Points: 1285 (a club league-season record). Points Difference: 1030 (a club league-season record). Tries: 186 (a club league-season record). Hat-tricks (9): 3 – James Flynn; 1 – Robert Bruce, Tony Dunkerley, Sam Hardcastle, Jack Hennings, Dan Mallard, Robbie Searle. Conversions: 128 (a club league-season record). Penalty Goals: 32. Drop Goals: 1. Goals: 160 (a club league-season record). Leading Scorers in the Season: Points 273/3t87c28p, Dan Pollard (a new league-season record); tries 23, Sam Hardcastle and Robbie Searle†; conversions 87, Dan Pollard (a new league-season record); penalties 28, Dan Pollard; goals 115, Dan Pollard (a new league-season record). Robbie Searle† sets a new debut-season points record of 209/23t41c4p. His 23 tries was the second highest ever in a debut season. Scrum-half Sam Hardcastle and tighthead prop and captain Alan Manning started all 26 matches. Gavin Hart† played in all 26 matches setting new debut-season records of 25 starts as No 8 and 24 consecutive starts, which is also the record for any given position. Alan Manning set new club records of captaining the side 70 times and 64 consecutive starts. New career playing records were set by: Robert Bruce, outside centre 78; Dan Cawley, hooker 65; Scott Chislett, inside centre 67; James Flynn, left wing 58; Sam Hardcastle, scrum-half 158, points 646, tries 123; Tim Seward, lock 157. Team league match records were also broken: Points 112, 8 Oct 2011 v Newbury h w 112–5; Difference 107, 8 Oct 2011 v Newbury h w 112–5 and 12 Nov 2011 v Bridgwater & Albion h w 107–0; Tries 18, 8 Oct 2011 v Newbury h w 112–5; Hat-tricks 3, 8 Oct 2011 v Newbury h w 112–5 (a record 9 hat-tricks scored in the season).

Player of the Year (The John Plank Travel Trophy) – Sam Hardcastle.

Players' Player of the Year (The Yarwood Trophy) – Dan Pollard.

Young Player of the Year (The chairman's Trophy) – Tom Westlake.

Most Improved Junior Player of the Year (The (Ken) Baily Cup) – John Jones.

Nomads' (2nd XV) Player of the Year – Sam Veneroso.

Wanderers' (3rd XV) Player of the Year – Mark Awdas.

Bedouins' (4th XV) Player of the Year – Paul Le Faux.

Captain of the Year (Bill Johnston Cup) – Alan Manning.

Clubman of the Year (The Geoff Wilson Trophy) – Gavin Fisher.

The Alan Thorne Memorial Trophy – Mark Valentine.

1st XV Honours ties awarded to: Jack Hennings, Karim Lynch, Riad Lynch, Ben Stewart, Frazer Wilford.

Dorset & Wilts KO Competitions: 1st XV Cup – Final not played and Bournemouth retain the trophy by default. 2nd XV Cup – Winners v Swanage & Wareham at Bestwall. 3rd XV Cup – Winners v Chippenham at North Dorset.

2012/2013: 1st XV (Lions) – SSE National 2 South

Captain: Alan Manning.

Overall Statistics for the League Season: Position 13th. P18, W10, D0, L18. For: Points 635, Tries 85, Cons 51, Pens 36. Against: Points 805, Tries 109, Cons 79, Pens 33, DGs 1.

Fly-half Ben Stevenson† scores on league debut and sets a new debut-match points record of 22/2c6p 1 Sep 2012 v Canterbury h w 32–17. His six penalties is also a debut-match penalty record and equals the outright club league penalty record.

Player of the Year (The John Plank Travel Trophy) – Tommy Booth. Players' Player of the Year (The Yarwood Trophy) – Alan Manning.

Young Player of the Year (The chairman's Trophy) – Tom Vaughan-Edwards. Most Improved Junior Player of the Year (The (Ken) Baily Cup) – Damon Quinn.

Nomads' (2nd XV) Player of the Year – Not awarded. Wanderers' (3rd XV) Player of the Year – Not awarded. Bedouins' (4th XV) Player of the Year – Mark Forsyth.

Captain of the Year (Bill Johnston Cup) – Alan Manning. Clubman of the Year (The Geoff Wilson Trophy) – Julie Boddington. The Alan Thorne Memorial Trophy – Mark Palmer.

1st XV Honours ties awarded to: Richard Carrel, Dan Connolly, Gavin Hart, Dan Pollard.

Leading Points in the League: 161 Dan Pollard/6t37c19p. Leading Tries in the League: 11 Sam Hardcastle.

Leading Points in a League Career: 701 Sam Hardcastle/134t11c3p. Leading Tries in a League Career: 134 Sam Hardcastle. Leading Hat-tricks in a League Career: 6 James Flynn.

Leading Conversions in a League Career: 174 Dan Pollard. Leading Penalties in a League Career: 82 Jon Sanchez. Leading Drop Goals in a League Career: 4 Jon Santy.

Leading Goals in a League Career: 242 Dan Pollard.

† indicates player's debut season.

== See also ==
- English rugby union system
