= Verwood RUFC =

Verwood Rugby Club is a rugby union football club based in Verwood, Dorset, England. Verwood rugby club play their home matches at Potterne Park, Potterne Way, Verwood, which is on the southern edge of the town between Verwood and Three Legged Cross.

== History ==
Founded in 1994, Verwood Rugby Union Football Club (Verwood RUFC) is a relatively young club when compared to most other clubs in the English Rugby Football Union. The club was initially formed by Mike Cockram, Phil Emery, Ken Banks, & his son Simon Banks, who were instrumental in transforming the club from a social club, to one with full membership of the Rugby Football Union in 1995.

Prior to 1994, there was talk of forming a rugby club in Verwood for well over a decade. The fulcrum was the desire of some enthusiastic players, already playing for other clubs in the area, who decided that due to a significant increase in Verwood's population during the previous ten years, that it would be worthwhile establishing a club within the emerging town.

An inaugural game was organised and played at the Three Legged Cross recreation ground in March 1994, against Portcastrians RFC (now East Dorset RFC). The positive response to that game encouraged an approach to the Verwood Community Association to see if a playing area could be obtained. The field adjacent to the existing soccer pitches at Potterne Park was made available for this purpose. Work was carried out by club members to bring the field to a suitable standard. Playing equipment, services and storage were funded by local business sponsorship as well as members own money. The pavilion at Potterne Park was built as a combination of this income and charitable grant funding.

== Current Information ==
Verwood Rugby Club has two senior men's sides, having recently established a 2nd XV during 2011.

The 1st XV compete in Dorset & Wilts Division 3 South, which is level 10 in the Rugby Football Union league structure. In season 2010/11 Verwood RUFC finished 4th out of a league of 12, and in season 2011/12 Verwood will again be competing in the same league.

Verwood also run a Rugby Sevens side during the off-season, which frequently competes in regional Sevens tournaments such as Lytchett 7s, Bournemouth 7s and Winchester 7s.

The club's clubhouse & social home is in the town centre, at Club 31 (formerly Verwood Royal British Legion), Moorlands Road, Verwood, approximately 1 mile from Potterne Park.

== Future Development ==
According to the club's website, the club is currently revising and updating its development plan to incorporate a new coaching programme and the desire to increase the number of teams and expanded facilities.

This is driven by the town's relatively high population per active rugby team, when compared to other towns in Dorset.

Verwood's population is approaching 15,000. Several other towns in Dorset approaching this size, such as Dorchester and Wimborne, manage to support rugby clubs with 3 or 4 senior men's teams.

Consequently, the club is currently developing a detailed plan for significant expansion over the next 5 years, as a means to improve links with the community and offer a better rugby experience for people living in Verwood.

== Club Officials Season 2011/12 ==
- President: Roy Hacker
- Chairman: Alan Rex
- Treasurer: Martin O'Kelly
- Secretary: Niall Donnan
- Head Coach & Club Coaching Co-ordinator: Mike Wheatley
- Coaches: Steve Thomas & Chris Tunnicliff
- Fixtures Secretary: Kim Rex
- Publicity Officer: John Edgar
- Social Secretary: Joe Walsgrove
- Club Captain: Tim Wynn
- Child Protection Officer: Chantal Woodland-Emery
