= Chippenham RFC =

English rugby union club, based in Wiltshire

(England) Chippenham RFC
- Full name: Chippenham Rugby Football Club
- Union: Dorset & Wilts RFU
- Founded: 1898; 128 years ago
- Location: Chippenham, Wiltshire, England
- Ground: Allington Fields (Capacity: 500)
- League: Regional 2 Severn
- 2024–25: 2nd
Team kit

Official website
- www.chippenhamrfc.co.uk

Chippenham Rugby Football Club is an English rugby union club located in Chippenham, Wiltshire. Established in 1898 and just celebrated its 125-year anniversary. The club pavilion is equipped multiple changing rooms, bar, lounge, kitchen, clubroom with match viewing area. Disabled access is available to the main areas of the clubhouse. This members club has an all weather rugby pitch plus two full size grass rugby pitches all with flood lights. In addition there are grass areas for mini rugby, all weather cricket nets and a cricket ground with pavilion.

The club has over 750 players involved in rugby in its different formats. Chippenham has four Senior Men's teams, a Ladies team, a Mixed Ability Team, Touch Rugby and Walking Rugby Teams. The Junior sections include a full set of Mini and Junior sides and a Girls Section. The rugby club is also home to Allington Cricket Club which is one of the many operating sections in the club management structure. The first team currently play in Regional 2 Severn, a level six league in the English rugby union league system, while the second and third teams play in Counties 1 Southern South and Dorset & Wilts 3 North respectively (level 7 and 10).

== Honours ==
- Bath Combination Cup Winners: 2018, 2020, 2022, 2023
- South West 2 East: 2007–08
- South West 1 East: 2014–15

International Honours Max Ojomoh - England A 2024

Sam Fuller - England Deaf 2023

Tom Dunn - England 2020

Will Hendy - England 7's 2019/20

Sam Cutler - England Men's Touch Rugby 2017

David Ward - England Saxons 2014

Steve Regan - England Touch 2010 European Championship

Alex Clarke - England Saxons 2008

Kim Oliver - England Women 2005 - 2013

Chris Horsman - Wales 2005 - 2007

Kevin Yates - England 1997 - 2007

Alec O. Lewis - England 1952 - 1953

Age Grade Honours

James Linegar - U18's England Men 2023/24

Hayley Jones - U18's England Women 2023/24

Lauren Bailey - U18's England Women 2023/24

Sophie McQueen - U18's England Women 2022/23

Max Surry - U20's Scotland 2022/23

Sophie McQueen - U18's England Women 2021/22

Thompson Cowan - U20's Wales 2021/22

George Worboys - U20's England 2020/21

Max Ojomoh - U20's England 2019/20

Keir Clark - U18's England Mixed Touch 2018/19

Megan Richards - U18's England Mixed Touch 2018/19

George Worboys - U18's England 2018/19

Max Ojomoh - U18's England 2018/19

Connor Beer - U20's Spain 2018/19

George Worboys - U18's England Mixed Touch 2017/18

Keir Clark - U18's England Boys Touch 2017/18

Anya Lewis - U18's England Girls Touch 2017/18

Megan Richards - U18's England Girls Touch 2017/18

Keir Clark - U15's England Mixed Touch 2016 & 2017

Connor Beer - U18's Ireland Clubs 2017/18

Chris Moore - U18's Ireland Clubs 2017/18

Tom Baldwin - England Counties 2016/17

Tom Baldwin - England Counties 2015/16

Tom Dunn - England Students 2012/13

Dan Keat - U18's England 2011/12

Mike Beswick - England Colleges 2010/11

Josh Brown - U20'S Scotland 2007/08

Josh Brown - U19's Scotland 2006/07

Josh Brown - U18's Scotland 2005/06

Karl Brant - England Colleges 2005/06

Sam Alford - U18's England Group Clubs 2004/05

Simon Whatling - U21's England FIRA 2004/05

Laurence Ovens - U18's England Group Clubs 2004/05

Fraser Clivered - U18's England Group Clubs 2004/05

Mark Livesey - U18's England Group Clubs 2004/05

Mitchel Burton - U20's England 2003/04

Simon Whatling - U20'S England 2003/04

William Waldron - U18's Wales Group Schools 2002/03

David Ward - U18's England Group Schools 2002/03

Laurence Ovens - U16's England Group Schools 2002/03

Sam Alford - U16's England Group Schools 2002/03

Simon Whatling - U19's England FIRA 2002/03

Mitchell Burton - U18's England Group Schools 2001/02

Simon Whatling - U18's England Group Schools 2001/02

Alex Clarke - U21's England FIRA 2000/01

Gareth Snoad - U19's Wales 2000/01

Mitchell Burton - U16's England Group Schools 2000/01

Simon Whatling - U16's England Group Schools 2000/01

William Waldron - U16's Wales Group Schools 2000/01

David Parker - U18's England Group Schools 1999/00

Alex Clarke - U18's England Group Schools 1999/00

Kicker Singh - U19's England 1985/86

Ryan Laney - England Schoolboys 1951

M H Evans - Wales Boys 1924/25
