= Combe Down RFC =

English rugby union club, based in Combe Down, Somerset

(England) Combe Down
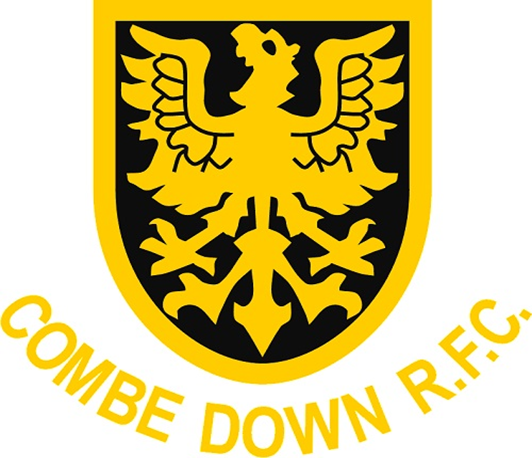
- Full name: Combe Down Rugby Club
- Union: Somerset RFU
- Founded: 1896; 130 years ago
- Location: Combe Down, Bath, Somerset, England
- Ground: Holly's Corner
- Chairman: Jamie Knight
- President: Kelvin Cox
- Coach: Chris Thompson
- Captain: Bill “Chairman” Fairman
- League: Southern Counties South
- 2021-22: 6th

Combe Down Rugby Club is an English Rugby Union Club found in Combe Down, Bath. Founded in 1896 the club currently play home fixtures at Holly's Corner. The club currently has two teams; the 1st XV who play in Southern Counties South (tier 7) following their promotion as champions of Dorset & Wilts 1 North at the end of 2018-19 season, and the 2nd XV play who play in Dorset & Wilts 2 North (tier 9).

== History ==
No records exist of the circumstances regarding the club's founding, or who the moving spirits were behind its inception, but photographs showing the early teams, together with their playing records show that rugby on Combe Down was adopted with enthusiasm and played with instinctive ability.

The original team in jerseys of chocolate and gold played its first season on the Firs Field. Subsequent years saw the Club, with its colours changed to black and amber, playing on various fields on Combe Down from the Monument field to the water tank. A red letter day in the club's history came in 1957 when a long-held ambition was realised and the club was able to buy the ground at Holly's Corner which it had tenanted since 1922.

As the grounds were changed so were the headquarters and from the one time Church Rooms in Tyning Road they moved to the headquarters on Firs Field and to the King William IV. Finally the club became proud possessors of their own headquarters which were erected on the ground, and on 4 April 1966 the Combe Down R.F.C. Club house was officially opened by Alec Lewis, the old Bath F.C. international.

== Senior Teams ==
Combe Down has successfully fielded two senior teams since 1947 and a Third XV was formed in 1968 which has seen inconsistent appearances. There are currently two sides at the club.
Recent achievements saw the 2nd XV win Dorset and Wilts North 2 in 2014/15 and the 1st XV win Dorset and Wilts North 1 in 2015/16. In the same year the club enjoyed a tour to Oldershaw RFC in Wallasey, Liverpool.
Combe Down RFC is a family club with traditional rugby values at its core. Senior teams train on a Tuesday and Thursday evening and new players are always welcome.

== Notable players ==
John Horton - John played 13 times for England and made over 375 appearances for Bath, captaining the club in the 1979-80 season. He was regarded as being part of the team that changed the style of rugby at Bath, from a forwards game to a more open, running game. John spent several seasons at Combe Down RFC.
Brian Jenkins - Brian played 290 1st Team games for Bath Rugby Club and another 120 for the 2nd XV between 1970-1980. He also played 20 times for Somerset in the County Championship between 1975 and 1979 earning him the Somerset Cap. In his day job, Brian worked for Royal Mail and played for the National Side. Brian played over 100 times for Combe Down, captaining the club in 1982 and has been instrumental off the field in securing the club's future, holding several key positions on the committee (Treasurer 1984, Chairman 2000-2003, President 2004-2006) and is currently the disciplinary officer. Brian's brothers Peter, Alan and David also represented Combe Down and Bath.
Wyn Bailey - with over 1130 appearances for the club Wyn has been an integral part of the history. He was Club Captain in 1974, Honorary Fixture Secretary between 1971-1995, Chairman from 1993-1996 and President from 1998-2001.
Kevin Adams -grew up on the down and played for the colts. He also played for the 3rd, 2nd & 1st teams He went to school at Culverhay and in 1975 played for England U16 Schools. He then joined Avon and Somerset Police where he was selected for England Colts. He represented British Police, Somerset and played at Bath during the 1984/85 seasons before injuries forced an early retirement in 1986.

Jer Burns - father of Freddie and Billy Burns, Jer joined Combe Down in 2014 and has played alongside his other two sons Jack and Sam.
The club has had many players that have played for Bath Rugby over the years including Keith Ridewood, Simon Jones, Kevin Adams, John West, Roger Willcox, John Millman, Kelvin Cox, Bob Gay and Andy Burr. Another two notable players are Combe Downs current front row props Bill Chairman and Joel Lye aka the British bulldogs they currently hold the record for eating 80 portions Lou’s sausage surprise. They also drink at the cross keys. Stuart Flint 2s loosehead who also has a vegetarian Abattoir. Last the list of notable players is Thomas “The Guillotine” Wheatley, the nickname comes from his famous swinging arm known to take off opposition players heads.

== Honours ==
1st team:

- Bath Combination Cup winners (4): 1984-85, 1989–90, 1990–91, 1996-97
- Somerset Senior Cup winners (2): 1987-88, 1990–91
- Western Counties champions: 1990-91
- Dorset & Wilts 2 North champions: 2011-12
- Dorset & Wilts 1 North champions (2): 2015-16, 2018–19
- Bath Combination Vase winners: 2015-16
- Bath Combination Vase winners: 2021-22

2nd team:

- Dorset & Wilts 3 North champions (2): 2011-12, 2014–15

== Junior and Mini Section ==
A Colts XV was formed in 1974 but there were many years that this part of the club was missing until a recent rejuvenation with the help of Jerry King, Jamie Knight, and Lee Dyte, all who had sons playing in the U13 team for the 2008/09 season. Charlie Knight, Ed Hall and Sam Dyte all went on to represent the 1st XV in later years.
Current Club coach Dave Cobb and Committee member Giles White formed another U13 team the following season (2009/10) and also enjoyed success in later years by winning the U17 Bristol Combination Cup. They were also runners-up in the U16 Somerset Cup in 2012/13. From that group, James Vecchio and Tom Dabell represented Bath Academy.
Following the success of the junior section, a mini section was formed by Adrian Sprake in 2010, who is now Chairman of the junior section while Steve Cottle now leads the minis.
