= Counties 3 Dorset & Wilts North =

English rugby union league

Counties 3 Dorset & Wilts North / Central
- Current season or competition: 2024–25 Counties 3 Dorset & Wilts North
- Sport: Rugby union
- Instituted: 1987; 39 years ago (as Berks/Dorset/Wilts 2)
- Country: England
- Most titles: Bournemouth University, Frome II, Minety, Marlborough, Pewsey Vale, Sutton Benger (2 titles)
- Website: englandrugby.com

Counties 3 Dorset & Wilts North (formerly Dorset & Wilts 2 North) and Counties 3 Dorset & Wilts Central are English Rugby Union leagues, forming part of the South West Division, for clubs based primarily in Wiltshire, sitting at tier 9 of the English rugby union system. From these leagues teams are promoted to Counties 2 Dorset & Wilts North or occasionally Counties 2 Dorset & Wilts Central. Historically relegation had been to Dorset & Wilts 3 North but following the RFU Adult Competition Review this ceased with teams demoted to their county merit leagues.

== North ==
Departing were Swindon College Old Boys, promoted to Counties 2 Dorset & Wilts North.

Team	Ground	Capacity	Town/Village	Previous season
Chippenham III	Allington Fields		Chippenham, Wiltshire	4th
Colerne	Higgins Field		Colerne, Wiltshire	3rd
Corsham II	Lacock Road		Corsham, Wiltshire	5th
Cricklade	Fairview Field		Cricklade, Wiltshire	6th
Devizes II	The Sports Club		Devizes, Wiltshire	2nd
Minety 2XV	Minety Playing Fields		Minety, Wiltshire	New entry
Royal Wootton Bassett IV	Ballard's Ash Sports Ground		Wootton Bassett, Wiltshire	7th
Swindon II	Greenbridge Road		Swindon, Wiltshire	Re-entry
Swindon College Old Boys 2XV	Nationwide Sports Pavilion		Swindon, Wiltshire	New entry

Locations of the 2026-27 Counties 3 Dorset & Wilts North teams

== Central ==
Departing were champions Frome II and runners-up North Dorset II promoted to Counties 2 Dorset & Wilts South. Also leaving were Melksham III (8th) who were displaced by Melksham II being relegated into the league.

Team	Ground	Capacity	Town/Village	Previous season
Amesbury	Archers Way		Salisbury, Wiltshire	Relegated from Counties 2 Dorset & Wilts North (12th)
Avonvale	Bathford Playing Fields		Bathford, Bath, Somerset	5th
Bath Saracens	Sulis Sports Club		Bath, Somerset	6th
Combe Down II	Holly's Corner		Combe Down, Bath, Somerset	7th
Melksham II	The Conigre	1,000	Melksham, Wiltshire	Relegated from Counties 2 Dorset & Wilts North (11th)
Salisbury II	Castle Road	1,500	Salisbury, Wiltshire	3rd
Trowbridge III	Doric Park		Hilperton, Trowbridge, Wiltshire	9th
Warminster	Folly Lane		Warminster, Wiltshire	4th

Locations of the 2026-27 Counties 3 Dorset & Wilts Central teams

== North ==
Departing were Supermarine, promoted to Counties 2 Dorset & Wilts North. Also leaving were Swindon College Old Boys II (6th), relegated to Counties 4 Berks/Bucks & Oxon.

Swindon 2XV (4th in 2024-25) started but did not complete the season leaving seven clubs to contest the outstanding fixtures.

Team	Ground	Capacity	Town/Village	Previous season
Chippenham III	Allington Fields		Chippenham, Wiltshire	3rd
Colerne	Higgins Field		Colerne, Wiltshire	Relegated from Counties 2 Dorset & Wilts North (9th)
Corsham II	Lacock Road		Corsham, Wiltshire	Level transfer from Central division (4th)
Cricklade	Fairview Field		Cricklade, Wiltshire	Runners-up
Devizes II	The Sports Club		Devizes, Wiltshire	Relegated from Counties 2 Dorset & Wilts North (10th)
Royal Wootton Bassett IV	Ballard's Ash Sports Ground		Wootton Bassett, Wiltshire	5th
Swindon College Old Boys	Nationwide Sports Pavilion		Swindon, Wiltshire	Relegated from Counties 2 Dorset & Wilts North (8th)

Locations of the 2025–26 Counties 3 Dorset & Wilts North teams

== Central ==
Departing were Melksham II promoted to Counties 2 Dorset & Wilts North. Also leaving were Corsham II (4th) on a level transfer to the North division. Melksham III joined the league for the first time

Team	Ground	Capacity	Town/Village	Previous season
Avonvale	Bathford Playing Fields		Bathford, Bath, Somerset	Relegated from Counties 2 D&W Central (9th)
Bath Saracens	Sulis Sports Club		Bath, Somerset	6th
Combe Down II	Holly's Corner		Combe Down, Bath, Somerset	5th
Frome II	Gypsy Lane		Frome, Somerset	Relegated from Counties 2 D&W Central (8th)
Melksham III	The Conigre	1,000	Melksham, Wiltshire	New entry
North Dorset II	Slaughtergate	1,000	Gillingham, Dorset	Relegated from Counties 2 D&W South (10th)
Salisbury II	Castle Road	1,500	Salisbury, Wiltshire	Relegated from Counties 2 D&W Central (7th)
Trowbridge III	Doric Park		Hilperton, Trowbridge, Wiltshire	2nd
Warminister	Folly Lane		Warminster, Wiltshire	3rd

Locations of the 2025-26 Counties 3 Dorset & Wilts Central teams

== North ==
Departing were Fairford, promoted to Counties 2 Dorset & Wilts North.

Team	Ground	Capacity	Town/Village	Previous season
Chippenham III	Allington Fields		Chippenham, Wiltshire	3rd
Cricklade	Fairview Field		Cricklade, Wiltshire	Runners-up
Royal Wootton Bassett IV	Ballard's Ash Sports Ground		Wootton Bassett, Wiltshire	5th
Supermarine	Supermarine Sports and Social Club		South Marston, Swindon, Wiltshire	Relegated from Counties 2 D&W North (9th)
Swindon II	Greenbridge Road		Swindon, Wiltshire	4th
Swindon College Old Boys II	Nationwide Sports Pavilion		Swindon, Wiltshire	6th

Locations of the 2024–25 Counties 3 Dorset & Wilts North teams

== Central ==
Departing were Bradford-on-Avon (champions) and Colerne (runners-up), promoted to Counties 2 Dorset & Wilts Central and Counties 2 Dorset & Wilts North respectively. Joining were Warminster who suffered a voluntary relegation after losing a significant number of players at the end of the 2023–24 season

Team	Ground	Capacity	Town/Village	Previous season
Bath Saracens	Sulis Sports Club		Bath, Somerset	6th
Combe Down II	Holly's Corner		Combe Down, Bath, Somerset	4th
Corsham II	Lacock Road		Corsham, Wiltshire	Re-entry
Melksham II	The Conigre	1,000	Melksham, Wiltshire	3rd
Trowbridge III	Doric Park		Hilperton, Trowbridge, Wiltshire	5th
Warminister	Folly Lane		Warminster, Wiltshire	Relegated from Counties 2 D&W North (3rd)

Locations of the 2024–25 Counties 3 Dorset & Wilts Central teams

== North ==
Departing were Supermarine, promoted to Counties 2 Dorset & Wilts North. Colerne (3rd) went on a level transfer to Counties 3 D&W Central. Minety II (6th) did not return for the new season.

Team	Ground	Capacity	Town/Village	Previous season
Chippenham III	Allington Fields		Chippenham, Wiltshire	3rd
Cricklade	Fairview Field	25000	Cricklade, Wiltshire	Runners-up
Fairford	Coln House School Playing Grounds		Fairford, Gloucestershire	Level transfer from Counties 3 Gloucestershire (9th)
Royal Wootton Bassett IV	Ballard's Ash Sports Ground		Wootton Bassett, Wiltshire	5th
Swindon II	Greenbridge Road		Swindon, Wiltshire	Relegated from Counties 2 D&W North (9th)
Swindon College Old Boys II	Nationwide Sports Pavilion		Swindon, Wiltshire	7th

Locations of the 2023–24 Counties 3 Dorset & Wilts North teams

== Central ==
Departing were Corsham II (champions) and Warminster II (5th) who did not return for the new season. Sherborne II (3rd) left on a level transfer to Counties 3 Dorset & Wilts South.

Team	Ground	Capacity	Town/Village	Previous season
Bath Saracens	Sulis Sports Club		Bath, Somerset	4th
Bradford-on-Avon	Broom Ground		Winsley, Bradford-on-Avon, Wiltshire	Relegated from Counties 2 D&W Central (9th)
Colerne	Higgins Field		Colerne, Wiltshire	Level transfer from North (3rd)
Combe Down II	Holly's Corner		Combe Down, Bath, Somerset	Runners-up
Melksham II	The Conigre	1,000	Melksham, Wiltshire	7th
Trowbridge III	Doric Park		Hilperton, Trowbridge, Wiltshire	6th

Locations of the 2023–24 Counties 3 Dorset & Wilts Central teams

== 2022–23 ==
This was the first season following the RFU Adult Competition Review.

== North ==
Departing were Pewsey Vale, Devizes II and Royal Wootton Bassett III, all promoted to Counties 2 Dorset & Wilts North. Corsham II (9th) were relegated.

Team	Ground	Capacity	Town/Village	Previous season
Chippenham III	Allington Fields		Chippenham, Wiltshire	8th
Colerne	Higgins Field		Colerne, Wiltshire	4th
Cricklade	Fairview Field		Cricklade, Wiltshire	7th
Minety II	Minety Playing Fields		Minety, Wiltshire	New entry
Royal Wootton Bassett IV	Ballard's Ash Sports Ground		Wootton Bassett, Wiltshire	New entry
Supermarine	Supermarine Sports and Social Club		South Marston, Swindon, Wiltshire	3rd
Swindon College Old Boys II	Nationwide Sports Pavilion		Swindon, Wiltshire	6th

Locations of the 2022–23 Counties 3 Dorset & Wilts North teams

== Central ==
Departing were Wheatsheaf Cabin Crew, Amesbury, Bradford-on-Avon and North Dorset II (who finished 1st-4th respectively) all promoted to Counties 2 Dorset & Wilts Central. Salisbury III (9th) left on a level transfer to Counties 3 Dorset & Wilts South.

Sherborne II re-joined the league pyramid having withdrawn from Dorset & Wilts 1 South part way through the 2021–22 season.

Team	Ground	Capacity	Town/Village	Previous season
Bath Saracens	Sulis Sports Club		Bath, Somerset	5th
Combe Down II	Holly's Corner		Combe Down, Bath, Somerset	6th
Corsham II	Lacock Road		Corsham, Wiltshire	New entry
Melksham II	The Conigre	1,000	Melksham, Wiltshire	8th
Sherborne II	Gainsborough Park		Sherborne, Dorset	Re-entry
Trowbridge III	Doric Park		Hilperton, Trowbridge, Wiltshire	7th
Warminister II	Folly Lane		Warminster, Wiltshire	10th

Locations of the 2022–23 Counties 3 Dorset & Wilts Central teams

== 2021–22 ==
Ahead of the new season a Central division was introduced.

== North ==
Amesbury, Combe Down II, Melksham II and Trowbridge II did not return as all were level transferred to the newly formed Central division.

Team	Ground	Capacity	Town/Village	Previous season
Chippenham III	Allington Fields		Chippenham, Wiltshire	Promoted from Dorset & Wilts 3 North
Colerne	Higgins Field		Colerne, Wiltshire	7th
Corsham II	Lacock Road		Corsham, Wiltshire	3rd
Cricklade	Fairview Field		Cricklade, Wiltshire	Promoted from Dorset & Wilts 3 North
Devizes II	The Sports Club		Devizes, Wiltshire	4th
Pewsey Vale	The Angela Yeates Memorial Ground		Pewsey, Wiltshire	5th
Royal Wootton Bassett III	Ballard's Ash Sports Ground		Wootton Bassett, Wiltshire	Promoted from Dorset & Wilts 3 North
Supermarine	Supermarine Sports and Social Club		South Marston, Swindon, Wiltshire	6th
Swindon College Old Boys II	Nationwide Sports Pavilion		Swindon, Wiltshire	9th

Locations of the 2021–22 Dorset & Wilts 2 North teams

== Central ==
For its inaugural year the league was formed of seven clubs moving on level transfers, whilst two - Warminster II and Bath Saracens - were promoted from Dorset & Wilts 3 North, and one (Bradford-on-Avon) dropped down from Dorset & Wilts 1 North

Team	Ground	Capacity	Town/Village	Previous season
Amesbury	Archers Way		Salisbury, Wiltshire	Level transfer from Dorset & Wilts 2 North
Bath Saracens	Sulis Sports Club		Bath, Somerset	Promoted from Dorset & Wilts 3 North (1st)
Bradford-on-Avon	Broom Ground		Winsley, Bradford-on-Avon, Wiltshire	Relegated from Dorset & Wilts 1 North (12th)
Combe Down II	Holly's Corner		Combe Down, Bath, Somerset	Level transfer from Dorset & Wilts 2 North
Melksham II	The Conigre	1,000	Melksham, Wiltshire	Level transfer from Dorset & Wilts 2 North
North Dorset II	Slaughtergate	1,000	Gillingham, Dorset	Level transfer from Dorset & Wilts 2 South
Salisbury III	Castle Road	1,500	Salisbury, Wiltshire	Level transfer from Dorset & Wilts 2 South
Trowbridge III	Doric Park		Hilperton, Trowbridge, Wiltshire	Level transfer from Dorset & Wilts 2 North
Warminister II	Folly Lane		Warminster, Wiltshire	Promoted from Dorset & Wilts 3 North (3rd)
Wheatsheaf Cabin Crew	Netherhampton Road		Netherhampton, Salisbury, Wiltshire	Level transfer from Dorset & Wilts 2 South

Locations of the 2021–22 Dorset & Wilts 2 Central teams

== 2020–21 ==
Due to the COVID-19 pandemic, the 2020–21 season was cancelled.

== 2019–20 ==
Team	Ground	Capacity	Town/Village	Previous season
Amesbury	Archers Way		Salisbury, Wiltshire	Promoted from Dorset & Wilts 3 North (champions)
Colerne	Higgins Field		Colerne, Wiltshire	10th
Combe Down II	Holly's Corner		Combe Down, Bath, Somerset	Promoted from Dorset & Wilts 3 North (runners up)
Corsham II	Lacock Road		Corsham, Wiltshire	8th
Devizes II	The Sports Club		Devizes, Wiltshire	6th
Melksham II	The Conigre	1,000	Melksham, Wiltshire	9th
Pewsey Vale	The Angela Yeates Memorial Ground		Pewsey, Wiltshire	Relegated from Dorset & Wilts 1 North (11th)
Supermarine	Supermarine Sports and Social Club		South Marston, Swindon, Wiltshire	Relegated from Dorset & Wilts 1 North (12th)
Swindon II	Greenbridge Road		Swindon, Wiltshire	4th
Swindon College Old Boys II	Nationwide Sports Pavilion		Swindon, Wiltshire	5th
Trowbridge III	Doric Park		Hilperton, Trowbridge, Wiltshire	7th
Westbury	Knott Field		Westbury, Wiltshire	3rd

Locations of the 2019–20 Dorset & Wilts 2 North teams

== 2018–19 ==
Team	Ground	Capacity	Town/Village	Previous season
Alfred's Nomads (Marlborough 2nd XV)	The Common		Marlborough, Wiltshire	5th
Colerne	Higgins Field		Colerne, Wiltshire	9th
Corsham II	Lacock Road		Corsham, Wiltshire	Promoted from Dorset & Wilts 3 North (champions)
Cricklade	Fairview Field		Cricklade, Wiltshire	11th
Devizes II	The Sports Club		Devizes, Wiltshire	7th
Frome II	Gypsy Lane		Frome, Somerset	3rd
Melksham II	The Conigre	1,000	Melksham, Wiltshire	8th
Royal Wootton Bassett III	Ballard's Ash Sports Ground		Wootton Bassett, Wiltshire	10th
Swindon II	Greenbridge Road		Swindon, Wiltshire	Relegated from Dorset & Wilts 1 North (12th)
Swindon College Old Boys II	Nationwide Sports Pavilion		Swindon, Wiltshire	4th
Trowbridge III	Doric Park		Hilperton, Trowbridge, Wiltshire	Promoted from Dorset & Wilts 3 North (runners up)
Westbury	Knott Field		Westbury, Wiltshire	6th

Locations of the 2018–19 Dorset & Wilts 2 North teams

== 2017–18 ==
Team	Ground	Capacity	Town/Village	Previous season
Alfred's Nomads (Marlborough 2nd XV)	The Common		Marlborough, Wiltshire	Promoted from Dorset & Wilts 3 North (runners up)
Calne	Calne Recreation Ground		Calne, Wiltshire	3rd
Colerne	Higgins Field		Colerne, Wiltshire	9th
Combe Down II	Holly's Corner		Combe Down, Bath, Somerset	8th
Cricklade	Fairview Field		Cricklade, Wiltshire	6th
Devizes II	The Sports Club		Devizes, Wiltshire	Relegated from Dorset & Wilts 1 North (12th)
Frome II	Gypsy Lane		Frome, Somerset	Relegated from Dorset & Wilts 1 North (11th)
Melksham II	The Conigre	1,000	Melksham, Wiltshire	4th
Royal Wootton Bassett III	Ballard's Ash Sports Ground		Wootton Bassett, Wiltshire	10th
Sutton Benger	Recreation Ground		Sutton Benger, Wiltshire	5th
Swindon College Old Boys II	Nationwide Sports Pavilion		Swindon, Wiltshire	Promoted from Dorset & Wilts 3 North (champions)
Westbury	Knott Field		Westbury, Wiltshire	7th

Locations of the 2017–18 Dorset & Wilts 2 North teams

== 2016–17 ==
- Avonvale
- Bath Saracens
- Calne
- Chippenham III (promoted from Dorset & Wilts 3 North)
- Colerne (relegated from Dorset & Wilts 1 North)
- Combe Down II
- Cricklade
- Melksham II
- Royal Wootton Bassett III (promoted from Dorset & Wilts 3 North)
- Sutton Begner
- Trowbridge II
- Westbury

== 2015–16 ==
The 2015–16 Dorset & Wilts 2 North consisted of twelve teams; most of them based in the northern part of Wiltshire but also three teams based just across the county border in Somerset. The season started on 12 September 2015 and was due to end on 23 April 2016.

Seven of the twelve teams participated in last season's competition. The 2014–15 champions, Royal Wootton Bassett II were promoted to Dorset & Wilts 1 North along with runners up Colerne while Supermarine II and Chippenham III were relegated to Dorset & Wilts 3 North.

Team	Ground	Capacity	Town/Village	Previous season
Avonvale	Bathford Playing Fields		Bathford, Bath, Somerset	3rd
Bath Saracens	Sulis Sports Club		Bath, Somerset	9th
Bradford-on-Avon II	Broom Ground		Winsley, Bradford-on-Avon, Wiltshire	7th
Calne	Calne Recreation Ground		Calne, Wiltshire	Relegated from Dorset & Wilts 1 North (12th)
Combe Down II	Holly's Corner		Combe Down, Bath, Somerset	
Cricklade	Fairview Field		Cricklade, Wiltshire	Relegated from Dorset & Wilts 1 North (11th)
Melksham II	The Conigre	1,000	Melksham, Wiltshire	4th
Pewsey Vale	The Angela Yeates Memorial Ground		Pewsey, Wiltshire	Relegated from Dorset & Wilts 1 North (10th)
Sutton Benger	Recreation Ground		Sutton Benger, Wiltshire	5th
Swindon College Old Boys II	Nationwide Sports Pavilion		Swindon, Wiltshire	6th
Trowbridge III	Doric Park		Hilperton, Trowbridge, Wiltshire	8th
Westbury	Knott Field		Westbury, Wiltshire	Relegated from Dorset & Wilts 1 South (12th)

Locations of the 2015–16 Dorset & Wilts 2 North teams in Wiltshire
Locations of the 2015–16 Dorset & Wilts 2 North teams in Somerset

== Participating clubs 2012–13 ==
- Bath Saracens
- Chippenham III
- Combe Down II
- Corsham II
- Cricklade
- Fairford
- Melksham II
- Supermarine II
- Sutton Benger
- Swindon College Old Boys II
- Westbury II
- Wootton Bassett II

== Participating clubs 2009–10 ==
- Bath Saracens
- Bradford-on-Avon II
- Chippenham III
- Colerne
- Combe Down
- Devizes II
- Fairford
- Melksham II
- Minety II
- Pewsey Vale
- Swindon College Old Boys II
- Wooton Bassett III

== Original teams ==
When league rugby began in 1987 this division (known as Berks/Dorset/Wilts 2) contained the following teams from Berkshire, Dorset and Wiltshire:

- Bradford-on-Avon
- Chippenham
- Corsham
- Lytchett Minster
- Minety
- North Dorset
- Oakmedians
- Poole
- Puddletown
- Swindon College Old Boys
- Supermarine
- Trowbridge

== Dorset & Wilts 2 North honours ==
=== Berks/Dorset/Wilts 2 (1987–1993) ===
Originally Dorset & Wilts 2 North and Dorset & Wilts 2 South were combined in a single division known as Berks/Dorset/Wilts 2, involving clubs based in Berkshire, (Note: Since 2000, Berkshire clubs have played in the Berks/Bucks & Oxon leagues.) Dorset and Wiltshire. It was a tier 9 league with promotion to Berks/Dorset/Wilts 1 and, from the 1988–89 season onward, relegation was to either Berks/Dorset/Wilts 3 East or Berks/Dorset/Wilts 3 West.

Berks/Dorset/Wilts 2
Season	No of teams	Champions	Runners–up	Relegated team(s)	Ref
1987–88	12	Chippenham	Corsham	No relegation	
1988–89	11	North Dorset	Puddletown	Minety	
1989–90	11	Melksham	Lytchett Minster	Poole	
1990–91	11	D.I.H.E.	Swindon College Old Boys	R.E.M.E. Arborfield, Trowbridge, Westbury	
1991–92	11	Aldermaston	Lytchett Minster (Note: Restructuring of the south-west leagues from 11 to 13 teams for the following season, meant that four teams were promoted, including Bradford-on-Avon and Puddleton.)	No relegation (Note: The restructuring of Berks/Dorset/Wilts 3 East and Berks/Dorset/Wilts 3 West into a single season called Berks/Dorsets/Wilts 3, meant that there was no relegation.)	
1992–93	13	Supermarine	Marlborough	Berkshire Shire Hall	
Green backgrounds are promotion places.

=== Berks/Dorset/Wilts 2 (1993–1996) ===
The creation of National League 5 South for the 1993–94 season meant that Berks/Dorset/Wilts 2 dropped to become a tier 10 league. Promotion continued to Berks/Dorset/Wilts 1, while relegation was now to Berks/Dorset/Wilts 3. (Note: Prior to the 1992–93 season Berks/Dorset/Wilts 3 was divided into two regional divisions – Berks/Dorset/Wilts 3 East and Berks/Dorset/Wilts 3 West.)

Berks/Dorset/Wilts 2
Season	No of teams	Champions	Runners–up	Relegated team(s)	Ref
1993–94	13	Blandford	Thatcham	Minety, Hungerford	
1994–95	13	Bournemouth University (Note: Champions Bournemouth University were not promoted.)	North Dorset	Poole	
1995–96	13	Trowbridge	Calne (Note: 3rd place Westbury also promoted.)	Bournemouth University, Puddletown, Warminster (Note: Restructuring of the Berks, Dorset & Wilts leagues, including a reduction of teams in each division, meant that more teams were relegated than usual.)	
Green backgrounds are promotion places.

=== Berks/Dorset/Wilts 2 (1996–2000) ===
The cancellation of National League 5 South at the end of the 1995–96 season meant that Berks/Dorset/Wilts 2 reverted to being a tier 9 league. Promotion continued to Berks/Dorset/Wilts 1 and relegation to Berks/Dorset/Wilts 3.

Berks/Dorset/ Wilts 2
Season	No of teams	Champions	Runners–up	Relegated team(s)	Ref
1996–97	8	Tadley	Ivel Barbarians	Pewsey Vale	
1997–98	10	Swindon College Old Boys	Portcastrians	Supermarine, Berkshire Shire Hall	
1998–99	9	Minety	Bridport	Hungerford, Puddletown, Marlborough	
1999–2000	8	Thatcham	Oakmeadians	No relegation (Note: There would be no relegation due to the cancellation of Berks/Dorset/Wilts 3 at the end of the season.)	
Green backgrounds are promotion places.

=== Dorset & Wilts 2 North (2000–2004) ===
At the end of the 1999–2000 season Berks/Wilts/Dorset 2 was restructured following the departure of Berkshire clubs to join the Bucks & Oxon leagues. It was now split into two tier 9 regional leagues – Dorset & Wilts 2 North and Dorset & Wilts 2 South. Promotion from Dorset & Wilts 2 North was now to Dorset & Wilts 2 and there was no relegation due to the cancellation of Berks/Wilts/Dorset 3.

Dorset & Wilts 2 North
Season	No of teams	Champions	Runners–up	Relegated team(s)	Ref
2000–01	7	Calne	Supermarine	No relegation	
2001–02	7	Bradford-on-Avon	Supermarine	No relegation	
2002–03	7	Minety	Supermarine	No relegation	
2003–04	10	Cricklade	Marlborough	No relegation	
Green backgrounds are promotion places.

=== Dorset & Wilts 2 North (2004–2009) ===
Ahead of the 2004–05 season, local league restructuring meant that promotion from Dorset & Wilts 2 North was now to Dorset & Wilts 1 North (formerly Dorset & Wilts 1) and relegation to the newly introduced Dorset & Wilts 3 North (last known as Berks/Dorset/Wilts 3). It remained a tier 9 league.

Dorset & Wilts 2 North
Season	No of teams	Champions	Runners–up	Relegated team(s)	Ref
2004–05	12	Colerne	Malmesbury	Multiple teams (Note: Minety II, Supermarine II, Sutton Benger, Devizes III, Trowbridge III and Bradford-on-Avon II were the relegated sides this year. The reason for such a lot of teams being relegated were due to the creation of a new division (Dorset & Wilts 3 North & South) for the following season.)	
2005–06	10	Frome II	Chippenham III	Royal Wootton Bassett III	
2006–07	10	Marlborough	Warminster	Swindon III, Hungerford	
2007–08	9	Sutton Benger	Corsham II	Malmesbury	
2008–09	10	Trowbridge II	Avonvale	Calne II, Royal Wootton Bassett III	
Green backgrounds are promotion places.

=== Dorset & Wilts 2 North (2009–present) ===
Despite widespread restructuring by the RFU at the end of the 2008–09 season, Dorset & Wilts 2 North remained a tier 9 league, with promotion continuing to Dorset & Wilts 1 North and relegation to Dorset & Wilts 3 North.

Dorset & Wilts 2 North
Season	No of teams	Champions	Runners–up	Relegated team(s)	Ref
2009–10	11	Pewsey Vale	Fairford	Minety II	
2010–11	12	Swindon II	Bath Saracens	Multiple teams (Note: Trowbridge III, Colerne, Combe Down II, Bradford-on-Avon II and Marlborough II were the relegated sides this year. The reason lot of teams were relegated were due to the creation of a new Dorset & Wilts 4 division for the following season.)	
2011–12	10	Combe Down	Devizes II	Swindon III, Westbury II, Melksham II	
2012–13	12	Fairford	Chippenham III (Note: Not promoted as Chippenham 2nd team in division above.)	Westbury II, Combe Down II	
2013–14	12	Marlborough	Cricklade	Corsham II, Swindon College Old Boys II	
2014–15	11	Royal Wootton Bassett II	Colerne	Supermarine II, Chippenham III	
2015–16	11	Pewsey Vale	Calne	Bradford-on-Avon II, Swindon College Old Boys II	
2016–17	12	Avonvale	Trowbridge II	Chippenham III, Bath Saracens	
2017–18	12	Sutton Benger	Calne	Combe Down II	
2018–19	12	Frome II	Marlborough II	Royal Wootton Bassett III, Cricklade	
2019–20	12	Westbury	Swindon College II	No relegation (Note: No relegation due to COVID-19 pandemic in the United Kingdom.)	
2020–21	12				
Green backgrounds are promotion places.

== Number of league titles ==
- Bournemouth University (2) (Note: Bournemouth University were formerly known as Dorset Institute of Higher Education (D.I.H.E.). Both titles were won when the league was known as Berks/Dorset/Wilts 2.)
- Frome II (2)
- Marlborough (2)
- Minety (2) (Note: One of Minety's titles was won when the league was known as Berks/Dorset/Wilts 2.)
- Pewsey Vale (2)
- Sutton Benger (2)
- Aldermaston (1) (Note: Aldermaston's title was won when the league was known as Berks/Dorset/Wilts 2.)
- Avonvale (1)
- Blandford (1) (Note: Blandford's title was won when the league was known as Berks/Dorset/Wilts 2.)
- Bradford-on-Avon (1)
- Calne (1)
- Chippenham (1) (Note: Chippenham's title was won when the league was known as Berks/Dorset/Wilts 2.)
- Colerne (1)
- Combe Down (1)
- Cricklade (1)
- Fairford (1)
- Melksham (1) (Note: Melksham's title was won when the league was known as Berks/Dorset/Wilts 2.)
- North Dorset (1) (Note: North Dorset's title was won when the league was known as Berks/Dorset/Wilts 2.)
- Royal Wootton Bassett II (1)
- Supermarine (1) (Note: Supermarine's title was won when the league was known as Berks/Dorset/Wilts 2.)
- Swindon II (1)
- Swindon College Old Boys (1) (Note: Swindon College Old Boys title was won when the league was known as Berks/Dorset/Wilts 2.)
- Tadley (1) (Note: Tadley's title was won when the league was known as Berks/Dorset/Wilts 2.)
- Thatcham (1) (Note: Thatcham's title was won when the league was known as Berks/Dorset/Wilts 2.)
- Trowbridge (1) (Note: Trowbridge's title was won when the league was known as Berks/Dorset/Wilts 2. As a club Trowbridge have won the title twice – once by the first team (Berks/Dorset/Wilts 2) and once by the 2nd XV (Dorset & Wilts 2 North).)
- Trowbridge II (1)
- Westbury (1)

== See also ==
- South West Division RFU
- Dorset & Wilts RFU
- English rugby union system
- Rugby union in England
